= Glee merchandise =

Products based on the Glee television series

The American television series Glee has generated a range of merchandise including soundtracks, DVD and Blu-ray sets, young adult novels and apparel. The show's musical releases have been a commercial success, including several number one, platinum-selling albums. A Glee karaoke game based on the series by Karaoke Revolution was released in November 2009 only on Wii, as well as the fictional autobiography of the character Sue Sylvester.

== Music ==
=== Soundtracks ===
The first Glee soundtrack album, Glee: The Music, Volume 1, was released on November 3, 2009. Glee: The Music, Volume 2 was released on December 4, 2009, and Glee: The Music, Volume 3 Showstoppers was released on May 18, 2010. An extended play (EP) of songs from the Madonna episode, Glee: The Music, The Power of Madonna, was released on April 20, 2010, and an EP of songs from the season one finale episode, Glee: The Music, Journey to Regionals, was released on June 8, 2010. Glee: The Music, The Complete Season One, a compilation album featuring all 100 studio recordings from the first season, was released on September 14, 2010, exclusively to the iTunes Store. For the second season, five soundtrack albums were released: Glee: The Music, The Christmas Album, featuring Christmas-themed songs including several from the tenth episode "A Very Glee Christmas" airing a month later, was released on November 9, 2010; Glee: The Music, Volume 4, featuring music from the Fall 2010 episodes of the season, was released on November 26, 2010; Glee: The Music, Volume 5, featuring music from the six February and March 2011 episodes, was released on March 8, 2011; Glee: The Music Presents the Warblers, featuring music sung by the Dalton Academy Warblers in the second season, was released on April 19, 2011; and Glee: The Music, Volume 6, featuring music from the final six shows of the season, was released on May 23, 2011. One EP was released to accompany the fifth, Halloween-based episode "The Rocky Horror Glee Show"; entitled Glee: The Music, The Rocky Horror Glee Show, it was released on October 19, 2010. On November 15, 2010, a two-disc Europe-exclusive compilation, Glee: The Music, Best of Season One was released featuring nineteen songs and six karaoke tracks from the first season. On December 28, 2010, a Target-exclusive EP entitled Glee: The Music, Love Songs was released through that retail chain, featuring six songs from the show. On September 6, 2011, another Target-exclusive EP entitled Glee: The Music, Dance Party was released through the chain, featuring six more songs from the show.

The series' debut album reached number one in Ireland and the UK and was certified 2× platinum by the Australian Recording Industry Association (ARIA), and platinum by the Recording Industry Association of America (RIAA), the Canadian Recording Industry Association (CRIA) and British Phonographic Industry (BPI). In December 2009, Volume 2 topped the charts in New Zealand, Ireland, and Scotland. It has been certified platinum by the ARIA and CRIA, and gold by the BPI and RIAA. In 2010, the next two releases – Glee: The Music, The Power of Madonna and Glee: The Music, Volume 3 Showstoppers – both debuted at the number one position on the American and Canadian album charts. With the releases reaching number one in the US four weeks apart, the Glee cast beat the record previously set by The Beatles in 1966 for shortest span between first weeks at number one. This record was yet again beaten by Glee: The Music, Journey to Regionals, when it reached number one in the US three weeks later; it also reached number one in Ireland. Glee: The Music, Volume 3 Showstoppers also reached number one in Australia, Ireland, and Scotland, acquiring a platinum certification by the ARIA and gold certifications by the BPI and RIAA; Glee: The Music, Volume 4 acquired the same three certifications. Glee: The Music, The Christmas Album reached number one in Canada, and was given platinum certification by the RIAA and gold certification by the ARIA.

=== Singles ===
The show's musical performances proved to be a commercial success, with over thirteen million copies of Glee cast single releases purchased digitally. The cast performance of "Don't Stop Believin'" reached number two in the United Kingdom, and number four in the US and Ireland. It was certified gold by the RIAA on October 13, 2009, and platinum on March 16, 2011, achieving over 1,000,000 digital sales. The cast had their first number one single with a cover of "Gives You Hell" in Ireland. By June 2010, the cast were second behind The Beatles for most chart appearances by a group act in the Billboard Hot 100's 52-year history, and seventh overall among all artists, with seventy-one appearances. The series' cover versions have also had a positive effect on the original recording artists, such as for Rihanna; sales of "Take a Bow" increased by 189 percent after the song was covered in the Glee episode "Showmance".

=== Sheet music ===
Sheet music for songs performed on Glee are published by the Hal Leonard Corporation, which come available in different choral arrangements from solo to SATB. Emily Crocker, the company's vice president of choral publications, has noted significant demand from show choirs, especially with the score for "Don't Stop Believin'".

== Home media ==
Glee – Pilot Episode: Director's Cut was released on Region 1 DVD in the US on September 1, 2009, exclusively to Wal-Mart. It was released on Region 4 DVD in Australia and New Zealand on November 25, 2009, and on Region 2 DVD in the UK and Ireland on January 25, 2010. The DVD includes a preview of the episode "Showmance", plus a deconstruction of the series by creator Ryan Murphy.

Glee – Volume 1: Road to Sectionals contains the first thirteen episodes of the first season. It was released as a four-disc box set on Region 1 DVD in the US and Canada on December 29, 2009. It was released on Region 4 DVD in Australia and New Zealand on March 31, 2010, and on Region 2 DVD in the UK and Ireland on April 19, 2010, and in South Africa on August 14, 2010. Special features include full length audition pieces from the pilot episode by Michele as Rachel and Riley as Mercedes, plus casting and choreography featurettes. Glee – Volume 2: Road to Regionals contains the final nine episodes of the first season, and was released on Region 2 DVD in the UK and Ireland on September 13, 2010, Region 1 DVD in the US on September 14, 2010, on Region 4 DVD in Australia and New Zealand on September 22, 2010.

Glee – The Complete Season 1 was released on Region 2 DVD on September 13, 2010, Region 1 DVD on September 14, 2010, and Region 4 DVD on September 22, 2010. The seven-disc box set contains the full 22 episode first season, including extended episodes, sing-along karaoke, a behind-the-scenes look at "The Power of Madonna" episode, Glee makeovers, never-before-seen 'Sue's Corner' segments and a dance tutorial. It was also released as a four-disc Blu-ray box set.

Glee - Season 2, Volume 1 was released on Region 1 DVD on January 25, 2011. The 3-disc set contains the first 10 episodes of season 2, including an exclusive "Rocky Horror Glee Show" song ("Planet Schmanet Janet") recorded just for the DVD, a Glee music jukebox, a Getting Waxed with Jane Lynch featurette, Brittany's most "profound" moments from season 1 and the first half of season 2, and a Glee at Comic-Con 2010 featurette. The final twelve episodes of the season are collected on Glee: Season 2, Volume 2, which was released in the US on September 13, 2011, and includes several special features such as "Building Glee's Auditorium" with Cory Monteith and "Shooting Glee in New York City".

Glee – The Complete Season 2 was released on the same day in DVD and Blu-ray, and contains all the special features from the second season's first and second DVD volumes. The two DVDs and full-season Blu-ray were released in the UK on September 19, 2011, and in Australia on October 5, 2011. Amazon.com began taking pre-orders for the complete season box set on Blu-ray and DVD in September 2010, the week the season premiered.

Glee – The Complete Season 3 was released on August 14, 2012, in DVD (with 6-set discs) and Blu-ray (with 4-set discs), and contains the special features; "Glee Music Jukebox", "Glee Under the Stars", "Deleted Scenes", "Santana's Santa Baby Music Video", "Young Sue's Oklahoma! Music Video", "Glee Give a Note", "Welcome to the Class", "Making the Finale", "Sue Addresses Her Fans", "More of Sue's Quips" and "Ginger Supremacists" Extended Scene". This was the first season to not have "Volume" releases.

Glee Encore was released on Region 1 DVD and Blu-ray on April 19, 2011. The DVD features 34 performances from season 1 of the series.

== Book series ==
On June 9, 2010, it was announced by Tina Jordan of Entertainment Weekly that Little, Brown Books had brokered a deal with 20th Century Fox to publish a line of official Glee–related books. Senior executive editor Erin Stein and editor Elizabeth Bewley acquired the rights to publish five Glee novels, which will be developed in collaboration with the show's producers and writers. The first three of these authorized novels have been published under the Poppy imprint of Little, Brown Books, and are written by Sophia Lowell. Glee: The Beginning (0316123595) is a prequel to the events of the television series, and was released August 3, 2010; it includes a double–sided Glee poster, and had an initial print run of 150,000 copies. The second novel in the series, Glee: Foreign Exchange (0316123617), was released on February 15, 2011, and the third, Glee: Summer Break (0316123609), has a publication date of July 5, 2011.

== Other merchandise ==
On June 10, 2010, Twentieth Century Fox Consumer Products unveiled plans for a line of Glee–related merchandise, including games, apparel and stationery. Robert Marick, executive vice president of Fox Consumer Products, stated: "Glee has hit a high note as one of the most attractive entertainment properties in the market today and 'Gleeks' are embracing the show into all aspects of their lives. The merchandise launch will allow fans to continue to engage and express themselves in ways that are core to the essence of the show." The line will include Karaoke Revolution Glee, a Wii game produced by Konami Digital Entertainment, a Glee karaoke machine, boom box and other electronic devices produced by Griffin International, and board games, trivia games and puzzles produced by Cardinal Industries. Hallmark Cards will introduce a line of Glee greeting cards, and various partners will launch bags, holiday gift sets and school stationery. Macy's will carry a line of Glee–related clothing, and Claire's will stock accessories.
