= Santana Lopez =

Fictional character from the Fox series Glee

- Naya Rivera as Santana Lopez on the Glee Live! In Concert! Tour (2010-2011)
- First appearance: "Pilot" (2009)
- Last appearance: "Dreams Come True" (2015)
- Created by: Ryan Murphy; Brad Falchuk; Ian Brennan
- Portrayed by: Naya Rivera

In-universe information
- Occupation: Waitress; Student
- Family: Maribel Lopez (mother); Alma Lopez (grandmother); Hector Lopez (grandfather; deceased); Pedro Lopez (step-grandfather; deceased)
- Spouse: Brittany Pierce
- Significant others: Noah "Puck" Puckerman; Sam Evans; Dani

Santana Lopez is a fictional character from the Fox musical comedy-drama series Glee. The character was portrayed by Naya Rivera, and appeared in Glee from its pilot episode, first broadcast on May 19, 2009. Santana was developed by Glee creators Ryan Murphy, Brad Falchuk, and Ian Brennan. Introduced as a minor antagonist and a sidekick to Quinn Fabray (Dianna Agron) in the first episode of Glee, Santana's role grew over the course of the show's first season. In the second season, Rivera was promoted to a series regular, and Santana was given more high-profile storylines, such as the development of her romantic feelings for her best friend Brittany Pierce (Heather Morris), and the subsequent realization that she is a lesbian. Rivera, who was vocally supportive of the love story between her and Morris' character, received widespread praise for her portrayal of Santana, as well as for her for vocal work in numerous songs performed as part of the show's central glee club, New Directions.

Santana is introduced alongside Quinn and Brittany as one of the three most popular cheerleaders at the fictional William McKinley High School in Lima, Ohio, where the show is set. She joins the school's glee club, and soon is spying on it for Sue Sylvester (Jane Lynch), coach of the cheerleading team the Cheerios. As the season progresses, she becomes more sympathetic to other glee club members, saying she is staying in the club not because Sue is forcing her, but because she likes it.

She has several romantic relationships, briefly dating Noah "Puck" Puckerman (Mark Salling), taking Finn Hudson's (Cory Monteith) virginity, and carrying on a friends with benefits relationship with Brittany. In season two, the show delves into the motivations behind Santana's antagonism and her sexual aggressiveness towards boys; it is later revealed that her cruel attitude is partly driven by her struggle with her romantic feelings towards Brittany, and subsequently with her lesbian identity. This storyline was positively received by critics.

== Storylines ==
=== Season 1 ===
Santana is introduced as a popular cheerleader at William McKinley High School. Santana and her friends, cheerleaders Quinn Fabray and Brittany Pierce, join the school glee club, New Directions, because Quinn wants to keep an eye on her boyfriend Finn Hudson; cheerleading coach Sue Sylvester then enlists the three of them to help her destroy the glee club from the inside. Initially romantically linked to football player Puck, Santana soon breaks up with him over his bad credit score, though the two have an on-again, off-again relationship well into the show's second season. Brittany also reveals in an offhand comment that she and Santana have slept together. When the two are accused of giving Sue the New Directions set list for their first show choir competition, Santana defends herself and admits that she has come to enjoy participating in the club. After Quinn is kicked off the cheerleading squad due to her pregnancy, Santana takes over as head cheerleader. At Sue's behest, Santana and Brittany go on a date with Finn, who is now the glee club co-captain. Santana takes his virginity, though Finn immediately regrets sleeping with her. When Puck briefly dates Mercedes Jones (Amber Riley), Santana is jealous and confronts her with an aggressive duet of "The Boy Is Mine". A similar confrontation, though entirely physical, occurs in the second season after Puck sings a love song to Lauren Zizes (Ashley Fink) in front of the glee club, though Santana loses badly to Lauren.

=== Season 2 ===
Santana is demoted from her position as head cheerleader when Quinn reveals that she had breast implants over the summer, leading to a physical fight between the two. While making out, Brittany suggests to Santana that the two of them should sing Melissa Etheridge's "Come To My Window" for a glee club duet competition. Alarmed, Santana claims that she was only sleeping with Brittany because Puck was temporarily unavailable. Brittany begins to date club member Artie Abrams (Kevin McHale), which piques Santana's jealousy. She briefly quits the glee club with Brittany and Quinn when Sue demands that they choose between being in glee club and being cheerleaders, but Finn convinces them to reverse their decision, and they quit the Cheerios instead. Temporarily without a boyfriend after Puck begins dating Lauren, she breaks up Quinn and her boyfriend Sam Evans (Chord Overstreet), and dates him herself for several weeks. Confronted by Brittany about her feelings for her, Santana confesses that she is in love with her but fears being ostracized by the student body for being in a same-sex relationship, due to what had happened to Kurt (Chris Colfer), who is openly gay, so many times that year. Brittany says she reciprocates her love, but as she also loves Artie, she will not break up with him. In the hope of convincing Brittany to drop Artie and be with her, Santana runs for school prom queen. She blackmails closeted jock and Kurt's bully Dave Karofsky (Max Adler) into becoming her beard and running mate, and to also start an anti-bullying campaign with her to get Kurt to transfer back, as he only left McKinley to go to Dalton Academy for a safe school environment because Karofsky had threatened to kill him. He wins prom king, but Santana is not named queen; instead, it is Kurt. Brittany comforts her, and encourages her to embrace her true identity.

=== Season 3 ===
In season three, Santana and Brittany rejoin the Cheerios, and Sue appoints Santana co-captain along with Becky Jackson (Lauren Potter). Santana is briefly banished from New Directions for disloyalty, and though she is soon allowed to return, she leaves again to join Mercedes in a newly formed all-girl glee club, the Troubletones, and convinces Brittany, who is now her girlfriend, to come with her.

In "Mash Off", Santana pushes the growing rivalry between the clubs to a new level by bullying Finn and Rory. When her supposed apology to Finn becomes another stream of insults, he accuses her of being a coward for tearing other people down because she can't admit that she's in love with Brittany, thus outing her in a crowded public hallway. They are overheard, and Santana's now-revealed lesbianism is used in an "attack" ad against Sue by one of her opponents in the congressional election campaign. Though Santana is warned before the ad runs, she is nevertheless devastated by being publicly outed: she hadn't yet come out to her family. She does so, and while her parents accept her declaration, her grandmother is offended that Santana has made her sexuality public and disowns her, leaving Santana heartbroken. After slapping Finn for outing her, she was almost suspended and made to apologize, while Finn received no repercussions for the outing which caused the slap.

The Troubletones are defeated by New Directions at Sectionals, and Quinn convinces Santana, Brittany and Mercedes to return to the New Directions, having arranged for them to be guaranteed one Troubletones number in all future competitions. When Principal Figgins tells Santana and Brittany in "Heart" to stop kissing publicly at school because he's received complaints, despite not enforcing the same ban on heterosexual couples, Santana is angry, and uses the God Squad's singing-valentine fundraiser to make a point by hiring them to deliver a love song valentine to Brittany.

New Directions competes at Regionals, and with the aid of the Troubletones number featuring Santana, Brittany and Mercedes, the club wins. Later season plots including the leaking of Brittany and Santana's sex tape and Santana's anxiety about her future. In the season finale, after the New Directions win Nationals in Chicago, Santana's mother (Gloria Estefan) writes her a check so she can pursue her dreams in New York if she really wants to.

=== Season 4 ===
In season four, Santana is attending the University of Louisville in Kentucky on a cheerleading scholarship. She and Brittany make attempts at a long-distance relationship, although they break up when they agree it won't work in "The Break Up". Santana comes by McKinley to help out with the school musical in "Glease" and again for Thanksgiving and to help New Directions prepare for the upcoming Sectionals competition in "Thanksgiving". As a mentor, she works with Marley Rose (Melissa Benoist). Santana suspects something is wrong with her, and later finds laxatives in Marley's backpack. She confronts Quinn that she suspects cheerleader, glee clubber, and Quinn's apprentice, Kitty Wilde (Becca Tobin), is trying to deliberately hurt Marley. She is present for the Sectionals performance, and her suspicions appear to be confirmed when Marley collapses on stage due to starvation and anxiety.

She visits Ohio for Christmas in "Glee, Actually" and visits Kurt and Rachel in New York in the episode "Naked".

After a jealous unsuccessful attempt to break up her exes Sam and Brittany in "Diva", Santana realizes she belongs in New York with Rachel and Kurt and moves in with them. In "I Do" she and Quinn sleep together at Will and Emma's wedding, which they agree was a fun one-time experimentation for Quinn. Later, Kurt and Rachel are shown attempting to adjust to Santana, who is making herself at home in the loft a little too quickly for their comfort. In "Girls (and Boys) On Film", Santana later confronts Rachel about a used pregnancy test she found in the garbage, causing Rachel to break down in Santana's arms.

In "Feud", Santana takes Rachel to the doctor, where they discover her pregnancy was a false alarm. However, Santana also learns that Rachel's boyfriend, Brody Weston, is a gigolo. She confronts Brody over this and eventually informs Finn, who tries to scare Brody into leaving town. Later she tells Rachel the truth herself, for which Rachel is ultimately grateful, in "Guilty Pleasures".

=== Season 5 ===
In season five, Santana is employed at a diner in New York. Rachel and Kurt subsequently join her as employees. Santana meets Dani (Demi Lovato), a fellow waitress at the diner who is also a lesbian. They begin a relationship in "Tina in the Sky with Diamonds". Santana also stars in a commercial for Yeast-I-Stat which she is proud of and shares with Rachel. Santana returns to Lima for Finn's funeral and memorial in "The Quarterback". She sings The Band Perry's "If I Die Young" but she breaks down midway through the song. She later confesses to Kurt that she had planned on being nice and telling everyone about the nice things Finn had done for her. Kurt then gives Santana Finn's letterman jacket.

Santana joins Kurt's new band in the episode "A Katy or a Gaga" and suggests that they name the band the Apocalypsticks, which is shot down by Kurt. Brittany states her unhappiness at being a math genius and kisses her ex-girlfriend Santana. In "New Directions", Brittany agrees to dropping out of MIT before going on a trip to Lesbos with Santana. Santana asks Brittany to go with her to New York after their trip, Brittany accepts. Santana returned to New York in "Opening Night" to watch her friend, Rachel's Broadway debut in the revival of Funny Girl.

In "The Back-Up Plan", Santana helps Mercedes to finish her album. In the studio, Santana suggests that they should get out of the studio and explore New York. While leaving the studio, Mercedes and Santana sang Lauryn Hill's Doo Wop (That Thing). However, Mercedes' producer rejected their duet because Santana isn't famous enough. Because of that, Mercedes asked Santana to sign a contract so that she could sing a duet with Mercedes in the latter's album. When Santana found out that Rachel is stuck in Los Angeles because of her audition for a television show, she suggests that she would play Fanny Brice for the night. The next day, Santana said that she would be a better friend.

In "Old Dog New Tricks" she became Rachel's publicist. She sang Eddie Money's "Take Me Home Tonight" with Artie, Blaine, Kurt, Maggie, Mercedes, Rachel, and Sam.

In "The Untitled Rachel Berry Project", Santana was not in New York because she was shooting a Yeast-I-Stat commercial. Brittany and Mercedes will meet her in Reno for Mercedes' mall tour.

=== Season 6 ===
At the beginning of season six, Santana, Brittany and the rest of Glee Club alumni return to McKinley High School in "Homecoming". Along with Quinn and Brittany, she performs "Problem" by Ariana Grande in an attempt to recruit cheerleaders to join the revamped New Directions, currently being revived by Rachel. Their attempt got discouraged by Kitty, the current Cheerios captain and a former glee club member who is bitter with the alumni. Santana succeeds in persuading two twin cheerleaders to audition. She also performs "Take On Me" and "Home" with the alumni around the school.

In "Jagged Little Tapestry", Santana and the alumni stick around for another week to help Rachel recruit for New Directions. After a sweet performance of "Hand In My Pocket" / "I Feel the Earth Move" with Brittany, Santana proposes and Brittany accepts. However, Kurt disagrees with their decision, but Santana insults him by telling him that Blaine broke off his proposal because Kurt is weird.

Santana and Brittany then return in "What the World Needs Now" to deal with Santana's disapproving grandmother Alma – with whom she hasn't spoken since coming out as a lesbian. Brittany takes matters into her own hands and tries to invite Alma to the wedding, but Alma's prejudice is too strong and she rejects their engagement, and Brittany tells her off for doing so. Later the New Directions serenade them in an attempt to be invited to their upcoming wedding. She and Brittany are wed in a double ceremony with Kurt and Blaine, because Brittany wanted it that way, in the eighth episode "A Wedding". Before the ceremony, Sue arrives with Alma, who she has helped to realize that although she may not believe women should marry each other, family is the most important thing, leading her and Santana to reconcile.

Santana and Brittany return briefly in the series finale "Dreams Come True" for a last performance with the rest of the Glee Cast.

== Development ==
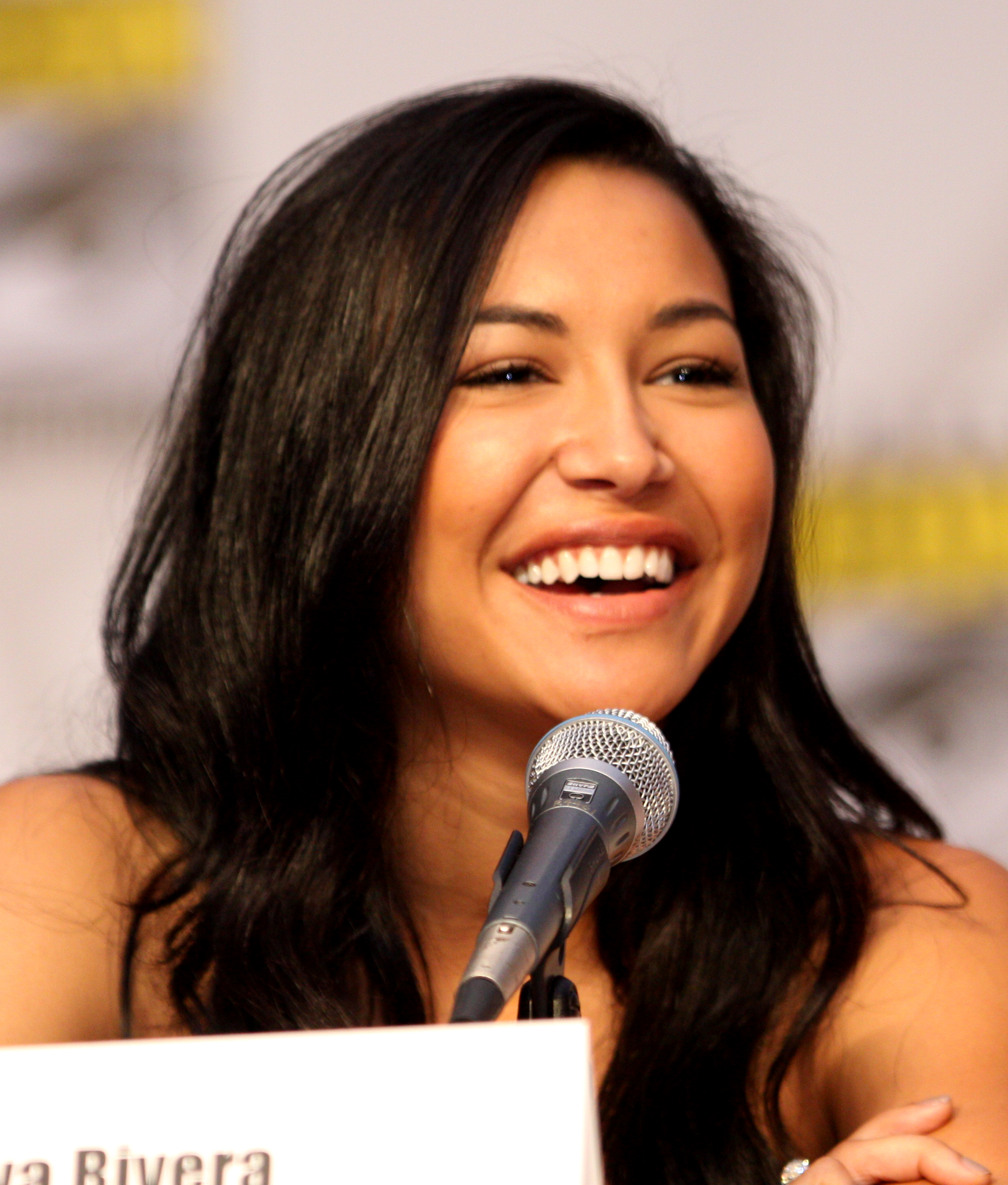
Over the course of the series, Santana (Rivera, pictured) begins to struggle with her sexual identity.

Before her casting on Glee, Naya Rivera had made numerous appearances in small roles on popular primetime television shows. In casting Glee, series creator Ryan Murphy sought actors who could identify with the rush of starring in theatrical roles. Auditioning actors with no theatrical experience were required to prove they could sing and dance as well as act. Rivera drew on her own high school experience of unpopularity to prepare for the role, as well as watching films such as Mean Girls to "really get in the zone and feel like a bitchy Sophomore". She described Santana as "your typical high school cheerleader, for the most part," explaining: "She's really mean and loves boys. She's really witty so I love playing her." She characterized Santana as "a bit of a bad girl" who is "really snarky and always has these really witty one-liners she throws out there." Rivera enjoyed the fact that Santana is competitive and headstrong as she herself shared those traits, but disliked Santana's mean streak. She auditioned for the role as she loves singing, dancing and acting, and had never before had the opportunity to combine all three skills in one project. She found the show's pacing challenging, especially the dancing, and commented in June 2009 that her most memorable moment on Glee was performing the Cheerios' glee club audition piece, "I Say a Little Prayer". Santana played a more prominent part in the last nine episodes of Glee's first season. Rivera commented: "Santana's been wreaking havoc with people's boyfriends and people's babies and teachers—she's the high school terror, and she's going to continue to be the villain." Although Santana continues to step over others to get what she wants, she exhibits moments of compassion and loyalty to the glee club.

Rivera was vocal in her support of the Santana/Brittany relationship, and her attitudes toward Santana's emotional attachment informed her portrayal of the character. In April 2010, when asked if any of "the guys" were Santana's soul mate, Rivera answered, "I think that Brittany is her soul mate. I think that they should end up together. They're in love." A month later, when interviewed by The Advocate, she reiterated this point, saying, "Maybe they'll fall in love. I do think they're soul mates. Brittany just gets Santana, even though a lot of people don't like her." On December 8, 2010, after a surge of fan disappointment over Twitter at the recent absence of Brittana, Rivera tweeted, "There's been a Brittana fan uproar...Don't worry, I miss it too." In January 2011, after several more "Brittana fan uproars", in an article entitled "The future of Brittana: Outlook Not so good", Rivera expressed the reason for such strong fan response: "Honestly, on a deeper level, to the girls that are going through that and it's not so comical in their world, in their everyday lives, they kind of looked up to us, in a sense. That's kind of my reason for hoping they continue the storyline." Ironically, soon after this pessimistic article, Brad Falchuk, co-creator of Glee, tweeted on January 20, "Brittana is on. Brittana was always on."

Santana's arc following "Sexy", where she admits her romantic feelings for Brittany, sees Santana come to terms with her sexual orientation. Falchuk describes Santana, from this point, as having come out internally to herself, but being afraid of coming out to her peers. "Santana is a lesbian. She might not be ready to come out yet, but she is." By the middle of the third season, Santana is both out to her peers, and in a public romantic relationship with Brittany.

== Reception ==
=== Critical response ===
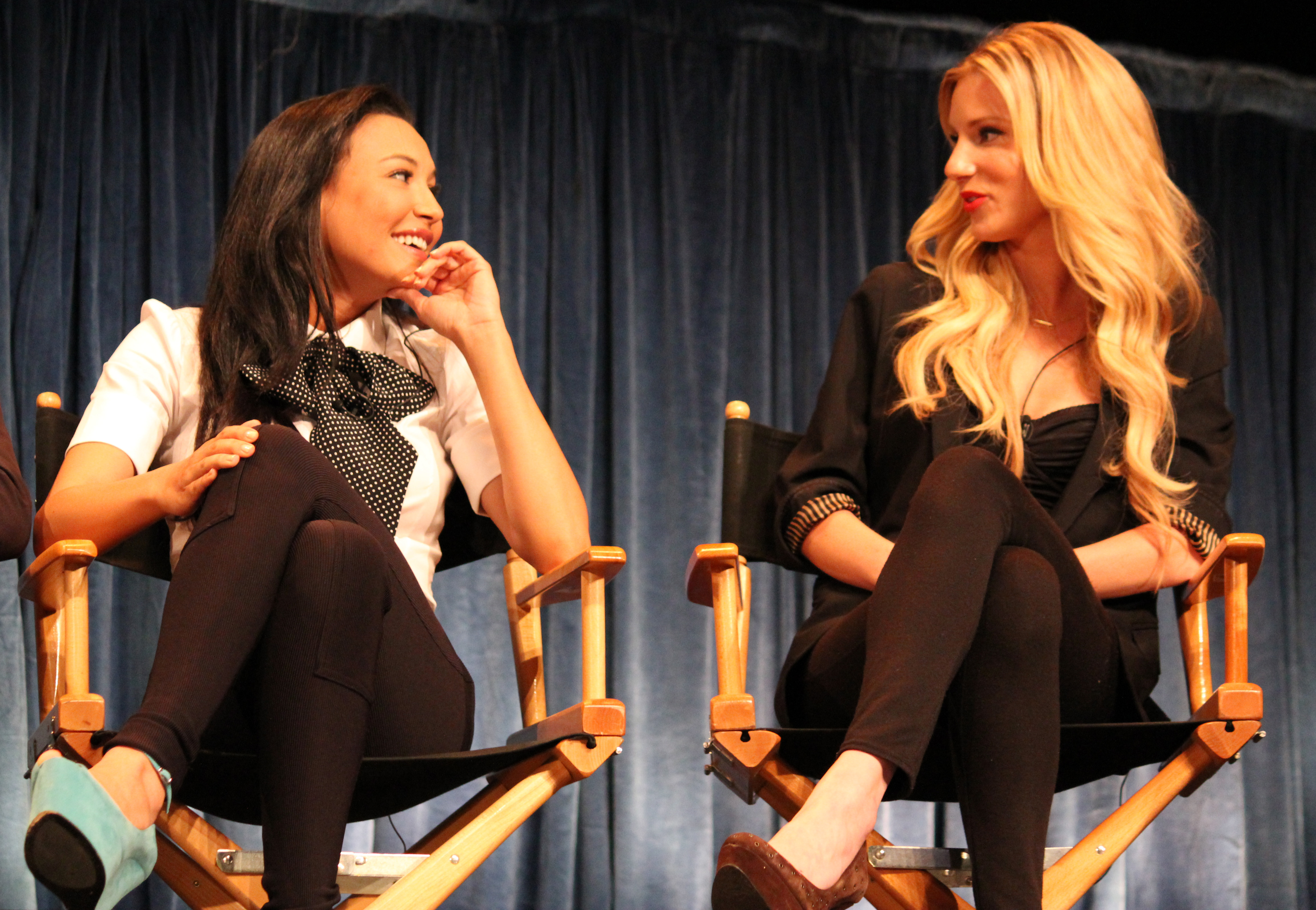
The relationship between Santana (Naya Rivera, left) and Brittany (Heather Morris, right) has been well received by critics and viewers.

When a promotional clip for the episode "Sectionals" indicated that Brittany and Santana had slept together, Dorothy Snarker, writing for lesbian entertainment website AfterEllen.com, praised the pairing, referring to them by the portmanteau "Brittana". Snarker called the two her "new favorite Glee pairing", commenting that: "While Heather Morris (Brittany) and Naya Rivera (Santana) have had minimal screen time, they’ve made it count. [...] Never mind Finn and Rachel—I'm on Team Brittana now." She was ranked first in AfterEllen.com's Top 50 Favorite Female TV Characters. Santana was included in TV Guide's list of the best TV bitches. She was also listed in MTV's Best TV Characters of 2011.

For her role in "Sexy", Santana has received critical acclaim. Sandra Gonzalez of Entertainment Weekly was somewhat surprised by the storyline, observing that Santana had not previously been portrayed as "so serious and vulnerable", but enjoyed the depth it brought to her character. She and Time's James Poniewozik both praised Rivera's acting, with Gonzalez calling her "heartbreakingly perfect". Poniewozik did not find Santana's revelation sudden; he was impressed that the episode found "pathos and heartbreak" in a coupling formerly treated humorously. Emily VanDerWerff of The A.V. Club deemed it the best storyline of the episode, saying it was almost alone the reason the episode received a "B". She called the scene where Santana confessed her feelings for Brittany one of the best moments of the season. Patrick Burns of The Atlantic was pleased that the storyline was "treated with a tender realness," something generally lacking on network television, and Brown, though unconvinced that Santana's conflicted sexuality adequately explained her abrasive personality, praised the series for "exploring some of the more complicated aspects of adolescent sexuality", writing that "Glee does an admirable job of attempting to be all-inclusive."

VanDerWerff praised the character development of Santana, calling it the highlight of the episode "Born This Way". She continued, "The best thing about this episode is Naya Rivera’s work as Santana and the story the three writers have cooked up for her. Rivera's really come into her own this season, going from just a generic bitchy cheerleader to an actual character who has motivations and might be a better villain for the show than Sue. [...] On a show where we’re meant to accept that the characters do whatever the fuck the writers need them to from scene to scene, the storyline of Santana realizing she was in love with Brittany and [...] is probably a lesbian has been nicely plotted and surprisingly deep. The reveal about Santana hasn't washed away her less savory qualities; indeed, it's heightened them, to a degree, as she struggles to be true to herself and still maintain her status as the hottest girl in school."

The episode "Mash Off"'s concluding musical number, "Rumour Has It" / "Someone Like You", was acclaimed as its main highlight. Wall Street Journal writer Raymund Flandez described Rivera's vocals as "electrifying" and "golden". Rolling Stone contributor Erica Futterman wrote that the performance was one of Glee's best sequences: "Mercedes and Santana nail their vocals and the song combines great tracks from one of the year's biggest albums while capturing both the sass and sadness of the Troubletones at this particular moment." Billboard editor Rae Votta called it the best performance since the cast's rendition of "Don't Stop Believin'" in the season one finale, "Journey to Regionals", and stated, "Naya Rivera's powerful vocals and the strong arrangement still packs the emotional punch Glee was targeting." Jen Chaney of The Washington Post awarded the sequence an "A+" grade: "Given the emotional stakes raised by Santana's outing, which happened in the scene right before this performance, and the fact that it marked the series's 300th musical performance, this marriage" of the two Adele songs, "Rumour Has It" and "Someone Like You", was "all the more powerful". Brian Moyler of Gawker asserted that the number was "perfection" and said, "This is why I watch Glee. It is just brilliant from Mercedes first belting to the snaps on the beat to the choreography with the girls walking in a circle and making little whispers to Santana bringing tears to my eyes singing 'Someone Like You' as if it was the last song she'll ever sing in her damn life." Cinema Blend's Melissa Duko stated that the show "hit it out of the park" and added that it was her favorite performance of the season. TVLine correspondent Michael Slezak gave the number an "A+" and wrote, "Nobody can completely match Adele doing Adele, and yet Naya Rivera and Amber Riley somehow made the sum of this mashup a worthy equal to Adele's glorious original parts."

=== Accolades ===
At the 2010 AfterEllen.com Visibility Awards, Brittany and Santana were nominated for the Favorite Fictional Lesbian Couple award, and Rivera was nominated in the Favorite TV Actress category. Also that year, Rivera was nominated in the Best Supporting Actress/Television category at the Imagen Awards, and she and her co-stars won the Screen Actors Guild Award for Outstanding Performance by an Ensemble in a Comedy Series. They were nominated in the same category the following year. At the 2011 ALMA Awards, Rivera was nominated in the Favorite TV Actress – Leading Role in a Comedy category.

=== Impact ===
The character of Santana had a positive impact on U.S. television, providing rare queer Latina and Afro-Latinx representation on prime time television and laying the foundation for similar characters and stories to follow. Summarizing her multi-faceted representation, Refinery29's Ariana Romero explained that "Santana isn't merely an unapologetic Latina – itself a painful rarity on-screen, particularly [during Glee's run] – but she is unapologetically Afro-Latina". Alicia Ramírez for O, The Oprah Magazine wrote that Santana was "one of the most visible Latinx lesbians on primetime TV". The impact of the character spread through pop culture, with Jorge Rodriguez-Jimenez of Mitú writing that "You didn't have to be an avid viewer of the show to understand and appreciate the magnitude of Santana Lopez".

In the 2013 book Latinos and Narrative Media: Participation and Portrayal, edited by Frederick Luis Aldama, Rivera and Santana are discussed. In one chapter, by Isabel Molina-Guzmán, she is highlighted as the main example of a character that is non-stereotypical but still embodies Latinidad; is listed with Jessica Alba's turn in Dark Angel as a significant character who has main storylines not focused on race; and is noted as racially ambiguous enough, not firmly defined as white or Black, to open the door for new Latina narratives. Molina-Guzmán added that Rivera played "the first lesbian Latina on primetime television [and thus was] honored for her compassionate and complex representation". In Tracy L. Hawkins' chapter in the 2014 book Queer in the Choir Room: Essays on Gender and Sexuality in Glee, she explains that until Glee, and particularly the complexity of Santana's seasons-long coming out journey, all stories of television characters revealing their sexuality followed certain norms that play into stereotypes and did not focus on the character themselves.

Romero noted that while Santana starts the show as little more than "the feisty Latina trope", Rivera's performance gave her more nuance and the character ultimately confronted others for perpetuating harmful Latino stereotypes in the episode "The Spanish Teacher"; this episode notably included a duet between Rivera and the queer Latino Ricky Martin, something Romero describes as one of the show's more subtle nods to queer representation and "one of Santana's best moments of Latinx pride". Ramírez also highlighted Santana's confidence in performing in musical theatre as positive representation, showing her "unapologetically taking up room in [a] predominantly white space". Elements of her queer representation were discussed. Digital Spy's Emily Browne wrote of the significance of showing Santana's emotional response to her sexuality but not being defined by it, with the character being "a popular, confident, smart femme". Study Breaks added that "Santana is a deeply flawed character", which creates a healthier representation of queer characters than most, who are "too often [...] nearly perfect individuals", and Ms. noted that though there was much more queer representation by 2020, Rivera's push for Santana's relationship to be handled well makes the character still stand out as "one of the few lesbian characters to ultimately have a happy ending". A BBC retrospective in 2020 looked at the impact of Rivera's role as Santana in providing important representation, internationally, for young queer women and the idea of being out in the music industry.

Following Rivera's death in July 2020, numerous outlets and individuals cited her portrayal of Santana as a positive representation of both Latinas and the LGBT community in the media. U.S. Representative Alexandria Ocasio-Cortez tweeted a tribute, saying that "As a Latina, it's rare to have rich, complex characters reflect us in media. Naya worked hard to give that gift to so many", and then-California senator Kamala Harris wrote in a tweet that Rivera inspired "countless young LGBTQ+ people to unapologetically be themselves". Singer Demi Lovato, who played the girlfriend of Rivera's character on Glee in its fifth season, expressed similar sentiments, writing: "The character you played was groundbreaking for tons of closeted (at the time) queer girls like me and your ambition and accomplishments were inspiring to Latina women all over the world". The Gay Emmys replaced its Best Coming Out Story award with the Santana Lopez Legacy Award For Outstanding Queer Teen Character, beginning with the 2020 event, in honor of Rivera and her character's legacy.

== Discography ==
Charting singles released by Glee cast with Naya Rivera as a featured singer
Title	Year	Peak positions											Album
Title	Year	US Hot 100	UK	IRE	CAN Hot 100	AUS	FR	NZ	SCOT	US Airplay 100	US Holiday	World Top 40	Album
"Express Yourself"	2010	(Note: "Express Yourself" did not enter the Billboard Hot 100, but did peak at number 16 on the Bubbling Under Hot 100 extension chart.)	132	—	—	—	—	—	—	—	—	—	Glee: The Music, The Power of Madonna
"Like A Virgin" (featuring Jonathan Groff)	2010	87	58	47	83	—	—	—	43	—	—	—	Glee: The Music, The Power of Madonna
"The Boy Is Mine"	2010	76	62	46	60	97	—	—	—	—	—	—	Glee: The Music, The Complete Season One
"Bad Romance"	2010	54	41	10	46	51	—	—	40	—	—	—	Glee: The Music, Volume 3 Showstoppers
"To Sir with Love"	2010	76	60	—	62	61	—	—	—	—	—	—	Glee: The Music, Journey to Regionals
"Empire State of Mind"	2010	21	35	20	25	20	—	—	28	—	—	—	Glee: The Music, Volume 4
"Me Against the Music"	2010	56	110	—	54	93	—	—	86	—	—	—	Glee: The Music, Volume 4
"Toxic"	2010	16	40	17	15	37	—	—	33	—	—	—	Glee: The Music, Volume 4
"River Deep, Mountain High"	2010	41	45	30	36	44	—	—	38	—	—	—	Glee: The Music, Volume 4
"Touch a Touch a Touch a Touch Me"	2010	—	72	—	96	—	—	—	59	—	—	—	Glee: The Music, The Rocky Horror Glee Show
"Time Warp"	2010	89	63	42	52	70	—	—	46	—	—	—	Glee: The Music, The Rocky Horror Glee Show
"Start Me Up / Livin' on a Prayer"	2010	31	39	30	22	49	—	—	29	—	—	—	Glee: The Music, The Complete Season Two
"Forget You" (featuring Gwyneth Paltrow)	2010	11	31	20	12	24	—	—	28	—	—	19	Glee: The Music, Volume 4
"Valerie"	2010	54	112	—	70	—	—	—	90	—	—	—	Glee: The Music, Volume 4
"Deck the Rooftop"	2010	—	—	—	86	—	—	—	—	—	11	—	Glee: The Music, The Christmas Album
"God Rest Ye Merry Gentlemen"	2010	—	—	—	—	—	—	—	—	—	18	—	Glee: The Music, The Christmas Album
"Thriller / Heads Will Roll"	2011	38	23	37	30	17	—	38	19	—	—	—	Glee: The Music, Volume 5
"Blame It On the Alcohol"	2011	55	63	—	61	—	—	—	58	—	—	—	Glee: The Music, Dance Party
"Landslide" (featuring Gwyneth Paltrow)	2011	23	52	36	35	38	—	—	46	—	—	40	Glee: The Music, Volume 5
"Loser like Me"	2011	6	27	23	9	15	—	28	68	75	—	19	Glee: The Music, Volume 5
"Songbird"	2011	68	54	—	70	—	—	—	52	—	—	—	Glee: The Music, Volume 6
"Dancing Queen"	2011	74	169	—	89	—	—	—	—	—	—	—	Glee: The Music, Volume 6
"Back to Black"	2011	82	103	—	—	—	—	—	98	—	—	—	Glee: The Music, The Complete Season Two
"I Love New York / New York, New York"	2011	81	83	—	81	—	—	—	77	—	—	—	Glee: The Music, The Complete Season Two
"Light Up the World"	2011	33	48	46	26	78	188	—	44	—	—	—	Glee: The Music, Volume 6
"We Got the Beat"	2011	83	129	—	83	—	—	—	—	—	—	—	Glee: The Music, The Complete Season Three
"It's All Over"	2011	(Note: "It's All Over" did not enter the Billboard Hot 100, but did peak at number 21 on the Bubbling Under Hot 100 extension chart.)	—	—	—	—	—	—	—	—	—	—	Glee: The Music, The Complete Season Three
"Run the World (Girls)"	2011	91	130	—	—	91	—	—	—	—	—	—	Glee: The Music, Volume 7
"Candyman"	2011	(Note: "Candyman" did not enter the Billboard Hot 100, but did peak at number 18 on the Bubbling Under Hot 100 extension chart.)	158	—	—	—	—	—	—	—	—	—	Glee: The Music, The Complete Season Three
"A Boy Like That"	2011	(Note: "A Boy Like That" did not enter the Billboard Hot 100, but did peak at number 20 on the Bubbling Under Hot 100 extension chart.)	—	—	—	—	—	—	—	—	—	—	Glee: The Music, The Complete Season Three
"America"	2011	(Note: "America" did not enter the Billboard Hot 100, but did peak at number 1 on the Bubbling Under Hot 100 extension chart.)	191	—	—	—	—	—	—	—	—	—	Glee: The Music, The Complete Season Three
"Hit Me with Your Best Shot / One Way or Another"	2011	86	134	—	95	90	—	—	—	—	—	—	Glee: The Music, The Complete Season Three
"Rumour Has It / Someone Like You"	2011	11	35	19	12	28	—	—	37	—	—	16	Glee: The Music, Volume 7
"I Kissed a Girl"	2011	66	149	—	87	—	—	—	—	—	—	—	Glee: The Music, The Complete Season Three
"Constant Craving" (featuring Idina Menzel)	2011	89	—	—	—	—	—	—	—	—	—	—	Glee: The Music, Volume 7
"Survivor / I Will Survive"	2011	51	97	—	47	—	—	—	90	—	—	—	Glee: The Music, The Complete Season Three
"We Are Young"	2011	12	56	32	11	49	—	—	53	—	—	21	Glee: The Music, The Graduation Album
"Do They Know It's Christmas?"	2011	92	—	—	85	—	—	—	—	—	3	—	Glee: The Music, The Christmas Album Volume 2
"Santa Baby"	2011	—	—	—	—	—	—	—	—	—	11	—	Glee: The Music, The Christmas Album Volume 2
"The First Time Ever I Saw Your Face"	2012	70	—	—	78	—	—	—	—	—	—	—	Glee: The Music, The Complete Season Three
"Summer Nights"	2012	88	—	—	85	—	—	—	—	—	—	—	Glee: The Music, The Complete Season Three
"We Found Love"	2012	56	151	—	55	—	—	—	—	—	—	—	Glee: The Music, The Complete Season Three
"Bad"	2012	80	193	—	90	—	—	—	—	—	—	—	Glee: The Music, The Complete Season Three
"Smooth Criminal" (featuring 2Cellos)	2012	26	86	46	28	—	—	—	76	—	—	34	Glee: The Music, The Complete Season Three
"Black or White"	2012	64	182	—	69	—	—	—	—	—	—	—	Glee: The Music, The Complete Season Three
"La Isla Bonita" (featuring Ricky Martin)	2012	99	152	—	93	—	—	—	—	—	—	—	Glee: The Music, The Complete Season Three
"What Doesn't Kill You (Stronger)"	2012	66	—	—	51	—	—	—	—	—	—	—	Glee: The Music, The Complete Season Three
"Fly / I Believe I Can Fly"	2012	56	—	—	59	—	—	—	—	—	—	—	Glee: The Music, The Complete Season Three
"How Will I Know"	2012	65	73	—	61	92	—	—	79	—	—	—	Glee: The Music, The Complete Season Three
"I Wanna Dance with Somebody (Who Loves Me)"	2012	(Note: "I Wanna Dance with Somebody (Who Loves Me)" did not enter the Billboard Hot 100, but did peak at number 1 on the Bubbling Under Hot 100 extension chart.)	113	—	80	—	—	—	—	—	—	—	Glee: The Music, The Complete Season Three
"So Emotional"	2012	(Note: "So Emotional" did not enter the Billboard Hot 100, but did peak at number 25 on the Bubbling Under Hot 100 extension chart.)	166	—	—	—	—	—	—	—	—	—	Glee: The Music, The Complete Season Three
"Cell Block Tango"	2012	—	175	—	—	—	—	—	—	—	—	—	Glee: The Music, The Complete Season Three
"Shake It Out"	2012	71	54	29	60	—	—	—	49	—	—	—	Glee: The Music, The Complete Season Three
"Love You Like a Love Song"	2012	—	180	—	—	—	—	—	—	—	—	—	Glee: The Music, The Complete Season Three
"Edge of Glory"	2012	—	141	—	—	—	—	—	—	—	—	—	Glee: The Music, The Graduation Album
"Paradise by the Dashboard Light"	2012	(Note: "Paradise by the Dashboard Light" did not enter the Billboard Hot 100, but did peak at number 15 on the Bubbling Under Hot 100 extension chart.)	95	—	94	—	—	—	—	—	—	—	Glee: The Music, The Complete Season Three
"We Are The Champions"	2012	—	198	—	—	—	—	—	—	—	—	—	Glee: The Music, The Graduation Album
"Mine"	2012	(Note: "Mine" did not enter the Billboard Hot 100, but did peak at number 15 on the Bubbling Under Hot 100 extension chart.)	95	—	(Note: "Mine" did not enter the Canadian Hot 100, but did peak at number 75 on the Canadian Digital Song Sales extension chart.)	—	79	—	—	—	—	—	Glee: The Music, Season 4, Volume 1
"The Scientist"	2012	91	—	—	72	—	—	—	—	—	—	—	Glee: The Music, Season 4, Volume 1
"If I Die Young"	2013	—	82	56	—	—	—	—	73	—	—	—	Glee: The Quarterback
"—" denotes a recording that did not chart or was not released in that territory.
