= Journey to Regionals =

- Glee episode
- Episode no.: Season 1 Episode 22
- Directed by: Brad Falchuk
- Written by: Brad Falchuk
- Production code: 1ARC21
- Original air date: June 8, 2010

Guest appearances
- Josh Groban as himself; Jonathan Groff as Jesse St. James; Idina Menzel as Shelby Corcoran; Iqbal Theba as Principal Figgins; Charlotte Ross as Judy Fabray; Naya Rivera as Santana Lopez; Bill A. Jones as Rod Remington; Heather Morris as Brittany Pierce; Harry Shum, Jr. as Mike Chang; Dijon Talton as Matt Rutherford; Olivia Newton-John as herself

Episode chronology
← Previous "Funk"	Next → "Audition"
- Glee season 1

"Journey to Regionals" is the twenty-second episode and first season finale of the American television series Glee. The episode was written and directed by series creator Brad Falchuk, and premiered on the Fox network on June 8, 2010. In "Journey to Regionals", New Directions performs at Regionals in front of celebrity judges Josh Groban, Olivia Newton-John, Rod Remington (Bill A. Jones) and Sue Sylvester (Jane Lynch). Club member Quinn (Dianna Agron) gives birth to her daughter, Beth, whom rival glee club coach Shelby Corcoran (Idina Menzel) adopts. Co-captains Finn (Cory Monteith) and Rachel (Lea Michele) reunite, and director Will Schuester (Matthew Morrison) professes his love for guidance counselor Emma Pillsbury (Jayma Mays). Although New Directions comes in last in the competition, Sue persuades Principal Figgins (Iqbal Theba) not to disband the club for another year.

The episode features cover versions of nine songs, seven of which are included on the EP Glee: The Music, Journey to Regionals, released on June 8, 2010. The album charted at number one in America, setting the record for the shortest span between first weeks at the top of the Billboard 200 with different releases, charting only three weeks after the soundtrack album Glee: The Music, Volume 3 Showstoppers also reached number one. While "Journey to Regionals" is the first episode of Glee to have none of its musical performances released as singles, all six EP tracks charted on the Billboard Hot 100 and the Canadian Hot 100.

"Journey to Regionals" was watched by 10.92 million American viewers and attained the highest finale rating for a new show in the 2009–2010 television season. The episode was the most-watched scripted show of the week of broadcast in the 18-49 demographic, and received generally positive reviews from critics. Emily VanDerWerff of The A.V. Club deemed it among the best of the entire season, and Time's James Ponieowzik felt that the episode was a return to Glee's roots, justifying its renewal for a second season. In contrast, Brett Berk of Vanity Fair felt that "Journey to Regionals" was a mediocre episode, while Jean Bentley of MTV found it uneven, representative of the season as a whole.

== Plot ==
The episode begins with a flashback of the night Quinn Fabray lost her virginity to Noah Puckerman when they had sex in her bed, unbeknownst to her then boyfriend, Finn Hudson.

When cheerleading coach Sue Sylvester (Jane Lynch) announces that she will be one of the judges at Regionals, along with Josh Groban, Olivia Newton-John, and local news anchor Rod Remington (Bill A. Jones), the glee club members worry that New Directions will soon be disbanded. Principal Figgins (Iqbal Theba) stands by his requirement that glee club must place at Regionals to continue, despite director Will Schuester's (Matthew Morrison) protestation that Sue is attempting to sabotage them. Will turns to guidance counselor Emma Pillsbury (Jayma Mays), who reveals that she has begun dating her dentist, Carl Howell.

Rachel (Lea Michele) kisses Finn (Cory Monteith) when he encourages her to be more optimistic. At Regionals, Aural Intensity is first to perform, singing a mash-up of "Magic" by Olivia Newton-John and "You Raise Me Up" by Josh Groban. Will gives New Directions a pep talk, and Finn professes his love for Rachel just before going on stage. The club pays tribute to Journey, performing "Faithfully", a mash-up of "Any Way You Want It" and "Lovin', Touchin', Squeezin'", and "Don't Stop Believin'".

Quinn's (Dianna Agron) mother, Judy Fabray (Charlotte Ross), comes to watch Quinn perform. She tells Quinn that she kicked her father out of the house after she found out he was having an affair and invites Quinn to come back home. Quinn informs her that her water has broken, and is rushed to the hospital, where she gives birth to a girl. While the other New Directions members accompany Quinn to the hospital, Rachel stays at Regionals to watch Vocal Adrenaline's performance of "Bohemian Rhapsody". She asks their coach, her biological mother Shelby Corcoran (Idina Menzel), to help coach New Directions, but Shelby tells Rachel that she's tired of coaching glee clubs, and is stepping down as Vocal Adrenaline's coach to settle down and start a family. Shelby adopts Quinn's baby, whom she names Beth at Puck's (Mark Salling) request.

During the pre-vote discussion, the other celebrity judges insult Sue for her lack of fame. Aural Intensity is named runner-up, and Vocal Adrenaline wins, with New Directions coming in last. Emma argues with Figgins about the club's future, but he remains intent on disbanding it, since it failed to place. Will has accepted their loss, and professes his love for Emma and kisses her. Sue overhears New Directions' performance of "To Sir With Love" in appreciation of all that Will has done to help them grow. It is revealed that Sue voted for New Directions to win, and has agreed to end her blackmail of Principal Figgins in exchange for giving New Directions at least one more year to prove themselves and win Regionals. She explains to Will that she may not like him, but she respects his work with the students. Will tells the club of its extension, and performs Israel Kamakawiwoʻole's version of "Over the Rainbow" with Puck in celebration.

== Production ==
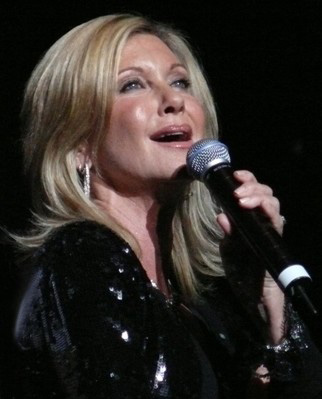
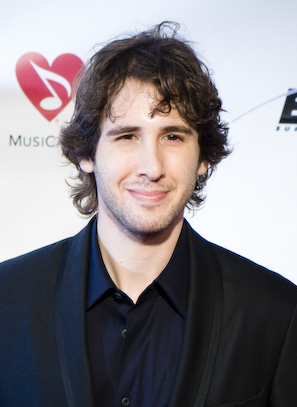
Olivia Newton-John (left) and Josh Groban (right) guest starred as celebrity judges

"Journey to Regionals" was filmed in April 2010, with fans of Glee invited through Facebook and Twitter to attend the filming of Regionals at the Saban Theatre in Beverly Hills, California. In the episode, both Josh Groban and Olivia Newton-John reprise their roles from earlier in the season, appearing as themselves to judge the Ohio Regionals round of show choir competition alongside Sue and Rod Remington. Series creator Ryan Murphy explained: "The theme of Regionals is celebrity judges. Sue is now a nationwide celebrity. And Olivia and Josh only like choirs that sing their songs, so that's funny. They wanted to do something that played against what people think about them... to play against type. So we gave them an opportunity. And it's funny to have Sue as a judge when she doesn’t really know about [music], and she has it out for that darn Glee club."

Other recurring characters who appear in the episode are glee club members Santana Lopez (Naya Rivera), Brittany (Heather Morris), Mike Chang (Harry Shum, Jr.) and Matt Rutherford (Dijon Talton), Principal Figgins, Vocal Adrenaline lead singer Jesse St. James (Jonathan Groff), Vocal Adrenaline coach and Rachel's birth mother Shelby Corcoran, and Quinn's mother Judy Fabray. Emma's new love interest does not appear in the episode, but will become a major character from early in the show's second season, played by John Stamos. Will and Emma's kiss in "Journey to Regionals" was unscripted. Falchuk chose not to inform Mays that it was planned to ensure authenticity in her reaction.

Glee: The Music, Journey to Regionals, an EP containing songs from the episode, was released on June 8, 2010. It features cover versions of Journey's "Faithfully" and "Don't Stop Believin'", as well as a mash-up of "Any Way You Want It" and "Lovin' Touchin' Squeezin'". "Bohemian Rhapsody" by Queen is also on the EP, as is "To Sir With Love" by Lulu and Judy Garland's "Over the Rainbow" as reinvented by Israel Kamakawiwoʻole. The EP debuted at number one on the US Billboard 200 selling 158,000 copies, and at number two on the Canadian Albums Chart, selling 14,000 copies. It entered the Irish Albums Chart at number 14, climbing to number 1 in its second week of release, becoming the fourth Glee cast release to top the Irish charts. In America, Journey to Regionals was the cast's third number one album, charting only three weeks after Glee: The Music, Volume 3 Showstoppers, and beating its own record for shortest span between first weeks at the top position with different releases, previously held with Glee: The Music, The Power of Madonna and Volume 3 Showstoppers.

"Journey to Regionals" is the first episode of Glee to have none of its musical performances released as singles. Despite this, all six EP tracks charted on the Billboard Hot 100 and the Canadian Hot 100, the highest-charting being "Faithfully" at number 36 in the US, and "Over the Rainbow" at number 31 in Canada. A mash-up of Newton-John's "Magic" and Groban's "You Raise Me Up" is also used in the episode, but does not feature on the EP. Glee's costume designer Lou Eyrich took inspiration from 1960s girl groups for the outfits worn by the show choirs, selecting black and fuchsia sequined dresses for Vocal Adrenaline, and Betsey Johnson's "Goldie" brocade halter dress for New Directions.

== Reception ==
In its original broadcast, "Journey to Regionals" was watched by 10.92 million American viewers, and tied with the 2010 NBA Finals to lead in the 18–49 demographic in its timeslot, attaining a 4.6 Nielsen rating. The series' 18–49 viewership was up 18 percent on the previous episode, giving Glee the highest finale rating for a new show in the 2009–2010 television season. "Journey to Regionals" was the fourth most-watched show of the week in the 18-49 demographic, the highest scripted show, and the sixth most-watched program amongst all viewers. In the UK, the episode was broadcast on Monday 14 June 2010, and was watched by 2.354 million viewers (1.952 million on E4, and 402,000 on E4+1), becoming the most-watched show on E4 and E4 +1 for the week, and the most-watched show on cable for the week.

The episode received generally positive reviews from critics. Darren Franich of Entertainment Weekly called it "just about perfect", writing: "this was one of those high-energy episodes that narrowed its song focus [...] and found a just-right mix of cynicism and optimism, of banal reality and glam performance." Raymund Flandez of The Wall Street Journal commented: "It's been a long premiere season of ups and downs, and this last show is a warm embrace that — let’s face it — you just don't want to let go." The Houston Chronicle's Bobby Hankinson deemed the episode "awesome", observing: "While it was light on the usual humor, it was heavy on emotion, and I think that's ideal for a season finale. Glee ended its freshman season with a real wallop that took a couple of unexpected turns before pulling nicely into a satisfying finish." Emily VanDerWerff of The A.V. Club graded the episode "A−", deeming it among the best of the entire season. She felt that: "On its own, 'Journey to Regionals' is a fantastic episode of Glee. As a capper to the season, it mostly works." While VanDerWerff had some issues with the episode, including Shelby's sudden decision to adopt Beth, she summarized that: "for once in this back nine, the good stuff absolutely overwhelms the stupid stuff." Jessica Derschowitz of CBS News felt that: "Glee wrapped up on a high note, leaving some of the season's less-appealing plotlines behind and heading towards the promise of more performances and more amazing Sue Sylvester one-liners next season."

Time's James Poniewozik wrote that with "Journey to Regionals", Glee "returned to its roots, balancing its weirdness, snark and bombast with intimate stories of small-town high school life. And it, too, by showing what it can be at its best, made its case for staying around another year." IGN's Eric Goldman rated "Journey to Regionals" 8.5/10, signifying a "great" episode. He felt that while it did not match the standards of the mid–season finale episode "Sectionals", it was "still a very satisfying wrap up to the first year of Glee." Gerrick D. Kennedy of the Los Angeles Times noted that he "went into the finale peeved at how incredibly messy last week's episode was", but overall he deemed the finale a success. Vanity Fair's Brett Berk found "Journey to Regionals" a fulfilling, albeit "pretty mediocre" episode, describing it as having "a sense of narrative cohesion that went beyond the writers’ usual throwing-flatware-down-the-garburator modality". Jean Bentley of MTV found the episode representative of the first season as a whole, explaining: "Much like the entire first year of the show, the uneven episode started out with a promising, action-packed plot, impressed with a couple of flashy musical numbers, then got too cheesy for its own good and petered out with an overly sentimental song." Fellow MTV writer Aly Semigran noted: "I was hoping for a little more excitement from the episode, though it all did feel very full circle for so many of our characters we've come to know and love. Here's to hoping Glee can get back its stellar momentum in season two."
