= List of Billboard 200 number-one albums of 2010 =

These are the U.S. number-one albums of 2010 on the Billboard 200, as per Billboard.

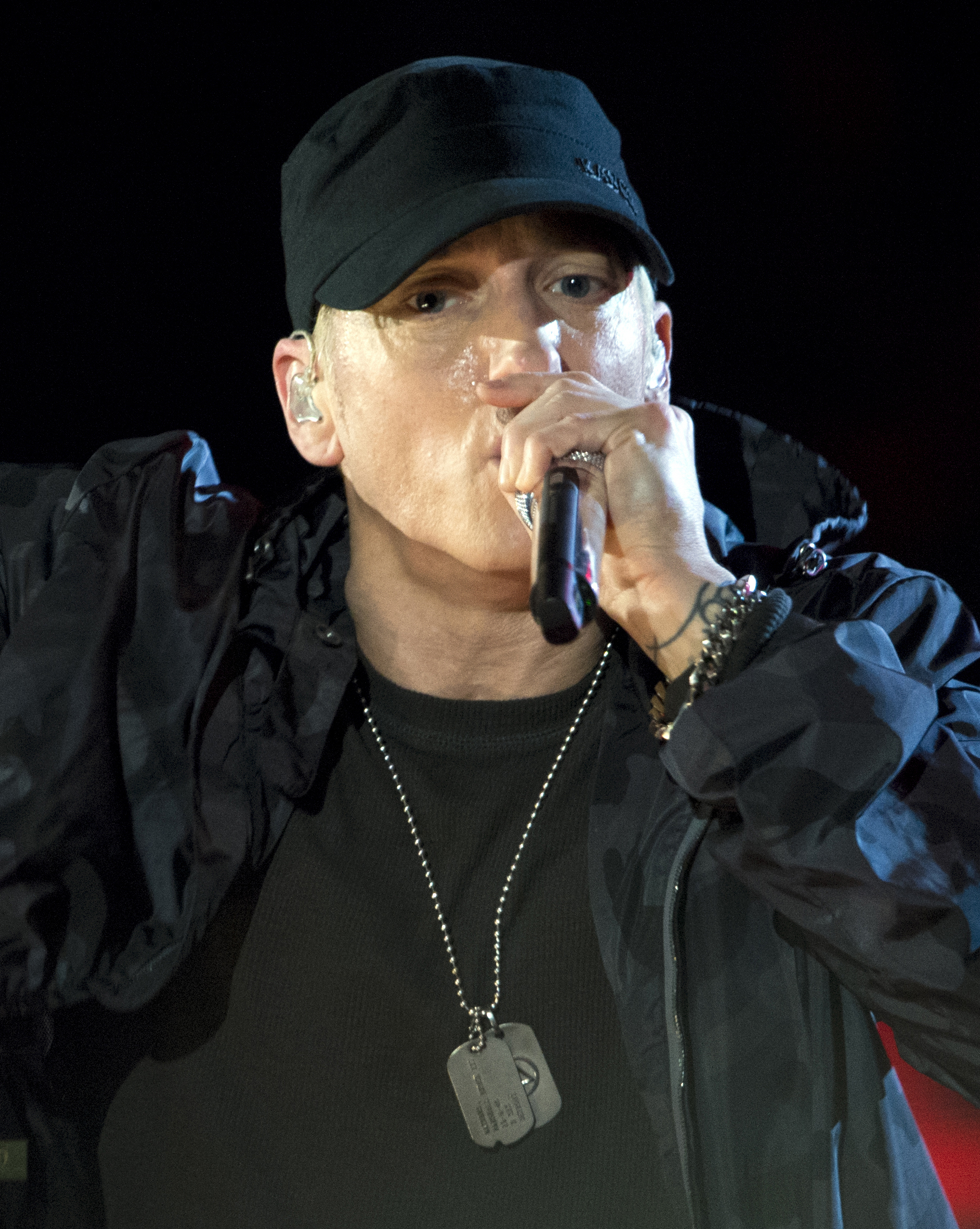
Recovery by rapper Eminem was the best selling album of 2010.

Note that Billboard publishes charts with an issue date approximately 7–10 days in advance.

The seventh studio album by American rapper Eminem, Recovery, was the best selling album of 2010 and spent the most time at number one in the year, a total seven weeks. Scottish singer Susan Boyle also spent 7 weeks topping the chart, but with two albums, 2009's I Dreamed A Dream and 2010's The Gift. American country singer-songwriter Taylor Swift's third studio album, Speak Now, opened with more than 1.08 million copies sold in its first week, becoming the first country album to do so.

== Chart history ==
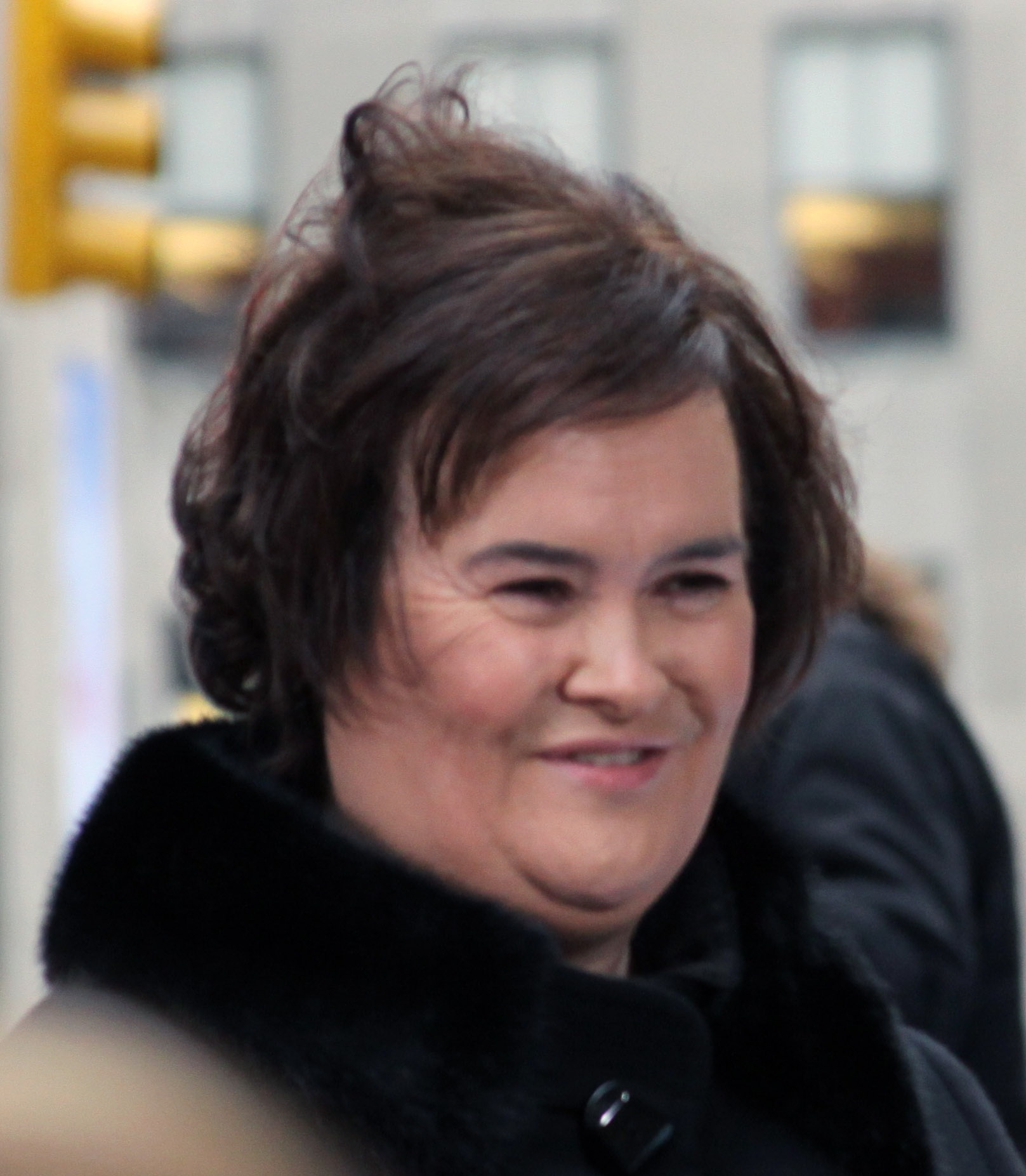
I Dreamed a Dream (2009) by Susan Boyle was the best performing album of the year, while its follow-up, The Gift, spent four weeks atop the chart in 2010.

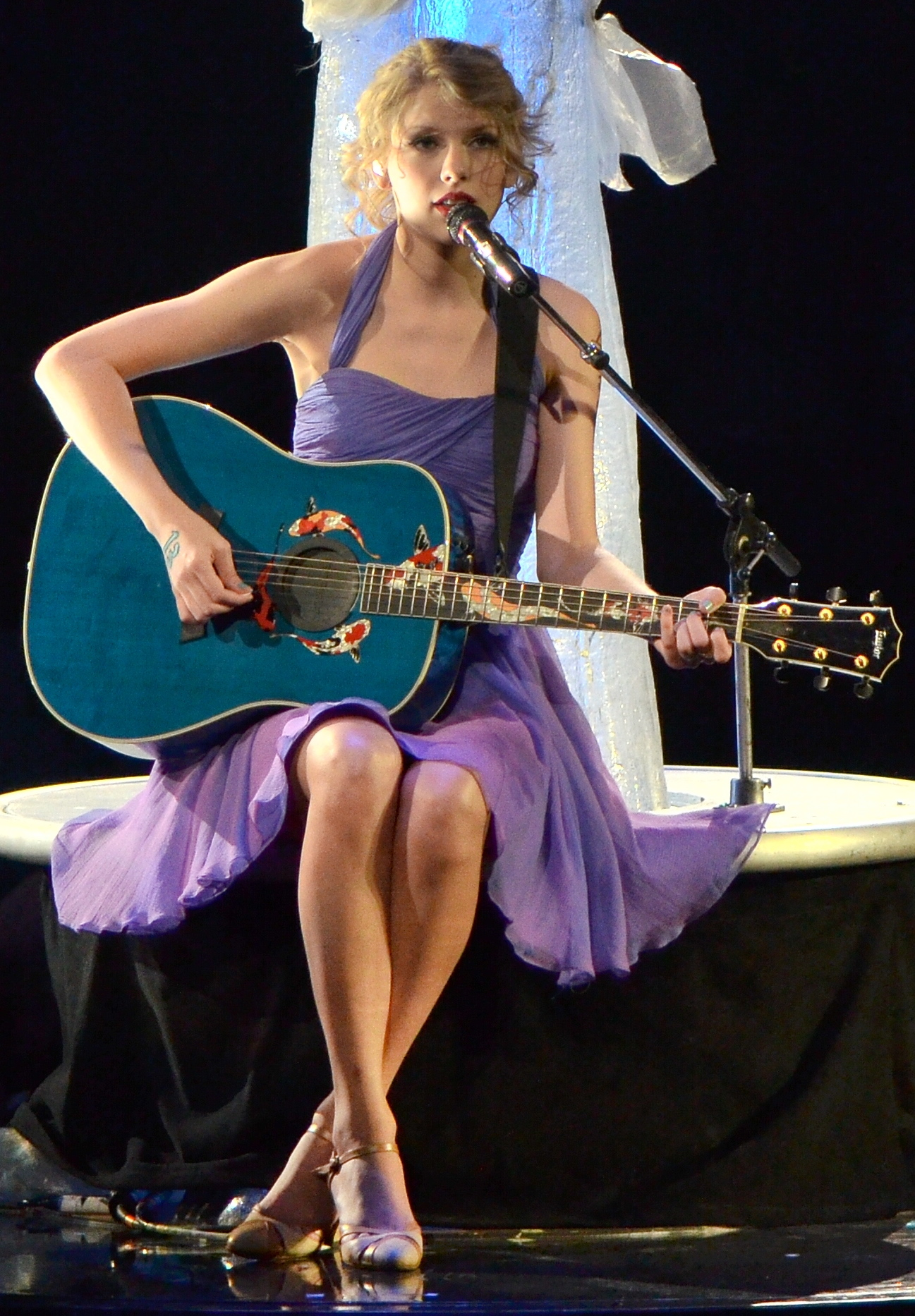
Speak Now by country singer Taylor Swift earned her second number-one. It sold over one million copies in its opening week, the first country record in history to achieve such feat.

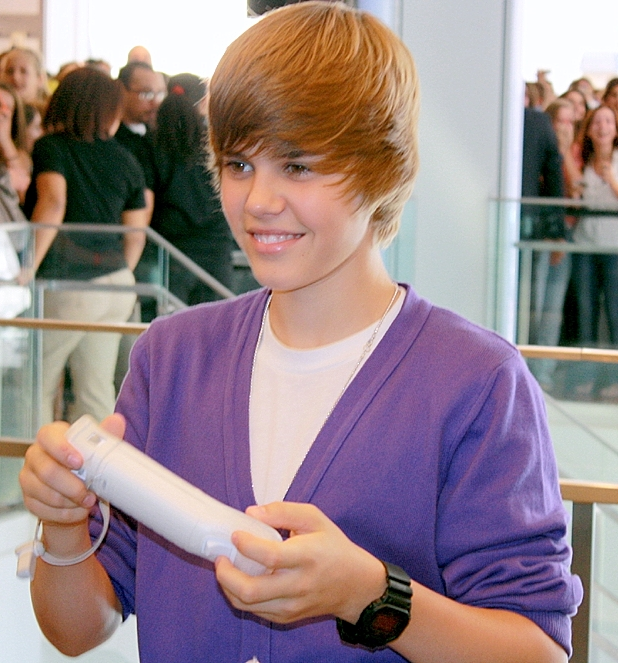
Pop singer Justin Bieber scored his first number-one with his debut album, My World 2.0, making him the youngest solo male artist to top the chart since Stevie Wonder in 1963.

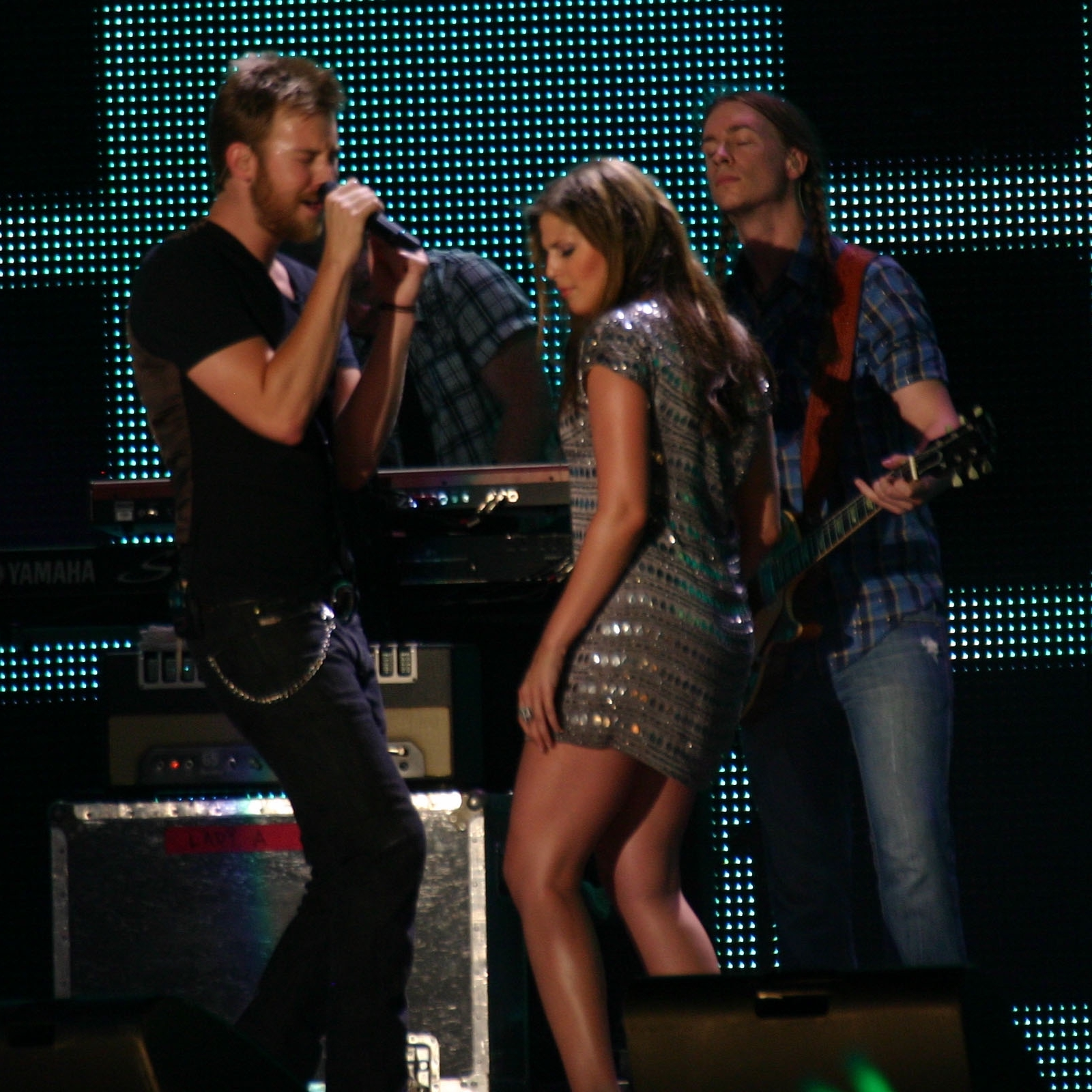
Country band Lady Antebellum scored their first number-one with Need You Now, which topped the charts for four weeks.

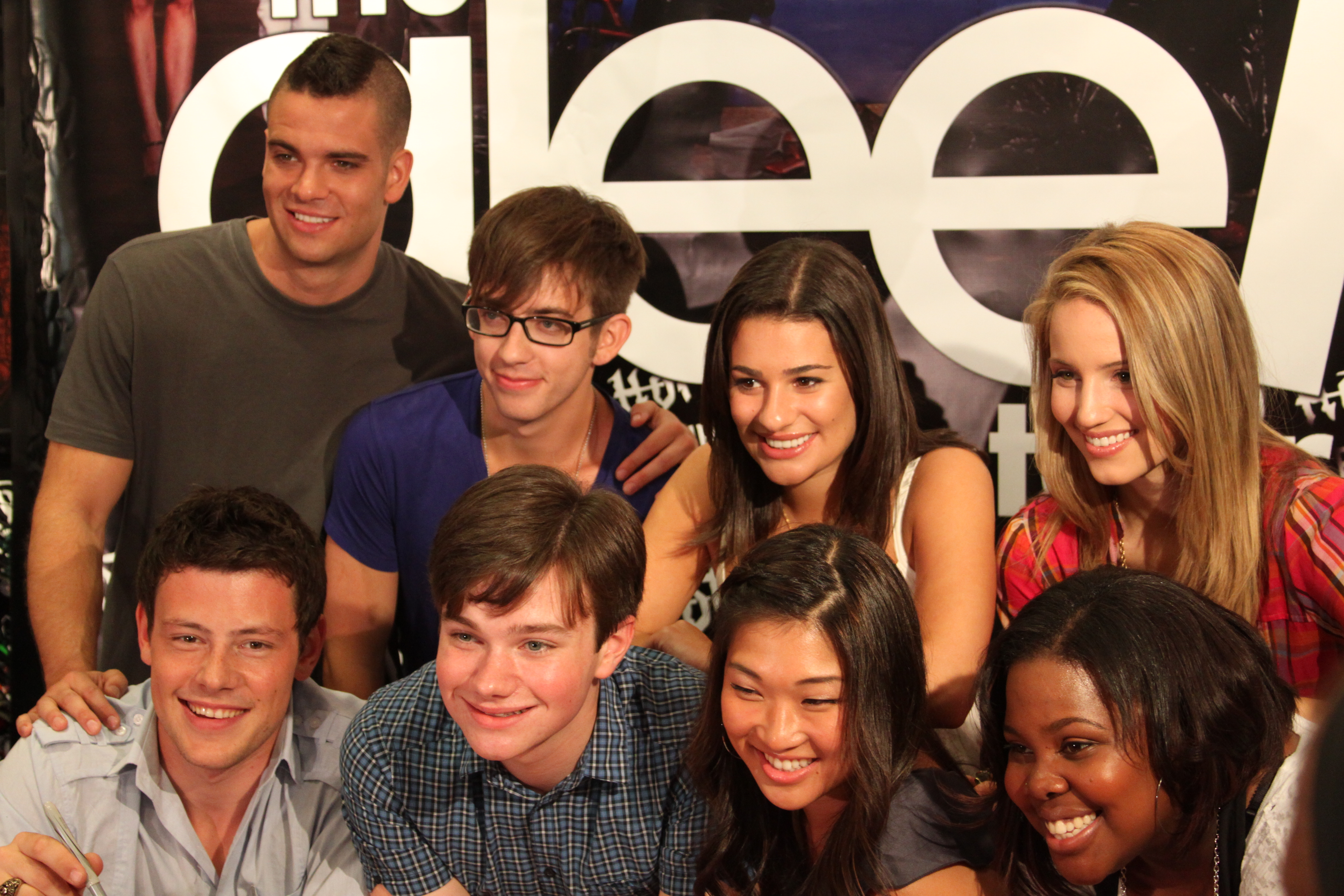
The cast of Glee topped the chart for four weeks in 2010, aided by Glee: The Music, The Power of Madonna, Glee: The Music, Volume 3 Showstoppers, and Glee: The Music, Journey to Regionals.

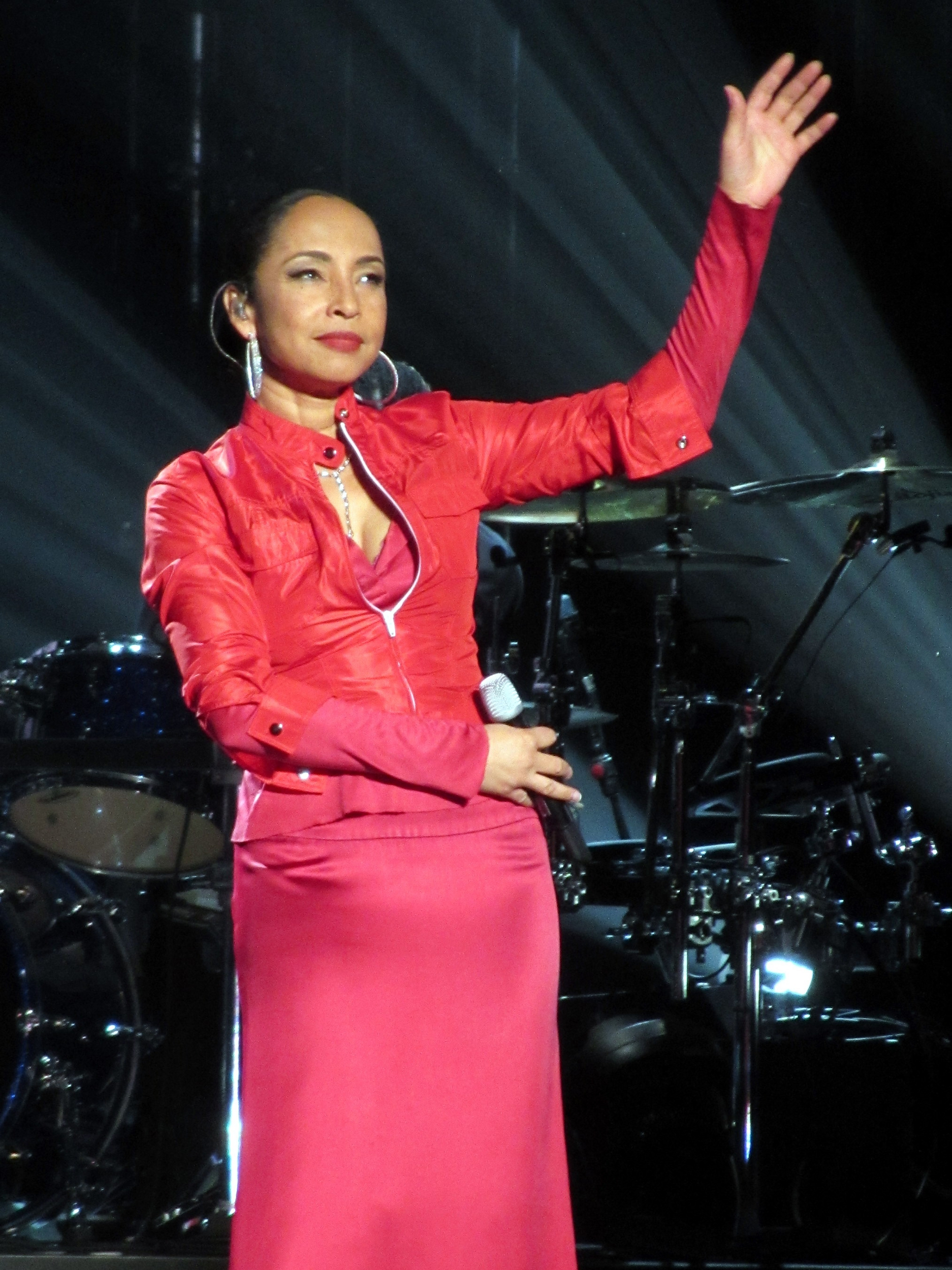
Soldier of Love by British soul band Sade (pictured; lead singer Sade Adu) marked their second number-one. It spent three consecutive weeks topping the chart.

Key
†	Indicates number-one album of the year

Issue date	Album	Artist(s)	Sales	Ref.
January 2	I Dreamed a Dream †	Susan Boyle	661,000	
January 9	I Dreamed a Dream †	Susan Boyle	510,000	
January 16	I Dreamed a Dream †	Susan Boyle	120,000	
January 23	Animal	Kesha	152,000	
January 30	Contra	Vampire Weekend	124,000	
February 6	Hope for Haiti Now	Various artists	171,000	
February 13	Need You Now	Lady Antebellum	481,000	
February 20	Need You Now	Lady Antebellum	209,000	
February 27	Soldier of Love	Sade	502,000	
March 6	Soldier of Love	Sade	190,000	
March 13	Soldier of Love	Sade	127,000	
March 20	Need You Now	Lady Antebellum	126,000	
March 27	Battle of the Sexes	Ludacris	137,000	
April 3	Need You Now	Lady Antebellum	93,000	
April 10	My World 2.0	Justin Bieber	283,000	
April 17	Raymond v. Raymond	Usher	329,000	
April 24	My World 2.0	Justin Bieber	102,000	
May 1	My World 2.0	Justin Bieber	92,000	
May 8	Glee: The Music, The Power of Madonna	Glee cast	98,000	
May 15	The Adventures of Bobby Ray	B.o.B	84,000	
May 22	The Oracle	Godsmack	117,000	
May 29	My World 2.0	Justin Bieber	60,000	
June 5	Glee: The Music, Volume 3 Showstoppers	Glee cast	136,000	
June 12	Glee: The Music, Volume 3 Showstoppers	Glee cast	63,000	
June 19	To the Sea	Jack Johnson	243,000	
June 26	Glee: The Music, Journey to Regionals	Glee cast	154,000	
July 3	Thank Me Later	Drake	447,000	
July 10	Recovery	Eminem	741,000	
July 17	Recovery	Eminem	313,000	
July 24	Recovery	Eminem	229,000	
July 31	Recovery	Eminem	195,000	
August 7	Recovery	Eminem	187,000	
August 14	Nightmare	Avenged Sevenfold	163,000	
August 21	The Suburbs	Arcade Fire	156,000	
August 28	Recovery	Eminem	133,000	
September 4	Recovery	Eminem	116,000	
September 11	Teenage Dream	Katy Perry	192,000	
September 18	Asylum	Disturbed	179,000	
September 25	Kaleidoscope Heart	Sara Bareilles	90,000	
October 2	A Thousand Suns	Linkin Park	241,000	
October 9	You Get What You Give	Zac Brown Band	153,000	
October 16	Hemingway's Whiskey	Kenny Chesney	183,000	
October 23	Bullets in the Gun	Toby Keith	71,000	
October 30	I Am Not a Human Being	Lil Wayne	125,000	
November 6	The Incredible Machine	Sugarland	203,000	
November 13	Speak Now	Taylor Swift	1,047,000	
November 20	Speak Now	Taylor Swift	320,000	
November 27	The Gift	Susan Boyle	318,000	
December 4	The Gift	Susan Boyle	335,000	
December 11	My Beautiful Dark Twisted Fantasy	Kanye West	496,000	
December 18	The Gift	Susan Boyle	272,000	
December 25	The Gift	Susan Boyle	243,000	
