= List of number-one albums of 2010 (Canada) =

These are the Canadian number-one albums of 2010. The chart is compiled by Nielsen Soundscan and published by Jam! Canoe, issued every Sunday. The chart also appears in Billboard magazine as Top Canadian Albums.

Key
†	Indicates best-performing album of 2010

Issue date	Album	Artist	Ref
January 2	I Dreamed a Dream	Susan Boyle	
January 9	I Dreamed a Dream	Susan Boyle	
January 16	I Dreamed a Dream	Susan Boyle	
January 23	Animal	Kesha	
January 30	Contra	Vampire Weekend	
February 6	Hope for Haiti Now	Various Artists	
February 13	Hope for Haiti Now	Various Artists	
February 20	2010 Grammy Nominees	Various Artists	
February 27	Soldier of Love	Sade	
March 6	Soldier of Love	Sade	
March 13	Soldier of Love	Sade	
March 20	Need You Now	Lady Antebellum	
March 27	Need You Now	Lady Antebellum	
April 3	Need You Now	Lady Antebellum	
April 10	My World 2.0	Justin Bieber	
April 17	My World 2.0	Justin Bieber	
April 24	Slash	Slash	
May 1	My World 2.0	Justin Bieber	
May 8	Glee: The Music, The Power of Madonna	Glee Cast	
May 15	Iron Man 2 (soundtrack)	AC/DC	
May 22	Forgiveness Rock Record	Broken Social Scene	
May 29	My World 2.0	Justin Bieber	
June 5	Glee: The Music, Volume 3 Showstoppers	Glee Cast	
June 12	Glee: The Music, Volume 3 Showstoppers	Glee Cast	
June 19	To The Sea	Jack Johnson	
June 26	To The Sea	Jack Johnson	
July 3	Thank Me Later	Drake	
July 10	Recovery †	Eminem	
July 17	Recovery †	Eminem	
July 24	Recovery †	Eminem	
July 31	Recovery †	Eminem	
August 7	Recovery †	Eminem	
August 14	Recovery †	Eminem	
August 21	The Suburbs	Arcade Fire	
August 28	Recovery †	Eminem	
September 4	The Final Frontier	Iron Maiden	
September 11	Teenage Dream	Katy Perry	
September 18	A Place Called Love	Johnny Reid	
September 25	A Place Called Love	Johnny Reid	
October 2	A Thousand Suns	Linkin Park	
October 9	A Place Called Love	Johnny Reid	
October 16	Americana	Roch Voisine	
October 23	A Place Called Love	Johnny Reid	
October 30	Americana	Roch Voisine	
November 6	Come Around Sundown	Kings of Leon	
November 13	Speak Now	Taylor Swift	
November 20	Speak Now	Taylor Swift	
November 27	Greatest Hits	Bon Jovi	
December 4	Loud	Rihanna	
December 11	My Beautiful Dark Twisted Fantasy	Kanye West	
December 18	The Gift	Susan Boyle	
December 25	Glee: The Music, The Christmas Album	Glee Cast	

== See also ==
- List of Hot 100 number-one singles of 2010 (Canada)
