= List of Canadian Hot 100 number-one singles of 2010 =

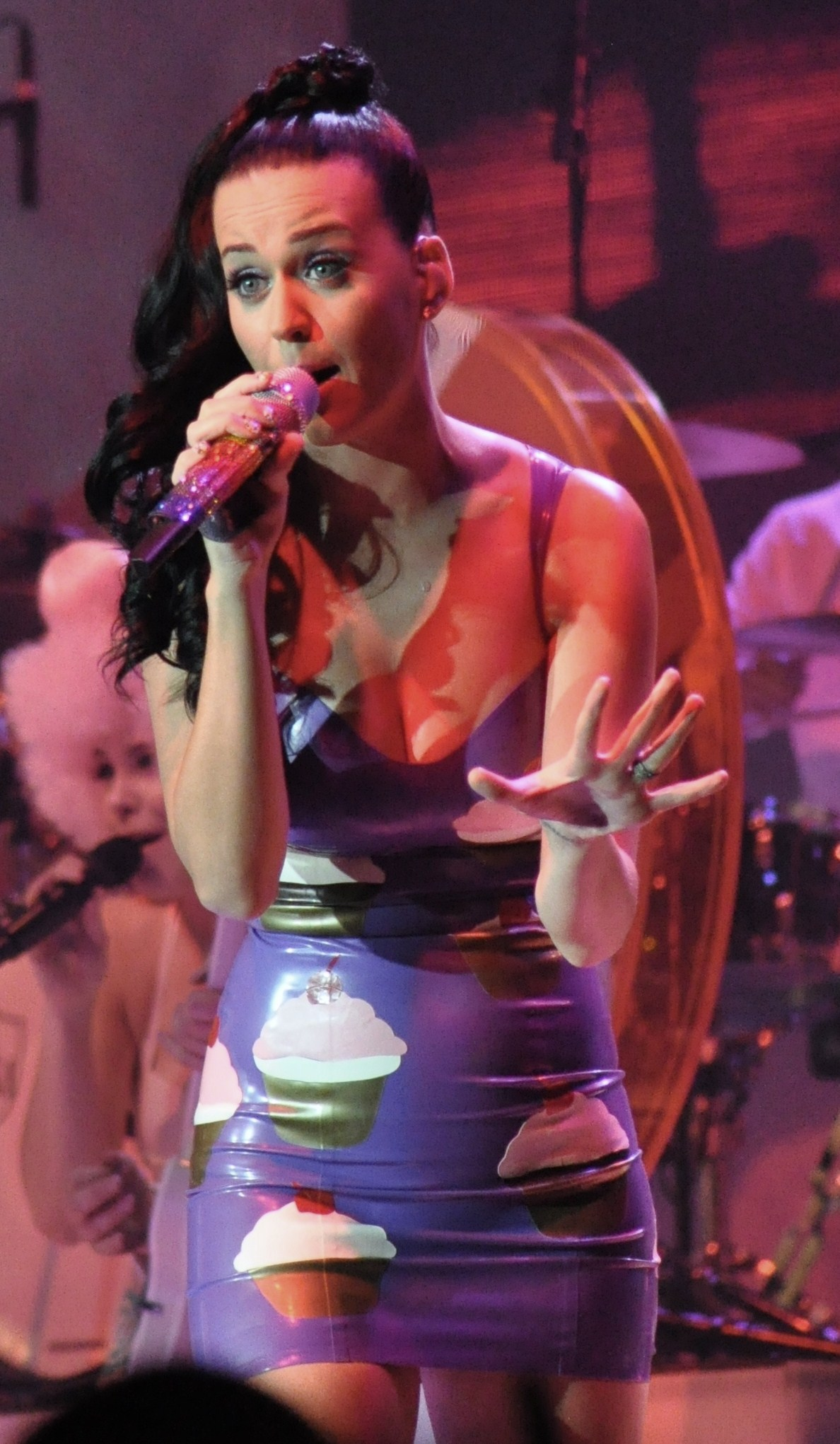
"California Gurls" by Katy Perry (pictured) featuring Snoop Dogg spent nine weeks at number one, the longest-running number-one single of 2010. It later ranked as the best-performing single of the year.

This is a list of the Canadian Billboard magazine Canadian Hot 100 number-ones of 2010.

Billboard publishes charts with an issue date approximately 7–10 days in advance.

== Chart history ==
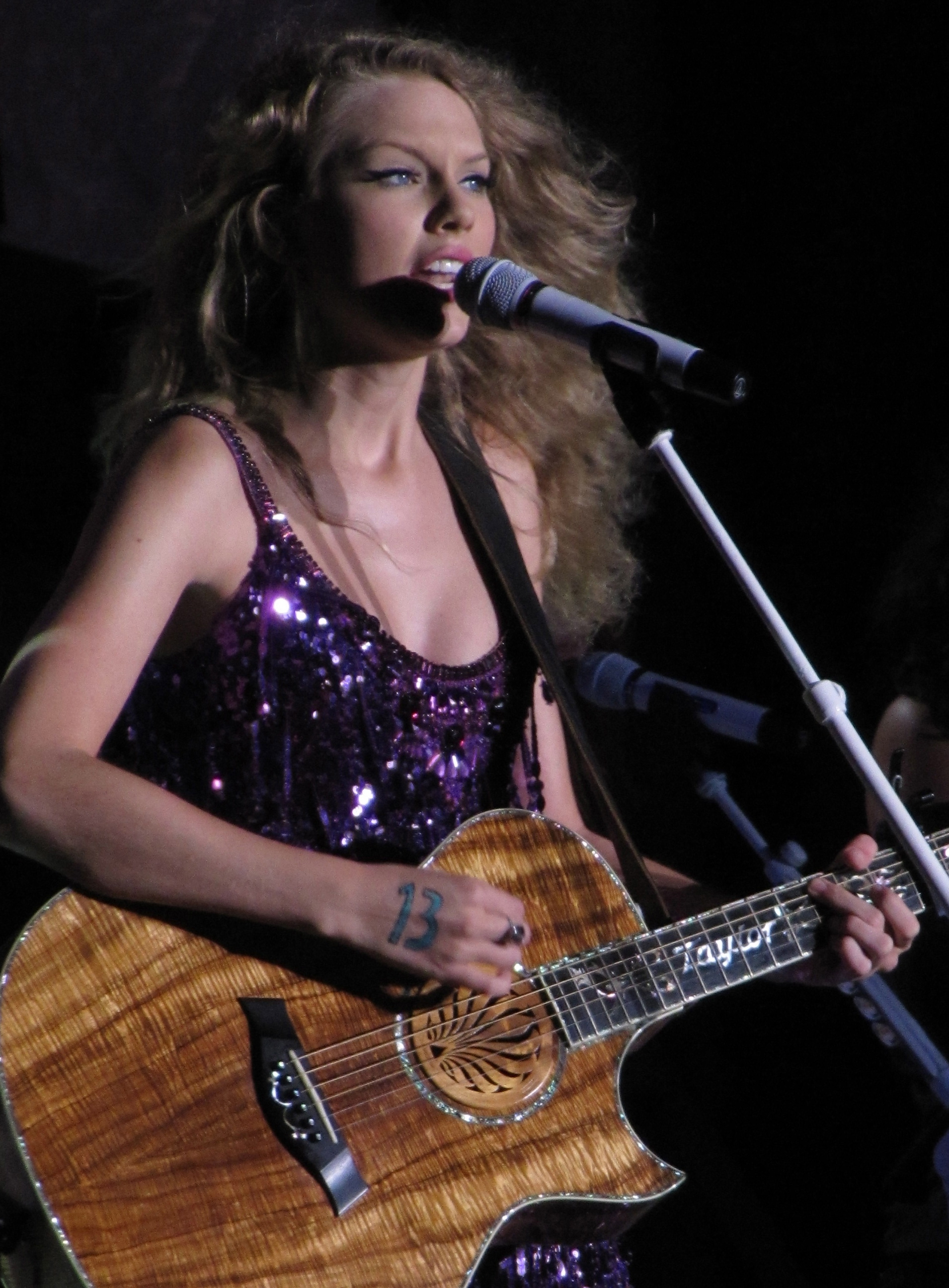
Taylor Swift (pictured)'s "Today Was a Fairytale" debuted at number one, becoming the second song to do so.

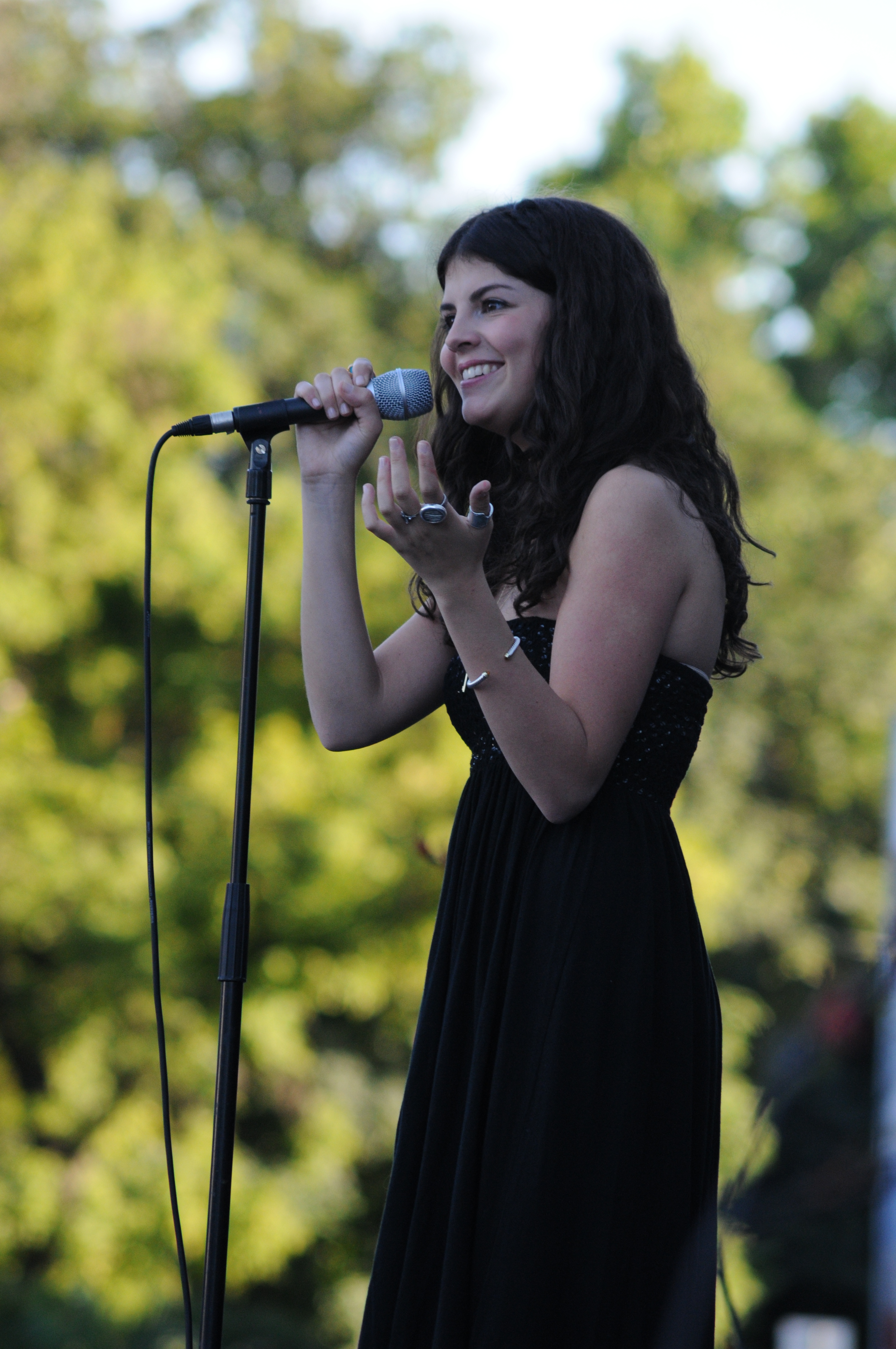
Canadian singer Nikki Yanofsky (pictured) was the youngest artist to top the Canadian Hot 100 at 16 years, 19 days old with the song "I Believe".

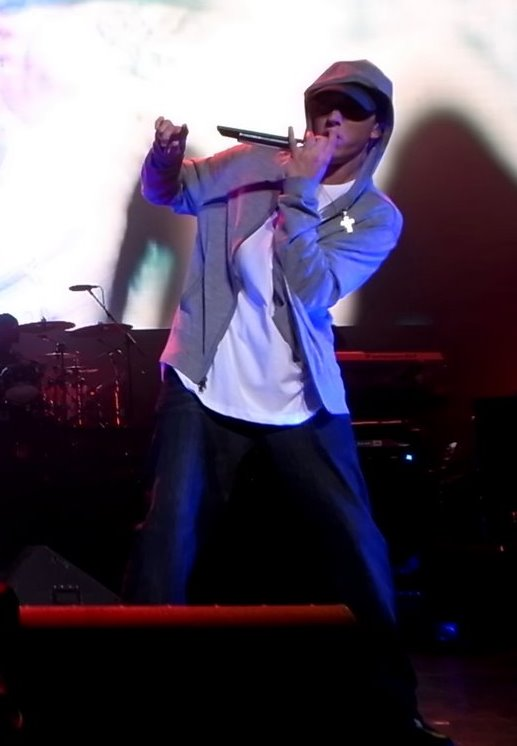
Eminem (pictured)'s "Not Afraid" debuted at number one, becoming the fourth song to do so.

Key
†	Indicates best-performing single of 2010

No.	Issue date	Song	Artist(s)	Reference
31	January 2	"Tik Tok"	Kesha	
31	January 9	"Tik Tok"	Kesha	
31	January 16	"Tik Tok"	Kesha	
31	January 23	"Tik Tok"	Kesha	
31	January 30	"Tik Tok"	Kesha	
31	February 6	"Tik Tok"	Kesha	
31	February 13	"Tik Tok"	Kesha	
32	February 20	"Today Was a Fairytale"	Taylor Swift	
33	February 27	"I Believe"	Nikki Yanofsky	
33	March 6	"I Believe"	Nikki Yanofsky	
33	March 13	"I Believe"	Nikki Yanofsky	
33	March 20	"I Believe"	Nikki Yanofsky	
34	March 27	"Wavin' Flag"	Young Artists for Haiti	
34	April 3	"Wavin' Flag"	Young Artists for Haiti	
34	April 10	"Wavin' Flag"	Young Artists for Haiti	
34	April 17	"Wavin' Flag"	Young Artists for Haiti	
34	April 24	"Wavin' Flag"	Young Artists for Haiti	
34	May 1	"Wavin' Flag"	Young Artists for Haiti	
35	May 8	"Break Your Heart"	Taio Cruz featuring Ludacris	
35	May 15	"Break Your Heart"	Taio Cruz featuring Ludacris	
36	May 22	"Not Afraid"	Eminem	
37	May 29	"California Gurls" †	Katy Perry featuring Snoop Dogg	
37	June 5	"California Gurls" †	Katy Perry featuring Snoop Dogg	
37	June 12	"California Gurls" †	Katy Perry featuring Snoop Dogg	
37	June 19	"California Gurls" †	Katy Perry featuring Snoop Dogg	
37	June 26	"California Gurls" †	Katy Perry featuring Snoop Dogg	
37	July 3	"California Gurls" †	Katy Perry featuring Snoop Dogg	
37	July 10	"California Gurls" †	Katy Perry featuring Snoop Dogg	
37	July 17	"California Gurls" †	Katy Perry featuring Snoop Dogg	
37	July 24	"California Gurls" †	Katy Perry featuring Snoop Dogg	
38	July 31	"Love the Way You Lie"	Eminem featuring Rihanna	
38	August 7	"Love the Way You Lie"	Eminem featuring Rihanna	
38	August 14	"Love the Way You Lie"	Eminem featuring Rihanna	
38	August 21	"Love the Way You Lie"	Eminem featuring Rihanna	
38	August 28	"Love the Way You Lie"	Eminem featuring Rihanna	
38	September 4	"Love the Way You Lie"	Eminem featuring Rihanna	
38	September 11	"Love the Way You Lie"	Eminem featuring Rihanna	
39	September 18	"Dynamite"	Taio Cruz	
40	September 25	"I Like It"	Enrique Iglesias featuring Pitbull	
41	October 2	"Only Girl (In the World)"	Rihanna	
42	October 9	"Just the Way You Are"	Bruno Mars	
42	October 16	"Just the Way You Are"	Bruno Mars	
42	October 23	"Just the Way You Are"	Bruno Mars	
42	October 30	"Just the Way You Are"	Bruno Mars	
re	November 6	"Only Girl (In the World)"	Rihanna	
re	November 13	"Only Girl (In the World)"	Rihanna	
re	November 20	"Only Girl (In the World)"	Rihanna	
43	November 27	"The Time (Dirty Bit)"	The Black Eyed Peas	
43	December 4	"The Time (Dirty Bit)"	The Black Eyed Peas	
43	December 11	"The Time (Dirty Bit)"	The Black Eyed Peas	
44	December 18	"Firework"	Katy Perry	
re	December 25	"The Time (Dirty Bit)"	The Black Eyed Peas	

== See also ==
- 2010 in music
- List of number-one singles in Canada
- List of number-one albums of 2010 (Canada)
