= Glee: The Music, Journey to Regionals =

EP by Glee Cast
- Released: June 8, 2010
- Recorded: 2010
- Genre: Pop, rock
- Length: 22:38
- Label: Columbia / 20th Century Fox TV
- Producer: Adam Anders; Peer Åström; Ryan Murphy

Glee Cast chronology
Glee: The Music, Volume 3 Showstoppers (2010)	Glee: The Music, Journey to Regionals (2010)	Glee: The Music, The Rocky Horror Glee Show (2010)

Glee: The Music, Journey to Regionals is the second extended play (EP) by the cast of musical television series Glee. Containing six songs from the season one finale "Journey to Regionals", it was released on June 8, 2010, the same day the episode aired. Half of the tracks are cover versions of songs by American rock band Journey. The EP debuted at the top of the US Billboard 200 and Soundtrack charts, with first-week sales of 154,000 copies. Unlike previous Glee releases, no singles were released from this album, but all of its tracks managed to appear on multiple national charts. Songs were generally received favorably, with many enjoying the Journey covers. The setlist of Glee Live! In Concert!, the cast's first concert tour, included three songs from the Glee: The Music, Journey to Regionals.

== Background and composition ==
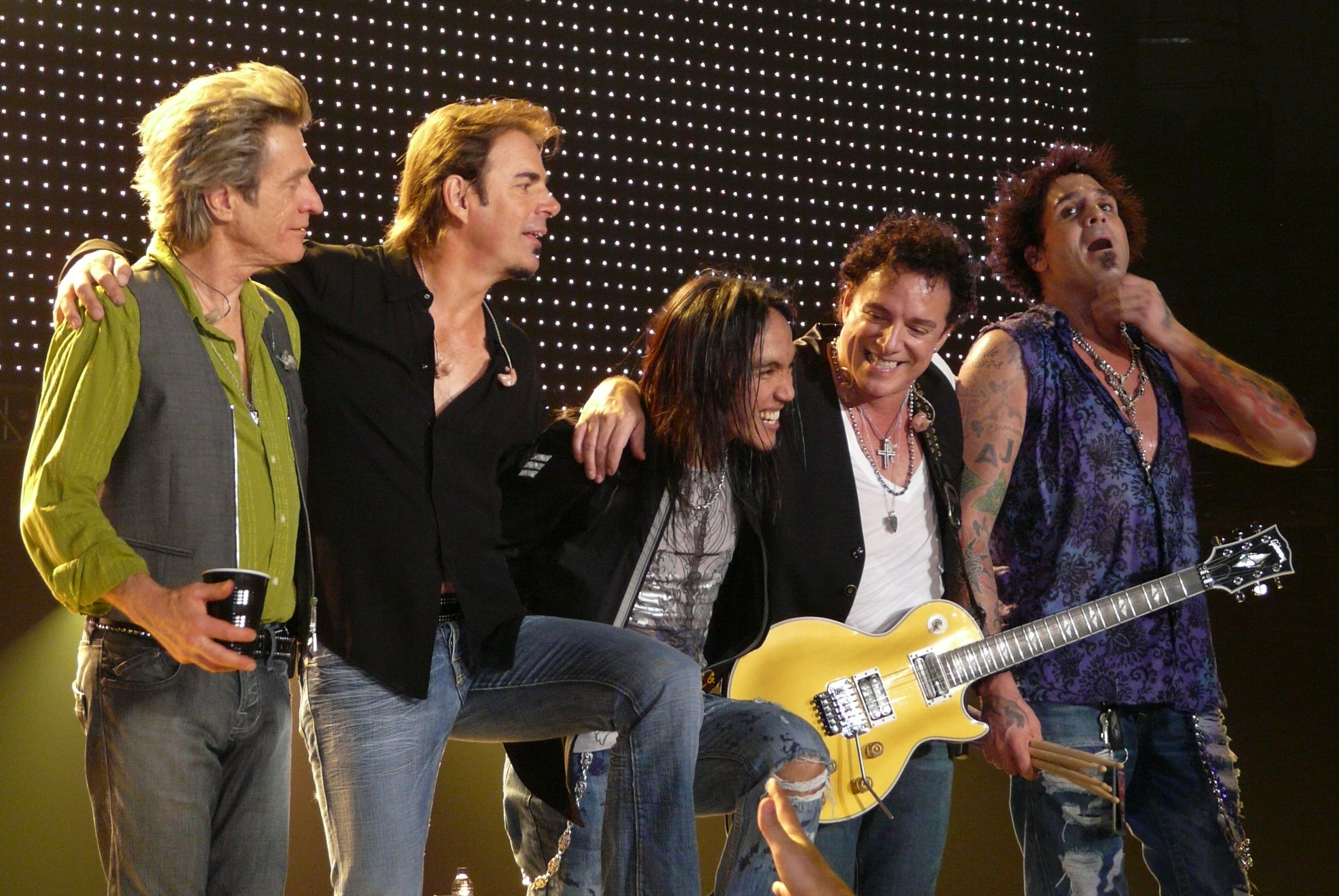
Three of the six tracks on the EP are covers of songs by Journey (current lineup pictured).

The season one finale of Glee first aired on Fox on June 8, 2010, in the US. The episode sees the fictional William McKinley High School glee club New Directions compete at the 2010 Midwest Regional Show Choir Championships. Director Will Schuester (Matthew Morrison) decides to have New Directions pay tribute to American rock band Journey. This was not only as homage to the cast's cover of "Don't Stop Believin'" in the season one premiere that led to his decision to remain at the school, but as a representation of the path undertaken to arrive at the Regionals level of competition. They perform a medley of Journey songs: the love ballad "Faithfully", with Lea Michele and Cory Monteith on lead vocals as Rachel Berry and Finn Hudson, respectively, transitions into a mashup of "Any Way You Want It" and "Lovin', Touchin', Squeezin'". This ends with a reprise of "Don't Stop Believin'", where each cast member sings a portion of the song. Rival choir Vocal Adrenaline performs a cover of Queen's "Bohemian Rhapsody" thereafter, with Jesse (Jonathan Groff) on lead vocals. At the end of the episode, New Directions decides to show appreciation for Schuester with a rendition of Lulu's "To Sir With Love", the theme of the 1967 film of the same name. He returns the honor, performing Israel Kamakawiwoʻole's reinvention of "Over the Rainbow" along with glee club member Puck (Mark Salling).

The EP, along with its track listing, was announced in an official press release on May 26, 2010. It was released on June 8, 2010 in the US, and on June 14, 2010, in the UK. "Lovin', Touchin', Squeezin'" was previously covered in the series' pilot episode. The 1981 single "Don't Stop Believin'" was also previously performed in the pilot, as well as in the season one episode "The Rhodes Not Taken". The songs in the EP all fall under the genres of pop and rock.

== Critical reception ==
Professional ratings
Review scores
Source	Rating
AllMusic	2.5/5 stars
The Denver Post	(favorable)

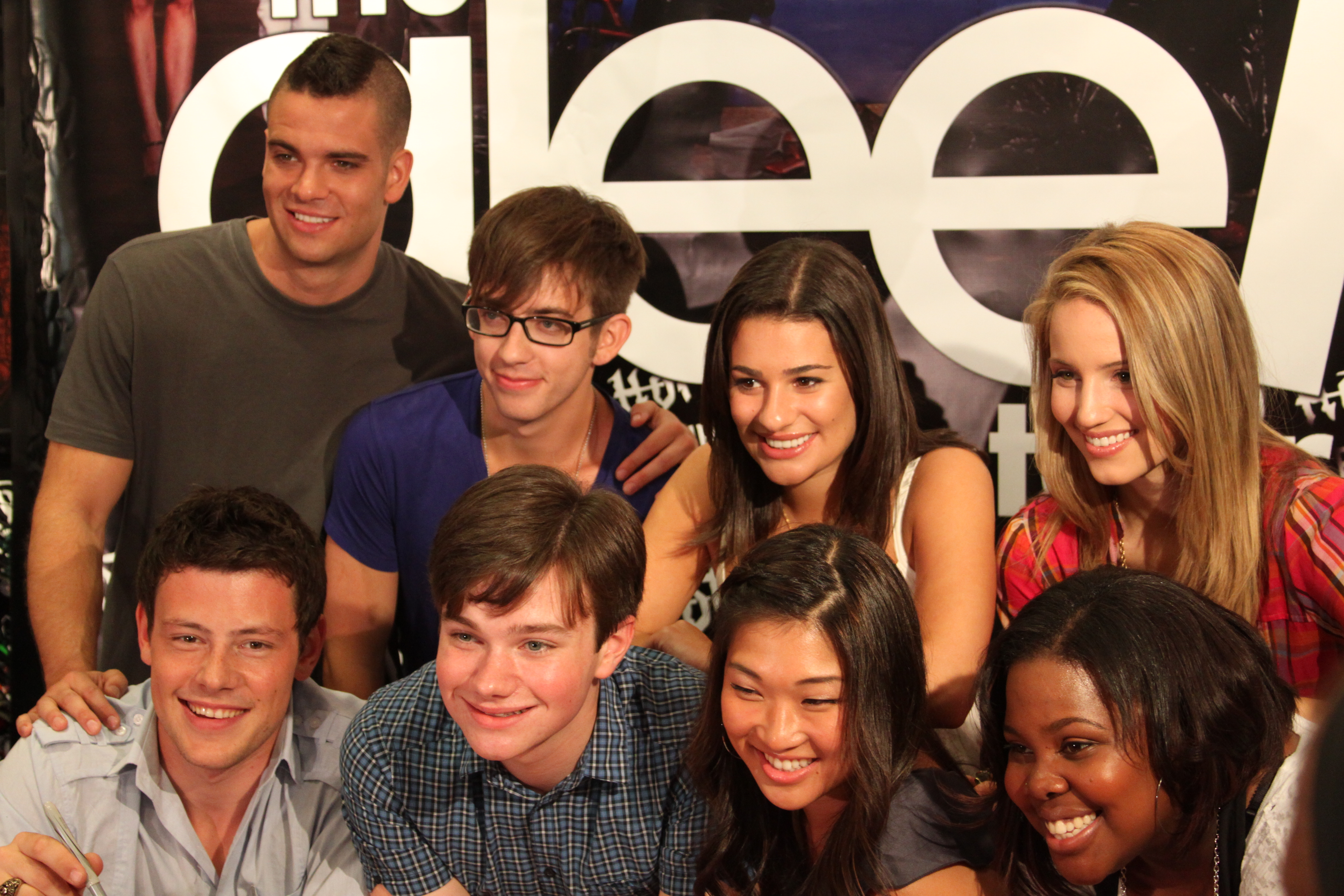
The Journey medley performed by the cast of Glee (pictured) was generally received favorably.

The Denver Post's Ricardo Baca enjoyed the familiar nature of the songs on the EP, and liked "Faithfully" best of the Journey covers. He felt, however, that the music of "Don't Stop Believin'" outshone the vocals of the cast. Andrew Leahey of AllMusic gave the album a rating of two-and-a-half stars out of five. A writer for Reuters called the Journey medley "heartfelt and uplifting" and Jessica Derschowitz of CBS News found it "fantastic". Gerrick Kennedy also enjoyed it, highlighting its emotional nature and complimenting the entire cast's vocals. IGN's Eric Goldman thought the reprise of "Don't Stop Believin'" worked well, and liked not only the connection to the pilot, but also its musical rearrangement. Bobby Hankinson of The Houston Chronicle enjoyed "Don't Stop Believin'" best of the performances but Vanity Fair's Brett Berk deemed it unnecessary in the medley, and felt the cast would have done better to showcase more of "Lovin', Touchin', Squeezin'". Berk enjoyed "Bohemian Rhapsody" best, giving it a rating of four stars out of a possible five, though he thought it was too predictable a song choice. Time's James Poniewozik opined the song was one of Glee's best, but was contemplative of which choir's performance was the better. Berk felt the lyrical context of "To Sir With Love" was trite and Hankinson was impressed by the song, calling it "sweet". "Over the Rainbow" was called "lovely" by the former and Derschowitz decided it was a "perfect" closing song.

Former Journey frontman Steve Perry gave an interview to American magazine RadarOnline, as co-writer of several Journey tracks, and praised the use of his songs on the show: "Glee has opened up a international catalog of songwriting and introduced those songs to a whole new generation that would have otherwise never heard them." The Regionals version of "Don't Stop Believin'" earned a Grammy nomination for Best Pop Performance by a Duo or Group with Vocals for the ceremonies in 2011. Following this nomination, the song was included on the compilation album 2011 Grammy Nominees.

== Chart performance ==
The EP debuted at number one on both the US Billboard 200 and Soundtracks charts, selling 154,000 copies there. The album became the cast's third number-one album on the Billboard 200. Reaching the top of the chart on June 26, 2010, it did so three weeks after Glee: The Music, Volume 3 Showstoppers. This beat the cast's own record for the shortest span between number-one debuts with different releases, previously held with Glee: The Music, The Power of Madonna and Volume 3 Showstoppers. It entered at number two in Canada and the United Kingdom, selling 14,000 copies in the former. On the Irish Albums Chart, Journey to Regionals entered the week of June 10, 2010 at number 14 and ascended to the top position the next week, taking the spot from Volume 3 Showstoppers. The EP entered at number seven in Australia on July 4, 2010, climbing four places to its peak three weeks later, and in Mexico, a peak of fifty-nine was reached. Second-week sales in the US amounted to 39,000 copies as the EP dropped to the tenth position on the Billboard 200. The EP has spent a total of 39 weeks on the Soundtracks chart.

Although none of the tracks were released as singles, all of the tracks managed to chart in several countries (with the new version of "Don't Stop Believin'" charting under the original entry). On the Billboard Hot 100, "Faithfully" debuted highest the week of June 26, 2010, at number 37. The same week on the Canadian Hot 100, "Over the Rainbow" led the Glee debuts at number 31. The song was also highest on the Australian and UK Singles Chart, at numbers 42 and 30, respectively. In Ireland, "Any Way You Want It / Lovin' Touchin' Squeezin'" charted as highest of the Glee entries at number twenty on June 17, 2010. "Don't Stop Believin'" was regarded as a re-entry of the group's debut single by most chart companies; in addition to the debut of the new tracks, it climbed from 71 to 33 in the UK and from 49 to 24 in Ireland. It re-entered the single charts of the US at 59 and Canada at 37, setting a new peak for the song in the latter. Only the Australian Recording Industry Association regarded it as a separate song, who placed it at number 67 the week of July 12, 2010.

With sales figures provided by Nielsen SoundScan, a list of the twenty most successful Glee songs was released by Yahoo! Music on October 22, 2010. The best-selling song, with 1,005,000 copies sold, was "Don't Stop Believin'"—84,000 of those came from sales of the Regionals reprise. "Faithfully" was also on the list, at number eighteen with 159,000 copies. The EP's five new Billboard Hot 100 entries brought the cast's total appearances on the chart to 64, an accomplishment that placed them seventh among all artists, between Elton John (67) and Stevie Wonder (63). Billboard noted an increase in sales of the original seven songs rising in percentages ranging from 23% ("Don't Stop Believin'") to 557% ("To Sir With Love"). Additionally, Journey's compilation Greatest Hits (1988) saw a 62% increase in sales, rising from 104 to 57 on the Billboard 200.

== Promotion ==
The cast embarked on an American concert tour, Glee Live! In Concert! starting in May 2010 in promotion of their first season. From the EP, "Faithfully" and "Any Way You Want It / Lovin' Touchin' Squeezin'" were included on the set list. Morrison appeared on dates in New York City to sing "Over the Rainbow" whilst playing the ukulele. He was accompanied by Salling when he again sang the number at the annual White House Easter Egg Roll in 2010. In addition, he also performed the song at The O_{2} Arena in London with Leona Lewis on June 16, 2010, as part of Lewis' tour, The Labyrinth. On December 5, 2010, the cast appeared on the seventh season of UK reality TV series The X Factor to perform "Don't Stop Believin'".

== Track listing ==
No.	Title	Writer(s)	Version covered	Length
1.	"Faithfully"	Jonathan Cain	Journey	4:35
2.	"Any Way You Want It / Lovin' Touchin' Squeezin'"	Steve Perry, Neal Schon	Journey	3:09
3.	"Don't Stop Believin'" (Regionals version)	Cain, Perry, Schon	Journey	3:43
4.	"Bohemian Rhapsody" (featuring Jonathan Groff)	Freddie Mercury	Queen	5:57
5.	"To Sir With Love"	Don Black, Mark London	Lulu	2:43
6.	"Over The Rainbow"	Harold Arlen, E.Y. Harburg	Israel Kamakawiwoʻole	2:31

== Personnel ==
Source: allmusic.

=== Musicians ===
- Dianna Agron – vocals
- Harold Arlen – composer
- Don Black – composer
- Jonathan Cain – composer
- Chris Colfer – vocals, featured vocals
- Jonathan Groff – featured vocals
- E.Y. "Yip" Harburg – composer
- Mark London – composer
- Jane Lynch – vocals (credit only)
- Jayma Mays – vocals (credit only)
- Kevin McHale – vocals, featured vocals
- Freddie Mercury – composer
- Lea Michele – vocals, featured vocals
- Cory Monteith – vocals, featured vocals
- Matthew Morrison – featured vocals
- Steve Perry – composer
- Amber Riley – vocals, featured vocals
- Naya Rivera – vocals, featured vocals
- Mark Salling – vocals, featured vocals
- Neal Schon – composer
- Jenna Ushkowitz – vocals, featured vocals

=== Technical ===
- Adam Anders – engineer, producer, soundtrack producer, vocal arrangement
- Peer Åström – engineer, mixing, producer
- Dave Bett – art direction, design
- P.J. Bloom – music supervisor
- Geoff Bywater – executive in charge of music
- Tim Davis – vocal arrangement, vocal contractor
- Dante Di Loreto – soundtrack executive producer
- Brad Falchuk – soundtrack executive producer
- Heather Guibert – coordination
- Robin Koehler – coordination
- Meaghan Lyons – coordination
- Dominick Maita – mastering
- Maria Paula Marulanda – art direction, design
- Ryan Murphy – producer, soundtrack producer
- Ryan Peterson – engineer
- Miranda Penn Turin – photography

== Charts ==
=== Weekly charts ===
Chart (2010)	Peak position
Australian Albums Chart	3
Canadian Albums Chart	2
Irish Albums Chart	1
Mexican Albums Chart	59
UK Albums Chart	2
US Billboard 200	1
US Billboard Soundtracks	1

=== Year-end charts ===
Chart (2010)	Rank
US Billboard 200	92
US Billboard Soundtracks	9

== Release history ==
Region	Release date
Canada	June 8, 2010
Japan	June 8, 2010
United States	June 8, 2010
Ireland	June 11, 2010
United Kingdom	June 14, 2010
Australia	June 18, 2010
New Zealand	June 21, 2010
Taiwan	August 10, 2010
