= Glee: The Music, The Power of Madonna =

EP by Glee Cast
- Released: April 20, 2010
- Recorded: 2010
- Genre: Dance-pop
- Length: 27:16
- Label: Columbia
- Producer: Adam Anders; Peer Åström; Ryan Murphy

Glee Cast chronology
Glee: The Music, Volume 2 (2009)	Glee: The Music, The Power of Madonna (2010)	Glee: The Music, Volume 3 Showstoppers (2010)

Glee: The Music, The Power of Madonna is the debut extended play (EP) by the cast of the musical television series Glee. It contains eight songs from the season one Glee episode, "The Power of Madonna", which was a tribute episode dedicated to American recording artist Madonna. She had sold the rights to her entire catalog of music to Glee in 2009, and producers of the show developed the episode called "The Power of Madonna"; the show featured a number of cover versions of Madonna's songs by the cast. The accompanying EP released with the airing of the show was called Glee: The Music, The Power of Madonna.

After its release, it received generally positive reviews from the critics, who frequently cited Glee's cover version of Madonna's "Like a Prayer" as a stand-out track from the album. The EP debuted at number one on the Billboard 200 albums chart, with 98,000 copies in the first week in the United States, the highest debut for a Glee soundtrack. It also reached the top of the chart in Canada, and the top ten in Australia, Ireland and the United Kingdom. The release of the EP saw an increase in the catalog sales of Madonna's albums too. All songs from The Power of Madonna were released as singles with the exception of "Burning Up". "Like a Prayer" charted highest in all regions, reaching number 27 on the US Billboard Hot 100, and selling 87,000 digital downloads there.

== Background ==
In 2009, Madonna granted Glee the rights to her entire catalogue of music, and the producers planned an episode which would feature Madonna songs exclusively. Series creator Ryan Murphy had worked with Madonna in the past, and wished to produce a Glee tribute to her. Madonna agreed and "cooperated in every way possible", for the episode "The Power of Madonna". The episode featured the show's fictional glee club director Will Schuester, portrayed by actor Matthew Morrison, assigning the students in the club to sing Madonna songs because the girls were being subjected to sexist treatment by the boys; he hoped the entire glee club would learn from the messages of girl-power and equality in such Madonna songs as "Express Yourself".

Glee: The Music, The Power of Madonna, an extended play (EP) containing studio recordings of songs performed in the episode, was released on April 20, 2010. Its track list encompasses "Express Yourself", a mash-up of "Borderline" and "Open Your Heart", "Vogue", "Like a Virgin, "4 Minutes", "What It Feels Like for a Girl", and "Like a Prayer". The iTunes edition featured a bonus track, "Burning Up", which was not performed in the episode. Although they were not performed by the show's cast, Madonna's "Ray of Light", "Burning Up", "Justify My Love", and "Frozen" were also used as backing tracks in the episode.

== Reception ==
=== Critical response ===
Professional ratings
Review scores
Source	Rating
AllMusic	3.5/5 stars
BBC	mixed
Digital Spy	4/5 stars
Entertainment Weekly	A
Seattle Post-Intelligencer	positive
Star Tribune	negative

The album has received generally positive reviews from critics. Fraser McAlpine of the BBC wrote: "At its best, it's a loving homage; at worst it's like the re-made pop music retailers play in shops to avoid paying proper royalties." He felt that: "As they are essentially photocopies of the originals, the songs depend on the context of the show to make sense. So listening to the album on musical merits alone is close to pointless." AllMusic's Andrew Leahey rated the album 3.5/5, writing: "It's a short release, but it also holds its ground against the two albums that preceded it, namely because the material is so compatible with the show itself. Madonna's music has always thrived on drama, and it lends itself well to Glee's theater-pop approach, which tends to bring out the cheese in even the most serious of songs." Nick Levine of Digital Spy rated the EP 4/5, praising the "imaginative reworking" of "What It Feels Like For a Girl", and noting: "if the Glee treatment encourages a few younger pop fans to invest in Madonna's stellar recent hits collection, it can only be viewed as a good thing. And for those in the know, hearing five members of this thoroughly likable cast trilling "Like A Virgin" in harmony is so downright gleeful, well, it's almost like being touched for the very first time."

Sahar Ghosh from Seattle Post-Intelligencer felt that the best songs on the EP were "What It Feels Like for a Girl" and "Like a Prayer", saying that "the lyrics Madonna sang in 2001 [for 'What It Feels Like for a Girl'] still (unfortunately) ring true today, but they acquire a new poignancy as they are sung by the boys in Glee Club. [...] But the best performance of the album is definitely 'Like a Prayer'. The talented voices of the Glee cast, backed by a full choir, masterfully carry the lyrics to greater heights." Mikael Wood from Entertainment Weekly gave it an "A" rating, explaining "Sue hilariously revises the spoken-word bit on 'Vogue', and the Glee guys give a surprisingly tender reading of 'What It Feels Like for a Girl'. Go ahead — open your heart." David Hiltbrand from Star Tribune gave a negative review of the EP saying that "things go downhill as soon as Jane Lynch starts camping up the spoken portion of 'Vogue'. By the time you get to 'Like a Virgin' and '4 Minutes', the songs sound overproduced and melodramatic, more show tune than disco."

=== Commercial performance ===
In its first week of release in the United States, Glee: The Music, The Power of Madonna reached number one on the Billboard 200, with 98,000 copies sold. It became the first album by the Glee cast to debut at the top of the chart, also the first number one album consisting totally of covers of one artist's songs, since the all-ABBA Mamma Mia! The Movie Soundtrack reigned for a week in August 2008. According to Nielsen SoundScan, 75 percent of the sales were due to digital downloads from online stores. It was also the Top Digital and Top Soundtrack album of the week. The release of the EP also had its impact on Madonna's own catalog. Her Celebration greatest hits album re-entered Billboard 200 at number 86 with sales of 6,000 (up 219%). Her total catalog of albums saw a 44% jump in sales, selling 17,000 that week. Her digital song download tally also got a boost with total tracks sold being 108,000, up 169% compared to the week previous (40,000). Her two biggest-selling songs of the week were "4 Minutes" and "Like a Prayer"—each selling 12,000 with gains of 183% and 267%, respectively.

In Canada, the album debuted at the top of the Canadian Albums Chart, with sales of 23,000 according to Nielsen SoundScan. In Australia, the EP debuted at number 14 on the Australian Albums Chart. After two weeks it reached a peak of number 10, and was present for a total of seven weeks on the chart. In Belgium's Wallonia region and in the Netherlands, the EP charted at the lower strata of the chart. It was more successful in Mexico, where it debuted at number 47 on the Mexican Albums Chart, and reached a peak of 34, the next week, staying on the chart for a total of eight weeks. After its release in United Kingdom, Glee: The Music, The Power of Madonna entered The Official UK Albums Chart at number four. However, it had sharp drops for the next weeks, and was present for a total of eight weeks. In Ireland the EP debuted at number 22 on the Albums Chart, and moved to its peak of number five the next week.

== Singles ==
All songs on the EP, apart from the bonus track, were also released as singles, available for digital download. Among the releases, Glee's version of "Like a Prayer" became the highest selling song of the bunch. It sold 87,000 copies of digital downloads to enter the Hot Digital Songs chart at number 10, also charting on the Billboard Hot 100 at number 27. "Like a Prayer" also charted at number 27 on the Canadian Hot 100, and number 28 in Australia. "Like a Prayer" was also successful in the United Kingdom, where it reached number 16 on the UK Singles Chart, and was present for four weeks. Other songs charting there included "4 Minutes", "Like a Virgin" and "Borderline / Open Your Heart" at positions 42, 58 and 66 respectively.

== Track listing ==
Information is taken from Liner Notes

Glee: The Music, The Power of Madonna – Standard edition
No.	Title	Writer(s)	Original artist(s)	Length
1.	"Express Yourself"	Madonna; Stephen Bray	Madonna	4:01
2.	"Borderline" / "Open Your Heart"	Reggie Lucas /: Madonna; Peter Rafelson; Gardner Cole	Madonna	2:18
3.	"Vogue"	Madonna; Shep Pettibone	Madonna	5:15
4.	"Like a Virgin" (featuring Jonathan Groff)	Billy Steinberg; Tom Kelly	Madonna	3:17
5.	"4 Minutes"	Madonna; Timbaland; Justin Timberlake; Nathaniel “Danja” Hills	Madonna featuring Justin Timberlake and Timbaland	3:11
6.	"What It Feels Like for a Girl"	Madonna; Guy Sigsworth; David Torn	Madonna	4:32
7.	"Like a Prayer" (featuring Jonathan Groff)	Madonna; Patrick Leonard	Madonna	5:15

Glee: The Music, The Power of Madonna – iTunes bonus track US/UK
No.	Title	Writer(s)	Original artist(s)	Length
8.	"Burning Up" (featuring Jonathan Groff)	Madonna	Madonna	3:06

== Credits and personnel ==
- Dianna Agron – vocals
- Adam Anders – arranger, engineer, producer, soundtrack producer
- Peer Åström – engineer, mixing, producer
- Dave Bett – art direction, design
- PJ Bloom – music supervisor
- Stephen Bray – composer
- Geoff Bywater – executive in charge of music
- Madonna Ciccone – composer
- Gardner Cole – composer
- Chris Colfer – vocals
- Tim Davis – arranger, vocal contractor
- Dante Di Loreto – soundtrack executive producer
- Brad Falchuk – soundtrack executive producer
- Jonathan Groff – vocals
- Floyd Nathaniel Hills – composer
- Tom Kelly – composer
- Michael Lavine – cover photo
- Jane Lynch – vocals
- Dominick Malta – mastering
- Maria Paula Marulanda – art direction, design
- Jayma Mays – vocals
- Kevin McHale – vocals
- Lea Michele – vocals
- Cory Monteith – vocals
- Timothy Mosley – composer
- Ryan Murphy – producer, soundtrack producer
- Ryan Peterson – engineer
- Shep Pettibone – composer
- Peter Rafelson – composer
- Amber Riley – vocals
- Naya Rivera – vocals
- Mark Salling – vocals
- Guy Sigsworth – composer
- Billy Steinberg – composer
- Justin Timberlake – composer
- David Torn – composer
- Jenna Ushkowitz – vocals

Credits adapted as per Allmusic credit notes.

== Charts ==
=== Weekly charts ===
Chart (2010)	Peak position
Australian Albums (ARIA)	10
Belgian Albums (Ultratop Wallonia)	97
Canadian Albums (Billboard)	1
Dutch Albums (Album Top 100)	93
Irish Albums (IRMA)	5
Mexican Albums (Top 100 Mexico)	34
UK Albums (OCC)	4
US Billboard 200	1
US Soundtrack Albums (Billboard)	1

=== Year-end charts ===
Chart (2010)	Position
UK Albums (OCC)	172
US Billboard 200	146
US Soundtrack Albums (Billboard)	13

Chart (2011)	Position
France (SNEP)	77

== Certification ==
Region	Certification	Certified units/sales
United Kingdom (BPI)	Silver	60,000^{^}
^{^} Shipments figures based on certification alone.

== Release history ==
Region	Release date	Format
Canada	April 20, 2010	CD; digital download
Ireland	April 20, 2010	CD; digital download
United States	April 20, 2010	CD; digital download
Australia	April 23, 2010	CD; digital download
United Kingdom	April 26, 2010	CD; digital download
Taiwan	May 20, 2010	CD; digital download
Japan	June 8, 2010	CD; digital download
Brazil	August 3, 2010	CD; digital download
Germany	April 8, 2011	CD; digital download
Poland	May 13, 2011	CD; digital download

== See also ==
- List of number-one albums of 2010 (Canada)
- List of Billboard 200 number-one albums of 2010
