= Glee: The Music, Volume 3 Showstoppers =

Soundtrack album by Glee Cast
- Released: 18 May 2010
- Recorded: 2009–2010
- Genres: Pop, rock, show tune, soundtrack
- Length: 54:16 (Standard edition); 72:55 (Deluxe edition)
- Label: Columbia / 20th Century Fox TV
- Producers: Dante Di Loreto (exec.), Brad Falchuk (exec.), Adam Anders, Tim Davis, Peer Åström, Dominick Maita, Ryan Murphy, Ryan Petersen

Glee Cast chronology
Glee: The Music, The Power of Madonna (2010)	Glee: The Music, Volume 3 Showstoppers (2010)	Glee: The Music, Journey to Regionals (2010)

Glee: The Music, Volume 3 Showstoppers is a soundtrack album by the cast of the American television series Glee. The album contains songs from the second half of the show's first season, except for the episodes "The Power of Madonna" and "Journey to Regionals", songs from which feature on the extended plays Glee: The Music, The Power of Madonna and Glee: The Music, Journey to Regionals respectively. The album was released on May 18, 2010. Two editions are available: a standard edition containing 14 songs, and a deluxe edition, featuring 20 songs. Showstoppers debuted at No. 1 on the US Billboard 200, selling 136,000 copies in the first week. On November 21, 2010, it was announced that the album won Favorite Soundtrack of the Year at the American Music Awards.

Professional ratings
Review scores
Source	Rating
About.com	4/5 stars
AllMusic	3/5 stars
Digital Spy	4/5 stars

== Sales and chart performance ==
The album debuted at number one on the American, Australian, Canadian, and Irish charts. It sold 136,000 copies in its first and 63,000 in its second week of release in the US, and saw the Glee cast beat the record previously set by The Beatles in 1966, for shortest span between first weeks at number one, just four weeks after they reached number one with the extended play Glee: The Music, The Power of Madonna. In Canada, 14,000 copies were sold in the first week of release, and 9,400 in the second. The album has been certified platinum in Australia and Ireland, and gold in the United States.

Each of the songs included on the album were released as singles, available for digital download. The best-performing were "Gives You Hell", charting at the top position in Ireland, "Total Eclipse of the Heart", which charted at number 9 in the United Kingdom and number 16 in the US, and "Jessie's Girl" at number eight in Australia and number ten in Canada. 134,000 copies of "Total Eclipse of the Heart" were purchased in the US in its first week of release, making it the series' second best sales week ever to that point, with only the début single "Don't Stop Believin'" registering bigger sales in its first week. "Jessie's Girl" has been certified gold in Australia, the first single to have reached this certification since "Don't Stop Believin'". Comparing the singles' chart positions with prior charted versions, Billboard noted that by reaching number 26, the Glee cast version of "Dream On" surpassed the original Aerosmith version, which peaked at number 59 in 1973 (but was re-released in 1976 and reached number 6). The cast's cover of "Physical" saw Olivia Newton-John make her first Hot 100 appearance since her remake of "I Honestly Love You" reached number 99 in 1998.

== Track listing ==
=== Standard edition ===
Unless otherwise indicated, Information is taken from Liner Notes

No.	Title	Writer(s)	Original artist(s)	Length
1.	"Hello, Goodbye" (featuring Amber Riley, Cory Monteith and Lea Michele)	John Lennon, Paul McCartney	The Beatles	3:29
2.	"Gives You Hell" (featuring Lea Michele)	Nick Wheeler, Tyson Ritter	The All-American Rejects	3:26
3.	"Hello" (Lea Michele featuring Jonathan Groff)	Lionel Richie	Lionel Richie	3:32
4.	"One Less Bell to Answer / A House Is Not a Home" (Matthew Morrison featuring Kristin Chenoweth)	Burt Bacharach, Hal David / Bacharach, David	The 5th Dimension / Dionne Warwick^{[A]}	4:42
5.	"Beautiful" (featuring Amber Riley)	Linda Perry	Christina Aguilera	3:59
6.	"Physical" (Jane Lynch featuring Olivia Newton-John)	Steve Kipner, Terry Shaddick	Olivia Newton-John	3:18
7.	"Total Eclipse Of The Heart" (Mark Salling, Lea Michele and Cory Monteith featuring Jonathan Groff)	Jim Steinman	Bonnie Tyler	4:24
8.	"Lady Is a Tramp" (featuring Mark Salling and Amber Riley)	Richard Rodgers, Lorenz Hart	Mitzi Green in the musical Babes in Arms	2:46
9.	"One" (featuring Lea Michele and Cory Monteith)	Bono, The Edge, Adam Clayton, Larry Mullen Jr.	U2	3:56
10.	"Dream On" (Matthew Morrison featuring Neil Patrick Harris)	Steven Tyler	Aerosmith	4:34
11.	"The Safety Dance" (featuring Kevin McHale)	Ivan Doroschuk	Men Without Hats	3:19
12.	"I Dreamed a Dream" (Lea Michele featuring Idina Menzel)	Claude-Michel Schönberg, Alain Boublil, Herbert Kretzmer, Jean-Marc Natel	Rose Laurens (French) and Patti LuPone (English) in the musical Les Misérables	3:08
13.	"Give Up the Funk" (featuring Chris Colfer and Amber Riley)	Jerome Brailey, George Clinton, William “Bootsy” Collins	Parliament	4:25
14.	"Bad Romance" (featuring Chris Colfer, Naya Rivera, Jenna Ushkowitz, Dianna Agron and Amber Riley)	Stefani Germanotta, Nadir Khayat	Lady Gaga	4:54

=== Deluxe edition ===
Unless otherwise indicated, Information is taken from Liner Notes

No.	Title	Writer(s)	Original artist(s)	Length
1.	"Hello, Goodbye" (featuring Amber Riley, Cory Monteith and Lea Michele)	John Lennon, Paul McCartney	The Beatles	3:29
2.	"Gives You Hell" (featuring Lea Michele)	Nick Wheeler, Tyson Ritter	The All-American Rejects	3:26
3.	"Hello" (Lea Michele featuring Jonathan Groff)	Lionel Richie	Lionel Richie	3:32
4.	"A House Is Not a Home" (featuring Chris Colfer and Cory Monteith)	Burt Bacharach, Hal David	Dionne Warwick	2:55
5.	"One Less Bell to Answer / A House Is Not a Home" (Matthew Morrison featuring Kristin Chenoweth)	Bacharach, David / Bacharach, David	The 5th Dimension / Dionne Warwick^{[A]}	4:42
6.	"Beautiful" (featuring Amber Riley)	Linda Perry	Christina Aguilera	3:59
7.	"Home" (featuring Kristin Chenoweth)	Charlie Smalls	Stephanie Mills in the musical The Wiz	3:31
8.	"Physical" (Jane Lynch featuring Olivia Newton-John)	Steve Kipner, Terry Shaddick	Olivia Newton-John	3:18
9.	"Total Eclipse Of The Heart" (Mark Salling, Lea Michele and Cory Monteith featuring Jonathan Groff)	Jim Steinman	Bonnie Tyler	4:24
10.	"Lady Is a Tramp" (featuring Mark Salling and Amber Riley)	Richard Rodgers, Lorenz Hart	Mitzi Green in the musical Babes in Arms	2:46
11.	"One" (featuring Lea Michele and Cory Monteith)	Bono, The Edge, Adam Clayton, Larry Mullen Jr.	U2	3:56
12.	"Rose's Turn" (featuring Chris Colfer)	Jule Styne, Stephen Sondheim	Ethel Merman in the musical Gypsy	2:00
13.	"Dream On" (Matthew Morrison featuring Neil Patrick Harris)	Steven Tyler	Aerosmith	4:34
14.	"The Safety Dance" (featuring Kevin McHale)	Ivan Doroschuk	Men Without Hats	3:19
15.	"I Dreamed a Dream" (Lea Michele featuring Idina Menzel)	Claude-Michel Schönberg, Alain Boublil, Herbert Kretzmer, Jean-Marc Natel	Rose Laurens (French) and Patti LuPone (English) in the musical Les Misérables	3:08
16.	"Loser" (featuring Mark Salling, Cory Monteith, Kent Avenido, Jessalyn Gilsig and Stephen Tobolowsky)	Beck Hansen, Carl Stephenson	Beck	3:47
17.	"Give Up the Funk" (featuring Chris Colfer and Amber Riley)	Jerome Brailey, George Clinton, William “Bootsy” Collins	Parliament	4:25
18.	"Beth" (featuring Mark Salling and Cory Monteith)	Peter Criscuola, Robert Ezrin, Paul Stanley, Stan Penridge	Kiss	2:37
19.	"Poker Face" (Lea Michele featuring Idina Menzel)	Stefani Germanotta, Nadir Khayat	Lady Gaga	3:39
20.	"Bad Romance" (featuring Chris Colfer, Naya Rivera, Jenna Ushkowitz, Dianna Agron and Amber Riley)	Germanotta, Khayat	Lady Gaga	4:54

Japanese bonus tracks
No.	Title	Writer(s)	Original artist(s)	Length
21.	"Shout It Out Loud"	Paul Stanley, Gene Simmons, Bob Ezrin	Kiss	2:49
22.	"Tell Me Something Good"	Stevie Wonder	Rufus and Chaka Khan	3:15

Notes

- A While track 5 (track 4 on the standard edition) is a mash-up of songs by The 5th Dimension (earlier recorded by Keely Smith) and Dionne Warwick (also recorded by Brook Benton and various other artists) respectively, the medley version was originally performed by Barbra Streisand on her 1971 album Barbra Joan Streisand.

== Personnel ==
Vocals (main cast)

- Dianna Agron
- Kent Avenido
- Chris Colfer
- Jessalyn Gilsig
- Jane Lynch
- Jayma Mays (Credit only)
- Kevin McHale
- Lea Michele
- Cory Monteith
- Matthew Morrison
- Amber Riley
- Naya Rivera
- Mark Salling
- Stephen Tobolowsky
- Jenna Ushkowitz

Guest vocals

- Jonathan Groff
- Olivia Newton-John
- Kristin Chenoweth
- Idina Menzel
- Neil Patrick Harris

Additional Vocals

- Adam Anders
- Nikki Anders
- Kala Balch
- David Baloche
- Colin Benward
- Ravaughn Brown
- Kamari Copeland
- Tim Davis
- Emily Gomez
- Storm Lee
- David Loucks
- Chris Mann
- Chaz Mason
- Jeanette Olsen
- Zac Poor
- Jimmy Andrew Richard
- Shelley Scarr
- Drew Ryan Scott
- Onitsha Shaw
- Windy Wagner

Executive Producers

- Dante Di Loreto
- Brad Falchuk

Producers

- Adam Anders
- Peer Astrom
- Ryan Murphy

Engineers

- Adam Anders
- Peer Astrom
- Ryan Petersen

Soundtrack Producers

- Adam Anders
- Ryan Murphy

Art Direction, Design

- Dave Bett
- Maria Paula Marulanda

Coordination

- Heather Guibert
- Robin Koehler
- Meaghan Lyons

Mastering

- Dominick Maita

Mixing

- Peer Astrom

Music Supervisor

- PJ Bloom

Executive in Charge of Music

- Geoff Bywater

== Charts and certifications ==
=== Weekly charts ===
Chart (2010)	Peak position
Australian Albums (ARIA)	1
Canadian Albums (Billboard)	1
Irish Albums (IRMA)	1
Mexican Albums (AMPROFON)	9
New Zealand Albums (RMNZ)	3
UK Albums (Official Charts)	3
US Billboard 200	1
US Soundtrack Albums (Billboard)	1

Chart (2011)	Peak position
Austrian Albums (Ö3 Austria)	49
Belgian Albums (Ultratop Flanders)	73
Belgian Albums (Ultratop Wallonia)	50
Dutch Albums (Album Top 100)	22
French Albums (SNEP)	47
Swiss Albums (Schweizer Hitparade)	87

=== Year-end charts ===
Chart (2010)	Position
Australian Albums (ARIA)	29
Canadian Albums (Billboard)	42
Mexican Albums (AMPROFON)	66
UK Albums (OCC)	75
US Billboard 200	49
US Soundtrack Albums (Billboard)	6

=== Certifications ===
Country	Provider	Certification (sales thresholds)
Australia	ARIA	Platinum
Ireland	IRMA	Platinum
New Zealand	RIANZ	Gold
United Kingdom	BPI	Gold
United States	RIAA	Gold

== Release history ==
Region	Release date	Edition(s)
Canada	May 18, 2010	Standard, Deluxe
United States	May 18, 2010	Standard, Deluxe
Australia	May 21, 2010	Deluxe
Ireland	May 21, 2010	Deluxe
New Zealand	May 21, 2010	Deluxe
United Kingdom	May 24, 2010	Deluxe
Japan	May 28, 2010	Standard
Japan	June 4, 2010	Deluxe
Hong Kong	June 21, 2010	Deluxe
Taiwan	June 29, 2010	Deluxe
Brazil	August 18, 2010	Standard, Deluxe
Italy	October 4, 2011	Standard
