= Vitamin D (Glee) =

- Glee episode
- Episode no.: Season 1 Episode 6
- Directed by: Elodie Keene
- Written by: Ryan Murphy
- Production code: 1ARC05
- Original air date: October 7, 2009

Guest appearances
- Patrick Gallagher as Ken Tanaka; Iqbal Theba as Principal Figgins; Naya Rivera as Santana Lopez; Heather Morris as Brittany Pierce; Harry Shum, Jr. as Mike Chang; Dijon Talton as Matt Rutherford; Kent Avenido as Howard Bamboo; Joe Hursley as Joe

Episode chronology
← Previous "The Rhodes Not Taken"	Next → "Throwdown"
- Glee season 1

"Vitamin D" is the sixth episode of the American television series Glee. The episode premiered on the Fox network on October 7, 2009. It was written by series creator Ryan Murphy and directed by Elodie Keene. In the episode, glee club director Will Schuester (Matthew Morrison) pits the male and female club members against each other for a mash-up competition. Will's wife Terri (Jessalyn Gilsig) takes a job as the school nurse to stop him becoming closer to guidance counsellor Emma Pillsbury (Jayma Mays), and starts giving the students performance-enhancing pseudoephedrine tablets.

The episode features mash-up covers of "It's My Life" by Bon Jovi and "Confessions Part II" by Usher, and "Halo" by Beyoncé Knowles and "Walking on Sunshine" by Katrina and the Waves. Both tracks were released as singles, available for digital download. "Vitamin D" was watched by 7.30 million US viewers, and received generally positive reviews from critics. Performances by Morrison, Mays and Jane Lynch as cheerleading coach Sue Sylvester attracted praise, as did the staging of the musical mash-ups. However, Aly Semigran of MTV and Mandi Bierly of Entertainment Weekly both noted critically that dramatic storylines in the episode dominated over the musical performances.

== Plot ==
Believing the glee club members are becoming complacent ahead of the forthcoming sectionals, director Will Schuester (Matthew Morrison) divides the club into boys against girls for a mash-up competition. Cheerleading coach Sue Sylvester (Jane Lynch) observes that head cheerleader Quinn Fabray's (Dianna Agron) performance standards are slipping. When Quinn blames her tiredness on her glee club participation, Sue renews her resolve to destroy the club, planning to sabotage Will's personal life.

Sue tells Will's wife Terri Schuester (Jessalyn Gilsig) that guidance counselor Emma Pillsbury (Jayma Mays) has romantic feelings for Will. Determined to stay close to her husband, Terri takes a job as the school nurse, despite having no medical qualifications. She encourages Emma's boyfriend, football coach Ken Tanaka (Patrick Gallagher) to propose to her, which he does. After asking Will if there is any reason she should not marry Ken, and being warned off Will by Terri, Emma accepts his proposal. Terri is still hiding the fact she experienced a hysterical pregnancy from Will, and upon realizing how much her life is changing due to her pregnancy, Quinn agrees to let Terri secretly adopt her baby.

Finn Hudson (Cory Monteith) is exhausted by his extra-curricular activities, so Terri gives him pseudoephedrine tablets, which Finn shares with the rest of the males in the glee club. The effects of the tablets enhance their performance, and they give an energetic mash-up of "It's My Life" and "Confessions Part II". When Kurt Hummel (Chris Colfer) tells the girls the secret behind the boys' performance, they, too, request the tablets from Terri, and give a high-spirited mash-up of "Halo" and "Walking On Sunshine". Finn and Rachel Berry (Lea Michele) feel guilty for cheating, however, and agree to nullify the competition. When Principal Figgins (Iqbal Theba) learns what has happened, he fires Terri and, angry with Will, appoints Sue as co-director of the glee club.

== Production ==
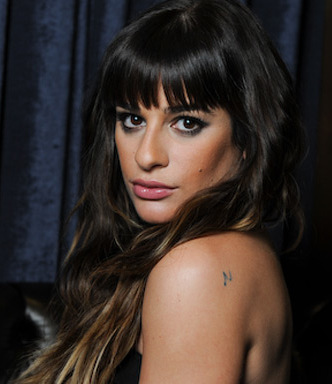
Before filming "Vitamin D", Michele practiced speaking "manically" for several days in order to convey the effects of pseudoephedrine on Rachel.

Recurring characters who appear in "Vitamin D" are glee club members Santana Lopez (Naya Rivera), Brittany Pierce (Heather Morris), Mike Chang (Harry Shum, Jr.) and Matt Rutherford (Dijon Talton), former glee club director Sandy Ryerson (Stephen Tobolowsky), Principal Figgins (Theba), football coach Ken Tanaka (Gallagher), Terri's co-worker Howard Bamboo (Kent Avenido), and local news anchors Rod Remington (Bill A. Jones) and Andrea Carmichael (Earlene Davis). Joe Hursley guest stars as Joe.

The episode features mash-up covers of "It's My Life" by Bon Jovi and "Confessions Part II" by Usher, and "Halo" by Beyoncé Knowles and "Walking on Sunshine" by Katrina and the Waves. Both tracks were released as singles, available for digital download. "It's My Life / Confessions Part II" charted at number 7 in Ireland, 14 in the UK, 22 in Australia, 25 in Canada and 30 in America, while "Halo / Walking on Sunshine" charted at number 4 in Ireland, 9 in the UK, 10 in Australia, 28 in Canada and 40 in America. Michele revealed that she practiced talking "manically" for several days in order to convey the effects of pseudoephedrine on Rachel. In order to portray the character in her altered state, she questioned: "How manic is the right amount of manic? What would Rachel be like on uppers? What would she sound like?" She deemed performing the mash-up piece in that state "so much fun".

== Reception ==
The episode was watched by 7.30 million U.S. viewers and attained a 3.2/8 rating/share in the 18–49 demographic. Glee maintained its ratings from the previous week, despite all of the other new Wednesday night shows of the season declining by double-digit percentages. It was the eighteenth most watched show in Canada for the week of broadcast, with 1.61 million viewers. In the UK, the episode was watched by 2.008 million viewers (1.608 million on E4, and 400,000 on E4+1), becoming the most-watched show on E4 and E4 +1 for the week, and the most-watched show on cable for the week, as well as the most-watched episode of the series at the time.

"Vitamin D" was nominated for the best "Comedy Series Episode" award at the 2010 PRISM Awards. It received generally positive reviews from critics. Shawna Malcom of the Los Angeles Times noted that she preferred the boys' performance to the girls', commenting: "Their number had the same heart-soaring power as "Don't Stop Believin'" [performed in the pilot episode]." Malcom enjoyed Sue's character development in the episode, claiming that, "In less skilled hands, there’s no doubt Sue would be an over-the-top disaster. But thanks to the incomparable Jane Lynch, I can’t wait to see what trouble the character stirs up next." Aly Semigran of MTV also enjoyed the boys' performance more than the girls', and gave the episode a mostly positive review, writing that it moved the series' storylines to "a whole new level". She felt, however, that the episode "didn't have nearly enough singing". Mandi Bierly for Entertainment Weekly similarly noted that: "So much happened in this hour that the musical numbers, though enjoyable, were almost an afterthought." Bierly favoured the girls' performance, and praised Morrison's acting, commenting: "Matthew Morrison communicates so much with his eyes. There’s a softness and a longing in them that I’m always surprised Emma (Jayma Mays) matches."

Mike Hale for the New York Times praised Mays' performance, noting: "Jayma Mays registered Emma’s devastation with just the slightest widening of those enormous eyes. In fact all the best non-singing moments in the episode were hers." Hale was less impressed with the rest of the episode, deeming the pregnancy storyline "so boring that it hardly mattered". He noted that: "For many viewers, the best moments in the episode probably came very early on and involved Jane Lynch’s Sue Sylvester, who still got all the best lines." Anna Pickard of The Guardian called the pseudoephedrine storyline "relentlessly silly [...] but joyfully so", preferring the boys' performance to the girls' as "some excellent comedy helped me forget about Finn's dodgy autotuned vocals for once".
