= Glee season 1 =

2009–10 season of American musical comedy-drama

Glee
- Season 1
- Promotional poster and home media cover art
- Starring: Dianna Agron; Chris Colfer; Jessalyn Gilsig; Jane Lynch; Jayma Mays; Kevin McHale; Lea Michele; Cory Monteith; Matthew Morrison; Amber Riley; Mark Salling; Jenna Ushkowitz
- No. of episodes: 22

Release
- Original network: Fox
- Original release: May 19, 2009 – June 8, 2010

Season chronology
- Next → Season 2

The first season of the musical comedy-drama television series Glee originally aired on Fox in the United States. The pilot episode was broadcast as an advanced preview of the series on May 19, 2009, with the remainder of the season airing between September 9, 2009, and June 8, 2010. The season consisted of 22 episodes; the first 13 aired on Wednesdays at 9 pm (ET) and the final 9 aired on Tuesdays at 9 pm (ET). The season was executive produced by Ryan Murphy, Brad Falchuk, and Dante Di Loreto; Murphy's production company helped co-produce the series alongside 20th Century Fox.

The season features the fictional high school show choir New Directions competing for the first time on the show choir circuit, while its members and faculty deal with sex, bullying, body image, homosexuality, teenage pregnancy, disabilities, adoption and other social issues. The central characters are glee club director Will Schuester (Matthew Morrison), cheerleading coach Sue Sylvester (Jane Lynch), Will's former wife Terri (Jessalyn Gilsig), guidance counselor Emma Pillsbury (Jayma Mays), and glee club members Rachel (Lea Michele), Finn (Cory Monteith), Artie (Kevin McHale), Kurt (Chris Colfer), Mercedes (Amber Riley), Tina (Jenna Ushkowitz), Puck (Mark Salling), and Quinn (Dianna Agron).

The season received generally positive reviews from critics. The musical scores used throughout the first season proved to be a commercial success, with over seven million copies of Glee cast single releases purchased digitally. In 2009, the Glee remake of "Don't Stop Believin'" became their first hit, and other covers quickly gained similar worldwide popularity, while the albums topped the charts in Ireland and other countries. The season was nominated for 19 Emmy Awards, four Golden Globe Awards, six Satellite Awards and 57 other awards. It was accompanied by four DVD releases: Glee – Pilot Episode: Director's Cut, Glee – Season 1, Volume 1: Road to Sectionals featuring episodes one to thirteen, Glee – Season 1, Volume 2: Road to Regionals featuring episodes fourteen to twenty-two, and Glee – The Complete First Season.

== Production ==
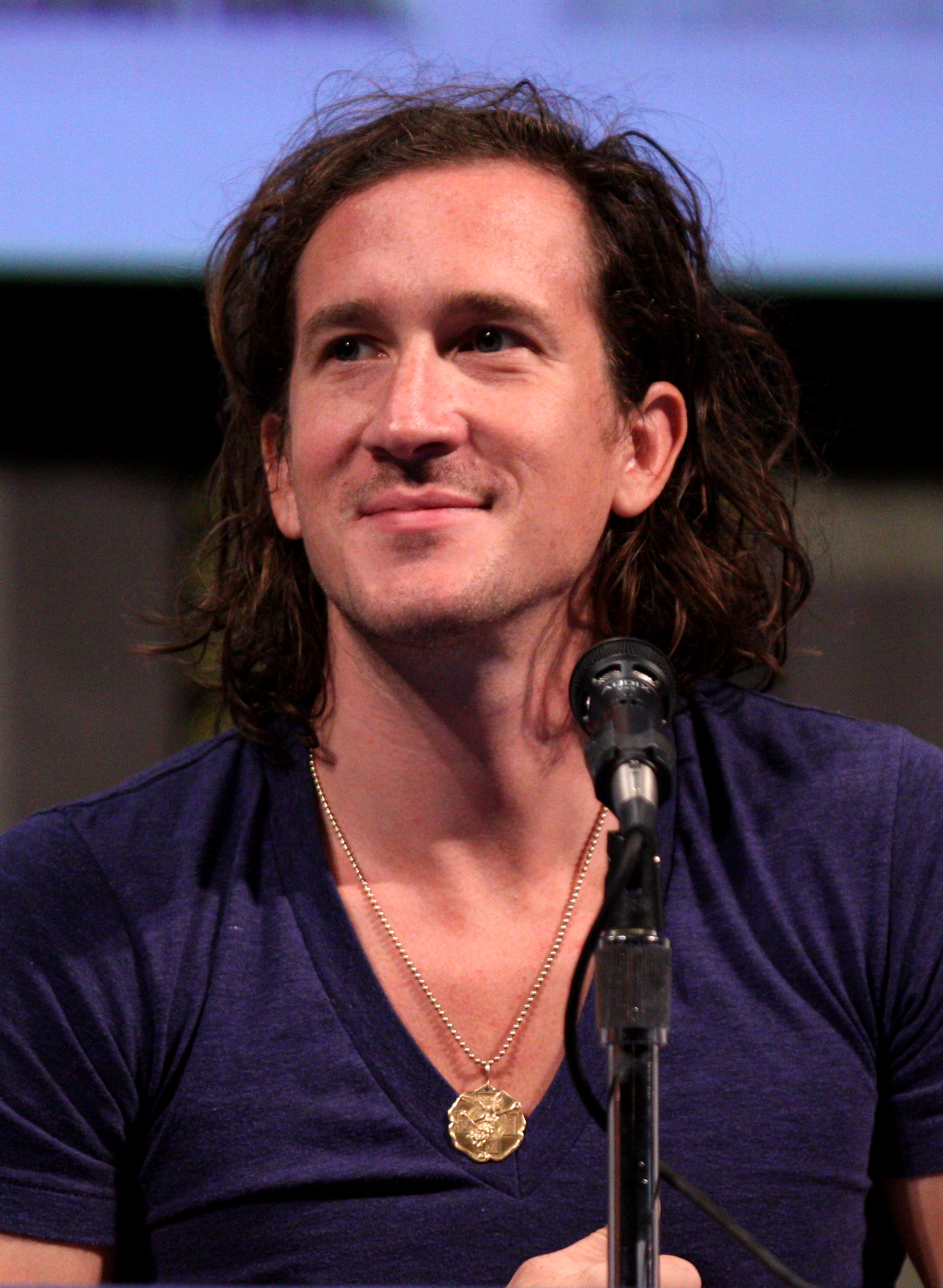
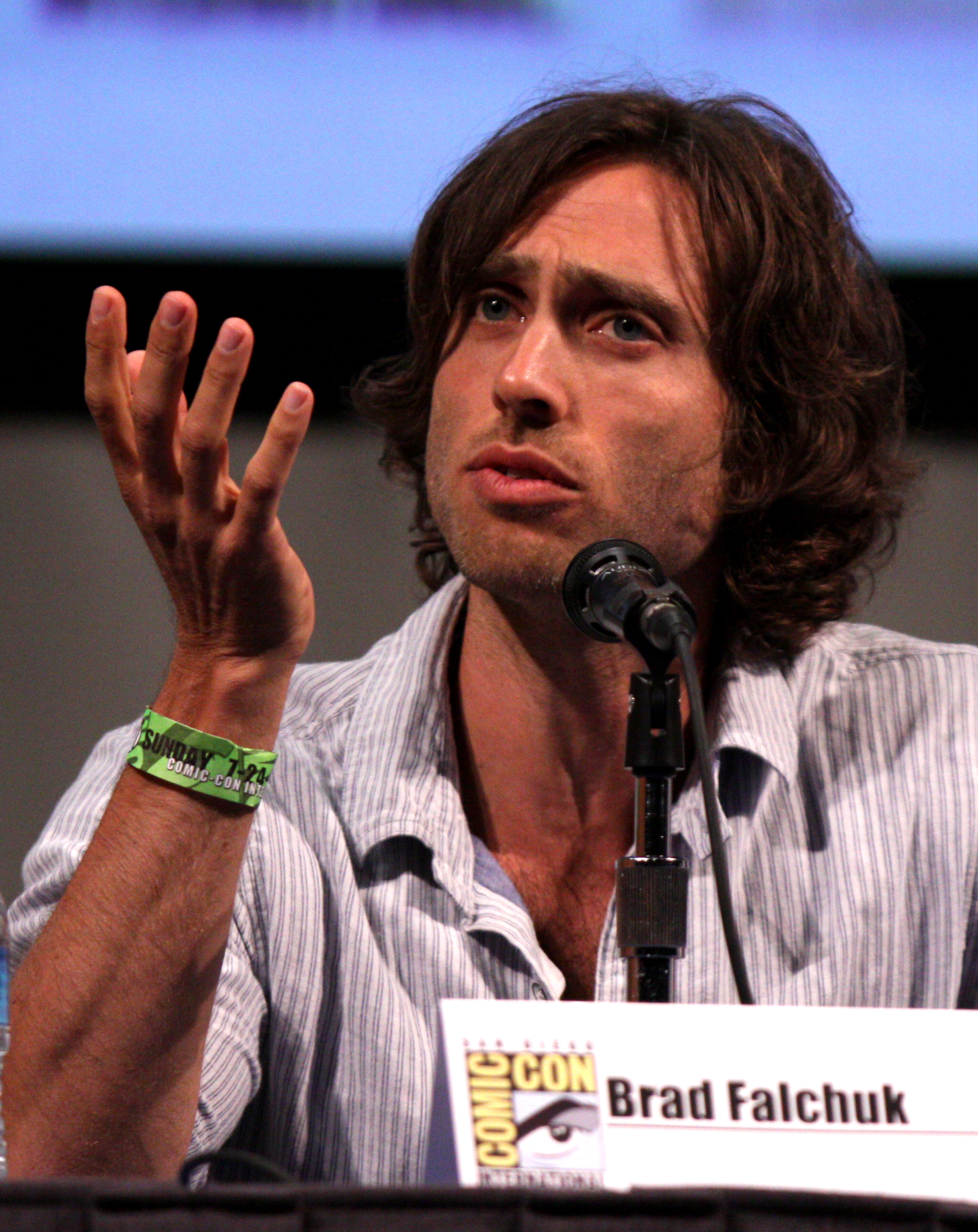
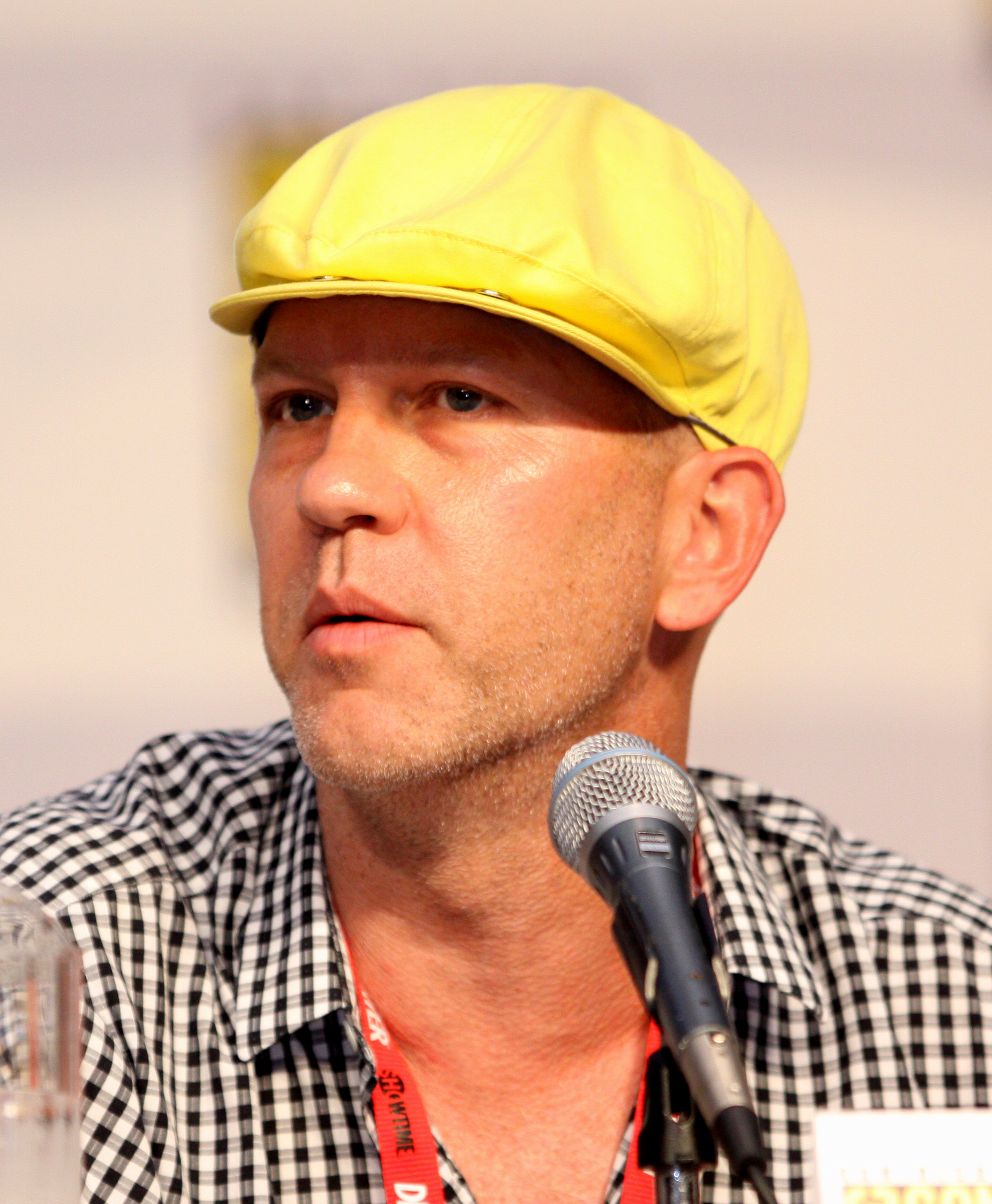
Glee co-creators Ian Brennan (left), Brad Falchuk (center) and Ryan Murphy (right)

The season was produced by 20th Century Fox Television and Ryan Murphy Television, and was aired on Fox in the US. The executive producers were Dante Di Loreto and series creators Ryan Murphy and Brad Falchuk, with John Peter Kousas and creator Ian Brennan acting as co-executive producers. The first two episodes were co-written by Murphy, Falchuk and Brennan; all other episodes were written by them individually. Murphy and Falchuk also directed several episodes, while other episodes were directed by Elodie Keene, John Scott, Paris Barclay, Bill D'Elia and Alfonso Gomez-Rejon. Joss Whedon guest-directed the episode "Dream On". The pilot episode was broadcast as a preview of the season on May 19, 2009. The series returned on September 9, 2009, and after three episodes, Fox picked Glee up for a full season on September 21, 2009. The initial run of thirteen episodes aired until December 9, 2009, with the series then taking a mid-season break until April 13, 2010. After airing on Wednesdays at 9 pm (ET), the first season moved to Tuesdays in the same timeslot for the final nine episodes. The commissioning of a second season was announced on January 11, 2010, with the production of a third season announced on May 23, 2010.

The series features numerous musical cover versions performed on-screen by the characters. At the beginning of the season, Murphy intended for the performances to remain reality-based, as opposed to having the characters spontaneously burst into song. As the season progressed, however, Glee began to utilize fantasy sequences, with paraplegic character Artie imagining himself dancing to "The Safety Dance", and six separate characters performing a fantasy version of "Like a Virgin". The first thirteen episodes of the season averaged five songs per episode. For the final nine episodes, the number of performances increased to eight. Murphy believes that many of the songs were "really fun and successful", however the production team intend to return to five songs per episode for Glee's second season, in order to return focus to the characters.

When seeking to attain the rights to songs, early in the season Murphy was often requested to send out advanced scripts, but refused, not wanting to set a precedent for record labels having creative involvement in the show. Singer Rihanna offered her single "Take a Bow" for use at a reduced licensing rate. Madonna granted the show rights to her entire catalogue, and the tribute episode "The Power of Madonna" features Madonna performances exclusively.

In total, five soundtracks were released to accompany the first season. Three albums released over the course of the season (Glee: The Music, Volume 1, Glee: The Music, Volume 2, and Glee: The Music, Volume 3 Showstoppers) compiled various songs throughout the series, while two EPs (Glee: The Music, The Power of Madonna and Glee: The Music, Journey to Regionals) were released on the same day as the respective episodes aired. Journey to Regionals did not release any official singles, while the remaining four albums were fully released as singles. Following the completion of the season, the Glee cast performed a 13-date concert tour in North America, Glee Live! In Concert! By its conclusion, tickets for all 13 performances had sold out, grossing $5,031,438.

== Episodes ==
No. overall	No. in season	Title	Directed by	Written by	Original release date	Prod. code	US viewers (millions)
1	1	"Pilot"	Ryan Murphy	Ryan Murphy & Brad Falchuk & Ian Brennan	May 19, 2009 (Note: An extended director's cut of the pilot was broadcast on September 2, 2009 as a lead-in to the series premiere. On its broadcast, the extended episode attracted 4.2 million viewers.)	1ARC79	9.62
Former glee club star Will Schuester takes over McKinley High School's glee club in the hopes of restoring it to its former glory. He is faced with the challenge of converting a group of misfits, including fame-hungry Rachel Berry, powerhouse vocalist Mercedes Jones, flamboyant Kurt Hummel, shy Tina Cohen-Chang, and paraplegic Artie Abrams into a team of singers. When Will discovers the football quarterback Finn Hudson has a secret talent for singing, he blackmails Finn into joining the club. His friendship with colleague Ken Tanaka, the football coach, suffers when Ken discovers his crush, school guidance counselor Emma Pillsbury, has a crush on Will. Meanwhile, Will's wife Terri tells Will she is pregnant and pushes him to find a higher paying job to support his family. Will considers quitting his job and commitment to the glee club, but overhears New Directions performing "Don't Stop Believin'" so well he ends up returning, concluding he could not bear to see them win Nationals without him.
2	2	"Showmance"	Ryan Murphy	Ryan Murphy & Brad Falchuk & Ian Brennan	September 9, 2009	1ARC01	7.50
The glee club must perform in front of the school for the first time in an attempt to recruit new members. The group is opposed to Will's choice of song and instead perform a provocative rendition of Salt-N-Pepa's "Push It" behind Will's back. The performance is well received by the student body, but complaints from parents lead Principal Figgins to reprimand Will. Will takes a second job as a janitor and grows closer to Emma, who decides to respect that he is married and instead accepts a date with Ken. Terri discovers she is having a hysterical pregnancy, but hides the truth from Will, telling him they are having a son. Cheerleaders Santana, Brittany, and Finn's girlfriend Quinn join New Directions, recruited by coach Sue Sylvester to help bring down the club. Rachel and Finn kiss while rehearsing, but Finn chooses to return to Quinn.
3	3	"Acafellas"	John Scott	Ryan Murphy	September 16, 2009	1ARC02	6.69
Will forms an all-male a cappella group called the "Acafellas", neglecting the glee club in favor of dedicating his time to the new endeavor. After two of the Acafella members quit, Finn and his best friend Puck join. The group records an album and performs at the school PTA meeting in front of celebrity guest Josh Groban, but Will ultimately recommits to New Directions, realizing his passion is in teaching. In his absence, the club members struggle with choreography, and resist attempts at sabotage by members of the cheer squad. They briefly hire well-known choreographer Dakota Stanley, but fire him when he belittles their appearances and abilities. Mercedes harbors romantic feelings for Kurt, and is hurt when he misleads her into believing he has feelings for Rachel. Kurt later comes out as gay to Mercedes—the first time he has said it to anyone.
4	4	"Preggers"	Brad Falchuk	Brad Falchuk	September 23, 2009	1ARC03	6.63
Kurt joins the football team and admits his homosexuality to his father, Burt, who accepts him for who he is. Quinn discovers she is pregnant and tells Finn the baby is his, when the father is actually Puck. After learning of Quinn's pregnancy from Will, Terri confronts Quinn and asks questions about her prenatal care. Finn asks Will to teach the football team to dance, hoping to improve their performance and thus his chance of receiving a football scholarship. Puck, Mike Chang, and Matt Rutherford all join the glee club after the football team's win dancing to "Single Ladies (Put a Ring on It)". This makes them a group of twelve and eligible to compete, but Sue and former glee club director Sandy Ryerson team up in an effort to bring the club down, luring away a disillusioned Rachel, who quits when Will awards a solo she wanted to Tina.
5	5	"The Rhodes Not Taken"	John Scott	Ian Brennan	September 30, 2009	1ARC04	7.40
Will, trying to find a twelfth member in the wake of Rachel's defection to the school musical, recruits former glee club star April Rhodes, who never graduated high school. After being advised by Emma to utilize his musical talent, Finn flirts with Rachel continuously in an attempt to convince her to return, hoping having her in the club will increase his chances of gaining a music scholarship. While Finn takes Rachel bowling, they kiss briefly after Rachel bowls a strike. Although Rachel is angry when she discovers Quinn is pregnant, she ultimately rejoins the club. Will confesses to once having had a crush on April, and encourages her to sober up and pursue her dreams of performing on Broadway. The glee club performs at Invitationals, launching themselves onto the show choir competition circuit.
6	6	"Vitamin D"	Elodie Keene	Ryan Murphy	October 7, 2009	1ARC05	7.28
Believing the glee club members are becoming complacent ahead of Sectionals, Will pits the girls against the boys for a mash-up competition. Sue renews her resolve to destroy the glee club, and she tells Terri that Emma has romantic feelings for Will. Determined to stay close to her husband, Terri takes a job as the school nurse despite having no medical qualifications. With encouragement from Terri, Ken proposes to Emma, who reluctantly accepts. Terri also gives the glee club pseudoephedrine tablets to enhance their mash-up performances. Rachel and Finn feel guilty and confess, resulting in the competition being nullified, Terri being fired, and Sue being appointed co-director of the glee club. Realizing how much her life is changing due to her pregnancy, Quinn agrees to let Terri secretly adopt her baby, enabling Terri to continue faking her pregnancy.
7	7	"Throwdown"	Ryan Murphy	Brad Falchuk	October 14, 2009	1ARC06	7.65
Will and Sue clash over the running of the glee club; Sue tries to tear the club apart by turning the students against each other, suggesting Will has been neglecting the needs of the minority students. Will retaliates by failing all of Sue's cheerleaders in Spanish class. When school reporter Jacob Ben Israel learns Quinn is pregnant, Rachel attempts to keep him from breaking the news to the rest of the school, but Sue forces him to run the story. The glee club members stage a walkout over Will and Sue's incessant arguing, and rally to support Quinn when the rest of the school learns of her pregnancy. Sue ultimately steps down as co-director. Meanwhile, Terri blackmails her obstetrician into faking a sonogram using Quinn's ultrasound DVD, reinforcing her deception to Will that she is still pregnant.
8	8	"Mash-Up"	Elodie Keene	Ian Brennan	October 21, 2009	1ARC07	7.15
Will attempts to create a mash-up wedding song for Emma and Ken. Ken becomes increasingly jealous of Emma's feelings for Will and tries to force the football-playing New Directions members to quit the glee club, but ultimately relents. Realizing that he has strong feelings for Emma, Will tells Emma and Ken that he will not be able to create their mash-up. Finn and Quinn find they are no longer considered popular by the rest of the student body. Rachel and Puck date briefly, but break up as they have feelings for Finn and Quinn respectively. Sue has a brief romance with local news anchor Rod Remington and temporarily makes amends with Will, until she discovers Rod is cheating on her. Returning to form, Sue removes Quinn from the cheerleading squad because of her pregnancy.
9	9	"Wheels"	Paris Barclay	Ryan Murphy	November 11, 2009	1ARC08	7.35
The glee club holds a bake sale to raise money for a wheelchair-accessible bus so Artie can travel with them to Sectionals. Quinn struggles with the medical expenses incurred by her pregnancy and threatens to break up with Finn if he cannot pay her ultrasound bill. Sue accepts a student with Down syndrome onto the cheerleading squad and pays the school to build new wheelchair ramps, leading Will to question her motives. It is revealed Sue has an older sister who has Down syndrome. Kurt and Rachel compete for a solo performance, but Kurt sabotages his own performance when his father receives harassing phone calls about his sexuality. Artie and Tina go on a date and share a kiss, but Artie feels betrayed when Tina admits she has been faking her own disability, a speech impediment, since sixth grade.
10	10	"Ballad"	Brad Falchuk	Brad Falchuk	November 18, 2009	1ARC09	7.36
The glee club members are split into pairs to sing ballads to one another. Rachel is paired with Will and develops a crush on him. Will struggles to let Rachel down gently, recalling the last student he turned down almost died after eating the world's hottest pepper in her grief. Rachel realizes her feelings for Will reflect her concerns about her own self-worth and apologizes for her behavior. Kurt advises Finn to sing his ballad to his unborn daughter; Finn's mother, Carole, deduces that Quinn is pregnant after finding Finn singing to a sonogram video. Quinn is disowned and evicted from the family home by her father after he learns she is pregnant, leading her to move in with Finn and his mother. Puck reveals to Mercedes he is the father of Quinn's baby, and Mercedes advises him to leave Quinn alone.
11	11	"Hairography"	Bill D'Elia	Ian Brennan	November 25, 2009	1ARC10	6.08
New Directions meets their Sectionals competition – Jane Addams Girls Choir for girls recently released from juvenile detention, and the Haverbrook Deaf Choir. Sue gives the New Directions' set list for Sectionals to the competing clubs in order to damage the glee club's chance of progressing to Regionals. Kurt gives Rachel a bad makeover, trying to sabotage her attempts at attracting Finn. Quinn reconsiders having her baby adopted, giving Puck a chance to prove he would be a good father. They successfully baby-sit for Terri's triplet nephews together, but Quinn later learns Puck spent the evening sexting Santana. She recommits to the idea of adoption, believing her daughter deserves a better father.
12	12	"Mattress"	Elodie Keene	Ryan Murphy	December 2, 2009	1ARC11	8.15
Will is dismayed to learn that Emma and Ken have scheduled their wedding for the same day as Sectionals. When the glee club is left out of the school yearbook, Rachel has the club members cast in a local mattress commercial in an attempt to raise their social status. After discovering a pregnancy pad in Terri's drawer, Will confronts Terri and discovers that she has been lying to him for months about her supposed pregnancy. He angrily walks out on her and spends the night at the school, sleeping on one of the mattresses given to the glee club in payment for their commercial. Sue informs Will and Figgins that the club receiving payment for the commercial revokes their amateur status, rendering them ineligible to compete at Sectionals. As he was the only one who accepted payment, Will steps down as club director so the team remains eligible to compete without his involvement.
13	13	"Sectionals"	Brad Falchuk	Brad Falchuk	December 9, 2009	1ARC12	8.13
Most of the glee club has learned that Puck is the father of Quinn's baby, but they hide the fact from Rachel, believing that she will tell Finn. Rachel nevertheless deduces Puck is the father of Quinn's baby and expresses her concerns to Finn, who confronts Puck. After Quinn tearfully admits the truth, Finn quits the glee club. Emma postpones her wedding to accompany the New Directions to Sectionals, during which the team discovers Sue's sabotage attempt when their rivals perform the songs from their setlist. Aided by Finn's return, the team puts new routines together at the last moment. They win by unanimous decision and advance on to Regionals. Sue vows revenge when she is suspended by Figgins over her attempts to sabotage the club. Ken breaks up with Emma over her feelings for Will, who leaves Terri and shares a kiss with Emma; both are happy, but uncertain of what will happen next.
14	14	"Hell-O"	Brad Falchuk	Ian Brennan	April 13, 2010	1ARC13	13.66
Sue blackmails Figgins and returns to the school following her suspension. She enlists Santana and Brittany to seduce Finn to destroy his new relationship with Rachel. Finn breaks up with Rachel, who becomes enamoured with Jesse St. James, the lead singer of New Directions' rival, Vocal Adrenaline. The glee club concludes that Jesse is using Rachel, and threaten to expel her from the club unless she breaks up with him; Rachel later asks Jesse to keep their relationship a secret. Will and Emma attempt to begin dating, but Emma is uncomfortable kissing Will due to her mysophobia, leading Will to make out with Vocal Adrenaline's coach, Shelby Corcoran. Shelby advises Will to take some time out for himself, as he has immediately moved on to a new relationship after leaving Terri. Will and Emma ultimately decide to put their relationship on hold to deal with their separate issues.
15	15	"The Power of Madonna"	Ryan Murphy	Ryan Murphy	April 20, 2010	1ARC14	12.98
Inspired by the Cheerios and Sue paying homage to Madonna, Will looks to the musical icon to address the boys' recent misogynistic behavior. Inspired by Madonna's example, Emma tells Will that she intends to lose her virginity to him that evening. Elsewhere, Santana offers to take Finn's virginity, while Rachel and Jesse also propose to have sex. Emma and Rachel ultimately decide not to go through with it, but Finn decides to have sex with Santana, keeping it a secret from Rachel. Jesse transfers to McKinley High and joins New Directions, despite the protest of Finn and others. In an attempt to get more opportunities to shine, Kurt and Mercedes join the Cheerios, and help Sue produce a music video for "Vogue" as a school project which helps Sue become more comfortable with herself.
16	16	"Home"	Paris Barclay	Brad Falchuk	April 27, 2010	1ARC15	12.18
Kurt fixes up his father on a date with Carole in hopes of having a regular family and get closer to Finn. His plan backfires when his father bonds with Finn over sports, leaving Kurt feeling excluded. Will rents out April Rhodes's roller rink for New Directions as a temporary practice space. Will helps April sort out her life once more, culminating in April becoming a millionaire and buying the school auditorium for the glee club. Mercedes deals with weight issues after Sue tells her to lose ten pounds for an upcoming Cheerios interview. After fainting in the cafeteria from extreme dieting, Mercedes is comforted by Quinn, who advises her to feel comfortable with who she is. At the school's pep rally, Mercedes abandons the planned routine and instead sings "Beautiful", impressing the interviewer.
17	17	"Bad Reputation"	Elodie Keene	Ian Brennan	May 4, 2010	1ARC16	11.62
When the "Glist" – a salacious list about the sexual exploits of the glee club members – circulates the halls of McKinley High, Will begins an investigation. He discovers Quinn to be the culprit, motivated by her distress at her loss of social status as a result of her pregnancy, but does not turn her in to Principal Figgins. Kurt, Mercedes, Artie, Tina and Brittany misbehave in an attempt to gain bad reputations, but their plans repeatedly backfire on them. Sue is mortified when a video of her rendition of Olivia Newton-John's classic "Physical" is unearthed. In an effort to end the ridicule of her colleagues, Sue tells Emma that Will has been unfaithful to her, leading Emma to publicly shame Will in the teachers' lounge. Sue ends up being contacted by Newton-John herself to produce a new music video of the song.
18	18	"Laryngitis"	Alfonso Gomez-Rejon	Ryan Murphy	May 11, 2010	1ARC17	11.57
Will discovers that some glee club members are faking their singing, and he assigns each club member to perform a song that best represents their feelings. Rachel panics when a sore throat affects her singing. Finn helps her to get perspective on her condition by introducing her to his friend Sean, who was paralyzed from the upper chest down during a football game. Jealous of the time Burt is spending with Finn, Kurt tries to emulate his father's masculine persona, dressing in outdoorsman gear and attempting to have a fling with Brittany. Burt reassures Kurt that he loves him for who he is. Puck dates Mercedes in a strategic move to elevate his social status, but ends up testing Mercedes' emotions in the process, causing her to break up with him and resign from the cheer squad.
19	19	"Dream On"	Joss Whedon	Brad Falchuk	May 18, 2010	1ARC18	11.47
Will's high school nemesis, Bryan Ryan, causes trouble for the glee club, announcing his intent to cut them from the district budget. He and Will compete for a role in a local production of Les Misérables, and when Will is awarded the lead role, he gives it to Bryan to save the club. Tina gives Artie false hope that he may one day walk again, temporarily straining their relationship. With guidance from Emma, Artie begins to accept his physical condition. Rachel confides in Jesse of her lifelong dream to meet her biological mother. Jesse later meets with Shelby, who reveals herself as Rachel's biological mother, but a contractual agreement with Rachel's two fathers prevents her from meeting with her.
20	20	"Theatricality"	Ryan Murphy	Ryan Murphy	May 25, 2010	1ARC20	11.37
Will teaches the club about theatricality to help Tina through an identity crisis, leading the glee club to tribute to Lady Gaga, donning some of her famous outfits. While sneaking in on a Vocal Adrenaline practice session, Rachel realizes that Shelby is her biological mother. Neither feel an immediate mother–daughter bond; Shelby tells Rachel they should just be grateful that they have met, and the two mutually decide to maintain their distance. Burt invites Finn and Carole to move in, but Finn is reluctant to share a room with Kurt. Finn loses his temper and uses a homophobic slur against Kurt, which Burt overhears; Burt angrily tells off Finn and dismisses him from the house, even if it costs Burt his relationship with Carole. Finn and Kurt later reconcile when Finn and the glee club comes to Kurt's defense against the school bullies.
21	21	"Funk"	Elodie Keene	Ian Brennan	June 1, 2010	1ARC19	9.02
Will and Terri finalize their divorce. Attempting to deal with his sorrow, Will seeks revenge against Sue by seducing her and asking her on a date; he then stands her up, leaving Sue depressed and bedridden. With encouragement from a regretful Will, she leads the cheer squad to win at Nationals, and has their trophy placed in the choir room. Mercedes asks Quinn to move in with her family. The glee club learns Jesse has defected to Vocal Adrenaline, forcing Rachel to deal with her emotions as she discovers Jesse was using her to bring the club down. The glee club members are talked out of violent retaliation against Vocal Adrenaline by Will, and they instead perform "Give Up the Funk" to intimidate their rivals, who unlike New Directions have never been able to master a funk number.
22	22	"Journey to Regionals"	Brad Falchuk	Brad Falchuk	June 8, 2010	1ARC21	10.92
New Directions competes against Vocal Adrenaline and Aural Intensity at Regionals, in front of celebrity judges Olivia Newton-John, Josh Groban, Sue, and Rod Remington. Quinn's mother comes to watch the performance, and later invites Quinn to come back home, revealing that she has kicked her father out of the house. Vocal Adrenaline wins and New Directions comes last, despite unexpected support from Sue, who is able to identify with the club's underdog status after being derided by the other judges. She convinces Principal Figgins to grant the club a reprieve, and not disband them for another year. Will and Finn profess their love for Emma and Rachel respectively, although Emma reveals that she has begun dating her dentist. Quinn goes into labor and gives birth to a baby girl who is adopted by Shelby, who names the baby Beth at Puck's request.

== Cast ==
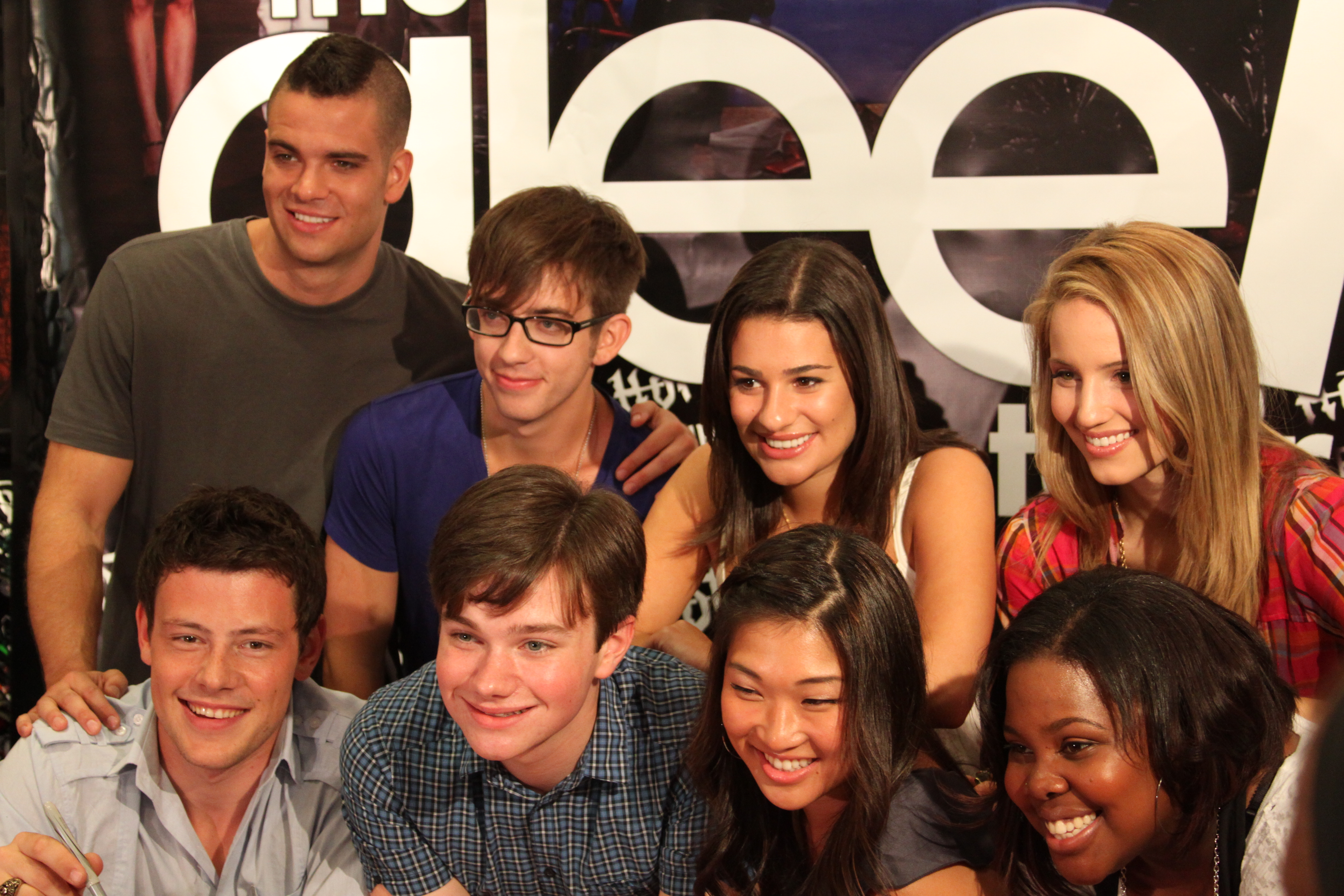
Actors Mark Salling, Kevin McHale, Lea Michele, Dianna Agron, Amber Riley, Jenna Ushkowitz, Chris Colfer and Cory Monteith (clockwise from upper left) star as members of the glee club.

The season had a cast of twelve actors who received star billing. Matthew Morrison played Will Schuester, director of the McKinley High glee club. Jane Lynch played Sue Sylvester, head coach of the cheerleading squad and the glee club's nemesis. Jayma Mays portrayed Emma Pillsbury, a mysophobic guidance counselor with romantic feelings for Will. Jessalyn Gilsig played Terri Schuester, Will's wife of five years. Lea Michele played Rachel Berry, the star of the glee club. Cory Monteith portrayed Finn Hudson, star quarterback of the school's football team, who is blackmailed into joining the club. Also playing club members were Amber Riley as Mercedes Jones, Chris Colfer as Kurt Hummel, Kevin McHale as Artie Abrams, and Jenna Ushkowitz as Tina Cohen-Chang. Mark Salling played Noah "Puck" Puckerman, a football player and bully who later joined the club, while Dianna Agron portrayed Quinn Fabray, Finn's girlfriend and captain of the cheerleading squad, who became pregnant with Puck's baby.

A number of secondary characters were also portrayed throughout the season, including Patrick Gallagher as Ken Tanaka, coach of the football team, Iqbal Theba as Principal Figgins, and Stephen Tobolowsky as former glee club director Sandy Ryerson. Mike O'Malley appeared as Kurt's father Burt Hummel, and Romy Rosemont played Finn's mother Carole Hudson. Naya Rivera and Heather Morris played Santana Lopez and Brittany Pierce, cheerleaders who joined the glee club with Quinn. Harry Shum, Jr. and Dijon Talton were initially hired for a single episode as football players Mike Chang and Matt Rutherford, but remained on the show as supporting members of the glee club.

Guest stars from musical backgrounds were often featured on the show, including John Lloyd Young as wood shop teacher Henri St. Pierre, and Victor Garber and Debra Monk as Will's parents. Josh Groban appeared playing an "ignorant asshole" version of himself, while Olivia Newton-John portrayed the "dark side" of herself; a "mixture of mean and diva". Kristin Chenoweth played April Rhodes, a former member of the glee club who never finished high school and ended up hitting rock bottom. Jonathan Groff played Jesse St. James, the male lead of rival glee club Vocal Adrenaline, and Idina Menzel appeared as Vocal Adrenaline director Shelby Corcoran, who is revealed in "Dream On" to be Rachel's biological mother. Fans had originally lobbied for Menzel to be cast as Rachel's mother due to the strong physical resemblance between Menzel and Michele. Eve played the Jane Addams Girls Choir director Grace Hitchens, having been cast after Whitney Houston declined to appear. Michael Hitchcock appeared as the Haverbrook School for the Deaf choir director Dalton Rumba.

Sarah Drew played Suzy Pepper, a senior with "an insane, absurd, psychotic crush on Mr. Schuester". Drew described Suzy as "kind of stalkerish and creepy", but ultimately redeemable. Gregg Henry and Charlotte Ross appeared as Quinn's parents, Russell and Judy Fabray, and Molly Shannon played Brenda Castle, an alcoholic astronomy teacher and badminton coach who clashed with Sue. Neil Patrick Harris guest starred as Bryan Ryan, Will's former glee club rival, now a school board member bent on vengeance against the club. Murphy created the role particularly for Harris, who received clearance from CBS to appear on Fox for the episode.

== Music ==
The show's musical performances proved to be a commercial success, with over seven million copies of Glee cast single releases purchased digitally. The cast performance of "Don't Stop Believin'" reached number two in the United Kingdom, and number four in the US and Ireland. It was certified gold by the Recording Industry Association of America (RIAA) on October 13, 2009, achieving over 730,000 digital sales. The cast had their first number one single with a cover of "Gives You Hell" in Ireland. By June 2010, the cast were second behind the Beatles for most chart appearances by a group act in the Billboard Hot 100's 52-year history, and seventh overall among all artists, with 71 appearances. The series' cover versions have also had a positive effect on the original recording artists, such as for Rihanna; sales of "Take a Bow" increased by 189 percent after the song was covered in the Glee episode "Showmance".

The series' debut album, Glee: The Music, Volume 1, reached number one in Ireland and the UK and was certified platinum by the Australian Recording Industry Association (ARIA), Canadian Recording Industry Association (CRIA), and British Phonographic Industry (BPI), and gold by the RIAA. In December 2009, the second album, Glee: The Music, Volume 2, topped the charts in New Zealand, Ireland, and Scotland. It has been certified platinum by the ARIA and CRIA, and gold by the BPI and RIAA. In 2010, the next two releases – Glee: The Music, The Power of Madonna and Glee: The Music, Volume 3 Showstoppers – both debuted at the number one position on the American and Canadian album charts. With the releases reaching number one in the US four weeks apart, the Glee cast beat the record previously set by the Beatles in 1966 for shortest span between first weeks at number one. This record was yet again beaten by Glee: The Music, Journey to Regionals, when it reached number one in the US three weeks later. Glee: The Music, Volume 3 Showstoppers also reached number one in Australia, Ireland, and Scotland, acquiring a gold certification by the ARIA. Glee: The Music, Journey to Regionals also reached number one in Ireland.

== Reception ==
=== Critical response ===
The review aggregator website Rotten Tomatoes gives the first season an 88% with an average rating of 7.94/10, based on 49 reviews. The site's consensus reads, "Entertaining, snarky, and full of heart, Glee is an addictive, toe-tapping musical dramedy that hits all the right notes." On Metacritic it received a score of 78 out of 100 based on 19 reviews, indicating "generally favorable" reviews.

Following the season preview in May 2009, Alessandra Stanley for The New York Times called the show "blissfully unoriginal in a witty, imaginative way", finding the characters to be stereotypes but noting "a strong satiric pulse that doesn't diminish the characters' identities or dim the showmanship of a talented cast". The Daily News's David Hinckley wrote that the show "isn't close to perfect" but "has likable characters, a good sense of humor and a reasonably deft touch with music." Mary McNamara for the Los Angeles Times found the series to have a wide audience appeal, deeming Glee "the first show in a long time that's just plain full-throttle, no-guilty-pleasure-rationalizations-necessary fun."

James Poniewozik of Time ranked Glee the eighth best television show of 2009 out of ten reviewed, deeming it "transcendent, tear-jerking and thrilling like nothing else on TV". He noted that the series did have faults, but praised its ambition and Lynch's "gaspingly funny" performance as Sue. Entertainment Weekly's Ken Tucker ranked the season ninth out of ten, lauding its novelty, while Lisa Respers France of CNN wrote that despite its "recipe for disaster" premise, the show's charm and bravado were enough to engage audiences. Variety's Brian Lowry was critical of the season's early episodes, highlighting acting and characterization issues, stating that the show's talent was squandered by its uneven tone and deeming Glee a one-hit-wonder. Following the mid-season finale, Lowry wrote that while the series still had problems, its musical performances and cast were enough to keep him watching, and despite its issues, "TV would be poorer without Glee." John Doyle of The Globe and Mail criticized the season's development, writing that while early episodes had been enjoyable, the show's success drew focus away from its characters and plot onto celebrity guest stars. Jean Bentley of MTV found the season uneven, writing that it began with a promising plot and impressive musical numbers, but became too "cheesy" and excessively sentimental. Raymund Flandez of The Wall Street Journal agreed that the season had definite highs and lows, but called the finale a "warm embrace that – let’s face it – you just don't want to let go."

After the episode "Showmance", the Parents Television Council named Glee the "Worst Show of the Week", deeming it inappropriate for teenagers due to its "sexually-charged adult" nature. Nancy Gibbs of Time magazine wrote that she had heard Glee described as "anti-Christian" by a youth minister, but commented that while almost all of the Ten Commandments are violated during the season, she found it insulting to teenagers to suggest that they would attempt to emulate what they saw on-screen. She described Glee as being about "a journey not just to college and career but to identity and conviction, the price of popularity, the compromises we must make between what we want and what we need." The episode "Wheels" attracted criticism from a committee of performers with disabilities, who felt that casting an able-bodied actor to play a student with disabilities was inappropriate. Falchuk responded that while he understood the concern and frustration of disability advocates, McHale had the singing and acting ability, talent and charisma required for the role.

=== Ratings ===
The pilot episode of Glee averaged 9.62 million viewers. Re-aired on September 2, 2009, in a director's cut version, it attained 4.2 million viewers. The second episode, "Showmance", premiered on September 9, 2009, averaging 7.50 million viewers and achieving a 3.5/9 rating/share in the 18–49 demographic. However, as Scott Collins for the Los Angeles Times noted, the other major networks besides Fox all opened the evening by airing a speech by President Barack Obama, disrupting regular viewing patterns. Furthermore, the official fall season had yet to begin, placing Glee against weaker competition in the ratings than the remainder of the season would experience. The following eight episodes ranged between 6.63 and 7.65 million viewers, falling to a series low of 6.17 million viewers with "Hairography" on November 25, 2009. The episode aired the night before Thanksgiving, when all the major networks saw decreased ratings. Viewership improved for the final two episodes of the first half of the season, with "Mattress" and "Sectionals" drawing 8.15 and 8.13 million viewers respectively. Glee returned on April 13, 2010, with "Hell-O", which was watched by 13.66 million viewers, the series' season high, up 46 percent on its previous season high with the pilot episode. The following six episodes attained between 11.49 and 12.98 million viewers, falling to 9.02 million for the penultimate episode "Funk". The episode began with a 3.6/10 rating/share in the 18–49 demographic, rising to 4.1/11 in the last 30 minutes. It was down 21 percent on the previous episode, but was Glee's best 18–49 rating for an episode not following American Idol. The final episode, "Journey to Regionals", was watched by 11.07 million viewers and attained a 4.7 Nielsen rating in the 18–49 demographic, an increase of 18 percent on the previous episode, giving Glee the highest finale rating for a new show in the 2009–2010 television season.

=== Accolades ===
During its first season, Glee was nominated for 86 awards, of which 37 were won. Murphy and Barclay were both nominated for the "Outstanding Directing – Comedy Series" award at the 2010 Directors Guild of America Awards for their work on "Pilot" and "Wheels" respectively. The series was nominated for ten Creative Arts Emmy Awards and nine Primetime Emmy Awards. It received eight nominations at the Gay, Lesbian and Bi People's Choice Awards, run by the gay media websites AfterEllen.com and AfterElton.com, of which it won seven. It was also awarded three Dorian Awards by the Gay and Lesbian Entertainment Critics Association. Glee received four nominations at the 67th Golden Globe Awards, winning one, and was nominated in six categories at the 2009 Satellite Awards, winning five. Glee received three nominations for the Teen Choice Awards in 2009, and thirteen in 2010. The series received four nominations for the 2010 TCA Awards, winning three, while Brennan, Falchuk and Murphy each received two nominations at the 2010 Writers Guild of America Awards.

The series won "Outstanding TV Program of the Year" at the 2009 AFI Awards, "Favorite New TV Comedy" at the 2010 People's Choice Awards, "Outstanding Comedy Series" at the 21st GLAAD Media Awards, "Future Classic" at the 2010 TV Land Awards, a Peabody Award for excellence, and "Do Something TV Show" at the VH1 Do Something Awards. It was also nominated for the "NAACP Image Award for Outstanding Comedy Series" at the NAACP Image Awards, the "Comedy Series Episode" Prism Awards for "Vitamin D", "Fave International Band" and "Fave TV Show" at the Nickelodeon Australian Kids Choice Awards 2010, and shortlisted for the "YouTube Audience Award" at the BAFTA Awards. The cast won "Favorite New Television Cast Ensemble" at the Diversity Awards, and "Outstanding Performance by an Ensemble in a Comedy Series" at the 2010 Screen Actors Guild Awards. In 2009, the crew won an Artios Award for the casting of "Pilot". They also won "Outstanding Musical Supervision – TV" at the Hollywood Music in Media Awards, and the "Outstanding Contemporary Television Series" award at the CDG Awards, and were nominated for the "Single Camera Television Series" Art Directors Guild Award for "Pilot", and "Outstanding Achievement in Sound Mixing for a Television Series" at the Cinema Audio Society Awards for "Wheels". In 2010, David Klotz won "Best Sound Editing: Short Form Music in Television" at the Golden Reel Awards for his work on "Pilot", "Wheels" won a "Television With a Conscience" Television Academy Honors award, and Brennan, Falchuk and Murphy jointly won "Comedy Writer of the Year" at the Just for Laughs Awards.

== Home video releases ==
Glee – Pilot Episode: Director's Cut was released on Region 1 DVD in the US on September 1, 2009, exclusively to Wal-Mart. It was released on Region 4 DVD in Australia and New Zealand on November 25, 2009, and on Region 2 DVD in the UK and Ireland on January 25, 2010. The DVD includes a preview of the episode "Showmance", plus a deconstruction of the series by creator Ryan Murphy.

Glee – Season 1, Volume 1: Road to Sectionals contains the first thirteen episodes of the first season. It was released as a four-disc box set on Region 1 DVD in the US and Canada on December 29, 2009. It was released on Region 4 DVD in Australia and New Zealand on March 31, 2010, and on Region 2 DVD in the UK and Ireland on April 19, 2010, and in South Africa on August 14, 2010. Special features include full length audition pieces from the pilot episode by Michele as Rachel and Riley as Mercedes, plus casting and choreography featurettes. Glee – Season 1, Volume 2: Road to Regionals contains the final nine episodes of the first season. It was released on Region 2 DVD in the UK and Ireland on September 13, 2010, Region 1 DVD in the US on September 14, 2010, and on Region 4 DVD in Australia and New Zealand on September 22, 2010.

Glee – The Complete Season 1 was released on Region 2 DVD on September 13, 2010, Region 1 DVD on September 14, 2010, and Region 4 DVD on September 22, 2010. The seven-disc box set contains the full 22 episode first season, including extended episodes, sing-along karaoke, a behind-the-scenes look at "The Power of Madonna" episode, Glee makeovers, never-before-seen 'Sue's Corner' segments and a dance tutorial. It was also released as a four-disc Blu-ray box set.

Glee – Pilot Episode: Director's Cut
Set details	Special features	
1 episode; Single disc; 1.78:1 Aspect Ratio; Subtitles: English, Spanish; English (Dolby Digital 5.1 Surround); Run-time: 73 minutes	Sneak preview of "Showmance"; Deconstructing Glee with Ryan Murphy; Dance Boot Camp; What Is Glee?; Music video of "On My Own" by Lea Michele; Full performance of "Respect" by Amber Riley	
DVD release dates
Region 1	Region 2	Region 4
September 1, 2009	January 25, 2010	November 25, 2009

Glee – Season 1, Volume 1: Road to Sectionals
Set details	Special features	
13 episodes; Four-disc DVD set; 1.78:1 Aspect Ratio; Subtitles: English, French, Spanish, Brazilian-Portuguese; English (Dolby Digital 5.1 Surround); Run-time: 580 minutes	Full-length audition pieces; Music video of "On My Own" by Lea Michele; Full performance of "Respect" by Amber Riley; Welcome to McKinley featurette; Fox Movie Channel casting session; Deconstructing Glee with Ryan Murphy; Dance Boot Camp; Repurposed Web VAM	
DVD release dates
Region 1	Region 2	Region 4
December 29, 2009	April 19, 2010	March 31, 2010

Glee – Season 1, Volume 2: Road to Regionals
Set details	Special features	
9 episodes; Three-disc DVD set; 1.78:1 Aspect Ratio; Subtitles: English, French and Spanish; English (Dolby Digital 5.1 Surround); Run-time: 407 minutes; Released on Australia as a limited edition	Sing-along karaoke; Behind-the-scenes on "The Power of Madonna"; Bite Their Style: Dress Like Your Favorite Gleek; Making of a Showstopper; Staying in Step With Glee; Glee makeovers; Dance tutorial; Bundled with a bonus disc in Australia	
DVD release dates
Region 1	Region 2	Region 4
September 14, 2010	September 13, 2010	September 22, 2010

Glee – The Complete First Season
Set details	Special features	
22 episodes; Seven-disc DVD or four-disc BD set; 1.78:1 Aspect Ratio; Subtitles: English, Spanish, French, Brazilian-Portuguese (BD); English 5.1 DTS HD Master Audio (BD) / 5.1 Dolby Digital (DVD); Run-time: 1045 minutes (DVD) / 1040 minutes (BD)	All special features on Glee – Season 1, Volume 1: Road to Sectionals; All special features on Glee – Season 1, Volume 2: Road to Regionals; Blu-ray Exclusive: Behind the Pilot: A Visual Commentary with Cast and Crew; Bundled with a bonus T-shirt in Australia	
DVD release dates
Region 1	Region 2	Region 4
September 14, 2010	September 13, 2010	September 22, 2010
