= Emma Pillsbury =

Fictional character from the Fox series Glee

- Glee character
- Jayma Mays as Emma Pillsbury in Glee
- First appearance: "Pilot" (2009)
- Last appearance: "Dreams Come True" (2015)
- Created by: Ryan Murphy; Brad Falchuk; Ian Brennan
- Portrayed by: Jayma Mays

In-universe information
- Occupation: Guidance counselor
- Family: Rusty Pillsbury (father); Rose Pillsbury (mother)
- Spouses: Carl Howell (annulled); Will Schuester
- Significant other: Ken Tanaka (ex-fiancé)
- Children: Daniel Finn Schuester (son); Unnamed twin sons Unnamed daughter
- Relatives: Betty Pillsbury (niece)
- Religion: Christian

Emma Pillsbury Schuester (previously Pillsbury-Howell) is a fictional character from the Fox musical comedy-drama series Glee. Portrayed by actress Jayma Mays, Emma appeared in Glee from its pilot episode, first broadcast on May 19, 2009. Emma was developed by Glee creators Ryan Murphy, Brad Falchuk and Ian Brennan. She is a guidance counselor at the fictional William McKinley High School in Lima, Ohio, where the series is set. Emma has obsessive-compulsive disorder and has romantic feelings for glee club director Will Schuester (Matthew Morrison), but she becomes engaged to football coach Ken Tanaka (Patrick Gallagher), as Will is married. Ken ultimately breaks up with her on their wedding day because of her feelings for Will, and when Will leaves his wife, Terri (Jessalyn Gilsig), he and Emma share a kiss. Their relationship is short-lived, and in the second season, Emma and her dentist boyfriend Carl Howell (John Stamos) marry in Las Vegas. The marriage is later annulled, as it was unconsummated. At the beginning of the third season, she and Will are living together; they become engaged shortly after New Year, and they consummate their relationship near the end of the school year. Emma leaves Will at the altar midway through the fourth season, but the two later reconcile and marry in the season finale. She becomes pregnant during the middle of the fifth season.

Mays feels the character has much depth, juxtaposing Emma's position helping the students with her own phobia of germs and love for a married man. She explained that "the character is not a stereotypical TV-style husband-stealer who immediately would be luring the dude into the sack, but rather seems like a real person facing real issues." Mays has performed several musical numbers in the show, including "I Could Have Danced All Night" from My Fair Lady, Madonna's "Like a Virgin", "Touch-a, Touch-a, Touch-a, Touch Me" from The Rocky Horror Show, "Afternoon Delight" by the Starland Vocal Band, and The 5th Dimension's "Wedding Bell Blues". "Touch-a, Touch-a, Touch-a, Touch Me" was originally Mays' audition piece; her performance of it on Glee was met with critical acclaim. The songs appear on the series' soundtrack albums and EPs.

The character has been well received by critics, including Mike Hale of The New York Times, who praised Mays for being able to "[register] Emma's devastation with just the slightest widening of [her] enormous eyes." Critics responded well to the development of Emma and Will's relationship. Eric Goldman of IGN wrote that their first kiss was "hard to not feel good about". Dan Snierson of Entertainment Weekly, however, suggested that it may have been "more intriguing" to leave their romance unresolved.

== Storylines ==
Emma is introduced as the guidance counselor at William McKinley High School. She has romantic feelings for Spanish and glee teacher Will Schuester (Matthew Morrison), and encourages him in his attempt to revitalise the school glee club. She is dismayed to learn that Will's wife Terri (Jessalyn Gilsig) is pregnant and that he is considering leaving the teaching profession to become an accountant, but is able to convince him to reconsider by showing him a video of him singing. In an attempt to get over Will, Emma begins dating football coach Ken Tanaka (Patrick Gallagher), and becomes engaged to him in the episode "Vitamin D". However, when Will is unable to attend a competition with the glee club, Emma volunteers to take them in his place, and postpones her own wedding by several hours. Acknowledging her continuing feelings for Will, Ken breaks up with her on their wedding day. Emma tells Will that she has resigned from the school, as she is ashamed of her behavior with Ken, and is heartbroken that she cannot be with Will. Will tells her that he has left Terri, but Emma feels it is too soon for him to move on. Regardless, as she later prepares to leave the school, Will finds her and stops her with a kiss.

Emma and Will pursue a relationship, but Emma fears that he may be repeating patterns from his relationship with Terri because of his difficulties with being alone. She reveals that she is a virgin, and though she decides to have sex with Will, she changes her mind at the last moment. Will suggests that she see a counselor for help with her debilitating issues. Emma later discovers that Will kissed another woman and verbally berates him, terminating their relationship. In the season finale, Will kisses Emma and tells her that he loves her. Emma begins a relationship with her dentist, Dr. Carl Howell (John Stamos), which leads to a Vegas wedding. Her reservations about sex lead her to become faculty advisor to the school's celibacy club. Carl arranges a meeting with sex education teacher Holly Holliday (Gwyneth Paltrow), and reveals that they have yet to sleep together. Emma confesses that she may still have feelings for Will, and Carl tells her he will be moving into a hotel until she is certain of her feelings.

In "A Night of Neglect", Emma reveals to Will that Carl has left her for good and wants an annulment, since their marriage was never consummated. Because of the stress, Emma's OCD affects her far more than usual, and she feels regretful because she thought she would have overcome it by that point in her life. Will tells Emma that he will be there for her no matter what, and also urges her to get treatment for her OCD. She starts seeing a psychiatrist in the episode "Born This Way", and is showing signs of improvement by the end of season two. Over the summer, Will and Emma move in together, although they have not consummated their relationship. That they are both thinking of an eventual marriage is made clear in the episode "Asian F", and when Will invites her parents to dinner in that episode, he discovers that they are "ginger supremacists" who mock Emma's OCD, the roots of which are shown in flashbacks with them and an eight-year-old Emma. Will asks Emma to marry him in "Yes/No" and she accepts. Later that winter, a tenured position opens at McKinley High, and although Will and Sue Sylvester compete against each other for the position, it is ultimately given to Emma rather than either of them. Will and Emma finally consummate their relationship in "Nationals" after New Directions wins the show choir championship.

However, the lack of anxiety when performing compulsions (such as washing each grape individually) calls the diagnosis into question. Individuals with OCD experience panic and stress when carrying out compulsions.

When Will is named to a national blue-ribbon panel on the arts in Washington, DC, early in the fourth season, he expects Emma to come with him, but Emma is very reluctant to do so: she does not want to leave her job for several months while he is away. They ultimately agree that Emma will stay behind and the two will reunite on weekends. They also agree to get married when Will returns, but the stress of planning a big wedding proves too much for Emma, and she leaves the church before the ceremony begins. She and Will eventually reconcile, and the two finally get married in the choir room with the glee club as witnesses in "All or Nothing", after New Directions win Regionals. Following their marriage, the couple decide to have children, but are unable to conceive for several months. They are desperately trying to do so in the fifth season's tenth episode "Trio", and are caught having sex in the school by Becky Jackson (Lauren Potter). At the end of the episode, Emma reveals to Will that she is pregnant. In "Opening Night" Emma gives birth to a boy, Daniel Finn Schuester. During the final season, in the episode "Transitioning", she convinces a torn Will to choose what's best for him, to stay at Vocal Adrenaline with a promising salary and facility but unhappy or to stop. In a parallel episode to the Pilot, 2009, she is aware and concerned with Kurt's depression and consults with his father about it and also convinces Will to stay with the Glee Club as the kids still needs him and that it what makes him happy. In the series finale, "Dreams Come True", she is now living happily with the newly promoted Will as the principal and in the future they have more kids together. She appears at the McKinley auditorium's rededication to Finn Hudson and enjoys the final performance of the New Directions. She is visibly shocked when Will and Terri hug and together with all of the Glee Cast take a final bow.

== Development ==
=== Casting and creation ===
Emma is portrayed by actress Jayma Mays. In the third season episode "Asian F", Hannah Spiros plays an eight-year-old Emma. Prior to her casting in Glee, Mays was already an established actress in both the television and film industries, but had little theatrical experience. In casting Glee, series creator Ryan Murphy sought actors who could identify with the rush of starring in theatrical roles. Auditioning actors with no theatrical experience were required to prove they could sing and dance as well as act, and Mays auditioned with the song "Touch-a, Touch-a, Touch-a, Touch Me" from The Rocky Horror Show. Asked what originally drew her to the role of Emma, Mays said:

"Everything, really. Actually, the second I got the sides. I got the sides just for that character before I got the whole script. And just from the sides alone in the pilot, I could tell she was such a well developed character. And there was so much going on with her just from those few sheets of paper that I had kind of describing who she was. I knew immediately that there was a lot that was going to be going on with her. And I think that's hard to find sometimes with roles for women. There's maybe not so many layers to them, always. And I just felt from the get go that there was so much going on. And I also knew that Ryan Murphy was involved. I knew that was exciting to me, too. As soon as I heard that, I knew that there would be something good on the page. So I was immediately drawn to it."

Debbie Gibson auditioned for the role in 2009. The show would later confuse Gibson and Tiffany Darwish in a joke in a 2011 episode featuring Gwyneth Paltrow.

=== Characterization ===
In the first episode, it is revealed that Emma has obsessive-compulsive disorder, suffering from mysophobia, a fear of germs. The show garnered mostly praise for its portrayal of a character with OCD and for accurately depicting OCD as a serious but treatable anxiety disorder. However, many OCD experts have pointed out the lack of anxiety when performing her compulsions, which puts in doubt her diagnosis.

Bill Harris of the Toronto Sun assessed that her phobia is "comical" and that Emma's initial role in the series is comic relief. Mays has explained that "the character is not a stereotypical TV-style husband-stealer who immediately would be luring the dude into the sack, but rather seems like a real person facing real issues." Mays added: "This is something that's part of a lot of people's lives. But Emma is not a cheater. They've portrayed her as being somewhat virginal. There's purity there. She doesn't just hone in [sic] and say, 'I want to destroy this guy's relationship.' So Emma is hopeful and sad at the same time. Funny, too. Sounds like real life, where, as stated earlier, you can't help who you love." David Hinckley of the New York Daily News described her as "good-hearted and smart. Emma is also so obsessive-compulsive she counts the bristles on her toothbrush."

Mays has deemed Emma an "amazing" character to play, and has explained: "I don't find that female characters are always written with a lot of depth, but she's so well defined on the page. Sure, she's terrified of germs and in love with a married man, so seeing her as the voice of reason for the kids is amazing." Emma's relationship with Will will continue to grow, as "she has these moments of clarity when she's talking to Will because he calms her." Mays described her in an interview with TheTVChick:

"She is a romantic at heart. But she's practical. She's very interesting, because she does have those dreams and hopes of finding the right man. And in her mind, even though Will Schuester's married, that sort of guy is like the perfect guy for her. She's very practical in the fact that she doesn't want to be alone and she knows that she's somewhat limited in a small town to men. And Ken Tanaka is a very nice man, he's not exactly like Will, but he's good to her and he's solid. He's got a job, and he understands her and he understands all her quirks and stuff. So she's practical, she knows that just might be her lot in life. So it's weird. She's got this very dreamy side about her and who she wants to be and what she wants her life to be like. But she's also got this very practical, down-to-earth, well this is kind of the best I can do thing. It's funny a lot of people have thought that part about her is weak. Like a weak character flaw, but I actually don't think that's true. I really just think that's the practical side of her. I think that's her being practical. And I think a lot of people are like that sometimes."

Discussing Emma's style and costuming, Glee's costume designer Lou Eyrich has explained: "We wanted to make her look like everything's so neat—perfectly ironed and tucked-in shirts with matching belts, shoes and pins. We wanted to make her stand out from the other teachers. She's always so happy and excited, so we wanted her outfits to represent that sunny disposition. In the pilot, we made her look much more teacher-y. Now we're having more fun with her character, keeping her bright and unusual. Quirky is the word. Emma's also always in stacked Mary Janes or T-strap heels. It takes the outfit down from being too stylish or too sexy. It makes her look prim and almost old-fashioned."

=== Relationships ===
Emma's relationship with glee club coach Will Schuester is an integral part of her character. They have had an on and off relationship since the show's first season. Television critics have responded extremely well to the pairing between the two. Mandi Bierly for Entertainment Weekly said of the episode "Vitamin D": "Matthew Morrison communicates so much with his eyes. There's a softness and a longing in them that I'm always surprised Emma (Jayma Mays) matches." Critics also commented positively on the development of Will and Emma's relationship in the episode "Sectionals". Natalie Abrams of TV Guide noted that she had been waiting for them to kiss since the pilot episode, and Eric Goldman of IGN has deemed their coming together "very hard to not feel good about". Dan Snierson, however, wrote that although there was satisfaction in the episode ending on the kiss, it may have been "more intriguing" to conclude when Will finds Emma's empty office, and having him then question whether it was too soon for the two of them to begin a relationship. Eric Goldman of IGN commented of the following episode: " I would have liked to at least see Shue and Emma as a couple for a few episodes, rather than such a quick split. It felt rushed." Emily VanDerWerff added: "I loved Emma's eruption to Will about how Sue Sylvester must have cheated and the kids deserved to win." Robert Canning said of the Britney Spears oriented episode: "The true focus of the episode was Will dealing with his lack of spontaneity. This stood as a contrast to the impulsiveness of Emma's new boyfriend, sexy dentist Carl played by the somehow always charming John Stamos. There's a fun love triangle building here which should only get better as Will becomes less of an insecure whiner."

Jayma Mays commented of their relationship: "Oh no! I don't know if I can say! That's a hard question because when you see the scenes of Emma and Will, you obviously think 'Oh of course they're supposed to be together, of course, of course!' but the fact is, is that he's a married man and Emma knows that's wrong, and she doesn't want to be a homewrecker. She doesn't want to ruin a relationship. So I guess in a perfect world, she could find someone like Will, or maybe Ken Tanaka (laughs) can become a little bit more like Will. But maybe it's all about respect. Maybe if she can respect Ken enough, that will develop into true love." She also commented of her co-star Matthew Morrison (Will): "We were friends. We knew each other before we started this job. We worked together once before. So, that's always helpful when you know the person that you're working with, and you already feel comfortable around them. But yeah, he's a really good friend, so that makes that stuff a little bit easier."

== Reception ==
Variety's Brian Lowry deemed the adult cast of early Glee "over-the-top buffoons", however opined that Emma offered "modest redemption". The Los Angeles Times's Denise Martin called Mays as Emma "just as funny" as Lynch's Sue, and noted: "Emma doesn't get the zingers Coach Sue gets, but she makes me laugh just as hard." Harris commented that, "Despite the sad seriousness of [Emma's love for Will], the tightly wound Emma [...]also is one of the funniest characters in Glee. Go figure. It's funny, because everything is kind of heavy that's going on in her life, with these phobias and this guy she loves who's married, yet she still is a bit of the comic relief." Mandi Bierly for Entertainment Weekly noted of the episode "Vitamin D" that she had hoped Emma would decline Ken's proposal: "I want Emma to be strong and know it's better to be without someone for the right reason than to be with someone for the wrong one." Mike Hale for The New York Times praised Mays' performance in the episode. He noted: "Jayma Mays registered Emma's devastation with just the slightest widening of those enormous eyes. In fact all the best non-singing moments in the episode were hers."

Critics commented positively on the development of Will and Emma's relationship; TV Guide's Natalie Abrams wrote that she had been waiting for them to kiss since the pilot episode. Flandez felt that the kiss made the "poignant moment" of the glee club's final performance "even more dear", and hoped that it would not be the last between them, while Aly Semigran of MTV praised the development and called the kiss "sweet [and] longing". Goldman wrote: "Schue and Emma finally coming together was very hard to not feel good about, even though you know it just won't be that easy when the show returns". Gerrick Kennedy of the Los Angeles Times opined that it was clear Ken and Emma would not marry, and added that when Will kissed Emma: "I died". In discussing Will and Emma's conversation about how she would have left Ken if Will had shown any interest in her, Pardue commented: "That's maybe the sweetest and the saddest thing I've ever heard." She called the kiss between Will and Emma "romantic" commenting that it made her "heart happy". Entertainment Weekly's Dan Snierson commented that although there was satisfaction in the episode ending on the kiss, it may have been "more intriguing" to conclude with Will finding Emma's office empty, or "before she smiled approvingly after their kiss", questioning whether it was too soon for the two of them to begin a relationship, or "about freakin' time".

Emily VanDerWerff of The A.V. Club was critical of Emma in the show's second season. She said: "Emma is apparently married, but we haven't seen her husband since October, and even when he was more of a "fixture" on the show (which is difficult to say about a character who's appeared as little as Carl Howell has), his relationship with Emma made no sense as anything other than a plot device. Now, as it turns out, Emma and Carl haven't consummated their marriage at all, and this has something to do with the fact that the show has combined Emma's germ-phobia and virginity into some sort of terrifying psychosexual pathology that doesn't make much sense and doesn't resemble the somewhat levelheaded person she used to be. (The plotting in Will Schuester's love life is the one place where the show attempts to have even a modicum of continuity, for whatever reason.) Anyway, Carl is necessarily upset about this, and he's also upset when Holly Holliday gets Emma to admit that she still has confusing feelings for Will, so he resolves to let her stay in the condo while he stays in the Radisson where all of the good big-name Glee guest stars go to hope their pilots for the fall are picked up."

== Musical performances ==
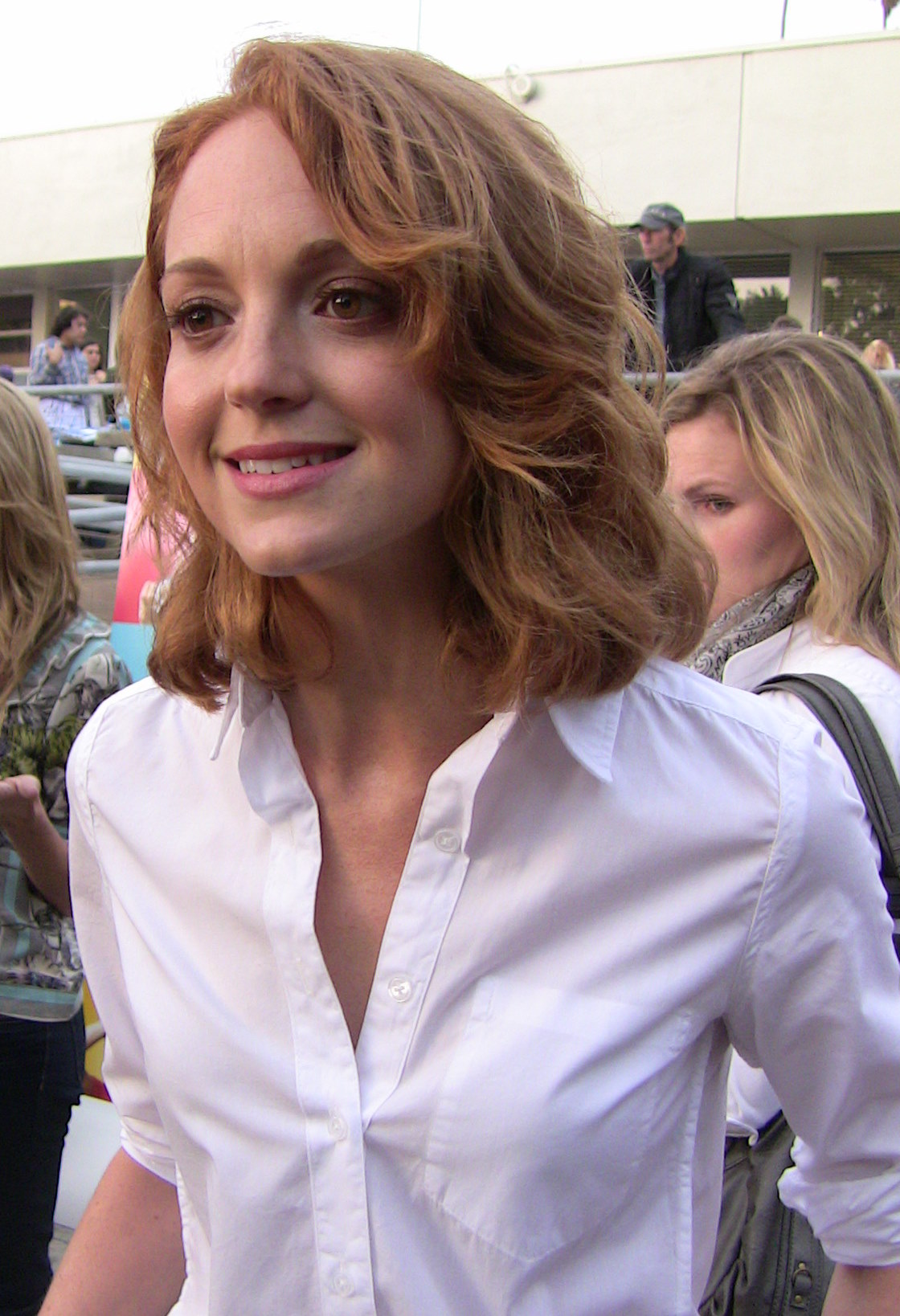
Mays' musical performance in the episode "Mash-Up" was well received by critics.

Mays performed a cover version of "I Could Have Danced All Night" from My Fair Lady in the episode "Mash-Up", a studio recording of which was included as a bonus-track on copies of Glee: The Music, Volume 1 purchased from Target stores. Raymund Flandez of The Wall Street Journal called the performance "lovely", and Andrea Reiher for Zap2it similarly praised the piece: "wow, she has a nice voice! She's no Julie Andrews, but she'll do." Eric Goldman for IGN commented: "Seeing Emma sing "I Could Have Danced All Night" was sweet, though was it just me (or my TV), or was the volume on her vocals a bit unusually loud? I also could have done without Will's line telling her she should sing to help her keep the beat as she danced – come on Glee, you're a musical. Embrace it and just let her sing."

Mays said that she "had fun singing," but found the experience "terrifying," as she had never given a musical performance on camera before. She derided her choreography skills, and elaborated: "I was so nervous that day. I had to keep eating bread and toast because my stomach was so sick. But it was an interesting experience. It was definitely a challenge for me. Of course if they ask me to do it again, I would do it again. But I'm not going to go begging them for it."

In her first lead solo performance since the first season, Mays performed "Touch-a, Touch-a, Touch-a, Touch Me" from The Rocky Horror Show during the themed episode "The Rocky Horror Glee Show"; it was the song she'd used when auditioning for the role of Emma. Anthony Benigno of the Daily News named it the best song of the episode, and graded it "A+". Despite finding the episode "abrupt, uneven [and] sanitized", Flandez felt that it was saved by this performance. Erica Futterman of Rolling Stone remarked that having Emma in the role of Janet was "ideal", but preferred the song visually to vocally. Slant Magazine's Matt Zoller Seitz disliked the change in Emma's characterization which brought about the number, and while he wrote that "Mays was so charming that she almost, almost saved it", he ultimately found the "motivational contortions" insulting to the audience. The track was included on the EP Glee: The Music, The Rocky Horror Glee Show. It charted at number 72 in the UK, and 96 in Canada.

In season three, Mays performs "Wedding Bell Blues" in the episode "Yes/No", which was described by Bobby Hankinson of The Houston Chronicle as "the perfect combination of a great song, plot relevance, and Princess Beatrice hat". TV Guide's Kate Stanhope agreed with him on all three points, and added that it was "a great pick for her vocals". TVLine's Michael Slezak described those vocals as "a breath of dewy spring air" and gave the song an "A", but Joseph Brannigan Lynch of Entertainment Weekly thought Emma was not "much of a singer" and gave the number a "B−", though he said "the curiosity of backup vocals from Coach Beiste and Sue Sylvester made this entirely worthwhile".

In season four, Mays is one of eight singers featured in the performance of "The Scientist" by Coldplay in the episode "The Break-Up". She also performed the song "(Not) Getting Married Today" from the musical Company with Morrison and Amber Riley in the episode "I Do" and "You're All The World to Me" from Royal Wedding in the following episode, again with Morrison.
