= Destination: Infestation =

- Written by: Mary Weinstein
- Directed by: George Mendeluk
- Starring: Jessalyn Gilsig
- Countries of origin: Canada; United States
- Original language: English

Production
- Running time: 89 mins

Original release
- Network: Lifetime Movie Network
- Release: July 2, 2007

Destination: Infestation (in some markets released on DVD as Swarm or Deadly Swarm and online as Ants On A Plane) is a 2007 Canadian-American made for TV production in the disaster film genre, directed by George Mendeluk. It premiered in the US on the women-oriented Lifetime Movie Network.

== Plot ==
A US passenger plane returning from Colombia to Miami is overrun by an infestation of mutated bullet ants, whose sting is the most painful of all insect stings and can be deadly. A government official refuses to allow an emergency landing, out of fear that the ants will enter the United States, so a female entomologist on board joins forces with the plane's rugged sky marshal in a desperate attempt to save the flight from disaster, while the ants are busy gnawing on electrical cables and various other fiber optics.

== Cast ==
- Jessalyn Gilsig as Dr. Carrie Ross
- Antonio Sabato Jr. as Sky Marshal Ethan Hart
- Serge Houde as Captain McReady
- Karen Holness as Kayla Johnson
- Matt Bellefleur as Ken
- Matthew Harrison as Dean Phillips
- Emily Tennant as Jamie Ross
- Craig Veroni as Neil Webb
