= Pilot (Glee) =

Pilot episode of Glee

- Glee episode
- New Directions performs "Don't Stop Believin'" on stage, convincing Will not to leave the school.
- Episode no.: Season 1 Episode 1
- Directed by: Ryan Murphy
- Written by: Ryan Murphy; Brad Falchuk; Ian Brennan
- Production code: 1ARC79
- Original air date: May 19, 2009
- Running time: 48 minutes

Guest appearances
- Stephen Tobolowsky as Sandy Ryerson; Patrick Gallagher as Ken Tanaka; Iqbal Theba as Principal Figgins; Romy Rosemont as Carole Hudson; Ben Bledsoe as Hank Saunders; Justin Gaston as a football player; Kent Avenido as Howard Bamboo; Naya Rivera as Santana Lopez

Episode chronology
← Previous —	Next → "Showmance"
- Glee season 1

"Pilot" is the first episode of the American television series Glee. It premiered on the Fox network on May 19, 2009. An extended director's cut version aired on September 2, 2009. The show focuses on a high school show choir, also known as a glee club, set within the fictional William McKinley High School in Lima, Ohio. The pilot episode covers the formation of the club and introduces the main characters. The episode was directed by series creator Ryan Murphy, and written by Murphy, Brad Falchuk and Ian Brennan. Murphy selected the music featured in the episode, with the intention of maintaining a balance between showtunes and chart hits.

The episode achieved 9.619 million viewers on first broadcast, and 4.2 million when the director's cut version aired. Critical response was mixed, with The New York Times's Alessandra Stanley highlighting the episode's unoriginality and stereotyped characters, but praising the showmanship and talent of the cast. The Daily News's David Hinckley opined that the show was imperfect and implausible but "potentially heartwarming", while USA Today's Robert Bianco noted casting and tone problems, but commented positively on the show's humor and musical performances. Mary McNamara for the Los Angeles Times wrote that the show had a wide audience appeal, calling it: "the first show in a long time that's just plain full-throttle, no-guilty-pleasure-rationalizations-necessary fun."

== Plot ==
Spanish teacher Will Schuester learns that Sandy Ryerson, the head of William McKinley High School's Glee Club, has been fired for inappropriate sexual behavior towards a male student. The school principal, Figgins, gives Will permission to take over the club, which angers Sue Sylvester, the head of the school's successful cheerleading squad, Cheerios. Will also faces resistance from his wife, Terri Schuester, who urges Will to abandon teaching and pursue a more financially stable career to increase their income.

Undeterred, Will sets out to rejuvenate the glee club, renaming the group New Directions, which attracts the attention of the ambitious Rachel Berry, powerhouse vocalist Mercedes Jones, fashionable Kurt Hummel, paraplegic Artie Abrams, and shy Tina Cohen-Chang. When Will tries to convince the school's football players to join glee club, he overhears kindhearted football quarterback Finn Hudson singing in the locker room showers; he blackmails Finn by planting his marijuana in his locker as a way to help him change. Not wanting to upset his widowed mother, Finn agrees to join New Directions.

Will and school guidance counselor Emma Pillsbury take the group to witness a performance by Vocal Adrenaline, a rival glee club. They perform an impressive rendition of Amy Winehouse's "Rehab," which leaves the New Directions apprehensive about their own chances in the upcoming regional show choir competition. Following the performance, Terri reveals to Will that she is pregnant. Believing he needs to support his family, Will regretfully tells the club he is resigning, and applies for a job as an accountant.

Finn is attacked by the football team for his involvement with New Directions, and he initially decides to quit the club. When Finn watches the team trap Artie in a portable toilet, Finn refuses to take part and rescues Artie. He apologizes to the glee club members, and the group resolves to continue without Will. Meanwhile, Emma urges Will to reconsider his decision to leave by showing him a video of him performing in Glee Club when he was at McKinley High. Will then comes across the New Directions performing "Don't Stop Believin'" in the auditorium. Impressed by the performance, Will decides to stay at McKinley, telling the club he couldn't bear to see them win Nationals without him.

== Production ==
=== Conception ===
Ryan Murphy, Brad Falchuk, and Ian Brennan created Glee. Murphy drew inspiration from his own childhood, which saw him play the lead role in all of his high school's musicals. Brennan and producer Mike Novick were also highly involved in their own schools' glee clubs. Brennan originally wrote a script for a Glee movie, but Murphy believed the concept would work better as a TV series. Fox picked up the series pilot within 15 hours of receiving the script, which Murphy attributes in part to the success of the network's American Idol, commenting: "It made sense for the network with the biggest hit in TV, which is a musical, to do something in that vein". Murphy intended the show to be a form of escapism, explaining: "There's so much on the air right now about people with guns, or sci-fi, or lawyers running around. This is a different genre, there's nothing like it on the air at the networks and cable. Everything's so dark in the world right now, that's why 'Idol' worked. It's pure escapism." With regards to Glee's audience, Murphy intended for it to be a family show that would appeal to adults as well as children, with adult characters starring equally alongside the teenage leads. Glee is set in Lima, Ohio. Murphy chose a Midwest setting as he himself originates from Indiana, and recalls childhood visits to Ohio to the Kings Island theme park. Although set in Lima, the show is actually filmed at Paramount Studios in Hollywood.

=== Music ===
The episode features covers of numerous songs sung on-screen by the characters. Musical segments take the form of performances, as opposed to the characters singing spontaneously, as the intention is for the series to remain reality-based. Murphy has commented that his interest lay in creating a "postmodern musical", rather than "doing a show where people burst into song", drawing on the format of Chicago. Murphy is responsible for selecting all of the songs used, and strives to maintain a balance between show tunes and chart hits, as: "I want there to be something for everybody in every episode. That's a tricky mix, but that's very important – the balancing of that."

Songs featured in the pilot include: "Where Is Love?" from Oliver!, Aretha Franklin's "Respect", "Mister Cellophane" from Chicago, Katy Perry's "I Kissed a Girl", "On My Own" from Les Misérables, "Sit Down, You're Rockin' the Boat" from Guys and Dolls, "You're the One That I Want" from Grease, REO Speedwagon's "Can't Fight This Feeling", Amy Winehouse's "Rehab" and "Don't Stop Believin'" and "Lovin', Touchin', Squeezin'" by Journey. The director's cut version also includes an acoustic rendition of John Denver's "Leaving on a Jet Plane". Murphy was surprised at the ease with which use of songs was approved by the record labels approached, and explained: "I think the key to it is they loved the tone of it. They loved that this show was about optimism and young kids, for the most part, reinterpreting their classics for a new audience." The score of the episode features a cappella covers of instrumental songs provided by The Swingle Singers. Dance routines were choreographed by Zach Woodlee.

Four of the songs featured in the episode were released as singles, available for digital download. "On My Own" charted at number 42 in Ireland and 73 in the UK, and "Can't Fight This Feeling" charted at number 117 in the UK. "Rehab" charted at number 93 in Australia, 38 in Ireland, 62 in the UK and 98 in America. "Don't Stop Believin'" reached number 2 in the UK, 4 in America, 50 in Canada, 5 in Australia, 4 in Ireland and 16 in New Zealand. It sold 177,000 copies in the US in its first week, and went on to sell the most copies of any Glee single: it was certified gold with 500,000 sales in the US in October 2009, and reached one million in sales and platinum certification in March 2011; it has also been certified platinum in Australia.

=== Casting ===
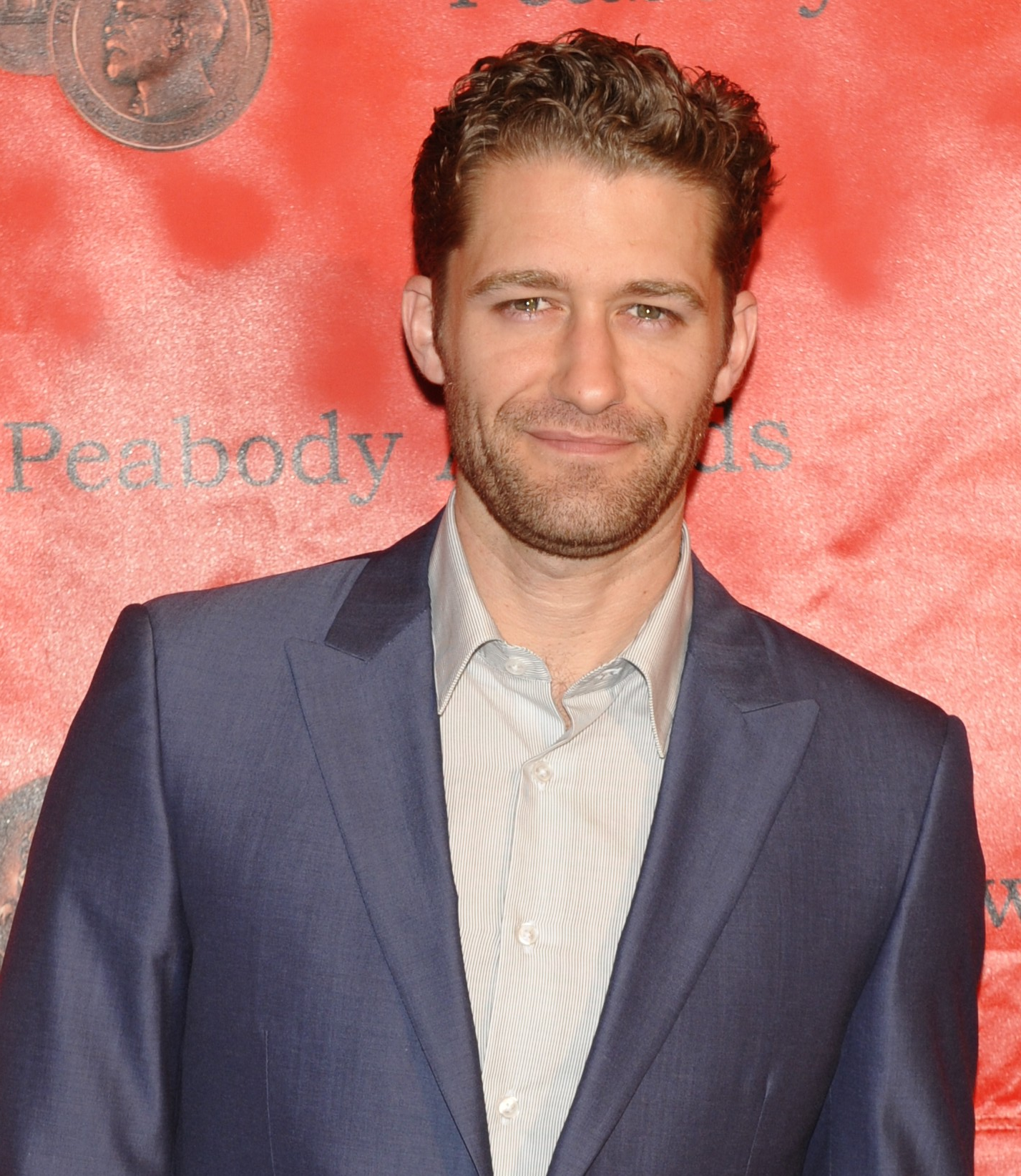
Matthew Morrison was cast after Murphy spent three months observing actors on Broadway.

In casting Glee, Murphy sought out actors who could identify with the rush of starring in theatrical roles. Instead of using traditional network casting calls, he spent three months on Broadway, where he found Morrison, who had previously starred on stage in Hairspray and The Light in the Piazza, Michele, who starred in Spring Awakening, and Ushkowitz, from the Broadway revival of The King and I. The role of Rachel was written specifically for Michele. Colfer had no previous professional experience, but reminded Ryan of the character of Kurt from The Sound of Music, and was thus cast as Kurt Hummel. He originally auditioned for Artie with the song "Mr. Cellophane", however Murphy was so impressed by his performance that the role of Kurt was created for him. Colfer commented on his casting: "I'm so happy to be a part of something that is so new and different and so needed at this time. It's good to have something positive, especially for kids in small towns, like myself, who need a little pick-me-up. It's true: You can be famous – even if there's no money left in the world."

Auditioning actors with no theatrical experience were required to prove they could sing and dance as well as act. Mays auditioned with the song "Touch-a, Touch-a, Touch-a, Touch Me" from The Rocky Horror Show, while Monteith initially submitted a tape of himself acting only, and was requested to submit a second, musical tape, in which he sang "a cheesy, '80s music-video-style version" of REO Speedwagon's "Can't Fight This Feeling". Monteith has deemed his casting "spot on" as: "I'm just like my character. I've never trained or had any lessons. I can just do it – with some adjustments, obviously." McHale came from a boy-band background, having previously been part of the group Not Like Them. He auditioned with the song "Let It Be" and tested alongside Colfer and Ushkowitz. He explained that the diversity of the cast's backgrounds reflects the range of different musical styles within the show itself: "It's a mix of everything: classic rock, current stuff, R&B. Even the musical theater stuff is switched up. You won't always recognize it." Lynch was originally intended to be a guest star, but became a series regular when a Damon Wayans pilot she was working on for ABC fell through.

== Reception ==
=== Ratings ===
Over the hour of broadcast, the first airing of the episode drew an average of 9.619 million US viewers. It began with 12.518 million, dropping after the first half-hour from first place in the ratings to third, retaining only 8.917 million viewers. The episode ranked fourteenth in the weekly program ratings, and was the fourth most viewed show on the Fox network for the week. It received a 3.9/7 rating/share in the key adults 18–49 demographic. The director's cut version of the episode attained 4.2 million viewers, and a 1.8/5 rating/share in the 18–49 demographic. The episode was the nineteenth highest viewed show in Canada for the week of broadcast, with 1.04 million viewers. It was watched by 278,000 viewers in the United Kingdom, a 1.3% audience share, and by a further 100,000 on timeshift, a 0.6% share. The director's cut was aired on January 11, 2010, followed by Showmance, and was watched by 1.76 million viewers, becoming the most-watched show on E4 for the week, and the most-watched show on cable for the week.

=== Awards and nominations ===
Following the first broadcast of the episode, Glee was nominated for three Teen Choice Awards: Choice TV: Breakout Series, Choice TV: Breakout Star Male (Cory Monteith) and Choice TV: Breakout Star Female (Lea Michele). Murphy was nominated for the 2009 Directors Guild of America Award for Outstanding Directing of a Comedy Series for his work on the episode. Robert J. Ulrich, Eric Dawson, Carol Kritzer and Jim Carnahan won an Artios Award for casting of a comedy series, Mark Hutman was nominated for the "Single Camera Television Series" Art Directors Guild Award, and David Klotz won a Golden Reel Award for "Best Sound Editing: Short Form Music in Television" for his work on the episode. At the 62nd Primetime Emmy Awards, Murphy, Falchuk and Brennan were nominated for the "Outstanding Writing for a Comedy Series" award for their work on the episode. Murphy was additionally nominated for the "Outstanding Directing for a Comedy Series" award, and Hutman, Christopher Brown and Barbara Munch were nominated for the "Outstanding Art Direction for a Single-Camera Series" award.

=== Critical reception ===
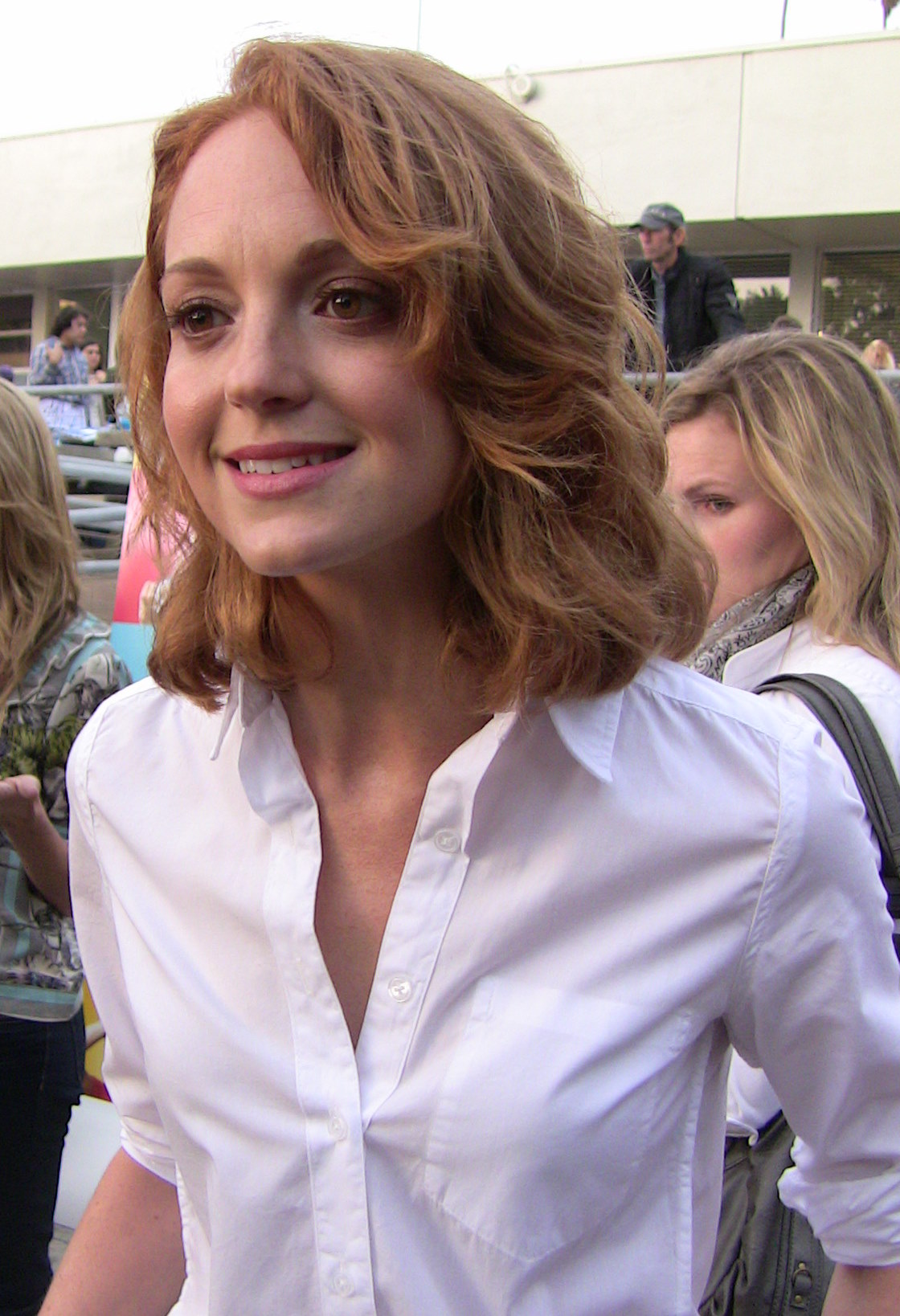
Variety's Brian Lowry believed that Mays as Emma offered "modest redemption" to an adult cast of "over-the-top buffoons".

Entertainment Weekly's Ken Tucker gave the episode an A, posing the question: "Has there ever been a TV show more aptly named than Glee? It both embodies and inspires exactly that quality." Glee was the top ranked topic on social networking site Twitter on the night of its initial airing. Alessandra Stanley for The New York Times called the show "blissfully unoriginal in a witty, imaginative way", saying the characters are "high school archetypes" but noted "a strong satiric pulse that doesn’t diminish the characters’ identities or dim the showmanship of a talented cast". The Daily News' David Hinckley wrote that the show "isn't close to perfect" but "has likable characters, a good sense of humor and a reasonably deft touch with music." He called the pilot episode "not very plausible" but "potentially heartwarming", writing of the musical choices: "The duet of "You're the One That I Want" from Grease may be a little obvious, but setting a group dance routine to Amy Winehouse's "Rehab" shows some inspiration. Whether Glee can hold that note remains a very unanswered question. But it will at least be worth watching to see." USA Today's Robert Bianco assessed: "There's a lot to like here: the exuberance of the musical numbers, the bite to the comedy and the joy of seeing something different. It has casting and tone problems, but it has all summer to fix them."

The Baltimore Sun's David Zurawik was critical of the show's characterization and comedy, but was impressed by the staging of "Don't Stop Believin'", calling it "so elevating and inspirational that it almost redeems all the stereotypes and lame humor that come before. Grit my teeth as I did at how one-dimensionally empty-headed the writing could be, I will still be back for the start of this series in the fall because of its musical punch." Tom Jicha for The Sun Sentinel similarly claimed of the episode that: "A lively score and appealing performers somewhat compensate for overly familiar characters and plotting", while Rob Owen for the Pittsburgh Post-Gazette agreed: "It's the music that makes Glee a gleeful delight. Without the song-and-dance production numbers, this Fox pilot would be just another high-school-set comedy-drama."

The Chicago Tribune's Maureen Ryan commented that: "the two biggest musical numbers are tremendously entertaining. They're shot and performed with verve, and they put to shame those medleys contestants often perform on the Wednesday edition of American Idol", but again observed: "Whether it will work as a satirical dramedy about the cutthroat social environment of high school is another matter." Of the principal cast, Ryan said: "Casting Matthew Morrison as Will Schuester [...] was a wise move; the actor not only has a sweet voice but a hangdog hopefulness that gives a needed anchor to the show's more satirical elements. Cory Monteith gives quarterback Finn Hudson a jock-ish authority mixed with an appealingly square naivete, and Lea Michele not only has an amazing voice but manages to make her character, spoiled diva Rachel Berry, more than a humorless stereotype." She was critical, however, of Gilsig as Terri, calling her "the worst thing about Glee" and opining: "As written by Murphy and played by Gilsig, the character is screechy, unfunny and deeply unpleasant. It's as if Ryan didn't trust that the audience would get behind Will and the saga of his ragtag glee club and so saw fit to give the teacher the shrewish, nagging wife from hell."

In contrast, Tom Shales for The Washington Post criticized Morrison as Will, writing: "Morrison is definitely not gleeful and doesn't seem particularly well equipped to be a high-school impresario; as pipers go, he's not even marginally pied." Shales was more positive regarding Lynch's performance, and concluded that: "Dramatic tension isn't exactly plentiful, but pleasingly staged songs and a general aura of retro ingenuousness come through, and seem awfully if fitfully refreshing". Variety's Brian Lowry also highlighted acting and characterization issues with the show, writing that: "It's among the adults, alas – who are mostly over-the-top buffoons – where Glee nearly sails off the rails, from Jane Lynch's tyrannical cheer matron to the salivating football coach, a bit like the Rydell High gang in Grease." Lowry felt that: "Modest redemption comes from the stammering Emma (Heroes' Jayma Mays), who has a clear crush on Will, even though he's married to his high-school sweetheart. Perhaps to foster a rooting interest (or at least sympathy) for a Will-Emma pairing, said wife (Jessalyn Gilsig) is initially presented as a ditsy shrew." Mary McNamara for the Los Angeles Times has called Glee: "the first show in a long time that's just plain full-throttle, no-guilty-pleasure-rationalizations-necessary fun." She praised Lynch as Sue, writing that "Lynch alone makes Glee worth watching", and claimed that overall: "The music, though by no means edgy, is energetic with a wide audience appeal, like the show itself.
