= Terri Schuester =

Fictional character from the Fox series Glee

Terri Del Monico
- Glee character
- Jessalyn Gilsig as Terri Schuester in Glee
- First appearance: "Pilot" (2009)
- Last appearance: "Dreams Come True" (2015)
- Created by: Ryan Murphy; Brad Falchuk; Ian Brennan
- Portrayed by: Jessalyn Gilsig

In-universe information
- Alias: Honey Badger
- Occupation: Retail management
- Family: Kendra Giardi (sister)
- Spouse: Will Schuester (divorced)
- Relatives: Kyle Giardi (nephew); Max Giardi (nephew); Joshua Giardi (nephew)

Terri Del Monico (formerly Schuester) is a fictional character from the Fox musical comedy-drama series Glee. The character is portrayed by actress Jessalyn Gilsig, and appeared in Glee from its pilot episode, first broadcast on May 19, 2009. Terri was developed by Glee creators Ryan Murphy, Brad Falchuk and Ian Brennan. She is introduced as the wife of glee club director Will Schuester (Matthew Morrison). Her storylines have seen her experience a false pregnancy, attempt to adopt the baby of pregnant glee club member Quinn Fabray (Dianna Agron), and become involved in a love triangle between herself, Will, and school guidance counsellor Emma Pillsbury (Jayma Mays).

Gilsig has characterized Terri as being emotionally still in high school, and lacking the skills to make her marriage work. She has explained that Terri feels threatened by her husband's commitment to the glee club, worried that it is pulling him away from her, and will stop at nothing to keep her marriage together.

Terri has been poorly received by critics. The Chicago Tribune's Maureen Ryan has called her "the worst thing about Glee", and the show's "one big flaw". Ken Tucker of Entertainment Weekly has described her as a "shrill, lying nag", whose main function is to bring the audience down. Gerrick Kennedy of the Los Angeles Times, however, has praised Gilsig's acting in the role, and stated that his hatred of the character dissipated once her fake pregnancy was exposed. He noted that: "Gilsig's superb acting isn't exactly doing anything to extinguish those flames", and while he still isn't "in full-on Team Terri uniform [...] she did at least have my attention on the sidelines, as opposed to filing my nails until halftime. Baby steps, right?"

== Storylines ==
=== Season 1 ===
Terri is the selfish wife of glee club director Will Schuester (Matthew Morrison). Believing herself to be pregnant, Terri pressures Will to quit his job as a Spanish teacher at William McKinley High School, in order to take a better paying job as an accountant. She later discovers she has actually experienced a hysterical pregnancy, but hides this from Will, afraid he will leave her. After she confides her deception in her sister Kendra (Jennifer Aspen), Terri approaches the recently revealed to be pregnant cheerleader Quinn Fabray (Dianna Agron), with an interest in her baby. Terri briefly becomes the school nurse, albeit unqualified, and uses the position to keep a closer eye on Will, whom she believes may be cheating on her with guidance counsellor Emma Pillsbury (Jayma Mays). She is fired as the nurse by Principal Figgins (Iqbal Theba), however, after it is discovered that she has given the glee club members pseudoephedrine tablets. Terri and Kendra bully her OB-GYN (Kenneth Choi) into faking an ultrasound to convince Will the baby is real. In the episode "Mattress," Will uncovers Terri's ruse when he discovers her pregnancy pad in a drawer. He angrily confronts her, then walks out, but remains undecided over whether to end their marriage. Terri begins attending therapy, but Will tells her he no longer loves her and is leaving her. Later, in "Hell-O," Terri returns to warn Emma that she is not going to give Will up without a fight, and also reveals that the song that Will planned on dancing with Emma is also the song Terri and Will had danced to at their prom. Despite this attempted sabotage, Terri and Will still finalize their divorce; Terri then briefly befriends Glee member and newly hired Finn Hudson (Cory Monteith) as her protegee at Sheets-N-Things, because he reminds her of a younger Will.

=== Season 2 ===
At the start of the second season, Terri still wants her ex-husband Will back. She is nearly run over as she confronts Will and Emma when they begin to go for a test drive in his spontaneously acquired Corvette. Terri tells Will to get out of the car and they get into an argument, which causes Emma to leave the scene. The words simmer down and Terri advises Will to return the car to the dealership, because he cannot afford it. Before leaving, she says that Emma will break Will's heart again and he'll return to her eventually. In "The Substitute", Terri returns to take care of a sick Will. They have sex, but the next day when she sees Will's substitute, Holly Holliday (Gwyneth Paltrow) at his apartment having a beer with him, she becomes suspicious and makes several snarky comments to Holly. Even after Terri apologizes, Will tells her it is over. A heartbroken Terri promises Will he will regret it, and she storms out of the door. In the episode "A Night of Neglect", Sue Sylvester recruits Terri for her "League of Doom", a new group that Sue hopes will help her bring down Will and the glee club before they can compete in Nationals. In "Funeral", Terri succeeds in sabotaging the club's travel plans to New York, but fixes the damage and tells Will that she has been promoted to manager for Sheets-N-Things at a location in Miami. She plans to take the job as a chance to move on with her life and give herself a fresh start in a new location.

=== Season 4 ===
In Season 4's Christmas episode "Glee, Actually", Terri made a cameo appearance in Artie Abrams's (Kevin McHale) dream sequence, where she successfully did her false pregnancy and Will, who is an alcoholic, is too drunk to recognize that the baby Terri is carrying is a baby doll. She also tells Artie that Emma and Ken are married and living in Hawaii.

=== Season 6 ===
Terri appears in the first part of the series finale, "2009", which is a parallel episode to the pilot. She is not happy that Will takes over the Glee Club and rudely dismiss Rachel Berry's (Lea Michele) request to convince Will to stay for the newly reformed Glee Club, as Terri wants Will to get a better job for a better living, ignoring his dreams. In the series finale "Dreams Come True", during the last moments of the series, Terri returns to Lima for the first time since season 2. She joins in to attend a rededication to the McKinley's auditorium to the late Finn Hudson and enjoys the final performance by the New Directions of all generation. She reunites with Will and takes a bow with the rest of the Glee cast.

== Development ==
=== Casting and creation ===
Terri Schuester is portrayed by actress Jessalyn Gilsig. Prior to her casting in Glee, Gilsig was an established actress in both the television and film industry, but had little theatrical experience. In casting Glee, series creator Ryan Murphy sought actors who could identify with the rush of starring in theatrical roles. For the first two seasons of Glee, Gilsig was billed as a contract player for the show. However, it was reported that Gilsig has been bumped down to a recurring character for the show's third season, set to air in September 2011.

When asked what originally drew her to the role of Terri in an interview with TheTVChick, Gilsig said: "Well, first of all, Ryan Murphy. Because I had worked with him on Nip/Tuck. And that was one of the best experiences as an actor I’ve ever had in my career. He really challenges you as an actor, and he really pushes you, and he really puts a lot of faith in actors to be able to — I think go further than they’ve ever gone before. Certainly for me on Nip/Tuck. You know, for obvious reasons…things I never thought I’d do. (laughs) But also just emotionally and character-wise and comedically. Every script was just this amazing emotional gymnastics. So that first of all: I was like great, I’d love to work with Ryan. And for me, the opportunity to do a comedy is something that I’ve been itching to do for many years now and also if I was going to do that–which is kind of a big risk for me–to be able to do that with Ryan, who I know so well, and then so much of the crew that I was familiar with from Nip/Tuck was kind of a dream scenario I would say."

=== Characterization ===
Discussing the workplace flirtation between Will and Emma, Gilsig deemed Terri "a woman of conviction", willing to do "whatever it takes" to keep Will from leaving her, "even if that means finding this woman and hunting her down". She explained that Will and Terri's communication is weak and that Terri is "missing a lot of the skills for the marriage", and commented that Terri feels threatened by Will's commitment to the glee club, worried that it will pull him away from her. Gilsig characterized Terri as emotionally still being in high school, and explained: "I think Terri still lives in that world, where I can move the pieces in such a way to create a picture, and that will make it real. I don't think she's learned that you can actually just have open conversations and talk about your fears and ask for your needs to be met in a direct, compassionate way. I think she's still in high school and thinking whatever you do, just don't let anybody know that you don't know what you're doing." Discussing Terri's relationship with her sister Kendra, Gilsig commented: "When Kendra tells Terri to do something, Terri does it. As crazy as Terri might be, she's actually pretty normal in the face of her sister. This [fake pregnancy] is Kendra's brainchild, and she just trusts her implicitly."

Gilsig referred to the confrontation between Terri and Will in the episode "Mattress" as "The Reckoning". She described it as sad to shoot, as she and Morrison were so invested in the storyline, and explained: "What I hope is conveyed is that you see the child inside Terri. You see the fear." Gilsig commented that viewers had been wondering why Will was taking so long to discover Terri was not actually pregnant: "I think people have been asking 'How slow is this guy?!'. But [in "Mattress"] Will finally reflects that he is a fully evolved human being and puts two and two together." She noted that while Will and Emma "are adorable together", she still believes in Terri and Will as a couple: "I think that she really loves him. People do crazy things out of deep, deep insecurity. She's obviously flawed, but I think she has love in her heart." Gilsig has further discussed the development of Terri's relationship with Will:

There are two facets to everybody. So for Ryan, his instructions to Matthew and I were to find the heart of this relationship. It's tarnished and malnourished but it all started somewhere. If you ask anyone about the beginning of a relationship, they always get sentimental. Terri's problem is that she keeps trying to go back to that moment in high school where it was like magic. I think she wants to live back in that place. Will's obviously matured past that point and she just has no tools to communicate those insecurities. But she does love him.

— Jessalyn Gilsig, Los Angeles Times

Overall, while fan reaction to her character had previously resulted in a backlash Gilsig found "tough", she hoped that "Mattress" would be the episode in which "anti-Terri fans joined Team Terri". Asked how she felt about Terri being a 'love to hate' character, Gilsig replied: "As long as you love to hate her, that's OK. It would be a different show if there weren't characters like Terri or Sue Sylvester (Jane Lynch), otherwise you'd be at Disneyland. It would be the happiest place on Earth." Gilsig does not know how long her character will feature in the series, and has explained "When Terri was created, she was created obviously to be an obstacle between Emma and Will. They needed an obstacle, otherwise there's no show. What's been fun about it is that she's managed to emerge as a character unto herself with her own complexities."

== Reception ==
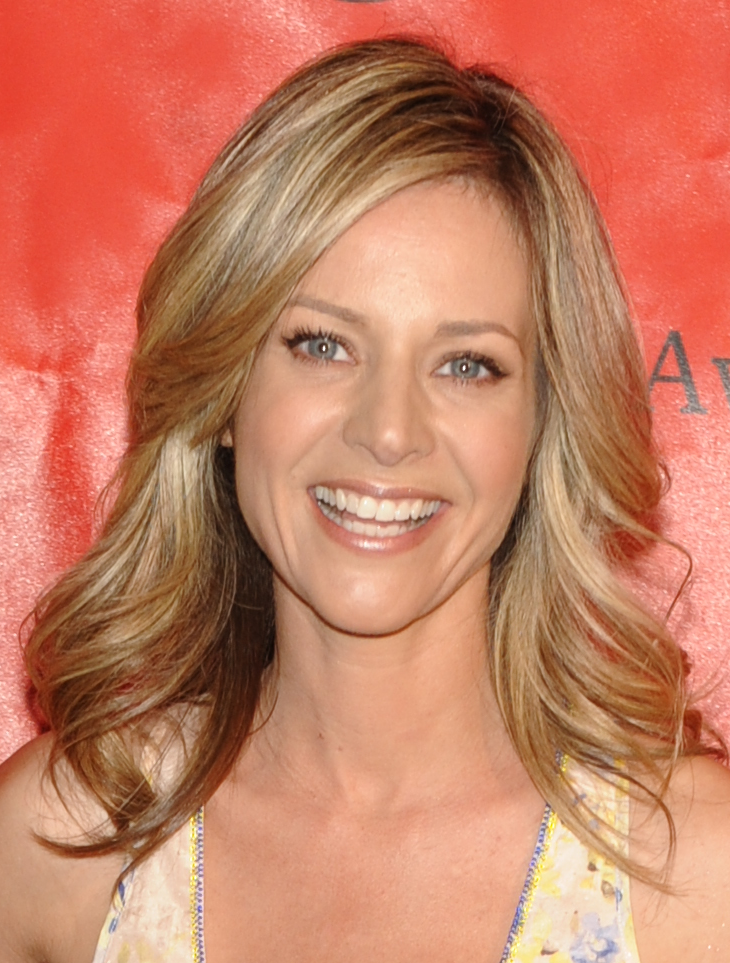
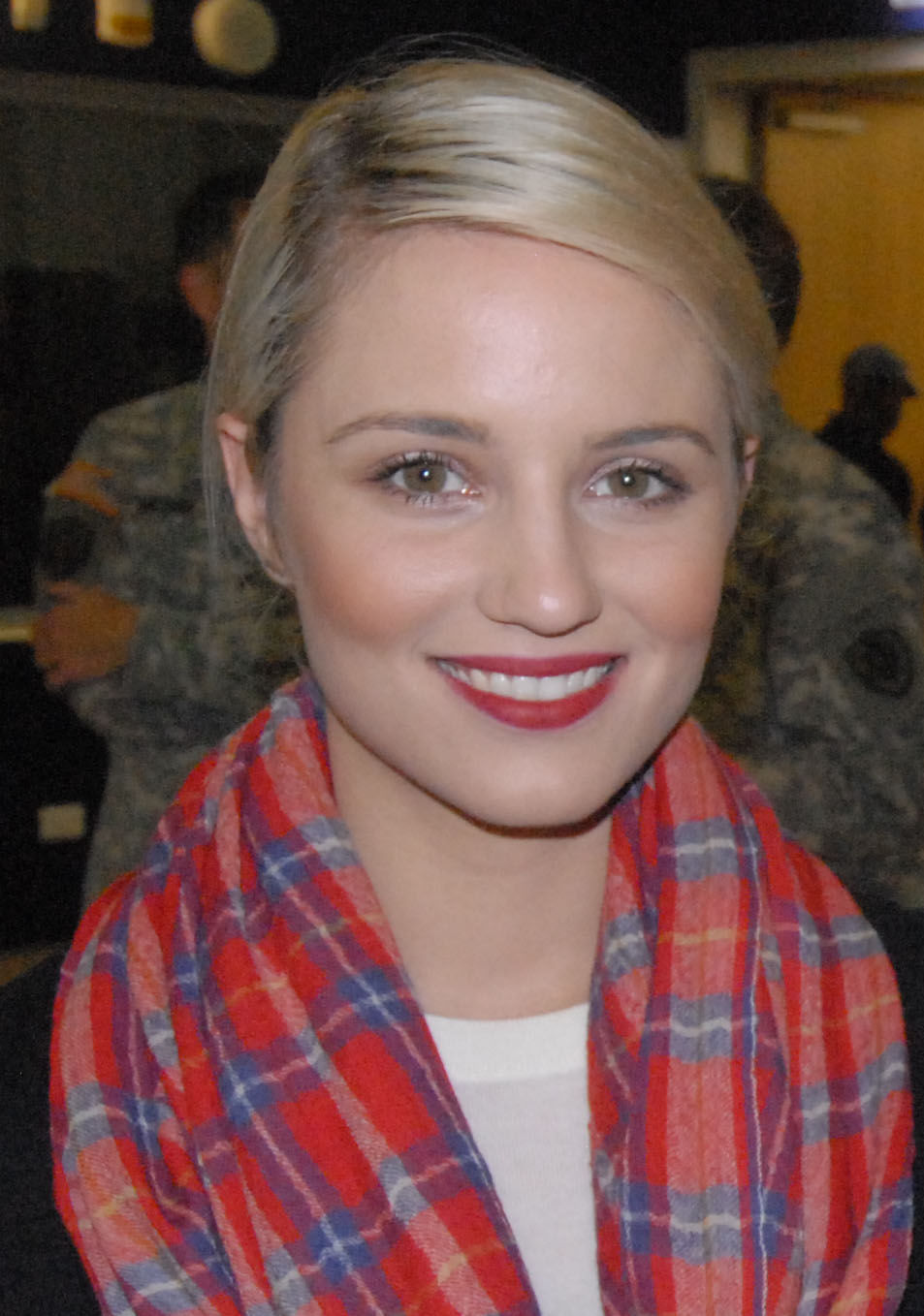
The storyline between Terri (Jessalyn Gilsig, left) and Quinn (Dianna Agron, right) was not well received by critics or viewers.

The critical reception of the character has been generally negative. Robert A. George of the New York Post has written that Glee has "the most unpleasant pack of female characters of any show in recent memory", and deemed Terri the "biggest culprit". George called Terri's hysterical pregnancy "Freudian" and wrote: "The Terri-Quinn plot sends the message that the devious gender will use every trick to lure and trap its mate — including lying about pregnancy." Variety's Brian Lowry commented: "Perhaps to foster a rooting interest (or at least sympathy) for a Will-Emma pairing, [Terri] (Jessalyn Gilsig) is initially presented as a ditsy shrew." The Chicago Tribune's Maureen Ryan has called Terri "the worst thing about Glee", and opined: "As written by Murphy and played by Gilsig, the character is screechy, unfunny and deeply unpleasant. It's as if Ryan didn't trust that the audience would get behind Will and the saga of his ragtag glee club and so saw fit to give the teacher the shrewish, nagging wife from hell." Ryan later deemed Terri the "one big flaw in Glee, commenting that she: "manages to drain all the fun out of Glee every time she appears. Not only is this shrill character intensely annoying, but she makes you wonder whether Will has brain damage. What other explanation could there be for his ending up with this materialistic harpy?". Furthermore, Terri was included in TV Guide's list of The Most Loathed TV Characters.

Robert Bianco for USA Today noted after the episode "Showmance": "Jessalyn Gilsig's self-centered, ridiculously strident Terri just needs to go, period." Shawna Malcom for the Los Angeles Times deemed Terri "beyond annoying" in the following episode, "Acafellas", but wrote: "I have confidence that creator Ryan Murphy will flesh out Jessalyn Gilsig’s character over time. Her seemingly sincere apology to Will for not being more supportive of his boy band was a nice first step." Eric Goldman for IGN commented after the episode "Preggers": "So far, Terri has been an incredibly unlikable character. More firmly establishing her as this devilish type of schemer at least pushes her far enough to make her actions entertaining, even as we root against her." Ken Tucker of Entertainment Weekly noted of the episode "Throwdown": "the pregnancy subplot is dragging down the show, and tonight that subplot nearly derailed an otherwise-excellent episode. Terri's fake pregnancy and Quinn’s real one started out a few weeks ago as an interesting way to insert some realism and tension into a delightfully surreal musical-comedy universe. By now, however, I watch Glee and feel sorry for Jessalyn Gilsig. I’ll bet the actress didn’t initially sign on to have her character Terri become a shrill, lying nag whose main function is to bring husband Will — and by extension, us — down."

Gerrick Kennedy, in a review of "Mattress" for the Los Angeles Times, noted that in previous reviews he had "never been shy of [his] disdain for Mrs. Schuester". He called her "manipulative, heartless [and] shrill", and added that "this whole train wreck of a fake pregnancy just added fuel to the fire that became a raging inferno of hate for Terri." He also noted: "Gilsig's superb acting isn't exactly doing anything to extinguish those flames", and while he still isn't "in full-on Team Terri uniform [...] she did at least have my attention on the sidelines, as opposed to filing my nails until halftime. Baby steps, right?" Kennedy praised the confrontation scene, and wrote that it was "devastating" to watch and that his hate for Terri "vanished" once the lie was over. Kennedy described:

I pitied her. I saw her for what she was: desperate, defeated, yet somehow defiant. What she did wasn’t wrong in her mind. How could it be? Glee club was ruining their marriage, making Will distant and happy. Of course the tension between Will and Emma had nothing to do with it, because Terri is undoubtedly vain enough to know she is a knockout. But she is smart enough to know that wasn’t enough to keep Will interested. After hearing her say the marriage largely worked because Will didn’t feel great about himself, watching him walk out the door was both empowering and heartbreaking. As Emma sweetly said, Will is a "lot to lose." You can't fault Terri for fighting tooth, nail and womb for him.

— Gerrick Kennedy, Los Angeles Times
