= Jessalyn Gilsig =

Canadian actress (born 1971)

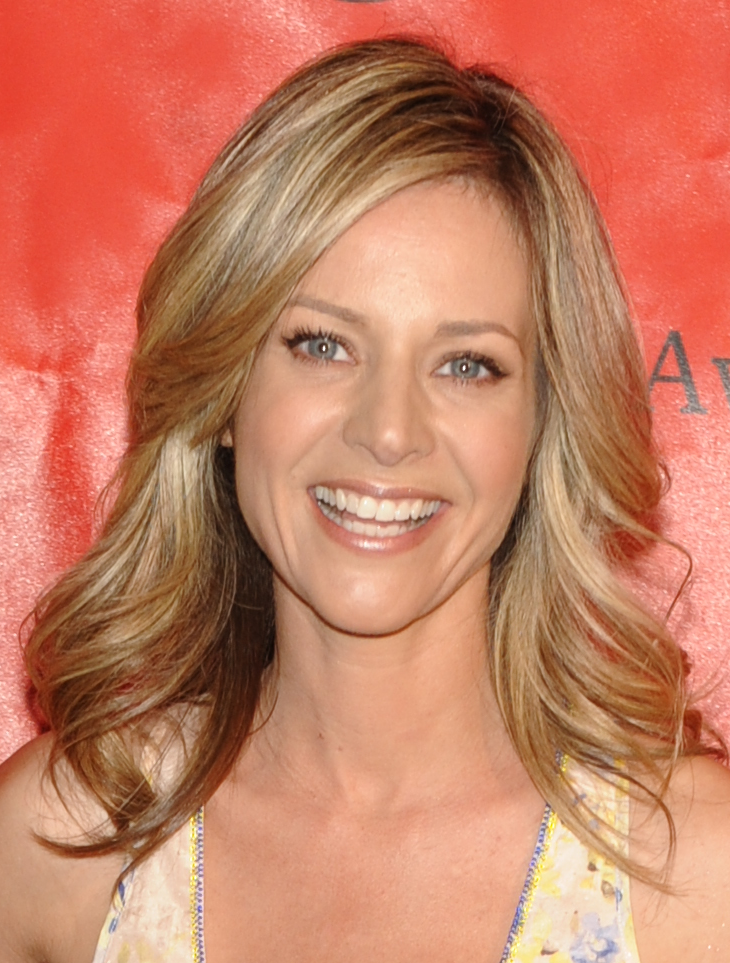
- Gilsig at the 69th Annual Peabody Awards in 2010
- Born: Jessalyn Sarah Gilsig; November 30, 1971 (age 54); Montreal, Quebec, Canada
- Education: McGill University (BA); Harvard University (MFA)
- Occupation: Actress
- Years active: 1984–present
- Known for: Boston Public; Glee; Vikings; Quest for Camelot
- Spouse: Bobby Salomon (m. 2005; div. 2010)
- Children: 1
- Website: jessalyng.com

Jessalyn Sarah Gilsig (born November 30, 1971) is a Canadian actress. She is best known for her roles as Meredith Gordon in Heroes, Kayley in Quest for Camelot, Lauren Davis in Boston Public, Gina Russo in Nip/Tuck, Det. Kelly Ronson in NYPD Blue, Terri Schuester in Glee, and Siggy Haraldson in Vikings.

== Early life ==
Gilsig was born in Montreal, Quebec, Canada, the daughter of Claire, a writer and translator, and Toby Gilsig, an engineer. She began her acting in a voice work part at age 12 for a National Film Board of Canada production, Masquerade. She is of Jewish descent.

== Education ==
Gilsig attended McGill University in Montreal, from 1989 to 1993, graduating with a Bachelor of Arts degree in English in 1993. She later pursued her acting studies further at Harvard University's Institute for Advanced Theater Training.

== Career ==
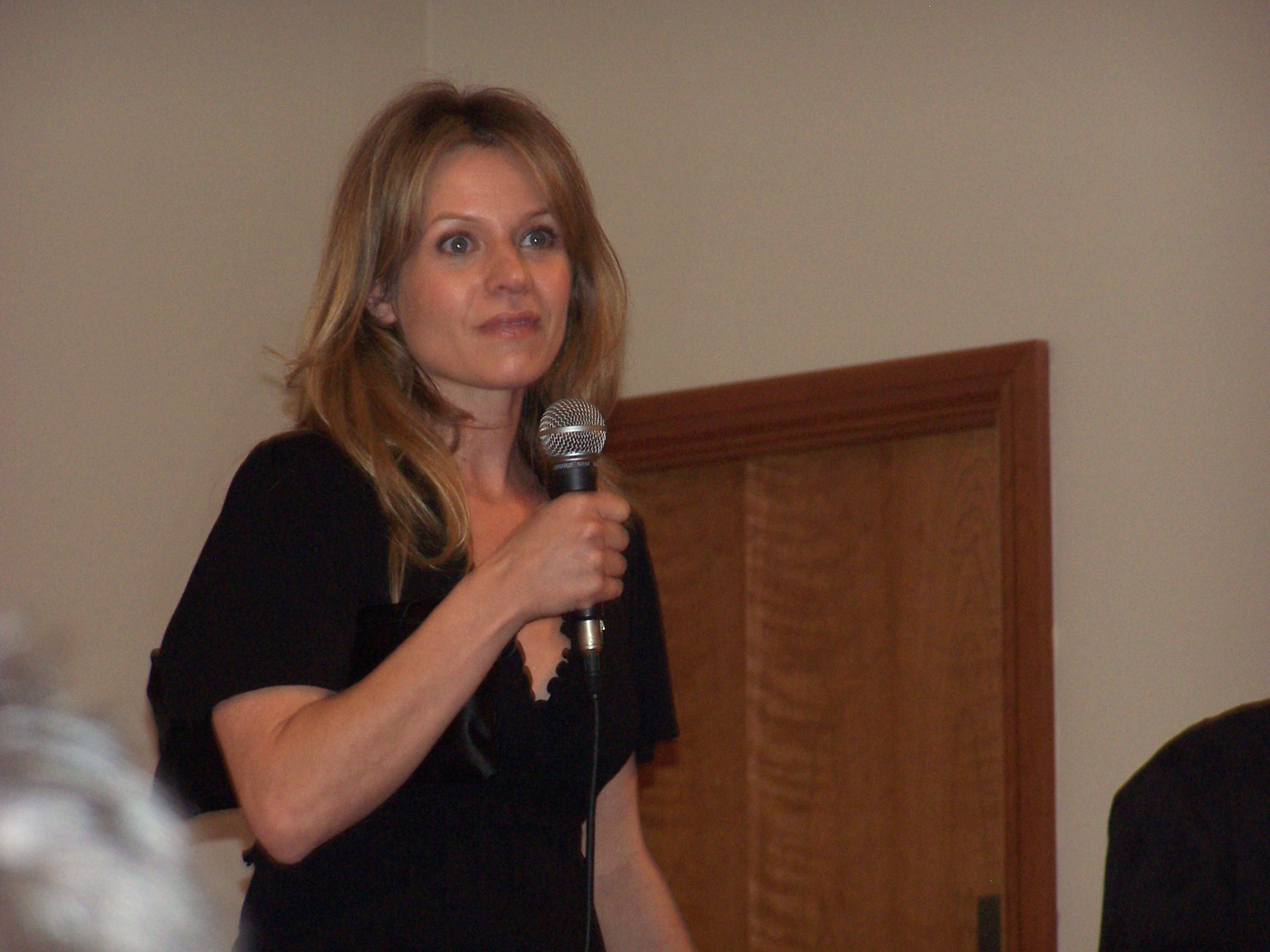
Gilsig at an appearance in England 2008

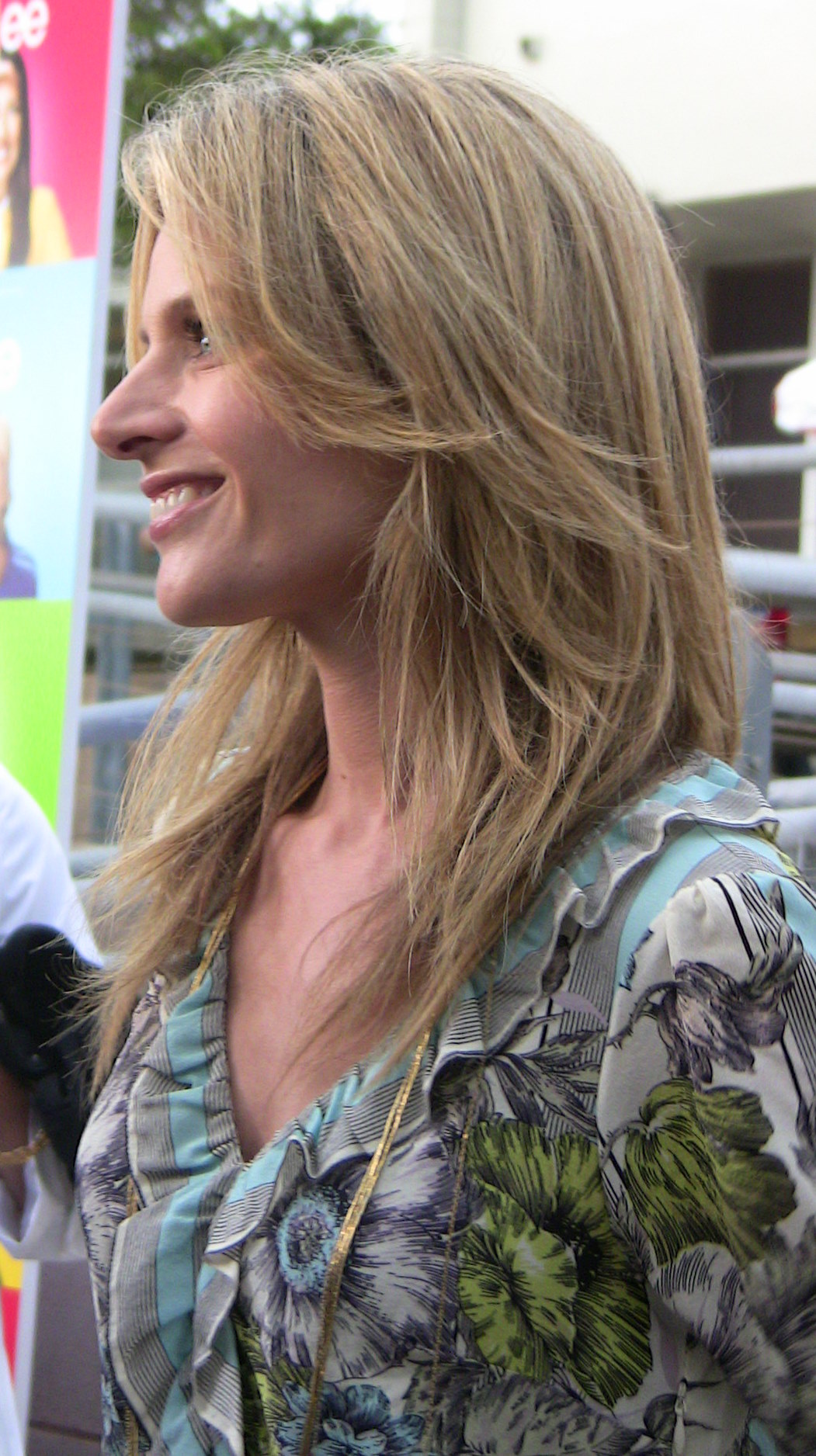
Jessalyn Gilsig at premiere party of TV series, Glee, Santa Monica, California on May 11, 2009

Gilsig began her career as a voice actress. She has done voices in the films such as Masquerade, and for television series such as Young Robin Hood.

She moved to New York City in 1995 where she appeared in several off-Broadway plays. However, it was her association with David E. Kelley that led to her starring role in Boston Public.

After guest-starring in two episodes of Kelley's The Practice, Gilsig was cast in two episodes of another Kelley program, the short-lived Snoops. Although the series was cancelled before Gilsig's episodes were broadcast, Kelley wrote the part of Lauren Davis in Boston Public specifically for her, a series that premiered in September 2000 on FOX; Gilsig would leave the series after the end of the second season in May 2002.

Following her departure from Boston Public, Gilsig joined the cast of Nip/Tuck in 2003 as Gina Russo, a role she continued until 2008. In 2004, she appeared in five episodes of NYPD Blue, followed by four episodes of FOX's Prison Break in 2005.

In addition to her extensive credits in television and theatre, Gilsig has appeared in film, beginning with a small role in the 1998 film The Horse Whisperer. She then provided the speaking voice for Kayley in the animated film Quest for Camelot (1998), with Andrea Corr performing the character's songs. In 2004 she starred in Chicks with Sticks, appeared in See This Movie, and in one of the lead roles in the 2007 film Flood.

In 2007–2008 she had recurring roles in two television series, playing Shelley, the sister of Tami Taylor, on NBC's Friday Night Lights, and Claire Bennet's biological mother, Meredith Gordon, on Heroes. Gilsig went on to play the main role of Terri Schuester on the Fox show, Glee, from 2009 to 2012.

In 2013, Gilsig was a series regular, portraying Siggy Haraldson, wife of Earl Haraldson and paramour of Ragnar Lothbrok's brother, Rollo, on the History Channel series Vikings until 2015. In 2017 she joined the cast of Scandal.

On January 24, 2020, Gilsig joined the cast of the Disney+ sports comedy-drama series Big Shot as Holly Barrett with John Stamos to replace Shiri Appleby.

== Personal life ==
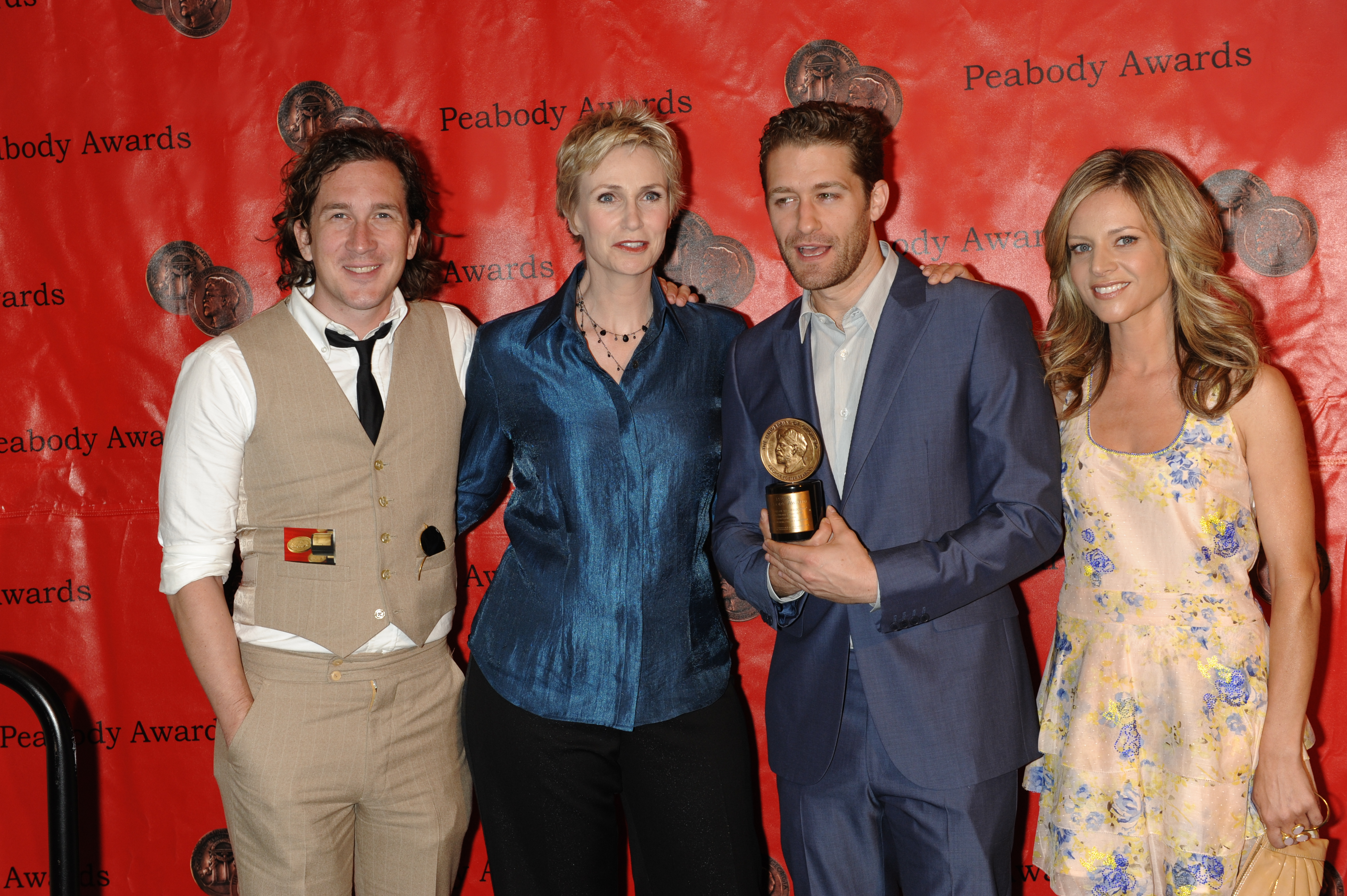
Ian Brennan, Jane Lynch, Matthew Morrison and Gilsig at Waldorf Astoria New York May 17, 2010

Gilsig met and briefly dated Bobby Salomon as a high school student – he was the football team quarterback she described as a "cool guy". Salomon, a film producer, moved to Hollywood in 2002, and the two began dating again. They were married on January 1, 2005, in a traditional Jewish wedding (Gilsig's father is Jewish). Gilsig and Salomon have a daughter.

Gilsig filed for divorce from Salomon on September 8, 2010, citing irreconcilable differences, having been separated since 2009. In 2013, Gilsig became an American citizen.

== Filmography ==
=== Film ===
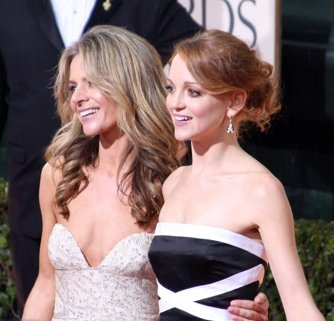
Jessalyn Gilsig and Jayma Mays at the Golden Globe Awards, January 17, 2010

List of film credits
Year	Title	Role	Notes
1984	Masquerade	(voice)	Short film
1989	The Journey Home	Jeannie	Short film
1989	Jacknife	His Girlfriend	
1998	The Horse Whisperer	Lucy	
1998	Quest for Camelot	Kayley	Voice
2004	Chicks with Sticks	Paula Taymore	
2004	See This Movie	Annie Nicole	
2007	Flood	Sam Morrison	
2008	Prom Night	Aunt Karen Turner	
2009	The Stepfather	Julie King	
2011	About Fifty	Jessica	
2013	Somewhere Slow	Anna Thompson	
2020	Spree	Andrea	

=== Television ===
List of television credits
Year	Title	Role	Notes
1988	The Little Flying Bears	Tina	Voice
1991–1992	Young Robin Hood	Gertrude of Griswald	Voice; 26 episodes
1992	Saban's Gulliver's Travels	Folia	Voice
1998	To Have & to Hold	Paula	Episode: "Stuck in the Blizzard with You"
1998	Viper	Alyssa	Episode: "Family Matters"
1999	Seven Days	Carla Boyles	Episode: "Last Card Up"
1999	The Sentinel	RJ Shannon	Episode: "The Real Deal"
1999	A Cooler Climate	Callie	Television film
1999	The Practice	ADA Jennifer	2 episodes
2000	Snoops	Suzanne Shivers	2 episodes
2000–2002	Boston Public	Lauren Davis	44 episodes
2002	Haunted	Elise Martin	Episode: "Three Hour Tour"
2003	Without a Trace	Whitney Ridder	Episode: "Confidence"
2003–2008	Nip/Tuck	Gina Russo	Seasons 1–2 – Recurring; Season 3 – Series regular; Seasons 4–5 – Guest star
2004	NYPD Blue	Det. Kelly Ronson	5 episodes
2005	Fathers and Sons	Dianne (uncredited)	Television film
2005	Prison Break	Lisa Rix	4 episodes
2006	Law & Order	Angela Burquette	Episode: "Heart of Darkness"
2007	Backyards & Bullets	Eileen	Television film
2007	Destination: Infestation	Dr. Carolyn Ross	Television film
2007–2008	Friday Night Lights	Shelley Hayes	6 episodes
2007–2008	Heroes	Meredith Gordon	10 episodes
2008	The Apostles	Christine Rydell	Television film
2008	CSI: NY	Jordan Gates	3 episodes
2008	XIII	Kim Rowland	TV miniseries
2008–2009	Imaginary Bitches	Jessalyn	Episode: "A New Leper in the Colony"; "Three Bitches Is an Imaginary Crowd (Part Two)"; "Bitches Emmy Special"
2009–2012; 2015	Glee	Terri Schuester	Seasons 1–2 – Series Regular; Season 4,6 – Guest Star (3 episodes, "Glee, Actually" & "2009" & "Dreams Come True")
2012	Smart Cookies	Julie Sterling	Television film
2013–2015	Vikings	Siggy	Main cast (seasons 1–3); Nominated – Golden Maple Award for Best Actress in a TV series broadcast in the U.S (2015)
2013	The Good Wife	Janie Ludwig	Episode: "Invitation to an Inquest"
2014	Angels and Ornaments	Corrine Nelson	Television film
2015	Evil Men	Adela	Television film
2016	Scandal	Vanessa Moss	5 episodes
2018	The Sweetheart	Samantha	Television film
2019	Grand Hotel	Roxanne	Episode: "A Perfect Storm"
2021–2022	Big Shot	Holly Barrett	Main role
2023	1923	Beverly Strafford	Episode: "War and the Turquoise Tide"
2025	Chicago Med	Ainsley Towne	Episode "Down in a Hole"

== Awards and nominations ==
List of awards and nominations received by Jessaly Gilsig
Year	Award	Category	Nominated work	Result	Ref.
2008	Shanghai International TV Festival Magnolia Award	Best Performance by an Actress in a Television Film	Flood	Nominated	
2009	36th Daytime Emmy Awards	New Approaches – Daytime Entertainment	Imaginary Bitches	Nominated	
2010	16th Screen Actors Guild Awards	Screen Actors Guild Award for Outstanding Performance by an Ensemble in a Comedy Series	Glee	Won	
2010	Teen Choice Awards	Most Fanatic Fans	Glee	Nominated	
2010	Gold Derby Awards	Ensemble of the Year	Glee	Nominated	
2013	Brooklyn Film Festival	Best Narrative Feature	Somewhere Slow	Won	
2015	Golden Maple Awards	Best Actress in a TV Series Broadcasted in the US	Vikings	Nominated	
