= List of songs in Glee season 1 =

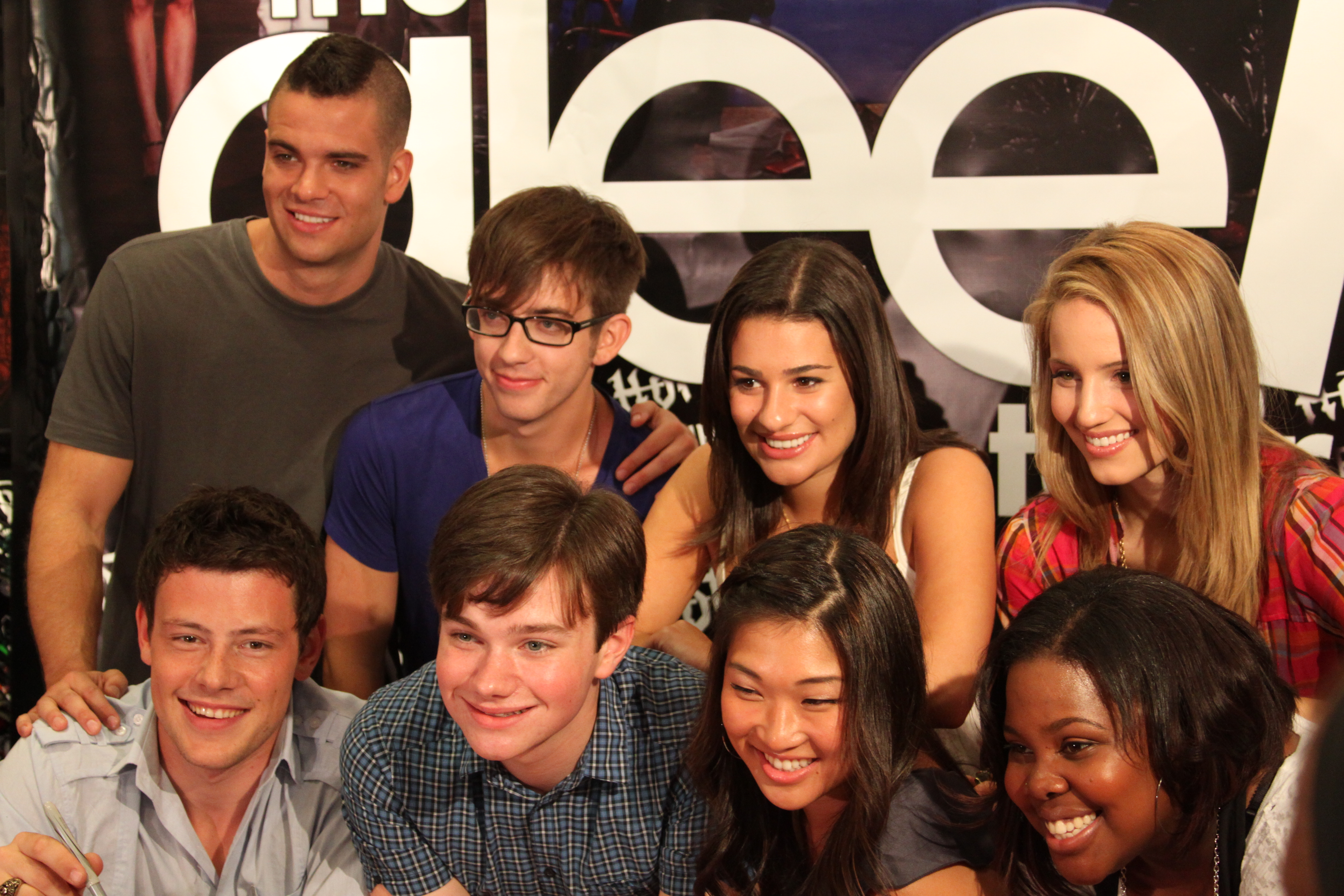
Glee cast members (clockwise from back left): Mark Salling, Kevin McHale, Lea Michele, Dianna Agron, Amber Riley, Jenna Ushkowitz, Chris Colfer and Cory Monteith

Glee is an American musical comedy-drama television series that aired on the Fox network in the United States. It focuses on the William McKinley High School glee club New Directions competing on the show choir competition circuit, while its members deal with relationships, sexuality and social issues. The show was created by Ryan Murphy, Brad Falchuk and Ian Brennan, and features many cover versions of songs performed on-screen by the characters. Murphy is responsible for selecting all of the songs used, and strives to maintain a balance between show tunes and chart hits, as he wants there to be "something for everybody in every episode". Once Murphy selects a song, rights are cleared with its publishers by music supervisor P.J. Bloom, and music producer Adam Anders rearranges it for the Glee cast. Numbers are pre-recorded by the cast, while choreographer Zach Woodlee constructs the accompanying dance moves, which are then taught to the cast and filmed. Studio recordings of tracks are then made. The process begins six to eight weeks before each episode is filmed, and can end as late as the day before filming begins.

At the beginning of the season, Murphy intended for the performances to remain reality-based, as opposed to having the characters spontaneously burst into song. As the season progressed, however, Glee began to utilize fantasy sequences, with paraplegic character Artie imagining himself dancing to "The Safety Dance", and six separate characters performing a fantasy version of "Like a Virgin". The first thirteen episodes of the season averaged five songs per episode. For the final nine episodes, the number of performances increased to eight. The list below contains all 132 musical performances of the first season, with each performance delivering an individual song or a mashup of two or more songs in a single performance.

Murphy was surprised at the ease with which use of songs was approved by the record labels approached. Recording artist Rihanna offered her single "Take a Bow" for use at a reduced licensing rate, and other artists offered use of their songs free. Madonna granted the show rights to her entire catalog, and the 2010 episode "The Power of Madonna" featured cover versions of eight of her songs. A series of Glee albums were released through Columbia Records. Accompanying the first season were the studio albums Glee: The Music, Volume 1, Glee: The Music, Volume 2 and Glee: The Music, Volume 3 Showstoppers, extended plays (EP) Glee: The Music, The Power of Madonna and Glee: The Music, Journey to Regionals, and the compilation album Glee: The Music, The Complete Season One, featuring 100 recordings from the season. Songs featured on the show are available for digital download through the iTunes Store up to two weeks before new episodes air, and through other digital outlets and mobile carriers a week later.

== Performers ==
The majority of songs are performed by New Directions, which is composed of Artie Abrams (Kevin McHale), Rachel Berry (Lea Michele), Mike Chang (Harry Shum, Jr.), Tina Cohen-Chang (Jenna Ushkowitz), Quinn Fabray (Dianna Agron), Finn Hudson (Cory Monteith), Kurt Hummel (Chris Colfer), Mercedes Jones (Amber Riley), Santana Lopez (Naya Rivera), Brittany Pierce (Heather Morris), Noah "Puck" Puckerman (Mark Salling) and Matt Rutherford (Dijon Talton). Club director Will Schuester (Matthew Morrison) also performs several songs. The season features some performances by rival glee clubs Vocal Adrenaline, which is sometimes led by Jesse St. James (Jonathan Groff), Jane Addams Girls Choir, Haverbrook Deaf Choir and Aural Intensity, as well as McKinley High's cheerleaders, the Cheerios, and the football team.

Guest stars who gave vocal performances during the season were Ben Bledsoe as former glee club member Hank Saunders, Jerry Phillips as a younger Finn, and Aaron Hendry as Darren in the pilot episode, Kristin Chenoweth and Neil Patrick Harris as former glee club members April Rhodes and Bryan Ryan, Zack Weinstein as Sean Fretthold, Olivia Newton-John as herself, Wendy Worthington as an auditionee for Les Misérables in "Dream On", and Idina Menzel as Vocal Adrenaline director Shelby Corcoran.

Songs included on the three soundtrack albums accompanying the season feature additional vocals by non-cast members. Adam Anders, Kamari Copeland, Tim Davis, Emily Gomez, David Loucks, Chris Mann and Windy Wagner appear on all three albums, as does Nikki Anders, née Hassman, who is credited as Hassman on the first two and Anders on the third; Zac Poor sings on the second and third albums. Jasper Randall appears on Glee: The Music, Volume 1, and David Baloche, Jenny Karr, Kerri Larson and Tiffany Palmer feature on Glee: The Music, Volume 2. Glee: The Music, Volume 3 Showstoppers features additional vocals by Kala Balch, David Baloche, Colin Benward, Ravaughn Brown, Storm Lee, Chaz Mason, Jeanette Olsen, Jimmy Andrew Richard, Drew Ryan Scott, Shelley Scarr and Onitsha Shaw. While recurring cast members Morris, Rivera, Shum, Jr., and Talton perform in the group numbers on screen, only Rivera is credited with performing vocally on any soundtrack albums or EPs, gaining her first solo part on "Like a Virgin" in the episode "The Power of Madonna", and appearing on Glee: The Music, Volume 3 Showstoppers as well as the two EPs, Glee: The Music, The Power of Madonna and Glee: The Music, Journey to Regionals.

== Songs ==
List of songs in Glee season one
Title	Version covered	Performed by	Episode	Single	Album (Note: All soundtrack album and EP tracks are also included on the compilation album Glee: The Music, The Complete Season One. All except the Volume 1 bonus tracks, Love Songs EP tracks and "On My Own" are compiled on the Australian Glee: The Music, The Complete Season One CD Collection.)	Ref.
"Where Is Love?"	Oliver!	Hank Saunders and Sandy Ryerson	1. "Pilot"	No	—N/a	
"Respect"	Aretha Franklin	Mercedes Jones	1. "Pilot"	No	—N/a	
"Mister Cellophane"	Chicago	Kurt Hummel	1. "Pilot"	No	—N/a	
"I Kissed a Girl"	Katy Perry	Tina Cohen-Chang	1. "Pilot"	No	—N/a	
"On My Own"	Les Misérables	Rachel Berry	1. "Pilot"	Yes	The Complete Season One	
"Sit Down, You're Rockin' the Boat"	Guys and Dolls	Artie Abrams with New Directions	1. "Pilot"	No	—N/a	
"Can't Fight This Feeling"	REO Speedwagon	Finn Hudson	1. "Pilot"	Yes	Volume 1	
"Lovin', Touchin', Squeezin'"	Journey	Young Finn Hudson and Darren	1. "Pilot"	No	—N/a	
"You're the One That I Want"	Grease	Rachel Berry and Finn Hudson with New Directions	1. "Pilot"	No	—N/a	
"Rehab"	Amy Winehouse	Vocal Adrenaline	1. "Pilot"	Yes	The Complete Season One	
"Leaving on a Jet Plane" (Note: Glee: The Music, Volume 1 bonus tracks.)	John Denver	Will Schuester	1. "Pilot" (Directors cut only)	Yes	Volume 1	
"That's the Way (I Like It)"	KC and the Sunshine Band	McKinley High Glee Club – 1993	1. "Pilot"	No	—N/a	
"(Shake, Shake, Shake) Shake Your Booty"	KC and the Sunshine Band	McKinley High Glee Club – 1993	1. "Pilot"	No	—N/a	
"Don't Stop Believin'"	Journey	Rachel Berry and Finn Hudson with New Directions	1. "Pilot"	Yes	Volume 1	
"Le Freak"	Chic	New Directions	2. "Showmance"	No	—N/a	
"Gold Digger"	Kanye West feat. Jamie Foxx	Will Schuester, Mercedes Jones and Artie Abrams with New Directions	2. "Showmance"	Yes	Volume 1	
"All by Myself"	Eric Carmen	Emma Pillsbury	2. "Showmance"	No	—N/a	
"Push It"	Salt-n-Pepa	New Directions	2. "Showmance"	Yes	The Complete Season One	
"I Say a Little Prayer"	Dionne Warwick	Quinn Fabray with Santana Lopez and Brittany Pierce	2. "Showmance"	Yes	Volume 1	
"Take a Bow"	Rihanna	Rachel Berry with Mercedes Jones and Tina Cohen-Chang	2. "Showmance"	Yes	Volume 1	
"For He's a Jolly Good Fellow"	Anon	Acafellas	3. "Acafellas"	No	—N/a	
"This Is How We Do It"	Montell Jordan	Acafellas	3. "Acafellas"	No	—N/a	
"Poison"	Bell Biv DeVoe	Acafellas	3. "Acafellas"	No	—N/a	
"Mercy"	Duffy	Vocal Adrenaline	3. "Acafellas"	Yes	The Complete Season One	
"La Camisa Negra"	Juanes	Noah Puckerman (instrumental version only)	3. "Acafellas"	No	—N/a	
"Bust Your Windows"	Jazmine Sullivan	Mercedes Jones	3. "Acafellas"	Yes	Volume 1	
"I Wanna Sex You Up"	Color Me Badd	Acafellas	3. "Acafellas"	Yes	Volume 1	
"Single Ladies (Put a Ring on It)" (Note: Dance performances.)	Beyoncé	Kurt Hummel with Tina Cohen-Chang and Brittany Pierce; McKinley High football team	4. "Preggers"	No	—N/a	
"Taking Chances"	Céline Dion	Rachel Berry	4. "Preggers"	Yes	Volume 1	
"Tonight"	West Side Story	Tina Cohen-Chang	4. "Preggers"	No	—N/a	
"Don't Stop Believin'"	Journey	Quinn Fabray and Finn Hudson with New Directions	5. "The Rhodes Not Taken"	No	—N/a	
"Maybe This Time"	Cabaret	April Rhodes and Rachel Berry	5. "The Rhodes Not Taken"	Yes	Volume 1	
"Cabaret"	Cabaret	Rachel Berry	5. "The Rhodes Not Taken"	No	—N/a	
"Alone"	Heart	April Rhodes and Will Schuester	5. "The Rhodes Not Taken"	Yes	Volume 1	
"Last Name"	Carrie Underwood	April Rhodes and New Directions	5. "The Rhodes Not Taken"	Yes	The Complete Season One	
"Somebody to Love"	Queen	New Directions	5. "The Rhodes Not Taken"	Yes	Volume 1	
"It's My Life/Confessions Part II"	Bon Jovi / Usher	New Directions males	6. "Vitamin D"	Yes	The Complete Season One	
"Halo/Walking on Sunshine"	Beyoncé / Katrina and the Waves	New Directions females	6. "Vitamin D"	Yes	The Complete Season One	
"Hate on Me"	Jill Scott	Mercedes Jones, Tina Cohen-Chang and New Directions: Sue's Kids	7. "Throwdown"	Yes	Volume 1	
"Ride wit Me"	Nelly feat. City Spud	New Directions	7. "Throwdown"	No	—N/a	
"No Air"	Jordin Sparks and Chris Brown	Rachel Berry and Finn Hudson with New Directions	7. "Throwdown"	Yes	Volume 1	
"You Keep Me Hangin' On"	The Supremes	Quinn Fabray	7. "Throwdown"	Yes	Volume 1	
"Keep Holding On"	Avril Lavigne	New Directions	7. "Throwdown"	Yes	Volume 1	
"Bust a Move"	Young MC	Will Schuester and New Directions	8. "Mash-Up"	Yes	Volume 1	
"Thong Song"	Sisqó	Will Schuester	8. "Mash-Up"	Yes	The Complete Season One	
"What a Girl Wants"	Christina Aguilera	Rachel Berry	8. "Mash-Up"	No	—N/a	
"Sweet Caroline"	Neil Diamond	Noah Puckerman with New Directions	8. "Mash-Up"	Yes	Volume 1	
"Sing, Sing, Sing (With a Swing)"	Louis Prima	Sue Sylvester and Will Schuester	8. "Mash-Up"	No	—N/a	
"I Could Have Danced All Night"	My Fair Lady	Emma Pillsbury	8. "Mash-Up"	Yes	Volume 1	
"Dancing with Myself"	Generation X	Artie Abrams	9. "Wheels"	Yes	Volume 1	
"Defying Gravity"	Wicked	Kurt Hummel and Rachel Berry	9. "Wheels"	Yes	Volume 1	
"Proud Mary"	Ike and Tina Turner	New Directions	9. "Wheels"	Yes	Volume 2	
"Endless Love"	Lionel Richie and Diana Ross	Rachel Berry and Will Schuester	10. "Ballad"	Yes	Volume 2	
"I'll Stand by You"	The Pretenders	Finn Hudson	10. "Ballad"	Yes	Volume 2	
"Don't Stand So Close to Me"/ "Young Girl"	The Police / Gary Puckett & The Union Gap	Will Schuester	10. "Ballad"	Yes	Volume 2	
"Crush"	Jennifer Paige	Rachel Berry	10. "Ballad"	Yes	Volume 2	
"(You're) Having My Baby"	Paul Anka and Odia Coates	Finn Hudson	10. "Ballad"	Yes	Volume 2	
"Lean on Me"	Bill Withers	New Directions	10. "Ballad"	Yes	Volume 2	
"Bootylicious"	Destiny's Child	Jane Addams Girls Choir	11. "Hairography"	Yes	The Complete Season One	
"Don't Make Me Over"	Dionne Warwick	Mercedes Jones	11. "Hairography"	Yes	Volume 2	
"You're the One That I Want"	Grease	Rachel Berry and Finn Hudson	11. "Hairography"	No	—N/a	
"Papa Don't Preach"	Madonna	Quinn Fabray	11. "Hairography"	Yes	The Complete Season One	
"Crazy in Love/Hair"	Beyoncé feat. Jay-Z / Hair	New Directions	11. "Hairography"	Yes	The Complete Season One	
"Imagine"	John Lennon	Haverbrook Deaf Choir and New Directions	11. "Hairography"	Yes	Volume 2	
"True Colors"	Cyndi Lauper	Tina Cohen-Chang and New Directions	11. "Hairography"	Yes	Volume 2	
"Smile"	Lily Allen	Rachel Berry and Finn Hudson	12. "Mattress"	Yes	Volume 2	
"When You're Smiling"	Louis Armstrong	Rachel Berry	12. "Mattress"	No	—N/a	
"Jump"	Van Halen	New Directions	12. "Mattress"	Yes	Volume 2	
"Smile"	Nat King Cole	New Directions	12. "Mattress"	Yes	Volume 2	
"And I Am Telling You I'm Not Going"	Dreamgirls	Mercedes Jones	13. "Sectionals"	Yes	Volume 2	
"And I Am Telling You I'm Not Going"	Dreamgirls	Jane Addams Girls Choir	13. "Sectionals"	No	—N/a	
"Proud Mary"	Ike and Tina Turner	Jane Addams Girls Choir	13. "Sectionals"	No	—N/a	
"Don't Stop Believin'"	Journey	Haverbrook Deaf Choir	13. "Sectionals"	No	—N/a	
"Don't Rain on My Parade"	Funny Girl	Rachel Berry	13. "Sectionals"	Yes	Volume 2	
"You Can't Always Get What You Want"	The Rolling Stones	New Directions	13. "Sectionals"	Yes	Volume 2	
"My Life Would Suck Without You"	Kelly Clarkson	New Directions	13. "Sectionals"	Yes	Volume 2	
"Hello, I Love You"	The Doors	Finn Hudson	14. "Hell-O"	Yes	Love Songs	
"Gives You Hell"	The All-American Rejects	Rachel Berry and New Directions	14. "Hell-O"	Yes	Volume 3 Showstoppers	
"Hello"	Lionel Richie	Rachel Berry and Jesse St. James	14. "Hell-O"	Yes	Volume 3 Showstoppers	
"Hello Again"	Neil Diamond	Will Schuester	14. "Hell-O"	No	—N/a	
"Highway to Hell"	AC/DC	Vocal Adrenaline	14. "Hell-O"	Yes	The Complete Season One	
"Hello, Goodbye"	The Beatles	New Directions	14. "Hell-O"	Yes	Volume 3 Showstoppers	
"Ray of Light"	Madonna	McKinley High Cheerios	15. "The Power of Madonna"	No	—N/a	
"Express Yourself"	Madonna	New Directions females	15. "The Power of Madonna"	Yes	The Power of Madonna	
"Open Your Heart/Borderline"	Madonna	Rachel Berry and Finn Hudson	15. "The Power of Madonna"	Yes	The Power of Madonna	
"Vogue"	Madonna	Sue Sylvester	15. "The Power of Madonna"	Yes	The Power of Madonna	
"Like a Virgin"	Madonna	Finn Hudson and Santana Lopez; Will Schuester and Emma Pillsbury; Rachel Berry and Jesse St. James	15. "The Power of Madonna"	Yes	The Power of Madonna	
"4 Minutes"	Madonna feat. Justin Timberlake and Timbaland	Kurt Hummel and Mercedes Jones	15. "The Power of Madonna"	Yes	The Power of Madonna	
"What It Feels Like for a Girl"	Madonna	Will Schuester and New Directions males	15. "The Power of Madonna"	Yes	The Power of Madonna	
"Like a Prayer"	Madonna	New Directions	15. "The Power of Madonna"	Yes	The Power of Madonna	
"Fire"	Bruce Springsteen	April Rhodes and Will Schuester	16. "Home"	Yes	The Complete Season One	
"A House Is Not a Home"	Dionne Warwick	Kurt Hummel with Finn Hudson	16. "Home"	Yes	Volume 3 Showstoppers	
"One Less Bell to Answer/ A House Is Not a Home"	The 5th Dimension/Dionne Warwick	April Rhodes and Will Schuester	16. "Home"	Yes	Volume 3 Showstoppers	
"Beautiful"	Christina Aguilera	Mercedes Jones and New Directions	16. "Home"	Yes	Volume 3 Showstoppers	
"Home" (Note: Only included on the deluxe edition of Glee: The Music, Volume 3 Showstoppers.)	The Wiz	April Rhodes and New Directions	16. "Home"	Yes	Volume 3 Showstoppers	
"Ice Ice Baby"	Vanilla Ice	Will Schuester and New Directions	17. "Bad Reputation"	Yes	The Complete Season One	
"U Can't Touch This"	MC Hammer	Artie Abrams, Kurt Hummel, Mercedes Jones, Tina Cohen-Chang and Brittany Pierce	17. "Bad Reputation"	Yes	The Complete Season One	
"Physical"	Olivia Newton-John	Sue Sylvester and Olivia Newton-John	17. "Bad Reputation"	Yes	Volume 3 Showstoppers	
"Run Joey Run"	David Geddes	Rachel Berry, Noah Puckerman, Jesse St. James and Finn Hudson with Santana Lopez and Brittany Pierce	17. "Bad Reputation"	Yes	The Complete Season One	
"Total Eclipse of the Heart"	Bonnie Tyler	Rachel Berry, Finn Hudson, Jesse St. James and Noah Puckerman	17. "Bad Reputation"	Yes	Volume 3 Showstoppers	
"The Climb"	Miley Cyrus	Rachel Berry	18. "Laryngitis"	No	—N/a	
"Jessie's Girl"	Rick Springfield	Finn Hudson	18. "Laryngitis"	Yes	The Complete Season One	
"The Lady Is a Tramp"	Sammy Davis, Jr.	Noah Puckerman and Mercedes Jones	18. "Laryngitis"	Yes	Volume 3 Showstoppers	
"Pink Houses"	John Mellencamp	Kurt Hummel	18. "Laryngitis"	No	—N/a	
"The Boy Is Mine"	Brandy and Monica	Mercedes Jones and Santana Lopez	18. "Laryngitis"	Yes	Love Songs	
"Rose's Turn"	Gypsy: A Musical Fable	Kurt Hummel	18. "Laryngitis"	Yes	Volume 3 Showstoppers	
"One"	U2	Rachel Berry, Sean Fretthold, Finn Hudson and New Directions	18. "Laryngitis"	Yes	Volume 3 Showstoppers	
"Daydream Believer"	The Monkees	Bryan Ryan and Kurt Hummel	19. "Dream On"	No	—N/a	
"Piano Man"	Billy Joel	Will Schuester and Bryan Ryan	19. "Dream On"	No	—N/a	
"Big Spender"	Sweet Charity	Auditioning woman	19. "Dream On"	No	—N/a	
"Dream On"	Aerosmith	Will Schuester and Bryan Ryan	19. "Dream On"	Yes	Volume 3 Showstoppers	
"The Safety Dance"	Men Without Hats	Artie Abrams	19. "Dream On"	Yes	Volume 3 Showstoppers	
"I Dreamed a Dream"	Les Misérables	Rachel Berry and Shelby Corcoran	19. "Dream On"	Yes	Volume 3 Showstoppers	
"Dream a Little Dream of Me"	The Mamas and the Papas	Artie Abrams and New Directions	19. "Dream On"	Yes	Love Songs	
"Funny Girl"	Barbra Streisand	Shelby Corcoran	20. "Theatricality"	Yes	The Complete Season One	
"Bad Romance"	Lady Gaga	New Directions females with Kurt Hummel	20. "Theatricality"	Yes	Volume 3 Showstoppers	
"Shout It Out Loud"	Kiss	New Directions males except Kurt Hummel	20. "Theatricality"	Yes	The Complete Season One	
"Beth"	Kiss	New Directions males except Kurt Hummel	20. "Theatricality"	Yes	Volume 3 Showstoppers	
"Poker Face"	Lady Gaga	Rachel Berry and Shelby Corcoran	20. "Theatricality"	Yes	Volume 3 Showstoppers	
"Another One Bites the Dust"	Queen	Vocal Adrenaline	21. "Funk"	Yes	The Complete Season One	
"Tell Me Something Good"	Rufus and Chaka Khan	Will Schuester	21. "Funk"	Yes	Love Songs	
"Loser"	Beck	Noah Puckerman, Finn Hudson, Sandy Ryerson, Howard Bamboo and Terri Schuester	21. "Funk"	Yes	Volume 3 Showstoppers	
"It's a Man's Man's Man's World"	James Brown	Quinn Fabray	21. "Funk"	Yes	The Complete Season One	
"Good Vibrations"	Marky Mark and the Funky Bunch feat. Loleatta Holloway	Noah Puckerman, Finn Hudson and Mercedes Jones	21. "Funk"	Yes	The Complete Season One	
"Give Up the Funk"	Parliament	New Directions	21. "Funk"	Yes	Volume 3 Showstoppers	
"You Raise Me Up" / "Magic"	Josh Groban / Olivia Newton-John	Aural Intensity	22. "Journey to Regionals"	No	—N/a	
"Faithfully"	Journey	Rachel Berry, Finn Hudson and New Directions	22. "Journey to Regionals"	Yes	Journey to Regionals	
"Any Way You Want It" / "Lovin', Touchin', Squeezin'"	Journey	New Directions	22. "Journey to Regionals"	Yes	Journey to Regionals	
"Don't Stop Believin'"	Journey	New Directions	22. "Journey to Regionals"	Yes	Journey to Regionals	
"Bohemian Rhapsody"	Queen	Vocal Adrenaline	22. "Journey to Regionals"	Yes	Journey to Regionals	
"To Sir, with Love"	Lulu	New Directions	22. "Journey to Regionals"	Yes	Journey to Regionals	
"Over the Rainbow"	Israel Kamakawiwoʻole	Will Schuester and Noah Puckerman	22. "Journey to Regionals"	Yes	Journey to Regionals	

== See also ==
- List of songs in Glee (season 2)
- List of songs in Glee (season 3)
- List of songs in Glee (season 4)
- List of songs in Glee (season 5)
- List of songs in Glee (season 6)
- Glee albums discography
