= The Rhodes Not Taken =

- Glee episode
- Episode no.: Season 1 Episode 5
- Directed by: John Scott
- Written by: Ian Brennan
- Production code: 1ARC04
- Original air date: September 30, 2009

Guest appearances
- Kristin Chenoweth as April Rhodes; Stephen Tobolowsky as Sandy Ryerson; Iqbal Theba as Principal Figgins; Naya Rivera as Santana Lopez; Heather Morris as Brittany Pierce; Harry Shum Jr. as Mike Chang; Dijon Talton as Matt Rutherford; Jayson Blair as Chris; Susan Leslie as Sandra; Josh Sussman as Jacob Ben Israel

Episode chronology
| ← Previous "Preggers" | Next → "Vitamin D" |
- Glee season 1

"The Rhodes Not Taken" is the fifth episode of the first season of the American television series Glee. It premiered on the Fox network on September 30, 2009, and was written by series co-creator Ian Brennan and directed by John Scott. The episode features glee club director Will Schuester (Matthew Morrison) recruiting former star April Rhodes (Kristin Chenoweth), hoping to improve the club's chances in the wake of Rachel’s (Lea Michele) defection to the school musical. Finn (Cory Monteith) flirts with Rachel in an attempt to convince her to return, and although Rachel is angry when she discovers Finn's girlfriend is pregnant, she ultimately rejoins the club.

Special guest star Kristin Chenoweth played April, and performed on three of the episode's six musical tracks. Studio recordings of four of the songs performed in the episode were released as singles, available for digital download, and two appear on the album Glee: The Music, Volume 1.

The episode was watched by 7.32 million U.S. viewers. It received mostly positive reviews from critics, with Chenoweth's appearance and the performance of Queen cover "Somebody to Love" in particular receiving praise. Raymund Flandez for The Wall Street Journal, Mike Hale of the New York Times and Denise Martin for the Los Angeles Times all deemed "Somebody to Love" the show's best musical number since the staging of Journey's "Don't Stop Believin'" in the pilot episode.

== Plot ==
With lead singer Rachel Berry (Lea Michele) no longer part of New Directions, the McKinley High glee club, director Will Schuester (Matthew Morrison) grows concerned about the club's forthcoming performance at Invitationals. He discovers that April Rhodes (Kristin Chenoweth), a member of the club during his own high school days, never actually graduated, and convinces her to return to school in order to get her diploma and join the glee club. Having failed to achieve her Broadway dreams, April is now an alcoholic, and goes about winning the favor of the existing club members by unconventional means, including getting Kurt (Chris Colfer) drunk and teaching Mercedes (Amber Riley) and Tina (Jenna Ushkowitz) to shoplift. After guidance counselor Emma Pillsbury (Jayma Mays) warns Will that April is corrupting the students, Will asks April to become sober, and she vows to do so.

Club member Finn (Cory Monteith) is concerned for his future, having been told by his girlfriend Quinn (Dianna Agron) that she is pregnant with his child. Emma suggests that instead of aiming to attend college on a football scholarship, Finn should utilize his musical talent. Believing Rachel's participation to be the glee club's only chance at success at Invitationals, Finn feigns romantic interest in Rachel and takes her on a date. Rachel, realizing she is unhappy performing in the school musical and excited over Finn's interest in her, returns to the glee club. Meanwhile, Kurt, Mercedes and Tina are informed of Quinn's pregnancy by Puck (Mark Salling), who pretends Finn fathered the child though he is the actual father. Finding out about Quinn, Rachel becomes furious with Finn and confronts him, asking if he is actually attracted to her at all. Finn insists the kiss they shared was honest, but Rachel is unconvinced and defects from glee club once again, returning to the school musical, where she is given full artistic control. At Invitationals, a drunk April, accompanied by the glee club, performs Carrie Underwood's "Last Name" for a packed auditorium and receives the standing ovation she always dreamed of. Because she had performed drunk, Will tells April during intermission that she is no longer in the glee club. She accepts, telling him that she has realized that it is the kids, not her, who are the ones that should get the spotlight. This leaves New Directions without a lead singer for their next number, but Rachel offers to go on in April's place—she has quit the musical, and wants to rejoin the club—and they all perform Queen's "Somebody to Love".

== Production ==
Chenoweth guest starred in the episode as former glee club member April Rhodes. April is an "alcoholic and bad influence on the glee club members", described by Chenoweth as someone who never graduated, but was "kind of the deal" in her high school glee club. She explained that April didn't become the "big star" everyone expected her to, and so is brought back by Will to become part of the glee club again.

Chenoweth was previously acquainted with Glee creator Ryan Murphy, having appeared in his 2006 film Running with Scissors. Murphy commented that he loves writing for Chenoweth, and enjoyed pitching songs she had never sung before. She found singing in three different styles, as required by the role, to be "fun and challenging", and though she had never before sung "Maybe This Time", after singing it on Glee, she went on to use it in shows as her opening number. Chenoweth stated that she would love to return to Glee in the future, a sentiment shared by Murphy. She commented: "they are all working hard to figure out stories all the time. It'd be great for it to make sense for her to come back. This part is like nothing I've had the chance to do on TV." It was confirmed in October 2009 that Chenoweth would reprise the role, which she did in "Home".

Asked to explain Finn's actions in flirting with Rachel to entice her back into the glee club, Monteith explained: "Finn is not only strangely attracted to Rachel, but he respects what she chases after in her life. He's walking a thin line and trying to be somebody for everybody, and she's an example of someone truly following her dreams and that's attractive."

The episode features cover versions of "Don't Stop Believin'" by Journey, "Maybe This Time" and "Cabaret" from Cabaret, "Alone" by Heart, "Last Name" by Carrie Underwood and "Somebody to Love" by Queen. Studio recordings of "Maybe This Time", "Alone", "Last Name" and "Somebody to Love" were released as singles, available for digital download. "Maybe This Time" charted at number 100 in Australia, and 88 in the US, "Alone" charted at number 94 in Australia, 58 in Canada and 51 in the US, and "Somebody to Love" charted at number 65 in Australia, 33 in Canada and 28 in the US. "Maybe This Time", "Alone" and "Somebody to Love" also featured on the album Glee: The Music, Volume 1.

== Reception ==
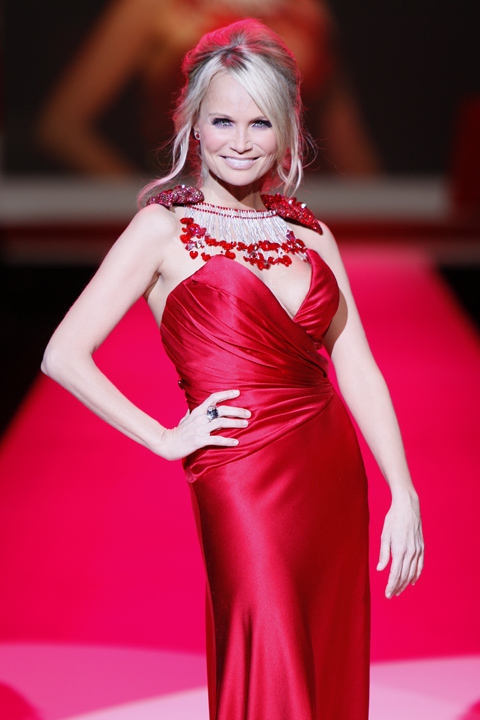
Kristin Chenoweth was praised by critics for her performance as April Rhodes.

The episode was watched by 7.32 million U.S. viewers and attained a 3.2/9 rating/share in the 18–49 demographic. It was the most viewed episode of the season since its fall return with "Showmance". It was the twenty-sixth most watched show in Canada for the week of broadcast, with 1.45 million viewers. In the UK, the episode was watched by 1.89 million viewers (1.48 million on E4, and 410,000 on E4+1), becoming the most-watched show on cable for the week, as well as the most-watched episode of the series at the time.

The episode received mostly positive reviews from critics. Robert Bianco for USA Today wrote of Chenoweth's guest appearance: "Her presence may not make much sense, but that's probably all right. If it means hearing Chenoweth sing, we can put up with any explanation the show cares to offer." Raymund Flandez for The Wall Street Journal was equally positive regarding Chenoweth's role, praising her "powerful voice", "kittenish mien" and "commanding presence". Flandez deemed the performance of "Somebody to Love" the show's best number since "Don't Stop Believin'" debuted in the pilot episode. Mike Hale of the New York Times similarly stated that "The Rhodes Not Taken" was "the best episode musically since the pilot", calling the performance of "Somebody to Love" "truly rousing". TV Guide included the renditions of "Somebody To Love" and "Maybe This Time" in its list of Glee's best performances so far.

The Los Angeles Times's Denise Martin also enjoyed the episode, writing: "I don't know how Glee keeps topping itself—it just does!" Martin too praised the performance of "Somebody to Love", writing: "Love or hate Queen, when New Directions sings it, it's magical. And it's the first time since 'Don't Stop Believin'' that I got goosebumps. Something about kids singing songs, raising all those arms, makes everyone—can't just be me!—giddy and hopeful. They're not as technically skilled as [rival glee club] Vocal Adrenaline—yet—but that only makes their underdog story more real." Tim Stack of Entertainment Weekly also called "The Rhodes Not Taken" the best episode of Glee so far, deeming all the musical numbers "fantastic". Eric Goldman for IGN rated the episode 8.5/10. He felt that Chenoweth was "terrific" as April, and that the character was a "hysterical creation". Goldman assessed that the episode "soared" musically, though felt that its resolution was "rushed" and "forced", suggesting that the series has yet to find the right balance between music, comedy and drama.
