= Ballad (Glee) =

- Glee episode
- Episode no.: Season 1 Episode 10
- Directed by: Brad Falchuk
- Written by: Brad Falchuk
- Production code: 1ARC09
- Original air date: November 18, 2009

Guest appearances
- Gregg Henry as Russell Fabray; Charlotte Ross as Judy Fabray; Romy Rosemont as Carole Hudson; Sarah Drew as Suzy Pepper; Naya Rivera as Santana Lopez; Heather Morris as Brittany Pierce; Harry Shum Jr. as Mike Chang

Episode chronology
← Previous "Wheels"	Next → "Hairography"
- Glee season 1

"Ballad" is the tenth episode of the American television series Glee. The episode premiered on the Fox network on November 18, 2009, and was written and directed by series creator Brad Falchuk. "Ballad" sees the glee club split into pairs to sing ballads to one another. Rachel (Lea Michele) is paired with club director Will (Matthew Morrison) and develops a crush on him. Quinn's (Dianna Agron) parents learn that Quinn is pregnant, and she moves in with Finn (Cory Monteith) and his mother when her own parents evict her. Gregg Henry and Charlotte Ross guest-star as Quinn's parents Russell and Judy Fabray, and Sarah Drew appears as Suzy Pepper, a student with a former crush on Will. Romy Rosemont returns as Finn's mother, Carole Hudson.

The episode features covers of seven songs, including a mash-up of "Don't Stand So Close to Me" by The Police and "Young Girl" by Gary Puckett and The Union Gap. Studio recordings of all songs performed in the episode were released as singles, available for digital download. "Ballad" was watched by 7.29 million US viewers and received mixed reviews from critics. Elizabeth Holmes of The Wall Street Journal and Liz Pardue of Zap2it were disappointed that Jane Lynch did not appear as Sue Sylvester, though Mike Hale of The New York Times did not miss her presence. Bobby Hankinson of the Houston Chronicle deemed "Ballad" one of the best episodes of Glee to date. Dan Snierson of Entertainment Weekly did not enjoy it as much as the preceding episode "Wheels" but reviewed the episode positively overall, while Eric Zorn of the Chicago Tribune deemed it "deliriously, deliciously bad".

"Ballad" was the episode submission of Dianna Agron for the Primetime Emmy Award for Outstanding Lead Actress in a Comedy Series, but her nomination failed to make the final cut.

== Plot ==
Glee club director Will Schuester (Matthew Morrison) has the club split up into pairs to sing ballads to one another. As Matt Rutherford (Dijon Talton) is absent, Will is forced to take his place and sing with Rachel (Lea Michele), who develops a crush on him. Will is dismayed, remembering Suzy Pepper (Sarah Drew), the last student who had such strong feelings for him. When her feelings were not reciprocated, she was so distraught she ate an extremely hot pepper from Sinaloa, was hospitalized, and had to have an esophagus transplant. Rachel visits Will's apartment, where his wife Terri (Jessalyn Gilsig) puts her to work cooking and cleaning. After an encounter with Suzy Pepper, during which Suzy explains that the two of them are similar and that chasing after Will won't repair Rachel's self-esteem, Rachel realizes her feelings for Will reflect her concerns about her own self-worth and apologizes for her behavior. Afterward, Will assures her that she will find the man of her dreams who loves her for who she is.

Finn is paired with Kurt (Chris Colfer), who advises him to sing his ballad to his unborn daughter. When Finn's mother Carole (Romy Rosemont) finds him singing to a sonogram video, she deduces that his girlfriend Quinn (Dianna Agron) is pregnant. Finn has dinner with Quinn and her parents Russell and Judy (Gregg Henry and Charlotte Ross), and reveals Quinn's pregnancy to them via singing "(You're) Having My Baby". Russell says he is extremely disappointed in his daughter, disowns Quinn, and evicts her from the family home; she moves in with Finn and his mother. Kurt feels responsible for encouraging Finn to reveal the truth and apologizes; when Finn asks him what ballad Kurt was planning to sing to him, Kurt says it is "I Honestly Love You". Puck (Mark Salling) tells his ballad partner Mercedes (Amber Riley) that he is the father of Quinn's baby, and Mercedes advises him to leave Quinn alone. The glee club then comes together to sing "Lean on Me" in support of Finn and Quinn.

== Production ==
"Ballad" was written and directed by series creator Brad Falchuk. Recurring characters who appear in the episode are glee club members Brittany (Heather Morris), Santana Lopez (Naya Rivera) and Mike Chang (Harry Shum, Jr.). Romy Rosemont plays Finn's mother Carole Hudson, her first appearance since the series' second episode, and Gregg Henry and Charlotte Ross guest-star as Quinn's parents, Russell and Judy Fabray. Sarah Drew is Suzy Pepper, a student with "an insane, absurd, psychotic crush on Mr. Schuester". Drew described Suzy as "kind of stalkerish and creepy", but ultimately redeemable.

The episode features cover versions of "Endless Love" by Diana Ross and Lionel Richie, "I'll Stand by You" by The Pretenders, "Crush" by Jennifer Paige, "(You're) Having My Baby" by Paul Anka and Odia Coates, "Lean on Me" by Bill Withers, and a mash-up of "Don't Stand So Close to Me" by The Police and "Young Girl" by Gary Puckett and The Union Gap. Studio recordings of all songs performed in the episode were released as singles, available for digital download, and are also included on the album Glee: The Music, Volume 2. "Endless Love" charted at number 87 in Canada, and 78 in America. "I'll Stand by You" reached number 65 in Canada and 73 in America, while "Don't Stand So Close to Me / Young Girl" charted at number 67 in Canada and 64 in America.

== Reception ==
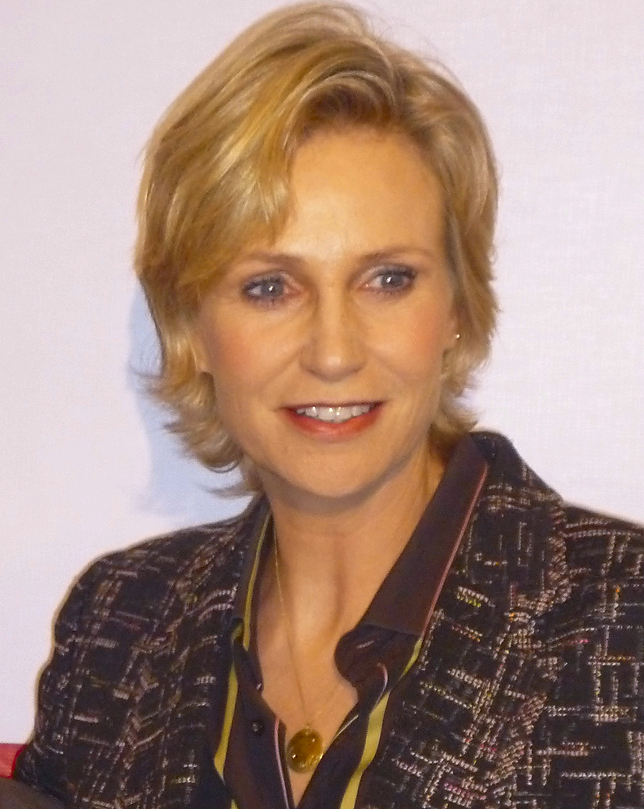
The absence of Jane Lynch was lamented by several critics.

"Ballad" was watched by 7.29 million US viewers and attained a 3.2/8 rating/share in the 18–49 demographic. It was the highest-rated program on the night of broadcast with adults 18–34 and teens. In Canada, it was the twentieth most watched show in the week of broadcast, attaining 1.74 million viewers. In the UK, the episode was watched by 2.149 million viewers (1.752 million on E4, and 397,000 on E4+1), becoming the most-watched show on E4 and E4 +1 for the week, and one of the most-watched show on cable for the week, as well as the most-watched episode of the series at the time.

The episode received mixed reviews from critics. Elizabeth Holmes for The Wall Street Journal was disappointed that cheerleading coach Sue Sylvester did not appear in the episode, though was pleased that the pregnancy plot appeared to be coming to an end. Bobby Hankinson for the Houston Chronicle was also pleased the pregnancy plot moved towards a conclusion, and called "Ballad" one of the best episodes of Glee to date, commenting: "it's increasingly clear that the episodes without the messy adult drama are the strongest." Eric Goldman for IGN observed that "Ballad" proved Glee is capable of delivering a "pretty solid" episode without Jane Lynch's presence, rating the episode 8/10. Zap2it's Liz Pardue felt the absence of Lynch, but praised Chris Colfer's performance as Kurt.

Mike Hale of The New York Times did not miss Sue's presence in the episode, and wrote that "Ballad" contained some scenes which were "as honestly emotional as any since this series began, most of them involving Kurt and Finn". Gerrick D. Kennedy for the Los Angeles Times appreciated the episode for subverting expectations, by having Finn's mother react supportively to the news of Quinn's pregnancy, rather than the more affluent and financially capable Fabrays. Dan Snierson for Entertainment Weekly opined that "Ballad" was not as good as the preceding episode, "Wheels", but that overall: "it did offer up a few choice cuts and fun moments while advancing one big story line". James Poniewozik of Time agreed that "Ballad" was not as good as "Wheels", commenting: "it's amazing how Glee can career from excruciating to transcendent within a single episode." The Chicago Tribune's Eric Zorn, watching Glee for the first time, deemed the episode "deliriously, deliciously bad", deriding the casting of young adult actors as teenagers, the "one-dimensional stock characters" and the "kitschy plots". Zorn questioned: "So do people actually like this show, or just revel in its over-the-top, spectacular and, I admit, compelling badness?"
