= Hairography =

- Glee episode
- Episode no.: Season 1 Episode 11
- Directed by: Bill D'Elia
- Written by: Ian Brennan
- Production code: 1ARC10
- Original air date: November 25, 2009

Guest appearances
- Eve as Grace Hitchens; Jennifer Aspen as Kendra Giardi; Michael Hitchcock as Dalton Rumba; Naya Rivera as Santana Lopez; Heather Morris as Brittany Pierce; Harry Shum Jr. as Mike Chang; Dijon Talton as Matt Rutherford; Michael Loeffelholz as Phil Giardi; John Autry as the deaf choir soloist

Episode chronology
← Previous "Ballad"	Next → "Mattress"
- Glee season 1

"Hairography" is the eleventh episode of the American television series Glee. The episode premiered on the Fox network on November 25, 2009. It was written by series creator Ian Brennan and directed by Bill D'Elia. The episode introduces New Directions' rival glee clubs, the Jane Addams Girls Choir for girls recently released from juvenile detention, and the Haverbrook Deaf Choir. Cheerleading coach Sue Sylvester (Jane Lynch) sabotages New Directions by giving their set-list for sectionals to the competing clubs. Quinn (Dianna Agron) reconsiders having her baby adopted, but ultimately recommits to the idea, and Rachel (Lea Michele) tries unsuccessfully to attract Finn (Cory Monteith).

Rapper Eve guest-stars as Grace Hitchens, director of the Jane Addams Girls Choir, and So You Think You Can Dance contestants Katee Shean, Kherington Payne and Comfort Fedoke appear as members of her group. The episode features covers of eight songs, including a mash-up of "Hair" from the musical Hair and "Crazy in Love" by Beyoncé featuring Jay-Z. Studio recordings of all but one of the songs performed in the episode were released as singles, available for digital download.

"Hairography" was watched by 6.1 million US viewers and received mixed reviews from critics. Raymund Flandez of The Wall Street Journal deemed the mash-up performance one of the worst of the season, with Zap2it's Liz Pardue agreeing that it was "hideous". Flandez, Pardue and Mike Hale of The New York Times all felt that it was inappropriate for New Directions to interrupt the deaf choir's performance of "Imagine", however Bobby Hankinson of the Houston Chronicle opined that reviewers needed to "realize that this show takes its jabs at everyone, but it always has a wink and a hug and lots and lots of love behind it".

== Plot ==
New Directions' director Will Schuester (Matthew Morrison) suspects that cheerleading coach Sue Sylvester (Jane Lynch) has been colluding with rival glee clubs, and visits the Jane Addams Academy for girls recently released from juvenile detention. When their club director Grace Hitchens (Eve) reveals the extent of the school's under-funding, Will invites her club to perform in the McKinley High auditorium. Will is intimidated by their opposition, but Rachel (Lea Michele) assures him that the girls are using the power of "hairography"—frequent, dramatic hair-tossing—to distract from the fact their singing and dancing ability is limited. Will purchases wigs for New Directions and has them utilize hairography themselves, performing a mash-up of "Hair" and "Crazy in Love". Dalton Rumba (Michael Hitchcock), glee club director at Haverbrook School for the Deaf, feels slighted by the invitation Will extended to the Jane Addams Academy, and arranges for his own club to also perform at McKinley High. His club duets with New Directions on John Lennon's "Imagine", and Will realizes that the new mash-up and hairography routine is not working. He removes it from the club's set-list, replacing it with a performance of "True Colors". Unbeknownst to Will, Sue reveals two songs from New Directions' line-up for sectionals to Grace and Dalton, suggesting they have their own clubs perform them to gain an edge in the competition.

Quinn (Dianna Agron) begins to doubt her decision to give her baby to Will's wife Terri (Jessalyn Gilsig), and re-considers her stance on raising the baby with Puck (Mark Salling) instead of Finn (Cory Monteith). She tells Terri she wants to keep the baby, but in an effort to change her mind, Terri's sister Kendra (Jennifer Aspen) has Quinn babysit her three unruly sons. Quinn invites Puck to babysit with her and the two bond, however when Quinn discovers that Puck spent the evening sexting his ex-girlfriend Santana (Naya Rivera), she re-commits to having the baby adopted, believing her daughter deserves a better father.

Kurt (Chris Colfer) gives Rachel a make-over, ostensibly to help her attract Finn, but in reality attempting to sabotage her chances with him. Finn is unimpressed with Rachel's new look before telling her he remembered having the conversation with Kurt about what he liked in girls. Rachel confronts Kurt, stating that even if he is in love with Finn, she will always have a better chance "because [she's] a girl". But Kurt tells her that they are both kidding themselves: Finn is in love with Quinn and nothing will change that.

== Production ==
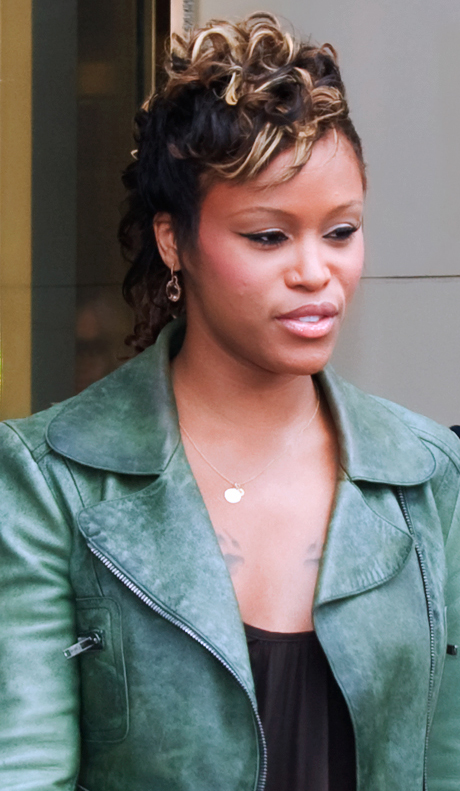
Eve guest-starred in the episode as Grace Hitchens, director of the Jane Addams Girls Choir.

"Hairography" was written by series creator Ian Brennan, and directed by Bill D'Elia. Recurring characters who appear in the episode are glee club members Brittany (Heather Morris), Santana Lopez (Rivera), Mike Chang (Harry Shum Jr.) and Matt Rutherford (Dijon Talton), Terri's sister Kendra Giardi (Aspen), Kendra's husband Phil (Michael Loeffelholz), and their triplet sons (Aidan, Ethan and Ben Freedman). Hitchcock guest-stars as rival glee club director Dalton Rumba, and rapper Eve plays another club director, Grace Hitchens. So You Think You Can Dance contestants Katee Shean, Kherington Payne and Comfort Fedoke appear as members of Grace's club.

Eve was contracted to appear in two episodes of Glee, having been offered the role of Grace after Whitney Houston declined to appear. Discussing her casting, Eve stated: "I got asked and I'd heard the buzz about the show. When the first pilot episode came out, I figured it was something different and something we haven't seen on TV before. I didn't want to turn it down!" She commented that she would have loved to have seen Whitney Houston appear in the show, explaining: "I think it would've been different in a sense because she's an original diva. She would've brought a whole other energy, which would've been amazing." Comparing her character Grace to McKinley High glee director Will, Eve explained: "For me especially, I come from a harder place. I'm the teacher of a reform school. I'm used to being very strict." Asked if she would return to the show in the future, she replied: "If I'm asked to do it, I definitely would. It's just a really well-made, smart show." Though she does not sing in "Hairography", Eve commented that she would like to do so if she returned to Glee in the future, naming "Sweet Dreams (Are Made of This)" by Eurythmics as her ideal song choice.

The episode features cover versions of "Bootylicious" by Destiny's Child, "Don't Make Me Over" by Dionne Warwick, "Papa Don't Preach" by Madonna, a mash-up of "Hair" from the musical Hair and "Crazy in Love" by Beyoncé featuring Jay-Z, "Imagine" by John Lennon, "True Colors" by Cyndi Lauper and "You're the One That I Want" from Grease. Yoko Ono was hesitant about allowing Glee the rights to "Imagine". Series music supervisor P.J. Bloom explained: "It was very difficult to convince Yoko Ono that it was the right thing to do. She needed to truly understand how the music was going to be used. The added component of us wanting to have a deaf choir signing the song made for this incredibly poignant moment. ...It really took a lot of convincing to get her on board and realize that it was a great, great moment, and a tribute to John and his song." Studio recordings of all the songs performed in the episode except "You're the One That I Want" were released as singles, available for digital download. "Imagine" charted at number 82 in Australia, 49 in Canada and 67 in America, while "True Colors" charted at number 47 in Australia, 38 in Canada and 66 in America. "Don't Make Me Over", "Imagine" and "True Colors" are also included on the album Glee: The Music, Volume 2.

== Reception ==
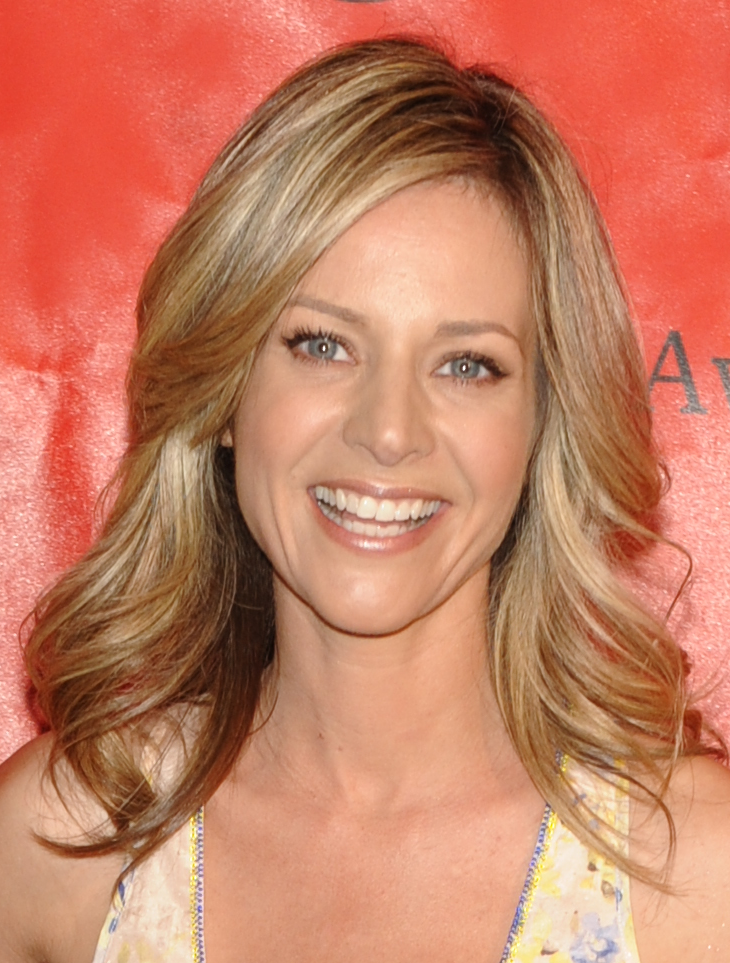
The pregnancy storyline involving Gilsig (pictured) and Agron was poorly received by critics.

"Hairography" was watched by 6.1 million U.S. viewers, and attained a 2.5/7 rating/share in the 18-49 demographic. Its viewership was a season low, however the episode aired the night before Thanksgiving, when all the major networks saw decreased ratings. In Canada, it was the twenty-second most watched show for the week of broadcast, attaining 1.37 million viewers. In the UK, the episode was watched by 2.231 million viewers (1.886 million on E4, and 345,000 on E4+1), becoming the most-watched show on E4 and E4 +1 for the week, and the most-watched show on cable for the week, as well as the most-watched episode of the series at the time. Lynda K. Walker, Ann Marie Luddy, Michael Ward and Gina Bonacquisti were nominated for the "Outstanding Hairstyling for a Single-Camera Series" award at the 62nd Primetime Emmy Awards for their work on the episode.

The episode received mixed reviews from critics. Raymund Flandez of The Wall Street Journal was critical of New Directions' mash-up performance, deeming it one of the worst performances of the season. He enjoyed the deaf choir's rendition of "Imagine", but wished that New Directions had not interrupted and joined in with them. Mike Hale of The New York Times also disapproved of New Directions joining in with the deaf choir, writing that "Imagine": "was shaping up to be the best thing in the episode" until New Directions "torpedoed the moment." Liz Pardue of Zap2it felt that with "Hairography" Glee "wasn't at its best", deeming the writing less sharp than usual and observing that the pregnancy storyline dulled the episode for her. Pardue felt that New Directions were "butting in" to the Haverbrook performance of "Imagine", which she found "a little insulting", observing: "Good intentions, but cringe-y outcome." Pardue also criticized the mash-up of "Hair" and "Crazy in Love" as "hideous".

Gerrick D. Kennedy for the Los Angeles Times was generally more positive regarding the episode's musical performances, however was critical of the ongoing pregnancy plot, noting that he cringed whenever Quinn appeared on screen. Conversely, Bobby Hankinson of the Houston Chronicle enjoyed Quinn in the episode, writing: "I love that she can keep her Mean Girls edge while being heartbreakingly sad or as joyful as she was singing "Papa Don't Preach". He countered criticism of the portrayal of New Directions' rival choirs, suggesting: "at this point, everyone needs to realize that this show takes its jabs at everyone, but it always has a wink and a hug and lots and lots of love behind it." Entertainment Weekly's Dan Snierson reviewed the episode positively, calling the "Imagine" performance "a classic feel-good Glee moment, teeming with sappy but undeniable heart", while Aly Semigran of MTV deemed it her favorite musical moment from the show, feeling that it: "honored the classic song in such a respectful way."
