= Throwdown (Glee) =

- Glee episode
- Episode no.: Season 1 Episode 7
- Directed by: Ryan Murphy
- Written by: Brad Falchuk
- Production code: 1ARC06
- Original air date: October 14, 2009

Guest appearances
- Iqbal Theba as Principal Figgins; Jennifer Aspen as Kendra Giardi; Amy Hill as Dr. Chin; Naya Rivera as Santana Lopez; Heather Morris as Brittany Pierce; Harry Shum Jr. as Mike Chang; Dijon Talton as Matt Rutherford; Kenneth Choi as Dr. Wu; Josh Sussman as Jacob Ben Israel

Episode chronology
← Previous "Vitamin D"	Next → "Mash-Up"
- Glee season 1

"Throwdown" is the seventh episode of the American television series Glee. The episode premiered on the Fox network on October 14, 2009. It was directed by series creator Ryan Murphy and written by Brad Falchuk. The episode includes a clash between glee club director Will Schuester (Matthew Morrison) and cheerleading coach Sue Sylvester (Jane Lynch) when she is named co-director of the glee club. As Sue tries to divide the club by turning the students against Will, his wife Terri (Jessalyn Gilsig) blackmails her OB/GYN into colluding with her over her fake pregnancy.

The episode features covers of five songs. Studio recordings of four of the songs performed were released as singles, available for digital download, and were also included on the album Glee: The Music, Volume 1. "Throwdown" was watched by 7.65 million US viewers and received mixed reviews from critics. The pregnancy storyline was criticized by both Ken Tucker of Entertainment Weekly and Shawna Malcom of the Los Angeles Times. Raymund Flandez of The Wall Street Journal was unimpressed by Quinn's solo performance of The Supremes' "You Keep Me Hangin' On", though the group performance of "Keep Holding On" was generally better received by reviewers. Lynch as Sue in particular was widely praised, with Flandez and Zap2it's Liz Pardue both writing that Lynch gave an Emmy-worthy performance.

== Plot ==
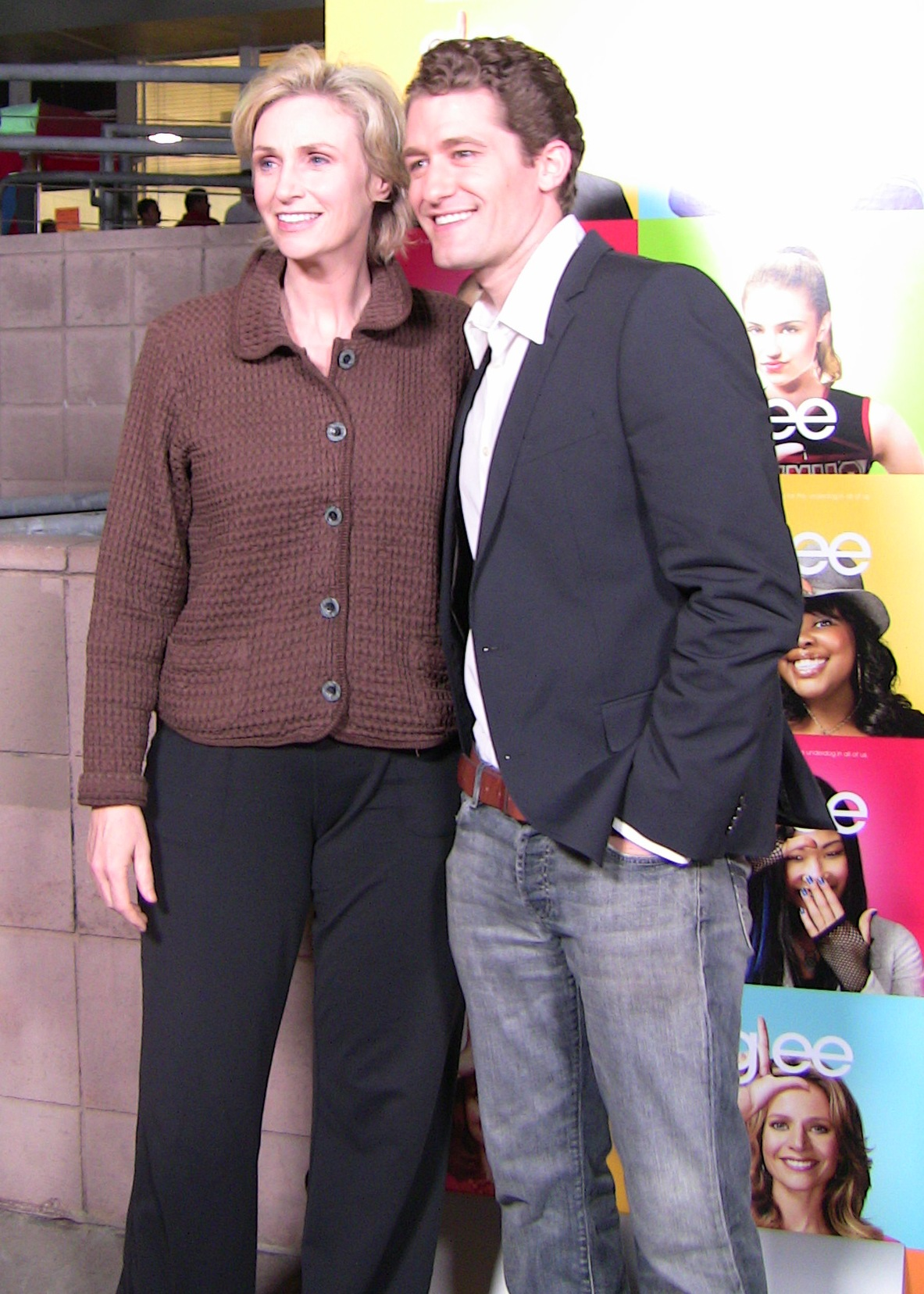
Lynch and Morrison play Sue and Will, who clash as co-directors of the glee club.

When cheerleading coach Sue Sylvester (Jane Lynch) is named co-director of the McKinley High glee club, she divides the group in two, hoping to turn the students against director Will Schuester (Matthew Morrison). Sue takes the minority students—Santana (Naya Rivera), Artie (Kevin McHale), Kurt (Chris Colfer), Tina (Jenna Ushkowitz), Mike (Harry Shum, Jr.), Mercedes (Amber Riley) and Matt (Dijon Talton)—for her group but only calls one of them by their normal name: Santana, “Wheels”, “Gay Kid”, “Asian/Other Asian (Tina is Asian #1, Mike is Asian #2), “Aretha”, and “Shaft.” leaving Will with only Finn (Cory Monteith), Rachel (Lea Michele), Quinn (Dianna Agron), Puck (Mark Salling) and Brittany (Heather Morris) in his group. Sue names her part of the club "Sue's Kids" and manipulates them, saying Will is discriminating against the students by making them sing backup. Sue also steals the piano, and the band, and tells Will that she wants to take over McKinley because she has hatred of people with curly hair. Will retaliates by failing all of Sue's cheerleaders in Spanish, which only exacerbates their hostilities.

Quinn and Finn go together for her ultrasound appointment, and they learn that she is expecting a girl. Finn, trying to be supportive, suggests they name the baby Drizzle, but Quinn is adamant she is having it adopted and is annoyed at his lack of understanding. Will, tired of his wife Terri's (Jessalyn Gilsig) refusal to let him participate in the pregnancy, sets up an appointment with Terri's OB/GYN so he can see their own baby on the ultrasound. With the help of her sister Kendra (Jennifer Aspen), Terri blackmails her doctor into faking the sonogram using Quinn's ultrasound DVD, in order to continue hiding the fact she isn't really pregnant. Meanwhile, Quinn jealously confronts Rachel about her relationship with Finn and threatens her. Rachel confronts Quinn about being a spy in the glee club for Sue and tells her that she will be kicked off the Cheerios once Sue finds out about her pregnancy.

School reporter Jacob Ben Israel (Josh Sussman) uncovers news of Quinn's pregnancy, and sexually blackmails Rachel. To protect Quinn and ensure Jacob will not release the story, Rachel agrees to give him her underwear, thinking it will keep him quiet. When both sections of the glee club stage a walkout in protest against Sue and Will's constant arguing, the two make amends and Sue steps down as co-director. Sue discovers the underwear in Jacob's locker and the reason for it, and makes him run the story about Quinn's pregnancy. She reveals her knowledge of the pregnancy to the club, and tells them that the whole school will soon know. A heartbroken Rachel stands up to Jacob after he broke his promise and he confesses saying that Sue made him do it. Quinn breaks down in tears in the hallway, and New Directions does a performance of "Keep Holding On" to show their support for her.

== Production ==
The episode was written by series creator Brad Falchuk and directed by co-creator Ryan Murphy. Recurring characters who appear in "Throwdown" are Principal Figgins (Iqbal Theba), Terri's sister Kendra Giardi, her OB/GYN Dr. Wu (Ken Choi), school reporter Jacob Ben Israel, and glee club members Santana Lopez, Brittany Pierce, Matt Rutherford and Mike Chang. Amy Hill guest stars as Dr. Wu's rival OB/GYN, Dr. Chin.

"Throwdown" features cover versions of "Hate on Me" by Jill Scott, "No Air" by Jordin Sparks, "You Keep Me Hangin' On" by The Supremes, "Keep Holding On" by Avril Lavigne, and "Ride wit Me" by Nelly. Studio recordings of "Hate on Me", "No Air", "You Keep Me Hangin' On" and "Keep Holding On" were released as singles, available for digital download, and are also included on the album Glee: The Music, Volume 1. "No Air" charted at number 52 in Australia, and 65 in America and Canada, while "Keep Holding On" reached number 56 in Australia and America, and 58 in Canada. "Ride wit Me" was recorded live in the episode, as, according to Shum, Jr., Murphy wanted to get the chill vibe, that spur-of-the-moment singing.

== Reception ==
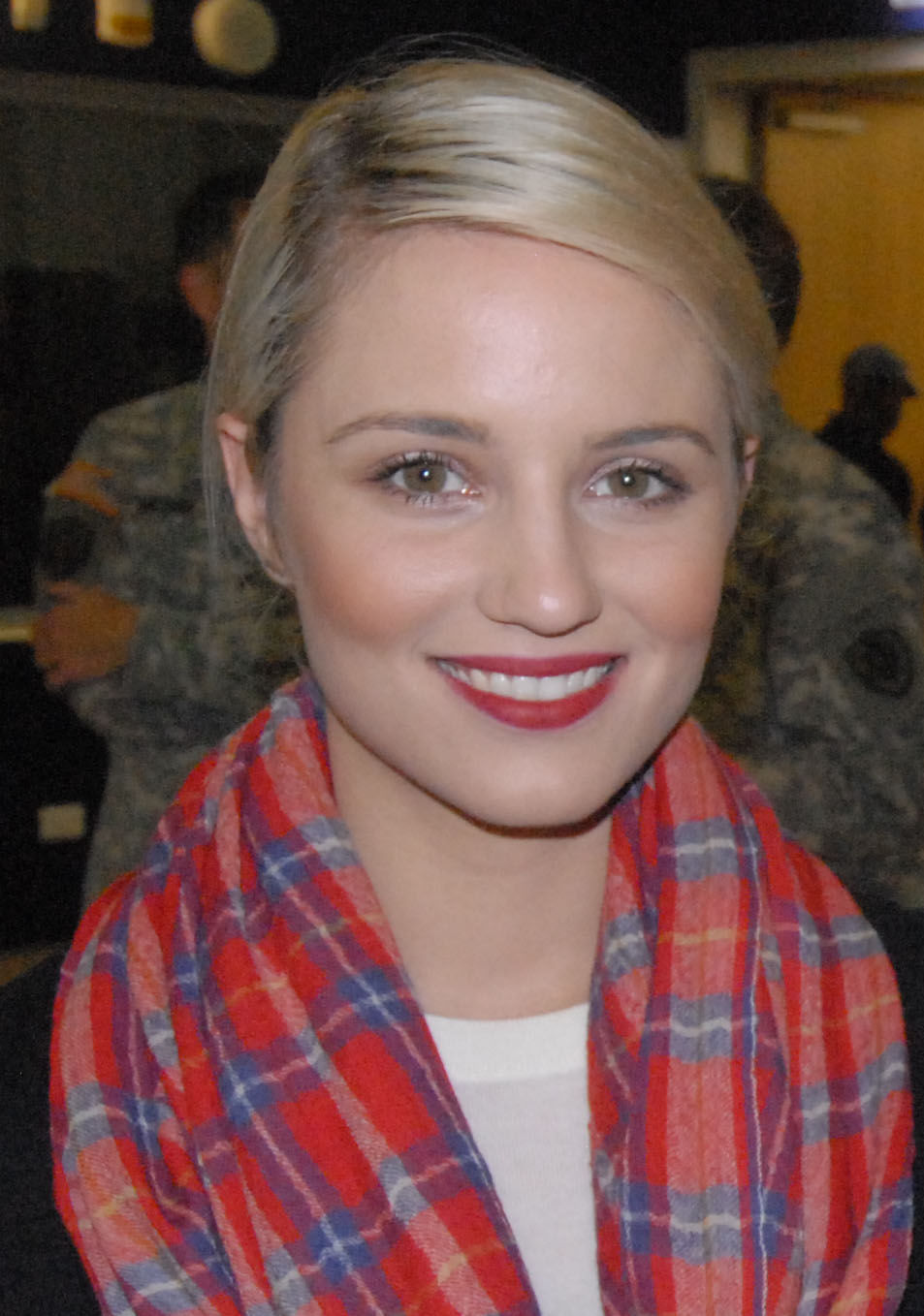
Dianna Agron's cover of "You Keep Me Hangin' On" was criticized by Raymund Flandez of The Wall Street Journal.

"Throwdown" was watched by 7.65 million US viewers and attained a 3.4/9 rating/share in the 18-49 demographic. It was the 26th most watched show of the week in Canada, with 1.4 million viewers. In the UK, the episode was watched by 2.066 million viewers (1.674 million on E4, and 388,000 on E4+1), becoming the most-watched show on E4 and E4 +1 for the week, and the most-watched show on cable for the week, as well as the most-watched episode of the series at the time. The episode received mixed reviews from critics. Mike Hale of the New York Times felt that "Throwdown": "emphasized the show's increasingly dual nature" whereby "the students are in a pretty good musical, and the adults are in a below-average dramedy." Wendy Mitchell of Entertainment Weekly deemed the episode "welcome light relief", while Shawna Malcom of the Los Angeles Times called it "perhaps Glee's sharpest episode yet", describing it as "chock-full of standout scenes". Eric Goldman for IGN rated the episode 8.8/10, criticizing it for "overly earnest, saccharine moments" but commenting that it was a "great example" of Glee "just being damn funny".

Lynch's performance as Sue attracted praise, with Raymund Flandez of The Wall Street Journal and Liz Pardue of Zap2it both calling her portrayal Emmy-worthy. Entertainment Weekly writer Ken Tucker called her "the greatest Broadway-musical villain to ever co-star in a TV series", deeming "Throwdown" "possibly the best showcase yet for Jane Lynch", while Malcom praised the interaction between Lynch and Morrison, writing that their scenes "crackled with electric wit". The pregnancy storyline drew criticism, with Tucker opining that it "nearly derailed an otherwise-excellent episode" and writing: "there's got to be a better way to ground the series in a serious plot-line that doesn't make you wish the pregnancy plot was all just a non-musical dream sequence." Malcom also criticized the storyline, asking if it could "please just go away already?" and writing that her patience with it was running out.

Musical performances received mixed reviews. Flandez deemed the cover of "Keep Holding On" an "emotionally satisfying showstopper", however was critical of Quinn's cover of "You Keep Me Hangin On", which he called "thin and jarring". Mitchell enjoyed the "No Air" duet, however felt it would be nice to see characters besides Finn and Rachel take the lead on the majority of songs. Reviewing musical performances in the series so far on October 21, 2009, Denise Martin for the Los Angeles Times rated "Hate On Me" the fourth best performance to date, writing that Riley: "blew [her] away." In December 2012, TV Guide also named the rendition one of Glee's best performances, describing it as "a real Beyoncé moment". Aly Semigran of MTV observed that Quinn spontaneously bursting into song brought Glee "dangerously close to High School Musical territory".
