= John Stuart Scott =

American television director and producer

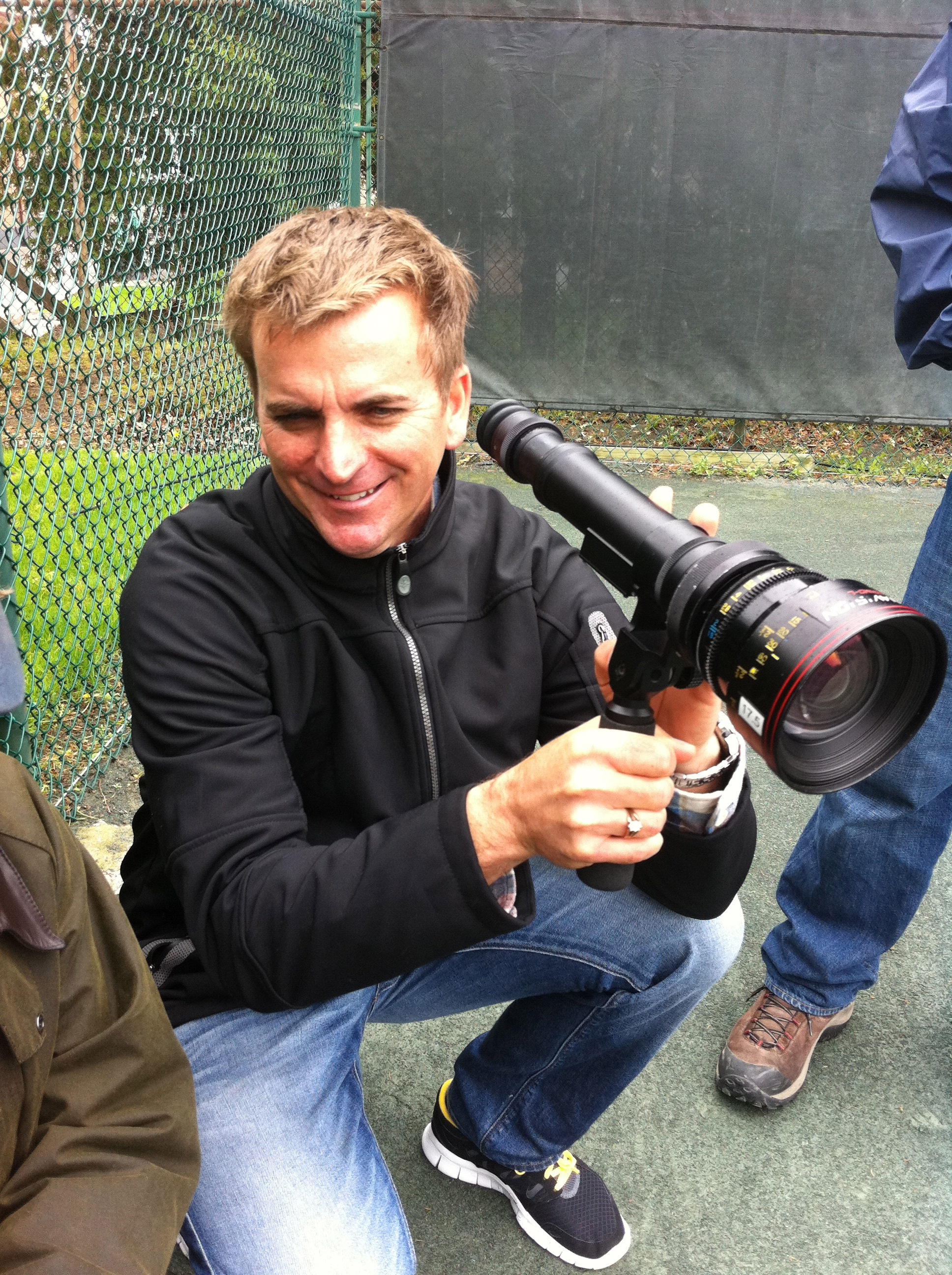
- directing Suits, 2011.
- Born: October 11, 1966 (age 59); Long Beach, California, U.S
- Occupation: television director
- Years active: 1993–present

John Stuart Scott (sometimes credited as John Scott or John S. Scott) is an American television director and producer who has directed episodes for several series including Glee, The Office and Chuck.

== Television work ==
Scott began his career behind the camera working on a number of films and television series and commercials starting in the early 1990s. In 2009, he made his directorial debut on drama series Nip/Tuck, and also directed the final episode of that series in 2010. He subsequently directed two episodes— "Acafellas" and "The Rhodes Not Taken"— of the first season of Glee, the third episode— Andy's Play— of the seventh season of the American version of The Office, and episodes for shows such as Scoundrels, Chuck, Love Bites, Gigantic, Outsourced, and American Horror Story.
