= Jay Blaze =

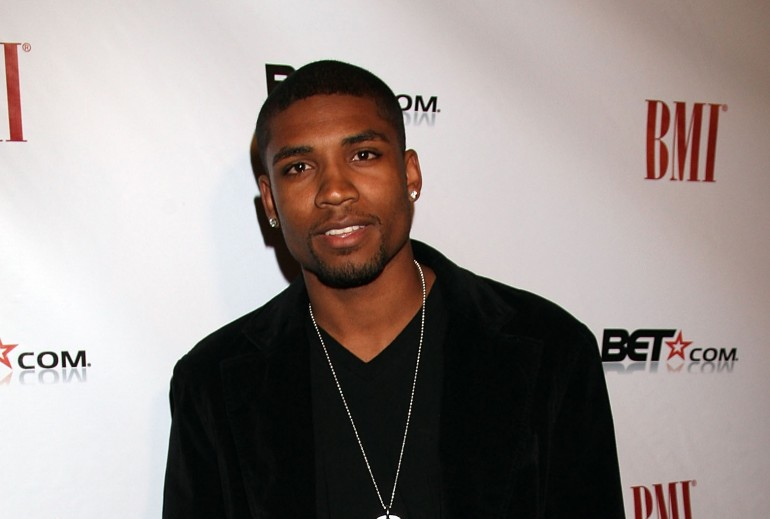
- Jay Blaze in 2010

Background information
- Also known as: Jay Blaze
- Born: Jazon Keith Jackson
- Genres: Hip hop, pop
- Occupation(s): Rapper, record producer, CEO
- Years active: 2004–present
- Labels: Global Sound Music Group
- Website: www.JayBlaze.com

Jazon Jackson, better known by his stage name Jay Blaze, is an American rapper, record producer, songwriter, and CEO of Global Sound Music.

== Music and career ==
In May 2008, Blaze's song "Move" was released in collaboration with producer Ronald "Jukebox" Jackson.

In 2009, his songs, "Move" and "Hit the Road" appeared on MTV's Making The Band 4.

In 2010, Blaze released a single titled "Universal Man" featuring Ray J.

In 2013, Jay Blaze was chosen as Power 106's Young California Pick of the Week.

In 2014, Jay Blaze collaborated with singer Dijon Talton for a music video titled Shorty She Bad. The video premiered on Vibe and was aired on MTV VOD. Later in 2014, he also released an E.P. titled Haterz Stay Back.

In 2015, Jay Blaze interpolated Salt & Pepa's song "Push It" and released a track titled P*$$y Real Good.

== Personal life ==
Blaze resides in Los Angeles, California.

== Discography ==
=== Albums ===
- 2010: Tunnel Vision

=== Extended Play ===
- 2013: Universal Man
- 2014: Haterz Stay Back

=== Singles ===
- 2010: Follow Me (promotional single)
- 2010: Tunnel Vision (promotional single)
- 2010: TBA (official single)

== Filmography ==
Year	Title	Role	Notes
2008	Making The Band 4	Jay Blaze - "Move"	Episode 5 Hit the road
2008	Making The Band 4	Jay Blaze - "I'm here now"	Episode 7 Sex and the Diddy
2010	Natalia Kills	Bobby	Episode 7
