= Acafellas =

- Glee episode
- Episode no.: Season 1 Episode 3
- Directed by: John Scott
- Written by: Ryan Murphy
- Production code: 1ARC02
- Original air date: September 16, 2009

Guest appearances
- Josh Groban as himself; Stephen Tobolowsky as Sandy Ryerson; Patrick Gallagher as Ken Tanaka; Iqbal Theba as Principal Figgins; Debra Monk as Mrs. Schuester; John Lloyd Young as Henri St. Pierre; Naya Rivera as Santana Lopez; Heather Morris as Brittany Pierce; Whit Hertford as Dakota Stanley; Clint Culp as the teamster; Kent Avenido as Howard Bamboo; Victor Garber as Mr. Schuester

Episode chronology
← Previous "Showmance"	Next → "Preggers"
- Glee season 1

"Acafellas" is the third episode of the American television series Glee. The episode premiered on the Fox network on September 16, 2009. It was directed by John Scott and written by series creator Ryan Murphy. The episode sees glee club director Will Schuester (Matthew Morrison) form an all-male a cappella group, the Acafellas, neglecting the club in favor of dedicating his time to the new endeavor. New Directions struggle with choreography, and resist attempts at sabotage by members of the cheer squad. Mercedes (Amber Riley) harbors romantic feelings for Kurt (Chris Colfer), who comes out as gay.

Singer Josh Groban guest stars as himself, John Lloyd Young appears as wood shop teacher Henri St. Pierre, and Victor Garber and Debra Monk play Will's parents. The episode features covers of seven songs, including the instrumental piece "La Camisa Negra" performed on guitar by Mark Salling. Studio recordings of two of the songs performed were released as singles, available for digital download, and two of the tracks also appear on the album Glee: The Music, Volume 1.

The episode was watched by 6.69 million US viewers and received mixed reviews from critics. Entertainment Weekly's Tim Stack and The New York Times's Mike Hale welcomed the return of Stephen Tobolowsky as Sandy Ryerson, while Ryan Brockington of the New York Post and Raymund Flandez of The Wall Street Journal praised Riley's cover of Jazmine Sullivan's "Bust Your Windows". However, Rachel Ray, reviewing the episode for The Independent, deemed it "overhyped [...] uninspired, confusing and with a simple plot to boot."

== Plot ==
When Rachel Berry (Lea Michele) questions director Will Schuester's choreography skills during a glee club rehearsal, he forms an all-male a cappella group, the Acafellas, to build his confidence. The group originally consists of Will, football coach Ken Tanaka (Patrick Gallagher), woodshop teacher Henri St. Pierre (John Lloyd Young) and Howard Bamboo (Kent Avenido), a co-worker of Will's wife Terri (Jessalyn Gilsig). After their first performance however, Henri and Howard drop out and Will replaces them with glee club member Finn Hudson (Cory Monteith), who was considering quitting glee club, and his fellow football player Puck (Mark Salling). Former glee club director Sandy Ryerson (Stephen Tobolowsky) also joins the group, having arranged for singer Josh Groban to be at their next performance. Although the star compliments their rendition of "I Wanna Sex You Up", he reveals that he only attended to make sure Sandy stopped stalking him.

In Will's absence, the glee club hires Dakota Stanley (Whit Hertford), the choreographer of a rival club, Vocal Adrenaline, to help coach them to a Nationals championship. Cheerleaders Quinn (Dianna Agron), Santana (Naya Rivera) and Brittany (Heather Morris) hope that the notoriously harsh Stanley will prompt some members of the club to quit, furthering their plan to sabotage the club. Although Stanley is heavily critical of most of the group, Rachel convinces the members that their differences give them a unique edge, and fires the choreographer. The cheerleaders also lead Mercedes Jones (Amber Riley) to believe that fellow club member Kurt Hummel (Chris Colfer) has feelings for her, despite Rachel and Tina Cohen-Chang’s efforts to inform Mercedes that Kurt is obviously gay. Mercedes is hurt when Kurt rejects her advances. He misleads her into believing he has feelings for Rachel, which angers Mercedes, and she breaks the windshield of his car and sings "Bust Your Windows". Kurt later comes out as gay to her—the first time he has said it to anyone—and the two make up.

Cheerleading coach Sue Sylvester (Jane Lynch) is angry that the club is now stronger than ever, and punishes Quinn and Santana. Quinn retaliates by thanking Sue for helping her realize that believing in herself negates the need to bring other people down. Will realizes that his passion is teaching, not performing, and resolves to recommit to the glee club.

== Production ==
Recurring cast members who appear in "Acafellas" are Stephen Tobolowsky as former glee club director Sandy Ryerson, Patrick Gallagher as football coach Ken Tanaka, Iqbal Theba as Principal Figgins, Kent Avenido as Sheets and Things employee Howard Bamboo, and Naya Rivera and Heather Morris as glee club members Santana Lopez and Brittany Pierce. Whit Hertford guest-starred as choreographer Dakota Stanley. Cheyenne Jackson was originally supposed to play Dakota Stanley, but when he arrived in California he learned that he had the flu. John Lloyd Young played Henri, "a retired wood shop teacher with an excellent singing voice", and Victor Garber and Debra Monk played Will's parents. Morrison was "thrilled" by Garber's casting, having been a longstanding fan of his. Josh Groban received special guest star billing, playing, in Colfer's words, "himself as this ignorant asshole". Morrison's rapping in the episode was an already acquired skill, with Gilsig commenting: "He can do it. It didn't look like a joke, it actually looked totally authentic, and he was fantastic. I think he has just an amazing musical range. People like that who have been singing their whole lives, they have such a command of that." Riley deemed Kurt's coming out in the episode "very emotional" and "one of [her] favorite scenes". Colfer described the scene as "very respectful and very touching ... very, very real and serious."

== Music ==
The episode features cover versions of "For He's a Jolly Good Fellow", "This Is How We Do It" by Montell Jordan, "Poison" by Bell Biv DeVoe, "Mercy" by Duffy, "Bust Your Windows" by Jazmine Sullivan, "I Wanna Sex You Up" by Color Me Badd and an instrumental performance of "La Camisa Negra" by Juanes. Studio recordings of "Bust Your Windows" and "Mercy" were released as singles, available for digital download. "Bust Your Windows" is also featured on the soundtrack album Glee: The Music, Volume 1, with a studio recording of "I Wanna Sex You Up" included as a bonus track on discs purchased from Target.

== Reception ==
=== Ratings ===
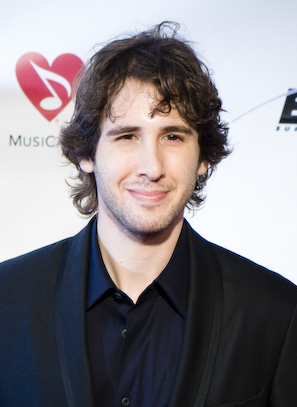
Mike Hale of The New York Times named Josh Groban's cameo appearance the highlight of the episode.

"Acafellas" was watched by 6.69 million US viewers and attained a 3.2/9 Nielsen rating/share in the 18–49 demographic. It was the tenth most watched show in Canada for the week, with 1.44 million viewers. In the UK, the episode was shown straight after the pilot episode, and was watched by 1.68 million viewers (1.29 million on E4, and 398,000 on timeshift), becoming the most-watched show on cable for the week.

=== Critical reception ===
The episode received mixed reviews from critics. Tim Stack for Entertainment Weekly reviewed the episode positively, deeming it potentially even better than the season premiere. Stack wrote that the best aspect of the episode was the focus placed on previously more minor characters, such as Puck, Mercedes and Kurt. He praised Lynch as Sue and wrote, "Stephen Tobolowsky’s Sandy is also becoming one of the most reliable characters for great lines and laughs." He was disappointed that Garber did not sing in his role as Will's father, but hoped he would return for future episodes. Raymund Flandez of The Wall Street Journal praised Riley's rendition of "Bust Your Windows" as "showstopping", Vocal Adrenaline's "Mercy" as "leg-splits-over-shoulders exciting", and deemed the Acafellas performance of "I Wanna Sex You Up" "corny" but noted: "this is about high school. Corny is de rigueur." Shawna Malcom for the Los Angeles Times wrote that although "Bust Your Windows" was "over the top [...] the emotion behind the whole thing felt appropriately real."

Mike Hale of The New York Times was critical of the episode, discussing the show's "increasingly rapid march toward Hallmark country." He commented that while "Acafellas" did not match the standard of the pilot episode, it was funnier than "Showmance", and praised the return of Stephen Tobolowsky as Sandy Ryerson. Hale called Groban's cameo the "most fun of all" in the episode, but overall noted that: "The humor can’t make up for the lack of big production numbers [...] The problem for this show is always going to be how to fill the gaps between songs. A lot of the current plot lines, like Will and his wife's phantom baby, are already getting old, so it would behoove the producers to keep those gaps as short as possible." Rachel Ray, reviewing the episode for The Independent deemed Glee "overhyped [...] uninspired, confusing and with a simple plot to boot." Ray wrote, Glee's "upbeat message" was "overridden by the show's attempt to be darker than the run-of-the mill high school drama." As with Hale, Ray commented that: "Music should be the redeeming feature of Glee but it's not, because the viewer never gets a satisfying taste of the cast members' musical talents". Shawna Malcom criticized Terri and Will's characterization in the episode, deeming Terri "beyond annoying", but wrote: "I have confidence that creator Ryan Murphy will flesh out Jessalyn Gilsig’s character over time. Her seemingly sincere apology to Will for not being more supportive of his boy band was a nice first step." Of Will, Malcom posed the question: "didn’t it feel as though his commitment to the glee club melted away rather quickly? [...] How could he turn his back so easily?" More positively, Malcom called Kurt's coming out scene "lovely". She wrote that Groban's appearance was "laugh out loud" funny, while Stack commented: "It was a little random, but it's all worth it for the scene when Groban was hitting on Will's mom."
