= Zack Lively =

American actor (born 1987)

- Born: March 20, 1987 (age 39); Nampa, Idaho, U.S.
- Occupation: Actor

Zack Lively (born March 20, 1987) is an American actor best known for his role as Heath on the ABC Family show GRΣΣK. Lively was born in Nampa, Idaho. He has also appeared in numerous television movies.

== Filmography ==
=== Film ===
Year	Title	Role	Notes
2016	Do Over	Ryan King	

=== Television ===
Year	Title	Role	Notes
2007	The Suite Life of Zack & Cody	Benji	Episode: "Health & Fitness"
2007	That's So Suite Life of Hannah Montana	Benji	Television film
2007	Passions	Harry	2 episodes
2007–2011	Greek	Heath	42 episodes
2008	Cavemen	Trent	2 episodes
2009	Heroes	Rahul	Episode: "Into Asylum"
2009	Glee	Lipoff	Episode: "Mash-Up"
2009	Three Rivers	Chad	Episode: "Code Green"
2010	Cold Case	Kevin Harkin	Episode: "The Good Soldier"
2010	NCIS	Conrad Zuse	Episode: "Worst Nightmare"
2013	Off Season: The Lex Morrison Story	Kirby	Television film
2014	Rescuing Madison	Jordan Vanderpool	Television film
TBA	Nuns with Guns	Nice Guy Neal	Television film
