= Home (Glee) =

- Glee episode
- Episode no.: Season 1 Episode 16
- Directed by: Paris Barclay
- Written by: Brad Falchuk
- Production code: 1ARC15
- Original air date: April 27, 2010

Guest appearances
- Jonathan Groff as Jesse St. James; Kristin Chenoweth as April Rhodes; Mike O'Malley as Burt Hummel; Romy Rosemont as Carole Hudson; Michael Benjamin Washington as Tracey Pendergrass; Naya Rivera as Santana Lopez; Heather Morris as Brittany Pierce; Harry Shum, Jr. as Mike Chang; Dijon Talton as Matt Rutherford; Lauren Potter as Becky Jackson

Episode chronology
← Previous "The Power of Madonna"	Next → "Bad Reputation"
- Glee season 1

"Home" is the sixteenth episode of the American television series Glee. The episode premiered on the Fox network on April 27, 2010. It was directed by Paris Barclay and written by series creator Brad Falchuk. "Home" sees new cheerleader Mercedes Jones (Amber Riley) deal with body image issues, while Kurt Hummel (Chris Colfer) sets his dad and Finn Hudson's mom together, in an attempt to get closer to Finn (Cory Monteith), and club director Will Schuester (Matthew Morrison) is reunited with his friend April Rhodes (Kristin Chenoweth). Chenoweth first appeared in Glee in the episode "The Rhodes Not Taken". She enjoyed the role of April so much that she agreed to return for "Home", and has expressed an interest in reappearing in the future.

The episode features cover versions of five songs, all of which were released as singles, available for digital download, and four of which are included on the soundtrack album Glee: The Music, Volume 3 – Showstoppers. "Home" was watched by 12.18 million American viewers and received mixed reviews from critics. Both Gerrick D. Kennedy of the Los Angeles Times and Tim Stack of Entertainment Weekly recommended that Chenoweth receive an Emmy nomination for her performance, and Mark A. Perigard of the Boston Herald opined that the episode itself should be submitted for Emmy consideration. Jean Bentley of MTV felt that Chenoweth was overused in the episode, however, and criticized the songs performed as being unrecognizable to younger viewers. Emily VanDerWerff of The A.V. Club felt that the episode was poorly balanced, and Bobby Hankinson of the Houston Chronicle deemed "Home" the weakest episode of Glee thus far.

== Plot ==
In preparation for an interview with Splits Magazine, cheerleading coach Sue Sylvester (Jane Lynch) demands that new cheerleader Mercedes Jones (Amber Riley) lose ten pounds in a week. She reserves the school auditorium for cheer practice, so glee club director Will Schuester (Matthew Morrison) has to find the club a new rehearsal space. He visits a local roller rink where he finds former glee club member April Rhodes (Kristin Chenoweth), who tells him that she is the mistress of the wealthy eighty-year-old tycoon who owns the rink. Upon learning that Will is looking to sublet his apartment, April invites herself to visit. After spending the night sharing a bed, Will forbids April from staying over again and tells her she is worth more than being a mistress. April says she will break up with her tycoon.

Mercedes struggles to eat healthily and her mid-week weigh-in shows that she has gained two pounds. She begins extreme dieting and faints in the school cafeteria. Former cheerleading captain Quinn Fabray (Dianna Agron) sympathizes with Mercedes, commending her for being so comfortable in her own body and advising her not to let being a cheerleader detract from that. Though Mercedes is embarrassed, Quinn tells her that she is beautiful. On the day of the pep rally, Mercedes abandons the planned routine, and instead sings "Beautiful". The journalist from Splits Magazine assumes that Sue engineered the performance and expresses his admiration for her, promising her positive publicity from his article.

Glee club member Kurt Hummel (Chris Colfer) sets up his widower father Burt (Mike O'Malley) with Finn Hudson's (Cory Monteith) widowed mother Carole (Romy Rosemont). He believes that it will help him become closer to Finn, for whom he has feelings. Finn is upset when Carole sells their old furniture, and stops his late father's recliner from being sold. He is initially hostile to her dating someone new, but begins to bond with Burt over sports at a group dinner. Kurt feels left out, and later asks Finn to help him break up their parents. Finn initially agrees, but relents after Burt tells him that he loves Carole and would never hurt her. They watch a basketball game together and Finn allows Burt to sit in his father's recliner, while Kurt watches on sadly through the window.

When April attempts to break up with her tycoon, he has a stroke and dies. His wife gives April $2 million in hush money, and April uses some of it to buy the auditorium for the glee club. She plans to go to Broadway to launch the first all-white production of The Wiz.

== Production ==
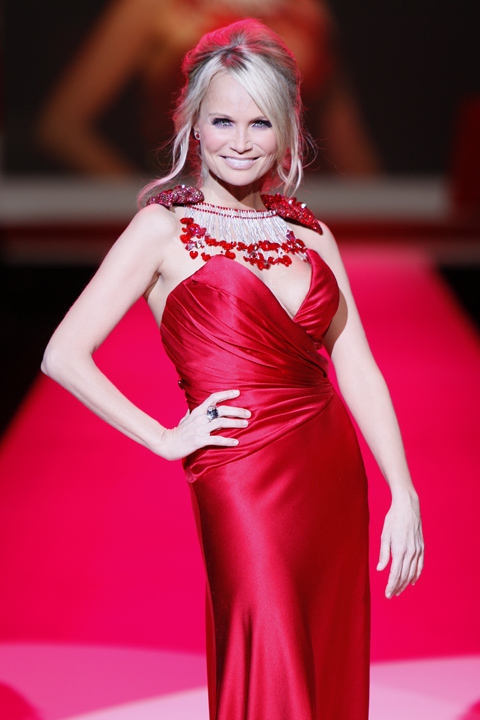
Kristin Chenoweth (pictured) reprised her role as April Rhodes in the episode.

"Home" was directed by Paris Barclay, who also directed "Wheels", Glee's ninth episode. It was written by series co-creator Brad Falchuk, who deemed the episode potentially the best of the series so far. "Home" sees the return of guest star Kristin Chenoweth, who first appeared in episode five, "The Rhodes Not Taken", as former glee club member April Rhodes. Prior to her first appearance, Chenoweth was already acquainted with Glee creator Ryan Murphy, having appeared in his 2006 film Running with Scissors. Murphy commented that he loves writing for Chenoweth, and both he and Chenoweth expressed their desire for April to return to Glee in the future, with Chenoweth stating: "This part is like nothing I've had the chance to do on TV." It was confirmed in October 2009 that Chenoweth would reprise the role of April later in the first season, and on March 14, 2010 that her return would occur in "Home".

While Glee also features Chenoweth's former Wicked co-star Idina Menzel as recurring character Shelby Corcoran, the producers declined to give the two scenes together, explaining that the series is story-driven, and as re-uniting the two on-screen did not work for storytelling purposes, it was deemed unnecessary. Of Chenoweth's future with Glee beyond "Home", Falchuk commented that the producers want to "have her around as much as possible", and although no plans have been solidified, she may return in the second season. He expanded: "[When] you have talents like that, it's very hard to not want them back. The one advantage we have, I think, is that we have so many incredibly talented people in our … cast that … we don't need [guest actors] as much. But there are certain very special people that, of course, you'd always be interested in."

The episode features a cover version of "A House Is Not a Home", performed by Colfer and Monteith, as well as a mash-up of "A House Is Not a Home" and "One Less Bell to Answer", performed by Chenoweth and Morrison. Morrison and Chenoweth also duet on The Pointer Sisters' version of "Fire". In keeping with the "home" theme of the episode, Mötley Crüe's ballad "Home Sweet Home" (and also "Heart of Glass" by Blondie, although this isn't about home) can be heard in the roller rink scene, but was not covered by the cast. Chenoweth performs "Home" from The Wiz, and Riley sings "Beautiful" by Christina Aguilera. The songs performed were all released as singles, available for digital download. Each track except "Fire" and "Home Sweet Home" is also included on the album Glee: The Music, Volume 3 – Showstoppers.

== Reception ==
=== Ratings ===
In its original broadcast, "Home" was watched by 12.18 million American viewers and attained a 5.2/13 rating/share in the 18-49 demographic. In the United Kingdom, the episode was watched by 1.91 million viewers and was the second most-watched show of the week on the non-terrestrial channels, beaten only by Britain's Got More Talent. In Canada, Glee was watched by 2.16 million viewers, making Glee the tenth most-viewed program of the week. In Australia, the episode lead in its timeslot in all key demographics, and was watched by 1.3 million viewers, making Glee the 16th most-viewed show of the week.

=== Critical response ===
"Home" received mixed reviews from critics. Gerrick D. Kennedy of the Los Angeles Times deemed it the series' most emotional episode, and his favorite next to "Wheels". Kennedy praised O'Malley's performance as "nothing short of perfection" and recommended that Chenoweth receive an Emmy nomination for her performance. Tim Stack of Entertainment Weekly concurred that Chenoweth's performance was Emmy-worthy, though felt she may have been slightly overused in the episode. Stack noted that he did not love "Home" upon his first viewing, but praised it for adding depth to the characters and tackling body image and sexuality issues. Rick Bentley of McClatchy Newspapers called the episode "as perfect as television can get", praising Colfer's performance and also deeming him deserving of an Emmy nomination. Mark A. Perigard of the Boston Herald similarly assessed that "Home" is: "the strongest episode of the season to date, the one Fox should submit for Emmy consideration." Perigard was impressed by the range shown by O'Malley, and opined that the episode as a whole had no low-points.

In contrast, Jean Bentley of MTV described "Home" as "an hour of television better suited for Internet surfing than actually paying attention." She criticized the songs as being unrecognizable to younger viewers, and called the main plots "emotional doozies, with not much comic relief in between." Bentley felt that Chenoweth was overused, and called her appearance in the episode "nonsensical and unnecessary". Emily VanDerWerff of The A.V. Club graded the episode "C". She felt that the three main plot strands were poorly balanced, resulting in an episode with "powerful moments that drown as they're nearly subsumed by everything else going on." VanDerWerff criticized Mercedes' storyline as being too abrupt, and deemed her performance of "Beautiful": "so forced that it loses any power it might have from what's a genuinely nice arrangement of the song." Finally, she expressed her concern that the prevalence of songs in Glee may detract from the quality of the show. Bobby Hankinson of the Houston Chronicle also criticized the episode, deeming it the weakest of the series so far, and one that left him underwhelmed.
