= Mash-Up (Glee) =

- Glee episode
- Episode no.: Season 1 Episode 8
- Directed by: Elodie Keene
- Written by: Ian Brennan
- Production code: 1ARC07
- Original air date: October 21, 2009

Guest appearances
- Patrick Gallagher as Ken Tanaka; Bill A. Jones as Rod Remington; Gina Hecht as Mrs. Puckerman; Naya Rivera as Santana Lopez; Heather Morris as Brittany Pierce; Harry Shum Jr. as Mike Chang; Dijon Talton as Matt Rutherford; Max Adler as Dave Karofsky; Earlene Davis as Andrea Carmichael; James Earl as Azimio

Episode chronology
| ← Previous "Throwdown" | Next → "Wheels" |
- Glee season 1

"Mash-Up" is the eighth episode of the American television series Glee. The episode premiered on the Fox network on October 21, 2009. It was written by series co-creator Ian Brennan and directed by Elodie Keene. The episode sees glee club director Will Schuester (Matthew Morrison) attempt to create a wedding medley in the style of a mash-up for his colleagues Emma (Jayma Mays) and Ken (Patrick Gallagher). Students Finn (Cory Monteith) and Quinn (Dianna Agron) find that they are no longer considered popular, while glee club members Rachel (Lea Michele) and Puck (Mark Salling) become romantically involved, as do cheerleading coach Sue Sylvester (Jane Lynch) and local news anchor Rod Remington (Bill A. Jones).

The episode features covers of five songs. Studio recordings of three of the songs were released as singles, available for digital download, and three are included on the album Glee: The Music, Volume 1. Neil Diamond was hesitant about licensing his song "Sweet Caroline" to the show, but was convinced by series music producer P.J. Bloom and ultimately enjoyed the performance given by Salling. The episode was watched by 7.24 million US viewers. Musical performances received mixed reviews from critics. The Wall Street Journal's Raymund Flandez described "Mash-Up" as a "turning point" for Glee, praising the episode for its character development.

== Plot ==
Football coach Ken Tanaka (Patrick Gallagher) and guidance counselor Emma Pillsbury (Jayma Mays) ask glee club director Will Schuester (Matthew Morrison) to create a mash-up for their wedding, using "Thong Song" and "I Could Have Danced All Night" from My Fair Lady. Ken senses that Emma would rather be with Will instead of him, so he gives the football-playing glee club members an ultimatum by scheduling an extra football practice on the same day as glee rehearsals.

Finn Hudson (Cory Monteith) and Quinn Fabray (Dianna Agron) have slushies thrown in their faces by other students, who want to take them down now that their high social status as football quarterback and head cheerleader has slipped because of Quinn's pregnancy and their membership in the glee club. Puck's (Mark Salling) mother (Gina Hecht) encourages him to date a Jewish girl, and he decides to court Rachel Berry (Lea Michele). At first she excuses herself by saying she needs a strong male who can perform a solo. As a result, Puck sings "Sweet Caroline" as his first solo for the glee club, dedicating it to Rachel and sealing the relationship. The two ultimately break up as a result of Rachel's feelings for Finn and Puck's feelings for Quinn.

Cheerleading coach Sue Sylvester (Jane Lynch) falls in love with Rod Remington (Bill A. Jones), a television news anchor on the program where she has an opinion segment, and makes amends with Will. However, her relationship fails when she discovers that Rod is cheating on her and, returning to form, Sue removes Quinn from the cheerleading squad because of her pregnancy.

Although Finn has chosen to stay on the football team, all the other dual members instead quit to remain in the glee club. Ken reverses his ultimatum after a conversation with a dismayed Finn and cancels the extra practice, allowing the football players to again do both activities. Meanwhile, Will and Emma spend more time together while Will prepares the mash-up, and soon realize they have strong feelings for one another. Will decides to remove himself from the equation and later tells Emma and Ken that he will not be able to create their mash-up.

== Production ==
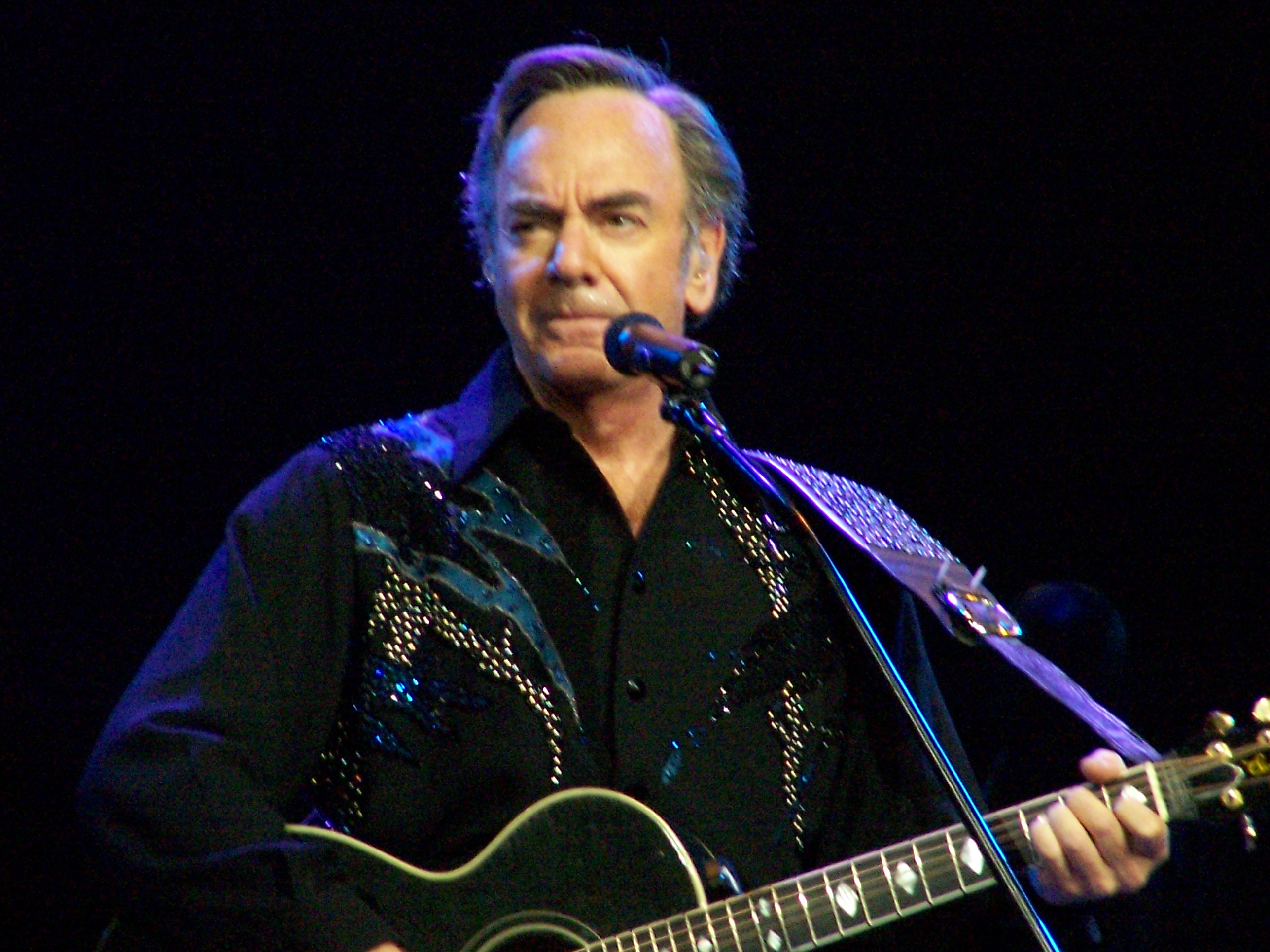
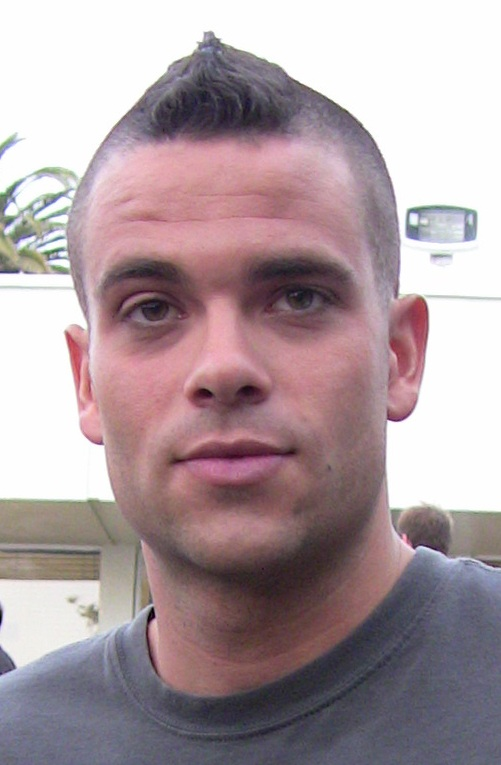
Neil Diamond (left/top) was initially reluctant to license "Sweet Caroline" to Glee, but he did allow it and enjoyed Mark Salling's (right/bottom) cover of the song.

"Mash-Up" was written by series creator Ian Brennan and directed by Elodie Keene. Recurring characters who appear in the episode are glee club members Brittany Pierce (Heather Morris), Santana Lopez (Naya Rivera), Mike Chang (Harry Shum Jr.) and Matt Rutherford (Dijon Talton), athletes Lipoff (Zack Lively), Dave Karofsky (Max Adler) and Azimio (James Earl, III), football coach Ken Tanaka (Gallagher), and local news anchors Rod Remington (Jones) and Andrea Carmichael (Earlene Davis). Gina Hecht guest-stars as Puck's mother.

The episode features covers of "Bust a Move" by Young MC, Sisqó's "Thong Song", Neil Diamond's "Sweet Caroline", "I Could Have Danced All Night" from the musical My Fair Lady, and "What a Girl Wants" by Christina Aguilera. An instrumental version of "Sing, Sing, Sing (With a Swing)" by Louis Prima is used in the scene which sees Will teach Sue how to swing dance. Diamond had some reluctance over licensing "Sweet Caroline" to the show, and retracted clearance after the performance had already been recorded. Glee's music supervisor P.J. Bloom was able to convince him to reverse his decision, and Diamond went on to also license his song "Hello Again" for use on the show at a later date. Following the episode's broadcast, Diamond posted his approval on the social networking website Twitter, writing: "Hey, so who's this guy Puck singing 'Sweet Caroline' so good, so good, so good on #Glee? Loved it!!"

Studio recordings of "Bust a Move", "Thong Song" and "Sweet Caroline" were released as singles, available for digital download. "Bust a Move" charted at number 93 in the US and 78 in Canada, while "Sweet Caroline" charted at number 34 in the US, 22 in Canada and 37 in Australia. "Bust a Move" and "Sweet Caroline" are included on the album Glee: The Music, Volume 1, with a studio recording of "I Could Have Danced All Night" included as a bonus track on discs purchased from Target.

== Reception ==
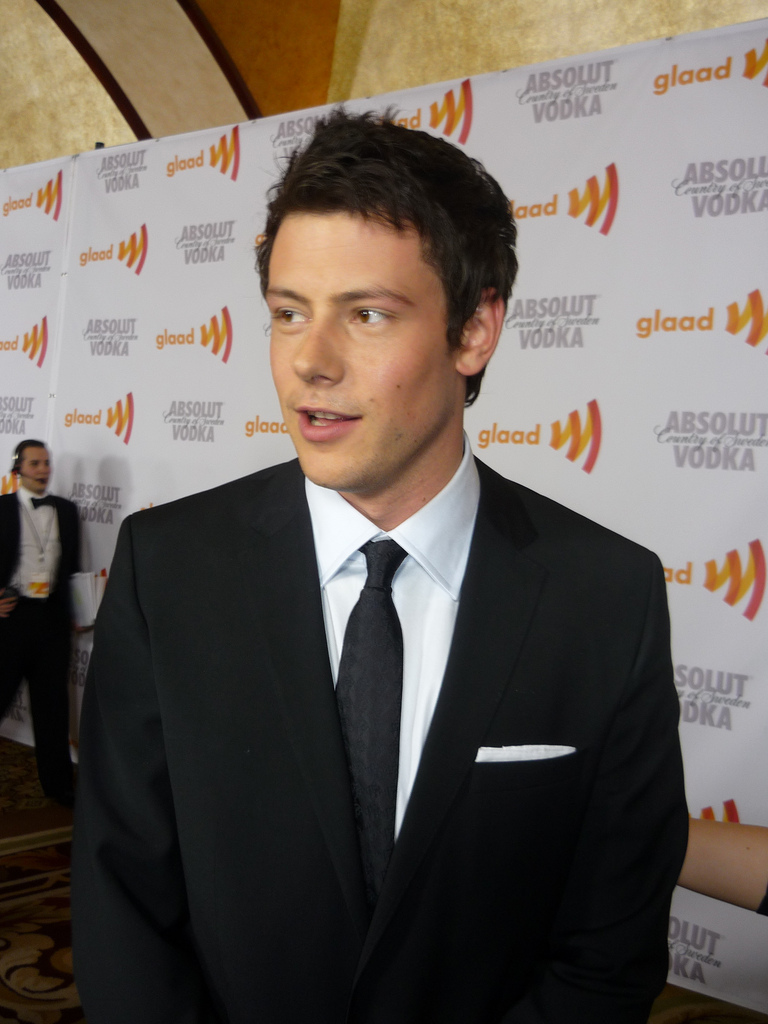
Cory Monteith's vocal performance in the episode was criticized by Joal Ryan of E! Online, who felt that "Monteith was so Auto-Tuned he sounded like Cher."

"Mash-Up" was watched by 7.24 million US viewers, and attained a 3.2/8 rating/share in the 18-49 demographic. It was the nineteenth most watched show in Canada for the week, with 1.52 million viewers. In the UK, the episode was watched by 2.053 million viewers (1.601 million on E4, and 452,000 on E4 +1), becoming the most-watched show on E4 and E4 +1 for the week, and one of the most-watched shows on cable for the week.

Raymund Flandez of The Wall Street Journal described the episode as "a turning point for Glee", commenting that although there had previously been criticism of many of the characters for being "one note", this episode demonstrated that was not the case, showing that Will has a playful side, Sue has feelings, and Puck is able to "emerge from his bonehead-punk exterior". Andrea Reiher of Zap2it was glad that Will's wife Terri did not appear in the episode, commenting: "I like Jessalyn Gilsig but that character drives me outhouse-rat crazy." Eric Goldman for IGN rated the episode 8.2/10, writing that he wished Sue's relationship with Rod could have lasted more than one episode, as: "it would have been amusing to see happy, in love Sue a bit longer, before her inevitable return to evil."

Musical performances in "Mash-Up" received mixed reviews. Joal Ryan for E! Online criticized the show's "overproduced soundtrack", writing that Monteith was being edited to sound like Cher, and that when Morrison sang "The Thong Song" and "Bust a Move", "he sounded like he was in a music video, not a suburban high school." He enjoyed Michele's "What a Girl Wants", calling her singing "raw and lovely". Entertainment Weekly's Michael Slezak criticized the "Bust A Move" performance, writing that Morrison gave a "pale imitation" of the Young M.C. original. He was slightly more positive regarding the "Thong Song" performance, feeling that Morrison had "a slightly less overwrought vocal than Sisqó", and observed that Salling did "more than a serviceable job" on "Sweet Caroline". Fellow Entertainment Weekly writer Dan Snierson called Morrison's performances "pretty impressive", and MTV's Aly Semigran also enjoyed them, writing: "We want more!". Goldman too was positive regarding Morrison's performances, noting: "There is of course something completely dorky about seeing this guy perform these songs, but Morrison infuses Will with such enjoyment in what he's doing, he completely sells it."

I will go to the animal shelter and get you a kitty cat. I will let you fall in love with that kitty cat; and then on some dark cold night, I will steal away into your home, and punch you in the face.

— Sue Sylvester, Glee, Season 1 Episode 8: "Mash-Up"

Glee's writers have also been praised for the episode's comedic content; one particular joke (performed by Lynch as Sue) was called an "instant classic" by television writer/producer Jane Espenson. According to Espenson:

"The beauty of the joke is that ... [it] WANTS you to get ahead of it, and then subverts your expectation. This is extremely hard to pull off because you have to make certain that the audience is going to get ahead of the joke, but you can't be so obvious about it that you know they're going to anticipate the switch-up. This particular version is a thing of joy. I think a lot of what makes it work is the violence of the final image—you lose nothing of the force of the threat by not getting to any violence against the kitten."

— Jane Espenson, Personal Blog -- "The Dangling Kitten"
