= Funk (Glee) =

- Glee episode
- Episode no.: Season 1 Episode 21
- Directed by: Elodie Keene
- Written by: Ian Brennan
- Production code: 1ARC19
- Original air date: June 1, 2010

Guest appearances
- Jonathan Groff as Jesse St. James; Idina Menzel as Shelby Corcoran; Iqbal Theba as Principal Figgins; Stephen Tobolowsky as Sandy Ryerson; Naya Rivera as Santana Lopez; Kent Avenido as Howard Bamboo; Josh Sussman as Jacob Ben Israel; Keisuke Hoashi as Peter Gow; Brian McGovern as Brett Paxton; Tonita Castro as Imelda; Heather Morris as Brittany Pierce; Harry Shum, Jr. as Mike Chang; Dijon Talton as Matt Rutherford

Episode chronology
← Previous "Theatricality"	Next → "Journey to Regionals"
- Glee season 1

"Funk" is the twenty-first episode of the American television series Glee. The episode was written by series creator Ian Brennan and directed by Elodie Keene. It premiered on the Fox network on June 1, 2010, and was watched by 9 million viewers. In "Funk", New Directions is intimidated by rival glee club Vocal Adrenaline. Jesse St. James (Jonathan Groff) defects back to Vocal Adrenaline, and New Directions explores funk music, knowing it is their rival club's weakness. The episode features cover versions of six songs, all of which were released as singles, available for download, and two of which are included on the soundtrack album Glee: The Music, Volume 3 Showstoppers.

The episode received mixed reviews from critics. Lisa Respers France of CNN and Blair Baldwin of Zap2it both received the episode positively. Emily St. James of The A.V. Club, Entertainment Weekly's Tim Stack and James Poniewozik of Time highlighted continuity issues with the show, while VanDerWerff and Henrik Batallones of BuddyTV deemed "Funk" a set-up episode for the season finale. Bobby Hankinson of the Houston Chronicle gave a more positive review, but still found "Funk" lacking compared to previous episodes, a sentiment shared by Aly Semigran of MTV.

== Plot ==
Jesse (Jonathan Groff) returns to rival glee club Vocal Adrenaline, claiming that he was not appreciated in New Directions. In a successful attempt at intimidation ahead of the Regionals competition, Vocal Adrenaline gives a performance of "Another One Bites the Dust" in the McKinley High auditorium, and toilet paper New Directions' choir room. The New Directions members become depressed, and club director Will Schuester (Matthew Morrison) tries to reinvigorate them by asking them to perform funk numbers. Quinn (Dianna Agron) performs "It's a Man's Man's Man's World" to vent her frustration of being an unwed teenage mother. Mercedes (Amber Riley) sympathizes with Quinn and invites her to move in with her. Later, Mercedes, Puck (Mark Salling) and Finn (Cory Monteith) perform "Good Vibrations" as their own "funk" number, based on Marky Mark's band name being the Funky Bunch.

Will and Terri (Jessalyn Gilsig) finalize their divorce. Attempting to deal with his sorrow and cheerleading coach Sue Sylvester's (Jane Lynch) incessant bullying, Will seduces Sue with a performance of "Tell Me Something Good" and asks her out on a date, standing her up to humiliate her. Sue withdraws the cheerleading squad from the upcoming Nationals competition and becomes bed-bound. Will sees the negative impact on the cheerleaders and realizes that some of them might lose their college scholarships. Will knows that hurting his nemesis did not make him feel any better, and encourages her to be there for her girls. Sue reenters and wins Nationals, but later gives Will two options: either house her new trophy inside New Directions' choir room, or kiss her. As Will is about to kiss her, Sue backs out and decides she prefers that the trophy be set up in the choir room as a reminder of her superiority.

In retaliation to Vocal Adrenaline's vandalism, Puck and Finn slash the tires of their rivals' Range Rovers. Principal Figgins (Iqbal Theba) thinks they should be expelled, but Vocal Adrenaline director Shelby Corcoran (Idina Menzel) disagrees: she decides not to press charges, but she insists they pay for the damages. She then recommends taking the money out of Glee's budget, but Will says that the club will go bankrupt. Finn then says that he and Puck will get jobs, and Shelby agrees. They begin working with Terri at Sheets-N-Things. Expressing the dissatisfaction in their lives, Puck, Finn, Terri, customer Sandy Ryerson (Stephen Tobolowsky), and employee Howard Bamboo (Kent Avenido) perform "Loser" in a dream sequence. Terri finds that Finn reminds her of Will, and befriends him, helping him with his funk assignment.

Jesse further breaks Rachel's (Lea Michele) heart when he lures her to the parking lot, where he and the other Vocal Adrenaline members throw eggs at her, which leaves Rachel distraught. The male New Directions members, led by Puck, are talked out of violent retaliation by Will, and instead the group performs "Give Up the Funk" to show Vocal Adrenaline that they have not been defeated by their bullying. The performance intimidates their rivals, who unlike New Directions have never been able to master a funk number.

== Production ==
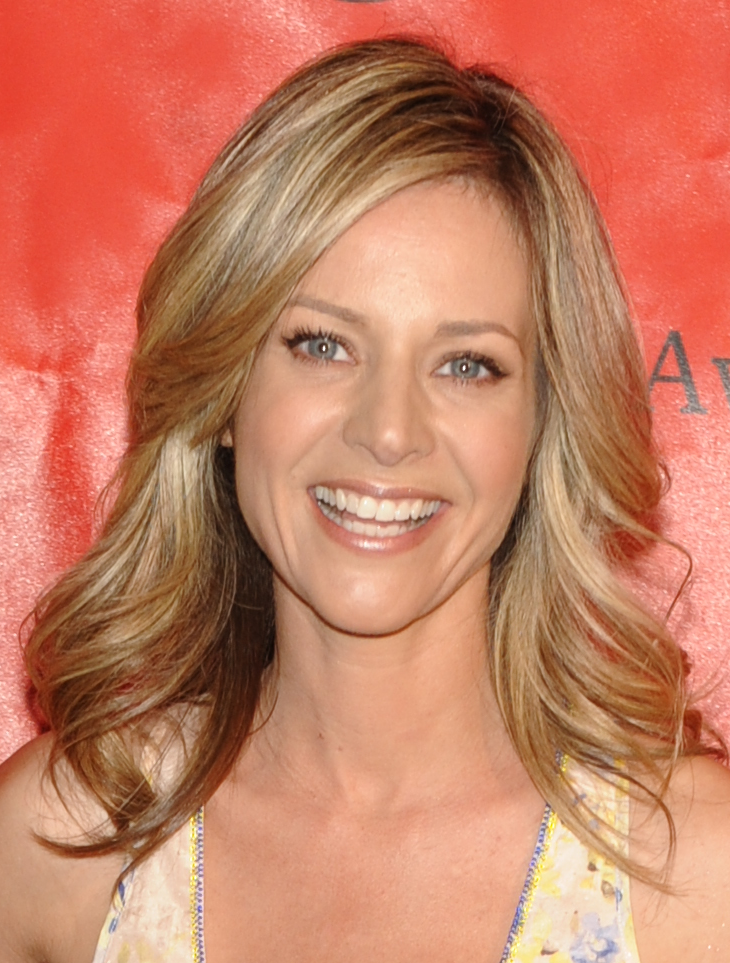
Terri (Gilsig, pictured) returns to the series in "Funk", beginning a friendship with Finn.

"Funk" was originally intended to air on May 25, 2010, but was switched in the schedule with the previous episode "Theatricality". Series creator Ryan Murphy has stated that there are three relationships which are the cornerstone of Glee: those between Finn and Rachel, Will and Emma (Jayma Mays), and Will and Sue. Murphy explained that Will's seduction of Sue in "Funk" is an attempt to get her to leave the Glee club alone, expanding: "I think he's just done getting pushed around by Sue, but they had great fun with that."

Will's wife, Terri, returns to the series in "Funk", giving her first vocal performance. Murphy planned a redemptive storyline for Terri, in which she realizes that Finn is similar to Will. He explained: "She met Will at 16, so she sees a way to redemption... a way to redo that relationship in a positive way [by acting] almost as Finn's guardian angel, his fairy godmother. She gives him proper moral advice." Murphy enjoyed seeing Gilsig and Monteith work together, so much so that he stated their friendship will continue into the show's second season. On June 2, 2010, Megan Masters of E! Online reported that Gilsig had yet to be officially invited back for the second season, but was confident that she would be. Discussing Terri's relationship with Finn, Gilsig explained: "She sees in Finn so much of what she saw in Will when she first met him because he's the same age as Will was. It's her way of remembering happier times—when she used to be kind to Will. And she realizes, here's a chance to be supportive of this kid."

The episode features cover versions of six songs: "Another One Bites the Dust" by Queen, "Tell Me Something Good" by Rufus, "Loser" by Beck, "It's a Man's Man's Man's World" by James Brown, "Good Vibrations" by Marky Mark and the Funky Bunch featuring Loleatta Holloway and "Give Up the Funk (Tear the Roof off the Sucker)" by Parliament". All of the songs performed in the episode were released as singles, available for download. "Loser" is Gilsig's only vocal performance on the show, and is included on the deluxe edition of the soundtrack album Glee: The Music, Volume 3 Showstoppers. "Give Up the Funk" is included on both the deluxe and standard editions of the album.

== Reception ==
In its original broadcast, "Funk" was watched by an average of 9 million American viewers. The episode began with a 3.6/10 rating/share in the 18–49 demographic, rising to 4.1/11 in the last 30 minutes. It was down 21% on the previous episode, but was Glee's best 18–49 rating for an episode not following American Idol. It was the third most-watched show of the week in the 18-49 demographic (losing to America's Got Talent the night of the broadcast), the highest scripted show, and the eleventh most-watched program amongst all viewers. "Funk" received mixed reviews from critics. CNN's Lisa Respers France called it "incredible", and was pleased to see New Directions performing funk music, although noted that she was "slightly disturbed" by Quinn's "weird" performance of "It's a Man's Man's Man's World" utilizing pregnant teenagers as backing dancers. In December 2012, TV Guide named Quinn's cover one of Glee's worst performances. Blair Baldwin of Zap2it stated: "While it didn't have the poignant vocals of previous episodes, it was fresh and fun...a nice change of pace for the series." Bobby Hankinson of the Houston Chronicle called it a "pretty good" and "solid" episode, albeit noting that it lacked the "emotional punch" of previous episodes.

Emily St. James of The A.V. Club graded the episode "C", writing that it felt like "a frantic attempt to raise a bunch of potential storylines for season two and an attempt to put things in place for the season finale". She criticized the show's lack of continuity, particularly with regard to the Jesse and Rachel storyline. Entertainment Weekly's Tim Stack also observed the lack of continuity in the Jesse storyline, calling it "slightly confusing" and "a little half-baked"; continuity errors in his storyline may have been the result of the change in episode broadcast order. He felt that the episode was "a slight let down", noting: "There wasn't as much tension as I would have hoped going into the finale but there were still plenty of fun moments to enjoy." James Poniewozik of Time attributed part of the episode's problems to it being "an episode that could air easily out of order", explaining: "Glee is a very serial show, after all, but this episode largely consisted of moments that felt dropped in and random, in a way that undermined even the good moments."

Henrik Batallones of BuddyTV deemed "Funk" a bridge between "Theatricality" and the season finale, writing: "It feels like the episode got itself in a funk, and when things get close to being awesome, it pulls back." Eric Goldman of IGN rated the episode 6.8/10 for "Passable", but deemed it the weakest episode of Glee thus far, while Gerrick D. Kennedy of the Los Angeles Times called it "just one big funked-up mess." Broadway World's Mary Hanrahan felt that: "While "Funk" had some redeeming, even charming, moments, it did nothing to make up for the perplexing episode that preceded it and ultimately left much to be desired." In contrast, Aly Semigran of MTV had enjoyed the preceding episode, yet still received "Funk" poorly, calling it: "a step down from last week's strong 'Theatricality'." As with Respers France, Semigran noted that Quinn's performance" felt a little uncomfortable and borderline 'offensive'." In contrast, Raymund Flandez of the Wall Street Journal enjoyed Quinn's song, which he called a "magnificent surprise", praising the "perfect jazzy–funk choreography". Flandez criticized the "Good Vibrations" performance, however, deeming it a "song so bad it can't be saved by irony or nostalgia", and felt that "Give Up the Funk" was "underdeveloped" asking: "Where's the soul? Anger? Passion? Emotion? Isn't that what this was supposed to be about?"
