= Showmance =

Romantic relationship between participants in a stage or screen production

A showmance (sometimes show-mance), also known as show romance, is a romance that develops between two individuals in theater, or on films and television series and between reality show contestants or participants for the running period of the show. When the two actively engage in a "made-up" situation, it can be called a fauxmance. It is also considered a neologism and its usage is gaining popularity in the media.

The term came to the attention of the mainstream on the non-scripted American television show Big Brother when it was first used by Will Kirby in 2001. It has been used in theater on stage for years. Then it moved to films, theater and scripted television. It is primarily entered into as a ploy to gain more public and media attention and, in case of television, more camera time during the run of a theater piece, or a television series. It may be also just a publicity stunt. Showmances during reality shows are often motivated by the participants' wanting popularity with the viewers for post-show success (as well as success during the show, if audience voting is a part of the format). In some competitive reality TV shows (Big Brother or Survivor), contestants often engaged in a showmance for strategic purposes. A showmance couple, by protecting each other and by voting together, maintaining power over the game’s political power structure. Sometimes, when an amorous relationship actually does continue after the end of a show, many people would still allege that it is "just a show" the two are putting on.

Showmance is a portmanteau of the words show and romance. With very few exceptions, almost all showmance cases end as soon as the theater piece, or the television series or reality show is over. Although mostly involving two persons, it may also possibly extend into a three-way showmance or foursome, often accompanied with real or acted rivalries and jealousies. Although mostly the relations involve partners of the opposite sex, at times, showmances may involve same-sex relations as well.

Often, a showmance occurs between two people playing lovers. The showmance could be a result of the close contact between the actors in such situations, or because of a confusion between real emotions and the character's emotions.

The term has moved to broader general use, describing any "contrived romance", also known as a relationship between two people, when either or both "act out" or fake being in love without meaning it, or in many cases with ulterior motives, like benefiting from the other party or misusing and abusing their feelings.

== In popular culture ==
- The second episode of Glee is entitled "Showmance". It aired on September 9, 2009.

== See also ==
- Bromance
- Womance
