= Showmance (Glee) =

- Glee episode
- Cheerleaders Santana, Quinn and Brittany perform "I Say a Little Prayer" auditioning for the glee club.
- Episode no.: Season 1 Episode 2
- Directed by: Ryan Murphy
- Written by: Ryan Murphy; Brad Falchuk; Ian Brennan
- Production code: 1ARC01
- Original air date: September 9, 2009
- Running time: 45 minutes

Guest appearances
- Patrick Gallagher as Ken Tanaka; Iqbal Theba as Principal Figgins; Jennifer Aspen as Kendra Giardi; Romy Rosemont as Carole Hudson; Naya Rivera as Santana Lopez; Heather Morris as Brittany Pierce; Kenneth Choi as Dr. Wu; Valorie Hubbard as Peggy; Michael Loeffelholz as Phil Giardi; Josh Sussman as Jacob Ben Israel

Episode chronology
| ← Previous "Pilot" | Next → "Acafellas" |
- Glee season 1

"Showmance" is the second episode of the American television series Glee. The episode premiered on the Fox network on September 9, 2009. It was written by series co-creators Ryan Murphy, Brad Falchuk and Ian Brennan and directed by Murphy. The episode sees the glee club attempt to recruit new members by performing Salt-n-Pepa's "Push It" in a school assembly. It advances the love triangles between Rachel (Lea Michele), Finn (Cory Monteith) and Quinn (Dianna Agron) and Emma (Jayma Mays), Will (Matthew Morrison) and Terri (Jessalyn Gilsig), and sees antagonist Sue Sylvester (Jane Lynch) begin to conspire against the club.

The episode features covers of six songs. Studio recordings of three of the songs performed were released as singles, available for digital download. Three of the tracks also appear on the album Glee: The Music, Volume 1. "Showmance" introduces recurring cast members Jennifer Aspen, Kenneth Choi, and Heather Morris, and guest-stars Valorie Hubbard.

The episode was watched by 7.3 million US viewers, and was the best-received scripted premiere by Fox in three years. The performance of Kanye West's "Gold Digger" in particular drew positive reviews from critics, with Jarett Wieselman of the New York Post and Entertainment Weekly's Tim Stack comparing the episode favorably to the series' pilot episode. Brian Lowry for Variety, however, received the episode poorly, deeming the show a one-hit wonder, while Robert Lloyd of the Los Angeles Times noted weaknesses in the adult characters.

== Plot ==
Cheerleading coach Sue Sylvester (Jane Lynch) informs glee club director Will Schuester (Matthew Morrison) that New Directions must have twelve members to be eligible to compete at Regionals. Will decides to have New Directions perform in a school assembly, hoping to recruit new members. The group is opposed to his choice of song—"Le Freak" by Chic—so as a compromise, Will suggests they also learn "Gold Digger" by Kanye West. Rachel Berry's (Lea Michele) crush on Finn Hudson (Cory Monteith) leads her to join the celibacy club, which he attends with his girlfriend, Quinn Fabray (Dianna Agron), who is head of the Cheerios. Rachel soon realizes that the celibacy club is really a place where teens try to get as physically close to each other as possible without technically engaging in any kind of sexual activity, and she impresses Finn by saying celibacy club doesn't work because it is normal for teenagers to want to have sex.

Rachel also convinces the Glee club members to secretly change their performance to "Push It" by Salt-n-Pepa to give audience members what they want, "sex". The song is well received by the student body, however complaints from parents lead Principal Figgins (Iqbal Theba) to compile a list of pre-approved, sanitary songs which New Directions must choose from in future. Will is angry with Rachel for her actions, and when Quinn and fellow cheerleaders Santana (Naya Rivera) and Brittany (Heather Morris) audition for the club with a tongue-in-cheek rendition of "I Say a Little Prayer", he gives Rachel's solo on "Don't Stop Believin'" to Quinn. Sue later recruits Quinn to help her bring the glee club down from the inside, angered because Figgins has cut some of her funds to finance the club.

At home, Will is being pushed by his wife, Terri (Jessalyn Gilsig), to find a second job so that they can afford to move into a new house before the birth of their child. He begins working at the school as a janitor after hours, and shares a romantic moment with guidance counselor Emma Pillsbury (Jayma Mays). Football coach Ken Tanaka (Patrick Gallagher) observes them, and warns Emma not to become Will's rebound girl. When Will asks her to meet with him after school again, Emma turns him down, having accepted a date with Ken. Terri discovers that she is actually experiencing a hysterical pregnancy, but she cannot bring herself to tell Will, so she lies to him that they are having a son. She tells him to quit working as a janitor, offering up use of her craft room as a nursery for the baby so they do not need to move.

Following a private rehearsal, Finn and Rachel kiss, and he is suddenly overwhelmed and experiences premature ejaculation. Embarrassed, he leaves, telling her to forget that their tryst happened, and goes back to Quinn. A dismayed Rachel later sings Rihanna's "Take a Bow" with Glee club members Mercedes (Amber Riley) and Tina (Jenna Ushkowitz) singing backup.

== Production ==
The first public screening of "Showmance" occurred in July 2009, at the Glee Comic-Con panel. Scott Collins of the Los Angeles Times wrote that turnout for the panel was standing-room only, and deemed the reception "enthusiastic". Recurring cast members who appear in the episode are Gallagher as football coach Ken Tanaka, Iqbal Theba as Principal Figgins, Jennifer Aspen as Terri's sister Kendra Giardi, Romy Rosemont as Finn's mother Carole Hudson, Ken Choi as Terri's OB/GYN Dr. Wu, and Rivera and Morris as new glee club members Santana Lopez and Brittany Pierce. Valorie Hubbard guest stars as Peggy.

It was revealed at the 2011 Glee Comic-Con panel that a scene had been written for this episode that featured Rachel's fathers, but it was subsequently cut from the script even though the actors had already been cast and reported for shooting.

== Music ==
The episode features cover versions of Kanye West's "Gold Digger", Salt-n-Pepa's "Push It", "Take a Bow" by Rihanna, "I Say a Little Prayer" by Dionne Warwick, Chic's "Le Freak", and "All by Myself" by Eric Carmen. Studio recordings of "Gold Digger", "Take a Bow" and "Push It" were released as singles, available for download. "Gold Digger" charted at number 59 in Australia, "Take a Bow" at number 38 in Australia, 73 in Canada and 46 in America, and "Push It" at number 60 in Australia. "Gold Digger" and "Take a Bow" are included on the album Glee: The Music, Volume 1, with a studio recording of "I Say a Little Prayer" included as a bonus track on discs purchased from iTunes. "Take a Bow" was offered for use in the episode at a reduced licensing rate, something which surprised Murphy, who believed he would not be able to secure the rights to the song. He stated: "Usually, people who have no. 1 hits, even if they give it to you, want hundreds of thousands of dollars, in my experience. But Rihanna gave it to us for a really good price. That's been one of the cool and surprising things about this experience, that these people that the cast and we really admire and respect have found out about the show and are supportive."

== Reception ==
"Showmance" averaged 7.3 million US viewers, making Glee the second most watched show of the evening after NBC's America's Got Talent. It achieved a 3.5/9 rating/share in the 18-49 demographic, making it Fox's best scripted premiere in three years. However, as Scott Collins for the Los Angeles Times noted, the other major networks besides Fox all opened the evening by airing a speech by President Barack Obama, disrupting regular viewing patterns. Furthermore, the official fall season had yet to begin, placing Glee against weaker competition in the ratings than the remainder of the season would experience. "Showmance" was the third most watched show in Canada for the week of broadcast, with 1.77 million viewers. In the UK, the episode was shown straight after the pilot episode, and was watched by 1.45 million viewers (1.22 million on E4, and 227,000 on timeshift), becoming the most-watched show on E4 for the week, and the most-watched show on cable for the week.

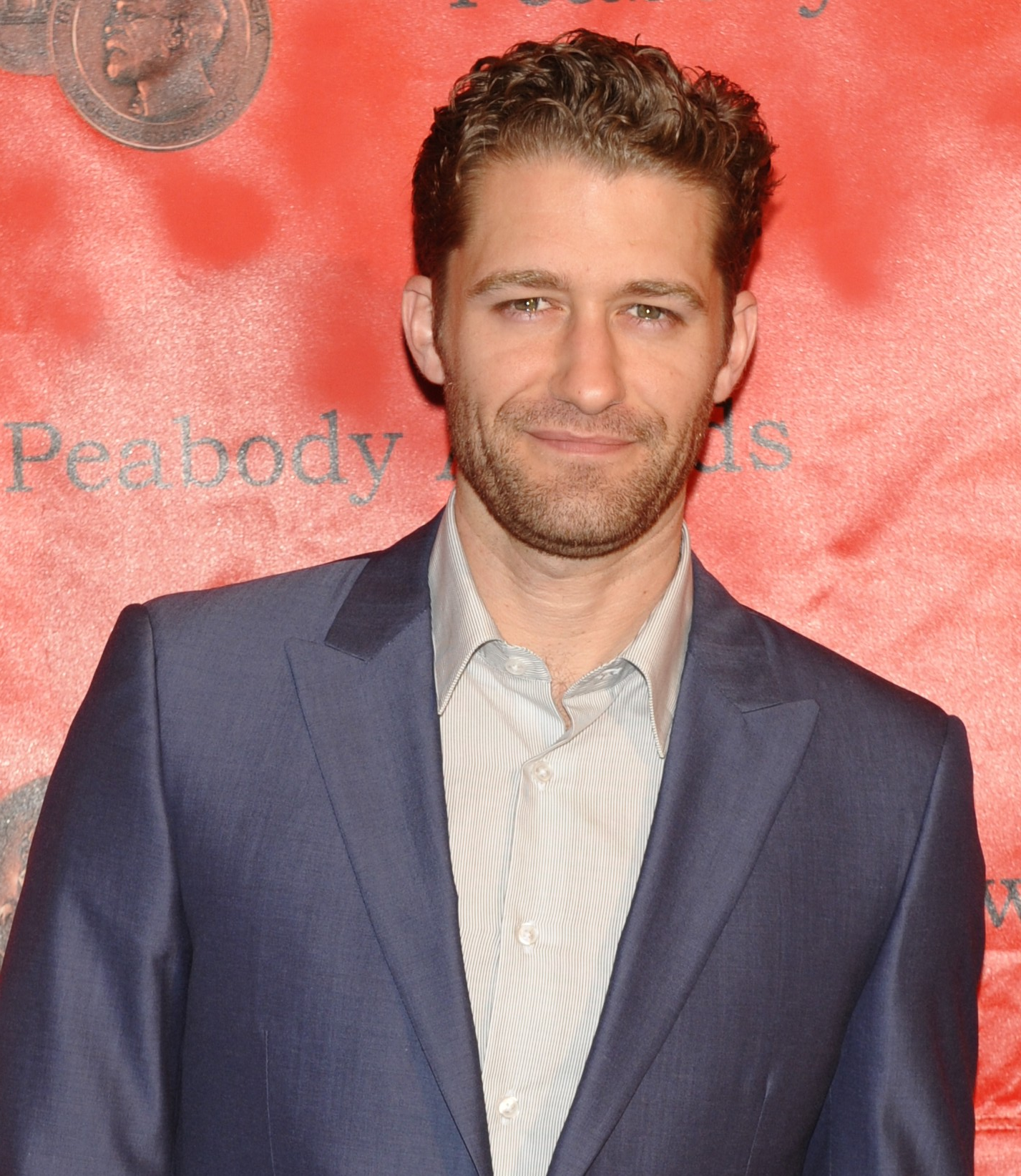
Morrison's performance of "Gold Digger" was well received by critics.

The episode received generally positive reviews from critics. Shawna Malcom for the Los Angeles Times wrote that with "Showmance", Glee: "admirably lived up to the promise of its pilot". Entertainment Weekly's Tim Stack called the episode "really really fun", observing that: "The quality seen in the pilot definitely does not waver. If anything, the show seems to be finding its footing and tone." David Hinckley of the Daily News rated the episode 4 out of 5 stars and commented: "Glee could have a hard time sustaining what it has set up. But the opening number gives us a rousing good show." The episode's musical numbers attracted positive reviews, particularly Will's rendition of "Gold Digger". Raymund Flandez for The Wall Street Journal praised this performance, also describing the group performance of "Push It" as "glorious in encapsulating every teenage horror". Discussing the performance of "Gold Digger", Dave Itzkoff for The New York Times wrote: "Outside of the catalog of 2 Live Crew, it's hard to imagine a song more inappropriate for a high school glee club [...] but the young misfits of the Fox comedy Glee somehow made it work."

Brian Lowry for Variety, however, criticized the episode. He wrote that Lynch's performance was "fitfully funny but usually just plain annoying", calling the pregnancy subplot "credulity-straining". Lowry praised Colfer and Michele, however stated that the show's talent was squandered by its "jokey, cartoonish, wildly uneven tone". He deemed the show a "one-hit wonder", writing that: "the musical numbers—generally less infectious and buoyant than the first time out—can’t compensate for overly broad characterizations and absurdly soapy situations." Robert Bianco for USA Today gave a mixed review, commenting: "It would be better if Glee had more control and fewer abrupt tonal shifts, but that's not the Glee we're getting — and maybe it wouldn't be Glee at all. It's not perfect, but in a sea of procedural conformity, Glee is its own weird, often enchanting little island escape." While Hank Stuever for The Washington Post praised the show's inclusion of adult storylines alongside teenage drama, Robert Lloyd for the Los Angeles Times felt that the adult characters "tend more to caricature than character", writing of Sue that: "the writing flattens her toward a single note. She's funny from line to line, but there is little to her besides tin-pot contrariness." The Chicago Tribune's Maureen Ryan commented similarly: "there's one big flaw in Glee [...] and it may be a harbinger of bad things to come. Will's wife, Terri (Jessalyn Gilsig), manages to drain all the fun out of Glee every time she appears." Ryan received the younger cast more positively, stating that there were "no weak links", and praising Colfer and Michele in particular.
