= Dijon Talton =

American actor and singer (born 1989)

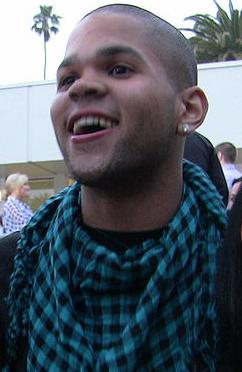
- Talton in 2009
- Born: Dijon Hendra Talton; September 17, 1989 (age 36); Los Angeles, California, U.S.
- Years active: 1998-present
- Relatives: La'Myia Good (cousin); Meagan Good (cousin)

Dijon Hendra Talton (born September 17, 1989) is an American producer, actor, singer and director. He won several awards as part of the cast of Glee, and has since continued to play roles on television and film, as well as producing through his company The Talton Company. In his projects, he typically works with his cousin Meagan Good.

== Early and personal life ==
Dijon Hendra Talton was born in Los Angeles, California, on September 17, 1989, to Len and Gina Talton. He has said that his older cousin Meagan Good is his "best friend" and was "like a second mother growing up".

In 2016, he was part of the Artistic Alliance for Justice campaign video encouraging black people to vote in the 2016 United States presidential election.

== Career ==
After playing the young fisherman who catches Tyra Banks in a McDonald's commercial in 1996, Talton had his first acting role in 1998, portraying the kid in L.A. Without a Map. In 2009, Talton played Matt Rutherford, a member of the glee club in the first season of Glee. He described his character as a fun person who always wanted to join the glee club but, as a member of the football team, felt this was unacceptable until quarterback Finn Hudson (Cory Monteith) did. He was a dancer on the show but never sang a solo on screen. As part of the main ensemble cast, he received a Screen Actors Guild Award and Peabody Award. He also toured with the cast in 2010. His next appearances on the show were in its final two episodes in 2015.

After Glee, Talton starred as Raven in I Will Follow, directed by Ava DuVernay, with Omari Hardwick, which was released in 2011. He released his debut music single "Wild Out" in 2012, with a music video directed by Meagan Good and starring Logan Browning, and "Shorty She Bad" with Jay Blaze in 2014. The "Shorty She Bad" music video premiered on Vibe before receiving airtime on MTV VOD. Talton starred as Kendall, a gay black man, in the Lena Waithe-produced television pilot Bros, which was picked up for development by HBO in 2014.

He took a supporting role, starring alongside Hardwick and Good in the 2018 Sundance Film Festival-premiered A Boy. A Girl. A Dream.. Talton then played Diggy in the 2018 movie Never Heard and Nate in 2021's Take Out Girl. He was also a producer of Take Out Girl, which was in competition for the Best Narrative Feature award at the 2020 American Black Film Festival. In July 2020, Talton launched a talk show, Cousins, with Meagan and La'Myia Good.

He started a production company, The Talton Company, as he wanted to see stories of black and brown people that are not stereotypical and that are more diverse. For the company, he is executive producer and director of the 2022 Allblk show À la carte with Meagan Good. The pilot episode was originally screened in 2019. The show is Talton's directorial debut, and he has said that "[he] wanted to direct Á La Carte because it's a good story. It's a story about human beings and how we're all flawed but still nuanced, graceful, and beautiful in the midst of it".
