= I Kissed a Girl (Glee) =

- Glee episode
- Episode no.: Season 3 Episode 7
- Directed by: Tate Donovan
- Written by: Matthew Hodgson
- Production code: 3ARC07
- Original air date: November 29, 2011

Guest appearances
- Idina Menzel as Shelby Corcoran; Mike O'Malley as Burt Hummel; Iqbal Theba as Principal Figgins; Dot-Marie Jones as Coach Beiste; Damian McGinty as Rory Flanagan; Vanessa Lengies as Sugar Motta; Lauren Potter as Becky Jackson; Josh Sussman as Jacob Ben Israel; Ivonne Coll as Alma Lopez; Eric Bruskotter as Cooter Menkins; Jim Gleason as the doctor; Jan Hoag as Roberta; David Wilson Page as Josh Coleman; Mary Gillis as Mrs. Hagberg

Episode chronology
← Previous "Mash Off"	Next → "Hold On to Sixteen"
- Glee season 3

"I Kissed a Girl" is the seventh episode of the third season of the American musical television series Glee and the fifty-first overall. Written by Matthew Hodgson and directed by Tate Donovan, the episode aired on Fox in the United States on November 29, 2011, and featured the election for a new senior class president at McKinley High. It also covered the special congressional election between Sue Sylvester (Jane Lynch) and Burt Hummel (Mike O'Malley), plus repercussions from the outing of Santana (Naya Rivera) during the congressional campaign.

The episode as a whole received mixed to negative reviews from critics, though several praised Santana's scene with her grandmother. The music was viewed more favorably by reviewers, and earned mixed to positive reactions. Six songs are covered in the episode, including Katy Perry's "I Kissed a Girl". All six were released as downloadable singles, and five of them charted on the Billboard Hot 100.

Upon its initial airing, this episode was viewed by 7.9 million American viewers and garnered a 3.2/8 Nielsen rating/share in the 18–49 demographic. The total viewership and ratings were up from the previous episode, "Mash Off", which had aired two weeks before.

== Plot ==
Santana (Naya Rivera) is about to be suspended for hitting Finn (Cory Monteith), but he claims it was merely a stage slap. He then blackmails Santana into having her glee club, the Troubletones, temporarily meet with her former club, New Directions, so he can show her how they all support her. Kurt (Chris Colfer) and Blaine (Darren Criss) sing "Perfect" to her, which leaves her unimpressed, but Finn's slow, stripped-down rendition of "Girls Just Want to Have Fun" is better received.

Puck (Mark Salling) ostensibly sings "I'm the Only One" for Santana, but delivers most of the song to an embarrassed Shelby (Idina Menzel) in front of a suspicious Quinn (Dianna Agron). Quinn later tries to seduce him, but he refuses and calls her crazy. Shelby calls Puck for assistance when her daughter Beth has a minor medical emergency; the two later have sex, but she regrets it and asks him to leave. Angered, Puck returns to Quinn, and she reveals her desire to have a second baby with him. Puck refuses, and tries to comfort her; he offers to share an important secret if she promises not to tell anyone.

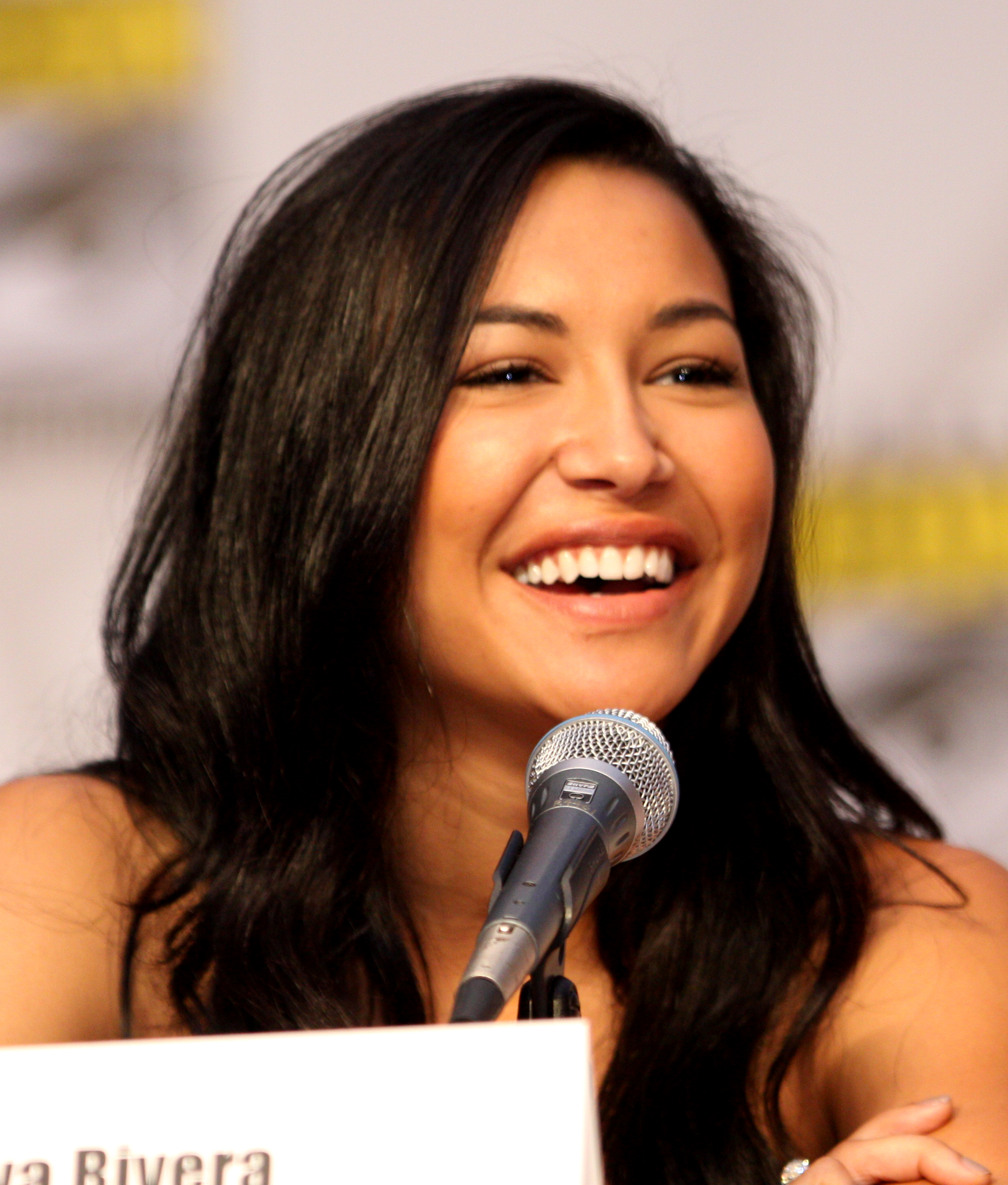
Santana (Naya Rivera, pictured) tells her grandmother that she is a lesbian in this episode

Kurt's quest to become senior class president appears doomed and along with it his college prospects; he confesses to Rachel (Lea Michele) that he is thinking about stuffing the ballot box to ensure that he wins. Sue's (Jane Lynch) congressional campaign is also in trouble: to combat allegations that she is a lesbian, Sue decides to start an arbitrary relationship with a man, and chooses former bedmate Cooter Menkins (Eric Bruskotter), who has been having difficulty connecting with Coach Beiste (Dot-Marie Jones) due to her emotional armor. A distraught Beiste sings "Jolene", confesses her love for Cooter and tells Sue she won't give him up without a fight. Sue loses the congressional election to Burt Hummel (Mike O'Malley).

An arrogant jock (David Wilson Page) tries to seduce Santana to "make her normal". The female members of both glee clubs defend her, and together they sing "I Kissed a Girl". Santana comes out to her parents, who are accepting, but when she tells her grandmother (Ivonne Coll), she tells Santana to leave and never return, saying it is a sin to speak of such things.

Kurt and his father Burt are called in to see Principal Figgins (Iqbal Theba), where it is revealed that although Kurt apparently won his election by 190 votes, more votes have been cast than there are students. Kurt admits that he contemplated cheating, but decided against doing so. Nevertheless, Kurt is disqualified and Brittany wins the election. Kurt tells Finn and Rachel that he is still under suspicion, and after he leaves, Rachel admits to Finn that she was the one who stuffed the ballot box because she wanted to help Kurt.

To end the week, Santana sings "Constant Craving" to the combined glee clubs, inter-cut with Shelby and Kurt also singing. Rachel then arrives and confesses that she was the one who committed election fraud: the incident will go on her permanent record, she is suspended for a week and she is banned from participating in the impending show choir Sectionals competition.

== Production ==
The episode was written by Matthew Hodgson and directed by Tate Donovan. Filming began on October 13, 2011, while the fifth and sixth episodes, "The First Time" and "Mash Off" respectively, were still shooting, though the fifth episode finished the following day. The final day of filming was November 1, 2011.

Series co-creator Ian Brennan revealed to TV Guide that the episode would have not one election in it, but two: both senior class president and the congressional special election would occur on the same day, and McKinley High would be a polling place for the latter. According to Brennan, "People are voting for both elections in the school, with signs pointing voters in different directions", and there will be a "very surprising twist" in the final results.

Football recruiter Cooter Menkins (Bruskotter) returns in this episode, and becomes a bone of contention between Coach Beiste and Sue. Other recurring guest stars who appear in this episode include Principal Figgins (Theba), teachers Shelby Corcoran (Menzel) and Mrs. Hagberg (Mary Gillis), Kurt's father and congressional candidate Burt Hummel (O'Malley), Coach Beiste (Jones), cheerleader Becky Jackson (Lauren Potter), school reporter Jacob Ben Israel (Josh Sussman), Troubletones member Sugar Motta (Vanessa Lengies) and New Directions member Rory Flanagan (Damian McGinty).

Music in the episode includes the song from which it gets its title, Katy Perry's "I Kissed a Girl", which was previously sung by Tina for her glee club audition in the show's pilot. Jones performs Dolly Parton's "Jolene" during the episode, her second time singing on the show; her first was a duet with Matthew Morrison in the second-season episode "Blame It on the Alcohol". All six songs from the episode have been released as singles including "I Kissed a Girl" and "Jolene"; the other four are k.d. lang's "Constant Craving" sung by Rivera, Menzel and Colfer, Cyndi Lauper's "Girls Just Want to Have Fun" in the Greg Laswell version sung by Monteith, Melissa Etheridge's "I'm the Only One" sung by Salling and a clean version of Pink's "Fuckin' Perfect" entitled "Perfect", sung by Colfer and Criss.

On August 6, 2012, co-creator Ryan Murphy uploaded a deleted scene in which Santana comes out to Sue and her fellow Cheerios to YouTube.

== Reception ==
=== Ratings ===
"I Kissed a Girl" was first broadcast on November 29, 2011, in the United States on Fox. It received a 3.2/8 Nielsen rating/share in the 18–49 demographic, and attracted 7.90 million American viewers during its initial airing, up from the 7.08 million viewers and 3.0/8 rating/share for the previous episode, "Mash Off", which was broadcast on November 15, 2011.

Viewership was also up significantly in the United Kingdom and Canada. In the United Kingdom, "I Kissed a Girl" was watched on Sky1 by 1.09 million viewers, an increase of over 21% compared to "Mash Off" two weeks before, when 900,000 viewers were watching. In Canada, 1.79 million viewers watched the episode, which made it the eighth most-viewed show of the week, up ten slots and 9% from the 1.64 million viewers who watched "Mash Off" two weeks prior.

In Australia, "I Kissed a Girl" was broadcast on January 27, 2012. It was the first new episode since "Mash Off" had aired on November 16, 2012, and was in a new Friday evening time slot as opposed to the previously scheduled Wednesday broadcasts. It was watched by 575,000 viewers, down over 15% from the previous new episode, which was watched by 683,000 viewers. David Dale of the Sydney Morning Herald was scathing in his opinion of the show's rescheduling: "Channel Ten must be insane to waste a new season of Glee on a night when the target audience are all out trying to get alcohol with fake IDs. Look at the pathetic numbers in the Friday chart."

=== Critical reception ===
The episode as a whole received mixed to negative reviews from critics. Rae Votta of Billboard wrote that it "stumbles as much as it shines, with two plot lines-worth of structure that make sense, and two that fall completely flat". Rolling Stone's Erica Futterman stated that "while there were undeniably significant plot moments, the emotional depth was lacking", and Robert Canning of IGN said it was "kind of boring" and nothing happened to "make it better than bland". AOLTV's Crystal Bell found it frustrating, and said that the "worst part" was that it "made me stop caring about these characters". Emily VanDerWerff of The A.V. Club wrote that "a ton of it just didn't work". The Houston Chronicle's Bobby Hankinson looked on the episode more favorably, however, and maintained that while it did not achieve the level of the previous two, it was a "pretty strong outing nonetheless".

Lesley Goldberg of The Hollywood Reporter said that the scene where Santana comes out to her grandmother only to be rejected was a "powerful moment and Rivera delivered in a way equal to Chris Colfer and Mike O'Malley's scenes during Kurt's coming out". Bell also complimented the sequence, though she criticized the next scene for showing "a happy, smiling Santana" with no further explanation, and Canning and Kubicek were also unhappy with her abrupt change in mood, as if nothing had happened. VanDerWerff, though she called the coming-out scene "a moment that's played with a sort of bracing honesty and moving empathy" for what Santana was going through, stated that the "Santana storyline has been one of the best things about the back half of season two and this front half of season three, and the scenes that should be its emotional crux are occurring in our imaginations", such as when she comes out to her parents. Goldberg called the fact that Finn suffered no consequences for his outing of Santana "a missed opportunity". Bell, however, thought that his telling Santana that "he cares about her and doesn't want her to hold her feelings for women in anymore" was "one of the most touching scenes of the series", though Kubicek characterized Finn's statement that he cared for her because Santana "was his first" as creepy. MTV's Kevin P. Sullivan derided the choice to perform "I Kissed a Girl" as "poor comprehension of song lyrics", since Santana "is a lesbian and not just [a] drunk girl who kissed another girl after drinking". VanDerWerff wondered why Santana was so happy during the song, since she had just experienced "the sort of outrageous bigotry she'll have to put up with for the rest of her life".

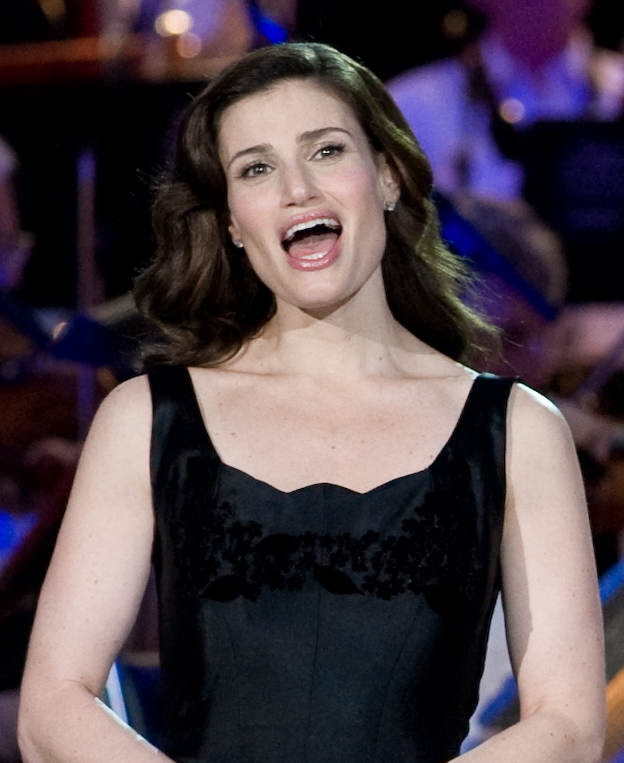
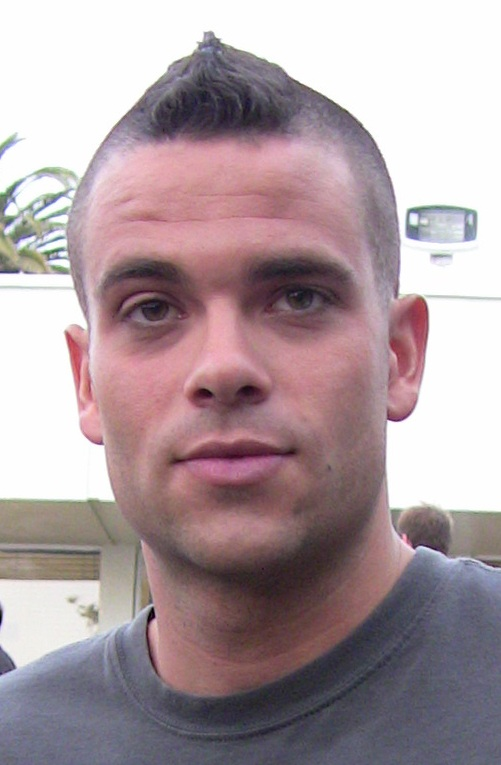
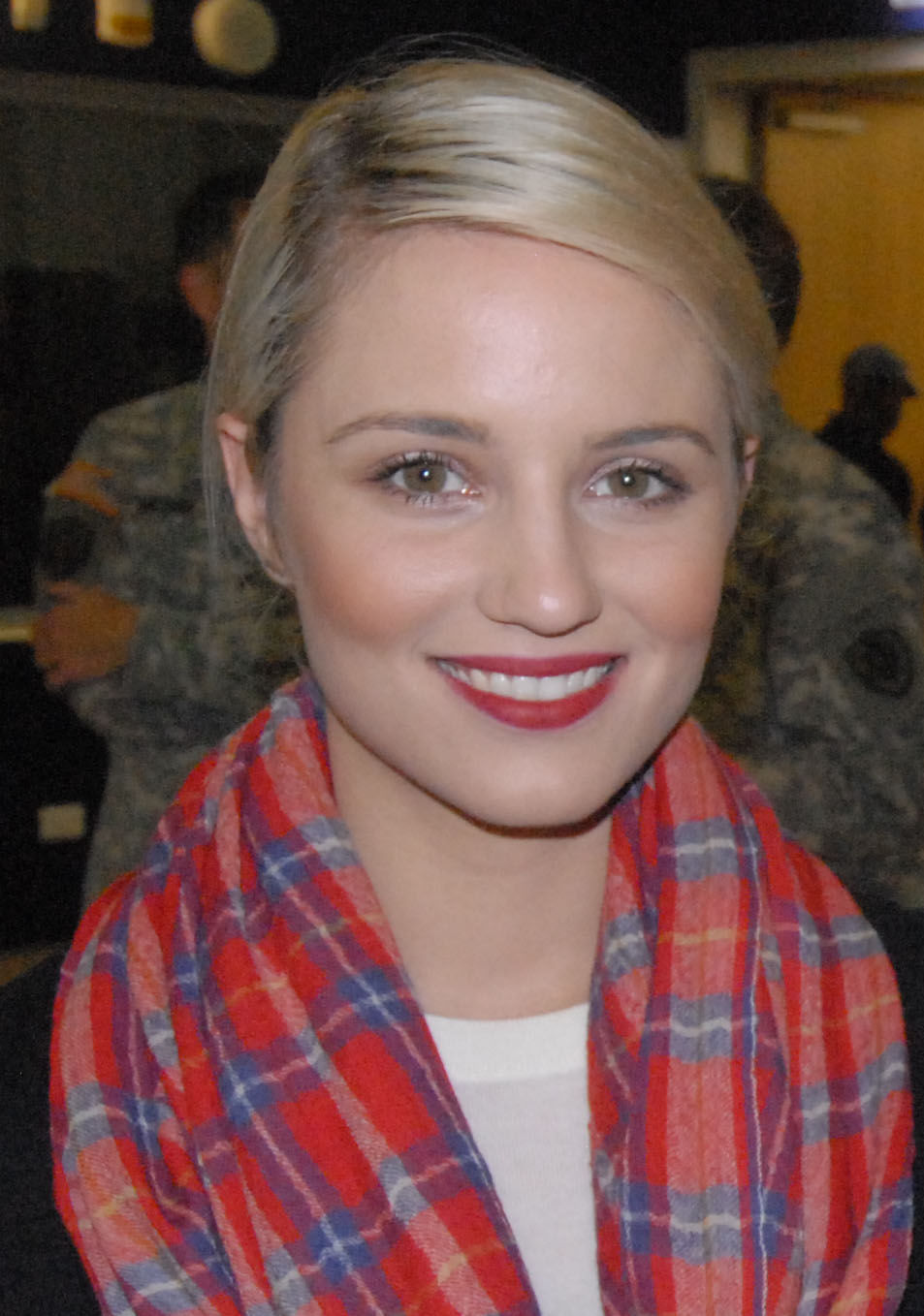
The storylines centered on the growing intimacy between teacher Shelby (Menzel, left) and student Puck (Salling, center) and on the irrational behavior exhibited by Quinn (Agron, right) were strongly criticized by reviewers.

Quinn's increasingly odd behavior was commented on by several reviewers. Chaney wrote that she was acting "in an irrational manner that has no connection with reality", and Bell wondered if co-creator Murphy was "trying to make her the most hated character on 'Glee' ever". Amy Reiter of the Los Angeles Times, though she noted that "Quinn's character just gets weirder and weirder", wrote that Puck gets it right: "Quinn's the craziest, most self-involved character on the show", but "has a resilience that may take her far in life" and needs a "healthy dose of self-esteem". VanDerWerff was initially pleased that the show "acknowledged that all of her actions are driven by a deep, sucking need to be loved" and that "Puck gently told her that she was better than that, that she could put herself together again", but not that it then "just turned into more pointless Puck/Shelby/Quinn drama. Ugh." Critics such as Kubicek were even more scathing about Shelby and the storyline with Puck that led to the pair having sex during the episode: "The dumbest storyline Glee has ever done gets even dumber." Sullivan called it "the most divisive plot line of the season", and Bell asked, "Instead of these super creepy scenes between Puck and Shelby, can we please get more screen time for Shelby and Rachel?"

Votta criticized the show for the "pointless adult love triangle" involving Coach Beiste, Sue, and Cooter Menkins. VanDerWerff described Jones as "one of the show's greatest gifts", and lamented that they had her "fighting with Sue Dynasty-style over a recruiter for Ohio State". Bell called the scene where Beiste "confesses her love for Cooter" a "simply sweet scene that's only ruined by Sue's grumpy presence", and Sue's decision to go after Cooter a "crazy plot". Votta looked at Sue's pursuit of Cooter through a different lens: "in an episode that should be about kids who are looking for approval and the various ways they do and don't achieve that", the show gives a "completely opposite message from Sue's quest to prove her straightness", which "muddles" the show's messages. Chaney thought that Sue "was back in fine, vindictive catchphrase-spewing form", and noted that "all the election subplots were tied up remarkably quickly". This last point did not sit well with Berk, who wrote that the show resolved "what was one of the more interesting subplots in one of the least interesting ways", and Canning was disappointed that the episode did not have "more with Burt". As for Burt's son, Kurt, Votta wanted to "leap through the television and explain to him that student council elections mean absolutely nothing" to his future college prospects, and Kubicek declared himself "sick" of that plot thread, which he called "just plain moronic".

=== Music and performances ===
The musical performances received mixed to positive reviews. Hankinson wrote that it was a "strong night". Chaney thought it was "decent but not as strong" as the previous episode, "Mash Off"; Futterman had a similar take and called it a "hodge-podge of songs that fit the bill but don't necessarily stand out", and "musically meh". Bell wrote that "the music was awful", and she was upset because she "really like[s] chick rock", the musical focus of the episode.

Chaney was not very excited by Kurt and Blaine's rendition of "Perfect", while Raymund Flandez of The Wall Street Journal called it an "almost cloying duet". Entertainment Weekly's Abby West thought it was "sweetly" sung and "perfectly lovely", and Michael Slezak of TVLine said it "really picked up steam" as it progressed. Votta said that "what we got" was "wonderfully done, and a perfect balance of Darren Criss and Chris Colfer's musical strengths", but she was perplexed that they "cut the verses most relevant to Santana" yet "kept the cheeky rap bridge". In contrast, she thought Puck's performance of "I'm the Only One" was "the most awkward thing Glee has done in a while, and drags on forever", though she added that Salling sounded "great". Slezak expressed the wish that Puck would get to do "a mashup or an interesting arrangement", and gave the song a "C+", while Futterman said the song was "a strain on his voice" and the presentation "another cookie-cutter classroom setting". BuddyTV's John Kubicek called it the "kind of song Puck should always do."

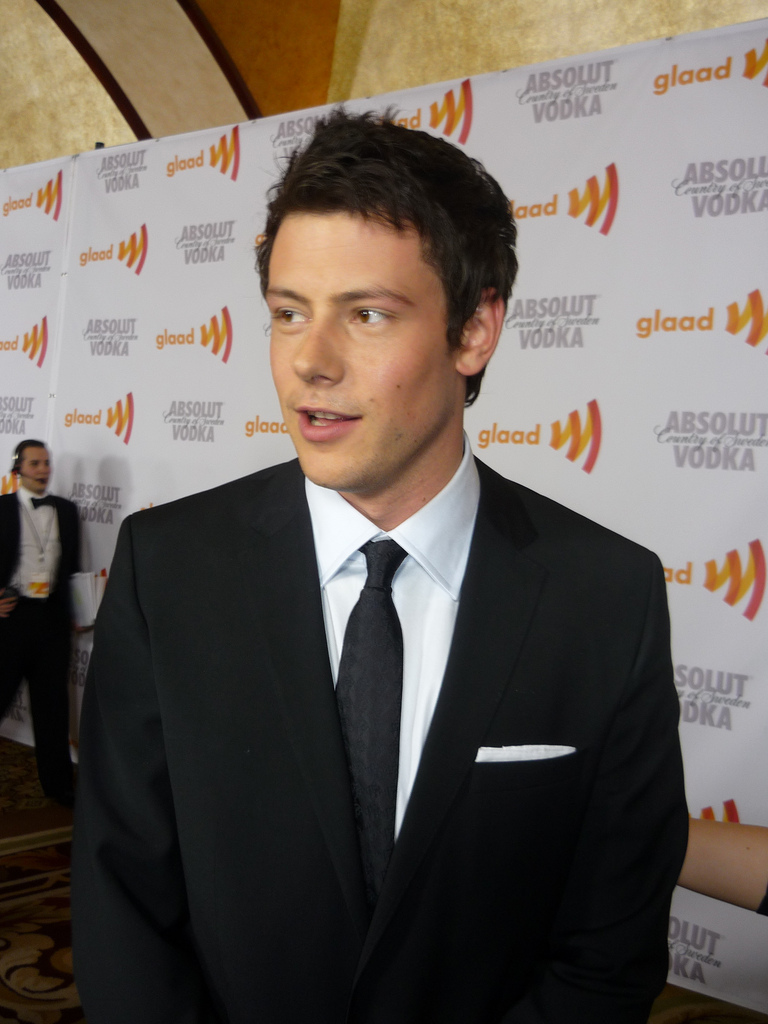
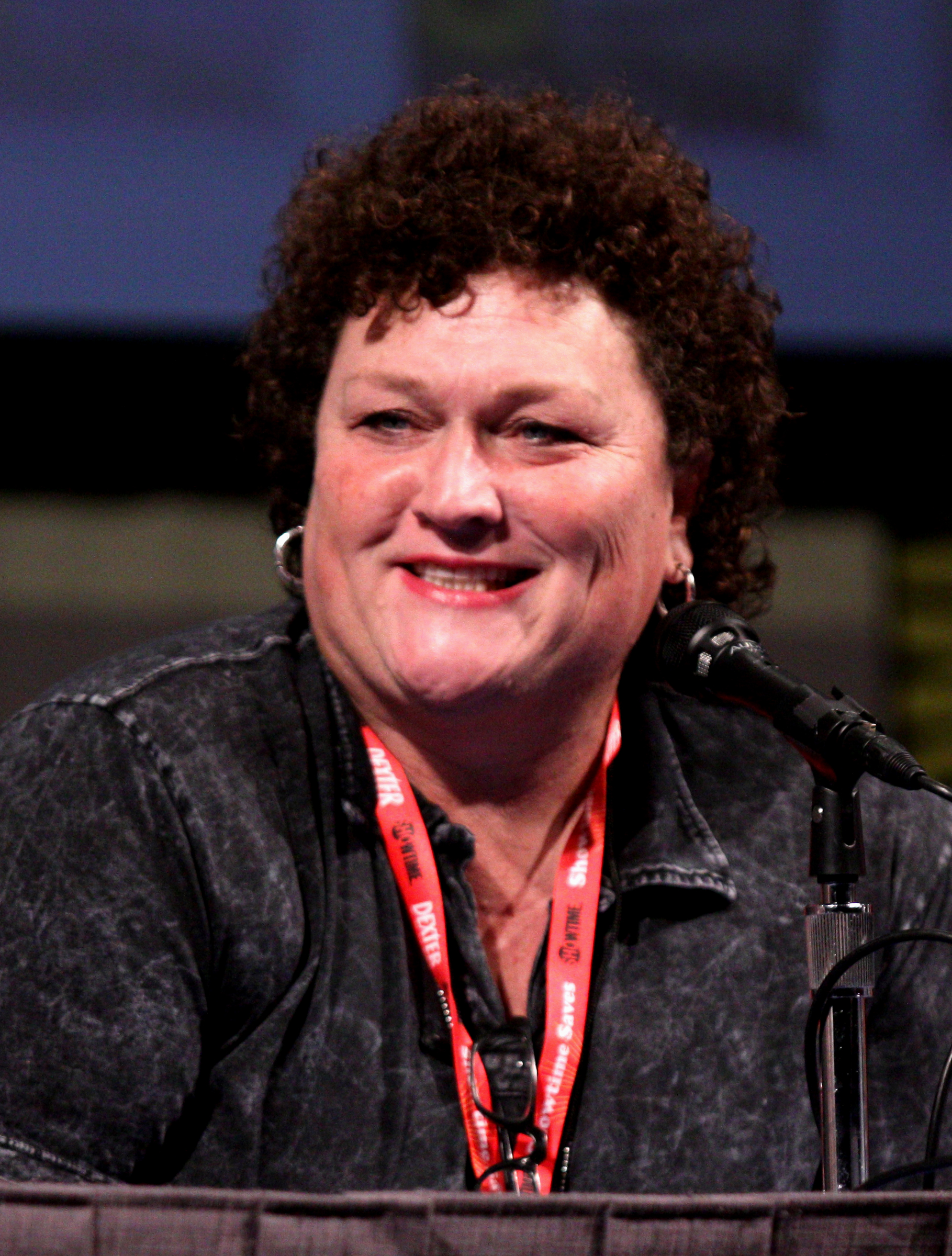
Reviewers praised Finn's (Monteith, left) performance of "Girls Just Want to Have Fun", and highlighted Coach Beiste's (Jones, right) first solo number on the show, "Jolene"

Finn's performance of "Girls Just Want to Have Fun" received the most commentary. Bell wrote that "his cover of Greg Laswell's cover" of the Lauper song "may just be my favorite Finn solo ever". Kubicek described the "slowed-down, acoustic version" as "insanely good", and Flandez called it "poignant" and "surprising and appealing". West said it was "the best showcase for his voice in recent memory". Slezak called it his "favorite performance by Finn in the last two seasons", and added that Monteith "sounded terrific". While Votta thought the rendition was "sweet" and "well sung", she wrote that it "felt a little off-center"; Chaney described it as "not terribly compelling". Sullivan called it a "horrifyingly creepy" performance.

Coach Beiste's first solo number, "Jolene", was called "haunting" by Vanity Fair's Brett Berk, who gave it four stars out of five, and Slezak said it was a "killer use of Dolly Parton" even if "Beiste isn't the strongest vocalist". Both Futterman and Kubicek noted a lack of emotion in Beiste's voice, but they also noted the emotion in her face, which Kubicek said "more than made up for it". Chaney wrote that "the execution felt emotionally flat" and gave it a "C", but West graded it a "B+" and said, "Coach Beiste's pain..... was clear in Dot Marie Jones' sad-hearted rendition".

Chaney called "I Kissed a Girl" the "liveliest, most enjoyable number of the night". Kubicek said that "the ladies rocked out", but his "favorite parts" were "Rory's reaction shots", which West also mentioned favorably. Futterman declared it as "an OK rendition". For "Constant Craving", she noted some "nice harmonies", but "in what seems to be a trend this episode, the song falls flat as a whole". Kubicek stated that without Santana's "pent-up emotions", there was "no subtext, just text". Chaney wrote that the performance was "not stunning, but certainly strong". Votta said that Santana "kills" on the song, Hankinson stated that "Shelby and Santana were awesome" and Slezak called it "gorgeous and totally relevant".

=== Chart history ===
Five of the six cover versions released as singles debuted on the Billboard Hot 100: "Perfect" debuted at number fifty-seven, "Girls Just Want to Have Fun" at number fifty-nine, "I Kissed a Girl" at number sixty-six, "I'm the Only One" at number eighty-six and "Constant Craving" at number eighty-nine. The first three of those singles also debuted on the Billboard Canadian Hot 100: "Perfect" at number seventy-one, "Girls Just Want to Have Fun" at number seventy-five and "I Kissed a Girl" at number eighty-seven. "Jolene" did not chart in either country.

Both "Girls Just Want to Have Fun" and "Constant Craving" were featured on the soundtrack album Glee: The Music, Volume 7. Three additional songs from the episode were included in the five bonus tracks available on the Target edition of the album: "Perfect", "I'm the Only One" and "I Kissed a Girl".
