= Mash Off =

- Glee episode
- Episode no.: Season 3 Episode 6
- Directed by: Eric Stoltz
- Written by: Michael Hitchcock
- Production code: 3ARC06
- Original air date: November 15, 2011

Guest appearances
- Idina Menzel as Shelby Corcoran; Mike O'Malley as Burt Hummel; Iqbal Theba as Principal Figgins; Dot-Marie Jones as Shannon Beiste; Damian McGinty as Rory Flanagan; Vanessa Lengies as Sugar Motta; Lauren Potter as Becky Jackson; Eric Etebari as Reggie Salazar

Episode chronology
← Previous "The First Time"	Next → "I Kissed a Girl"
- Glee season 3

"Mash Off" is the sixth episode of the third season of the American musical television series Glee, and the fiftieth overall. The episode was written by Michael Hitchcock and directed by Eric Stoltz, and originally aired on Fox in the United States on November 15, 2011. Special guest star Idina Menzel is featured as rival glee club director Shelby Corcoran, and she and Will Schuester (Matthew Morrison) hold a mash-up competition between the Troubletones and the New Directions. Santana (Naya Rivera) mercilessly taunts rival glee club member Finn (Cory Monteith), who ultimately responds by publicly accusing her of cowardice in her relationship with Brittany, thereby revealing to their fellow students that she is a lesbian. Sue Sylvester (Jane Lynch) starts a propaganda campaign against Burt Hummel (Mike O'Malley), her chief rival in the special election for congress.

Principal photography for "Mash Off" occurred in October 2011. The episode features four mash-ups, including the show's 300th musical number, Adele's "Someone Like You" and "Rumour Has It", which sold 160,000 copies in its first week and debuted at number eleven on the Billboard Hot 100. All songs from the episode were released as singles available for digital download.

"Mash Off" was met with a mostly positive reception from critics, and its musical performances and cover versions were also well received by reviewers. Upon its initial airing, this episode was viewed by 7.08 million American viewers and earned a 3.0/8 Nielsen rating/share in the 18–49 demographic. The total viewership was up from the previous episode, "The First Time".

== Plot ==
Puck (Mark Salling) fantasizes about his substitute teacher, Shelby Corcoran (Idina Menzel), whom he recently kissed and has since fallen in love with. He sings "Hot for Teacher" by Van Halen, with Mike (Harry Shum, Jr.), Blaine (Darren Criss) and Finn (Cory Monteith). Puck tries to convince Shelby, who adopted the child he fathered with Quinn (Dianna Agron), to start a relationship with him, but she rejects the idea. Quinn still wants to get Beth, her birth daughter, back from Shelby, and tries to join Shelby's glee club, the Troubletones, to get closer to Shelby. After Puck tells Shelby of Quinn's true intentions, Shelby informs Quinn that she does not want her in Beth's life.

Will (Matthew Morrison) and Shelby agree to hold a mash-up competition between the New Directions and the Troubletones. Santana (Naya Rivera) takes the rivalry very seriously, and taunts and derides her former New Directions teammates—particularly Finn. He challenges Santana and the other Troubletones to a game of dodgeball. Finn and Santana are the last two people standing, until Santana whips a ball at Finn's face, and wins the game. Despite having won, Santana violently targets Rory (Damian McGinty), and makes his nose bleed.

Cheerleading coach Sue (Jane Lynch) starts a campaign against Burt Hummel (Mike O'Malley), her main rival in the election for congress. When Burt's son Kurt (Chris Colfer) accuses her of lying, Sue defends her tactics, and tells Kurt that his own campaign for senior class president is boring and lacks edge. When the presidential candidates make their assembly speeches, Kurt pledges to ban dodgeball, a sport he says is too often used to bully. Rachel (Lea Michele) withdraws her candidacy and urges everyone to vote for Kurt. Rachel later confesses to Kurt that she quit so that he could have something important to put on his college application, and because she missed being his friend. The two make up, and go to work on Kurt's campaign.

Mercedes (Amber Riley) is elected president of the Troubletones, and tells Santana that she should play fair against New Directions from now on. Santana makes a rare apology to Finn in the school hallway, but her so-called apology consists of a series of insults. As she walks away, Finn retaliates by telling her to come out of the closet, and calls her a coward for constantly tearing others down while not accepting herself and her relationship with Brittany. A couple of days later, Santana is told by Sue and Burt that the niece of one of their opponents in the election overheard the conversation between her and Finn, and said opponent is about to release an attack ad that criticizes Sue for choosing a lesbian as head cheerleader. Santana runs out of the office in tears, saying that her parents do not yet know she is gay. The episode concludes with the Troubletones' mash-up of Adele songs. The moment the performance ends, Santana jumps down from the stage after seeing Finn whispering something to Rachel, blames Finn for outing her to the world and slaps him in the face.

== Production ==
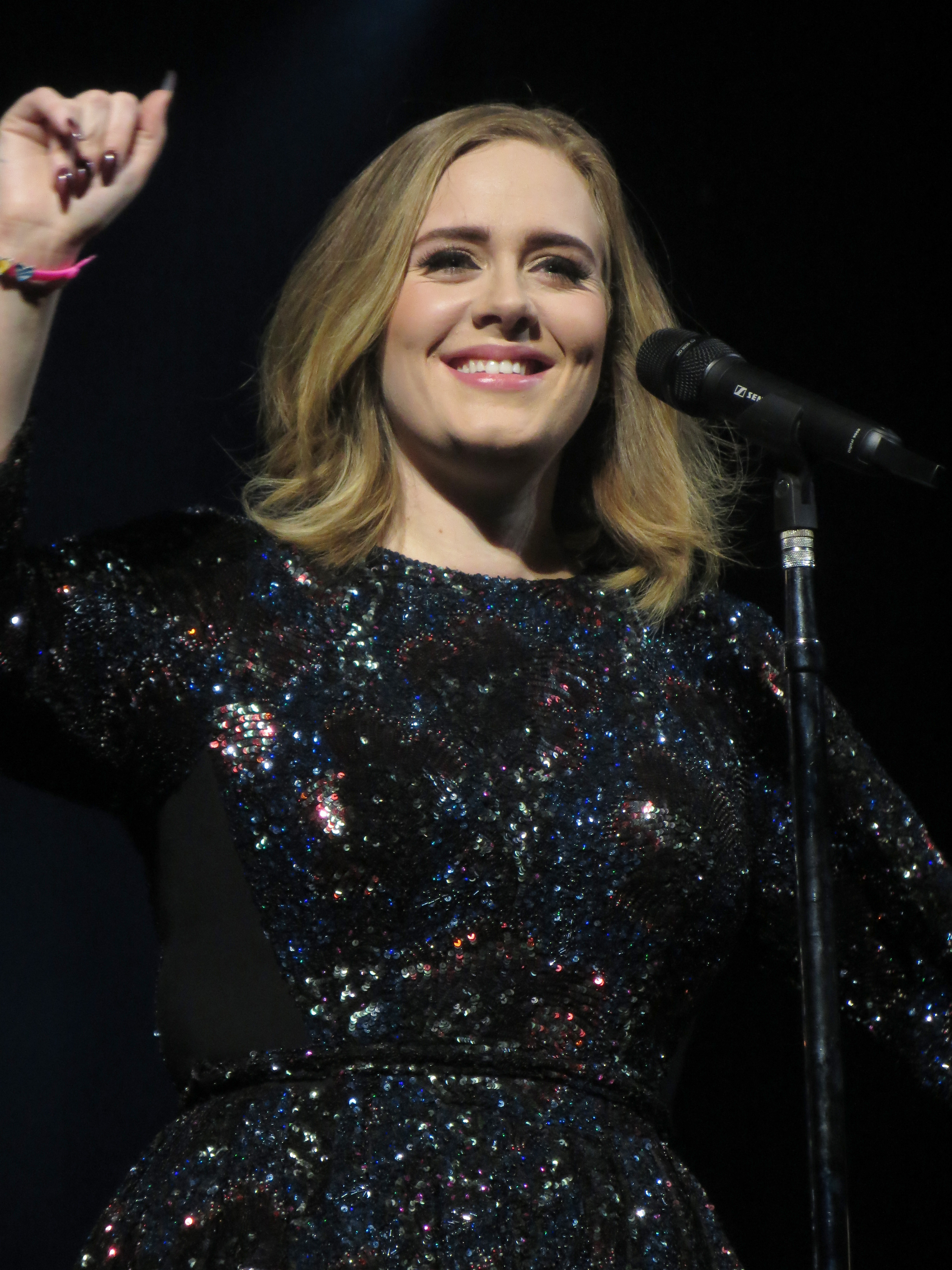
The episode featured a mash-up of Adele's "Someone Like You" and "Rumour Has It"

"Mash Off" was written by Michael Hitchcock and directed by Eric Stoltz. Principal photography for the episode commenced on October 6, 2011, while the fifth episode, "The First Time" was still shooting; It was initially filmed in parallel with that episode, which continued through October 14, 2011, and also with the seventh episode, which began filming on October 13, 2011. This episode marked the 300th musical number Glee has filmed, which was a mash-up of two Adele songs: "Rumour Has It" and "Someone Like You", with lead vocals by Amber Riley and Naya Rivera. The performance was filmed with great fanfare "in front of an audience of press and crew members" on October 26, 2011, and included a press briefing afterward. Riley revealed during the briefing that she suggested the idea that she perform Adele to co-creators Brad Falchuk and Ryan Murphy after finding out that Adele was hoping Riley would sing her music on the show: "Someone actually e-mailed me a video of Adele saying that she wanted me to sing her song, so I e-mailed it to Brad and Ryan."

The episode was to contain a flashback to a sixteen-year-old Sue, played by Colby Minifie, singing the title song of the musical Oklahoma! in a scene that would have explained Sue's antipathy to music in the schools. Series co-creator Ian Brennan said "we wanted to show that Sue at one point had Broadway dreams", and Lynch reveals, "Will tells Sue, 'Poor little Susie Sylvester was told she wasn't good, and now she's got to punish the world.' Like a lot of angry people out there, Sue's a wannabe." However, the scene was not broadcast because it was, according to Murphy, "too long for the episode"; he also stated that the footage, with the title "How Sue Sylvester Became a Bitch", would be released in the future, "either as a DVD extra or online".

Three other mash-ups beyond the Adele one are performed in the episode: a Hall & Oates mash-up of "I Can't Go for That" and "You Make My Dreams" performed by New Directions, a mash-up of Lady Gaga's "You and I" and Eddie Rabbitt and Crystal Gayle's "You and I", performed by Morrison and Menzel, and one of Pat Benatar's "Hit Me with Your Best Shot" and Blondie's "One Way or Another", performed by competing glee clubs New Directions and the Troubletones. Van Halen's "Hot for Teacher", performed by Mark Salling, is also included. Recurring guest stars appearing in the episode include teacher Shelby Corcoran (Menzel), Kurt's father and new congressional candidate Burt Hummel (O'Malley), Principal Figgins (Iqbal Theba), football coach Shannon Beiste (Dot-Marie Jones), cheerleader Becky Jackson (Lauren Potter), rival glee club member Sugar Motta (Vanessa Lengies), and exchange student Rory Flanagan (McGinty).

== Reception ==
=== Ratings ===
"Mash Off" was first broadcast on November 15, 2011, in the United States on Fox. It received a 3.0/8 Nielsen rating/share in the 18–49 demographic, and attracted 7.08 million American viewers during its initial airing, which tied with "Pot o' Gold" for the lowest rating of the third season. While the show's viewership was up slightly from the 6.91 million viewers for the previous episode, "The First Time", which was broadcast on November 8, 2011, the rating in the 18–49 demographic decreased slightly from the 3.1/8 rating/share received by that episode.

Viewership was also up slightly in Australia, but decreased in Canada and hit a season low in the United Kingdom, where "Mash Off" was watched on Sky1 by 900,000 viewers, down over 7% compared to "The First Time" the previous week, when 973,000 viewers were watching. In Australia, "Mash Off" was watched by 683,000 viewers, which made Glee the fourteenth most-watched program of the night for the second week in a row. The viewership was up slightly from the previous episode, which was seen by 660,000 viewers. In Canada, viewership was down slightly and 1.64 million viewers watched the episode, which made it the eighteenth most-viewed show of the week, down three slots but only 20,000 viewers from the 1.66 million viewers who watched "The First Time" the week before.

=== Critical response ===
Television critics were more favorable than not in their response to "Mash Off". Erica Futterman of Rolling Stone felt that the series returned to form in the episode, and commented: "We've said it before and we'll say it again: we like our Glee with just enough ridiculousness, and this week had it." Entertainment Weekly journalist Abby West noted that she loved the fact that it "was a bullying episode that snuck up on us". Raymund Flandez of The Wall Street Journal opined that "Mash Off" was one of the best installments of Glee, and cited the episode's storylines as highlights: "The mash-up episodes every season can be hit or miss, but this year was perfected to the nth degree." Amy Reiter of the Los Angeles Times wrote that there was plenty of "airy fun to be found" in "Mash Off", but added that "underneath all the silly fake mustaches and snappy quotes about root-beer fountains and robot teachers beat a very dark baboon heart. In the end, that murky, telltale undercurrent burst to the fore, like a ... slap in the face, leaving us gasping and a little confused." Houston Chronicle's Bobby Hankinson stated that it was "surprisingly good", and that "Mash Off" was a "solid hour of television that was bursting with fantastic musical numbers and some really gratifying narrative developments". Michael Slezak of TVLine said that the episode contributed to a revitalization of the quality of the show's third season.

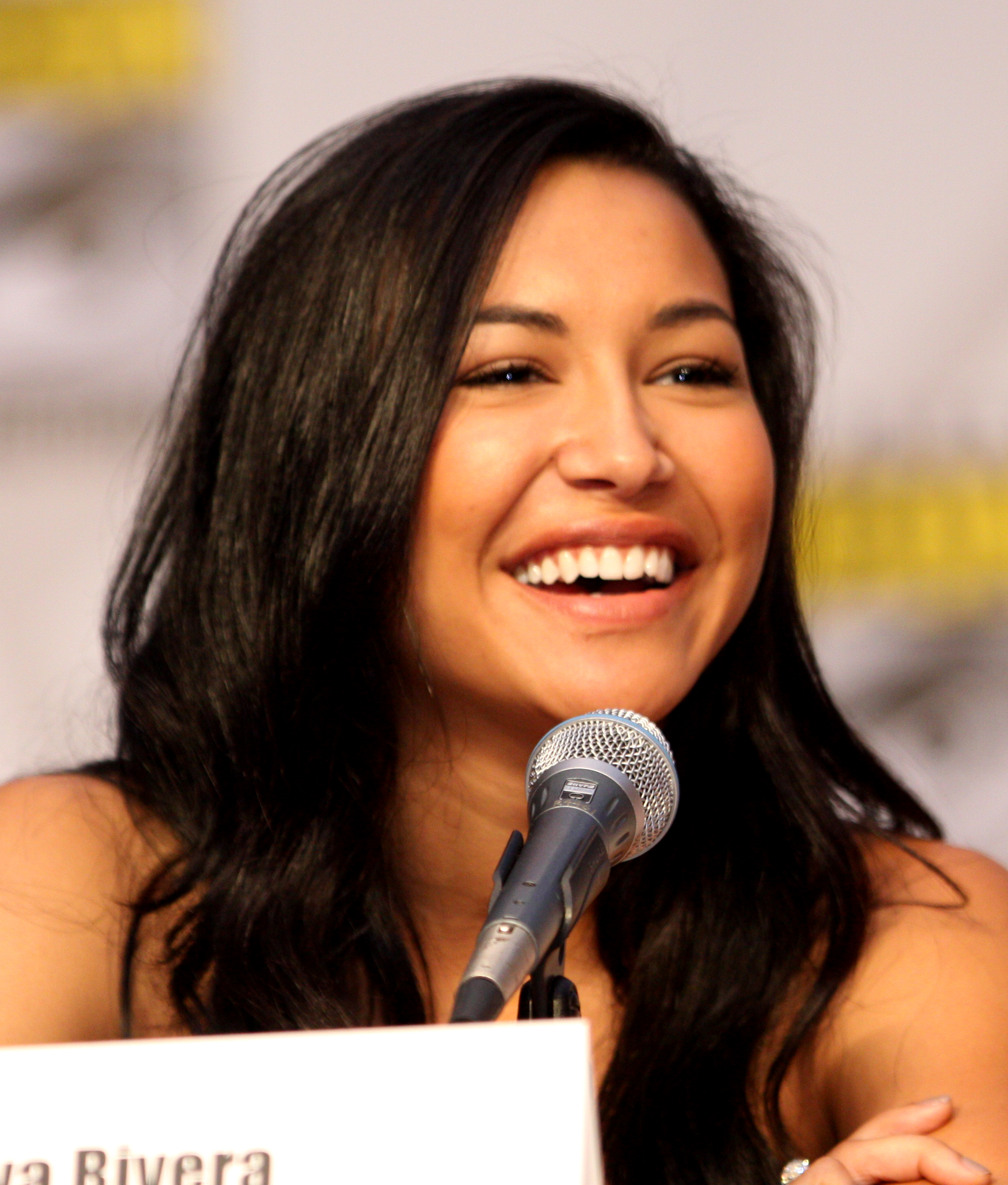
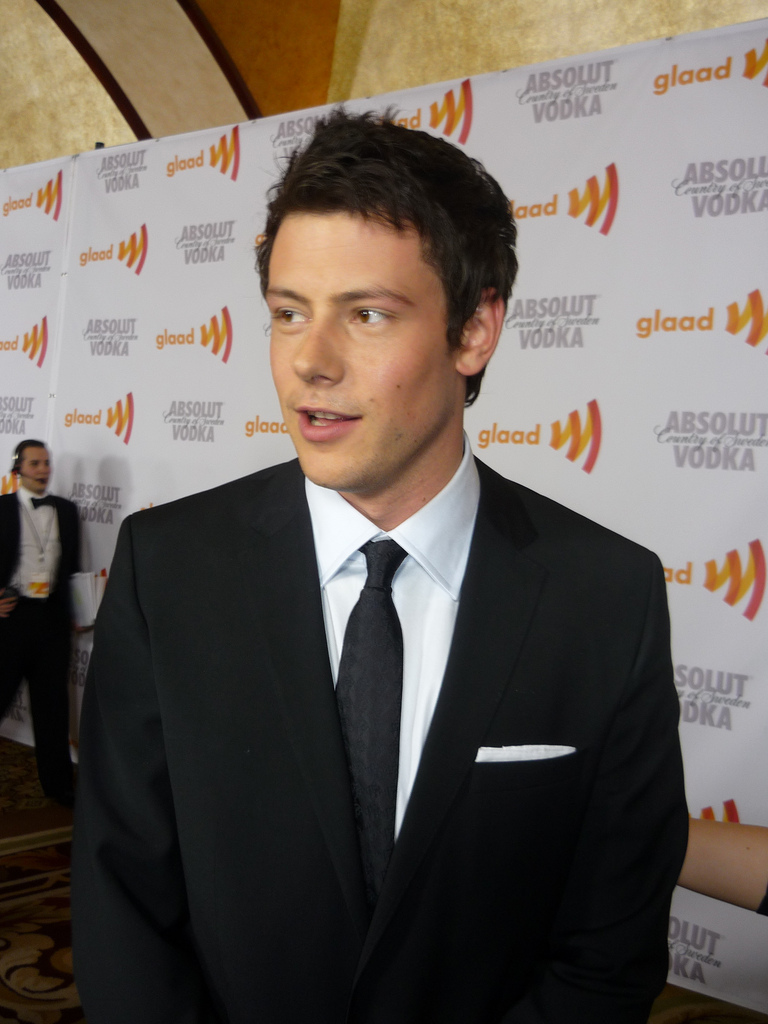
Television critics commended the interactions between Santana (Rivera, left) and Finn (Monteith, right)

Catriona Wightman of Digital Spy wrote, "This was a confusing episode of Glee. For a while, it seemed pretty unremarkable—a standard installment, meandering along enjoyably enough. But then, in the last few minutes, it suddenly got really rather dark indeed. I'm intrigued about what happens next." Emily St. James of The A.V. Club gave "Mash Off" a "C" grade, and felt that the episode did not reach its full potential. She wrote, "The gut-punch moment is sufficiently gut-punchy, and we'll get to that in a bit. But everything building up to it is so messy that the solidly dramatic moment almost made me angry. There's something about this show that leads to messy tonal mash-ups. But where the show's musical mash-ups are usually pretty harmonious, the tonal shifts can often be brutally unsubtle." James Poniewozik of Time felt that it was notably inferior to the previous episode, with many more "forgettable scenes and stories".

The character development of Santana and her interactions with Finn were well received by critics. Poniewozik stated that Santana confronting her sexuality was one of the highlights of "Mash Off". Wightman commented that despite Santana's callous personality, "watching her burst into tears and sob that she hasn't even told her parents about her sexuality yet [was] heartbreaking". Robert Canning of IGN wrote, "The biggest development was the unexpected way Santana's sexuality became public. It was a nice way to end things, building tension towards hopefully more resonating episodes to come." St. James said that "the last five minutes of this episode are phenomenal, one of those times that the show gets the mix of tones just right and something that's vaguely comedic gets more and more horrifying and dramatic, and then we plunge down the rabbit hole and everything goes nuts." To Ryan Gajewski of Wetpaint, the scene that concluded "Mash Off" was a "fascinating twist, and one that makes it hard to choose sides". He added, "Santana has certainly been not-exactly-cuddly these past few weeks, but it's still clear that Finn totally crossed the line."

=== Music and performances ===
The opening number for the episode, "Hot for Teacher", was commended by most critics. Futterman described it as a "high-energy performance with the right amount of absurdity". Brett Berk of Vanity Fair gave the musical number a four out of five stars, and cited the choreography as the highlight of the performance. West gave it a grade of "A−", and wrote, "This was such big fun and the backup guys ... really helped amp it up." Slezak was less enthusiastic about the sequence. He was critical of Salling's vocals and felt that a heavy metal song was not suited to his stylings; he ultimately gave it a "C+" grade. He also criticized the choreography, and stated that he had to "downgrade a little for Blaine and Mike Chang's grotesque 'whoopsie, I'm hiding an erection!' dance move that will probably haunt me to my grave."

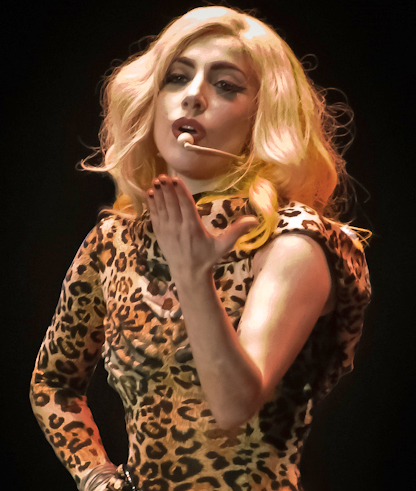
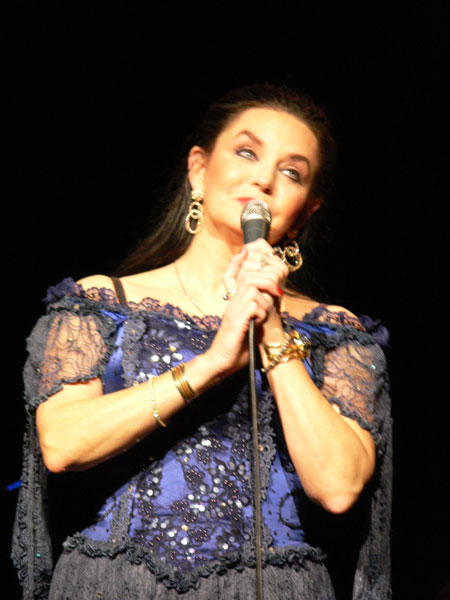
The mash-up of "You and I" by Lady Gaga (left) and another "You and I" by Crystal Gayle (right) and Eddie Rabbitt was well-received by critics.

Berk said that the mash-up of the two "You and I" songs "almost worked", while Los Angeles Times writer L'Oreal Thompson praised the vocals of Menzel: "It's official. Shelby sings Gaga as good as, if not better than, Gaga sings Gaga." Slezak awarded the performance a "B" grade, and opined: "I loved the audacity of mashing up Lady Gaga with an Eddie Rabbit–Crystal Gayle chestnut, and the results had the sheen of '70s a.m. radio fare. Shelby's voice was almost too crystal clear for the Gaga half of the composition." Futterman said that Menzel "can kill a Gaga ballad", and while she "outshines" Morrison, he "complements her nicely". West gave the mash-up a "B+", called it "really well-done" and said it was "elevated" by Menzel's voice. MTV's Kevin P. Sullivan wanted Menzel to interpret more songs by Lady Gaga. In contrast, Rae Votta of Billboard denounced the sequence, and called it "horrendous".

West gave the mash-up of "Hit Me With Your Best Shot" / "One Way or Another" a "B" grade, while Slezak gave the performance a "B+". Slezak wrote, "Santana's moments on lead were obviously stronger than Finn's Auto-Tuned into submission vocals, but that doesn't mean the number wasn't a hoot." Futterman called it a "fierce match", and added the mash-up was well crafted. Hankinson rated it the second best performance of the episode. Brian Moyler of Gawker, who writes of his dislike of mash-ups, characterized it as "the only mash-up of the night that actually makes sense" but he called it an "awful aural clash" and "the second least dreadful".

Moyler felt that the combination of "I Can't Go for That" and "You Make My Dreams" was "an abomination" and "New Directions at their worst". He summarized: "The outfits are hokey, the dance is silly, and the music has absolutely no emotion in it." Slezak, however, issued the performance an "A−" grade, and wrote, "The Troubletones beat New Directions in this particular battle, but I loved the frothy, silly spirit of this number, with the guys dressed like Miami Vice extras, Puck and Blaine rocking Oatestaches, and Tina getting a little moment on lead vocals." Votta characterized the performance as a "fun, retro number", and Jen Chaney of The Washington Post was similarly pleased, and gave it a "B+".

"Topping the night off with Adele was a stroke of genius. All that pain, all that emotion, vibrating through the voices of the all-girl Trouble Tones was sublimely executed. Santana, whom you feel a bit sorry for because she’s been outed to the whole school and possibly all of Ohio, gives an electrifying cover of Adele's hits 'Rumour Has It' and 'Someone Like You'. She is a star in the making. Her voice was golden. She was ably aided by Mercedes, and the back-up singers."

— Raymund Flandez of The Wall Street Journal

The episode's concluding musical number, "Rumour Has It" / "Someone Like You", was acclaimed as its main highlight. Raymund Flandez described Rivera's vocals as "electrifying" and "golden". Futterman wrote that the performance was one of Glee's best sequences: "Mercedes and Santana nail their vocals and the song combines great tracks from one of the year's biggest albums while capturing both the sass and sadness of the Troubletones at this particular moment." Votta called it the best performance since the cast's rendition of "Don't Stop Believin'" in the season one finale, "Journey to Regionals", and stated, "Naya Rivera's powerful vocals and the strong arrangement still packs the emotional punch Glee was targeting." Chaney awarded the sequence an "A+" grade: "Given the emotional stakes raised by Santana's outing, which happened in the scene right before this performance, and the fact that it marked the series's 300th musical performance, this marriage" of the two Adele songs, "Rumour Has It" and "Someone Like You", was "all the more powerful". Moyler asserted that the number was "perfection" and said, "This is why I watch Glee. It is just brilliant from Mercedes first belting to the snaps on the beat to the choreography with the girls walking in a circle and making little whispers to Santana bringing tears to my eyes singing 'Someone Like You' as if it was the last song she'll ever sing in her damn life." CinemaBlend's Melissa Duko stated that the show "hit it out of the park" and added that it was her favorite performance of the season. Slezak gave the number an "A+" and wrote, "Nobody can completely match Adele doing Adele, and yet Naya Rivera and Amber Riley somehow made the sum of this mashup a worthy equal to Adele's glorious original parts." In December 2012, TV Guide named the mash-up one of Glee's best performances.

=== Chart history ===
While five singles were released from the episode, it was the four mash-ups that debuted on the Billboard Hot 100. "Rumour Has It" / "Someone Like You" debuted at number eleven in the issue dated November 23, 2011. It sold 160,000 digital downloads in its first week, the fifth-highest first week digital sales for the series. The mash-up sparked a revival in sales for "Rumour Has It", which achieved a new peak at number sixty that same week, during which it sold 42,000 digital copies. In Canada, the mash-up entered on the Canadian Hot 100 at number twelve on the strength of sales of 14,000 downloads.

The remaining three mash-ups that charted in the Billboard Hot 100 were "You and I" / "You and I" at number sixty-nine, "I Can't Go for That" / "You Make My Dreams" at number eighty, and "Hit Me with Your Best Shot" / "One Way or Another" at number eighty-six. In Canada, "I Can't Go for That" / "You Make My Dreams" debuted at number seventy-four, "You and I" / "You and I" at number ninety-three, and "Hit Me with Your Best Shot" / "One Way or Another" at number ninety-five. "Hot for Teacher" did not chart, though it and "Rumour Has It" / "Someone Like You" were both featured on the subsequently released soundtrack album Glee: The Music, Volume 7.
