= The First Time (Glee) =

- Glee episode
- Episode no.: Season 3 Episode 5
- Directed by: Bradley Buecker
- Written by: Roberto Aguirre-Sacasa
- Production code: 3ARC05
- Original air date: November 8, 2011

Guest appearances
- Dot-Marie Jones as Coach Beiste; Max Adler as Dave Karofsky; Damian McGinty as Rory Flanagan; Grant Gustin as Sebastian Smythe; Eric Bruskotter as Cooter Menkins; LaMarcus Tinker as Shane Tinsley; Keong Sim as Mike Chang, Sr.; Tamlyn Tomita as Julia Chang; Curt Mega as Nick

Episode chronology
← Previous "Pot o' Gold"	Next → "Mash Off"
- Glee season 3

"The First Time" is the fifth episode of the third season of the American musical television series Glee, and the forty-ninth overall. Written by Roberto Aguirre-Sacasa and directed by co-executive producer Bradley Buecker, it first aired on Fox in the United States on November 8, 2011. The episode features the preparations for performing West Side Story and the show's opening night, and the various events leading to the decisions by two of the show's student couples—Rachel (Lea Michele) and Finn (Cory Monteith), and Kurt (Chris Colfer) and Blaine (Darren Criss)—to begin having sex.

While an advanced copy of the episode was released to several reviewers and was highly praised by them, the reviewers of the broadcast were not as generally enthusiastic. In particular, some of the plotting and resulting characterization came in for criticism. The performance of "America", however, was widely acclaimed, especially that of Santana (Naya Rivera) in the role of Anita. While the advance publicity about the "first time" events drew some pre-broadcast condemnation, many critics were enthusiastic about the fact that a gay couple was being given such a storyline.

All six songs were released in five singles, available for download. Of these, "Uptown Girl", a song sung by the returning Dalton Academy Warblers, charted on the Billboard Hot 100, and also on the Canadian Hot 100. The remaining songs, all from West Side Story, did not chart. Upon its initial airing, this episode was viewed by 6.91 million American viewers, the lowest of the season, and garnered a 3.1/10 Nielsen rating/share in the 18–49 demographic. The total viewership for this episode was down somewhat from the previous episode, "Pot o' Gold", though ratings were fractionally higher.

== Plot ==
Artie Abrams (Kevin McHale) has taken charge of directing the school musical, West Side Story, and he tells the two leads—Rachel (Lea Michele), playing Maria, and Blaine (Darren Criss), playing Tony—that they are not conveying enough emotion in their rendition of "Tonight". He questions whether they can convincingly portray the roles if they are still virgins. Later, his co-director Coach Beiste (Dot-Marie Jones) confesses to him that she is attracted to football recruiter Cooter Menkins (Eric Bruskotter), who is at McKinley to scout potential players for Ohio State, though she is sure he would never consider her. Artie thinks otherwise, and acting on his advice, Cooter arranges a date with her.

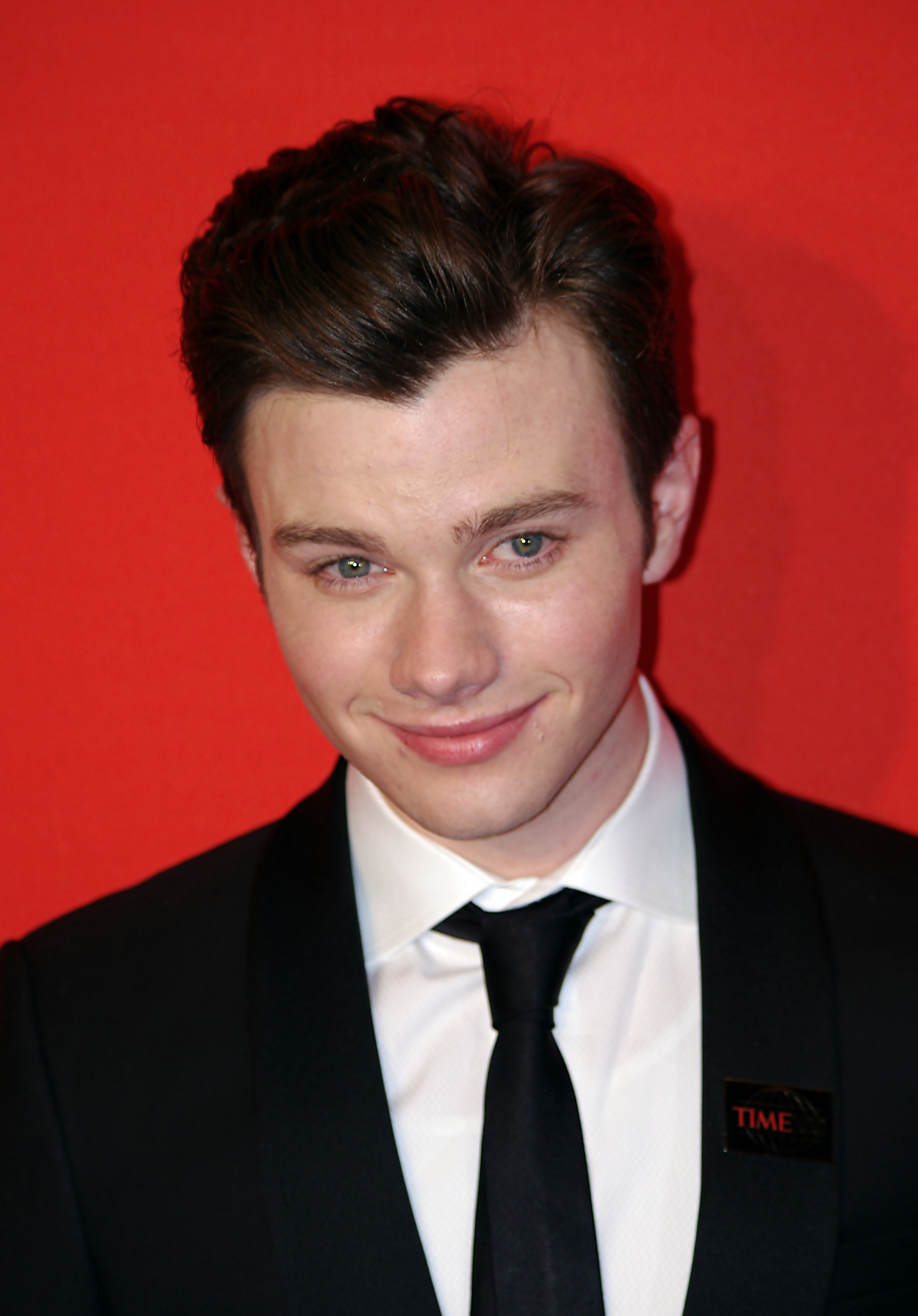
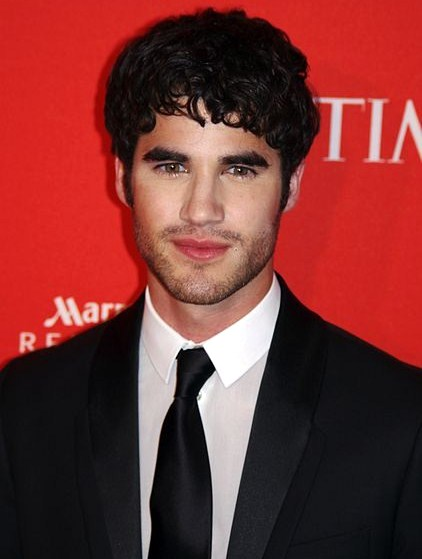
In this episode, Kurt (Colfer, left) and Blaine (Criss, right) make the decision to have sex for the first time.

Blaine and Kurt (Chris Colfer) discuss their decision to postpone sex. Blaine goes to Dalton Academy to invite the Warblers to see him in West Side Story and arrives as they are performing "Uptown Girl". Afterward, new Warbler Sebastian Smythe (Grant Gustin) makes a play for Blaine, intercut with Santana (Naya Rivera) and Rachel singing "A Boy Like That" from the musical. They later meet at a coffee shop, and Kurt arrives as Blaine is telling Sebastian that he already has a boyfriend. Sebastian convinces them to go with him to the local gay bar and supplies fake IDs. While Blaine and Sebastian are dancing, Kurt is surprised to see Dave Karofsky (Max Adler), who has transferred to another school. When Blaine and Kurt leave, Blaine is drunk and aroused, and urges Kurt to have sex with him in the back seat of the car; Kurt refuses, and Blaine angrily walks home.

Rachel lets Finn (Cory Monteith) know that she is interested in having sex with him, but he balks when she admits her reason is to be a better Maria. Later, she asks advice from the other girls in the show. While Santana and Quinn (Dianna Agron) both urge her not to have sex with Finn, Tina (Jenna Ushkowitz) reveals that she and Mike (Harry Shum, Jr.) had sex over the summer and says how wonderful it was with the boy she loved—her words are intercut with Rachel and Santana singing "I Have a Love" in rehearsal. Mike's father (Keong Sim) confronts him about his participation in the musical, and Mike tells him he wants to be a professional dancer, not a doctor. His father disowns him in disbelief, claiming that as long as he wants to be a dancer, he won't be his son anymore.

Cooter recruits Shane (LaMarcus Tinker) for Ohio State, but not Finn, who is despondent about his future. Rachel comforts him, and promises that she will help him find a new future. Back at school, Blaine apologizes to Kurt for getting drunk, and says he cares nothing for Sebastian. Kurt proposes that they go over to Blaine's house for the night.

On opening night, Artie is assailed by self-doubt, but he is thanked by the cast for his leadership, and he thanks them for trusting him. They perform "America", which gets a standing ovation. Blaine and Rachel, waiting to go on and still virgins, are afraid they will not convey the necessary emotion, but Rachel reminds Blaine that they both have found their soulmates in Finn and Kurt, just like Maria and Tony had with each other. As they sing "One Hand, One Heart" on stage, they are also shown in scenes involving their first sexual encounters with their true soulmates.

== Production ==
The episode began filming on September 23, 2011, and ended on October 14, 2011. The last nine days were shot in parallel with the sixth episode, which began shooting on October 6, 2011, and briefly with the seventh episode, which began shooting on October 13, 2011.

Grant Gustin makes his first appearance in this episode, playing a new "major" recurring character, Sebastian Smythe, a "gay Dalton Academy Warbler who sets his sights on Blaine". Gustin won the role after "an exhaustive, weeks-long casting search", and the character is referred to as "promiscuous" and "scheming". Gustin's first day on the Glee set was September 26, 2011. He had been playing the role of Baby John in the touring company of Broadway revival of West Side Story since it opened on September 30, 2010, and left the show after performing on September 23, 2011 to return for his first day with Glee.

Although the Dalton Academy Warblers also return in this episode, they are not voiced by the Tufts Beelzebubs, who sang backgrounds for Warblers numbers in the second season. According to Curt Mega, who sings lead on the Warblers track in this episode, the backgrounds were sung by "Jon Hall, Brock Baker and Luke Edgemon and some others", with the three named men having played on-screen Warblers in the second season. Some of the actors who played Warblers in the second season, including Hall and Mega, returned for the third. After the Warblers were filmed on October 3, 2011, Dominic Barnes, who played Trent in season two, tweeted to Gustin, "very impressive moves today sir", to which Gustin replied, "Thanks bro! Fun stuff!!"

Another "major recurring role" debuts in this episode: Eric Bruskotter joins the cast as Cooter Menkins, "a football recruiter who comes scouting for talent at McKinley, but finds he can't take his eyes off the team's gruff but big-hearted coach." Other recurring guest stars that appear in the episode include football coach Shannon Beiste (Jones), the focus of Cooter's eyes, former prom king Dave Karofsky (Adler), exchange student and new glee club member Rory Flanagan (Damian McGinty), and Mike's parents Julia Chang and Mike Chang, Sr. (Tamlyn Tomita and Sim).

This episode features six covers, five of which are from West Side Story, the stage musical being rehearsed and performed during the course of the episode: "A Boy Like That" and "I Have a Love" sung by Rivera and Michele, "Tonight" and "One Hand, One Heart" sung by Michele and Criss, and the number performed by the Sharks and Jets, "America". The sixth cover, "Uptown Girl", is sung by the Dalton Academy Warblers, with Mega on lead vocal.

== Reception ==
=== Ratings ===
"The First Time" was first broadcast on November 8, 2011 in the United States on Fox. It garnered a 3.1/8 Nielsen rating/share in the 18–49 demographic, and received 6.91 million American viewers during its initial airing, the lowest number of viewers for a new episode in the third season. While the show's viewership was down by over 7% from the 7.47 million for previous new episode, "Pot o' Gold", which was broadcast on November 1, 2011, the rating in the 18–49 demographic increased slightly from the 3.0/8 rating/share received by that episode.

Viewership also decreased in other countries, and hit season lows in the United Kingdom and Australia as well. In the United Kingdom, "The First Time" was watched on Sky1 by 973,000 viewers, down 7% compared to "Pot o' Gold" the previous week, when 1.05 million viewers were watching. In Australia, "The First Time" was watched by 660,000 viewers, which made Glee the fourteenth most-watched program of the night. The viewership was down almost 9% from "Pot o' Gold", which was seen by 724,000 viewers. In Canada, however, viewership was up slightly and 1.66 million viewers watched the episode, which made it the fifteenth most-viewed show of the week, up three slots and over 2% from the 1.62 million viewers who watched "Pot o' Gold" the week before.

=== Pre-broadcast reception ===
Like "Asian F" before it, screener copies of this episode were sent to a number of critics before the show aired. Michael Ausiello of TVLine called it "stellar" and a "standout episode", and Entertainment Weekly's Tim Stack wrote that it was "one of Glee's best installments ever" and an "exceptional episode". Both articles headlined the sexual theme of the episode, and made prominent mention of the fact that both couples would be "having sex for the first time".

Prior to broadcast, Colfer anticipated that the episode's sexual themes and content would prove controversial among television watchdog groups. He said, "I absolutely expect to hear from them, but I think it's handled very sweetly and very emotionally. They're expecting this big, raunchy, suggestive, brainwashing storyline when, really, it's very sweet." Before the episode aired, the conservative Parents Television Council called the show "reprehensible" and the Fox network reckless for "celebrating teen sex".

=== Critical reception ===
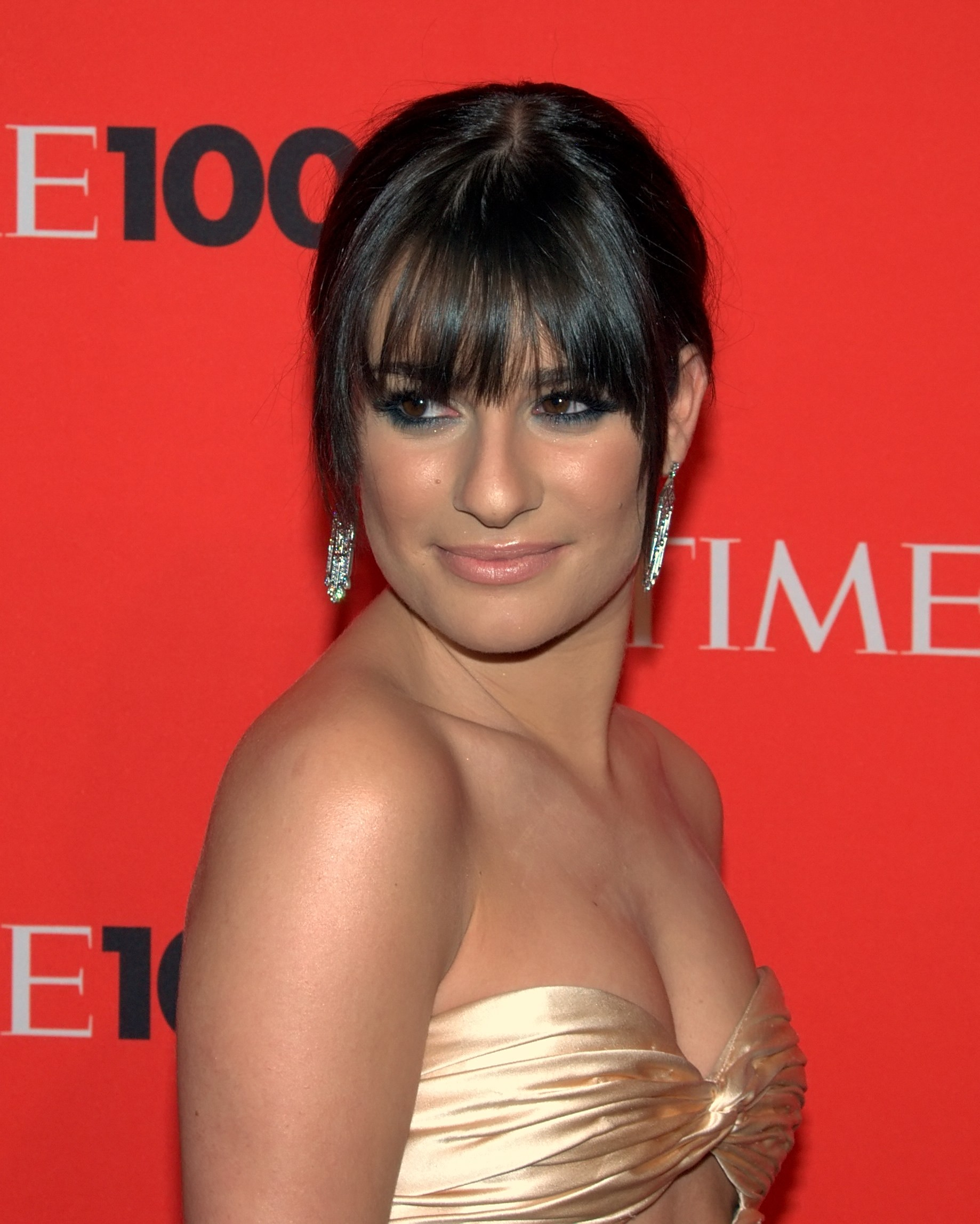
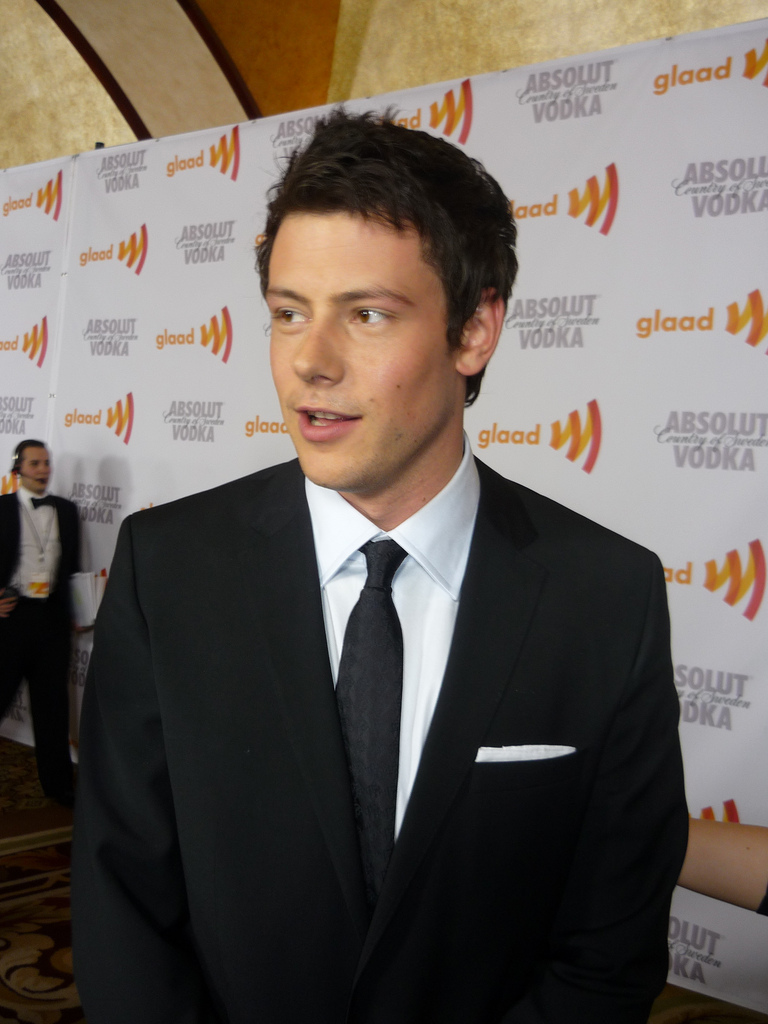
Reviewers were critical of Rachel's (Michele, left) motivations in her decision to have sex with Finn (Monteith, right).

When the show aired, the reviewers were not as uniformly enthusiastic as the screeners. Bobby Hankinson of The Houston Chronicle called this "one of the better episodes in the show's three-season run, though not as good as 'Asian F'". Time's James Poniewozik weighted them differently, calling "The First Time" the "best episode, overall, of Glee season three". Raymund Flandez of The Wall Street Journal said it had "tasteful restraint, subtle playfulness and smoothly woven storylines", and The Atlantic's Kevin Fallon said the episode "treats its characters realistically and send an important message". Robert Canning of IGN gave the episode a "good" grade of 7.5 out of 10. Rolling Stone's Erica Futterman wrote that it was "clinical and awkward", and the "second flatline" episode in a row, though she complimented the four actors playing the two couples as "genuine and relatable". John Kubicek of BuddyTV said that the episode infuriated him "on a grand scale". Amy Reiter of the Los Angeles Times wrote that the episode was "far more nuanced, gentle-hearted and romantic than it sounds—much more about love than about sex", and a number of reviewers agreed, including AOLTV's Crystal Bell. For Hankinson, however, "the teenage lust was played a touch too safe, a bit too romanticized".

Canning said that Kurt and Blaine's "attempts to get a little wild", and "trying to grow up faster than they should", were "the better parts of the episode as they felt the most realistic". Futterman praised their departure from the bar as a "very faithful and honest scene". Emily St. James of The A.V. Club and Kubicek both had issues with Blaine's characterization. The latter asserted that he "just behaves however the writers need him to behave in order for the scene to work", while the former said that Blaine's season three storyline "hasn't been bad by any means, but it does feel like Darren Criss is playing someone who's quite a bit different from the guy he was playing last season". Bell was impressed by the way the characters' relationship "inspires gay youth in a way that we haven't seen on network television yet" and called them "amazing role models for all teens", and Fallon said it was "remarkable" and a "milestone" that "the decision by gay teen characters to lose their virginities is given equal weight to that of a straight couple". Anthony Benigno of The Faster Times characterized the scene with Kurt and Karofsky as "subtle" and "a home run", and Entertainment Weekly's Abby West called it a "perfect little nuanced scene", while Ausiello said it was his "favorite scene of the episode".

Poniewozik complimented the way "Monteith really sold Finn's feeling of being helpless and overmatched", and Canning said that Finn's reaction to Rachel's admission that she wanted to have sex because of the play was a "solid and true moment". Rachel's reasoning, however, came in for harsh criticism: Brett Berk of Vanity Fair said it was "neither believable nor even amusing" that she would try intercourse for such a reason, Bell called her a "dunce", and St. James didn't believe that she would just blurt it out to Finn. The Star-Ledger's Vicki Hyman felt her decision to go all the way did not "ring quite true", and Poniewozik called it "essentially pity sex". Ausiello had a different view—"I would hardly call it pity sex"—and West said she was "going to choose to believe" that Rachel did not have her first time "just to make him feel better".

Several of Artie's scenes came in for criticism. The scene where he advised Rachel and Blaine to have sex was viewed by Poniewozik as "a forced conflict designed to drive the plot" and highly implausible for a number of reasons. Kubicek stated that "acting is about pretending, and if Rachel is really a great actress, she'd be able to play the emotion without needing to have sex". Bell and West made similar points. Rae Votta of Billboard commented on the "weird" plotline that involved Artie and Coach Beiste, for which Kubicek called Artie's actions "inappropriate". While Hyman "liked Artie coming into his own as a director", she called his pre-show jitters "jarring", though she called his final speech "a nice moment", and Benigno characterized it as "a kind of cheesy but actually appropriate speech". Futterman felt it was a "valid and heartwarming point", but "awkwardly slotted in". Poniewozik credited Jones as Coach Beiste with "stunning work", and Kubicek said Beiste's "fragile lack of self-esteem" was "believable and heartfelt" and that Jones was "brilliant".

The scene where Mike is disowned by his father was characterized as "weird" and "tonally off" by St. James and "abrupt and unlikely" by Hyman. Kubicek was even more critical: "the most over-the-top, terribly clichéd scene ever". However, Votta gave "kudos to Glee for sticking with Mike's story this season as he figures out his path", and West wrote that Shum "played it well", while Canning said it and the later scene with his mother "were mighty effective, if a bit stereotypical". Hyman and West also approved of the latter scene.

Sue's absence from the episode was applauded by Bell, who called it "exactly what the show needed". Michael Slezak of TVLine said "the show might be at its best" when Sue and Will "are relegated to benchwarmer status", and Poniewozik "did not miss them one bit". The new Warbler, Sebastian, was said to be "instantly loathsome" by Benigno. His scene with Blaine that was blended with Santana and Rachel singing "A Boy Like That" was variously described as "savvily intercut" by Hyman, "heavy-handed" by Votta, and bringing "the dangers of teen love" to "ferocious life" by Slezak.

Of the ending, Futterman noted that "the final scenes actually wound up truthful to these characters", and Kevin Sullivan of MTV wrote that "when the two separate moments finally did arrive at the end of the episode, it felt like the natural end and was quite touching".

=== Music and performances ===
Supervising Music Editor David Klotz received a Best Sound Editing: Short Form Musical in Television nomination at the 2012 Golden Reel Awards for his work on the episode. The musical performances were generally well received by reviewers, though a few songs came in for some criticism. One that was given near-universal plaudits was "America", from Hankinson's "awesome" to Hyman's "killer rendition" to St James's "one of the best production numbers the show has ever done". The most frequent caveat seemed to be the accents used by the singers; Flandez thought they "could've used a little finesse", and Futterman characterized them as "questionable", though both complimented the performance's dance moves. Santana's performance in the number and the show came in for particular comment: The Hollywood Reporter's Lesley Goldberg called her "completely captivating as Anita", and Rae Votta of Billboard mentioned her "two stand out vocal performances".

Of the four other songs from West Side Story, "Tonight" was given an "A−" and called "pretty wonderful" by Benigno, while Futterman thought it "very sweet, yet very vanilla" and West gave it a "B" and noted it "was lacking something". Slezak gave the musical's songs a collective grade of "A". Although others praised Santana as Anita, Futterman was not impressed with her rendition of "A Boy Like That" and wrote, "Santana's part of the song is not nearly angry or urgent enough and sounds like a watered-down version of what Santana is capable of". West gave the song a "B+", and stated that the song was "stellar for Rachel's fire". Futterman singled out Rachel for "I Have a Love": "Rachel delivers the best vocals of the night with her powerful, yet incredibly high soprano that sounds effortless despite being out of her normal range." Benigno and West both gave "One Hand, One Heart" an "A"; the former called it "wonderful", although he railed about the prevalence of show tunes in the episode, and the latter wrote, "This was the perfect soundtrack to the trio of first times."

The one song that did not come from the musical was "Uptown Girl". Votta said the performance by the Dalton Academy Warblers, with "leads by minor Warbler Nick, played by Curt Mega", was "refreshing and nostalgic all at once, a bright pop musical spot in an episode devoted to Broadway and a reminder of the dominant Dalton presence last season". Bell wrote that the "Warblers were totally born to sing 'Uptown Girl'", and Goldberg called it "among the young season's best" performances. Flandez said it was a "terrific performance", though Benigno was more restrained, and gave it a "B+" despite there being "less innovation" in the a cappella "gimmick", and noted that "the barbershop-quartet finish is actually pretty good". Slezak, however, said the song was the only musical "weak link" in the episode, and Canning called it "too polished". Futterman thought the lead singers were "grating and over-the-top", and Poniewozik characterized the performance as "unfortunate".

=== Chart history ===
One of the six cover versions released as five singles—the "A Boy Like That" single also contained "I Have a Love"—debuted on the Billboard Hot 100: "Uptown Girl" debuted at number sixty-eight. It also debuted on the Canadian Hot 100 at number eighty-three. The other singles, all from West Side Story, did not chart. Two of these singles, "Uptown Girl" and "Tonight", are included on the soundtrack album Glee: The Music, Volume 7.
