= Rachel Berry =

Fictional character from the Fox series Glee

- Glee character
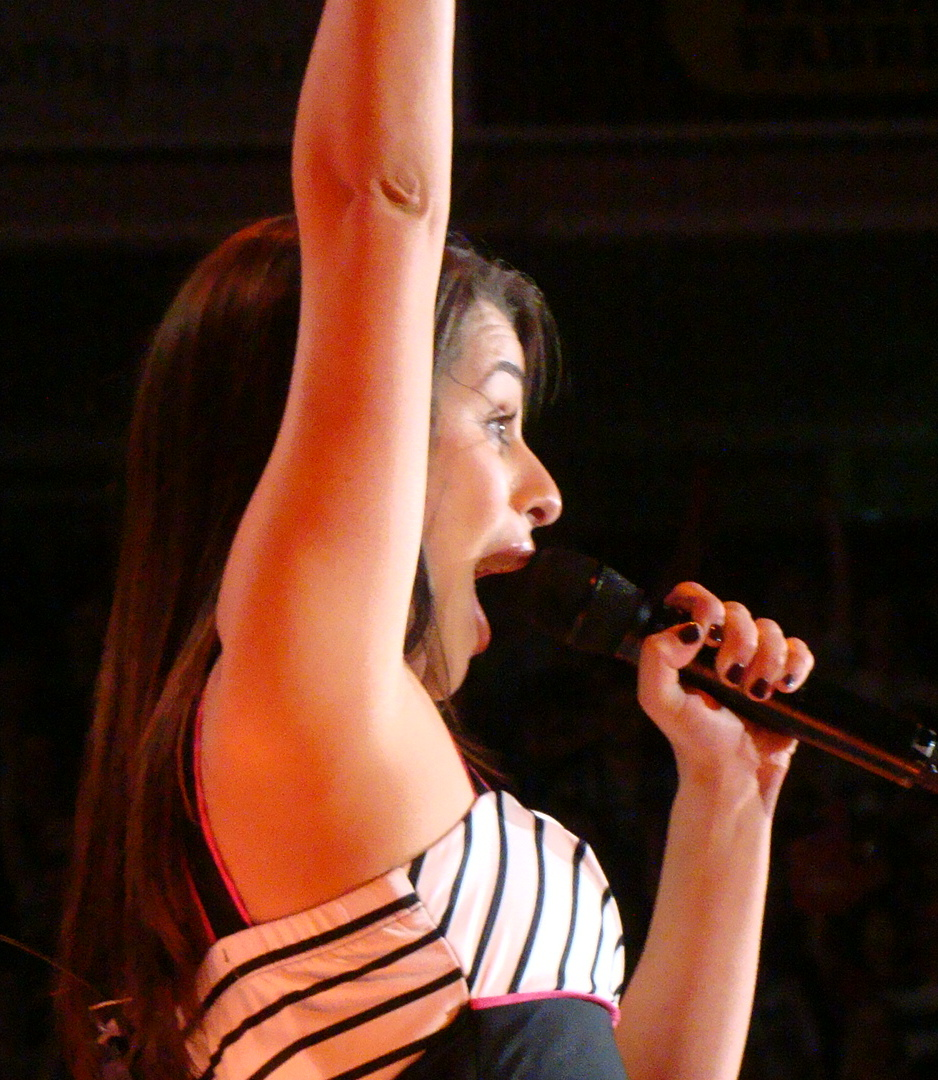
- Lea Michele as Rachel Berry
- First appearance: "Pilot" (2009)
- Last appearance: "Dreams Come True" (2015)
- Created by: Ryan Murphy; Brad Falchuk; Ian Brennan
- Portrayed by: Lea Michele

In-universe information
- Occupation: Actress; Singer; Formerly: High school student College student Waitress Co-director of the glee club
- Family: Hiram Berry (father); LeRoy Berry (father); Shelby Corcoran (biological mother); Beth Corcoran (adoptive sister)
- Spouses: Jesse St. James
- Significant others: Noah Puckerman (ex-boyfriend); Finn Hudson (ex-fiancé, deceased); Brody Weston (ex-boyfriend)
- Religion: Jewish

Rachel Barbra Berry is a fictional character and one of the protagonists on the Fox musical comedy-drama series Glee. The character is portrayed by actress Lea Michele, and appears in Glee from its pilot episode, first broadcast on May 19, 2009. Rachel was developed by Glee creators Ryan Murphy, Brad Falchuk and Ian Brennan. Rachel is a main vocalist in the glee club of the fictional William McKinley High School in Lima, Ohio, where the show is set. She faces alienation and bullying from her peers due to her Broadway ambitions and overbearing personality, but is ultimately kind-hearted and willing to help others, even if her help is sometimes unnecessary. In the show's first season, Rachel develops romantic feelings for Jesse St. James (Jonathan Groff), a member of rival glee club Vocal Adrenaline, as well as quarterback and glee club co-captain Finn Hudson (Cory Monteith), to whom she eventually becomes engaged.

Michele based Rachel on herself when she was younger, and also drew inspiration for the character from films including Election, and television portrayals such as the Gossip Girl character Blair Waldorf. "Rachel will never be popular because her looks aren't considered beautiful," said Michele, "and when I was in high school it was the same for me. I didn't get a nose job, and every single girl around me did. Therefore, I was out. What's so great about Glee is that it shows you how that kind of stuff hurts, but it doesn't matter: You can still be who you want to be."

Rachel is a "strong, driven girl" but somewhat neurotic, and Glee follows Rachel's journey to become more of a team player as well as fulfil her own aspirations. Michele was nominated for the Primetime Emmy Award for Outstanding Lead Actress in a Comedy Series in 2010, and for the Golden Globe Award for Best Actress – Television Series Musical or Comedy in 2010 and 2011 for her performance in the role. Rachel received mostly positive reviews from critics: Maureen Ryan of The Chicago Tribune praised Michele for making the character "more than a humorless stereotype", though The Wall Street Journal‘s Raymund Flandez has described Rachel as "insufferable". Several songs performed by Michele as Rachel were released as singles, available for digital download, and featured on the show's soundtrack albums. Rachel is the most frequently seen character on the series, with “Dynamic Duets”, "The Role You Were Born To Play" and "Shooting Star" (all in season 4) being the only episodes where she does not appear.

== Storylines ==
=== Season 1 ===
Rachel is Jewish. Her fathers named her after Rachel Green from Friends, and her middle name is in honor of Barbra Streisand. She joins the newly reconstituted glee club hoping that fame will increase her popularity and help her find a boyfriend. She is framed for stealing solos by Sandy Ryerson who gets fired for inappropriate interactions with a student, bullied by members of the school cheerleading and football teams, but is pleased when self-centered quarterback Finn Hudson joins the club, developing a crush on him. The two share a kiss in the episode "Showmance", although he asks her not to tell anyone and continues dating his jealous girlfriend, cheerleader Quinn Fabray (Dianna Agron). Rachel quits the glee club when she is not assigned a solo she wanted and takes the lead role in the school musical, Cabaret, unaware that Sue Sylvester was using the musical as a means of destroying the glee club by luring away their most talented member. Finn uses Rachels feelings for him to try and get her to return to glee and takes her on a bowling date where they kiss again. Rachel finds out he was only using her as a means of getting a music scholarship to one day take care of his and Quinn's baby. Finn apologizes and insists he has feelings for her, but she's angry and slaps him and refuses to rejoin the club. However, she later quits the musical and rejoins the glee club when she realizes that she would rather be in a group in which she has friends. She has a brief relationship with another glee club member, Puck (Mark Salling), who is also Jewish, and is a football player who used to bully her, but she breaks up with him due to her continuing feelings for Finn. She later discovers and reveals to Finn that Quinn's baby isn't his, but that Puck is the father. Finn attacks Puck, breaks up with Quinn, and drops out of New Directions. He returns the day of the group's first major competition, the Sectionals, to undo sabotage by cheerleading coach Sue Sylvester (Jane Lynch); the group makes up a completely new set list, which Rachel opens with a solo of "Don't Rain on My Parade", and New Directions wins by unanimous decision.

For a short time Rachel believes that she is dating Finn, but he tells her that he needs to take time out for himself. He changes his mind soon after, but Rachel has already begun dating Jesse St. James (Jonathan Groff), the lead singer of rival glee club Vocal Adrenaline. The rest of the glee club presses Rachel to break off with Jesse believing he is just a spy, but he transfers to William McKinley and joins New Directions, which defuses their concerns. Finn is quite jealous of Jesse and serenades Rachel by singing Rick Springfield's Jessie's Girl in glee club. Rachel tells Jesse that her dream is to find her birth mother and surrogate, and he offers to help her do so. However, he already knows who it is: Vocal Adrenaline coach Shelby Corcoran (Idina Menzel), who has asked Jesse to befriend Rachel so that she might reconnect with her daughter, whom she is not allowed to contact directly until Rachel is eighteen. When Rachel discovers that Shelby is her mother, they both confess to not feeling an immediate attachment and eventually decide not to pursue a relationship. Jesse betrays Rachel and returns to Vocal Adrenaline, leaving her devastated after throwing eggs at her in the parking lot at McKinley. Finn and Puck attempt to avenge Rachel by slashing the tires of all Vocal Adrenaline members cars but Shelby catches them. Rachel later kisses Finn after he gives her a pep talk about her being glee s true leader and it appears they are finally officially a couple. In the episode "Journey to Regionals", as Finn and Rachel are about to go onstage at Regionals, Finn tells her that he loves her. New Directions loses to Vocal Adrenaline which means their glee club will be shut down. Rachel gathers the club together to show their appreciation to Mr Schue as their mentor. As it happens Sue Sylvester helped save the club for one more year.

=== Season 2 ===
At the start of season 2 Rachel is shown to be very insecure. Rachel recruits a potential new glee recruit (Sunshine Corazon (Jake Zyrus)) but later feels disheartened by her talent and in revenge after Sue silences her in the bathroom, sending her to an inactive crack house. In the end this action angers her teammates except for Finn who is kicked off the Football team for his bad behavior, and Sunshine ends up transferring to Carmel High and joining Vocal Adrenaline thanks to an evil plot from diabolical cheer coach Sue Sylvester (Jane Lynch). Rachel is happy when Finn is temporarily cut from the football team, feeling if they are both unpopular, they are more even in their relationship, but is disappointed in him after he throws a tantrum in front of Sam Evans and Coach Beiste whom he bullied to get kicked off. When he gets back on the team, she initially asks him to quit but later apologizes, saying she needs to trust him and allow him to grow. Despite these tests, their relationship remains quite strong through the beginning of season two and they vow never to break up with each other. The two work together to throw the glee club's duets competition so newcomer Sam Evans (Chord Overstreet) wins instead. Rachel eventually discovers that Finn slept with cheerleader Santana Lopez (Naya Rivera) the previous year while Rachel was dating Jesse, and lied about it, though Rachel herself had lied and said she had slept with Jesse when she hadn't; hurt, she makes out with Puck to hurt Finn back; this betrayal causes Finn to break up with her. Rachel tries to win him back, but he instead rekindles his feelings for Quinn and starts dating her. Wounded by Quinn telling her that the two of them are back together, Rachel writes an original song for Regionals, "Get It Right", and when New Directions wins, is named the club's competition MVP.

Just before junior prom, Jesse returns, having flunked out of UCLA, and Rachel invites him to the prom with her, Sam and Mercedes (Amber Riley). Jesse and Finn are kicked out of the prom when an obviously jealous Finn picks a fight with Jesse for kissing Rachel on the dance floor, which effectively ends Finn and Quinn's campaign for prom king and queen. Finn ultimately breaks up with Quinn when he realizes he has a deeper connection with Rachel. At Nationals, Finn invites Rachel on a date and takes her to Sardi's restaurant. He tries to kiss her but she denies him and walks away. Later as the New Directions are about to go on stage, Finn begs Rachel to get back together with him, but though she professes her love, she refuses, still torn between her love for New York and Broadway and her love for him. At the end of their duet—"Pretending", a song written by Finn for Rachel —an enthusiastic audience falls silent when Rachel and Finn share a long passionate unscripted kiss; the glee club comes in twelfth. Back in Ohio, Rachel and Finn discuss their loss and agree it was worth it since they are now back together. Finn reminds Rachel that she has a year until graduation and moving to New York; he kisses her, and their relationship resumes.

=== Season 3 ===
Rachel, along with Kurt, plans to attend a performing arts school in New York City after graduation. School counselor Emma Pillsbury (Jayma Mays) suggests they consider The New York Academy of Dramatic Arts (NYADA), a highly desirable school. The two attend an Ohio "mixer" for potential applicants, only to discover that their competition is very much like them, and quite talented. Rachel proposes that McKinley do West Side Story as the school musical, since she believes herself to be a shoo-in for the lead role, Maria, and she needs the experience for her NYADA application. However, Mercedes also auditions for Maria, and the directors, unable to decide between the two of them even after head-to-head callbacks, decide to double-cast the role, giving Rachel and Mercedes each a week of the two-week run. Mercedes, believing she did better in the callbacks, refuses to accept the double-casting and withdraws from the show, leaving Rachel to be Maria. She and Finn decide to have sex in the episode "The First Time". In the episode "Mash Off", Rachel abruptly withdraws from the race for senior class president in favor of Kurt after she realizes he might not get into NYADA with her if he doesn't win. She goes even further in the next episode, "I Kissed a Girl", when she stuffs an election ballot box in Kurt's favor to keep him from losing. He loses anyway, and she confesses: she is suspended from school for a week and forbidden to compete in Sectionals with New Directions, though the glee club wins without her. At the end of the episode "Yes/No", Finn asks her to marry him, and after hesitating for several days, she accepts. Their parents find out in "Heart", and hope to discourage the pair, but their plans backfire and the wedding date is moved up to May. Even that date seems too distant, so Rachel and Finn later decide to marry after Regionals in "On My Way".

New Directions wins at Regionals, and hours later the ceremony is about to begin at City Hall, with their parents still hoping to prevent it from occurring. Rachel is waiting for Quinn, who had gone home to get her bridesmaid dress, to arrive. Quinn's car is hit by a truck as the episode ends. The wedding is called off, though the engagement remains on. In the episode "Choke", Rachel auditions for NYADA in front of formidable judge Carmen Tibideaux (Whoopi Goldberg) but forgets the words to a song she has known since she was a child, and the audition abruptly ends. In "Prom-asaurus" Rachel is still upset about her choke and organizes an "anti-prom" with Kurt, Blaine, Becky and Puck. She later realizes she is missing one of the best nights of her life and attends the prom with Finn and is voted Prom Queen by secret ballot (altered by Quinn), in a similar situation to Kurt the previous year. Rachel doesn't give up on her dream and sends Carmen Tibideaux fourteen messages and pesters her to give Rachel another chance at the audition, even driving to one of Tibideaux's tryouts with Tina. Her persistence (and Tina's help) persuade Ms. Tibideaux to come and see Rachel perform with New Directions at Nationals in Chicago (unbeknownst to Rachel). In "Nationals" Rachel performs Celine Dion's "It's All Coming Back To Me Now" and gets a standing ovation from the observing Carmen Tibideaux. New Directions return to McKinley as National Show Choir Champions and Rachel presents Mr. Schuester with the Teacher of the Year award. After Rachel graduates from McKinley, she finds out that she was accepted into NYADA. However, both Finn and Kurt were rejected from their colleges. At first, she decides to defer her acceptance so that she can help them both. However, Finn takes Rachel to the train station and sacrifices their relationship for Rachel's dreams. She gets off at Grand Central and walks down the streets of New York.

=== Season 4 ===
In the season premiere "The New Rachel", Rachel is struggling to accept her separation from Finn. She meets Brody Weston (Dean Geyer), a handsome NYADA junior, who encourages Rachel to move on and embrace college life. Rachel also deals with her overpowering dance instructor Cassandra July (Kate Hudson), who believes that Rachel does not have what it takes to become a star. After Kurt comes to New York, the two decide to move in together while Kurt pursues an internship with Vogue.com and plans to reapply to NYADA for the second semester. In the episode "Makeover", Rachel gets picked on by a group of female dancers for her childish appearance. With the help of Kurt and his new boss Isabelle Wright (Sarah Jessica Parker), she is convinced to get a makeover. Her new look is met with positive reception from others, including Brody, and she invites him over to dinner. Right after their first kiss, Rachel discovers Finn on her doorstep. While visiting, Rachel learns that Finn was medically discharged from the army several weeks ago and that he no longer wants to live in New York after seeing how happy she is without him. Finn takes off and goes back to Lima where Rachel confronts him and says that even though she loves him, she can no longer stay in their relationship. She and Brody begin to see each other, and she lets him move in so that they can be closer. When she returns for Will and Emma's wedding, she and Finn reconnect as friends. When Finn asks about Brody, she says they are not exclusive. Finn says that the reason she has not committed to Brody is because she still thinks they will end up together. They sleep together after the reception, but Rachel leaves after Finn falls asleep. She is later shown taking a pregnancy test; Santana, who has recently moved in, snoops and discovers the discarded test, and confronts Rachel, who then bursts into tears. The two go together to get Rachel checked at a clinic, where she is informed that it was a false alarm. She later breaks up with Brody after Santana reveals that he is a male escort and is stunned to find out Finn flew to New York just to beat him up. When Rachel breaks up with Brody, she admits that the relationship never would have worked because she was using it to try to get over her heartache about Finn. Rachel auditions for Funny Girl and sings "Don't Stop Believin'", imagining the original New Directions members singing in the background. She is called back for further auditions for the title role, Fanny Brice. In the finale, Rachel sings "To Love You More" at the final callback before the role is cast.

=== Season 5 ===
In "The Quarterback", Rachel is devastated with the loss of Finn. Michele, who in real life was dating Cory Monteith, had asked to postpone this episode until everyone was ready. Rachel doesn't appear in this episode until the very end where she states, "Before Finn, I used to sing alone, this was one of the songs we would sing when we drove around together." She sings "Make You Feel My Love". Later in the episode, she states that Finn was her person and that they were always going to be together. Later in the season, it is revealed that she got a tattoo of Finn's name (despite telling Kurt that she chickened out when they went to the tattoo shop). Rachel hires Santana to be her publicist, which leads her to take on a charitable cause with a local rescue kennel. She performs with Mercedes and Santana on stage for the benefit, Broadway Bitches, but the publicity stunt goes wrong when the dogs pull her down and drag her for several blocks. Despite this, Santana reassures her and they discuss the next step in their campaign. Rachel lands the lead on the Broadway show, Funny Girl. Santana offers to be Rachel's understudy when Rachel is stuck in Los Angeles for a television show audition. Before the opening, she suffers from a bout of self-doubt, but performs after Santana gives her a pep talk. Lee Paulblatt, a Fox Television executive, sees Rachel perform, and is so impressed, he informs her he wants to cast her in an upcoming, untitled television pilot. He has her meet with famed screenwriter, Mary Halloran, who will be creating the script. After the first meeting, Rachel is confused by Mary's ideas and idiosyncratic behavior. Rachel has the group review Mary's script, and everyone agrees it is terrible (except Brittany). Rachel meets with Mary and tells her that the lead character does not sound like her. Mary points out that television viewers want anti-heroes, but Rachel responds by singing, and Mary, uncharacteristically, is moved and made happy by the performance. She agrees to redo the script, but warns Rachel that the network will never make a pilot from it. Eventually, the network loves the script and calls Rachel, and she moves to LA to start shooting her pilot.

=== Season 6 ===
In the final season premiere, "Loser Like Me", it is revealed that Rachel's pilot bombed. It got extremely low ratings and the show was quickly cancelled. Having burned her bridges on Broadway, Rachel retreats home to Lima and discovers that her fathers are divorcing and her house is being sold. Much to her dismay, Sue has disbanded all arts from McKinley and Rachel approaches the Superintendent to reboot the glee club with her remaining TV money to fund it. He agrees as long as she runs the club. With the help of the newly broken-up Kurt, she restarts the New Directions, which angers Sue. She calls her old friends and former fellow glee club members Quinn, Santana, Brittany, Puck, Artie, Mercedes, and Tina to help her, and Kurt recruits students to join the glee club; he gets one student, Roderick, to audition. Blaine, the head coach for the Dalton Academy Warblers, desperately tries to get a female student named Jane to join the Warblers, despite the members' objections. Jane eventually chooses to transfer to McKinley to join the New Directions after a brief coaching with Rachel, much to Blaine's dismay. By the end, Rachel has 4 members of the glee club. During her time as McKinley's faculty, she bonds with Sam, who is the assistant of Coach Beiste, and develops a crush on him, despite him only being hypnotized by Sue to distract Rachel. Sam backs off, stating he is still in love with Mercedes, which makes her sad. At Mercedes' suggestion, she auditions for Broadway again. Rachel struggles to move on from her old house after it is sold, and her friends and students cheer her up with a farewell party. Later, Rachel plans on applying for readmission to NYADA, and she is accepted, but is torn between Broadway or college. Despite Jesse St. James' suggestion that she work with him on a Broadway musical, she chooses NYADA. She announces that after Regionals is over, she will be departing from McKinley to go back to NYADA again. At the beginning of the series finale, "Dreams Come True", she is seen going to the New Directions competition to assist them. She does make it big on Broadway, marries Jesse, and becomes a surrogate mother to Kurt and Blaine's child. She wins a Tony Award, and thanks everyone on stage, especially Mr. Schuester. In the final minutes of the series, she performs OneRepublic's "I Lived" with almost every former member of New Directions and the adults during the rededication of McKinley's auditorium to Finn Hudson. Rachel then takes a final bow with the rest of the cast.

== Development ==
=== Casting and creation ===
Rachel is portrayed by Lea Michele, and as a child played by Lauren Boles. In casting Glee, series creator Ryan Murphy sought out actors who could identify with the rush of starring in theatrical roles. Instead of using traditional network casting calls, he spent three months on Broadway, where he found Lea Michele, who starred in Spring Awakening. The role of Rachel was written specifically for Michele. In an interview with The Washington Post, Michele commented on her casting, saying, "I was kind of just thrown into this—this is one of the first television jobs I've ever had. Of course being able to sing helps bring a sense of comfort. The character I'm playing is really outgoing—she performs in her everyday life as though she's performing in front of a huge audience."

In December 2010, Ryan Murphy announced that the cast of Glee would be replaced at the end of the season 3 to coincide with their graduation. Murphy said, "Every year we're going to populate a new group. There's nothing more depressing than a high schooler with a bald spot." He also revealed that some of the original cast would leave as early as 2012, "I think you have to be true to the fact that here is a group of people who come and go in these teachers' lives." Murphy said in July 2011 that Michele would be one of the actors leaving at the end of the third season, and Michele commented on the matter, saying, "We always knew we'd graduate in real time. It's all part of the plan and it's all good! It's going to make Season 3 amazing! This is just the beginning!" However, Falchuk later stated that while Michele, along with Chris Colfer and Cory Monteith, would graduate at the end of the third season, "Because they're graduating doesn't mean they're leaving the show." Falchuk insisted, "It was never our plan or our intention to let them go... They are not done with the show after this season."

Sandra Gonzalez of Entertainment Weekly commented on the original news that several characters would be leaving the cast when they graduated, and said, "Indeed, a rolling cast list has done some shows good in the past. I'll admit that it took me some time to warm up to the 'new kids' on Friday Night Lights, which ends its run tomorrow on NBC, but it was a well-done transition. What I loved most was that the new blood didn't try to be the new versions of the old characters. They were new characters with completely different outlooks and goals. Glee could learn a lot from what Friday Night Lights accomplished: a seamless, realistic transition. The problem? 'Seamless' and 'realistic' have never been Glee's strong points, which is not to say they couldn't be. But the question is: Is Glee looking to be the less-attractive comedy cousin of Friday Night Lights... or Saved By the Bell: The New Class?"

=== Characterization ===
Michele took the role because of Rachel's characterization, and explained, "Not only is she a singer, but she has so much heart—I think it's what we need on TV. A show that is filled with heart and love that is funny. It sends an amazing message to kids about the arts and being who you are." Michele described the first thirteen episodes of the series as "Rachel's journey of finding herself within the Glee club", and said that "she's learning how to be a team player and work within this group. She's a very strong, driven girl, who's sometimes a little misunderstood."

Glee's costume designer Lou Eyrich described Rachel's costuming in an interview with Entertainment Weekly, "Originally, the inspiration for her look was Tracy Flick from Election—very buttoned-down, preppy, obnoxious, squeaky clean, nerdy. But she's got at least 12 costume changes each episode. That same look all the time just gets boring for the screen and for the actress to wear, so we spread it out a lot. We try to have her buttoned-up or wearing a nerdy sweater over a cute dress, like she doesn't quite get it right. Or she takes that sweater and tucks it into the skirt and pairs it with knee highs and flats. She makes it her way, which is more quirky. The popular girls find a way to make it look cool, but Rachel makes it look nerdy. But it's not old-school nerdy with thick glasses and pocket protectors. She thinks she's taking a trend and making it cool, but she wears it wrong."

Rachel Berry has also been characterized to be unable to read, as in the show there is countless times where a script is in front of her and she is unable to read the legible words.

Michele based Rachel on herself when she was younger and also drew inspiration from the film Election, and the Gossip Girl character Blair Waldorf (Leighton Meester). She explained, "[Blair] is shady, but you still love her. She's still vulnerable. That's what I try to do with Rachel. Rachel will never be popular because her looks aren't considered beautiful, and when I was in high school it was the same for me. I didn't get a nose job, and every single girl around me did. Therefore, I was out. I was not cool. What's so great about Glee is that it shows you how that kind of stuff hurts, but it doesn't matter: You can still be who you want to be. And in four years, high school will be over and all of that crap won't matter anyway."

== Reception ==
=== Critical response ===
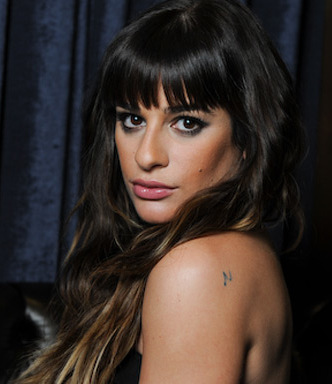
A number of songs performed by Michele as Rachel have been released as singles.

Several songs performed by Michele as Rachel were released as singles, available for digital download, also featuring on the soundtracks Glee: The Music, Volume 1 and Glee: The Music, Volume 2. Rachel received positive reviews from critics. The role saw Michele nominated for the Primetime Emmy Award for Outstanding Lead Actress in a Comedy Series at the 2010 ceremony, which were hosted on August 29; and for the Golden Globe Award for Best Actress – Television Series Musical or Comedy at the 2010 Golden Globe Awards. Robert A. George of the New York Post deemed Rachel "the only female [in Glee] who doesn't come across as manipulative or vapidly helpless", while the Chicago Tribune's Maureen Ryan wrote, "Lea Michele not only has an amazing voice but manages to make her character, spoiled diva Rachel Berry, more than a humorless stereotype." Denise Martin of the Los Angeles Times commented in her review of the episode "The Rhodes Not Taken", "If there's any justice in the world, Lea Michele will win a Golden Globe and an Emmy for playing Rachel".

Following the episode "Hairography" in which Rachel is badly made-over by Kurt, Mike Hale of The New York Times noted a popular theme amongst critics for negatively highlighting the way Glee treated its female characters. He said that while he understood this stance, he generally disagreed with it as the show treated male characters equally poorly. However, he wrote that "it was a bit much when Finn looked at Rachel in her catsuit and frizzy hair and said she looked like a 'sad clown hooker.' Come on. She looked fantastic." Zap2it's Korbi Ghosh deemed Rachel's high point on the show romancing of Finn and Puck, commenting: "when we saw Rachel fall for them, she was actually relatable. Likable even. The type-A, uber-talented, self-involved know-it-all who's usually alienating her classmates let her guard down to expose a vulnerable side. And, as a bonus, we got some super solid musical performances from those awkward courtships."

Conversely, Ghosh assessed her low point as being her romancing of Will, writing, "Sure, Schue's got it going on, what with the rapping, the break dancing, the boy band'ing and the lindy hopping too. But Rachel's eye-on-the-prize, I'll-get-what-I-want attitude coupled with her inappropriate crush on the teacher just made her creepier than usual. Infiltrating his home, cooking and cleaning for him right under his crazy wife's nose. Come on, Berry, you're better than that..." Raymund Flandez for The Wall Street Journal commented on the episode "Preggers", "Rachel has become insufferable. The disagreements with Mr. Schue about her own development as a bonafide triple-threat have branded her as an overbearing prima donna to the rest of Glee." Eric Goldman for IGN agreed, "It's hard not to be annoyed by Rachel". James Poniewozik of Time suggested that Rachel's negative character traits were actually an asset, commenting on her performance of "Don't Rain on My Parade" in the episode "Sectionals", "The number reminded me how much I like what the show's done with Rachel: she's a lead character, yet the show allows her to be annoying—but at the same time, her dedication makes her likeable. And as we see here, as much of a pill as she can be, her ability to whip out a performance she's been working on since age four is an asset."

AfterEllen.com ranked her No. 18 in their Top 50 Favorite Female TV Characters.

=== Accolades ===
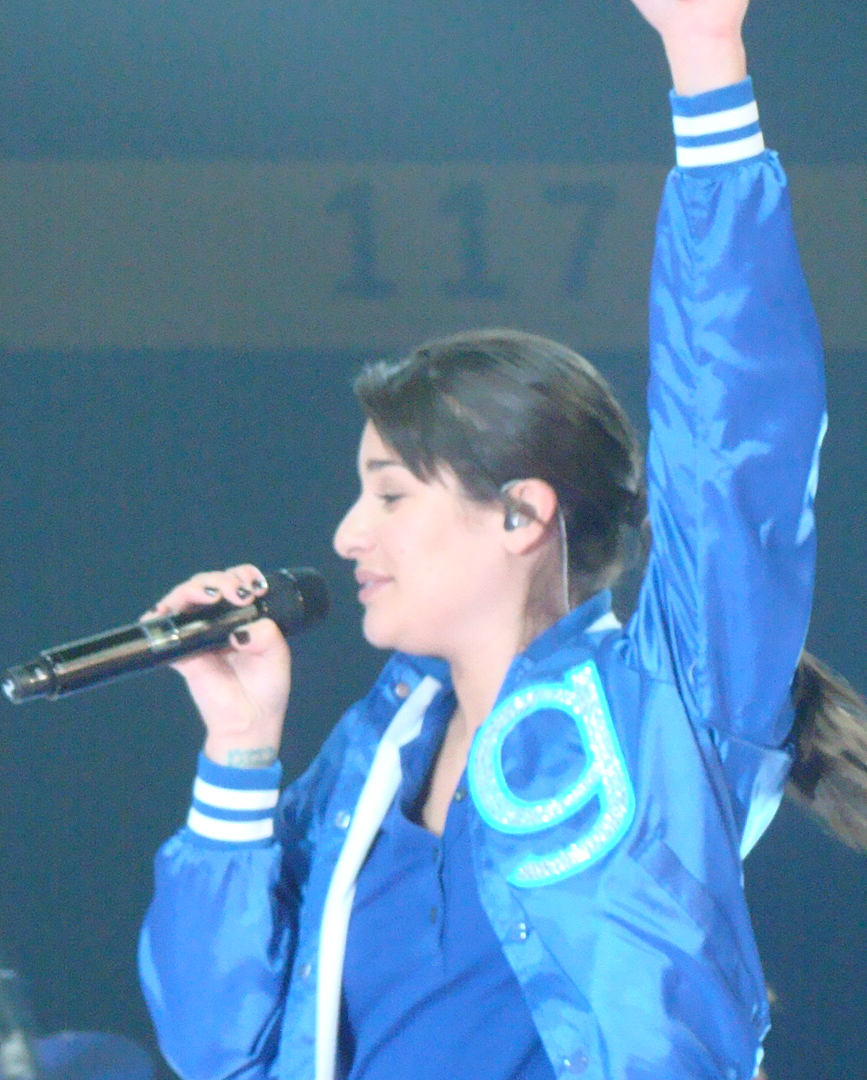
Lea Michele as Rachel Berry, performing "Somebody to Love".

Michele won a number of awards for her portrayal of Rachel. At the 2009 Satellite Awards, she won the award for Best Performance by an Actress in a Musical or Comedy Television Series. Michele was part of the Glee ensemble cast that was awarded Outstanding Performance by an Ensemble in a Comedy Series at the 16th Screen Actors Guild Awards. In 2010, Michele won the NewNowNext Awards for Brink of Fame: Actor. The role has also garnered Michele numerous award nominations. In 2009, she was nominated for a Teen Choice Award in the category "Choice TV Breakout Star". That same year, Michele was nominated for a Golden Globe Award in the category Best Actress – Television Series Musical or Comedy, and an Emmy Award for Outstanding Lead Actress in a Comedy Series. She received another Teen Choice Award nomination in 2010 for "Choice TV Actress: Comedy". Michele was included in Time's 2010 list of the 100 Most Influential People in the World. Her cover of The All-American Rejects' "Gives You Hell" reached the top 40 on the US Billboard 200. Michele was featured as lead singer in 14 of the top 20 selling Glee Cast songs as of 2010. She won the 2012 and 2013 People's Choice Award for Favorite TV Comedy Actress.

Michele was nominated for two Grammy Awards in 2011. The first for Best Pop Performance by a Duo or Group with Vocals ("Don't Stop Believin'"), and the second for Best Compilation Soundtrack Album for a Motion Picture, Television, or Other Visual Media (Glee: The Music, Volume 1). Michele said of the first Grammy nomination: "I like that it's for "Don't Stop Believin'" which is for the whole cast, so that we all get to go. That's just awesome." She was nominated again for Best Actress – Television Series Musical or Comedy at the 2011 Golden Globe Awards. The cast of Glee was also nominated for the Screen Actors Guild Award for Outstanding Performance by an Ensemble in a Comedy Series at the 2011 and 2012 ceremonies.
