= Rumour Has It (Adele song) =

2011 song by Adele

Single by Adele

from the album 21
- Released: 5 November 2011
- Studio: AIR (London); Metropolis (London); Patriot (Denver, CO); Serenity Sound (Hollywood, CA); Wendyhouse (London)
- Genre: Pop rock; blues; soul
- Length: 3:43
- Label: XL; Columbia
- Songwriters: Adele Adkins; Ryan Tedder
- Producer: Ryan Tedder

Adele singles chronology
"Set Fire to the Rain" (2011)	"Rumour Has It" (2011)	"Turning Tables" (2011)

Audio video
- "Rumour Has It" on YouTube

"Rumour Has It" is a song recorded by English singer-songwriter Adele for her second studio album, 21 (2011). The song was written by Adele and Ryan Tedder; the latter is also the producer. Adele has stated that the song was not inspired by the media but it was aimed at her own friends who believed 'rumours' they read about her in tabloids. It was released on 5 November 2011 as the fourth single from the album in the United Kingdom.

"Rumour Has It" garnered critical acclaim, with reviewers praising the lyrics, its catchiness, Tedder's production, and Adele's vocal performance. Even without having been released as a single, the song charted on the Billboard Hot 100 at number 16 and topped the Adult album alternative chart. It also reached the top 10 in Iceland. The single is certified 2× Platinum by the RIAA for sales of over 2 million copies in the US. It was featured in the television shows Ringer and The Lying Game. Adele added the song to the set list on her second worldwide tour Adele Live.

== Background ==
"Rumour Has It" was written by Adele and Ryan Tedder and produced by Tedder. Talking about the collaboration with Tedder on "Rumour Has It", Adele revealed: "You can really tell when you hear a Ryan Tedder song, which I liked, but I wanted to come out with something that would surprise everyone when it was us two put together, so we came out with this sort of bluesy-pop stomping song really." Adele explained that the song was not inspired by the media, but was aimed at her own friends, who frequently spread rumours about her break-up with her boyfriend: "People might think it's about blogs and magazines and papers, but it's not. It's about my own friends believing stuff that they hear about me, which is pretty mortifying really." Adele said that "Rumour Has It" and "Rolling in the Deep" were lyrically opposite of "Someone Like You". She said that she wrote "Someone Like You" after she was tired of "being such a bitch" with "Rolling in the Deep" or "Rumour Has It."

On 28 October 2011, during an interview with Billboard, Columbia Records revealed that "Rumour Has It" would be released as the third US single from the album and serviced to pop and adult contemporary radio. However, the release of the song was scrapped and "Set Fire to the Rain" was released instead on 21 November 2011. Columbia explained: "Our research found more programmer preference for 'Set Fire to the Rain'. [...] Both 'Rumour' and 'Fire' came back strong, but 'Fire' was a bit stronger. [...] It's a better plan to go with 'Fire' over 'Rumour' at pop and adult radio." After the 54th Grammy Awards, held on 12 February 2012, "Rumour Has It" was then released as the fourth single.

== Composition ==
"Rumour Has It"
A 22-second sample of "Rumour Has It", described by Adele as a "bluesy pop stomping song".

"Rumour Has It" was described by The A.V. Club as "a soul-strutter" while AllMusic as being a "blues-inflected" song while Adele described as a "bluesy pop stomping song". Noel Murray of The A.V. Club found a "persuasive backbeat", comparing the song to Adele's earlier material during her first studio album 19 (2008) due to their similar instrumentation consisting of piano and guitars. Ian Wade of BBC Online wrote that the song "channels the avenging rock'n'roll soul of Wanda Jackson." Tom Townshend of MSN Music found a "similar primal stomp" to "Rolling in the Deep" (2010) which made a "pacey, hypnotic, funk, interrupted by sublime symphonic blues." According to the sheet music published by Universal Music Publishing Group at the website Musicnotes.com, "Rumour Has It" is written in the key of D minor. It is set in a time signature of common time with an up-tempo beat of 126 beats per minute. Adele's vocal ranges from the note of D_{3} to the note of E6.

== Lyrics ==
The lyrics of the song are written in two stanzas, with the repetition of a simple chorus repeating the short phrase "Rumour has it" in each instance of the chorus. In the first two repetitions of the Chorus, the phrase is repeated 8 times in each instance, while in the third and final repetition of the Chorus, the short phrase "Rumour has it" is repeated 14 times. The first stanza of the song has the singer confronting her boyfriend about his new love interest and reminding him that he does not have any history with her compared to the history he has with her stating: "You and I have history, or don't you remember?" In the second stanza, she further confronts her boyfriend about his superficial attachment to a much younger woman stating: "She is half your age/ Though I'm guessing that's why you strayed," suggesting that his straying may have the consequences of her losing her affection for him.

== Critical reception ==
The song received critical acclaim. While reviewing 21, Matt Collar of AllMusic concluded that "Rumour Has It" and "He Won't Go" are "terrifically catchy, booty-shaking numbers, and exactly the kind of songs you want and expect from Adele." Noel Murray of The A.V. Club wrote that the song was "overpowering", while Leah Greenblatt of Entertainment Weekly praised Adele's voice comparing it with The Shangri-Las. Chris Parkin of NME called it "a swamp song so perfectly shadowy David Lynch might be fond of it." Jon Caramanica of The New York Times found "hollow counterpoint vocals, and a daringly morbid bridge that jerks away from the song's rhythm, before once again acceding to it." Matthew Cole of Slant Magazine concluded that when Adele sings an adventurous arrangement like the "spooky Tin Pan Alley blues" on "Rumour Has It", she "sounds every bit the phenomenon the press has made her out to be." Joanne Dorken of MTV UK said that the song is a "bluesy/soul anthem [which] shows a more sassy side to Adele. With its banging drums, infectious beats and cheeky lyrics, you can't help but tap your feet to this up-tempo number from Miss Adkins." PopMatters' Jer Fairall called "Rumour Has It" a "booming John Barry homage." The writers of Rolling Stone placed the song at number 29 on their list of "50 Best Singles of 2011".

A writer of URB compared Adele's voice with a "'[19]40s, piano-vixen lounge singer." John Murphy of musicOMH wrote that "Rumour Has It has more sass, a brilliant blues/soul anthem with more fantastic drumming and a cute lyrical twist at the end." While reviewing 21, Gary McGinley of No Ripcord called the song a "potential single" from the album, while Ian Wade of BBC Online called it a "literally banging" song. Jim Farber of Daily News wrote that Adele "mined a bayou stomp" the catchy "Rumour Has It." Allison Stewart of The Washington Post wrote that "'Rumour Has It' is set in a fictional universe where Dusty Springfield fronts the Ronettes." Sputnikmusic's Joseph Viney chose the song as the best on the album, praising its "pounding drums, sweet vocal harmonies and a tale of love both won and lost with some alacrity."

In 2021, Parade ranked the song number eight on their list of the 25 greatest Adele songs, and in 2022, American Songwriter ranked the song number five on their list of the 10 greatest Adele songs.

== Chart performance ==
"Rumour Has It" has charted on various formats, including the Rock Songs chart peaking at number 28 and the Triple A chart, where it reached the top position for one week in August 2011. It also charted on the Billboard Hot 100 at number 96 for the week ending 3 August 2011. As of March 2012, "Rumour Has It" sold over 1,000,000 copies in the United States according to Nielsen SoundScan, and sold 500,000 copies before its single release. The track already has a history on the singles chart. "Rumour" reached No. 16 on the Hot 100 in December, fueled largely by the Glee cast's exposure of the song. The same week, the TV troupe bowed at No. 11 with its mash-up of the song and Adele's "Someone Like You".

== Live performances and cover versions ==
Adele added the song to the set list on her second worldwide tour Adele Live. She also performed the song during the 2011 iTunes Festival in London. American singer Jeremih covered the song during Billboard's Mashup Mondays. During an interview he said: "I know you probably haven't heard this type of sound from my voice, so I just wanted to touch it. And see what I could do with it. [...] The bridge is my favorite part. It showcased my vocals entirely, being so bare, just the keys and guitar. At first I was going to switch from keys to strings, but that was just too much." Jessica Letkemann of Billboard praised Jeremih's tenor and his "dusky-yet-feminine voice" saying that he was "centered on stripping the song's instrumentation down." During the cover, Jeremih made references to Vanilla Ice, David Bowie and Freddie Mercury.

Amber Riley, Naya Rivera and Heather Morris sang a mash-up of "Someone like You" and "Rumour Has It" during Glee's episode "Mash Off" which aired on 15 November 2011. However, the cover was posted online on 10 November. Jenna Mullins of E! Online praised the cover saying that it will "knock your socks right off" and a writer for OK! described it as "AMAZE-ing". Erica Futterman of Rolling Stone noted that the cover was "one of the greatest things the show has done [so far]." Similarly, Billboard's Raye Votta commented that the cover was "arguably the best performance 'Glee' has done since "Don't Stop Believin'"." Their version of the song peaked at number 11 on the Billboard Hot 100 while selling 160,000 digital downloads in its first week and became the fifth highest digital sales week by a Glee Cast single. As of March 2015, it remains the ninth best-selling Glee Cast recording in the show's history, having sold 413,000 copies in the United States. In Canada, the song debuted on the Canadian Hot 100 at number 12, selling 14,000 downloads. The mash-up also peaked at number 35 on the UK Singles Chart, number 28 in Australia and number 19 on the Irish Singles Chart.

The song was also covered by Katharine McPhee on the TV series "Smash", during the episode The Cost of Art. On the episode, after practicing her dance moves, McPhee's character Karen and her fellow "Marilyn" actors take the stage to rock out to the song. American emo band The Promise Ring performed a version of the song in September 2012 for The A.V. Club's A.V. Undercover series. The X Factor Indonesia winner Fatin Shidqia Lubis performed this song on Mentor's choice episode on 22 February 2013.

The alternative metal band Mushroomhead included a rendition of the song on their album The Righteous & the Butterfly.

The Voice Australia contestant Lexi Clark performed this song for the first live final of season 5 on 13 June 2016.

In 2017, Tedder's band, OneRepublic, covered the song on their 16th Annual Honda Civic Tour with Fitz and the Tantrums and James Arthur.

== Credits and personnel ==
- Adele – songwriter, backing vocals, lead vocals
- Ryan Tedder – songwriter, producer, electric guitar, piano, B-3 organ, drums, music programming, musical & string arrangements, recording engineer
- Jerrod "Skins" Bettis – drums, acoustic guitar
- Tom Elmhirst – audio mixing
- Dan Parry – audio mixing assistant, additional vocals

== Charts ==
=== Weekly charts ===
Chart (2011–2012)	Peak position
Australia (ARIA)	69
Austria (Ö3 Austria Top 40)	26
Belgium (Ultratop 50 Flanders)	46
Belgium (Ultratip Bubbling Under Wallonia)	7
Canada Hot 100 (Billboard)	16
Croatia International Airplay (HRT)	1
France (SNEP)	172
Germany (GfK)	68
Hungary (Rádiós Top 40)	36
Iceland (RÚV)	4
Ireland (IRMA)	71
Israel International Airplay (Media Forest)	7
Italy (FIMI)	23
Lebanon (Lebanese Top 20)	15
Mexico (Billboard Mexican Airplay)	31
Mexico Anglo (Monitor Latino)	6
Netherlands (Dutch Top 40)	21
Netherlands (Single Top 100)	52
Poland (Polish Airplay New)	1
Scottish Singles Sales (Official Charts)	71
South Korea International Chart (Gaon)	1
UK Singles (Official Charts)	85
US Billboard Hot 100	16
US Adult Contemporary (Billboard)	4
US Adult Pop Airplay (Billboard)	2
US Rock & Alternative Airplay (Billboard)	27
US Hot Rock & Alternative Songs (Billboard)	27
US Pop Airplay (Billboard)	8

Chart (2021)	Peak position
Sweden Heatseeker (Sverigetopplistan)	20

=== Year-end charts ===
Chart (2011)	Position
US Adult Alternative Airplay (Billboard)	14
Chart (2012)	Position
Canada (Canadian Hot 100)	59
US Billboard Hot 100	64
US Adult Contemporary (Billboard)	9
US Adult Top 40 (Billboard)	16
US Mainstream Top 40 (Billboard)	46
Chart (2013)	Position
US Adult Contemporary (Billboard)	25

== Certifications ==
Region	Certification	Certified units/sales
Australia (ARIA)	Gold	35,000^{^}
Brazil (Pro-Música Brasil)	Platinum	60,000^{‡}
Canada (Music Canada)	3× Platinum	240,000^{‡}
Denmark (IFPI Danmark)	Gold	45,000^{‡}
Italy (FIMI)	Gold	15,000^{*}
Mexico (AMPROFON)	Gold	30,000^{*}
New Zealand (RMNZ)	Platinum	30,000^{‡}
South Korea (Circle Chart)	—	53,317
United Kingdom (BPI)	Platinum	600,000^{‡}
United States (RIAA)	2× Platinum	2,000,000^{*}
^{*} Sales figures based on certification alone.^{^} Shipments figures based on certification alone.^{‡} Sales+streaming figures based on certification alone.

== Release history ==
Region	Date	Format
United Kingdom	5 November 2011	Mainstream radio
