= Glee: The Music, Volume 7 =

Soundtrack album by Glee Cast
- Released: December 6, 2011
- Label: Columbia / 20th Century Fox TV

Glee Cast chronology
Glee: The Music, The Christmas Album Volume 2 (2011)	Glee: The Music, Volume 7 (2011)	Glee: The Music, The Graduation Album (2012)

Glee: The Music, Volume 7 is the eleventh soundtrack album by the cast of the American musical television series Glee. It was released by Columbia Records on December 6, 2011.

== Background ==
The album was announced as being released in standard and deluxe versions, but only appeared in a standard edition that features fifteen tracks consisting of sixteen covers (one track is a mash-up of two songs by Adele). The version being sold at Target features five bonus tracks for a total of twenty, though it is not marketed as a deluxe edition.

== Reception ==
Professional ratings
Review scores
Source	Rating
AllMusic	3/5 stars

Heather Phares of AllMusic gave the album a rating of three stars out of a possible five, writing that the show's "music is as reliable as ever, a mix of traditional glee club favorites with some seemingly risky choices thrown in for good measure."

== Track listing ==
Unless otherwise indicated, Information for all the album editions are taken from their respective Liner Notes

No.	Title	Writer(s)	Original artist	Length
1.	"You Can't Stop the Beat" (featuring Lea Michele, Cory Monteith, Chris Colfer, Kevin McHale, Jenna Ushkowitz and Amber Riley)	Marc Shaiman, Scott Wittman	Hairspray	3:43
2.	"It's Not Unusual" (featuring Darren Criss)	Les Reed, Gordon Mills	Tom Jones	2:05
3.	"Somewhere" (Lea Michele featuring Idina Menzel)	Leonard Bernstein (Music); Stephen Sondheim (Lyrics)	Reri Grist from West Side Story	2:51
4.	"Run the World (Girls)" (featuring Heather Morris)	Terius Nash, Beyoncé Knowles, Wesley Pentz, David Taylor, Adidja Palmer, Nick van de Wall	Beyoncé	3:59
5.	"Fix You" (featuring Matthew Morrison)	Chris Martin, Jonny Buckland, Guy Berryman, Will Champion	Coldplay	4:35
6.	"Last Friday Night" (featuring Darren Criss)	Katy Perry, Lukasz Gottwald, Max Martin, Bonnie McKee	Katy Perry	3:48
7.	"Uptown Girl" (Grant Gustin and The Warblers)	Billy Joel	Billy Joel	3:01
8.	"Tonight" (featuring Lea Michele and Darren Criss)	Bernstein (Music); Sondheim (Lyrics)	Larry Kert and Carol Lawrence from West Side Story	2:51
9.	"Hot for Teacher" (featuring Darren Criss, Cory Monteith, Mark Salling and Harry Shum Jr.)	Eddie Van Halen, David Lee Roth, Alex Van Halen, Michael Anthony	Van Halen	4:46
10.	"Rumour Has It / Someone Like You" (featuring Amber Riley, Naya Rivera and Heather Morris)	Adele Adkins, Ryan Tedder / Adele Adkins, Dan Wilson	Adele	3:29
11.	"Girls Just Want to Have Fun" (featuring Cory Monteith and Kevin McHale)	Robert Hazard	Cyndi Lauper	2:42
12.	"Constant Craving" (Naya Rivera and Chris Colfer featuring Idina Menzel)	k.d. lang, Ben Mink	k.d. lang	4:38
13.	"ABC" (featuring Jenna Ushkowitz, Chris Colfer, Harry Shum Jr., Dianna Agron and Damian McGinty)	Berry Gordy, Freddie Perren, Deke Richards, Alphonso Mizell	The Jackson 5	2:54
14.	"Control" (featuring Dianna Agron, Darren Criss and Kevin McHale)	James Harris III, Terry Lewis, Janet Jackson	Janet Jackson	3:54
15.	"Man in the Mirror" (featuring Kevin McHale, Cory Monteith, Darren Criss, Harry Shum Jr. and Chord Overstreet)	Siedah Garrett, Glen Ballard	Michael Jackson	4:07

Target exclusive tracks/Japanese edition
No.	Title	Writer(s)	Original artist	Length
7.	"Take Care of Yourself" (bonus track) (featuring Damian McGinty)	Teddy Thompson	Teddy Thompson	3:13
8.	"Uptown Girl" (Grant Gustin and The Warblers)	Billy Joel	Billy Joel	3:01
9.	"Tonight" (featuring Lea Michele and Darren Criss)	Bernstein (Music); Sondheim (Lyrics)	Larry Kert and Carol Lawrence from West Side Story	2:51
10.	"Hot for Teacher" (featuring Darren Criss, Cory Monteith, Mark Salling and Harry Shum Jr.)	Eddie Van Halen, David Lee Roth, Alex Van Halen, Michael Anthony	Van Halen	4:46
11.	"Rumour Has It / Someone Like You" (featuring Amber Riley, Naya Rivera and Heather Morris)	Adele Adkins, Ryan Tedder / Adele Adkins, Dan Wilson	Adele	3:29
12.	"Perfect" (bonus track) (featuring Chris Colfer and Darren Criss)	Pink, Shellback, Max Martin	P!nk	3:30
13.	"I'm the Only One" (bonus track) (featuring Mark Salling)	Melissa Etheridge	Melissa Etheridge	4:25
14.	"Girls Just Want to Have Fun" (featuring Cory Monteith and Kevin McHale)	Robert Hazard	Cyndi Lauper	2:42
15.	"I Kissed a Girl" (bonus track) (featuring Naya Rivera and Lea Michele)	Katy Perry, Lukasz Gottwald, Max Martin, Cathy Dennis	Katy Perry	2:59
16.	"Constant Craving" (Naya Rivera and Chris Colfer featuring Idina Menzel)	k.d. lang, Ben Mink	k.d. lang	4:38
17.	"Red Solo Cup" (bonus track) (featuring Cory Monteith, Harry Shum Jr., Chord Overstreet and Dianna Agron)	Brett Beavers, Jim Beavers, Brad Warren, Brett Warren	Toby Keith	3:41
18.	"ABC" (featuring Jenna Ushkowitz, Chris Colfer, Harry Shum Jr., Dianna Agron and Damian McGinty)	Berry Gordy, Freddie Perren, Deke Richards, Alphonzo Mizell	The Jackson 5	2:54
19.	"Control" (featuring Dianna Agron, Darren Criss and Kevin McHale)	James Harris III, Terry Lewis, Janet Jackson	Janet Jackson	3:54
20.	"Man in the Mirror" (featuring Kevin McHale, Cory Monteith, Darren Criss, Chord Overstreet and Harry Shum Jr.)	Siedah Garrett, Glen Ballard	Michael Jackson	4:07

Notes

- While Jane Lynch and Jayma Mays are listed in the liner notes' Glee Cast Vocalists section, their vocals do not appear on this album.
- All of the Vocalists on the song "Uptown Girl" are members of a singing group known (on the show) as "The Warblers".

== Personnel ==
- Adele – composer
- Dianna Agron – cast, lead vocals
- Adam Anders – arranger, digital editing, producer, vocal arrangement, additional vocals
- Alex Anders – digital editing, vocal producer, additional vocals
- Nikki Anders – additional vocals
- Peer Åström – arranger, engineer, mixing, producer
- Brock Baker - background vocals (“Uptown Girl”)
- Kala Balch – additional vocals
- Glen Ballard – composer
- Emily Benford – additional vocals
- Leonard Bernstein – composer
- Dave Bett – creative director
- Joshua Blanchard – assistant engineer
- PJ Bloom – music supervisor
- Steve Bone – assistant engineer
- Anita Marisa Boriboon – art direction, design
- Ed Boyer – engineer, vocal arrangement
- Ben Bram – transcription, background vocals (“Uptown Girl”)
- Ravaughn Brown – additional vocals
- Geoff Bywater – executive in charge of music
- Alvin Chea – background vocals (“Uptown Girl”)
- Deyder Cintron – assistant engineer, digital editing, engineer
- Chris Colfer – cast, lead vocals
- Kamari Copeland – additional vocals
- Darren Criss – cast, lead vocals
- Tim Davis – vocal contractor, additional vocals
- Robert Dietz – editing, background vocals (“Uptown Girl”)
- Dante Di Loreto – soundtrack executive producer
- Luke Edgemon – background vocals (“Uptown Girl”)
- Brad Falchuk – soundtrack executive producer
- Tommy Faragher – mixing, producer, vocal arrangement
- Berry Gordy Jr. – composer
- Lukasz Gottwald – composer
- Heather Guibert – coordination
- Grant Gustin – lead vocals, background vocals (“Uptown Girl”)
- Jon Hall – background vocals (“Uptown Girl”)
- James Harris III – composer
- Robert Hazard – composer
- Fredrik Jansson – assistant engineer
- Billy Joel – composer
- Beyoncé Knowles – composer
- k.d. lang – composer
- Storm Lee – additional vocals
- David Loucks – additional vocals
- Jane Lynch – cast, vocals
- Meaghan Lyons – coordination
- Dominick Maita – mastering
- Chris Martin – composer
- Eddie Martin – background vocals (“Uptown Girl”)
- Jayma Mays – cast, vocals
- Damian McGinty – cast, lead vocals
- Kevin McHale – cast, lead vocals
- Curt Mega – background vocals (“Uptown Girl”)
- Idina Menzel - guest vocals, lead vocals
- Lea Michele – cast, lead vocals
- Gordon Mills – composer
- Alphonzo Mizell – composer
- Cory Monteith – cast, lead vocals
- Heather Morris – cast, lead vocals
- Matthew Morrison – cast, lead vocals
- Ryan Murphy – producer
- Jeanette Olsson – additional vocals
- Chord Overstreet – cast, lead vocals
- Adidja Palmer – composer
- John Paterno – engineer, mixing
- Freddie Perren – composer
- Katy Perry – composer
- Martin Persson – programming
- Zac Poor – additional vocals
- Jemain Purifoy – background vocals (“Uptown Girl”)
- Nicole Ray – production coordination
- Deke Richards – composer
- Amber Riley – cast, lead vocals
- Naya Rivera – cast, lead vocals
- David Lee Roth – composer
- Mark Salling – cast, lead vocals
- Drew Ryan Scott – additional vocals
- Onitsha Shaw – additional vocals
- Harry Shum Jr. – cast, lead vocals
- Jenny Sinclair – coordination
- Scott Smith – assistant engineer
- Stephen Sondheim – composer, lyricist
- Jenna Ushkowitz – cast, lead vocals
- Alex Van Halen – composer
- Eddie Van Halen – composer
- Windy Wagner – additional vocals
- Trevor Wesley – background vocals (“Uptown Girl”)
- Dan Wilson – composer
- Joe Wohlmuth – engineer

Unless otherwise indicated, Information is taken from Allmusic

== Charts ==
Chart performance for Glee: The Music, Volume 7
Chart (2011–2012)	Peak position
Australian Albums (ARIA)	18
Dutch Albums (Album Top 100)	47
Irish Albums (IRMA)	41
Mexican Albums (AMPROFON)	58
New Zealand Albums (RMNZ)	25
UK Albums (OCC)	55
US Billboard 200	9
US Soundtrack Albums (Billboard)	1
