= List of songs in Glee season 5 =

Glee is an American musical comedy-drama television series produced by Fox. It focuses on the glee club New Directions, at the fictional William McKinley High School in Lima, Ohio. The show was created by Ryan Murphy, Brad Falchuk and Ian Brennan, and features many cover versions of songs sung on-screen by the characters. Murphy is responsible for selecting all of the songs used, and strives to maintain a balance between show tunes and chart hits, as he wants there to be "something for everybody in every episode." Once Murphy selects a song, rights are cleared with its publishers by music supervisor P.J. Bloom, and music producer Adam Anders arranges it for the Glee cast. Numbers are pre-recorded by the cast, while the show's choreographers (Zach Woodlee in previous seasons; Brooke Lipton and Mandy Moore in season 5) construct the accompanying dance moves, which are then taught to the cast and filmed. Studio recordings of tracks is then made. The process begins six to eight weeks before each episode is filmed, and can end as late as the day before filming begins. The list below contains all 119 musical performances of the fifth season, with each performance delivering an individual song or a mashup of two or more songs in a single performance.

== Songs ==
List of songs in Glee season five
Title	Version covered	Performed by	Episode	Single	Album	Ref.
"Yesterday"	The Beatles	Rachel Berry	1. "Love, Love, Love"	Yes	Sings the Beatles	
"Drive My Car"	The Beatles	Artie Abrams and Kitty Wilde with New Directions	1. "Love, Love, Love"	Yes	Sings the Beatles	
"Got to Get You into My Life"	Earth, Wind & Fire	Kurt Hummel and Blaine Anderson with the McKinley High marching band	1. "Love, Love, Love"	Yes	Sings the Beatles	
"You've Got to Hide Your Love Away"	The Silkie	Artie Abrams and Kitty Wilde	1. "Love, Love, Love"	Yes	Sings the Beatles	
"Help!"	The Beatles	Blaine Anderson and Sam Evans with New Directions, Vocal Adrenaline, Haverbrook School for the Deaf and Dalton Academy Warblers	1. "Love, Love, Love"	Yes	Sings the Beatles	
"A Hard Day's Night"	The Beatles	Rachel Berry and Santana Lopez with Spotlight Diner co-workers	1. "Love, Love, Love"	Yes	Sings the Beatles	
"I Saw Her Standing There"	The Beatles	New Directions Males except Artie Abrams	1. "Love, Love, Love"	Yes	Sings the Beatles	
"All You Need Is Love/She Loves You"	The Beatles	Blaine Anderson with New Directions, Dalton Academy Warblers, Vocal Adrenaline, Haverbrook School for the Deaf, Rachel Berry, Burt Hummel, Mercedes Jones, Santana Lopez and Will Schuester	1. "Love, Love, Love"	Yes	Sings the Beatles	
"Revolution"	The Beatles	Tina Cohen-Chang	2. "Tina in the Sky with Diamonds"	No	N/A	
"Get Back"	Billy Preston	Kurt Hummel and Rachel Berry with NYADA students	2. "Tina in the Sky with Diamonds"	Yes	Sings the Beatles	
"Something"	The Beatles	Sam Evans with Ryder Lynn and Jake Puckerman	2. "Tina in the Sky with Diamonds"	Yes	Sings the Beatles	
"Here Comes the Sun"	The Beatles	Dani and Santana Lopez	2. "Tina in the Sky with Diamonds"	Yes	Sings the Beatles	
"Sgt. Pepper's Lonely Hearts Club Band"	Paul McCartney & U2	Jake Puckerman, Ryder Lynn, Unique Adams and Marley Rose	2. "Tina in the Sky with Diamonds"	Yes	Sings the Beatles	
"Hey Jude"	The Beatles	Blaine Anderson, Kitty Wilde, Tina Cohen-Chang and Sam Evans with New Directions	2. "Tina in the Sky with Diamonds"	Yes	Sings the Beatles	
"Let It Be"	The Beatles	Rachel Berry, Santana Lopez, Kurt Hummel and New Directions	2. "Tina in the Sky with Diamonds"	Yes	Sings the Beatles	
"Seasons of Love"	Rent	Mercedes Jones, Santana Lopez, Kurt Hummel, Noah Puckerman, Mike Chang, Tina Cohen-Chang and New Directions	3. "The Quarterback"	Yes	The Quarterback	
"I'll Stand by You"	The Pretenders	Mercedes Jones with New Directions	3. "The Quarterback"	Yes	The Quarterback	
"Fire and Rain"	James Taylor	Artie Abrams and Sam Evans with New Directions	3. "The Quarterback"	Yes	The Quarterback	
"If I Die Young"	The Band Perry	Santana Lopez with New Directions	3. "The Quarterback"	Yes	The Quarterback	
"No Surrender"	Bruce Springsteen	Noah Puckerman	3. "The Quarterback"	Yes	The Quarterback	
"Make You Feel My Love"	Adele	Rachel Berry	3. "The Quarterback"	Yes	The Quarterback	
"Marry the Night"	Lady Gaga	Elliott "Starchild" Gilbert	4. "A Katy or a Gaga"	Yes	A Katy or a Gaga	
"Applause"	Lady Gaga	Sam Evans, Blaine Anderson, Artie Abrams, Ryder Lynn and Marley Rose	4. "A Katy or a Gaga"	Yes	A Katy or a Gaga	
"Wide Awake"	Katy Perry	Jake Puckerman, Tina Cohen-Chang, Kitty Wilde and Unique Adams	4. "A Katy or a Gaga"	Yes	A Katy or a Gaga	
"Roar"	Katy Perry	Tina Cohen-Chang, Unique Adams, Kitty Wilde, Sam Evans, Rachel Berry, Elliott "Starchild" Gilbert, Dani and Santana Lopez with New Directions and Kurt Hummel	4. "A Katy or a Gaga"	Yes	A Katy or a Gaga	
"You Are Woman, I Am Man"	Funny Girl; Barbra Streisand and Sydney Chaplin	Paolo San Pablo and Rachel Berry	5. "The End of Twerk"	Yes	TBA	
"Blurred Lines"	Robin Thicke feat. T.I. and Pharrell	Will Schuester, Artie Abrams, Jake Puckerman and Bree with New Directions and McKinley High students	5. "The End of Twerk"	Yes	TBA	
"If I Were a Boy"	Beyoncé	Unique Adams	5. "The End of Twerk"	Yes	TBA	
"Wrecking Ball"	Miley Cyrus	Marley Rose	5. "The End of Twerk"	Yes	TBA	
"On Our Way"	The Royal Concept	New Directions	5. "The End of Twerk"	Yes	TBA	
"Movin' Out (Anthony's Song)"	Billy Joel	Blaine Anderson and Sam Evans with New Directions	6. "Movin' Out"	Yes	Movin' Out	
"Piano Man"	Billy Joel	Blaine Anderson with Spotlight Diner patrons and employees	6. "Movin' Out"	Yes	Movin' Out	
"My Life"	Billy Joel	Jake Puckerman with New Directions females and the McKinley High Cheerios	6. "Movin' Out"	Yes	Movin' Out	
"Honesty"	Billy Joel	Artie Abrams	6. "Movin' Out"	Yes	Movin' Out	
"An Innocent Man"	Billy Joel	Ryder Lynn	6. "Movin' Out"	Yes	Movin' Out	
"Just the Way You Are"	Billy Joel	Kurt Hummel, Blaine Anderson, Rachel Berry, Sam Evans and Santana Lopez	6. "Movin' Out"	Yes	Movin' Out	
"You May Be Right"	Billy Joel	Will Schuester, Artie Abrams, Kitty Wilde, Ryder Lynn and Jake Puckerman with New Directions and McKinley High students	6. "Movin' Out"	Yes	Movin' Out	
"Into the Groove"	Madonna	Pamela Lansbury	7. "Puppet Master"	Yes	TBA	
"You're My Best Friend"	Queen	Blaine Anderson with New Directions puppets	7. "Puppet Master"	Yes	TBA	
"Nasty" / "Rhythm Nation"	Janet Jackson	Jake Puckerman, Marley Rose and Bree with the McKinley High Cheerios	7. "Puppet Master"	Yes	TBA	
"Cheek to Cheek"	Fred Astaire	Will Schuester and Sue Sylvester	7. "Puppet Master"	Yes	TBA	
"The Fox (What Does the Fox Say?)"	Ylvis	New Directions and Pamela Lansbury	7. "Puppet Master"	Yes	TBA	
"Here Comes Santa Claus"	Gene Autry	Kurt Hummel, Santana Lopez and Rachel Berry with mall elves	8. "Previously Unaired Christmas"	Yes	The Christmas Album Volume 4	
"Rockin' Around the Christmas Tree"	Brenda Lee	Artie Abrams, Will Schuester, Jake Puckerman, Kitty Wilde and Marley Rose with New Directions	8. "Previously Unaired Christmas"	Yes	The Christmas Album Volume 4	
"Mary's Boy Child"	Boney M.	Marley Rose, Unique Adams and Tina Cohen-Chang	8. "Previously Unaired Christmas"	Yes	The Christmas Album Volume 4	
"The Chipmunk Song (Christmas Don't Be Late)"	Alvin and the Chipmunks	Rachel Berry, Kurt Hummel and Santana Lopez with Cody Tolentino	8. "Previously Unaired Christmas"	Yes	The Christmas Album Volume 4	
"Love Child"	Diana Ross & the Supremes	Unique Adams with Tina Cohen-Chang, Marley Rose and New Directions except Kitty Wilde	8. "Previously Unaired Christmas"	Yes	The Christmas Album Volume 4	
"Away in a Manger"	Traditional	Santana Lopez, Rachel Berry, Kurt Hummel and Kitty Wilde with New Directions	8. "Previously Unaired Christmas"	Yes	The Christmas Album Volume 4	
"Whenever I Call You Friend"	Kenny Loggins and Stevie Nicks	Artie Abrams and Tina Cohen-Chang with New Directions	9. "Frenemies"	Yes	TBA	
"Brave"	Sara Bareilles	Santana Lopez and Rachel Berry	9. "Frenemies"	Yes	TBA	
"My Lovin' (You're Never Gonna Get It)"	En Vogue	Artie Abrams and Tina Cohen-Chang with New Directions and Will Schuester	9. "Frenemies"	Yes	TBA	
"Beautiful Dreamer"	Stephen Foster	Funny Girl understudy auditionee	9. "Frenemies"	No	TBA	
"Don't Rain on My Parade"	Funny Girl	Santana Lopez	9. "Frenemies"	Yes	TBA	
"I Believe in a Thing Called Love"	The Darkness	Elliott "Starchild" Gilbert and Kurt Hummel	9. "Frenemies"	Yes	TBA	
"Every Breath You Take"	The Police	Rachel Berry and Santana Lopez	9. "Frenemies"	Yes	TBA	
"Breakaway"	Kelly Clarkson	Tina Cohen-Chang, Artie Abrams, and Blaine Anderson with New Directions	9. "Frenemies"	Yes	TBA	
"Jumpin', Jumpin'"	Destiny's Child	Tina Cohen-Chang, Blaine Anderson and Sam Evans	10. "Trio"	Yes	TBA	
"Barracuda"	Heart	Elliott "Starchild" Gilbert and Rachel Berry	10. "Trio"	Yes	TBA	
"Don't You (Forget About Me)"	Simple Minds	Sam Evans, Blaine Anderson and Tina Cohen-Chang	10. "Trio"	Yes	TBA	
"Danny's Song"	Loggins and Messina	Will Schuester and Emma Pillsbury	10. "Trio"	Yes	TBA	
"Gloria"	Laura Branigan	Santana Lopez, Elliott "Starchild" Gilbert and Rachel Berry	10. "Trio"	Yes	TBA	
"The Happening"	The Supremes	Kurt Hummel, Dani and Elliott "Starchild" Gilbert	10. "Trio"	Yes	TBA	
"Hold On"	Wilson Phillips	Tina Cohen-Chang, Blaine Anderson, Artie Abrams, Sam Evans, Kurt Hummel, Elliott "Starchild" Gilbert, Rachel Berry, Santana Lopez and Dani	10. "Trio"	Yes	TBA	
"I Love L.A."	Randy Newman	Will Schuester, Blaine Anderson, Artie Abrams, Sam Evans and Jake Puckerman with New Directions	11. "City of Angels"	Yes	City of Angels	
"Vacation"	The Go-Go's	The Amazonians	11. "City of Angels"	Yes	City of Angels	
"Mr. Roboto" / "Counting Stars"	Styx / OneRepublic	Jean-Baptiste and Throat Explosion	11. "City of Angels"	Yes	City of Angels	
"More Than a Feeling"	Boston	Blaine Anderson and Tina Cohen-Chang with New Directions	11. "City of Angels"	Yes	City of Angels	
"America"	Neil Diamond	Artie Abrams, Sam Evans, Kitty Wilde, and Unique Adams with New Directions	11. "City of Angels"	Yes	City of Angels	
"I Still Haven't Found What I'm Looking For"	U2	Sam Evans, Blaine Anderson, Artie Abrams and Tina Cohen-Chang with New Directions	11. "City of Angels"	Yes	City of Angels	
"Raise Your Glass"	Pink	April Rhodes and Will Schuester with original and current New Directions members	12. "100"	Yes	Celebrating 100 Episodes	
"Toxic"	Britney Spears	Quinn Fabray, Santana Lopez and Brittany Pierce	12. "100"	Yes	Celebrating 100 Episodes	
"Defying Gravity"	Wicked	Mercedes Jones, Kurt Hummel and Rachel Berry	12. "100"	Yes	Celebrating 100 Episodes	
"Valerie"	Mark Ronson feat. Amy Winehouse	Santana Lopez and Brittany Pierce	12. "100"	Yes	Celebrating 100 Episodes	
"Keep Holding On"	Avril Lavigne	Noah Puckerman with original and current New Directions members	12. "100"	Yes	Celebrating 100 Episodes	
"Happy"	Pharrell Williams	Holly Holliday, April Rhodes, Will Schuester, Blaine Anderson and Mercedes Jones with original and current New Directions members	12. "100"	Yes	Celebrating 100 Episodes	
"I Am Changing"	Dreamgirls	Kurt Hummel and Mercedes Jones	13. "New Directions"	Yes	Celebrating 100 Episodes	
"Party All the Time"	Eddie Murphy	Holly Holliday with current and former McKinley High students and Will Schuester	13. "New Directions"	Yes	Celebrating 100 Episodes	
"Loser like Me (Acoustic)"	Original composition	Blaine Anderson, Sam Evans, Tina Cohen-Chang and Artie Abrams	13. "New Directions"	Yes	Celebrating 100 Episodes	
"Be Okay"	Oh Honey	Rachel Berry and Santana Lopez	13. "New Directions"	Yes	Celebrating 100 Episodes	
"Just Give Me a Reason"	Pink feat. Nate Ruess	Quinn Fabray and Noah Puckerman	13. "New Directions"	Yes	Celebrating 100 Episodes	
"Don't Stop Believin'"	Journey	Rachel Berry, Blaine Anderson, Artie Abrams, Tina Cohen-Chang, Kurt Hummel, and Will Schuester with New Directions	13. "New Directions"	Yes	Celebrating 100 Episodes	
"Downtown"	Petula Clark	Rachel Berry, Kurt Hummel, Blaine Anderson, Artie Abrams and Sam Evans	14. "New New York"	Yes	New New York	
"You Make Me Feel So Young"	Frank Sinatra	Blaine Anderson and Kurt Hummel	14. "New New York"	Yes	New New York	
"Best Day of My Life"	American Authors	Blaine Anderson and Sam Evans with Beat Club Crew dancers	14. "New New York"	Yes	New New York	
"Rockstar"	A Great Big World	Elliott "Starchild" Gilbert and Kurt Hummel	14. "New New York"	Yes	New New York	
"Don't Sleep in the Subway"	Petula Clark	Rachel Berry and Artie Abrams with subway riders	14. "New New York"	Yes	New New York	
"People"	Funny Girl	Rachel Berry	14. "New New York"	Yes	New New York	
"No One Is Alone"	Into the Woods	Rachel Berry, Kurt Hummel and Blaine Anderson	15. "Bash"	Yes	Bash	
"(You Make Me Feel Like) A Natural Woman"	Aretha Franklin	Mercedes Jones	15. "Bash"	Yes	Bash	
"Broadway Baby"	Follies	Rachel Berry and Blaine Anderson	15. "Bash"	Yes	Bash	
"Not While I'm Around"	Sweeney Todd: The Demon Barber of Fleet Street	Blaine Anderson, Rachel Berry, Mercedes Jones, and Sam Evans	15. "Bash"	Yes	Bash	
"Colorblind"	Amber Riley	Mercedes Jones	15. "Bash"	Yes	Bash	
"I'm Still Here"	Follies	Kurt Hummel	15. "Bash"	Yes	Bash	
"Addicted to Love"	Robert Palmer	Artie Abrams with Jessica, Julie, Vanessa and female admirers	16. "Tested"	Yes	Tested	
"I Want to Know What Love Is"	Foreigner	Mercedes Jones with church choir	16. "Tested"	Yes	Tested	
"Love Is a Battlefield"	Pat Benatar	Blaine Anderson and Kurt Hummel	16. "Tested"	Yes	Tested	
"Let's Wait Awhile"	Janet Jackson	Mercedes Jones and Artie Abrams with Sam Evans	16. "Tested"	Yes	Tested	
"Lovefool"	The Cardigans	Rachel Berry with Blaine Anderson, Tina Cohen-Chang, Sam Evans, Kurt Hummel and Santana Lopez	17. "Opening Night"	Yes	Opening Night	
"N.Y.C."	Annie	Sue Sylvester and Will Schuester	17. "Opening Night"	Yes	Opening Night	
"I'm the Greatest Star"	Funny Girl	Rachel Berry	17. "Opening Night"	Yes	Opening Night	
"Who Are You Now?"	Funny Girl	Rachel Berry and Sue Sylvester	17. "Opening Night"	Yes	Opening Night	
"Pumpin Blood"	NONONO	Rachel Berry with Mercedes Jones and Santana Lopez	17. "Opening Night"	Yes	Opening Night	
"Wake Me Up"	Avicii feat. Aloe Blacc	Rachel Berry	18. "Back-up Plan"	Yes	The Back-Up Plan	
"Doo Wop (That Thing)"	Lauryn Hill	Mercedes Jones and Santana Lopez	18. "Back-up Plan"	Yes	The Back-Up Plan	
"Story of My Life"	One Direction	Kurt Hummel and Blaine Anderson	18. "Back-up Plan"	Yes	The Back-Up Plan	
"Piece of My Heart"	Big Brother and the Holding Company	June Dolloway and Blaine Anderson	18. "Back-up Plan"	Yes	The Back-Up Plan	
"The Rose"	Bette Midler	Rachel Berry	18. "Back-up Plan"	Yes	The Back-Up Plan	
"I Melt with You"	Modern English	Sam Evans, Rachel Berry and Mercedes Jones with Artie Abrams	19. "Old Dog, New Tricks"	Yes	Old Dog, New Tricks	
"Memory"	Cats	Kurt Hummel and Maggie Banks with Lexington Home retirees	19. "Old Dog, New Tricks"	Yes	Old Dog, New Tricks	
"Werewolves of London"	Warren Zevon	Sam Evans and Artie Abrams	19. "Old Dog, New Tricks"	Yes	Old Dog, New Tricks	
"Lucky Star"	Madonna	Kurt Hummel and Maggie Banks with Lexington Home retirees	19. "Old Dog, New Tricks"	Yes	Old Dog, New Tricks	
"Take Me Home Tonight"	Eddie Money	Artie Abrams, Blaine Anderson, Maggie Banks, Rachel Berry, Sam Evans, Kurt Hummel, Mercedes Jones and Santana Lopez with Lexington Home retirees	19. "Old Dog, New Tricks"	Yes	Old Dog, New Tricks	
"Shakin' My Head"	Original composition	Mercedes Jones with Brittany Pierce and backup dancers	20. "The Untitled Rachel Berry Project"	Yes	The Untitled Rachel Berry Project	
"All of Me"	John Legend	Blaine Anderson	20. "The Untitled Rachel Berry Project"	Yes	The Untitled Rachel Berry Project	
"Girls on Film"	Duran Duran	Sam Evans with Charlie Darlene and female models	20. "The Untitled Rachel Berry Project"	Yes	The Untitled Rachel Berry Project	
"Glitter in the Air"	Pink	Rachel Berry	20. "The Untitled Rachel Berry Project"	Yes	The Untitled Rachel Berry Project''	
"No Time at All"	Pippin	June Dolloway and Blaine Anderson with concert audience	20. "The Untitled Rachel Berry Project"	Yes	The Untitled Rachel Berry Project	
"American Boy"	Estelle feat. Kanye West	Blaine Anderson and Kurt Hummel	20. "The Untitled Rachel Berry Project"	Yes	The Untitled Rachel Berry Project	
"Pompeii"	Bastille	Rachel Berry, Kurt Hummel, Mercedes Jones, Blaine Anderson, Sam Evans, Artie Abrams, and Brittany Pierce with New York citizens	20. "The Untitled Rachel Berry Project"	Yes	The Untitled Rachel Berry Project	

== See also ==
- List of songs in Glee (season 1)
- List of songs in Glee (season 2)
- List of songs in Glee (season 3)
- List of songs in Glee (season 4)
- List of songs in Glee (season 6)
- Glee albums discography
