= A Katy or a Gaga =

- Glee episode
- Episode no.: Season 5 Episode 4
- Directed by: Ian Brennan
- Written by: Russel Friend; Garrett Lerner
- Production code: 5ARC04
- Original air date: November 7, 2013

Guest appearances
- Demi Lovato as Dani; Adam Lambert as Elliott "Starchild" Gilbert; Lauren Potter as Becky Jackson; Erinn Westbrook as Bree; Phoebe Strole as Penny Owen

Episode chronology
| ← Previous "The Quarterback" | Next → "The End of Twerk" |
- Glee season 5

"A Katy or a Gaga" is the fourth episode of the fifth season of the American musical television series Glee, and the ninety-second episode overall. It was written by executive producers Russel Friend & Garrett Lerner, and directed by co-creator Ian Brennan, and it aired on Fox in the United States on November 7, 2013. The episode features the music of Katy Perry and Lady Gaga, the debut of guest star Adam Lambert as Elliott "Starchild" Gilbert, and the return of special guest star Demi Lovato as Dani, Santana's (Naya Rivera) girlfriend.

In this episode, the glee club is challenged to perform music from either Katy Perry or Lady Gaga, whichever performer they have the least affinity for, to stretch their boundaries. Kurt decides to form a band, and is resistant to the idea that he should include Starchild in it following a highly flamboyant yet excellent audition.

The episode was watched by 4.01 million viewers, and received mixed reviews from critics.

== Plot ==
This episode starts when Glee club director Will Schuester (Matthew Morrison) announces that the main competition in Nationals is Throat Explosion, and divides the glee club between those who identify themselves with Katy Perry and those who identity themselves with Lady Gaga. He then instructs each group to perform a song from the other group's inspiration, in order to strengthen their weak points.

In New York, Kurt Hummel (Chris Colfer) recruits Santana Lopez (Naya Rivera) and Dani (Demi Lovato) to his band, and schedules auditions at NYADA. The only applicant is Elliott Gilbert (Adam Lambert), an overtly bold performer who calls himself "Starchild" and impresses Santana and Dani with a rendition of "Marry the Night", but is rejected by Kurt, who fears Starchild might be too edgy for what he hopes is a mainstream band. Rachel Berry (Lea Michele) later tells Kurt he shouldn't change his artistic views to adapt to expectations, and Kurt reconsiders his decision and invites Starchild to join the band. Kurt also convinces a reluctant Rachel to join the band, which she names "Pamela Lansbury", a portmanteau of Pamela Anderson and Angela Lansbury.

In Lima, Sam Evans (Chord Overstreet) is surprised to find out that Penny Owen (Phoebe Strole) has an unlikely appreciation for bad boys, and takes over the Gaga assignment in hopes of showing her a different side of himself. Meanwhile, Jake Puckerman (Jacob Artist) becomes frustrated with his relationship with Marley Rose (Melissa Benoist). Bree (Erinn Westbrook) invites him to help her choreograph a dance routine for the Cheerios, and Wade "Unique" Adams (Alex Newell) becomes concerned Jake might become attracted to her. Marley refuses to change for Jake and joins Sam, Artie Abrams (Kevin McHale), Blaine Anderson (Darren Criss) and Ryder Lynn (Blake Jenner) for a performance of "Applause" dressed as Katy Perry. The number turns out disappointing, and Will suspends Marley from glee club for a week for breaking the rules of the assignment.

Penny confesses to Sam that she doesn't really like bad boys, and only dates them to prove to herself that she is not a boring person, but she likes Carrie Underwood, Bruno Mars and Katy Perry. Sam confesses he has similar interests and they kiss, and he takes her to the auditorium to watch Jake, Unique, Kitty Wilde (Becca Tobin) and Tina Cohen-Chang (Jenna Ushkowitz) perform a stripped-down version of "Wide Awake". Jake later convinces Marley to dress up like Katy Perry for him, but they get into a fight when Marley claims she is not yet ready to have sex with him. The following day, Jake seduces Bree and they have sex on the school grounds. Bree also informs Principal Sue Sylvester (Jane Lynch) of the assignment, and Sue suspends the entire glee club for a week for dressing inappropriately on school grounds. Will refuses to back down to Sue despite her new position, and New Directions later meets at the auditorium, where they defiantly perform "Roar", a song also performed by Pamela Lansbury, now with its full complement of performers, and the episode ends.

== Production ==
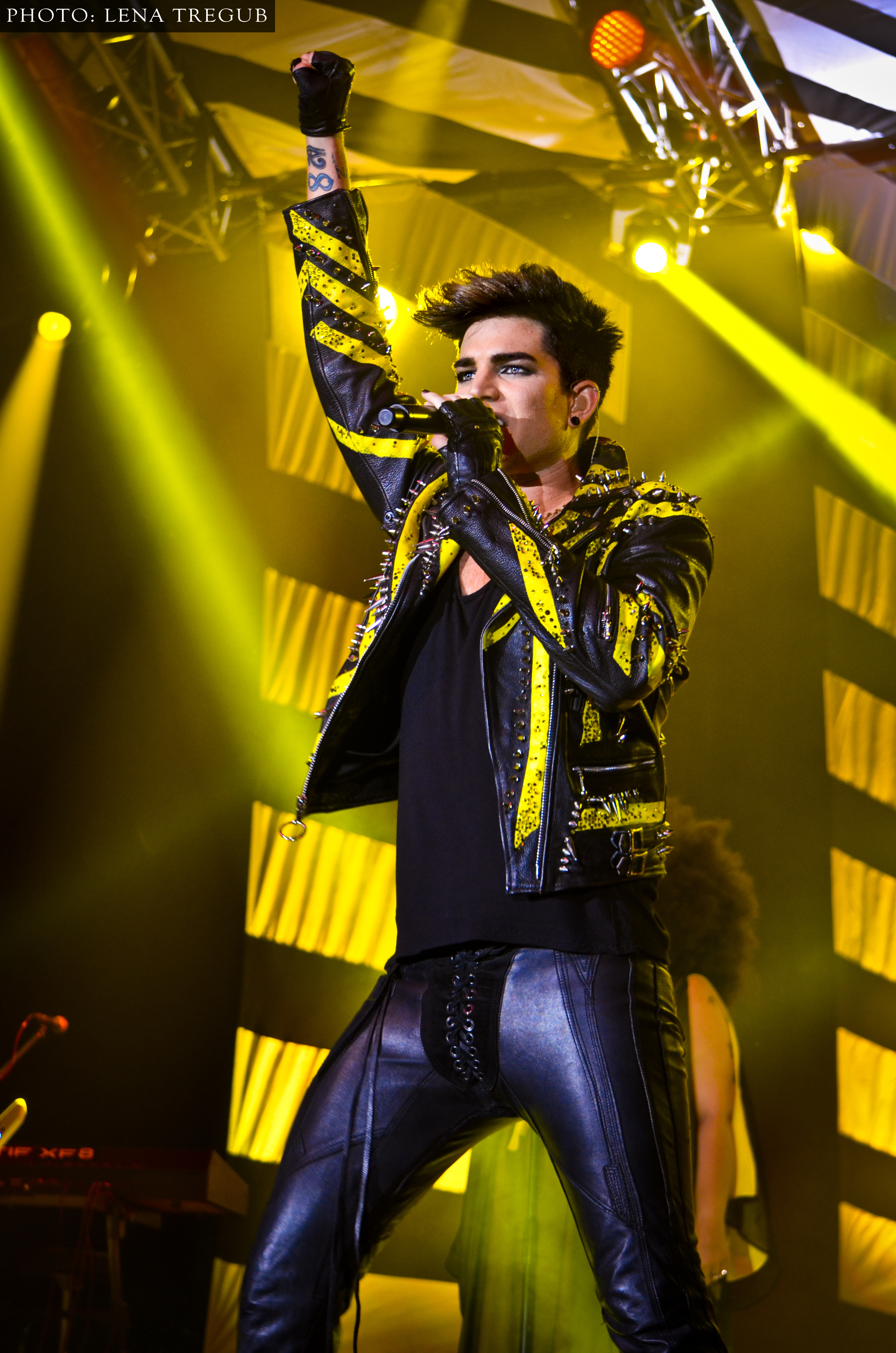
This episode marks the first appearance of Adam Lambert as Elliott "Starchild" Gilbert

Shooting for the episode began by September 23, 2013, after a hiatus following the completion of the previous episode "The Quarterback", which dealt with the death of character Finn Hudson. Cast members began recording songs and rehearsing dance numbers for the episode in the middle of the preceding week.

Adam Lambert debuts in this episode in the recurring role of Elliott "Starchild" Gilbert. According to Chris Colfer, who plays Kurt, Lambert's character will be Kurt's nemesis. Late on September 26, Lea Michele tweeted a photo from the set featuring herself, Lambert, Colfer, Naya Rivera and Demi Lovato singing in front of a band.

Special guest star Lovato returns as Dani, Santana's fellow waitress and girlfriend. Other recurring characters in this episode include cheerleaders Becky Jackson (Lauren Potter) and Bree (Erinn Westbrook), and McKinley nurse Penny Owen (Phoebe Strole).

Co-creator Ryan Murphy stated that the episode would have many "great costumes" and "great set pieces". Four songs from the episode are being released: Katy Perry's "Roar", featuring singers including Lovato and Lambert, and "Wide Awake"; and Lady Gaga's "Applause" and "Marry the Night", the latter featuring Lambert. Media reports in mid-September incorrectly stated that Lambert would be performing "Applause"; Lady Gaga tweeted that Lambert was "perfect for the song cause he's glammer".

== Reception ==
=== Ratings ===
The episode was watched by 4.01 million American viewers and received an 18-49 rating/share of 1.5/4, placing third in its timeslot and ninth for the night.

=== Critical reception ===
The episode received mixed reviews from critics, though most critics praised Adam Lambert's performance. Miranda Wicker of TV Fanatic gave the episode a 3 out of 5, signifying moderate reviews, saying the return of the series post-Cory Monteith "was sure to be a bumpy one. The right amount of pathos needed to be balanced with a healthy dose of moving forward." She then commented positively on Adam Lambert's role as Starchild, saying "Anything that gets more Adam Lambert on my screen is okay by me." MaryAnn Sleasman of TV.com also gave the episode a moderate review, saying "Despite being "the most annoying thing they've ever done" (IDK, Sue, I bet if we really thought about it, we could come up with something way more annoying), "A Katy or a Gaga" was a genuinely fun episode with a Glee PSA that wasn't completely lost in translation for once."

Katy Kroll of Rolling Stone gave Adam Lambert's performance of "Marry the Night" a positive review, saying "The scene is basically a four-minute music video for Lambert where he struts, pouts, poses and literally swings from a chandelier. Lady who?" Jocelyn Vena of MTV also gave the performance a positive review, saying "he blasts out like a real rock star. It includes him swinging from a chandelier in a top hat. It's an A+ performance that would make Gaga proud." Rae Votta of Billboard, though was not particularly positive of the episode, commented positively on Adam's audition, saying "He puts previous over the top audition numbers on the show to shame with air humping, table posturing, and literal swinging on chandeliers with no regard for structural integrity. Despite being a pretty straightforward interpretation, his "Marry The Night" trumps the other Gaga number of the episode, but this is also Adam Lambert and he could cover Gaga in his sleep."

Derek Chavis of The Baltimore Sun gave the episode a more negative review, saying "While it seems the productions of each number are getting bigger, the show’s spirit gets smaller. Does Ryan Murphy think that because American Horror Story is amazing he can slack off on Glee? I hope not. It was officially announced recently that Glee will end after next season (Season 6) so let’s end this show as great as we started it, shall we?" Lauren Hoffman of Vulture gave the episode a 2 out of 5, saying "The main problem with last night’s episode is that “Are you a Katy or a Gaga?” isn’t a particularly interesting question. I’m not even sure what that question is asking. Lady Gaga and Katy Perry certainly aren’t the same [...], but they’re not exactly polar opposites." Despite negative reviews of the episode's theme, she did comment positively on Adam Lambert's role, calling his audition "undeniably great."

== Music ==
An extended play of music from the episode, titled A Katy or a Gaga, sold 8,000 downloads in its first week of release. It peaked at number 43 on the Billboard 200 on November 23, 2013.
