= Previously Unaired Christmas =

- Glee episode
- Episode no.: Season 5 Episode 8
- Directed by: Wendey Stanzler
- Written by: Ross Maxwell
- Production code: 5ARC08
- Original air date: December 5, 2013

Guest appearances
- Dot-Marie Jones as Shannon Beiste; Lauren Potter as Becky Jackson; Bryce Johnson as Cody Tolentino; M. C. Gainey as the mall Santa

Episode chronology
← Previous "Puppet Master"	Next → "Frenemies"
- Glee season 5

"Previously Unaired Christmas" is the eighth episode and fall finale of the fifth season of the American musical television series Glee, and the ninety-sixth episode overall. It was directed by Wendey Stanzler and written by Ross Maxwell, and it aired on Fox in the United States on December 5, 2013. The episode is the show's fourth Christmas special, but due to season five being set in the same calendar year as season four, it is a non-canonical episode which purports to be the original season four Christmas special, suppressed by Fox.

Commentators reacted negatively to this episode, with many noting its inappropriate content. However, some critics commented positively on Naya Rivera's role as Santana Lopez. Upon airing, the episode was watched by 3.29 million viewers and received an 18-49 rating of 1.1, up from the previous episode, but down from last year's Christmas special. It is also the final Christmas-themed episode of the series.

== Plot ==
This very special Christmas edition starts when Jane Lynch addresses the audience to explain that the original 2012 Christmas episode of Glee was banned for being too offensive, but fan complaints have convinced Fox to air a severely edited version.

In 2012, glee club director Will Schuester (Matthew Morrison) selects Sam Evans (Chord Overstreet) and Tina Cohen-Chang (Jenna Ushkowitz) to create New Directions' entry for McKinley High's annual tree decorating contest, and Tina becomes obsessed with winning the grand prize, an angel sculpture. Later, football coach Shannon Beiste (Dot-Marie Jones) announces that the school's nativity scene has been defaced, and Principal Figgins (Iqbal Theba) has asked the Christmas Club, which all of New Directions is a part of, to participate in a living nativity. Tina, Marley Rose (Melissa Benoist) and Wade "Unique" Adams (Alex Newell) compete for the role of Virgin Mary, and invite Kitty Wilde (Becca Tobin) to audition with them, but she refuses.

In New York, Rachel Berry (Lea Michele) and Kurt Hummel (Chris Colfer) are visited by Santana Lopez (Naya Rivera), still recovering from her break-up with Brittany Pierce. Rachel gets a job as a Holiday elf at a shopping mall, and convinces Kurt and Santana to join her. However, the mall Santa (M. C. Gainey) turns up drunk and refuses to interact with the impatient crowd. After failing to stall them with a performance of "Here Comes Santa Claus", Rachel and Kurt convince Santana to dress up as Mrs. Claus and talk with the kids, but her excessive comments only upset the local parents and children.

In Lima, Sam and Tina run into Becky Jackson (Lauren Potter), who tries to use mistletoe to force them to kiss her. Cheerleading coach Sue Sylvester (Lynch) hears Tina criticizing how much she lets Becky get away with, and agrees that she's right. After sending Becky to the nurses office after lying to her that the mistletoe is poison sumac, Sue announces that she'll be judging the tree decorating contest and is planning on ranking the glee club last. Nevertheless, New Directions decorates their trees while singing "Rockin' Around the Christmas Tree", and Sue is forced to admit that they did a good job. The glee club then gathers in the auditorium, where Marley, Tina and Unique perform "Mary's Boy Child" for the role of Virgin Mary, and Marley notices Kitty's strange reaction to their performance.

Meanwhile, back in New York, Rachel, Kurt and Santana are approached by the drunk Santa's replacement, Cody Tolentino (Bryce Johnson), an attractive man who catches Kurt's attention. Cody convinces the trio to welcome him into the loft so they can bond ahead of their period together, and Cody conducts Rachel, Kurt and Santana in a more familiar drunken and helium-enhanced rendition of "Christmas Don't Be Late". When Rachel and Santana wake up the following day, they find Kurt bound and gagged and learn that Cody is a con artist who has robbed them.

Back in Lima, Will and Beiste announce the cast list for the living nativity, with Marley as Virgin Mary. Kitty scoffs at the decision, and when Marley questions her, Kitty admits she feels she's not worthy of playing Virgin Mary. Marley shares with the rest of the glee club that she feels Kitty deserves the role, and they come up with a scheme to convince her to do it. The next day, Will and Beiste invite Kitty to watch the rehearsals of their living nativity performance, in which Unique replaces Marley as Virgin Mary and performs a highly offensive rendition of "Love Child". Kitty is appalled and volunteers for the role, only to find out the performance was meant to push her into accepting it.

After Sue announces that the glee club has won the decorating contest, Sam and Tina notice that Becky is depressed about losing, especially after Sue criticizes her entry, and decide to give her the angel sculpture in order to cheer her up, in addition to offering her a role in the nativity scene portraying the baby Jesus

In New York, Rachel apologizes for what happened with Cody and announces she got the trio another gig as "living mannequins" in a clothing store. In Lima, New Directions and Becky gather to perform the living nativity before a group of children. Both sides sing "Away in a Manger", and the episode ends.

== Production ==
The episode was in production by November 2013, and included a long Saturday of filming on November 16, 2013.

Recurring characters in this episode include McKinley football coach Shannon Beiste (Dot-Marie Jones) and cheerleader Becky Jackson (Lauren Potter).

An extended play Christmas recording with six songs from the episode was released digitally on December 3, 2013, two days before the episode aired, and CDs will be sold at Walmart stores only starting December 10, 2013. Titled Glee: The Music, The Christmas Album Volume 4, the songs included are "Rockin' Around the Christmas Tree", performed by the glee club; Diana Ross & the Supremes' "Love Child", and "Mary's Little Boy Child", both performed by Alex Newell, Jenna Ushkowitz and Melissa Benoist; "The Chipmunk Song (Christmas Don't Be Late)" performed by Lea Michele, Chris Colfer, Naya Rivera plus a new character named Cody; "Here Comes Santa Claus (Right Down Santa Claus Lane)" sung by Michele, Colfer and Rivera; and "Away in a Manger" performed by New Directions featuring Tobin, Michele, Colfer and Rivera.

== Reception ==
=== Ratings ===
The episode was watched by 3.29 million American viewers, and received an 18-49 rating/share of 1.1/3. This presents an increase in ratings from the previous episode; however, it is down in ratings from the previous holiday special.

The show placed third in its timeslot and tenth for the night.

Including DVR viewing — which saw an additional 2.05 million viewers — the episode was watched by a total of 5.34 million viewers and received an 18-49 rating of 2.0

=== Critical reception ===
The episode was given generally negative reviews from critics. Jean Bentley of Zap2it gave the episode a mixed review, saying that the episode was used mainly as a way of attaining extra Christmas music sales. She did however comment positively on Santana's role, saying "it was worth sitting through the weirdness just to get Santana as an incredibly inappropriate Mrs. Claus. This is why we love her, and why we can't quit "Glee" no matter how infuriating the other parts are." Esther Gim of BuddyTV also gave the episode a mixed review, but was more negative in her analysis, saying "Despite it being fitting for the holiday season, the story that this episode had been locked away for the past year is weak. Why couldn't they just film an episode for this Christmas? Oh yeah, because it's still the last school year. I know, I know -- it's all supposed to be tongue and cheek [sic], and I should take it for what it is. It wasn't completely horrible. More like painful and entertaining at the same time."

Marc Snetiker of Entertainment Weekly gave the episode a negative review, saying "If you’ve defended the lovably crackers series through the years, I particularly encourage you not to bring up “Christmas Don’t Be Late,” in which Rachel, Kurt, and Santana inhale helium and channel Alvin and the Chipmunks in a truly horrifying display."

Daniel Sperling of Digital Spy also commented negatively on the episode, noting the episode's tendency to present offensive material, saying "Yes, it's deliberately over the top and annoying (we genuinely wanted to harm someone when Rachel, Kurt and Santana sucked helium to do The Chipmunks), there are explicit references to race and religion, plot holes are exposed and it blows raspberries in the face of those who call it insensitive by being wildly insensitive, but Glee's started to do that on an almost weekly basis now."
