= Tina in the Sky with Diamonds =

- Glee episode
- Episode no.: Season 5 Episode 2
- Directed by: Ian Brennan
- Written by: Ian Brennan
- Production code: 5ARC02
- Original air date: October 3, 2013

Guest appearances
- Demi Lovato as Dani; Peter Facinelli as Rupert Campion; Iqbal Theba as Principal Figgins; NeNe Leakes as Roz Washington; Erinn Westbrook as Bree; Phoebe Strole as Penny Owen; Christopher Curry as Gunther

Episode chronology
← Previous "Love, Love, Love"	Next → "The Quarterback"
- Glee season 5

"Tina in the Sky with Diamonds" is the second episode of the fifth season of the American musical television series Glee, and the ninetieth episode overall. The episode was written and directed by series co-creator Ian Brennan and first aired on October 3, 2013 on Fox in the United States. The episode is the second of two tribute episodes to the Beatles. It features the prom, Tina Cohen-Chang (Jenna Ushkowitz) runs for prom queen, the crush of Sam Evans (Chord Overstreet) on the new school nurse (Phoebe Strole), the new romance between Santana Lopez (Naya Rivera) and Dani (Demi Lovato), and a surprising news for Rachel Berry (Lea Michele) about Funny Girl. Special guest star Lovato makes her first appearance as Dani, a struggling artist in New York City, and Peter Facinelli returns as Rupert Campion, the Funny Girl director.

The episode received generally positive reviews by critics, with many of them saying the episode was better than the previous episode. Upon its initial airing, this episode was viewed by 4.42 million American viewers and garnered a 1.6/5 Nielsen rating/share in the 18–49 age group. The total viewership and ratings for this episode were down significantly from the previous week's season opener, "Love, Love, Love".

An album was released on September 24, 2013 to coincide with the season premiere, which features music from this episode and the episode "Love, Love, Love". The album, Glee Sings the Beatles, has received generally positive reviews from critics.

== Plot ==
New Directions continues their two-week assignment covering the Beatles. Tina Cohen-Chang (Jenna Ushkowitz) is nominated for prom queen at the new combined all-grades prom and is determined to win, dumping Sam Evans (Chord Overstreet)—who she had previously accepted as her prom date—to capitalize on the potential votes of girls without dates, and belittling her assistant and campaign manager, Dottie Kazatori (Pamela Chan). Although she is also nominated, Kitty Wilde (Becca Tobin) decides to support Tina. Upon learning of this, Bree (Erinn Westbrook) campaigns for Kitty, a fellow Cheerio, without her consent and ropes Dottie into a scheme to humiliate Tina at prom.

At NYADA, Kurt Hummel (Chris Colfer) performs "Get Back" to cheer up Rachel Berry (Lea Michele), who is depressed by her disappointing "chemistry" audition for Funny Girl. At the diner where Rachel and Santana Lopez (Naya Rivera) work, one of their co-workers, Dani (Demi Lovato), is interested in Santana; the interest is mutual, though scary for Santana, and Rachel gives her a pep talk before making herself scarce at the end of an overnight shift. Dani and Santana perform "Here Comes the Sun" and, after walking through the city, they share a kiss.

Principal Sue Sylvester (Jane Lynch) hires college student Penny Owen (Phoebe Strole) to become McKinley High's nurse, and Sam develops a crush on her, singing "Something". When Sue decides to fire Penny for incompetence, Sam overcomes his fear of needles and allows Penny to give him a meningitis shot, and later praises her to Sue, who reverses her decision.

At prom, Ryder Lynn (Blake Jenner), Marley Rose (Melissa Benoist), Jake Puckerman (Jacob Artist) and Wade "Unique" Adams (Alex Newell) perform "Sgt. Pepper's Lonely Hearts Club Band". Afterwards, Sue announces Tina and Stoner Brett (Ryan Heinke) as prom queen and prom king. On Bree's command, Dottie reluctantly drops a bucket of red slushie on Tina while she's on stage in the style of Carrie, and she exits in tears. New Directions follows her to the choir room, where they sing "Hey Jude" and encourage Tina to face the crowd and go back. She does so, receiving her much-awaited standing ovation.

Rachel is surprised at the diner by Mr. Campion (Peter Facinelli), the Funny Girl director, who tells her she has been cast as Fanny Brice. In Lima, cheerleading coach Roz Washington (NeNe Leakes) informs Sue that Bree is behind the prank and demands that she is punished. Sue instead promotes Bree to captain of the Cheerios and encourages her to torment New Directions as much as she can, in order to toughen them up in preparations for Nationals. Rachel, Kurt, Santana, and Dani perform "Let It Be" in celebration of Rachel's achievements, while New Directions does the same song in honor of Tina.

== Production ==
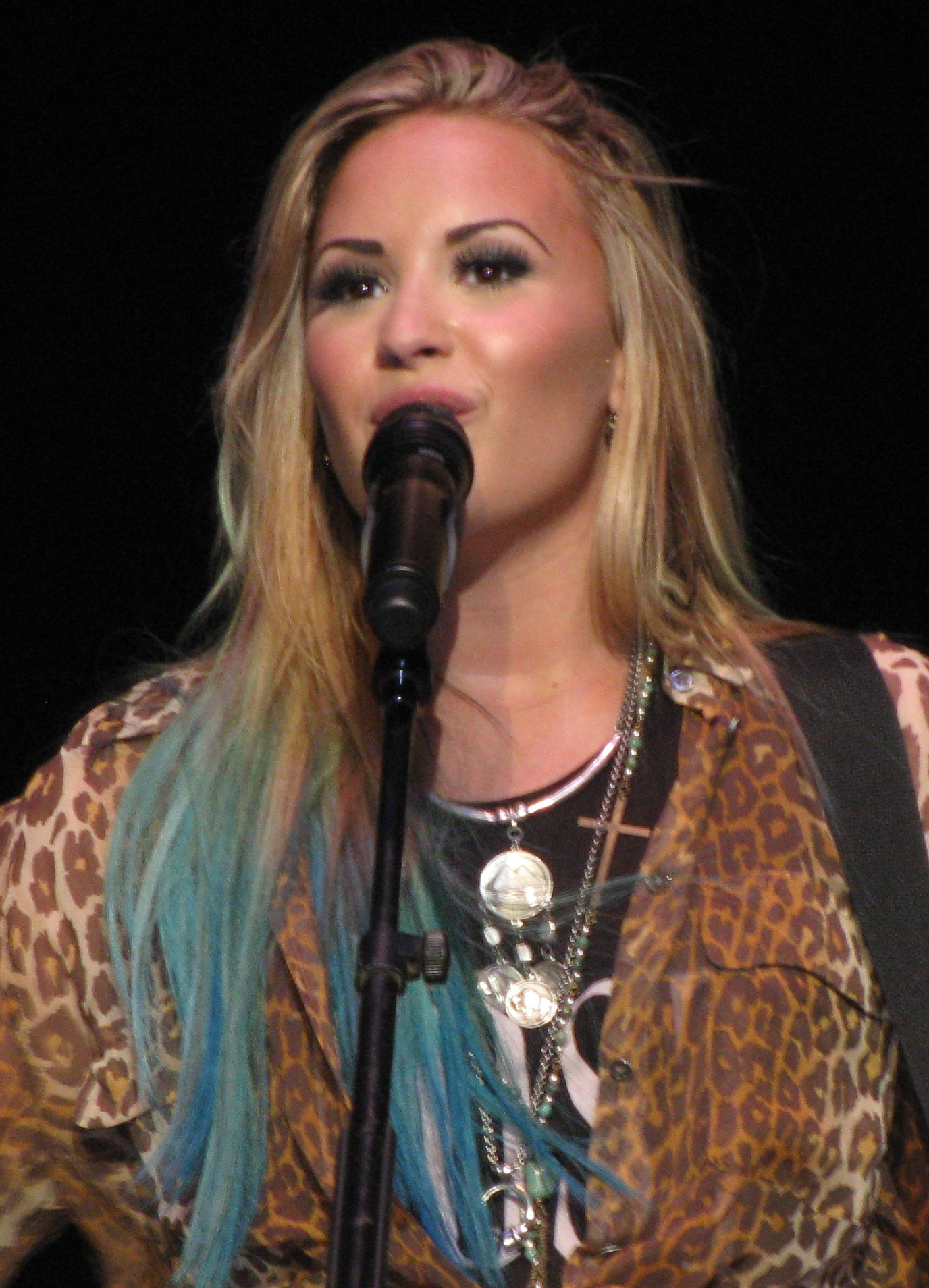
Special guest star Demi Lovato makes her first appearance as Dani

Two new recurring characters debut in this episode. The first, Dani, played by special guest star Demi Lovato, who is set to appear in at least six episodes during the fifth season, has been described as a "starving artist" in New York City who becomes friends with Rachel and Santana. Naya Rivera, who plays Santana, has stated in an interview that Dani will be Santana's "love interest". The second new recurring character, Penny Owen, who is played by Phoebe Strole, has been said to be a college sophomore who wants to become a nurse, and is planned to be Sam's new girlfriend; subsequent information from Fox has her as McKinley High's "new school nurse", who has to give Sam a shot in this episode.

Special guest star Peter Facinelli returns as Rupert Campion, the Funny Girl director. Other recurring characters credited in this episode include McKinley janitor and former principal Figgins (Iqbal Theba), cheerleading coach Roz Washington (NeNe Leakes), cheerleader Bree (Erinn Westbrook), and Spotlight Diner owner Gunther (Christopher Curry).

Songs from this episode and the previous one have been released on the album Glee Sings the Beatles, which contains fourteen songs by the Glee cast originally written and performed by the Beatles. Eight of these songs were performed in "Love, Love, Love". The six remaining appeared in this episode: "Get Back" is performed by Michele and Colfer; "Something" is sung by Overstreet; "Here Comes the Sun" is performed by Rivera and Lovato; "Sgt. Pepper's Lonely Hearts Club Band" is sung by Jenner, Newell, Benoist and Artist; "Hey Jude"is performed by New Directions; and "Let It Be" is performed by Michele, Rivera, Colfer, and members of New Directions. The album was made available for pre-order on iTunes on September 10, 2013, and was released on September 24, 2013, nine days before this episode airs. The episode features another Beatles song, "Revolution", which was performed by Ushkowitz in a truncated version, and was not released on the album or as a single.

== Reception ==
=== Ratings ===
"Tina in the Sky with Diamonds" was first broadcast on October 3, 2013 in the United States. It garnered a 1.6/5 Nielsen rating/share and received 4.42 million American during its initial airing. The total viewership and ratings were down significantly from those of the previous episode, "Love, Love, Love", which was watched by 5.06 million American viewers and acquired a 2.0/5 rating/share in the 18–49 demographic upon first airing one week before.

Via Twitter, the episode placed seventh overall for the week.

=== Critical response ===
"Tina in the Sky with Diamonds" received generally positive reviews by critics. Miranda Wicker of TV Fanatic gave the episode a four out of five, saying the episode "was a strong second week for Glee, Beatles week continued on Glee and this one was (even) better than last thursday's premiere, there was Sue snark, there was progress in the story lines, there was great music, there was Demi Lovato." She also wrote the episode "was a solid second episode of the season, building up enough momentum so far that next week's tribute to Cory Monteith will be appropriately devastating".

Lauren Hoffman of Vulture gave the episode a four out of five saying that "there was character growth, there were actual jokes, and there were songs that were actually relevant to the situations in which they were being sung." She praised the "Hey Jude" scene, saying that it was "oddly powerful, as is the fact that they storm back into the gym as a cohesive unit".

Brandon Nowalk of The A.V. Club graded the episode "B−", He commented "I just hope the writers are asking themselves why they're doing what they're doing as often as I'm asking myself every Thursday night."

Ian Bloom of Guardian Express gave the episode a positive review saying "feel good" and wrote "these last two episodes have been fairly typical, Glee wise, but they take on a different taste and feel because we know something tragic is going to happen".

MaryAnn Sleasman from TV.com also gave the episode a positive review saying "that was better last week's episode" and said that ""Love Love Love" set the bar pretty low to kick off the season". Also, she shows worried about next week episode.

=== Music and performances ===
An album was released on September 24, 2013 to coincide with the premiere of the season, which features music from this episode and the previous episode "Love, Love, Love". The album, Glee Sings the Beatles, has received generally positive reviews from critics. Heather Phares of AllMusic wrote: "The July 2013 death of Cory Monteith, cast a pall on the beginning of Glee's fifth season", than she added that two of the album's songs, concretely "Yesterday" and "Let It Be" were "bookended versions of the Fab Four's cheerier fare with subdued renditions of two of the band's most poignant songs". Phares also commented positively on how "[the album] could have left the cast's women stuck on the sidelines as screaming Beatlemaniacs, [but instead] it had the ladies front and center [on songs] like the sweet rendition of "Here Comes the Sun" and the playful take on "A Hard Day's Night". She then calls the album as "a promising start to season five's music".
