= The End of Twerk =

- Glee episode
- Episode no.: Season 5 Episode 5
- Directed by: Wendey Stanzler
- Written by: Michael Hitchcock
- Production code: 5ARC05
- Original air date: November 14, 2013

Guest appearances
- Ioan Gruffudd as Paolo San Pablo; Peter Facinelli as Rupert Campion; Lauren Potter as Becky Jackson; Erinn Westbrook as Bree; Bill A. Jones as Rod Remington; Earlene Davis as Andrea Carmichael; Christopher Cousins as Superintendent Bob Harris; Bradford Tatum as Louis the tattoo artist

Episode chronology
← Previous "A Katy or a Gaga"	Next → "Movin' Out"
- Glee season 5

"The End of Twerk" is the fifth episode of the fifth season of the American musical television series Glee, and the ninety-third episode overall. Written by Michael Hitchcock, and directed by Wendey Stanzler, it aired on Fox in the United States on November 14, 2013, and features the return of special guest stars Ioan Gruffudd as Paolo San Pablo, the Funny Girl leading man, and Peter Facinelli as Rupert Campion, the show's director.

== Plot ==
Glee club director Will Schuester (Matthew Morrison) decides to have New Directions twerk in Nationals to "edge up" their performance, and recruits Jake Puckerman (Jacob Artist) and Kitty Wilde (Becca Tobin) to teach the dance to the rest of the group. Meanwhile, Wade "Unique" Adams is caught using the girls' bathroom by Bree (Erinn Westbrook), and is forced to use the boys' bathroom from then on.

In New York, Rachel Berry (Lea Michele) rehearses "You Are Woman, I Am Man" from Funny Girl with her co-star, Paolo San Pablo (Ioan Gruffud), and surprises the director, Rupert Campion (Peter Facinelli), by wearing a wig during the performance, which he agrees fits the character. Rachel later tells Kurt Hummel (Chris Colfer) how it was positive for her to rebel a bit after Finn Hudson's death, and convinces Kurt that they should both get tattoos.

In Lima, Principal Sue Sylvester (Jane Lynch) is appalled by Will's assignment and bans twerking from McKinley High. Will refuses to accept this and performs "Blurred Lines" with New Directions and other students, misunderstanding the meaning of the song. Sue fires him, but he appeals to the school board by showing how several dances were, in their time, considered as controversial as twerking, and is reinstated.

Unique is bullied while using the boys' bathroom and sings "If I Were a Boy" in frustration. She later asks Sue for a unisex bathroom, and Sue places a portable toilet in the middle of the choir room to get back at Will. He then volunteers to let Unique use the faculty bathroom every time she needs. Upon learning of this, Sue offers to give Unique her own key if Will ends the twerking assignment and cancels his plans to have them do it at Nationals, and Will grudgingly accepts Sue's proposal.

Back in New York, Kurt is horrified to find out his tattoo is wrong, and that Rachel didn't get hers. He later confronts the tattoo artist (Bradford Tatum), who reveals Kurt misspelled it. He offers to fix it free of charge in order to motivate Kurt to not stop taking risks, and Kurt ends up getting a tongue piercing as well. Unbeknownst to him, Rachel did, in fact, get a tattoo, which spells "Finn".

Back in Lima, Bree tells Marley Rose (Melissa Benoist) that she had sex with Jake. Marley confronts Jake and breaks up with him when he confirms he has cheated on her with Bree. A heartbroken Marley then sings "Wrecking Ball". The following day, Will tells the club about his deal with Sue, and Blaine announces he has found a perfect song for them to do that fits their style: they perform "On Our Way".

== Production ==
Co-creator Ryan Murphy revealed the name of the episode in a tweet on October 2, 2013. In response to a later tweet, he said that the show would be doing at least one song by Miley Cyrus during the season, and continued, "I think she's wildly talented and very smart."

Special guest stars Ioan Gruffudd and Peter Facinelli return as Paolo San Pablo and Rupert Campion, the Funny Girl leading man and director, respectively. Other recurring characters in the episode include TV anchor Rod Remington (Bill A. Jones) and his wife Andrea Carmichael (Earlene Davis), McKinley's new superintendent, Bob Harris (Christopher Cousins), and McKinley cheerleaders Becky Jackson (Lauren Potter) and Bree (Erinn Westbrook).

Five songs from the episode are being released as singles: "You Are Woman, I Am Man" from Funny Girl sung by Gruffudd and Michele, Miley Cyrus's "Wrecking Ball" sung by Benoist, Beyoncé's "If I Were a Boy" sung by Newell, Robin Thicke's "Blurred Lines" sung by Morrison, McHale, Artist and Westbrook, and The Royal Concept's "On Our Way" sung by New Directions.

== Reception ==
=== Ratings ===
The episode was watched by 4.22 million American viewers, and received an 18-49 rating/share of 1.4/4.

=== Critical reception ===
The episode received mixed reviews from critics. Rae Votta of Billboard gave the episode a positive review, saying "An episode with a title like 'The End of Twerk' sounds like a Glee recipe for disaster, but by all miracles this week skirted the line of absurd, touching, and managed to advance multiple character narratives. The last is especially a feat in the world of Glee, and if the audience has to endure a little booty shaking and inappropriate Mr. Schue failures to get there, then so be it." Derek Chavis of The Baltimore Sun also gave the episode a positive review, despite expecting to dislike it, saying "Glee nailed tonight for the first time all season and made me feel like I was watching the show I've loved for the last four years."

Laura Frances of Screen Crave gave the episode an 8.5 out of 10, saying "Even if twerking is an awful dance, it's always entertaining to watch people 'shake it', especially when they don't know how to (which was pretty much the case in this episode). For the most part, 'The End Of Twerk' was another success for Glee's fifth season. New storylines were introduced like Unique's bully problem, and Marley and Jake's breakup. Plus, we like that Mr. Schue is playing on Sue's level. He was on fire last night."

Miranda Wicker of TV Fanatic gave the episode a 3 out of 5, signaling mixed to positive reviews, saying the episode "was actually not terrible despite the ridiculous devotion to the dance move currently winning awards for the dumbest name ever. Will Schuester actually made me think twerking is maybe not so bad... and then I started to wonder if perhaps I'm living in some sort of parallel universe."

Lauren Hoffman of Vulture gave the episode a 2 out of 5, signaling more negative reviews, saying

What exactly was the point of last night's episode? Why revisit Miley and twerking and the inarguably rape-y implications of 'Blurred Lines'? Because it's certainly not like viewers at home have been champing at the bit to see how, exactly, Glee inserts itself into that particular drama. The debate around twerking started months ago and, in my estimation, ended soon after. How in the world does Glee stand to benefit from reigniting that debate? It seems reasonable to conclude that the entire point of last night’s episode was that viewers should re-engage and get up in arms about 'Blurred Lines', but I'm personally exhausted when it comes to that particular battle and I'm willing to bet that the majority of Glee's viewers are, too.

Hoffman did comment positively on Rachel and Kurt's subplot, saying "What's intriguing is Rachel's insistence to Kurt that rebellion is, in some way, desirable and important. Glee has examined rebellion in the past, but never as a virtue that the New Directions members should strive for." MaryAnn Sleasman of TV.com also commented on Rachel and Kurt's storyline, saying "Rachel and Kurt, struggling to reconnect to themselves in the wake of Finn's death, [...] could've used more screen time. The disruptive Lima/NY narrative split has been an issue since Rachel's class graduated and went their separate ways, though some episodes have handled it better than others."

Esther Gim of BuddyTV gave the episode a negative review, saying "This is one of the most unoriginal storylines in the history of the show, like someone zapped all the writers of their creative juices. But hooray, there is an end in sight, since the episode is titled 'End of Twerk' after all."
