= New New York (Glee) =

- Glee episode
- Episode no.: Season 5 Episode 14
- Directed by: Sanaa Hamri
- Written by: Ryan Murphy
- Production code: 5ARC14
- Original air date: April 1, 2014

Guest appearances
- Amber Riley as Mercedes Jones; Michael Lerner as Sidney Greene; Adam Lambert as Elliott "Starchild" Gilbert; Nicholas Kadi as Alain Marceau; Riley Voelkel as Sam; Charles Melton as Sam's roommate; Manos Gavras as Rachel's driver

Episode chronology
← Previous "New Directions"	Next → "Bash"
- Glee season 5

"New New York" is the fourteenth episode of the fifth season of the American musical television series Glee, and the 102nd episode overall. It aired on Fox in the United States on April 1, 2014. Effective with this episode, the action of the show is to be centered in New York City, and continue there for the remainder of the season.

== Plot ==
Life in New York City has its own challenges for the newly transplanted McKinley graduates and already established glee club members, now that some months have passed. Rachel Berry (Lea Michele) is a leading lady on Broadway with all that entails, Kurt Hummel (Chris Colfer) is now rooming with both fiancé Blaine Anderson (Darren Criss) and Sam Evans (Chord Overstreet), and film school student Artie Abrams (Kevin McHale) has trouble getting places in his wheelchair. Mercedes Jones (Amber Riley) is another arrival in the city; she is looking to record a new album.

== Production ==
With this episode, the show shifts to New York City, where the action will be centered for the remainder of the fifth season, and resumes chronologically after "a few months" have passed since the two-part episode that featured the end of the school year and the glee club's demise. This episode features the smallest number of main cast members present: Michele (Rachel), Colfer (Kurt), McHale (Artie), Criss (Blaine) and Overstreet (Sam). The rest of the season 5 main cast are credited but do not appear.

Recurring characters appearing in this episode include aspiring singer Mercedes Jones (Amber Riley), NYU student and Kurt's band member Elliott "Starchild" Gilbert (Adam Lambert), and Funny Girl producer Sidney Greene (Michael Lerner).

Six songs from the episode are being released on a six-track EP with the same title as the episode. These include: Petula Clark's "Downtown", sung by Michele, Colfer, Criss, McHale and Overstreet; Frank Sinatra's "You Make Me Feel So Young", sung by Criss and Colfer; "Best Day of My Life" by the American Authors, sung by Criss and Overstreet; Petula Clark's "Don't Sleep in the Subway", sung by Michele and McHale; "People" from Funny Girl, sung by Michele; and "Rockstar" by A Great Big World, sung by Lambert and Colfer.

== Reception ==
=== Ratings ===
The episode was watched by 2.59 million American viewers, and received an 18-49 rating/share of 0.9/3, matching series low ratings with "Puppet Master" and "City of Angels." The show placed fourth in its timeslot and thirteenth for the night.

=== Critical reception ===
The episode received critical acclaim from critics. Rae Votta of Billboard called the episode "hands-down the best episode of “Glee” to date. There's barely any contest. Season 1 purists will hold up the Pilot as an ideal episode, and you admittedly couldn't get to here without those inventive and inspiring beginnings, but that's just building blocks and not substance. After 4 1/2 years “Glee” has evolved from a plucky magical reality about high school underdogs to a group of friends living out their ambitions in New York City, and it finally feels right. Kurt and Rachel's New York of the last year-and-a-half felt like a fable, but bring some more of McKinley there and it settles into the reality that “Glee’s” always promised."

Suzanne Davis of TV Fanatic gave the episode 3 stars out of 5.

Jodi Walker of Entertainment Weekly commented positively on the show's new change in direction, saying "It really felt like watching a different show tonight. Or maybe more like watching the old show? Before everything got so convoluted; before we watched characters we didn’t really know share airtime with characters we were maybe too familiar with; before things just straight up went off the rails. It didn’t exactly feel like season 1 or 2 of Glee; more like a cousin to that classic version of Glee. A cool New York cousin who plays with lighting and films outside of a sound stage and only listens to old vinyl records of the classics. She also occasionally has one too many glasses of wine and can’t stop speaking in voiceover."

MaryAnn Sleasman of TV.com also commented positively on the show's move in New York, saying that "The result is a show that suddenly feels exciting, fresh, and BIG." She also praised the musical performances, saying that they felt sophisticated and glamorous and fun with their extended dance sequences, toned-down color schemes, and sweeping scenery.
