= I'm Still Here (Follies song) =

Song from the 1971 musical "Follies"

"I'm Still Here" is a song written by Stephen Sondheim for the 1971 musical Follies.

== Production ==
"I'm Still Here" was introduced in the musical Follies, which premiered on Broadway at the Winter Garden Theatre on April 4, 1971. The song is performed by former Follies showgirl Carlotta Campion, a role originated by Yvonne De Carlo.

Other notable performers cast as Carlotta in U.S. productions of Follies include Carol Burnett in the 1985 Lincoln Center concerts, Ann Miller in the 1998 Paper Mill Playhouse production, Polly Bergen in the 2001 Broadway revival, Christine Baranski in the 2007 City Center Encores production, and Elaine Paige in the 2011 Broadway revival.

In the West End, Carlotta was played by Dolores Gray in 1987, and Tracie Bennett in the 2017 and 2019 revivals.

Barbra Streisand, Eartha Kitt, and Sammy Davis Jr. have featured the song as part of their concert performances, often rewriting some lyrics to reflect their own careers.

== Background ==
"I'm Still Here" was written during the out of town tryout for Follies in Boston, when Sondheim decided that another song ("Can That Boy Foxtrot") was not working. This song had been written as a throwaway song for a minor character, but Yvonne De Carlo was a high-profile name in the cast, and the creative team felt she deserved a more substantial song. The librettist James Goldman suggested it should be a song about survival that said 'I'm still here.' Sondheim borrowed the phrase for the song title. It is an example of a "list song". Sondheim noted that "the song develops through decades" (p. 181). Stephen Banfield describes it as "a blues song" (p. 183). The tune was written as a pastiche of Harold Arlen, one of Sondheim's favorite Broadway composers.

June Abernathy provided an explanation of some of the terms and references in the song. For example, in the phrase "I’ve slept in shanties, Guest of the W.P.A.", "W.P.A." means the Works Projects Administration (1935–43), a U.S. government agency. "Windsor and Wally’s affair" refers to King Edward VIII, King of England in 1936, and Wallis Warfield Simpson, an American divorcee.

== Synopsis ==
Carlotta is a former showgirl who became a movie star and later a nightclub performer and television star. In this song she sings about the many adventures she has been through during her long career, and explains that she has outlived it all. She describes rising from poverty during the Great Depression through luck and perseverance despite limited training. The next verses describe surviving the excesses of show business success, including alcoholism, drug addiction and rehabilitation, as well as going through the Hollywood Blacklist.

Sondheim loosely based the song on the career of Joan Crawford, stating "She [Crawford] started as a silent film-star, then she became a sound-star, and she eventually became superannuated and started to do camp movies [...] she became a joke on and of herself, but she survived." This shows up in the line 'First you're another sloe-eyed vamp/ Then someone's mother/ then you're camp/ then you career from career to career/ I'm almost through my memoirs/ and I'm here!'

== Critical reception ==
Variety describes the song as "electric". The New York Times called it "the song of the survivor". Elaine Stritch told Stephen Sondheim that an actress has only earned the right to perform the song once they reach 80. She expressed her frustration that the many women who perform the song in their forties, fifties, and even sixties, lack the life experience necessary, demanding to know "where have they been?"

== Recordings ==
Many performers have recorded the song, including cast albums and other recordings. Among them are: Yvonne DeCarlo in the original 1971 Broadway production; Nancy Walker in Sondheim: A Musical Tribute (1973); Millicent Martin in Side by Side by Sondheim (1976); Gemma Craven in Songs of Sondheim (1977); Carol Burnett in Follies in Concert (1985); Julie Wilson in Sings the Stephen Sondheim Songbook (1988); Cleo Laine in Cleo Sings Sondheim (1988); Dorothy Loudon in The Stephen Sondheim Album (2000); Elaine Stritch in At Liberty (2002) and Sondheim the Birthday Concert (2010); Elaine Paige in 2011 Broadway Revival Cast Recording; and Shirley Bassey in Hello Like Before (2014).

== In popular culture ==
The character Doris Mann, played by Shirley MacLaine, performed the song in the 1990 film Postcards from the Edge. Sondheim wrote special lyrics for MacLaine, at the request of director Mike Nichols.

The character Lillian Bennett, played by Carol Burnett, performed the song in a 1997 episode of Touched by an Angel.

The character Kurt Hummel, played by Chris Colfer, performed the song in a 2014 episode of Glee, with TVLine rating the performance an "A".

The character Frederica Norman, played by Patti LuPone, performed the song in a 2019 episode of Pose (season 2, episode 6).
