= Glee: The Quarterback =

EP by Glee Cast
- Released: October 7, 2013
- Genre: Pop
- Length: 20:52
- Label: Columbia; 20th Century Fox TV

Glee Cast chronology
Glee Sings the Beatles (2013)	Glee: The Quarterback (2013)	Glee: The Music, The Christmas Album Volume 4 (2013)

Glee: The Quarterback is an extended play (EP) by the cast of the American musical television show Glee. It was released on iTunes on October 7, 2013, three days before the fifth season's third episode "The Quarterback". The album features six songs recorded for the episode, which ended Cory Monteith's character, Finn Hudson.

== Commercial performance ==
Predictions suggested the EP would debut in the top ten of the United States' Billboard 200, selling around 30,000 copies. By October 16, 2013, the album debuted at number 7 on the Billboard 200, selling 47,000 copies. This is the franchise's first album to chart in the top ten in the United States in a year and half, since the third season release of Glee, The Music: The Graduation Album on May 15, 2012. This album is also the fourteenth album of the series to chart in the top ten. The last album of the Glee franchise to chart on the Billboard 200 was the album Glee Sings the Beatles, which debuted at number 38. The extended play also debuted at number 1 on Billboard Soundtracks.

== Track listing ==
No.	Title	Original artist	Length
1.	"Seasons of Love"	Rent	3:04
2.	"I'll Stand by You"	The Pretenders	3:45
3.	"Fire and Rain"	James Taylor	3:23
4.	"If I Die Young"	The Band Perry	3:41
5.	"No Surrender"	Bruce Springsteen	3:44
6.	"Make You Feel My Love"	Bob Dylan	3:15
Total length:			20:52

Japanese CD
No.	Title	Original artist	Length
7.	"I Still Haven't Found What I'm Looking For"	U2	3:58
Total length:			24:10

== Personnel ==
- Adam Anders – arranger, engineer, producer, soundtrack producer, vocals
- Chris Colfer – vocals
- Peer Åström – engineer, mixing, producer
- Geoff Bywater – executive in charge of music
- Dante Di Loreto – executive producer
- Bob Dylan – composer
- Brad Falchuk – executive producer
- Chrissie Hynde – composer
- Jonathan Larson – composer
- Tom Kelly – composer
- Kevin McHale – vocals
- Lea Michele – vocals
- Ryan Murphy – producer, soundtrack producer
- Chord Overstreet – vocals
- Kimberly Perry – composer
- Ryan Peterson – engineer
- Amber Riley – vocals
- Naya Rivera – vocals
- Mark Salling – vocals
- Harry Shum Jr. - vocals
- Bruce Springsteen – composer
- Billy Steinberg – composer
- James Taylor – composer
- Jenna Ushkowitz – vocals

== Charts ==
Chart (2013)	Peak position
Billboard 200	7
Billboard Top Soundtracks	1

== See also ==
- List of songs in Glee (season 5)
