= Glee Sings the Beatles =

Soundtrack album by Glee Cast
- Released: September 24, 2013
- Recorded: 2013
- Genres: Pop; rock
- Length: 40:13; 51:04 (Japanese edition)
- Label: Columbia / 20th Century Fox TV
- Producers: Dante Di Loreto (exec.), Brad Falchuk (exec.), Adam Anders, Peer Åström, Ryan Gillmor, Ryan Murphy

Glee Cast chronology
Glee: The Music, The Christmas Album Volume 3 (2012)	Glee Sings the Beatles (2013)	Glee: The Quarterback (2013)

Glee Sings the Beatles is the fifteenth soundtrack album by the cast of the American musical television show Glee. It was made available for pre-order on iTunes on September 10, 2013, with the expected to be released date on September 24, 2013, two days before the fifth season premiere. The album features fourteen songs recorded for the first two episodes of the season: "Love Love Love" and "Tina in the Sky with Diamonds".

== Background ==
This is not the first time the cast of Glee pays tribute to famous artists. Recurring guest star Demi Lovato is also featured in one of the tracks of the album. Back on August 3, 2010, Paul McCartney, reportedly a fan of the show, sent a mixtape featuring his music to Glee creator Ryan Murphy in an attempt to convince Murphy to include some of the songs in the upcoming season. "I received some fantastic mixtapes from Paul McCartney a couple of weeks ago. I thought I was being punked!" Murphy said at 2010's Television Critics Association panel in Los Angeles. However, The Beatles' tribute episode was never planned to be aired on season two, three or four of the show.

The two-part premiere episodes of the tribute featured glee club director Will Schuester, portrayed by actor Matthew Morrison, assigning the students in the club to sing songs by the early Beatles (on "Love Love Love") and by the late Beatles (on "Tina in the Sky with Diamonds").

The Japanese version of the album features Beatles songs that were sung by the cast in earlier episodes (seasons 1 to 3)

== Reception ==
=== Critical response ===
Professional ratings
Review scores
Source	Rating
Allmusic	3.5/5 stars
PopCrush	3.5/5 stars

The album has received generally positive reviews from professional critics. Heather Phares of Allmusic wrote: "The July 2013 death of Cory Monteith, cast a pall on the beginning of Glee's fifth season," adding that two of the album's songs, "Yesterday" and "Let It Be" were "bookended versions of the Fab Four's cheerier fare with subdued renditions of two of the band's most poignant songs". Phares also commented positively on how "[the album] could have left the cast's women stuck on the sidelines as screaming Beatlemaniacs, [but instead] it had the ladies front and center [on songs] like the sweet rendition of "Here Comes the Sun" and the playful take on "A Hard Day's Night". In other words the Allmusic review calls the album as "a promising start to season five's music".

=== Commercial performance ===
The album debuted at number 38 on the US Billboard 200.

== Track listing ==
All tracks are written by Lennon–McCartney, except tracks 10 & 11, which were written by George Harrison.

No.	Title	Length
1.	"Yesterday"	2:33
2.	"Drive My Car"	2:32
3.	"Got to Get You into My Life"	2:29
4.	"You've Got to Hide Your Love Away"	2:43
5.	"Help"	2:18
6.	"A Hard Day's Night"	2:27
7.	"I Saw Her Standing There"	2:40
8.	"All You Need Is Love"	3:16
9.	"Get Back"	2:26
10.	"Here Comes the Sun" (featuring Demi Lovato)	3:00
11.	"Something"	3:01
12.	"Sgt. Pepper's Lonely Hearts Club Band"	1:54
13.	"Hey Jude"	4:51
14.	"Let It Be"	4:03
Total length:		40:13

Japanese bonus tracks
No.	Title	Length
15.	"Hello, Goodbye"	3:29
16.	"I Want to Hold Your Hand"	2:38
17.	"Blackbird"	2:20
18.	"In My Life"	2:24
Total length:		51:04

== Personnel ==
- Adam Anders – arranger, engineer, producer, soundtrack producer, vocals
- Jacob Artist – vocals
- Melissa Benoist – vocals
- Chris Colfer – vocals
- Darren Criss – vocals
- Peer Åström – engineer, mixing, producer
- Geoff Bywater – executive in charge of music
- Dante Di Loreto – executive producer
- Brad Falchuk – executive producer
- George Harrison – composer
- Blake Jenner – vocals
- John Lennon – composer
- Demi Lovato – vocals
- Paul McCartney – composer
- Kevin McHale – vocals
- Lea Michele – vocals
- Ryan Murphy – producer, soundtrack producer
- Alex Newell – vocals
- Chord Overstreet – vocals
- Ryan Peterson – engineer
- Naya Rivera – vocals
- Becca Tobin – vocals
- Jenna Ushkowitz – vocals

== Charts ==
Chart (2013)	Peak position
Australian Albums Chart	48
Irish Albums Chart	92
UK Albums Chart	89
US Billboard 200	38
US Billboard Soundtracks	2

== Release history ==
Region	Release date	Label	Format
United Kingdom	September 23, 2013	Twentieth Century Fox	Digital download
Canada	September 23, 2013	Sony Music Canada Inc.	CD, digital download
Ireland	September 23, 2013	Twentieth Century Fox	CD, digital download
Taiwan	September 23, 2013	Twentieth Century Fox	CD, digital download
Italy	September 23, 2013	Twentieth Century Fox	CD, digital download
Sweden	September 23, 2013	Twentieth Century Fox	CD, digital download
Thailand	September 23, 2013	Twentieth Century Fox	CD, digital download
United States	September 24, 2013	Twentieth Century Fox	CD, digital download
Australia	October 4, 2013	Twentieth Century Fox	CD, digital download
New Zealand	October 4, 2013	Twentieth Century Fox	CD, digital download
United Kingdom	October 7, 2013	Music Division	CD

== See also ==
- List of songs in Glee (season 5)
