= Movin' Out (Glee) =

- Glee episode
- Episode no.: Season 5 Episode 6
- Directed by: Brad Falchuk
- Written by: Roberto Aguirre-Sacasa
- Production code: 5ARC06
- Original air date: November 21, 2013

Guest appearances
- Tyra Banks as Bichette; Lauren Potter as Becky Jackson; Erinn Westbrook as Bree; Trisha Rae Stahl as Millie Rose; Andi Chapman as Arwyyd Johnson; Mal Merpi as the University of Cincinnati tour guide; Wendle Josepher as Barbara Brownfield

Episode chronology
← Previous "The End of Twerk"	Next → "Puppet Master"
- Glee season 5

"Movin' Out" is the sixth episode of the fifth season of the American musical television series Glee, and the ninety-fourth episode overall. It was written by Roberto Aguirre-Sacasa and directed by Brad Falchuk, and it aired on Fox in the United States on November 21, 2013. The episode is a tribute to the music of Billy Joel, and features seven of his songs. The episode features special guest star Tyra Banks as Bichette, the head of a modeling agency.

== Plot ==
Glee club director Will Schuester (Matthew Morrison) finds out that Principal Sue Sylvester (Jane Lynch) has organized a career fair at McKinley High, but refused to include any arts-related booths, as she believes pursuing a career in the entertainment industry will likely result in failure. Will is forced to admit that show business is a very difficult professional area, and assigns New Directions to perform songs by Billy Joel, due to his notorious struggle to reach stardom.

Blaine Anderson (Darren Criss) and Sam Evans (Chord Overstreet) perform "Movin' Out" before traveling to New York to scout potential colleges while staying with Rachel Berry (Lea Michele), Kurt Hummel (Chris Colfer) and Santana Lopez (Naya Rivera). Later, at the Spotlight Diner, Kurt encourages Blaine to perform as training for his NYADA audition, and Blaine sings "Piano Man" to much acclaim. However, he becomes hesitant to audition for NYADA, a college purely focused on the arts, until Kurt reassures him he will find success pursuing his passion.

In Lima, Jake Puckerman (Jacob Artist) attempts to apologize to Marley Rose (Melissa Benoist) for cheating on her, but she rejects him. Angry, Jake decides to embrace his lifestyle as a womanizer and sings "My Life" to Marley. Noticing that Jake has hurt her, Ryder Lynn (Blake Jenner) asks Marley out, and later serenades her with "An Innocent Man", convincing her to accept his offer. Meanwhile, Artie Abrams (Kevin McHale) notices Becky Jackson (Lauren Potter) observing the booths of the career fair and attempts to encourage her to attend college, but is rebuffed by Sue, who wants to keep Becky safe in McKinley as her secretary. Wanting to help Becky, Artie sings "Honesty" to her and later takes her on a tour of the University of Cincinnati, which has a program for students with special needs. Sue consents to the idea and later encourages Becky to attend college, realizing she is ready.

In New York, Sam has a disastrous interview for a scholarship, and later confides in Rachel that he doesn't want to go to college and his dream is to become a male model. Rachel sets up a photoshoot in the loft and makes Sam a portfolio, which he submits to a prestigious modeling agent, Bichette (Tyra Banks). Although she is interested in adding him to her roster, she insists that he lose 10 pounds. Sam initially attempts to do so, but Rachel, Blaine, Kurt and Santana talk him out of it and, through a performance of "Just the Way You Are", convince Sam to scout other modeling agencies.

In Lima, Ryder is excited over the prospect of having a relationship with Marley, but she claims to still be recovering from her break-up with Jake and that she is not ready for a new relationship, leaving Ryder disappointed. Jake teases the two about their budding relationship and flaunts his multiple partners to Marley. Sam and Blaine return after Blaine successfully auditions for NYADA and tell Sue that she is wrong about pursuing a career in the arts. Emboldened by their success, and by ending this day, Will leads New Directions and the entire student body in a performance of "You May Be Right".

== Production ==
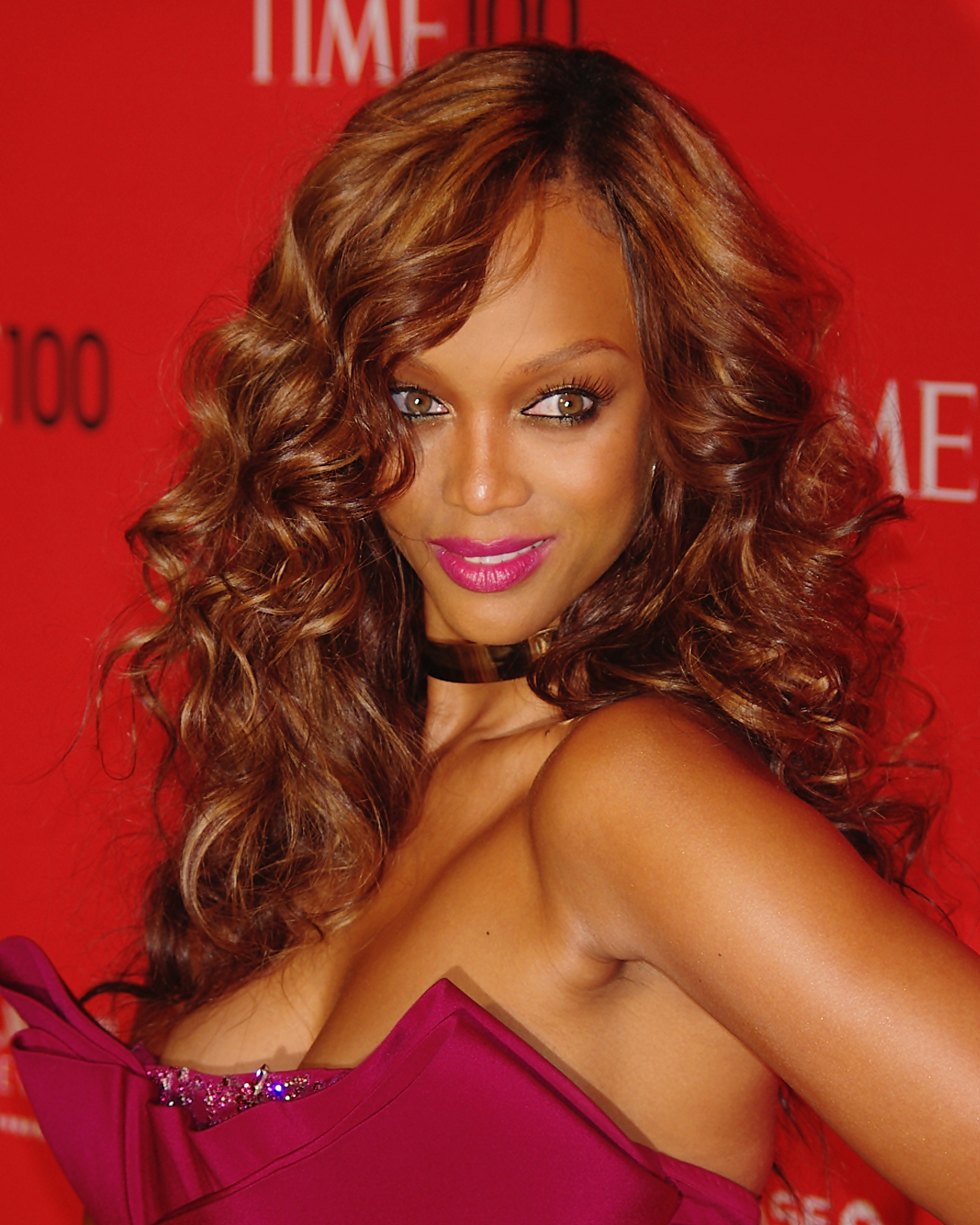
Tyra Banks guest stars in this episode as Bichette

The episode was in production during mid-October; Billy Joel's website announced the episode's air date and six songs that are set to appear in it on October 10, 2013, though ultimately a seventh song was also included.

Special guest star, actress and former model Tyra Banks appears as Bichette, head of her own modeling agency in New York City, who interviews Sam as a potential model.

Recurring characters in this episode include McKinley cheerleaders Becky Jackson (Lauren Potter) and Bree (Erinn Westbrook), and McKinley lunch lady and Marley's mother Millie Rose (Trisha Rae Stahl).

Seven songs by Billy Joel are being featured in this episode: "Movin' Out" performed by Darren Criss and Overstreet, "Piano Man" sung by Criss, "My Life" sung by Jacob Artist, "Honesty" sung by Kevin McHale, "An Innocent Man" sung by Blake Jenner, "You May Be Right" performed by New Directions and "Just the Way You Are" performed by Criss, Overstreet, Michele, Chris Colfer and Naya Rivera.

== Reception ==
=== Ratings ===
The episode was watched by 4.09 million American viewers and received an 18-49 rating/share of 1.4/4. The viewership was down from the previous episode, and tied in ratings from the previous as well. The show placed third in its timeslot and ninth for the night.

Including DVR numbers, the episode's 18-49 rating was raised to 2.3.

=== Billy Joel's reaction ===
Billy Joel commented positively on the use of his music on the show, saying "Honestly, I've never seen the show. I'm one of those guys who watches the History Channel, and I watch news and I watch documentaries ... but I'm very happy that my material is being done by people of that age group, and that I guess it has meaning for them."

=== Critical reception ===
The episode was given moderately positive reviews from critics. Rae Votta of Billboard commented positively on the episode as a whole, but also criticized the season's pace, saying "This episode was thoroughly enjoyable -- even the Ryder/Marley/Jake aspects featured good numbers -- but at some point Glee needs to bite the bullet and let these poor kids graduate. They can talk (and sing) all they want about moving on but eventually the bandage has to come off, painful or not.

MaryAnn Sleasman of TV.com gave the episode a positive review, but issued skepticism for the show's future, saying the episode "was definitely watchable by Glee standards (or any standards, really) but I'm beginning to fear that we've started a backslide into Glee's usual modus operandi of not giving a shit."
