= Puppet Master (Glee) =

- Glee episode
- Episode no.: Season 5 Episode 7
- Directed by: Paul McCrane
- Written by: Matthew Hodgson
- Production code: 5ARC07
- Original air date: November 28, 2013

Guest appearances
- Demi Lovato as Dani; Iqbal Theba as Principal Figgins; Adam Lambert as Elliott "Starchild" Gilbert; Erinn Westbrook as Bree; Lauren Potter as Becky Jackson; Christopher Cousins as Superintendent Bob Harris; Brad Ellis as Brad

Episode chronology
← Previous "Movin' Out"	Next → "Previously Unaired Christmas"
- Glee season 5

"Puppet Master" is the seventh episode of the fifth season of the American musical television series Glee, and the ninety-fifth episode overall. Written by Matthew Hodgson and directed by Paul McCrane, it aired on Fox in the United States on November 28, 2013. The episode features the return of special guest star Demi Lovato as Dani, and of Adam Lambert as Elliott "Starchild" Gilbert. The reason why Sue Sylvester (Jane Lynch) always wears tracksuits is finally revealed.

== Plot ==
Glee club director Will Schuester (Matthew Morrison) is caught up with the school board's upcoming inspection of McKinley High and instructs the New Directions to brainstorm ideas for Nationals while he is unavailable. Blaine Anderson (Darren Criss) makes several suggestions that highlight him, and becomes offended when the others, aside from Jake Puckerman (Jacob Artist), reject his ideas and accuse him of being controlling. Angry and frustrated, Blaine storms out of the choir room and calls Kurt Hummel (Chris Colfer), who warns Blaine not to force his ideas upon the others and become a "puppet master". Kurt also reveals he booked Pamela Lansbury's first gig at Callbacks, which Blaine promises to attend. Rachel Berry (Lea Michele), Santana Lopez (Naya Rivera), Dani (Demi Lovato) and Elliott "Starchild" Gilbert (Adam Lambert) disagree over the choice of venue, but are convinced by how Kurt envisions their first performance, in which they sing "Into the Groove".

The school board visits McKinley ahead of the inspection to discuss with Sue Sylvester (Jane Lynch) the possibility of becoming full-time Principal, to which she agrees. She develops a crush on Superintendent Bob Harris (Christopher Cousins), and is disappointed to find out he thinks she is a man. Sue confides in Becky Jackson (Lauren Potter) that she changed her more feminine appearance and adopted her trademark tracksuits when she started working at McKinley, in order to be respected by the students. Becky then encourages Sue to embrace her femininity.

Blaine refuses to perform due to the New Directions' treatment of him and sits in the back of the choir room. Due to a gas leak, he hallucinates that his friends are puppets who idolize him, and leads them in a rendition of "You're My Best Friend". Blaine later thanks Jake for supporting him and mentions his experience at the back of the choir room that he is unable to explain. Jake continues to choreograph the Cheerios' dance routines, and upsets Bree (Erinn Westbrook) by bragging about having sex with the entire cheerleading squad. Will wants Jake to create a dance number for Nationals, but he refuses, claiming the glee club is not up to par with his talents. Sitting at the back of the choir room at Blaine's suggestion, he then hallucinates performing a mash-up of "Nasty" and "Rhythm Nation". Like Blaine, he is later unable to explain his hallucination. Shortly afterwards, Bree tells Jake she is pregnant and wants him to accompany her to the doctor's appointment.

Will offers to help Sue in exchange for additional money for the New Directions' Nationals wardrobe, but Sue refuses. While sitting in the back of the choir room, she hallucinates performing "Cheek to Cheek" with Will. Sue also confiscates a puppet of Kurt that Blaine made in crafts class due to him being unable to get over being called a "puppet master", and sends him to detention after he breaks into her office after hours to retrieve it, which prevents Blaine from attending Kurt's performance. He and Kurt get into a brief argument over the phone when Kurt finds out about the puppet, and Pamela Lansbury is later disappointed to discover the only person in their audience is a misguided old man hoping to meet Angela Lansbury.

Blaine, Jake and Becky meet in detention, and Blaine has another hallucination that helps him realise his need to try to control the situation due to stress is the reason he is hallucinating about puppets. Blaine then covers for Jake while he prepares to take Bree to the hospital. Bree, however, announces she just had a pregnancy scare. Jake is relieved, but Bree warns him that his narcissism and promiscuous ways will have unwanted consequences and he is more or less doomed to repeat his father and older brother's mistakes if he doesn't change soon, and cuts ties with him due to his bad influence. Moved by her words, Jake apologizes to Marley Rose (Melissa Benoist) for his selfish behavior and tries to make amends with her. Though Marley harbors no ill feelings for him, she confesses she now only views him as a friend and leaves him heartbroken.

Sue recruits Wade "Unique" Adams (Alex Newell) to help her, and impresses the school board, even fixing the gas leak. They promote her to full-time principal, and Sue asks Harris out on a date, but he still refuses. Simultaneously, Kurt announces that the old man from their audience happened to be the uncle of a scout, who has booked them a second gig at a popular nightclub. As an apology for his behavior, Blaine crafts puppets of all of his friends and presents them. To end this episode, The New Directions and Pamela Lansbury then simultaneously sing "The Fox".

== Production ==
The episode was in production around the end of October, when co-creator Ryan Murphy tweeted pictures of the puppets being featured in the episode, including a picture of Criss as Blaine surrounded by puppets.

Recurring characters in this episode include Santana's girlfriend and member of Kurt's band, Dani (special guest star Lovato), band member Elliott "Starchild" Gilbert (Lambert), McKinley cheerleaders Becky Jackson (Potter) and Bree (Westbrook), Lima schools superintendent Bob Harris (Cousins) and McKinley janitor and former principal Figgins (Iqbal Theba).

Six songs from the episode are being released as five singles: Queen's "You're My Best Friend" sung by Criss; "Cheek to Cheek" from Top Hat performed by Morrison and Lynch; the Janet Jackson mashup "Nasty / Rhythm Nation" performed by Artist, Benoist and Westbrook; Madonna's "Into the Groove" sung by Colfer, Lambert, Michele, Rivera and Lovato; and Ylvis's "The Fox" sung by the members of New Directions and Pamela Lansbury.

== Reception ==
=== Ratings ===
The episode, which aired on Thanksgiving in the United States, was watched by 2.84 million viewers and received an 18-49 rating/share of 0.9/3, making it the lowest rated episode of the series to date.

=== Critical reception ===
The episode received mixed reviews from critics. Rae Votta of Billboard gave the episode a positive review, saying it "is pretty straight-forward in that it’s about control -- characters who want to control the world around them, characters who can't control the image thrust on them by others, and characters who want to control themselves. It’s clean, and relatively linear for all its wackiness. And it actually works. If only all of Glee could be this good." She did, however, criticize the casts' performance of "The Fox (What Does the Fox Say?)," saying "it's absolutely batshit and nonsensical and yet somehow the perfect ending to an hour of gas-induced puppet, Janet Jackson and Fred Astaire related hallucinations." Brandon Nowalk of The A.V. Club gave the episode a B−, saying "Clearly there's new life in these characters—hell, old life in half of the New Directions—and low-key episodes like 'Puppet Master' make great opportunities to explore and define them. Artists are certainly allowed to fail. Hopefully Glee starts failing bigger."

Miranda Wicker of TV Fanatic gave the episode a more negative review, rating it a 1.5 out of 5, saying "The good news is that they buried an otherwise ridiculous and silly episode on a night when (probably) no one was watching, what with all the tryptophan comas and shopping. The bad news is that Glee Season 5 Episode 7 was 45 minutes of my life I can never get back and very little about it was redeeming." Samantha Highfill of Entertainment Weekly also received the episode negatively, saying "Overall, I think the episode was trying just a little too hard, and what maybe could have been cute (but probably not) forced me to watch most of the hour through squinted eyes, and not because I was tired from eating turkey."
