= Opening Night (Glee) =

- Glee episode
- Episode no.: Season 5 Episode 17
- Directed by: Eric Stoltz
- Written by: Michael Hitchcock
- Production code: 5ARC17
- Original air date: April 22, 2014

Guest appearances
- Chris Parnell as Mario; Amber Riley as Mercedes Jones; Michael Lerner as Sidney Greene; Lauren Potter as Becky Jackson; Max Adler as Dave Karofsky; Josh Sussman as Jacob Ben Israel; Bill A. Jones as Rod Remington; Earlene Davis as Andrea Carmichael; Chad Buchanan as the bartender; Rod McLachlan as the kiosk owner; Cyrina Fiallo as the online blogger; Tony Colitti as Salvatore

Episode chronology
← Previous "Tested"	Next → "The Back-up Plan"
- Glee season 5

"Opening Night" is the seventeenth episode of the fifth season of the American musical television series Glee, and the 105th episode overall. It was written by Michael Hitchcock and directed by Eric Stoltz, and it aired on Fox in the United States on April 22, 2014, and features Rachel Berry (Lea Michele) opening as Fanny Brice in Funny Girl on Broadway. Archive footage of Finn Hudson (Cory Monteith) is used in this episode.

== Plot ==
Out-of-town visitors arrive for Rachel Berry's (Lea Michele) official Broadway opening night in Funny Girl, including Will Schuester (Matthew Morrison), Sue Sylvester (Jane Lynch), Santana Lopez (Naya Rivera), and Tina Cohen-Chang (Jenna Ushkowitz). The episode starts off with a nightmare in which Rachel is drastically unprepared for the opening night, then is heckled by her former high school tormentors and supported by her New York friends in a performance of "Lovefool". She falls and is surrounded by everyone, booing her. At breakfast, Kurt Hummel (Chris Colfer) bans her from going on the Internet and reading the negative reviews, taking away her phone until opening night.

At McKinley, Sue asks Will for the extra plane ticket to New York, and her ulterior motive is revealed later on Sue's Corner, in which she has stated she hates New York and Broadway, but now has to visit it as she has never actually been there. She imagines singing "N.Y.C." with Will, and the song ends as both arrive in New York and head off. Tina arrives at Rachel and Kurt's apartment with gifts, where she unintentionally brings up more reasons for Rachel to worry, such as her previous problems with tonsillitis, and also the online hate. Rachel lies that she is fine, and is found by Kurt to secretly watch abusive blogs. She is only motivated to get out of bed when Santana reads her a few horrible comments from the Internet before revealing they were about Barbra Streisand when she first played Fanny in 1964. Meanwhile, Sue shows up to utilize Kurt's room for the night, as the hotel room had one double bed instead of two singles (the ticket being meant for Emma Pillsbury).

It is opening night. Sue is trying to scalp her ticket, before spotting someone trying to do the same before seeing her, and entering the theater. She follows. Will shows up at Rachel's dressing room, where she reveals that she bought a ticket for Finn Hudson, and is nervous of singing "Who Are You Now?" as it always reminded her of him. Will tells her that he's proud of her before Emma calls him from Lima, her water having broke, and he rushes off. The curtain goes up and Rachel performs "I'm the Greatest Star".

During the performance, Sue, sitting next to the New York Times reviewer, constantly complains about the show and leaves, meeting the man previously trying to scalp his ticket, Mario (Chris Parnell), who shares her hatred of Broadway, and asks her to a meal at his restaurant. Her leaving worries the group and Sidney during the interval, the latter impressing on Rachel how even more important it is the second act goes well. Sue and Rachel sing "Who Are You Now?", the former dancing with Mario and the latter on stage. Rachel thinks of Finn during the number and sheds a few tears for him. After the show, which went smoothly, Rachel turns down a satisfied Sidney's invitation to a Broadway cast party, and the seven (Rachel, Blaine, Kurt, Santana, Mercedes, Tina, and Sam) go to a gay bar full of Funny Girl fans, where Rachel performs "Pumping Blood".

In the morning, they return to the apartment, only to find Sue and Mario having been there all night "copulating wildly". Sue begins to tear down Rachel and her performance the previous night, but she stops Santana from a retort, saying that a group of friends joined together and a dream came true last night, a feat which Sue will never accomplish, being a rotten and miserable person. The two adults leave, and Rachel is applauded by her friends. Santana reads the New York Times out loud, and it is positive towards Rachel's performance. Will calls Rachel, saying he's named his newborn Daniel Finn Schuester and that he's completely happy for the first time. Rachel agrees and congratulations are exchanged.

Sue and Mario each try to convince the other to stay in their respective homes, but realize that they cannot be together and share a kiss before Sue gets in a taxi. On Sue's Corner, she states that she still stands by her statements last week—except now she loves New York. She found love there, and believes it quite possible for others to do the same.

== Production ==
The episode was written by co-executive producer Michael Hitchcock, and directed by Eric Stoltz. Production was ongoing in mid-March.

Recurring characters in this episode include aspiring singer Mercedes Jones (Amber Riley), former McKinley students Becky Jackson (Lauren Potter), Jacob Ben Israel (Josh Sussman) and Dave Karofsky (Max Adler), Funny Girl producer Sidney Greene (Michael Lerner), and news anchors Rod Remington (Bill A. Jones) and Andrea (Earlene Davis).

Five songs from the episode are being released on a digital five-track EP with the title Glee: The Music, Opening Night. These are: The Cardigans' "Lovefool" sung by Michele, "I'm the Greatest Star" from Funny Girl performed by Michele, "N.Y.C." from Annie performed by Lynch and Morrison, another Funny Girl song, "Who Are You Now?", performed by Michele and Lynch and NONONO's "Pumpin Blood", performed by Michele, Rivera and Riley.
