= Old Dog, New Tricks =

- Glee episode
- Episode no.: Season 5 Episode 19
- Directed by: Bradley Buecker
- Written by: Chris Colfer
- Production code: 5ARC19
- Original air date: May 6, 2014

Guest appearances
- June Squibb as Maggie Banks; Billy Dee Williams as Andy Collins; Tim Conway as Marty Rogers; Amber Riley as Mercedes Jones; Melinda McGraw as Clara Banks; Sean O'Bryan as Roric; Mia Barron as the mother interested in the three-legged dog; Brittany Renee Finamore as Beverly Stevens

Episode chronology
← Previous "The Back-up Plan"	Next → "The Untitled Rachel Berry Project"
- Glee season 5

"Old Dog, New Tricks" is the nineteenth episode of the fifth season of the American musical television series Glee, and the one-hundred-seventh episode overall. Written by starring actor Chris Colfer and directed by Bradley Buecker, it aired on Fox in the United States on May 6, 2014. The episode featured three special guest stars: June Squibb, Billy Dee Williams, and Tim Conway.

This is the final episode of the series to feature Naya Rivera as a regular cast member, as she would be absent for the season finale and demoted to a recurring status for the final season.

== Plot ==
Kurt Hummel (Chris Colfer), at dinner with his friends, asks them to join him at a matinee on Monday, but all have other plans. Rachel Berry (Lea Michele) discovers that gossip is already flying about her recent absence from Funny Girl, and that the producers are furious. Santana Lopez (Naya Rivera) offers to be Rachel's publicist, and suggests they find a charitable cause; when Rachel sees a woman stuffing her dog into a bag and remonstrates with her for abusing the animal, she realizes she's found her cause.

Kurt is on duty at the Spotlight Diner when an elderly woman asks him to put up a poster for a production of Peter Pan at the Lexington Home for Retired Performers, where she lives. She notices he's feeling down, and offers to listen to his troubles. Afterward, he learns that she is Maggie Banks (June Squibb), a former Broadway star, and she invites him to watch their rehearsals.

At a rescue kennel, Rachel and the others convinces the staff to allow her to stage a benefit. When Kurt finds out, he asks if he can sing at it, but is told no: only Rachel, Mercedes (Amber Riley) and Santana. Rachel's first publicity stunt for the upcoming benefit and her charity "Broadway Bitches", walking dogs for paparazzi, turns into a disaster: the dogs pull her down and drag her for several blocks. Back home, Santana reassures her by describing the next steps in their campaign.

Kurt visits a Peter Pan rehearsal. Shortly after his arrival, the woman playing Peter turns up dead. Kurt offers to play Peter to prevent the production from being cancelled, though they insist he audition first. He later suggests updating the music for the show to make it feel fresh. Maggie receives flowers from her daughter Clara (Melinda McGraw), a high-powered attorney who will be out of town when the show opens, but a nurse reveals to Kurt that Clara does not visit her mother, and the flowers were sent by Maggie herself. Kurt subsequently visits Clara to urge her to come to the show, but finds she is still resentful of having been neglected when younger by her ambitious mother. Kurt later discovers that Rachel and Santana won't be attending the show either, even after he specially asks them, because their benefit is the same day as his performance, even if several hours later.

After Sam Evans (Chord Overstreet) adopts a puppy, names him McConaughey, and brings it back to their apartment despite cogent objections by Mercedes, it gets into everything while he and Artie (Kevin McHale) are playing video games, destroying a number of things including her shoes and hair weave, so she decides the puppy has to be returned. Instead, Sam works with Artie to train McConaughey, which meets with success; ultimately, however, Mercedes convinces Sam that they are both too busy to give a dog the attention it deserves, even as she acknowledges that Sam would be a responsible pet owner.

Rachel sponsors a pet adoption event, but refuses to allow a three-legged dog to be taken home by a departing mother and son before a planned publicity photo later that afternoon; she is denounced as the fraud she is by the irate woman, who recognizes her and knows of her reputation problems.

Blaine (Darren Criss) helps Kurt get ready before the show. Kurt asks Maggie if she will be his substitute family, since his New York friends are so busy; they agree to do be family for each other. He calls Rachel to wish her well on her benefit, but it turns out she is there at the performance, along with Sam and Artie. It goes well, and Clara arrives in time to see one of the new production numbers, "Lucky Star". Afterwards, Maggie and Clara reconcile, and Rachel reveals that she's arranged for the Peter Pan cast to come to the benefit that evening at the Spotlight Diner. The event, featuring New and Old Broadway, is a success, and many dogs are adopted, including the three-legged one and McConaughey.

== Production ==
The episode was written by Glee star Colfer. It was initially reported that he would be writing an episode on March 17, 2014, and shortly thereafter he said in an interview that it would be the nineteenth episode of the season. The episode's director was executive producer Bradley Buecker, and the first day of shooting was on April 4, 2014.

Colfer had been asked to write the episode, and had not expected the offer. He noted that he was given a great deal of latitude in writing his script; his only restrictions were that he "couldn't break up with Blaine and [he] couldn't kill anyone." He was also allowed to select the three songs used for his character Kurt's storyline; the other two songs were selected by the rest of the show's writers.

Colfer said that he was aiming for a "classic Glee" feel, and "wanted to do a story about underdogs"; as his "two favorite things in life are animals and old people", he made sure to include both in the script's storyline. Castmate Michele asked Colfer if he could give her character Rachel a cold and have her "in pajamas the entire episode"; instead, he gave her a storyline that "involves puppies".

The episode featured three special guest stars, all residents of the assisted living facility putting on Peter Pan: June Squibb, Tim Conway and Billy Dee Williams. In addition, one recurring guest star appeared in the episode: aspiring singer Mercedes Jones (Amber Riley).

Five songs from the episode are being released on a digital five-track EP with the title Glee: The Music, Old Dog, New Tricks. These are: Modern English's "I Melt with You", Warren Zevon's "Werewolves of London", and three songs featuring guest star June Squibb: "Memory" from the musical Cats, Madonna's "Lucky Star" with Colfer, and Eddie Money's "Take Me Home Tonight".

== Reception ==
The episode received mixed reviews. Brandon Nowalk of The A.V. Club gave it a D+; the site later included it on a list of the worst 26 episodes of the 2013–14 television season, and said that Colfer had written "one of Glee's most incoherent and vapid episodes, in a season full of incoherence and vapidity." Jodi Walker of Entertainment Weekly had a mostly positive review and called it "not bad at all for a first-time TV writer". Vulture's Lauren Hoffman described it as "wobbly", and added, "The episode feels labored, in a way many first-time television writers' first-ever efforts often do. But it's an honest first crack at writing for television."
