= Trio (Glee) =

- Glee episode
- Episode no.: Season 5 Episode 10
- Directed by: Ian Brennan
- Written by: Sophia Rivka Rossi
- Production code: 5ARC10
- Original air date: March 4, 2014

Guest appearances
- Demi Lovato as Dani; Jayma Mays as Emma Pillsbury; Dot-Marie Jones as Shannon Beiste; Adam Lambert as Elliott "Starchild" Gilbert; Lauren Potter as Becky Jackson; Alan Heitz as Ronny

Episode chronology
← Previous "Frenemies"	Next → "City of Angels"
- Glee season 5

"Trio" is the tenth episode of the fifth season of the American musical television series Glee, and the ninety-eighth episode overall. It aired on Fox in the United States on March 4, 2014.

== Plot ==
After moving out of the apartment she shared with Santana Lopez (Naya Rivera) and Kurt Hummel (Chris Colfer), Rachel (Lea Michele) is revealed to have moved in with Elliott "Starchild" Gilbert (Adam Lambert), another member of Pamela Lansbury, the band Kurt formed, and the two bond over an impromptu performance of "Barracuda". While working at the Broadway diner, she and Santana attempt to out-sing each other in a rendition of "Gloria", both vying for the approbation of Gilbert; instead, they inadvertently drive him from the band. Kurt, tired of their feuding, reconvenes Elliot and Dani (Demi Lovato) to form a new musical venture, One Three Hill, who perform "The Happening" at their debut; while watching this trio, Rachel and Santana are forced to co-exist peacefully, leading to the beginnings of a reconciliation when Santana points out that they share a hunger for success and a willingness to backstab others, even ostensible friends, to get to the top.

Back home in Lima, Glee club members and good friends Tina (Jenna Ushkowitz), Sam (Chord Overstreet) and Blaine (Darren Criss) plan to spend some special time together before their impending graduation. Blaine brings up the idea of a senior-class lock-in, which is quickly quashed by Sue Sylvester (Jane Lynch); as a result, the trio resolve to stage one of their own, sneaking onto school property overnight. Unexpectedly, Becky (Lauren Potter) happens upon them and forces them to play endless games of Twister in exchange for her silence. While Blaine is occupied pacifying her, Tina and Sam sneak off to make out, acting on their unresolved sexual tension; Blaine freaks out upon discovering them. He later apologizes for his overreaction to the constant changes in his life.

Will Schuester (Matthew Morrison) and Emma Pillsbury (Jayma Mays) become distracted from their teaching jobs when they decide to have a child, up to and including Emma dragging him to the staff restroom during work hours for inopportune attempts at conception. Will, on advice from Sue and Shannon Beiste (Dot-Marie Jones), distracts Emma from the details of fertility, enabling a much more conventional mood. At the end of the episode, as Will packs for Nationals, Emma reveals that she won't be going, as their efforts have been successful.

Finally, Blaine, Sam and Tina - plus Artie (Kevin McHale) - choose and perform as their senior song "Hold On", joined variously by Kurt's new trio, as well as Rachel and Santana in their various isolations.

== Production ==
The episode appears to have been in production by November 25, 2013, when Lea Michele tweeted about working that day with guest star Adam Lambert.

Special guest star Demi Lovato returns as Dani, Santana's girlfriend and Pamela Lansbury bandmember. Other recurring characters in this episode include another bandmember, NYU student Elliott "Starchild" Gilbert (Lambert), McKinley football coach Shannon Beiste (Dot-Marie Jones), cheerleader Becky Jackson (Potter) and guidance counselor Emma Pillsbury (Mays).

Seven songs from the episode are being released as singles. These include Kenny Loggins's "Danny's Song" performed by Morrison and Mays; "Don't You (Forget About Me)" by Simple Minds and "Jumpin' Jumpin'" by Destiny's Child, both performed by Ushkowitz, Overstreet and Criss; Heart's "Barracuda" sung by Michele and Lambert; Laura Branigan's "Gloria" sung by Rivera, Michele and Lambert; "The Happening" by The Supremes, performed by Lovato, Lambert and Chris Colfer; and "Hold On" by Wilson Phillips, featuring Criss, Overstreet, Ushkowitz, Kevin McHale, Colfer, Lovato, Lambert, Rivera and Michele.
