= The Back-up Plan (Glee) =

- Glee episode
- Episode no.: Season 5 Episode 18
- Directed by: Ian Brennan
- Written by: Roberto Aguirre-Sacasa
- Production code: 5ARC18
- Original air date: April 29, 2014

Guest appearances
- Shirley MacLaine as June Dolloway; Amber Riley as Mercedes Jones; Michael Lerner as Sidney Greene; Gary Dourdan as DeShawn; Eric Roberts as the fundraiser coordinator; Jim Rash as Lee Paulblatt; Richard Kind as Mr. Rifkin; Nathan Keyes as Andrew Cosgrove; Philip Pavel as a Fox executive; Geri Jewell as a Fox executive; Nicholas Kadi as Alain Marceau; Ilia Volok as the L.A. taxi driver

Episode chronology
← Previous "Opening Night"	Next → "Old Dog, New Tricks"
- Glee season 5

"The Back-up Plan" is the eighteenth episode of the fifth season of the American musical television series Glee, and the 106th episode overall. Written by Roberto Aguirre-Sacasa and directed by co-creator Ian Brennan, it aired on Fox in the United States on April 29, 2014, and features the introduction of Shirley MacLaine as rich socialite June Dolloway.

== Plot ==
Newly minted Broadway star Rachel Berry (Lea Michele) signs with an agency called the ICA, and meets with her new agent Mr. Rifkin (Richard Kind), who urges her to branch out as much as she can from her leading role as Fanny Brice in Funny Girl. She travels to LA under the guise of being sick to audition for a television pilot, Song of Solomon, against the advice of her roommate Kurt Hummel (Chris Colfer). In California, she auditions with The Rose, and is informed it is not a musical. The audition goes uncomfortably awry, partially due to the unfamiliar galactic jargon. Sidney, the producer of Funny Girl, calls to tell her to be at the theater at 7:30 as her understudy has injured herself. Rachel is horrified to discover the state of the traffic jam her taxi is stuck in. Kurt tells her to tell Sidney the truth, but agrees to help when she points out that her career will be ruined. Santana Lopez (Naya Rivera) suggests an alternative to Kurt's ideas as a distraction, and convinces a furious Sidney to let her temporarily step in as Fanny. Rachel later heartily thanks her with a meal. In a mandatory meeting with a still furious Sidney, he reveals to Rachel that if she missed a show again, she will be fired and he will sue her, rendering her unable to work on Broadway.

Blaine Anderson (Darren Criss) and Kurt prepare for the arrival of wealthy socialite June Dollaway (Shirley MacLaine), for whose opening Kurt has been selected to sing. They perform Story of My Life, impressing June, though she neglects Kurt, seeing only Blaine and inviting him to the Soho Center for Outsiders. Blaine reluctantly attends the party, Kurt maintaining that he's fine. At the Center, June and Blaine duet after the former finds out her stock price is lower than normal to enthusiastic applause. She tells Blaine at a meal of a show she's planning to center around him, and refuses his request that Kurt be in it, going as far as to advise him to break off his engagement and venture out into the world instead of settling down. In the apartment, Blaine apologizes for his absences and shares the show's plans to Kurt, lying that he'd been waiting for the latter's part to be fleshed out.

Mercedes Jones (Amber Riley) meets with Santana, worried about her music deal. She invites Santana to the studio to find some direction in her life. At the studio, they find themselves unable to get warmed up properly and Santana suggests to go out of studio, and they duet in the basement, successfully impressing the producer. Mercedes tries to convince DeShawn to let her duet with Santana, but he points out that an unheard-of partner might damage how well the album sells, and Santana agrees, saying that although she appreciates it, it should be all about Mercedes. She walks out, upset. Later at the Spotlight Diner, Mercedes convinces Santana to sign a contract when Kurt arrives with Rachel's news.

The episode ends with Rachel being contacted by Lee Paulblatt (Jim Rash), the FOX representative, who gives her good news and bad news: she has not been cast in Song of Solomon, but a writer is being sent to New York for a new show.

== Production ==
Guest star Shirley MacLaine debuts this episode in a multi-episode arc as June Dolloway, a rich, "powerful socialite" and major NYADA donor who takes an interest in Blaine and wants to make him "a superstar". Scenes with MacLaine and Criss were shot on location at the Bradbury Building in downtown Los Angeles. This was MacLaine's first time singing a Janis Joplin song.

Jim Rash appears as Fox Television executive Lee Paulblatt, who is amazed by Rachel's talent when he sees her in Funny Girl and wants to cast her.

The episode was written by supervising producer Roberto Aguirre-Sacasa and directed by co-creator Ian Brennan, and was in production on April 9, 2014, when Academy Award-winners MacLaine and Rash were shooting scenes for him. It was produced in parallel with the following episode "Old Dogs New Tricks", which began shooting on April 4, 2014.

Recurring characters appearing in this episode include aspiring singer Mercedes Jones (Riley), Funny Girl producer Sidney Greene (Michael Lerner) and NYADA teacher Alain Marceau (Nicholas Kadi).

Five songs from the episode are being released on a digital five-track EP with the title Glee: The Music, The Back-Up Plan. These are: Avicii's "Wake Me Up" sung by Michele; Lauryn Hill's "Doo Wop (That Thing)" performed by Riley and Rivera; One Direction's "Story of My Life" performed by Criss and Chris Colfer; Big Brother and the Holding Company's "Piece of My Heart" (Janis Joplin sang lead), performed by MacLaine and Criss; and Bette Midler's version of "The Rose" from the movie of the same name, sung by Michele.
