= The Royal Concept =

Swedish indie rock band

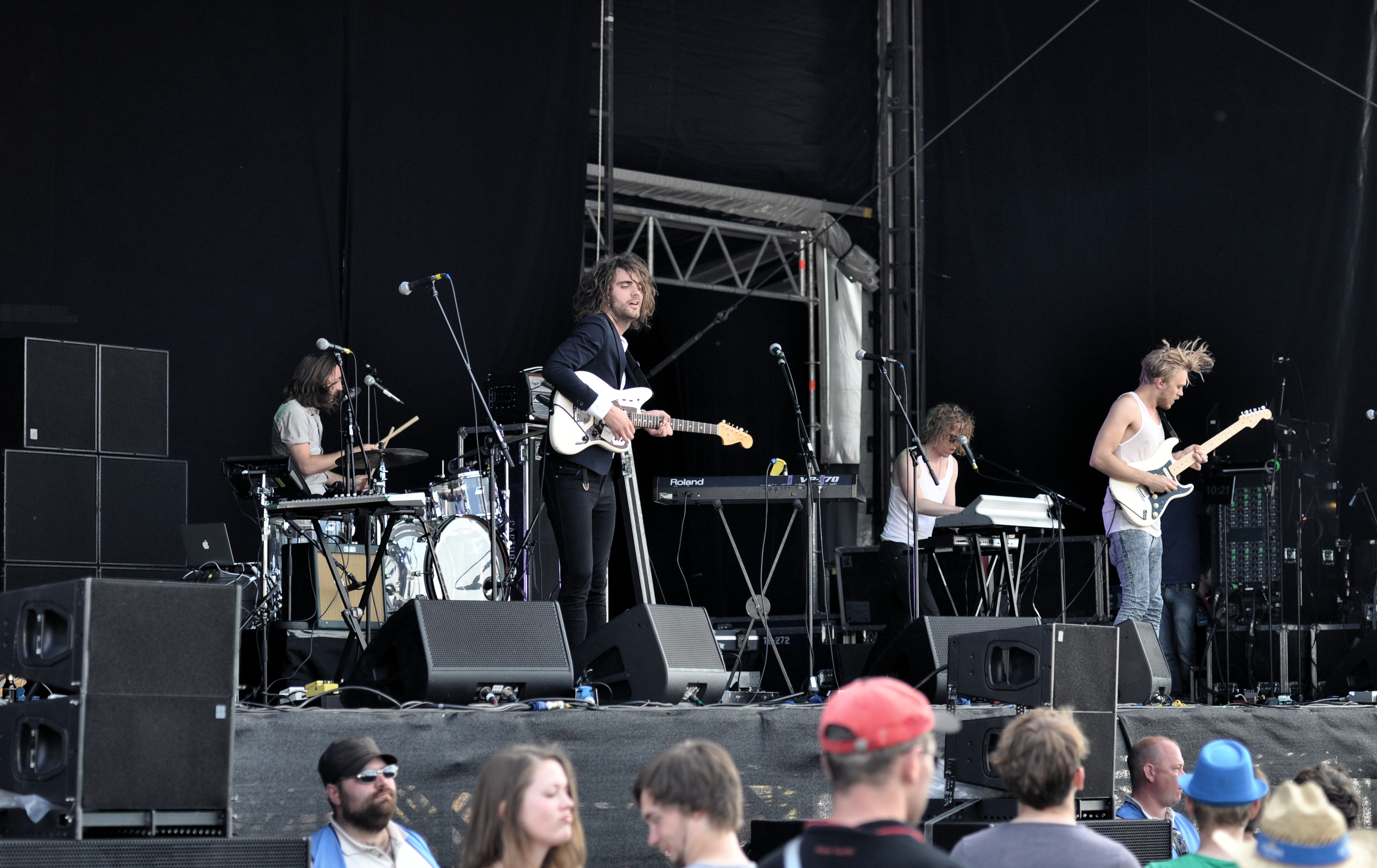
- The Royal Concept performing in 2013

Background information
- Origin: Stockholm, Sweden
- Genres: Alternative rock; indie rock; indie pop; alternative dance; synthpop; dance-pop; pop punk; pop rock; post-punk revival
- Years active: 2010–present
- Labels: Columbia Records, Lava Records, Republic Records
- Members: David Larson; Filip Bekic; Magnus Robert; Povel Olsson
- Past members: Oscar Nilsson
- Website: www.theroyalconcept.com

The Royal Concept is a Swedish rock band founded in Stockholm in 2010. It currently consists of lead vocalist and guitarist David Larson, guitarist Filip Bekic, bassist Magnus Robert, and drummer Povel Olsson.

== Career ==
=== 2010–2012: Early founding ===
Originally billed as Concept store, in 2010 they released their first single, "Damn", which has a mixture of sunny-pop and electronic elements. The band consisted originally of Oscar Nilsson, David Larsson, Filip Bekic and Povel Olsson.

In 2011, the band changed their name to The Concept. Oscar Nilsson left the band and was replaced by bassist Magnus Robert. The same year they released "D-D-Dance" and "Gimme Twice". After getting support from the Swedish national radio channel P3, they soon made an impression on the Swedish live music scene, peaking in the summer of 2011 at the Peace & Love festival.

In early 2012, the band changed its name to The Royal Concept, signing to Lava Records and releasing their self-titled EP in June. They also released their tracks "World on Fire" and "Naked and Dumb", followed by a fall tour in the US opening for The Wombats, then Wolf Gang before returning to Sweden to finish recording their studio album. Their single "Goldrushed" was included in the soundtrack of FIFA 13, and also in NASCAR The Game: Inside Line(along with "In The End"), while "World on Fire" was featured on the soundtrack of MLB 13: The Show.

=== 2013: Goldrushed ===
In 2013, the band released the single "On Our Way", and announced the title of their debut album, Goldrushed, which was released in Sweden on September 11, 2013. That fall the band toured with American Authors and Misterwives around North America. In addition the band also released an exclusive song on Spotify, "27 Forever". In spring 2014 the band went on tour with Switchfoot. In April 2014, the band announced the release date (May 7, 2014) of their debut album "Goldrushed" in Japan, which features five bonus tracks (Damn, Naked & Dumb, Gimme Twice, Knocked Up, and Someday). "On Our Way" is one of the songs featured in EA Sports's football game FIFA 14, and has been one of the players' most favourite songs. It was also covered by the cast of Glee in the Season 5 episode "The End of Twerk" and was also used several episodes of MTV series Big Tips Texas, Generation Cryo and Catfish: The TV Show.

=== 2015–2018: Smile ===
The Royal Concept's second release was August 21, 2015, with the album Smile. "Smile" was featured in the game FIFA 16. "Fashion" was featured in the television program iZombie. The band toured in North American supporting the album.

After the release and publicity of Smile, members of the band decided to disband for a short time before joining back together and releasing an EP, The Wake Up, in September 2018 while on a tour of Asia.

=== 2019: The Man Without Qualities ===
On May 24, 2019, TRC released The Man Without Qualities, their first release since breaking from Republic Records. The album was described as more mature than the band's previous releases, with a little bit of carryover but with more climaxes and emotion as well as showing more of a psychedelic side of their sound. The band originally planned for The Man Without Qualities to be their last album, but after exiting the bureaucratic world of major music labels, a newfound vibe pushed them forward, and worked with Chris Seefried to produce the album. The Royal Concept toured China before the album's release and subsequently announced a tour in Japan, Sweden and Spain.

== Band members ==
Current members

- David Larson - lead vocals, guitar, piano, keyboards, synthesizers (2010–present)
- Filip Bekic - lead guitar, backing vocals (2010–present)
- Magnus Robert - bass, backing vocals (2011–present)
- Povel Olsson - drums, percussion, backing vocals (2010–present)

Past members

- Oscar Nilsson- Lead vocals (2010-2011)

Touring members

- Jonatan Larson - David's younger brother, additional live musician.

== Discography ==
Studio albums

- 2013: Goldrushed (Swedish Release)
  - 1. "World On Fire"
  - 2. "On Our Way"
  - 3. "D-D-Dance"
  - 4. "Radio"
  - 5. "Cabin Down Below (feat. Kenny G)"
  - 6. "In the End"
  - 7. "Busy Busy"
  - 8. "Girls Girls Girls"
  - 9. "Shut the World"
  - 10. "Tonight"
  - 11. "Goldrushed"
  - 12. "Damn!" (Swedish Bonus Track)
  - 13. "27 Forever" (Exclusive Spotify Track)
- 2014: Goldrushed (Japanese Release)
  - 1. "World On Fire"
  - 2. "On Our Way"
  - 3. "D-D-Dance"
  - 4. "Radio"
  - 5. "Cabin Down Below (feat. Kenny G)"
  - 6. "In the End"
  - 7. "Busy Busy"
  - 8. "Girls Girls Girls"
  - 9. "Shut the World"
  - 10. "Tonight"
  - 11. "Goldrushed"
  - 12. "Damn!"
  - 13. "Naked & Dumb"
  - 14. "Gimme Twice"
  - 15. "Knocked Up"
  - 16. "Someday"
- 2019: The Man Without Qualities
  - 1. "The Wake Up"
  - 2. "The Man Without Qualities"
  - 3. "Wild Things"
  - 4. "Need To Know"
  - 5. "Why Why Not"
  - 6. "Kick It"
  - 7. "Silver Lining"
  - 8. "Up All Night"

Extended plays (EPs)

- 2012: The Royal Concept
  - 1. Gimme Twice
  - 2. Goldrushed
  - 3. Knocked up
  - 4. D-D-Dance
  - 5. In The End
- 2013: Royal
  - 1. World On Fire
  - 2. On Our Way
  - 3. Gimme Twice
  - 4. Radio
  - 5. Shut The World
  - 6. Goldrushed
- 2015: Smile
  - 1. "Smile"
  - 2. "Fashion"
  - 3. "Higher Than Love"
  - 4. "Hurricane"
  - 5. "Just Wanna Be Loved By U"
- 2018: The Wake Up (Asia Release)
  - 1. "Wild Things"
  - 2. "Need To Know"
  - 3. "Kick It"
  - 4. "Up All Night"

Singles

- 2010: "Damn!"
- 2011: "D-D-Dance"
- 2011: "Gimme Twice" #35 Billboard Alternative Songs
- 2012: "World on Fire"
- 2012: "Naked & Dumb"
- 2012: "Lost in You"
- 2013: "On Our Way"
- 2019: "Need To Know"
- 2019: "Up All Night"
- 2019: "Kick It"
