= The Untitled Rachel Berry Project =

- Glee episode
- Episode no.: Season 5 Episode 20
- Directed by: Brad Falchuk
- Written by: Matthew Hodgson
- Production code: 5ARC20
- Original air date: May 13, 2014

Guest appearances
- Shirley MacLaine as June Dolloway; Kristen Schaal as Mary Halloran; Amber Riley as Mercedes Jones; Heather Morris as Brittany Pierce; Beau Garrett as Charlie Darlene; Max Emerson as a male model

Episode chronology
← Previous "Old Dog New Tricks"	Next → "Loser like Me"
- Glee season 5

"The Untitled Rachel Berry Project" is the twentieth episode and season finale of the fifth season of the American musical television series Glee, and the 108th episode overall. Written by Matthew Hodgson and directed by co-creator Brad Falchuk, it aired on Fox in the United States on May 13, 2014, and features the return of special guest star Shirley MacLaine as rich socialite June Dolloway in her second and last appearance.

== Plot ==
The regular Monday-night dinner is being held at Rachel Berry (Lea Michele) and Kurt Hummel's (Chris Colfer) apartment, and Brittany Pierce (Heather Morris) shows up unexpectedly. To her disappointment, Santana Lopez (Naya Rivera) is not there—she is in Iowa shooting a commercial—and then a second, expected visitor arrives: famed screenwriter Mary Halloran (Kristen Schaal), who has been sent by the network to create a television script for Rachel to star in. The two of them later meet, and Rachel is clearly nonplussed by Mary's ideas and idiosyncratic behavior.

Mercedes Jones (Amber Riley) kicks off a nationwide shopping mall concert tour in New York; her label has added Brittany as her star backup dancer, with Santana set to join them in Reno. Her boyfriend Sam Evans (Chord Overstreet) is chosen as the new underwear model for a major ad campaign. With Mercedes leaving, their friends separately urge them to break off their relationship, as they feel the strains of being apart yet faithful will be unfair to Sam, who is already struggling with abstinence. Despite the advice, both Mercedes and Sam decide to continue as a couple.

Blaine Anderson (Darren Criss) meets with wealthy socialite June Dolloway (Shirley MacLaine) in advance of their NYADA showcase; he makes one more attempt to add Kurt to the event, and she is unequivocal: she will drop her sponsorship if he tries. When Kurt arrives after she leaves, Blaine confesses that Kurt is not actually in the show, but he had been hoping to convince June to include him. Kurt is furious that Blaine has again lied to him, and storms out. Later, the two reconcile: Blaine is no longer eager to do the showcase since Kurt is not welcome to perform in it, and Kurt acknowledges that they will invariably hurt one another even though they are together and their love is real, and urges him to shine at the event.

The friends gather to read Mary's script: with the exception of Brittany, they think it is terrible. Later, Rachel meets with Mary and tells her that the lead character does not sound like her. Mary points out that television viewers want anti-heroes, but Rachel responds by singing, and Mary, uncharacteristically, is moved and made happy by the performance. She agrees to redo the script, but warns Rachel that the network will never make a pilot from it.

At Sam's model shoot, the "sex buzz" present during his audition is gone. The photographer who cast him clears the room, tells him that no one will know what happens there, and kisses him. When he returns to the apartment, he confesses to Mercedes that he cheated, though it was only the one kiss, and he burst into tears. Mercedes admits that she may not be ready for years, which she feels is unfair to Sam, so though they love each other, they ultimately decide to formally end their relationship, which could nevertheless resume whenever Mercedes feels ready.

The NYADA showcase June presents for Blaine is a big success, and he and June end with a duet. He is called back to do an encore, and telling the audience that to know him means knowing the love of his life, asks Kurt to join him. June looks angry for much of the song, but her expression softens, and she joins in the dance at the end, and tells Blaine she was wrong.

The assembled friends read Mary's new script, and they all love it except for Brittany. A bus stops outside the apartment with Sam's ad featured on the outside, and though Artie Abrams (Kevin McHale) congratulates him on the start of a big career, Sam says it is the finish: he is moving back to Lima where things are slower—everyone is scattering anyway. The final song shows them doing just that: Mercedes and Brittany leave for their tour, Blaine moves back in with Kurt and Rachel, Artie is busy at film school, and Sam is seen back at McKinley, looking in on the computer lab that has taken over the choir room. As the episode ends, Rachel gets a call from the network: they want her to film the pilot.

== Production ==
Production of the episode began in mid-April, and included a Saturday shoot on April 26, 2014. Michele recorded her final song of the season, "Glitter in the Air"—which co-creators Ryan Murphy and Brad Falchuk allowed her to select—on April 16, and filmed it on April 29. Filming for the episode and season ended on May 2, 2014, eleven days before the episode aired on May 13 as the season's finale.

According to Murphy, the events of the episode, including to the two current New York couples Kurt and Blaine, and Mercedes and Sam—"something big happens"—will set up the sixth and final season of the show. Chris Colfer, who plays Kurt Hummel, said that the season "has a really nice conclusion" and that "every character gets a good send-off".

Special guest star Shirley MacLaine returns as socialite June Dolloway. Other recurring characters appearing in this episode include McKinley High alumnae Mercedes Jones (Riley) and Brittany Pierce (Heather Morris). One character that does not appear is the character coupled with Brittany, Santana Lopez, played by cast regular Naya Rivera. Although originally set to be in the episode, Santana was later written out.

Seven songs from the episode are being released on a digital seven-track EP with the title Glee: The Music, The Untitled Rachel Berry Project. These include the original song "Shakin' My Head" sung by Riley, John Legend's "All of Me" sung by Criss, Duran Duran's "Girls on Film" sung by Overstreet featuring Beau Garrett, Pink's "Glitter in the Air" sung by Michele, "No Time at All" from Pippin performed by MacLaine and Criss, Estelle's (feat. Kanye West) "American Boy" sung by Criss and Colfer, and Bastille's "Pompeii" performed by Michele, Colfer, Overstreet, Riley, Criss, Morris, and Kevin McHale.

== Reception ==
The episode was watched by 1.87 million American viewers, and attained an 18–49 rating/share of 0.6/2. This marks a decrease in ratings from the previous episode, and a sharp decline from the fourth season finale. The show placed fifth in its timeslot (with NCIS placing first) and fourteenth for the night. Including DVR viewership, the episode attained an overall 18-49 rating of 1.2, down slightly from the previous episode that attained an overall 18-49 rating (including DVR viewership) of 1.3. This is the least watched finale throughout the show's run.
