= Tested (Glee) =

- Glee episode
- Episode no.: Season 5 Episode 16
- Directed by: Paul McCrane
- Written by: Russel Friend; Garrett Lerner
- Production code: 5ARC16
- Original air date: April 15, 2014

Guest appearances
- Amber Riley as Mercedes Jones; Stephanie Hunt as Julie; Rick Worthy as the STD clinic doctor; Bruce Beatty as the church pastor; Galadriel Stineman as Vanessa; Tahlena Chikami as Jessica

Episode chronology
← Previous "Bash"	Next → "Opening Night"
- Glee season 5

"Tested" is the sixteenth episode of the fifth season of the American musical television series Glee, and the 104th episode overall. Written by Russel Friend and Garrett Lerner, and directed by Paul McCrane, it aired on Fox in the United States on April 15, 2014.

== Plot ==
Artie Abrams (Kevin McHale) tests positive for chlamydia and is forced to tell all his sexual partners. While on a date, he grows very nervous and tells his girlfriend, Julie that he does not want to have sex for at least seven to 10 days — when he is to find out if the antibiotics worked. Later, Artie confesses to her about his STD; but she is more angry at the fact that he slept with two "idiots," and then calls him a creeper before leaving him.

Blaine Anderson (Darren Criss) and Kurt Hummel (Chris Colfer) begin to distance from each other when Kurt begins exercising more and Blaine begins feeling insecure, especially when he begins to eat more. Kurt soon finds out that Blaine is frequenting a web site called "Frat Boi Physicals", and grows angry about that. The next day at fencing class, the two sing "Love is a Battlefield" before Kurt angrily fights him. Later, Blaine confesses that he is beginning to feel insecure now that Kurt is changing in his physique and personality; Kurt then assures him that he will always be with him, and tells him that they have to be honest with each other.

Mercedes Jones (Amber Riley) questions whether she wants to lose her virginity to Sam Evans (Chord Overstreet). Mercedes goes to church praying for guidance, and concludes that she wants to wait until marriage. This complicates things for Sam; he later fills Mercedes's living room with candles, saying that he can live without sex, but not live without her.

Throughout the episode, Mercedes confides in Rachel Berry (Lea Michele) about sex, with her saying that she and Finn Hudson (Cory Monteith) loved each other very much when she had her first time. Later, Mercedes asks her if she will begin dating again; and she responds by saying that she is still waiting to be ready.

== Production ==
The episode was written by the executive producer team of Russel Friend and Garrett Lerner, and directed by Paul McCrane.

Only one recurring character appeared in the episode: aspiring singer Mercedes Jones (Amber Riley).

Four songs from the episode have been released on a digital four-track EP with the title Glee: The Music, Tested. These are: Robert Palmer's "Addicted to Love" sung by McHale, Foreigner's "I Want to Know What Love Is" sung by Riley, Pat Benatar's "Love Is a Battlefield" performed by Colfer and Criss, and Janet Jackson's "Let's Wait Awhile" performed by McHale, Riley and Overstreet.
