= Bash (Glee) =

- Glee episode
- Episode no.: Season 5 Episode 15
- Directed by: Brad Buecker
- Written by: Ian Brennan
- Production code: 5ARC15
- Original air date: April 8, 2014

Guest appearances
- Whoopi Goldberg as Carmen Tibideaux; Amber Riley as Mercedes Jones; Mike O'Malley as Burt Hummel; Michael Lerner as Sidney Greene; Dana Davis as Tesla; Ashley Blaine Featherson as Shaynice; Assaf Cohen as Kurt's doctor

Episode chronology
← Previous "New New York"	Next → "Tested"
- Glee season 5

"Bash" is the fifteenth episode of the fifth season of the American musical television series Glee, and the 103rd episode overall. Written by Ian Brennan and directed by Brad Buecker, it aired on Fox in the United States on April 8, 2014. Special guest star Whoopi Goldberg returns as NYADA dean Carmen Tibideaux, and the episode features several songs by Broadway composer Stephen Sondheim.

== Synopsis ==
Kurt Hummel (Chris Colfer) is attacked in a gay-bashing incident after having a fight with Rachel. Rachel Berry (Lea Michele) continues her journey toward her Broadway debut in Funny Girl and decides that NYADA is holding her back and quits college. She, Kurt, and Blaine Anderson (Darren Criss) perform at NYADA.

== Production ==
The episode features several songs by Broadway composer and lyricist Stephen Sondheim. A number of these were filmed on location in the Walt Disney Concert Hall building, which is used for the NYADA Round Room concert hall.

Special guest star Whoopi Goldberg returns as NYADA dean Carmen Tibideaux. Recurring characters appearing in this episode include aspiring singer Mercedes Jones (Amber Riley), Kurt's father Burt Hummel (Mike O'Malley) and Funny Girl producer Sidney Greene (Michael Lerner).

Six songs from the episode are being released on a six-track EP with the title Glee: The Music, Bash. These include an original song, "Colorblind", performed by Riley; Aretha Franklin's "(You Make Me Feel Like) A Natural Woman," also performed by Riley; and four Sondheim songs: "Broadway Baby" from Follies, performed by Michele and Criss; "No One Is Alone" from Into the Woods sung by Michele, Criss and Colfer; "Not While I'm Around" from Sweeney Todd: The Demon Barber of Fleet Street sung by Criss, Michele, Riley and Chord Overstreet (although Criss performs the song as a solo in the episode); and "I'm Still Here" from Follies, performed by Colfer.
