= Glee: The Music, The Christmas Album Volume 4 =

Glee: The Music, The Christmas Album, Volume 4

EP by Glee Cast
- Released: December 3, 2013
- Recorded: 2009–2013
- Genre: Pop
- Label: Columbia; 20th Century Fox TV

Glee Cast chronology
The Quarterback (Music From the TV Series) (2013)	Glee: The Music, The Christmas Album, Volume 4 (2013)	Glee: The Music, The Complete Season Four

Glee: The Music, The Christmas Album, Volume 4 is the seventh and final extended play (EP) by the cast of the American musical television series Glee. It features six songs from the fifth season. It was released on December 3, 2013.

== Track listing ==
No.	Title	Original artist	Length
1.	"Here Comes Santa Claus (Right Down Santa Claus Lane)"	Bing Crosby and The Andrews Sisters	2:41
2.	"Rockin' Around the Christmas Tree"	Brenda Lee	2:18
3.	"Mary's Little Boy Child"	Boney M.	3:52
4.	"The Chipmunk Song (Christmas Don't Be Late)"	The Chipmunks and David Seville	2:12
5.	"Love Child"	Diana Ross & the Supremes	3:06
6.	"Away in a Manger"	Nat King Cole	1:55
Total length:			16:04

Glee: The Music, The Christmas Album Volume 4 – Japanese edition
No.	Title	Original artist	Length
7.	"The Rose"	Bette Midler	3:32
Total length:			19:36
