= Unique (Glee) =

Fictional character from the Fox series Glee

Unique Adams
- Glee character
- Alex Newell as Unique in Glee
- First appearance: "Saturday Night Glee-ver" (2012)
- Last appearance: "Dreams Come True" (2015)
- Created by: Ryan Murphy; Brad Falchuk; Ian Brennan
- Portrayed by: Alex Newell

In-universe information
- Occupation: High school student (graduated)

Unique Adams is a fictional character from the Fox musical comedy-drama series Glee who first appeared in "Saturday Night Glee-ver", the sixteenth episode of the show's third season. Portrayed by actor Alex Newell, Unique is notable for being the show's first transgender character. Introduced as shy teen boy Wade Adams, the character is the featured vocalist of New Directions' rival group Vocal Adrenaline, and while doing so realizes she is a trans woman, taking on the moniker "Unique" and finding the courage to perform as a woman. She later transfers to William McKinley High School at the beginning of the fourth season in order to be in a place where she can be her true self.

Unique was initially created as a two-episode guest arc prize in Glee's third season for Newell, one of the two runners-up of the first season of Oxygen's The Glee Project. After the well received appearance, Unique returns for a recurring role for the fourth season and is later promoted to the main cast for the fifth season, although she was written out mid season. She returns for two appearances in the final season, including the series finale. For the depiction of coming to terms with her identity throughout her appearance on the show, the character has received favorable reviews and is considered to be the most notable mid-run addition to the show.

== Storylines ==
=== Season 3 ===
The character makes her debut in the third-season episode "Saturday Night Glee-ver" as a teenage boy named Wade, a student at Carmel High School, and the new Vocal Adrenaline lead vocal, who idolizes both Mercedes Jones (Amber Riley) and Kurt Hummel (Chris Colfer) and comes to them for advice, despite being a competition rival. Wade is a young trans woman, not out yet who wants to perform in competition as a woman but lacks the confidence and is constantly pressured by Vocal Adrenaline's director Jesse St. James (Jonathan Groff). Mercedes and Kurt, under Sue Sylvester's (Jane Lynch) order, advise her to do so in order to sabotage the group. Mercedes and Kurt have a change of heart and when they are about to retract their advice, Unique turns out to be a huge success. During the Nationals, Unique pressed by the new publicity and pressure, considers backing down. Only after the encouragement from Kurt and Mercedes, she performs and received the MVP award at Nationals competition, not before telling the two that she might transfer school next year.

=== Season 4 ===
Unique transfers to McKinley and as the latest Nationals MVP last year, joins New Directions straight away without audition, which garnered less than enthusiastic welcome from seniors Tina Cohen-Chang (Jenna Ushkowitz), Blaine Anderson (Darren Criss), and Brittany Pierce (Heather Morris), as they are secretly competing for "The New Rachel" position in the group. Fiercely, she declares that she's in for the competition. The club, being at its peak popularity after the Nationals victory, forbids Unique to dress as a female at the beginning. They later allows her to do so offscreen and apologizes to Marley Rose (Melissa Benoist) for their behavior. The club's full acceptance of Unique and Marley effectively cuts the tie between them and the popular mean kids, led by new cheerleader Kitty Wilde (Becca Tobin). Unique strikes up a friendship with Marley and auditions for the school's production of Grease together, where she auditions as Rizzo. Sue is adamant because Unique is transgender, but director and New Directions alum Finn Hudson (Cory Monteith) insists that she is the right fit and gives her the role. Sue retaliates by calling Unique's parents and force her to pull out from the play because her parents are concerned about her safety, which disappoints her deeply. When the alumni return during Thanksgiving for Sectionals to coach the new members, she is delightfully partnered with Mercedes. Later in the season, she confronts Ryder Lynn (Blake Jenner) about kissing Marley, who is dating Jake Puckerman (Jacob Artist). This only ignites a feud with Ryder, because he calls her a "dude" and refuses to acknowledge her as a girl. He later apologizes to the three. In the season finale, Ryder confronts the club about who is catfishing him. After Marley covers for her, Unique finally admits that she is the catfish and that she has a crush on him. The exchange wasn't meant to be that serious at first but it got way too deep for her to stop. Ryder, furious, tells her that he won't ever speak to her again and announces that he is quitting New Directions after Regionals. After the victory, overjoyed with happiness, the two share a hug, only to awkwardly stop seconds later.

=== Season 5 ===
Aside from a small remark from Kitty, there's no resolution on the catfish storyline cliffhanger, as Ryder is unexplainably still in the club. Unique goes to the female bathroom during class so no one would notice, but is caught by Bree (Erinn Westbrook), who promises not to tell anyone so she herself can start to use the boys bathroom to make out with Jake, creating "The Great McKinley Bathroom Gender Riot". When she goes to the men's bathroom, she is harassed by three jocks who pick on her and throw her wig. The current principal Sue creates a porta potty with a question mark for her, but Will Schuester (Matthew Morrison) secretly takes her to the teachers bathroom. Will decides to end the week's twerking lesson in exchange for Sue's granting Unique the access to the teachers bathroom. She congratulates Mercedes on her upcoming album and last appear in the season when Sue disbands the glee club because they did not win Nationals, where she shares one last group hug with Marley, Jake, Ryder, and Kitty before attending the senior class graduation.

=== Season 6 ===
Sue transferred her to another school after the glee club is disbanded. Her whereabouts during the season remain unknown. In “The Hurt Locker, Part Two”, Rachel Berry (Lea Michele) –unable to remember her name– refers her as “cross-dressing Mercedes”, and Kitty mentions that other old members stopped talking to her once they got transferred. She returns to the show in the "Transitioning" episode, having been summoned by Will, now the coach of Vocal Adrenaline, to teach the Vocal Adrenaline kids about tolerance, to no avail. She comes back to McKinley to console Coach Beiste (Dot-Marie Jones) after the latter's transition to a man, and gathered a transgender choir to perform for Beiste to help Will's act of intervention on Vocal Adrenaline kids after they vandalized Beiste's car. She last appears in the closing minutes of the series finale and takes a bow with the rest of the Glee cast.

== Development ==
Newell, along with Lindsay Pearce, was the co-runner ups of the first season of The Glee Project, which granted both a two-episode arc on the parent series. Their character, first introduced as Wade Adams, debuted on the show in the third season episode "Saturday Night Glee-ver" as the Vocal Adrenaline's new lead singer. Ryan Murphy described the character to be "going to be the love child of Kurt and Mercedes and will turn to them for much advice." The shy Wade expressed her female identity through music as the bold, brave alter ego, Unique. Newell was called back for the show's fourth season as a recurring cast. They were eventually promoted to the main cast for the fifth season.

== Musical performances ==
Erin Strecker of Entertainment Weekly gave an "A" grade to Unique's debut performance of "Boogie Shoes" by KC and the Sunshine Band in the episode "Saturday Night Glee-ver" and wrote "Unique, welcome to the show! New Directions, the (disco) ball is in your court after this showstopping, powerhouse performance." In a recap of fourth season episode "The Role You Were Born to Play", Strecker gave Unique and Marley Rose's performance of Pink's "Blow Me (One Last Kiss)" an A− and wrote "Marley and Wade rock out both in the hallways and onstage for their audition (Side note: This is a horrible choice for an audition song). I really dug the harmonies on this, and the word changes (“whiskey wish”!?) made me chuckle."

Lincee Ray from Entertainment Weekly wrote that "I believe this is her best performance on Glee. It was powerful, emotional, and even though I wasn't crazy about that ending note, I thought the performance was nearly flawless." regarding Unique's performance of "I Know Where I've Been" in the sixth season episode "Transitioning"

== Reception ==
The character broke ground by being one of the most visible transgender characters on television and one of the first on a network prime time show. Newell's performance as Unique was described as "bold", with "remarkable restraint and powerful vocals."

Her initial appearance and storylines with Kurt and Mercedes was highlighted as a step forward for the show towards trans representation, a first for the series. Jacob Severn from Pop Crush noted that Kurt's advice for Wade not to be Unique on stage as an evidence that he does not understand what trans people go through. he wrote "It's about time 'Glee' tackled some of these issues, and we really hope to see more of Unique in the future. Not just for her powerful singing voice and fabulous dancing, but in order to bring trans issues to light. This looks like the next step of acceptance in 'Glee.'"

Regarding the storyline in which she has a feud with Ryder due to the latter's refusal to acknowledge her as a girl, Brandon Nowalk from The AV Club wrote "Now, I wouldn't mind a plot where minorityhood is more than victimization, but Unique is Glee's first close-up on transgendered [sic] living, and that 'What bathroom do you use' smirk should be called out for the juvenile self-absorption it is with all the sincerity this do-gooder can muster." Marc Snetiker from Entertainment Weekly lauded Newell's performance as Unique in the fifth-season episode "The End of Twerk", highlighting Unique's rendition of Beyoncé's "If I Were a Boy", noting "I'm surprised it's taken this long since Unique's introduction for us to get this song and this performance, actually. In a ridiculous episode, the song was particularly moving, and should serve as a reminder of Glee's important position as a sociopolitical talking point for teens across the country."
