= Erinn Westbrook =

American actress

- Born: New York, New York, U.S.
- Education: Harvard University
- Occupations: Actress, model, singer and dancer
- Years active: 2011–present
- Children: 1

Erinn Westbrook is an American actress, singer, dancer and model. She is known for portraying Bree in Glee, Gabby Richards in the MTV series Awkward, and Magnolia Barnard in the Netflix series Insatiable. From 2021-2023, she starred as Tabitha Tate in The CW series Riverdale.

== Early and personal life ==
Westbrook was born in New York, New York, and moved to Town and Country, Missouri, when she was six years old. She is the second of three children. She has an elder sister, Lauren and a younger brother, Brent C. Both of her siblings are also Harvard graduates. She attended John Burroughs School, where she was the captain of the cheerleading squad and graduated in 2006.

She graduated from Harvard University, the tenth member of her family to do so. She majored in English, American Literature and Language, with a secondary concentration in Dramatic Arts and an advanced certification in Spanish. She wrote for the Harvard Crimson and was president of Students Taking on Poverty.

== Career ==
After interning for CNBC, NBC, and Oxygen, Westbrook began her career as an on-air personality for MTV. She reported on topics pertinent to young people and hosted several features, including SXSW, mtvU's Movers & Changers, a joint venture between the network and the New York Stock Exchange, and MTV Spring Break. Westbrook served as one of the main hosts of MTV Spring Break 2010, 2011, and 2012. In 2012, Westbrook landed a recurring role on Mr. Box Office, starring alongside Bill Bellamy, Vivica Fox, and Jon Lovitz. She also choreographed two episodes in 2013.

Westbrook began her career in Los Angeles as a model with Ford Models, appearing in ads for Nike, Vineyard Vines, Seventeen magazine, Cosmopolitan magazine, and others. In fall 2013, Westbrook was featured as one of "Fashion's Next It Girls" in Hollywood by Who, What, Wear. Westbrook has guest-starred on Switched at Birth, Supernatural, Bones, NCIS and most recently, Jane the Virgin. She is best known for her role as Bree, the captain of the Cheerios, in the fifth season of Glee. In spring 2014, Westbrook joined the cast of MTV's drama, Awkward, and continued with the show through the fifth and final season in 2016. In summer 2014, Westbrook was invited by the U.S. embassies in Singapore, Malaysia, and Indonesia to visit Southeast Asia as an emissary of Culture and the Arts.

== Filmography ==
Film
Year	Title	Role	Notes
2012	The Debut	Sofia Cross	Short Film
2013	In a World...	Reality Girl #3	
2016	72 Hours: A Brooklyn Love Story?	Jazz	
2021	7th & Union	Marie Taylor	

Television
Year	Title	Role	Notes
2009–2011	Movers & Changers	Herself/host	12 episodes
2011	1000 Ways to Die	Angela	Episode: "Wait, Don't Tell Me - You're Dead"
2012	Switched at Birth	Jessica	Episode: "Expulsion from the Garden of Eden"
2012–2013	Mr. Box Office	Danielle	22 episodes
2013	Dog with a Blog	Remy	Episode: "Guess Who's a Cheerleader"
2013	Twisted	Sydney	Episode: "Out with the In-Crowd"
2013	See Dad Run	Meredith	2 episodes
2013	Glee	Bree	7 episodes; also performer
2014	Supernatural	Tamara	Episode: "Bloodlines"
2014	Bones	Brenda	Episode: "The Purging of the Pundit"
2014–2016	Awkward	Gabby Richards	17 episodes
2015	Constantine	Lily	Episode: "A Whole World Out There"
2015	Stitchers	Nikki Fox	Episode: "Finally"
2015	NCIS	Hanna Friedgen	Episode: "Day In Court"
2016	Jane the Virgin	Natalie Tanner	2 episodes
2016	The Night Shift	Kelly Anne	Episode: "Get Busy Livin'"
2016	How To Be A Vampire	Klara	5 episodes
2017	Love on the Vines	Liz Preston	TV movie
2017	Life After First Failure	Mandi-Ann Deandre	3 episodes
2017	The Tap	Gloria Murphy	USA Network pilot
2018–2019	Insatiable	Magnolia Barnard	Main role; 19 episodes
2018	Legacies	Cassie	Episode: "Death Keeps Knocking on My Door"
2019	The Resident	Adaku Eze	7 episodes
2021–2023	Riverdale	Tabitha Tate / Tammy Tate / Tina Tate / Teresa Tate / Tessa Tate	Main role (season 5–7), special guest star (season 7); 40 episodes
2021	Advice By Love	Kendall Turner	TV movie
2024	Station 19	Lacy	1 episode
