= Glee: The Music – Celebrating 100 Episodes =

Soundtrack album by Glee cast
- Released: March 18, 2014
- Recorded: 2014
- Genre: Soundtrack
- Length: 48:22
- Labels: Columbia; Fox Music
- Producers: Adam Anders; Peer Åström; Ryan Murphy

Glee cast chronology
Glee: The Music, City of Angels (2014)	Glee: The Music – Celebrating 100 Episodes (2014)	Glee: The Music, New New York (2014)

Glee: The Music – Celebrating 100 Episodes is the sixteenth and final soundtrack album by the cast of the American musical television series Glee. The 13-track album was released in two parts, on March 18 and 25, 2014, through Columbia Records.

== Background ==
The album was issued in two parts—the first six songs from the album was released on March 18, 2014, in conjunction with the premiere of the episode "100"; the hundredth overall episode in the series, and twelfth in the fifth season. The remaining seven songs were released on March 25, in conjunction with the premiere of the season's thirteenth episode "New Directions". The album was exclusively released at Target Corporation.

== Reception ==
Matt Collar of AllMusic wrote that the album "brings together tracks included on the episode as well as fan favorites from previous episodes of the hit Fox TV show." Janelle Tucknott of Renowned for Sound wrote "The album will likely be a welcome addition to the collection of fan memorabilia as a memento of such an important milestone."

== Track listing ==
Glee: The Music – Celebrating 100 Episodes track listing
No.	Title	Writer(s)	Original artist	Length
1.	"Raise Your Glass" (featuring Kristin Chenoweth)	Alecia Moore; Max Martin; Johan Schuster	Pink	3:25
2.	"Toxic"	Cathy Dennis; Christian Karlsson; Pontus Winnberg; Henrik Jonback	Britney Spears	3:50
3.	"Defying Gravity"	Stephen Schwartz	Idina Menzel; Kristin Chenoweth	2:21
4.	"Valerie"	Abi Harding; Boyan Chowdhury; Dave McCabe; Russ Pritchard; Sean Payne	The Zutons	3:34
5.	"Keep Holding On"	Avril Lavigne; Łukasz Gottwald	Avril Lavigne	4:05
6.	"Happy" (featuring Kristin Chenoweth and Gwyneth Paltrow)	Pharrell Williams	Pharrell Williams	3:53
7.	"Total Eclipse of the Heart" (featuring Kristin Chenoweth)	Jim Steinman	Bonnie Tyler	3:46
8.	"I Am Changing"	Henry Krieger; Tom Eyen	Jennifer Holliday	4:05
9.	"Party All the Time" (featuring Gwyneth Paltrow)	Rick James	Eddie Murphy	4:21
10.	"Loser Like Me"	Adam Anders; Shellback; Max Martin; Peer Åström; Savan Kotecha	Glee cast	3:51
11.	"Be Okay"	Mitchy Collins; Danielle Bouchard; Christian Medice; Phoebe Ryan; Denis Lipari; Larzz Principato	Oh Honey	3:18
12.	"Just Give Me a Reason"	Alecia Moore; Jeff Bhasker; Nate Ruess	Pink; Nate Ruess	4:01
13.	"Don't Stop Believin'"	Jonathan Cain; Steve Perry; Neal Schon	Journey	3:52
Total length:				48:22

== Personnel ==
Credits adapted from liner notes.

- Mark Salling – vocals
- Heather Morris – vocals
- Naya Rivera – vocals
- Amber Riley – vocals
- Chris Colfer – vocals
- Lea Michele – vocals
- Matthew Morrison – vocals
- Dianna Agron – vocals
- Amber Riley – vocals
- Darren Criss – vocals
- Chord Overstreet – vocals
- Jenna Ushkowitz – vocals
- Kevin McHale – vocals
- Lea Michele – vocals
- Kristin Chenoweth – featured vocals
- Gwyneth Paltrow – featured vocals
- David Loucks – additional vocals
- Jeanette Olsson – additional vocals
- Kala Balch – additional vocals
- Kamari Copeland – additional vocals
- Keri Larson – additional vocals
- Luke Edgemon – additional vocals
- Missi Hale – additional vocals
- Nikki Anders – additional vocals
- Nikki Leonti – additional vocals
- Onitsha Shaw – additional vocals
- RaVaughn Brown – additional vocals
- Storm Lee – additional vocals
- Tiffany Palmer – additional vocals
- Windy Wagner – additional vocals
- Adam Anders – music producer, vocal producer, arrangement, additional vocals
- Alex Anders – vocal producer, additional vocals
- Tim Davis – vocal producer, engineer additional vocals
- Peer Åström – music producer, arrangement, engineer, mixing
- Ryan Murphy – music producer
- Fredrik Jansson – assistant engineer
- Joshua Blanchard – assistant engineer
- Ryan Gillmor – assistant engineer
- Micheal Peterson – second assistant engineer
- Dominick Maita – mastering
- Allison Woest – album co-ordinator
- Heather Guibert – album co-ordinator
- Meaghan Lyons – album co-ordinator
- Nicole Fox – album co-ordinator
- Nicole Ray – production co-ordinator
- Dave Bett – art direction

== Charts ==
Chart performance for Glee: The Music – Celebrating 100 Episodes
Chart (2014)	Peak position
Australian Albums (ARIA)	35
US Billboard 200	22
US Top Soundtracks (Billboard)	3
