= New Directions (Glee) =

- Glee episode
- Episode no.: Season 5 Episode 13
- Directed by: Brad Falchuk
- Written by: Brad Falchuk
- Production code: 5ARC13
- Original air date: March 25, 2014

Guest appearances
- Gwyneth Paltrow as Holly Holliday; Kristin Chenoweth as April Rhodes; Dianna Agron as Quinn Fabray; Heather Morris as Brittany Pierce; Amber Riley as Mercedes Jones; Mark Salling as Noah "Puck" Puckerman; Harry Shum, Jr. as Mike Chang; Lauren Potter as Becky Jackson; Bob Glouberman as the Mitzvah University president

Episode chronology
| ← Previous "100" | Next → "New New York" |
- Glee season 5

"New Directions" is the thirteenth episode of the fifth season of the American musical television series Glee, and the one-hundred-first episode overall. Written and directed by series co-creator Brad Falchuk, it aired on Fox in the United States on March 25, 2014, and is the second part of a two-part anniversary episode that features the apparent end of New Directions after the club is shut down by principal Sue Sylvester (Jane Lynch). Many graduates of the glee club have returned, as have special guest stars Kristin Chenoweth as April Rhodes and Gwyneth Paltrow as Holly Holliday. This is the last appearance of Paltrow, Chenoweth, and Melissa Benoist on the series, although Benoist is still credited as a series regular throughout the remainder of the season.

== Plot ==
Holly Holliday (Gwyneth Paltrow) and April Rhodes (Kristin Chenoweth) are deciding how to save the glee club. Holly, attempting to use her friendship with Sue Sylvester (Jane Lynch) to help save the Glee Club, asks if they can incorporate music into other clubs at McKinley. Sue reluctantly agrees, but tells Holly that they only have one week to try it out.

Tina Cohen-Chang (Jenna Ushkowitz) is jealous that all of the other seniors have gotten their acceptance letters while she has not. Tina then enters the choir room as Rachel Berry (Lea Michele), Sam Evans (Chord Overstreet), and Artie Abrams (Kevin McHale) pack up the Glee Club’s trophies, which saddens her. Blaine Anderson (Darren Criss) and Kurt Hummel (Chris Colfer) announce that Blaine has been accepted to NYADA. Sam accidentally knocks Tina out with a trophy, prompting her to experience another fantasy. In the auditorium, Kurt and Mercedes (Amber Riley) have gathered all their friends and the current Glee Club to reminisce and to try to help mend the feud between Rachel and Santana Lopez (Naya Rivera). Kurt and Mercedes perform "I Am Changing"; while Rachel appears to be moved during the song, Santana seems impassive. Afterwards, Rachel tries to mend their relationship with a peace offering. Santana rebuffs by demanding all the shows in Funny Girl, leaving Rachel dismayed.

Meanwhile, Holly fills Will Schuester (Matthew Morrison) in on her plan to incorporate music into McKinley's other clubs. Will is hesitant, but Holly encourages Will to trust her. Dressed as Temple Grandin, Holly leads a class in a performance of Eddie Murphy's "Party All the Time". Sue, however, is not amused, having received many angry letters from concerned organizations, thus marking the end of Holly's extracurricular musical experiment. Will tells Sue he understands and he and Holly leave Sue's office. Will tells Holly that he has accepted that Glee Club is over. Holly hatches another plan and recruits Artie.

In the choir room, Brittany Pierce (Heather Morris) has filled the room with lilies and offers Santana two one-way tickets to Lesbos so that they can spend more time together. Santana, however, is still hesitant and feels that Brittany's offer may have more to do with her wanting to escape MIT rather than her desire for them to actually be together. Santana also tells Brittany she does not want to give up her understudy role in Funny Girl because it is a great first step toward being rich and famous, and she does not want to allow Rachel to win their feud. Brittany reminds Santana that Broadway has never been her dream, so walking away from a role she does not really care about would be a win for her. Santana, realizing Brittany is right, thanks her for straightening her out. She leans her head against Brittany's shoulder and the two cuddle.

Tina informs Blaine, Sam and Artie that she was rejected from Mitzvah University, a school she applied to so she could be with her friends in New York. Sam and Blaine attempt to cheer her up to no avail. Blaine, Sam, and Artie sing an acoustic version of "Loser like Me" with Tina. Afterward, they are able to cheer her up by convincing her they will figure out what she can do. Santana meets Rachel in the auditorium, where she reveals that she is withdrawing from the show, but not as her understudy for herself. Pleased, Rachel and Santana sing "Be Okay". Puck (Mark Salling) and Quinn Fabray (Dianna Agron) then perform "Just Give Me a Reason" and announce to the Glee Club that they have decided to give a relationship a try, even though they will be long distance. Quinn acknowledges that it will be tough, but tells Puck she would rather do hard with him than easy with someone else. Everyone applauds as they share a kiss and Will announces that they have just performed the final song in the choir room.

Later, Will enters his office to discover a note asking him to come to the auditorium. Holly and the Glee Club have made a video for Will and his unborn child about how much he has meant to them as a teacher and a man. The video ends with Rachel coming out on stage to lead into a performance of "Don't Stop Believin'". Will is visibly moved and soon the rest of the Glee Club and alumni members join in as well. After the song, the Glee Club members share in a group hug while April and Holly watch from the auditorium entrance and congratulate themselves for a job well done. Artie, Blaine, Becky, Brittany, Sam and Tina all graduate with their fellow senior class. Tina reveals she was indeed accepted to Brown. After the graduation ceremony, Santana meets Brittany in the bathroom and says she does want to go away with Brittany, but also wants them to return together to New York after their trip is over, to which she agrees. Back in the choir room, Will meets Sue, who admits that Will's work in the Glee Club helped change many kids lives – and his own – for the better, and says she will miss the fighting between them. Sue reveals she got Will an interview at Carmel High for the position of Glee Club director for Vocal Adrenaline. Will is hesitant, but Sue argues that Will needs to be doing what he is passionate about – teaching Glee Club – and he could do many good things with the healthy budget that Vocal Adrenaline has. Sue leaves Will alone in the choir room to decide on how to proceed. With memories of the Glee Club flooding through his mind, Will turns out the lights and leaves the choir room for the last time.

== Production ==
Series co-creator Brad Falchuk wrote and directed this episode. The first part of the two-parter had been directed by Paris Barclay, and written by Falchuk along with the other two co-creators, Ryan Murphy and Ian Brennan.

The show made a list of thirty songs that had previously been performed on the show, and invited fans to vote on which ones should appear in the 100th episode in a promotion called "Gleek's Choice" that was run at the end of November 2013. At least ten of these, which were not immediately announced, were set to be featured in this episode, though not necessarily sung by the same artists as before. The list of thirteen songs that was eventually released in late February 2014 for what turned out to be a two-part 100th episode contained eight songs from the original thirty-song list, not ten.

One of those songs is Journey's "Don't Stop Believin'", which was filmed on February 24, 2014, the day that the 100th episode was celebrated on set.

A number of former main characters on the show have returned for this two-part episode. These include Yale student Quinn Fabray (Dianna Agron), MIT student Brittany Pierce (Heather Morris), Airman Noah "Puck" Puckerman (Mark Salling), UCLA student and aspiring singer Mercedes Jones (Amber Riley), and Joffrey Ballet School student Mike Chang (Harry Shum, Jr.).

Two characters played by special guest stars return as well: April Rhodes (Kristin Chenoweth), who went to Broadway to star in an original musical that won at least one Tony award, and substitute teacher Holly Holliday (Gwyneth Paltrow). A recurring character in this episode is cheerleader Becky Jackson (Lauren Potter).

An album, Glee: The Music – Celebrating 100 Episodes was released with thirteen songs on it, featuring music from both this episode and the previous one (its first part). The full album was released on March 25, 2014, and includes the six songs from this episode. Two of these songs are new covers of songs that have previously appeared on Glee: the original song "Loser like Me" performed by Darren Criss, Kevin McHale, Chord Overstreet and Jenna Ushkowitz; and a new version of Journey's "Don't Stop Believin'" that features Lea Michele, Morrison, Criss, Chris Colfer, McHale and Ushkowitz. The remaining four songs are new to the show: Eddie Murphy's "Party All the Time" sung by Paltrow; Oh Honey's "Be Okay" performed by Michele and Naya Rivera; "I Am Changing" from the musical Dreamgirls featuring Colfer and Riley; and Pink featuring Nate Ruess's "Just Give Me a Reason" sung by Salling and Agron. A seventh song, Bonnie Tyler's "Total Eclipse of the Heart", which was to be sung by Chenoweth and Morrison, was cut from the episode, although it is included on the album.
