= Holly Holliday =

Fictional character from the Fox series Glee

- Glee character
- Gwyneth Paltrow as Holly Holliday in Glee
- First appearance: "The Substitute" (2010)
- Last appearance: "New Directions" (2014)
- Created by: Ryan Murphy
- Portrayed by: Gwyneth Paltrow

In-universe information
- Occupation: Substitute teacher
- Significant other: Will Schuester

Holly Holliday is a recurring fictional character from the Fox musical comedy-drama series, Glee. Portrayed by Gwyneth Paltrow, the character appeared in three episodes during the show's second season and two episodes of the fifth. This was Paltrow's first role on television. Holly was developed by Glee co-creator Ryan Murphy, a personal friend of Paltrow's, who suggested that she showcase her vocal and dancing abilities ahead of the release of her film Country Strong, in which she played a country singer. Introduced as a substitute teacher who takes the place of glee club director Will Schuester (Matthew Morrison) while he is ill, she forms a romantic bond with Will, but decides to break up with him and takes a teaching job in another town after realizing that he is still in love with Emma Pillsbury (Jayma Mays).

Paltrow's debut performance attracted positive commentary and earned her a Primetime Emmy Award for Outstanding Guest Actress in a Comedy Series in 2011. Many reviewers praised her subsequent portrayal of Holly in the "Sexy" episode, preferring it to her first appearance in "The Substitute" installment, though they disagreed over how Paltrow was used. Her final appearance in the "A Night of Neglect" episode was met with divergent reactions. She performed several musical numbers during her appearances, which include critically acclaimed renditions of "Forget You" by Cee Lo Green and "Landslide" by Fleetwood Mac. Paltrow was additionally featured in the 2011 concert film Glee: The 3D Concert Movie. In 2014, she reprised the role for the show's hundredth episode and the following episode.

== Storylines ==
Holly is a substitute teacher who makes her first appearance on Glee in the second season's seventh episode, "The Substitute". She is filling in at McKinley High School for the ailing Spanish teacher Will (Matthew Morrison), who is also director of the glee club, New Directions. Club member Kurt (Chris Colfer), who had seen her perform "Conjunction Junction" when she subbed for his English class, asks her to also take over Will's glee club rehearsals. Instead of assigning songs, Holly asks the club members what kind of music they would like to perform, and when Puck (Mark Salling) suggests "Forget You", she sings the song and they all join in, except for Rachel (Lea Michele). Holly later wins her over by asking Rachel what she would like to sing that she hasn't been able to, and they perform a number from Chicago together. Holly bonds with Sue (Jane Lynch), who is the acting principal with Principal Figgins (Iqbal Theba) also out sick, and Sue fires the still-ailing Will, making Holly the full-time director of the glee club. When he recovers, Will confronts Holly at school, but she is unwilling to give up her new position. She later discovers she is in over her head when Mercedes (Amber Riley) gets in trouble, and Holly turns to Will for help. She reveals that she was once a more serious teacher like Will until a student punched her in the face, at which point she became far more free spirited. Holly ultimately returns to substitute teaching and Will is reinstated. He assigns the glee club to perform "Singin' in the Rain" on his return, but faced with their dismay at being given another old song, he asks for Holly's help to modernize it, and they all perform a mash-up of it with Rihanna's "Umbrella".

Holly later returns to McKinley High as a substitute sex education teacher in the season's fifteenth episode, "Sexy". She informs Will that the members of New Directions are woefully ignorant about sex. He invites her to teach the glee club about safe sex, and she performs a rendition of Joan Jett's "Do You Wanna Touch Me (Oh Yeah)", much to the chagrin of the new head of the celibacy club, guidance counselor Emma (Jayma Mays). Holly advises Puck and Lauren (Ashley Fink) that the sex tape they plan to make is illegal, as both are minors, and helps Brittany (Heather Morris) and Santana (Naya Rivera) start to come to terms with their true feelings for each other, later performing "Landslide" with them in front of the club. When Emma's choice of "Afternoon Delight" as an abstinence song reveals her sexual naivete, her husband Carl (John Stamos) asks Holly for an appointment for him and Emma to work out issues in their sex life. During the counseling session, he reveals that Emma is still a virgin, and in answer to a question from Holly, Emma admits that she may still have feelings for Will. At the end of the episode, Holly begins a relationship with Will.

Holly makes her final second-season appearance two episodes later in "A Night of Neglect". She is still dating Will, and suggests to him that in order to help raise funds for the academic decathlon team, the glee club should present a benefit concert at the school that will feature songs by "neglected" artists. Her contribution to the benefit is a performance of Adele's "Turning Tables". At the end of the episode, realizing that he is still in love with Emma, Holly breaks up with Will and takes a several-month substitute teaching job in another town.

In January 2014, it was confirmed that Gwyneth Paltrow would reprise her role as Holly for the show's special two-part hundredth episode, among other past guest stars. In the episode, Holly slides through the class after being invited by an apologetic April Rhodes (Kristin Chenoweth) to keep the spirit of the glee kids and alumni up by performing. She refuses to follow Will's assignment of redoing the songs they performed, and instead sings "Happy". She and April vow to try to save the glee club after seeing Will giving a pep talk to the alumni. In the following episode, it is revealed that she and Sue remain best friends and auditioned for The Amazing Race together, going by the name "Team Gorgeous". She asks Sue to give glee club a chance to slip onto other clubs at school and Sue gives her a week to try. After her performance of "Party All the Time" got parents mad, Will told her to stop trying as he has accepted that Glee is over. Holly enlists Artie Abrams (Kevin McHale) to make a video for Will and his unborn baby filled with the testimonies of glee club members and alumni about what he and the glee club mean to them. After Will performs one last time with the kids, Holly asks April to go on a gay boy cruise so that they will get all the attention as they will be the only ladies there. April answers with Holly's signature phrase "I thought you'd never ask".

== Development ==
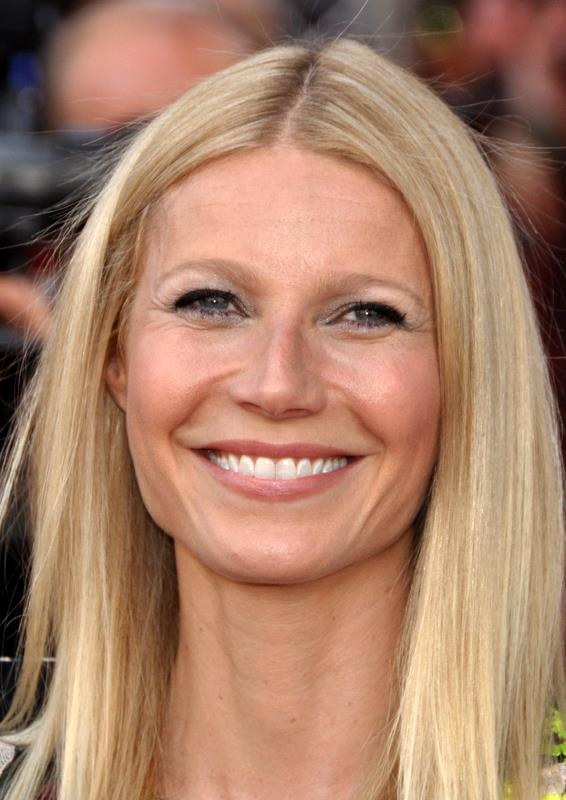
The role of Holly Holliday was created specifically for Paltrow (pictured).

The role of Holly was created by series co-creator Ryan Murphy specifically for Paltrow, a personal friend. Murphy suggested that she showcase her vocal and dancing talent ahead of the December 2010 release of the film Country Strong, in which Paltrow plays a country singer. Murphy said of Paltrow, "Gwyneth is a great singer. She's done it a little bit but I really want to show it off and show everyone how great she is." It was not the first time Paltrow had sung on screen: she played a karaoke singer in the movie Duets in 2000, and had a number one hit in Australia for her duet of "Cruisin'" from its soundtrack.

The character was originally set to appear for two episodes, as a love interest for Will Schuester in a love quadrangle with Will, Emma and Carl. Her debut was subsequently reduced to a single episode, and the relationship plot removed. After "The Substitute" episode aired, Murphy expressed interest in having Paltrow return with the right storyline. A few months later, she confirmed she would be seen again on the series, and was initially supposed to appear in episodes fifteen and sixteen, but instead appeared in episodes fifteen and seventeen, "Sexy" and "A Night of Neglect", the second of these being her final appearance.

Paltrow initially said about a possible return to Glee in its third season: "No, I don't think so. I don't think I should. Though it's honestly been one of the best jobs I've ever had." She did later state that she would love to come back, and said that Holly was "probably the most fun character I've ever gotten to play". Murphy stated before the second season ended that he had plans for Paltrow to return in season three, though nothing specific has been mentioned since the beginning of the third season. Paltrow, however, was featured in Glee: The 3D Concert Movie after being filmed while she performed "Forget You" as Holly in the 2011 Glee Live! In Concert! tour performances of June 16 and 17, 2011.

== Critical reception ==
Paltrow's performance in "The Substitute" episode earned her a Primetime Emmy Award for Outstanding Guest Actress in a Comedy Series and attracted critical praise. Indeed, at the time, Entertainment Weekly's Tim Stack and E! Online's Kristin dos Santos called her appearance Emmy-worthy, with the former rating it among her best performances, and the latter stating that Holly received "some of Glee's best-ever one-liners. The A.V. Club's Emily VanDerWerff wrote that Holly injected an effortless sense of fun, despite much of her plot being nonsensical. The Atlantic's Meghan Brown commented that Paltrow "brought a massive spark to what could have been a one-note role", and her co-author Kevin Fallon wrote that her energetic performance saved an episode that might have been "in shambles without her presence". Robert Canning of IGN noted that Paltrow's casting could have been distracting, but instead she fit the role "seamlessly". Brett Berk of Vanity Fair found her "surprisingly great", and James Poniewozik of Time stated that while her casting was somewhat distracting, she was able to make Holly a sympathetic character without overdoing her neediness and commitment-phobia. However, the National Alliance on Mental Illness (NAMI) took exception Paltrow's history classroom scene where she role-plays as Mary Todd Lincoln, which it stated "mocked and trivialized bipolar disorder".

Several critics preferred Paltrow's return in the "Sexy" installment to her initial appearance. The Washington Post's Emily Yahr felt that she was better integrated into this episode, and Raymund Flandez of the Wall Street Journal called her return "infinitely better" than her first appearance: "Back then, she was a puzzle, a loony bin. Here, she's sly and quick-witted, appropriately adult and seductively saucy in an episode that showcased more of her comedic timing, than her stiff dance skills. All the better for us." Fallon wrote that Paltrow was "if possible, even sassier and sultrier" than before, and felt that she served to anchor a busy episode. In contrast, Sandra Gonzalez of Entertainment Weekly had mixed feelings about Holly and believed that she dominated screen time. VanDerWerff liked Paltrow's acting, but disliked Holly's interaction with Will, saying they lacked "chemistry". Soraya Roberts of the Daily News disliked her return for prolonging Will and Emma's separation, branding Holly a home-wrecker. She commented that while Paltrow's appearance in "The Substitute" was "relatively fresh", in "Sexy" she was "acting almost like a cardboard cutout version of her former self, overly enunciating her lines [and] treading carefully around her choreography". Poniewozik found all of Paltrow's scenes "labored and ridiculous", and wrote that the actress failed to bring an element of realism to her character. Canning said that "the moment she came on screen the whole episode lit up", and the episode was a "fun and funny showcase for everybody's favorite recurring character", and Futterman echoed him when she called Paltrow "our new favorite cast member".

Paltrow's final appearance in the "A Night of Neglect" episode was met with divergent reactions. Both MTV journalist Aly Semigran and Gonzalez approved of Holly's departure, the latter of whom stating that Glee writers gave the character an appropriate ending and rounded out her arc. In contrast, CNN writer Lisa Respers France was dismayed by the character's exit and favored Holly's "memorable" characterization in the episode. The Washington Post's Lisa de Moraes expressed interest in a season three return, and Canning described Holly as "charming as ever" in the episode. Myles McNutt, writing for The A.V. Club, felt the installment "captured the occasional awkwardness of Paltrow's presence on the show", and wrote that casting such a prominent actress "has its disadvantages when you know that she's only around on a temporary basis". TVLine correspondent Michael Slezak noted that Will and Emma's romance—and that Paltrow probably was not ready to commit to the series full-time—led to Holly's adieu. Slezak concluded that what he liked about Holly, was that she did not succumb to Will, which, according to Slezak, made him less annoying.

== Musical performances ==
Paltrow's rendition of Cee Lo Green's "F#@k You", sanitized and retitled "Forget You" and featured on the soundtrack album Glee: The Music, Volume 4, garnered positive critical reception. Anthony Benigno, an editor for the Daily News, and Time's James Poniewozik criticized the show for sanitizing the song, but while the latter found it inferior to the original version, the former preferred Paltrow's deeper voice and awarded it an "A". Rolling Stone's Erica Futterman felt the censorship of the song did not adversely affect its success, and deemed the performance "charming and sassy". Megan Vick of Billboard favored it as "the most exciting number" of the episode, and Entertainment Weekly's Tim Stack went further in his praise: he bestowed a grade of "A+" and lauded it as "one of the most memorable and energetic Glee performances ever, thanks in no small part to Paltrow". Green expressed approval of the rendition. Benigno gave her short performance of "Conjunction Junction" an "A", and described it as "a glorious ten seconds", and granted the installment's mash-up of "Singin' In The Rain / Umbrella" a "B". Stack said that he loved the mash-up and gave it an "A−". Amy Reiter of the Los Angeles Times appreciated the mash-up's choreography and the manner in which "Paltrow's sassiness undercuts [Morrison's] overripe sweetness", and named it potentially her favorite group number of the second season. "Forget You" reached number eleven on the Billboard Hot 100 and twelve on the Canadian Hot 100, and the "Singing in the Rain / Umbrella" peaked at number ten on the Irish Singles Chart. Green's "Fuck You!" entered the top ten of the Hot 100 for the first time following the Glee cover, with sales rising 94% in a week.

Most reviewers agreed that the performance of "Do You Wanna Touch Me (Oh Yeah)" was sexy. Benigno was one of these and was entertained by the number, but he thought Holly's "vocals seem oddly subdued trying to imitate Joan Jett's voice" and gave it a "B" grade. Gonzalez gave the same grade and also took issue with the vocals, though she enjoyed the energy. Futterman had a different view of the singing, and said that "Holly can't quite muster Jett's vocal power". Berk gave the song four stars out of five and noted the "amazing hairography", while Roberts called the performance a "leather-clad, hair-whipping mess". Slezak gave the performance an "A" and wrote that Paltrow "completely captured the track's naughty spirit". "Do You Wanna Touch Me (Oh Yeah)" entered the Hot 100 at number fifty-seven, and the Canadian Hot 100 at number sixty-three.

There was not much enthusiasm for Morrison and Paltrow's performance of Prince's "Kiss". BuddyTV's Jen Harper noted that "Holly saved the song" for her. Futterman did not "feel the chemistry" until the final kiss. Benigno, on the other hand, said that the chemistry between them was "palpable", called the cover "pretty great", and gave it a "B+". Roberts deemed Paltrow's tango rigid, and The Atlantic author Patrick Burns commented that white people ought to be deterred from performing Prince. He called the music "uninteresting and soulless", and was dismayed that the tango was "just white with white people tango dancing". Flandez, however, enjoyed their dancing and wrote, "The strong holds, the slow cuts, the perfect swivel of hips and the lean-to's were mesmerizingly seductive." "Kiss" charted at number eighty-three on Hot 100, and also made number eighty on the Canadian Hot 100.

Paltrow's performance of Fleetwood Mac's "Landslide" received the most praise of the songs in the "Sexy" installment; indeed, both VanDerWerff and Harper named it the episode's best number. Harper noted the "great harmonies" and added, "I got goose bumps." Houston Chronicle contributor Bobby Hankinson called the rendition "gorgeous" and Berk used "perfection"; Berk went above his five star maximum to give the performance six stars. Roberts found the performance "pretty but uninspired", though Flandez called it "a dreamy, perfectly pitched power song of lesbian love" and Poniewozik "surprisingly poignant". Benigno and Slezak both noted that the cover was based on the version by the Dixie Chicks, and gave grades of "A−" and "B+" respectively. The "B+" from Gonzalez came with a caveat: she wished that Rivera, rather than Paltrow, had sung the lead vocal because of the meaning the song held for Santana. Stevie Nicks welcomed the cover of "Landslide", and hoped it would bring the Fleetwood Mac's songs to a new generation. She approved of the performance, and said that Paltrow "sang it beautifully". On the Hot 100, the rendition of "Landslide" debuted at number twenty-three; it was at number thirty-five on the Canadian Hot 100.

Paltrow's performance of Adele's "Turning Tables" was considered inferior to the original. While Flandez called it a "scene-stealing turn" and commended it visually and vocally, he noted that Paltrow lacks Adele's veracity. Futterman named it her least-favorite of Paltrow's covers to date and said that her vocals "lacked the texture that made Adele's version so heartbreaking." Gonzalez gave the performance her lowest grade of the episode, a "B−", and Semigran opined that while Paltrow is "a nice enough singer," she "in no way has the chops" the piece requires. McNutt characterized the decision to have Paltrow cover "Turning Tables" unfair in comparison to Adele's original, "given that Paltrow's singing is only passable". Slezak, however, said that Paltrow delivered a controlled, understated performance and CNN's Lisa Respers France simply deemed the performance memorable. The version reached number sixty-six in the US and Canada.
