= Born This Way (Glee) =

- Glee episode
- Episode no.: Season 2 Episode 18
- Directed by: Alfonso Gomez-Rejon
- Written by: Brad Falchuk
- Production code: 2ARC18
- Original air date: April 26, 2011
- Running time: 58 minutes

Guest appearances
- Iqbal Theba as Principal Figgins; Daniel Roebuck as Paul Karofsky; George Wyner as the plastic surgeon; Kathleen Quinlan as Dr. Shane; Harry Shum Jr. as Mike Chang; Chord Overstreet as Sam Evans; Darren Criss as Blaine Anderson; Ashley Fink as Lauren Zizes; Max Adler as Dave Karofsky; James Earl as Azimio; Telly Leung as Wes

Episode chronology
← Previous "A Night of Neglect"	Next → "Rumours"
- Glee season 2

"Born This Way" is the eighteenth episode of the second season of the American television series Glee, and the fortieth episode overall. It originally aired on Fox in the United States on April 26, 2011. The episode was written by Brad Falchuk and directed by Alfonso Gomez-Rejon, and is a tribute to Lady Gaga, the second such tribute to the artist in the show's history; the first one was "Theatricality". Most of the major plots of the episode center on the topic of homosexuality, as Kurt (Chris Colfer) lays the groundwork for his longtime bully Dave Karofsky (Max Adler) to come to terms with his sexuality, Quinn (Dianna Agron) deals with her past as a victim of bullying, and Santana (Naya Rivera) plots to run for school prom queen in the hopes of winning her love interest Brittany (Heather Morris) from Artie (Kevin McHale).

"Born This Way" attracted mostly positive reception from most critics of the show, as many felt that it was one of the better episodes of the season. However, the episode came under scrutiny by several conservative media critics who criticized the show's depiction of homosexuality. This episode featured cover versions of seven songs, including a cover of "Born This Way" by Lady Gaga. Other musical works featured in the episode include cover versions of the Keane song "Somewhere Only We Know" and "I've Gotta Be Me" from the 1968 Broadway production Golden Rainbow. The musical covers and performances were met with generally positive reception from critics, with several noting that it contained the best musical selection in a while. With the exception of "Barbra Streisand", all cover versions were released as singles available for digital download.

Upon its initial airing, the episode was viewed by 8.62 million American viewers, and garnered a 3.4/11 Nielsen rating/share in the 18–49 demographic, the lowest ratings and total viewership of the season. The episode's ratings and total viewership significantly declined from the previous episode, "Night of Neglect", which had previously been the low point in viewership.

== Plot ==
During dance rehearsals for the upcoming Nationals competition, New Directions glee club co-captain Finn Hudson (Cory Monteith) accidentally breaks Rachel Berry's (Lea Michele) nose. Her doctor (George Wyner) recommends septoplasty and elective rhinoplasty; Rachel considers modelling her nose after Finn's current girlfriend Quinn Fabray (Dianna Agron), and the two girls duet on the mash-up "I Feel Pretty/Unpretty". Both Finn and Puck (Mark Salling) oppose her planned transformation. Puck tries to help her accept her nose as part of her Jewish heritage, and recruits Kurt Hummel (Chris Colfer), who convinces her to look to her idol Barbra Streisand, who refused to succumb to pressure to alter her nose. Ultimately, Rachel decides against having surgery.

Club member Santana Lopez (Naya Rivera) uses Rachel's broken nose as a launching point to highlight the other group members' physical flaws. Aiming to help them achieve self-acceptance, glee club director Will Schuester (Matthew Morrison) urges them to embrace their perceived flaws by printing them on T-shirts to be worn during a group performance of Lady Gaga's "Born This Way". He also encourages school guidance counselor Emma Pillsbury (Jayma Mays) to confront her OCD; she begins treatment with a psychiatrist, Dr. Shane (Kathleen Quinlan).

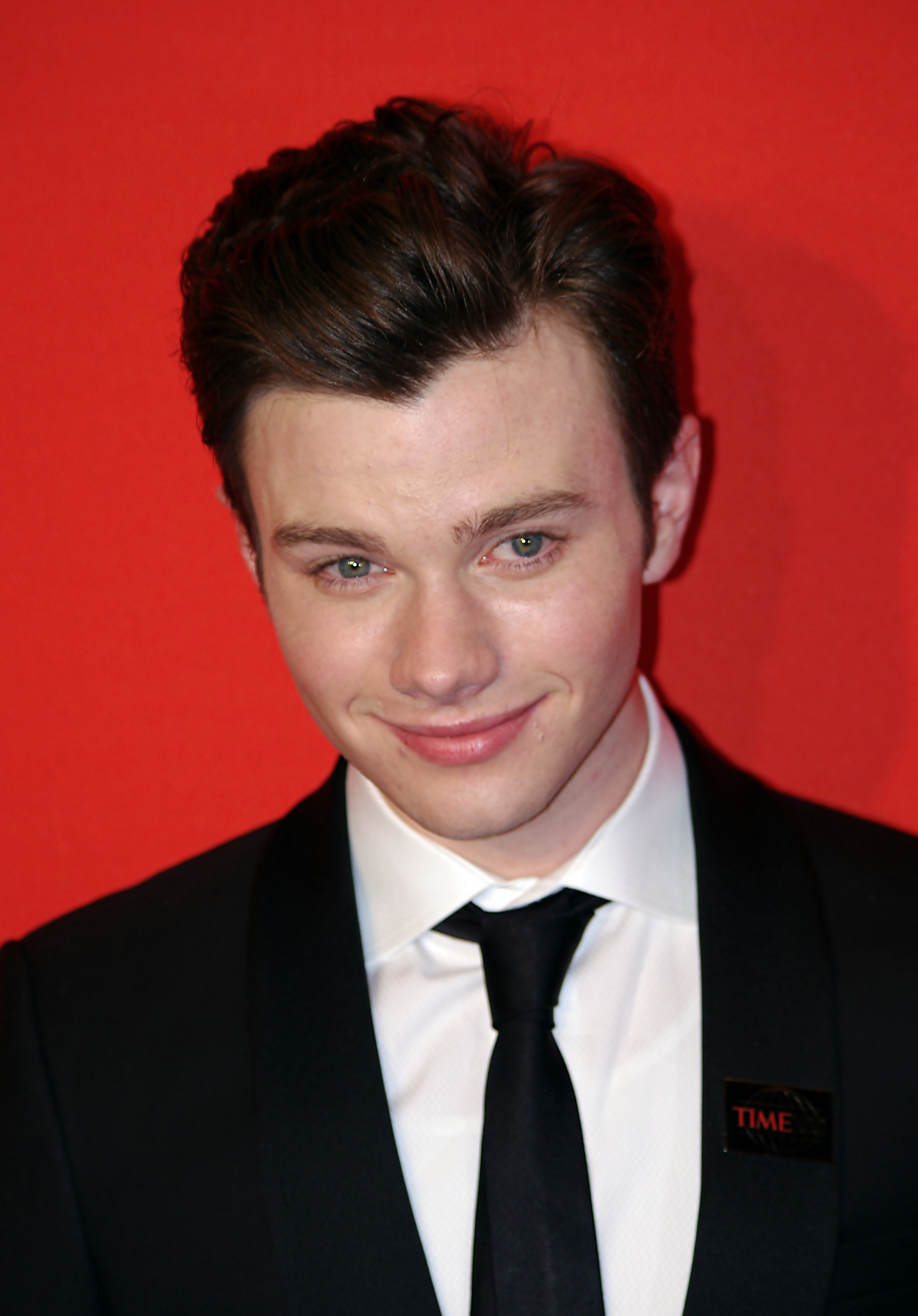
In this episode, Kurt (Chris Colfer, pictured) returns to McKinley High School.

Santana, who is a closeted lesbian, decides to run for school prom queen in the hope that she can win the love of her best friend Brittany Pierce (Heather Morris), who is dating Artie (Kevin McHale). She realizes that popular jock Dave Karofsky (Max Adler) is also in the closet, after noticing him checking out Sam (Chord Overstreet), and hatches an elaborate scheme to attain her goals: she threatens to out Karofsky unless he agrees to stop the bullying that drove Kurt from McKinley and the glee club. The pair form an anti-bullying club to make the school safer in order to entice Kurt back and bolster the glee club's chance at Nationals, though mostly to boost Santana's popularity before the prom. They also become one another's "beard" to bolster their heterosexual facades.

Karofsky issues an apology to Kurt at a group meeting involving Will, Principal Figgins (Iqbal Theba), and their fathers. Though Kurt wants to transfer back to McKinley from Dalton Academy, he is hesitant until Karofsky admits privately that Santana's prom queen scheme is behind his change of heart and the anti-bullying movement; Kurt agrees to return, but only if Karofsky will start a school PFLAG club with him. As Kurt arrives back at McKinley, the Dalton Academy Warblers glee club that he had joined while he was away—fronted by his boyfriend Blaine Anderson (Darren Criss)—serenades him in farewell with a rendition of Keane's "Somewhere Only We Know". Kurt marks his re-entry to New Directions with a solo performance of "As If We Never Said Goodbye" from Sunset Boulevard.

As the race for prom queen intensifies, Lauren Zizes (Ashley Fink) begins campaigning against Quinn. She discovers that Quinn's first name is Lucy, and that she used to be an overweight outcast who had rhinoplasty before re-inventing herself and transferring to McKinley. Lauren attempts to sabotage Quinn's campaign by revealing her former image to the other students, but it backfires when Quinn's popularity actually increases amongst the girls like Lauren, encouraged by the idea of someone able to rise above such difficulties like she did, and become popular. Lauren apologizes to Quinn, but Quinn commends her for her confidence and pride, and the two form a bond. Brittany shows off her shirt to Santana, and gives Santana a shirt reading "Lebanese", believing that it reads "Lesbian". Santana balks at wearing it, and the two argue; Brittany finally storms off saying that if Santana loved herself as much as Brittany loved her, she would put on the shirt and dance with her. The episode closes with the club, minus Santana, embracing their identities and performing "Born This Way". During the song, Emma arrives wearing a T-shirt that acknowledges her own problems—it reads "OCD"—and she and Will join the performance. Karofsky and Santana watch from the audience, with Santana wearing her "Lebanese" shirt.

== Production ==
""Born This Way" is a classic Glee episode where [they] explore embracing the things about ourselves that [they] don't like and tailoring [their] performances around that."

— Cory Monteith, on the synopsis of "Born This Way".

The episode was extended and ran for 90 minutes, as opposed to the usual 60 minutes. Michael Ausiello of TVLine reported that the producers included two extra musical performances to fill the extended time slot. Series creator Ian Brennan stated that he believed the extension was granted as there were two songs which would otherwise have been cut for length. He welcomed the additional 24 minutes of screen time, and commented: "We're always desperately cutting down our episodes. Even when we write them, and then in the editing room we're always throwing away stuff that I really love to get it down to time. [...] It will be just really interesting content-wise for us [to have an extension]."

The focus of the episode is Lady Gaga's song "Born This Way", which she approved for use in Glee before the song premiered. This was the second episode to highlight Gaga's music, the first one being season one's "Theatricality". According to Monteith, the focus of "Born This Way" is the characters "embracing the things about [them]selves that [they] don't like and tailoring [their] performances around that." It features homophobic Dave Karofsky starting to come to terms with his homosexuality. The plot arc, which began in the season's sixth episode, "Never Been Kissed", is intended by series creator Ryan Murphy to have a happy ending. He explained that, while someone like Karofsky could turn to drugs or alcohol or commit suicide, Glee is "by nature optimistic", so he plans to conclude the storyline positively. For fellow closeted character Santana, "Born This Way" set up the final three episodes of the season, which will increase focus on her love for her best friend Brittany. The episode additionally marked the first appearance of guest star Dr. Shane, "a very smart, cool and kind psychiatrist" who may become a recurring character. Other characters seen in "Born This Way" include glee club members Mike Chang (Harry Shum Jr.), Sam Evans and Lauren Zizes, Kurt's boyfriend Blaine Anderson, school bully Azimio (James Earl), Principal Figgins, and Karofsky's father, Paul (Daniel Roebuck).

In addition to "Born This Way", the other songs covered in the episode were Keane's "Somewhere Only We Know", "As If We Never Said Goodbye" from the musical Sunset Boulevard, a mash-up of "I Feel Pretty" from West Side Story and "Unpretty" by TLC, "I've Gotta Be Me" from the musical Golden Rainbow, and Duck Sauce's "Barbra Streisand". All but "Barbra Streisand" were released as digital singles for the episode. "Somewhere Only We Know" was included on the series' seventh soundtrack, Glee: The Music Presents the Warblers, and "As If We Never Said Goodbye", "Born This Way" and "I Feel Pretty / Unpretty" were included on the series' eighth soundtrack, Glee: The Music, Volume 6.

== Reception ==
=== Ratings ===
"Born This Way" was first broadcast on April 26, 2011, in the United States. It averaged a 3.4/11 Nielsen rating/share in the 18–49 demographic, and also averaged nearly 8.62 million American viewers during its initial airing. The first hour of the show garnered 8.3 million American viewers and a 3.3/9 rating in the 18–49 demographic, despite airing simultaneously with a rerun of NCIS on CBS, The Biggest Loser on NBC, No Ordinary Family on ABC, and One Tree Hill on The CW. The last half-hour of the episode had 8.5 million American viewers, as well as a 3.4/9 rating in the 18–49 demographic, despite airing alongside a rerun of NCIS: Los Angeles on CBS, Dancing with the Stars on ABC, The Voice on NBC, and Hellcats on The CW. The total viewership and ratings were the lowest of the second season of Glee, and was down from those of the previous episode, "Night of Neglect", which was watched by 9.80 million American viewers and acquired a 3.8/11 rating/share upon first airing. In the UK, the episode was watched by 2.52 million viewers (2.087 million on E4, and 433,000 on E4+1), becoming the most-watched show on E4 and E4 +1 for the week, and the most-watched show on cable for the week.

=== Critical response ===
"'Born This Way' was something different for Glee: a 90-minute episode [...]. And in another it was something absolutely ordinary for Glee: a return to its default theme of difference and acceptance. The former fact made the episode a little weird and overextended to fill out space, like an old house with a few too many additions built on. But the latter made it a pretty satisfying, if not first-class, return to roots for the show."

— James Poniewozik of Time.

"Born This Way" was given a positive reception by many critics of the show. Erica Futterman of Rolling Stone and Sandra Gonzalez of Entertainment Weekly both considered it to be an improvement from the previous episode. Futterman wrote that it "gave us the charm, wit and just-zany-enough-to-be-plausible plot lines we were sorely missing after last week's predictable" episode, and added, "Even better: the episode didn't feel as long as the 90 minutes it clocked in at." IGN's Robert Canning gave the episode a "great" rating of 8 out of 10. While he said the episode was entertaining, he felt that it did not need to be an hour and a half. Emily Yahr of The Washington Post agreed about the extended length, and did not like what she called "lame attempts to fill time", which she said "detracted from what started as a decent episode". She did, however, cite several "promising storylines", including Rachel's, and noted, "Usually, New Directions leader Rachel Berry is a caricature of all things annoying—but this episode, we see her genuinely struggling with wanting to love herself the way she is". The Houston Chronicle's Bobby Hankinson summed it up as follows: "Not an epic episode, just sort of … meh." Amy Reiter of the Los Angeles Times reacted more positively and wrote, "The 90-minute episode had a lot of laughs, a lot of heart, some good lessons, character development, a few good numbers and more than a few surprises."

The A.V. Club's Emily VanDerWerff gave it a "B", and wrote that she "finally got a sense that, yes, this second season has been building toward something and has been trying to tell an emotional story, as well as a humorous one. 'Born This Way', for the first time in a long time, made me feel like I could say I was a fan of Glee without a million qualifiers." Gary Mills of the Florida Times-Union felt that the episode didn't live up to its hype, but also said that he wasn't disappointed. Brett Berk of Vanity Fair reacted positively, and noted that by "focusing on what makes these lovable dorks, well, lovable dorks—and not pop, or high-school, superstars—tonight's episode, if a bit tidily, reminded us that these are supposed to be kids". Matt Zoller Seitz of Salon thought that "Born This Way" was "the show's best episode to date", and "an epic about a hero returning from a long journey, walking serenely through halls that once scared him, and performing with such skill and sincerity that his friends stared at him with love and awe." Aly Semigran of MTV had mixed emotions. She criticized the abrupt changes of the storylines in the episode, and thought that the episode "was a noble effort" but "it didn't quite work the way it was supposed to." Raymund Flandez of The Wall Street Journal stated that the episode "sounded just the perfect notes" and called it "the best episode yet". He continued: "The night held wonderful gems: A clear message. Witty repartee (…). Great character build up. And tailored songs that carried emotional heft."

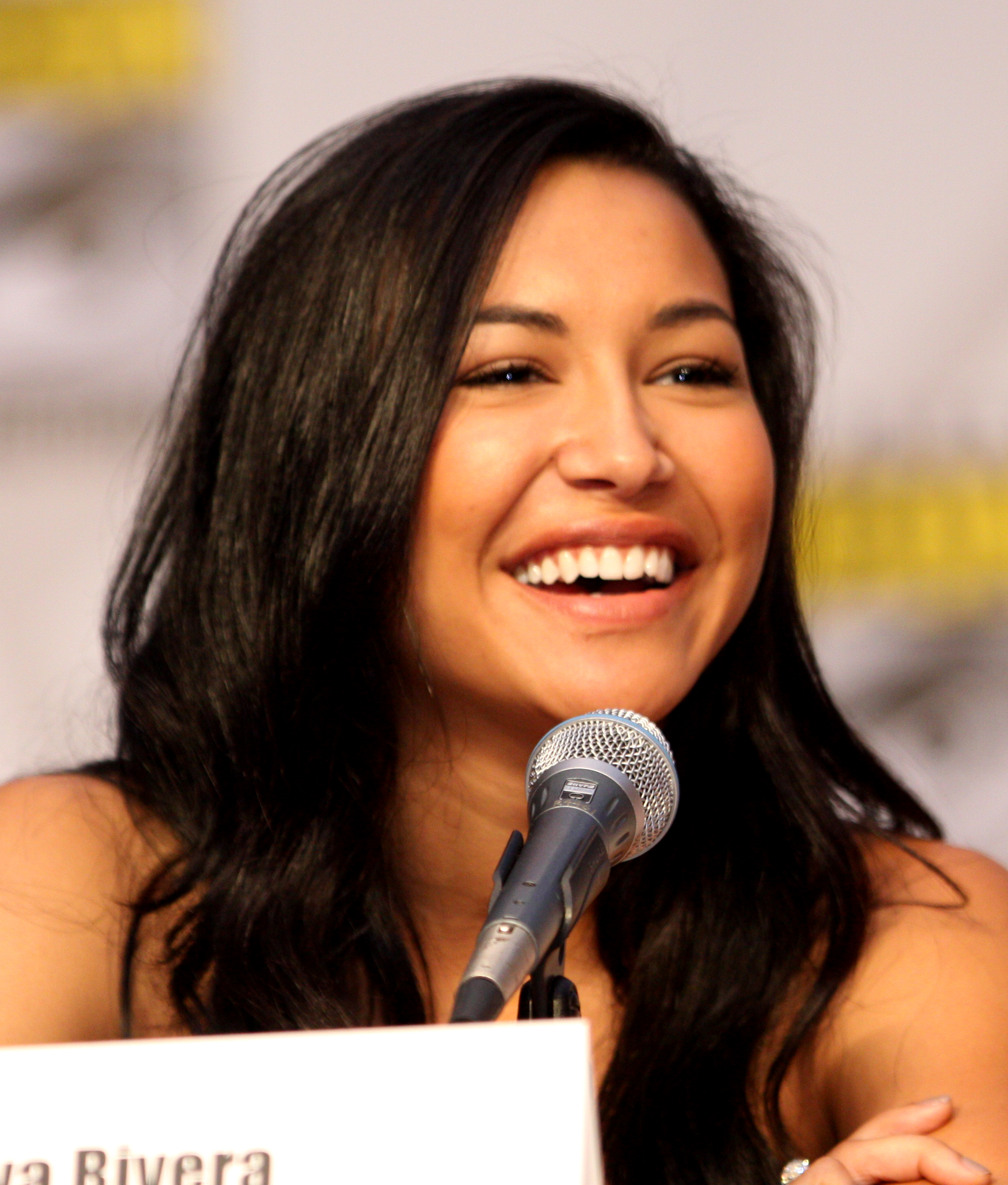
The character development of Santana (Naya Rivera, pictured) received much acclaim.

Several critics praised the development of Santana. Hankinson wrote, "My goodness, Santana. It's as if all the writers sat around a room, identified the best lines of tonight's episode and then decided to give them all to Santana. Fantastic." VanDerWerff called Santana the highlight of the episode: "The best thing about this episode is Naya Rivera's work as Santana and the story the three writers have cooked up for her. Rivera's really come into her own this season, going from just a generic bitchy cheerleader to an actual character who has motivations and might be a better villain for the show than Sue." She added, "the storyline of Santana realizing she was in love with Brittany and, thus, is probably a lesbian has been nicely plotted and surprisingly deep. The reveal about Santana hasn't washed away her less savory qualities; indeed, it's heightened them, to a degree, as she struggles to be true to herself and still maintain her status as the hottest girl in school." Jenna Mullins of E! Online wrote of Santana, "This episode just cemented my love for her. The insult spew in the beginning of the episode was awesomely mean." She also said that Santana's "inner monologue is often more entertaining than other characters' outer monologues". CNN's Lisa Respers France considered Santana the episode's highlight, and went on to write, "She embraced her inner lesbian (sort of) and rattled off the best [lines] like 'the only straight I am is straight-up [bitch].' You gotta love that."

Some critics reacted negatively to the episode. Scott Pierce of The Salt Lake Tribune felt that the show has jumped the shark starting from this episode. He felt that the Kurt storyline had some major flaws, and that the messages being sent have been mixed. The episode garnered criticism from a number of conservatives, who found the depiction of homosexuality abrasive. In an interview with ABC News, conservative media critic Dan Gainor felt that it was Ryan Murphy's "latest depraved initiative to promote his gay agenda." He added: "This is clearly Ryan Murphy's vision of what growing up should be, not most of America's. It's a high school most parents would not want to send their kids to."

=== Music and performances ===
The musical performances and cover versions in the episode received generally positive commentary. Gonzalez stated that she loved the song choices, and Meghan Brown of The Atlantic felt that this episode carried the best selection of music of a Glee episode in a long time. Flandez commended that they are "tailored songs that carried emotional heft".

Critics mostly reacted with acclaim for the mash-up of "I Feel Pretty / Unpretty". Gonzalez gave the performance an "A" and commented: "While part of me would have said that pairing Rachel and Quinn for a duet would vocally be like putting a pit bull in a cage match with a Maltipoo, it actually worked! There was a surprisingly balanced and incredibly lovely tone." All three writers of The Atlantic's review praised the mash-up: Patrick Burns said it was beautiful, and noted that "the arrangement was clever, the ladies sounded great, and the song was placed perfectly into the plot of two characters who were restored a bit of their depth in this episode", Brown stated that the song was lovely, and Kevin Fallon felt that it was "unexpectedly gorgeous and haunting", and noted that it was "yet another example of how skilled the music directors are at these mash-ups." Semigran felt that it was the best performance of the night, and TVLine's Michael Slezak gave the piece an "A", and said that it was a "vocally and visually stunning set piece for the unlikeliest of duet partners." Flandez commented that the song "floated like gossamer between Rachel and Quinn as they beautifully poured the sentiments of ugly ducklings", and Futterman wrote, "It's a poignant moment, and the inclusion of West Side Story's 'I Feel Pretty' makes for a great pop/theater mash-up that reminds us of what Glee is at its heart."

Kurt's performance of "As If We Never Said Goodbye" was also met with critical acclaim. Brown stated that the song was "absolutely stunning in every conceivable way." She thought that he had the emotional connection, the musicality, and the storytelling ability "down pat". Gonzalez gave the song an "A−" and wrote, "Kurt apparently picked up a few helpful notes ... from his Warbler brothers and emerged an even better solo singer than I recall. ... Most enjoyable, however, was a tenderness Kurt added to the song that I don't think could have been duplicated by any other member of this ensemble." Slezak commended Kurt's voice, gave the song an "A", and said, "I feel like we haven't had too many strong musical moments from Kurt this season, but this number, which pushed Chris Colfer's falsetto to impressive heights, went a long way to erase the deficit." Futterman thought that it was "a sweeter moment than last season's 'Rose's Turn', but the high notes and big vocals are still there." Berk gave it three out of five stars and called it "lovely, and properly sentimental". Zoller Seitz called the performance "spellbinding" and concluded, "Chris Colfer turns 'As if We Never Said Goodbye' into a valentine to self-knowledge and self-improvement—and a young, gay singer's dream of treating the world as a stage and commanding it like a star."

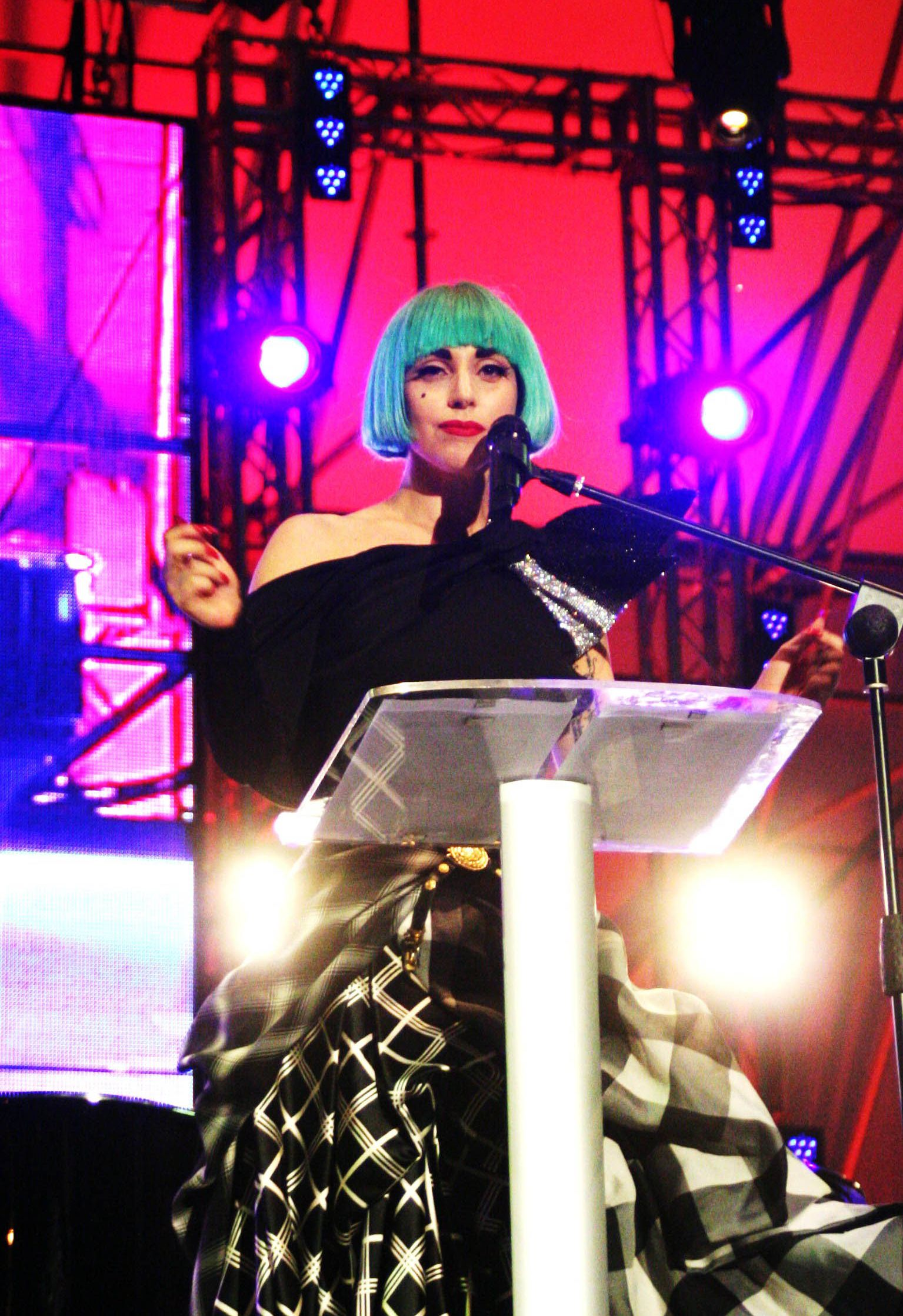
Lady Gaga had a positive reaction to the rendition of "Born This Way".

The New Directions' rendition of "Born This Way" was strongly approved by Lady Gaga. On her Twitter account, she wrote, "I really loved Glee's Born This Way episode. I admire the show for being brave+fighting for such modern social messaging. Never back down." Gonzalez gave the performance a "B+", and commented that it wasn't her favorite group number, mostly because she felt the song "wasn't [Lady Gaga's] best effort". Berk was less kind about the song, and called it a "crappy but thematically admirable Gaga tune", though he gave it three stars out of five. Slezak gave it an "A−" and approved of the rendition: "it was nice to see and hear Tina, Mercedes and Kurt on lead vocals—instead of, say, Blaine, Rachel, and Mr. Schue."

The duet of "I Gotta Be Me" by Finn and Mike was considered to be "shockingly adorable" by Berk, who gave it four stars out of five. Slezak was less impressed: "The jazz band arrangement and the Mike-teaches-Finn-some-moves choreography was cute, I guess, but it's not a good sign that I spent half the number focusing on Mike's matching green t-shirt and shoe laces." He went on to question the song's inclusion—"In an episode about confronting one's greatest teenage insecurities, I wonder if there might have been a better choice for a solo than the popular football player with the cheerleader girlfriend lamenting his inability to dance"—and ultimately gave the performance a "B−". Futterman also commented on the song's selection, though from a slightly different angle: "In theory it's charming—and there are definitely moments of the 'I can dance/You can't dance' exchange that were enjoyable—but we couldn't ever imagine this song as something Finn would have voluntarily picked."

"Somewhere Only We Know", as performed by Blaine and the Warblers, received an "A+" from Gonzalez, who loved the song and commented that she was "going to miss the Warblers". Slezak gave the performance a "B", and said that he "can't be too mad at another pretty song sung well by Darren Criss." The performance was acclaimed by Futterman, who wrote, "While the rest of the Warblers maintain their stoic facade, Blaine shows enough emotion to make this bittersweet Keane tune a simple, yet powerful, performance."

The flash-mob mall performance of "Barbra Streisand" was deemed to be pointless by Gonzalez, and she gave it a "C", her lowest grade of the episode. Futterman enjoyed the performance, thinking that it was "the episode's most fun moment and beats out last year's 'Safety Dance' for Glee numbers done in a mall." Slezak also reacted positively to the performance, giving it a "B+".

=== Chart history ===
Several of the cover versions featured debuted on numerous musical charts. The show's rendition of "Born This Way" debuted at number forty-four on the Billboard Hot 100, on an issue dated for May 4, 2011. It sold 73,000 copies in the United States in its first week of release as a digitally downloadable single. The mash-up of "I Feel Pretty / Unpretty" was the highest charted single featured in the episode, debuting at number twenty-two on the Billboard Hot 100. It also peaked at number thirteen on the Digital 100 charts and sold 112,000 digital downloads in the United States in its first week of release. It was the highest charting Glee single on the Billboard charts since "Loser like Me", which debuted at number six on the Billboard Hot 100 and sold over 210,000 downloads in its first week. "Somewhere Only We Know" peaked at number forty-two on the Billboard Hot 100 charts, and it sold over 75,000 copies within its first week. The fourth single, "As If We Never Said Goodbye", charted at number eighty.

In Ireland, two of the songs debuted on the Irish Singles Charts on an issue dated May 5, 2011. The mash-up peaked at number thirty-seven, while the cover version of "Somewhere Only We Know" trailed behind at number forty-seven. On May 6, three of the singles appeared on the Canadian Hot 100. The "I Feel Pretty / Unpretty" mash-up peaked the highest out of all the singles, debuting at twenty-eight. It was followed by "Born This Way" and "Somewhere Only We Know", which debuted at number thirty-one and fifty-two on the charts, respectively.
