= Oh Honey =

- How I Met Your Mother episode
- Episode no.: Season 6 Episode 15
- Directed by: Pamela Fryman
- Written by: Carter Bays; Craig Thomas
- Production code: 6ALH15
- Original air date: February 7, 2011

Guest appearances
- Jennifer Morrison as Zoey Pierson; Katy Perry as Honey

Episode chronology
← Previous "Last Words"	Next → "Desperation Day"
- How I Met Your Mother season 6

"Oh Honey" is the 15th episode of the sixth season of the CBS sitcom How I Met Your Mother and the 127th episode overall. It aired on February 7, 2011. It features Katy Perry as a guest star, playing Honey, the gullible character that the episode is named after.

== Plot ==
Marshall has decided to temporarily remain in St. Cloud, Minnesota following his father's death. Robin calls Marshal to inform him of the gang's activity, particularly the romance between Ted and Zoey. Robin explains that it began when Zoey offered to set Ted up with her cousin. Future Ted is unable to remember her name, and simply refers to her as "Honey", due to the fact she is endearingly gullible. At MacLaren's, Ted and Honey appear to be hitting it off, although Barney is also clearly enamored of her. Ted decides to let Barney leave with Honey, later confessing to Robin that he has fallen in love with Zoey despite her marriage to The Captain, Ted holds an intervention for himself, deciding that he should stop being friends with Zoey. The others do not want to lose Zoey as a friend and convince Ted to get over his feelings for her.

In the present, Marshall receives a call from Barney, who tells him that something strange had happened after hooking up with Honey. The following morning, Barney ran into Zoey and revealed that Ted had not hooked up with Honey after all; hearing this, Zoey hugged Barney out of relief. Marshall's brother Marcus, who is also eavesdropping on the call, realizes that Zoey is in love with Ted as well, so Marshall calls Ted. Before he can tell him, though, Ted explains that Zoey had arrived at his apartment to hang out, and Ted finally told her that he could not hang out with her anymore, but could not say why. Lily then calls Marshall, explaining that Ted had actually said that Lily hated her. Zoey rushed over to Lily's apartment to ask why; Lily initially tried to play along, but after hearing that Zoey was going through some tough times, lied and said that the reason for them being unable to hang out was because Robin hated her. Robin lied as well and said that Marshall hated her, much to the latter's annoyance, because Robin reasoned that Zoey would never call Marshall so soon after losing his father.

Honey calls Marshall, as Barney had left his cell phone in her room. She reveals that Barney had broken down in tears after she accidentally reminded him of his absent father, she informs him that Barney had tried to contact his father but had not received a response yet. Remembering Lily's story of Zoey going through a tough time, Marshall pretends to be Zoey's therapist and Honey reveals that Zoey is divorcing her husband as well as getting her own apartment. Zoey confronts Ted, demanding to know the real reason that he does not want to be friends. She thinks that Ted hates her, which he does not deny and rambles off all the things he likes about her, though saying them in a way to make it seem like they annoy him. Marshall separately calls Zoey and Ted, informing them of their feelings for each other and also telling Ted about Zoey's divorce, the two then embrace and kiss.

== Production ==
The Foo Fighters song "On the Mend" is featured in the episode.

== Release ==
=== Reception ===
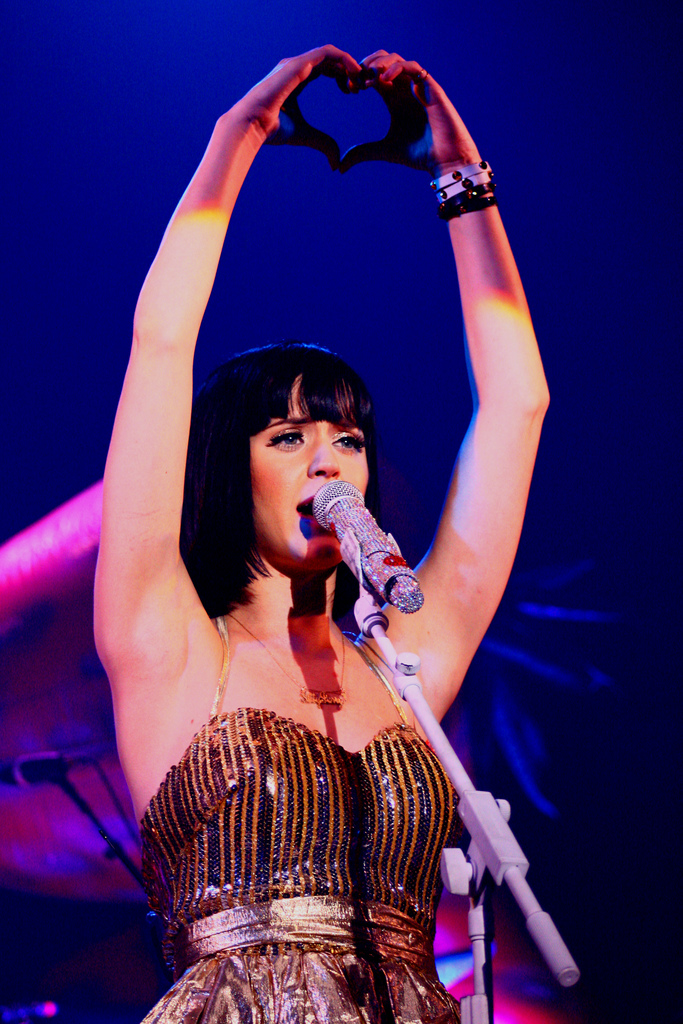
Katy Perry's performance was highly praised by critics.

Donna Bowman of The A.V. Club put the episode at A−, saying the story of Zoey and Ted's first kiss and the multiple phone conversations were gimmicks to keep the audience hooked. She also noted the various practical jokes that are common to people in the Midwest region.

Television Without Pity's DeAnn Welker also gave the episode an A−.

Eric Goldman of IGN gave the episode a 7.5.

The folk/indie pop band Oh Honey based their name on this episode's title. For her role in the episode, Perry won the People's Choice Award for Favorite TV Guest Star.
