= A Night of Neglect =

- Glee episode
- Episode no.: Season 2 Episode 17
- Directed by: Carol Banker
- Written by: Ian Brennan
- Production code: 2ARC17
- Original air date: April 19, 2011

Guest appearances
- Gwyneth Paltrow as Holly Holliday; Cheyenne Jackson as Dustin Goolsby; Stephen Tobolowsky as Sandy Ryerson; Jake Zyrus (Note: Credited as Charice.) as Sunshine Corazon; Harry Shum Jr. as Mike Chang; Chord Overstreet as Sam Evans; Darren Criss as Blaine Anderson; Ashley Fink as Lauren Zizes; Max Adler as Dave Karofsky; James Earl as Azimio; Bill A. Jones as Rod Remington; Josh Sussman as Jacob Ben Israel; Lauren Potter as Becky Jackson

Episode chronology
← Previous "Original Song"	Next → "Born This Way"
- Glee season 2

"A Night of Neglect" is the seventeenth episode of the second season of the American musical television series Glee, and the thirty-ninth episode overall. It was written by Ian Brennan, directed by Carol Banker, and aired on Fox in the United States on April 19, 2011. It features the McKinley High glee club, New Directions, fundraising for a fellow extracurricular activity group by holding a benefit concert, while cheerleading coach Sue Sylvester (Jane Lynch) attempts to thwart them.

Thirteen guest stars appeared in the episode, including Gwyneth Paltrow in her final season two appearance. Several cast members returned after extended absences: Jessalyn Gilsig, Cheyenne Jackson and Stephen Tobolowsky as members of Sue's anti-New Directions "League of Doom", and Jake Zyrus as student Sunshine Corazon. Four songs were covered and released as singles, and a fifth featured as a dance performance.

Upon its initial airing, the episode was viewed by 9.80 million American viewers, and garnered a 3.8/11 Nielsen rating/share in the 18–49 demographic. Critical commentary was generally negative. Reviewers generally disliked the storyline centered on the under-appreciation of student Mercedes Jones (Amber Riley), though they commended her performance of Aretha Franklin's "Ain't No Way".

The episode's comedy moments attracted some praise, though the guest stars and League of Doom plot were ill-received, as was the cutting short of a solo by Jenna Ushkowitz, and a rendition of Adele's "Turning Tables" by Paltrow, which critics found inferior to the original.

== Plot ==
Low on funds for an upcoming competition trip, glee club director Will Schuester (Matthew Morrison) suggests that the club members sell saltwater taffy to raise money. New Directions members Mike Chang (Harry Shum Jr.), Artie Abrams (Kevin McHale) and Tina Cohen-Chang (Jenna Ushkowitz) reveal they are on the Academic Decathlon team, which is also having funding problems. Brittany Pierce (Heather Morris) is the fourth, stand-in member, and proves surprisingly knowledgeable about cat diseases. Will's girlfriend, substitute teacher Holly Holliday (Gwyneth Paltrow), suggests holding a benefit concert for the Academic Decathlon team instead of selling additional taffy. Former McKinley student Sunshine Corazon (Jake Zyrus), who defected to rival glee club Vocal Adrenaline, is awarded the closing number at the concert after promising to bring her six hundred Twitter followers.

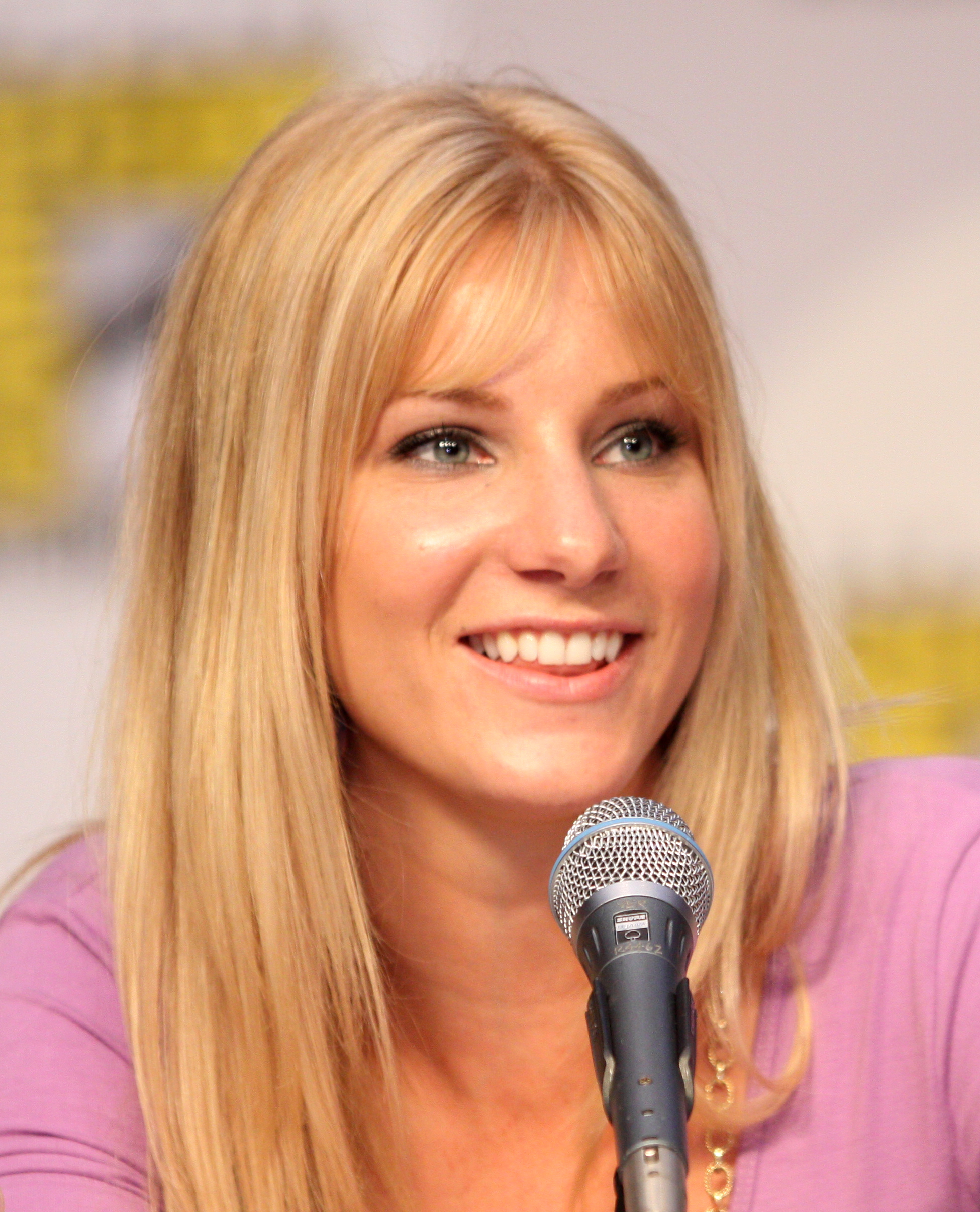
The intellectual skills of Brittany (Heather Morris, pictured) are highlighted in this episode.

Cheerleading coach Sue Sylvester (Jane Lynch) creates a "League of Doom", with members that include Will's ex-wife Terri Schuester (Jessalyn Gilsig), Vocal Adrenaline coach Dustin Goolsby (Cheyenne Jackson), and former McKinley High teacher Sandy Ryerson (Stephen Tobolowsky), to destroy the glee club. Tasked with breaking up Will and Holly, Dustin makes a failed attempt at seducing her. The targeted relationship begins to crumble anyway, when Will helps his former love Emma Pillsbury (Jayma Mays) with her stress-worsened OCD, after she reveals that her husband Carl Howell has asked for an annulment.

Former New Directions member Kurt Hummel (Chris Colfer) attends the concert, accompanied by his boyfriend Blaine Anderson (Darren Criss). They are confronted by closeted homophobic bully Dave Karofsky (Max Adler), who is forced to back down by Santana Lopez (Naya Rivera), in retribution for previously throwing a slushie in her face. Sunshine and her followers pull out of the concert on Dustin's orders, and Sandy and McKinley students Jacob Ben Israel (Josh Sussman), Azimio (James Earl) and Becky Jackson (Lauren Potter)—the only other members of the audience—heckle the glee club. Tina is reduced to tears by their booing; Mike fares better as the hecklers are given taffy to keep their mouths full.

During the intermission, Holly talks with the three students about the hidden cost of insults and suggests they cheer as opposed to jeering, but they opt to leave instead. Holly performs Adele's "Turning Tables" to Will. Mercedes Jones (Amber Riley), who on the advice of Lauren Zizes (Ashley Fink) has spent the lead-up to the concert making outrageous demands on her fellow club members to gain greater respect from them, performs the final number: a powerhouse version of Aretha Franklin's "Ain't No Way". She wows a stoned Sandy, who donates some of his drug profits to fund the Academic Decathlon team.

Holly takes a job in Cleveland, leaving Will free to pursue Emma, while Sue decides to bring Terri further into the game. The episode ends on the Academic Decathlon final's tiebreaker question, which is in the category "hermaphrodite Nazi sympathizers", a topic earlier taught in an irreverent history lesson by Holly.

== Production ==
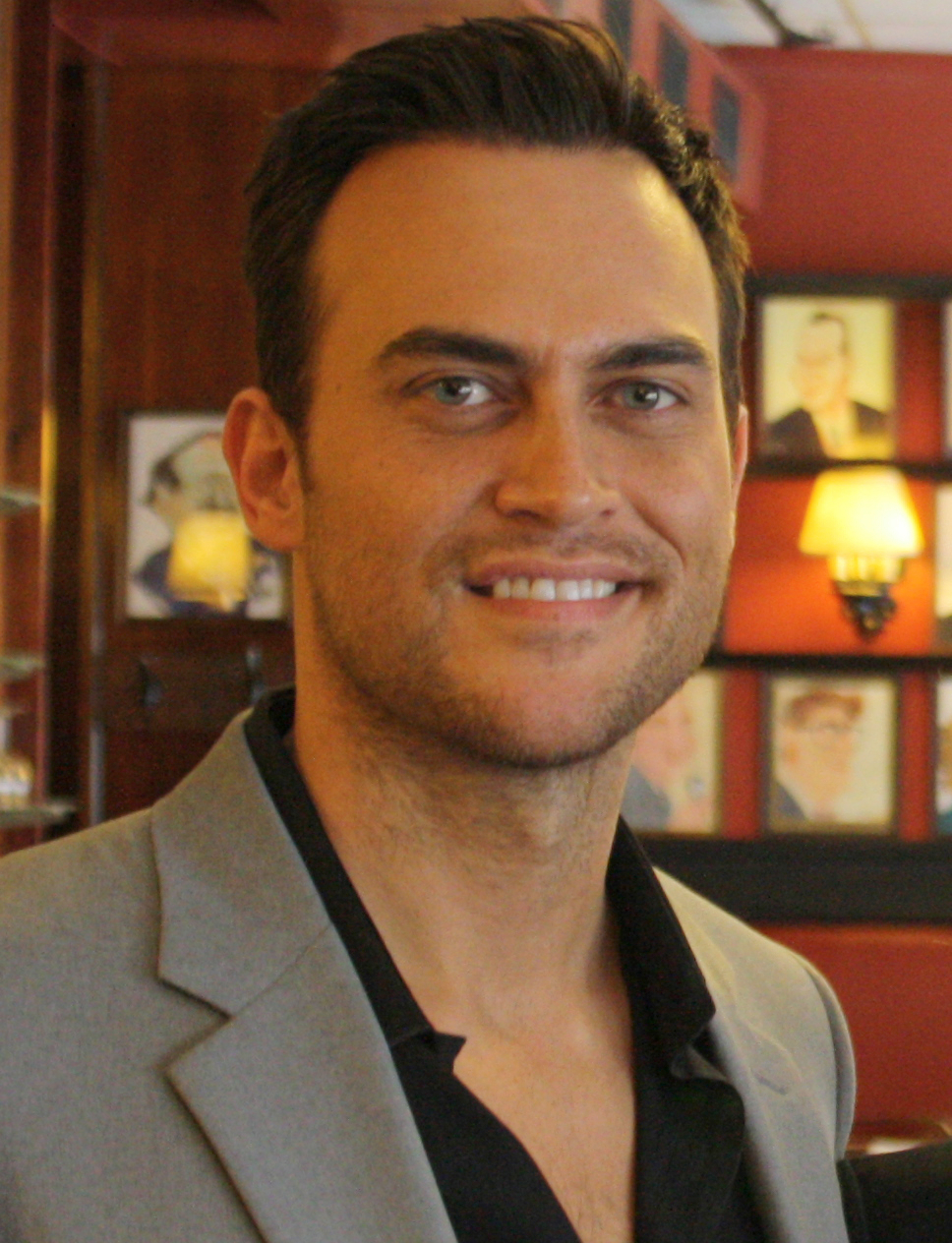
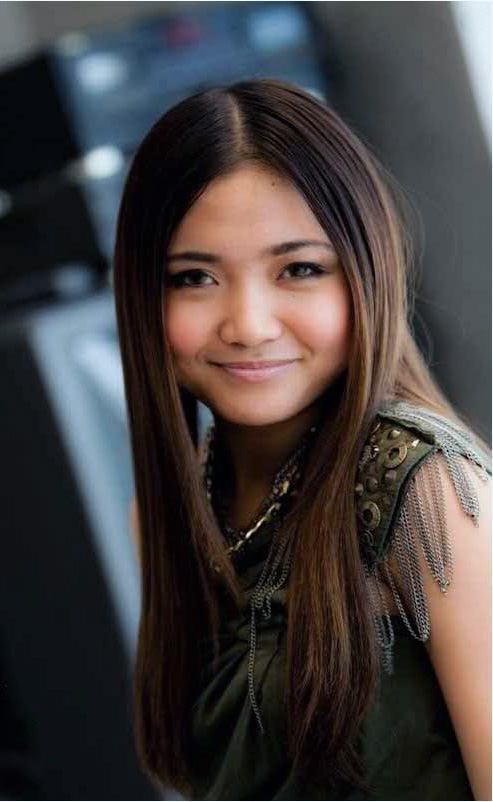
Cheyenne Jackson (left) and Jake Zyrus (right) reprise roles from the season's first episode

Thirteen guest stars were featured in "A Night of Neglect", including Paltrow, who made her third and final second-season appearance as substitute teacher Holly Holliday, following "The Substitute" and "Sexy". Having previously appeared in the second season's first episode, Jackson and Charice also returned, as Vocal Adrenaline's Dustin and Sunshine, respectively. Additional recurring guest characters who appeared were New Directions members Mike Chang, Sam Evans (Chord Overstreet) and Lauren Zizes, school bullies Dave Karofsky and Azimio, school reporter Jacob Ben Israel, cheerleader Becky Jackson, local news anchor Rod Remington (Bill A. Jones), and Blaine Anderson, lead singer of the Dalton Academy Warblers.

The musical focus of the episode was, according to cast member Cory Monteith, "artists that may have been neglected or under-appreciated over the years". He revealed that the series' attempt to clear music licensing rights to a song by Icelandic singer-songwriter Björk was complicated by the fact that she apparently did not have a telephone number. She eventually declined the request, as later revealed by Glee creator Ryan Murphy, because she felt the song would not have been appropriate to use in its proposed accompanying scene, but remained open to future suggestions as she mentioned that she had enjoyed the show.

The songs covered in the episode were Aretha Franklin's "Ain't No Way" performed by Riley; Celine Dion's cover of Eric Carmen's "All by Myself" performed by Charice; Lykke Li's "I Follow Rivers", performed by Ushkowitz; and Adele's "Turning Tables", performed by Paltrow. This marks the second time "All by Myself", a song Charice previously performed in concert, was covered on the series, the first being in the first season episode "Showmance". Jack Johnson's "Bubble Toes" also featured in the episode, as a dance routine performed by Shum Jr. All four vocal performances were released as digital singles, though only "All by Myself" and "Turning Tables" charted. The former peaked at number eighty-seven on the Billboard Hot 100, while the latter reached number sixty-six in both the US and Canada.

== Reception ==
=== Ratings ===
"A Night of Neglect" was first broadcast on April 19, 2011, in the United States. It garnered a 3.8/11 Nielsen rating/share in the 18–49 demographic, and received nearly 9.80 million American viewers during its initial airing. Viewership and ratings were down significantly from those of the previous episode, "Original Song", which was watched by 11.15 million American viewers and acquired a 4.2/13 rating/share in the 18–49 demographic upon first airing. It was the most-watched scripted show for the week of broadcast amongst adults aged 18–49, and ranked 16th amongst all viewers.

The episode's Canadian broadcast, also on April 19, 2011, attained 1.74 million viewers and ranked ninth for the week. It registered a slight decline on "Original Song", which was viewed by 1.81 million, but also ranked ninth. In the UK, the episode was broadcast on May 2, 2011, and was watched by 2.44 million viewers (1.92 million on E4, and 520,000 on E4+1), becoming the most-watched show on E4 and E4+1 for the week, and the third most-watched show on cable for the week. Broadcast on May 4, 2011, in Australia, the episode attained 943,000 viewers and ranked tenth for the night.

=== Critical response ===
"A Night of Neglect" received generally negative reviews. Erica Futterman of Rolling Stone deemed it a "very predictable episode", which neglected to take risks with its musical numbers and left her with a "stale feeling". Sandra Gonzalez of Entertainment Weekly was confused by the message presented. She approved of the Will–Emma plot and Holly's departure, but was dismayed by the lack of Kurt and Blaine, and criticized Mercedes' storyline for its repetitive nature.

The Washington Post's Lisa de Moraes lambasted the League of Doom plot, which, she wrote, consisted of "[two characters] whom viewers will barely remember, one who is super creepy, and another who fans despised". She suggested that they were included for contractual, rather than storyline reasons, though lauded Jackson's talent for "stealing every scene he's in." Futterman also praised Jackson's "long-overdue return".

"It's nice to see Amber Riley, Harry Shum Jr. and Jenna Ushkowitz get a chance to perform, but making a spectacle out of it does nothing but point out the show's mistreatment of these characters outside of such special showcases. For example, the show doesn't address the fact that the three cast members selected for solos on "The Night of Neglect" were all visible minorities, and what that 'neglect' might mean to the series' racial diversity; addressing this would require subtlety the show can't muster, three-dimensionality these characters lack, and consistency that seems futile at this stage in the series development"

— Myles McNutt of The A.V. Club

CNN's Lisa Respers France said the episode failed to meet her expectations. She was concerned that Mercedes' plot may lead towards the character becoming unlikeable, and criticized Holly's sudden departure. Though she enjoyed Sunshine's return, seeing Kurt and Blaine at McKinley and Mercedes' solo, she noted "all of those moments were fleeting and only contributed to the uneven feel of the show." Amy Reiter of the Los Angeles Times called it a "quirky mixed bag, packed with amusing bits and pieces but very little emotional (or musical) oomph.".

Myles McNutt of The A.V. Club graded the episode "C". He suggested that its purpose was to address two criticisms of the show: the under-use of its supporting cast members, and the "maniacal behavior" of Sue. McNutt wrote, "not only was the execution on these endeavors spotty at best and outright obnoxious at worst, but the growing futility of continuity in this series renders any and all developments wholly temporary. This episode was not a step in the right direction so much as it was an escalator to nowhere: A week from now, the chances of any of this resonating in the show itself are slim to none." He felt that Mercedes had become a prop, rather than a character, and criticized the episode for attributing her blame for the marginalization the writers have subjected her to.

MTV's Aly Semigran enjoyed the comedy and conclusion of Holly's plot, in what she deemed a "pretty decent" episode, though she found Charice's appearance extraneous. IGN's Robert Canning gave "A Night of Neglect" 8.5/10, and called it "a bright and funny installment". He too praised the comedy storylines, particularly the League of Doom plot and the academic decathlon scenes, as: "it's this type of off-topic shenanigans (read: not about fitting in or Rachel Berry becoming a star) that breathes refreshing life into Glee and keeps reminding us how funny and entertaining this series can be." He was less impressed with the benefit concert, which he felt harmed the episode's pacing, and as with Gonzalez, found the nature of Mercedes' storyline repetitive.

==== Musical performances ====
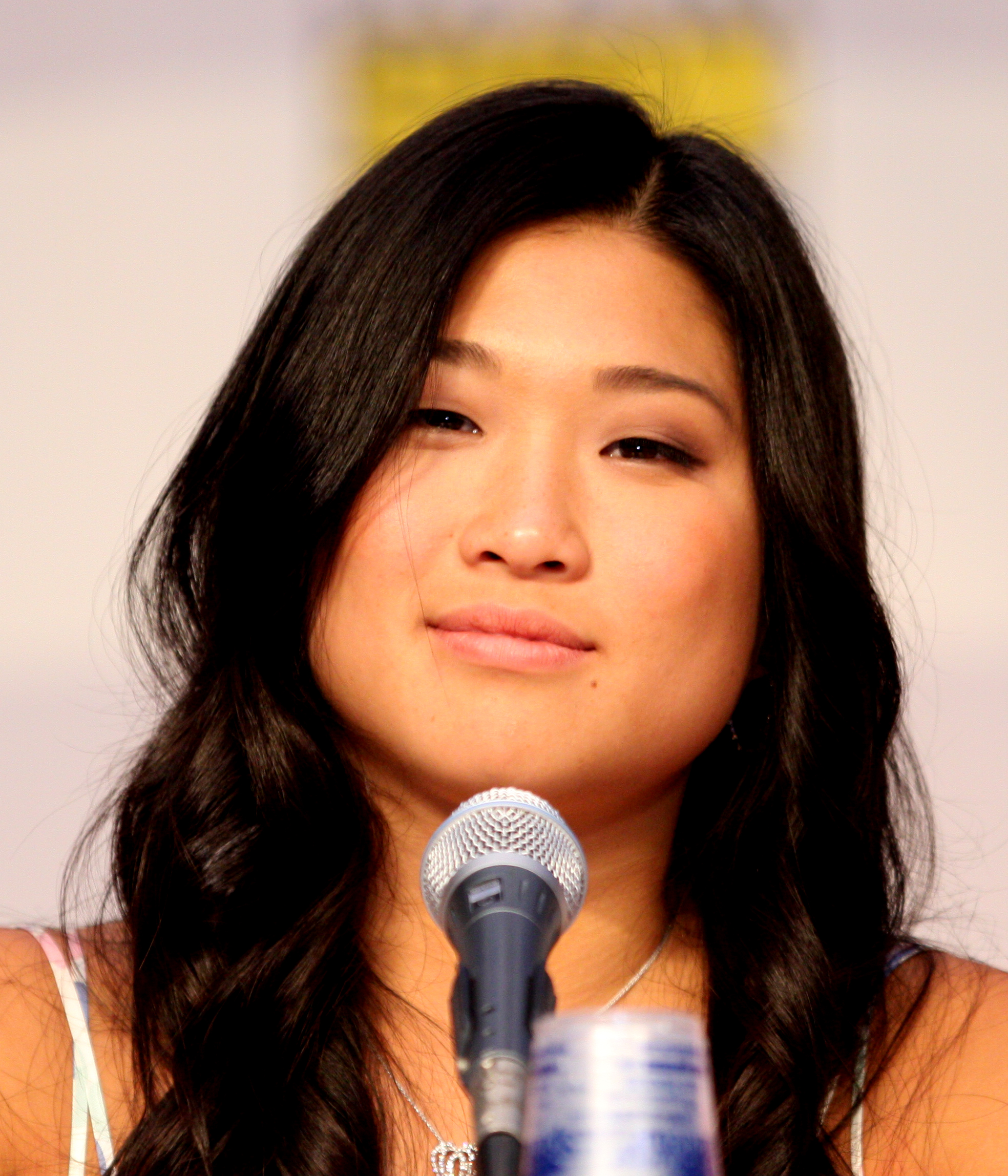
The episode was criticized for, once again, cutting down a solo by Tina (Jenna Ushkowitz, pictured).

Musical performance in the episode, which Entertainment Weekly's Emily Exton observed failed to fit the "neglected" criteria, also attracted mixed reviews. Futterman wrote that Charice "pulled out all the stops", with her cover of "All By Myself", which reached "power notes [that provided] a viable threat to Rachel and Mercedes' diva singing". The Wall Street Journal's Raymund Flandez commended her vocal "control and efficiency belying her young age", Semigran called it a "stirring rendition", and Gonzalez gave it an "A", her joint highest grade of the episode. Her second "A" was awarded to "Bubble Toes", which she called "one of the best [performances] of the season." Semigran concurred, "[Mike's] dancing is awesome."

Critics disapproved of the continuing trend of cutting short Tina's solos. Gonzalez gave her rendition of "I Follow Rivers" a "B" and commented: "Will Tina ever get to finish a song? Well, judging by the 20 seconds we saw, she certainly deserves to." Futterman called her performance "mostly spot-on", and TVLine's Michael Slezak pointed out: "Why is it that every time Tina sings—remember her sobbing "My Funny Valentine"—things end weirdly? I wish we'd gotten a little more vocal and a little less booing in an episode about the club's underappreciated talents." Exton suggested, "Maybe she'll get a chance to do a non-comedic relief song in its entirety by season 5?" Flandez disliked her performance; he commented that she sounded "like a flailing white swan, a poor man's Bjork."

Holly's performance of "Turning Tables" was considered inferior to the original. Futterman named it her least-favorite of Paltrow's covers to date and said that her vocals "lacked the texture that made Adele's version so heartbreaking." Gonzalez gave it her lowest grade of the episode, a "B−", and Semigran opined that while Paltrow is "a nice enough singer," she "in no way has the chops" the song requires. While Flandez called it a "scene-stealing turn" and commended it visually and vocally, he noted that Paltrow lacks Adele's veracity.

Mercedes' "Ain't No Way" was named the best performance of the episode by both Futterman, who enjoyed her "powerhouse vocals". Flandez described the number as being "glamorously sung like [the] star she is", and hoped that she would be better used in the future. In contrast, Reiter called it "a restrained rendition", but "prettily sung nonetheless", and Gonzalez struggled to connect with the "uncharacteristically average" song, though noted that for Mercedes that is "still 10 times better than a normal person" and awarded it a "B+".
