= Turning Tables =

Single by Adele

from the album 21
- Released: 5 November 2011
- Studio: Sphere Studios (London): Germano Studios The Hit Factory (New York City)
- Genre: Orchestral pop
- Length: 4:10
- Label: XL; Columbia
- Songwriters: Adele Adkins; Ryan Tedder
- Producer: Jim Abbiss

Adele singles chronology
"Rumour Has It" (2011)	"Turning Tables" (2011)	"Skyfall" (2012)

Live video
- "Turning Tables" on YouTube

"Turning Tables" is a song recorded by English singer-songwriter Adele for her second studio album, 21 (2011). Conceived after an altercation with her former lover, the song was co-written by Adele and singer-songwriter Ryan Tedder, whilst the production was completed by Jim Abbiss. "Turning Tables" is a pop ballad with a soulful sound; its instrumentation consists of piano, "Broadway-worthy" strings, and guitar. Lyrically, the song describes a domestic dispute in which its narrator assumes a defensive stance against a manipulative ex-lover. XL Recordings sent the song to UK mainstream radio on 5 November 2011 as the fifth single from 21.

"Turning Tables" received acclaim from music critics, who praised its lyrics, production, and Adele's vocal performance. The song reached the top-twenty of the singles charts in four countries, including Belgium, Italy and the Netherlands. It also peaked at number 62 on the UK Singles Chart and 63 on the US Billboard Hot 100 chart. It was certified gold by the Recording Industry Association of America (RIAA) for selling over 500,000 digital downloads. Adele performed "Turning Tables" on television shows such as Late Night with David Letterman in the US and The Jonathan Ross Show in the UK and included it on the Adele Live concert tour. American actress and singer Gwyneth Paltrow performed a cover of the single in the Glee episode "A Night of Neglect".

== Background ==
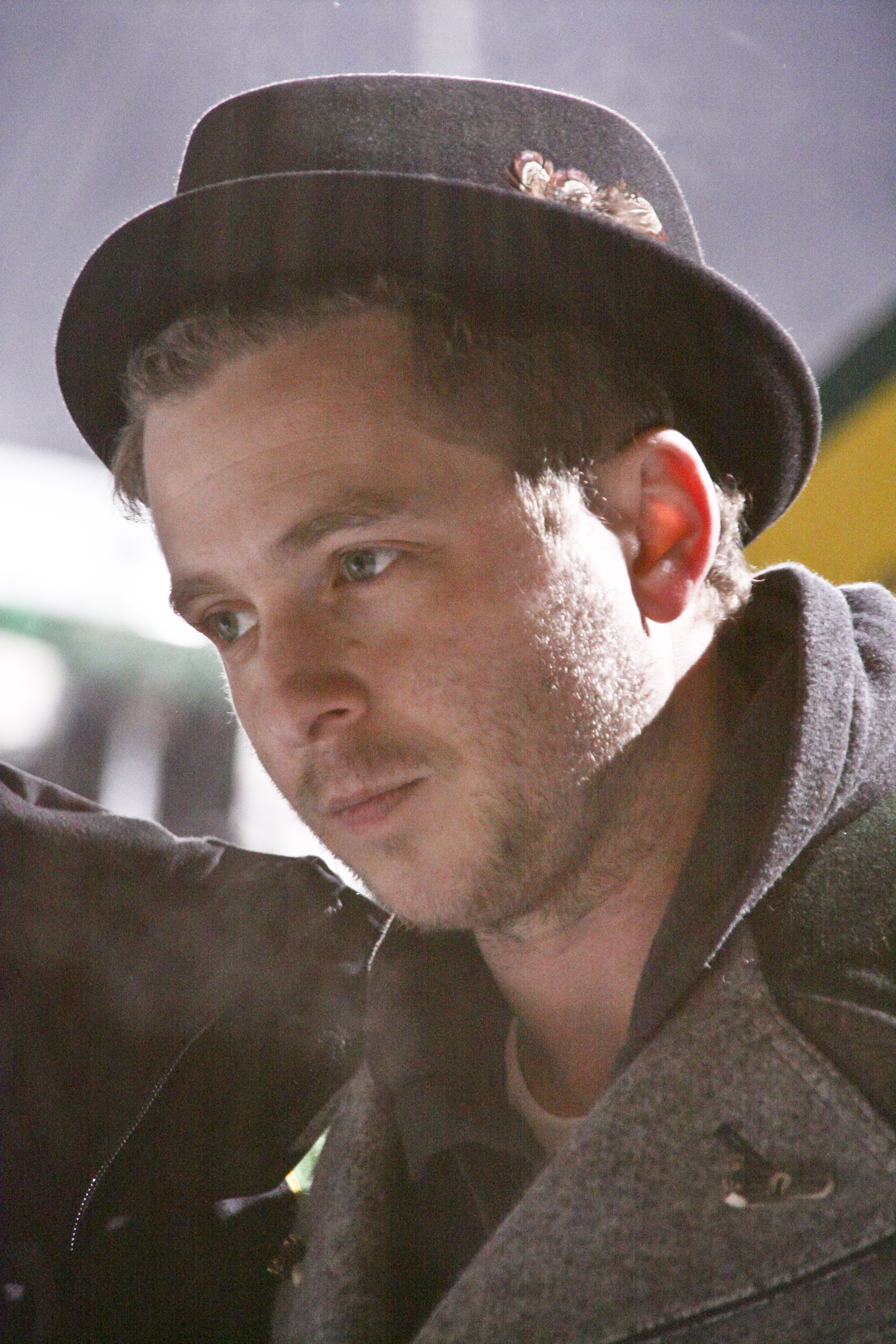
Ryan Tedder co-wrote "Turning Tables" alongside Adele.

In April 2009, 20-year-old Adele, who had recently embarked on her first serious relationship with a man 10 years her senior, began composing the follow-up to her 2008 debut album 19. In response to the media's typecasting her as an "old soul" due to the vintage production and sentimental nature of her songs, Adele decided on a more upbeat and contemporary second album. However, studio sessions were generally unproductive and, after two weeks, yielded only one song recorded to the singer's satisfaction—the Jim Abbiss-produced "Take It All", a lovelorn piano ballad not unlike the songs on 19. Disillusioned with her lack of inspiration and the slow progress of the studio sessions, she cancelled the remaining recording dates. Adele had written "Take It All" during a difficult moment in her relationship. When she played the song for her boyfriend, the two got into a bitter argument that culminated in the end of their 18-month relationship. Heartbroken but musically stimulated, the singer channelled her rush of emotions into her music, crafting songs that examined her failed relationship from the perspectives of vengeful ex-lover, heartbroken victim, and nostalgic old flame.

After several recording sessions with writers and producers like Paul Epworth, Fraser T Smith and Rick Rubin, Adele got enough material for creating a full LP. She released her second studio album on 19 January 2011 under the title 21. Adele first intended to title the album Rolling in the Deep, her adaptation of the slang phrase "roll deep", which summarises how she felt about her relationship; in her loose translation, the phrase refers to having someone "that has your back" and always supports you. However, the singer later deemed the title too confusing for some of her audiences. Although she had wanted to avoid the number motif of her debut, Adele considered "21" the most fitting title as it represented her age at the time of the album's composition, serving as an autobiographical period piece, and symbolised the personal maturity and artistic evolution since her debut.

== Writing, production and release ==
"Turning Tables" was written by American singer-songwriter and frontman of pop-rock band OneRepublic, Ryan Tedder and Adele herself. The production of the song was helmed by Jim Abbiss. When the demos to two songs were completed, Adele approached Tedder, who was in London at the time for a radio show. Tedder had expressed interest in collaborating with the singer after they met at the 2009 Grammy Awards ceremony in February. He arrived four hours early to their first studio session held at Sphere Studios in London, buying time to better familiarise himself with some of her previous work. Although unaware of Adele's personal predicament, he composed the opening piano sequence and first few lines of "Turning Tables".

Coincidentally, it perfectly captured the experience of the singer, who arrived at the studio moments after another altercation with her former lover. Angry and unfocused, she denounced her ex-lover's tendency to "turn the tables" on her during their arguments, an expression that Tedder decided to reference in the song's lyrics. Adele recorded the demo with Abbis the following day. "Turning Tables" was mixed by Abbiss and Ian Dowling. Neil Cowley played the piano in the song, while the string arrangement was made by Chris Elliot. The strings were played by Patrick Kernan, Stephen Morris, Tom Pigott-Smith, Julian Leaper, Boguslaw Kostecki, Bruce White, Peter Lale, Rachel Stephanie Bolt, David Danels, Caroline Dale, Warren Zelnski, Jackie Shave, Chris Laurence, Rita Manning, Cathy Thompson, Emlyn Singleton and Chris Worsey. XL Recordings serviced the song to UK mainstream radio on 5 November 2011 as fifth single from 21 alongside "Rumour Has It". On 14 December 2011, the song was sent for airplay to Italian radio stations.

== Composition ==
"Turning Tables"
A sample of "Turning Tables," whose chorus consists of the lyrics "So I won't let you / Close enough to hurt me / No, I won't rescue / You to just desert me / I can't give you / The heart you think you gave me / It's time to say goodbye / To turning tables."

"Turning Tables" is a pop ballad with a soulful sound that lasts for four minutes and 10 seconds. John Murphy of musicOMH recognized the single as a fragile piano ballad which shows off Adele's voice to its best effect. Sputnikmusic's Joseph Viney described the song as a delicate ballad that possesses an astonishing beauty. Its instrumentation consists of piano, "Broadway-worthy" strings and guitar. According to the digital sheet music published by Sony/ATV Music Publishing, "Turning Tables" is written in the key of C minor and set in common time, with 78 beats per minute. The song accompaniment uses the Seventh and Ninth chords and follows Two Chord Progressions and a Bridge(Passage) Progression of progression #1: Cm7(i7)-A♭M9(VI M9)-Fm9(iv9)-A♭(VI),Bridge progression: A♭(VI)-Fm7(iv7)-A♭(VI)-B♭(VII), Progression #2:Cm7(i7)-A♭M9(VI M9)-E♭(III)-Fm(iv). Adele's vocal range spans from the low note of G_{3} to the high note of C_{5}.

Lyrically, "Turning Tables" is a song of domestic dispute, where its narrator assumes a defensive stance against a manipulative ex-lover. Reconciling herself with the termination of a contentious relationship, she vows emotional distance to shield herself from future heartbreak. Bryan Boyd of The Irish Times likened the singer to 1980s Welsh rocker Bonnie Tyler in delivering the vocals with a mixture of anger, pain and pathos. According to Paste magazine, cinematic strings "serve as fitting counterpoint to [the song's] heartbroken, hollowed-out lyrics." "Turning Tables" opens with a piano sequence after which Adele sings the first lines: "Close enough to start a war/All that I have is on the floor". The chorus consists of the lyrics: "So I won't let you / Close enough to hurt me / No, I won't rescue / You to just desert me / I can't give you / The heart you think you gave me / It's time to say goodbye / To turning tables."

== Reception ==
=== Critical ===
"Turning Tables" received acclaim from music critics. Ian Walker of the website AbsolutePunk commented that the song "contains some of the album's greatest vocal moments, further cementing Adele's reputation as a competent vocalist showing no signs of stopping." A writer from the Daily Herald said that Adele sounds "epic" on the song. Entertainment Weekly's Leah Greenblatt found a "scorned-woman balladry" in the song. Greg Kot of the Chicago Tribune found a "piano-based melancholy" in the song. A reviewer of HauteThought wrote that "Adele's natural ease and original tone shines in Turning Tables. The song allows her to explore her upper register without ignoring the lower, soulful sound she always seems able create." Lily Moayeri stated that on the "barely contained 'Turning Tables', Adele lets forth her formidable lungpower." Ryan Reed of Paste called the single "tearjerking", while Margaret Wappler of Los Angeles Times labeled the song as "softly sentimental".

=== Commercial ===
"Turning Tables" debuted at its peak of number 63 on the US Billboard Hot 100 for the issue dated 7 May 2011. The next week, the song dropped 22 places to number 85 and became the biggest fall of the week. The single stayed on the chart for total of three weeks and was certified gold by the Recording Industry Association of America (RIAA) for selling over 500,000 digital copies. As of May 2015 "Turning Tables" has sold 883,000 digital downloads in the US alone. On the Canadian Hot 100, the song debuted at number 60 for the issue dated 7 May 2011. It fell to number 91 the next week becoming the biggest fall of the week. "Turning Tables" was certified platinum by Music Canada for sales and streams of over 80,000 units. In the UK, it entered the singles chart at its peak of number 62 on 14 May 2011. On 21 May 2011 "Turning Tables" dropped to number 80, before falling off the chart the next week. On 17 September 2011 the song re-entered the UK Singles Chart at number 68. It was more successful on Belgium Ultratip singles chart where it reached number two in Wallonia and number four in Flanders. "Turning Tables" debuted at number nine on the Italian Singles Chart on 19 January 2012. After three weeks on the chart, the song reached its peak of number eight on 16 February 2012.

== Live performances and covers ==
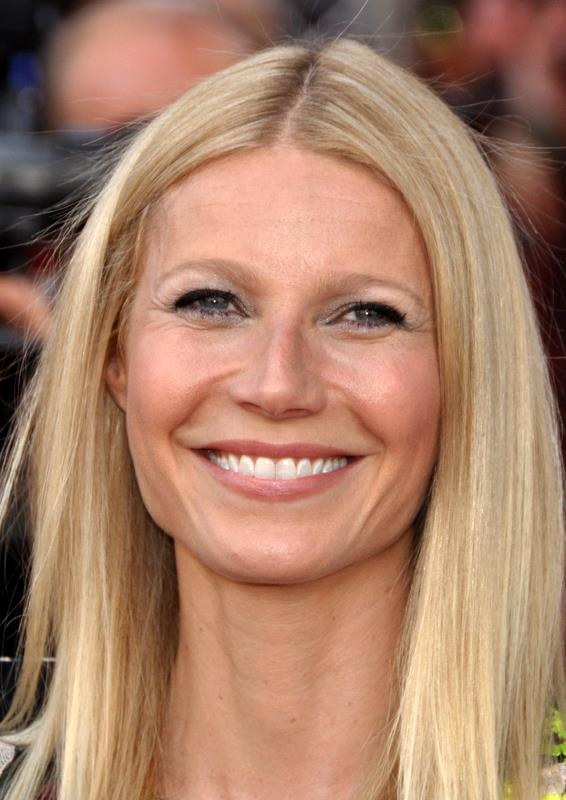
In 2011, Gwyneth Paltrow performed a cover of "Turning Tables" in the Glee episode "A Night of Neglect".

Adele performed "Turning Tables" at Live at Largo in Los Angeles on 9 February 2011. Robie Daw of Idolator recognized the performance as "intimate" and commented that it featured Adele's soulful vocals simply accompanied by "haunting" piano chords. She performed the single on VH1 Unplugged on 3 March 2011. Adele performed the song at Late Night with David Letterman; the performance was later uploaded to her Vevo account on YouTube. On 4 September 2011, the singer performed "Turning Tables" at the premiere of The Jonathan Ross Show and was also interviewed. "Turning Tables" was part of the set list on Adele's second concert tour entitled Adele Live (2011). On 22 November 2011, Adele unveiled a video of her performance of the song from the concert held at the Royal Albert Hall in London. The performance was later included in her first video album Live at the Royal Albert Hall which was released on 25 November 2011. Adele described the concert as the most special show that she would ever play. Adele performed the song on 27 January 2012 at Live from the Artists Den. During the performance the singer stated: "Nothing in life moves me as much as being on stage does. I love the closeness of playing in small rooms, and this room was lovely and simple, just beautiful."

"Turning Tables" was covered by American actress and singer Gwyneth Paltrow, in the "A Night of Neglect" episode of the Fox Broadcasting Company television show Glee. Her performance of the song was considered inferior to the original. Erica Futterman of Rolling Stone named it her least-favorite of Paltrow's covers to date and said that her vocals "lacked the texture that made Adele's version so heartbreaking." Sandra Gonzalez of Entertainment Weekly gave it her lowest grade of the episode, a "B−", and Aly Semigran of MTV opined that while Paltrow is "a nice enough singer," she "in no way has the chops" the song requires. Whilst The Wall Street Journal's Raymund Flandez called it a "scene-stealing turn" and commended it visually and vocally, he noted that Paltrow lacks Adele's veracity. Released as a single, this version peaked at number 66 on US Billboard Hot 100 and Canadian Hot 100. As of 2 July 2012, the Glee version had sold 113,000 paid downloads in the US alone. Co-writer of the song Ryan Tedder performed the song at Denver's Acoustic Christmas (a charity concert hosted by all Colorado artists) with his band OneRepublic in 2011.

As the song boomed, there has been many covers made on Turning Tables from various artists. Various representations of this song in different versions have been trending in the UK and other countries as well.

== Credits and personnel ==
Credits adapted from the liner notes of 21, XL Recordings.

Recording

- Recorded at Sphere Studios, London, United Kingdom

Personnel

- Lead vocals – Adele
- Songwriting – Adele Adkins, Ryan Tedder
- Record producer – Jim Abbiss
- Mixing – Jim Abbiss, Ian Dowling
- Piano – Neil Cowley
- String section arranged by – Chris Elliott
- Strings performed by – Patrick Kernan, Stephen Morris, Tom Pigott-Smith, Julian Leaper, Boguslaw Kostecki, Bruce White, Peter Lale, Rachel Stephanie Bolt, David Daniels, Caroline Dale, Warren Zielinski, Jackie Shave, Chris Laurence, Rita Manning, Cathy Thompson, Emlyn Singleton, Chris Worsey

== Usage in media ==
On April 22, 2019, South Korean channel JTBC used "Turnings Table" as its closing song for the day's JTBC Newsroom—the evening newscast on the channel.

== Charts ==
=== Weekly charts ===
Chart (2011–2013)	Peak position
Australia (ARIA)	34
Belgium (Ultratip Bubbling Under Flanders)	4
Belgium (Ultratip Bubbling Under Wallonia)	2
Canada Hot 100 (Billboard)	60
Germany (GfK)	85
Israel International Airplay (Media Forest)	3
Italy (FIMI)	8
Netherlands (Dutch Top 40)	15
Netherlands (Single Top 100)	45
Scottish Singles Sales (Official Charts)	51
South Korea International Singles (Gaon)	62
UK Singles (Official Charts)	62
US Billboard Hot 100	63
US Latin Pop Airplay (Billboard)	20

=== Year-end charts ===
Chart (2012)	Position
Netherlands (Dutch Top 40)	64

== Certifications ==
Region	Certification	Certified units/sales
Australia (ARIA)	Gold	35,000^{^}
Brazil (Pro-Música Brasil)	Platinum	60,000^{‡}
Canada (Music Canada)	Platinum	80,000^{‡}
Denmark (IFPI Danmark)	Gold	45,000^{‡}
Italy (FIMI)	Platinum	30,000^{*}
New Zealand (RMNZ)	2× Platinum	60,000^{‡}
South Korea (Circle Chart)	—	50,200
United Kingdom (BPI)	Platinum	600,000^{‡}
United States (RIAA)	Gold	883,000
^{*} Sales figures based on certification alone.^{^} Shipments figures based on certification alone.^{‡} Sales+streaming figures based on certification alone.

== Release history ==
Region	Date	Format	Label
United Kingdom	5 November 2011	Mainstream radio	XL
Italy	14 December 2011	Airplay	XL

== Sources ==
- Adkins, Adele (2011). "Adele 21 Track by Track Interview". adele.tv. Archived from the original on 23 September 2011.
