= Mike Chang =

Fictional character from the Fox series Glee

- Glee character
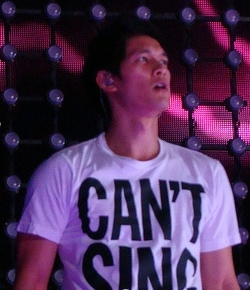
- Harry Shum Jr. as Mike Chang during Glee Live! In Concert! wearing his "Can't Sing" T-shirt
- First appearance: "Preggers" (2009)
- Last appearance: "Dreams Come True" (2015)
- Created by: Ryan Murphy; Brad Falchuk; Ian Brennan
- Portrayed by: Harry Shum Jr.

In-universe information
- Occupation: High school student (graduated); Dancer
- Family: Michael Chang, Sr. (father); Julia Chang (mother)
- Significant other: Tina Cohen-Chang

Michael Robert Chang Jr. is a fictional character from the Fox musical comedy-drama series Glee. The character is portrayed by actor and dancer Harry Shum Jr., and has appeared on Glee since the fourth episode in the first season, "Preggers", first broadcast on September 23, 2009. Glee follows the trials of the New Directions glee club at the fictional William McKinley High School in the town of Lima, Ohio, of which Mike is a member. He is introduced as a football player who joins the club together with a few of his teammates, and quickly shows himself to be an excellent dancer, being the best ones in the group along with Brittany Pierce. His character is slowly developed throughout the series, pairing him with Tina Cohen-Chang in the second season. He was promoted to the main cast in the third season with a prominent storyline in his senior year. He reverts to the recurring cast in the fifth season and final season.

== Storylines ==
Mike first appears in the episode "Preggers" as a member of the McKinley High football team. He dances to "Single Ladies (Put a Ring on It)" by Beyoncé with Kurt Hummel (Chris Colfer) and his fellow high school football players, and subsequently decides to join the New Directions glee club with his friends and teammates Matt (Dijon Talton) and Puck (Mark Salling). Mike is a very talented dancer, able to perform complicated pop-n-lock dance steps, and he is shown singing background vocals and performing short dance solos in the glee club's musical numbers. In the final episode of season one, Mike says that before New Directions, "I was afraid to dance outside my room." Over the summer, Mike and Tina are both arts counselors at "Asian Camp", where they kiss and start dating. He gets his first vocal solo in the episode "Duets" when he performs "Sing!" from A Chorus Line with Tina, and is selected to perform a dance routine with Brittany (Heather Morris) for Sectionals. Their constant rehearsing worries Tina, who mistakenly fears that she is losing Mike to Brittany; she later apologizes to him for her doubts. He performs the show's first solo dance routine in "A Night of Neglect".

Over the summer, Tina and Mike have sexual intercourse for the first time, with Tina subsequently deeming their encounter wonderful as it was with the boy she loved. Mike states that he is a senior in the season three premiere, "The Purple Piano Project". After he receives an "A−" on a chemistry exam, his father (Keong Sim) is upset by this "Asian F" and the danger it poses to his chances of attending Harvard, and insists that Mike focus more on his studies and give up glee club and his girlfriend, who has been helping him improve his singing. Mike begs for one more chance and promises to meet with a tutor, but later decides to follow his dreams and auditions for the role of Riff in West Side Story, performing "Cool". He misses a tutoring session and is confronted by his mother (Tamlyn Tomita), and when he admits he wants to be a dancer rather than a doctor, she reveals that she gave up dreams of becoming a dancer and does not want her son to do the same. Mike's father confronts him about his participation in West Side Story, and Mike tells him he wants to be a professional dancer, not a doctor. Mike is briefly disowned by his father, though he later comes to understand Mike's desire to become a dancer after Tina gives him a recording of West Side Story and he attends the Sectionals to watch Mike perform. Mike receives a scholarship to attend Joffrey Ballet school in Chicago, and graduates from McKinley at the end of the season. He and Tina are still a couple at the end of the year, but she breaks up with him over the summer.

Mike has returned to McKinley several times, usually to attend a reunion or help out Finn and Artie with New Directions. Following his break-up with Tina, they meet again when he and Mercedes Jones (Amber Riley) return at Artie's request to help run auditions for Grease. She was largely hostile to his presence and avoided him, even forgoing the audition because she could not stand being in the same room as him. They eventually rekindle their friendship and remain friends.

== Development ==
Mike is played by Harry Shum Jr. He has also been portrayed as a very young boy by Evan Kishiyama in the episode "The Substitute". When Shum was hired, he had been through the audition process, but as far as he knew "it was just like a regular acting gig where you go on for a day." In an interview with the New York Post, he elaborated, "I got hired as a day player and it turned into a week, and then a month and so on. I was just rolling with it—I mean, who would say no to that?" Mike performed in the glee club's production numbers, but was given very little dialogue, staying mostly "in the background, doing some facial expressions." Shum noted, "It wasn't until I came on the Glee Live! In Concert! tour and had this crazy reaction from the audience, and the producers were like, 'Wow, how do they know him?'" Mike is a senior in the third season of the show. Glee co-creator Ryan Murphy has stated that, due to graduation, "more characters are leaving than are staying" at the end of the season. Mike's parents are dealing with his college plans and appear on the show in "Asian F" to this end, and may be recurring characters.

Mike was slowly developed from a football player who "was afraid to dance outside [his] room" to a confident and highly skilled dancer and performer. Little was revealed about him during the first season of Glee, though Shum described Mike halfway through that season as a "shy football player" with "dancing and singing abilities" who has "found a place where he can express himself and feel accepted." He was given his first storylines in the show's second season. Mike began dating Tina Cohen-Chang (Jenna Ushkowitz), was revealed to lack confidence in his singing early in the season, and although his confidence gets a boost after that, he goes as far as to wear a T-shirt that says he "can't sing" in the episode "Born This Way". Although he sometimes fools around in academic classes, he is also very intelligent, and is a member of the school's academic decathlon team. Indeed, his grades are so good that his father becomes alarmed when Mike gets an "A−" on a chemistry exam, as that could harm his chances of getting into Harvard. Mike Chang is of Chinese American descent, and his great-grandmother was originally from Hubei province in China.

== Musical performances ==
In the first season, Mike only appeared in numbers performed by the entire glee club. He had no solos or other vocal leads, though his dancing was featured in a few numbers. His only vocal lead in the second season was in the episode "Duets", when he performed "Sing!" from A Chorus Line with his girlfriend, Tina. Both Aly Semigran of MTV and Anthony Benigno of the Daily News named the piece as their favorite routine of the episode, though Benigno gave it only a "B" grade, as its appeal hinged on Mike's dancing, rather than his vocal performance. Vanity Fair's Brett Berk gave it four stars out of five, his highest rating of the episode; it was one of two songs to get that rating. Though Raymund Flandez of The Wall Street Journal and the Houston Chronicle's Bobby Hankinson also commented positively on the song, the former thought that Tina's sung interjections became annoying and the latter called it "far from the best of the evening".

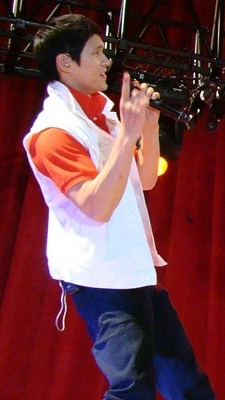
Harry Shum, Jr. as Mike during Glee Live! In Concert!

In the third season, Mike sings his first solo in the episode "Asian F" when he auditions for the school musical, West Side Story, by singing one of its song, "Cool". His performance of it has received positive reviews by critics. Billboard's Rae Votta wrote of "Cool" that "for Mike Chang's first solo it's impressive", and added, "maybe he should play Tony instead of Blaine"; Michael Slezak of TVLine also thought he should have been considered for Tony since it was "performed with such verve and swagger and charisma". Even so, he conceded that Mike (and Shum) was "not the strongest singer", an assessment echoed in the "decent singer" characterizations from Vicki Hyman of The Star-Ledger and BuddyTV's John Kubicek, and the former called the performance a fine job while the latter wrote that "Mike Chang is the total package". The Wall Street Journal's Raymund Flandez said Mike's singing "wasn't so terrible", but while Lee said his is "not, by any means, a wonderful voice" she also said "he still pirouettes with the kind of easy grace that makes each move a joy to watch." Erica Futterman of Rolling Stone wrote, "He's got the smooth dance moves down ... but, most impressively, his slick vocals are on point, hitting nice rises and falls at certain moments but mostly staying 'real cool', as the song calls for", and Berk gave the performance five of five stars.

In "Heart", he sings "L-O-V-E" with Tina, which received mostly positive reviews. The Washington Post's Jen Chaney characterized it as "cute and buoyant" and gave it an "A−", and HuffPost TV's Crystal Bell called it "absolute perfection". While Michael Slezak of TVLine praised their "sweet vocals", he wondered why their "rare moment in the spotlight had to serve as a backdrop to the Artie-Sugar-Rory triangle" and gave the performance a "B". Chaney thought the "quick edits actually gave the song a nice energy, but also prevented us from seeing more of Tina and Mike dancing", which she said "was a shame". Raymund Flandez of The Wall Street Journal and Entertainment Weekly's Joseph Brannigan Lynch both praised Mike's singing; Lynch said his "voice sounded great", and Flandez declared that "Mike has really come into his own as a singer".

== Reception ==
Mike has received generally positive reviews from critics mainly for his dancing. In the second-season episode "Special Education", when he and Brittany (Heather Morris) are given featured dance roles in the song "Valerie", sung by Santana (Naya Rivera), Flandez wrote that "Brittany and Mike's pas de deux rocked". Benigno stated, "Brittany and Mike Chang handle the moves (extraordinarily well), but the vocals here are what steal it", and gave the song an "A". Entertainment Weekly's Tim Stack was slightly less generous with an "A−", and wrote that it was a "great song choice for Santana"; he gave "bonus points for the phenomenal Mike/Brittany choreography", while Jen Harper of BuddyTV said that their dancing "totally made the song". Zap2it's Hanh Nguyen liked the dancing, but she was critical of how the song sounded, as she felt "it lacked something and didn't really feel worthy of the standing O", while Futterman said "Santana's sassy vocals are a perfect echo of Winehouse's, but the rest of the song feels a bit like a circus". Amy Reiter of the Los Angeles Times felt the entire song "seemed kind of tacked on", both the dancing and Santana's solo. In the episode "A Night of Neglect", when Mike performs the show's first solo dance routine—to the song "Bubble Toes" by Jack Johnson—he garnered some rave reviews, including from Sandra Gonzalez of Entertainment Weekly, who gave it an "A" and called it "one of the best [performances] of the season." Semigran concurred, and characterized Mike's dancing in the number as "awesome".

In the season three episode "Asian F", Mike Chang has his first major storyline which became the most widely praised storyline of the episode. Abby West of Entertainment Weekly said Shum "really showed his acting chops", and Samantha Urban of The Dallas Morning News thought the "plot worked well", though she heaped scorn on the notion that "any college would consider glee club a detriment" in an application. Mike's "Cool" performance was very well received. Berk called it a "spectacular audition" and Bell said it was "one of the highlights of the episode"; she also noted that the episode "really solidified" Mike and Tina's relationship, though she also pointed out that Tina was "the most neglected member of the entire cast". Mike's scenes in the dance studio were even more highly praised than "Cool". The first, when Mike "dances alone and imagines Tina and his dad in the room with him" was described as "really beautiful" by Benigno for The Faster Times. The Atlantic's Kevin Fallon characterized it as "a standout scene": "the performer dances out his life frustrations, pirouetting-as-catharsis until he realizes that the only place he feels happy is on stage. It's a trademark Glee moment." Hyman agreed, and wrote, "When he ducked into the studio and started dancing by himself, without music, it reminded me of how special a show Glee can be". Lesley Goldberg of The Hollywood Reporter lauded the subsequent scene in the studio with his mother as the "most touching part" of the storyline, and more than one reviewer admitted shedding tears, including Reiter.

Critics reacted less positive towards his scenes in The First Time. The scene where he is disowned by his father was characterized as "weird" and "tonally off" by Emily St. James of The A.V. Club and "abrupt and unlikely" by Hyman. Kubicek was even more critical: "the most over-the-top, terribly cliched scene ever". However, Votta gave "kudos to Glee for sticking with Mike's story this season as he figures out his path", and West wrote that Shum "played it well", while Robert Canning of IGN said it and the later scene with his mother "were mighty effective, if a bit stereotypical". Hyman and West also approved of the latter scene.

After "Hold On to Sixteen", Sullivan, who was enthusiastic about Shum, who he said had "emerged as a crux of the show", was not happy with Mike's "forced storyline" in the episode. Canning noted that Mike's storyline had "been a bit cliched all season", though it had been "fun to root for him", but he was puzzled by the lack of a "Mike Chang dance showcase" at the competition to justify his father's change of heart.
