= Tina Cohen-Chang =

Fictional character from the Fox series Glee

- Glee character
- Jenna Ushkowitz as Tina Cohen-Chang in Glee
- First appearance: "Pilot" (2009)
- Last appearance: "Dreams Come True" (2015)
- Created by: Ryan Murphy; Brad Falchuk; Ian Brennan
- Portrayed by: Jenna Ushkowitz

In-universe information
- Occupation: Actress
- Significant others: Artie Abrams; Mike Chang

Tina Cohen-Chang is a fictional character from the Fox musical comedy-drama series Glee. The character is portrayed by actress Jenna Ushkowitz and has appeared in Glee from its pilot episode, first broadcast on May 19, 2009. Tina was developed by Glee creators Ryan Murphy, Brad Falchuk and Ian Brennan. Initially, she is a shy and insecure performer with a fake stutter, and member of the glee club at the fictional William McKinley High School in Lima, Ohio, where the show is set. As the series progressed, she became more independent and confident.

== Storylines ==
Tina auditions for the glee club with the song "I Kissed a Girl" by Katy Perry. Throughout the episode it is made clear that she speaks with a stutter. Her first solo performance as part of the club is "Tonight" from West Side Story. Fellow club member Rachel Berry (Lea Michele) had wanted the solo for herself and quits New Directions in protest. Tina feels bad that she caused Rachel to quit, but Mr. Schuester continues to support her. Tina goes on a date with Artie Abrams (Kevin McHale) and confesses to him that she has been faking her speech impediment since the sixth grade. She explains that as a painfully shy girl, she had wanted to drive others away. However, she also says, that since she has joined the glee club, she no longer wants to do that. Artie, a paraplegic, is hurt that she faked a disability, as he had thought that they had a connection. After a few months, Artie forgives Tina but makes sexist comments about her appearance, suggesting that she should begin wearing more revealing clothes if she wants to be with him. Tina shouts at him, prompting Artie to apologize and the two reunite. In the episode "Dream On", Tina tries to help Artie achieve his dream, which is to dance; but it proves to be an impractical endeavor. During a vampire craze at McKinley in the "Theatricality" episode, Principal Figgins bans Tina's gothic wardrobe. After dressing like Lady Gaga, she learns to be theatrical and scares Figgins into letting her wear her regular clothing by dressing as a vampire, which Figgins seems to believe is real.

The season two premiere, "Audition", exposes that over the summer, Tina began dating Mike Chang (Harry Shum, Jr.). She cites Artie's poor and occasionally chauvinistic treatment of her as her boyfriend; she and Mike had grown closer as camp counselors together at "Asian Camp". She and Mike had the longest-lasting continuous relationship on the show, and she reveals in the third-season episode "The First Time" that she and Mike had first slept together over the summer—she describes it as magical. Tina helps Mike with his singing; with her tutelage, he's able to get the part of Riff in McKinley's West Side Story. After Rachel gets suspended from school in time for Sectionals, Tina leads "ABC" alongside Mike on second lead; New Directions wins. In "Props", when New Directions starts planning a set list for the impending Nationals competition, Tina becomes frustrated because Rachel is again singing lead while she remains stuck in the background. Tina walks out. When Rachel tries to bribe her to withdraw her objections, she tells Rachel that she wants to experience a standing ovation of her own. Tina later falls into a fountain and strikes her head, which causes her to experience a vision in which all of the glee club members have switched roles—most notably, she sees herself as Rachel and Rachel as her. "Rachel" performs "Because You Loved Me", and the club gives her a standing ovation. She thanks "Tina" for her support, and "Tina" in turn gives "Rachel" advice on how to salvage her failed NYADA audition. After Tina comes back to reality, she conveys that advice to Rachel.

In the fourth season premiere, "The New Rachel", Tina develops a new sassy personality while it's revealed that she broke up with Mike during the summer after his graduation. She wants to become the lead singer of New Directions, as Rachel had promised her, and competes with Brittany Pierce (Heather Morris), Blaine (Darren Criss), and Unique (Alex Newell), but Blaine is picked instead. She later refuses to try out for the school musical, Grease, when Mike returns to help cast and choreograph it, not wanting to spend time with him, but ultimately accepts the role of Jan. Tina develops an infatuation on her gay, fellow New Directions' member, Blaine. Oblivious to her affections, Tina struggles with her unrequited love, but after a while Tina gets over her crush on Blaine and joins him to buy an engagement ring for Kurt. Tina and Blaine remain best friends.

In season five, Tina is nominated for prom queen in "Tina in the Sky with Diamonds" and works to win the title, hiring Dottie Kazatori (Pamela Chan) as an assistant and dumping Sam as her prom date in order to win the single girl vote. Tina wins prom queen, but she is emotionally wrecked when a new cheerleader, Bree (Erinn Westbrook), dumps a bucket of slushies on her, in similar fashion to the movie Carrie. Kitty Wilde (Becca Tobin) gives Tina her dress and Tina goes back to stage in glory with the glee club's encouragement. And like all the members of glee club, Tina is devastated and heartbroken when Finn Hudson (Cory Monteith) suddenly dies. In "Trio", she is caught by Blaine when she and Sam Evans (Chord Overstreet) make out in a classroom after the school is closed. She spends her last days of high school doing activities with fellow glee club seniors Blaine, Artie, and Sam Evans. She graduates with them in the middle of season five and goes to study at Brown University. Later, she visits New York to attend Rachel's opening night in Funny Girl on Broadway.

In the final season, Tina and the other glee club alumni returns to help Rachel recruit new members for the newly rebooted glee club. She and Quinn Fabray (Dianna Agron) helps Becky convince her new boyfriend that she is in every club of the school. She, Quinn, Sue, and Coach Roz get a huge surprise when they find out that Becky's boyfriend, Darrell, does not have Down syndrome like Becky does. They all get a big lesson when they confront him and realize that a person with Down syndrome should be treated like everyone else. In "A Wedding", Tina tries to propose to Mike, and is rejected. It is revealed that Tina joins the glee club because she and Artie were playing truth or dare with their goth friends in the Pilot's parallel episode "2009". In the series finale, she starred in Artie's film that got into Slamdance Film Festival and now officially a couple with Artie. She attends the rededication to the McKinley's auditorium to the late Finn Hudson. She performs one last time with almost every member of New Directions from all seasons and take a bow with the rest of the Glee Cast.

== Development ==
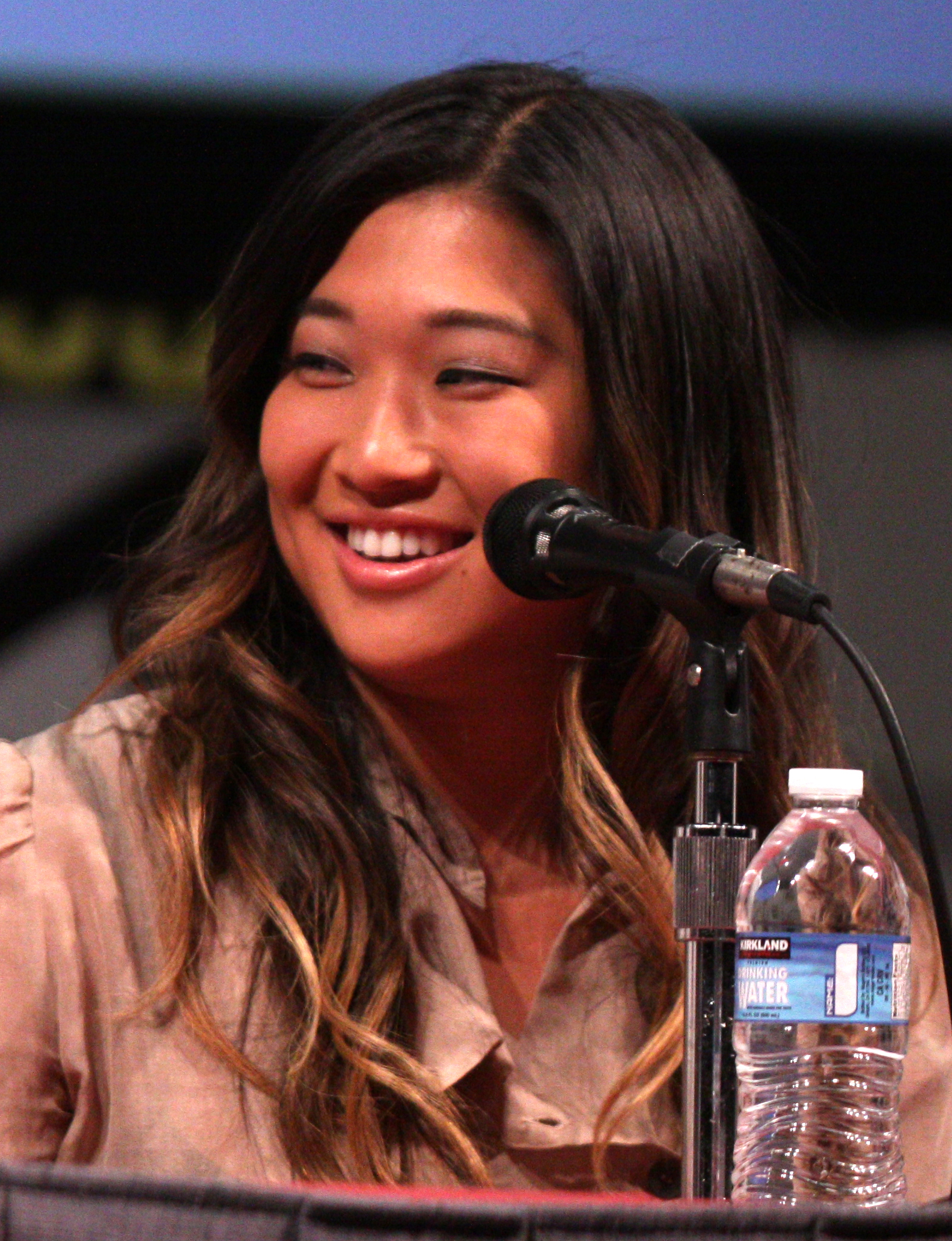
Ushkowitz (pictured) was found by series creator Ryan Murphy on Broadway, rather than through a traditional casting call.

In casting Glee, series creator Ryan Murphy sought out actors who could identify with the rush of starring in theatrical roles. Instead of using traditional network casting calls, he spent three months on Broadway, where he found Ushkowitz, who had previously starred in the Broadway revival of The King and I. The Glee casting associate in New York had previously cast Ushkowitz in Spring Awakening.

Ushkowitz was initially given little information about Tina's backstory and believed that her stutter was real. She was pleased when the truth was revealed, however, explaining: "It would have been fun to keep it because that just gives her one more quirk, but this opens up a whole new set of doors for Tina." Ushkowitz has created her own backstory for Tina, and believes that she is rebelling against her mother rather than genuinely being a Goth, explaining: "I don't think her room is filled with dark posters and heavy metal stuff—I just think this is a phase she's going through. There's definitely a lot of options for all the characters to evolve and change next year. I'm totally rooting for Tina to join The Cheerios or something crazy like that."

Ushkowitz is close to her co–star Kevin McHale, and the two of them are in support of the relationship between their characters, referred to by the portmanteau "Artina", for Artie and Tina. McHale described Artie and Tina's relationship as being similar to the one between Cory (Ben Savage) and Topanga (Danielle Fishel) in the ABC comedy–drama Boy Meets World, and believes they will always be together. The two characters did break up between seasons one and two, and they did not reconcile throughout season three.

Although a number of the student cast members were seniors in the third season and graduated when it ended it was stated at the 2011 San Diego Comic-Con that Tina will be a junior, and hence not graduating with them. Before the third season's debut in September 2011, Murphy said that Tina's role would increase in that season.

== Musical performances ==
Glee's cover of Cyndi Lauper's "True Colors", featuring Ushkowitz as Tina on lead vocals, was released as a single, available for digital download, and was included on the soundtrack album Glee: The Music, Volume 2. Zap2it writer Liz Pardue was pleased with the solo, and Raymund Flandez of The Wall Street Journal hailed the track as showcasing Ushkowitz's "strong crystalline voice". Gerrick D. Kennedy, writing for the Los Angeles Times, wrote that the "poignant" rendition was one of his "feel-good, tearjerker moments". The version charted at number 47 on the Australian Singles Chart, 38 on the Canadian Hot 100, 15 on the Irish Singles Chart, 35 on the UK Singles Chart, and 66 on the United States' Billboard Hot 100.

Tina and Mike share a duet of "Sing!" in the second-season episode "Duets", which was Aly Semigran of MTV and Anthony Benigno of the Daily News favorite routine of the episode, though Benigno gave it a "B" grade, as its appeal hinged on Mike's dancing. Vanity Fair's Brett Berk gave it four stars out of five, his highest rating of the episode. Though Flandez and the Houston Chronicle's Bobby Hankinson also commented positively on the song, the former thought that Tina's sung interjections became annoying and the latter called it "far from the best of the evening". "Sing!" debuted at number 87 on the Hot 100, and also made number 67 on the Canadian Hot 100.

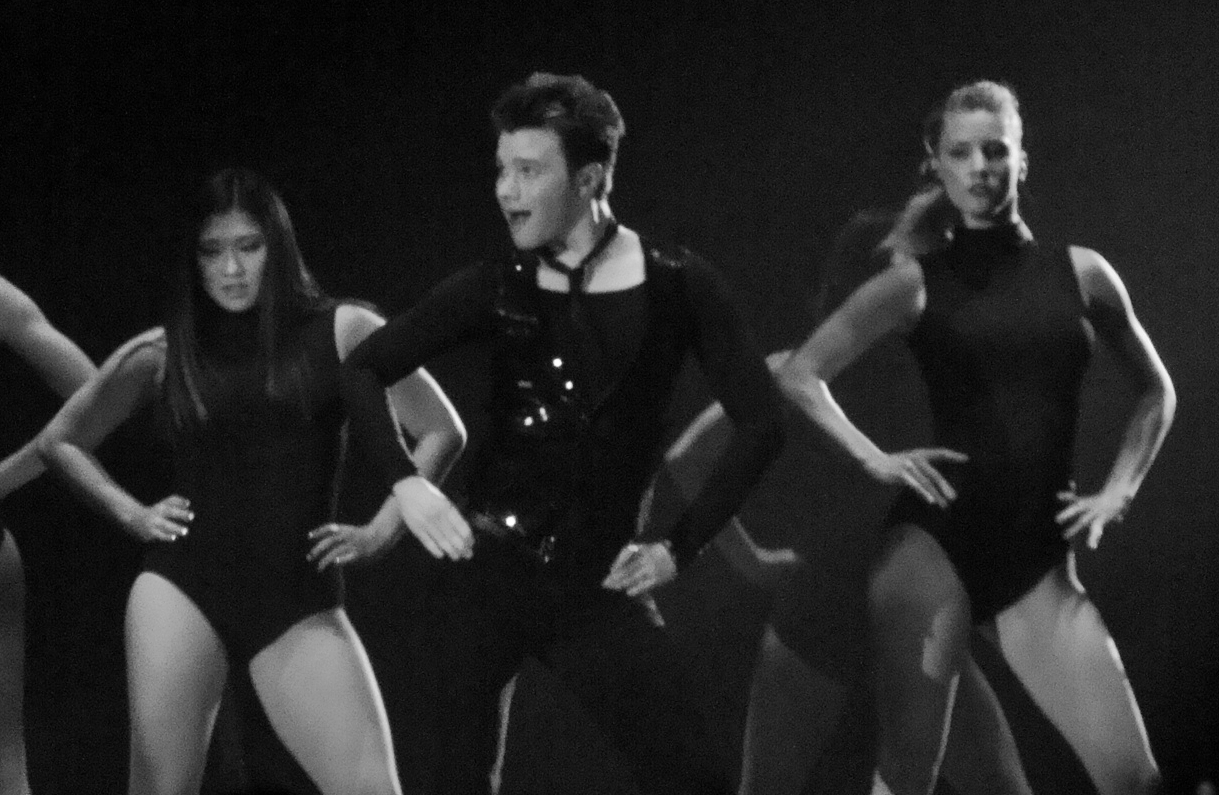
Ushkowitz, Chris Colfer and Heather Morris during a performance of "Single Ladies" on the tour Glee Live! In Concert! in 2011

"Special Education"'s concluding number, a cover version of "Dog Days Are Over" with lead vocals by Ushkowitz and Amber Riley, was favored as its musical highlight. Hankinson said that the performance conveys "the exact brand of high-energy jubilation that I love the most," and Jen Harper of BuddyTV was similarly impressed. Semigran characterized the decision to have Ushkowitz and Riley perform lead vocals as "unconventional (but oddly fitting)" and named the cover "a winner", while The A.V. Club contributor Emily VanDerWerff wrote that show "hits the song out of the park". Benigno gave the song a "B+", and Entertainment Weekly's Tim Stack gave it an "A", and said series creator Ryan Murphy "chose the perfect gals to pull off this cover". The rendition debuted at number 22 on both the Hot 100 and Canadian Hot 100, and pushed the original version of the song by Florence and the Machine ahead of it to number 21 on the Hot 100, up from number 58 in the previous week.

The series' version of "ABC" by The Jackson 5 in the third season "Hold On to Sixteen" episode, featuring Ushkowitz as one of the leads, was singled out for demonstrating "what a lovely singer Tina is" by Billboard's Rae Votta, and BuddyTV editor John Kubicek said he enjoyed it "mostly because Tina deserves more singing time". It entered the Hot 100 at number 88, and the Canadian Hot 100 at 93. Tina sings L-O-V-E with Mike in the "Heart" episode, which The Washington Post's Jen Chaney characterized as "cute and buoyant" and gave an "A−", and HuffPost TV's Crystal Bell called "absolute perfection". Michael Slezak of TVLine praised their "sweet vocals" and gave the performance a "B".

Céline Dion's "Because You Loved Me", featured in the "Props" episode, performed by Tina as Rachel received positive reviews. Both Chaney, who gave the song an "A−", and Entertainment Weekly's Erin Strecker, who graded it a "B+", stated their belief that the real Rachel would have done it better, and MTV's Jyll Saskin was more blunt: "We love you, Tina, but you just can't belt like Rachel". Rolling Stone journalist Erica Futterman was the most pleased, and wrote: "The richness of her voice removes some of the Lite FM softness embedded in the tune, and it really is great to see Tina get a song that suits her vocal abilities". Futterman said of Michele and Ushkowitz's "Flashdance... What a Feeling": "there was a glimmer of old-school Glee in the performance, carefree underdog status that made me smile". Saskin and Chaney both found the performance lacking; the former wrote that "something about this version falls flat", and Chaney gave it a "B−" and said it "wasn't as soaring as it could have been", though "Rachel and Tina's bonding moment was sweet". Slezak and Strecker both gave the performance an "A−".

== Reception ==
By the season one "Dream On" episode, Entertainment Weekly writer Tim Stack considered Tina "still such a mystery to me," having not "much of an emotional connection to her", and expressed hope that the character's role would increase in the following season. Following the broadcast of "Theatricality", "Asian Vampires" became the fifth most discussed topic on the social networking website Twitter, in reference to Tina's storyline. Although he was "pleasantly surprised" by the "Theatricality" episode, James Poniewozik of Time found the Tina subplot in it "ridiculous and dispensable". Writing for The Stir, Brittany Drye asked "Is Glee racist?", and cited several moments in the episode "Audition" which could be perceived as racist. She highlighted the pairing of Tina and Mike (noting their shared surname, "Chang") and the joke of Jacob Ben Israel (Josh Sussman) assuming they are a couple because they are both Asian. However, Drye speculated that in attempting "self-aware racism" the show was intentionally trying to point out the inanity of racist beliefs and concluded that Glee's self-awareness in this matter was its saving grace. The "A Night of Neglect" episode was criticized for, once again, cutting down a solo by Tina. Sandra Gonzalez of Entertainment Weekly commented, "Will Tina ever get to finish a song? Well, judging by the 20 seconds we saw, she certainly deserves to." Futterman called the short performance "mostly spot-on", and Slezak pointed out: "Why is it that every time Tina sings—remember her sobbing "My Funny Valentine"—things end weirdly? I wish we'd gotten a little more vocal and a little less booing in an episode about the club's underappreciated talents." Entertainment Weekly's Emily Exton suggested, "Maybe she'll get a chance to do a non-comedic relief song in its entirety by season 5?" Myles McNutt of The A.V. Club graded the episode "C" and wrote,

"It's nice to see Amber Riley, Harry Shum Jr. and Jenna Ushkowitz get a chance to perform, but making a spectacle out of it does nothing but point out the show's mistreatment of these characters outside of such special showcases. For example, the show doesn't address the fact that the three cast members selected for solos on "The Night of Neglect" were all visible minorities, and what that 'neglect' might mean to the series' racial diversity; addressing this would require subtlety the show can't muster, three-dimensionality these characters lack, and consistency that seems futile at this stage in the series development".

Reviewing the third season debut episode, The Dallas Morning News's Samantha Urban noted that Murphy failed to deliver on his promise to increase Tina's roles. By the season three "Asian F" episode, Bell said that Mike and Tina's relationship was "really solidified", though she also pointed out that Tina was "the most neglected member of the entire cast". "Props", an episode that centered on Tina's neglect, was said to "winkingly acknowledged fan complaints that Ryan Murphy & Co. all too often ignore some of Glee's original players in favor of new and more-hyped flavors" by Slezak. Votta said, "It felt organically Glee, zany but with heart." E! Online's Jenna Mullins thought its body-swap sequence "breathed fresh 'n' crazy air into Glee", and Kubicek called it "the best thing Glee has ever done and will ever do". Saskin said it was "super trippy, makes no sense plot-wise" and was a "totally awesome Glee moment". VanDerWerff, however, described it as a "totally odd curiosity that comes out of nowhere", and said that the car trip taken by Tina and Rachel later in the episode was more successful at showing Tina "what Rachel's life is like". Kubicek called the offer of the trip and subsequent drive a "sweet bonding moment" between the pair, and called it "great" that "Tina is the one who saves the day" at the meeting with Carmen.
