= Oh Honey (band) =

American indie pop band

- Origin: Brooklyn, New York, U.S.
- Genres: Folk pop; indie pop
- Years active: 2013–2016
- Labels: Fueled by Ramen; Atlantic
- Members: Mitchy Collins; Danielle Bouchard
- Website: www.ohhoneymusic.com Archived November 12, 2018, at the Wayback Machine

Oh Honey was an American indie pop band from Brooklyn, New York, formed by singer-songwriters Mitchy Collins and Danni Bouchard. Their touring live band consisted of drummer Rob Ernst, guitarist Ian Holubiak, and bassist Shaun Savage. Oh Honey described itself as a blend of folk pop, indie pop, and pop music.

== History ==
Mitchy Collins started Oh Honey as a project following his associations with the Kin and Outasight. Looking for a female vocalist, he met Danni Bouchard through a mutual friend.

Oh Honey began recording in Brooklyn, NY as a group in April 2013, releasing its first single in September 2013. The band is named after both the "Oh Honey" episode of How I Met Your Mother and the artisan, rooftop honey production movement in Brooklyn. Oh Honey's EP, With Love, was released independently in November 2013 and was well-reviewed.

In December 2013, Oh Honey worked with Orange Is the New Black stars Danielle Brooks and Uzo Aduba to create a Christmas medley. Throughout the end of 2013 and the start of 2014, the single "Be Okay" gained quick and steady acclaim, being covered on Glee on the March 25, 2014, episode titled "New Directions".

After signing to Atlantic Records in February 2014 via its Fueled by Ramen imprint, Oh Honey set up three tours as the opening act to James Blunt, the Fray, and American Authors, and played at SXSW. The EP With Love was re-released under the Atlantic Records label on March 25, 2014. On August 12, 2014, Oh Honey released an EP of remixes of "Be Okay".

In the fall of 2014, "Be Okay" was featured in national commercials for The Hundred-Foot Journey, the new ABC show Selfie, and the Chili's restaurant chain. On October 11, 2014, Oh Honey released a second EP of original music titled Sincerely Yours. The band indicated that 4 EPs, With Love, Sincerely Yours, Wish You Were Here and the unreleased Until Next Time would culminate as a full series called Postcards; however, this did not materialize.

Oh Honey cited its influences from a number of sources including Ingrid Michaelson, Sara Bareilles, Regina Spektor, Fleetwood Mac and Stevie Nicks, Bon Iver, Bruce Springsteen, and Ryan Adams. Oh Honey's sound has been compared to Of Monsters and Men, American Authors, Sara Bareilles, the Lumineers, and Icona Pop.

After Collins split from Bouchard in 2016 to form Lovelytheband, Bouchard began recording as a solo artist under the name Luxtides.

== Band members ==
Current members

- Mitchy Collins – songwriting, vocals, guitar
- Danni Bouchard – songwriting, vocals, tambourine

Touring musicians

- Ian Holubiak – guitar
- Rob Ernst – drums
- Shaun Savage – bass
- Rob Guariglia – bass
- Chris Greatti – guitar
- Paul Dominic – bass

== Discography ==
=== Extended plays ===
- With Love (2013)
- Be Okay Remixes (2014)
- Sincerely Yours (2014)
- Wish You Were Here (2015)

=== Charting singles ===
Title	Year	Peak chart positions		
Title	Year	US Adult Pop	US Rock Dig.	US Rock
"Be Okay"	2013	25	44	50
