= Be Okay =

Single by Oh Honey

from the EP With Love
- Released: March 25, 2014
- Genre: Folk-pop, indie pop
- Length: 3:19
- Label: Atlantic Records
- Songwriters: Mitchy Collins; Danielle Bouchard; Christian Medice; Phoebe Ryan; Denis Lipari; Larzz Principato

"Be Okay" is a song written and produced by Mitchy Collins, Danielle Bouchard, Christian Medice, Phoebe Ryan, Denis Lipari, and Larzz Principato and recorded by indie pop band Oh Honey. It was re-released in March 2014 as a part of the band's EP With Love (2014).

== Content ==
According to Billboard.com, song is one that mixes an effervescent, melodic chorus with equally upbeat lyrics It was described as a "sun-kissed, feel-good jam that will help you get over your end-of-summer blues" by the Huffington Post.

== Background ==
After releasing their first EP known as With Love in November 2013, which included their first single "Be Okay", things began to move quickly for Oh Honey. SiriusXM added Be Okay to their rotation. Not long after, Atlantic Records found the band and Oh Honey became a part of their record label in February 2014. With Love - EP was re-released on March 25, 2014 under the Atlantic Record label.

== In other media ==
"Be Okay" was featured and covered by Naya Rivera and Lea Michele in "New Directions", the thirteenth episode of Glee's fifth season. It was also featured on an exclusive music video sung along to by the cast of Red Band Society as a preview for the premiere of the show. A short clip of the song can be heard in a Chili's commercial that debuted near the end of 2014.

== Music videos ==
=== Official video ===
The official music video for "Be Okay" was released on November 5, 2013 on Entertainment Tonight Online. On March 10, 2015, the video hit two million views on YouTube.

== Commercial performance ==
"Be Okay" made it onto Billboard's Adult Top 40 chart where it reached number 25. It stayed on the charts for 10 weeks. "Be Okay" was made available for purchase on the iTunes Store on September 19, 2013. It made the top songs playlist.

== Release history ==
Release dates and formats for "Be Okay"
Region	Date	Format	Label(s)	Ref.
United States	April 15, 2014	Mainstream airplay	Atlantic	
