= The Quarterback (Glee) =

- Glee episode
- Past and current New Directions members commemorate the late Finn Hudson.
- Episode no.: Season 5 Episode 3
- Directed by: Brad Falchuk
- Written by: Ryan Murphy; Brad Falchuk; Ian Brennan
- Production code: 5ARC03
- Original air date: October 10, 2013

Guest appearances
- Amber Riley as Mercedes Jones; Mark Salling as Noah "Puck" Puckerman; Jayma Mays as Emma Pillsbury; Harry Shum Jr. as Mike Chang; Mike O'Malley as Burt Hummel; Dot-Marie Jones as Shannon Beiste; Romy Rosemont as Carole Hudson-Hummel; Iqbal Theba as Principal Figgins; Erinn Westbrook as Bree

Episode chronology
← Previous "Tina in the Sky with Diamonds"	Next → "A Katy or a Gaga"
- Glee season 5

"The Quarterback" is the third episode of the fifth season of the American musical television series Glee, and the ninety-first episode overall. Written by all three of the show's creators—Ryan Murphy, Brad Falchuk and Ian Brennan—and directed by Falchuk, it first aired on Fox in the United States on October 10, 2013. The episode features the death of Finn Hudson, and acts as a tribute to his actor, Cory Monteith, who died in July earlier that year. Its plot centers on the impact Finn's death has on the characters, specifically Kurt Hummel (Chris Colfer), Will Schuester (Matthew Morrison), Santana Lopez (Naya Rivera), Noah Puckerman (Mark Salling), and Rachel Berry (Lea Michele).

"The Quarterback" received critical acclaim, though some criticized the lack of clarification of Finn's cause of death. Upon its initial airing, this episode was viewed by 7.40 million American viewers and garnered a 2.9 rating in the 18–49 age group. The total viewership and ratings for this episode were up significantly from the previous episode. It was the show's highest rating since the fourth season episode "Britney 2.0".

== Plot ==
Members of New Directions perform "Seasons of Love" at Finn Hudson's funeral. Three weeks later, they reunite at McKinley High, where director Will Schuester invites them to honor Finn through song, as personal memorials. Mercedes Jones performs "I'll Stand by You", a song Finn previously sang when he believed he was going to become a father. Principal Sue Sylvester allows the students to turn Finn's old locker into a memorial, and plants a tree in his honor, which is later stolen. Kurt Hummel helps his parents sort Finn's belongings, keeping Finn's letterman jacket and giving his father Burt Finn's lamp and football. Carole Hudson-Hummel breaks down in grief and the family comes together to comfort one another.

The next day, the club perform "Fire and Rain". Santana Lopez, unable to cope with her grief, leaves to visit Finn's memorial, only to find a group of Cheerios taking it apart on Sue's orders. Santana accuses Sue of hating Finn and shoves her in anger. Guidance counselor Emma Pillsbury, Will's wife, tells Will she is worried that he is slighting his own feelings. Football coach Shannon Beiste notices that Noah "Puck" Puckerman is continuously drunk following Finn's funeral and confronts him. Puck confesses he feels lost without Finn's guidance, but Beiste reassures that his own instincts will be enough and reveals that she knows Puck stole Finn's tree, which he promises to return.

Santana sings "If I Die Young", but breaks down in hysterics before she can finish. Kurt finds Santana in the auditorium as she regrets not being nicer to Finn. Kurt reassures that Finn cared for her and knew she was a good person, then gives Santana the jacket; Santana accuses Puck of stealing Finn's jacket, which Puck denies. New Directions places drumsticks on Finn's memorial, where they meet Rachel Berry. Santana apologizes to Sue, who reveals she is heartbroken Finn died believing she hated him, then tells Will her doubts that she will return to Lima. Puck replants the tree and reveals to Beiste that he has joined the Air Force to honor Finn's memory. As Puck leaves, Beiste discovers that he had carved the word "Quarterback" into the tree.

Rachel confesses to Will that she still talks to Finn, conveying she was specially uncertain of the future, having planned to have a successful Broadway career and "maybe do a Woody Allen movie" before reuniting with Finn in Lima to spend the rest of their lives together. She gives Will a plaque with Finn's picture and a quote of his, which reads, "The show must go...all over the place...or something.", that Will hangs in the choir room. Later at home, Will reveals that he had took Finn's jacket as he pulls it out of his bag. Emma finds Will weeping while holding the jacket and comforts him as he grieves.

== Production ==
Shooting for the episode, which is set in Lima, Ohio, began on August 23, 2013, in parallel with the previous episode—the second of two Beatles tribute episodes—which had started shooting earlier in the month and continued into the following week with scenes featuring new recurring cast member Demi Lovato.

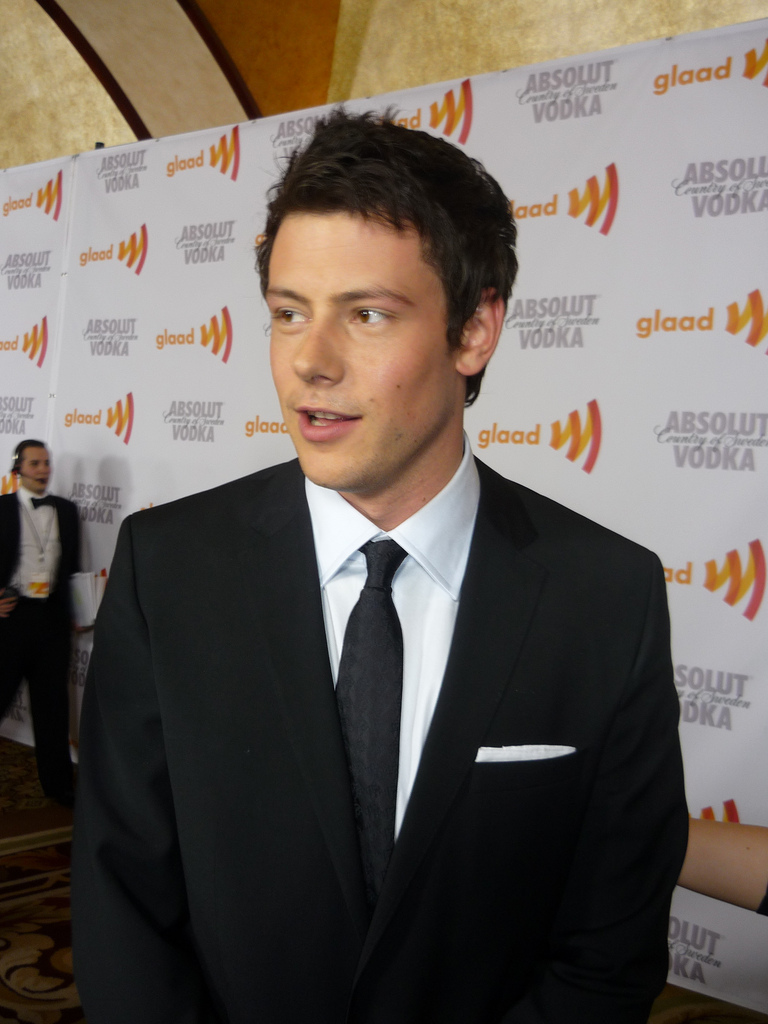
Cory Monteith at the 2010 GLAAD Media Awards

The episode was written by all three of the show's creators—Ryan Murphy, Brad Falchuk and Ian Brennan—and directed by Falchuk. Murphy said that "almost everything in that episode is from the first take of every performance because the actors and the crew had a really hard time shooting it." He added, "I've never seen a crew that you can't continue shooting because they've left the room sobbing." Many cast members called to request that they be included in the episode although they were not under contract to do so, including Iqbal Theba, who plays Figgins on the show, and appears in the episode. The episode was finalized for broadcast—"locked"—on October 3, 2013.

Cory Monteith, who played Finn, was set to return to Glee for the fifth season after having missed the last few episodes of the fourth season while undergoing drug rehabilitation treatment from late March through late April in 2013. At Monteith's request, Finn was to be featured prominently during the season. In the wake of his death, a number of planned story arcs for the season had to be revised or replaced.

Fox President Kevin Reilly told the Television Critics Association on August 1, 2013, that Finn would be written off the show in the season's third episode, and also that the contents might include previously unused footage and outtakes involving the character. The death of Finn is established as the episode begins, though Murphy said that the cause of death would deliberately not be mentioned.

The filming of the episode was "incredibly hard" according to Matthew Morrison, who plays glee club director Will Schuester—"We've mourned Cory, but now we're mourning Finn. So it's kind of like two people in that one person." Kevin McHale, who plays Artie Abrams, noted that some in the cast found it "weird" when they were "having to play reactions that they obviously would not feel in real life"—for example, a number of the characters "aren’t dealing with the loss of Finn" and are in denial, unlike the actors who "were all very much dealing with it."

Reilly said that a series of public service announcements dealing with the topic of drug addiction would be filmed by the Glee cast and creators for airing during this episode. In addition, a fund in Monteith's name was started using the proceeds from the music contained in the episode.

Recurring characters in this episode include former glee club members Mercedes Jones (Amber Riley), Noah "Puck" Puckerman (Mark Salling) and Mike Chang (Harry Shum Jr.), Finn's mother Carole Hudson-Hummel (Romy Rosemont) and stepfather Burt Hummel (Mike O'Malley), McKinley guidance counselor Emma Pillsbury (Jayma Mays), football coach Shannon Beiste (Dot-Marie Jones), McKinley janitor and former principal Figgins (Iqbal Theba), cheerleader Bree (Erinn Westbrook) and McKinley freshman Dottie Kazatori (Pamela Chan).

Six songs from the episode were released as part of the EP Glee: The Quarterback on October 7, 2013. The six featured songs are "Seasons of Love" from Rent performed by members of New Directions past and present, The Pretenders' "I'll Stand by You" sung by Riley, James Taylor's "Fire and Rain" performed by Chord Overstreet and Kevin McHale, The Band Perry's "If I Die Young" sung by Naya Rivera, Bruce Springsteen's "No Surrender" performed by Salling and Adele's cover of Bob Dylan's "Make You Feel My Love" sung by Lea Michele.

== Reception ==
=== Ratings ===
"The Quarterback" drew in 7.4 million viewers and a 2.9 rating among adults 18–49, Glee's best rating in about a year (the show's highest rating since September 20, 2012). It was soaring up 40 percent from season five premiere episode "Love, Love, Love" which drew in 5.06 million viewers, and it was up 75 percent from the previous week's episode "Tina in the Sky with Diamonds," which drew in 4.42 million viewers. Including DVR viewing, the episode was watched by 10.54 million viewers, and received a 4.3 18-49 rating.

In Canada, the episode was watched by 1.38 million viewers, placing fourth for the night and twenty-first for the week.

=== Critical response ===
The episode received critical acclaim. Miranda Wicker of TV Fanatic gave the episode a 5 out of 5, saying "There's really only so much to be said about this episode. It was, in a word, heartbreaking. But it was also sort of perfect in the way that Glee can be when faced with tough moments." She also praised the writers, who in her opinion "met that challenge in the best possible ways."

Allison Keene of The Hollywood Reporter gave a positive review to the episode saying "Ultimately, "The Quarterback" was respectful, and was successful as the cathartic memorial—for both the cast and viewers—that it was intended to be. But beyond anything else that happened in the episode, the real sadness that stays with us about Monteith was said the best, as so many things usually are, by Sue: "It's just so pointless ... all that potential." While noting that Lea Michele's performance was the best, she said that "the most heartbreaking scene was without singing. Kurt, his father Burt (Mike O'Malley), and Finn's mother Carole (Romy Rosemont) all talked about the sadness and tragedy of losing a family member, and the moment when the three of them huddled together on the floor to cry and comfort one another was truly the episode's show-stopper." She also commented positively on Santana's performance of "If I Die Young", calling it "genuinely moving". Lauren Hoffman of Vulture gave the episode a 4 out of 5 saying that "If you want to distill last night's Glee down into two sentences, those (spoken to Puck by Coach Beiste) might be the best ... It's tragic. There's no other word for it." She praised the episode's opening number stating "'Seasons of Love' is the perfect choice to open the episode ... It's the most lovingly mixed track Glee's produced in quite some time ... It's an offering. And a beautiful one at that."

Katy Kroll of Rolling Stone acknowledged the emotional strength of this episode and that "even if you were just a casual viewer or tuned in for the very first time to rubberneck, you probably shed a tear during the emotionally charged special episode". However, she criticized the way the writers left the cause of Finn's death unstated. Rae Votta of Billboard praised the way Glee was able to deal with grief right upfront in a way other TV shows are not able to do, as well as stating: "There's no perfect way to do this sort of an episode, but Glee gave Cory and Finn a heartfelt send-off the way they knew best."

Hank Stuever of the Washington Post was more critical of the episode, noting the show's "erasing Finn", and that the lack of previous footage of him during the episode "undermined the episode's strongest scenes, including one in which Finn's mother, Carole ... broke down in tears while packing her son's bedroom. It also left a little hollow spot in the final minute when Will Schuester ... sobbed in Finn's varsity letter jacket." He did, however, comment positively on the episode's transition from comedic to serious; its song choices; and its overall effect, which "was indeed a sense of finality, particularly as it relates to the fleetingness of fame."

Jeff Jensen of Entertainment Weekly also criticized the episode, specifically the show creators' choice not to address how Finn died, calling it "the most conspicuous and debatable choice made by the Glee creators." He then commented positively on Santana's role and song; and Mike O'Malley and Romy Rosemont's scene; but he was critical of Will Schuester's role in the episode, saying:

I had trouble connecting with Will throughout this episode, and I wondered if Morrison did, too – which, by the way, would be understandable, given the circumstances. (How difficult this thing must have been to make for everyone!) Or maybe disconnection was exactly the emotional point: The irony of Will was that he had been denying his agony even as he was trying to create room for everyone else to enter into theirs. And so he, too, summed up an episode of good intentions and mixed success, that was less a story and more of a loosely structured narrative space to contend with the theme of grief, messy and hard.

Robert Bianco of USA Today gave the episode a mixed review, saying "perhaps it is best to think of Thursday's broadcast as a labor of love, and to presume it worked best for those who are most devoted to the show and its often heady blend of musical flash, after-school-special preachiness and high-and-low humor. It could not have surprised anyone that the episode whipsawed between clashing tones: A scene with Sue spewing out no-one-would-ever-say-that insults crashing up against a that's-how-it-must-feel monologue from Finn's mother about the loss of her child. And if people behaved even more irrationally than usual (would an adult really steal a dead teenager's letter jacket), you can chalk it up to their not being in their right minds." He then concluded, "It's almost impossible to do a story about the death of a teenager that doesn't induce tears, particularly when the plot is tied into the real-life loss of a well-liked young actor. One just wishes the writers had put a bit more trust into that natural response, and not tugged at our heartstrings quite so strenuously." Alessandra Stanley of the New York Times also commented on the absence of an explanation for Finn's death, saying "teens and young adults often die for highly preventable reasons much like Monteith did, and while a drug overdose would have been too on the nose, any of numerous other explanations—from drunk driving to other risky behaviors—would have made this not just a somber sendoff, but a teachable moment to the younger quadrant of the program's audience."

== Music ==
An extended play, Glee: The Quarterback, was released on October 7, 2013, featuring the six songs performed on the episode. On October 16, 2013, it debuted at number 7 on the Billboard 200, selling 47,000 copies. This was the franchise's first album to chart in the top 10 in the US in nearly two years; the last Glee album to chart in the top 10 was Glee: The Music, Volume 7, which charted at number 9. This album was also the fourteenth to chart in the top 10. All the grosses from the downloads on iTunes in the US and Canada were destined to Project Limelight, a charity that Monteith supported.
