= Mercedes Jones =

Fictional character from the Fox series Glee

- Glee character
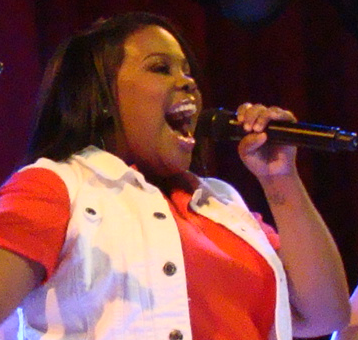
- Amber Riley as Mercedes on the Glee Live! In Concert! tour
- First appearance: "Pilot" (2009)
- Last appearance: "Dreams Come True" (2015)
- Created by: Ryan Murphy; Brad Falchuk; Ian Brennan
- Portrayed by: Amber Riley

In-universe information
- Occupation: High school student (graduated); Recording artist
- Significant others: Shane Tinsley; Sam Evans
- Religion: Christian

Mercedes Jones is a fictional character from the Fox popular musical comedy-drama series Glee. The character is portrayed by actress Amber Riley, and has appeared in Glee from its pilot episode, first broadcast on May 19, 2009. Mercedes was developed by Glee creators Ryan Murphy, Brad Falchuk and Ian Brennan. She is a dynamic diva-in-training who refuses to sing back-up, and is a member of the glee club at the fictional William McKinley High School in Lima, Ohio.

== Storylines ==
=== Season 1 ===
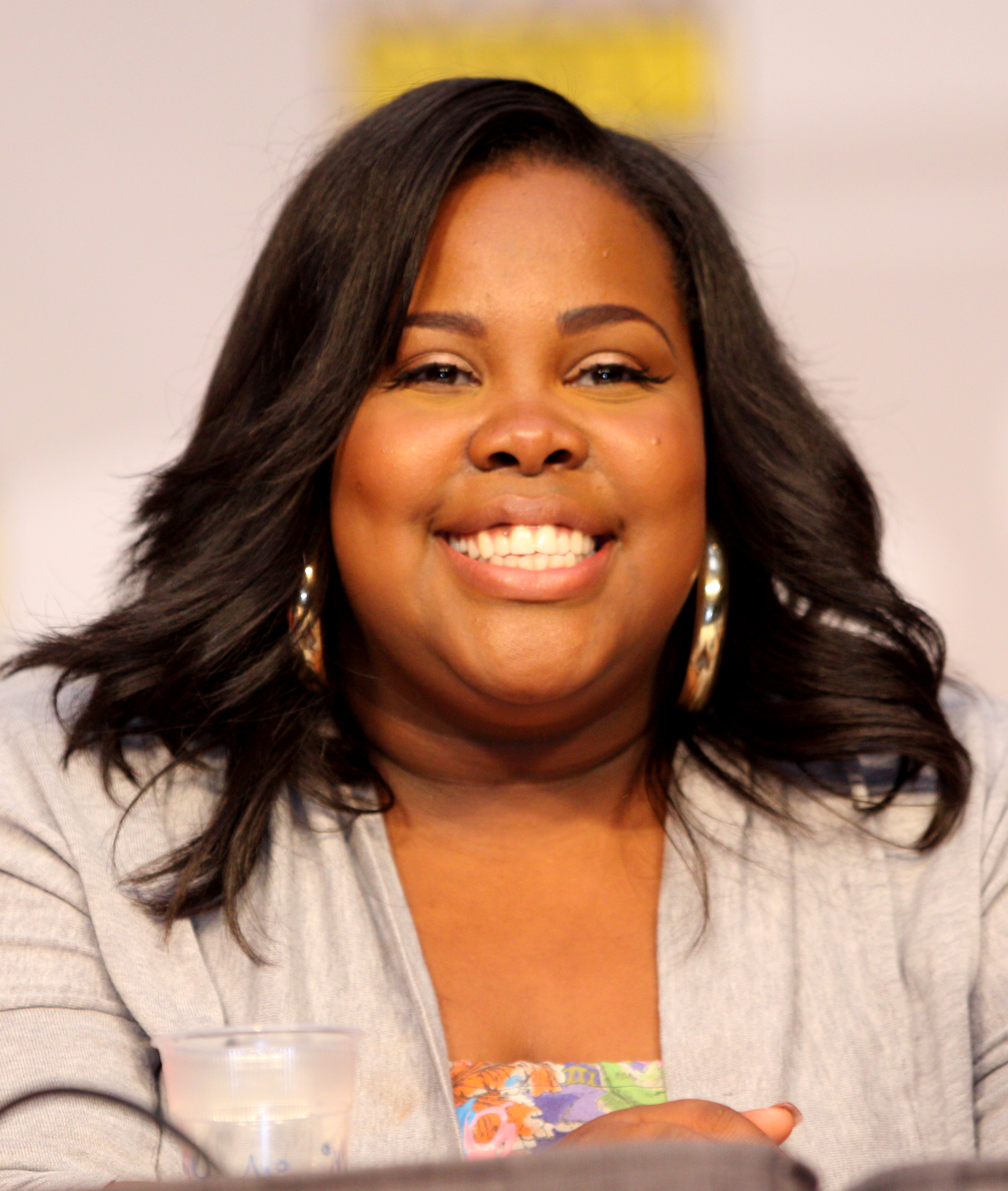
Amber Riley (pictured) plays Mercedes.

Mercedes auditions for the school glee club, New Directions, by performing Aretha Franklin's "Respect". She develops a crush on fellow member Kurt Hummel (Chris Colfer), unaware that he is gay. Though she is hurt when he rejects her, Mercedes is supportive when he confides his sexuality, and they become close friends. Mercedes has a rivalry with glee club co-captain Rachel Berry (Lea Michele), which comes to a head in the episode "Sectionals", when she impresses the club with a rendition of "And I Am Telling You I'm Not Going". Rachel agrees that Mercedes should perform the solo competitively, but she loses the chance when a rival school steals the song.

Frustrated with the lack of solos they receive, Mercedes and Kurt join the school cheerleading squad, the Cheerios, as vocalists. Mercedes struggles when cheerleading coach Sue Sylvester (Jane Lynch) demands that she lose weight. She faints after crash-dieting, and is supported by former Cheerios captain Quinn Fabray (Dianna Agron), who tells her that she is beautiful regardless of her size. Later, during a pep rally, Mercedes sings the song "Beautiful" by Christina Aguilera. Being a member of the Cheerios increases her popularity, and Mercedes briefly dates football player and glee club member Noah Puckerman (Mark Salling). However, she feels that she is being untrue to herself, so she quits the squad and breaks up with Puck. A friendship develops between Mercedes and Quinn; she invites Quinn to live with her family after Quinn's parents evict her for becoming pregnant, and supports her through the birth of her daughter.

=== Season 2 ===
Mercedes' friendship with Kurt is tested when they disagree over religion; Mercedes is a devout Christian, and Kurt an atheist. When his father has a heart attack, Mercedes convinces Kurt to attend church with her, devoting the service to the Hummels and performing "Bridge Over Troubled Water" with her church choir for him. Kurt later develops a strong friendship with Blaine Anderson (Darren Criss), a gay student from another school. He begins to neglect Mercedes, and offends her by trying to set her up with another student. When Sue Sylvester, temporarily Acting Principal, begins a healthy eating initiative at the school and declares a ban on Tater Tots, Mercedes organizes a student protest and fills the tailpipe of Sue's car with Tots, causing $17,000 worth of damage. Kurt suggests that she is substituting food for love and their friendship for a romantic relationship, and Mercedes agrees to talk to the student Kurt attempted to set her up with. She remains romantically unattached, however, and explains to Kurt and Rachel that sometimes it is necessary to choose between love and talent.

Mercedes writes an original song entitled "Hell to the No" to be a contender for the glee club's set list for the Regionals competition; though director Will Schuester (Matthew Morrison) thinks it's a great song, he also doesn't think it's appropriate for the competition. When New Directions plans a benefit concert, Mercedes allows her performance slot to be moved to a less desirable place in the program; club member Lauren Zizes (Ashley Fink) is surprised by her failure to stand up for herself, and offers to be her agent, suggesting that she make diva-like demands to ensure they appreciate her talent. Ultimately, Mercedes takes the closing slot from Rachel by performing an overwhelming rendition of Aretha Franklin's "Ain't No Way" so good that Rachel doesn't even try to follow it. Mercedes attends the junior prom as part of a group with Rachel and fellow New Directions member Sam Evans (Chord Overstreet). In the season two finale episode, "New York", it is revealed that she and Sam have begun secretly dating.

=== Season 3 ===
At the beginning of the third season, Mercedes says that she and Sam had dated for a while, but after he moved out of state she started a relationship with Shane Tinsley, a member of the football team. Shane encourages her to believe in her talent, and she auditions for the role of Maria in the school's production of West Side Story. Both she and Rachel are given callbacks. Mercedes is angry about what she perceives as continued favoritism shown to Rachel, especially in the awarding of solos, and quits glee club. In the audition callbacks, Mercedes gives a performance that Rachel privately concedes was better—Mercedes is sure it is—and when they are both offered the role with half of the performances, she refuses to accept a split role; instead, she joins Shelby Corcoran's (Idina Menzel) rival glee club, and soon has recruited Santana and Brittany away from New Directions into the newly named Troubletones. The Troubletones lose the Sectionals competition to New Directions, and Mercedes and the others rejoin New Directions with the promise that the Troubletones will be given one performance number per competition. Sam returns to McKinley and attempts to rekindle his romance with Mercedes. She still has feelings for him, and eventually breaks up with Shane, though she refuses to date Sam while she is unsure of her true feelings. Sam continues to support her, and a YouTube video he posts of Mercedes singing results in her being offered a job as a backup singer in Los Angeles after she graduates.

=== Season 4 ===
Although still credited as series regular, Mercedes appears less frequently in the fourth season. She usually returns when there is an event in the lives of one of her friends back home in Ohio. She has moved to Los Angeles and is taking classes at UCLA while she works as a backup singer, though she returns to help with the school musical, for Thanksgiving, and for Mr. Schuester's ultimately failed wedding. She also returns in "Wonder-ful" to do a music video for her newly recorded album, but the record deal falls through.

=== Season 5 ===
In season five, she was demoted and credited as a guest star. She returned in the premiere episode "Love, Love, Love" to be present for Blaine's proposal to Kurt, and again for Finn's funeral and memorial in "The Quarterback". She sang "I'll Stand By You" as a tribute to Finn, who had sung it to the sonogram of what he thought was his and Quinn's baby in the first-season episode "Ballad", and later told her about doing so. In "City of Angels", she comes to support the New Directions since the nationals is held in LA, and it's revealed that she has landed a new recording contract. While there, she learns that a dejected Marley Rose has given up songwriting and is considering quitting the New Directions and, having mentored her before for Regionals, convinces her to keep following her dreams. In the special 100th episode, due to their recent success, she and Rachel (who was just cast in a broadway role) starts a rivalry, though they made up with each other in the end as they realize they are equally talented. She moves to New York with fellow glee club graduates for the rest of the season to record her album, and while there, rekindled her romance with Sam. In the season finale, she breaks up with Sam as she realizes she can't make him wait for her to be ready to lose her virginity. She went on a mall tour across the state with her high school friends, Santana Lopez (Naya Rivera) and Brittany Pierce (Heather Morris) as her main back up.

=== Season 6 ===
She was promoted to the main cast again for the final season. She comes back to McKinley with all of the McKinley graduates to try to help Rachel recruit new members for the glee club in the episode "Homecoming". She later tries to convince Rachel to chase her dreams to be on Broadway. In the series finale, Mercedes is going to be Beyoncé's opening act for her upcoming world tour, and gives a tearful farewell to her friends. In 2020, she is headlining her own world tour, and watches Rachel win an award. She attends the McKinley auditorium rededication to Finn Hudson, sings one last song with every former member of New Directions, and takes a final bow with the rest of the Glee cast.

== Musical performances ==
As Mercedes, Riley features in many ensemble musical performances, has had several solos and duets, which have been released as singles, available for download, and included on Glee's soundtrack albums. Her first performance, "Respect" by Aretha Franklin, was included in full on the series' first DVD box set, Glee – Volume 1: Road to Sectionals. In the episode "Acafellas", her performance of Jazmine Sullivan's "Bust Your Windows" was called "showstopping" by Raymund Flandez of The Wall Street Journal. It was included on the album Glee: The Music, Volume 1, and released as a single, which peaked at number 35 in Ireland. Riley recorded a version of Dionne Warwick's "Don't Make Me Over" for the episode "Hairography". It was used as an instrumental within the episode, rather than performed by Mercedes on-screen, but was included in full on Glee: The Music, Volume 2. Her performance of "And I Am Telling You I'm Not Going" in the episode "Sectionals" also features on this album. It peaked at number 85 on the Canadian Hot 100.

The rendition of Aguilera's "Beautiful" in the episode "Home" was called "so forced that it loses any power it might have from what's a genuinely nice arrangement of the song" by Emily VanDerWerff of The A.V. Club, while Tim Stack of Entertainment Weekly wrote that it was "a great moment for not only Amber Riley but for the entire show." The number peaked at 39 in Ireland, and 44 in Canada. Riley duetted with Colfer on "4 Minutes" by Madonna, which was included on the extended play (EP) Glee: The Music, The Power of Madonna, and reached number 32 in Ireland. Additional duets include "The Lady Is a Tramp" by Sammy Davis, Jr. with Puck, and of "The Boy is Mine" by Brandy and Monica with Santana. The former was included on Glee: The Music, Volume 3 Showstoppers, and reached number 72 in Canada, while the latter is featured on the compilation album Glee: The Music, The Complete Season One, and reached 46 in Ireland.

In the second-season episode "Grilled Cheesus", Mercedes performs Whitney Houston's "I Look to You", and led a choral rendition of Aretha Franklin's cover of "Bridge Over Troubled Water". Erica Futterman of Rolling Stone commended Riley's vocals on the latter, and commented that series creator Ryan Murphy should assign Mercedes more solos. MTV's Aly Semigran felt that "I Look to You" was the episode's weakest song, preferring Riley's "more powerful" rendition of "Bridge over Troubled Water". Amy Reiter of the Los Angeles Times expressed disappointment in both numbers, as they left her "strangely unmoved". She suggested that, "Mercedes sang admirably, beautifully even, but she didn’t seem truly transported by the music; so we weren't." "I Look to You" peaked at number 74 in Canada and the U.S., while "Bridge Over Troubled Water" reached 69 and 73 respectively in the same territories. Mercedes later assumed the role of Dr. Frank-N-Furter in the glee club's performance of The Rocky Horror Show, and sang "Sweet Transvestite". The song was included on the EP Glee: The Music, The Rocky Horror Glee Show. Semigran felt that, as sung by a female, the song lost its shock value. Flandez would have preferred Salling's Puck in the role, but praised Riley's vocals, and wrote that her solo "woke us all up from the timid pacing". Anthony Benigno of the New York Daily News also enjoyed the number, and found that while Mercedes lacked the stage presence of Tim Curry, Riley did something "completely remarkable" as Frank, giving a largely flawless performance.

"Hell to the No", Mercedes' original song, was titled for the character's signature catchphrase. Co-written by Glee's music supervisor Adam Anders, composer Peer Åström, and executive producer Ian Brennan, the piece peaked at number 53 on the US Billboard Hot 100. In the episode "A Night of Neglect", she performed another Franklin song, "Ain't No Way". Her final solo of the season was Otis Redding's "Try a Little Tenderness", which was included on the album Glee: The Music, Volume 6. During the season, Mercedes reprised duets with both Santana and Rachel: with the former on Ike & Tina Turner's "River Deep – Mountain High" and ABBA's "Dancing Queen", and with the latter on "Take Me or Leave Me" from the musical Rent. "River Deep, Mountain High" was included on the album Glee: The Music, Volume 4 and peaked at number 30 in Ireland. "Take Me or Leave Me" featured on the following album, Glee: The Music, Volume 5, and reached number 51 in the U.S. "Dancing Queen" appeared on the season's final soundtrack album, Volume 6, and peaked at number 74 in the U.S. Futterman criticized the arrangement of "Dancing Queen" for diluting Riley and Rivera's "power vocals", which, she said, "[gave] them the thin sound of ABBA's original even though they're both much better than that."

Mercedes featured in three of the third season's "Asian F" episode's musical numbers. Flandez said of her solo, "She blew Jennifer Hudson's 'Spotlight' out of this world." Anthony Benigno, writing for The Faster Times, said that it was "great", but added that it was "not much of a stretch for Amber Riley to hit this one". Vanity Fair's Brett Berk praised her "amazing voice" and gave the performance four stars out of five, and The Hollywood Reporter's Lesley Goldberg characterized the rendition as "flawless". Other reviewers were more critical, including VanDerWerff, who said that this was the only song in the episode that "really didn't work". TVLine critic Michael Slezak felt that the arrangement used was not distinct enough from the original, though he gave the performance a "B+", as did Entertainment Weekly writer Abby West, who wrote, "Mercedes looked fantastic and carried herself well, and her voice was as strong as ever but it felt a little lacking." In her "Maria-off" with Rachel, Benigno said they "both kill it", characterized it as "easy but fun", and gave it an "A−", as did Slezak and West, the latter of whom "didn't feel that Mercedes was the clear winner" but thought both singers were "fantastic". BuddyTV's John Kubicek thought that "Mercedes clearly won" and Flandez maintained that she "clearly outshone her rival", and continued, "You just believe so much of what she sings." Berk agreed, and contrasted the two singers with his rating scale of one to five stars: "Two stars for Rachel, who sang this like Barry Manilow; four for Mercedes, who sang this like she lived it." Futterman had a slightly different take: "Rachel puts on a diva front, but inside she's scared and nervous, while Mercedes is just a diva." However, Hyman thought that the two "were evenly matched", while IGN journalist Robert Canning and Billboard's Rae Votta both thought Rachel was the victor; Votta stated, "While the show wants us to believe otherwise, Rachel clearly outsang Mercedes". "It's All Over" from Dreamgirls received the most enthusiastic commentary, including an "A+" from West, who wrote "Mercedes was at her best in this performance", a sentiment echoed by Benigno when he awarded the song an "A". Vicki Hyman of The Star-Ledger called it "pretty awesome" and Flandez a "cleverly amusing take", while Futterman said Mercedes "fully embraces her inner Effie White" and that the song was "on par with the best of Glee's Broadway songs in terms of plot relevancy and vocal arrangements".

The "Mash Off" episode marked the 300th musical number Glee has filmed, which was a mash-up of two Adele songs: "Rumour Has It" and "Someone Like You", with lead vocals by Riley and Rivera. It was acclaimed as its main highlight. Futterman wrote that the performance was one of Glee's best sequences: "Mercedes and Santana nail their vocals and the song combines great tracks from one of the year's biggest albums while capturing both the sass and sadness of the Troubletones at this particular moment." Votta called it the best performance since the cast's rendition of "Don't Stop Believin'" in the season one finale, "Journey to Regionals". Jen Chaney of The Washington Post awarded the sequence a "A+" grade, and Brian Moyler of Gawker asserted that the number was "perfection" and said, "This is why I watch Glee. It is just brilliant from Mercedes first belting to the snaps on the beat to the choreography with the girls walking in a circle and making little whispers to Santana bringing tears to my eyes singing 'Someone Like You' as if it was the last song she'll ever sing in her damn life.". Cinema Blend's Melissa Duko stated that the show "hit it out of the park" and added that it was her favorite performance of the season. TVLine correspondent Michael Slezak gave the number an "A+" and wrote, "Nobody can completely match Adele doing Adele, and yet Naya Rivera and Amber Riley somehow made the sum of this mashup a worthy equal to Adele's glorious original parts."

"Rumour Has It" / "Someone Like You" debuted at number eleven in the Hot 100 issue dated November 23, 2011. It sold 160,000 digital downloads in its first week, the fifth-highest first week digital sales for the series. The mash-up sparked a revival in sales for "Rumour Has It", which achieved a new peak at number sixty that same week, during which it sold 42,000 digital copies. In Canada, the mash-up entered on the Canadian Hot 100 at number twelve on the strength of sales of 14,000 downloads. With the death of Whitney Houston three days before the "Heart" episode aired, a great deal of attention was given to Riley's performance of Houston's hit during the episode, "I Will Always Love You", and its unexpected function as a tribute to the singer. Reviews were glowing: Reiter called it a "gorgeous, lush take" that was "definitely an episode highlight", and Bell described is as "a beautiful cover", "the perfect song for Mercedes to sing to Sam" and a "haunting performance". Flandez wrote that it was a "heart-rending love song that becomes a homage of the 48-year-old fallen star", and "brought goosebumps"; the shot near the end, "of Mercedes dressed in a sweetheart gown, standing alone, reaching for the stars, was memorable". Chaney said that "Riley deserves a standing ovation", and that she sang the song with "a power motivated by genuine emotions that tied in directly to her storyline"; the "heartbreaking context of Houston's death ... immediately elevated this moment to the very best one of Glee's entire third season."

== Reception ==
Ryan Brockington. for the New York Post has written that "the key to this show lies directly within the female leads", praising Riley as Mercedes and noting that in "Acafellas", Riley "finally got a chance to shine". Similarly, Stack commented that the best aspect of "Acafellas" was the focus it placed on previously more minor characters such as Mercedes. Eric Goldman of IGN criticised Mercedes' actions in the episode "Ballad", in which Puck confesses to her he is the father of Quinn's baby, and Mercedes responds by telling him to leave Quinn alone. Goldman questioned: "Really? She doesn't think Finn should know he's not really the dad? She doesn't think Puck should be involved, given he actually is the dad? It was a really strange response, and given Mercedes is not generally written to be an unlikable, manipulative person (That's Terri!), I'm not sure how the writers thought this was a justified viewpoint for her."

Korbi Ghosh of Zap2it has named Mercedes' best moment as her performance of "Imagine" in the episode "Hairography", commending her as: "instead of overpowering their performance with her spectacular talents, she toned it down, allowing the deaf choir to truly shine as she humbly sang beside them, showing her support." Ghosh deemed her low point vandalizing Kurt's car in "Acafellas", commenting: "Mercedes has clearly got some anger and aggression issues — not to mention being a bit clueless... the boy is into other boys, hello! — But we'll forgive her. We got to watch her sing "I Bust The Windows Out" because of it, so it's all good." Stack approved of the budding friendship between Mercedes and Quinn in the episode "Home", and added, "Their scene together in the nurses office was really touching and sweet. Damn, these kids can act."

The relationship between Mercedes and Shane was initially well received. Goldberg called their first scene together "adorable", and wrote that her "new love life seems to have refreshed the character on screen as her newfound happiness translates well". Hyman hoped their coupling would continue, though Matt Zoller Seitz of Salon.com lamented Sam's departure, as he felt a relationship between the two "would have been groundbreaking for all sorts of reasons".

The Mercedes storyline in "Asian F" was met with widely divergent reactions. Many reviewers were unhappy with the return of the Rachel versus Mercedes rivalry, including AOLTV's Crystal Bell, who lamented that it had "been done every season". Nearly as many expressed the hope that Mercedes was not pregnant given her nausea in the first "booty camp" scene, including Hyman, Kubicek, and West. Benigno felt Mercedes was acting "wildly out of character" in the episode. Slezak was also puzzled at her change, and asked, "When has Mercedes ever been anything other than a team player and New Directions MVP? Seriously, nobody's going to cut her slack for a bad week?" Canning agreed, and wrote: "Schue's tough love with Mercedes came out of left field", and felt it added to the "inconsistency of these characters", even though "it ultimately made sense" in the context of setup for "It's All Over". Poniewozik wrote that having the story "turn on her resentment at being overlooked by the glee club is an apt meta-touch, since she's been overlooked by the show for some time now." VanDerWerff was the most enthusiastic about her storyline, and called it "the best part of the episode": it was "all about how she now feels appreciated—because she has a boyfriend, sigh—and so she's willing to take on Rachel for the role of Maria (and, actually, beat her) and push for what she feels is rightfully hers, which involves more respect from New Directions."
