= Sue Sylvester =

Fictional character from the Fox series Glee

- Glee character
- Jane Lynch as Sue Sylvester in Glee
- First appearance: "Pilot" (2009)
- Last appearance: "Dreams Come True" (2015)
- Created by: Ryan Murphy; Brad Falchuk; Ian Brennan
- Portrayed by: Jane Lynch; Colby Minifie (young)

In-universe information
- Occupation: Cheerleading coach (formerly); TV news personality (formerly); Principal (formerly); Vice President of the United States
- Family: Doris Sylvester (mother); Jean Sylvester (sister, deceased)
- Children: Robin Sylvester (daughter)

Susan "Sue" Rodham Sylvester is a fictional character of the Fox musical comedy-drama series, Glee. The character is portrayed by actress Jane Lynch, and appears in Glee from its pilot episode, first broadcast on May 19, 2009, through the show's final episode, first broadcast on March 20, 2015.

Sue was developed by Glee creators Ryan Murphy, Brad Falchuk, and Ian Brennan. For the show's first four seasons, Sue is the track-suit wearing coach of the William McKinley High School Cheerleaders (otherwise known as "the Cheerios"), and a ruthless bully with an iron fist to both students and faculty members alike. Because her cheerleading squad competes with the glee club for the school's limited funding, she is often at odds with the club and more particularly its director Will Schuester (Matthew Morrison). Sue is the main antagonist throughout the series' run. In the show's fifth season, Sue is made the school's new principal, though she is ultimately fired late in the show's sixth and final season.

Due to Lynch's initial limited availability, Sue was originally set to be a recurring character while Lynch was working on a Damon Wayans pilot for the American Broadcasting Company (ABC). When that pilot fell through, Sue became a starring role. Both the character and Lynch’s performance have been acclaimed by critics. Mary McNamara for the Los Angeles Times has written that "Lynch alone makes Glee worth watching", while Entertainment Weekly's Ken Tucker has called Sue "the greatest Broadway-musical villain to ever co-star in a TV series". In recognition of her portrayal of Sue, Lynch won an Emmy and a Golden Globe Award.

== Storylines ==
=== Season 1 ===
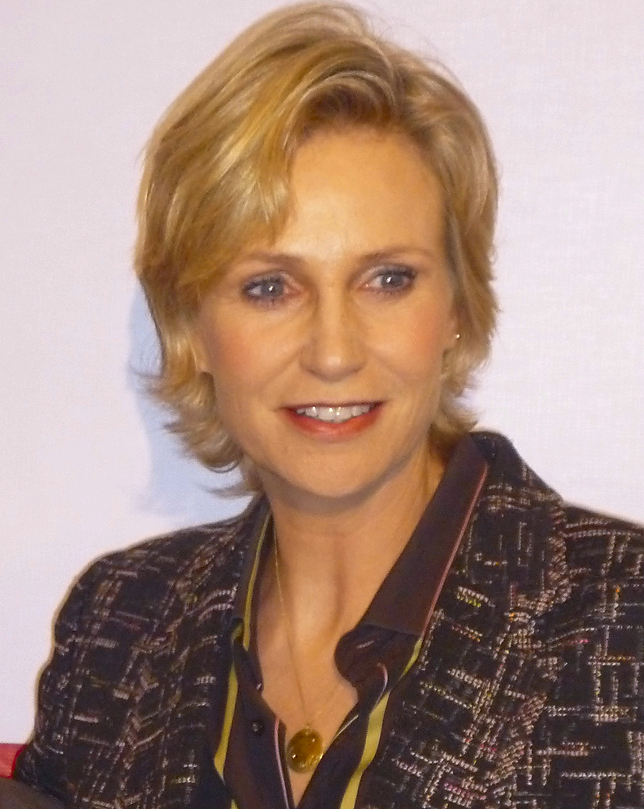
Jane Lynch (pictured) plays Sue

Throughout the first season of Glee, Sue makes numerous attempts at sabotaging the William McKinley High School glee club, New Directions. She enlists members of her cheerleading squad, the Cheerios, to bring the club down from the inside, and conspires to lure away its star member, Rachel Berry (Lea Michele). Sue is appointed co-director of the club by Principal Figgins (Iqbal Theba), but soon scales back her involvement when her attempts to turn the club members against director Will Schuester (Matthew Morrison) fail. Hoping to ruin the club's chances of winning at the show choir Sectionals competition, Sue gives New Directions' setlist to the directors of their rival glee clubs. Despite having to devise a new setlist at the last moment, New Directions win by unanimous decision and Sue is suspended by Figgins. She blackmails him into allowing her back, and is selected as a judge for the show choir Regionals competition. Sue is ridiculed by the other judges for her lack of fame and underdog status, allowing her to empathize with the glee club members. She votes for New Directions to win, and although they place last, she blackmails Figgins into allowing them another year to compete.

Sue's personal life is also explored over the course of the season. She has a commentary feature on the local television news, "Sue's Corner", which she uses to editorialize on issues such as littering and support for caning. She falls in love with news anchor Rod Remington (Bill A. Jones), but their burgeoning relationship comes to an abrupt end when she discovers he is sleeping with his co-anchor, Andrea Carmichael (Earlene Davis). In the episode "Wheels", Sue allows Becky Jackson (Lauren Potter), a freshman with Down syndrome, to join the Cheerios. Will is suspicious of her motives, increasingly so when Sue donates money to the school to fund three new ramps for students with disabilities. It is revealed that Sue's older sister Jean (Robin Trocki) also has Down syndrome, and lives in a residential care facility. Sue becomes a minor celebrity when Olivia Newton-John invites her to remake the video to "Physical", after a viral video of Sue Jazzercising to the track achieves internet notoriety. She donates her share of the profits to her sister's care home.

=== Season 2 ===
At the onset of the second season, Sue has formed a truce with Will, and together they conspire against the school's new football coach, Shannon Beiste (Dot-Marie Jones). When Will comes to regret his actions and apologizes, Sue renews their enmity. She is appointed acting principal after having Figgins infected with the flu, but although the school board is so impressed with her performance they make her position permanent, she resigns when they refuse to uphold her expulsion of Dave Karofsky (Max Adler), a bully who had threatened to kill glee club member Kurt Hummel (Chris Colfer). After Sue learns that Rod and Andrea have become engaged, she announces her intention to marry herself. Her estranged mother Doris (Carol Burnett), a recently retired Nazi hunter, visits in an attempt to make amends for her absentee parenting, but is continuously critical of her daughter, to the point that Sue disinvites her during her wedding ceremony. Doris leaves, and Sue and Jean comfort each other.

Sue grows disillusioned with cheerleading, and in an effort to recapture her love for it, plans to fire cheerleader Brittany Pierce (Heather Morris) from a cannon during the team's next competitive routine. Brittany and her friends Santana Lopez (Naya Rivera) and Quinn Fabray (Dianna Agron) ultimately quit the squad, which loses at Regionals after having won the national title for six straight years. Sue is named Loser of the Year in a televised interview with Katie Couric, and has her budget slashed. Depressed, Sue stages a fake suicide, and as she hoped would happen, is convinced to temporarily join the glee club to lift her spirits, though she really wants to bring down the club from within. When her attempts to do so fail, Sue decides to become the coach of Aural Intensity, one of New Directions' Regionals competitors, and deliberately injures their director in order to get the job. Sue is furious when her club loses to New Directions, and punches the announcer in the face.

More intent than ever on destroying the glee club, Sue forms a "League of Doom", which consists of former glee club director Sandy Ryerson (Stephen Tobolowsky), the coach of rival glee club Vocal Adrenaline, Dustin Goolsby (Cheyenne Jackson), and Will's ex-wife Terri Schuester (Jessalyn Gilsig). Their first mission, to ruin a New Directions benefit, fails when Sandy is won over by a performance from Mercedes Jones (Amber Riley) and donates the full amount needed. Devastated by Jean's death from pneumonia, Sue turns to Terri, who has the glee club's plane tickets for Nationals changed from New York to Tripoli. She also removes Becky from the Cheerios, because she reminds her of her sister. Kurt and his stepbrother Finn Hudson (Cory Monteith) help Sue to clean out Jean's things, and she accepts their offer to have New Directions perform at the funeral, as she is afraid no one else will come. At the well-attended funeral service, an emotional Sue is unable to continue reading her eulogy after a few sentences, and Will reads the remainder for her. Touched by his support, Sue tells Will he is a good friend and she will no longer go after the glee club. She will instead be running for the United States House of Representatives on a platform of lowering health care costs, as her sister had faced significantly higher bills in her last few years. She then apologizes to Becky, reinstates her as a member of the Cheerios, and tells her she will be captain of the squad next year. As a final act of reconciliation, Sue asks for and receives a hug from Becky.

=== Season 3 ===
At the start of the third season, Sue's campaign for Congress is not going well. She decides to pledge to get rid of all arts programs in schools, music and theater especially, until all students are reading at or above grade level. Will's attempt to embarrass Sue and highlight the value of the arts by glitter bombing her backfires, and Sue's poll numbers rise. She also goes back on her promise to leave the glee club alone by having her new cheerleading co-captains, Becky and Santana, sabotage the club's recruitment drive. She rails against the school musical, and succeeds in having its funding rescinded. This angers Kurt's father, Burt Hummel (Mike O'Malley), who arranges for local businesses to sponsor the musical, and he enters the congressional race as a write-in candidate to defeat her. Sue runs a negative campaign, airing political ads containing false statements about Burt's personal life through her political ads. One of the other candidates in the race discovers that Santana is a lesbian, and uses this to attack Sue on the issue of "family values" for appointing her a cheerleading captain, and to imply that Sue herself is a lesbian. Santana is devastated, as she has not yet come out as a lesbian. Sue attempts to combat the implications by starting a relationship with one of her former bed partners, Ohio State football recruiter Cooter Menkins, who had recently been dating Coach Beiste. Being seen in public with Cooter does not help her in the voting, however; she comes in third, and Burt wins.

In the episode "On My Way", Sue reveals she is pregnant, shocking everyone. Her child is revealed by doctors to be a girl, but they mention that there were abnormalities on the scan. Sue mentions to Becky that she will have a child just like her, hinting that the baby may have Down's Syndrome. She shows unusual compassion, telling Will she will help him win nationals, letting Quinn rejoin the Cheerios, and is visibly upset at Karofsky's suicide attempt.

=== Season 4 ===
In the first episode of the fourth season, "The New Rachel", Sue, now a mother, introduces her newborn child named Robin to Kurt. Sue then calls Kitty Wilde (Becca Tobin), a new cheerleader into her office to take care of Robin. She heavily forbids new transgender student Wade "Unique" Adams (Alex Newell) to audition for the role of Rizzo on the school's musical, Grease, only to create an argument between her and Finn, who insists on casting Unique. This ends badly when Finn inadvertently insults Robin during the argument, starting a strong rivalry between the two. Sue "proposes" to Finn that if New Directions lose sectionals, the glee club would end. They lose and Sue uses the choir room for the Cheerios practices when the weather is cold. When New Directions discover that they won because the other club cheated, Sue gives them back the choir room. During Christmas, Sue gets Millie Rose (Trisha Rae Stahl), the lunch lady and glee club member Marley Rose's (Melissa Benoist) mother as her secret santa. She overheard the conversation between them in which Marley wants to have a Christmas tree and at least some gifts, but Millie says they need to save money to pay a counselor to treat Marley for her eating disorder. Sue breaks into the Roses' home that night and leaves them a Christmas tree, several presents, and enough money to pay Marley's counselor.

Sue is fired from the William McKinley High School in "Shooting Star", when Becky's gun is shot by accident, causing everyone to think that there's a school shooting. Sue says it was her gun and she misfired it while checking it, to protect Becky. Coach Roz replaces Sue as the cheerleader squad coach and takes her office. Sue later starts working as a personal trainer, and Blaine tries to get her back on McKinley's faculty, but she denies his offer by saying that getting fired was the best thing that could have ever happened to her, because now, as a trainer, people respect her, and also admits that she does not miss the Cheerios at all.

=== Season 5 ===
In the episode "Love Love Love," Sue has come back to McKinley High after Becky confessed to the shooting. Upon her return, Sue gets Principal Figgins fired by faking incriminating details about him. He is demoted to janitor, while she takes his job as principal, where she constantly torments Figgins, and tells Will and Roz that she will keep the Cheerios and New Directions going if they win in their upcoming competitions.

Following Finn's death in the episode "The Quarterback," Sue orders the memorial in the school to be taken down, which angers Santana to the point where she confronts her and pushes her into a filing cabinet. She later reveals, after Santana apologizes to her, she is heartbroken Finn died believing she hated him, while she actually respected him and looked forward to having him as a colleague. In "Puppet Master" Sue experiences a hallucination in the choir room, later to be a gas leak. After fixing the pipe herself, she then becomes the school's permanent principal. In "City Of Angels", after New Directions comes in second in their Nationals competition, Sue disbands the club, although she gets Will a job interview at Carmel High School as the new Coach for Vocal Adrenaline. She later comes to New York City as Will's companion since neither his wife Emma Pillsbury (Jayma Mays) nor Beiste could go to see Rachel's broadway opening night in Funny Girl. Her ulterior motive was because of the public backlash she received after saying she hates New York City and Broadway on "Sue's Corner" while having never been there. She meets Mario (Chris Parnell), a New York citizen, and both are instantly lovestruck. They share their disdain of the show and walk out in the middle of the show, have a date in his restaurant, and sleep together in Rachel and Kurt's apartment. The next morning, Rachel berates the two, particularly Sue, and she leaves. After parting ways with Mario, she goes back to Lima and states that she loves New York on "Sue's Corner".

=== Season 6 ===
The final season begin with McKinley under Sue as its principal: test scores are up, body mass indexes are down. She also forcibly transferred Unique, Marley, Ryder Lynn (Blake Jenner), and Jake Puckerman (Jacob Artist) to other schools (she kept Kitty in McKinley for the Cheerios) to completely get rid of glee club's history. When Rachel gets a permission to reboot the glee club by the school board and leads it alongside Kurt, Sue is angry. In "Jagged Little Tapestry", Sue gives Beiste her support for the latter's transition process, and alongside Tina Cohen-Chang (Jenna Ushkowitz), Quinn, and Coach Roz, are equally apprehensive about Becky's new boyfriend Darrell (Justin Prentice). During the course of the season, Sue tricks Sam Evans (Chord Overstreet) by setting Rachel up to sabotage her; it is also revealed that she secretly wants Kurt and Blaine's relationship to succeed, and was devastated when they called off their engagement. She tries various tactics to get them back together, including trapping them in an elevator and forcing them to kiss if they want to be released. In "A Wedding", Sue tries to attend Brittany and Santana's wedding only to be flatly refused for her treatment of everyone. Showing a softer side, Sue visits Santana's grandmother who doesn't believe in two women marrying and uses "some reverse Suecology" to get the woman to see that no matter what she believes, family is most important. Sue is then allowed to attend the wedding and helps convince Kurt and Blaine to marry alongside Brittany and Santana, providing the rings for them when they don't have any. Sue later provides the two couples with their dream honeymoons, telling them that despite how she's treated them over the years, she's come to see them like her own kids.

She is fired as principal in "The Rise and Fall of Sue Sylvester" after Becky, who finally sees the error in Sue's ways, decides to expose her. Heartbroken over Becky's betrayal, she is further hurt by her mother, Doris', claim that Sue is "the daughter she couldn't love", although both of them eventually reconnect after admitting each other's misdeeds. Initially berating Will, she retaliates by joining as Vocal Adrenaline's coach, only to reveal that she deliberately created a spectacle that would alienate the judges to thank Will for standing up for her when she got exposed. She reunites with Becky in the series finale.

By the series finale, in 2020, Sue is the Republican Vice President of the United States to President Jeb Bush, with Becky as the head of her secret service team. She is planning on running for president in 2024. She rededicates the McKinley High auditorium to be named in honor of Finn Hudson while apologizing for her previous poor perception of the glee club. McKinley High has now become a model of excellence and other schools are copying its format. New Directions members from years past and present unite for one last massive group song, with Sue and Becky joining the entire cast for one final bow.

== Development ==
=== Casting and creation ===
Sue is played by Jane Lynch. The character did not exist when the script for the Glee pilot was first submitted to Fox. In an interview with Entertainment Weekly, Ryan Murphy said that Fox Entertainment president Kevin Reilly was responsible for her creation. "On our first call, Kevin said, 'You need a villain,'" Murphy remembered. "And I said, 'You know, you're right.' I knew exactly who she is. I said, 'Her name is Sue Sylvester. And she is the cheerleading coach. And she may be on horse estrogen.'" The casting notice described Sue as "the anal, tightly wound, and ruthlessly ambitious leader of the Harrison High cheer leading squad." At the time she was cast as Sue, Lynch was already committed to do a Damon Wayans pilot for ABC. The Glee role initially had her as a guest star, in the hope that she could become a regular in the future. When the ABC pilot fell through, Lynch became a series regular.

=== Characterization ===
Sue is initially presented as the glee club's "arch-nemesis". Following the pilot episode, Lynch said she is "pure evil and doesn't hide it", explaining that she was created as a product of Murphy, Brennan and Falchuk's "inner mean girl". Lynch feels that Sue has the ability to be both "horrible and really delightful at the same time", assessing that she continually speaks her mind as she enjoys appalling people with the things she says. She encapsulates Sue's world view as being about "power and winning", stating that she will do anything to win. Sue's softer side manifests following the revelation that her sister has Down syndrome. She is depicted as kind and loving towards Jean, though Lynch stated that exploration of Sue's humanity would be limited. Sue is an atheist, but according to Murphy, does not want to be. He explained, "She [is] saying to the world, 'Prove [me] wrong: If God is kindness and love, make me believe in God.'" The second-season episode "Grilled Cheesus" focuses on the characters' differing approaches to religion. Sue lobbies against the performance of spiritual songs in school, engaging in a philosophical argument on the matter with school guidance counselor Emma Pillsbury (Jayma Mays), which Murphy describes as the scene he is "most proud to have been involved with in [his] entire career." On the fifth-season episode "Puppet Master", the reason behind Sue's track suit outfit was revealed. It was because she felt that she never received the respect she deserved as a teacher and even the then Principal Figgins "insulted" her and said that she was a cheerleading coach so she needed to "try some pants" because she was wearing an office skirt and that she had long hair. She said that the moment she put the track suit on, "the world bowed before her" and that she "had one made in every color".

== Musical performances ==
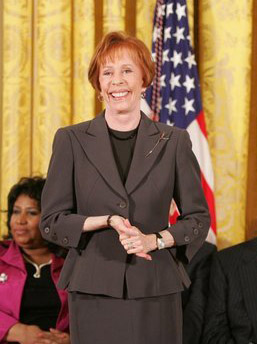
Sue duets with her mother Doris (Carol Burnett, pictured) during season two.

Sue performs in several of the series' musical numbers. In the first-season episode "Mash-Up", she is given a dancing lesson by Will, to Louis Prima's "Sing, Sing, Sing (With a Swing)". Her first vocal performance comes in the episode "The Power of Madonna", in which Sue enacts a frame-by-frame recreation of the music video for Madonna's "Vogue". The track features on the extended play record Glee: The Music, The Power of Madonna, released to accompany the episode, and charted at number 106 on the UK singles chart. Sue duets with Olivia Newton-John on her song "Physical" in the episode "Bad Reputation". This track was included on the soundtrack album Glee: The Music, Volume 3 Showstoppers, as well as the compilation albums Glee: The Music, The Complete Season One, and Glee: The Music, The Complete Season One Collection. Also released as a single available for download, it charted both on the Billboard Hot 100 and internationally, peaking at number 89 in the US, 88 in Australia, 61 in Canada and 56 in the United Kingdom. During the second season, Sue duets with her mother Doris on "Ohio" from the 1953 musical Wonderful Town. The song was suggested to Murphy by Burnett, who felt that the lyrics were suited to her character's storyline.

In the fourth season, Sue performs "Little Girls" from Annie in the episode "Lights Out" and a mash-up of Nicki Minaj's "Super Bass" and "I Still Believe by Mariah Carey as a duet with Darren Criss in the episode "Feud". Sue featured in three duets during the fifth season: "Cheek to Cheek" by Fred Astaire and "NYC" from Annie with Matthew Morrison in the episodes "Puppet Master" and "Opening Night" respectively and "Who Are You Now?" from Funny Girl with Lea Michele also in "Opening Night". Sue's final solo in the series is a cover of "Bitch" by Meredith Brooks in "The Hurt Locker, Part One". She performs another duet with Doris in "The Rise and Fall of Sue Sylvester": "The Trolley Song" from "Meet Me in St. Louis. Also featured in that episode is a duet of Europe's "The Final Countdown with Will. Sue's final performance is a duet with Will of ABBA's "The Winner Takes It All."

== Reception ==
=== Critical response ===
The character of Sue has received widespread praise, lauded as "the greatest Broadway-musical villain to ever co-star in a TV series" by Entertainment Weekly's Ken Tucker. In an early review, Robert Lloyd of the Los Angeles Times criticized her domination of scenes and flat characterization, commenting: "She's funny from line to line, but there is little to her besides tin-pot contrariness." In June 2010, Entertainment Weekly named her one of the 100 Greatest Characters of the Last 20 Years. She is the 100th Most Memorable Female TV Character, according to AOL TV. She was included in AfterEllen.com's Top 50 Favorite Female TV Characters.

Lynch's performance in the role has attracted critical acclaim. Following the pilot episode, Mary McNamara of the Los Angeles Times wrote that she alone makes the series worth watching. IGN's Eric Goldman later assessed that a comic actress such as Lynch is necessary to make the character loveable, given that her key traits include smugness, ignorance and casual racism. The Los Angeles Times Shawna Malcom similarly praised Lynch's portrayal for keeping Sue from being "an over-the-top disaster." Raymund Flandez of The Wall Street Journal suggested that the show would be less fun without Lynch's delivery.

Variety's Brian Lowry was critical of Lynch in early episodes, deeming Glee's adult cast "over-the-top buffoons", and writing that she "chews through her material so relentlessly as to be fitfully funny but usually just plain annoying." The New York Times' Mike Hale wrote that she gives a "one-note performance" in Glee, suggesting that she is miscast in the role, as "her talent for playing repressed nut cases doesn’t extend to playing straightforward Nazis."

=== Accolades ===
Lynch has won a number of awards for her portrayal of Sue. At the 14th Satellite Awards, she won the Satellite Award for Best Supporting Actress – Series, Miniseries, or Television Film. The following year, she won Primetime Emmy Award for Outstanding Supporting Actress in a Comedy Series at the 62nd Primetime Emmy Awards, for her performance in the episode "The Power of Madonna". She received the TCA Award for Individual Achievement in Comedy at the 26th TCA Awards, as well as the Actress Comedy Series accolade at the WIN Awards. Lynch was part of the Glee cast ensemble given the Screen Actors Guild Award for Outstanding Performance by an Ensemble in a Comedy Series at the 16th Screen Actors Guild Awards. She was named Favorite Female TV Star (Comedy) at the Lesbian/Bi People's Choice Awards, run by the lesbian media website AfterEllen.com, and won the TV Performance of the Year: Musical or Comedy Award at the inaugural Dorian Awards, reflecting gay interest in the TV industry. The following year, Lynch tied in the same category with co-star Chris Colfer. 2011 also saw Lynch named Golden Globe Award for Best Supporting Actress – Series, Miniseries, or Television Film at the 68th Golden Globe Awards, and Favorite TV Comedy Actress Award at the 37th People's Choice Awards.

The role has earned Lynch nominations for several further awards. She was nominated for Best Supporting Actress in a Series, Miniseries, or Television Film at the 67th Golden Globe Awards, and for Best Supporting Actress in a Series, Miniseries, or Television Film at the 15th Satellite Awards. Also in 2010, Sue was nominated Choice TV: Villain at the Teen Choice Awards, and Lynch was nominated for the Favorite TV Actress Award at the AfterEllen.com Visibility Awards. In 2011, she was nominated for the Screen Actors Guild Award for Outstanding Performance by a Female Actor in a Comedy Series at the 17th Screen Actors Guild Awards, and was also part of an ensemble nomination for Outstanding Performance by an Ensemble in a Comedy Series.

=== Impact ===
Lynch was selected as the 2010 principal honoree of Madame Tussauds wax museum in Hollywood. A wax figure of Lynch as Sue was created, featuring the character's trademark tracksuit and bullhorn. At the August unveiling of the figure, Brennan commented that Sue would approve of being immortalized in such a manner. In 2020, an image depicting Sue proclaiming that she is going to "create an environment that is so toxic" from episode seven became a prominent reaction image and Internet meme.
