= Glee season 5 =

2013–14 season of American musical comedy drama

Glee
- Season 5
- Promotional poster and home media cover art
- Starring: Jacob Artist; Melissa Benoist; Chris Colfer; Darren Criss; Blake Jenner; Jane Lynch; Kevin McHale; Lea Michele; Matthew Morrison; Alex Newell; Chord Overstreet; Naya Rivera; Becca Tobin; Jenna Ushkowitz
- No. of episodes: 20

Release
- Original network: Fox
- Original release: September 26, 2013 – May 13, 2014

Season chronology
- ← Previous; Season 4 Next → Season 6

The fifth season of the Fox musical comedy-drama television series Glee was commissioned on April 19, 2013, along with a sixth season. It premiered on September 26, 2013, as part of the 2013 fall season. After a winter break, it returned on February 25, 2014, moving to Tuesday nights to finish its season. The second part of the season featured the 100th episode of the series, the 12th episode of the season, which aired on March 18, 2014. It was shorter than previous seasons, with twenty episodes instead of twenty-two.

The series features the New Directions glee club at the fictional William McKinley High School (WMHS) in the town of Lima, Ohio, and graduates of McKinley who have moved to New York City, some to attend the fictional New York Academy of Dramatic Arts (NYADA). Unlike previous seasons, the fifth continues the school year begun in season four. The first half of the season follows the club competing on the show choir circuit, while the remainder of the season focuses on graduation and the alumni's lives in New York City as its members, faculty and alumni deal with gay bashing, death, intimacy, STDs, transphobia and other social issues. The central characters are glee club director Will Schuester (Matthew Morrison), cheerleading coach and school principal Sue Sylvester (Jane Lynch), glee club members Artie Abrams (Kevin McHale), Blaine Anderson (Darren Criss), Tina Cohen-Chang (Jenna Ushkowitz), Sam Evans (Chord Overstreet) and graduates Rachel Berry (Lea Michele), Kurt Hummel (Chris Colfer), and Santana Lopez (Naya Rivera). Previously recurring characters Jake Puckerman (Jacob Artist), Marley Rose (Melissa Benoist), Ryder Lynn (Blake Jenner), Wade "Unique" Adams (Alex Newell), and Kitty Wilde (Becca Tobin), who are current glee club members at WMHS, have been promoted to the main cast in the fifth season—though none of them appear in the last trimester, seven episodes, of the season, as the season moves its focus to the alumni. Heather Morris, Amber Riley, Mark Salling, and Harry Shum, Jr., who have portrayed Brittany Pierce, Mercedes Jones, Noah "Puck" Puckerman and Mike Chang (respectively) since season one, are no longer series regulars, but did appear as guest stars.

This is the first season not to feature Cory Monteith, who died shortly before production was scheduled to begin. The death of Monteith's character, Finn Hudson, was the subject of the third episode, "The Quarterback", which paid tribute to them both. The series went on hiatus after the third episode, and resumed airing episodes after the baseball postseason. After the death of Monteith, the shows ratings went down severely, falling below 4.6 million viewers for the first time, with the final 12 episodes watched by fewer than 3 million viewers per week, falling to fewer than 1.9 million for the final episode. This was attributed to a sharp decline in quality as the writers had to replace much of the season's planned storylines.

The series abandoned the current glee club members at WMHS for the final seven episodes of the season (with Tobin being the only one with significant plotlines for the following season), with plots focusing only on the cast members from the first three seasons of the series.

The season was nominated for one Emmy Award for Outstanding Directing for a Comedy Series.

== Episodes ==
No. overall	No. in season	Title	Directed by	Written by	Original release date	Prod. code	US viewers (millions)
89	1	"Love, Love, Love"	Bradley Buecker	Brad Falchuk	September 26, 2013	5ARC01	5.06
Will gives New Directions a two-week assignment covering the Beatles, with the first week focusing on their early years. Rachel's dreams of Broadway seem to be in jeopardy when a "chemistry" audition ends abruptly, and Santana gets her a job at the Broadway diner where she works. Artie and Kitty begin dating, although she asks Artie to keep their relationship a secret. When Tina discovers that Artie and Kitty are dating, she attempts to convince Artie to go public with the relationship, which he refuses. After Becky's confession to Principal Figgins, Sue is free to return to McKinley. Sue frames Figgins by planting pornography and other unsuitable material in his office, where it is discovered by authorities. She then replaces Figgins as interim principal, making him the janitor, and informs Will and Roz that they must win their respective Nationals competitions or be fired. Blaine serenades Kurt at Dalton Academy with a performance of "All You Need Is Love" and proposes marriage, which Kurt accepts.
90	2	"Tina in the Sky with Diamonds"	Ian Brennan	Ian Brennan	October 3, 2013	5ARC02	4.42
The second of two tribute episodes to the Beatles features the McKinley prom. When Tina is named one of the nominees for prom queen, she capitalizes on the potential votes of girls without dates for her campaign. Although she ends up winning, Tina's triumph is sabotaged by new cheerleader Bree, who drops a bucket of red slushie on Tina while she is on-stage. Roz informs Sue that Bree is behind the prank and demands that she is punished, but Sue instead promotes Bree to captain of the Cheerios, encouraging her to further torment the New Directions to toughen them up for Nationals. Rachel and Santana make a new friend at the diner where they work: a struggling artist named Dani. Dani is attracted to Santana, and the two share a kiss. Sam is attracted to the new school nurse, a college sophomore named Penny Owen. Mr. Campion, the Funny Girl director, informs Rachel that she has been cast as Fanny Brice.
91	3	"The Quarterback"	Brad Falchuk	Ryan Murphy & Brad Falchuk & Ian Brennan	October 10, 2013	5ARC03	7.39
Past and present members of New Directions reunite at McKinley after Finn Hudson's death, and Will invites them to honor Finn through song. While helping his parents sort Finn's belongings, Kurt keeps Finn's letterman jacket. Santana is enraged when Sue orders the Cheerios to take apart Finn's memorial, and shoves her in anger. After Santana breaks down during her performance, Kurt gives her Finn's jacket, which is later stolen. Puck confesses to Coach Beiste that he feels lost without Finn's guidance, and later reveals that he is joining the Air Force to honor Finn's memory. Santana apologizes to Sue, who reveals she is heartbroken that Finn died believing she hated him. Rachel tells Will that she is uncertain of the future without Finn, who she has always seen as her one and only soulmate. Later at home, Will is revealed to be the one who took Finn's jacket; Emma finds Will weeping and comforts him as he grieves.
92	4	"A Katy or a Gaga"	Ian Brennan	Russel Friend & Garrett Lerner	November 7, 2013	5ARC04	4.01
Kurt recruits Santana, Dani, and a reluctant Rachel to join his band, which she names "Pamela Lansbury". He holds auditions at NYADA, but the only applicant is Elliott, an overly bold performer who calls himself "Starchild". Kurt fears Starchild is too edgy, but ultimately reconsiders and invites Starchild to join the band. Will divides the glee club between those who identify with either Katy Perry or Lady Gaga, and instructs each group to perform a song from the other group to strengthen their weak points. Marley refuses to change for the assignment and joins the club's performance of "Applause" dressed as Katy Perry; Will suspends Marley for breaking the rules of the assignment. Jake is frustrated in his relationship with Marley, and he seduces Bree when Marley refuses to have sex with him. After being informed of Will's assignment, Sue suspends the glee club for a week for dressing inappropriately on school grounds.
93	5	"The End of Twerk"	Wendey Stanzler	Michael Hitchcock	November 14, 2013	5ARC05	4.22
Rachel decides that both she and Kurt should be tattooed; Kurt's tattoo ends up getting botched, and Rachel, who claims she decided not to get one, is revealed to have actually gotten a tattoo saying "Finn". Marley and Jake break up when he confirms that he had sex with Bree. Sue is appalled when Will decides to have the New Directions twerk in Nationals to "edge up" their performance, and fires him. Will appeals to the school board, showing how several dances were, in their time, considered as controversial as twerking, and is reinstated. Unique is caught using the girls' bathroom by Bree, and is forced to use the boys' bathroom from then on. Sue offers to give Unique her own key to the faculty bathroom if Will ends the twerking assignment and cancels his plans to have them do it at Nationals; Will grudgingly accepts the proposal.
94	6	"Movin' Out"	Brad Falchuk	Roberto Aguirre-Sacasa	November 21, 2013	5ARC06	4.09
Sue organizes a career fair at McKinley but refuses to include any arts-related booths, believing pursuing a career in the entertainment industry will likely result in failure. Will admits that show business is a difficult professional area, and assigns New Directions to perform Billy Joel songs, due to his notorious struggle to reach stardom. Blaine and Sam visit New York to scout potential colleges; Kurt helps Blaine train for his NYADA audition, while Sam submits to a prestigious modelling agent who insists he lose ten pounds. Artie helps Becky figure out if college is right for her. Jake begins to embrace his lifestyle as a womanizer, while Ryder is excited over the prospect of having a relationship with Marley; she rebuffs him, claiming to still be recovering from her break-up with Jake. Sam and Blaine return to Lima after Blaine successfully auditions for NYADA, and Blaine tells Sue she is wrong about pursuing a career in the arts.
95	7	"Puppet Master"	Paul McCrane	Matthew Hodgson	November 28, 2013	5ARC07	2.84
Kurt books the first formal performance for Pamela Lansbury, but the band disagrees over his choice of venue. Will instructs the New Directions to brainstorm ideas for Nationals. When the club reacts badly to Blaine's suggestions, Blaine refuses to perform and sits in the back of the choir room. A gas leak in the rehearsal room causes Blaine, Jake and Sue to hallucinate. Blaine later apologizes to the glee club for his behavior. After the superintendent mistakes her for a man, Sue confesses to Becky that she changed her feminine appearance when she started working at McKinley to gain respect from the students. Sue is promoted to full-time principal by the school board. Bree warns Jake that his narcissism and promiscuous ways will have unwanted consequences, and cuts ties with him due to his bad influence. Moved by her words, Jake tries to make amends with Marley, who confesses that she now only views him as a friend.
96	8	"Previously Unaired Christmas"	Wendey Stanzler	Ross Maxwell	December 5, 2013	5ARC08	3.29
The episode opens with a monologue by Jane Lynch, who explains that the following Christmas special was supposedly banned by the Fox network in 2012 for being too offensive. Will selects Sam and Tina to create New Directions' entry for McKinley's annual tree decorating contest. They end up winning the contest, but notice that Becky is depressed about losing; they offer her a role in the nativity scene as baby Jesus to cheer her up. While working as mall elves, Rachel, Kurt and Santana visit the loft of Cody, the mall Santa who is later revealed to be a con artist. The glee club comes up with a scheme to convince Kitty to play Virgin Mary, as she feels she does not feel worthy of playing the role. The next day, Unique performs a highly offensive rendition of "Love Child" as Virgin Mary; Kitty is appalled and volunteers for the role, only to find out the performance was meant to push her into accepting it.
97	9	"Frenemies"	Bradley Buecker	Ned Martel	February 25, 2014	5ARC09	2.99
Artie and Tina are forced to square off against each other for the honor of being the valedictorian of the graduating class, as they both have equal qualifications. Sue ends up choosing Blaine as valedictorian, making Artie and Tina co-salutatorians. In New York, Kurt suspects that Elliott is trying to steal the band from him, and decides to get closer by pretending to want guitar lessons. They realize they enjoy spending time with each other, and Elliott reassures Kurt he is not trying to upstage him. Santana auditions for the role of Rachel's understudy in Funny Girl, copying Rachel's signature moves through a performance of "Don't Rain on My Parade". Santana successfully gets the job, and Mr. Campion announces that the show is using the fact that she and Rachel came from the same school in Ohio as publicity. Incensed, Rachel decides to move out of the loft and cut ties with Santana, ending their friendship.
98	10	"Trio"	Ian Brennan	Sophia Rivka Rossi	March 4, 2014	5ARC10	2.68
Rachel is revealed to have moved in with Elliott, who feels caught in the middle of her fight with Santana. Tired of the girls' feuding, Kurt reconvenes Elliott and Dani to form a new musical venture, One Three Hill. Santana and Rachel watch the trio perform, during which Santana points out that they share a hunger for success and a willingness to backstab others. Tina, Sam and Blaine sneak onto school property overnight to spend time together before their impending graduation, but Becky unexpectedly attaches herself to their group. Tina and Sam later sneak off to make out, acting on their unresolved sexual tension. Will and Emma become distracted from their teaching jobs when they decide to have a child, including having sex on school grounds during work hours. As Will packs for Nationals, Emma reveals that she won't be going, as she is pregnant.
99	11	"City of Angels"	Elodie Keene	Jessica Meyer	March 11, 2014	5ARC11	2.30
The New Directions go to Los Angeles to compete at Nationals, with Carole and Burt agreeing to chaperone in place of Emma. The club also reunites with Mercedes, who now lives in Los Angeles and has been given a record deal. Marley reveals her plans to quit the glee club after Nationals; Ryder confronts Marley for giving up on her dream of becoming a singer-songwriter. Jake and Ryder reconcile and give copies of Marley's songs to Mercedes, who tells Marley that the songs are good and encourages her to pursue her musical dreams. Sam reveals that he brought Finn's plaque from the choir room to fulfill Finn's promise to be there with them at Nationals. The New Directions' setlist is revealed to consist of Finn's favorite songs; Carole thanks the club, knowing that Finn will live on in them. The New Directions come in second to Throat Explosion, and Sue informs Will that her duties as principal requires her to disband the glee club due to budgetary constraints.
100	12	"100"	Paris Barclay	Ryan Murphy & Brad Falchuk & Ian Brennan	March 18, 2014	5ARC12	2.80
Former members and friends of New Directions return to Lima to bid Will and the club farewell. Will gives the club a final assignment: to reinvent their favorite past performances. Rachel and Mercedes feud over who is more successful, and decide to settle their dispute through a "diva-off". Puck wishes to rekindle his relationship with Quinn, only to discover that she is dating Biff, an arrogant billionaire. After Puck encourages her not to be ashamed of her past, Quinn informs Biff that she has a daughter with Puck. Biff is infuriated and breaks up with her, after which Puck and Quinn redevelop a relationship. Brittany declares her love for Santana, but Santana is reluctant to date her again due to their painful break-up. Will reunites the original New Directions members and thanks them for being a part of his life; April and Holly, who are watching from the sidelines, realize how important glee club is to Will and decide to team up to save it.
101	13	"New Directions"	Brad Falchuk	Brad Falchuk	March 25, 2014	5ARC13	2.68
Kurt and Mercedes try to help mend the feud between Santana and Rachel, but are unsuccessful. Brittany offers Santana two one-way tickets to Lesbos so they can spend time together. Santana is hesitant to give up her understudy role and allow Rachel to win their feud, but Brittany reminds Santana that Broadway has never been her dream. Santana later tells Rachel that she has resigned as her understudy, and the two reconcile. April and Holly have the glee club make a video for Will and his unborn child about how much he has meant to them, and Rachel leads the club into a performance of "Don't Stop Believin'". Santana agrees to go to Lesbos with Brittany, but convinces Brittany to return together in New York after their trip is over. The McKinley High senior class graduates. Sue admits that Will's work has helped change many kids' lives, and reveals that she got him an interview at Carmel High for the position of glee club director for Vocal Adrenaline.
102	14	"New New York"	Sanaa Hamri	Ryan Murphy	April 1, 2014	5ARC14	2.59
A few months after the end of New Directions, life in New York City poses challenges for the McKinley graduates, both newly transplanted and already established. Artie has trouble getting to places in his wheelchair, and his laptop is stolen by a subway passenger. Rachel is a leading lady on Broadway, and she is offered a town car and her own driver as a gift. Rachel agrees to take the subway with Artie after he accuses her of being pampered. Mercedes comes to New York looking to record a new album. Kurt is now rooming with Blaine, but is annoyed by an unemployed Sam, who is couch-surfing in their loft. After landing his first modelling job, Sam decides to move out, but is alarmed when he discovers that his new roommate is a pill popper. Elliott encourages Kurt to set boundaries with Blaine, who later accuses Elliott of trying to "steal" Kurt away from him. Realizing he and Kurt both need their own space, an apologetic Blaine moves in with Sam at Mercedes' new apartment.
103	15	"Bash"	Bradley Buecker	Ian Brennan	April 8, 2014	5ARC15	2.78
Rachel tries to commit to her role as Fanny Brice, realizing that her NYADA obligations are holding her back. When Madam Tibideaux is unwilling to accommodate to Rachel's commitment to Funny Girl, Rachel announces that she is quitting the school, much to Kurt's dismay. Mercedes and Sam rekindle their relationship, but Sam fails to impress Mercedes' backup singers, who believe that her dating Sam will alienate black women who would want to buy her album. After attending a candlelight vigil for a close friend targeted by violence, Kurt is himself the victim of a homophobic attack when he tries to help a kid getting beaten by two men in an alley; the two men strike Kurt in the head and punch him in the face before driving off. Kurt wakes up in the hospital and reconciles with Rachel. Burt arrives to visit Kurt, during which Kurt proclaims that the incident has confirmed to him that he is Burt's son. Kurt performs "I'm Still Here" for his Mid-Winter Critique performance and receives a standing ovation.
104	16	"Tested"	Paul McCrane	Russel Friend & Garrett Lerner	April 15, 2014	5ARC16	2.44
Artie tests positive for chlamydia and is forced to tell all his sexual partners. While going on a date with Julie, the girl he has a crush on, Artie confesses his STD, causing her to leave. Blaine's personal insecurities lead to relationship problems between him and Kurt, who has begun exercising more. Blaine confesses that he feels insecure now that Kurt is changing in his physique and personality; Kurt assures him that he will always be with him, and tells him that they have to be honest with each other. Mercedes reveals that she's still a virgin, and questions whether she wants to lose her virginity to Sam. She seeks advice from Rachel, who states that she and Finn loved each other when she lost her virginity. Mercedes ultimately decides that she will wait until marriage, and Sam accepts her decision. Mercedes and Rachel have a conversation about dating; Rachel confesses that she is still waiting to be ready before seeing people again.
105	17	"Opening Night"	Eric Stoltz	Michael Hitchcock	April 22, 2014	5ARC17	2.45
Will, Sue, Santana and Tina visit New York to watch Rachel's official Broadway opening night in Funny Girl. Rachel initially experiences a bout of self-doubt before the opening night, but manages to go through with the show after a pep talk from Santana. Rachel reveals to Will that she bought a ticket for Finn. Will is suddenly called back to Lima when Emma goes into labor, while Sue stays behind and falls in love with a restaurateur named Mario over their shared disdain for Broadway. Rachel thinks of Finn while performing "Who Are You Now?" and becomes tearful. The show ultimately goes smoothly, and Rachel turns down an invitation to a Broadway cast party to instead visit a gay bar with her McKinley friends. The following morning, Santana reads the New York Times review, which is positive towards Rachel's performance. Will calls Rachel, revealing that he has named his newborn Daniel Finn Schuester, and that he is completely happy for the first time.
106	18	"The Back-Up Plan"	Ian Brennan	Roberto Aguirre-Sacasa	April 29, 2014	5ARC18	2.41
Rachel signs with a new agent, who urges her to branch out as much as she can from her leading role as Fanny Bryce. At the expense of her commitment to Funny Girl, Rachel travels to Los Angeles under the guise of being sick to audition for a television pilot, Song of Solomon. Rachel receives a call from Sidney, the Funny Girl producer, as her understudy has injured herself; Santana convinces a furious Sidney to let her temporarily step in as Fanny. Sidney later informs Rachel that she will be fired and sued if she misses another show, rendering her unable to work on Broadway. June Dollaway, a wealthy socialite, takes Blaine under her wing and advises him to break off his engagement to Kurt and venture out into the world. Mercedes fights to have Santana record a song for her new album. Rachel is contacted by a television representative; she has not been cast in Song of Solomon, but a writer is being sent to New York for a new show.
107	19	"Old Dog, New Tricks"	Bradley Buecker	Chris Colfer	May 6, 2014	5ARC19	2.10
Gossip circulates surrounding Rachel's recent absence from Funny Girl, and Rachel discovers that the producers are furious. Santana offers to be Rachel's publicist, and the two start a dog rescue charity in order to salvage Rachel's reputation. Sam adopts a dog without consulting Mercedes. Despite acknowledging that Sam would be a responsible pet owner, Mercedes convinces him to return the dog, stating that they are both too busy to give a dog the attention it deserves. Kurt befriends a retired Broadway performer, Maggie Banks, and steps in as a last-minute replacement for the lead role in her retirement home's production of Peter Pan. Kurt helps rekindle the relationship between Maggie Banks and her daughter Clara, who is resentful at having been neglected as a child by her ambitious mother. Rachel and Santana's business doesn't start out well initially, but eventually becomes a hit and they perform with residents from the retirement home.
108	20	"The Untitled Rachel Berry Project"	Brad Falchuk	Matthew Hodgson	May 13, 2014	5ARC20	1.87
Mary Halloran, an eccentric TV writer, shadows Rachel and her friends to develop a script for Rachel's new show. Rachel is nonplussed by Mary's ideas and the group dislikes Mary's initial script. Moved by a musical performance from Rachel, Mary agrees to redo the script, but warns Rachel that the network will never make a pilot from it. In advance of their NYADA showcase, Blaine confesses to Kurt that he is not actually in the show; Kurt is furious that Blaine has again lied to him. After performing with June at her showcase, Blaine mends fences with Kurt by asking him to sing a duet as an encore. June is initially angry, but ultimately admits to Blaine that she was wrong. Sam and Mercedes realize that their commitment to each other may be too much to handle in the midst of their diverging career paths, and they decide to formally end their relationship. Sam reveals that he is moving back to Lima, and is later seen visiting the former choir room at McKinley. Rachel receives a call from the network: they want her to film the pilot.

== Production ==
The season's production was set to begin in mid-July, with shooting commencing July 29, 2013. On July 18, 2013, it was announced the show would go on a two-week hiatus while its writers and producers rewrote the storylines and figured out how to handle the death of Monteith's character, Finn Hudson. On July 19, 2013, the show announced through their Facebook page that the season would premiere September 26, one week after the original date, and filming would begin in early August. The season ultimately began shooting on August 5, 2013, a week later than originally planned, though studio recording and costume fittings for the cast began four days earlier.

On July 20, 2013, Ryan Murphy stated in an interview that Monteith's character would die in the third episode of the season and that episodes one and two will be tribute episodes to the Beatles. Lea Michele, Monteith's girlfriend who also stars as Rachel Berry on the show, was involved in the decision. After the third episode was completed, there was another hiatus while the creative team reworked the rest of the season. The show returned after the baseball postseason was over, and aired five episodes in a row without interruption.

For the 100th episode, Fox ran a promotion called "Gleeks Choice" at the end of November 2013 where fans could choose ten songs from a list of thirty that were performed in the past episodes of the series. The ten songs that received the most votes would be featured in the episode. The list of thirteen songs that was eventually released in late February 2014 for the two-part 100th episode contained eight songs from the original thirty-song list, not ten.

On March 17, 2014, it was revealed that Chris Colfer would write an episode. It was later revealed that he will be writing the nineteenth episode of the season.

== Cast ==
Glee season 5 main cast

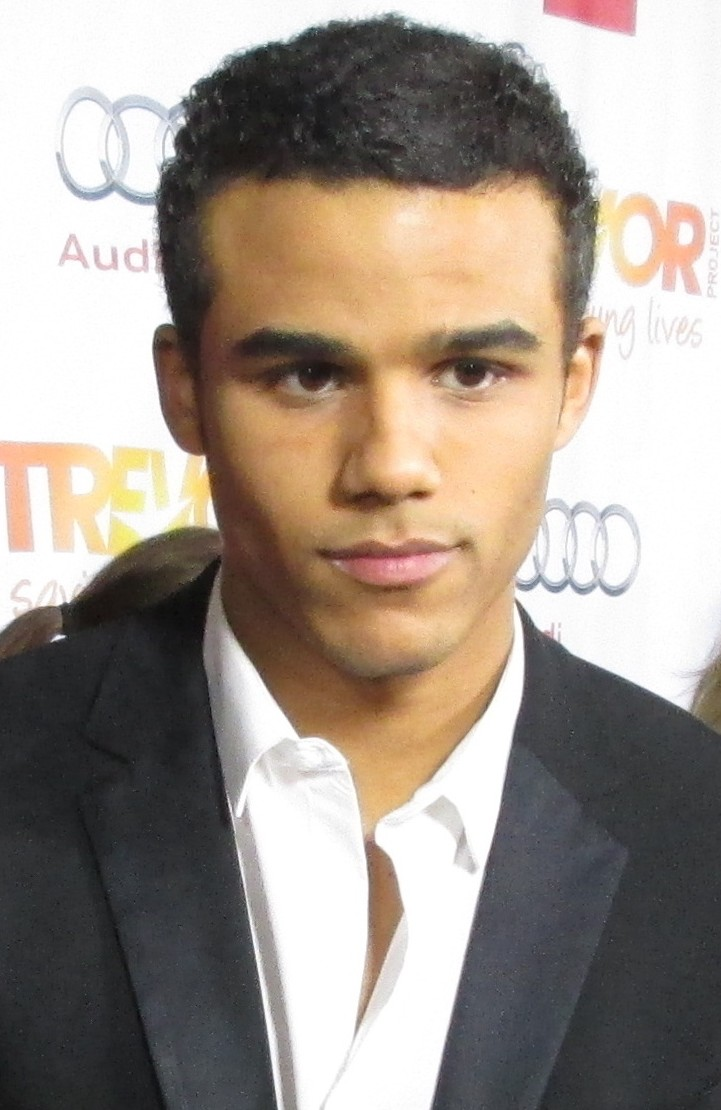
Jacob Artist

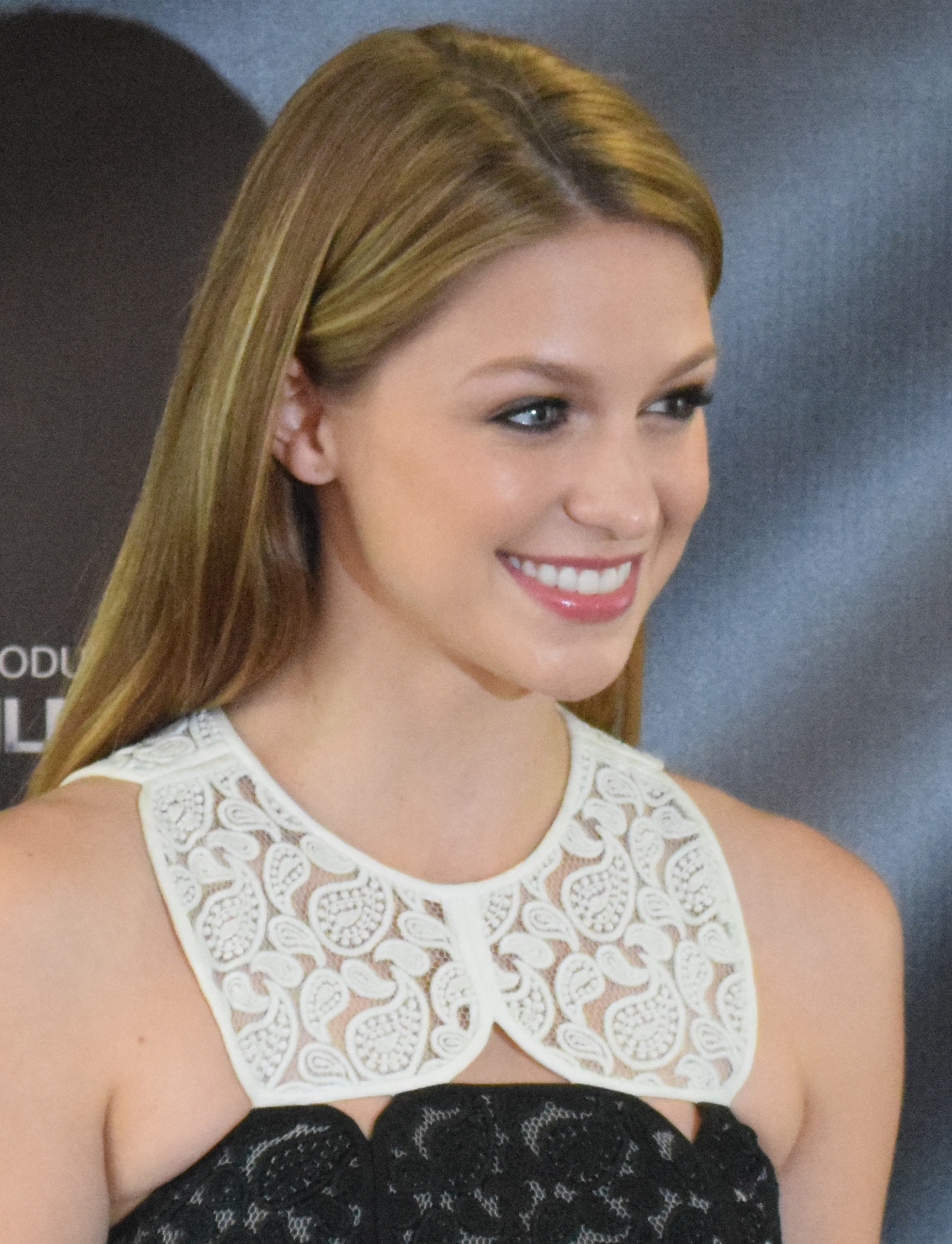
Melissa Benoist

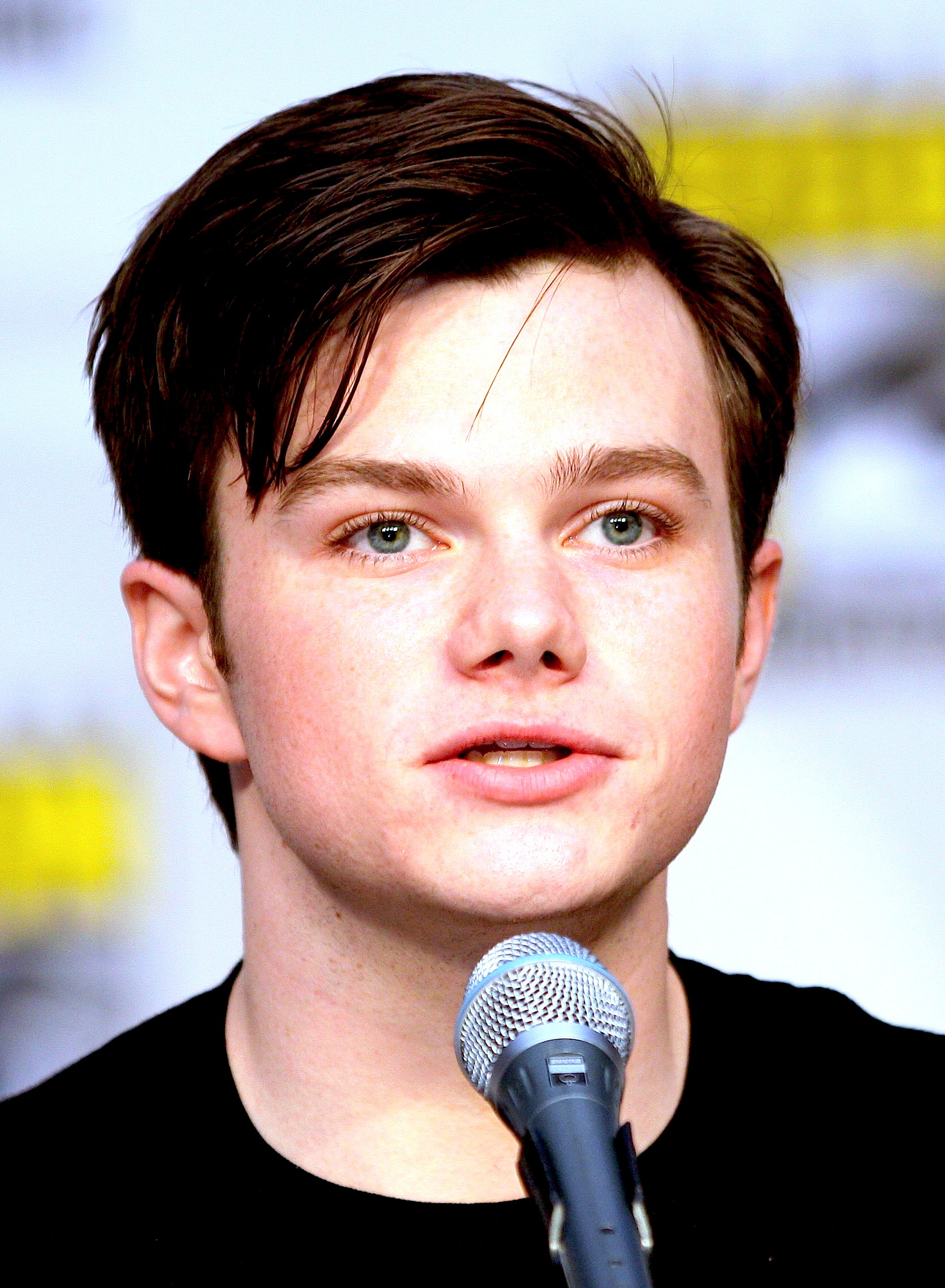
Chris Colfer

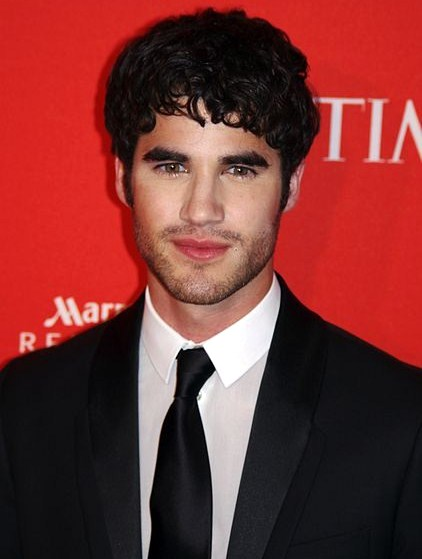
Darren Criss

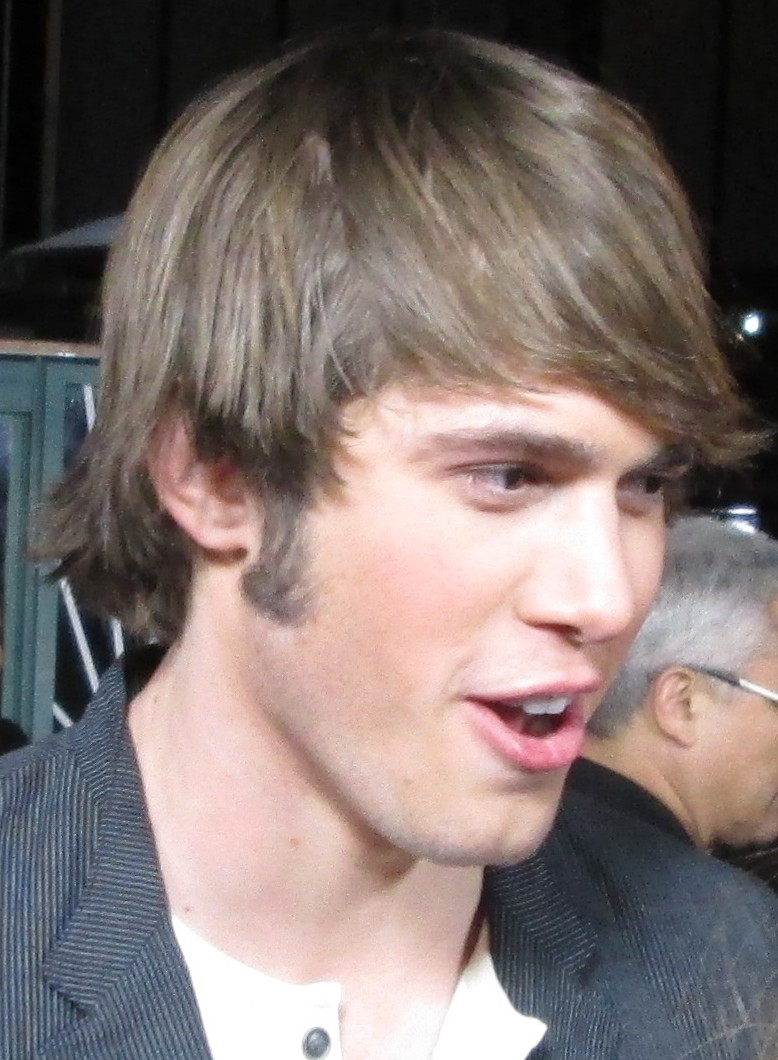
Blake Jenner

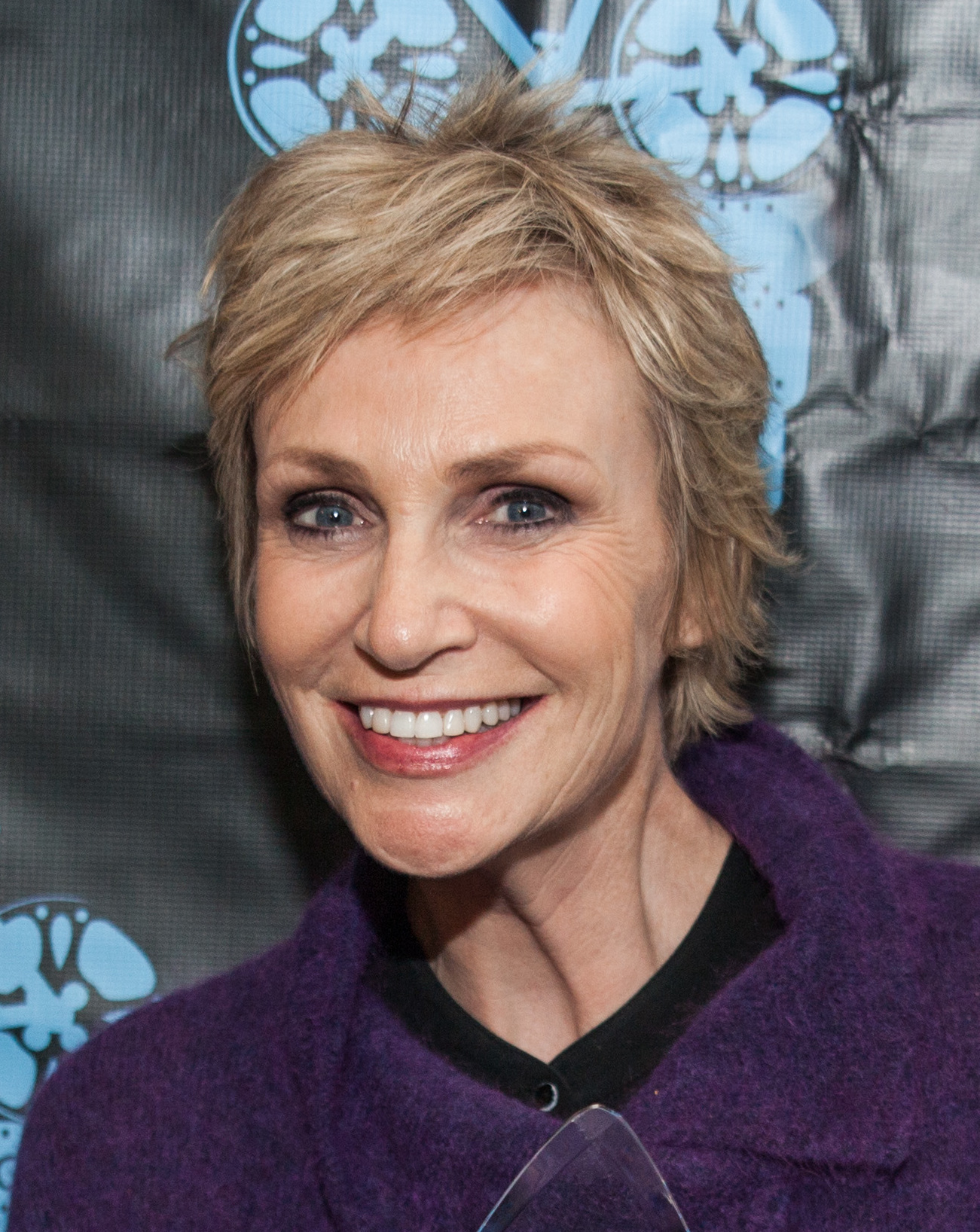
Jane Lynch

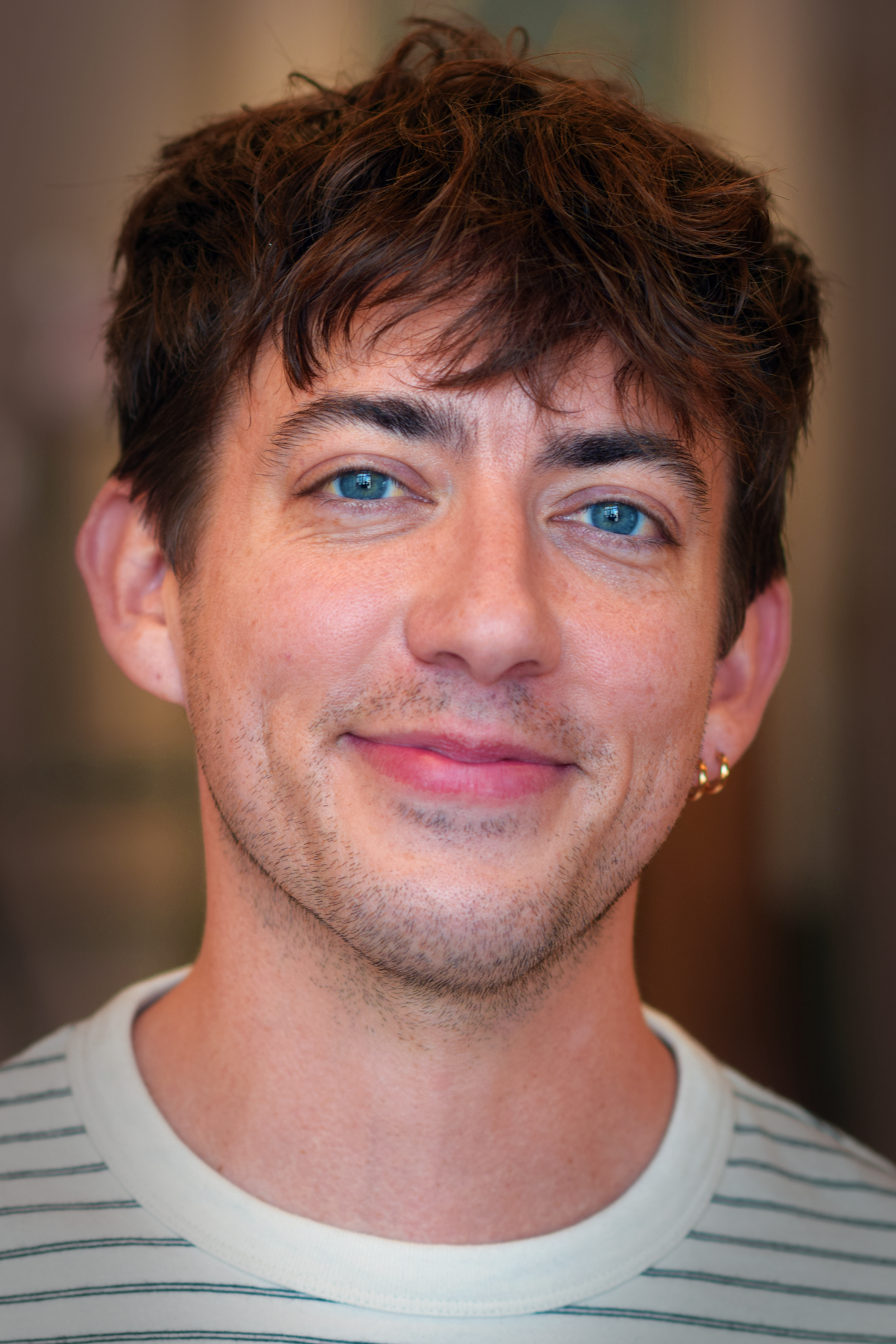
Kevin McHale

Lea Michele

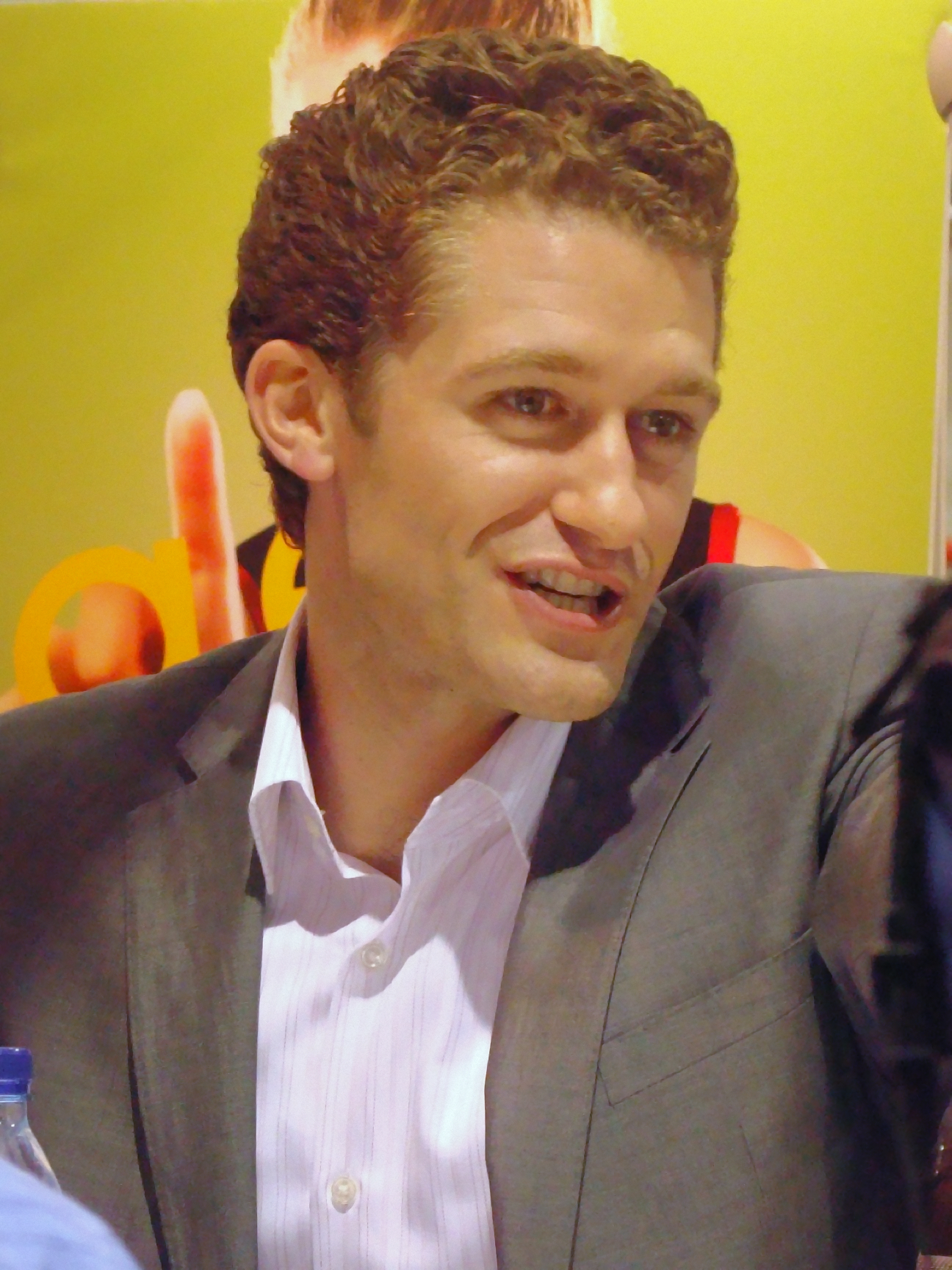
Matthew Morrison

Alex Newell

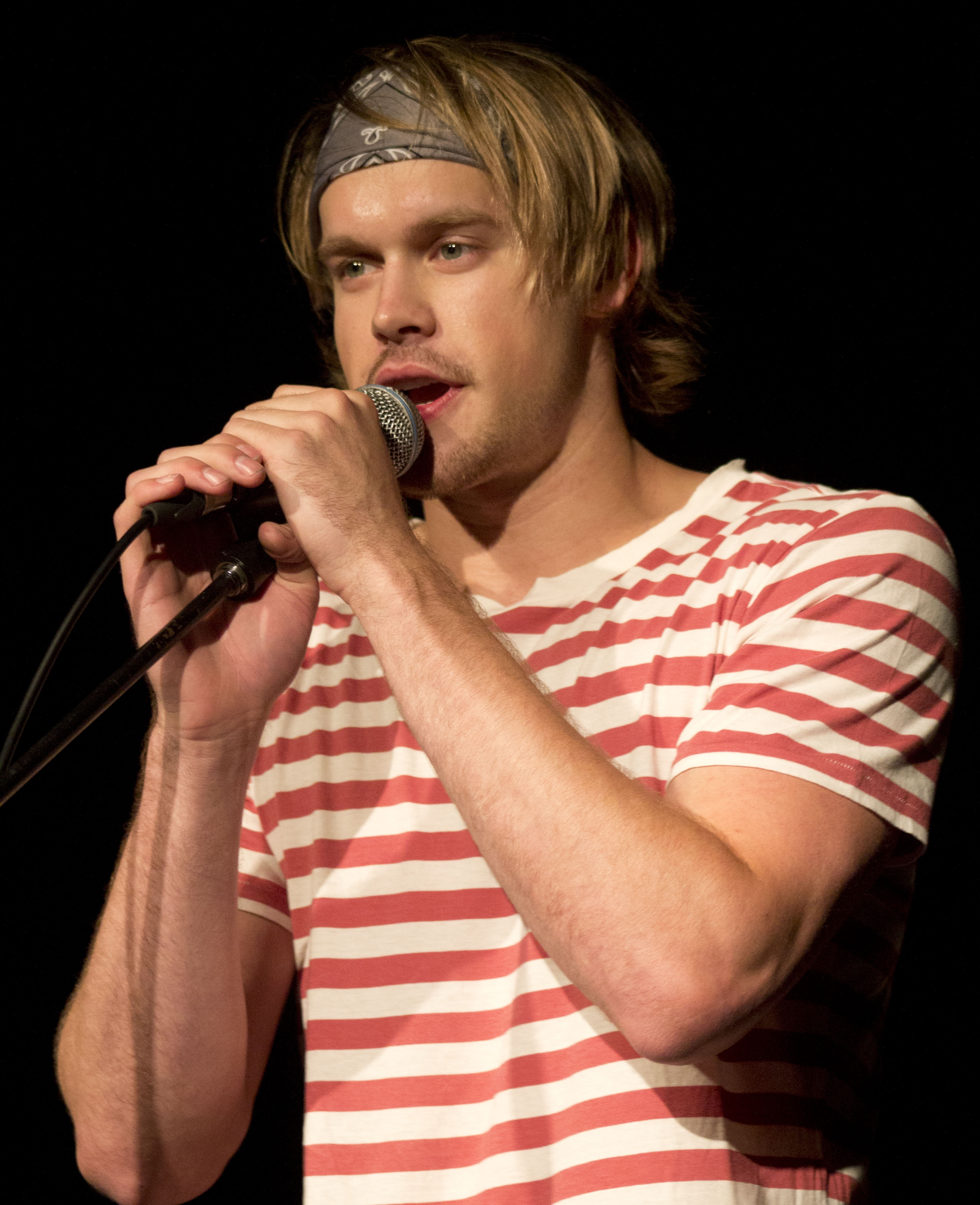
Chord Overstreet

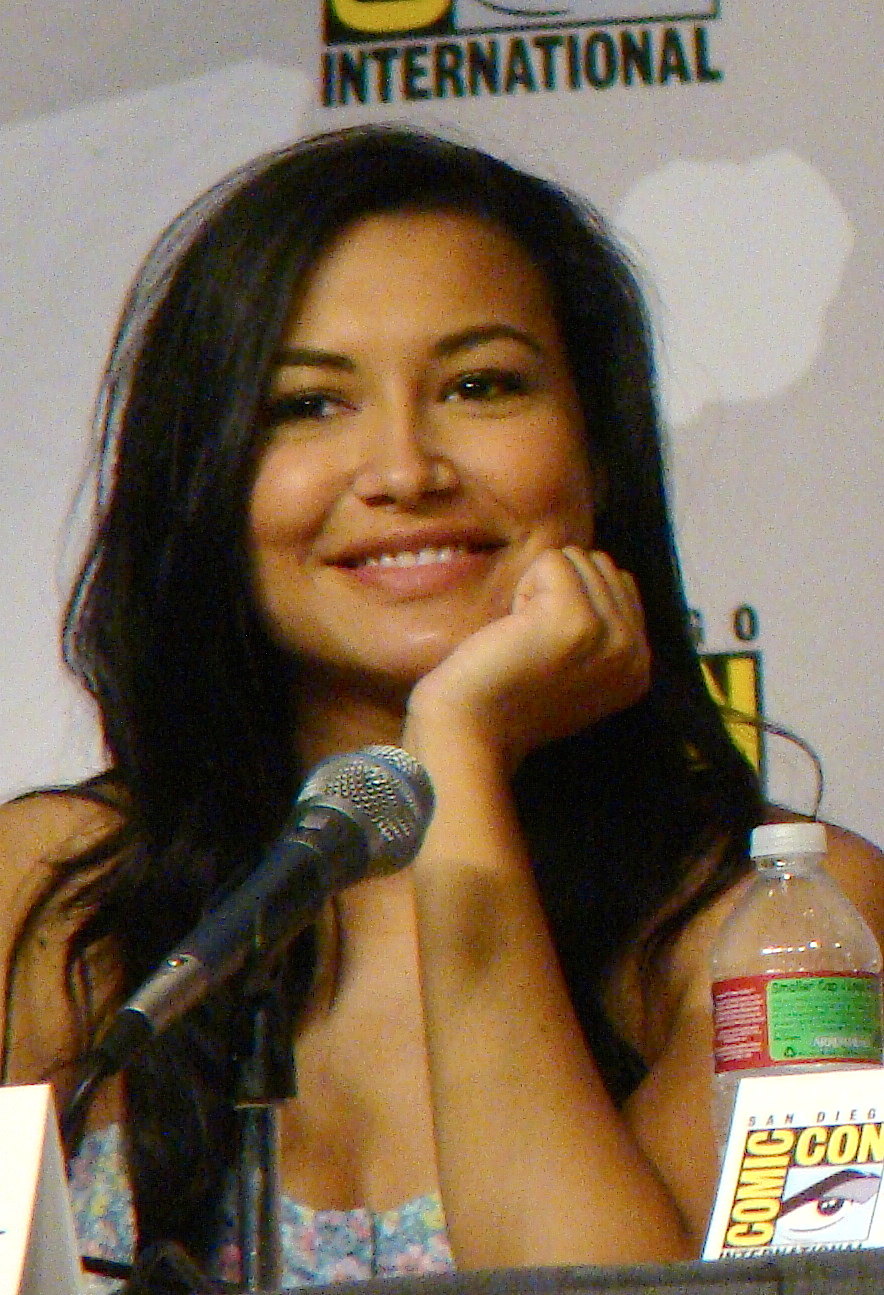
Naya Rivera

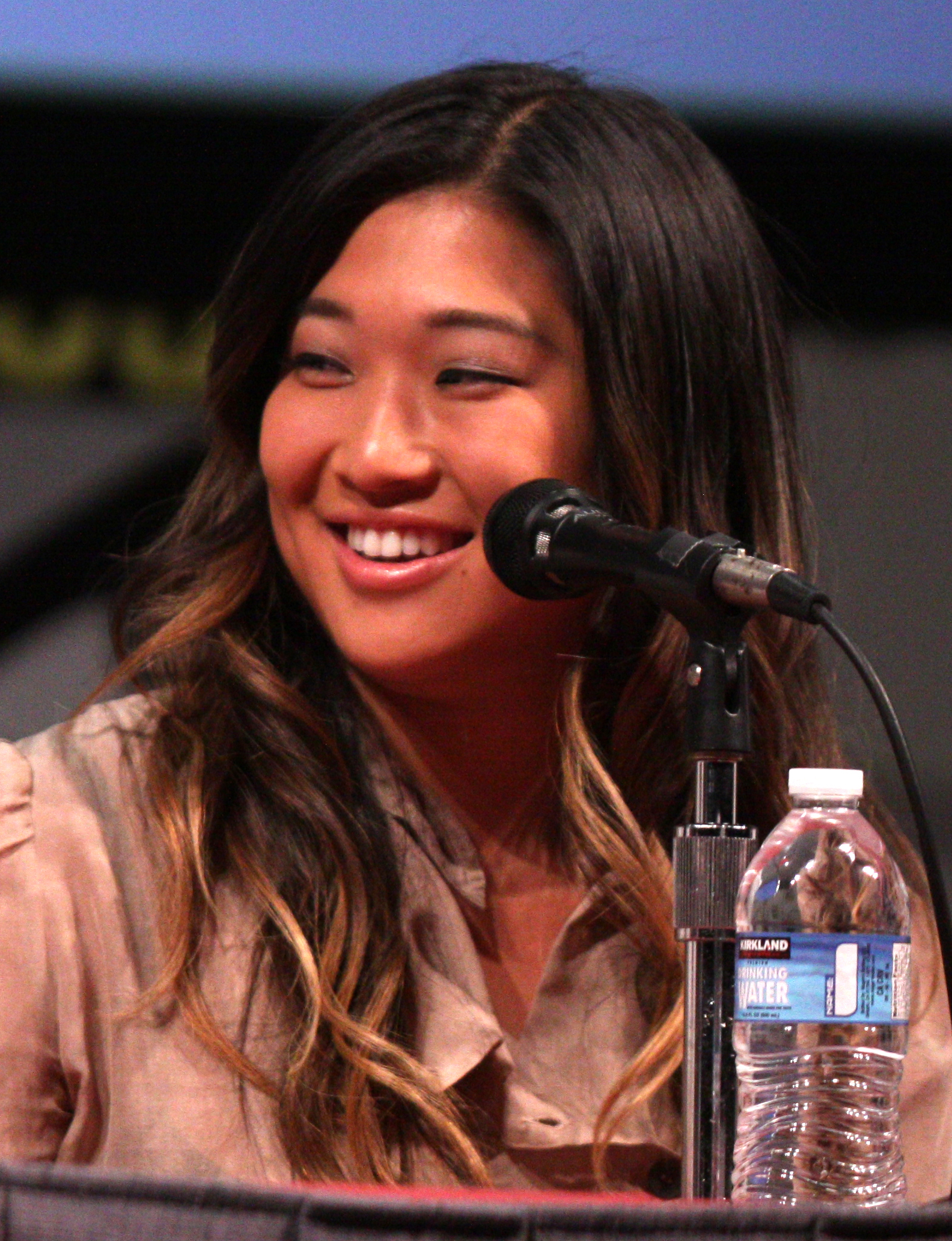
Jenna Ushkowitz

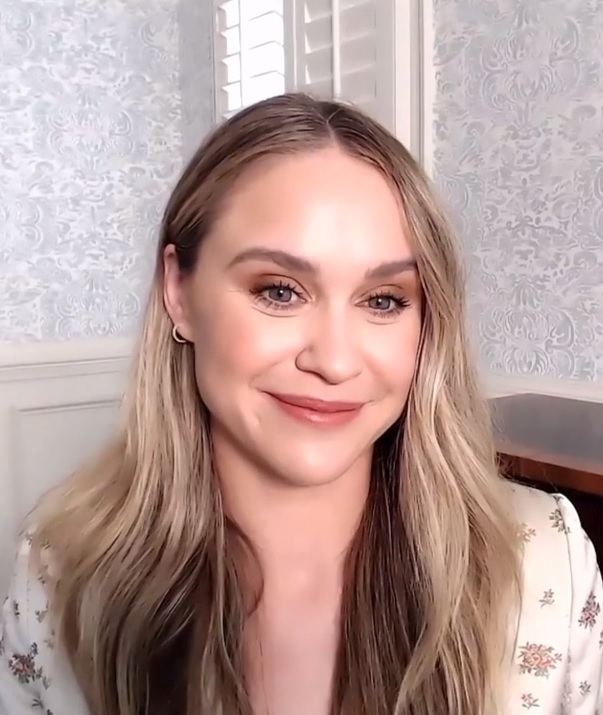
Becca Tobin

Fox credits fourteen main cast members for the season: Matthew Morrison as glee club director Will Schuester; Jane Lynch as cheerleading coach Sue Sylvester; Chris Colfer, Lea Michele and Naya Rivera as McKinley graduates and former glee club members Kurt Hummel, Rachel Berry and Santana Lopez, respectively; and Jacob Artist, Melissa Benoist, Darren Criss, Blake Jenner, Kevin McHale, Alex Newell, Chord Overstreet, Becca Tobin and Jenna Ushkowitz as current glee club members Jake Puckerman, Marley Rose, Blaine Anderson, Ryder Lynn, Artie Abrams, Wade "Unique" Adams, Sam Evans, Kitty Wilde and Tina Cohen-Chang, respectively. Five actors received contractual upgrades, having formerly been recurring cast members: Artist, Benoist, Jenner, Newell and Tobin. Five actors depart the main cast: Cory Monteith (Finn Hudson), who died on July 13, 2013; and Heather Morris (Brittany Pierce), Amber Riley (Mercedes Jones), Mark Salling (Noah "Puck" Puckerman) and Harry Shum, Jr. (Mike Chang). Riley, Salling and Shum have been listed among the guest cast for this season. Murphy tweeted on December 3, 2013, that he had asked all original cast members to return for the 100th episode — Riley, Salling and Shum returned, and Morris made her season five debut in this episode alongside Dianna Agron, who portrays Quinn Fabray. Kristin Chenoweth and Gwyneth Paltrow, April Rhodes and Holly Holliday on Glee, respectively, also returned for the 100th episode.

Two former main cast members, who appeared as recurring guest stars in the fourth season, have been cast in series regular roles in new television shows: Mike O'Malley on Welcome to the Family, and Jayma Mays on The Millers. O'Malley and Mays also confirmed their appearances. NeNe Leakes also returned as a recurring guest, by which point Dot-Marie Jones already filmed scenes for the season's third episode. Trisha Rae Stahl, who plays McKinley lunch lady (and Marley's mother) Millie Rose, appeared as well. Chace Crawford appeared on Glee's 100th episode as a Yale student named Biff who was also Quinn's new boyfriend. Iqbal Theba was also slated to return as a recurring character.

Ryan Murphy announced that Adam Lambert would join the cast during the fifth season; Chris Colfer later revealed that Lambert is to play the "nemesis" to Colfer's character, Kurt Hummel, who is a student at the New York Academy of Dramatic Arts (NYADA). It was initially reported that Demi Lovato was in negotiations to join the cast for a six-episode arc starting with the season's second episode as Dani, a friend of Santana (Naya Rivera) and Rachel (Michele) in New York, who also would interact and sing with Lambert's character; the show subsequently confirmed that Lovato would be joining the show. However, Lovato only appeared four episodes during the season, due to her commitments of The Neon Lights Tour. Lea Michele tweeted on August 22, 2013, that her friend Phoebe Strole would be appearing on Glee during the season; her character, Penny Owen, was a sophomore in college and a new love interest for Sam Evans (Chord Overstreet). Erinn Westbrook was cast as a new recurring McKinley cheerleader, Bree, said to be a "mean girl".

Early on, there were reports of seven new recurring characters being cast: three women and four men. The former included Ruby, a new African-American student at McKinley High, and two women in their twenties, Ryan, who sings and plays the guitar, and a "cute and quirky" character variously named Julie and Jenny, who will first appear in the second episode. So far, three characters have appeared that fit these descriptions, albeit with different names: an African-American student at McKinley High named Bree (played by Westbrook), a guitar-playing woman named Dani (Lovato), and Penny Owens. The four males include three men in their forties or fifties: the talented and egotistical Roderick Easton; an intelligent and good-looking teacher named Jim Elliott; and Jurgen, who speaks with an Austrian or German accent. The fourth, Henry, has just been reported by name. A character who would end up fitting the description of a man with a German or Austrian accent in his forties or fifties is Gunther (Christopher Curry), who runs the Spotlight Diner.

== Reception ==
=== Critical response ===
The review aggregator website Rotten Tomatoes gives the season a 71% with an average rating of 7.5/10, based on 14 reviews. The site's critics consensus reads, "Glee finds beauty in tragedy during a season that cathartically addresses the untimely passing of star Cory Monteith, while finding some new grace notes among its expansive ensemble, but the series is still indulging in the soporific tropes and cheesy self-seriousness that some viewers have come to dread."

=== Ratings ===
Measurements of live plus same day (DVR) viewers fell considerably, relative to previous seasons. While season 4 saw the first viewership numbers below 6 million for an episodes, season 5 saw the first viewership numbers to fall below 2 million an episode.

==== Live + SD Ratings ====
Viewership and ratings per episode of Glee season 5
No.	Title	Air date	Rating/share (18–49)	Viewers (millions)	DVR (18–49)	DVR viewers (millions)	Total (18–49)	Total viewers (millions)
1	"Love, Love, Love"	September 26, 2013	2.0/5	5.06	1.2	—N/a	3.2	—N/a
2	"Tina in the Sky with Diamonds"	October 3, 2013	1.6/5	4.42	1.1	—N/a	2.7	—N/a
3	"The Quarterback"	October 10, 2013	2.9/8	7.39	1.4	3.16	4.3	10.54
4	"A Katy or a Gaga"	November 7, 2013	1.5/4	4.01	1.1	—N/a	2.6	—N/a
5	"The End of Twerk"	November 14, 2013	1.4/4	4.22	0.9	—N/a	2.3	—N/a
6	"Movin' Out"	November 21, 2013	1.4/4	4.09	0.9	—N/a	2.3	—N/a
7	"Puppet Master"	November 28, 2013	0.9/3	2.84	—N/a	—N/a	—N/a	—N/a
8	"Previously Unaired Christmas"	December 5, 2013	1.1/3	3.29	0.9	2.05	2.0	5.34
9	"Frenemies"	February 25, 2014	1.2/3	2.99	—N/a	—N/a	—N/a	—N/a
10	"Trio"	March 4, 2014	1.0/3	2.68	0.7	—N/a	1.7	—N/a
11	"City of Angels"	March 11, 2014	0.9/3	2.30	0.6	—N/a	1.5	—N/a
12	"100"	March 18, 2014	1.1/3	2.80	0.7	—N/a	1.8	—N/a
13	"New Directions"	March 25, 2014	1.1/3	2.68	0.7	—N/a	1.8	—N/a
14	"New New York"	April 1, 2014	0.9/3	2.59	0.7	—N/a	1.6	—N/a
15	"Bash"	April 8, 2014	1.0/4	2.78	0.6	—N/a	1.6	—N/a
16	"Tested"	April 15, 2014	1.0/3	2.44	0.6	—N/a	1.6	—N/a
17	"Opening Night"	April 22, 2014	0.9/3	2.45	0.6	—N/a	1.5	—N/a
18	"The Back-Up Plan"	April 29, 2014	0.9/3	2.41	0.5	—N/a	1.4	—N/a
19	"Old Dog, New Tricks"	May 6, 2014	0.8/3	2.10	0.5	—N/a	1.3	—N/a
20	"The Untitled Rachel Berry Project"	May 13, 2014	0.6/2	1.87	0.6	—N/a	1.2	—N/a

== Home video releases ==
Glee: The Complete Fifth Season was released on January 6, 2015 in DVD, with 6-set discs. The Blu-ray only has a Japan release and is a 4 disc set.

Glee – The Complete Fifth Season
Set details	Special features	
20 episodes; 6-disc set; Running Time: 878 minutes; 1.77:1 aspect ratio; English; Subtitles: English, French, Spanish	Glee in the City; Glee Music Jukebox; GLEEful: Celebrating 100 Episodes of Glee	
DVD release dates
Region 1	Region 2	Region 4
January 6, 2015	October 20, 2014	October 9, 2014
