= Love, Love, Love (Glee) =

- Glee episode
- Episode no.: Season 5 Episode 1
- Directed by: Bradley Buecker
- Written by: Brad Falchuk
- Production code: 5ARC01
- Original air date: September 26, 2013

Guest appearances
- Ioan Gruffudd as Paolo San Pablo; Peter Facinelli as Rupert Campion; Amber Riley as Mercedes Jones; Mike O'Malley as Burt Hummel; Iqbal Theba as Principal Figgins; NeNe Leakes as Roz Washington; Michael Hitchcock as Dalton Rumba; Grant Gustin as Sebastian Smythe; Erinn Westbrook as Bree; Christopher Cousins as Superintendent Bob Harris; Christopher Curry as Gunther

Episode chronology
← Previous "All or Nothing"	Next → "Tina in the Sky with Diamonds"
- Glee season 5

"Love, Love, Love" is the premiere episode of the fifth season of the American musical television series Glee, and the eighty-ninth episode overall. The episode was written by series co-creator Brad Falchuk and directed by Bradley Buecker, and first aired on September 26, 2013 on Fox in the United States.

The episode was the first of two tribute episodes to the Beatles. It features the marriage proposal by Blaine Anderson (Darren Criss) to Kurt Hummel (Chris Colfer), the revelation of Rachel Berry's (Lea Michele) future on Broadway, the official dating of Artie Abrams (Kevin McHale) and Kitty Wilde (Becca Tobin), and the return of Sue Sylvester (Jane Lynch) to Mckinley High School as the new principal. Two special guest stars debut on the show: Peter Facinelli as Rupert Campion, the Funny Girl director and Ioan Gruffudd as Paolo San Pablo, the Funny Girl lead actor.

The episode received mixed to positive reviews, with many critics highlighting Blaine and Kurt's storyline and the episode's ending scene. Upon its initial airing, this episode was viewed by 5.06 million American viewers and garnered a 2.0/5 Nielsen rating/share in the 18–49 age group. The total viewership and ratings for this episode were down slightly from the previous episode, "All or Nothing".

An album was released on September 24, 2013 to coincide with the premiere of the episode, which features music from this episode and the episode "Tina in the Sky with Diamonds". The album, Glee Sings the Beatles, has received generally positive reviews from critics.

== Plot ==
In New York City, Rachel Berry (Lea Michele) attends a chemistry reading for Funny Girl, but it is brief and she later hears the director and leading man worry that she is too young, and sings "Yesterday" in frustration. She begins working as a waitress in a singing Broadway diner with Santana Lopez (Naya Rivera) in order to make ends meet and gain life experience. The Funny Girl director and actor show up one day, and Rachel seizes a second chance to impress them by singing "A Hard Day's Night" with Santana.

Glee club director Will Schuester (Matthew Morrison) gives New Directions a two-week assignment covering the Beatles, with the first week focusing on their early years. Artie Abrams (Kevin McHale) serenades Kitty Wilde (Becca Tobin) with "Drive My Car" and invites her to a carnival. They are seen together by a new cheerleader, Bree (Erinn Westbrook), who Kitty realizes is trying to sabotage her. She then asks Artie to keep their relationship a secret to preserve her popularity, which he reluctantly agrees to. Their relationship blossoms, though there are problems, as revealed in a further performance, this of "You've Got to Hide Your Love Away". When Tina Cohen-Chang (Jenna Ushkowitz) finds out about Artie and Kitty's relationship, she attempts to convince Artie to go public with the relationship, but he refuses. She later reveals to the glee club that the two are dating, and Kitty agrees that she and Artie should now publicly be a couple.

Sue Sylvester (Jane Lynch) is free to return to McKinley High, as Becky Jackson (Lauren Potter) has confessed that she had brought the gun to school that went off accidentally, and Sue lied to protect her. Sue frames Principal Figgins (Iqbal Theba) by planting pornography and other unsuitable material in his office, where it is discovered by the authorities. Figgins is then demoted to janitor, while Sue is brought in to replace him as interim principal, and schemes to be given the job permanently. She informs Will and Roz Washington (NeNe Leakes), Sue's replacement as coach of the Cheerios, that they must win Nationals competitions in show choir and cheerleading, respectively, or be fired.

Kurt Hummel (Chris Colfer) and Blaine Anderson (Darren Criss) rekindle their relationship with a performance of "Got to Get You into My Life", and Blaine decides to move forward with his plan to propose to Kurt. He and Sam Evans (Chord Overstreet) rally New Directions, Vocal Adrenaline, the Dalton Academy Warblers and the Haverbrook Deaf Choir to participate in Blaine's proposal through a performance of "Help!".

Blaine becomes concerned by Tina's bitterness and recruits Sam, Jake Puckerman (Jacob Artist) and Ryder Lynn (Blake Jenner) to cheer her up through a performance of "I Saw Her Standing There". Tina is then given the opportunity to choose Blaine, Sam or Ryder as her date for prom, and selects Sam.

Burt Hummel (Mike O'Malley) is supposedly driving Kurt to the airport, but Kurt reveals he knows he's really being driven to hear Blaine's proposal and doesn't know what to do. Burt tells him to balance the pros and the cons, and always remember that life is short. They arrive at Dalton Academy, where Blaine serenades Kurt with "All You Need Is Love", accompanied by the four glee clubs, and with Rachel, Santana, Mercedes Jones (Amber Riley) and Burt in attendance. Blaine then proposes in the spot where the two first met, and Kurt says yes.

== Production ==
The season's production was set to begin in mid-July, with shooting commencing July 29, 2013. After actor Cory Monteith's death, it was announced the show would be going on a short hiatus while its writers and producers figured out how to proceed, and how to adjust the season's planned storylines given the absence of Finn Hudson, Monteith's role. On July 19, 2013, Glee announced through their official Facebook fan page that the season premiere would air on September 26, one week after the original date, and filming would begin in early August. The season ultimately began shooting on August 5, 2013, a week later than originally planned, though studio recording and costume fittings for the cast began four days earlier. Location shooting for the episode took place in New York City on September 9 and 10, 2013; both Ryan Murphy and Lea Michele tweeted photos from the shoot.

According to co-creator Murphy, the first two episodes of the fifth season had been written in May 2013, and would be tribute episodes to the Beatles. The Beatles tribute had been in the works for four years. This first episode was written by co-creator Brad Falchuk, and directed by executive producer Bradley Buecker.

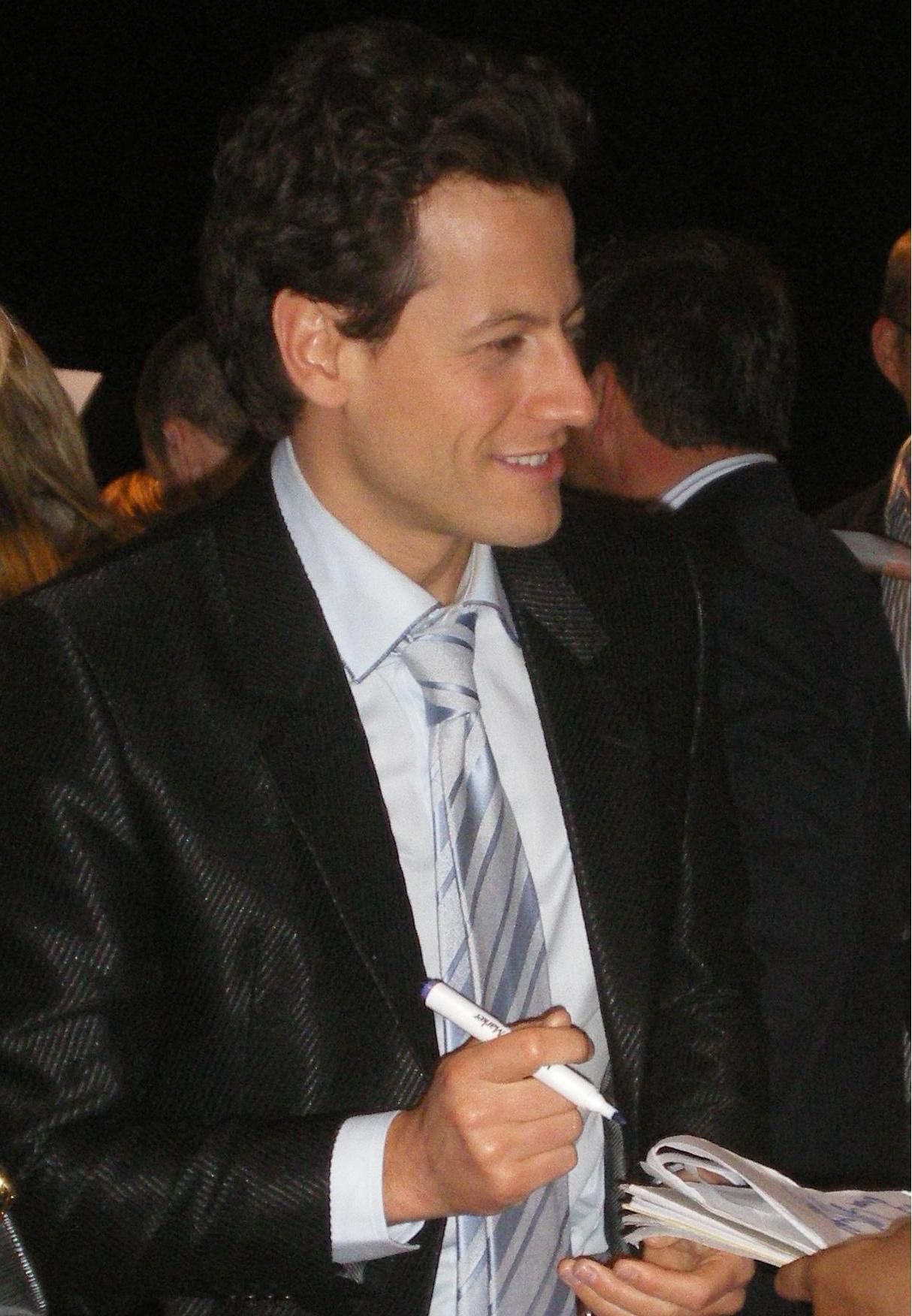
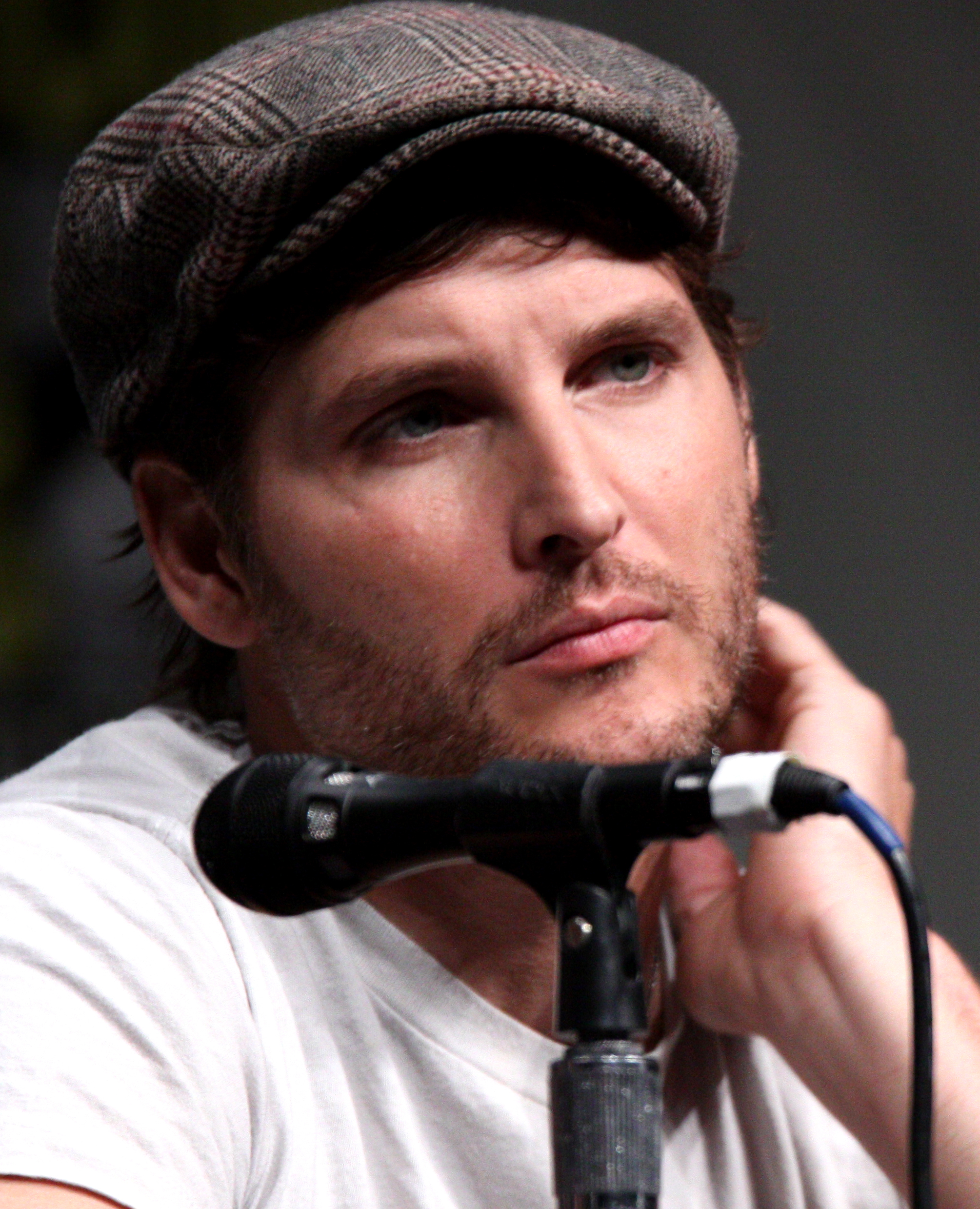
Specials guest stars Ioan Gruffudd (left) and Peter Facinelli (right) appear in "Love, Love, Love" as part of the Funny Girl production.

This is the first episode that the actors playing the roles of Jake Puckerman (Jacob Artist), Marley Rose (Melissa Benoist), Kitty Wilde (Becca Tobin), Wade "Unique" Adams (Alex Newell) and Ryder Lynn (Blake Jenner) have been given main cast credits. All five were first reported as being promoted to the main cast at the end of June 2013.

Two new special guest stars appeared in the episode in New York sequences. Peter Facinelli played the Funny Girl director, Rupert Campion, and Ioan Gruffudd the lead male actor in the show, Paolo San Pablo.

Erinn Westbrook debuts as a new recurring McKinley cheerleader, Bree, who is said to be a "mean girl". Other recurring characters in this episode included former glee club member Mercedes Jones (Amber Riley), Kurt's father Burt Hummel (Mike O'Malley), cheerleading coach Roz Washington (NeNe Leakes), Principal Figgins (Iqbal Theba) and Haverbrook School for the Deaf choir director Dalton Rumba (Michael Hitchcock). Dalton Academy Warbler Sebastian Smythe (Grant Gustin) makes his final appearance in this episode.

Eight of the Beatles songs appear on this episode: "Yesterday", sung by Michele; "Drive My Car", sung by McHale and Tobin; "Got to Get You into My Life", performed by Criss and Colfer; "You've Got to Hide Your Love Away", also performed by Tobin and McHale; "Help!", sung by Criss and Overstreet; "A Hard Day's Night", performed by Michele and Rivera; "I Saw Her Standing There", performed by Criss, Overstreet, Artist and Jenner; and "All You Need Is Love", performed by Criss. The songs from this episode and the next one have been released on the album Glee Sings the Beatles, which contains fourteen songs by the Glee cast originally written and performed by the Beatles. The album was made available for pre-order on iTunes on September 10, 2013, and was released on September 24, 2013, two days before the season premiere.

== Reception ==
=== Ratings ===
"Love, Love, Love" was first broadcast on September 26, 2013 in the United States. It garnered a 2.0/5 Nielsen rating/share and received 5.06 million American viewers during its initial airing. Viewership and ratings were down slightly from those of the previous episode, "All or Nothing", which was watched by 5.92 million American viewers and acquired a 2.0/6 rating/share in the 18–49 demographic upon first airing.

In Canada, the episode was watched by 1.025 million viewers.

=== Critical response ===
"Love, Love, Love" was given mixed to positive reviews by critics. Miranda Wicker of TV Fanatic gave the episode a 3.5 out of 5, saying the episode "was a technicolor return for the series, full of fun music for the audience to keep the audience singing along. But Finn Hudson's absence is evident." She commented negatively on the season's time-jump, saying "[it] robbed the audience of some good moments," but commented positively on Blaine's proposal speech, calling it "beautiful."

Lauren Hoffman of Vulture gave the episode a 4 out of 5, saying " it was a strong hour of Glee: fun, vibrant, and (against all odds) aware of continuity and character development. And if some of the vocal arrangements felt too derivative, well, then, at least they were derivative of the Beatles, and everyone likes the Beatles." Also, in regards to Finn's absence, she said

"it was surreal (and maybe even the tiniest bit morbid) to watch the New Directions kids ride around on bumper cars and dance through confetti and jump on tabletops knowing that Finn is never coming back. The show didn’t reference him at all last night, and likely won’t mention him again until the October 10th episode, which will be an hour-long tribute to both Finn and Cory Monteith. I understand the practical and emotional concerns that kept Glee from addressing his death at the outset of the season, but it was jarring to get absorbed in last night’s episode and then suddenly remember why Finn wasn’t there."

The Associated Press noted how the premiere offered "a subtle, sad reminder of the late Glee star Cory Monteith" in the scene where Rachel "gaze[s] at a photo on her cellphone: It's a group shot of her old high school glee club pals, among them Monteith's Finn Hudson."

Katy Kroll of Rolling Stone also made note of Cory's absence, saying "Try as the show might, the July 13th death of Cory Monteith at age 31 of a drug overdose left a dark cloud hanging over the Season Five premiere – no matter what the show's stars and producers were hoping we'd see;" she then reacted positively to Blaine and Kurt's storyline, calling it "cuter than cute." Laurel Brown of Zap2it said for the engagement scene, the writers "went all-out on this one, didn't they? One should not be touched by the beautiful proposal of a teenaged boy. But oh, is it touching! We'll allow it."

Beth Douglass of Wetpaint gave the episode a more mixed review, specifically about the episode's theme, saying

"the New Directions do a lot of really cool stuff—like dress up as the Beatles, run around a carnival, etc.—all of which we meet with only moderate interest. Don’t get us wrong. We love them. It’s just that all of this pales in comparison to the mind-blowing romantic epicness that is about to go down,"

referring to Blaine and Kurt's storyline, which she commented positively on, saying "it's the most wonderful, beautiful, perfect proposal we’ve ever seen in our entire lives." Finally, she noted "though this season will no doubt have its painful and emotional moments, there is plenty of hope and happiness in store this season."

Brandon Nowalk of The A.V. Club also gave the episode a mixed review, grading it a C+. He commented that the episode "isn’t much of an episode, much less a premiere, but it’s one hell of an antacid." Rae Votta of Billboard also gave the episode a mixed review, and wrote that

Glee is now a completely different show from whatever creator Ryan Murphy intended, for better or for worse. It had to come back sometime, and instead of pulling off the bandage of grief upfront, Glee gave themselves a soft landing with a two-part season opener focused on the music of The Fab Four. While Glee has dabbled in the Beatles before, the hyper-focus special episode format keeps us feeling familiar, safe and generally upbeat as we transition into the brand new Glee world.

== Music ==
An album was released on September 24, 2013 to coincide with the premiere of the episode, which features music from this episode and the episode "Tina in the Sky with Diamonds."

=== Commentary ===
The album, Glee Sings the Beatles, has received generally positive reviews from critics. Heather Phares of AllMusic wrote: "The July 2013 death of Cory Monteith, cast a pall on the beginning of Glee's fifth season", then she added that two of the album's songs, concretely "Yesterday" and "Let It Be" were "bookended versions of the Fab Four's cheerier fare with subdued renditions of two of the band's most poignant songs". Phares also commented positively on how "[the album] could have left the cast's women stuck on the sidelines as screaming Beatlemaniacs, [but instead] it had the ladies front and center [on songs] like the sweet rendition of "Here Comes the Sun" and the playful take on "A Hard Day's Night". She then calls the album as "a promising start to season five's music".
