= Hey Monday discography =

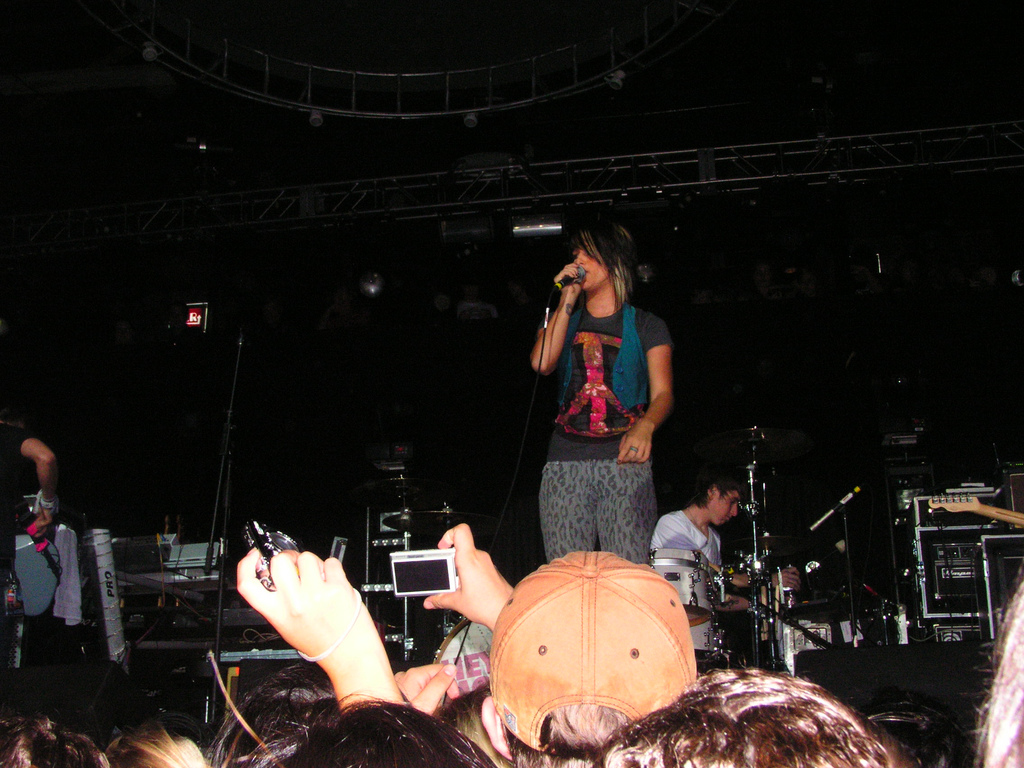
- Hey Monday live
- Studio albums: 1
- Extended plays: 2
- Singles: 4
- Music videos: 4
- Other appearances: 1

This following is a comprehensive listing of official releases by Hey Monday, a four-piece American pop punk band, formed in 2008 in West Palm Beach, Florida. They released their debut album Hold On Tight in 2008 which produced notable singles "Homecoming" and "How You Love Me Now". The album was followed up with their 2010 EP Beneath It All, which achieved moderate commercial success and Candles EP in 2011. The Christmas EP was self-released and came on December 6 later that year. However, the band is no longer together.

== Studio albums ==
Year	Album details	Peak chart positions	
Year	Album details	US Heat	AUS
2008	Hold On Tight: Release date: October 7, 2008; Label: Columbia Records	11	71

== Extended plays ==
Year	Album details	Peak chart positions		
Year	Album details	US	US Rock	US Alt
2010	Beneath It All: Release date: August 17, 2010; Label: Columbia Records	25	9	5
2011	Candles: Release date: February 8, 2011; Label: Columbia Records	—	—	—
2011	The Christmas EP: Release date: December 6, 2011; Label: self-released	—	—	—

== Singles ==
Year	Title	Peak chart positions				Album
Year	Title	US Pop	US Rock Digital	JPN	AUS	Album
2008	"Homecoming"	—	—	27	97	Hold On Tight
2009	"How You Love Me Now"	37	—	—	—	Hold On Tight
2010	"I Don't Wanna Dance"	—	21	—	—	Beneath It All
2011	"Candles"	—	31	—	—	Candles
"—" denotes releases that did not chart.

=== Other charted songs ===
- "Hangover", "Wish You Were Here" and "In My Head".

== Music videos ==
Year	Title	Director
2008	"Homecoming"	Noah Shulman
2009	"How You Love Me Now"	Luga Podesta
2010	"I Don't Wanna Dance"	Petro Papahadjopoulos
2011	"Candles"	

== Other appearances ==
Year	Song contributed	Release title
2008	"Homecoming" (snippet)	Welcome to the New Administration
