= Glee: The Music Presents the Warblers =

Soundtrack album by Glee Cast
- Released: April 19, 2011
- Recorded: 2010–2011
- Studios: Q Division (Somerville, Massachusetts); New York City
- Genre: Pop
- Length: 41:42
- Label: Columbia / 20th Century Fox TV
- Producers: Adam Anders; Peer Åström; Tommy Faragher; Ryan Murphy

Glee Cast chronology
Glee: The Music, Volume 5 (2011)	Glee: The Music Presents the Warblers (2011)	Glee: The Music, Volume 6 (2011)

Glee: The Music Presents the Warblers is the seventh soundtrack album by the cast of Glee, a musical comedy-drama television series that aired on Fox in the United States. Released through Columbia Records on April 19, 2011, it contains thirteen covers: eleven accompanying performances from the series' second season and two exclusive to the album. Performers are portrayed on Glee as the fictional Dalton Academy Warblers, an all-male high school glee club from Westerville, Ohio. Darren Criss serves as lead vocalist, with Chris Colfer singing lead on one track and co-lead on a couple of others, while the Beelzebubs, an all-male a cappella group from Tufts University, provide background vocals. Dante Di Loreto and Brad Falchuk serve as the album's executive producers, and its tracks have collectively sold over 1.3 million copies.

== Background ==
The Dalton Academy Warblers, an a cappella glee club from a fictional private school in Westerville, Ohio, were first introduced in the episode "Never Been Kissed". The episode also introduced recurring guest star Darren Criss as Blaine Anderson, lead singer and junior member of the group. Performing a cover version of Katy Perry's "Teenage Dream", actors for the Warblers lip synced to background vocals provided by the Beelzebubs, an all-male a cappella group from Tufts University in Somerville, Massachusetts. According to the Beelzebubs' president Eli Seidman, the producers of Glee were considering having the singers appear on the series, but the idea of having students flown across the continent to Los Angeles, California proved too logistically unrealistic. Kurt Hummel, portrayed by series regular Chris Colfer, enrolls in Dalton Academy in the episode "Special Education" and joins the Warblers in performances, starting as a background singer with Train's "Hey, Soul Sister". Kurt later duets with Blaine on Neon Trees' "Animal" and Hey Monday's "Candles". Song arrangements were done by Beelzebubs alumnus Ed Boyer, and vocals for all songs were recorded at Q Division Studios in Somerville, with the exception of "Teenage Dream", which was done in New York City.

The album was announced by Criss on March 7, 2011, when he appeared on Live with Regis and Kelly. Its title, front cover, and track listing were revealed in a press release on March 23, 2011, as well as its release date of April 19, 2011. The cover art shows the Warblers' uniform, along with the logos of both the glee club and the school. Two covers were arranged and released by the Beelzebubs prior to their involvement with Glee: Destiny's Child's "Bills, Bills, Bills" and Robin Thicke's "When I Get You Alone", which were respectively included on the albums Next (2001) and Pandemonium (2007). Two tracks were never used on the series, and are exclusive to the album: a cover of Barbra Streisand and Barry Gibb's "What Kind of Fool" and a cover of Rod Stewart's "Da Ya Think I'm Sexy?". The former was performed at the 2011 MusiCares Person of the Year gala and the latter was originally intended to appear in the Glee episode "Sexy", but did not. "Teenage Dream" was previously included on Glee: The Music, Volume 4, released in November 2010.

== Composition ==
The album features thirteen covers, twelve of which feature a cappella backing from the Beelzebubs. The other, a cover of The Beatles' "Blackbird", was sung by Colfer backed by other background vocalists. Though mainly pop, tracks also fall under several other genres, including rock, R&B, and hip hop, and are sometimes reinvented when rearranged. Matt Diahl of the Los Angeles Times described Glee's version of "Teenage Dream" as "The Killers meet Sigur Rós meet the Jonas Brothers". A cover of Train's "Hey, Soul Sister", which Diahl noted as similar in sound to a Bruno Mars song, required overdubbing to imitate the sound of a mandolin. Other songs on the album also took advantage of overdubbing as well as multitrack recording to create a sound "larger" than what the Beelzebubs' eleven-member group could accomplish live.

== Reception ==
Professional ratings
Review scores
Source	Rating
About.com	3.5/5 stars
Allmusic	3/5 stars
The Boston Globe	(favorable)
The Chicago Sun-Times	2/4 stars
Los Angeles Times	2/4 stars
The Salt Lake Tribune	(B)

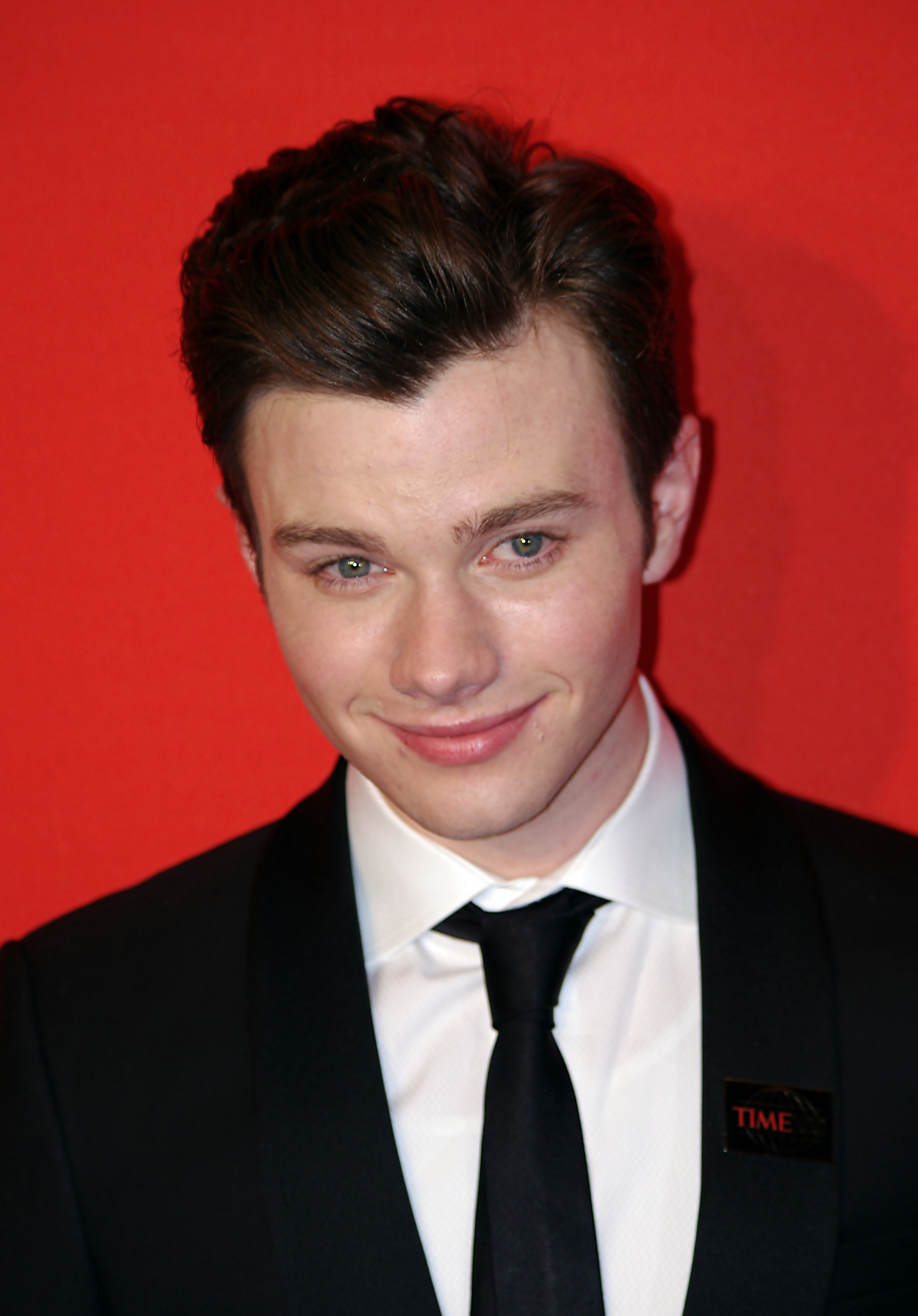
Several critics felt Chris Colfer's presence on tracks like "Blackbird" and "Candles" was lacking in strength.

Professional critics have overall given Glee: The Music Presents the Warblers generally mixed reviews. About.com's Bill Lamb reviewed the album positively, calling it "one of the best Glee collections". Though he called some of the covers "an effort to draw attention with a current pop hit", he applauded some of the other tracks, i.e. "Candles" and Keane's "Somewhere Only We Know", as some of the album's top tracks for featuring songs unfamiliar to a mainstream American audience. Andrew Leahey of Allmusic gave the album a rating of three stars out of a possible five, and felt Colfer's performance on "Blackbird" was lacking in confidence. On the other hand, he greatly admired Criss' versatility as a singer in covering songs from a range of different genres. He also praised the tracks' creative a cappella arrangements, which he felt made them more interesting than those of previous Glee releases. The Boston Globe's Nicole Cammorata gave an overall favorable review of Glee: The Music Presents the Warblers: her only negative remark was that she felt Colfer's voice on "Candles" did not work well with the song's high notes. Diehl gave the release two stars out of four and felt that, outside the context of the series, the tracks seemed somewhat over-the-top. "When I Get You Alone", for example, was noted as "too cute" for an urban song. Thomas Conner from The Chicago Sun-Times also gave the album two out of four stars, stating, "over the course of 13 tracks the Warblers' gimmick just as often degrades into laughable self-parody." David Burger of The Salt Lake Tribune enjoyed the a cappella songs in contrast to the series' conventional material, which he felt was "over-produced and over-orchestrated".

=== Commercial performance ===
The album debuted at number two on the US Billboard 200 and number one on Billboard's Soundtracks chart, selling 86,000 copies in its first week. It was the highest-charting album on the Billboard 200 from the show's second season; the next soundtrack release, Glee: The Music, Volume 6, would sell 6,000 fewer copies in its first week. The Warblers album sold 28,000 copies in its second week. On the Canadian and Australian Albums Charts, the album debuted at numbers five and six, respectively. In New Zealand, Glee: The Music Presents the Warblers debuted at number eleven. The album peaked at number forty-one on the Mexican charts. Meanwhile, the Beelzebubs have seen their releases undergo a four-fold increase in average sales per month.

== Promotion ==
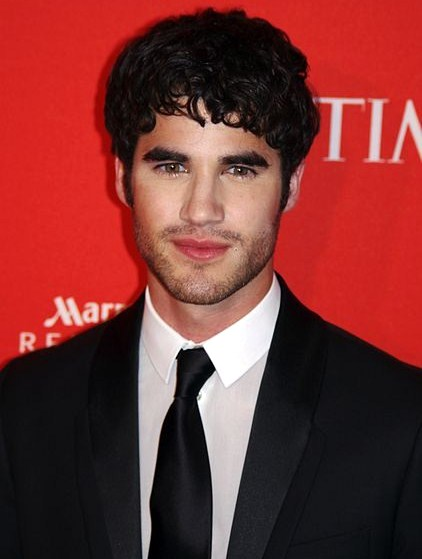
Darren Criss (pictured) appeared with the Warblers on Today and The Ellen DeGeneres Show to promote the album

The first eleven tracks from the album were released as singles, available for digital download over the course of the season. "Teenage Dream" debuted at number eight on the Billboard Hot 100 on the week of November 27, 2010. It was the best-selling song in the US that week, selling 214,000 copies, the largest figure for a Glee title, and has sold over 500,000 copies to date, having been certified a gold single on July 13, 2011. The single also charted at number ten in Canada, eighteen in Ireland, twenty-four in Australia, and thirty-six in the United Kingdom. Three other covers from the album have become top 40 hits on the Billboard Hot 100: "Hey, Soul Sister", Pink's "Raise Your Glass", and "Blackbird", at numbers 29, 36, and 37, respectively. The cover of "Blackbird" marks the first time the song has charted on the Hot 100. "Hey, Soul Sister" also became a top 40 hit in both Canada and the UK. Altogether, tracks by the Warblers have sold over 1.3 million copies.

"Teenage Dream" was performed by Criss and the Warblers on December 5, 2010, for Trevor Live, an annual fundraising event by The Trevor Project, and they were joined by Perry herself mid-song. It was later performed on The Ellen DeGeneres Show on April 22, 2011. Criss has also performed several songs solo: "Teenage Dream" for Rolling Stone and "Silly Love Songs" by Wings on Live with Regis and Kelly. He later stopped by Rolling Stone a second time to perform three other songs from the album. On April 19, 2011, Criss and the Warblers performed "Hey, Soul Sister" and "Raise Your Glass" on Today in promotion of the album. Criss and the Warblers were added to the 2011 concert tour, Glee Live! In Concert!, for both the four-week North American leg starting on May 21, and the ensuing leg in England and Ireland ending July 3.

== Track listing ==
No.	Title	Writer(s)	Original artist	Length
1.	"Teenage Dream"	Lukasz Gottwald, Benjamin Levin, Katy Perry, Bonnie McKee, Max Martin	Katy Perry	3:40
2.	"Hey, Soul Sister"	Amund Bjørklund, Espen Lind, Pat Monahan	Train	3:40
3.	"Bills, Bills, Bills"	Kevin "She'kspere" Briggs, Kandi Burruss, Beyoncé Knowles, LeToya Luckett, Kelly Rowland	Destiny's Child	3:00
4.	"Silly Love Songs"	Linda McCartney, Paul McCartney	Wings	3:50
5.	"When I Get You Alone"	Robin Thicke, Walter Murphy	Robin Thicke	2:32
6.	"Animal"	Tim Pagnotta, Tyler Glenn, Elaine Doty, Chris Allen, Branden Campbell	Neon Trees	3:11
7.	"Misery"	Adam Levine, Jesse Carmichael, Sam Farrar	Maroon 5	3:08
8.	"Blackbird"	John Lennon, Paul McCartney	The Beatles	2:20
9.	"Candles"	Mike Gentile, Sam Hollander, Cassadee Pope, Dave Katz	Hey Monday	2:51
10.	"Raise Your Glass"	Pink, Max Martin, Shellback	Pink	3:18
11.	"Somewhere Only We Know"	Tim Rice-Oxley, Tom Chaplin, Richard Hughes	Keane	3:04
12.	"What Kind of Fool"	Albhy Galuten, Barry Gibb	Barbra Streisand and Barry Gibb	4:08
13.	"Da Ya Think I'm Sexy?"	Carmine Appice, Duane Hitchings, Rod Stewart	Rod Stewart	3:00

Japanese bonus tracks
No.	Title	Writer(s)	Original artist(s)	Length
14.	"I'm Not Gonna Teach Your Boyfriend How to Dance with You"	Reggie Youngblood, Owen Holmes, Kevin Snow, Dawn Watley, Ali Youngblood	Black Kids	3:40

== Personnel ==
Credits adapted from Allmusic.

- Adam Anders – arranger, engineer, producer, soundtrack producer, vocal arrangement, vocals
- Alex Anders – engineer
- Nikki Anders – vocals
- Carmine Appice – composer
- Peer Åström – arranger, engineer, mixing, producer, programming, soundtrack producer
- Shoshana Bean – vocals
- Dave Bett – art direction
- Amund Bjørklund – composer
- PJ Bloom – music supervisor
- Ed Boyer – arranger, engineer, mixing, vocal arrangement
- Kevin "She'kspere" Briggs – composer
- Kandi Burruss – composer
- Geoff Bywater – executive in charge of music
- Sam Cantor – group member
- Jesse Carmichael – composer
- Josh Cheuse – art direction
- Deyder Cintron – assistant engineer
- Chris Colfer – group member
- Darren Criss – group member
- Tim Davis – vocal contractor, vocals
- Dante Di Loreto – soundtrack executive producer
- Brad Falchuk – soundtrack executive producer
- Tommy Faragher – producer, soundtrack producer, vocal arrangement
- Conor Flynn – group member
- Steve Flynn – assistant engineer
- Albhy Galuten – composer
- Mike Gentile – composer
- Lukasz "Dr. Luke" Gottwald – composer
- Michael Grant – group member
- Heather Guibert – coordination
- Duane Hitchings – composer
- Sam Hollander – composer
- Fredrik Jansson – assistant engineer
- Beyoncé Knowles – composer
- Alexander Koutzoukis – engineer
- Charlie Kramsky – assistant engineer
- John Kwon – group member
- Storm Lee – vocals
- John Lennon – composer
- Benjamin Levin – composer
- Adam Levine – composer
- Fernando Lodeiro – assistant engineer
- David Loucks – vocals
- LeToya Luckett – composer
- John Lukason – engineer
- Riker Lynch – group member
- Meaghan Lyons – coordination
- Cailin Mackenzie – group member
- Michael Madden – composer
- Dominick Maita – mastering
- Kent McCann – engineer, group member
- Linda McCartney – composer
- Paul McCartney – composer
- Pat Monahan – composer
- Eric Morrissey – group member
- Ryan Murphy – producer, soundtrack producer
- Jeanette Olsson – vocals
- Tim Rice-Oxley – composer
- Tim Pagnotta – composer
- Katy Perry – composer
- Roni Pillischer – assistant engineer
- Evan Powell – group member
- Nicole Ray – production coordination
- Penn Rosen – group member
- Kelly Rowland – composer
- Johan Schuster – composer
- Eli Seidman – group member
- Onitsha Shaw – vocals
- Jenny Sinclair – coordination
- Bryan Smith – engineer, mixing
- Robert L. Smith – engineer, mixing
- Sally Stevens – vocal contractor
- Rod Stewart – composer
- Robin Thicke – composer
- Jack Thomas – group member
- Miranda Penn Turin – photography
- Windy Wagner – vocals
- Seth Waldmann – engineer, mixing
- Eric Weaver – assistant engineer

Note: the term "group member" refers to the singers of the Tufts Beelzebubs, who voiced the Warblers, plus Darren Criss and Chris Colfer, who sang lead.
