= Beneath It All =

EP by Hey Monday
- Released: August 17, 2010
- Recorded: Spring 2010
- Genre: Pop rock; pop punk; power pop; alternative rock
- Length: 20:57
- Label: Decaydance; Columbia
- Producer: S*A*M & Sluggo; Chris DeStefano; Butch Walker

Hey Monday chronology
Hold On Tight (2008)	Beneath It All (2010)	Candles (2011)

Singles from Beneath It All
- 1. "I Don't Wanna Dance" Released: July 27, 2010

Beneath It All is the first EP by American rock band Hey Monday. The band spent the beginning of 2010 finishing the writing and recording of Beneath It All, which was originally going to be their second full-length studio album. On June 23, Hey Monday announced the album name, track listing, as well as deluxe and standard editions of the album. Between late June and early August, the band performed on Warped Tour.

On July 23, 2010 lead vocalist Cassadee Pope posted on the official website that it would no longer be an album but a 6-song CD EP (and a 7-song EP on iTunes). She also said that a full-length album would follow in early 2011. The lead single "I Don't Wanna Dance" was released on July 27, 2010, and the video, shot on June 24, premiered on MTV July 29. On August 12, 2010, Hey Monday's now-former bassist Jersey Moriarty and Pope tweeted that the album was available for streaming on their MySpace page. Patrick McKenzie did not record the drums for this EP. Instead, Stacy Jones of American Hi-Fi played the drums.

In the United States, the album debuted on the Billboard 200 at #25, selling 14,494 copies in its first week and gave the band its most successful charting. This was the last material released by the band with the original bassist, Jersey Moriarty.

== Track listing ==
No.	Title	Writer(s)	Producer(s)	Length
1.	"Wish You Were Here"	Cassadee Pope; Sam Hollander; Dave Katz; Matt Scannell	S*A*M & Sluggo; Chris DeStefano^{[a]}	3:20
2.	"Wondergirl"	Pope; Hollander; Katz	S*A*M & Sluggo; DeStefano^{[a]}	3:18
3.	"I Don't Wanna Dance"	Pope; Hollander; Katz	S*A*M & Sluggo; DeStefano^{[a]}	4:01
4.	"Hangover"	Pope; Butch Walker	Walker	3:04
5.	"Mr. Pushover"	Pope	S*A*M & Sluggo; DeStefano^{[a]}	3:46
6.	"Where Is My Head"	Pope	S*A*M & Sluggo	3:28

iTunes exclusive
No.	Title	Writer(s)	Producer(s)	Length
7.	"Fall into Me"	Pope	S*A*M & Sluggo	3:47
Total length:				24:02

Notes

- ^{^[a]} signifies a co-producer

== Pre-order packages ==
=== Deluxe edition ===
- Full-length 6-song CD EP
- A limited edition 7" of "Wish You Were Here" and "Mr. Pushover"
- 11" × 17" exclusive poster
- A one-year subscription to Alternative Press magazine
- Instant download of "Wish You Were Here"
- MP3 download of the full EP on August 17
- Hey Monday wristband
- Autographed CD booklet
- "How You Love Me Now" live

=== Standard edition ===
- Full-length 6-song CD EP
- A limited edition 7" of "Wondergirl" and "Mr. Pushover"
- 11" × 17" exclusive poster
- Instant download of "Wish You Were Here"
- MP3 download of the full EP on August 17

=== Digital edition ===
- Instant download of "Wish You Were Here"
- MP3 download of the full EP on August 17

== Reception ==
Professional ratings
Review scores
Source	Rating
Alternative Press	3/5 stars
BLARE Magazine	2.5/5 stars
idobi	2.5/5 stars
Sound in the Signals	2/5 stars
PaynePunkPress	3.5/5 stars

The EP has received mixed reviews from critics and fans, many liking the lyrics but missing the pop punk sound and energy from the first album Hold On Tight. Alternative Press gave it 3 out of 5 stars, commenting "[it] comes off as extremely over-produced, with swooshes, bells and whistles lending themselves better to Kelly Clarkson than Hey Monday" as well as "Beneath It All is enjoyable enough, but it feels woefully incomplete." Blare Magazine stated "Beneath It All consoles you with a striking pop construction but force feeds you images of Kelly Clarkson ("I Don't Wanna Dance") and an edgy Taylor Swift with an innocent butterfly tattoo", giving it 2 1/2 stars out of 5. Idobi.com gave it 2.5/5.0 and stated "This West Palm Beach pop-punk quartet is known for a dynamic live show and showed a lot of promise on its 2008 album, but this is categorically a 'sophomore slump' and it is unfortunate that the overall energy of Beneath It All cannot compare to Hold on Tight."

== Singles ==
"I Don't Wanna Dance" was released as the first single on July 27, 2010. The video premiered the following Thursday on MTV. It was released as the iTunes free single of the week. As of September 3, 2010, it had reached #7 on the "iLike Libraries: Most Added".

=== Music video ===
The music video premiered on July 29, 2010 and was directed by Petro Papahadjopoulos. It starts out with Hey Monday walking up to the stage, and seemingly performing a concert as the lyrics follow the "take me home" intro. Cassadee Pope is dressed in a black, strapless minidress with hot pink leggings. As the verse begins, it goes to the POV of her love interest; it is shot from his point of view. They begin on good terms, having fun at a concert but he soon leaves to flirt with other girls. During the bridge, her friends inform her of this and she mouths in sync with the lyrics, "You'll never take me home". At the end of the video, Pope stands still, glaring at him, while the rest of the females swarm around her and chase him away.

== Chart performance ==
Chart	Peak position
US Billboard 200	25
US Top Digital Albums	11
US Top Rock Albums	9
US Top Alternative Albums	5
US Billboard Tastemaker Albums	5

== Personnel ==
Hey Monday

- Cassadee Pope – lead vocals, acoustic guitar
- Mike Gentile – lead guitar
- Alex Lipshaw – rhythm guitar
- Michael "Jersey" Moriarty – bass, backing vocals

Additional musicians

- Stacy Jones – drums
