= Blaine Anderson =

Fictional character from the Fox series Glee

- Glee character
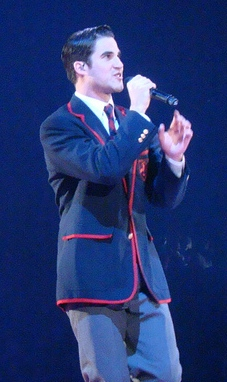
- Darren Criss as Blaine Anderson during Glee Live! In Concert!
- First appearance: "Never Been Kissed" (2010)
- Last appearance: "Dreams Come True" (2015)
- Created by: Ryan Murphy; Brad Falchuk; Ian Brennan
- Portrayed by: Darren Criss

In-universe information
- Occupation: Student; Glee club director; Actor
- Family: Pam Anderson (mother); Cooper Anderson (brother); Unnamed daughter
- Spouse: Kurt Hummel
- Significant other: Dave Karofsky (ex-boyfriend)

Blaine Devon Anderson is a fictional character from the American musical comedy-drama television series Glee. Played by Darren Criss, Blaine was introduced in the sixth episode of the second season as the openly gay lead singer of the Dalton Academy Warblers, a rival show choir to New Directions, the show's primary musical group. Blaine initially served as a mentor for New Directions member Kurt Hummel (Chris Colfer). Chemistry between the two, combined with fan support for the couple, led series co-creator Ryan Murphy to pair them romantically. Their relationship has been well received by critics, and they have been named "the most beloved TV couples of the millennium" by Jarett Wieselman of the New York Post. At the beginning of the third season, Blaine transfers to McKinley High and joins New Directions; concurrently, Criss was promoted from recurring guest star to the show's main cast.

Criss auditioned for Glee several times before being cast as Blaine, including for the lead role of Finn Hudson. He believed he would be ill-suited to that character, but identifies with Blaine, having been raised among the "gay community". He plays Blaine as charismatic and confident, and finds his youthful self-acceptance a fitting counterpoint to common media portrayals of gay characters.

As the Warblers' lead vocalist and subsequent New Directions member, Blaine has performed a number of songs on the television series. His first, a cover version of "Teenage Dream" by Katy Perry, became the fastest-selling Glee single, reached number eight on the Billboard Hot 100, and was certified gold in the U.S. Tracks by the Warblers have sold over 1.3 million copies. The songs became popular enough to warrant a Warbler soundtrack album, Glee: The Music Presents the Warblers. Blaine has received mostly positive reviews from critics; Criss has been awarded a Rising Star accolade from the Gay and Lesbian Entertainment Critics Association for his portrayal. While the Blaine–Kurt ("Klaine") relationship has been met with acclaim, an episode storyline in which Blaine questioned his sexuality attracted negative reviews for undermining his previous characterization as a confident gay teenager.

== Storylines ==
=== Season 2 ===
Blaine Anderson is introduced in the episode "Never Been Kissed" as the lead soloist of the Dalton Academy Warblers a cappella musical group. He meets Kurt Hummel (Chris Colfer), a member of the rival glee club New Directions. When Kurt asks if Blaine is gay, Blaine matter-of-factly says he is; Kurt tells Blaine that he is being bullied at school for being gay, and Blaine reveals that he too was harassed at his old school, so he transferred to Dalton Academy, which enforces a no-bullying policy. Blaine befriends Kurt, and helps him stand up to his tormentor, Dave Karofsky (Max Adler). When the threats and violence against Kurt reach a dangerous level, he transfers to Dalton Academy. He falls in love with Blaine, who is initially oblivious to Kurt's feelings even as their friendship grows. Blaine enlists Kurt's help to serenade his crush Jeremiah (Alexander Nifong), the assistant manager at a local Gap store. Jeremiah is subsequently fired and rebuffs Blaine. Kurt confesses his feelings, and Blaine tells Kurt that he cares for him, but is terrible at romance and does not want to risk damaging their friendship.

Kurt and Blaine attend a party hosted by New Directions co-captain Rachel Berry (Lea Michele). The attendees play spin the bottle, which results in Rachel and Blaine kissing. In the aftermath, Blaine wonders whether he might be bisexual, and goes on a date with Rachel. When she kisses him again while they are both sober, he concludes that he is indeed gay, which relieves Kurt.

After learning of Kurt’s ignorance of sexual matters, Blaine visits Kurt's father, Burt (Mike O'Malley), and prompts him to give Kurt "the talk" about sex. As the Warblers prepare to perform at the Regional show choir competition, Kurt admits that he is jealous of how many solos Blaine gets. At a subsequent group meeting, Kurt arrives late and announces that the group's mascot canary is dead; he sings "Blackbird" in honor of the bird. While Kurt is singing, Blaine has a revelation, and later tells Kurt that he reciprocates his feelings and kisses him. At Regionals, the two sing a duet of "Candles" by Hey Monday. The Warblers lose to New Directions, but while Kurt is very disappointed, Blaine tells him that even though they lost, in reality, they won each other which makes losing Regionals worth it. After Kurt transfers back to McKinley, he asks Blaine to be his date at his junior prom in "Prom Queen"; though Blaine is initially hesitant, remembering how he was bullied at prom at his old school, he agrees. Both are shocked when Kurt wins Prom Queen due to having received an overwhelming number of unwanted write-in votes in the secret balloting. Karofsky, the Prom King, leaves to avoid dancing with a boy in the traditional dance between King and Queen, and Kurt dances with Blaine instead. After Kurt returns from Nationals in New York, he and Blaine admit their love for one another.

=== Season 3 ===
In the first episode of the third season, "The Purple Piano Project", Blaine transfers to McKinley High at the beginning of his junior year to be closer to Kurt, who is a senior, and joins New Directions. He later auditions for the role of Bernardo in the school musical West Side Story, so as not to compete against Kurt who wants to play the male lead, Tony, but is cast as Tony himself. In the episode "The First Time", Blaine is pursued by Sebastian Smythe (Grant Gustin), a new Dalton Academy Warbler. Kurt and Blaine meet up with Sebastian at a gay bar, Blaine gets drunk, and afterward tries to get Kurt to have sex with him in the car. Kurt refuses, they have a fight, and Blaine decides to walk home. After the West Side Story opening night, they apologize to each other, and decide to go to Blaine's house. They are later shown in bed together, apparently having just had sex for the first time. When New Directions and the Warblers informally compete in "Michael" to determine which club can perform Michael Jackson's music at the upcoming show choir Regionals, Sebastian throws a slushie containing rock salt at Kurt, but Blaine interposes himself and is hit in the eye; his cornea is badly scratched and requires surgery. His eye heals, and he is back in time for New Directions to defeat the Warblers at Regionals. Blaine's older brother Cooper (Matt Bomer), a successful actor in commercials, visits Ohio, and the two achieve a rapprochement. Blaine's relationship with Kurt is later strained when Kurt text-flirts with a boy he met while preparing for his NYADA audition, and by Kurt's eagerness to leave for New York after graduation, which would separate the two at least until Blaine graduated the following year. The two patch things up, the glee club wins at Nationals, and the pair is still a couple at the end of the school year, though Blaine is still uneasy about the prolonged physical separation facing them.

=== Season 4 ===
In the first episode of the fourth season, "The New Rachel", Blaine becomes the lead singer of New Directions and successfully prompts Kurt to follow his New York City dreams. In addition, Blaine successfully runs for senior class president with Sam (Chord Overstreet), and the two subsequently develop a friendship. Kurt inadvertently pulls away from Blaine due to his Vogue.com internship; distraught and feeling isolated from his friends, Blaine cheats on Kurt. After confessing to Kurt of his infidelity, Kurt severs all ties. New Directions' Nationals trophy is stolen by Hunter Clarington (Nolan Gerard Funk), the new captain of the Dalton Academy Warblers. When Blaine goes to Dalton Academy to retrieve it, Hunter and Sebastian attempt to seduce Blaine into returning to the Warblers. Blaine becomes conflicted, believing that he does not belong in New Directions. Sam ultimately convinces him that, despite having done a bad thing to Kurt, Blaine is still a good person and an important member of New Directions.

Kurt begins to mend their relationship in "Thanksgiving", just before New Directions loses at Sectionals to the Warblers, and they spend Christmas together in New York City. Though he and Kurt continue to be on good terms, Blaine finds himself developing a crush on his best friend, Sam, which he knows will come to nothing as he knows Sam is not gay; the two of them team up to find evidence that the Warblers cheated at Sectionals, which means New Directions will be competing at Regionals. He ends up going to the Sadie Hawkins dance with Tina Cohen-Chang (Jenna Ushkowitz), who has developed a crush on him, but as friends only. When Kurt comes to Lima for the wedding of glee club director Will (Matthew Morrison) and Emma (Jayma Mays)—which Emma flees—he and Blaine make out beforehand, and sleep together afterward, though they do not resume a permanent relationship.

Blaine had briefly joined the Cheerios when it looked like New Directions would be disbanding after their Sectionals loss, and cheerleading coach Sue (Jane Lynch) blackmails Blaine into rejoining; Blaine and Sam hatch up a plan to bring Sue down from the inside. Blaine eventually confesses to Sam that he has feelings for him, to which Sam assures him that he is somewhat flattered by Blaine's honesty and attraction, and that it would not change the fact that Blaine is still Sam's best friend. Blaine still loves Kurt and asks Burt for his permission to propose to Kurt, but Burt tells him they're too young to marry, and advises him to wait. Blaine remains determined, however, and while shopping for a ring, he meets Jan (Patty Duke), a lesbian jeweler who has been with her partner Liz (Meredith Baxter) for over thirty years. Jan offers to be a mentor to him, and Blaine and Kurt later have dinner with Jan and Liz, where Jan and Liz explain how their relationship evolved over the years and their experience with the growing mainstream acceptance of gay people. New Directions wins at Regionals, and Will and Emma get married immediately afterward, with the glee club, plus some graduates including Kurt, in attendance. Blaine is shown, after the ceremony is over, holding a jewelry box behind his back.

=== Season 5 ===
In the season premiere, "Love Love Love", Blaine and Kurt agree to be boyfriends again. Blaine still wants to marry Kurt, and stages an elaborate and successful marriage proposal at Dalton Academy where he and Kurt first met, accompanied by New Directions, and all their rival show choir groups, including the Warblers. He auditions for NYADA and is accepted. New Directions comes in second at Nationals, and is disbanded by Sue for not being champions. Blaine graduates as class valedictorian, and then moves to New York to be with Kurt. They start off living together, but though they remain engaged, Blaine ultimately moves out because the two of them realize they still need their own space. The relationship between them goes through rocky patches to include: Blaine's insecurity when Kurt becomes popular at school, as well as the time when an influential socialite and NYADA supporter hears Blaine perform, takes an interest in his future career while being thoroughly unimpressed with Kurt. The woman even tries to split them up. In the end, she fails in her efforts and eventually supports them as a couple. Their engagement is strengthened by having weathered these storms, and Blaine moves back in with Kurt.

=== Season 6 ===
Blaine returns to Lima after Kurt ended their engagement, having become so despondent that his schoolwork suffered and he was cut by NYADA. He becomes the coach of the Dalton Academy Warblers, and begins dating Dave Karofsky after a chance encounter at the local gay bar. Kurt, having realized he still loves Blaine and regretting that he ended the engagement, arranges for his NYADA off-campus semester to be in Lima, helping Rachel to coach a reinstated New Directions—Will had left McKinley High to coach Vocal Adrenaline. Unfortunately, by the time he arrives, Blaine and Karofsky are already a couple, and there is further strain between Kurt and Blaine as coaches of rival show choirs. In "The Hurt Locker, Part Two", Sue, who "ships Klaine" and is desperate for Kurt and Blaine to reunite, locks them both in a fake elevator and refuses to let them leave until they kiss. After resisting for a great many hours, Blaine and Kurt share a passionate kiss, but do not reunite afterward. In "Transitioning", Blaine sings a duet with Kurt, "Somebody Loves You", and afterward, kisses Kurt. The following day, Blaine, knowing that he is still in love with Kurt, breaks up with Karofsky; however, Kurt is still seeing an older man, Walter. In "A Wedding", Kurt tells Walter that he is going to Brittany and Santana's wedding with Blaine, not him, and on Walter's advice, returns to Blaine; the two again become a couple. At the wedding, Brittany insists that Kurt and Blaine get married alongside her and Santana. Though skeptical at first, Kurt and Blaine agree and get married, with Burt officiating the joint ceremony. Dalton Academy burns down in "The Rise and Fall of Sue Sylvester", and the Warblers who transfer to McKinley are accepted into New Directions, with Blaine joining Rachel and Kurt as the coaches of the combined glee club. In the series finale, "Dreams Come True", after New Directions wins Nationals, Blaine and Kurt leave for New York, with Blaine attending NYU and Kurt returning to NYADA along with a reinstated Rachel. The episode jumps ahead to 2020, and Blaine and Kurt are shown to be actors and a celebrity married couple; they also visit schools to entertain and talk about acceptance. Rachel, who is married to Jesse, is pregnant with Blaine and Kurt's child.

== Development ==
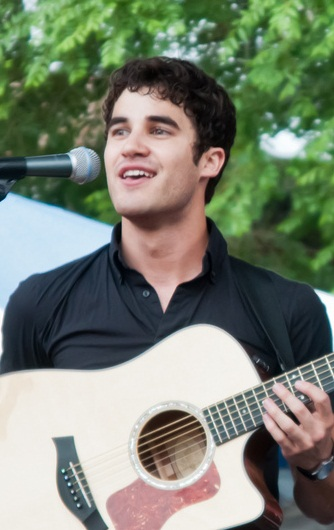
Darren Criss (pictured) auditioned for Glee, set on getting the role of Finn before being cast as Blaine a year later.

=== Casting and creation ===
Blaine is portrayed by actor Darren Criss, who had auditioned for Glee several times for various different roles before the character Blaine was created. He originally auditioned to play Finn Hudson. Criss made several audition videos for Glee, of which he posted only one to the social networking website MySpace where he sang a cover of Bill Withers' song "Lean on Me". Although the series writers have seen them, he considers them supplemental to his main audition, which was for series creator Ryan Murphy. Murphy had not seen any of Criss's previous auditions, but knew he was the right actor for Blaine as soon as he saw this one. The actor cut his long hair before auditioning, to suit the "serious and preppy" role.

Prior to the production of season two, rumors circulated that upcoming episodes would feature a love interest for Kurt. Initial fan and media speculation suggested that Sam Evans (Chord Overstreet) was created to fill this role; however, according to Overstreet, Sam's storyline quickly paired him with Quinn Fabray (Dianna Agron) as a result of the chemistry the producers detected between him and Agron. In September 2010, it was confirmed that Criss would join the show in a "much-talked-about new gay role". Media speculation suggested that Blaine would be Kurt's new love interest. His original character description was: "a cute and charismatic gay student from a rival Glee club named the Dalton Academy Warblers—will maintain a strictly platonic friendship with McKinley High's most out and proud pupil. But could that change as the season progresses? Yes, it could." Murphy stated that Blaine's arc would be a significant one. He explained, "He sort of becomes Kurt's mentor and then maybe love [...] Kurt really admires him and respects him."

Following his first few appearances, it was reported that Criss had been confirmed as a series regular for the remainder of season two and for season three of Glee. This was based on comments by Murphy, who said: "Darren has become such a sensation in one week, which I love. I think there's a hunger for him and a positive relationship role model. He’ll definitely continue through the year and longer." However, the actor later denied that his role had been upgraded and said: "It's never really been officially confirmed to me. I think the option is there and that they want to keep Blaine around." Murphy revealed that Blaine may join New Directions during the third season. Criss hoped that this would not come to pass, as he enjoys being at Dalton Academy, but conceded: "it's not my call. I'm happy to serve whatever story they want." For the third season of Glee, Criss was promoted to a series regular, and Blaine did join New Directions when he transferred to McKinley High to be with Kurt.

=== Characterization ===
"This is the first time I'd really seen an out student that was so young and innocent and really struggling with the big ordeal that it is to be an out student at such an early age. When other shows present the gay character thing, it's typically been in much more adult situations, like gay men living in New York or closeted men who are married and struggling with that ordeal, or having sex on the subway, but never really the core of the journey of defining your sexuality. Blaine offers a beautiful counter to that and makes such a great addition to the many-colored palette that is Glee."

— Criss on Blaine

Upon Blaine's first appearance, Criss described his character as being a "very charismatic, put-together, composed guy." He stated that although Blaine is gay, he is not "overly queeny, and not too butch either," and that while his sexuality is a "huge part of who he is", it is not a major facet of how he wishes to be perceived. Due to similarities which stem from their shared sexuality, Blaine "sees a lot of himself in Kurt, in terms of experiences and the way they feel about the world around them. He feels the need to impart his knowledge, be a source of strength for him, and really help him through what he's going through." Initially, Criss felt that the most important element of his character was to give Kurt "someone he can relate to", and demonstrate that Kurt could have "a young out male friend, a support system".

Criss discussed his personal connection with Blaine in an interview with Vanity Fair. He explained that he grew up among the "gay community", being with theater performers, so was raised without a concept of sexuality being an issue. Criss stated that, although he identifies as straight, "it really doesn't come into play with me in this role. As an actor, your objective is always to play the scene. And this in case, he happens to be a gay teen." Talk show host and media personality Ellen DeGeneres deemed Blaine "a very confident gay teen, which is something you don't see much on television." However, Amy Reiter of the Los Angeles Times assessed that "despite the image he projects, he, too, is just a kid trying to figure things out as he goes along." Criss feels that Blaine's confidence is an important aspect of his character, as it is rare for gay teenagers on television to be so "sure of themselves." He hopes that "all the kids struggling with this issue can look to a guy like Blaine and feel [inspired] by his confidence."

=== Relationships ===
The Kurt–Blaine relationship, sometimes referred to by the portmanteau "Klaine" by Glee fans and the media, developed slowly. As the series showrunner, Murphy felt tasked with keeping the two apart as long as possible. He was initially unsure whether the relationship would become a romantic one, and intended to gauge public response to their friendship before planning future developments. He commented, "Part of me thinks he should be the boyfriend, part of me thinks he should just be the mentor. I didn't want to decide that until we got into sort of the middle of the season." In December 2010, Colfer said, "Fans really want it to happen. It's funny how many people want to see these boys hook up. We'll see." Based on the characters' chemistry and the "immediate outcry" from fans who wanted to see them as a couple, Murphy decided to have Blaine become Kurt's love interest. Criss noted: "We all want to see Kurt happy, and like all great love stories, if you have two people that can be together you've got to hold it up."

Considering Blaine and Kurt's potential future together, Murphy planned to treat them the same as all other Glee relationships, by making their pairing "as flawed and as exposed as everyone else's." This sentiment was re-iterated by executive producer Brad Falchuk, after the characters kissed for the first time. He revealed that their relationship would not run smoothly, and observed that once couples start dating, "Everything goes to hell." Colfer suggested that Kurt returning to McKinley may cause difficulties in their relationship, but noted "Distance makes the heart grow fonder, right? That’s what they tell me. So even if they do go through some bumps in the road, it would be very realistic." In a Q&A with Billboard on the day "Born This Way" ran with Kurt's McKinley return, Criss stated that Blaine and Kurt were "in the honeymoon stages" of their relationship, and would still be "at the end of the [second] season".

In a July 2012 interview with E! News, Colfer said, "I would like to do something besides say 'I love you,' and I think Darren [Criss] and I agree on that. We're ready for the next step. They've been together for a while. Let's throw some spice and drama into that." Colfer quipped that he did not know what was in store for the couple, "I hear mixed things. I hear they're still together but then maybe they're breaking up." In September 2012, Criss seconded Colfer, "We're like an old married couple now. Let's shake it up!"

In the second season episode "Sexy", Blaine reveals he has a strained relationship with his father due to his sexuality.

== Musical performances ==
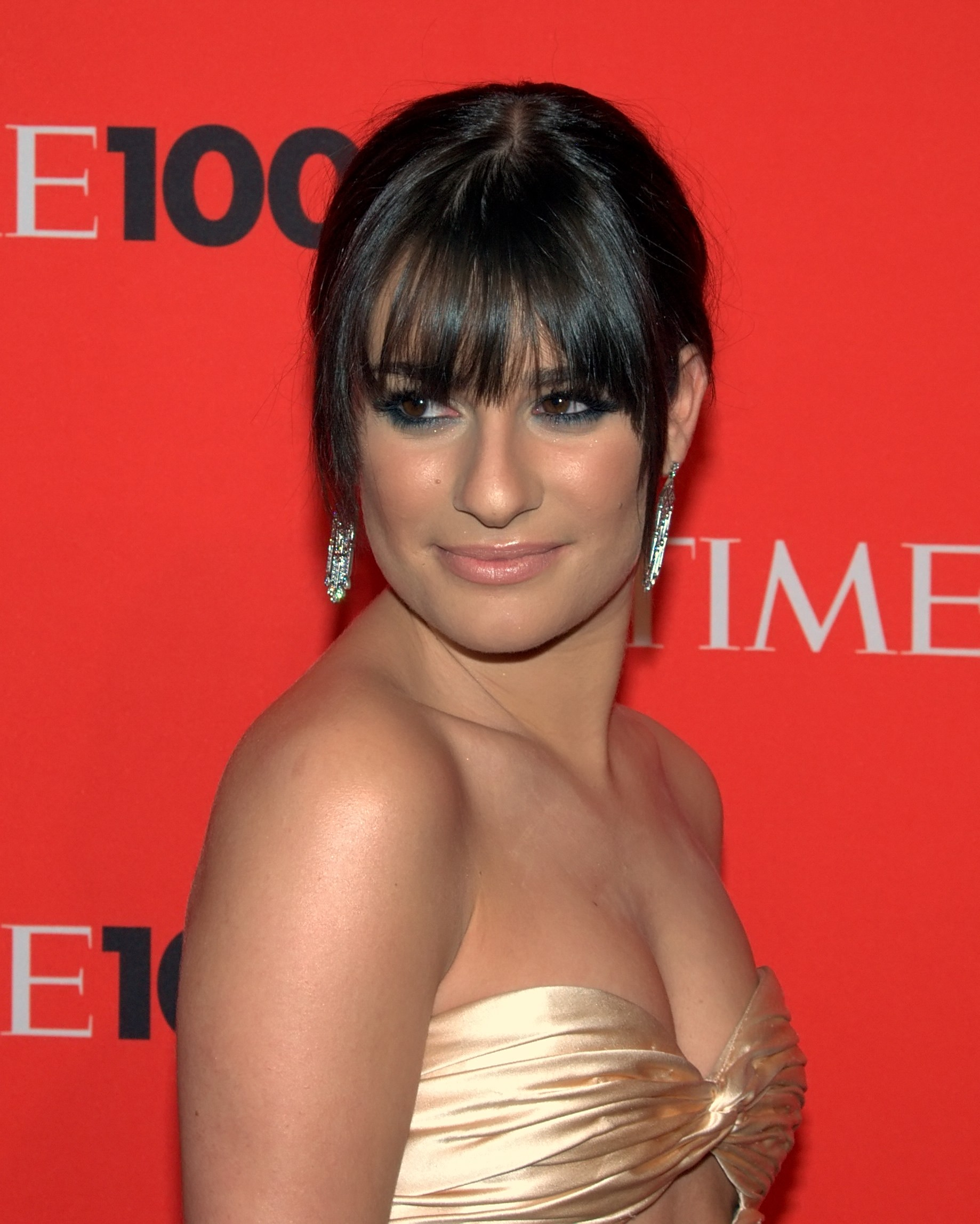
Blaine's duet with Rachel (Michele, pictured) marks his only appearance on Glee: The Music, Volume 5.

As Blaine, Criss features in many musical performances, which have been released as singles, available for download. His first performance, "Teenage Dream" by Katy Perry, was featured on the soundtrack album Glee: The Music, Volume 4. It reached number eight on the Billboard Hot 100 in the week ending November 27, 2010, and was the best-selling song in the U.S. that week, selling 214,000 copies: the largest figure for a Glee title. It was only the second U.S.-certified gold single in the show's history. Both Billboard's Jillian Mapes and Erica Futterman of Rolling Stone deemed "Teenage Dream" the best song of "Never Been Kissed", the episode in which it featured. The Daily News's Anthony Benigno gave the song an "A", and noted that it was "flawless" and improved on Perry's original. The performance was nominated for the Best Gay Moment of the Year and Favorite Music Video awards at the 2010 AfterElton.com Visibility Awards. A Billboard cover-feature on Criss noted that the performance "arguably ushered in the trend of more current pop hits being reworked by the [Glee] cast."

Later songs performed by Blaine and the Warblers became popular enough to warrant a Warbler soundtrack album, Glee: The Music Presents the Warblers. The tracks had sold over 1.3 million copies as singles by the time the album was released. Blaine performed the lead vocal on covers of Train's "Hey, Soul Sister", which peaked at number 32 in Canada, "Bills, Bills, Bills" by Destiny's Child, which reached number 44 in the U.S., and Robin Thicke's "When I Get You Alone", which got to number 47 on the Billboard Hot 100. Criss downplayed his performance of "Bills, Bills, Bills", and jested that he ought to issue the group's lead singer, Beyoncé Knowles, an apology for his cover. Blaine also led on "Silly Love Songs" by Wings, and Maroon 5's "Misery", which reached 45 and 52 respectively in the U.S., and Pink's "Raise Your Glass", which peaked at number 30 in Australia.

Blaine duetted with Kurt on Frank Loesser's "Baby, It's Cold Outside", which was included on Glee: The Music, The Christmas Album and reached number 53 in Canada. It was reportedly the most downloaded track of the album, and called "by far the gayest thing that has ever been on TV" by Colfer. Murphy expressed his pride in the number for "push[ing] the envelope a bit." Jessica Ronayne of Zap2it called the duet one of the Christmas episode's few saving graces. Blaine and Kurt also duetted on Neon Trees' "Animal" and Hey Monday's "Candles", which peaked at 62 and 71 in the U.S. respectively. In an April 2011 interview, Criss stated that he did not feel established enough within the cast to make song suggestions, but had mentioned liking "Animal" to Murphy, who included it in a script soon thereafter. Blaine shared a duet of "Don't You Want Me" by The Human League with Rachel, which Reiter deemed a musical highlight of the episode "Blame It on the Alcohol". It was included on Glee: The Music, Volume 5, and peaked at number 44 in Australia.

Over the course of the season, Blaine's musical performances leading the Warblers became so prevalent that he was called out for it on-screen. Criss offered the insight: "Blaine definitely had his moment in the sun. I think it's time to focus back on the characters that fans of the show really know and love. Completely objectively from watching the show, I was like, 'Why does Blaine get all these songs? This is ridiculous. I want to hear other people doing stuff.' I think we're focusing a little more back on New Directions and taking a little bit of a break from the Warblers."

In the first episode of season three of Glee, "The Purple Piano Project", Blaine sings "It's Not Unusual" by Tom Jones when he transfers to McKinley and quits the Warblers for New Directions. After successfully auditioning later in the season for the school's production of West Side Story with "Something's Coming" from the musical, he sings "Tonight" in rehearsal and "One Hand, One Heart" in performance, both with his co-star Rachel. He sings lead or co-lead on several songs with New Directions, including "Last Friday Night (T.G.I.F.)"; "Perfect" and "Let It Snow! Let It Snow! Let It Snow!" with Kurt; "Control" and "Man in the Mirror" with Artie and others; and his first original song, the duet "Extraordinary Merry Christmas", with Rachel.

In special tribute episode to Michael Jackson, "Michael", Blaine sings "Wanna Be Startin' Somethin'". Futterman wrote that Blaine's "slick showmanship" made him a "natural for lead vocals", and TVLine's Michael Slezak called it "the best use of Darren Criss' voice on Glee in quite some time" and gave it an "A−". Entertainment Weekly's Joseph Brannigan Lynch also gave it an "A−", and said Criss "captured the excitement and the spunky bravado of the original". MTV's Kevin P. Sullivan was another fan of "the sheer awesomeness of Darren Criss" on the song, and characterized it as "a tribute that's more respectful than any other in the episode". In the fourteenth episode of the third season, "On My Way", Blaine performs "Cough Syrup" by Young the Giant, which is sung during the Dave Karofsky suicide sequence. Futterman said Blaine "flawlessly deliver[ed] the vocal". Lynch called it a "chilling rendition" that was "hard to shake" and gave it an "A−", the same grade given by Slezak, who wrote, "taken on its own, Blaine's vocal was strong and passionate—perhaps better than the original". Bobby Hankinson of the Houston Chronicle said it was the "best" of the episode, and added that the "scene was really, really well done and carried maximum emotional punch". In the following episode, "Big Brother", Blaine shares a duet of Gotye's "Somebody That I Used to Know" with his brother Cooper (Matt Bomer). Crystal Bell of HuffPost called it the "highlight of the episode", and it was Hankinson's favorite performance: "Bomer and Criss did a fantastic job bringing it to life". Futterman said that "it was initially disconcerting to envision" two brothers singing about a "former love", but she noted that it "was less weird in context". In its first week, the cover sold 152,000 digital downloads in the US, and was number twenty-six on the Billboard Hot 100.

== Reception ==
Blaine has received mostly positive reviews from television critics. Ellen DeGeneres praised Criss's portrayal, and described him as one of Glee's breakout stars. Entertainment Weekly named him one of the breakout stars of 2010, with the comment: "It took about 2 minutes and 11 seconds on Glee for Darren Criss to turn into a bona fide Gleek phenomenon. [...] And it doesn't hurt that his character Blaine's warm relationship with the show's other openly gay character, Chris Colfer's Kurt, continues to resonate with fans." In November 2010, the publication also named Criss the series' best guest-star to date, and praised him for "seamlessly entering the fold with his charm and great voice." Ronayne deemed him "a much better addition to the show than Chord Overstreet". Following his Glee debut, Criss won the We're Wilde About You Rising Star Award at the 2011 Dorian Awards, presented by the Gay and Lesbian Entertainment Critics Association. He also won the 2011 Teen Choice Award for Choice TV Breakout Star.

Indecision over his sexuality in the episode "Blame It on the Alcohol" drew some negative reviews of Blaine. Reiter noted that, "So much of Blaine's charm has been his certainty about who he is." Though she found his subplot with Rachel "fun", she commented: "Blaine's overwrought speech in the coffee shop after Rachel asks him out just felt off-key. Saying 'bye' to the Blaine sexual-confusion storyline wouldn't make us angry at all." Emily VanDerWerff of The A.V. Club also criticised the storyline, which, she wrote, "seemed like it might be an interesting, complicated look at teenage sexuality and how it can seem formed but might be more fluid than most teens would give it credit for, then lost its nerve and took the easy way out." AfterElton.com's Chris O'Guinn felt that the only aspect of the storyline handled acceptably was Blaine questioning whether he was bisexual, rather than outright straight. He criticized the shallow examination of his feelings, and wrote: "Bisexuality is such a contentious issue that it should not be fumbled this way. For a character to say 'maybe I'm bi' in one scene and then the next say, 'nope, definitely gay' is almost cruel in how dismissive it is toward bisexuals by trivializing the intense confusion that many bisexual people feel in coming to terms with their orientation." In a more positive review, Canning opined that Blaine and Kurt's conversation about sexuality was "great". He was "glad it wasn't an easy talk for either of them" and said that it "felt very real for kids in this situation."

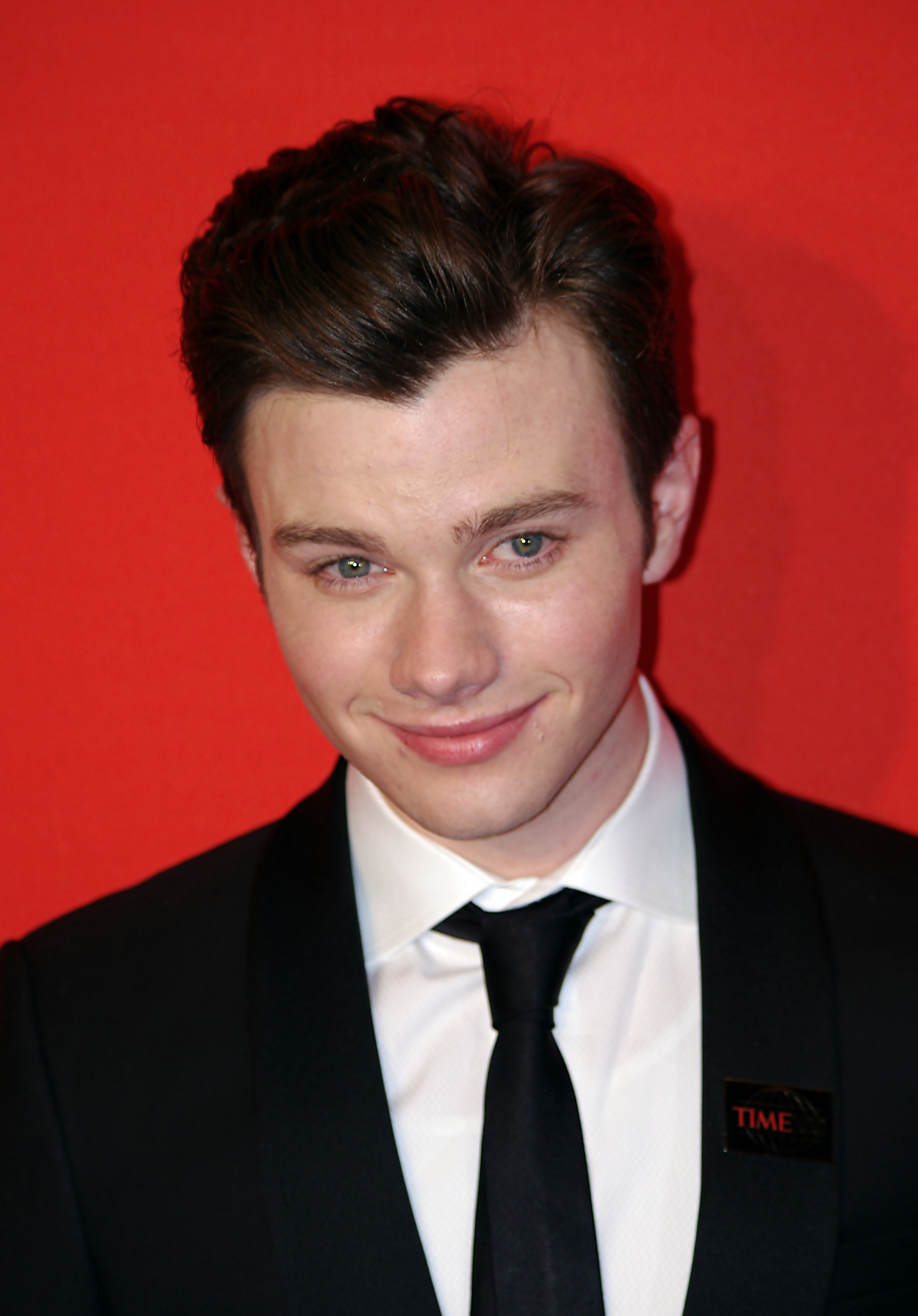
The relationship between Blaine and Kurt (Colfer, pictured) has been generally well received by critics.

Blaine and Kurt's relationship has been generally well received. They were named Favorite TV Couple at the 2010 AfterElton.com Visibility Awards, and have been lauded for "leading the way" in representing gay teenagers on television by Entertainment Weekly. Jarett Wieselman of the New York Post referred to them as "one of the most beloved TV couples of the millennium". When they "finally solidified what their relationship actually is" in the episode "Silly Love Songs", IGN's Robert Canning noted that his opinion of Blaine improved. He commented: "I love that the [serenading of Jeremiah] blew up in Blaine's face. The character has always come off to me as annoyingly arrogant, but "Silly Love Songs" humanized the guy. Guess I may have to like him now." Their first kiss, in the episode "Original Song", was met with critical acclaim. Mark Perigard of The Boston Herald wrote, "It was utterly, sweetly romantic, and Criss sold the hell out of the moment. It's long overdue and it will silence the growing legion of critics out there who were unhappy with the pace of this story." Entertainment Weekly's Mandi Bierly was so impressed with the scene that she was initially concerned it may be a dream sequence, "because we don't get romantic, unapologetic first kisses like that between young gay characters on network TV." She wrote, "Relationships aren't easy. They’ll make mistakes. But if they stay true to themselves, and continue to be as open and honest with each other, we're in for something special." Kevin Fallon of The Atlantic thought the kiss was "sweet", and stated that he was pleased that it attracted no controversy whatsoever. Aly Semigran of MTV praised the interaction between Blaine and Kurt. She called the kiss scene a "sweet, real and, shockingly, un-hyped moment", and praised Criss and Colfer for "handl[ing] it with dignity and honesty".

While Lesley Goldberg of The Hollywood Reporter was pleased Blaine's season three transfer to McKinley in the first episode increased Criss' screen time with Colfer and the New Directions cast, she stated that the move "screams of co-dependency." In contrast, Entertainment Weekly's Abby West found it romantic, and noted: "Blaine and Kurt, with their budding love and witty, pseudo-urbane ways, are my favorite couple to watch. ... I look forward to hearing [Blaine] sing more, watching him bump up against the insular Glee clubbers, and seeing him show off his non-uniform attire". Several reviewers were unhappy with the second episode's revelation that Blaine was a junior, not a senior like Kurt, as had been implied in the previous season. VanDerWerff wrote that Blaine "seems to have simultaneously gotten younger and had a complete personality transplant over the summer", Billboard's Rae Votta noted "the continuity-bending plot point that he's somehow a Junior and not a Senior like his boyfriend", and Samantha Urban of The Dallas Morning News allowed her exasperation to show: "Oh really, Glee? Blaine's a junior? Blaine's younger than Kurt? Fine. FINE."

Kurt and Blaine make the decision to have sex for the first time in "The First Time" episode; many critics were enthusiastic about the fact that a gay couple was being given such a storyline. Canning said that Kurt and Blaine's "attempts to get a little wild", and "trying to grow up faster than they should", were "the better parts of the episode as they felt the most realistic". Futterman praised their departure from the bar as a "very faithful and honest scene". VanDerWerff and BuddyTV contributor John Kubicek both had issues with Blaine's characterization. The latter asserted that he "just behaves however the writers need him to behave in order for the scene to work", while the former said that Blaine's season three storyline "hasn’t been bad by any means, but it does feel like Darren Criss is playing someone who’s quite a bit different from the guy he was playing last season". Bell was impressed by the way the characters' relationship "inspires gay youth in a way that we haven't seen on network television yet" and called them "amazing role models for all teens", and The Atlantic writer Kevin Fallon said it was "remarkable" and a "milestone" that "the decision by gay teen characters to lose their virginities is given equal weight to that of a straight couple".

Discussing public response to his character, Criss stated that he particularly enjoyed comments from "people from parts of the world who are maybe not as exposed to certain ideologies", but had reconsidered their stance on relationships and human rights as a result of the Blaine–Kurt storyline. He called this response "phenomenal", and said: "I was a straight kid growing up in a very gay community and it's something that I've had to watch so many friends have to struggle with and have no place to go to identify in kind of a grander media culture. To be a small piece of that machine is incredibly wonderful."
