= Kurt Hummel =

Fictional character from the Fox series Glee

- Glee character
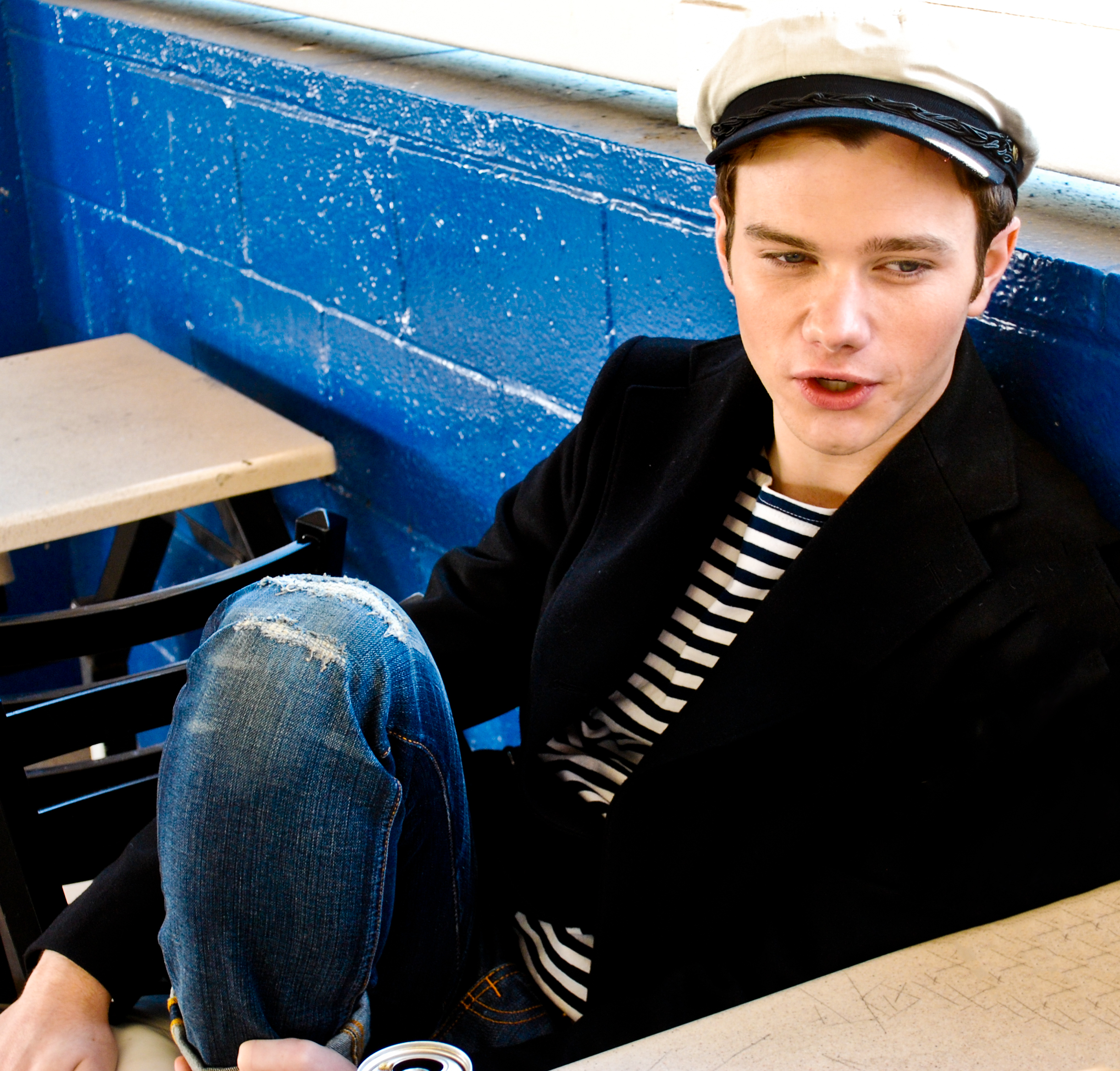
- Chris Colfer as Kurt Hummel in a public appearance at Venice High School
- First appearance: "Pilot" (2009)
- Last appearance: "Dreams Come True" (2015)
- Created by: Ryan Murphy; Brad Falchuk; Ian Brennan
- Portrayed by: Chris Colfer

In-universe information
- Full name: Kurt Elizabeth Hummel
- Occupation: High school and college student (graduated); Intern at Vogue.com; Broadway actor
- Family: Burt Hummel (father); Unnamed mother (deceased); Unnamed daughter Carole Hudson (stepmother); Finn Hudson (stepbrother, deceased)
- Spouse: Blaine Anderson
- Relatives: Mildred (aunt)

Kurt Elizabeth Hummel is a fictional character from the Fox musical comedy-drama series Glee. Series creators Ryan Murphy, Brad Falchuk and Ian Brennan initially conceived of him as a fashionable gay countertenor who is routinely bullied at school. Kurt is portrayed by actor Chris Colfer, and has appeared as a character on the show since its pilot episode, first broadcast on May 19, 2009. Glee follows the trials of the New Directions glee club at the fictional William McKinley High School in the town of Lima, Ohio, of which Kurt is a member. His storylines in the first season focus on his struggle with his sexuality as he comes out to his father and friends, and deals with his romantic feelings for Finn Hudson, the straight co-captain of the glee club.

In the show's second season, Kurt is forced to transfer to a private school for his own safety after a closeted gay classmate bullies him relentlessly and then threatens to kill him. Kurt joins the Dalton Academy Warblers, the school's glee club, which is a competition rival of New Directions, and is befriended by their openly gay lead singer Blaine Anderson. Later on, the two become romantically involved. Their relationship has been well received by critics, and they have been named "one of the most beloved TV couples of the millennium" by Jarett Wieselman of the New York Post. Kurt eventually transfers back to McKinley and rejoins New Directions, but continues his relationship with Blaine, who transfers to McKinley in the third season. In the fourth season, Kurt moves to New York City with his best friend Rachel Berry, where he pursues his musical education while interning for Vogue.com. For the remainder of the series, Glee charts Kurt's life in Lima and New York as he grapples with young adulthood and realizing his career ambitions.

Colfer describes Kurt as projecting a very confident "I'm better than you" personality, despite being a typically scared and anxious teenager. Kurt's solos for New Directions tend to be songs—usually show tunes—traditionally performed by women, which best suit his countertenor voice. His occasionally complex—but always loving—relationship with his father has been a focus for the show. Colfer's portrayal of Kurt has received much critical praise, and he has been the recipient of several awards, including Best Supporting Actor in a Series, Miniseries or Television Film at the 2011 Golden Globe Awards. He has also garnered many award nominations, which include the 2010 and 2011 Emmy Awards for Outstanding Supporting Actor in a Comedy Series.

== Casting and creation ==
Prior to being cast in Glee, Colfer had no professional acting experience. He originally auditioned for the role of Artie Abrams, performing "Mr. Cellophane" from the musical Chicago. Murphy was so impressed by his performance that the role of Kurt was created for him. To keep the number of students in the glee club constant, a character named Rajish was cut from the show. Kurt's name is inspired by the character Kurt von Trapp from The Sound of Music, a role that Colfer once played as a child. The Hummel surname comes from the popular German Hummel figurines; Colfer explained in an interview that Murphy thought he had their rosy-cheeked complexion. Murphy praised Colfer's abilities despite his lack of formal training, saying, "I just thought he was so talented and gifted and unusual. I've never seen anyone who looks like him or acts like him or sounds like him. You'd think he'd been at Juilliard for six years but he hasn't." Murphy saw something of himself in the young actor, a fact that Colfer says is "completely mind-blowing". Colfer added, "For him to see me in him, I can't even describe it."

After being cast, Colfer said that he was happy "to be a part of something that is so new and different and so needed at this time", and added, "It's good to have something positive, especially for kids in small towns, like myself, who need a little pick-me-up." Kurt has twice been portrayed as a child: in the episode "Grilled Cheesus", a series of flashback scenes show Kurt at the age of eight, in which the character is played by Adam Kolkin. Although Kolkin was thirteen at the time of the audition, which called for an eight-year-old, he was chosen in part because his resemblance to Colfer was "so uncanny even the casting directors were taken aback". Kurt has also been shown even younger—in the episode "The Substitute", club director Will Schuester (Matthew Morrison) comes down with the flu and has a hallucination of the students as preschoolers; all twelve glee club members, including Kurt, are played by very young children.

In December 2010, Murphy announced that the cast of Glee would be replaced at the end of the third season to coincide with their graduation. He said, "Every year we're going to populate a new group. There's nothing more depressing than a high schooler with a bald spot." He also revealed that some of the original cast would leave as early as 2012: "I think you have to be true to the fact that here is a group of people who come and go in these teachers' lives." Murphy stated in July 2011 that Colfer would be one of the actors leaving at the end of the third season, and Colfer commented on the report, saying, "We had kind of known since the beginning, since we started the show, that these characters were going to grow up and they were going to graduate eventually. I don't think I thought it was going to happen so soon, necessarily, but I think we knew something like this was coming." However, Falchuk later said that while Colfer, along with Lea Michele and Cory Monteith, would graduate at the end of the third season, their graduation did not mean that they would leave the show. Falchuk insisted that "it was never our plan or our intention to let them go.... They are not done with the show after this season."

== Storylines ==
=== Season 1 ===
In the show's pilot episode, Kurt auditions for the New Directions glee club by performing "Mr. Cellophane" from Chicago. Although he initially hides his homosexuality, many of the other members assume he is gay. He confides that he is gay to fellow glee club member Mercedes (Amber Riley) in "Acafellas", and the two develop a close friendship. In the following episode, "Preggers", Kurt joins the school football team as a kicker in order to impress his widowed father, Burt Hummel (Mike O'Malley), and helps the failing team win its first game by kicking the tie-breaking extra point. His heightened confidence leads him to disclose his sexuality to his father, who not only responds with love and acceptance, but also surprises Kurt by telling him that he has long been aware that Kurt was gay. Kurt quits the football team in "Mash-Up", when Coach Ken Tanaka (Patrick Gallagher) forces the glee club members of the team to choose between the club and the team.

Kurt competes against the glee club's star singer Rachel Berry (Lea Michele) for a solo on "Defying Gravity" from the musical Wicked. However, after Burt receives a phone call labeling his son "a fag", Kurt intentionally misses the song's high note in order to lose the competition and save his father from further harassment. In the episode "Ballad", Kurt is teamed with club member and quarterback Finn Hudson (Cory Monteith), for whom he harbors romantic feelings. He is aware that Rachel is also attracted to Finn, and attempts to sabotage her chances with him by giving her a bad makeover. In "The Power of Madonna", Kurt and Mercedes, dissatisfied with their limited solo opportunities within the glee club, become singers for the school's cheerleading squad, the Cheerios. Although Mercedes soon resigns from the squad, Kurt stays through the National cheerleading competition, and performs a major solo in the routine that wins the Cheerios their sixth consecutive national championship.

Kurt introduces his father to Finn's mother Carole (Romy Rosemont) in the hope that if the two began dating, it would bring Kurt closer to Finn. Finn is initially unhappy when he finds out his mother is in a serious relationship, but he soon bonds with Burt over sports and other traditionally masculine activities. Kurt, who becomes jealous over their growing relationship, briefly attempts to reclaim his father's attention by acting more masculine: he imitates Burt's style of dress, asks him for advice on performing songs by his favorite artist, John Mellencamp, and arranges to have Burt walk in on him kissing cheerleader and glee club member Brittany Pierce (Heather Morris). In the episode "Theatricality", Burt invites Carole and Finn to move in with him and Kurt. Aware of Kurt's attraction to him, Finn is uncomfortable with sharing a bedroom with Kurt. In the hopes of pleasing Finn, Kurt redecorates their bedroom, but Finn is appalled by its fancy appearance and lack of privacy. During the ensuing argument, when Kurt refuses to acknowledge his infatuation, Finn loses his temper and calls the new furnishings "faggy". Burt overhears Finn's words, angrily berates Finn, and throws him out. However, at the end of the episode, when two bullies are about to attack Kurt, Finn redeems himself by defending him.

=== Season 2 ===
Burt suffers a heart attack early in the second season. He is comatose for several days, and Kurt is terrified that he might lose him. When members of the glee club sing religious songs to comfort him, Kurt, who does not believe in God, feels alienated, and lashes out at them. Burt eventually regains consciousness, and Kurt takes charge of his recovery. In the episode "Duets", Kurt suspects new glee club member and transfer student Sam Evans (Chord Overstreet) is gay and recruits Sam to be his teammate in the club's duets competition. Finn attempts to dissuade Kurt from partnering with Sam by predicting that Sam will be bullied to the point of quitting the club if he sings a duet with another male student. After Burt points out that Kurt may be taking advantage of Sam, Kurt terminates the partnership, and performs a "duet" with himself, singing "Le Jazz Hot!" from Victor/Victoria. With unusual empathy, Rachel notices how lonely and unhappy Kurt seems, and realizes how hard it is for him to be the only publicly gay student at school. She reminds Kurt that the club members value him highly and that he is not alone, and asks him to sing the Judy Garland / Barbra Streisand duet of "Get Happy" and "Happy Days Are Here Again" with her.

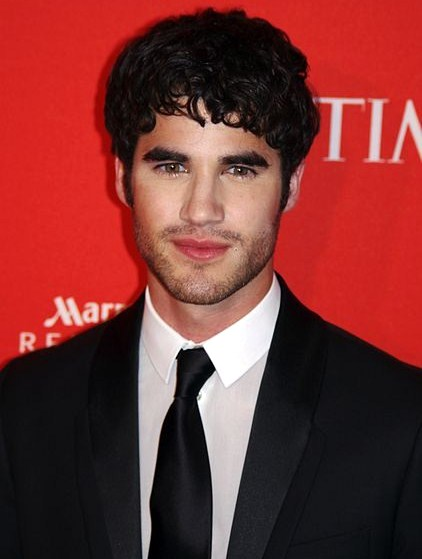
The storyline pairing Kurt and Blaine Anderson (Darren Criss, pictured) ran for most of the second season.

In "Never Been Kissed", Kurt goes to spy on the Dalton Academy glee club, the Warblers—New Directions' primary competition for Sectionals—and meets openly gay student Blaine Anderson (Darren Criss), who then flirts with him while singing lead in a Warblers performance of "Teenage Dream". Kurt tells Blaine that he is being tormented by a homophobic bully at his high school, and Blaine convinces him to stand up for himself. When the bully, Dave Karofsky, throws Kurt against a locker, Kurt confronts him, and an increasingly agitated Karofsky abruptly grabs Kurt and kisses him. Before Karofsky can initiate a second kiss, Kurt shoves him away. Kurt and Blaine try to talk to Karofsky about being gay and closeted, but he denies the kiss. The bullying intensifies, and Karofsky threatens to kill Kurt if Kurt reveals their kiss to anyone. After Burt learns about Karofsky's threat to his son, Karofsky is expelled. Burt and Carole get married, but when Karofsky's expulsion is reversed by the school board, the newlyweds decide to spend the money they had saved for their honeymoon on tuition to transfer Kurt to Dalton Academy, which enforces a zero-tolerance policy against bullying.

At Dalton, Kurt joins the Warblers. When the Warblers and New Directions meet at the show choir Sectionals competition, they tie for first place, making both groups eligible for Regionals. Kurt and Blaine become good friends, and Kurt soon falls in love with Blaine, though Blaine is initially oblivious to Kurt's regard. However, in the episode "Original Song", Blaine realizes his true feelings for Kurt, and they share a kiss. To Kurt's disappointment, the Warblers lose to New Directions at the Regionals competition. He transfers back to McKinley in "Born This Way" after Karofsky starts an anti-bullying club with glee club member Santana Lopez (Naya Rivera), and personally assures Kurt that he regrets his earlier threats.

Kurt invites Blaine to the McKinley junior prom in "Prom Queen". The attendees greet Karofsky's election as Prom King with great enthusiasm, but a stunned silence falls when Kurt is declared Prom Queen due to having received an overwhelming number of unwanted write-in votes in the secret balloting. Humiliated, Kurt flees in tears, but is able to calm down and return for his coronation; his comment—"Eat your heart out, Kate Middleton"—garners applause that swells into an ovation. The traditional dance between King and Queen is next, and Karofsky is faced with having to partner with a boy in front of his classmates. He rejects Kurt's suggestion to come out at the prom, and abandons Kurt on the dance floor as the music begins; Blaine dances with Kurt instead. At the end of the season, the glee club travels to the Nationals competition in New York City. Kurt and Rachel sneak into the Gershwin Theatre where Wicked is playing, and from the stage they sing "For Good", a song from the musical. They both decide to come back to New York after graduation. New Directions finishes in twelfth place at Nationals, and upon Kurt's return to Ohio, he and Blaine declare their love for one another.

=== Season 3 ===
Blaine gives in to Kurt's urgings and wishes and transfers to McKinley High so they can spend more time together during Kurt's senior year. Kurt and Rachel decide they want to apply to a top school for the dramatic arts in New York City, NYADA, but are intimidated when they meet some of their competition and decide their applications need to include more accomplishments: Rachel proposes that McKinley do West Side Story as the school musical so she can star in it, and Kurt runs for class president. Brittany volunteers to be his campaign manager, and he accepts, but when he objects to her suggestions for posters and paraphernalia as overemphasizing his sexuality, she decides to run for the office herself. Kurt tries out for the musical, but the directors aren't convinced that he's masculine enough to portray Tony, the romantic male lead, and cast Blaine instead, even though he's only a junior. Kurt is given the minor role of Officer Krupke, but congratulates Blaine on getting the part. When Rachel believes that she might not be cast as Maria, the female lead, she panics and decides to run for class president as well, infuriating Kurt. She eventually withdraws and throws her support behind Kurt, and secretly decides to help him further by stuffing the ballot box in his favor. He nevertheless loses to Brittany, and Rachel is suspended from school for cheating. The same day that Kurt loses, his father wins a special congressional election against Sue.

In "The First Time", Kurt and Blaine discuss whether or not to have sex. When Blaine goes to Dalton to invite the Warblers to see him in West Side Story, he is pursued by a new warbler Sebastian Smythe (Grant Gustin). Sebastian convinces Kurt and Blaine to go with him to a local gay bar—he supplies the fake IDs—and spends half the night dancing with Blaine. When they leave, a drunk and aroused Blaine urges Kurt to have sex with him in the back seat of the car. Kurt refuses, and Blaine walks home. He later tells Kurt that he was just nervous about the possibility of their first time, and that he cares nothing for Sebastian. They kiss onstage in the empty auditorium, and Kurt proposes that they go over to Blaine's house for the night, where they have sex together for the first time. In the episode "Michael", New Directions and the Warblers compete for the right to perform Michael Jackson's music at Regionals by singing his song "Bad". Sebastian, who has been unsuccessful in his attempts to steal Blaine from Kurt, throws a slushie laced with rock salt at Kurt, but Blaine jumps in front of Kurt and is badly injured by it; the cornea in his right eye is deeply scratched and requires surgery. Neither group ultimately uses Jackson's music at Regionals, and New Directions wins the competition. Later, Kurt succeeds in becoming a finalist for NYADA, as does Rachel.

In "Dance with Somebody", Kurt feels that Blaine has been distant, and confides in a boy named Chandler he meets at the local music store. The two hit it off instantly with their common interest of moving to New York after high school. Kurt begins texting Chandler quite often soon after that. Rachel thinks he's being in the wrong that Kurt is cheating on Blaine instead of talking to Blaine about the rut they are in. Blaine finds out about Chandler and is extremely hurt. Both Kurt and Blaine sing Whitney songs to express how they feel about their situation with Blaine singing "It's Not Right but It's Okay" and Kurt singing "I Have Nothing" as an apology. Eventually after having a talk in Emma's office, the two make up and are stronger than ever. In "Goodbye", Blaine is worried that he and Kurt will not make it as a couple after Kurt graduates and moves off to New York. Kurt reassures him that they will be okay as a couple. After graduation, Kurt, Rachel and Finn's letters from the New York schools they applied to come in. Kurt does not get accepted to NYADA.

=== Season 4 ===
In Season 4, Kurt joins Rachel in New York after she reveals that she is unhappy with her roommate and life at that point. After the encouragement of Blaine and his father, he decides to sell his car and fly to New York, where he finds a loft in Bushwick for him and Rachel to move into. Kurt applies for a job at Vogue.com and his editor, Isabelle Wright, who is also from Ohio, hires him partially based upon his portfolio of outfits and is impressed with his intuition and style. Early on, she leans on his support, and then quickly returns his support when he decides to give Rachel a makeover in the Vogue closet. Instead of being angry, she loves his idea to do a musical makeover for the website and joins in the makeover. Kurt becomes increasingly busy with his job at Vogue, and Blaine cheats on him in Lima. He comes to New York to tell Kurt what happened, and they break up.

Kurt continues working at Vogue throughout the season, and Isabelle encourages him to try to forgive Blaine, and at Thanksgiving, she brings her friends over to their loft and throws him a "kiki." When Kurt reauditions for NYADA, he is initially rejected, because Carmen Tibideaux sees his technical skill and tells him that he can sell a number, but doesn't believe that he is emotional enough to be an artist. Later, when Kurt is at the Winter Showcase to support Rachel, she sees him moved by Rachel's piece, and announces that he will be auditioning after the intermission. Though he initially panics, Rachel convinces him that he doesn't need his bells and whistles to perform, and he chooses to sing "Being Alive" from Company, which impresses the NYADA audience, and he later gets a letter telling him that he has gotten in.

At Christmas, Kurt elects not to go back home, and so his father comes up to New York to set up his Christmas tree and spend some time with him. At this point, he tells Kurt that he has prostate cancer. He also has brought Blaine with him, who tries to win back Kurt's trust, but the trip is uneasy. When Kurt begins at NYADA, he struggles initially to find his place, and meets a student named Adam Crawford, a senior who wants to recruit him for his own show choir, Adam's Apples, and also seems interested in Kurt himself; Kurt eventually asks him out for coffee. While at Will and Emma's wedding, Kurt and Blaine hook up, leaving their relationship in a question, since Kurt is dating Adam, but not exclusive. When Kurt returns to New York, there is a snowstorm, leaving Kurt, Rachel, Santana, and Adam stuck together in the loft watching movies together. Santana strongly hints about Kurt's hook up with Blaine, and after they are back at school, Adam asks Kurt about his feelings for Blaine. Kurt says that he is desperately trying to get over Blaine, and Adam invites him to find their own romantic movie.

When Santana moves in with him and Rachel, Kurt tries to keep Santana from telling Rachel about Brody prostituting himself. But Santana tells Rachel anyway, much to Kurt's dismay. Later, Kurt and Rachel confront Santana for working at a club dancing and try to encourage her to take a dance class from the extension school of NYADA to keep her skills honed. Still working at Vogue, Kurt is put in charge of a ballet gala, and invites Rachel and Santana to help. He and Rachel reveal that they both had experiences with ballet as children, and Kurt started ballet at the age of three years when his mother decided to take him. He bribes Santana to go with a designer dress, and once they are at the gala, she admits she was in ballet as a child too and loved it. When Kurt returns to Lima, it is to be there for his father's doctor's visit, and his anxiety is apparent throughout his interactions with his friends. However, in the doctor's office, Kurt, Burt, and Carole learn that Burt's cancer has gone into remission, and Kurt takes his father to the Glee club to sing "Sunshine of My Life" to him, which Kurt says Burt used to sing to him when he was little.

=== Season 5 ===
In the season premiere, "Love, Love, Love", Kurt, who is still in Lima, agrees to get back together with Blaine. Emboldened, Blaine decides to ask Kurt to marry him, which he does in an extravagant proposal at Dalton Academy, in the spot where the two met. Kurt accepts. He is back in New York in "Tina in the Sky with Diamonds", and gets a job at the diner where Rachel and Santana are working. He then returns to Lima in "The Quarterback" for his stepbrother Finn's funeral and subsequent memorial, and he grieves with his parents and friends.

=== Season 6 ===
At the start of the season, Kurt who has broken up with Blaine, returns to Lima because he still loves Blaine. When he returns, he meets up with Blaine and says that he wants them to get back together. Blaine replies that he is dating Dave Karofsky. Kurt starts dating an older man, Walter, who he met online. Sue Sylvester, who ships “Klaine”, locks them in an elevator and doesn't let them out until they kiss. After a few hours pass, they share a passionate kiss and agree that it doesn't mean anything.

At Rachel's party, they sing a duet and afterwards Blaine kisses him. Blaine still loves Kurt so he breaks up with Dave. Blaine went to confess his love for Kurt but because Kurt is dating Walter he scraps the idea. Before Brittany's and Santana's wedding Kurt tells Blaine that he still loves him and wants them to get back together. Blaine says the same thing and they kiss. They go to the wedding as a couple. At the wedding Santana and Brittany insist that they should get married. At first they think it's a crazy idea but at the two's insistence, Kurt and Blaine get married alongside them. In 2020, they are still married and are a celebrity couple. Rachel is pregnant with their child, who is assumed to be a girl.

== Characterization ==
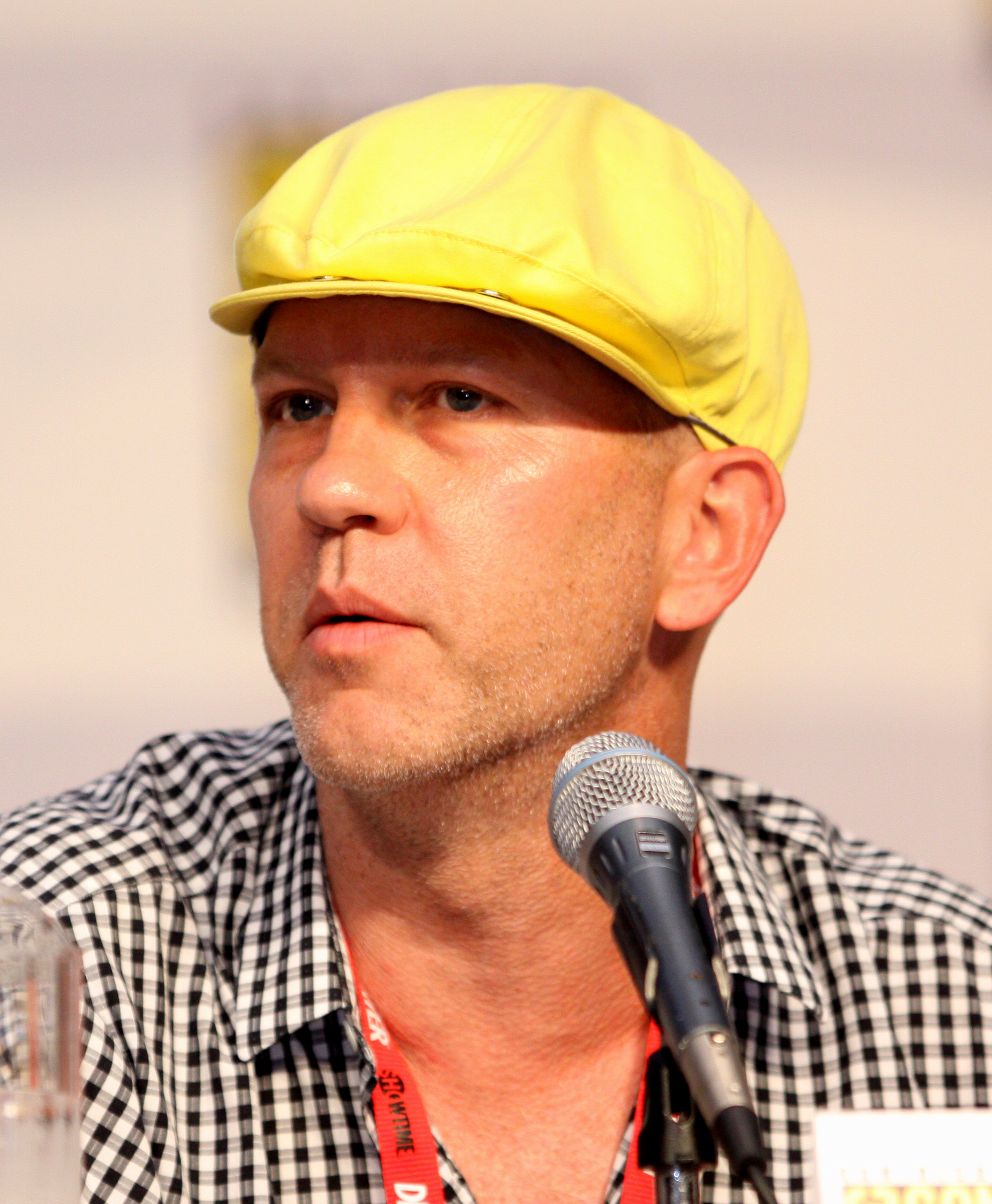
The scene where Kurt comes out is taken verbatim from the life of Glee creator Ryan Murphy (pictured).

According to Colfer, Glee's creators initially "were leaning on [Kurt] being overly flamboyant". However, the actor stated that he did not want to take that approach "because it's so overdone". Instead, he decided to portray the character as "more internal and superior." Colfer has explained that Kurt "puts on a very confident, 'I'm better than you' persona," but that "underneath it all he's the same anxious and scared teen everyone is/was at some point." Colfer also commented, "In later episodes, [Kurt] goes through an identity crisis, accepting and finding acceptance for who he is. He's a tough guy in designer clothes." In contrasting Kurt to his own personality, Colfer stated that Kurt is "very flamboyant and superior and uppity and into fashion", while Colfer had never heard of fashion designer Marc Jacobs before Kurt referenced him in the pilot episode. The second-season episode "Grilled Cheesus" addressed Kurt's atheism, with Murphy explaining that Kurt is "saying to the world, 'Prove [me] wrong: If God is kindness and love, make me believe in God.'"

Kurt reveals himself to be gay early in the show's first season. The scene in which he tells his father was taken verbatim from Murphy's own life. Murphy felt that the scene was "a great thing to put on television", because, while gay characters are often isolated and attacked, audiences have rarely seen an openly gay character who "wins and triumphs". He further explained, "The show is about making you feel good in the end. It's about happy endings and optimism and the power of your personal journey and making you feel that the weird thing about me is the great thing about me. I've done other shows with gay characters, and I will say that in many of those cases, the gay characters didn't have a happy ending. And I thought you know what? Enough." Colfer has commented that his biggest challenge was in ensuring the scene felt "honest" and not comical or "used as a punchline". He explained, "I think it's probably the first time a character's sexuality has been respected and almost dignified in a way, and I think that's really important, and there needs to be more of that on TV."

Kurt's acute sense of fashion is exhibited in his on-screen wardrobe. Glee's costume designer Lou Eyrich said in an interview with the Seattle Times that Kurt is one of her favorite characters to dress: "He never, ever repeats and you get to push yourself creatively. He's a perfect doll to dress because he'll try on anything." Eyrich set out to dress Kurt with tailored pieces that "exude his quietly flashy dapper dandyism", mindful that as the son of a car mechanic, "he doesn't have a lot of money".

=== Relationships ===
Kurt has a close relationship with his father Burt, who openly accepts his son after Kurt tells him that he is gay in the show's fourth episode, "Preggers". As the series progresses their relationship continues to grow stronger. Colfer has credited his off-screen relationship with O'Malley with improving the quality of their scenes together. Kurt has twice fallen in love. The first occurrence is initially alluded to in the episode "Acafellas", in which Kurt tells his friend Mercedes that he does have feelings for someone. Mercedes mistakenly assumes that Rachel, the glee club's lead singer, is the object of Kurt's affections, and although he later tells Mercedes that he is gay, he does not reveal to her that he is actually in love with the club's male lead, Finn. After Kurt hints to Finn of his attraction, their friendship becomes strained as Finn resists Kurt's machinations to get them together. The episode in which Burt defends his son against Finn's name-calling prompted a response from Eric Goldman of IGN, who declared it "one of the heaviest scenes Glee has ever delved into".

Before production on the second season began, Murphy confirmed that Kurt would be paired with a new romantic interest. According to Chord Overstreet, his character Sam Evans was originally intended to become Kurt's love interest. However, Sam's storyline was later adjusted to pair him with glee club member Quinn Fabray (Dianna Agron) after producers observed the chemistry between Overstreet and Agron. Kurt was subsequently paired with another new character, Blaine Anderson, a member of the rival show choir group the Dalton Academy Warblers, who is initially a mentor for Kurt. Murphy was unsure at first whether their relationship would become a romantic one, and stated that he wished to gauge public response to their friendship before planning future developments. He commented, "Part of me thinks he should be the boyfriend, part of me thinks he should just be the mentor. I didn't want to decide that until we got into sort of the middle of the season." Kurt transfers from McKinley High to Dalton Academy and falls in love with Blaine, though Blaine only considers him a close friend. However, when Kurt sings the Beatles song "Blackbird" in "Original Song", Blaine finally realizes his true feelings and the two kiss, marking the start of the relationship. Criss noted, "We all want to see Kurt happy, and like all great love stories, if you have two people that can be together you've got to hold it up." When imagining Blaine and Kurt's potential future together, Murphy expected to treat them the same as all other Glee relationships by making their pairing "as flawed and as exposed as everyone else's." This plan was confirmed by Falchuk after the characters kissed for the first time, though he later clarified: "They're solid. They have problems—you have two stars dating each other, there's going to be some competition there." In the second-season finale, they each tell the other, "I love you", and early in the third season they decide to have sex for the first time. The Kurt–Blaine relationship has been well received by critics, and they were named "one of the most beloved TV couples of the millennium" late in the second season by Jarett Wieselman of the New York Post.

In a July 2012 interview with E! News, Colfer elaborated in regard to the progression of the Kurt-Blaine relationship in the show's fourth season. Colfer said, "I would like to do something besides say 'I love you,' and I think Darren [Criss] and I agree on that. We're ready for the next step. They've been together for a while. Let's throw some spice and drama into that." In September 2012, Criss echoed Colfer's sentiment, "We're like an old married couple now. Let's shake it up!"

To begin the show's fourth season, Kurt moves to New York while Blaine continues to go to high school in Ohio, though he and Blaine remain a couple. However, after Blaine cheats on him, Kurt breaks up with Blaine. The two later agree to remain friends, though Kurt is unwilling to resume their relationship. That winter, Kurt begins to see Adam Crawford, a senior at his new school, NYADA. Despite this, Kurt has sex with Blaine when in Ohio to attend a wedding, putting into question whether Kurt still wants to be with Blaine.

Despite all this, Kurt and Blaine do get back together in a romantic relationship in the first episode of the fifth season, "Love Love Love", which is incidentally the same episode that Blaine proposes marriage. Kurt says yes immediately.

Kurt heads back to New York while Blaine finishes high school back in Lima. Eventually, midway through the fifth season, Blaine graduates and moves in with Kurt. They have difficulties and agree that it would be best for them to continue with their engagement but as Blaine lives somewhere else for now as they both need their space. They will cohabitate in the season five finale.

At the beginning for the sixth season, it seems as though Kurt and Blaine have broken off the engagement due to difficulties living together and Blaine has moved back to Lima. Kurt later regrets this and decides to continue his schooling in Lima, to try to win Blaine back.

When Kurt returns, he finds that Blaine is in a relationship with Karofsky. Despite everything that goes on in the beginning of the sixth season, Kurt and Blaine get back together in the beginning of the episode, "A Wedding". Later in the same episode, Brittany and Sue Sylvester persuade the couple to get married at Brittany and Santana's wedding to make a double wedding.

They continue through the rest of the sixth season as a wed couple and in the season six finale, "Dreams Come True", it is revealed that five years in the future, Rachel is carrying their child, a daughter.

== Musical performances ==
As Kurt, Colfer features in many songs that have been released as singles available for digital download and are also included in the show's soundtrack albums. In the episode "Wheels", Kurt performs "Defying Gravity" from the Broadway musical Wicked. Murphy selected "Defying Gravity" for the episode after Colfer related a story in which his own high school drama teacher had refused him the opportunity to perform the song because it was written to be sung by a female singer. Murphy explained, "I found a way to write it into the show because that's in a nutshell what this show is about: someone being told that they can't do something because of what the perception of them is as opposed to what their real ability is." Colfer stated that the opportunity to sing the song "meant the world" to him, and that "it's absolutely terrifying to watch yourself do something you've dreamed about for such a long time. I know I'm definitely not the best singer, but I think the message, the story behind the song about defying limits and borders placed by others, hopefully all that gets across with the performance. Although I do some very 'Kurtsy' things in the song, it's probably one of the most honest and close-to-heart scenes I've ever filmed or performed for that matter." Colfer's recording of the performance was released as a single, as well as two additional versions—one sung by co-star Michele, and another that was arranged as a duet for the two singers. The duet version charted at number thirty-one on the Billboard Hot 100, and was included on the show's first soundtrack album, Glee: The Music, Volume 1.

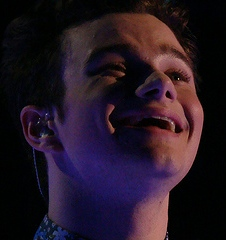
Colfer as Kurt performing The Beatles' "I Want to Hold Your Hand" during the 2011 Glee Live! In Concert! tour

In "Grilled Cheesus", when members of the glee club are singing songs about religion and spirituality, Kurt sings The Beatles' "I Want to Hold Your Hand", dedicating the song to his father, who is in a coma in the hospital. Murphy stated that it would have been easy to have Kurt, an atheist, sing an anti-religion song, but instead chose to have him sing about love. Critics disagreed over the appropriateness of this song choice. Anthony Benigno of the Daily News said he "found it particularly jarring to hear Kurt singing 'I wanna be your man' about his father", but Jessica Derschowitz of CBS News and MTV's Aly Semigran enjoyed that the performance of "I Want to Hold Your Hand" brought new meaning to the song, which Semigran named her favorite number of the episode. In "Special Education", when given his first opportunity to audition for a Warblers solo, Kurt asks Rachel for advice on selecting a song and she recommends "Don't Cry for Me Argentina" from Evita; the episode cuts between the two as they each sing the song. Both Colfer's and Michele's versions were released as singles, available for digital download, although neither appears on an album. Kurt and Blaine perform the duet "Baby, It's Cold Outside" during the Christmas-oriented episode "A Very Glee Christmas". The number was released on Glee: The Music, The Christmas Album, and although it was not also released as a single, it nevertheless reached number fifty-seven on the Billboard Hot 100. As a Dalton Academy Warbler, Kurt sings the harmony line to Blaine's lead in "Animal" by Neon Trees in the episode "Sexy", and in "Original Song" he sings "Blackbird" by The Beatles. He also sings primary lead in a duet version of "Candles" by Hey Monday, with Blaine as the other lead. All three songs were included on the soundtrack Glee: The Music Presents the Warblers, released on April 19, 2011.

Colfer's performances have been well received by critics, particularly "As If We Never Said Goodbye" in the episode "Born This Way". Meghan Brown of The Atlantic stated that the song was "absolutely stunning in every conceivable way". She thought that he had the emotional connection, the musicality, and the storytelling ability "down pat". Entertainment Weekly's Sandra Gonzalez also praised the rendition: "Kurt apparently picked up a few helpful notes ... from his Warbler brothers and emerged an even better solo singer than I recall. ... Most enjoyable, however, was a tenderness Kurt added to the song that I don't think could have been duplicated by any other member of this ensemble." In his review, Michael Slezak of TVLine commended Kurt's voice and gave the song an "A": "I feel like we haven't had too many strong musical moments from Kurt this season, but this number, which pushed Chris Colfer's countertenor to impressive heights, went a long way to erase the deficit." Rolling Stone's Erica Futterman wrote that it was "a sweeter moment than last season's 'Rose's Turn', but the high notes and big vocals are still there".

== Reception ==
=== Critical response ===
Kurt has received mainly positive reviews from television critics, with many saying that Colfer's portrayal (along with Jane Lynch's performance as Sue Sylvester) stole the show from lead actress Lea Michele as Rachel Berry. James Poniewozik, writing for Time, deemed his coming out "beautifully handled" and praised the series for subverting expectations with Burt's acceptance. Rick Bentley of McClatchy Newspapers praised Colfer's performance in the episode "Home" and deemed him deserving of an Emmy nomination. IGN's Robert Canning noted that "Grilled Cheesus", which focuses on Kurt's atheism and his father's heart attack, showed again that the Hummels' relationship was "the most affecting" of the show. Poniewozik appreciated the focus on Kurt and Burt in the episode and also named their relationship one of Glee's "strongest and most nuanced relationships". The primary criticism by CNN's Lisa Respers France of that episode was that it appeared to be an Emmy submission showpiece for Colfer. She said that "Grilled Cheesus" felt forced and disliked Kurt's angry "overwrought" reaction to his friends' prayers. Christie Keith, writing for the lesbian and bisexual media website AfterEllen.com, praised Kurt's storylines and suggested that Colfer should win an Emmy Award for his portrayal of Kurt dealing with his identity.

Critics were polarized by Kurt's storyline in the episode "Never Been Kissed". NPR's Linda Holmes found it "absurd" that a teenager as deeply in denial as Karofsky would transition from bullying to kissing Kurt so quickly and described it as "emotionally and behaviorally unsound". Leah Anthony Libresco of the HuffPost called the episode "extraordinarily counterproductive", and disapproved of Will treating Kurt's upset as the key problem, rather than the unchecked bullying provoking it. She found Blaine's advice to Kurt "misleading and dangerous", especially the suggestion that targeted children should be held responsible for confronting their attackers and putting themselves at risk of further injury, rather than for protecting themselves. Poniewozik noted that the storyline was inherently flawed, as the show had previously treated bullying in a light-hearted rather than serious manner, but said that its saving grace was the focus it placed on Colfer: "probably the strongest actor with the most interesting character among the Glee kids".

The love story involving Kurt and Blaine was met with critical acclaim, especially the events in the "Original Song" episode where the characters first kissed. Katie Morgan of Billboard stated, "It sure took them long enough, but we're so glad to finally see Kurt happy." The Boston Herald's Mark Perigard wrote, "It was utterly, sweetly romantic, and Criss sold the hell out of the moment. It's long overdue and it will silence the growing legion of critics out there who were unhappy with the pace of this story and why Kurt always seemed to be stuck in pure misery." Kevin Fallon of The Atlantic thought the kiss was "sweet" and said that he was pleased that it attracted no controversy whatsoever. Semigran praised the interaction between Kurt and Blaine, and characterized the kiss scene as a "sweet, real and, shockingly, un-hyped moment". She went on to commend the acting in the scene, and wrote that both actors "handled it with dignity and honesty".

Critics were enthusiastic about Kurt and Blaine's decision to have sex for the first time in "The First Time" episode. Canning said that Kurt and Blaine's "attempts to get a little wild", and "trying to grow up faster than they should", were "the better parts of the episode as they felt the most realistic". Futterman praised their departure from the bar as a "very faithful and honest scene". Crystal Bell of HuffPost was impressed by the way the characters' relationship "inspires gay youth in a way that we haven't seen on network television yet" and called them "amazing role models for all teens", and The Atlantic writer Kevin Fallon said it was "remarkable" and a "milestone" that "the decision by gay teen characters to lose their virginities is given equal weight to that of a straight couple".

=== Accolades ===
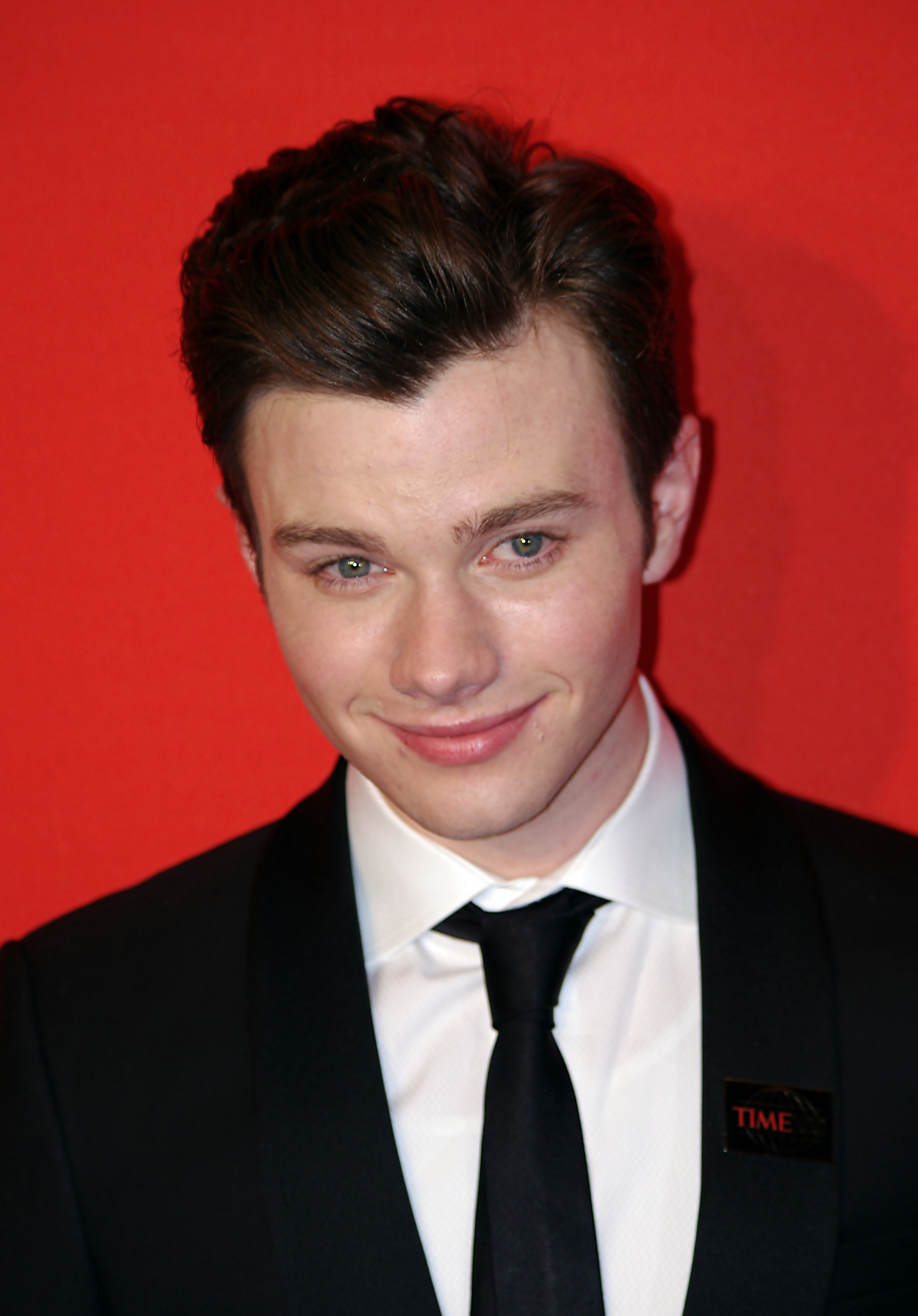
Colfer has won several awards and received many award nominations for his portrayal of Kurt.

Colfer has won several awards for his portrayal of Kurt. He was named Best Supporting Actor in a Series, Miniseries or Television Film at the 68th Golden Globe Awards. His performance in the groundbreaking role earned him a spot on the 2011 Time 100, Time's 2011 list of the 100 most influential people in the world. He and the other series regulars won Favorite New Diverse Ensemble Cast at the 2009 Diversity Awards. In 2010, Colfer was awarded Favorite Breakout Actor, Favorite TV Actor and Gay/Bi Man of the Year by gay entertainment website AfterElton.com, who also rated Kurt as the seventh best gay character of all time. AfterElton.com said, "Colfer's portrayal of Kurt is that he's taken a character that's in many ways a gay stereotype ... and turned him into a well-rounded person who can both make us laugh and break our hearts." Colfer also won the 2010 Choice TV: Male Scene Stealer accolade at the Teen Choice Awards, and was part of the Glee cast ensemble given the Outstanding Performance by an Ensemble in a Comedy Series award at the 16th Screen Actors Guild Awards. At the 2011 Dorian Awards, Colfer tied with co-star Jane Lynch for the TV Comedy Performance of the Year award. In addition to Colfer's own 2010 Golden Globe Award, the show won for Best Television Series — Musical or Comedy. Glee also received the 2010 and 2011 GLAAD Media Awards for Outstanding Series Comedy.

The role has earned Colfer nominations for further awards. He was nominated in the Outstanding Supporting Actor in a Comedy Series category at the 62nd Primetime Emmy Awards for his performance in the episode "Laryngitis", and at the 63rd Primetime Emmy Awards for his performance in "Grilled Cheesus". He received consecutive Best Supporting Actor in a Series, Miniseries or Television Film nominations at the 2009 and 2010 Satellite Awards. At the 17th Screen Actors Guild Awards, he was nominated for the Outstanding Performance by a Male Actor in a Comedy Series, and was included in the cast ensemble nomination for Outstanding Performance by an Ensemble in a Comedy Series, and was again included in the cast ensemble nomination for the 18th Screen Actors Guild Awards.
