= Homecoming (Hey Monday song) =

Single by Hey Monday

from the album Hold On Tight
- Released: October 7, 2008 (US)
- Recorded: 2008
- Genre: Pop punk, power pop
- Length: 4:02
- Label: Decaydance, Columbia
- Songwriter(s): Dave Katz; Sam Hollander; Cassadee Pope; William Beckett
- Producer(s): S*A*M and Sluggo

Hey Monday singles chronology
"Homecoming" (2008)	"How You Love Me Now" (2009)

"Homecoming" is a song by American rock band Hey Monday from their debut studio album, Hold On Tight (2008). A snippet of the song was included on Fall Out Boy's mixtape Welcome to the New Administration in August 2008. It was first released in the United States on October 7, 2008 as the band's debut single, before being released internationally throughout early 2009. "Homecoming" only charted outside the US, namely in Japan and Australia.

== Music video ==
The music video for "Homecoming" was directed by Noah Shulman and premiered on the group's Vevo channel October 2, 2009. The video was filmed at Asbury Lanes in New Jersey and focuses on a relationship between Pope's character and a former boyfriend, who is revealed to now be dating Pope's friend. Flashbacks give the viewer a sense of the relationship Pope and her ex had, while the current timeline shows the man playing the same tricks on his current girlfriend.

== Charts ==
Chart (2009)	Peak position
Australia (ARIA)	97
Japan (Japan Hot 100)	27
