= Candles (song) =

2011 single by Hey Monday

Single by Hey Monday

from the EP Candles
- Released: February 8, 2011
- Recorded: 2011
- Studio: Abbey Road Studios, London
- Genre: Pop rock
- Length: 3:00
- Label: Decaydance; Columbia
- Songwriter(s): Cassadee Pope; Mike Gentile; Sam Hollander; Dave Katz
- Producer(s): S*A*M & Sluggo

Hey Monday singles chronology
"I Don't Wanna Dance" (2010)	"Candles" (2011)

Music video
- "Candles" on YouTube

"Candles" is a song recorded by American pop punk band Hey Monday. The song was first included on the group's debut album, Hold On Tight (2008). While working on their scrapped second studio album, the band re-recorded the song; this new version was released on February 8, 2011 as the Candles EP, along with an acoustic demo of the song and a previously unreleased song called "The One That Got Away". A music video for the song debuted March 9, 2011 on Just Jared. "Candles" was the last single released by the group before they went on hiatus for Cassadee Pope to pursue her solo career.

== Track listing ==
Candles – Digital EP
No.	Title	Writer(s)	Length
1.	"Candles"	Cassadee Pope; Mike Gentile; Sam Hollander; Dave Katz	3:00
2.	"The One That Got Away"	Pope; Hollander; Katz; Eric Bazilian; Rob Hyman	3:47
3.	"Candles" (Demo)	Pope; Gentile; Hollander; Katz	2:46

== Credits and personnel ==
- Cassadee Pope – writer, lead vocals
- Mike Gentile – guitar
- Alex Lipshaw – guitar
- Michael "Jersey" Moriarty – bass
- Elliot James – drums
- Will Pugh – background vocals
- Clifford Carter – piano
- Rob Mathes - strings

== Chart performance ==
Chart (2011)	Peak position
US Rock Digital Songs (Billboard)	31

== Glee version ==
"Candles"

Single by Glee Cast

from the album Glee: The Music Presents the Warblers
- Released: March 15, 2011
- Genre: Pop
- Length: 2:51
- Label: Columbia / 20th Century Fox TV; Sony; Epic
- Songwriter(s): Cassadee Pope; Mike Gentile; Sam Hollander; Dave Katz
- Producer(s): Tommy Faragher; Ryan Murphy

The cast of Glee covered the song in their second season episode, "Original Song". In the episode, Blaine Anderson (Darren Criss) and Kurt Hummel (Chris Colfer) performed "Candles" as a duet as part of The Warblers' setlist for Regionals. As with almost every song performed on the show, the Glee cover was released as a digital single, on March 15, 2011. It is also included on the soundtrack album Glee: The Music Presents the Warblers. The Glee version proved to be more commercially successful than the original, charting in Australia, Canada, The United Kingdom, and The United States.

=== Chart performance ===
Chart (2011)	Peak position
Australia (ARIA)	100
Canadian Hot 100	86
UK Singles (Official Charts Company)	165
US Billboard Hot 100	71
