= Hey Monday =

American rock band

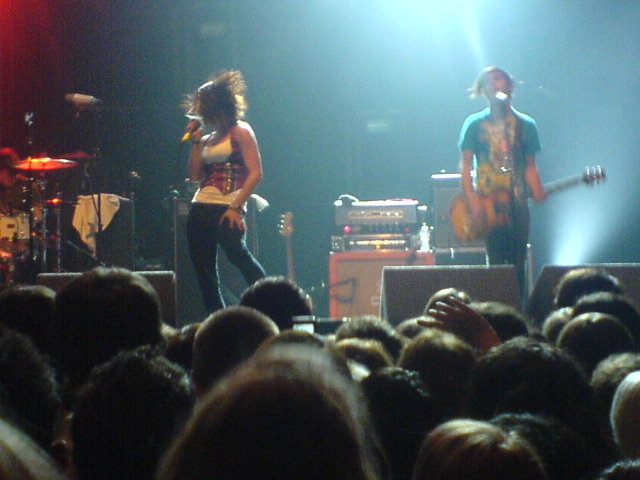
- Hey Monday performing in April 2009

Background information
- Origin: West Palm Beach, Florida, U.S.
- Genres: Pop-punk; pop rock; power pop; emo pop
- Years active: 2008–2011; 2019; 2024–present
- Labels: Decaydance; Columbia
- Members: Cassadee Pope; Alex Lipshaw
- Past members: Mike Gentile; Michael "Jersey" Moriarty; Elliot James; Patrick McKenzie; Chris Gentile
- Website: heymondaymusic.com

Hey Monday is an American rock band formed in West Palm Beach, Florida, in 2008. Its current line-up consists of Cassadee Pope (lead vocals, acoustic guitar, violin) and Alex Lipshaw (rhythm guitar, backing vocals). They released their debut album Hold On Tight in 2008, which produced the singles "Homecoming" and "How You Love Me Now". The album was followed up with their 2010 EP Beneath It All, which achieved moderate commercial success, and the Candles EP in 2011. Their most recent release, The Christmas EP, was released on December 6, 2011.

== History ==
=== Formation and Hold On Tight (2008–2009) ===
Hey Monday was formed in March 2008 after Cassadee Pope and Mike Gentile's former band Blake broke up. Pope and Gentile wanted to continue playing music and began holding auditions for a new band around their local Florida music scene. Pope and Gentile quickly joined forces with drummer Elliot James who then recruited rhythm guitarist Alex Lipshaw. Soon afterward, they enlisted bassist Michael "Jersey" Moriarty and Hey Monday was formed. Pope first caught the attention of A&R execs at a regional music conference. A&R rep Jay Harren would help the band get signed to Columbia Records. Fall Out Boy's Pete Wentz heard one of their demos while he was in the Crush Management office, and was also interested in signing them to his label, Decaydance, so the band ended up signing a joint deal with both labels. They recorded their debut album, Hold On Tight, throughout mid-2008. It released on October 7, 2008 to minor commercial success, charting on the Billboard Heatseekers albums chart. Soon after, they began extensive touring with the Academy Is..., We the Kings, the Cab, This Providence, A Rocket to the Moon, VersaEmerge and Cash Cash. The following year they supported Fall Out Boy on both their major U.S. and international tours. Their popularity grew and the band went on their first headlining tour with This Providence, The Friday Night Boys, Stereo Skyline, and the Bigger Lights as support. In late 2009, they supported All Time Low on the Glamour Kills Tour.

==== Departure of Elliot James ====
Following the band's headlining tour in the UK, James left the band and would be replaced by Patrick McKenzie. James would go on to tour with the group The Scene Aesthetic and reformed his former band Easton. At the beginning of 2012 Easton evolved into a new band, Break Blossom, which released a six-track EP, Last Night of Your Life, in May 2012, but the band split up six months later. James later launched a solo career, first releasing two singles in 2015 under the alias Baallet. Since 2016 he has released music under his own name, beginning with the EPs Soft Dreams Osaka (2016) and Favourite (2017). His debut solo album Always Lately was released in August 2019.

=== Beneath It All (2010) ===
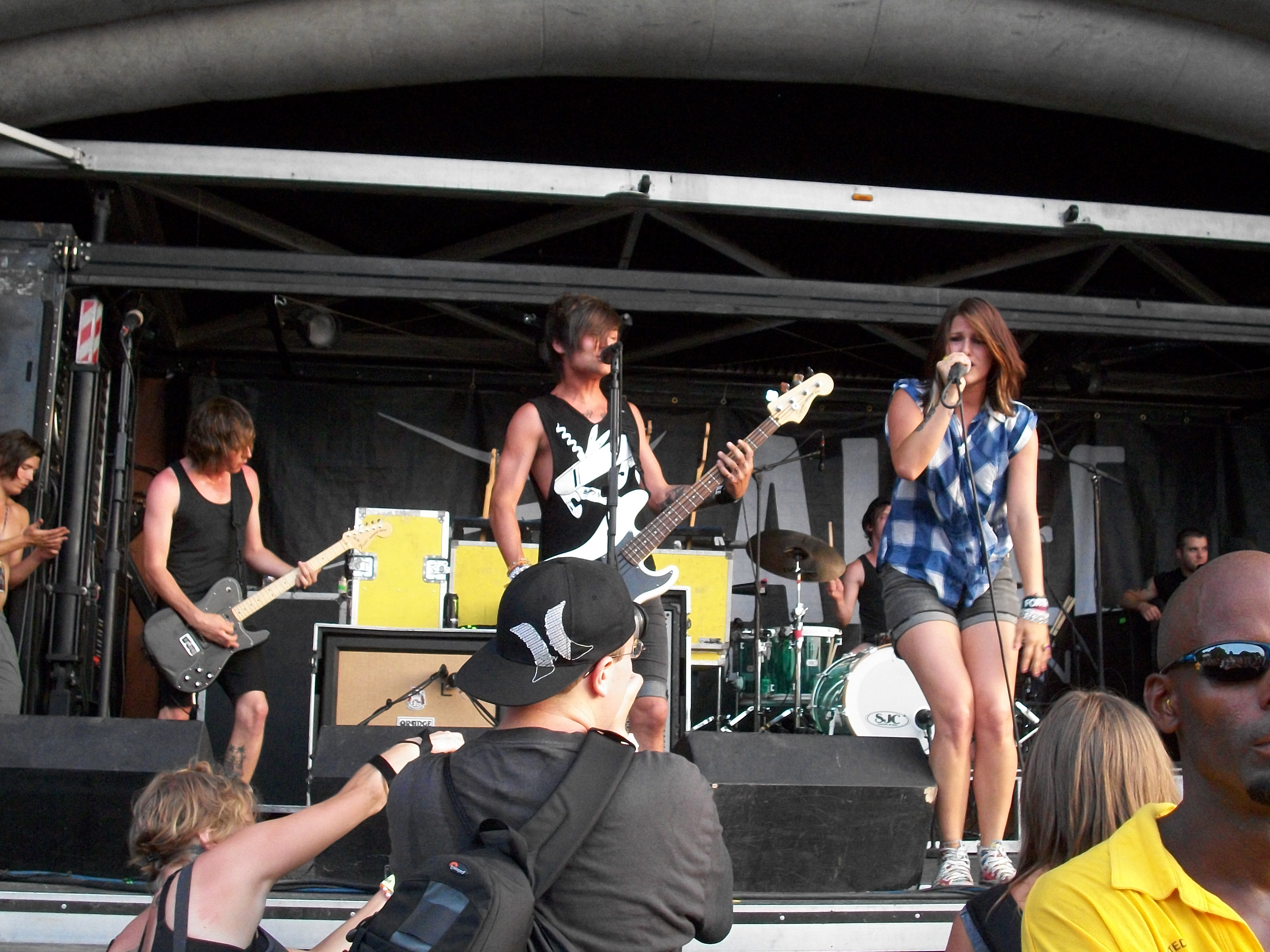
Hey Monday performing at Warped Tour in Charlotte, North Carolina in July 2010

Hey Monday spent the beginning of 2010 finishing the writing and recording of Beneath It All, which was originally going to be their second full-length studio album but was released as an EP. After finishing the writing and recording process, they went on the 2010 Alternative Press Tour with The Summer Set, Every Avenue, The Cab and NeverShoutNever. The band also played Bamboozle's Main Stage on Sunday, May 2. Hey Monday then played the entire Warped Tour 2010 on the Altec Lansing stage. The band performed two songs from Beneath It All on Jimmy Kimmel Live on September 22, 2010, "I Don't Wanna Dance" and "Wish You Were Here". Although Cassadee Pope and Mike Gentile were the only official members of the band at the performance, the fill-in musicians wore shirts with the absent band member's pictures on them. Hey Monday appeared in the fourth episode of the TV series Hellcats, "Nobody Loves Me But My Mother".

==== Departure of Michael "Jersey" Moriarty ====
In 2010, following the band's performance at Warped Tour, the group announced that Jersey would be leaving the band. Mike Gentile's brother Chris replaced him as Hey Monday's bassist. Jersey is now doing a solo project and has released an EP named Oh Boy Here We Go.

=== Christmas EP and hiatus (2011–2018) ===
On February 8, 2011, Hey Monday digitally re-released their second EP, Candles. A music video for "Candles" was released on March 9, 2011. "Candles" was covered on the Glee episode "Original Song", performed as a duet by characters Kurt Hummel and Blaine Anderson. In the spring of 2011, Hey Monday toured with All Time Low, Yellowcard, and The Summer Set on The Dirty Work Tour. In May 2011, Hey Monday played in Indonesia and went on a South American tour with NeverShoutNever that following August. In the fall of 2011, Hey Monday departed from the record labels Decaydance and Columbia. The band self-released The Christmas EP digitally on December 6, 2011 to iTunes and other digital outlets; it peaked in the top 10 of iTunes's Albums. On December 16 the band announced they were going on a hiatus. Pope went on to win the third season of NBC's The Voice. Mike and Chris Gentile went on to form Rescue Kid.

=== Present Day (2019–2026) ===
On November 25, 2019, after an eight-year hiatus, Pope, Gentile and Lipshaw played a set as part of the “Hey, it’s Monday” Nashville pop-punk show.

On November 15, 2023, Pope announced that Hey Monday, in their original line-up, would play their album Hold On Tight in full at the When We Were Young Festival on October 19, 2024. However, the week of the festival, Pope shared an Instagram story announcing that she and Alex Lipshaw would be the only founding members playing. Hey Monday also announced they would be playing on the Emo's Not Dead Cruise in 2025.

== Musical style ==
Hey Monday has been described as pop-punk, pop rock, power pop Lead singer Cassadee Pope's vocals have drawn comparisons to Canadian singer-songwriter Avril Lavigne and Hayley Williams of Paramore. emo pop.

== Awards ==
Year	Award	Category	Winner/Nominee	Result
2010	LA Rock Awards	Biggest Buzznet Buzz Band	Hey Monday	Nominated
2010	Alternative Press	Band of the Year	Hey Monday	Nominated

== Band members ==
Current

- Cassadee Pope – lead vocals, acoustic guitar, violin (2008–2011, 2019, 2024–present)
- Alex Lipshaw – rhythm guitar, backing vocals (2008–2011, 2019, 2024–present)

Former

- Mike Gentile – lead guitar, backing vocals (2008–2011, 2019)
- Michael "Jersey" Moriarty – bass, backing vocals (2008–2010)
- Elliot James – drums (2008–2009)
- Chris Gentile – bass, backing vocals (2010–2011, 2019)
- Patrick McKenzie – drums (2010–2011, 2019)

Touring

- Jason Brooks – lead guitar (2024–present)
- Carl Fields Jr. – bass (2024–present)
- Jess Bowen – drums (2024–present)

Timeline

== Discography ==
- Hold On Tight (2008)
