= Hold On Tight (Hey Monday album) =

Hold on Tight

Studio album by Hey Monday
- Released: October 7, 2008
- Recorded: June 1 – August 3, 2008
- Studio: Fresh Kills, New York City; Abbey Road, London
- Genre: Emo pop, pop punk
- Length: 37:30
- Label: Columbia, Decaydance
- Producer: S*A*M & Sluggo

Hey Monday chronology
| Hold on Tight (2008) | Beneath It All (2010) |

Singles from Hold On Tight
- 1. "Homecoming" Released: October 7, 2008; 2. "How You Love Me Now" Released: March 31, 2009

Hold on Tight is the only full-length studio album by American rock band Hey Monday, released on October 7, 2008.

== Production ==
Hold on Tight was recorded at Fresh Kills in New York City from June 1 to August 3, 2008, with producers S*A*M and Sluggo. Sean Gould served engineer, and recorded guitars with Mike Gentile, while Steve Shebby handled bass recording. Instrumentation on "Candles" was recorded at Abbey Road Studios by Clifford Carter and Peter Cobbin, with assistance from Lewis James. Stephen Harris mixed the album at The Cottage in Killham, UK, before it was mastered by Scott Hull at Scott Hull Mastering in New York City.

== Composition ==
All the songs featured on the album were co-written and produced by: S*A*M & Sluggo, who have worked with many other artists in the past, most notably Gym Class Heroes, Katy Perry and The Academy Is....

Hey Monday's lead singer, Cassadee Pope, explained when the band were writing the songs for the record, they wanted to create something that people could really enjoy and dance to, while still putting their hearts into the songs. Pope states "I feel that in the lyrics of the songs I’ve written for this album, I really was able to do this & the songs really show the diversity I feel I possess."

== Release ==
Hold on Tight was released on October 7, 2008. In October and November, the band supported the Academy Is... on their headlining tour of the US. In December, the band supported All Time Low on their Christma-Hanu-Kwanza tour in the US. On April 2, 2009, a music video was released for "How You Love Me Now". In April and May, the band supported Fall Out Boy on the Believers Never Die Tour Part Deux in the US. The band appeared at The Bamboozle festival in early May. Between mid-October and early December, the band went on a US tour alongside All Time Low, We the Kings and the Friday Night Boys.

== Reception ==
Professional ratings
Review scores
| Source | Rating |
|---|---|
| AbsolutePunk | 75% link |
| Allmusic | link |
| Alternative Press | link |
| Bombshellzine.com | link |
| LetsSingIt.com | (8.4/10) link |

Hold on Tight made headway in the Top Heatseekers chart peaking at number 11. By October 2009, the album's sales stood at 64,000. Critical response to the album was overall positive. Andrew Leahey of AllMusic guide gave the album a favorable review, stating, "There's certainly some filler here, particularly toward the album's conclusion, but Hold on Tight is still stacked with enough T.G.I.F. nuggets to make it an endearing, engaging debut."

Cleveland.com ranked "Homecoming" at number 96 on their list of the top 100 pop-punk songs.

== Track listing ==
Writing credits per booklet.

| No. | Title | Writer(s) | Length |
|---|---|---|---|
| 1. | "Set Off" | Hey Monday; Sam Hollander; Dave Katz | 3:27 |
| 2. | "How You Love Me Now" | Hey Monday; Hollander; Katz; Butch Walker | 3:18 |
| 3. | "Homecoming" | Hey Monday; Hollander; Katz; William Beckett | 3:58 |
| 4. | "Obvious" | Hey Monday; Hollander; Katz | 3:29 |
| 5. | "Candles" | Hey Monday; Hollander; Katz | 2:55 |
| 6. | "Run, Don't Walk" | Hey Monday; Hollander; Katz | 3:43 |
| 7. | "Josey" | Hey Monday | 3:19 |
| 8. | "Hurricane Streets" | Hey Monday; Hollander; Katz | 3:07 |
| 9. | "Arizona" | Hey Monday; Hollander; Katz | 3:37 |
| 10. | "Should've Tried Harder" | Hey Monday | 3:07 |
| 11. | "6 Months" | Hey Monday | 3:37 |

Japanese bonus tracks
| No. | Title | Writer(s) | Length |
|---|---|---|---|
| 12. | "Run, Don't Walk (live in Tokyo)" | Hey Monday; Hollander; Katz |
| 13. | "Josey (live in Tokyo)" | Hey Monday |
| 14. | "Candles (acoustic demo version)" | Hey Monday; Hollander; Katz |

== Charts ==
| Chart (2008) | Peak position |
|---|---|
| U.S. Billboard Top Heatseekers | 11 |
| Chart (2009) | Peak position |
| Australian Albums Chart | 71 |

== Personnel ==
Personnel per booklet.

Hey Monday

- Cassadee Pope – lead vocals
- Mike Gentile – guitar
- Alex Lipshaw – guitar
- Michael "Jersey" Moriarty – bass
- Elliot James – drums

Additional musicians

- Joseph Pepper – additional guitars (track 9)
- Will Pugh – additional vocals (track 5)
- Sam Hollander – programming
- Dave Katz – programming
- Rob Mathes – strings arranger, conductor
- Isobel Griffiths – strings contracted
- Perry Montague-Mason – concertmaster
- Warren Zalinski – 2nd violin leader
- Peter Lale – violin leader
- Anthony Pleeth – leader

Production and design

- S*A*M and Sluggo – producer
- Sean Gould – engineer, guitars recording
- Mike Gentile – guitars recording
- Steve Shebby – bass recording
- Clifford Carter – piano recording (track 5)
- Peter Cobbin – recording
- Lewis Jones – assistant
- Stephen Harris – mixing
- Scott Hull – mastering
- Bret Disend – executive producer
- Matt Govaere – art direction, design
- Bill Sitzmann – photographer
