= Glee: The Music, Volume 6 =

Soundtrack album by Glee Cast
- Released: May 23, 2011
- Genres: Pop, dance, soul
- Length: 64:19
- Label: Columbia / 20th Century Fox TV
- Producers: Dante Di Loreto (exec.), Brad Falchuk (exec.), Adam Anders, Peer Åström, Max Martin, Ryan Murphy, Shellback

Glee Cast chronology
Glee: The Music Presents the Warblers (2011)	Glee: The Music, Volume 6 (2011)	Glee: The 3D Concert Movie (Motion Picture Soundtrack) (2011)

Glee: The Music, Volume 6 is the eighth soundtrack album by the cast of the American musical television series Glee, released on May 23, 2011 through the Twentieth Century Fox Film Corporation and Columbia Records. The album serves as the sixth and final release for the series' second season, and contains three original tracks including "Light Up the World", which was co-written by Swedish songwriter Max Martin. All of its eighteen tracks have been released as singles, available for digital download.

== Background ==
Announced on May 3, 2011, Glee: The Music, Volume 6 is the final release from the second season of Glee, featuring music from the episode "A Night of Neglect" through the end of the season. The album's final three tracks—"As Long As You're There", "Pretending", and "Light Up the World"—are original songs. "As Long As You're There" is performed by guest star Charice and "Light Up the World" was co-written with Swedish songwriter Max Martin, who had previously helped to write "Loser like Me", another song for the series. Recurring guest stars Gwyneth Paltrow, Kristin Chenoweth, and Jonathan Groff appear as featured artists on the album. Glee: The Music, Volume 6 was released on May 23, 2011. "Light Up the World" premiered through Ryan Seacrest's website on May 10, 2011.

== Reception ==
Professional ratings
Review scores
Source	Rating
AllMusic	3.5/5 stars

Andrew Leahey of AllMusic gave the album a rating of three-and-a-half stars out of a possible five, and wrote that it "plays up the show's creative side". He cited "I Feel Pretty / Unpretty" as being "one of the show's prettiest tributes to self-acceptance", and also commends the Chenoweth and Matthew Morrison cover of Fleetwood Mac's "Dreams". Leahey noted that "the second half of the album doesn't fare as well as the first", but added that the album was better "than some of its predecessors". He criticized the inclusion of a "lackluster version of 'Dancing Queen'" when there were "better songs that didn't make the cut".

Many of the songs on the album were reviewed positively when they appeared on the show. Meghan Brown of The Atlantic wrote that "As If We Never Said Goodbye" sung by Chris Colfer was "absolutely stunning in every conceivable way". John Kubicek of BuddyTV called "Rolling in the Deep" as sung by Groff and Lea Michele "one of the best vocal performances this show has ever seen". Erica Futterman of Rolling Stone called the performance a "passion-filled winner", though she detected "some oversinging". Other songs were not as well received, including Paltrow's rendition of Adele's "Turning Tables". Futterman said the vocals "lacked the texture that made Adele's version so heartbreaking", and MTV's Aly Semigran wrote that while Paltrow is "a nice enough singer," she "in no way has the chops" the song requires.

Glee: The Music, Volume 6 debuted at number four on the US Billboard 200 and number one on Billboard's Soundtracks chart, selling 80,000 copies in its first week, giving it the second-lowest opening sales figure for a Glee release after the 48,000 copies sold by extended play Glee: The Music, The Rocky Horror Glee Show. It sold 25,000 copies in its second week, and stayed at the top of the soundtracks chart for three consecutive weeks.

== Singles ==
All tracks on the album have been released as singles, available for digital download. Glee's cover of Adele's "Turning Tables", performed by Paltrow, has charted at number sixty-six on both the Canadian Hot 100 and the US Billboard Hot 100. The single sold 47,000 copies in its first week in the US. A mash-up of "I Feel Pretty" from the musical West Side Story and "Unpretty" by TLC reached number twenty-two on the Billboard Hot 100 and also became a top forty hit in Canada, Ireland, and the UK. Selling 112,000 copies in the US, its appearance marked the first time "I Feel Pretty" charted on the Hot 100.

== Track listing ==
Unless otherwise indicated, Information is taken from Liner Notes

No.	Title	Writer(s)	Version covered	Length
1.	"Turning Tables" (featuring Gwyneth Paltrow)	Adele Adkins, Ryan Tedder	Adele (Samples Instrumental track from version covered)	4:06
2.	"I Feel Pretty / Unpretty" (featuring Dianna Agron and Lea Michele)	Leonard Bernstein, Stephen Sondheim / Dallas Austin, Tionne Watkins	West Side Story / TLC	3:59
3.	"As If We Never Said Goodbye" (featuring Chris Colfer)	Don Black, Christopher Hampton, Andrew Lloyd Webber	Patti LuPone from Sunset Boulevard	4:54
4.	"Born This Way" (featuring Chris Colfer, Jenna Ushkowitz and Amber Riley)	Stefani Germanotta, Jeppe Laursen, Paul Blair, Fernando Garibay	Lady Gaga (Samples Instrumental track from version covered)	4:06
5.	"Dreams" (Matthew Morrison featuring Kristin Chenoweth)	Stevie Nicks	Fleetwood Mac	4:16
6.	"Songbird" (featuring Naya Rivera)	Christine McVie	Fleetwood Mac	3:18
7.	"Go Your Own Way" (featuring Lea Michele)	Lindsey Buckingham	Fleetwood Mac	3:41
8.	"Don't Stop" (featuring Chord Overstreet, Dianna Agron, Lea Michele and Cory Monteith)	McVie	Fleetwood Mac	3:17
9.	"Rolling in the Deep" (Lea Michele featuring Jonathan Groff)	Adkins, Paul Epworth	Adele (A Capella arrangement based on the John Legend cover version)	3:24
10.	"Isn't She Lovely" (featuring Kevin McHale)	Stevie Wonder	Stevie Wonder	1:38
11.	"Dancing Queen" (featuring Naya Rivera and Amber Riley)	Benny Andersson, Björn Ulvaeus, Stig Anderson	ABBA	3:39
12.	"Try a Little Tenderness" (featuring Amber Riley)	Jimmy Campbell, Reg Connelly, Harry M. Woods	Ray Noble Orchestra (Musical arrangement based on the Otis Redding version)	4:01
13.	"My Man" (featuring Lea Michele)	Jacques Charles, Channing Pollock, Albert Willemetz, Maurice Yvain	Barbra Streisand from Funny Girl	2:15
14.	"Pure Imagination" (featuring Chris Colfer, Cory Monteith, Jenna Ushkowitz and Kevin McHale)	Leslie Bricusse, Anthony Newley	Willy Wonka & the Chocolate Factory	3:18
15.	"Bella Notte" (featuring Mark Salling, Kevin McHale and Chord Overstreet)	Peggy Lee, Sonny Burke	Lady and the Tramp	2:31
16.	"As Long as You're There" (featuring Charice)	Adam Anders, Peer Åström, Claude Kelly	Original composition	4:16
17.	"Pretending" (featuring Lea Michele and Cory Monteith)	Anders, Åström, Shelly Peiken	Original composition	3:57
18.	"Light Up the World" (featuring Heather Morris, Kevin McHale, Naya Rivera, Cory Monteith, Jenna Ushkowitz and Lea Michele)	Anders, Åström, Max Martin, Shellback, Savan Kotecha	Original composition	3:43

Japanese bonus tracks
No.	Title	Writer(s)	Version covered	Length
19.	"Ain't No Way" (featuring Amber Riley)	Carolyn Franklin	Aretha Franklin	3:52
20.	"Friday" (featuring Mark Salling, Kevin McHale, Chord Overstreet)	Clarence Jey, Patrice Wilson	Rebecca Black	3:32

Notes

- Even though Darren Criss, Jane Lynch & Jayma Mays are credited in the “Glee Cast Vocals” section of the Liner Notes, their vocals do not appear on this album.
- ”Unpretty” is allegedly based on the song “Make Up Your Mind”, written by Corey Glover and Michael Cirincione.

== Personnel ==
- Dianna Agron – cast, lead vocals
- Adam Anders – arranger, digital editing, producer, soundtrack producer, vocal arrangement, additional vocals, composer
- Alex Anders – digital editing, engineer, vocal producer, additional vocals
- Nikki Anders – additional vocals
- Benny Andersson – composer
- Peer Åström – arranger, engineer, mixing, producer, composer
- Kala Balch – additional vocals
- Shoshana Bean – additional vocals
- Leonard Bernstein – composer
- Dave Bett – art direction
- Don Black – composer
- PJ Bloom – music supervisor
- Ravaughn Brown – additional vocals
- Lindsey Buckingham – composer
- Geoff Bywater – executive in charge of music
- Charice – cast, lead vocals
- Kristin Chenoweth – cast, lead vocals
- Deyder Cintron – assistant engineer, digital editing
- Chris Colfer – cast, lead vocals
- Kamari Copeland – additional vocals
- Darren Criss – cast, vocals
- Tim Davis – vocal contractor, additional vocals
- Dante Di Loreto – soundtrack executive producer
- Brad Falchuk – soundtrack executive producer
- Chris Feldmann – art direction
- Serban Ghenea – mixing
- Ryan Gilmor – digital editing
- Jonathan Groff – cast, lead vocals
- Heather Guibert – coordination
- Christopher Hampton – composer
- Fredrik Jansson – assistant engineer
- Claude Kelly – composer
- Savan Kotecha – composer
- Storm Lee – additional vocals
- Andrew Lloyd Webber – composer
- David Loucks – additional vocals
- Jane Lynch – cast, vocals
- Meaghan Lyons – coordination
- Dominick Maita – mastering
- Max Martin – composer, producer
- Jayma Mays – cast, vocals
- Kevin McHale – cast, lead vocals
- Christine McVie – composer
- Lea Michele – cast, lead vocals
- Cory Monteith – cast, lead vocals
- Heather Morris – cast, lead vocals
- Matthew Morrison – cast, lead vocals
- Ryan Murphy – producer, soundtrack producer
- Stevie Nicks – composer
- Christian Nilsson – digital editing
- Jeanette Olsson – additional vocals
- Chord Overstreet – cast, lead vocals
- Gwyneth Paltrow – cast, lead vocals
- Shelly Peiken – composer
- Martin Persson – programming
- Nicole Ray – production coordination
- Amber Riley – cast, lead vocals
- Naya Rivera – cast, lead vocals
- Mark Salling – cast, lead vocals
- Drew Ryan Scott – additional vocals
- Onitsha Shaw – additional vocals
- Shellback – composer, producer
- Jenny Sinclair – coordination
- Stephen Sondheim – composer
- Björn Ulvaeus – composer
- Jenna Ushkowitz – cast, lead vocals
- Windy Wagner – additional vocals
- Joe Wohlmuth – engineer
- Stevie Wonder – composer

Source: Allmusic

== Charts ==
=== Weekly charts ===
Chart (2011)	Peak position
Australian Albums (ARIA)	3
Belgian Albums (Ultratop Wallonia)	89
Canadian Albums (Billboard)	4
Dutch Albums (Album Top 100)	83
French Albums (SNEP)	119
Irish Albums (IRMA)	4
Mexican Albums (AMPROFON)	49
New Zealand Albums (RMNZ)	3
Scottish Albums (Official Charts)	6
UK Albums (Official Charts)	6
US Billboard 200	4
US Soundtrack Albums (Billboard)	1

=== Year-end charts ===
Chart (2011)	Position
Australian Albums (ARIA)	89
UK Albums (OCC)	179
US Soundtrack Albums (Billboard)	12

== Certifications ==
Certifications
Region	Certification	Certified units/sales
Australia (ARIA)	Gold	35,000^{^}
United Kingdom (BPI)	Gold	100,000^{‡}
^{^} Shipments figures based on certification alone.^{‡} Sales+streaming figures based on certification alone.

== Release history ==
List of release dates, showing country and formats released
Country	Release date	Format(s)
Canada	May 23, 2011	CD, digital download
United States	May 23, 2011	CD, digital download
Australia	May 27, 2011	Digital download
Ireland	May 27, 2011	Digital download
New Zealand	May 30, 2011	Digital download
United Kingdom	June 6, 2011	Digital download
Italy	October 25, 2011	CD, digital download
