= Get It Right (Glee cast song) =

Single by Glee Cast

from the album Glee: The Music, Volume 5
- Released: March 15, 2011
- Genre: Pop
- Length: 3:47
- Label: Columbia
- Songwriters: Adam Anders, Nikki Hassman, Peer Åström
- Producers: Adam Anders, Peer Astrom

Glee Cast singles chronology
"Landslide" (2011)	"Get It Right" (2011)	"Loser like Me" (2011)

"Get It Right" is a song performed by the cast of American television series Glee, taken from their sixth soundtrack album, Glee: The Music, Volume 5. It is sung by Lea Michele who portrays the series' lead character, Rachel Berry. The song was written by the series' music producer Adam Anders, who created the song with his wife Nikki Hassman, and writing partner Peer Åström. Anders and company wrote the song specifically for Michele, and based the lyrics on Rachel's storyline. The song was released with a number of Glee songs on the iTunes Store on March 15, 2011. Musically, "Get It Right" is a piano-driven pop ballad, with mild country influences. According to MTV's Aly Semigran, the song has similarities to Britney Spears' "Everytime" (2004).

Critics praised Michele's vocals but found the song boring. The lyrics of the song revolve around self-doubt over a lost relationship. The song debuted at number sixteen on the US Billboard Hot 100, and appeared in the top forty in three other countries. The song's performance was featured in the Glee episode "Original Song" which first aired on March 15, 2011 in which Berry (Michele) used a bedazzled microphone, backed by Brittany Pierce (Heather Morris) and Tina Cohen-Chang (Jenna Ushkowitz).

== Background ==
On February 23, 2011, it was announced that Glee, for the first time, would feature two original songs, entitled "Get It Right" and "Loser like Me" on their March 15, 2011 episode. The song was written by series music producer Adam Anders with his wife Nikki Hassman, and writing partner Peer Åström. According to Anders the song was specifically crafted for Michele and was based on the storyline of Michele's character in the series, Rachel Berry. Anders told Entertainment Weekly, "Lea’s storyline kind of inspired that song for me,” says Anders. "Basically, you try to do everything right and you have good motivations with everything you’re doing but everything ends up going wrong. How many times will it take for me to get it right?"

In an interview with TV Guide Anders expressed the same sentiments, responding, "I've watched Rachel struggle. She's always trying to do the right thing, or thinks she's trying to do the right thing, and it always gets messed up." Anders also said that this song is "her asking when things are going to work out," and commented that it was "emotional" and thought that it would bring people to tears. "Get It Right" and "Loser Like Me" both premiered on On Air with Ryan Seacrest on February 25, 2011, and were performed in the episode "Original Song", on March 15, 2011. The song was also released on the iTunes Store in the United States on March 15, 2011. In the episode performance, Rachel Berry (Michele) appears performing the song with a bedazzled microphone, wearing a blue dress, black belt, and boots, accompanied by Brittany Pierce (Heather Morris) and Tina Cohen-Chang (Jenna Ushkowitz) in the background.

== Composition ==
"Get It Right"
A sample of "Get It Right," a pop ballad sung by Lea Michele.

"Get It Right" is a "somber" pop ballad performed by Lea Michele. Becky Bain of Idolator said song sounded like it could "actually live" on country airplay. According to the sheet music published at Musicnotes.com by TCF Music Publishing, "Get It Right" is set in common time with a tempo of 84 beats per minute. It is composed in the key of B minor with Michele's vocal range spanning from the low-note of A_{3} to the high-note of E_{5}. The song features the chord progression of Bm–G–D–A^{6}. Brian Voerding of AOL Radio Blog said the song was "a lonesome piano ballad backed by rich orchestration, best filed under 'classic diva tune.'" Voerding also said that Michele's "clean voice bites under and glides above timeless lyrics of self-doubt over love recently lost." Lyrically the song is based upon the storyline of Michele's character, Rachel Berry, which involves her watching her ex, Finn Hudson (Cory Monteith), leave her and get back with his ex-girlfriend Quinn Fabray (Dianna Agron). According to Aly Semigran of MTV News the song's opening moments are similar to "Everytime" by Britney Spears, and features "fluttering piano and breathy vocals" that come "into its own as it builds."

== Critical reception ==
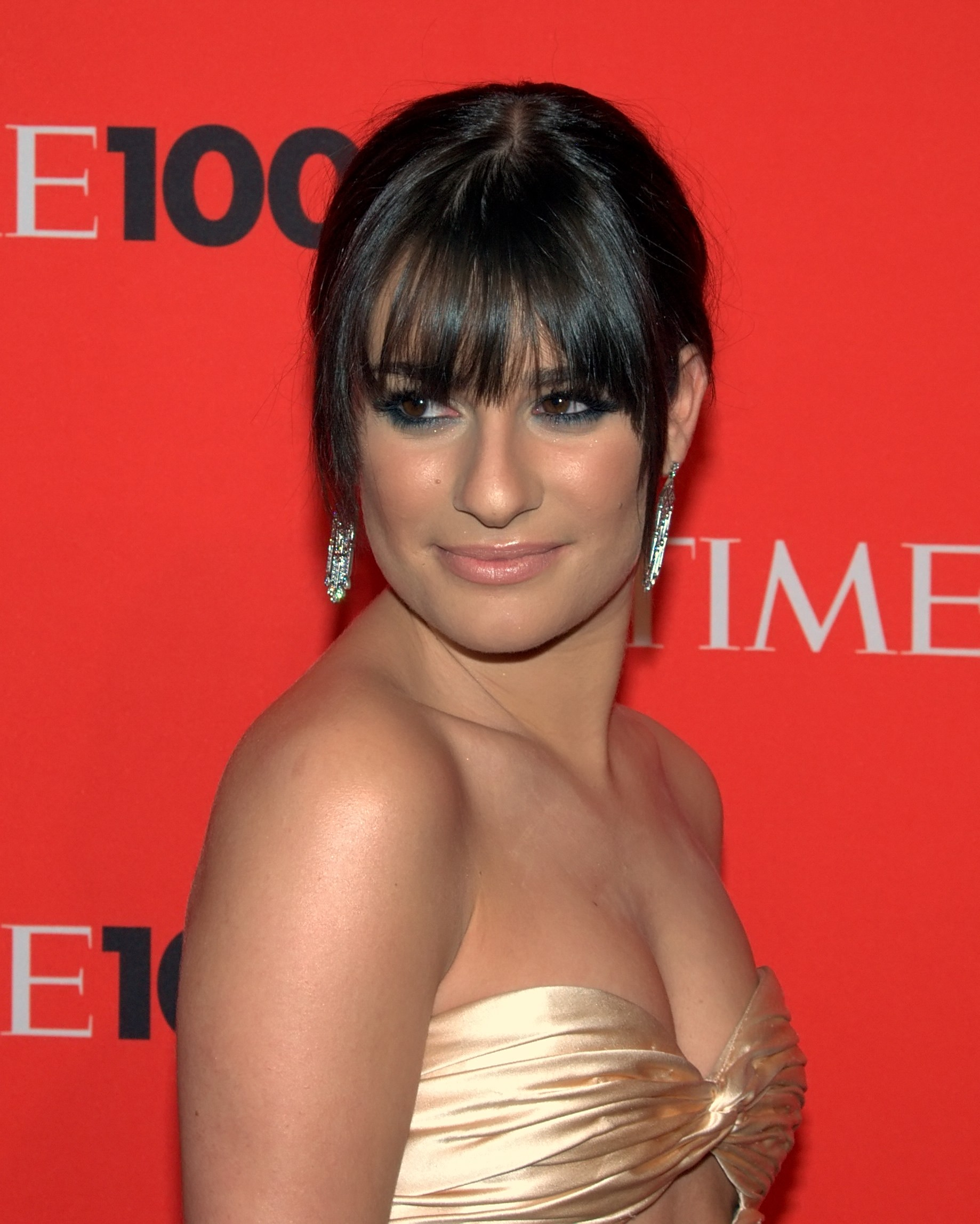
Lea Michele (pictured) received critical acclaim for her vocals in "Get It Right."

Reviewing the track for AOL Radio Blog, Voerding wrote "Michele's voice is among the cast's most versatile, striding confidently through growls and whispers, proclamations and wavering cries. This single, with the drive of its melody and narrative, is no exception." Kirsten Coachman of the Seattle Post-Intelligencer called Michele's voice on the song "phenomenal," and commented "I love how her vocals are reined in, and then build up to that wonderful glory note. I seriously got chills while listening to it." She also commented how the song's narrative fit Michele's storyline on the show. Christopher Rosen of Movieline wrote "If you love Lea Michele’s voice, you’ll like "Get It Right." Becky Bain of Idolator said "This one, compared to the instantly catchy “Loser Like Me”, is a bit more underwhelming, though Lea kills it." Jarret Wieselman of New York Post said "Lea Michele's voice was on point throughout this soaring ballad, but without that secret ingredient, lyrics like "my best intentions keep making a mess of things" are best left to Rachel's diary." Although she called it "boring" and said it was like every other reflection-ballad performed by Michele, Erica Futterman of Rolling Stone said that the song would fit in on Top 40 radio. Melinda Newman of HitFix said the song was "lovely, but a bit dull."

== Chart performance ==
On the week ending March 26, 2011, "Get It Right" debuted at number sixteen on the US Billboard Hot 100 selling 151,000 downloads in its first week. The song's debut was a part of a string of five other debuts from the television series which sold 712,000 downloads that week. Outside the United States, the song appeared on several other charts worldwide, debuting at number twenty-three on the Canadian Hot 100, as well as appearing at number thirty-four on the Australian Singles Chart, and number thirty-eight on the Irish Singles Chart.

== Charts ==
Chart (2011)	Peak position
Australia (ARIA)	34
Canada Hot 100 (Billboard)	23
Ireland (IRMA)	38
UK Singles (Official Charts Company)	31
US Billboard Hot 100	16
