= Glee season 2 =

2010–11 season of American musical comedy-drama

Glee
- Season 2
- Promotional poster and home media cover art
- Starring: Dianna Agron; Chris Colfer; Jessalyn Gilsig; Jane Lynch; Jayma Mays; Kevin McHale; Lea Michele; Cory Monteith; Heather Morris; Matthew Morrison; Mike O'Malley; Amber Riley; Naya Rivera; Mark Salling; Jenna Ushkowitz
- No. of episodes: 22

Release
- Original network: Fox
- Original release: September 21, 2010 – May 24, 2011

Season chronology
- ← Previous; Season 1 Next → Season 3

The second season of the musical comedy-drama television series Glee originally aired between September 21, 2010, and May 24, 2011, on Fox in the United States. The 22-episode season was produced by 20th Century Fox Television and Ryan Murphy Television, with executive producers Dante Di Loreto and series co-creators Ryan Murphy and Brad Falchuk, with the other series co-creator, Ian Brennan, as co-executive producer.

The series features the New Directions glee club at the fictional William McKinley High School in the town of Lima, Ohio. Season two follows the club competing on the show choir circuit, while its members and faculty deal with sex, religion, homophobia, financial difficulties, rumors, teenage drinking, death and other social issues. The central characters are glee club director Will Schuester (Matthew Morrison), cheerleading coach Sue Sylvester (Jane Lynch), guidance counselor Emma Pillsbury (Jayma Mays), and glee club members Artie Abrams (Kevin McHale), Brittany Pierce (Heather Morris), Finn Hudson (Cory Monteith), Kurt Hummel (Chris Colfer), Mercedes Jones (Amber Riley), Noah "Puck" Puckerman (Mark Salling), Quinn Fabray (Dianna Agron), Rachel Berry (Lea Michele), Santana Lopez (Naya Rivera) and Tina Cohen-Chang (Jenna Ushkowitz). Will's ex-wife Terri (Jessalyn Gilsig) and Kurt's father Burt (Mike O'Malley) round out the list of main characters. This is the only season in which O'Malley is a regular cast member in the series.

The season received generally positive reviews from critics. The musical performances from the second season expanded on the success of the first season, with the show releasing five soundtrack albums and over one hundred digital singles. The cast decisively broke the record for most charted songs by an act in the 52-year history of the Billboard Hot 100 with 156 appearances through the end of its second season. Two singles, "Teenage Dream" and "Loser like Me", were the first to have over 200,000 downloads in their first week of release in the US, and both charted in the top ten in the US and Canada, and have been certified gold in the US. The season was nominated for twelve Emmy Awards, five Golden Globe Awards, five Satellite Awards and over fifty other awards. Three DVDs have been released with episodes from the season: Glee – Season 2, Volume 1 featuring episodes one through ten, Glee – Season 2, Volume 2 featuring episodes eleven through twenty-two, and Glee – The Complete Second Season.

== Production ==
The season was produced by 20th Century Fox Television and Ryan Murphy Television, and aired on Fox in the US. The executive producers were Dante Di Loreto, and series creators Ryan Murphy and Brad Falchuk, with Murphy serving as showrunner and co-creator Ian Brennan acting as co-executive producer. All episodes were written by Murphy, Falchuk and Brennan. Murphy and Falchuk directed three episodes each, while other episodes were directed by Alfonso Gomez-Rejon, Eric Stoltz, Adam Shankman, Bradley Buecker, Carol Banker, Paris Barclay, Tate Donovan and Tim Hunter. Each episode cost $3.2 million–$3.8 million to produce, an increase of 20 percent on the first season, with the exception of the Super Bowl episode, which was estimated to cost as much as $5 million, and the season finale, which required a week filmed on location in New York City, and was the most expensive Glee episode yet, at a reported $6 million.

The season began airing on September 21, 2010, in the 8 pm (ET) timeslot on Tuesdays. A special episode aired after Super Bowl XLV on February 6, 2011. Fox planned to move the show to the 9 pm time slot on Wednesdays following the Super Bowl, but the network later revised its schedule, leaving Glee on Tuesdays in order to concentrate on building up its weaker Wednesday and Thursday line-ups. Episode eighteen, "Born This Way", became Glee's first 90-minute episode. Its runtime was extended from the standard 60 minutes to allow the inclusion of more musical numbers. The season concluded on May 24, 2011, with the episode moved to the 9 pm (ET) timeslot following the American Idol finale. The commissioning of a third season was announced on May 23, 2010, before the first season had concluded airing.

Murphy intended the second season to accentuate focus on formerly minor characters, particularly Santana, Brittany and Mike. He commented, "Everyone gets a chance to shine this season. Instead of going bigger and overstuffing Season 2, which people would expect, we're going under it. We'll pick up on the stories of our main cast, but we're also going to spend time on the support characters. Everyone gets their moment." Not all of his plans came to fruition; in July 2010, Murphy claimed that glee club co-captains Finn and Rachel would remain in a relationship throughout the season, however this was abandoned in favor of a love-triangle storyline to generate conflict. One unintended development was the emergence of Kurt as a central character—his role grew in prominence as a result of the writers' desire to do justice to the gay bullying storyline.

Reluctant to produce too many tribute episodes, Murphy limited the season to two: the Spears tribute "Britney/Brittany", and "Rumours", the series' first episode to pay tribute to an album, Fleetwood Mac's Rumours. The fifth episode, "The Rocky Horror Glee Show" served as an additional homage to The Rocky Horror Show. Although Murphy had planned to showcase original songs in Glee as early as October 2009, they featured for the first time during the second season, after he found a way to include the concept organically, in the form of a glee club assignment.

== Episodes ==
No. overall	No. in season	Title	Directed by	Written by	Original release date	Prod. code	US viewers (millions)
23	1	"Audition"	Brad Falchuk	Ian Brennan	September 21, 2010	2ARC01	12.45
McKinley High's glee club and cheerleading squad budgets are cut to allocate more money for the football program and its new football coach Shannon Beiste. Will and Sue scheme to drive Beiste out of the school and get their money restored. Finn and Rachel try to find new recruits for New Directions, but Rachel feels threatened by the talent of her recruit, Sunshine, who is put off by Rachel's hostile behavior and instead joins Vocal Adrenaline. Meanwhile, Finn tries to recruit transfer student Sam Evans after overhearing him sing, but Sam declines to audition due to the club's low social status. Quinn replaces Santana as head of the Cheerios. Artie asks Finn to help him join the football team in hopes to win back Tina, who has begun dating Mike; Beiste kicks Finn off the football team, believing he is colluding against her by forcing her to reject a student who uses a wheelchair. Realizing his behavior has hurt Beiste, Will defends Beiste against Sue and apologizes, re-earning Sue's enmity towards Will.
24	2	"Britney/Brittany"	Ryan Murphy	Ryan Murphy	September 28, 2010	2ARC02	13.51
New Directions wants to perform a Britney Spears number at the Homecoming Assembly, but Will is reluctant, stating that Spears is a bad role model. Emma's new boyfriend Carl, a dentist, treats glee club members Brittany, Santana, Rachel and Artie, all of whom experience Britney Spears fantasies while under anesthesia. Beiste allows Artie to join the football team, and Finn is reinstated. Advised by Emma to relax, Will learns that Carl recently purchased a Chevrolet Corvette and buys one for himself. He is confronted by Terri, who insists that he return it and cease waisting their savings. Will ultimately okays a Spears number and takes a lead role in the hopes of impressing Emma; Sue sets off the fire alarm when multiple students become sexually aroused by the performance. Emma tells Will to stop trying to be someone he is not, and Will later informs the club they will not be performing any more Spears numbers.
25	3	"Grilled Cheesus"	Alfonso Gomez-Rejon	Brad Falchuk	October 5, 2010	2ARC03	11.20
Upon seeing the face of Jesus in his grilled cheese sandwich, Finn has an existential crisis. Because of this, the members of the glee club discuss religion and its significance to them. Kurt is devastated when his father Burt has a heart attack and becomes comatose. Kurt is resistant to his friends' prayers, and is persuaded by Sue to make a formal complaint against the glee club for singing religious songs in a public school setting. After being confronted by Emma, Sue reveals that, as a child, she prayed that God would cure her sister Jean; her prayers went unanswered, leading her to conclude that God simply does not exist. Sue later visits Jean and they discuss their respective religious beliefs. At Burt's bedside, Kurt tells his unconscious father that he feels he should have accepted his friends' prayers; Burt then begins to regain consciousness and is able to squeeze his son's hand.
26	4	"Duets"	Eric Stoltz	Ian Brennan	October 12, 2010	2ARC04	11.36
When Puck is sent to a juvenile detention center, Will introduces Sam as a new member, and assigns a duet competition for the week. Kurt wants to partner with Sam because he suspects Sam might be gay, but Finn and Burt dissuade him, leading Kurt to sing alone. Noticing Kurt's withdrawn behavior, Rachel convinces Kurt that the club members value and accept him for who he is. Brittany and Santana make out, but Santana trivializes their relationship and pairs up with Mercedes for the duet competition. Brittany later pairs up with Artie and the two begin dating, but Artie is hurt when Santana tells him that Brittany only wanted him for his voice so she could win the competition. Finn and Rachel secretly throw the competition so that Sam will feel welcome and make him more likely to stay in the club. Sam and his duet partner Quinn end up winning the competition, and their victory dinner turns into a first date for the couple.
27	5	"The Rocky Horror Glee Show"	Adam Shankman	Story by : Ryan Murphy & Tim Wollaston; Teleplay by : Ryan Murphy	October 26, 2010	2ARC05	11.76
After Will learns of Emma's newfound love for The Rocky Horror Picture Show, he impulsively decides to have the glee club perform the stage version of the musical as a fundraiser in the hopes of winning her back from Carl. He recruits Emma to help him with the production, and casts Rachel and Finn in the lead roles of Brad and Janet; Finn feels self-conscious at the prospect of appearing in his underwear, as the role necessitates. Meanwhile, Sue goes undercover to expose the club's boundary-pushing production on her television news segment and convinces Will to involve her in the production. Will grows increasingly jealous of Carl and asks Emma to rehearse the suggestive "Touch-a, Touch-a, Touch-a, Touch Me" with him; Carl later confronts Will over his private rehearsal with Emma. Alerted to Sue's planned exposé, Will concedes that his motivations in putting on the production were questionable, and he cancels the play.
28	6	"Never Been Kissed"	Bradley Buecker	Brad Falchuk	November 9, 2010	2ARC06	10.99
Will separates the group for another boys vs. girls mash-up competition. Kurt is constantly harassed and attacked by school bully Dave Karofsky, and he criticizes the school's failure to act against homophobic bullying. While spying for the New Directions at Dalton Academy, Kurt meets Blaine Anderson, the lead singer of the rival group Warblers. Blaine, who is also gay, encourages Kurt to stand up for himself. Kurt later confronts Karofsky, and as the argument intensifies he is kissed by Karofsky, leaving Kurt stunned. Coach Beiste discovers that the boys and girls of the glee club are using her as a turn-off method to cool their arousal while making out. Beiste is deeply hurt and submits her resignation, but Will convinces her to stay at McKinley. Puck returns and develops a friendship with Artie through his community service project; he helps Artie get a date with Brittany.
29	7	"The Substitute"	Ryan Murphy	Ian Brennan	November 16, 2010	2ARC07	11.70
As the flu spreads throughout McKinley, Will becomes ill and is replaced by freewheeling substitute teacher Holly Holliday, who lets the glee club members choose which songs they get to perform. While recovering at home, Will is cared for by Terri; the two have sex, but Will concludes that their reunion was a mistake and ends their relationship for good. Sue takes over as principal when Principal Figgins also gets infected. Mercedes organizes a protest against Sue's new lunch initiatives and causes $17,000 worth of damage to Sue's car. Feeling guilty for enabling Mercedes' behavior, Holly confides to Will that she feels out of depth as a teacher. Sue's initiative ultimately proves popular with the students' parents, and her appointment as principal is made permanent. Kurt is confronted by Karofsky, who threatens to kill him if Kurt reveals his closeted homosexuality.
30	8	"Furt"	Carol Banker	Ryan Murphy	November 23, 2010	2ARC08	10.41
Burt and Carole reveal their engagement to Kurt and Finn, while Sue's absentee Nazi-hunting mother Doris Sylvester pays a visit when Sue announces her intentions to marry herself. Rachel tries to convince the glee club girls to have their boyfriends defend Kurt against Karofsky, but Finn refuses due to his position as quarterback. After Kurt admits that Karofsky threatens to kill him, Sue expels Karofsky. Quinn accepts a promise ring from Sam. At Burt and Carole's wedding, Finn uses his best man speech to apologize to Kurt, and the stepbrothers dance together. Kurt learns that the school board has reversed Karofsky's expulsion; Sue resigns as principal in protest, reinstating Figgins as principal, while Burt and Carole use their honeymoon savings to enroll Kurt at Dalton Academy.
31	9	"Special Education"	Paris Barclay	Brad Falchuk	November 30, 2010	2ARC09	11.68
Taking Emma's advice, Will decides to feature some of the less-heralded members of New Directions in the Sectionals competition by giving the lead vocals to Quinn and Sam, and lead dancing roles to Brittany and Mike. Kurt joins the Dalton Academy Warblers, but is not given a solo; Blaine suggests that he try to fit in rather than stand out. In Kurt's absence, Puck bribes AV Club president Lauren Zizes into joining the New Directions. Will is stunned when Emma reveals that she married Carl in Las Vegas. After discovering that Finn had lied about having sex with Santana the previous spring, Rachel confesses to Finn that she made out with Puck to make him jealous, causing Finn to break up with her. The New Directions, the Warblers, and the Hipsters face off at Sectionals; New Directions and the Warblers both advance to Regionals.
32	10	"A Very Glee Christmas"	Alfonso Gomez-Rejon	Ian Brennan	December 7, 2010	2ARC10	11.07
The faculty holds a Secret Santa gift exchange, but Sue tampers with it so she gets all the gifts. Artie finds out Brittany still believes in Santa Claus, and convinces the other glee club members not to disillusion her. When Brittany asks a mall Santa to make Artie able to walk again, Artie recruits Coach Beiste to play Santa in order to tell her it won't be possible after all. Kurt tells Will that he's fallen in love with Blaine. Finn refuses to reconcile with Rachel. The faculty members discover Sue's deception and reclaim their gifts, leading Sue to steal back the presents and vandalize the choir room's Christmas decorations. After overhearing the club's performance of "Welcome Christmas", a regretful Sue decides to return the presents to Will and brings the New Directions members to decorate a new Christmas tree.
33	11	"The Sue Sylvester Shuffle"	Brad Falchuk	Ian Brennan	February 6, 2011	2ARC11	28.32
Beiste forces the football players to join New Directions in order to dispel rivalry between the students. Sue attempts to sabotage both the football team and the glee club by moving the cheerleading Regionals competition to the same night as the football championship game. Karofsky convinces a number of the football players to quit the glee club, resulting in Beiste barring them from the championship game. Rachel, Mercedes, Tina and Lauren join the football team to ensure that the game goes ahead, and the glee club performs a "Thriller" mash-up during the halftime show. Finn gets Puck to convince the former football players to return, while Finn convinces Quinn, Brittany and Santana to quit the cheer squad to perform at the halftime show. With three cheerleaders down, Sue's cheer squad loses at Regionals for the first time in seven years. Impressed by Finn, Quinn later kisses him.
34	12	"Silly Love Songs"	Tate Donovan	Ryan Murphy	February 8, 2011	2ARC12	11.58
Will assigns the glee club to perform love songs in honor of Valentine's Day. For the occasion, Finn sets up a kissing booth to raise money for the club, and Quinn buys a kiss from him. The kiss further reignites Finn and Quinn's feelings for one another, and they begin an affair. Puck falls in love with Lauren and serenades her with a performance of "Fat Bottomed Girls". Lauren is offended by the song choice, but eventually agrees to spend Valentine's Day with him as friends. Blaine has a crush on Jeremiah, the assistant manager at a local Gap store, and the Warblers accompany Blaine as he serenades Jeremiah with a public performance of "When I Get You Alone". Jeremiah is fired over the performance and rebuffs Blaine. Kurt later confesses his feelings for Blaine, but Blaine reveals that he does not want to risk damaging their friendship.
35	13	"Comeback"	Bradley Buecker	Ryan Murphy	February 15, 2011	2ARC13	10.53
Rachel tries to get back into McKinley High's social swing with the help of Brittany, but her attempts backfire. Sam forms a Justin Bieber tribute band with Puck, Artie and Mike, in the hopes of cementing his relationship with Quinn, whom he suspects still has feelings for Finn. Quinn realizes that she wants to be with Sam, but Sam breaks up with her after Santana reveals that Quinn cheated on him with Finn. Sam then starts dating Santana. Puck tries to help Lauren gain more confidence for her first glee club solo. Sue is depressed from her cheerleading squad's recent competition loss, and Emma suggests that she temporarily join New Directions to lift her spirits. After failing to sow dissent in New Directions from the inside, Sue becomes the coach of Aural Intensity, a glee club rival for Regionals.
36	14	"Blame It on the Alcohol"	Eric Stoltz	Ian Brennan	February 22, 2011	2ARC14	10.58
Figgins commissions the glee club to perform a song teaching the student body about the danger of underage drinking. Rachel is convinced to throw a party for the club, and she invites Kurt and Blaine. After heavy drinking starts, Rachel and Blaine share a long kiss while playing spin the bottle. Blaine questions his sexuality and accepts a date with Rachel, much to Kurt's dismay. Rachel later kisses a sober Blaine, who realizes that he is indeed gay. After drinking with Beiste, Will tries to drunk-dial Emma but accidentally calls Sue, who publicly shames him by playing his voicemail on the school's intercom. The New Directions drunkenly perform "Tik Tok" for the student body, which abruptly ends when Brittany and Santana throw up from intoxication. Believing that the glee club had been acting during the performance, Figgins praises the club for scaring their fellow students into sobriety.
37	15	"Sexy"	Ryan Murphy	Brad Falchuk	March 8, 2011	2ARC15	11.92
Holly returns to McKinley to cover sex education classes. She unites with Will to educate the glee club members, who are among the most ignorant about sex, and the two begin a relationship. Finn and Quinn get back together. Kurt reveals to Blaine that he knows very little about sex, leading Blaine to visit Burt and prompt him to give Kurt "the talk". Santana and Brittany approach Holly for advice about their relationship. Santana tearfully reveals to Brittany that she is in love with her, but is afraid of being bullied for being in a same-sex relationship. Brittany reciprocates her love, but explains that she also loves Artie and will not break up with him. Emma and Carl also approach Holly to address issues in their marriage, particularly her continuing celibacy. When Emma confesses to still having feelings for Will, Carl moves out.
38	16	"Original Song"	Bradley Buecker	Ryan Murphy	March 15, 2011	2ARC16	11.15
When their planned anthem for the show choir Regionals competition is axed due to Sue's sabotage, the New Directions decide to write and perform original songs to compete against the Warblers and Aural Intensity. Brittany confronts Santana about their friendship, and expresses dismay that Santana is still dating Sam even after confessing her love to Brittany. Meanwhile, Blaine falls in love with Kurt after hearing him perform a tribute for the Warblers' canary mascot; the two share a kiss and begin a relationship. Rachel confronts Quinn over her relationship with Finn. After the club members share recent hurtful anecdotes by Sue, the New Directions perform an original song entitled "Loser like Me", an anthem dedicated to the underdogs of high school. New Directions ultimately win the Regionals competition.
39	17	"A Night of Neglect"	Carol Banker	Ian Brennan	April 19, 2011	2ARC17	9.80
In an attempt to raise money for Artie, Mike, Tina and Brittany's Academic Decathlon team, Holly suggests that the glee club host a benefit concert by performing songs from artists whom they feel are neglected. Emma's OCD worsens when Carl requests an annulment. Sunshine offers to perform for the benefit and promises to bring her six hundred Twitter followers. Sue sabotages the benefit by getting Sunshine's coach to pull her and her followers from the concert, and she gets Sandy and other McKinley students to heckle the glee club. Lauren convinces Mercedes to become a truly demanding diva to get what she wants, and Mercedes performs a powerhouse version of Aretha Franklin's "Ain't No Way"; Sandy is amazed by Mercedes' performance and offers to fund the Academic Decathlon team. Holly takes a job in Cleveland and breaks up with Will, leaving Will free to pursue Emma.
40	18	"Born This Way"	Alfonso Gomez-Rejon	Brad Falchuk	April 26, 2011	2ARC18	8.62
After Finn accidentally breaks Rachel's nose while dancing, Rachel considers getting a nose job, much to the glee club's dismay. Rachel ultimately decides against having surgery after Kurt reminds her that her idol, Barbra Streisand, refused to succumb to pressure to alter her nose. Will convinces Emma to attend therapy and confront her OCD. Lauren runs for prom queen and, with Puck's help, discovers that Quinn used to be an overweight outcast who had rhinoplasty before re-inventing herself and transferring to McKinley. Lauren tries to sabotage Quinn's campaign by revealing her former image to the other students, but her plan backfires when Quinn's popularity increases. Santana blackmails Karofsky into starting an anti-bullying club in order to convince Kurt to return to McKinley High and New Directions. Kurt agrees to return and the Warblers serenade him in farewell.
41	19	"Rumours"	Tim Hunter	Ryan Murphy	May 3, 2011	2ARC19	8.85
Sue revives The Muckraker, the school newspaper, and prints blind items about the kids in the glee club in order to sow discord among the members. Quinn gives Finn an ultimatum about their relationship and his friendship with Rachel. April Rhodes asks Will for his help with her new Broadway project: a one-woman show entitled CrossRhodes. Brittany breaks up with Artie after he quizzes her about her relationship with Santana and calls her stupid for not seeing through Santana's machinations. Santana agrees to go on Brittany's online talk show to let Brittany ask her to the prom, but she backs out at the last minute. Suspecting that Sam and Quinn are back together, Finn and Rachel plan a stakeout and discover that Sam is living in a shabby motel. Amidst growing rumors, Sam bitterly reveals to the glee club that his house was foreclosed upon. Upon discovering that Sam has pawned his guitar, the glee club buys it back for him and offers their support.
42	20	"Prom Queen"	Eric Stoltz	Ian Brennan	May 10, 2011	2ARC20	9.29
As the race for prom queen heats up, Principal Figgins recruits New Directions to perform at the prom. Mercedes is distressed because she doesn't have a prom date, and Rachel arranges for Sam to take the two of them as a group. Jesse St. James returns to woo Rachel, which angers Finn. Kurt takes Blaine as his date to the prom, and attempts to help Karofsky deal with his sexuality; Karofsky refuses to come out, but makes a tearful apology to Kurt. Karofsky is elected prom king, but non-candidate Kurt is elected prom queen in a derogatory prank. Kurt runs from the gym in humiliation, but later returns and proclaims "Eat your heart out, Kate Middleton", garnering applause from the crowd. Karofsky, abruptly faced with having to publicly dance with another boy in the traditional dance between King and Queen, is unable to go through with it, leading Blaine to dance with Kurt on the dance floor instead.
43	21	"Funeral"	Bradley Buecker	Ryan Murphy	May 17, 2011	2ARC21	8.97
As New Directions gets closer to Nationals, Will brings in Jesse to give advice on how to win the championship. Although Jesse deduces that Rachel is the best singer for the performance, Will ignores Jesse's advice and instead plans for the group to sing original songs at nationals. Sue is deeply upset by the death of her sister, and lashes out by sabotaging the club's travel itinerary to New York. Finn and Kurt get the club to help Sue plan Jean's funeral, and Will reads the remainder of Sue's eulogy when she is unable to finish it. During the funeral, Finn realizes his true feelings for Rachel and breaks up with Quinn. Touched by Will's support, Sue concludes that she will no longer attempt to destroy the glee club, and instead announces that she is planning to run for the United States House of Representatives. Terri helps Will by offering first-class plane tickets to New York for the entire club, and reveals that she is moving to Miami to start over with her life.
44	22	"New York"	Brad Falchuk	Brad Falchuk	May 24, 2011	2ARC22	11.80
The New Directions head to New York City for the National Show Choir Championship and faces Vocal Adrenaline once again, taking time to see landmarks while there. Finn is desperate to win Rachel back, and the two go out on a date. Rachel feels torn between Finn and her dreams of being on Broadway, and leaves after refusing to kiss him. The next morning, Rachel realizes that her true love is Broadway, and she and Kurt vow to return to New York City for college. At Nationals, Rachel encounters a nervous Sunshine, and apologizes for having made Sunshine feel unwelcome at McKinley. As the New Directions perform, the enthusiastic audience falls silent when Finn and Rachel suddenly share a long, unscripted kiss. The kiss imperils their chances of victory, and the group receives twelfth place. Back in Ohio, Blaine and Kurt declare their love for each other, Mercedes and Sam are revealed to be secretly dating, and Finn and Rachel resume their relationship.

== Cast ==
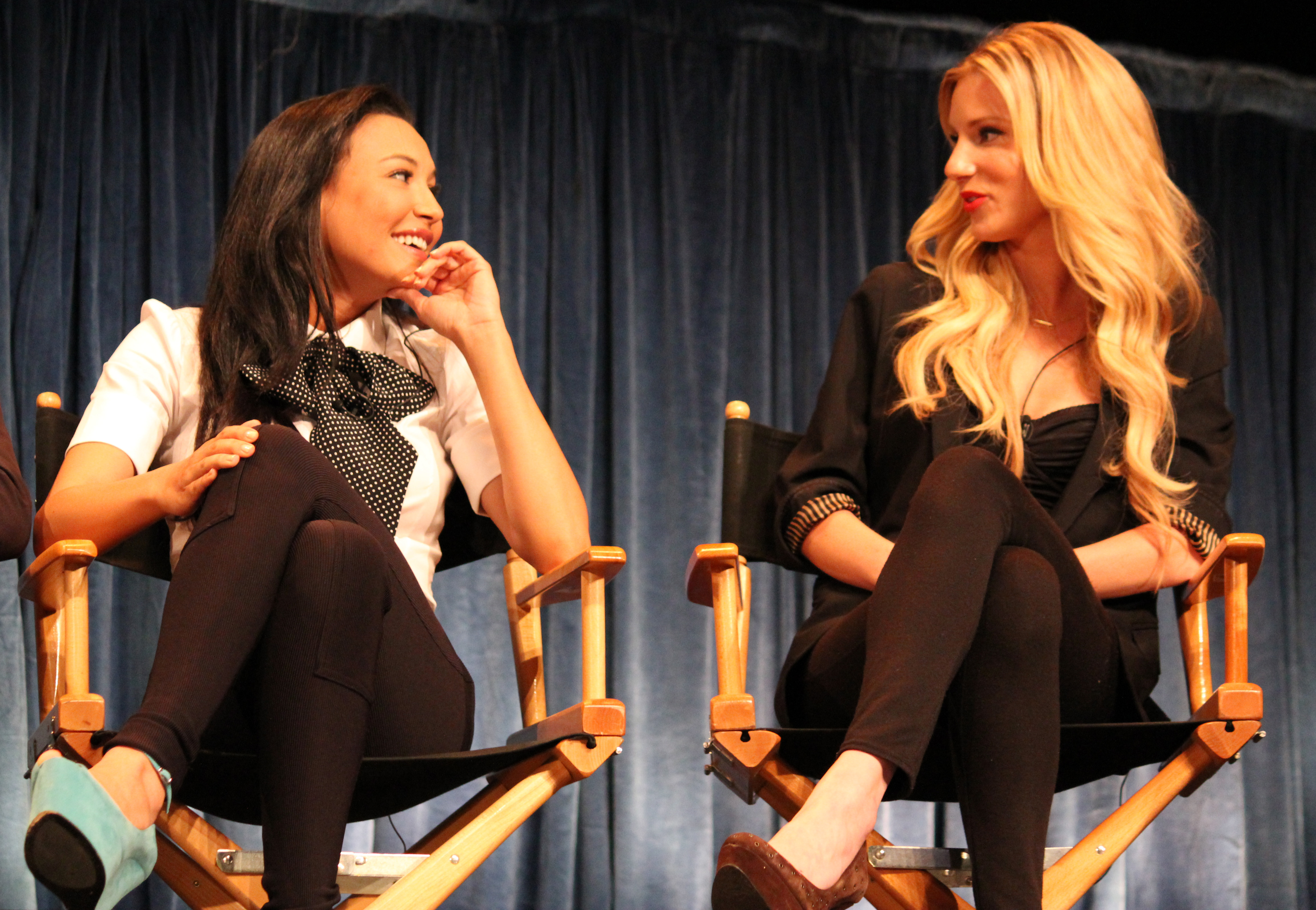
Naya Rivera (left) and Heather Morris (right) were both promoted to the main cast in the second season of the series.

The twelve main cast members from the first season returned for the second: Matthew Morrison as glee club director Will Schuester, Jane Lynch as cheerleading coach Sue Sylvester, Jayma Mays as guidance counselor Emma Pillsbury, Jessalyn Gilsig as Will's former wife Terri Schuester and Dianna Agron, Chris Colfer, Kevin McHale, Lea Michele, Cory Monteith, Amber Riley, Mark Salling and Jenna Ushkowitz as glee club members Quinn Fabray, Kurt Hummel, Artie Abrams, Rachel Berry, Finn Hudson, Mercedes Jones, Noah "Puck" Puckerman and Tina Cohen-Chang, respectively. Heather Morris and Naya Rivera, who portrayed the formerly recurring roles of Brittany Pierce and Santana Lopez, were promoted to series regulars, as was Mike O'Malley as Kurt's father Burt Hummel.

Supporting cast members Harry Shum, Jr. and Ashley Fink had increased roles as New Directions members Mike Chang and Lauren Zizes. Two recurring cast members from season one did not return: Dijon Talton's glee club member Matt Rutherford was written out as having transferred, and Patrick Gallagher's football coach Ken Tanaka was replaced by Dot-Marie Jones as Shannon Beiste. Returning secondary characters included Iqbal Theba as Principal Figgins, Stephen Tobolowsky as former glee club director Sandy Ryerson, Romy Rosemont as Finn's mother Carole Hudson, Max Adler as school bully Dave Karofsky and James Earl as his fellow bully Azimio, Josh Sussman as school reporter Jacob Ben Israel, Lauren Potter as cheerleader Becky Jackson, Jonathan Groff as Rachel's ex-boyfriend Jesse St. James, and Kristin Chenoweth as former glee club star April Rhodes. The season introduced several new recurring characters: Chord Overstreet was cast as transfer student Sam Evans; Darren Criss appeared as Blaine Anderson, lead singer of rival glee club the Dalton Academy Warblers; Cheyenne Jackson played Dustin Goolsby, the coach of rival glee club Vocal Adrenaline; Jake Zyrus appeared as Sunshine Corazon, a foreign exchange student from the Philippines and a rival to Rachel who ultimately joins Vocal Adrenaline; John Stamos played dentist Carl Howell, a love interest for Emma; and Gwyneth Paltrow appeared as substitute teacher Holly Holliday.

Meat Loaf and Barry Bostwick, who both starred in The Rocky Horror Picture Show, appeared in Glee's Halloween Rocky Horror tribute episode, playing right-wing television station managers and colleagues of Sue. Adam Kolkin portrayed an eight-year-old Kurt in the third episode of the season, and in the seventh episode, child actors portraying preschool-aged versions of New Directions were featured. Sue's mother Doris Sylvester was also introduced this season, played by Carol Burnett. Journalist Katie Couric made a guest appearance as herself when she interviewed Sue during "The Sue Sylvester Shuffle".

A reality series featuring open auditions for the show was intended to air on Fox in advance of the season, but was cancelled due to Murphy's desire to concentrate on the main series, and fear that the distraction of the reality show might damage Glee. The idea was picked up by Oxygen, and The Glee Project began airing in June 2011, after the end of season. The winner was to receive a multi-episode guest-starring role in Glee's third season; in the finale, all four finalists were given prizes: there were two winners of seven-episode arcs, and two runners-up who were given two episodes each.

== Music ==
Glee's second season saw a shift toward covering more Top 40 songs than the first, in an effort to appeal more to the 18–49 demographic. Having used 2010 songs such as Bruno Mars' "Just the Way You Are" and Cee Lo Green's "Forget You", music supervisor PJ Bloom commented, "We're using songs on the show the same time they're charting as new hits." He described the process behind selecting songs, clearing rights, recording, and filming numbers as taking as little as a few weeks to complete. Executive music producer Adam Anders revealed that production and planning even occurs before rights for songs are cleared, as Glee's creators are offered the opportunity to listen to upcoming songs before their release by publishers and record labels.

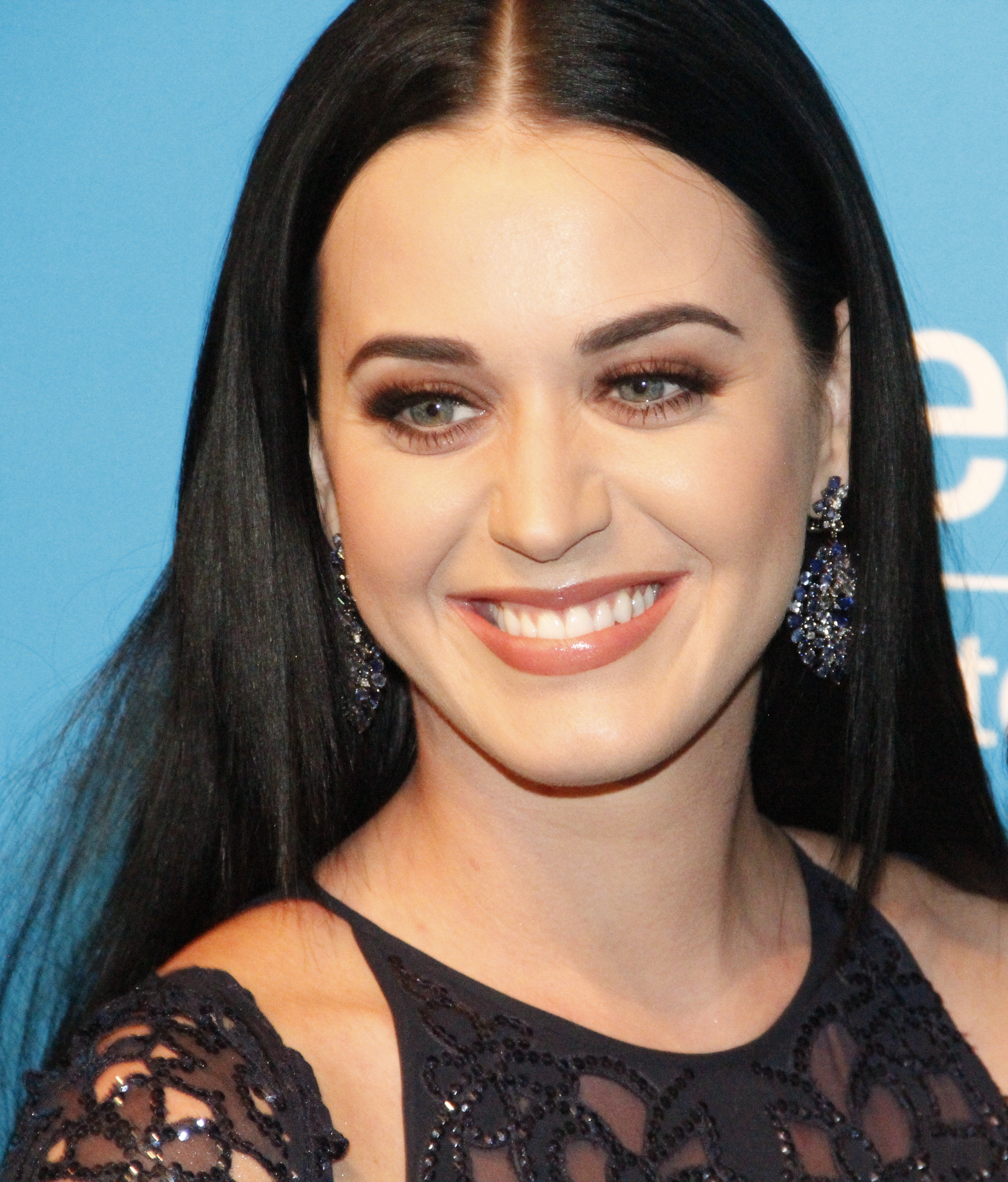
Darren Criss's rendition of "Teenage Dream" by Katy Perry (pictured) attained the highest first-day and first-week sales of any Glee song to date.

The extended play (EP) Glee: The Music, The Rocky Horror Glee Show was released mid-October 2010 to accompany the fifth episode. Glee: The Music, The Christmas Album, featuring winter holiday-themed songs, was released on November 9, 2010, and Glee: The Music, Volume 4, featuring recordings from the first half of the season, was released at the end of that month. An additional EP tied to the Super Bowl episode, when it was initially planned to also be a tribute episode, was dropped when the tribute idea was; Glee: The Music, Volume 5, which featured recordings from that Super Bowl episode through the Regionals competition episode, was released on March 8, 2011. Another soundtrack album, released on April 19, 2011, features the Dalton Academy Warblers: Glee: The Music Presents the Warblers. The final CD accompanying the season, Glee: The Music, Volume 6, was released on May 23, 2011.

Second season musical releases attained some chart success. Glee: The Music, The Rocky Horror Glee Show peaked at number six on the Billboard 200 with 48,000 copies sold. It marked the lowest debut and sales for the cast in the United States, but the highest position ever reached for a Rocky Horror album. Glee: The Music, The Christmas Album and Glee: The Music, Volume 5 both peaked at number one, in Canada and Australia respectively; the highest-charting album in the US was Glee: The Music Presents the Warblers at number two. The Christmas album was certified platinum in the US, and Glee: The Music, Volume 4 has nearly achieved double platinum certification in Australia. The cast's cover of "O Holy Night" debuted at number one on the Holiday Digital Songs chart. The highest-charting single on the Billboard Hot 100 was the cast's original song "Loser like Me" which debuted at number six. The single sold 210,000 downloads in that week, second only to the cast's cover of Katy Perry's "Teenage Dream", which sold a record 55,000 downloads on its first day and a total of 214,000 downloads its first week in the US—it became the first Glee Cast single to top Billboard's Digital Songs chart, reached number eight on the Hot 100, and it beat the previous first-week sales record of 177,000 held by debut single "Don't Stop Believin'", which had hit number four on the Hot 100. "Teenage Dream" and "Loser Like Me" were the second and third cast singles to be certified Gold in the US; the first was "Don't Stop Believin'", which subsequently received its Platinum certification during the second season.

The record for most appearances by a group on the Billboard Hot 100, previously set by The Beatles, was broken when six songs from the season's second episode, "Britney/Brittany", debuted on the chart the week of October 16, 2010, which put the Glee total at seventy-five. This feat also placed the cast third overall among all artists, behind James Brown and Elvis Presley. Four songs debuted on November 18, 2010, which pushed the number of appearances to ninety-three and surpassed Brown for second place. On February 16, 2011, it was announced that Glee had increased its Hot 100 appearances to 113 songs and moved past Elvis to hold the record for the most Hot 100 entries. Glee ended the second season with a total of 156 Hot 100 songs. The season's cover versions had a positive effect on some of the original recording artists. Following the broadcast of "Britney/Brittany", sales of the Spears songs covered increased by 35,000 units. The episode "Rumours" had an even greater effect on the Fleetwood Mac album of the same name it featured: in Australia, five days after the episode aired, the Rumours album entered the Australian charts at number two, and was at number three the following week; it received its thirteen-times Platinum certification in Australia at the end of that month.

== Reception ==
=== Critical response ===
It's been a crazy ride this season. As frustrated as I get with Glee's minute-to-minute identity crisis, there have been some truly gorgeous moments of television in the past twenty-two episodes...

— Meghan Brown
The Atlantic

The review aggregator website Rotten Tomatoes gives the season a 79% with an average rating of 7.61/10, based on 29 reviews. The site's critics consensus reads, "Glee loses some of its spark in this reprise, but the series still delights with its frothy musical numbers and sensitive engagement with pressing social issues." The season received a Metacritic score of 76 out of 100 based on 11 reviews, indicating "generally favorable" reviews.

Robert Canning of IGN wrote that the "New York" season finale "was a decent close to an enjoyable season", while The Atlantic's Meghan Brown called it "an uneven end to an uneven season", and her colleague Kevin Fallon said that season two was "undeniably frustrating" but "there was still ample reason to tune in and enjoy". Anthony Benigno of The Faster Times gave the season a "C+", but noted that he was "an easy grader". The A.V. Club's Emily St. James gave the season a slightly better "B−", and stated: "The season opened and closed strong, but the middle section was mushy and filled with plenty of episodes that just didn't work." Brett Berk of Vanity Fair summed up as follows: "The quality of Glee's second season has been something like the topography of Utah, or the acting career of Amanda Peet—blandly passable and relying on its good looks, but stumbling occasionally upon unfathomable idiosyncrasy, whose presence is at once baffling, frightening, and a bit melancholy—in a good way."

Several episodes drew complaints from advocacy groups. The Parents Television Council named "Britney/Brittany", "Blame It on the Alcohol" and "Sexy" the worst shows of their respective weeks of broadcast, due to their overt sexual content. "Sexy" was also criticized by the children's charity Kidscape for the "wholly inappropriate" inclusion of a song by convicted sex offender Gary Glitter. The Gay & Lesbian Alliance Against Defamation objected to the use of the pejorative term "tranny" in "The Rocky Horror Glee Show", and "The Substitute" was ill-received by the National Alliance on Mental Illness for its humorous depiction of bipolar disorder. Still, some critics praised the show for its even greater diversity in Season 2; Akash Nikolas at Zap2It wrote, "Yes this show is often erratically written, but what it does best is create a queer fantasia to celebrate 'otherness', with much mirth and little victim-hood. No other show on TV features a cast this diverse: people of color, sexual others, different body types, gender subversion and even the disabled."

=== Ratings ===
The season premiere episode, "Audition", aired on September 21, 2010; it averaged 12.45 million American viewers and achieved a 5.6/16 Nielsen rating/share in the 18–49 demographic. The second episode, which featured the music of Britney Spears, was also Glee's second best showing at that point after its April 2010 return after a four-month hiatus, with 13.51 million viewers and a 5.9/17 rating/share in the 18–49 demographic. All but one of the next fourteen episodes ranged in viewership between 10.51 million and 11.92 million. The exception aired on Sunday, February 6, 2011, after the Super Bowl: Glee received its highest-ever ratings. Over 26.8 million viewers watched it, with an initial peak of 39.5 million, and an overall 18–49 rating/share of 11.1/29.

When the show returned with its final six episodes on April 19, 2011, after a five-week absence, US viewership dipped below ten million, and on the special ninety-minute episode "Born This Way" reached a season low of 8.62 million, with a rating/share of 3.4/11 in the 18–49 demographic. Only for the season finale, when the show aired an hour later than usual to allow the penultimate night of American Idol to air in Glee's usual slot, did the number of watchers exceed ten million, when the lead-in helped boost viewership to 11.80 million and the 18–49 rating/share to 4.6/11.

For the season as a whole, Glee was number 43 of 268 primetime shows that averaged at least a million viewers, with an average viewership of 10.11 million, while it tied for number 13 of 249 of shows that received at least a 0.5 rating in the 18–49 rating demographic, with a 4.1 rating average.

A mid-season feature story in The Hollywood Reporter, which ran on January 25, 2011, stated that Glee had become the most-watched program of US origin in the UK.

=== Accolades ===
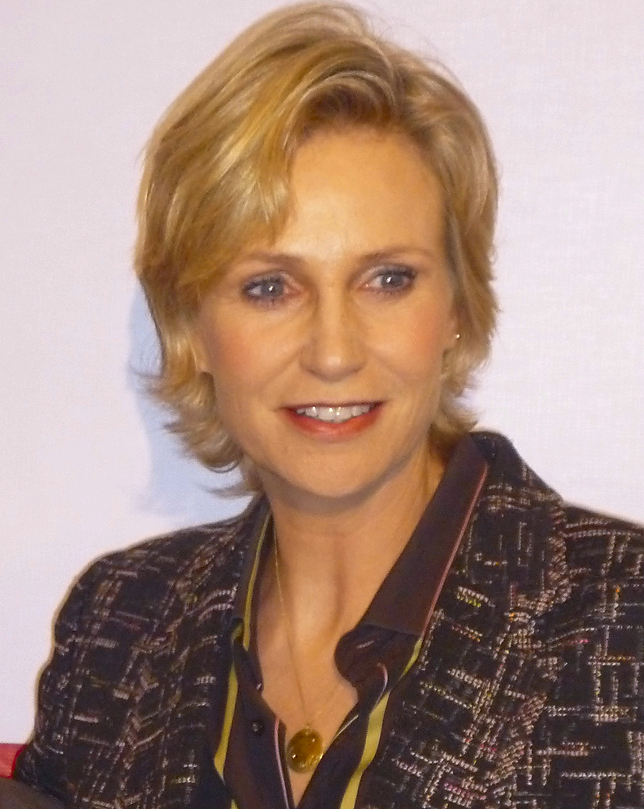
Jane Lynch (pictured) won a Dorian Award, Golden Globe Award and People's Choice Award for season two.

During its second season, Glee was nominated for forty-five awards. It won in three categories at the 68th Golden Globe Awards, from five nominations, and in two categories at the 37th People's Choice Awards, from four nominations. Its five nominations at the Satellite Awards 2010 and three at the 17th Screen Actors Guild Awards produced no wins, nor did two nominations at the NAACP Image Awards. Glee garnered nine nominations at the AfterEllen.com and AfterElton.com Visibility Awards, of which it won four. It was awarded a further four awards by the Gay and Lesbian Entertainment Critics Association at the 2011 Dorian Awards, with the TV Comedy Performance of the Year accolade resulting in a tie between Colfer and Lynch. Series producer Alexis Martin Woodall won the Television Produced By A Woman accolade at the WIN Awards, where Glee was nominated for three awards in total.

Glee was named one of the American Film Institute Television Programs of the Year at the 2010 AFI Awards, and tied with Modern Family for the Outstanding Comedy Series accolade at the 22nd GLAAD Media Awards. Series costume designer Lou Eyrich received the Outstanding Contemporary Television Series award at the Costume Designers Guild Awards 2010, and casting directors Robert J. Ulrich, Eric Dawson and Carol Kritzer won the CSA Media Access Award and for casting performers with disabilities. The series was additionally nominated in the International TV Show category at the British Academy Television Awards 2010, for International Breakthrough Act at the 2011 BRIT Awards, and in the Digital Choice category at the 2011 National Television Awards. Lynch was nominated for Comedy Actress – TV at the inaugural Comedy Awards. Brennan, Falchuk and Murphy received a Comedy Series nomination at the 2011 Writers Guild of America Awards, and they, along with Di Loreto and Kenneth Silverstein, were nominated for The Danny Thomas Award for Outstanding Producer of Episodic Television – Comedy at the Producers Guild of America Awards 2010.

== Home video releases ==
Glee: Season 2, Volume 1 contains the first ten episodes of the season. It was released as a three-disc box set on Region 1 DVD in the US and Canada on January 25, 2011, on Region 4 DVD in Australia and New Zealand on March 23, 2011, and on Region 2 DVD in the UK and Ireland on April 4, 2011. The special features include a DVD-exclusive song from "The Rocky Horror Glee Show". The final twelve episodes of the season are collected on Glee: Season 2, Volume 2, which was released in the US on September 13, 2011, and includes several special features such as "Building Glee's Auditorium" with Cory Monteith and "Shooting Glee in New York City"; Glee: The Complete Second Season was released on the same day in DVD and Blu-ray, and contains all the special features from the second season's first and second DVD volumes. The two DVDs and full-season Blu-ray were released in the UK on September 19, 2011, and in Australia on October 5, 2011. Amazon.com began taking pre-orders for the complete season box set on Blu-ray and DVD in September 2010, the week the season premiered.

Glee – Season 2, Volume 1
Set details	Special features	
10 episodes; 3-disc set; Running Time: 464 minutes; 1.77:1 aspect ratio; English; Subtitles: English, French, Spanish	Glee Music Jukebox; Getting Waxed With Jane Lynch; The Making of the Rocky Horror Glee Show; Exclusive Bonus Song; "Planet, Schmanet, Janet"; The Wit of Brittany; Glee at Comic-Con 2010	
DVD release dates
Region 1	Region 2	Region 4
January 25, 2011	April 4, 2011	March 23, 2011

Glee – Season 2, Volume 2
Set details	Special features	
12 episodes; 4-disc set; Running Time: 565 minutes; 1.77:1 aspect ratio; English; Subtitles: English, French, Spanish	Glee Music Jukebox; Building Glee's Auditorium with Cory Monteith; A Day in the Life of Brittany; Shooting Glee in New York City; Guesting on Glee; Sue's Quips; Stevie Nicks Goes Glee; Santana's Slams	
DVD release dates
Region 1	Region 2	Region 4
September 13, 2011	September 19, 2011	October 5, 2011

Glee – The Complete Second Season
Set details	Special features	
22 episodes; 7-disc set; Running Time: 1001 minutes; 1.77:1 aspect ratio; English; Subtitles: English, French, Spanish	All special features on Glee – Season 2, Volume 1; All special features on Glee – Season 2, Volume 2	
DVD release dates
Region 1	Region 2	Region 4
September 13, 2011	September 19, 2011	October 5, 2011
