= Adam Anders =

Swedish film, television and music producer

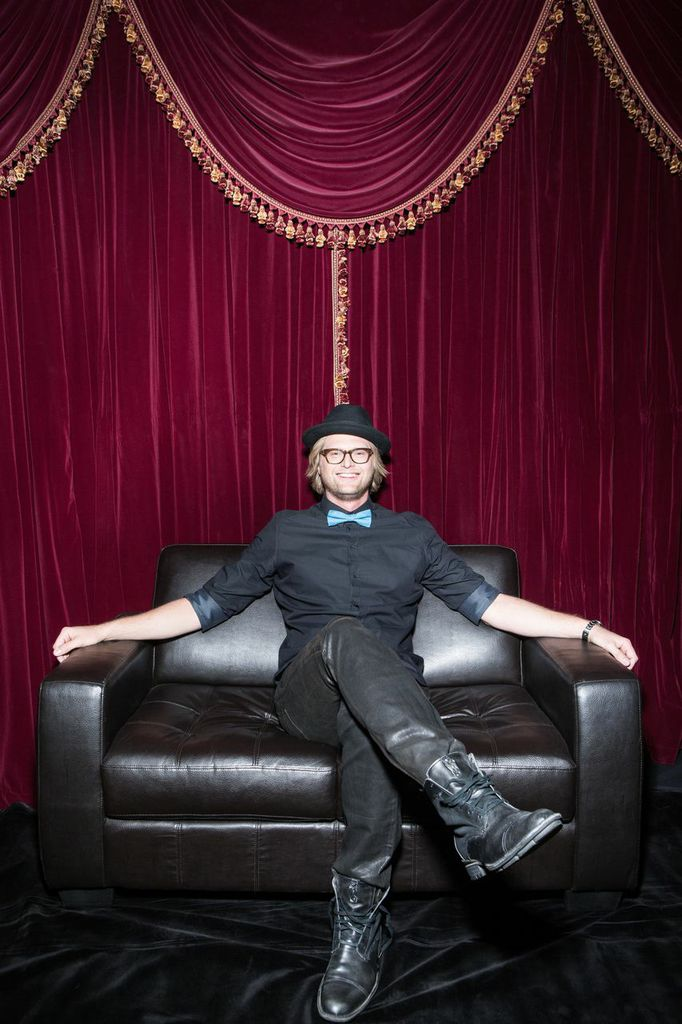

Background information
- Born: Adam Anders; October 10, 1975 (age 51); Stockholm, Sweden
- Genres: Pop, rock, dance
- Occupations: Record, Film and TV Producer, CEO of Anders Media and Deep Well Records
- Label: Deep Well Records / Capitol Music Group
- Website: andersmedia.com

Adam Anders (born October 10, 1975) is a Swedish film, television and music producer who has sold more than 100 million albums and in recent years has become one of the most in-demand executive producers for music-driven film and television. Anders is the CEO of Anders Media, and its record label Deep Well Records, a sub-label of Capitol Music Group. In 2023, Anders made his directorial debut with the film, Journey to Bethlehem, a musical retelling of The Nativity Story, co-written by Peter Barsocchini and Anders, starring Fiona Palomo, Milo Manheim, and Antonio Banderas.

In 2013, Adam was named No. 15 in Hollywood Reporter's Top 35 Hitmakers. Anders' work has earned him four Grammy Award nominations, and two People's Choice Awards. As the Executive Music Producer for Glee, Anders' musical productions have helped put Glee on the iTunes Top Songs chart, including original songs that he wrote, such as "Loser like Me" (landing at number one) and "Get It Right" (at number two).

Glee had at one time seven of the top ten tracks on the iTunes Top Song chart including the above two original songs at one and two respectively, the cast's versions of Pink's "Raise Your Glass" at number three, The Beatles' "Blackbird" at number five, Maroon 5's "Misery" at number six, and another original song, "Hell to the No", at number eight. In May 2011, Glee had one of its biggest sales weeks to date with 986,000 downloads of tracks produced by Anders.

Anders has a track record of writing and producing music for both established artists and up-and-comers including the Jonas Brothers, Miley Cyrus, Selena Gomez, Backstreet Boys, Clay Aiken and many others. His music can also be heard on many major motion pictures and television shows including Disney's High School Musical 3, Hannah Montana, Evan Almighty and The Wedding Planner, as well as the 2012 film Rock of Ages.

Adam Anders launched Los Angeles–based record label, Deep Well Records in 2011. The first artist signed to his label was singer/songwriter/actor Shane Harper, whose self-titled debut album was released on February 14, 2012, and included the Anders-produced first single entitled, "One Step Closer".

In addition, he runs Anders Media, Inc., a production company that specializes in developing original music-driven content for major film studios and TV networks. Anders recently moved his label Deep Well Records to the Capitol Music Group, and is a consultant for Virgin Records. In October 2015, Anders co-produced "Hollow" by Tori Kelly, which was the featured single on her deluxe edition album, Unbreakable Smile. The song was co-written by several songwriters signed to the Anders-owned publishing company of the same brand, Deep Well Music Publishing. In 2016, Anders added film and TV producing credits as an executive producer for the US version of The Passion. It aired on Palm Sunday, March 20, 2016 on FOX. Anders will also executive produce the soundtrack and act as producer for ABC's remake of Dirty Dancing.

== Early life ==
Adam Anders was born in Stockholm, Sweden. Both his parents were professional musicians, traveling and playing all over the world; often bringing their children with them wherever they went. This exposed Adam to a variety of musical and cultural differences at a very early age. Despite being classically trained Gospel performers, both his mother and father encouraged him to listen and take influences from all musical styles, from Rock 'n' Roll to Soul.

Anders formed his first band at the age of 10, together with his brother and sister and toured Europe with him playing bass. The family later moved to the US, moving around the West Coast. Due to all the traveling, Adam was homeschooled after 5th grade. Due to music being the core of his whole life, Anders became such a prominent bass player that the University of South Florida accepted him to the Jazz program at the early age of 13. They declared him a prodigy and he was allowed full credit for taking the college music classes.

After graduating at the age of 16, Anders decided to live with his brother in Nashville, Tennessee. He worked night shifts and played music during the day. After six months, he got a position as a bass player for the Christian singer-songwriter Steven Curtis Chapman, allowing him to solely focus on music as a career. After remaining on several major tours, making money to buy more studio equipment, Anders felt that songwriting and producing gave greater satisfaction and decided to transition to studio work.

== Career ==
=== Early years ===
Adam Anders began his professional career primarily writing and producing songs for both established artists and up-and-comers. Anders co-wrote the Backstreet Boys hit "More Than That" and Steven Curtis Chapman's "Nobody Ever." Anders then worked closely with Disney producing music for major motion pictures and television shows including Camp Rock and Camp Rock 2, Hannah Montana and Sonny With a Chance. During this time, he collaborated with pop-singers Jesse McCartney, Clay Aiken, Nick Lachey, Ashley Tisdale, and the Jonas Brothers. In 2007 and 2008, Anders' music could be heard in Disney's High School Musical 3 and Universal's Evan Almighty.

=== Journey to Bethlehem and directorial debut ===
In 2023, Anders makes his directorial debut with the holiday pop musical, Journey to Bethlehem, starring Fiona Palomo as Mary, Milo Manheim as Joseph, and Antonio Banderas as King Herod. "This live-action Christmas musical celebration for the entire family, weaves classic Christmas melodies into new pop songs in a music-infused retelling of the timeless story of Mary and Joseph and the birth of Jesus." Anders co-wrote the script with Peter Barsocchini, who is best known for writing the High School Musical series. The film released on November 10, 2023, and features music written and produced by Adam Anders, Peer Astrom, and Nikki Anders.

=== Glee and other projects ===
Glee

In 2009, Anders began producing music for FOX's hit television show Glee. Producing the popular Glee anthem "Don't Stop Believin" was the first of many contributions to the show. One year later, Anders was made Executive Music Producer for the musical comedy television show. The producer penned Glee's first two original songs, "Loser Like Me" and "Get It Right". Throughout his time on the show, he wrote a total of seven original songs and produced all sixteen of the Glee albums. Glee had at one time seven of the top ten tracks on the iTunes Top Song chart including the above two original songs at one and two respectively, the cast's versions of Pink's "Raise Your Glass" at number three, The Beatles' "Blackbird" at number five, Maroon 5's "Misery" at number six, and another original song, "Hell to the No", at number eight. In May 2011, Glee hit a sales week high with 986,000 downloads of tracks produced by Anders.

Other projects

During his time on Glee, Anders also launched his Los Angeles–based record label, Deep Well Records. The first artist signed to his label was singer/songwriter/actor Shane Harper, whose self-titled debut album was released on February 14, 2012 and included the Anders-produced first single entitled, "One Step Closer". In 2012, Anders produced music for motion pictures including New Year's Eve and Rock of Ages, as well as producing CeeLo Green's album CeeLo's Magic Moment, writing "All I Need is Love".

=== Since 2014 ===
Following his time on Glee, Anders moved onto working with FX's horror television series American Horror Story. In 2015, he was a music producer for the Disney movie, Descendants. The album went #1 on iTunes and included an original song by Anders and his team.

In addition, he runs Anders Media, Inc., a production company that specializes in developing original music-driven content for major film studios and TV networks. Anders recently moved his label Deep Well Records to the Capitol Music Group, and is a consultant for Virgin Records.

In October 2015, Anders co-produced "Hollow" by Tori Kelly, which was the featured single on her deluxe edition album, Unbreakable Smile. The song was co-written by several songwriters signed to the Anders-owned publishing company of the same brand, Deep Well Music Publishing.

Film and television production

In 2016, Anders executive produced and arranged music for The Passion on FOX, which aired on Palm Sunday, March 20, 2016. In 2017, Anders produced ABC's anticipated remake of Dirty Dancing starring Abigail Breslin, in addition to executive producing its soundtrack.

Captain Underpants: The First Epic Movie

Anders worked as the Executive Song Producer and Soundtrack album Producer for DreamWorks' Captain Underpants: The First Epic Movie based on the series of children's novels of the same name by Dav Pilkey. Anders, with longtime collaborator Peer Astrom, produced the eleven-song album. The soundtrack included artists such as Adam Lambert, Lil Yachty, Andy Grammer, Weird Al Yankovic on the film's theme song and original score by Theodore Shapiro (Ghostbusters, The Devil Wears Prada, Marley & Me).

MundoNick's Kally's Mashup

In 2017, Anders Media aired its inaugural international program Kally's Mashup on Nickelodeon (Latin America). Anders serves as Co-Creator, Executive Producer and Executive Soundtrack Producer alongside Nikki Anders and Peer Astrom. In May 2018, Kally's Mashup was renewed for a second season, following the wide success of the first season.

Monarch In 2021, Anders joined the Fox country music drama series Monarch as the show's music supervisor and wrote and produced several songs for the first season, which premiered on September 11, 2022.

== Awards and nominations ==
=== Grammy Awards ===
Year	Nominee / work	Award	Result
2011	Glee: The Music, Volume 1	Best Compilation Soundtrack for Visual Media	Nominated
2012	Glee: The Music, Volume 4	Best Compilation Soundtrack for Visual Media	Nominated
2013	Rock of Ages (2012 film) Soundtrack	Best Compilation Soundtrack for Visual Media	Nominated
2014	Cee Lo's Magic Moment (with Cee Lo Green)	Best Traditional Pop Vocal Album	Nominated

=== Golden Globe Awards ===
Year	Nominee / work	Award	Result
2010	Glee	Best Musical or Comedy	Won
2011	Glee	Best Musical or Comedy	Won

=== ARIA Awards ===
Year	Nominee / work	Award	Result
2010	Wrapped Up Good (with The McClymonts)	Best Country Album	Won

=== People's Choice Awards ===
Year	Nominee / work	Award	Result
2010	Glee	Favorite New TV Comedy	Won
2011	Glee	Favorite TV Comedy	Won

== Filmography ==
=== Television ===
Title	Credit	Year
The Passion	Executive Producer	2016
Dirty Dancing	Producer	2016
Kally's MashUp	Creator/Executive Producer	2017

=== Film ===
Year	Title	Director	Writer	Producer	Notes
2023	Journey to Bethlehem	Yes	Yes	Yes	Also Music

== Discography ==
=== Feature films ===
Title	Producer / Writer / Performer	Year
Captain Underpants: The First Epic Movie	Executive Song Producer	2017
Rock of Ages	Producer	2012
New Year's Eve (New Line Cinema) "Auld Lang Syne"	Producer	2012
Hannah Montana: The Movie (Disney) "Hoedown Throwdown"	Writer/Producer	2012
The Young Victoria "Only You"	Writer	2009
High School Musical 3 (Disney) "Can I Have This Dance"	Writer/Producer	2008
Evan Almighty (Universal) "Be The Miracle"	Producer	2007
The Wedding Planner (Columbia) "Adore You"	Producer/Writer	2001
Rugrats in Paris (Paramount) "When You Love"	Producer/Writer	2000

=== Movies for television ===
Title	Producer / Writer / Performer	Year
The Cheetah Girls: One World (Disney) "No Place Like Us"	Producer/Writer	2008
Camp Rock (Disney) "2 Stars"	Producer/Writer	2008
Princess (ABC Family) "Roots Before Branches"	Producer/Writer	2008
Camp Rock 2: The Final Jam "Wouldn't Change a Thing"	Producer/Writer	2010
Starstruck (Disney) "Hero"	Producer/Writer	2010
Son of God (History)	Producer/Writer	2014
Descendants (Disney) "If Only"	Producer/Writer	2015
Dirty Dancing (ABC)	Producer	2017

=== Television ===
Title	Producer / Writer / Performer	Year
Dawson's Creek "Any Lucky Penny"	Producer	2004
Fashion House "Theme Song"	Producer / Writer	2006
K-Ville "Theme Song"	Producer / Writer	2007
Wedding Bells "Theme Song"	Producer / Writer	2007
Back To You "Theme Song"	Producer / Writer	2007
"Don't Stop Believin'" (Glee song)	Producer	2009
Glee: The Music, Volume 1	Producer	2009
Glee: The Music, Volume 2	Producer	2009
Disney's Friends for Change "Send It On (song)"	Producer / Writer	2009
Hannah Montana Forever	Producer / Writer	2010
Jonas Brothers Jonas (Disney) "Fall"	Producer / Writer	2010
Jonas Brothers Jonas (Disney) "Invisible"	Producer / Writer	2010
Demi Lovato "Sonny With a Chance Theme"	Writer	2010
Glee: The Music, The Power of Madonna	Producer	2010
Glee: The Music, Volume 3 Showstoppers	Producer	2010
Glee: The Music, Journey to Regionals	Producer	2010
Glee: The Music, The Rocky Horror Glee Show	Producer	2010
Glee: The Music, The Christmas Album	Producer	2010
Glee: The Music, Volume 4	Producer	2010
"Get It Right" (Glee song)	Producer / Writer	2011
"Loser like Me" (Glee song)	Producer / Writer	2011
Glee: The Music, Volume 5	Producer	2011
Glee: The Music Presents the Warblers	Producer	2011
"As Long As You're There" (Glee song)	Producer / Writer	2011
"Pretending" (Glee song)	Producer / Writer	2011
"Light Up the World" (Glee song)	Producer / Writer	2011
Glee: The Music, Volume 6	Producer	2011
Extraordinary Merry Christmas (Glee song)	Producer / Writer	2011
"Christmas Eve with You" (Glee song)	Producer / Writer	2011
Glee: The Music, The Christmas Album	Producer	2011
Glee: The Music, Volume 7	Producer	2011
Glee: The Music, The Graduation Album	Producer	2012
Glee (TV Series)	Producer	2009 - 2012
Glee Sings the Beatles	Producer	2013
The Quarterback (Music From the TV Series)	Producer	2013
Glee (TV Series)	Executive Music Producer	2010 - 2014
American Horror Story "Edward Mordrake: Part 1"	Producer	2014
American Horror Story "Edward Mordrake: Part 2"	Producer	2014
American Horror Story "Pink Cupcakes"	Producer	2014
American Horror Story "Bullseye"	Producer	2014
American Horror Story "Blood Bath"	Producer	2014
American Horror Story "Tupperware Party Massacre"	Producer	2014
American Horror Story "Curtain Call"	Producer	2015
The Passion	Executive Producer	2016
Kally's Mashup, La Música Vol.1	Executive Producer / Executive Music Producer	2017-2018
Kally's Mashup, La Música Vol.2	Executive Producer / Executive Music Producer	2018
Monarch	Music supervisor	2022–present

== Albums/songs ==
Artist	Title	Album	Producer / Writer	Year
Porcelain Black	"Rock Angels"	Mannequin Factory	Writer	2012
CeeLo Green	"All I Need Is Love (feat. The Muppets)"	CeeLo's Magic Moment	Writer	2012
CeeLo Green	-	CeeLo's Magic Moment	Album Producer	2012
The McClymonts	"If You're Going to Love Me"	Wrapped Up Good	Producer / Writer	2011
Ashley Tisdale	"Blame It on the Beat"	-	Producer / Writer	2009
Backstreet Boys	"Unmistakable"	Unbreakable	Producer/Writer	2007
Ashley Tisdale	"Don't Touch"	Headstrong	Producer / Writer	2007
Shannon Noll	"Crashing Down"	Turn It Up	Writer	2007
Shannon Noll	"Is You"	Turn It Up	Writer	2007
The McClymonts	"My Life Again"	Chaos and Bright Lights	Album Producer	2007
The McClymonts	"Favorite Boyfriend of the Year"	Chaos and Bright Lights	Album Producer	2007
The McClymonts	"Til' You Love Me"	Chaos and Bright Lights	Album Producer	2007
The McClymonts	"Save Yourself"	Chaos and Bright Lights	Album Producer	2007
Kimberley Locke	"Any Which Way'"	Based on a True Story	Producer / Writer	2007
Nick Lachey	"Don't Shut Me Out"	What's Left of Me	Producer / Writer	2006
Nick Lachey	"Did I Ever Tell You"	What's Left of Me	Producer / Writer	2006
Clay Aiken	"Here You Come Again"	A Thousand Different Ways	Producer	2006
Clay Aiken	"Everytime You Go Away"	A Thousand Different Ways	Producer	2006
CeCe Winans	"Purified'"	Pray	Producer / Remixer	2005
Jesse McCartney	"Without You"	Beautiful Soul	Writer	2004
Billy Crawford	"Trackin'"	Ride	Writer	2002
Ace of Base	"Unspeakable'"	Da Capo	Writer	2002
CeCe Winans	"CeCe Winans'"	For Love Alone	Producer / Writer	2001
Backstreet Boys	"More Than That"	Black & Blue	Writer	2000
Backstreet Boys	"More Than That"	The Hits, Chapter 1	Writer	2000
Steven Curtis Chapman	"Nobody Ever"	Jesus (Soundtrack)	Producer	2000
Steven Curtis Chapman	"Next Five Minutes'"	Speechless	Producer / Writer	1999
