= Loser like Me (song) =

2011 single by the cast of Glee

Single by Glee cast

from the album Glee: The Music, Volume 5
- Released: March 1, 2011
- Genre: Dance-pop
- Length: 3:19
- Label: Columbia
- Songwriters: Adam Anders; Peer Åström; Savan Kotecha; Max Martin; Shellback
- Producers: Max Martin; Shellback; Peer Åström; Adam Anders

Glee cast singles chronology
"Get It Right" (2011)	"Loser like Me" (2011)	"Light Up the World" (2011)

"Loser like Me" is an original song performed by the cast of American television series Glee, taken from their sixth soundtrack album, Glee: The Music, Volume 5. The song was written and produced by Adam Anders, Max Martin, and Peer Åström, and Shellback, with additional songwriting credit from Savan Kotecha. The song, with another track "Get It Right", were the first two original songs to be featured on the show. The song is their first official single, being sent to US radio on March 1, 2011. In order for the song to have radio appeal, Anders recruited Martin to produce "Loser like Me" while he was in the United States working on Britney Spears' Femme Fatale.

Lea Michele and Cory Monteith front the song, with Michele providing lead vocals in the chorus and a verse, and Monteith having a verse. Other cast members provide vocals in the chorus and in a rap breakdown. Naya Rivera and Heather Morris have some spoken words and some solo work during the chorus. Musically, the song is a dance-pop song, and it features a "pop funk" guitar. The production drew comparisons to similar Max Martin productions released at the time, notably Pink's "Raise Your Glass" (2010). Lyrically, it follows in the footsteps of previous self-empowerment anthems released around the same time, with the incorporation of lines about revenge fantasies.

Critics generally praised the song in Glee's first step at original music, including its production, lyrics, and Michele's vocals. However, common criticisms were that the song sounded like a cover of another song, and that it would have been better suited for other artists Martin usually works with, such as Pink or Avril Lavigne. The song debuted at number six on the US Billboard Hot 100 and became the cast's third top-ten hit to date. It reached number thirty-six on the US Adult Pop Songs chart, becoming their first song other than a Christmas song to appear on an airplay chart. Internationally, it reached the top thirty in at least five other markets. The song's performance was featured in the Glee episode "Original Song" which first aired on March 15, 2011, and included choreography and the group throwing confetti from slushie cups at the audience. The song was redone by Jenna Ushkowitz, Kevin McHale, Darren Criss and Chord Overstreet in the second part of Glee's two-part 100th episode, "New Directions", which aired on March 25, 2014.

== Background ==
"He owns radio right now. He's had, like, seven No. 1s in the last year, and so if we wanna go to radio with anybody tagging along, I think he's the guy you want. We've done like 30 of his songs on Glee".

— Adam Anders on recruiting Max Martin to produce "Loser like Me"

On February 23, 2011, it was announced that Glee, for the first time, would feature two original songs, entitled "Loser like Me" and "Get It Right" on their March 15, 2011 episode. The series' music producer, Adam Anders, called the song a "Gleek anthem," and it was "a very uptempo, kind-of-summery hit". It was also revealed that pop music producer, Max Martin, known for his work with Britney Spears, among other singers, would produce "Loser like Me". Tim Stack of Entertainment Weekly called this a "major pop music coup" by Glee. Anders also went on to comment, "The thing about Max is that he's a huge fan of pop culture and he just loved the idea of being part of something that's such a cultural phenomenon. So it was actually not hard to convince him at all. He was all about it."

According to Anders, the Swedish-based Martin was in the United States at the time working on Spears' then-new record, and then was "exposed to exactly how enormous [Glee] is". According to the American Society of Composers, Authors and Publishers database, co-writers on the song include Anders, Peer Åström, Savan Kotecha, and Johan Schuster. "Loser like Me" and "Get It Right" both premiered on On Air with Ryan Seacrest on February 25, 2011, and were performed in the episode "Original Song", on March 15, 2011. The song was also released on iTunes in the United States on March 15, 2011.

=== Radio impact ===
"Loser like Me" became the first radio single for Glee, and was sent to radio on March 1, 2011 for mainstream and Hot AC stations. Pete Cosenza, senior vice president of promotion and adult formats for Columbia Records told Billboard,

We've promoted Glee music to radio for the past couple of years and week-by-week, programmers have embraced the show and its music more and more. (Adult radio) has created weekly, and, in some cases, daily, features, and played snippets of songs. Now, more have put "Loser like Me" into regular rotation. Glee is one of the biggest shows on television and it's a music show. What a win for us and radio.

Barb Richards, director of music for WAJI said that the cast's introduction of new music prompted the station to finally add music from the cast. Richards referenced the 21.9 million downloads and 5.2 million albums sold since the series since its May 2009 premiere, but commented, "Still, I believe that people want to hear originals over remakes, so up until the 'Glee' cast's original music it didn't make sense for us to play each latest cover, other than to spotlight it the day of the show." However, Richards complimented the original "Loser like Me" saying its lyrics would "resonate with kids and parents" and said that she liked it when she first heard it and when she saw it on the show. She also commented that it "is good on its own, and having the Glee name on it gives it a leg up". Dave McKay, program director at WPST also echoed Richards' sentiments that the Glee sales were reason to add them to airplay, adding "Not many artists or songs enjoy the type of exposure that 'Glee' provides. Plus, the audience that watches the show is the audience we target, so the fit seems perfect [...] since 'Glee' music sells, there is definitely an appetite for it."

Responding to the song being an original as opposed to their traditional covers, McKay said, "If 'Loser Like Me' were a bad song, then it wouldn't matter whether it was original or a cover: we wouldn't be playing it. That the song is good, and that it has the 'Glee' reach, makes it an easy song to play." Keith Kennedy, program director at WKDD said the single made him ponder why they haven't played Glee songs prior to "Loser Like Me". Kennedy said, "How many times have you heard radio programmers claim that they use sales numbers to shape their stations' playlists? Look at iTunes every Wednesday: Glee often dominates the top 10." Kennedy's station, WKDD, holds a "Glee O'clock" segment daily and he said "While some of the remakes have leaned toward show tunes, several probably should have received more airplay."

== Composition ==
"Loser like Me"
A sample of "Loser like Me" featuring lead vocals from Lea Michele and showing the "pop funk" guitars, and a style similar to previous Max Martin productions.

"Loser like Me" is a song that features "pop-funk chicken-scratch guitars," and according to Jody Rosen of Rolling Stone, a hopped-up beat. The song is fronted by Lea Michele singing lead on the chorus, pre-chorus, and the first verse, with Cory Monteith providing the second verse. Other Glee cast members back the two up the chorus and a rap breakdown led by Heather Morris and Naya Rivera. It bears resemblance to then-recent Max Martin-produced singles, particularly "Raise Your Glass", which contains a similar guitar-intro. Robert Copsey of Digital Spy even called "Loser Like Me" a sequel to "Raise Your Glass".

After the guitar riffs, Michele sings about becoming a future superstar, "Yeah, you may think that I'm a zero/ But hey, everyone you wanna be/ Probably started off like me". Jason Lipshutz of Billboard said "Loser Like Me" is "a sunny pop track that finds Lea Michele and Cory Monteith railing against conformity and celebrating their individuality in their verses". Other cast member lyrics include the lyric "You may think I'm a freak show", responded to by Naya Rivera with the spoken "I don't care". The song features self-empowerment lyrics which revolve around revenge fantasies, such as in Monteith's lines - "I could be a superstar / I'll see you when you wash my car". According to Melinda Newman of HitFix the song is about "being a loser now, but turning in to a winner now who never, ever looks back". Aly Semigran of MTV News said the lyrics of the "peppy pop ditty" keep "in tune with the themes of the show".

== Critical reception ==
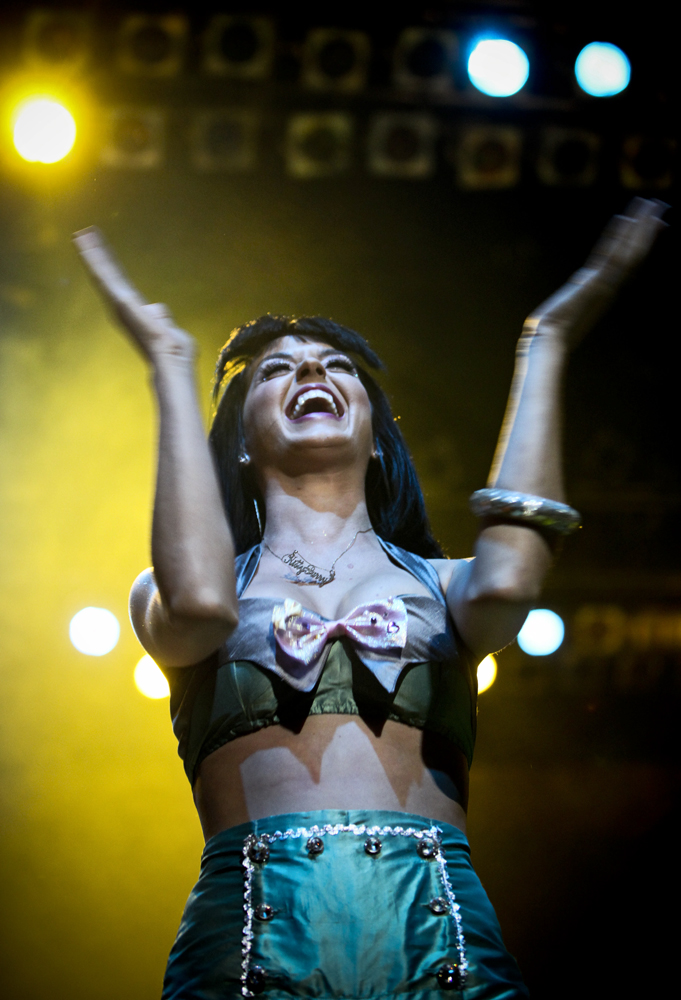
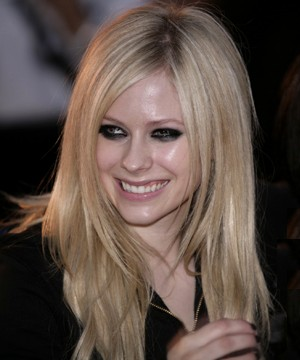
Critics compared "Loser like Me" to songs by common Max Martin collaborators such as Katy Perry (left) and Avril Lavigne (right)

Jody Rosen of Rolling Stone gave the song four out of five stars, and called it "predictably fizzy" and "fiendishly catchy". Rosen also said that the "lyric, belted out with bright-sided earnestness by Lea Michele and Cory Monteith, distills the show's theme: the mystical power of a good tune and a well-choreographed jazz hands routine to turn geeks into gods". Robert Copsey of Digital Spy wrote, "Max Martin and Shellback chuck the Pinks, Keshas and Katy Perrys into the kitchen sink and add a generous coat of gloss and shimmer (and Auto-Tune) to create what is ultimately an audacious, unabashed and, crucially, authentic pop stomper that remains true to what Glee is all about". Melinda Newman of HitFix liked the song, but said that it could have had "more of an edge". Newman also said, "For any kid who’s ever been bullied or adult who remembers being bullied, it's a bulls-eye." Newman wrote that Michele, who opens the song, had a "classic voice" but it had no "grit" to it, and recommended that Pink cover it. Becky Bain of Idolator said that the song could have been a track for Pink or Avril Lavigne, two common artists who work with Martin. Bain said the song fit in with "Raise Your Glass", and better yet, Kesha's "We R Who We R". Christopher Rosen of Movieline said the song had "total home run potential", and that it "sounds like a blend of Pink, Katy Perry, Avril Lavigne, early Mandy Moore, and Kidz Bop. And that’s a good thing!" On the point that the song sounds like a cover itself, Rosen asked, "who wants to listen to an original song on a television show that relies on covers unless it sounds like a cover itself?"

Upon first listen, Kirsten Coachman of the Seattle Post-Intelligencer said that she was "semi-horrified" at the song, but since it was a Max Martin-produced track she "gave it another chance", and commented: "It’s definitely a Max Martin song. It has a good beat and cheesy, yet catchy lyrics." However, Coachman said that the song should have been sung by Mark Salling (Puck) and Jenna Ushkowitz (Tina) rather than Monteith and Michele. Coachman liked the fact that this song and "Get It Right" fit in with the episode, and wrote, "I think both songs are pretty good anthems, and hopefully they do speak to the audience. She stated, however, that she "probably won’t be singing along to them in my car anytime soon". In an album review giving Glee: The Music, Vol. 5 a total of two out of five stars, Andrew Leahey of Allmusic said that the new Glee songs "aren’t good enough to make much of a difference". Brett Berk of Vanity Fair gave the song four stars for its lyrics, but said that the tune "sucked".

== Chart performance ==
On the week ending March 26, 2011, "Loser like Me" debuted at number six on the US Billboard Hot 100 selling 210,000 downloads in its first week. The debut was the cast's largest sales frame since their cover of Katy Perry's "Teenage Dream", which sold 214,000 downloads. The song became their third and last top-ten US hit, following "Teenage Dream", which debuted at number eight, and their first cover, "Don't Stop Believin'", which debuted at number four. For the week ending April 9, 2011, the song debuted on the US Adult Pop Songs chart at number thirty-seven. "Loser like Me" became the first entry on the Adult Pop chart, and became their first song to appear on an airplay chart since a string of Christmas songs from Glee: The Music, The Christmas Album charted on the Adult Contemporary Songs chart in 2009 and 2010. "Loser like Me" remains the fourth best-selling recording in the history of the show, having sold 617,000 copies in the United States. Outside the United States, the song appeared on several other charts worldwide, debuting at number nine on the Canadian Hot 100, as well as appearing at number fifteen on the Australian Singles Chart, number twenty-five on the Irish Singles Chart, and number twenty-seven on the UK Singles Chart.

== Glee performance ==
"Original Song" first aired on March 15, 2011, and is the sixteenth episode of the second season of the television series. The episode's plot revolves around McKinley High's glee club, New Directions, decides to prepare original songs for the Regionals competition. In order to do better in the competition, due to Rachel Berry (Lea Michele)'s assistance the group decided to sing original songs. "Loser Like Me" falls in line after Rachel performs her solo ballad "Get It Right". In the performance the Glee club girls donned light-blue dresses tied with black ribbons, black leggings, and black boots. The guys wore black dress shirts and slacks with black ties. During the performance, the group performs sectional and group choreography. Midway, it is received by a standing ovation led by Kurt (Chris Colfer). The performance ends with the club throwing slushie cups filled with confetti at the audience, alluding to the numerous slushie cups taken in the face by them earlier in the show.

Bobby Hankinson of Houston Chronicle said "It's fun and summery and it's all capped off with a confetti slushee attack to the crowd. Loved it." Erica Futterman of Rolling Stone wrote, "It's a true anthem, and it ends triumphantly, with the New Directions tossing confetti-filled Slushie cups into the crowd—and then going on to win regionals." Brett Berk of Vanity Fair noted that "the lovable dorks sing about being the lovable dorks we fell in love with (even if we often no longer recognize them as such)".

== Charts ==
Chart (2011)	Peak position
Australia (ARIA)	15
Canada Hot 100 (Billboard)	9
Ireland (IRMA)	23
New Zealand (Recorded Music NZ)	28
Scotland Singles (OCC)	21
UK Singles (OCC)	27
US Billboard Hot 100	6
US Adult Pop Songs (Billboard)	36

== Certifications ==
Region	Certification	Certified units/sales
United States (RIAA)	Gold	617,000

== Release history ==
Release dates and formats for "Loser like Me"
Region	Date	Format	Label(s)	Ref.
United States	March 1, 2011	Mainstream airplay	Columbia	

== See also ==
- List of Billboard Hot 100 top 10 singles in 2011
