= Glee: The Music, Volume 5 =

Soundtrack album by Glee Cast
- Released: March 8, 2011
- Genres: Pop, rock
- Length: 57:13
- Label: Columbia / 20th Century Fox TV
- Producers: Dante Di Loreto (exec.), Brad Falchuk (exec.), Adam Anders, Peer Åström, Max Martin, Ryan Murphy, Shellback

Glee Cast chronology
Glee: The Music, Volume 4 (2010)	Glee: The Music, Volume 5 (2011)	Glee: The Music Presents the Warblers (2011)

Singles from Glee: The Music, Volume 5
- 1. "Loser like Me" Released: March 1, 2011

Glee: The Music, Volume 5 is the sixth soundtrack album by the cast of the musical television series Glee. Released on March 8, 2011, by Columbia Records, it was produced executively by Dante Di Loreto and Brad Falchuk. In addition to 14 cover versions from its second season, the album contains two of the series' first original songs. The first of these, "Get It Right", was composed specifically for cast member Lea Michele, and the other, "Loser like Me", is a group number written with the Swedish songwriter Max Martin. All of its tracks have been released as singles, and have managed to place on several national record charts.

== Background ==
The album features music starting from Glee's post-Super Bowl episode. American actress Gwyneth Paltrow, who made an appearance in an earlier episode covering Cee Lo Green's "Forget You!", returns for three additional songs. Glee: The Music, Volume 5, announced in a press release on February 22, 2011, features the series' first original songs. "Loser like Me" is performed by the main glee club New Directions, with Lea Michele and Cory Monteith, as Rachel Berry and Finn Hudson, on lead vocals. Described by Glee music supervisor Adam Anders as "a very uptempo, kind-of-summery hit", the song was co-written with Swedish music songwriter and producer Max Martin, known for his work with many pop artists. Having covered many of Martin's co-written songs on the series, including songs by Britney Spears and Kelly Clarkson, Anders felt it was appropriate to have his involvement. According to the American Society of Composers, Authors and Publishers database, co-writers on the song include Anders, Peer Åström, Savan Kotecha, and Johan Schuster. The second song, "Get It Right", is a ballad specifically inspired by and composed for Michele by Anders, his writing partner, and his wife. Both songs premiered on Ryan Seacrest's radio program on February 25, 2011, and were performed in the episode "Original Song", on March 15, 2011. "Loser like Me" also saw a radio release date—March 1, 2011 for pop and adult pop stations.

== Reception ==
Allmusic's Andrew Leahey gave the album a rating of two-and-a-half stars out of five, praising the first track, "Thriller / Heads Will Roll", as well as Paltrow's appearances. However, he found monotony in Glee's conventional mix of popular music and show tunes, even with the two original tracks. Rolling Stone's Jody Rosen gave "Loser like Me" a four-star rating out of five, and felt its message related well to the show's theme. While initial sales projections were set at 75,000 copies, Glee: The Music, Volume 5 sold 90,000 copies in the US, debuting at number three on the Billboard 200. The album debuted on the New Zealand Albums Chart at number thirty-five and climbed to number three the next week. On the Australian Albums Chart, Volume 5 debuted at number one, becoming the second album by the cast to reach the top spot, following Glee: The Music, Volume 3 Showstoppers. In Canada, the album debuted at No. 3 on the Canadian Albums Chart, selling 5,700 copies in its second week of release. The album debuted in Ireland on April 14, 2011, at number five.

== Singles ==
All songs from the album have been released as singles, available for digital download. "Thriller / Heads Will Roll" has charted highest in Australia, at number 17, while the Glee Cast original "Loser like Me" charted highest in the United States and Canada, at number 6 and 9, respectively. Two tracks on the album have charted higher on the Billboard Hot 100 than the original versions. The cast's cover of My Chemical Romance's "Sing" charted at number 49 while the original reached number 58, and "Take Me or Leave Me" from the musical Rent charted at number 51 while the version from its 2005 film adaptation failed to chart on the Hot 100, bubbling instead at number 25.

== Track listing ==
Unless otherwise indicated, Information is based on Liner Notes

No.	Title	Writer(s)	Version covered	Length
1.	"Thriller / Heads Will Roll"	Rod Temperton / Brian Chase, Karen Orzolek, Nick Zinner	Michael Jackson / Yeah Yeah Yeahs	3:36
2.	"Need You Now"	Charles Kelley, Hillary Scott, Dave Haywood, Josh Kear	Lady Antebellum	3:37
3.	"She's Not There"	Rod Argent	The Zombies	2:28
4.	"Fat Bottomed Girls"	Brian May	Queen	4:12
5.	"P.Y.T. (Pretty Young Thing)"	James Ingram, Quincy Jones	Michael Jackson	3:56
6.	"Firework"	Tor Hermansen, Mikkel Eriksen, Katy Perry, Ester Dean, Sandy Wilheim	Katy Perry (Samples Instrumental track of version covered with added synthesizers)	3:47
7.	"Baby"	Christopher Bridges, Christine Flores, Christopher Stewart, Terius Nash, Justin Bieber	Justin Bieber featuring Ludacris	3:35
8.	"Somebody to Love"	Heather Bright, Ray Romulus, Jeremy Reeves, Jonathan Yip, Bieber	Justin Bieber	3:10
9.	"Take Me or Leave Me"	Jonathan Larson	Idina Menzel and Fredi Walker from the musical Rent	3:11
10.	"Sing"	My Chemical Romance	My Chemical Romance	4:03
11.	"Don't You Want Me"	Philip Oakey, Jo Callis, Philip Adrian Wright	The Human League	3:33
12.	"Do You Wanna Touch Me (Oh Yeah)" (featuring Gwyneth Paltrow)	Gary Glitter, Mike Leander	Joan Jett	3:36
13.	"Kiss" (featuring Gwyneth Paltrow)	Prince	Prince and The Revolution	3:37
14.	"Landslide" (featuring Gwyneth Paltrow)	Stevie Nicks	Fleetwood Mac	3:46
15.	"Get It Right"	Adam Anders, Nikki Hassman, Peer Åström	Original composition	3:47
16.	"Loser like Me"	Anders, Åström, Savan Kotecha, Max Martin, Shellback	Original composition	3:19

UK edition/Brazilian edition/Japanese edition
No.	Title	Writer(s)	Version covered	Length
12.	"Kiss" (featuring Gwyneth Paltrow)	Prince	Prince and The Revolution	3:37
13.	"Landslide" (featuring Gwyneth Paltrow)	Nicks	Dixie Chicks	3:46
14.	"Afternoon Delight" (featuring John Stamos)		Starland Vocal Band	3:11
15.	"Get It Right"	Anders		3:47
16.	"Loser like Me"	Anders, Åström, Kotecha, Martin, Schuster		3:19

Japanese bonus tracks
No.	Title	Writer(s)	Original artist(s)	Length
17.	"Blame It (On the Alcohol)"	James T. Brown, John Conte Jr., Jamie Foxx, Christopher Henderson, Brandon R. Melanchon, Terius Nash, Breyon Prescott, David Ballard, Christopher Stewart, T-Pain & Nathan L. Walker	Jamie Foxx and T-Pain	3:19
18.	"Tik Tok"	Kesha Sebert, Lukasz Gottwald, Benjamin Levin	Kesha	3:19

== Personnel ==
Unless otherwise indicated, Information is based on Liner Notes

- Dianna Agron – vocals (Credit only)
- Adam Anders – musical arrangement, engineer, music producer, vocal producer, soundtrack producer, digital editing, vocal arrangement, additional background vocals (All tracks)
- Alex Anders – digital editing, engineer, additional vocal producer, additional background vocals
- Nikki Anders – additional vocal arrangement, additional background vocals
- Rod Argent – composer
- Peer Åström – musical arrangement, music producer, vocal producer, engineer, mixing (All tracks)
- Kala Balch – additional background vocals
- Dave Bett – art direction
- PJ Bloom – music supervisor
- Ravaughn Brown – additional background vocals
- Geoff Bywater – executive in charge of music
- Deyder Cintron – assistant engineer, digital editing
- Chris Colfer – vocals (Credit only)
- Kamari Copeland – additional background vocals
- Darren Criss – lead vocals (11)
- Tim Davis – vocal contractor, additional vocal arrangement, additional background vocals
- Dante Di Loreto – soundtrack executive producer
- Brad Falchuk – soundtrack executive producer
- Chris Feldman – art direction
- Serban Ghenea – mixing
- Heather Guibert – coordination
- Missi Hale – additional background vocals
- Jon Hall – additional background vocals
- Fredrik Jansson – assistant engineer
- Tobias Kampe-Flygare – assistant engineer
- Storm Lee – additional background vocals
- David Loucks – additional background vocals
- Jane Lynch – vocals (Credit only)
- Meaghan Lyons – coordination
- Dominick Maita – mastering
- Chris Mann – additional background vocals
- Max Martin – music producer, vocal producer (16)
- Jayma Mays – vocals (Credit only)
- Kevin McHale – lead vocals (1, 3, 5, 7–8, 12)
- Lea Michele – lead vocals (1–2, 6, 9–11, 15–16)
- Cory Monteith – lead vocals (1, 3, 10, 16)
- Heather Morris – lead vocals (14, 16)
- Matthew Morrison – lead vocals (13)
- Ryan Murphy – music producer, vocal producer (All tracks), soundtrack producer
- Chord Overstreet – lead vocals (3, 7, 8)
- Gwyneth Paltrow - lead vocals (12–14)
- Ryan Petersen – assistant engineer
- Nicole Ray – coordination
- Amber Riley – lead vocals (1, 9, 12, 16)
- Naya Rivera – lead vocals (1, 14, 16)
- Mark Salling – lead vocals (2, 4)
- Drew Ryan Scott – additional background vocals
- Onitsha Shaw – additional background vocals
- Shellback – music producer, vocal producer (16)
- Jenny Sinclair – coordination
- Jenna Ushkowitz – vocals (Credit only)
- Windy Wagner – additional background vocals
- Joe Wohlmuth – assistant engineer

== Charts and certifications ==
=== Weekly charts ===
Chart (2011)	Peak position
Australian Albums (ARIA)	1
Canadian Albums (Billboard)	3
Dutch Albums (Album Top 100)	27
French Albums (SNEP)	100
Irish Albums (IRMA)	5
Mexican Albums (AMPROFON	23
New Zealand Albums (RMNZ)	3
Scottish Albums (Official Charts)	4
UK Albums (Official Charts)	4
US Billboard 200	3
US Soundtrack Albums (Billboard)	1

=== Year-end charts ===
Chart (2011)	Position
Australian Albums (ARIA)	41
UK Albums (OCC)	135
US Billboard 200	110
US Soundtrack Albums (Billboard)	8

=== Certifications ===
Country	Certification
Australia	Gold
New Zealand	Gold

== Release history ==
List of release dates, showing country and formats released
Country	Release date	Format(s)
Australia	March 8, 2011	Digital download
Canada	March 8, 2011	CD, digital download
New Zealand	March 8, 2011	Digital download
United States	March 8, 2011	CD, digital download
Australia	March 11, 2011	CD
United Kingdom	April 11, 2011	CD, digital download
Italy	October 18, 2011	CD, digital download
