= Original Song =

- Glee episode
- Episode no.: Season 2 Episode 16
- Directed by: Bradley Buecker
- Written by: Ryan Murphy
- Production code: 2ARC16
- Original air date: March 15, 2011

Guest appearances
- Kathy Griffin as Tammy Jean Albertson; Loretta Devine as Sister Mary Constance; Harry Shum, Jr. as Mike Chang; Chord Overstreet as Sam Evans; Darren Criss as Blaine Anderson; Ashley Fink as Lauren Zizes; Bill A. Jones as Rod Remington; Telly Leung as Wes

Episode chronology
← Previous "Sexy"	Next → "A Night of Neglect"
- Glee season 2

"Original Song" is the sixteenth episode of the second season of the American television series Glee, and the thirty-eighth episode overall. It was written by Ryan Murphy, directed by Bradley Buecker, and premiered on Fox in the United States on March 15, 2011. McKinley High's glee club, New Directions, decides to prepare original songs for the Regionals competition against the Dalton Academy Warblers, and Westvale High's Aural Intensity coached by Sue Sylvester (Jane Lynch). Blaine (Darren Criss) finally shows his affection for Kurt (Chris Colfer). Rachel (Lea Michele) tries to repair her relationship with Finn (Cory Monteith) and faces off with Quinn (Dianna Agron). New Directions wins the Midwest Regional Show Choir competition, advancing to the upcoming Nationals competition in New York City.

"Original Song" garnered mostly positive reception. Critics praised the interaction between Kurt and Blaine, as well as most of the original songs in the episode. Mark Perigard of the Boston Herald called it a "great" episode "filled with so many good moments". Cover versions of six songs were featured, including "Raise Your Glass" by Pink and "Blackbird" by The Beatles. The episode also featured an extensive selection of original songs, more so than any previous episode of Glee. The musical performances, cover versions, and original songs in the episode were met with generally positive reviews from critics. With the exception of "Jesus Is My Friend" and "Only Child", all songs were released as singles available for digital download.

Upon its initial airing, this episode was viewed by 11.15 million American viewers and garnered a 4.2/13 rating/share in the 18-49 demographic, according to the Nielsen ratings. The total viewership and ratings for this episode declined slightly from the previous episode, "Sexy".

== Plot ==
After the Warblers rehearse "Misery" in preparation for Regionals, Kurt Hummel (Chris Colfer) confesses his envy over how the Warblers always give Blaine (Darren Criss) the solo performance. Later, Kurt honors the sudden death of the Warblers' canary mascot, Pavarotti, with a performance of "Blackbird". Blaine is visibly moved by Kurt's emotional tribute and realizes that he has feelings for Kurt. He later argues that the Warblers shouldn't rely on him alone for Regionals, and proposes that instead of "Misery", the group should feature a duet. Blaine is adamant that Kurt be his partner for it, and the vote in favor of it is nearly unanimous. As the two are about to practice their duet of "Candles", Blaine confesses that he wanted to spend more time with him, and they share their first kiss.

Rachel's (Lea Michele) second attempt at an original song, "Only Child", proves to be only a small improvement over "My Headband". Finn (Cory Monteith) encourages her to dig deeper into her pain to find her song. Quinn's (Dianna Agron) desire to become prom queen prompts her to get close to Rachel in order to run interference between her and Finn. In doing this, she supports Rachel's idea of writing original songs for Regionals; the members of New Directions eventually agree, due to the fact they received a cease and desist letter from My Chemical Romance saying they can't perform "Sing" for Regionals. Sue Sylvester (Jane Lynch) later admits to forging the letter in yet another attempt to sabotage the glee club. Rachel confronts Quinn about her relationship with Finn, trusting her to be honest. Quinn admits they have been together for a couple of weeks and tells Rachel that she doesn't belong in Lima. Quinn says she will remain behind with Finn and Rachel can't hate her for helping to send her on her way. Hurt, Rachel goes home and uses Quinn's words as a springboard for writing a new song.

Brittany (Heather Morris) confronts Santana (Naya Rivera), saying that she misses their friendship. However, Santana is hostile and angrily says that Brittany "blew her off", while Brittany shows that she is upset that Santana is still dating Sam (Chord Overstreet) even after confessing her love to Brittany. The two are interrupted by Sue, finding that she has filled their lockers with dirt, an event later brought up during the glee club's song writing session.

In rehearsal, director Will Schuester (Matthew Morrison) passes out rhyming dictionaries to help the glee club with songwriting. Showcasing their original songs, Santana sings "Trouty Mouth" as a tribute to Sam's large mouth and Puck (Mark Salling) sings "Big Ass Heart" to Lauren (Ashley Fink). Mercedes (Amber Riley) later sings "Hell to the No". While Will agrees that it's a great song, he says that it's not appropriate for Regionals, also noting that the best songs "come from a place of pain". After the club members share recent hurtful anecdotes by Sue, he writes "Loser Like Me" on the board, deciding that could be the title for the yet-unwritten song.

The judges for this year's Regionals competition are local broadcasting legend Rod Remington (Bill A. Jones), Tea Party candidate and home schooler Tammy Jean Albertson (Kathy Griffin), and former exotic dancer Sister Mary Constance (Loretta Devine). Aural Intensity opens the competition with "Jesus Is My Friend", a song that Sue selected to cater specifically to the judges. The Warblers open with Kurt and Blaine's duet of "Candles", followed by "Raise Your Glass". Rachel conveys feelings to Finn through the performance of her original song, "Get It Right", reflecting on the past failures in their rocky relationship and expressing her deep desire to reconcile with Finn. The New Directions respond to Sue's bullying with their second original song, "Loser like Me", an anthem dedicated to the underdogs of high school. New Directions wins the Regionals competition. Rachel is honored with New Directions' first MVP award.

== Production ==
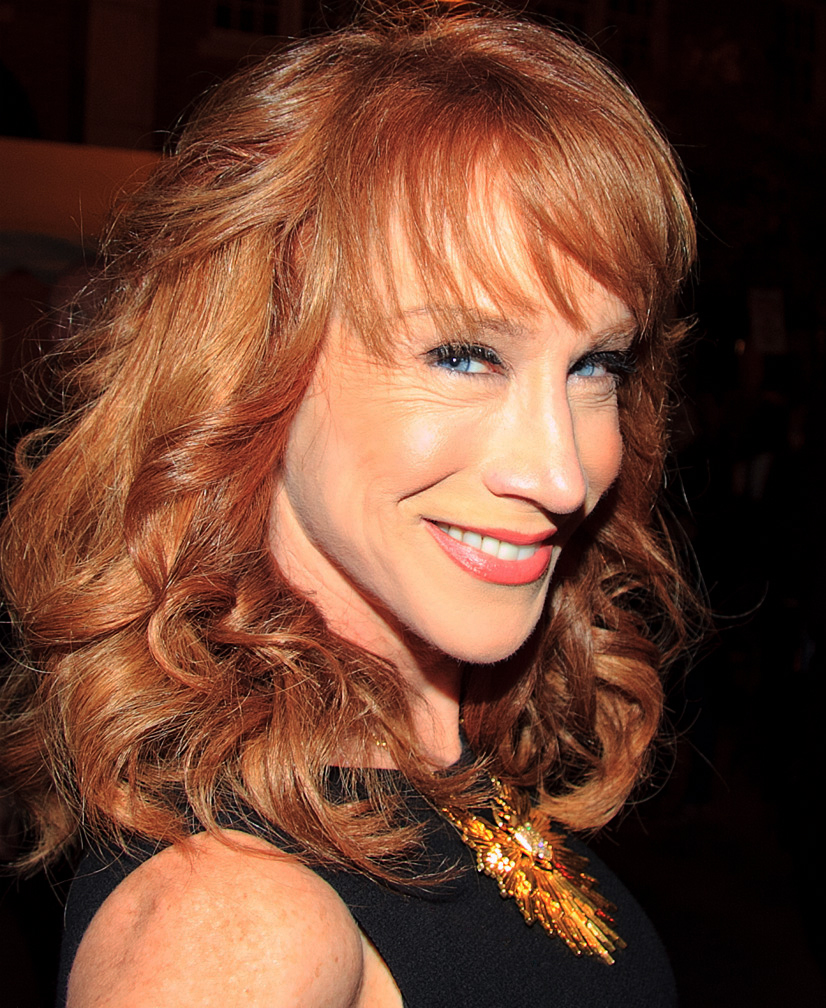
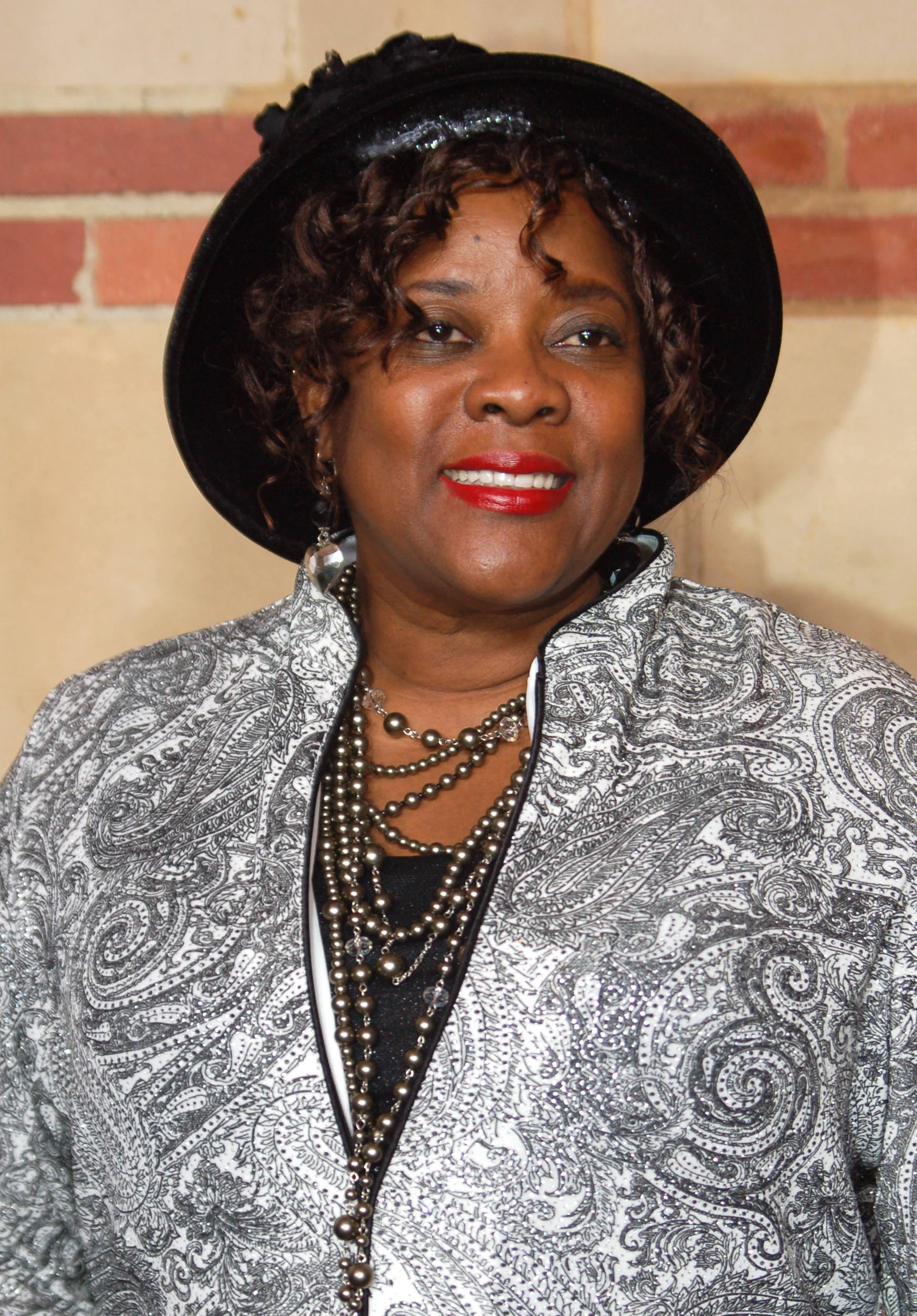
Kathy Griffin (left) and Loretta Devine (right) guest star in "Original Song" as show choir judges.

The casting notice for Tammy Jean described her as "a middle-aged recent Tea Party candidate and home schooler — a Sarah Palin type", while Sister Mary Constance is a former stripper. Kathy Griffin and Loretta Devine were cast to guest-star as Regionals judges Tammy Jean Albertson and Sister Mary Constance respectively. Recurring characters who appear include New Directions members Mike Chang (Harry Shum, Jr.), Sam Evans (Chord Overstreet), Lauren Zizes (Ashley Fink), and Blaine Anderson (Darren Criss), the lead singer of the Dalton Academy Warblers.

Series producer Ryan Murphy first planned an episode entitled "Original Song" to air in early 2010, during the series' first season. Prior to this episode, most of Glee's musical performances were cover versions, and by October 2009 he had received offers from multiple songwriters willing to devise original tracks. At the time, he stated that Diane Warren would write two ballads for the show, and if successful, Glee may continue to use original music in the future, but not all the time. These plans did not come to fruition, nor did a December 2009 claim by OneRepublic frontman Ryan Tedder that he had been recruited by Glee's music supervisor, Adam Anders, to write an original song for the series. Murphy later stated that he planned to showcase original music during the second season, aiming to find a way for this to occur organically, as: "It wouldn’t work [before] if they just broke out and started singing their own songs. You wouldn't get it. I think it has to be an assignment."

Six original tracks were composed for "Original Song", entitled "Get It Right", "Loser like Me", "Hell to the No", "Trouty Mouth", "Only Child" and "Big Ass Heart". The first two songs are featured on the series' sixth soundtrack album, Glee: The Music, Volume 5. In the episode, "Loser Like Me" was performed by New Directions, with club co-captains Rachel Berry (Lea Michele) and Finn Hudson (Cory Monteith) on lead vocals. Described by Glee music supervisor Adam Anders as "a very uptempo, kind-of-summery hit", the song was co-written with Swedish music songwriter and producer Max Martin, known for his work with many pop artists. Having covered many of Martin's co-written songs on the series, including songs by Britney Spears and Kelly Clarkson, Anders felt it was appropriate to have his involvement. According to the American Society of Composers, Authors and Publishers database, co-writers on the song include Anders, Peer Åström, Savan Kotecha, and Johan Schuster. "Get It Right" is a ballad composed specifically for Michele by Anders, his writing partner, and his wife. "Hell to the No" was sung solo by Mercedes. It was titled for the character's signature catchphrase and was co-written by Anders, Astrom, and executive producer Ian Brennan. The episode also features cover versions of Pink's "Raise Your Glass", Maroon 5's "Misery", The Beatles's "Blackbird", Hey Monday's "Candles", and Sonseed's "Jesus Is My Friend". All of the songs except "Jesus Is My Friend" and "Only Child" were released as singles available for digital download.

== Reception ==
=== Ratings ===
"Original Song" was first broadcast on March 15, 2011, in the United States on Fox. It garnered a 4.2/13 Nielsen rating/share in the 18–49 demographic, and received over 11.15 million American viewers during its initial airing, despite airing simultaneously with NCIS on CBS, The Biggest Loser on NBC, No Ordinary Family on ABC, and One Tree Hill on The CW. The total viewership and ratings for this episode were slightly down from those of the previous episode, "Sexy", which was watched by 11.96 million American viewers and received a 4.6/14 rating/share in the 18-49 demographic upon first airing on television.

In Canada, this episode also aired on March 15, 2011, on Global Television Network. The episode was watched by 1.8 million viewers, making it the ninth most-watched television program of the week. In Australia, the episode drew 972,000 viewers, making Glee the tenth most-watched show of the night. In the UK, the episode was watched by 2.41 million viewers (1.97 million on E4, and 440,000 on E4+1), becoming the most-watched show on cable for the week.

=== Critical response ===
"Whether Glee is in the middle of a strong or shaky set of episodes, powerful or ridiculous storylines (or both at once), it usually manages to get things together for its regional/sectional competition episodes. It's the opposite of what one might think, because the demands of those episodes—more and longer songs than usual, judges' deliberations, the competition scenes themselves—might be likely to crowd out character stories. Instead, like a singer overcoming nerves, the moment usually seems to focus Glee, and while "Original Song" was not an all-time great, it was generally a solid episode that did well by a couple of ongoing relationship stories."

— James Poniewozik of Time, on "Original Song"

"Original Song" was met with mostly positive reception from critics upon its initial airing. James Poniewozik of Time called it a "solid" episode and wrote that "it did well by a couple of ongoing relationship stories." Amy Reiter of the Los Angeles Times opined that it delivered several "long-anticipated moments [...] and several more we only wish we'd thought to anticipate." Mark Perigard of the Boston Herald deemed it a "great" episode, "filled with many great moments." Robert Canning of IGN rated it 8/10, signifying a "great" episode. Sandra Gonzalez of Entertainment Weekly praised the development of "Original Song", and wrote: "One great thing about the episode was that after last week's plot-bomb-filled episode, the show didn't completely abandon what we'd learned that week." Emily VanDerWerff of The A.V. Club graded it "B−"; she noted that she enjoyed the scenes, but criticized the show for its inconsistency. Brett Berk of Vanity Fair praised the episode for "not only [...] retreating into the series’s standard, flailing, everybody-in-the-pool narrative template, or filling this metaphorical slough with more leaden tropes than Richard Serra circa 1968, but by having the results be precisely the inevitabilities we all knew would occur." Akash Nikolas at Zap2It praised the new song and its performance as a metaphor for the show: "New Directions flashed Glee’s trademark “L” sign, which the show has renamed as something cool. And instead of cups full of slush that's usually thrown at the Glee Club, the cups were filled with red confetti and thrown at the audience. This neat moment captured the show's conceit: taking something ugly and oppressive and turning it into something beautiful and celebratory."

The guest performances made by Kathy Griffin and Loretta Devine were met with mixed reception from several critics. Amy Reiter was more critical on Griffin's performance as Tammy Jean Albertson, and noted "while Kathy Griffin was sight-gag funny as local tea party candidate Tammy Jean Albertson [...] her lines fell a bit flat." She went on to praise Devine's performance as Sister Mary Constance, saying that her lines "totally hit the bull's-eye." Robert Canning praised both performances, saying that it was the best part of the episode. He continued, "I love how the guest judge segments of these contest episodes are beginning to become mini-series unto themselves. I hope that tradition continues." James Poniewozik had mixed feelings regarding Griffin's performance. He went on to write, "Glee can be sharp and topical enough that I thought it could actually do something clever with the much-publicized cameo. Instead, the performance hinged on expected gags [...] and Griffin delivered it all with a stiffness that felt more like a recitation than a performance." Emily VanDerWerff reacted negatively to both performances. In her review of the episode, she opined, "That judges’ scene [...] was a pale retread of the original, only this time, it had Kathy Griffin and Loretta Devine, as well as a bunch of tired Tea Party gags that were tired when this episode was written."

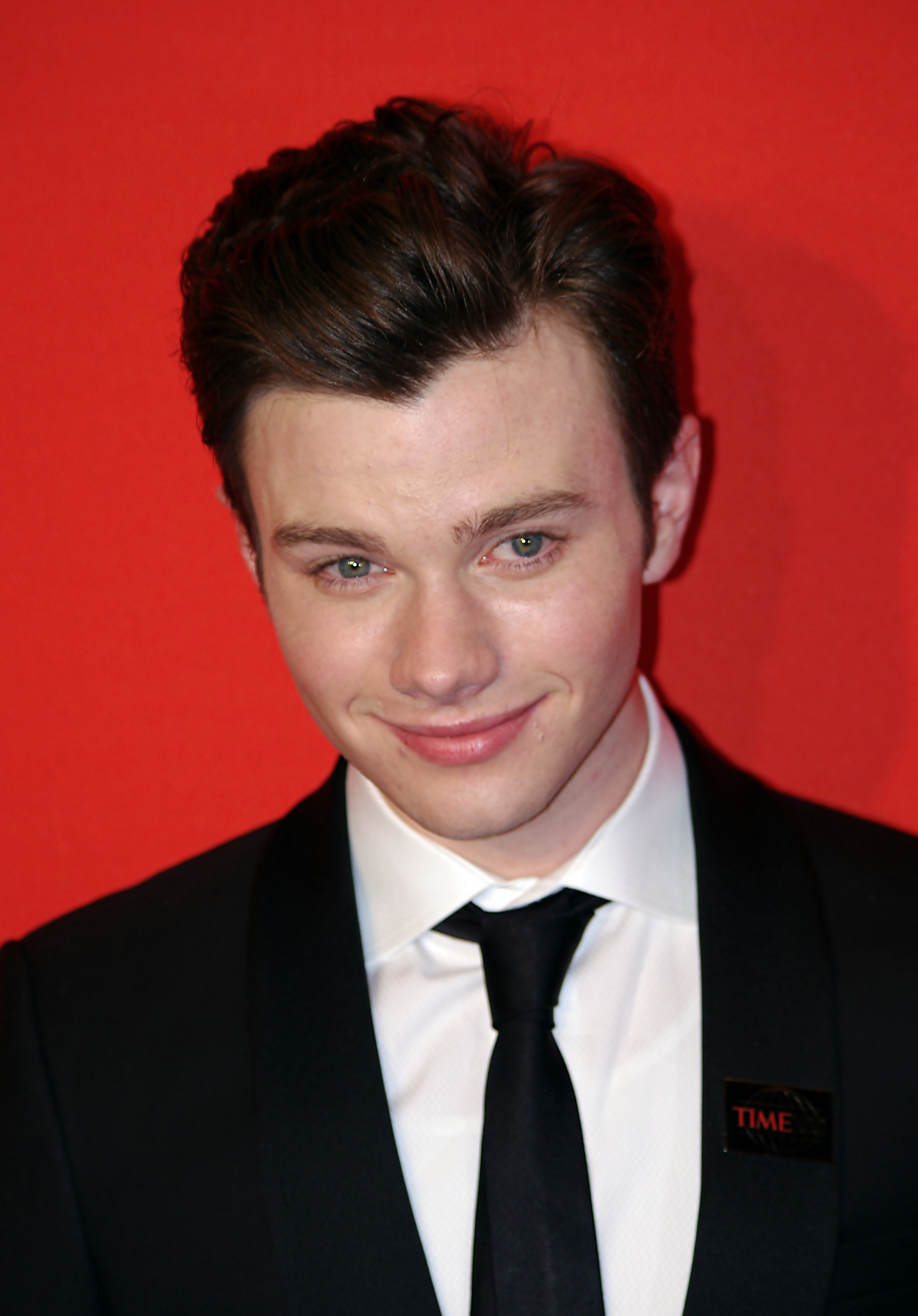
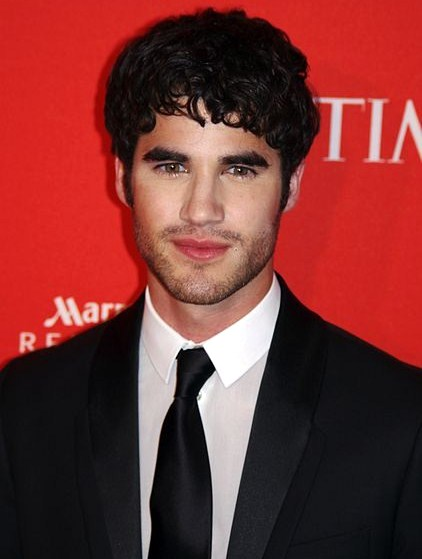
The scene where Kurt (Colfer, left) and Blaine (Criss, right) kissed was widely praised and called a "sweet, real and, shockingly, un-hyped moment".

The Kurt–Blaine storyline was met with general acclaim from critics. In her review for the episode, Katie Morgan of Billboard reacted positively to the interaction between Kurt and Blaine. She wrote, "It sure took them long enough, but we're so glad to finally see Kurt happy." In his review, Mark Perigard opined, "It was utterly, sweetly romantic, and Criss sold the hell out of the moment. It’s long overdue and it will silence the growing legion of critics out there who were unhappy with the pace of this story and why Kurt always seemed to be stuck in pure misery." Robert Canning was more critical on the storyline. He highly criticized Darren Criss' performance as Blaine. In a detailed review regarding the storyline, Canning wrote, "Kurt finally got the first kiss he deserved. Too bad it came from the wooden, glass-eyed Blaine. Chris Colfer has been in the running for performance awards for good reason. Darren Criss will not be. Colfer and his character deserve better than the cardboard, unemotional declaration of love that Criss delivered. Yay for Kurt and his first boyfriend, but that was a bland work up to their kiss." Sandra Gonzalez called the whole development "simply perfect". Kevin Fallon of The Atlantic thought the kiss was "sweet", and stated that he was pleased that it attracted no controversy whatsoever. James Poniewozik reacted positively to the storyline. In his review, Poniewozik wrote, "As for the at-long-last kiss, it's to Glee's credit that it made me think, ‘Finally, Blaine and Kurt are locking lips already!’ before it made me think, ‘Look, an honest-to-God gay kiss, between two men, on my primetime TV show!’" Aly Semigran of MTV praised the interaction between Kurt and Blaine, saying that the kiss scene was a "sweet, real and, shockingly, un-hyped moment". Semigran went on to praise the acting in the scene, saying that both actors "handled it with dignity and honesty". Brett Berk deemed the interaction to be "appropriately fervid".

==== Music and performances ====
"The songs may not have been familiar, but New Directions gave it all they had in their quest to win the Regionals trophy with verve and creativity in “Original Song.” In doing so, they hit refresh on their songbook, and won, not by mimicking others’ hits but performing music they made on their own. And they were pretty darn good."
— Raymund Flandez of The Wall Street Journal on New Direction's performance of "Loser Like Me".

The musical performances and selection in the episode were met with mixed response from critics. The original track "Loser Like Me" received general acclaim from critics. Berk praised the performance, and gave it four stars. He opined, "All four stars are for the lyrics [...] in which the lovable dorks sing about being the lovable dorks we fell in love with [...]". In her review for the episode, Erica Futterman of Rolling Stone praised the song, and called it a "true anthem" that "ends triumphantly". Raymond Flandez of The Wall Street Journal gave a positive review of the song: "The song grew out of a collaborative brainstorming session that went beyond rhyming dictionaries or first attempts at ditties such as 'Trouty Mouth', 'Big Ass Heart', and 'Hell to the No'." Bobby Hankinson of the Houston Chronicle praised the song, and deemed it "fun and summery".

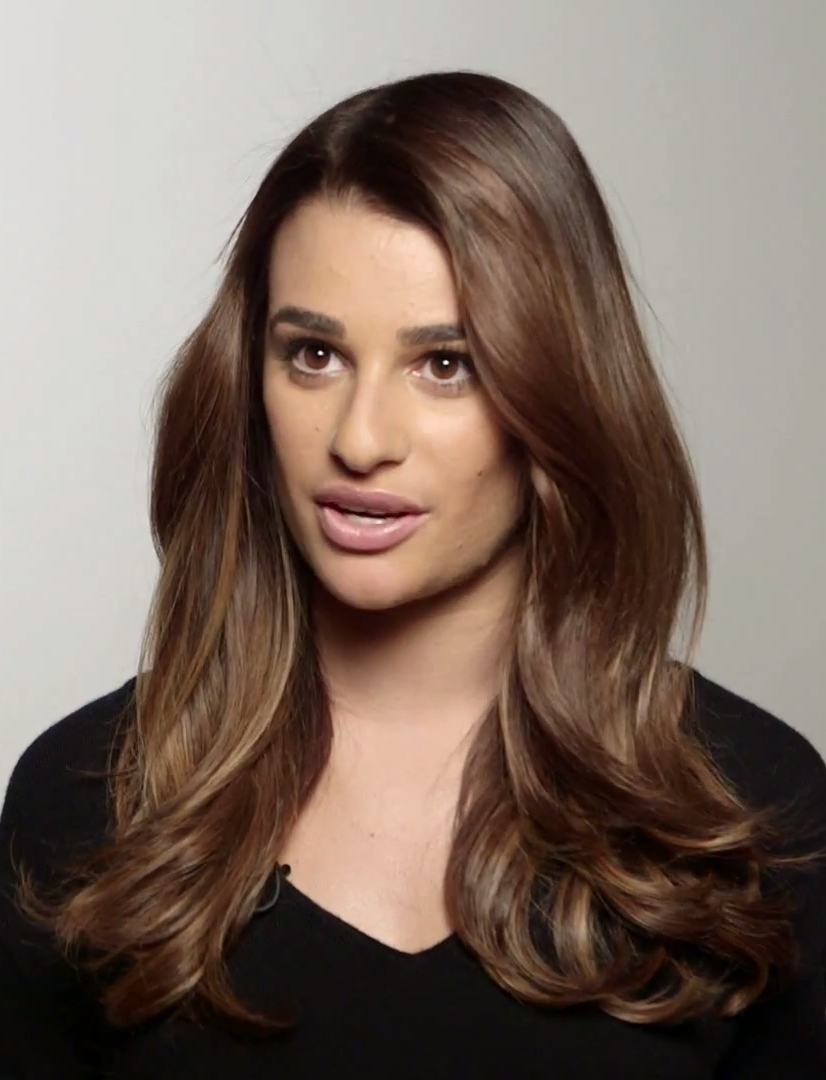
Several critics praised the vocal performance of Lea Michele (pictured) as Rachel in the episode, as well as the development of the character.

Sandra Gonzalez of Entertainment Weekly was generally positive on most of the songs featured in the episode. She gave the performance of "Loser Like Me" a "B", and explained that "This one took a little time to grow on me. I liked it better on the show than when I heard it by itself, which is weird because it's exactly the same thing. Goes to show how much of a difference a good performance [...] makes." Gonzalez gave the highest grade to the cover versions of "Misery" and "Raise Your Glass", both performed by the Dalton Academy Warblers. In her review for "Misery", she praised the performance, and gave it an "A". She opined, "I'm a sucker for a Warbler-ized pop song, especially when it makes Blaine dance and make his weird, animated faces. They're simply adorable, and these Warblers are simply amazing." Gonzalez gave the performance of "Raise Your Glass" an "A". The lowest grade given by Gonzalez was a "D" for Santana's performance of "Trouty Mouth". She explained "If we're taking this song as a joke, it gets a 'B−' because Santana sounded great. But [...] I think about how bad I felt for Sam watching his utter mortification." "Candles" was generally well received by Gonzalez. She gave the performance a "B" and went on to write "It’s really hard for this pair to live up to the awesomeness of 'Baby, It's Cold Outside'. I'm sure they could one day, but this one fell a bit short for me musically. [...] In the context of the show, however, it was a great moment."

Amy Reiter of the Los Angeles Times reacted positively to all of the songs. In her review for "Original Song", Reiter opined that "The original songs [...] weren't half bad: From Santana's ode to poor, horrified Sam, 'Trouty Mouth,' to Puck's tribute to Lauren, 'Big Ass Heart,' to Mercedes' self-celebrating 'Hell to the No,' the original songs on this episode were funny and revealing. And rousing Regionals-winning anthem 'Loser Like Me' landed like an exuberant slushy in the face [...]." Katie Morgan of Billboard praised the performance of "Candles", and called it "beautifully intimate", and commended The Warblers' "solid performance". Emily VanDerrWerf of The A.V. Club responded negatively to "Trouty Mouth", but was generally pleased with the other songs. VanDerWerff went on to praise the voice of Lea Michele: "The first song Rachel sang at regionals [...] was a nicely done little ballad, the sort of song you could both see someone like Rachel writing and later belting." James Poniewozik also praised the voice of Michele, as well as her character development. He opined, "That said, I like the arc of Rachel-as-songwriter, which has played to some of Lea Michele's greatest strengths both as a comic and dramatic actress." Robert Canning of IGN found the original songs to be "hilarious". He opined, "Getting to run through a series of comical and catchy false starts was entertaining. Santana's 'Trouty Mouth' was sultry and hilarious. Puckerman's rocking ode to Lauren, 'Big Ass Heart,' was also a ridiculous treat. And then both were outdone by Mercedes' stomping, Amy Winehouse-aping 'Hell to the No'."

=== Chart history ===
Seven of the eleven songs featured on the episode charted on several popular musical charts. In the United States, "Loser Like Me" debuted on the Billboard Hot 100 at number six, and in Canada, the song debuted at number nine on the Canadian Hot 100. The single was the second highest-charting single for Glee after "Don't Stop Believin'", and sold 210,000 downloads its first week in the US, second only to the cast's cover of Katy Perry's "Teenage Dream", which sold 214,000 downloads in its first week. It was certified gold in the US before the end of 2011. "Get It Right" debuted at number sixteen on the Billboard Hot 100 and number twenty-three on the Canadian Hot 100. These two original songs were featured in the soundtrack album Glee: The Music, Volume 5. It was released on March 15, 2011, and debuted at number three on the Billboard 200, selling over 90,000 copies in its first week in the United States. A third original song, "Hell to the No", was released only as a single, and debuted at number fifty-three on the Billboard Hot 100 and number sixty-five on the Canadian Hot 100. Four covers from the episode were featured on the album Glee: The Music Presents the Warblers, which was released on April 19, 2011, and all four charted in the top 100 in the US, Australia, and Canada: "Misery", "Blackbird", "Candles", and "Raise Your Glass".
