= Light Up the World (Glee song) =

Single by Glee Cast

from the album Glee: The Music, Volume 6
- Released: June 11, 2011
- Genre: Dance-pop, pop rock
- Length: 3:43
- Label: Columbia
- Songwriters: Adam Anders, Peer Åström, Max Martin, Johan Schuster, Savan Kotecha
- Producers: Adam Anders, Max Martin

Glee Cast singles chronology
"Pretending" (2011)	"Light Up the World" (2011)	"We Got the Beat" (2011)

"Light Up the World" is a song performed by the cast of American television series Glee, taken from their eight soundtrack album, Glee: The Music, Volume 6. The song was written by the series' music producer Adam Anders, Swedish pop music producer Max Martin, and Peer Åström, Savan Kotecha, and Johan Schuster. Anders and Martin produced the track. The song features solos from Naya Rivera (Santana Lopez), Heather Morris (Brittany Pierce), Kevin McHale (Artie Abrams), Lea Michele (Rachel Berry), Cory Monteith (Finn Hudson), and Jenna Ushkowitz (Tina Cohen-Chang).

== Charts ==
Chart (2011)	Peak position
Australia (ARIA)	78
Canada Hot 100 (Billboard)	26
France (FRA)	188
Ireland (IRMA)	46
UK Singles (Official Charts Company)	48
US Billboard Hot 100	33
