= Movieline =

American magazine and website

- Categories: Film; Entertainment
- Frequency: Monthly
- First issue: 1985 (local), 1989 (national)
- Final issue: 2009 (print), 2014 (online)
- Country: United States
- Website: movieline.com (defunct)
- ISSN: 1055-0917

Movieline was a Los Angeles–based film and entertainment magazine, launched in 1985 as a local magazine, which went national in 1989. Known for its cult status and popularity among film critics, the magazine eventually was retooled and named Movieline's Hollywood Life, with the website renamed as hollywoodlife.com and the name on the webpage shown as Hollywood Life.

Penske Media Corporation bought Movieline's Hollywood Life in September 2008 and, in 2009, closed the magazine. At that time, Penske continued the Hollywood Life website as a "new" standalone entity, while relaunching the original Movieline website. The Hollywood Life website continues today (2024), but the Movieline website closed down sometime in 2014. The last movie review credited to a Movieline critic on Metacritic was written on 27 July 2014, a retrospective review for the 2010 film The Killer Inside Me.

Movieline launched a YouTube channel on 15 August 2012, which no one has taken down as of November 2024; at that date, it holds an assortment of reviews, TV series recaps, interviews, and movie trailers dating from 16 August 2012 (the official trailer for The Last Stand) through 12 September 2014 (a Movieline review of Dolphin Tale 2).
