= Christmas Song =

Christmas Song may refer to:

- Christmas music, music performed or heard around the Christmas season
- "Christmas Song" (Gilbert O'Sullivan song), 1974
- Christmas Song (album), 2007, by Mannheim Steamroller
- Christmas Song, 2012 TV film directed by Timothy Bond and starring Natasha Henstridge
- "The Christmas Song", 1945 song by Bob Wells and Mel Tormé
- The Christmas Song (Nat King Cole album), 1999 reissue of The Magic of Christmas, originally released in 1960
- The Christmas Song (EP), 2014, by Jamey Johnson
- "The Christmas Song", a 2001 song by Weezer from the Christmas CD

== See also ==
- Christmas Songs (disambiguation)
- Christmas Album (disambiguation)
