= Furt =

- Glee episode
- Episode no.: Season 2 Episode 8
- Directed by: Carol Banker
- Written by: Ryan Murphy
- Production code: 2ARC08
- Original air date: November 23, 2010

Guest appearances
- Carol Burnett as Doris Sylvester; Romy Rosemont as Carole Hudson; Dot-Marie Jones as Shannon Beiste; Daniel Roebuck as Paul Karofsky; Harry Shum Jr. as Mike Chang; Chord Overstreet as Sam Evans; Max Adler as Dave Karofsky; Bill A. Jones as Rod Remington; Rich Ceraulo as the reverend; Jo Anderson as Marcia Dean; Earlene Davis as Andrea Carmichael; Lauren Potter as Becky Jackson; Robin Trocki as Jean Sylvester

Episode chronology
← Previous "The Substitute"	Next → "Special Education"
- Glee season 2

"Furt" is the eighth episode of the second season of the American musical television series Glee, and the thirtieth episode overall. It was written by series creator Ryan Murphy, directed by Carol Banker, and premiered on Fox in the United States on November 23, 2010. The episode features a guest appearance by actress Carol Burnett as a Nazi hunter and mother of cheerleading coach Sue Sylvester (Jane Lynch), who shows up for the first time in years, just in time to attend Sue's wedding to herself. The long-anticipated wedding of Burt Hummel (Mike O'Malley) and Carole Hudson (Romy Rosemont) is also featured, and the bullying storyline reaches a climax that results in Kurt (Chris Colfer) transferring from McKinley High to Dalton Academy at the end of the episode.

The episode features covers of four songs; they received generally favorable reviews. Three were featured during the Hummel–Hudson wedding sequence, and the two songs by Bruno Mars, "Marry You" and "Just the Way You Are", charted both on the Billboard Hot 100 and internationally. Burnett's appearance, and her song with Lynch, were lauded by most critics, as was the central wedding of Hudson and Hummel, but Sue's wedding to herself was widely panned. Additionally, a few reviewers, including The Atlantic's Kevin Fallon, thought the bullying storyline had been stretched over too many episodes.

Upon its initial airing, this episode was viewed by 10.41 million American viewers and garnered a 4.0/12 Nielsen rating/share in the 18–49 demographic, its lowest for the second season to that point, and down substantially from the previous episode, "The Substitute".

== Plot ==
Burt Hummel and Carole Hudson tell their sons, New Directions glee club members Kurt and Finn, that they are engaged. Principal Sue Sylvester announces her intention to marry herself, and glee club member Sam Evans offers fellow member Quinn Fabray a promise ring.

Kurt is menaced by Dave Karofsky, and badly shaken, but Sue can only punish Karofsky if he physically attacks Kurt. Glee club co-captain Rachel Berry convinces the glee club girls to have their boyfriends defend Kurt, but her boyfriend, Finn, refuses, and is still self centered about his position as quarterback. Artie Abrams, Noah Puckerman and Mike Chang along with Sam confront Karofsky, demanding he leave Kurt alone. Karofsky retaliates, and Sam fights him. Quinn is impressed and accepts Sam's ring. Karofsky later sees Kurt and Finn practicing a wedding dance and taunts them in front of Burt. After Kurt admits that Karofsky threatened to kill him, Burt instigates a meeting with Sue, Karofsky's father, and the two boys; Sue expels Karofsky.

While the Hummel–Hudson wedding is being arranged, Sue advances her own marriage plans. Her mother, Doris, a retired Nazi hunter who was an absentee parent to Sue and her sister Jean, arrives attempting to atone for her absence, but is so critical of her daughter that Sue disinvites her.

The day of the wedding, Santana Lopez, who wants another chance at Finn, suggests he reveal they had sex to boost his popularity at school. (Note: This took place in the season one episode "The Power of Madonna".) He refuses, as he loves Rachel, who admitted to him that she lied when she claimed to have slept with her then-boyfriend Jesse; Finn claimed he never had sex with Santana.

At the wedding, New Directions perform "Marry You" by Bruno Mars, after which Burt and Carole are married. Finn uses his best man speech to apologize to Kurt; he announces that Finn and Kurt are now "Furt". The glee club dedicates a performance of Mars' "Just the Way You Are" to Kurt, and the stepbrothers dance together. Kurt and his parents learn that the school board reversed Karofsky's expulsion and gave him a verbal warning. Sue resigns as principal in protest, reinstating Principal Figgins as principal, and Burt and Carole use their honeymoon savings to enroll Kurt at Dalton Academy, which has a zero-tolerance policy against bullying and is the school that Kurt's friend Blaine attends.

== Production ==
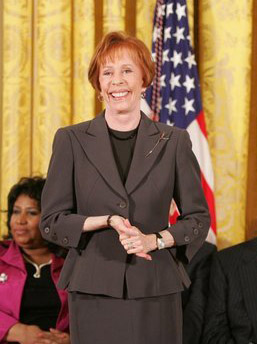
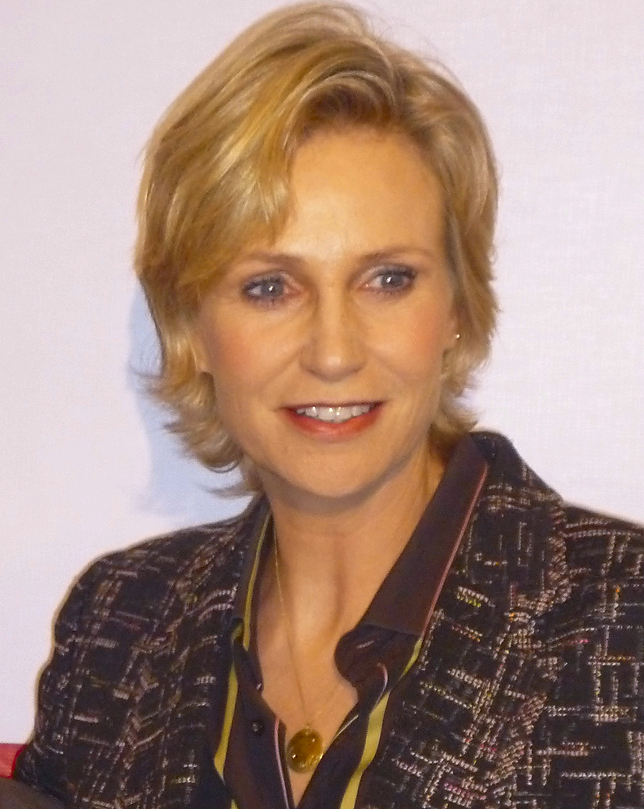
Carol Burnett (left) appears in this episode as Doris Sylvester, mother of Sue (Jane Lynch, right)

Sue's parents were mentioned and their occupations as Nazi hunters revealed in the season one episode "The Power of Madonna". According to Lynch, Sue's mother left her two daughters to pursue her career, and returns home retired after the last Nazi has been captured. On working with Burnett, Lynch said, "I'm a little nervous, but I can't wait to get in scenes with her ... It's like playing tennis with a master." The origin behind Sue's antagonistic personality was explored in this episode; plans at the time were for Burnett to reappear on the series in a future episode. This is Burnett's and Lynch's second time working together, the first being the 2009 comedy film Post Grad.

In an interview after BAFTA/LA's Brittania Awards, Lynch told People a wedding was in the future for her character. A tracksuit wedding dress was created by personal costume designer Ali Rahimi.

Recurring characters in this episode include glee club members Mike Chang and Sam Evans, cheerleader Becky Jackson (Lauren Potter), athlete and school bully Dave Karofsky, football coach Shannon Beiste (Dot-Marie Jones), and local news anchors Rod Remington (Bill A. Jones) and Andrea Carmichael (Earlene Davis). In addition, Rosemont and Burnett star as Carole and Doris, the respective mothers of Finn and Sue, and Daniel Roebuck plays Karofsky's father, Paul.

Four songs were covered on the episode and were all released as singles available for digital download. The song "Ohio" from the 1953 musical Wonderful Town was covered as a duet between Burnett and Lynch. In an interview with TV Guide, Burnett revealed that her husband suggested the possibility of her doing the song since her character was returning to Ohio after an absence; she then brought it to Glee creator Ryan Murphy's attention. Additionally, two Bruno Mars songs were featured—"Just the Way You Are" and "Marry You"—as well as Pablo Beltrán Ruiz's "Sway" as covered by Michael Bublé. All songs except "Ohio" are included on the album Glee: The Music, Volume 4.

== Reception ==
=== Ratings and viewership ===
"Furt" was first broadcast on November 23, 2010, in the United States on Fox. It was watched by 10.41 million American viewers during its initial airing—Glee's lowest viewership for the second season to that point—and was the fifteenth-most-watched show of the week across all channels. It garnered a 4.0/12 Nielsen rating/share in the 18–49 demographic, which made it the highest-rated show in its timeslot, and the third-highest-rated scripted show of the week amongst adults aged 18–49. The total viewership and ratings for this episode were down significantly from those of the previous episode, "The Substitute", which was watched by 11.70 million American viewers and acquired a 5.0/14 rating/share in the 18–49 demographic upon first airing on November 16, 2010.

The episode's Canadian broadcast, also on November 23, 2010, attained 2.10 million viewers, which placed Glee ninth in the weekly program rankings. Viewership declined slightly from "The Substitute", which was watched by 2.29 million, but also ranked ninth. "Furt" aired in Australia on November 29, 2010, where it drew 1.33 million viewers, and was the second-most-watched show of the night and third of the week. Here, viewership increased from "The Substitute", which attained 1.06 million viewers and ranked seventh for the night and nineteenth for the week. David Dale noted in The Sydney Morning Herald that Glee faced weaker competition than usual, as Network Ten was "the only commercial network showing new episodes of its top shows". In the UK, the episode aired on February 28, 2011, and was watched by 2.43 million viewers—2.03 million on E4, and 406,000 on E4+1—which made it the most-watched show on both channels and the second-most-watched show on cable for the week. Here again, viewership was down from the previous episode, which drew 2.55 million viewers and was the most-watched show across all cable channels.

=== Critical reception ===
"Furt" received a generally positive reception from critics, though there were some dissenting viewpoints. Meghan Brown of The Atlantic wrote that the episode "worked beautifully". The A.V. Club's Emily VanDerWerff called it a "largely terrific episode of television", and gave it a "B+". Lisa Respers France of CNN was reminded of "how well this show marries plot with music", and Rolling Stone's Erica Futterman concluded, "The focus on the show's best characters, Kurt and Sue, kept the show balanced between heart and bite—just the way we like our Glee". IGN's Robert Canning was less enthusiastic; he called it an "unfocused jumble of an episode" and gave it a score of 7 out of 10. The BuddyTV reviewers were split, with Jen Harper quite happy, and John Kubicek who wrote that he hated the entire episode.

Most reviews heaped praise on the guest appearance of Carol Burnett, who played Sue's Nazi-hunting absentee mother Doris. Bobby Hankinson of the Houston Chronicle said Burnett was a "well-used guest star", and he "loved every minute she was on screen." Dave Itzkoff of The New York Times asked "who could not be charmed" by Burnett, and the Wall Street Journal's Raymund Flandez lauded the "tour-de-force panache and sharp-tongued deadpan by Carol Burnett", and called her appearance the "best guest casting this season".

The marriage of Burt Hummel and Carole Hudson received generally good marks. VanDerWerff wrote, "it's rare that an episode of television can make a hurried wedding between two middle-aged people who are rarely on the show into something so well-conceived and thrillingly moving." Amy Reiter of the Los Angeles Times noted, "Every character in that family rings emotionally true." Entertainment Weekly's Tim Stack was pleased with the performances of Mike O'Malley as Burt and Romy Rosemont as Carole; he also welcomed the episode's increased focus on Finn, and praised Cory Monteith as a "good, natural actor". Kevin Fallon of The Atlantic was unhappy with both weddings, and Canning said they "took up most of this episode, and unfortunately neither were entirely successful". Several reviewers noted the "homage" of the wedding procession dance, including Hankinson, Anthony Benigno of the Daily News; the Wall Street Journal invited readers to compare the original viral "JK Wedding Entrance Dance" YouTube video and the subsequent dancing procession from the "Niagara" episode of The Office with Glee's version in "Furt", while Stack made his own comparison, and said Glee's was "just about as good" as the original, and "a blast to watch".

Sue Sylvester's marriage to herself was lambasted by many critics, including Vanity Fair's Brett Berk, who said it "was about as compelling as a hair lollipop". Patrick Burns of The Atlantic was also unimpressed, especially "because the main plot points of this episode are otherwise so effective"; his colleague Fallon was brief and to the point: "Blergh."

There was disagreement on the bullying storyline. Some critics, including Canning and Hankinson, praised it, while others had reservations, such as Brown, who characterized it as "heavy-handed", and Fallon, who considered it "well-acted" but "far too stagnant". The Sam and Quinn storyline was panned by VanDerWerff, who wrote "the series has wasted whatever chemistry the two had in 'Duets' on scenes where Sam talks about how he wants to be the most popular kid in school", and by Kubicek, who criticized the lack of consistency in Sam's characterization.

=== Music and performances ===
The musical performances and cover versions in the episode attracted generally positive reviews, though a few reviewers noted that the program had been on for twenty-three minutes before the first song appeared. While Fallon said it was an "interminable wait" for the first musical number, "Ohio", and Reiter cited the delay as flaw, James Poniewozik of Time thought it a "credit to the episode" that he had not noticed the absence of music to that point. Flandez and Futterman commented favorably on all the musical numbers, though Canning felt the songs were a "disappointing aspect of this episode", and none were "exceptionally memorable".

The duet of Burnett and Lynch on "Ohio" was well received. Jean Bentley of AOL TV praised it as "simply magnificent", Zap2it's Hanh Nguyen called it a "fantastic job" and Flandez said it was "lovely" and that "the bickering interlude was a delight." Others tempered their praise: Berk gave it three of five stars and noted the "bland staging", and Benigno graded it a "C" and called it "boring", though he said "their voices work well" together; Stack gave it a "B+" with the caveat that it was "a little too theatrical".

The dancing wedding procession and its accompanying performance of the Bruno Mars song "Marry You" were mostly praised. Stack gave it an "A" and Berk five stars out of five, and Amanda Hensel of AOL Music called it "easily one of the best performances of the season". Benigno gave it a "B" primarily because the cast didn't "do anything particularly interesting with it" vocally, but called the performance "pure joy". Flandez wrote that "two Bruno Mars songs that were brilliant in execution and touching in sentiment", and Futterman agreed: "the Bruno Mars songs gave the show two of its best performances this season". While Benigno and Stack also praised "Just the Way You Are", and both gave the song an "A", Harper thought Monteith's vocals as Finn "aren't the strongest" and Bentley also wished Finn had not been the soloist. Additionally, Harper criticized the failure of the show to adjust the song's pronouns from feminine to masculine when Finn was singing to Kurt, and noted that Gwyneth Paltrow had changed pronouns while singing Cee Lo Green's "Forget You" the week before. Hankinson was more impressed with "Just the Way You Are", and gave it a "slight edge" over "Marry You" for the episode's "best musical number", "given the emotional context".

Matthew Morrison's performance of "Sway" received the most divergent opinions. Some reviewers mentioned how closely it resembled Michael Bublé's version: Benigno graded it "A−" and said "Matthew Morrison sounds exactly like Bublé here, which is both unbelievably impressive (Bublé's got some pipes on him), and takes a little bit away from the number (easy to write it off as an impression)" (emphasis in the original), Stack gave it a "B" and characterized it as "pretty simple, but Matthew Morrison does a mean Michael Bublé", and Bentley called it "a perfectly fine cover", though Futterman said it "can't beat Michael Bublé's take". Among those who did not compare Morrison to Bublé, Hensel called it a "beautiful solo performance", while Berk gave it two stars out of five and wrote "Shue sings it just like a real wedding singer", and Nguyen said the song felt "out of place".

=== Chart history ===
Only two of the four cover versions released as singles—the two songs by Bruno Mars—debuted on the Billboard Hot 100, and appeared on other musical charts. On the Hot 100, the show's rendition of "Marry You" debuted at number thirty-two; it was number nineteen on the Canadian Hot 100. The other song on the Hot 100 was "Just the Way You Are" at number forty, which also made number twenty-four on the Canadian Hot 100. That same week, Mars's own single of "Marry You" also debuted on these same charts, though well below the Glee cover version, at number ninety-one on the Hot 100 and number eighty-nine on the Canadian Hot 100; his single of "Just the Way You Are" was in the top five on both charts that week.
