= Special Education (Glee) =

- Glee episode
- Episode no.: Season 2 Episode 9
- Directed by: Paris Barclay
- Written by: Brad Falchuk
- Production code: 2ARC09
- Original air date: November 30, 2010

Guest appearances
- John Stamos as Dr. Carl Howell; Harry Shum, Jr. as Mike Chang; Chord Overstreet as Sam Evans; Darren Criss as Blaine Anderson; Mike Hagerty as Pete Sosnowski; Max Adler as Dave Karofsky; James Earl as Azimio; Ashley Fink as Lauren Zizes; Telly Leung as Wes

Episode chronology
← Previous "Furt"	Next → "A Very Glee Christmas"
- Glee season 2

"Special Education" is the ninth episode of the second season of the American musical television series Glee, and the thirty-first episode overall. It was written by series creator Brad Falchuk, directed by Paris Barclay, and aired on Fox in the United States on November 30, 2010. In "Special Education", the McKinley High School glee club New Directions competes in the Sectionals round of show choir competition against the Hipsters and the Dalton Academy Warblers, while dealing with internal feuding that threatens to rip the club apart.

The episode shows the former member of New Directions, Kurt Hummel (Chris Colfer), at his new school Dalton Academy, where he joins the rival Warblers. With his departure, New Directions must find a new twelfth member to remain eligible for the competition. Club director Will Schuester (Matthew Morrison) decides to feature overlooked performers from the group for Sectionals, to the consternation of the usual lead singers, Rachel Berry (Lea Michele) and Finn Hudson (Cory Monteith). The episode received a wide range of reviews, with a small majority commenting favorably; some viewed it as a lesser version of the first season's Sectionals episode. By contrast, the six songs covered during the show received generally favorable reviews, with the most praise going to "Dog Days Are Over" and "Valerie" as performed by New Directions, and "Hey, Soul Sister" as sung by the Warblers.

Upon its initial airing, this episode was viewed by 11.68 million American viewers and garnered a 4.6/13 Nielsen rating/share in the 18–49 demographic, up significantly from the previous episode, "Furt".

== Plot ==
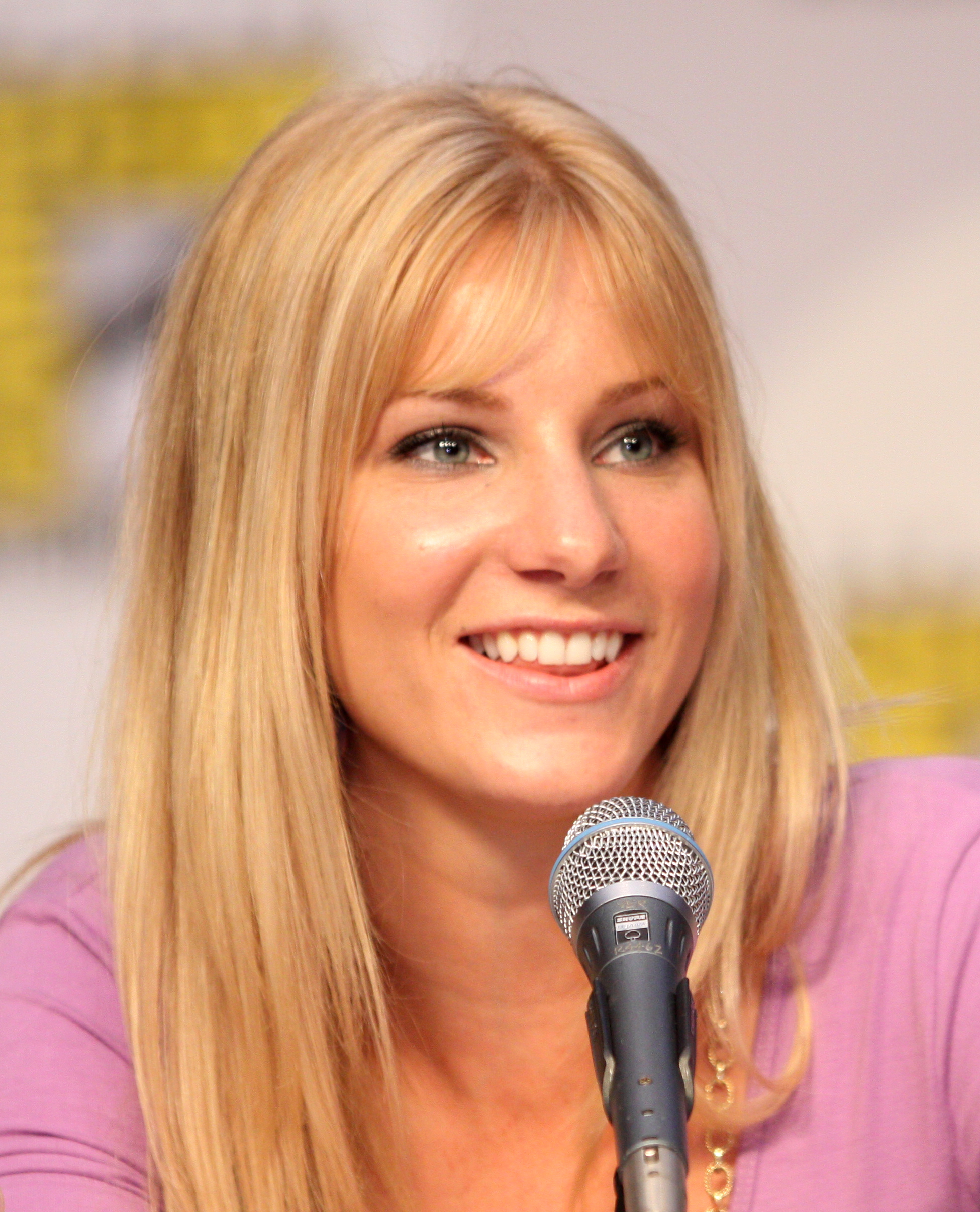
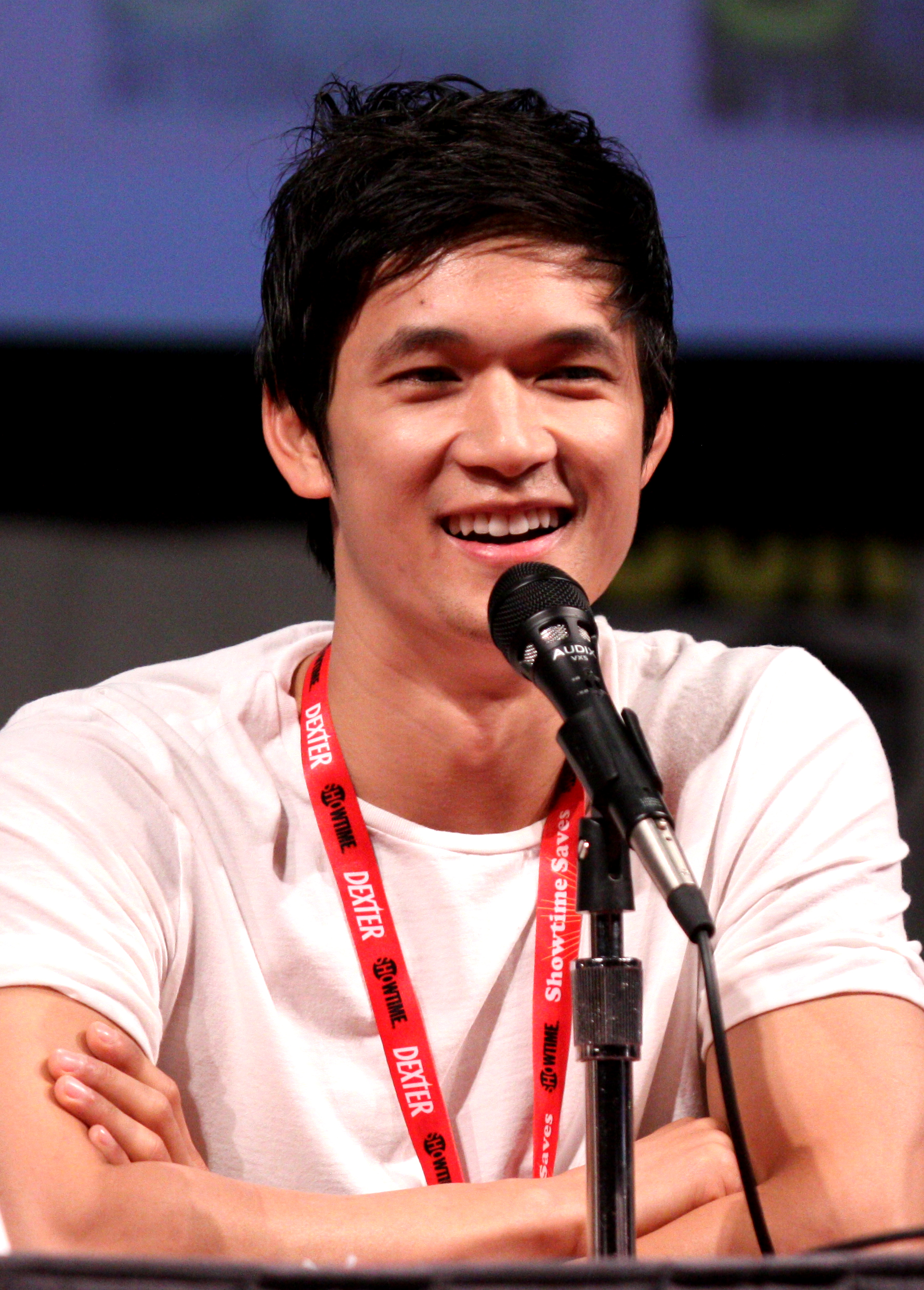
The dance skills of Heather Morris (left) and Harry Shum Jr. (right) were highlighted in this episode.

The show choir Sectionals competition is imminent, (Note: The first Sectionals event was seen in the season one episode entitled "Sectionals".) and the New Directions glee club is one below the required minimum of twelve members now that Kurt Hummel (Chris Colfer) has enrolled at Dalton Academy, home of their Sectionals' rivals the Warblers. At club director Will Schuester's (Matthew Morrison) behest, Puck (Mark Salling) attempts to recruit his football teammates, but they lock him in a port-a-potty. He is rescued the next day by AV Club president and wrestler Lauren Zizes (Ashley Fink), and she agrees to join New Directions, though he has to bribe her first.

Will invites school guidance counselor Emma Pillsbury (Jayma Mays) to accompany him to Sectionals. She accepts, and suggests he consider featuring other club members instead of his usual choices, co-captains Finn Hudson (Cory Monteith) and Rachel Berry (Lea Michele). Will gives the lead vocals for one song to duets competition winners Quinn Fabray (Dianna Agron) and Sam Evans (Chord Overstreet), (Note: The duets competition occurred in the season two episode entitled "Duets".) which upsets Rachel and Finn, while Brittany Pierce (Heather Morris) and Mike Chang (Harry Shum Jr.) are given lead dancing roles on another number. When Brittany admits she is nervous about performing, her boyfriend Artie Abrams (Kevin McHale) gives her a "magic comb" to boost her confidence. She and Mike commence time-consuming rehearsals for their dance routine, and Mike's girlfriend Tina Cohen-Chang (Jenna Ushkowitz) suspects that they are having an affair; when Artie confronts Brittany about it, she confesses that she has been avoiding him because she lost his comb. Artie admits that the comb was never magical, and tells Brittany that she is magic.

Kurt attends his first meeting with the Dalton Academy Warblers. He learns that the setlist for Sectionals is selected by a council of upperclassmen, and is offered a chance to audition for a solo at Sectionals. He visits Rachel for advice, and at her recommendation sings "Don't Cry for Me Argentina" from the musical Evita. Kurt is not given a solo, and his friend Blaine (Darren Criss) suggests that he try to fit in rather than stand out.

Santana (Naya Rivera) tells Rachel that she and Finn had sex the previous spring, and Rachel is furious that Finn's claim to be a virgin was a lie. Emma counsels them, and then realizes that she should not attend Sectionals with Will since her boyfriend Carl (John Stamos) would be hurt; she and Carl fly to Las Vegas, Nevada for the weekend.

At sectionals, the Hipsters and the Warblers perform first, the latter singing Train's "Hey, Soul Sister" with Blaine on lead. Despite much backstage drama, the New Directions set goes smoothly, with Quinn and Sam performing "(I've Had) The Time of My Life" and Santana singing lead on Amy Winehouse's cover of The Zutons' "Valerie"; Brittany and Mike receive several bursts of applause for their dancing. New Directions and the Warblers tie for first place, which means that both groups will advance to the Regionals competition.

Emma tells Will that she married Carl in Las Vegas, and despite his shock, Will says he is happy for her. Finn breaks up with Rachel after she confesses that she made out with Puck to get back at him over Santana. New Directions performs Florence and the Machine's "Dog Days Are Over" to celebrate the club's competition survival, with Tina and Mercedes (Amber Riley) singing lead.

== Production ==
The competitors for Sectionals were announced three episodes prior in "Never Been Kissed": the a cappella Warblers from Dalton Academy, an all-male institution in Westerville—they were seen in that episode performing the song "Teenage Dream"—and the Hipsters from the Warren Township continuing education program, which consists of seniors working toward earning General Educational Development diplomas. While Criss sings lead on the Warblers song, the background vocals are sung by the Tufts Beelzebubs, a male a cappella group from Tufts University in Medford, Massachusetts, not the actors playing the Warblers on screen. The Beelzebubs had not yet met Criss at the time the episode aired. The scenes of the Warblers performance of "Hey, Soul Sister" were filmed in a theater over the course of two fifteen-hour days, according to Chris Mann, one of the actors: from the front on the first day, and from the back on the second.

Cheyenne Jackson as Dustin Goolsby and John Stamos as Carl Howell were originally supposed to have scenes in this episode—the Fox publicity included a photograph of a scene between Dustin and Will—but Jackson's was cut entirely, and only a brief shot of Stamos embracing Mays as Emma was retained in the final version. Recurring characters in this episode include glee club members Mike Chang (Shum) and Sam Evans (Overstreet), school bullies Dave Karofsky (Max Adler) and Azimio (James Earl), Stamos as Howell, and Criss as Blaine Anderson, lead singer of the Warblers. Vicki Woodlee, mother of Glee choreographer Zach Woodlee, plays one of the Hipsters; as the youngest of the performers at 60, she had to wear a great deal of makeup to emulate an older person's appearance, including "pounds of powder". Zach Woodlee instructed those cast as Hipsters, the oldest of whom was 83, to limit their dance movements to seem more realistic. Scenes were filmed over the course of four days. Actress and former American Bandstand member Bunny Gibson plays another group member. Co-stars include Fink, who appears as new glee club member Lauren Zizes, Telly Leung and Titus Makin Jr., who return as Warblers Wes and David, respectively, and Riker Lynch, Eddy Martin and Curt Mega, who debut as Warblers Jeff, Thad and Nick, respectively.

"Special Education" features cover versions of six songs: "Don't Cry for Me Argentina" from the musical Evita, Mike + The Mechanics' "The Living Years", Train's "Hey, Soul Sister", "(I've Had) The Time of My Life" from the film Dirty Dancing, "Valerie" by The Zutons (although specifically a cover of the version by Mark Ronson featuring Amy Winehouse), and Florence and the Machine's "Dog Days Are Over". Each song was released as a single, available for digital download, with two separate versions of "Don't Cry for Me Argentina" released—one by Chris Colfer (Kurt) and the other by Lea Michele (Rachel). "Valerie" and "(I've Had) The Time of My Life" are included on the fifth soundtrack album Glee: The Music, Volume 4, released on November 26, 2010, and "Hey, Soul Sister" was included on the seventh soundtrack album, Glee: The Music Presents the Warblers, released on April 19, 2011.

== Reception ==
=== Ratings and viewership ===
"Special Education" was first broadcast on November 30, 2010 in the United States on Fox. It received a 4.6/13 Nielsen rating/share in the 18–49 demographic, and attracted over 11.68 million American viewers during its initial airing, and thus won its time slot despite airing simultaneously with network specials, including Rudolph the Red-Nosed Reindeer on CBS, Christmas In Rockefeller Center on NBC, Dr. Seuss' How the Grinch Stole Christmas and Shrek the Halls on ABC, and CW's usual offering, One Tree Hill. The total viewership and ratings for this episode were up significantly from those of the previous episode, "Furt", which was watched by 10.41 million American viewers and acquired a 4.0/12 rating/share in the 18–49 demographic upon first airing on television on November 23, 2010.

In Canada, 2.32 million viewers watched the episode, ranking second for the week. In the UK, the episode was watched by 2.602 million viewers (2.218 million on E4, and 384,000 on E4+1), which made it the most-watched show on cable for the week.

=== Critical reception ===
"Special Education" received mixed reviews from television critics. The most enthusiastic reviewers were from The Atlantic, where both Kevin Fallon and Patrick Burns declared it the "best episode of Glee all season", and Meghan Brown suggested that the show should "just do competition episodes from now on". Aly Semigran of MTV was similarly laudatory, and said that the show was "back in top form"; she added that the episode "felt very reminiscent of the magic the first season provided".

Others were more tempered in their praise. James Poniewozik of Time said the episode was "grounded" and "solid-if-not-spectacular", and highlighted how Glee "has developed into a broad ensemble, where any of several characters is capable of taking the spotlight, even an originally comic-relief character like Brittany." Emily VanDerWerff of The A.V. Club and the Houston Chronicle's Bobby Hankinson both liked the episode—VanDerWerff gave it a "B+"—but they, like Erica Futterman of Rolling Stone who was less complimentary, were disappointed that it failed to measure up to the last time New Directions competed in Sectionals. VanDerWerff wrote, "When the show […] remains, at some level, a show about a bunch of kids who just love to sing and dance and maybe have wacky adventures on the side, it remains fundamentally strong, as it does tonight." She also stated, "The fact that the Warblers and New Directions tied, while probably necessary for whatever reason, is ridiculously anticlimactic and keeps this episode from an A− pretty much singlehandedly."

Amy Reiter of the Los Angeles Times was disappointed with almost everything, and said the episode "felt more like a long, slow letdown after a season of gleeful highs". She added, "New Directions' sectionals performance wasn't a total fumble, but it wasn't the touchdown you might've hoped for either", and of the long-awaited opportunity to see other members featured in competition: "the anticipated shining moment turned out to be so dull." Reiter was one of a very few critics to note the absence of cheerleading coach Sue Sylvester in the episode, and only when she lamented the "relative lack of humor". Futterman merely remarked on Sue's non-appearance in passing; she came to the conclusion that "we got a spazzy, unfocused hour at the expense of emotional investment", and though Anthony Benigno of the Daily News complimented the "solid acting", he also wrote that "this is the first time the show's started to feel genuinely boring as opposed to, you know, gleeful." He made a general complaint as well: "This show is starting to suffer in a big way from making the music secondary to the plot." Robert Canning of IGN gave the episode a 7.5 out of 10 rating. He said that the show "tried to make it all work, and while the hour was enjoyable enough, each storyline felt just a little bit shy of going from good to great."

A few reviewers remarked on how the Hipsters seemed to be a reflection of the New Directions crew in fifty years, with Futterman getting into specifics: "We see future Rachel start the number with a cane and future Mercedes break through to finish the song off with a riff, and it's hard not to be endeared to them." Poniewozik wrote that Rachel's "silent reminder to Kurt to smile on stage was a perfect, sweet little moment", a sentiment shared by Tim Stack of Entertainment Weekly. Poniewozik also noted that "Lea Michele had some of her strongest non-singing moments of the season by showing not just how Rachel dealt with her problems with Finn but with being on the periphery of the group." The storyline that featured the disintegration of the Rachel–Finn relationship, when commented on at all, was viewed unfavorably; VanDerWerff called it a "stupid twist".

Brown praised the addition of Fink as Lauren to New Directions, and declared, "I hope she's on the team for keeps", while Poniewozik was pleased that "the episode used Lauren for comedy without simply making her the butt of jokes". Brown also wrote, "Kurt's arc was subtler this week, and thereby about 50 times more interesting. I […] am impressed that Glee's handling his acclimation to Dalton so truthfully." Canning was similarly impressed, and called Kurt at Dalton "the most solid story" of the episode. There was little approval among reviewers for the "canary in a cage" metaphor in the scene between Kurt and Blaine at the end of the episode, with Kurt the "canary" in his new Dalton cage; Hankinson characterized it as "super ham-fisted", and others were nearly as harsh.

=== Music and performances ===
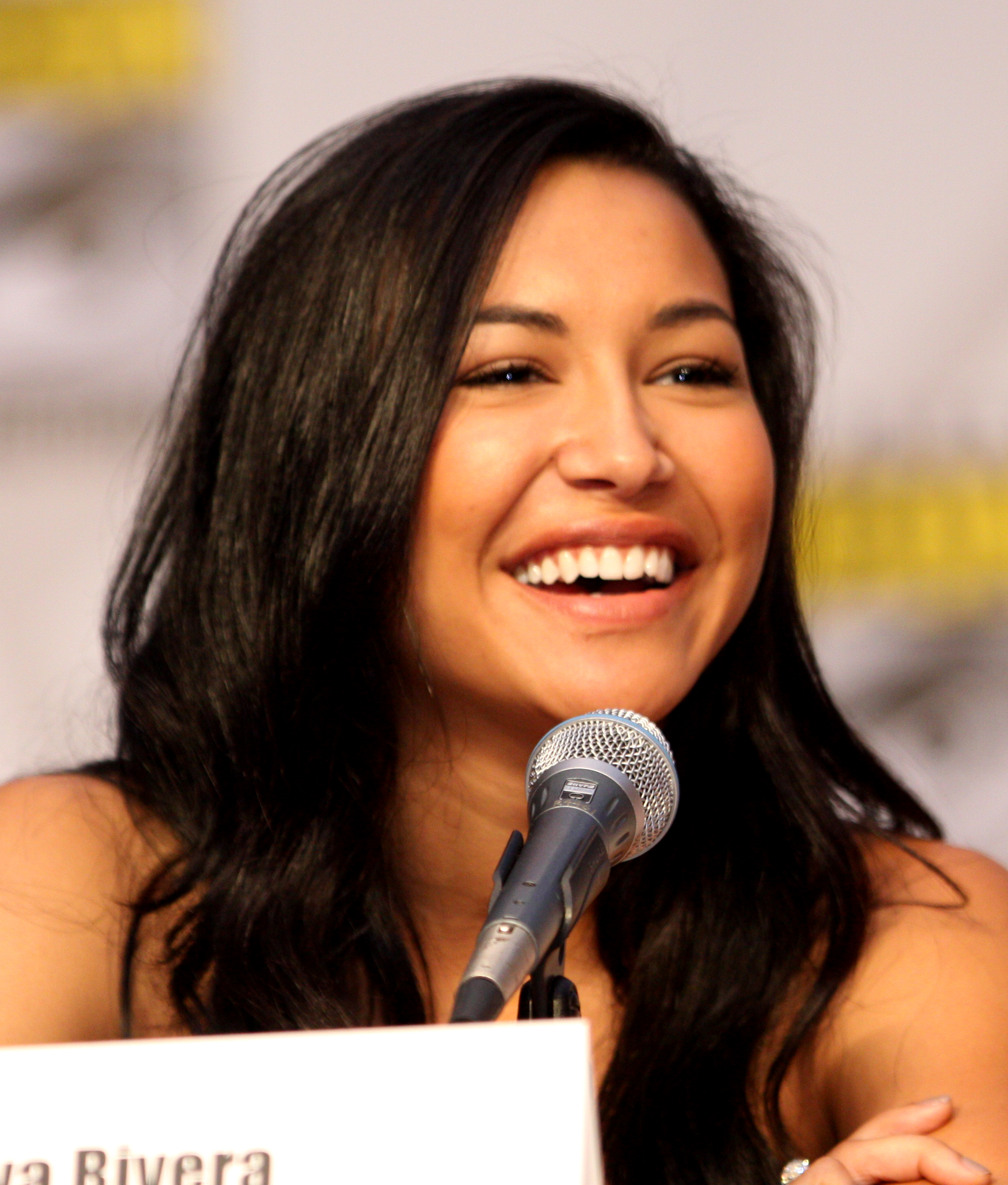
The solo by Santana (Rivera, pictured), her first on the show, garnered rave reviews.

The musical performances in this episode were mostly praised by critics, though there was little said about the quality of the abbreviated performance by the Hipsters in competition. There was near-universal approval for the first song heard, "Don't Cry For Me Argentina", which Stack called "totally beautiful" and gave an "A−"; he, like Burns, who said it was "fantastic", loved having "Rachel and Kurt get a chance to sing together". Jen Harper of BuddyTV echoed Kurt's words in the episode; she said "Rachel really is as talented as she is irritating", but wished she "didn't always look like she's crying while she's singing", and added that she was "really digging Kurt in a lower register". Futterman noted that Rachel, as is usual with her "power ballads", "uses the time to grapple with the latest obstacle to her future stardom, while we see Kurt deliver a clear, restrained take. Benigno called Michele's voice "astounding", and added that her solo alternated "with Kurt's audition with the Warblers, which is predictably outstanding", and gave the song a "B+". Even those who disliked the song or the composer were won over by the performance: Berk gave it three stars out of five, and Burns thought it was "fantastic"; both liked the song's tag-team presentation.

The performance of Train's "Hey, Soul Sister" by the Dalton Academy Warblers received even more praise than "Don't Cry For Me Argentina". Benigno called it flawless, and gave it an "A++", and Hanh Nguyen of Zap2it gave it her "top prize" of the night. Berk gave it four stars out of five, Burns said "the Warblers sounded fantastic and fun", and Harper said she loved it, and that, like the audience on the show, she "would have given it" a "standing ovation". Stack said he "sorta" hated the song "from sheer overexposure", but "Darren Criss sold it for me with his choreography and acting", and gave it a "B+". Pat Monahan, the lead singer of Train, said: "Loved it! I thought they did an amazing job."

The praise was more tepid for Sam and Quinn's "(I've Had) the Time of My Life". Benigno called it "solid", but added "overkill knocks it down to a solid B." Both Futterman and Stack said the number "fell a little flat", though Stack said the duo had "great physical chemistry". Fallon characterized it as an "adorable duet". Berk gave it five stars of five, his best grade for the episode, and called it "oozy, curdling perfection", while Reiter was the least impressed, and wrote that their "voices (and romantic interplay) seemed wan and thin."

The New Directions closing number at Sectionals, "Valerie", received the most commentary, with Santana's solo given enthusiastic praise, though Brittany and Mike's dancing was also lauded. Hankinson, who had tepidly called songs "nice" up to this point, shifted gears and said, "Then Santana burns the roof down with a rendition of Amy Winehouse's 'Valerie'. It was awesome." Raymund Flandez of The Wall Street Journal echoed that fervor: "But then Santana came on and killed. With an on-spot rendition of Mark Ronson/Amy Winehouse's 'Valerie,' and wearing a Snooki bun, Santana was electrifying behind the mic, in an energizing display that revved up the audience", and added, "Brittany and Mike's pas de deux rocked". Benigno opined that "Brittany and Mike Chang handle the moves (extraordinarily well), but the vocals here are what steal it. Naya Rivera (Santana) is completely outstanding on lead vocals, and I can't understand why she hasn't gotten a solo before this"; he gave it an "A". Stack was slightly less generous with an "A−", and wrote that it was a "great song choice for Santana"; he gave "bonus points for the phenomenal Mike/Brittany choreography", while Harper said that their dancing "totally made the song". Nguyen liked the dancing, but she was critical of how the song sounded, as she felt "it lacked something and didn't really feel worthy of the standing O", while Futterman said "Santana's sassy vocals are a perfect echo of Winehouse's, but the rest of the song feels a bit like a circus". Reiter felt the entire song "seemed kind of tacked on", both the dancing and Santana's solo.

"Dog Days Are Over" was the favorite song of several reviewers, including Hankinson, who said "it was the exact brand of high-energy jubilation that I love the most." Harper was also enthusiastic: "This performance for me represents what I like about New Directions—and why Kurt needs to come back asap. Everyone got to do their own individual thing, yet they still work really well as a group. I give it best song of the night." In Semigran's view, "From the cute choreographed claps to the unconventional (but oddly fitting) choice to have Tina and Mercedes sing the tune, I wish they'd save this one for regionals. It was a winner", while VanDerWerff wrote, " 'Dog Days Are Over' is right in this show's wheelhouse, so, naturally, it hits the song out of the park." Benigno gave the song a "B+", and Berk awarded three stars out of five, while Stack gave it an "A", and said series creator Ryan Murphy "chose the perfect gals to pull off this cover."

=== Chart history ===
Five of the seven cover versions released as singles debuted on the Billboard Hot 100, and appeared on other musical charts. The show's rendition of "Dog Days Are Over" debuted at number twenty-two on both the Hot 100 and Canadian Hot 100, and pushed the original version of the song by Florence and the Machine ahead of it to number twenty-one on the Hot 100, up from number fifty-eight in the previous week. The other songs on the Hot 100 were "Hey, Soul Sister" at number twenty-nine, which also made number thirty-two on the Canadian Hot 100; "(I've Had) The Time of My Life" at number thirty-eight, which also made number thirty-nine on the Canadian Hot 100; "Valerie" at number fifty-four, which also made number seventy on the Canadian Hot 100; and "Don't Cry for Me Argentina" in the Lea Michele version, at number ninety-seven.
