= Puckerman =

Puckerman may refer to:

- Jake Puckerman, fictional character
- Noah Puckerman, fictional character
