= A Very Glee Christmas =

- Glee episode
- Episode no.: Season 2 Episode 10
- Directed by: Alfonso Gomez-Rejon
- Written by: Ian Brennan
- Production code: 2ARC10
- Original air date: December 7, 2010

Guest appearances
- Iqbal Theba as Principal Figgins; Dot-Marie Jones as Shannon Beiste; Harry Shum, Jr. as Mike Chang; Chord Overstreet as Sam Evans; Darren Criss as Blaine Anderson; Jernard Burks as the mall Santa; Max Adler as Dave Karofsky; James Earl as Azimio; Ashley Fink as Lauren Zizes; Lauren Potter as Becky Jackson

Episode chronology
← Previous "Special Education"	Next → "The Sue Sylvester Shuffle"
- Glee season 2

"A Very Glee Christmas" is the tenth episode of the second season of the American musical television series Glee, and the thirty-second episode overall. It was written by series co-creator Ian Brennan, directed by Alfonso Gomez-Rejon, and premiered on Fox on December 7, 2010. It served as the mid-season finale of season two—nearly two months elapsed before the next episode was aired—and featured Artie (Kevin McHale) trying to keep his girlfriend Brittany's (Heather Morris) belief in Santa Claus intact, and Sue (Jane Lynch) rigging the faculty Secret Santa gift exchange so she gets all the gifts, though she later becomes a Grinch when the gifts are repossessed.

The episode features seven songs, two of which come from the television special How the Grinch Stole Christmas!. The creators of Glee received permission from the estate of Dr. Seuss for the use of characters from How the Grinch Stole Christmas!, but were not allowed to use them in promotional photographs. Most of the songs featured in the episode had been released on Glee: The Music, The Christmas Album four weeks prior to airing, including "Baby, It's Cold Outside", which debuted at number fifty-seven on the Billboard Hot 100 after the episode aired, despite not having been released separately as a single. "Welcome Christmas", the other song to chart after the episode aired, was the only song from the episode not on the album, but it was released as a single, and it debuted at number thirty-seven on the Canadian Hot 100.

The episode received generally positive reviews from critics, while the music, especially the rendition of "Baby, It's Cold Outside" as a duet between Kurt (Chris Colfer) and Blaine (Darren Criss), was extensively praised. Upon its initial airing, this episode was viewed by a hair under 11.07 million American viewers and received a 4.4/13 Nielsen rating/share in the 18–49 demographic. The total viewership and ratings for this episode were down from the previous episode, "Special Education", which was watched the week before by over 11.68 million American viewers and received a 4.6/13 rating/share in the 18–49 demographic.

== Plot ==
The William McKinley High School faculty hold a Secret Santa gift exchange, but cheerleading coach Sue Sylvester (Jane Lynch) tampers with the selection process to ensure that she receives all the gifts. Glee club director Will Schuester (Matthew Morrison) sends the club, New Directions, to carol around the school to raise money for a local homeless charity, but they are met with abuse from students and staff alike, and return empty-handed. At Dalton Academy in Westerville, Ohio, former New Directions member Kurt Hummel (Chris Colfer) sings a duet of "Baby, It's Cold Outside" with his friend Blaine Anderson (Darren Criss) to help him rehearse it for the Kings Island Christmas Spectacular. Will visits Kurt to seek his advice on a gift for Sue, and Kurt reveals that he has fallen in love with Blaine.

Glee club co-captain Rachel Berry (Lea Michele) twice attempts to make amends with her estranged boyfriend Finn Hudson (Cory Monteith), who is still upset that she cheated on him with his best friend Puck (Mark Salling), and he officially ends their relationship. Club member Artie Abrams (Kevin McHale) discovers that his girlfriend Brittany Pierce (Heather Morris) still believes in Santa Claus, and encourages the other members to visit a Christmas grotto to help reinforce her belief. To Artie's dismay, Brittany asks the grotto's Santa to restore Artie's ability to walk, which he agrees to do. Hoping to maintain her faith, Artie convinces football coach Shannon Beiste (Dot-Marie Jones) to go to Brittany's house dressed as Santa and explain that this particular wish cannot be granted. Santa's visit is not a success, and Brittany loses her Christmas spirit, but she later finds a gift for Artie underneath her Christmas tree—a ReWalk mobility device that allows him to stand and walk with the assistance of forearm crutches—which he demonstrates for the glee club. As Brittany tells the group that it must have come from Santa, Coach Beiste secretly observes the demonstration and smiles.

Will and the other faculty members discover Sue's deception and reclaim their gifts with the intention of donating them to the homeless charity. Incensed, Sue dresses as the Grinch, with her favorite cheerleader Becky Jackson (Lauren Potter) as Max, and steals back the presents while she vandalizes the choir room's Christmas decorations. The club members are stunned by the theft and destruction, but Will encourages them to give a private performance for the faculty, which proves successful and garners many charitable donations. Sue overhears their performance of "Welcome Christmas", and she comes to regret her actions. She returns the presents to Will at his apartment, and brings the New Directions members to decorate a new Christmas tree and spread holiday cheer.

== Production ==
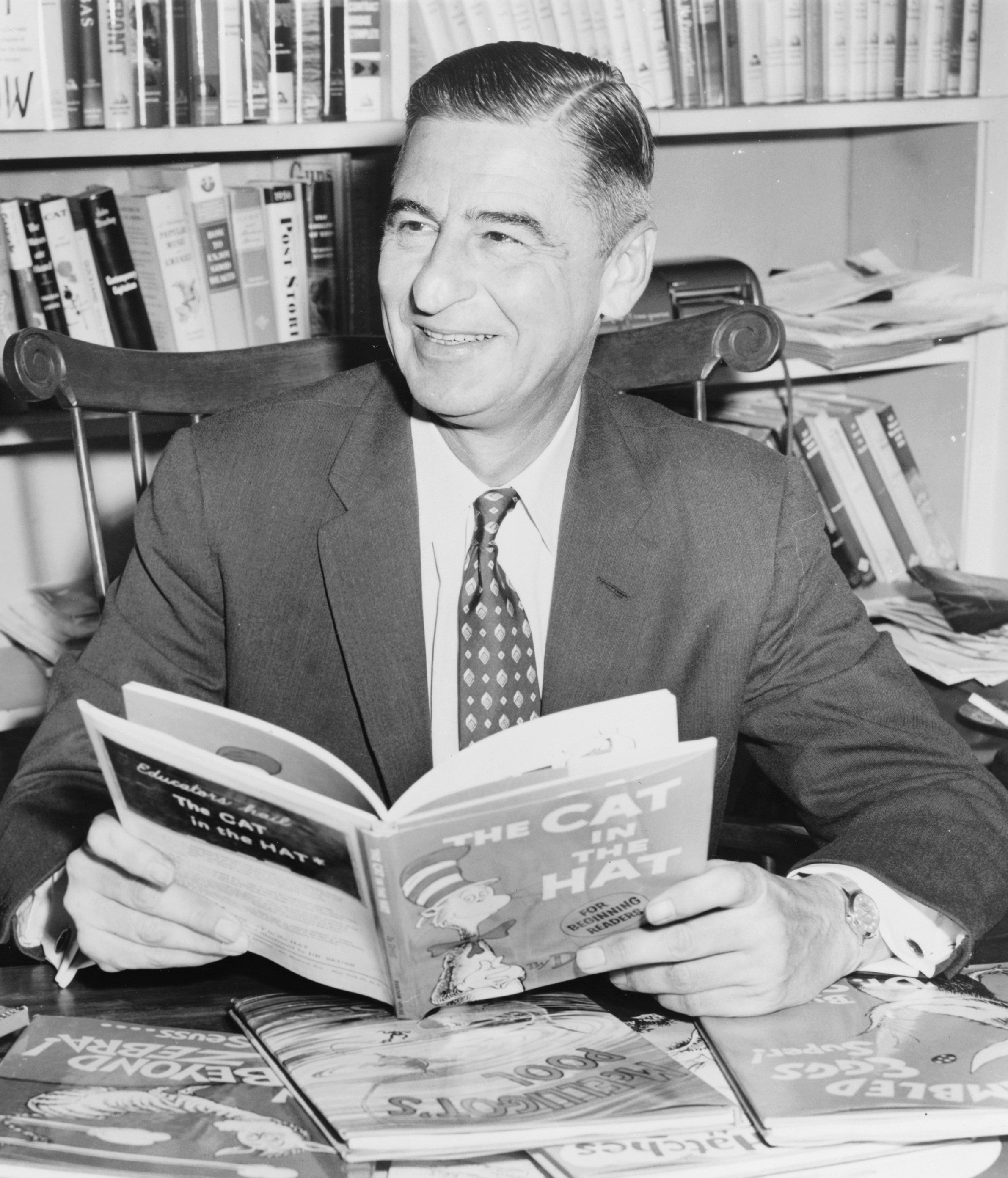
This episode makes use of several characters and events from How the Grinch Stole Christmas! by Dr. Seuss (pictured).

The episode was written by series co-creator Ian Brennan and directed by Alfonso Gomez-Rejon. The creators of Glee received permission from the estate of Dr. Seuss for the use of characters from How the Grinch Stole Christmas!, but were not allowed to use them in promotional photographs.

Recurring characters in this episode include glee club members Mike Chang (Harry Shum, Jr.), Sam Evans (Chord Overstreet) and Lauren Zizes (Ashley Fink), school bullies Dave Karofsky (Max Adler) and Azimio (James Earl), football coach Shannon Beiste, cheerleader Becky Jackson (Lauren Potter), Principal Figgins (Iqbal Theba), and Blaine Anderson (Darren Criss) lead singer of the Dalton Academy Warblers.

"A Very Glee Christmas" features cover versions of seven Christmas songs: "The Most Wonderful Day of the Year" from Rudolph the Red-Nosed Reindeer, performed by New Directions; "We Need a Little Christmas" from Mame, with Amber Riley on lead vocals; Frank Loesser's "Baby, It's Cold Outside", sung by Criss and Colfer; "Merry Christmas Darling" by The Carpenters, sung by Michele, "Last Christmas" by Wham!, sung by Michele and Monteith; and "Welcome Christmas" from How the Grinch Stole Christmas!, also by New Directions. Another song from How the Grinch Stole Christmas! is heard in the episode—an arrangement of "You're a Mean One, Mr. Grinch", soundtracked by k.d. lang, and with the lyric "Mister Grinch" modified to "Sue the Grinch". "Last Christmas" had been released previously as a charity single in late 2009, and is included on Glee: The Music, The Christmas Album. "Welcome Christmas" was released as a single, available for digital download, separately from the album, which otherwise includes all remaining tracks and six additional songs not heard in the episode; a different version of "You're a Mean One, Mr. Grinch" was recorded for the album, which featured Morrison along with lang and used the original "Mister Grinch" lyric.

== Reception ==
=== Ratings ===
"A Very Glee Christmas" was first broadcast on December 7, 2010, in the United States on Fox. It earned a 4.4/13 Nielsen rating/share in the 18–49 demographic, and received a hair under 11.07 million American viewers during its initial airing. It won the 18–49 demographic against an NCIS rerun on CBS, Minute to Win It on NBC, the A Charlie Brown Christmas special on ABC, and One Tree Hill on CW. The total viewership and ratings for this episode were down from those of the previous episode, "Special Education", which was watched by over 11.68 million American viewers and received a 4.6/13 rating/share in the 18–49 demographic upon first airing on television on November 30, 2010.

In Canada, 2.37 million viewers watched the episode, which ranked fifth for the week. This was a slight increase over the 2.32 million viewers who watched "Special Education" the previous week, though it had ranked second in that week. In Australia and the UK, the episode aired after Christmas, in the new year. The episode's Australian broadcast, on February 7, 2011, drew 769,000 viewers, which made Glee the seventeenth most-watched program of the night; it failed to place in the top fifty in the weekly viewership rankings. Here, viewership registered a steep 23% fall from the previous episode, "Special Education", which attracted 1.02 million viewers when it aired on January 31, 2011, and ranked twenty-seventh for the week. In the UK, the episode was watched by 2.20 million viewers (1.89 million on E4, and 315,000 on E4+1), which made it the most-watched show on cable for the week, but the lowest-viewed episode of the season so far, and down over 15% from "Special Education" in the previous week, which received 2.60 million viewers.

=== Critical reception ===
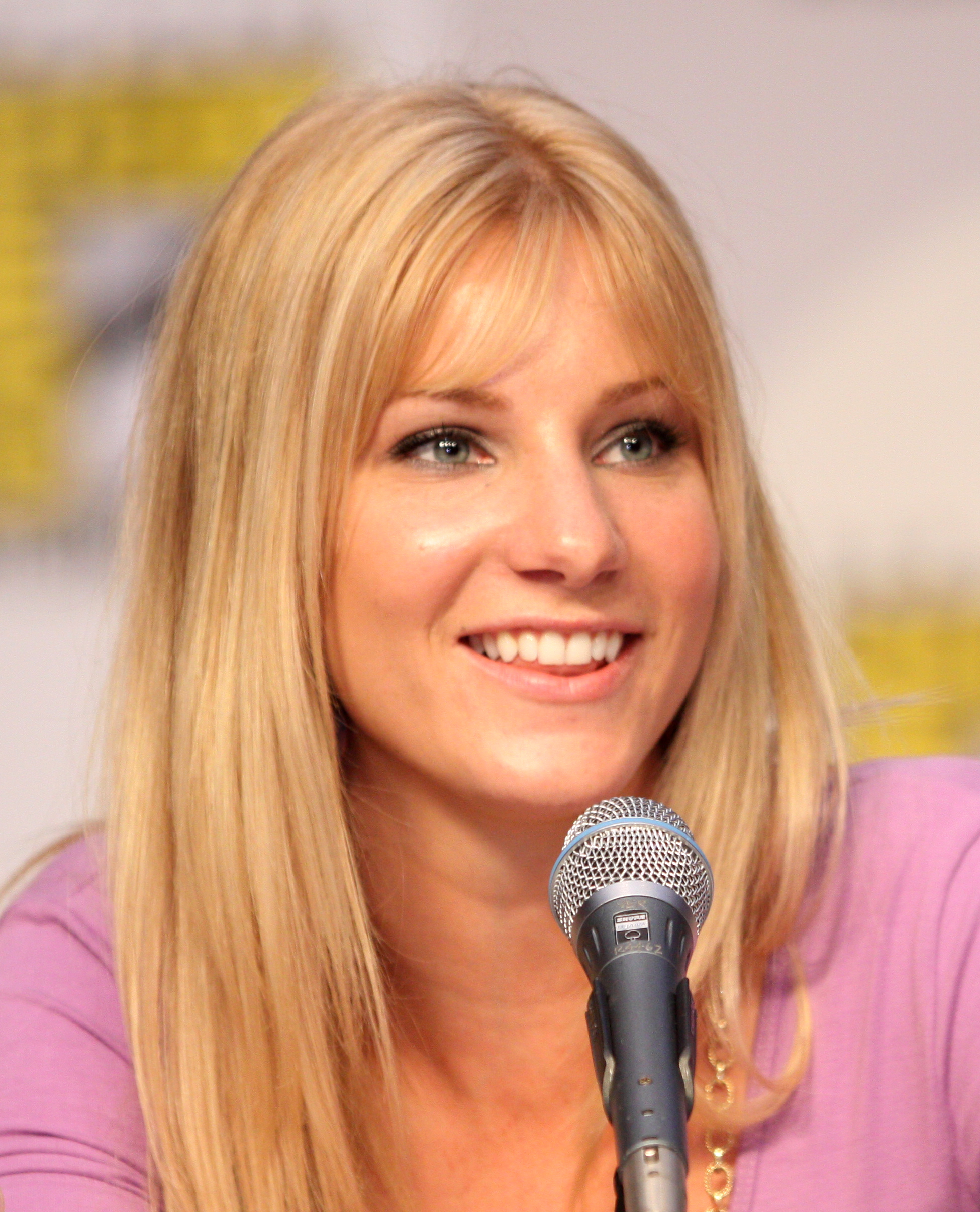
The belief of Brittany (Heather Morris, pictured) in Santa Claus was called "the linchpin of the hour" by Joel Keller.

The episode received generally positive reviews from critics, most of whom seemed to have judged it on different criteria from their normal because it was a holiday episode. The Atlantic's Kevin Fallon may have called it "sickly oversweet", but maintained "that's exactly what you want at Christmas". His colleague Patrick Burns wrote, "Holiday episodes tread a dangerous line between sweet and saccharine, but this episode splits the difference perfectly." The title of the article they wrote with Meghan Brown, "Glee Does Christmas: Cheesy but Charming", found echoes in other reviews: both Amy Reiter of the Los Angeles Times and Anthony Benigno of the Daily News also thought the episode was quite cheesy, but Benigno characterized it as "the good kind of cheese; the kind you'll eat for antipasti before grandma and grandpa bring out the roast beef on Christmas dinner", and Reiter's bottom line was that it "may not have been the most wonderful episode of the year, but it did feature moments that twinkled and shined like the lovingly trimmed family tree." Time's James Poniewozik was less enthusiastic when he noted that Glee delivered an episode "that touched on all the requisite holiday bases but that felt perfunctory", and added that it was "generally ho-ho-hum". Robert Canning of IGN gave it a "great" 8 out of 10, but stated that "the episode as a whole was lacking just a bit to turn it into an absolute classic", and The A.V. Club's Emily St. James gave the episode a "B−" and wrote, "I guess I'd say that I thought the episode worked moment-to-moment, without working as an overall narrative", but also stated that it was "positively filled with stupid moments".

Joel Keller of AOL TV wrote that "the linchpin of the hour was Brittany's belief in Santa Claus." The New York Post's Jarett Wieselman called it "adorably realized by actress Heather Morris", and Canning said she "perfectly played up Brittany's innocence and joy surrounding everything Santa". Brown was less enthusiastic, and wrote that she was tiring of the "look how dumb yet kind-hearted Brittany is" plots. Keller approved of the Artie and Brittany coupling, and said it was "way more fun to watch than Rachel and Finn and all their angst", and Canning felt that the episode's heart was Artie working to keep Brittany from becoming disillusioned about Santa. He also wrote, "shining in this storyline was Dot Jones as Coach Beiste. Her scene as Santa, and then her knowing expression as she watched Artie walk, were the best moments of the episode." Burns agreed: "Coach Beiste's performance as the Santa Claus bearer of harsh reality was quite moving. It's nice to see her get to show her acting chops and refreshing to see her character's vulnerability." Poniewozik also agreed, and said Jones "has been remarkable", "taking every ridiculous moment Glee has thrown at her and finding the true emotion at the core of the absurdity, which is what Glee at its best does." However, he was disappointed by how the storyline played out: "it didn't feel right that after the story the episode built around Brittany, it then felt that we needed to see Artie on his feet for it to be a truly happy ending."

Bobby Hankinson of the Houston Chronicle was critical of the "really tedious Rachel/Finn back and forth", and Canning wrote that the "only thing that really dragged the episode down was Rachel trying to win Finn back". Keller asked rhetorically, "Do we still care about Rachel and Finn at this point?", and later stated, "nice as 'Last Christmas' was, I'm glad Finn didn't fall for it." Benigno noted that Finn's few lines in the episode really counted.

Critics had widely divergent views of Sue's storyline. Keller wrote, "They made Sue Sylvester into a cartoon character." Though he called Sue's destruction of the choir room "a fun little parody to watch", he added, "in the grand scheme of what was a pretty damn good episode, it was too much of a distraction", and worried that the role of Sue was becoming "a big fat joke". While Canning also noted the shift in tone "from despicable Sue to cartoony evil Sue", he enjoyed her "attempt to hijack Secret Santa", and said it was "another fun reason to love to hate Sue Sylvester". Hankinson felt that the Grinch was "the perfect touchstone for the heartless Ms. Sylvester and Jane Lynch's lanky frame made the physical humor (think gliding around the base of the tree on her belly) really sing." Poniewozik called Sue's transformation "pretty amusing to watch", admitted that he doubted he would "have been able to resist the urge to put the rangy Jane Lynch in that classic role" and called Brittany as Cindy Lou Who "unexpected, clever and surprisingly touching". Several reviewers commented favorably on Becky playing Max, including Canning, who wrote "it was all worth it to realize Becky is and always will be the Max to Sue's Grinch", and Entertainment Weekly's Tim Stack declared, "I totally love how Becky is becoming Sue’s little minion. It’s both adorable and hilarious."

=== Music and performances ===
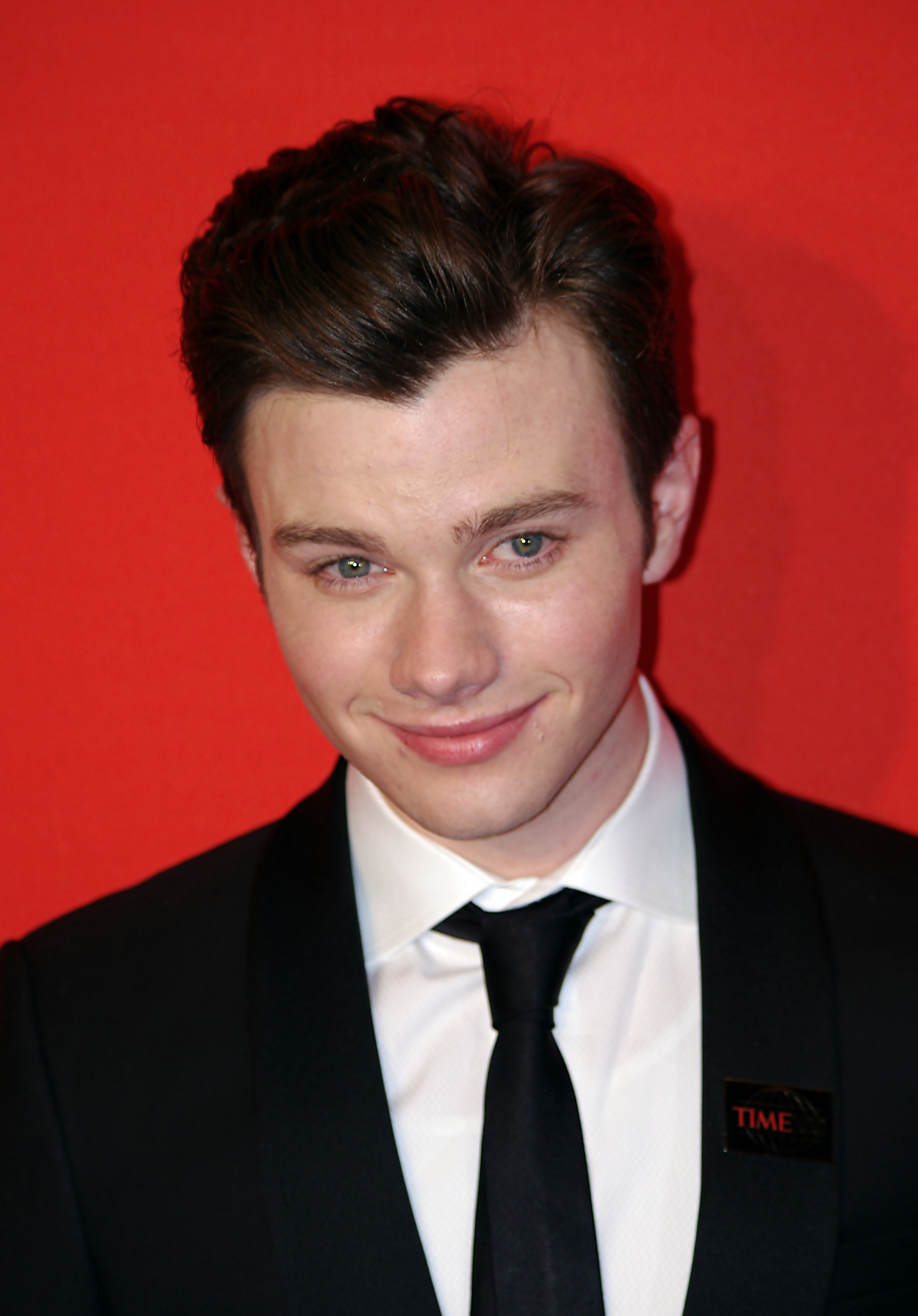
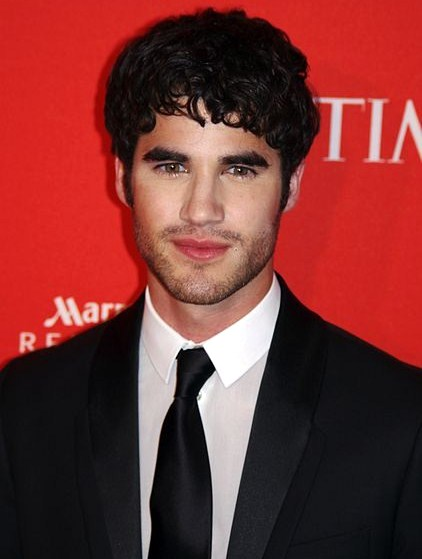
The duet "Baby, It's Cold Outside", sung by Kurt (Colfer, left) and Blaine (Criss, right), was the most enthusiastically received song of the episode.

The episode's musical performances received generally good marks, though some more than others. Canning described it as "an average song selection", and wrote: "There are literally thousands of holiday songs to choose from and the ones sung in 'A Very Glee Christmas' could have used some more of Santa's magic." Some reviewers commented on the songs themselves rather than the performances, including Wham!'s "Last Christmas", which Canning described as "a terrible song in any season", while Jen Harper of BuddyTV stated that she loved Wham!

Benigno called "The Most Wonderful Day of the Year" a "perfectly pleasant opening that the Gleeks sing while they decorate their tree". Canning deemed it "the episode's most successful song" and added that it "would have been a great tone setter if the rest of the episode hadn't focused on heartbreak, hate and grinches". Harper said that the song "got the episode off on the right holiday foot", and Stack gave it a "B" and wrote that its performance "almost felt like the beginning of a real holiday musical. It was a little cheesy but also kind of charming and sweet." The next song, "We Need a Little Christmas", Benigno declared "fun but too short". He added, "If there's one thing this number teaches us, it's that Mercedes is being woefully misused on this show and can carry a number as well, if not better than she can finish one." Stack said that the "little taste" included in the show "sounded promising", and Harper "totally loved this song".

Kurt and Blaine's duet on "Baby, It's Cold Outside" received many more reviews than the other songs, and the greatest praise. Wieselman called it his "far and away favorite" song of the episode. Stack declared it the "complete and total highlight of the episode and one of the best moments of the second season". He gave it an "A+". Hankinson said it was the show's "best musical number", and described it as "well-performed, sweet and wonderfully choreographed"; he added: "It was bold, without being gimmicky". The Atlantic's Meghan Brown and Patrick Burns were both enthusiastic: Brown said "Kurt's sweetly sexy duet with Blaine was near-perfect" and "the vocals and choreography gave Chris Colfer and Darren Criss a real chance to shine", while Burns called it "adorable". Erica Futterman of Rolling Stone wrote that it was "full of sweet harmonies and has an ideal undercurrent of romantic tension", though Harper "wasn't feeling any chemistry between them"; she felt the performance was "a little overacted", but noted that "their voices seem to like each other". Benigno was also less enthusiastic; he gave the song a "B−" and felt there was "something missing" from the rendition: "these two could have sang this number in their sleep and it kind of sounds like they did".

Rachel's performance of "Merry Christmas, Darling" had a good reception, but with caveats. Futterman wrote that "she nails the sentiment with her restrained take—but we'd love to move past Rachel's phase of singing Lite-FM ballads while watching everyone in bliss around her". Benigo called it "nice and fun" and Michele's voice "still a thing of wonder", and he gave the song an "A−", but added he was weary of "Rachel In Anguish Face". Stack gave it a "B" and said Michele "did a great job as usual", but noted it wasn't a favored holiday song. Of the reviewers who actually discussed Rachel and Finn's performance of "Last Christmas", both Benigno and Stack were enthusiastic and gave grades of "B+" and "A−" respectively. The former called it "one of the more fun songs" in the episode, and the latter described the performance as "really fun and had great production design". Futterman felt that Michele's vocals were "a bit diva-esque for the simple pop tune", but noted that there were "sweet moments".

Of the two songs from How the Grinch Stole Christmas! featured in the episode, the first, a voiceover vocal of "You're a Mean One, Mr. Grinch" sung by k.d. lang, based on a version of the song by artist Aimee Mann, as Sue wreaks havoc on the choir room, confused some reviewers, who thought that it was sung by Lynch herself. Benigno was one of these, though he said it was "thoroughly enjoyable", gave the song a "B+", and approved of the change in lyrics from "Mr. Grinch" to "Sue the Grinch". Harper also approved of the change, and admitted she thought Lynch had sung it until Google set her straight. Futterman called the song a "weirdly fitting moment" that "nevertheless fell a bit short of being fully realized". The second song, "Welcome Christmas", was welcomed by reviewers: Benigno described it as "really, really lovely" and gave it an "A". Harper cheered, and noted that the song "was sung very much like a real glee club, without people getting to showboat individually". Futterman characterized it as a "note-perfect performance", and wrote: "The layered harmonies and simple sentiment—'Christmas will always be, just so long as we have glee!'—tie the episode up with a bow, smoothing out the bumps that came before it."

=== Chart history ===
Most of the Christmas songs featured in the episode had been released on Glee: The Music, The Christmas Album four weeks prior to airing. There were two exceptions: "Welcome Christmas" did not appear on the album but was released as a single, and "Last Christmas", which was on the album but had originally been released as a charity single a full year before the episode aired. The top song from the show on the Billboard Hot 100 was neither of these: "Baby, It's Cold Outside" debuted at number fifty-seven once the episode aired, despite not having been released separately as a single; it had jumped from number one hundred thirty to number twenty-seven on Billboard's Digital Song chart that same week, and debuted at number fifty-three on the Canadian Hot 100. "Welcome Christmas" debuted at number fifty-nine on the Hot 100, and at number thirty-seven on the Canadian Hot 100. "Last Christmas", when it charted in December 2009, debuted at number sixty-three on the Hot 100, and number sixty-two on the Canadian Hot 100, but in December 2010 reappeared at number thirty-five on the Digital Songs chart alongside "Baby, It's Cold Outside", "Welcome Christmas", and two other songs from the episode. The album itself reached number three on the Billboard 200 chart; it sold over one million copies, and was certified platinum.
