= Christmas EP =

Christmas EP may refer to:

- Christmas EP (Mary Margaret O'Hara EP), 1991
- Christmas (Delta Goodrem EP), 2012
- Christmas (Pet Shop Boys EP)
- Christmas (Low EP)
- Christmas EP, by Seven Nations
- Christmas EP, by Aaron Shust, 2009
- Christmas EP, by The Fray
- Christmas, an EP by Jimmy Eat World

== See also ==
- Christmas Album (disambiguation)
