= Christmas Songs =

Christmas Songs may refer to:

- Christmas Songs (Bad Religion EP), 2013
- Christmas Songs (Diana Krall album), 2005
- Christmas Songs (Jars of Clay album), 2007
- Christmas Songs (Mel Tormé album), 1992
- Christmas Songs (Nora Aunor album), 1972
- Christmas Songs by Sinatra, a 1948 album by Frank Sinatra
- Mario Lanza Sings Christmas Songs, a 1951 album by Mario Lanza
- Christmas music, music associated with the Christmas season

== Lists of Christmas songs ==
- List of best-selling Christmas singles in the United States
- List of carols at the Nine Lessons and Carols, King's College Chapel
- List of Christmas carols
- List of Christmas hit singles in the United Kingdom
- List of Filipino Christmas carols and songs
- List of popular Christmas singles in the United States

== See also ==
- Christmas Song (disambiguation)
