= Glee: The Music, The Christmas Album =

Soundtrack album by the cast of the American television series Glee

Soundtrack album by Glee Cast
- Released: November 9, 2010
- Recorded: 2009 ("Last Christmas"), October 2010
- Studios: Chalice Recording Studios (Hollywood, California); Henson Recording Studios (Los Angeles, California); EastWest Studios (Hollywood); Masterplan Studios (Stockholm, Sweden); Airshow Mastering, Inc. (Boulder, Colorado)
- Genres: Christmas; Soundtrack
- Length: 38:42
- Label: Columbia / 20th Century Fox TV
- Producers: Adam Anders; Peer Åström; Ryan Murphy

Glee Cast chronology
Glee: The Music, The Rocky Horror Glee Show (2010)	Glee: The Music, The Christmas Album (2010)	Glee: The Music, Volume 4 (2010)

Glee: The Music, The Christmas Album is the fourth soundtrack album by the cast of the American musical television series Glee, produced by Ryan Murphy and Adam Anders. The album was released digitally on November 9, 2010, with physical copies available from November 16, 2010. It accompanies the second season episode "A Very Glee Christmas", which aired on December 7, 2010. Dante Di Loreto and Brad Falchuk serve as the album's executive producers. The album debuted at the top position of the Billboard Soundtracks chart, and peaked at number three on the Billboard 200. Songs from the album also landed on various different record charts across the United States, Canada, and the United Kingdom.

Critical reception was mixed; the majority of critics praised the cover versions of "Baby, It's Cold Outside", performed by Chris Colfer and guest star Darren Criss, and "God Rest Ye Merry Gentlemen", performed by Lea Michele, Amber Riley, Jenna Ushkowitz, Dianna Agron and Naya Rivera. There was also appreciation for the vocals of various cast members, particularly Riley. The original arrangements produced by Adam Anders and Peer Åström received more negative comments, with reviews criticizing the stylistic choices of some of the cover songs, as did the delivery of some songs performed by Michele. The album also features a cover of "You're a Mean One, Mr. Grinch" performed by Matthew Morrison and guest vocalist k.d. lang.

== Background and production ==
The musical comedy-drama television show Glee debuted on Fox in 2009, and released accompanying singles and albums. Prior to Glee: The Music, The Christmas Album, the cast had released six albums or EPs in the United States, all of which were commercially successful. Three of these topped the Billboard 200 albums chart, and all five released in the United Kingdom reached the top five of the Official UK albums chart. The Glee Cast did not have a Christmas episode nor release a Christmas album during the first season of the show.

In its second season, Glee aired the Christmas episode, "A Very Glee Christmas", on December 7, 2010, on Fox. The album had reached the top of the iTunes download chart before the episode aired. The cast began recording the Christmas episode in November 2010, but had recorded the songs for the album several weeks prior, though they had not been told what the songs were for; Amber Riley, who played Mercedes Jones, told TV Guide: "Everything goes so fast that there's no time to explain anything to us ... We're recording Christmas songs, and then one day they mention there's going to be an album. We were like, 'Huh?'" The album was produced by Adam Anders and Glee creator Ryan Murphy and executive produced by Glee executives Dante Di Loreto and Brad Falchuk, with songs produced by Anders and Peer Åström.

"A Very Glee Christmas" features seven songs, six of which are included on Glee: The Music, The Christmas Album. The six included tracks are "We Need a Little Christmas", "You're a Mean One, Mr. Grinch", "Merry Christmas Darling", "Baby, It's Cold Outside", "Last Christmas", and "The Most Wonderful Day of the Year" (also known as "Island of Misfit Toys", from Rudolph the Red-Nosed Reindeer); "Welcome Christmas" (from How the Grinch Stole Christmas!) was performed in the episode but not included on the album, while six additional songs not featured in the episode are included on the album. Reviewing the episode for Time, James Poniewozik felt that while some of the songs were enjoyable set pieces, they were not integrated well into the story, suggesting that a variety special may have been a better format to present the Christmas songs – Glee's third season Christmas episode, "Extraordinary Merry Christmas", was styled as a variety special.

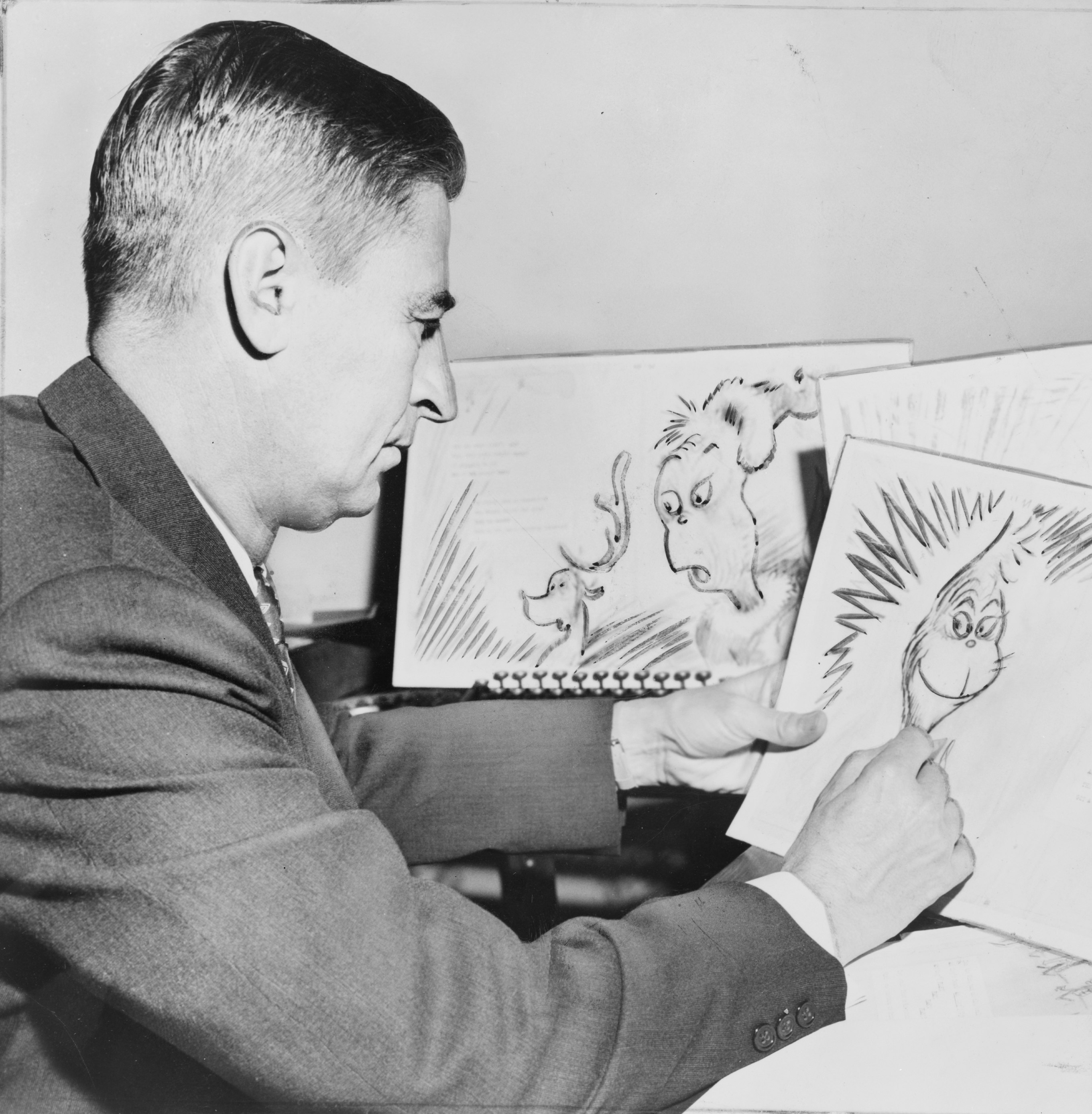
The Glee 2010 Christmas episode features elements of the story of How the Grinch Stole Christmas!, using several songs from the 1966 television movie.

In the "A Very Glee Christmas" episode, the six songs used on the album are sung in various situations, though not all are connected to the story. The episode incorporates some of the plot elements of Dr. Seuss's How the Grinch Stole Christmas!, using songs from the 1966 television special adaptation of the story in similar scenes. In the episode, "The Most Wonderful Day of the Year" is sung at the start of the episode as the main characters, kids in a high school glee club, decorate a Christmas tree with stolen ornaments. In the episode itself the song is sung by the characters: Artie Abrams, Sam Evans, Quinn Fabray, Brittany S. Pierce, and Tina Cohen-Chang with the New Directions, but in the album recording Quinn Fabray's part is sung by the character of Kurt Hummel. "You're a Mean One, Mr. Grinch" is performed as antagonist Sue Sylvester, dressed like the Grinch, destroys the glee club's Christmas decorations.

"We Need a Little Christmas" is performed by the glee club carolling at their school, but the song is abruptly cut-off in the episode when they are heckled. "Baby, It's Cold Outside" is performed at a different private school by characters Kurt Hummel and Blaine Anderson; the performance is followed by glee club director Will Schuester visiting the school to ask Kurt's advice. Like "Baby, It's Cold Outside", main character Rachel Berry's song, "Merry Christmas Darling", is also sung without much context, standing on a stage with a Christmas scene behind. "Last Christmas" is a duet between Rachel and her love interest Finn Hudson, and was more strongly integrated into their ongoing relationship plot.

Canadian singer-songwriter k.d. lang makes a featured appearance with Matthew Morrison (Will Schuester) on the track "You're a Mean One, Mr. Grinch". Guest stars Darren Criss (Blaine Anderson) and Chord Overstreet (Sam Evans) make vocal appearances on "Baby, It's Cold Outside" and "The Most Wonderful Day of the Year", respectively.

The songs, as is typical for Glee, were chosen by Murphy with assistance from music supervisor PJ Bloom. On December 7, 2010, Bloom was interviewed about the process of producing the music. Bloom said that the Glee writers knew they wanted to incorporate the story of the Grinch in the episode, and so including "You're a Mean One, Mr. Grinch" was an obvious song choice. He noted that "sometimes the songs drive the plot concepts", saying that Murphy is a big fan of George Michael, and so chose to have the characters perform "Last Christmas". Similarly, they felt that "Jingle Bells" was the most Christmas-y song, prompting its inclusion. Bloom acknowledged that the album "pukes Christmas", proudly saying that Glee had never tried to be subtle.

The song "O Holy Night", which is included on the album but was not featured in the episode, was later performed in the Glee fourth season episode "Swan Song", again by Lea Michele (Rachel Berry). Michele re-recorded the song in 2019 for her own Christmas album, Christmas in the City. She worked with Glee musical producer Adam Anders on the album, who encouraged her to include the song; Michele was initially hesitant to record it, thinking she was not as good vocally anymore at that point and that it would be hard to replicate a Glee track. However, upon her album's release, she said that she was "even more proud of [her 2019] version than [her Glee version]." Morrison also revisited his song, "You're a Mean One, Mr. Grinch", in later years, when he played the Grinch in NBC's 2020 Dr. Seuss' The Grinch Musical Live! Christmas special.

== Music ==
Anders, Åström, and, on some songs, Nikki Hassman, arranged many of the songs of the album. The traditional song "God Rest Ye Merry Gentlemen" was performed mostly a cappella, and "Angels We Have Heard on High" was given gospel elements, while popular Christmas track "Baby, It's Cold Outside" retained its soft jazz style. The mashup "Deck the Rooftop" was an energetic rearrangement of traditional songs "Deck the Halls" and "Up on the Housetop", with choral ad-libs, while "Last Christmas" is removed from its 1980s stylings and less upbeat. Bill Lamb of About.com felt the hymns "God Rest Ye Merry Gentlemen" and "O Holy Night" were respectful and reverent versions.

On the album release, the song "You're A Mean One, Mr. Grinch" is performed with its original lyrics; in the episode, the opening lyric was changed from "Mr. Grinch" to "Sue the Grinch" (referring to character Sue Sylvester). The singers of the song "The Most Wonderful Day of the Year" are also different between episode and album; in the episode, Dianna Agron (Quinn Fabray) has featured vocals, and Chris Colfer (Kurt Hummel) does not, while on the album, Agron's vocals are absent and Colfer has vocals included. Mark Salling (Puck) also sings on the track in the episode, and while he was named on the song in the album's track listing announcement, he is not credited in the liner notes. (Note: Ausiello's feature includes a credit for Salling on "The Most Wonderful Day of the Year" which is not present in the album liner notes.)

== Release ==
The album's track listing was revealed in an exclusive feature by Michael Ausiello for Entertainment Weekly on October 25, 2010; Assignment X noted that "for once, the [Glee album] features more songs than are actually featured on the show." Glee: The Music, The Christmas Album was released digitally in the US and UK on November 9, 2010, almost a month ahead of the Christmas episode airing. A Glee Christmas card featuring the cast in ugly Christmas sweaters was released to accompany and promote the album. The album songs were also made available to listen to on the Glee Myspace page before physical copies could be purchased. In the US, the physical album was released on November 16, 2010; in the UK, it was released on November 29, 2010, though the second season of Glee did not begin airing in the UK until 2011. The cast of Glee performed during the semi-final of The X Factor in the UK on December 5, 2010, and promoted the album release there.

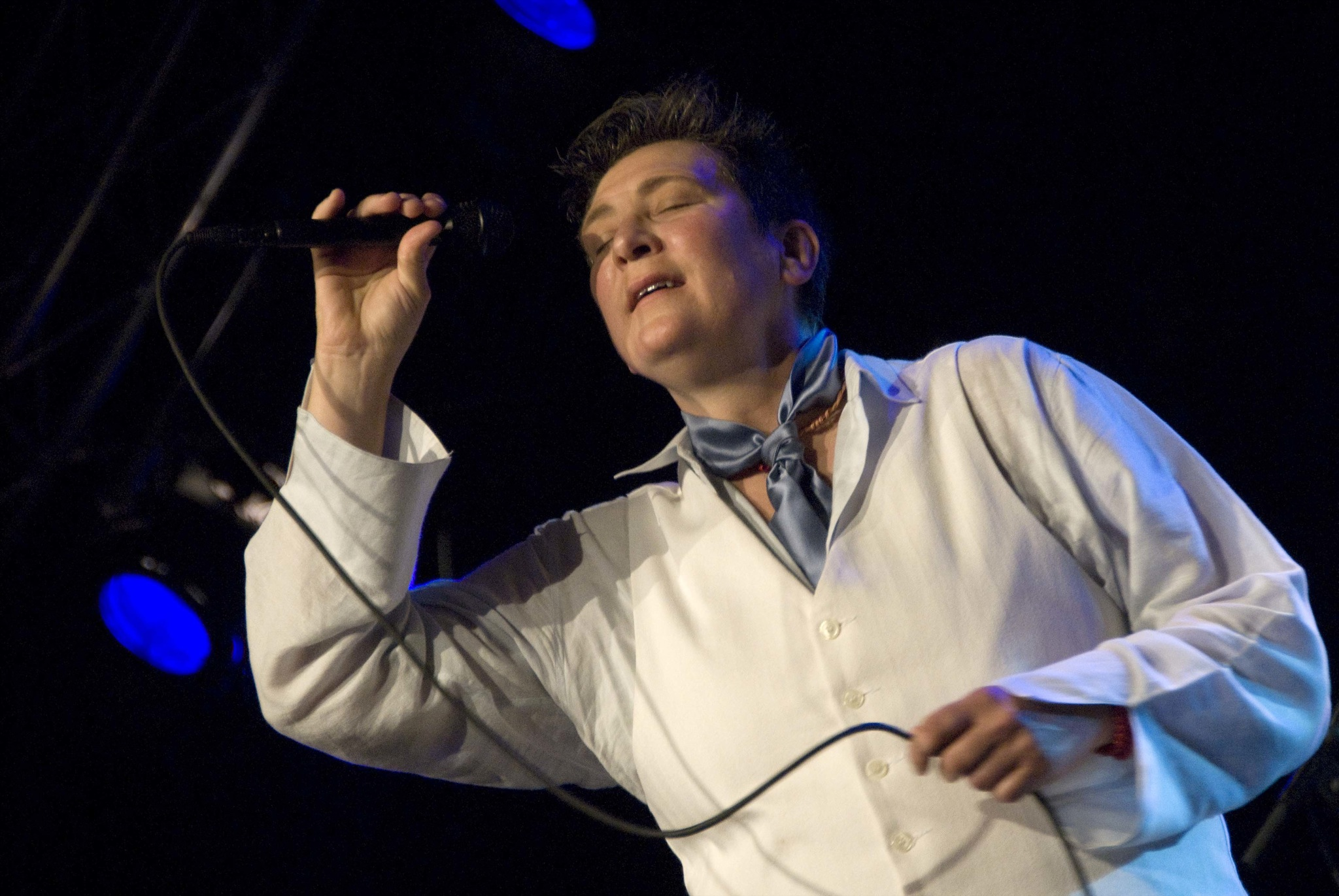
Singer-songwriter k.d. lang (pictured in 2008) features on "You're a Mean One, Mr. Grinch".

Lang's involvement on the album was not publicized, nor was lang referenced in the episode; critics and viewers were uncertain who was singing, both on the album and in the episode, with many believing it to be Jane Lynch (Sue Sylvester), who is in the relevant scene, while others proposed Dot-Marie Jones (Coach Beiste) or Heather Morris (Brittany Pierce), whose characters are also involved in the storyline. Kevin Fallon of The Atlantic said that to use a guest vocalist when there were these three singers in the cast available that would make sense, and then to not advertise the guest, was "downright puzzling". When the episode premiered, lang used the song to announce her forthcoming album Sing It Loud; when Sing It Loud was released in July 2011, lang praised Glee for its gay representation.

The Glee cover of Wham!'s "Last Christmas" featured in the second-season episode and on the album had been previously released on November 24, 2009, as a charity single exclusive to the iTunes Store; part of the proceeds went to the Grammy Foundation to fund school education programs. This single marked the first appearance of the song on the Billboard Hot 100, reaching number sixty-three. (Note: "Last Christmas" had previously appeared on the Billboard Country chart, covered by Taylor Swift in 2007.)

The song "Welcome Christmas", featured in the episode but not on the album, was instead released as a digital download single on December 14, 2010.

== Critical reception ==
Professional ratings
Review scores
Source	Rating
About.com	4/5 stars
AllMusic	3/5 stars
The Detroit News	B
Entertainment Weekly	B+
Philadelphia Daily News	C+
The Salt Lake Tribune	B

Glee: The Music, The Christmas Album was met with mixed criticism upon its release: The Detroit News gave the album a "B" rating, with Andrew Leahey of AllMusic and Tanner Stransky of Entertainment Weekly also positive towards it, though they noted the unconventional musical theatre and bubblegum pop stylistic elements to the music. Brett Berk of Vanity Fair and Jonathan Takiff of the Philadelphia Daily News found the album's style distinctly negative, criticizing this while giving generally mediocre reviews. Berk wrote that it is "not able to be categorized as good or bad" as it is "simply a crushing force, made up of precisely the ingredients you expect, churned together, and injudiciously dispensed", while Takiff said it felt "phoned-in". Bill Lamb of About.com was overtly positive – he gave the album a four-star rating, calling it "an enduring collection [of] solid holiday music" – as was Kirsten Coachman of the Seattle Post-Intelligencer, who said it is "an album filled with a great mix of classic and contemporary Christmas songs [that] goes above and beyond any possible expectations [she] had". American Songwriter included the album on its list of the best 2010 Christmas albums, though perceived it neutrally. Comparing Glee: The Music, The Christmas Album to the other selections on the list, it said that rather than creating a musical product from passion, the Glee cast release was done "in the spirit of [...] crass commercialism". The review said that the vocals and production were of a high quality, but deemed this to be expected and so unremarkable.

The opening track, Riley, Colfer, and Jenna Ushkowitz (Tina Cohen-Chang)'s "We Need a Little Christmas", was praised in The Detroit News, which described it as "underappreciated", and LA Music, which praised Riley's vocals and said the song "so wonderfully capture[s] the grandeur and spirit of Christmas." However, it was awarded two stars in Berk's Vanity Fair episode review, copying his response to "The Most Wonderful Day of the Year", which he said was "Blech." Rebecca Milzoff for Vulture was also unimpressed at the performance of "The Most Wonderful Day of the Year", saying the cast were singing "in a weirdly glazed over way", though she complimented Agron's vocals; (Note: Agron's vocals do not appear on the album version of the track.) Robert Canning of IGN instead thought it was "slightly peppier" than the original, which he praised. Emily St. James for The A.V. Club disliked the song, and wrote that it "sounds like something you might hear in a Walgreens." LA Music instead enjoyed it, praising Overstreet's voice, with Jen Harper of BuddyTV and The Atlantic's Fallon thinking it a fitting choice despite its cheesiness, as the glee club of the show are also a group of misfits.

Leahey enjoyed "Baby, It's Cold Outside", performed by Colfer and Criss, and said the choice to have it as a same-sex duet was "a refreshingly risqué move for Fox TV". Coachman noted that the characters' popularity gave the song buzz before it was released, adding that the duet's styling was sweet and the vocals "superb". Stransky said that it was the highlight of the album, and E! Online's Jennifer Arrow enjoyed the romantic context of the song in the episode while adding that "separate from the mushy stuff, it's a marvelous version of the song." Berk gave the rendition five stars, and Erica Futterman of Rolling Stone praised its harmonies.

There was also praise for the performance of "God Rest Ye Merry Gentlemen", led by Naya Rivera (Santana Lopez), and the vocals of the female singers (Michele, Riley, Ushkowitz, Agron, and Rivera) who performed it: Coachman was impressed with the quality of the harmonies, adding that the song takes on vulnerability because of how the singers "seem to be reining in the glory notes a bit", and Allan Stackhouse of LA Music felt it was one of the best songs on the album, complimenting each singer's contributions to the song's progression and the "lovely textures" of Ushkowitz and Agron's harmonies. St. James was disappointed that the song was not featured in the episode, but acknowledged that it would have been hard for Glee to incorporate religion well. Reviewing covers of the song in 2015, Emma Green of The Atlantic wrote that the Glee version has an "elf-like sweetness", though she felt that this did not convey the dramatic stakes of the lyrics, which describe humanity falling under Satan's power, and instead reminded her of "early-aughts middle-school dances."

Stransky and Coachman also made specific mention of Riley's "Angels We Have Heard on High", with Coachman saying she "has a voice to be reckoned with [but] the arrangement ... left something to be desired"; Arrow opined that the vocals on this and Michele's "O Holy Night" were "amazing, duh". Leahey also complimented the latter song, saying that "Michele belts out the high notes like the second coming of Kristin Chenoweth". Bruce Ward, writing for the Ottawa Citizen, however, did not like the track, and thought the song was uncomfortably downtempo.

Michele's other songs were poorly received. "Merry Christmas, Darling" was given one star by Berk – with this only as a tribute to original singer Karen Carpenter's young death – and Milzoff called it forced and "mournful". Berk gave two stars to her cover of "Last Christmas" (one added, again, because of the original artist appealing to him), asking why her character Rachel had so many songs. Canning was also displeased with their inclusion; he noted that, in the episode, Finn refused Rachel's "Merry Christmas, Darling" serenade gift but the song was still recorded, and opined that "Last Christmas" is "a terrible song in any season." Futterman felt that Michele's vocals on "Last Christmas" were "a bit diva-esque for the simple pop tune"; she was more impressed with the "restrained take" on "Merry Christmas, Darling". Brian Moylan of Gawker wrote that he likes the song and was glad to hear it covered, but noted that "she just didn't do Karen [Carpenter] justice". Also criticized was the stylistic choice of the reinvented group number "Deck the Rooftop", with Leahey questioning the arrangement of what he dubbed an "urban mash-up", though the song saw praise from Lamb; Ward felt it was "irresistible"; and Stackhouse enjoyed the "uncanny Glee feel" of the mix.

Kyle Buchanan of New York lamented the fact that Lynch was not the one singing "You're a Mean One, Mr. Grinch", calling it a "missed opportunity", while Coachman praised the version, saying "Morrison and Lang really capture [the song's] spirit", and Vince Horiuchi of The Salt Lake Tribune wrote that the "whimsical rendition" was the highlight of the "passable" album. Berk, instead, said the cover "[proved] that even Glee can get too arch", and awarded it two out of five stars.

== Chart performance ==
The week of November 24, 2010, the album debuted at number eight on the Billboard 200, with 161,198 copies sold; Glee's "O Holy Night" debuted at number one on the Holiday Digital Songs chart; and the album saw a debut at number three on the Canadian Albums Chart, selling 16,000 copies. The following week, the album dropped two spots in the US, with sales of 108,000, but held the same spot in Canada with an uptick of 18,000 copies sold. On December 4, 2010, the album debuted at number one of the Billboard Soundtrack Albums chart, spending six weeks in the top spot and fifty weeks on the chart, and landed on the Top Holiday Albums chart for the first week before peaking at number two on Christmas Day 2010. On December 15, 2010, the album climbed to number one on the Canadian Albums Chart, with sales totalling 81,000; it also reached its highest point on the US charts at number three, selling 193,000 copies that week. On December 18, 2010, it landed on the Tastemaker Albums chart, peaking at number eighteen in its second of three weeks. The album was certified platinum in April 2011, with over one million in sales, Glee's second-best selling album behind their first album release, Glee: The Music, Volume 1. Glee: The Music, The Christmas Album peaked in both Australia and Ireland at number thirteen, in New Zealand at number thirty-two, and in the Netherlands at number fifty; it debuted on the UK Albums Chart at number thirty-seven the week of December 11, 2010. As of August 2013, Glee: The Music, The Christmas Album has sold 1,080,000 copies in the US.

On the Billboard Hot 100, "Baby, It's Cold Outside" peaked at number fifty-seven and the non-album episode single "Welcome Christmas" peaked at number fifty-nine. "Baby, It's Cold Outside" and "Welcome Christmas" also charted on the Canadian Hot 100, peaking at number fifty-three and number thirty-seven, respectively, and other album songs "Jingle Bells" and "Deck The Rooftop" joined them with peaks at seventy-four and eighty-six (respectively) on the same chart.

Several songs from the album impacted other Billboard song charts. "We Need a Little Christmas" debuted on Billboard's Adult Contemporary chart the week of December 6, 2010, at number twenty, spending four weeks on the chart and peaking at fifteen. On Christmas Day 2010, "Deck the Rooftop" debuted on the Adult Contemporary chart at number twenty-nine, spending three weeks on the chart with a peak of twenty-two; and on New Year's Day 2011, "The Most Wonderful Day of the Year" entered the same chart at number twenty-eight, staying there one week. Six songs landed on the Canada AC (Adult Contemporary) chart: "We Need a Little Christmas", "Deck The Rooftop" and "Jingle Bells" all debuted on December 18, 2010, and all peaked on New Year's Day 2011, at numbers fifteen, two, and eight, respectively; "The Most Wonderful Day of the Year" and "Baby, It's Cold Outside" entered this chart on New Year's Day 2011, reaching their peaks at forty-three and thirty-three that same week; all six songs spent one more week in the charts after their peaks.

"O Holy Night" peaked at position 21 on the Bubbling Under Hot 100 chart on December 4, 2010, and "Last Christmas" debuted at number eight on the Hot 100 Recurrents chart on Christmas Day 2010. (Note: Only post-album chart placements for "Last Christmas" are included; as a charity single it impacted different charts in 2009.) The Holiday Digital Songs chart saw five songs from the album (and "Welcome Christmas") place: "Baby, It's Cold Outside" spent twenty-five weeks on the chart and peaked at number one; "O Holy Night" was on the list for thirteen weeks after debuting at number one; "Last Christmas" peaked at number three, with twenty-five weeks spent on the chart; "Deck The Rooftop" spent four weeks on the chart and peaked at eleven; "We Need a Little Christmas" peaked at sixteen on its first of three weeks on the list; and "Welcome Christmas" debuted at number four on Christmas Day 2010 on its first of five weeks on the chart.

== Track listing ==
No.	Title	Writer(s)	Original (and/or earliest recording) artist	Length
1.	"We Need a Little Christmas"	Jerry Herman	Angela Lansbury in the musical Mame	2:45
2.	"Deck the Rooftop"	traditional/Benjamin Hanby	See Notes	2:32
3.	"Merry Christmas Darling"	Frank Pooler and Richard Carpenter	The Carpenters	3:04
4.	"Baby, It's Cold Outside"	Frank Loesser	Frank Loesser and Lynn Garland	2:48
5.	"The Most Wonderful Day of the Year"	Johnny Marks	Videocraft Chorus for the animated television special Rudolph the Red-Nosed Reindeer	2:02
6.	"Last Christmas"	George Michael	Wham!	3:37
7.	"God Rest Ye Merry Gentlemen"	traditional	Victor Mixed Chorus & Trinity Choir with Victor Orchestra	3:11
8.	"O Christmas Tree"	traditional	Nebe Quartett	3:02
9.	"Jingle Bells"	James Pierpont	Edison Male Quartette	2:56
10.	"You're a Mean One, Mr. Grinch" (featuring k.d. lang)	Albert Hague and Ted Geisel	Thurl Ravenscroft for the animated television special How the Grinch Stole Christmas!	3:20
11.	"Angels We Have Heard on High"	traditional	Paul Mickelson Orchestra & Choir	4:24
12.	"O Holy Night"	traditional	Reginald Fessenden	5:01

Notes

- "Deck the Rooftop" is a mashup of "Deck the Halls" and "Up on the Housetop".
- "Deck the Halls": Earliest sound recording performed by Voco Orchestra.
- "Up on the Housetop": Earliest sound recording performed by Bill Boyd and His Cowboy Ramblers.

== Personnel ==
Unless otherwise indicated, information is adapted from the original CD liner notes.

- Dianna Agron – lead vocals (track 7) (Note: In the liner notes, Agron is not credited for the track, only as part of the Glee Cast Vocals.)
- Adam Anders – arranger, digital editing, engineer, producer, soundtrack producer, vocal arrangement, additional background vocals
- Alex Anders – digital editing, engineer
- Nikki Anders – additional background vocals
- Peer Åström – arranger, engineer, mixing, producer
- Kala Balch – additional background vocals
- Dave Bett – art direction
- PJ Bloom – music supervisor
- RaVaughn Brown – additional background vocals
- Geoff Bywater – executive in charge of music
- Deyder Cintron – assistant engineer, digital editing
- Chris Colfer – lead vocals (tracks 1, 4–5)
- Kamari Copeland – additional background vocals
- Darren Criss – lead vocals (track 4) (Note: In the liner notes, Criss is credited for the track, but not as part of the Glee Cast Vocals nor as a guest vocalist.)
- Tim Davis – vocal arrangement, vocal contractor, additional background vocals
- Dante Di Loreto – soundtrack executive producer
- Brad Falchuk – soundtrack executive producer
- Heather Guibert – coordination
- Missi Hale – additional background vocals
- Jon Hall – additional background vocals
- Nikki Hassman – arranger
- Jerry Herman – composer
- Tobias Kampe-Flygare – assistant engineer
- k.d. lang – lead vocals, guest vocals (track 10)
- Storm Lee – additional background vocals
- Frank Loesser – composer
- David Loucks – additional background vocals
- Jane Lynch – vocals (Credit only)
- Meaghan Lyons – coordination
- Dominick Maita – mastering
- Johnny Marks – composer
- Maria Paula Marulanda – art direction
- Jayma Mays – vocals (Credit only)
- Kevin McHale – lead vocals (tracks 2, 5, 9)
- George Michael – composer
- Lea Michele – lead vocals (tracks 2–3, 6–7, 12)
- Cory Monteith – lead vocals (tracks 2, 6, 9)
- Heather Morris – lead vocals (tracks 2, 5)
- Matthew Morrison – lead vocals (tracks 8, 10)
- Ryan Murphy – producer, soundtrack producer
- Chord Overstreet – lead vocals (track 5) (Note: In the liner notes, Overstreet is credited for the track, but not as part of the Glee Cast Vocals nor as a guest vocalist.)
- Martin Persson – arranger, orchestration, programming
- Stefan Persson – horn arrangements
- Nicole Ray – production coordination
- Amber Riley – lead vocals (tracks 1–2, 6–7, 11)
- Naya Rivera – lead vocals (tracks 2, 7)
- Mark Salling – lead vocals (track 9)
- Onitsha Shaw – additional background vocals
- Jenny Sinclair – coordination
- Kerstin Thörn – string arrangements
- Jenna Ushkowitz – lead vocals (tracks 1–2, 5, 7)
- Windy Wagner – additional background vocals

== Charts and certifications ==
=== Weekly charts ===
Chart (2010)	Peak position
Australian Albums (ARIA)	13
Canadian Albums (Billboard)	1
Dutch Albums (Album Top 100)	43
Irish Albums (IRMA)	13
New Zealand Albums (RMNZ)	32
Scottish Albums (Official Charts)	33
UK Albums (Official Charts)	37
US Billboard 200	3
US Top Holiday Albums (Billboard)	2
US Soundtrack Albums (Billboard)	1

Chart (2025)	Peak position
Portuguese Streaming Albums (AFP)	132

=== Year-end charts ===
Chart (2010)	Position
Australian Albums (ARIA)	64

Chart (2011)	Position
Canadian Albums (Billboard)	12
US Billboard 200	20
US Soundtrack Albums (Billboard)	1

=== Certifications ===
Country	Certification
Australia	Gold
Ireland	Gold
United Kingdom	Silver
United States	Platinum

== Release history ==
Country	Release date	Format(s)
Germany	November 9, 2010	CD
Australia	November 16, 2010	Digital download
Canada	November 16, 2010	Digital download
Mexico	November 16, 2010	Digital download
Ireland	November 16, 2010	Digital download
Netherlands	November 16, 2010	Digital download
Switzerland	November 16, 2010	Digital download
United States	November 16, 2010	CD, digital download
Australia	November 19, 2010	CD
Ireland	November 19, 2010	Digital download
Taiwan	November 19, 2010	CD
Denmark	November 22, 2010	Digital download
Finland	November 22, 2010	Digital download
New Zealand	November 22, 2010	Digital download
Norway	November 22, 2010	Digital download
Portugal	November 22, 2010	Digital download
Spain	November 23, 2010	Digital download
United Kingdom	November 29, 2010	CD, digital download
Poland	December 6, 2010	CD
