= Christmas Album =

A Christmas album is an album of Christmas music.

Christmas Album may refer to:

- Christmas Album (Boney M. album), 1981
- Christmas Album (Herb Alpert album), 1968
- Christmas Album, an album by Burl Ives, 1968
- Christmas Album, an album by Canned Heat, 2007
- A Christmas Album (Amy Grant album), 1983
- A Christmas Album (Barbra Streisand album), 1967
- A Christmas Album (Bright Eyes album), 2002
- A Christmas Album (James Taylor album), 2004
- The Christmas Album (Air Supply album), 1987
- The Christmas Album, by Chris Rea, 2025
- The Christmas Album (Leslie Odom Jr. album), 2020
- The Christmas Album (Lynn Anderson album), 1971
- The Christmas Album (Neil Diamond album), 1992
- The Christmas Album (Roberta Flack album), 1997
- The Christmas Album (Human Nature album), 2013
- The Christmas Album, by Aled Jones, 2004
- The Christmas Album (Lee Kernaghan album), 1998
- The Christmas Album (Nitty Gritty Dirt Band album), 1997
- The Christmas Album (The Manhattan Transfer album), 1992
- The Christmas Album (Johnny Mathis album), 2002
- The Christmas Album (Richard & Adam album), 2013
- The Christmas Album (Lea Salonga album), 2001
- The Christmas Album (Stiff Little Fingers album), 1979
- Glee: The Music, The Christmas Album, an album by the cast of the TV series Glee, 2010
- Christmas Album (Jackson 5 album), 1970
- The Jethro Tull Christmas Album, 2003

== See also ==
- Christmas music
- A Christmas Record, a 1981 compilation LP by ZE Records
- ZE Xmas Record, a 2004 CD version of the 1981 LP A Christmas Record
- The Xmas EP, a 2013 record by Never Shout Never
