= Glee: The Music, Volume 4 =

Soundtrack album by Glee Cast
- Released: November 26, 2010
- Recorded: 2010
- Genres: Pop, rock, hip hop
- Length: 65:22
- Label: Columbia / 20th Century Fox TV
- Producers: Dante Di Loreto (exec.), Brad Falchuk (exec.), Adam Anders, Peer Åström, Tommy Faragher, Ryan Murphy

Glee Cast chronology
| Glee: The Music, The Christmas Album (2010) | Glee: The Music, Volume 4 (2010) | Glee: The Music, Volume 5 (2011) |

Glee: The Music, Volume 4 is the fifth soundtrack album by the cast of the musical television series Glee, which airs on Fox in the United States. It was released on November 26, 2010, by Columbia Records and features cover version performances from the first half of the second season. Executive production was handled by Dante Di Loreto and Brad Falchuk and all tracks were released as singles. It was nominated for a Grammy Award (2011) in the Best Compilation Soundtrack for Visual Media category.

== Background ==
The album's tracks constitute performances from eight of the first nine episodes of the season; the fifth, "The Rocky Horror Glee Show", received its own extended play in October 2010, Glee: The Music, The Rocky Horror Glee Show. The track listing for Glee: The Music, Volume 4 was revealed on November 3, 2010, followed by the official press release on November 9, 2010. The album was preceded by Glee: The Music, The Christmas Album on November 16, 2010, which accompanies a later Christmas episode. Actress Gwyneth Paltrow guest-starred on an episode performing "Forget You", the censored version of Cee Lo Green's 2010 single "Fuck You", which appears on the album.

== Reception ==
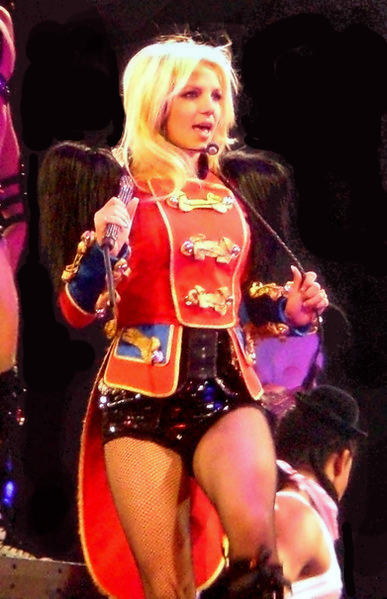
Britney Spears (pictured) was one of many artists covered who praised Glee renditions.

Professional ratings
Review scores
| Source | Rating |
|---|---|
| AllMusic | 3/5 stars |
| Entertainment Weekly | (A−) |

The series' cover versions received mixed reviews throughout the season. MTV News felt "Empire State of Mind" lacked gravitas and The Washington Post thought it was "maybe-trying-too-hard". The latter, however, also deemed "Billionaire" the best performance of the episode. Kevin McHale's version of Britney Spears' "Stronger" and Lea Michele's version of Paramore's "The Only Exception" were praised by critics, with Entertainment Weekly complimenting the soulful cover of the former and Rolling Stone calling the latter "gorgeous and tender". On "Me Against the Music", Naya Rivera's vocals were met positively while Heather Morris was described as "not a standout vocalist". The interpretation of "I Want to Hold Your Hand" received mixed criticism, from the Daily News receiving Chris Colfer's vocal performance and the context of its lyrics negatively to The A.V. Club calling it "one of his best performances on the show". Both The Wall Street Journal and Zap2it praised the vocals on the duets "River Deep, Mountain High" and "Lucky". The vocal arrangement of "Marry You" was well-enjoyed by Rolling Stone, but the next track "Sway" was deemed inferior to the Michael Bublé cover.

Alicia Keys and Travie McCoy were two of many artists covered who approved of their respective songs; the former called "Empire State of Mind" "amazing". The social networking site Twitter was frequently used for this—Spears was impressed with the covers of "Stronger" and "Toxic" and Paramore's Hayley Williams complimented Michele's vocals on "The Only Exception". Additionally, Katy Perry used the site to praise the a cappella rendition of "Teenage Dream", which features guest star Darren Criss as lead vocalist. Speaking to MTV News, Green expressed flattery that Paltrow was covering his song.

== Chart performance ==
Glee: The Music, Volume 4 debuted at number five on the Billboard 200 and number two on the Billboard Soundtracks chart with sales 128,000 in the US. It debuted the same week on the Canadian Albums Chart at number six. On the Australian Singles Chart, the album made its debut on December 6, 2010, at number three and has been certified gold for 35,000 units. In New Zealand, Volume 4 debuted at number ten.

== Singles ==
All tracks have been released as singles, available for digital download throughout the season's airings from September through November 2010. All singles except "Sway" have charted on both the Billboard Hot 100 and the Canadian Hot 100; the highest-charting of these was the cover of "Teenage Dream" at number eight and ten, respectively. The single sold 55,000 copies in its first day, and went on to beat the first-week sales record of 177,000 previously held by debut single "Don't Stop Believin'", with 214,000 in the US. In Canada, 13,000 copies were sold. The chart performance of "Teenage Dream" surpassed that of "Toxic", which peaked at number sixteen in the US and fifteen in Canada. It sold 109,000 copies in the US and, at the time, was the cast's second-highest-charting entry on the Billboard Hot 100, tied with "Total Eclipse of the Heart". In other countries, the best-performing singles were "Billionaire" at number fifteen in Ireland, and "Empire State of Mind" at number twenty in Australia. "Empire State of Mind" marked the highest first-day sales of any Glee song at the time with 106,000 downloads in the US over the week following its release.

The record for most appearances by a group on the Billboard Hot 100, previously set by The Beatles, was broken when six songs debuted on the chart the week of October 16, 2010. This feat also placed the cast third overall among all artists, behind James Brown and Elvis Presley. Four songs debuted on November 18, 2010, which pushed the number of appearances to ninety-three, surpassing Brown's accomplishment to land at second.

== Track listing ==
Information is based on the album's Liner notes

| No. | Title | Writer(s) | Version covered | Length |
|---|---|---|---|---|
| 1. | "Empire State of Mind" | Shawn Carter, Angela Hunte, Alicia Augello-Cook, Sylvia Robinson, Alexander Shuckburgh, Burt Keyes, Janet Sewell | Jay-Z featuring Alicia Keys | 4:39 |
| 2. | "Billionaire" | Travie McCoy, Peter Hernandez, Philip Lawrence, Ari Levine | Travie McCoy featuring Bruno Mars | 3:32 |
| 3. | "Me Against the Music" | Britney Spears, Madonna Ciccone, Christopher Stewart, Terius Nash, Thabiso Nkhereanye, Penelope Magnet, Gary O'Brien | Britney Spears featuring Madonna | 3:46 |
| 4. | "Stronger" | Martin Sandberg, Rami Yacoub | Britney Spears | 3:25 |
| 5. | "Toxic" | Henrik Jonback, Christian Karlsson, Pontus Winnberg, Cathy Dennis | Britney Spears | 3:26 |
| 6. | "The Only Exception" | Hayley Williams, Josh Farro | Paramore | 4:28 |
| 7. | "I Want to Hold Your Hand" | Lennon–McCartney | T.V. Carpio in the musical film Across the Universe | 2:38 |
| 8. | "One of Us" | Eric Bazilian | Joan Osborne | 4:02 |
| 9. | "River Deep - Mountain High" | Ellie Greenwich, Jeff Barry, Phil Spector | Ike & Tina Turner | 3:34 |
| 10. | "Lucky" | Jason Mraz, Colbie Caillat, Timothy Fagan | Jason Mraz and Colbie Caillat | 3:09 |
| 11. | "One Love (People Get Ready)" | Bob Marley, Curtis Mayfield | Bob Marley & The Wailers | 2:36 |
| 12. | "Teenage Dream" | Lukasz Gottwald, Katy Perry, Max Martin, Benjamin Levin, Bonnie McKee | Katy Perry | 3:41 |
| 13. | "Forget You" (featuring Gwyneth Paltrow) | Phillip Lawrence, Ari Levine, Brody Brown, Bruno Mars, Thomas Callaway | Cee Lo Green | 3:42 |
| 14. | "Marry You" | Ari Levine, Bruno Mars, Philip Lawrence | Bruno Mars | 3:46 |
| 15. | "Sway" | Pablo Beltrán Ruiz, Luis Demetrio T. Molina, Norman Gimbel | Pablo Beltrán Ruiz as "Quién será" (Spanish); Dean Martin (English) | 3:09 |
| 16. | "Just the Way You Are" | Philip Lawrence, Ari Levine, Bruno Mars, Khari Cain, Saint Cassius | Bruno Mars | 3:37 |
| 17. | "Valerie" | Dave McCabe, Sean Payne, Abi Harding, Boyan Chowdhury, Russell Pritchard | Mark Ronson featuring Amy Winehouse | 3:35 |
| 18. | "(I've Had) The Time of My Life" | Franke Previte, John DeNicola, Donald Markowitz | Bill Medley and Jennifer Warnes | 5:09 |

Japanese bonus tracks
| No. | Title | Writer(s) | Original artist(s) | Length |
|---|---|---|---|---|
| 19. | "Dog Days Are Over" | Florence Welch, Isabella Summers | Florence + the Machine | 4:13 |
| 20. | "Telephone" | Stefani Germanotta, Rodney "Darkchild" Jerkins, LaShawn Daniels, Lazonate Franklin, Beyoncé Knowles | Lady Gaga and Beyoncé | 3:43 |

== Personnel ==
Information is taken from Liner notes

- Dianna Agron - lead vocals (8, 10, 14, 18)
- Adam Anders - record producer, recording engineer, music & vocal arranger, additional background vocals (1–11, 13–18)
- Alex Anders - recording engineer (1–11, 13–18)
- Nikki Anders - additional background vocals (1–11, 13–18)
- Peer Astrom - music arranger, record producer, recording engineer, audio mixing (1–11, 13–18)
- Kala Balch – additional background vocals (1–11, 13–18)
- Colin Benward – additional background vocals (1–11, 13–18)
- Dave Bett – art direction
- PJ Bloom – music supervisor
- Ed Boyer – music arranger, vocal arranger, additional recording engineer (12)
- Ravaughn Brown – additional background vocals (1–11, 13–18)
- Geoff Bywater – executive in charge of music
- Sam Cantor – background vocals (12)
- Josh Cheuse – art direction
- Deyder Cintron – assistant recording engineer, digital editing (1–11, 13–18)
- Chris Colfer – lead vocals (7–8)
- Kamari Copeland – additional background vocals (1–11, 13–18)
- Darren Criss – lead vocals (12)
- Tim Davis – additional vocal arrangement, vocal contractor, additional background vocals (1–11, 13–18)
- Dante Di Loreto – soundtrack executive producer
- Brad Falchuk – soundtrack executive producer
- Tommy Faragher – record producer (12)
- Conor Flynn – background vocals (12)
- Michael Grant – background vocals (12)
- Heather Guibert – coordination
- Missi Hale – additional background vocals (1–11, 13–18)
- Jon Hall – additional background vocals (1–11, 13–18)
- Samantha Jade – additional background vocals (1–11, 13–18)
- Tobias Kampe-Flygare – assistant recording engineer (1–11, 13–18)
- Charlie Kramsky – assistant recording engineer (12)
- John Kwon – background vocals (12)
- Storm Lee – additional background vocals (1–11, 13–18)
- David Loucks – additional background vocals (1–11, 13–18)
- Meaghan Lyons – coordination
- Cailin Mackenzie – background vocals (12)
- Dominick Maita – mastering
- Kent McCann – background vocals (12)
- Kevin McHale – lead vocals (1–2, 4, 11, 13–14)
- Lea Michele – lead vocals (5–6, 8, 14)
- Cory Monteith – lead vocals (1–2, 4, 8, 14, 16)
- Heather Morris – lead vocals (3, 5, 14)
- Matthew Morrison – lead vocals (5, 15)
- Eric Morrissey – background vocals (12)
- Ryan Murphy – record producer (1–11, 13–18), soundtrack producer
- Jeanette Olsson – additional background vocals (1–11, 13–18)
- Chord Overstreet – lead vocals (2, 10, 14, 18)
- Gwyneth Paltrow - lead vocals (13)
- Martin Persson – additional music arranger, orchestration, music programming (1–11, 13–18)
- Stefan Persson – additional horn arranger (1–11, 13–18)
- Zac Poor – additional background vocals (1–11, 13–18)
- Evan Powell – background vocals (12)
- Nicole Ray – production coordination
- Amber Riley – lead vocals (1, 8–9, 13)
- Naya Rivera – lead vocals (1, 3, 9, 17)
- Penn Rosen – background vocals (12)
- Mark Salling – lead vocals (1–2, 4, 11)
- Drew Ryan Scott – additional background vocals (1–11, 13–18)
- Eli Seidman – background vocals (12)
- Onitsha Shaw – additional background vocals (1–11, 13–18)
- Harry Shum Jr. - lead vocals (14)
- Jenny Sinclair – coordination
- Bryan Smith – recording engineer, audio mixing (12)
- Robert Smith – recording engineer (12)
- Sally Stevens – additional music arranger, additional vocal arranger, vocal contractor (12)
- Jack Thomas – background vocals (12)
- Kerstin Thörn – additional string arranger (1–11, 13–18)
- Jenna Ushkowitz – lead vocals (8, 14)
- Windy Wagner – additional background vocals (1–11, 13–18)

== Charts ==
=== Weekly charts ===
List of 2010 peak positions by chart
| Chart (2010) | Peak position |
|---|---|
| Australian Albums (ARIA) | 3 |
| Canadian Albums (Billboard) | 6 |
| Irish Albums (IRMA) | 12 |
| US Billboard 200 | 5 |

List of 2011 peak positions by chart
| Chart (2011) | Peak position |
|---|---|
| Belgian Albums (Ultratop Flanders) | 61 |
| Belgian Albums (Ultratop Wallonia) | 91 |
| Dutch Albums (Album Top 100) | 24 |
| Mexican Albums (Top 100 Mexico) | 8 |
| New Zealand Albums (RMNZ) | 7 |
| Portuguese Albums (AFP) | 26 |
| Spanish Albums (Promusicae) | 86 |
| Scottish Albums (Official Charts) | 4 |
| Swiss Albums (Schweizer Hitparade) | 97 |
| UK Albums (Official Charts) | 4 |
| US Soundtrack Albums (Billboard) | 1 |

List of 2012 peak positions by chart
| Chart (2012) | Peak position |
|---|---|
| French Albums (SNEP) | 126 |

=== Year-end charts ===
| Chart (2010) | Position |
|---|---|
| Australian Albums (ARIA) | 21 |
| New Zealand Albums (RMNZ) | 37 |

| Chart (2011) | Position |
|---|---|
| Australian Albums (ARIA) | 59 |
| Canadian Albums (Billboard) | 25 |
| Mexican Albums (AMPROFON) | 86 |
| New Zealand Albums (RMNZ) | 47 |
| UK Albums (OCC) | 94 |
| US Billboard 200 | 40 |
| US Soundtrack Albums (Billboard) | 2 |

=== Certifications ===
| Region | Certification | Certified units/sales |
|---|---|---|
| Australia (ARIA) | Platinum | 70,000^{^} |
| Ireland (IRMA) | Gold | 7,500^{^} |
| New Zealand (RMNZ) | Gold | 7,500^{^} |
| United Kingdom (BPI) | Gold | 100,000^{^} |
| United States (RIAA) | Gold | 500,000^{^} |
^{^} Shipments figures based on certification alone.

== Release history ==
List of release dates, showing country and formats released
| Country | Release date | Format(s) |
|---|---|---|
| Australia | November 26, 2010 | CD, digital download |
| Canada | November 30, 2010 | CD, digital download |
| Germany | November 30, 2010 | CD |
| United States | November 30, 2010 | CD, digital download |
| United Kingdom | February 21, 2011 | Digital download |
| Taiwan | March 29, 2011 | CD |
| Italy | October 11, 2011 | CD, digital download |
