= Puck (Glee) =

Fictional character from the Fox series Glee

Noah "Puck" Puckerman
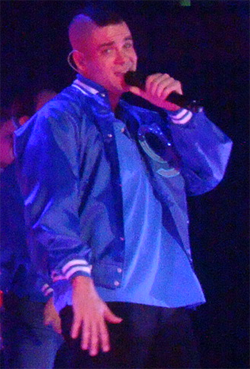
- Mark Salling as Puck on the Glee Live! In Concert! tour
- First appearance: "Pilot" (2009)
- Last appearance: "Dreams Come True" (2015)
- Created by: Ryan Murphy; Brad Falchuk; Ian Brennan
- Portrayed by: Mark Salling

In-universe information
- Occupation: U.S. Air Force Airman
- Family: Mr Puckerman (father); Mrs Puckerman (mother); Jake Puckerman (paternal half brother); Connie (grandmother); Unnamed younger sister
- Significant others: Quinn Fabray (girlfriend); Rachel Berry (ex-girlfriend); Lauren Zizes (ex-girlfriend); Santana Lopez (ex-girlfriend); Kitty Wilde (ex-girlfriend)
- Children: Beth (daughter; given up at birth)
- Religion: Judaism

Noah "Puck" Puckerman is a fictional character from the Fox musical comedy-drama series Glee. The character was portrayed by Mark Salling, and appeared in Glee from its pilot episode, first broadcast on May 19, 2009, to the series finale, broadcast on March 20, 2015. Puck was developed by Glee creators Ryan Murphy, Brad Falchuk and Ian Brennan. He is Finn Hudson's best friend and football teammate, who initially disapproves of Finn joining the New Directions glee club at the fictional William McKinley High School in Lima, Ohio, where the show is set, but he eventually joins it himself. In 2010, Salling was nominated for the Teen Choice Award for Choice TV: Breakout Star Male for his work as Puck, and in 2011 for the Choice TV: Scene Stealer Male category.

== Development ==
=== Casting and creation ===
Puck was played by Mark Salling. He was also portrayed as a preschooler by Matthew Lepper in the episode "The Substitute". Salling had sent 100 packets to agents and managers, and "one called me and submitted me for Glee that day in her office." He had five auditions for Glee before being cast as Puck.

=== Characterization ===
Salling found it challenging to make the character "more than two-dimensional so he can be likable at the same time", which necessitated "find[ing] the balance between arrogance and cocky and sensible and likable". He recalled that "in the breakdown for the show, when they were describing his character in the very beginning, it's like Puck: a man-child." Salling explained that Puck has "stars in his eyes, he's hoping to get out of this small town." Salling gained 20 pounds (9.1 kg) before filming the pilot episode in order to better embody his football playing character. He then lost 30 pounds (14 kg) for a scene in the third episode that required him to be toned, which he described as "an extreme experience".

=== Relationships ===
Puck's main basis for relationships at the beginning is sexual rather than romantic. He has sexual encounters with his female pool-cleaning clients and fellow students, including a recurrent relationship with cheerleader Santana Lopez (Naya Rivera) that seems to be casual, though Santana confronts both Mercedes Jones (Amber Riley) and Lauren Zizes (Ashley Fink) when Puck starts pursuing them in the first and second seasons respectively. Puck also claimed to have slept with Brittany Pierce (Heather Morris). He falls in love with Quinn Fabray (Dianna Agron) after he takes her virginity and impregnates her despite the fact that she's dating his best friend Finn Hudson (Cory Monteith) at the time, but he can't give up flirting with and seducing others even when Quinn contemplates raising the baby-to-be with him as he wants rather than giving it up for adoption, since she refuses to have sex with him again. The brief pairing of Puck with Rachel Berry (Lea Michele) in the episode "Mash-Up", spurred by his mother urging him to find a Jewish girlfriend, dissolves because he wants Quinn and she wants Finn. Series creator Ryan Murphy was surprised by the positive fan response to their pairing, which he described as "strange and bizarre", explaining that he had believed fans would prefer Rachel to be with Finn. As a result of the response, Murphy planned to revisit their romance later in the season, though nothing much came of it.

In the second season, Puck recruits Lauren to join the glee club when the club needs a twelfth member in order to participate in the Sectionals competition. Within a couple of months, he has fallen in love with her, but she doesn't succumb to his blandishments, and he's forced to woo her over a long period of time, starting as friends. He supports her in her first solo for glee club and runs her campaign for prom queen. They are still a couple at the end of the school year. In the fourth episode of the third season, Puck and the adoptive mother of his child Shelby Corcoran kiss. He ends the series dating Quinn.

== Storylines ==
=== Season 1 ===
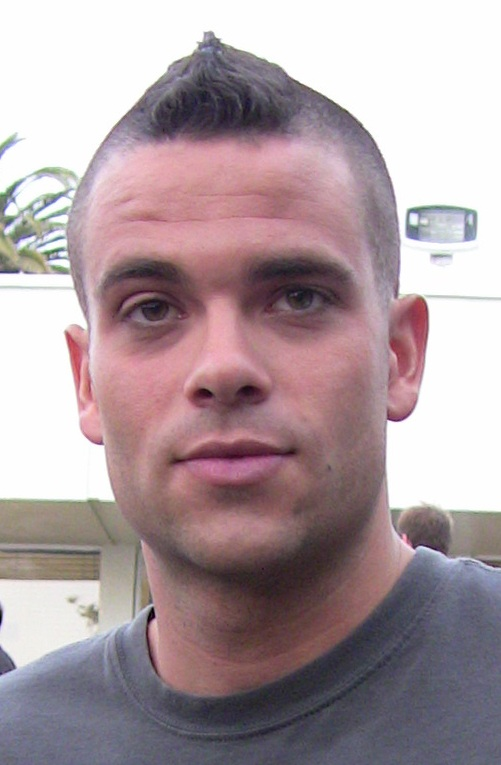
Mark Salling played Puck

Puck is introduced as a football player and bully at William McKinley High School; he is frequently seen throwing fellow students into dumpsters, or tossing slushies in their faces. It is later revealed that he is Jewish. He is the best friend of Finn, the quarterback, and has a summer pool-cleaning business that leads to sexual encounters with his adult female clients. Despite that, he has sex with fellow students, including in an on-again, off-again relationship with Santana Lopez, a cheerleader, which does not completely end forever until the middle of the second season. Puck initially acts homophobic and mocks Finn for joining the school glee club, New Directions, but later becomes a part of glee club director Will Schuester's (Matthew Morrison) all-male a cappella group, the Acafellas, hoping to impress the mothers at a performance for the school's PTA meeting. He subsequently joins New Directions along with two other members of the football team. When Finn's girlfriend Quinn is impregnated and tells Finn the baby is his, Puck realizes that he is the actual father, and offers to support Quinn. She rejects his proposal, calling him a "Lima loser". Puck begins dating Rachel Berry (Lea Michele), the glee club lead vocalist, after his mother urges him to find a Jewish girlfriend; Rachel is initially resistant, but agrees after Puck sings "Sweet Caroline" for her in front of the glee club. However, Rachel later breaks up with him after a brief romance.

When the glee club holds a bake sale to pay for a wheelchair-accessible bus so Artie (Kevin McHale) can ride with the club to Sectionals competition, it only succeeds because Puck makes a special, popular cupcake recipe—he secretly adds pot, making the students come back for more. He offers financials to Quinn to show he will be a good father and provider; she figures out that it's the money from the bake sale, and refuses to accept it, though she expresses her gratitude and apologizes for her previous insult. Quinn reconsiders her plan to have the baby adopted and gives Puck a chance to prove himself by helping her to babysit Terri Schuester's (Jessalyn Gilsig) three nephews. Puck impresses her, but Quinn later learns to her dismay that he was sexting Santana. Puck claims he will be help her to parent their child, but he cannot remain in a committed relationship with Quinn if she refuses to have sex with him; Quinn returns to her original plan of giving the baby to Terri, who is faking a pregnancy to hold on to Will. Rachel begins to suspect that Puck is the father of Quinn's baby and tells Finn. Finn attacks Puck and confronts Quinn, who admits the truth. Puck again offers to be with Quinn, but she declines and tells him she wants to be alone, though she moves in with Puck's family since her parents had kicked her out and she can no longer stay at Finn's house.

In the episode "Laryngitis", when Puck's mohawk is shaved off by his doctor, he finds the other McKinley students no longer respect him as a badass. He romances fellow glee club member Mercedes, once a popular cheerleader, to restore his status. His plan is successful, but he and Mercedes ultimately have nothing in common, and split when she quits cheerleading and he returns to his bullying ways. In the first-season finale, "Journey to Regionals", Quinn goes into labour immediately after the club performs at the Regionals competition, and Puck is present at the birth of their daughter, who Puck names Beth. When Puck and Quinn visit Beth in the hospital nursery, Puck tells Quinn that he loves her. Beth is adopted by Rachel's birth mother Shelby Corcoran (Idina Menzel), the coach of Vocal Adrenaline, the show choir that defeated New Directions at Regionals.

=== Season 2 ===
In the season opener, "Audition", Puck is interviewed by blogger Jacob Ben Israel (Josh Sussman) and reveals that he had a vasectomy over the summer, saying it was the only responsible thing to do. Soon after the school year begins, Puck is arrested and sent to a juvenile detention center for driving his mother's car through a convenience store window and driving off with the ATM. He returns in "Never Been Kissed", but he is now on probation and helps Artie out in an attempt to satisfy his community service, although this is only initially because Puck claimed he was "helping a crip" and they misunderstood him. Though he acts tougher than ever to his classmates, Puck eventually confesses to Artie that he was terrified in juvie, and the two come to the agreement that Artie will tutor Puck, who has to pick up garbage to fulfill his community service requirements. In "Furt", Puck, Artie, Mike Chang (Harry Shum Jr.) and Sam Evans (Chord Overstreet) confront Dave Karofsky (Max Adler) in the boys locker room to get him to stop bullying Kurt Hummel (Chris Colfer). Because he was still on probation, Puck reluctantly had to watch the beat down between Sam and Karofsky, but despite not being allowed to fight and feeling helpless about it, he showed great restraint and was still praised for standing up for Kurt. "Special Education", Puck is asked by Will to find a new glee club member to replace Kurt, who has left McKinley and New Directions. He tries to recruit from the football team, but they lock him in a port-a-potty; he is rescued the next day by Lauren Zizes (Ashley Fink), who becomes the club's new twelfth member. Puck gets intimate with Rachel at her instigation, but leaves abruptly, realizing that he doesn't want to betray Finn for a second time, though Finn dumps Rachel when she confesses to him about it. Puck and Finn finally settle their differences in "The Sue Sylvester Shuffle", and they work together to help the football team win its first-ever championship.

In the episode "Silly Love Songs", Puck unexpectedly falls for Lauren, and performs the song "Fat Bottomed Girls" by Queen, which expresses his love of Lauren's bigger body type, but Lauren is offended by the song. Santana, unhappy with being deserted by Puck, slaps Lauren in front of him to warn her away, and Lauren tosses her around like she was nothing, leaving her dazed. Puck immediately begs Lauren to go out with him. She ultimately agrees to go on a pre-Valentine's date with him, but stands him up. Puck clumsily tells Lauren he likes her, not because of her looks but because of her "badass-ness"; Lauren says she is not looking for something casual. They go out on Valentine's Day "as friends", though Puck is clearly hoping for more in the future. In the episode "Sexy", Lauren tells Puck she's decided to make a sex tape to help her become famous, to his delight, but their plans are dashed when substitute sex education teacher Holly Holliday (Gwyneth Paltrow) informs them that as both are underage it would be considered child pornography. As part of a class assignment in the episode "Original Song", Puck writes and sings a song for Lauren—"Big Ass Heart"—that she likes. In "Born This Way", Puck discovers that Lauren had been a child beauty queen; he tells her he will run a campaign for her to become that year's prom queen, and be her king. After candidate Quinn insults Lauren's candidacy, Puck helps Lauren dig up dirt on Quinn, but the tactic backfires. Neither Puck nor Lauren win the race for prom queen and king, but they remain a couple; they fly with the rest of New Directions to the nationals competition in New York City, where the glee club comes in twelfth out of fifty teams.

=== Season 3 ===
Lauren breaks up with Puck at the beginning of school year and drops out of glee club, claiming that it is hurting her reputation. Shelby Corcoran, who adopted baby Beth, gets a teaching job at McKinley, and invites Puck and Quinn to be a part of Beth's life, provided they both become more responsible. Puck does so, and Shelby allows him to see Beth. Quinn decides she wants to regain custody of Beth, but Puck is torn, and tells Shelby of Quinn's plans. He spends increasing amounts of time with Beth, but then falls in love with Shelby. She sleeps with him once, though she tells him afterward she has made a mistake, to his disgust, and subsequently resigns from McKinley. One day his father visits him at work asking him for money for rent. This visit makes Puck fear that he might one day be like his father and visit Beth at work and ask her for money. He decides to be a father that Beth would be proud of and tries to do better in school and graduate with his class. After he fails his geography final and discovers that he is not graduating he decides to not care about grades and flunk out. In the episode "Props", he gets into a fight with Rick "The Stick" Nelson and pulls out a knife. Coach Beiste (Dot-Marie Jones) breaks up the fight and she informs Puck that he could get expelled from school for bringing the knife. He tells her that it's a prop knife that they used in their production of West Side Story and that he does not care since he is flunking out anyway. They have a heart to heart and the next day, she tells him that what he told her in their heart to heart the day before and it gave her the strength to leave her abusive husband. She told him that she owes him big time and that she talked to his geography teacher and she agreed to let Puck retake the test. In the season finale, Puck studies with Quinn's help and then retakes his final exam. He passes with a C− and graduates from McKinley.

=== Season 4 ===
In the Season 4 premiere, it is revealed that Puck has a paternal half-brother named Jake (Jacob Artist) who he was not aware of, though the two are introduced to each other by Will in the following episode, "Britney 2.0", while Puck is briefly visiting Lima from his new home, Los Angeles. Jake later turns to Puck for advice over the phone on how to get Marley Rose (Melissa Benoist) to date him, and Puck subsequently invites Jake to visit him in California over the Christmas holiday; the two get matching tattoos. Puck decides to return to Lima to live, and the two Puckermans arrange for their mothers to meet on Christmas Day where the two families bond. Puck later starts dating Kitty (Becca Tobin) in order to keep her away from Jake and spoiling his budding relationship with Marley, though Puck and she break up when he moves into Finn's dorm room at the college Finn has just started attending, even though Puck is not enrolled there. He appears less frequently this season, despite still being credited as a series regular.

=== Season 5 ===
Puck makes infrequent guest appearances starting from this season. Puck is devastated by Finn's death. In "The Quarterback", three weeks after the funeral, he steals a memorial tree planted for Finn and demands that Kurt, Finn's stepbrother, give him Finn's football jacket. Coach Beiste takes him to task for being drunk regularly after so many weeks, and the two mourn Finn together, but Beiste tells him he has to guide his own life without Finn's help, and asks him to replant the tree. When he later does so, he tells her that he intends to join the Air Force. In "100" Now in the Air Force, Puck comes back to McKinley to say goodbye to the Glee Club before it is disbanded. He sees Quinn and the two of them have a conversation. He is about to tell Quinn that he still has feelings for her when her boyfriend, Biff McIntosh, shows up and shows Puck that he is rude. Puck sings Avril Lavigne's song Keep Holding On to her hoping that this would win her heart, but she turns him down stating that she loves Biff. Later, Quinn and Biff are having dinner at Breadsticks when Santana, Puck, Mike, and Artie show up. They sit with Quinn at her table and Biff reveals that he doesn't know any thing about Quinn's past. Her friends tell her about her behavior in the episode The Purple Piano Project. Quinn asks Biff to get something out of the car for her and after he leaves, she asks her friends not to mention anything to Biff since she is ashamed of her past. Puck asks her if she is ever going to tell him about their relationship and their daughter, Beth, and she says that she will eventually. This somewhat angers Puck as he tells her that she can't hide from the past and should embrace it. A few days later, Puck is hanging by the school buses when he hears Quinn and Biff fighting. Biff becomes angry with her at the fact that she kept so much from him, including having a baby with Puck. He calls her a slut, causing Puck to snap and punch him. Biff punches Puck back, causing Puck to punch him once more and then throws him into the dumpster. He then tells Quinn that she can help Biff out of the dumpster or join her real friends in the choir room. Later, Puck and Quinn are in the locker room looking at Finn's plaque. Quinn tells Puck that Biff went back to Yale by himself, and the relationship is over. Puck reveals that he still has feelings for her and wants to get back together. Quinn tells Puck that she isn't going to look back to her past, as she wants to look into her future. Puck leaves the locker room heartbroken and storms down the hallway when Quinn runs after him and kisses him, agreeing to give their relationship another chance.

=== Season 6 ===
Puck returns in "Homecoming" along with fellow New Directions alumni to help Rachel and Kurt rebuild the club. He is still dating Quinn. Later in the season he attends Santana and Brittany's (and eventually also Blaine Anderson (Darren Criss) and Kurt's) wedding in "A Wedding". He appears in the "Pilot" parallel episode "2009", taunting Tina Cohen-Chang's (then fake) stutter alongside Karofsky. He last appears in the series during the rededication of McKinley's auditorium to Finn Hudson and take a bow with the rest of the Glee Cast in the series finale.

== Musical performances ==
As Puck, Salling features in many songs that have been released as singles available for digital download and are also featured in the show's soundtrack albums. He usually accompanies himself on the guitar for solo songs, including "Sweet Caroline", "Only the Good Die Young", "Fat Bottomed Girls", and the song ostensibly composed by Puck, "Big Ass Heart".

Neil Diamond's "Sweet Caroline" was his first solo number, in the episode "Mash-Up", and received favorable reviews from critics, and also from Diamond himself, who had initially been reluctant to license the number to the show. Following the episode's broadcast, Diamond posted his approval on the social networking website Twitter, writing: "Hey, so who's this guy Puck singing 'Sweet Caroline' so good, so good, so good on #Glee? Loved it!!" Raymund Flandez of The Wall Street Journal described Puck's voice on the song as "earthly, sensual and full", and Entertainment Weekly's Michael Slezak said that Salling did "more than a serviceable job". "Sweet Caroline" was released as a single, available for digital download, and charted at number 34 in the US, 22 in Canada and 37 in Australia.

== Reception ==
=== Critical response ===
Salling's performance as Puck received some positive reviews. Flandez said of Puck in the first-season episode "Mash-Up" that we finally saw him "emerging from his bonehead-punk exterior", and that he "wows us with his sensitive, cool guy turn as a solo singer" performing “Sweet Caroline”. In her review of the following episode, "Wheels", Emily VanDerWerff of The A.V. Club wrote, "Mark Salling just seems to have a ridiculous amount of chemistry with all of the female cast members in the show, and it's fun to see him and Dianna Agron get in that food fight. Again, fun stuff, but a serious emotional core that keeps the show grounded."

Television critics responded positively to the pairing of Puck and Lauren Zizes. Robert Canning of IGN said the "absolute best part" of the "Silly Love Songs" episode was Puck's "unexpected longing for Lauren Zizes." Emily VanDerWerff of The A.V. Club commented: "For me, the episode's highlight was the very sweet, funny courtship between Puck and Lauren. This may be because the writers have trouble writing for a self-professed bad boy, even though his escapades are straight out of Archie comics and not actually all that “bad” at all. But it's always fun to watch Salling sing, and it's always fun to watch him be smitten. Fink ends up being a good match for him, chemistry-wise, as she projects a confidence and certainty that makes it immediately obvious just what Puck sees in Lauren. The storyline also played out like both characters had something approaching real feelings." In the following episode, VanDerWerff found her relationship with Puck "a lot less assured" than before, but Entertainment Weekly's Sandra Gonzalez deemed their scenes "as endearing as they are unrealistic", and E! Online's Jenna Mullins wrote that "the ice around [her] heart melted just a bit when Puck mouthed Lauren that little bit of encouragement at the start of her solo."

Puck and Shelby's kiss in the "Pot o' Gold" episode was characterized as "creepy" and "super awkward" by AOLTV's Crystal Bell, as either "super creepy" or "romantic" by BuddyTV's John Kubicek, and as "groan-inducing" in the "You're actually going to go there?" vein by Canning. Critics were polarized by Puck and Shelby's sexual encounter in the "I Kissed a Girl" episode. Kubicek declared that "the dumbest storyline Glee has ever done gets even dumber," MTV contributor Kevin Sullivan called it "the most divisive plot line of the season", and Bell asked, "Instead of these super creepy scenes between Puck and Shelby, can we please get more screen time for Shelby and Rachel?"

=== Accolades ===
In 2010, Salling was nominated for the Teen Choice Award for Choice TV: Breakout Star Male for his performance as Puck. His Glee castmate, Kevin McHale (Artie), was also nominated in that category, but neither actor won the award. In 2011, he was nominated for the Teen Choice Award for Choice TV: Scene Stealer Male along with Glee castmate Chris Colfer (Kurt); again, neither actor won.
