= List of songs in Glee season 2 =

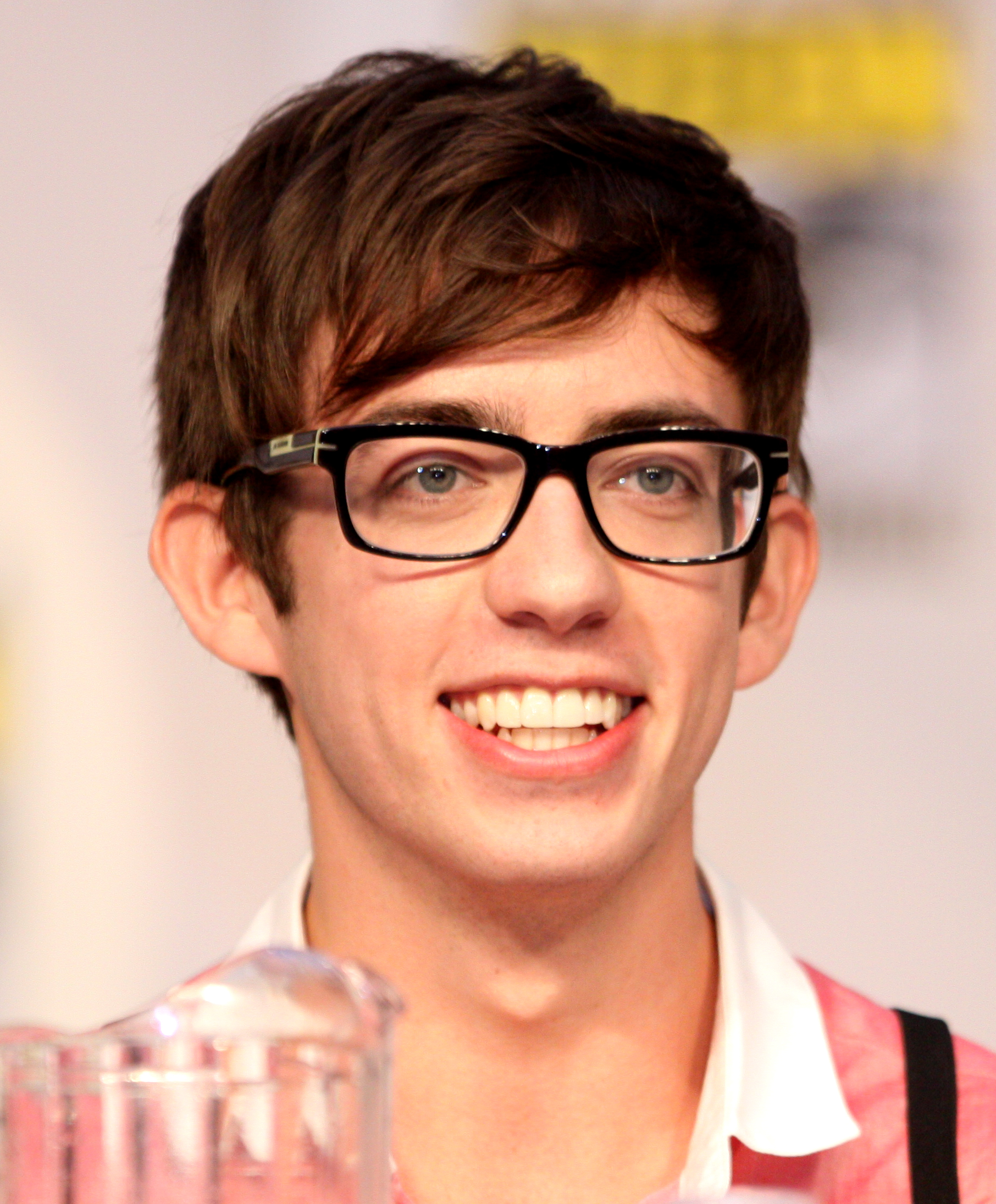
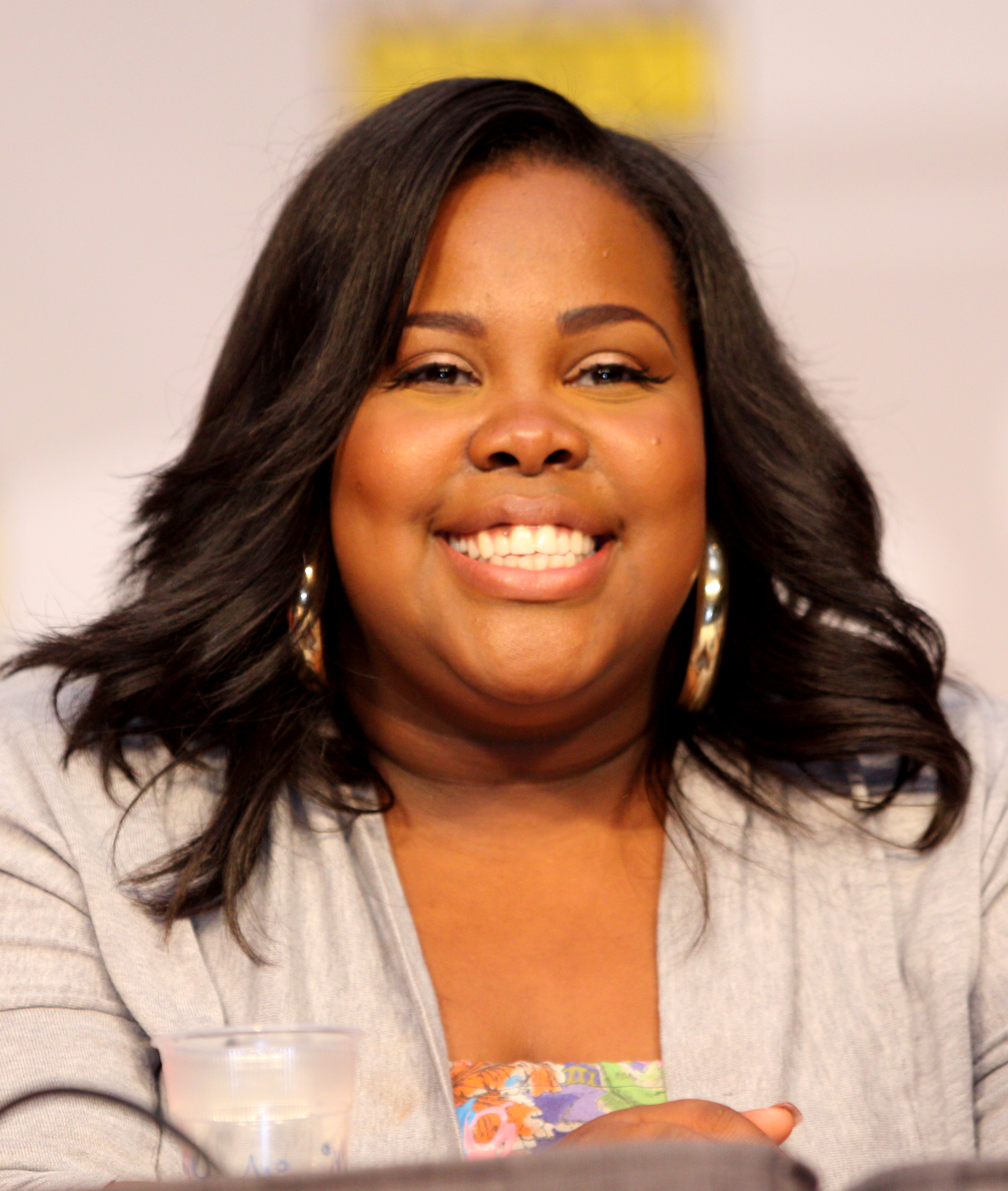
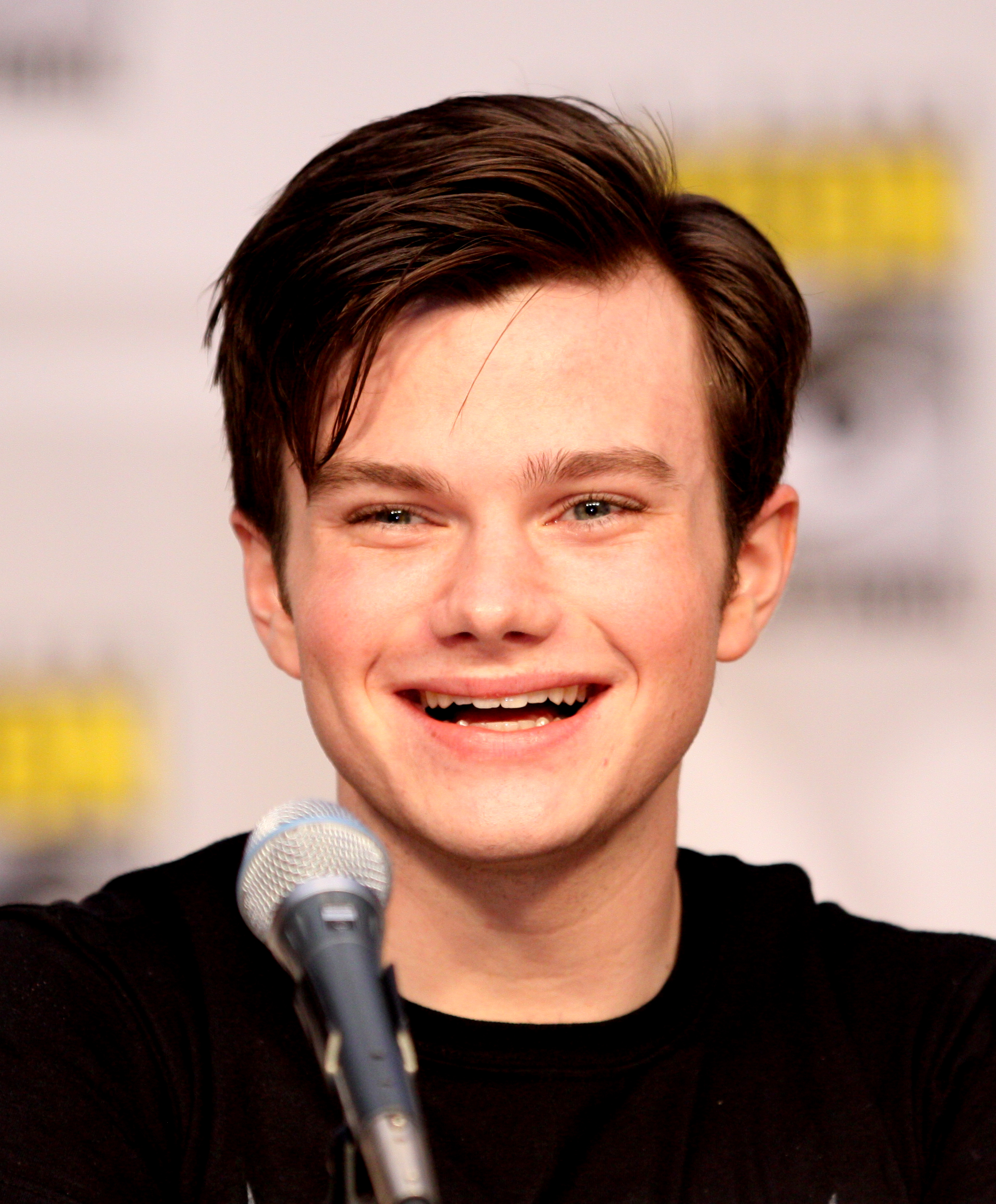
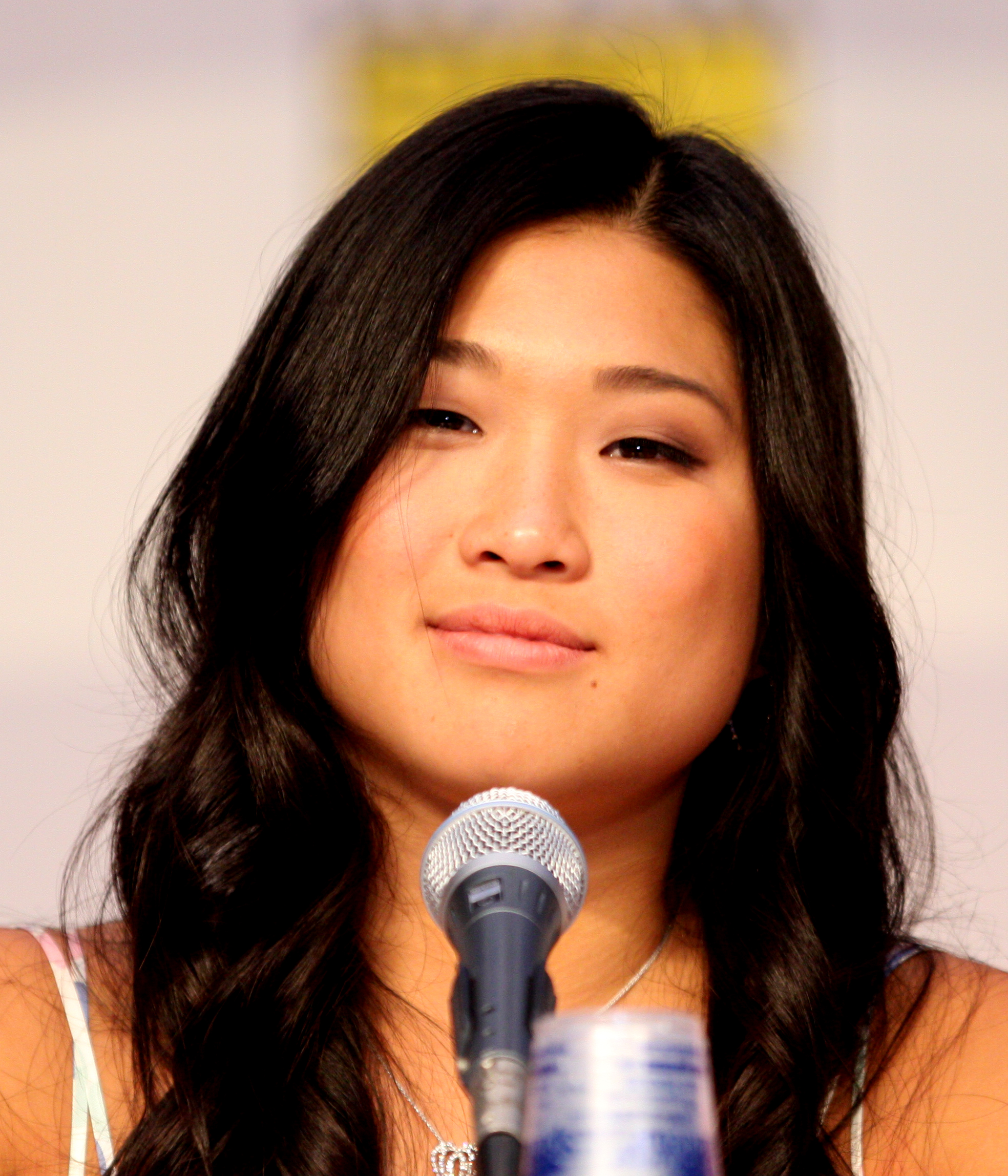
Kevin McHale, Amber Riley, Chris Colfer and Jenna Ushkowitz play original New Directions members Artie Abrams, Mercedes Jones, Kurt Hummel and Tina Cohen-Chang.

Glee is an American musical comedy-drama television series produced by Fox. It focuses on the glee club New Directions, at the fictional William McKinley High School in Lima, Ohio. The show was created by Ryan Murphy, Brad Falchuk and Ian Brennan, and features many cover versions of songs sung on-screen by the characters. Murphy is responsible for selecting all of the songs used, and strives to maintain a balance between show tunes and chart hits, as he wants there to be "something for everybody in every episode." Once Murphy selects a song, rights are cleared with its publishers by music supervisor P.J. Bloom, and music producer Adam Anders rearranges it for the Glee cast. Numbers are pre-recorded by the cast, while choreographer Zach Woodlee constructs the accompanying dance moves, which are then taught to the cast and filmed. Studio recordings of tracks are then made. The process begins six to eight weeks before each episode is filmed, and can end as late as the day before filming begins. For the first thirteen episodes of Glee's first season, the show averaged five songs per episode, which increased to eight songs for the final nine episodes. In season two, Glee averaged six songs per episode. The list below contains all 138 musical performances of the second season, with each performance delivering an individual song or a mashup of two or more songs in a single performance.

Songs featured on the show are available for digital download through the iTunes Store up to two weeks before new episodes air, and through other digital outlets and mobile carriers a week later. The season has featured three tribute episodes: "Britney/Brittany", showcasing songs by Britney Spears; "The Rocky Horror Glee Show", an episode featuring songs from The Rocky Horror Show;, and "Rumours", the first episode to pay tribute to an album, Fleetwood Mac's Rumours. Another episode in the season featured original songs. Glee: The Music, The Rocky Horror Glee Show, an extended play (EP) with songs from the fifth episode, was released October 19, 2010. Two soundtrack albums, Glee: The Music, The Christmas Album and Glee: The Music, Volume 4, were both released in November 2010. The series' sixth soundtrack album, Glee: The Music, Volume 5, was released in March 2011, and its seventh, Glee: The Music Presents the Warblers, saw its release the following month. An eighth, Glee: The Music, Volume 6, was released on May 23, 2011.

== Performers ==
The majority of songs are performed by New Directions, which is composed of Artie Abrams (Kevin McHale), Rachel Berry (Lea Michele), Mike Chang (Harry Shum, Jr.), Tina Cohen-Chang (Jenna Ushkowitz), Sam Evans (Chord Overstreet), Quinn Fabray (Dianna Agron), Finn Hudson (Cory Monteith), Kurt Hummel (Chris Colfer), Mercedes Jones (Amber Riley), Santana Lopez (Naya Rivera), Brittany S. Pierce (Heather Morris) and Noah Puckerman (Mark Salling), plus club director Will Schuester (Matthew Morrison). At the end of "Furt", however, Kurt enrolls in Dalton Academy and joins the Warblers; McKinley high student Lauren Zizes (Ashley Fink) takes his place, and remains in New Directions even after Kurt returns to McKinley in "Born This Way". During season two, New Directions is joined by transfer student and athlete Sam Evans (Chord Overstreet), and McKinley High foreign exchange student Sunshine Corazon (Charice) tries out for New Directions, but although she is accepted, transfers instead to Carmel High and joins its glee club, Vocal Adrenaline. Jayma Mays performs as school guidance counselor Emma Pillsbury, and guest stars John Stamos, Dot-Marie Jones and Kristin Chenoweth perform as dentist Carl Howell, football coach Shannon Beiste and April Rhodes, respectively. Darren Criss appears as Blaine Anderson, lead singer of rival glee club the Dalton Academy Warblers, and Gwyneth Paltrow guest-stars and performs as Holly Holliday, a substitute teacher. Cheerleading coach Sue Sylvester (Jane Lynch) performs with her mother Doris (Carol Burnett) and once with New Directions. As in the first season, Lynch and Mays are credits with vocals on some soundtrack albums despite not being featured on screen for any of the songs.

Songs included on Glee: The Music, The Rocky Horror Glee Show feature additional vocals by non-cast members Adam Anders, Nikki Anders, Kamari Copeland, Tim Davis, Missi Hale, Tobias Kampe-Flygare, Storm Lee, David Loucks, and Windy Wagner. These performers reappear on Glee: The Music, Volume 4, and are joined by Kala Balch, Colin Benward, Ravaughn Brown, Jon Hall, Samantha Jade, Jeanette Olsson, Zac Poor, Drew Ryan Scott, and Onitsha Shaw. All but Benward, Jade, Kampe-Flygare, Olsson and Poor feature on Glee: The Music, Volume 5, which also includes vocals by Alex Anders. Songs performed by the Dalton Academy Warblers contain vocals by the Beelzebubs, an a cappella group from Tufts University. The members providing these background vocals consist of Sam Cantor, Conor Flynn, Michael Grant, John Kwon, Cailin Mackenzie, Kent McCann, Eric Morrissey, Evan Powell, Penn Rosen, Eli Seidman, and Jack Thomas. Only one of the thirteen songs on Glee: The Music Presents the Warblers did not feature the Beelzebubs: "Blackbird", which was sung by Chris Colfer with other backing vocalists; the album featured additional vocals by Adam Anders, Nikki Anders, Shoshana Bean, Davis, Lee, Loucks, Olsson, Shaw and Wagner. These performers, with the exception of Bean, plus Alex Anders, Bach, Brown, Copeland and Scott, are featured on Glee: The Music, Volume 6. While recurring cast members Shum, Jr. and Fink perform in the group numbers on screen, neither is credited with performing vocally on any soundtrack albums.

== Songs ==
List of songs in Glee season two
Title	Version covered	Performed by	Episode	Single	Album	Ref.
"Empire State of Mind"	Jay-Z feat. Alicia Keys	Santana Lopez, Noah Puckerman, Mercedes Jones, Finn Hudson, Rachel Berry and Artie Abrams with New Directions	1. "Audition"	Yes	Volume 4	
"Every Rose Has Its Thorn"	Poison	Sam Evans	1. "Audition"	No	TBA	
"Telephone"	Lady Gaga feat. Beyoncé	Sunshine Corazon and Rachel Berry	1. "Audition"	Yes	The Complete Season Two	
"Getting to Know You"	The King and I	Tina Cohen-Chang	1. "Audition"	No	TBA	
"Billionaire"	Travie McCoy feat. Bruno Mars	Sam Evans with New Directions males except Kurt Hummel	1. "Audition"	Yes	Volume 4	
"The Power" (Note: Dance performances.)	Snap!	Finn Hudson	1. "Audition"	No	TBA	
"Listen"	Dreamgirls	Sunshine Corazon	1. "Audition"	Yes	The Complete Season Two	
"What I Did for Love"	A Chorus Line	Rachel Berry	1. "Audition"	Yes	Love Songs	
"I'm a Slave 4 U"	Britney Spears	Brittany S. Pierce	2. "Britney/Brittany"	Yes	Dance Party	
"Me Against the Music"	Britney Spears feat. Madonna	Brittany S. Pierce and Santana Lopez	2. "Britney/Brittany"	Yes	Volume 4	
"...Baby One More Time"	Britney Spears	Rachel Berry	2. "Britney/Brittany"	Yes	The Complete Season Two	
"Sailing"	Christopher Cross	Will Schuester	2. "Britney/Brittany"	No	TBA	
"Stronger"	Britney Spears	Artie Abrams with McKinley High Titans	2. "Britney/Brittany"	Yes	Volume 4	
"Toxic"	Britney Spears	Brittany S. Pierce, Santana Lopez, Will Schuester, Rachel Berry and Tina Cohen-Chang with New Directions	2. "Britney/Brittany"	Yes	Volume 4	
"The Only Exception"	Paramore	Rachel Berry with Quinn Fabray, Mercedes Jones and Santana Lopez	2. "Britney/Brittany"	Yes	Volume 4	
"Only the Good Die Young"	Billy Joel	Noah Puckerman with New Directions	3. "Grilled Cheesus"	Yes	The Complete Season Two	
"I Look to You"	Whitney Houston	Mercedes Jones with Quinn Fabray and Tina Cohen-Chang	3. "Grilled Cheesus"	Yes	The Complete Season Two	
"Papa, Can You Hear Me?"	Barbra Streisand	Rachel Berry	3. "Grilled Cheesus"	Yes	The Complete Season Two	
"I Want to Hold Your Hand"	The Beatles	Kurt Hummel	3. "Grilled Cheesus"	Yes	Volume 4	
"Losing My Religion"	R.E.M.	Finn Hudson	3. "Grilled Cheesus"	Yes	The Complete Season Two	
"Bridge over Troubled Water"	Aretha Franklin	Mercedes Jones with church choir	3. "Grilled Cheesus"	Yes	The Complete Season Two	
"One of Us"	Joan Osborne	New Directions	3. "Grilled Cheesus"	Yes	Volume 4	
"Don't Go Breaking My Heart"	Elton John and Kiki Dee	Rachel Berry and Finn Hudson	4. "Duets"	Yes	Love Songs	
"River Deep – Mountain High"	Ike & Tina Turner	Mercedes Jones and Santana Lopez	4. "Duets"	Yes	Volume 4	
"Le Jazz Hot!"	Victor/Victoria	Kurt Hummel	4. "Duets"	Yes	The Complete Season Two	
"Sing!"	A Chorus Line	Mike Chang and Tina Cohen-Chang with New Directions	4. "Duets"	Yes	The Complete Season Two	
"With You I'm Born Again"	Billy Preston and Syreeta Wright	Rachel Berry and Finn Hudson	4. "Duets"	No	TBA	
"Lucky"	Jason Mraz and Colbie Caillat	Sam Evans and Quinn Fabray	4. "Duets"	Yes	Volume 4	
"Get Happy" / "Happy Days Are Here Again"	Judy Garland and Barbra Streisand	Rachel Berry and Kurt Hummel	4. "Duets"	Yes	The Complete Season Two	
"Science Fiction/Double Feature"	The Rocky Horror Show	Santana Lopez	5. "The Rocky Horror Glee Show"	Yes	The Rocky Horror Glee Show	
"Over at the Frankenstein Place"	The Rocky Horror Show	Rachel Berry and Finn Hudson with New Directions	5. "The Rocky Horror Glee Show"	Yes	The Rocky Horror Glee Show	
"Dammit Janet"	The Rocky Horror Show	Finn Hudson and Rachel Berry with Quinn Fabray, Kurt Hummel and Mercedes Jones	5. "The Rocky Horror Glee Show"	Yes	The Rocky Horror Glee Show	
"Hot Patootie - Bless My Soul" (Whatever Happened To Saturday Night?)	The Rocky Horror Show	Carl Howell with New Directions	5. "The Rocky Horror Glee Show"	No	TBA	
"Sweet Transvestite"	The Rocky Horror Show	Mercedes Jones with Brittany S. Pierce and Santana Lopez	5. "The Rocky Horror Glee Show"	Yes	The Rocky Horror Glee Show	
"Touch-a, Touch-a, Touch-a, Touch Me"	The Rocky Horror Show	Emma Pillsbury, Santana Lopez and Brittany S. Pierce with Will Schuester, Kurt Hummel, Carl Howell and Finn Hudson	5. "The Rocky Horror Glee Show"	Yes	The Rocky Horror Glee Show	
"Time Warp"	The Rocky Horror Show	New Directions	5. "The Rocky Horror Glee Show"	Yes	The Rocky Horror Glee Show	
"One Love/People Get Ready"	Bob Marley & The Wailers	Noah Puckerman and Artie Abrams	6. "Never Been Kissed"	Yes	Volume 4	
"Teenage Dream" (Note: Also included on Glee: The Music Presents the Warblers.)	Katy Perry	Dalton Academy Warblers	6. "Never Been Kissed"	Yes	Volume 4	
"Start Me Up" / "Livin' On A Prayer"	The Rolling Stones / Bon Jovi	New Directions females	6. "Never Been Kissed"	Yes	The Complete Season Two	
"Stop! In The Name Of Love" / "Free Your Mind"	The Supremes / En Vogue	New Directions males	6. "Never Been Kissed"	Yes	The Complete Season Two	
"Conjunction Junction"	Schoolhouse Rock!	Holly Holliday	7. "The Substitute"	No	TBA	
"Forget You"	Cee Lo Green	Holly Holliday, Artie Abrams, Mercedes Jones and Santana Lopez with New Directions except Rachel Berry	7. "The Substitute"	Yes	Volume 4	
"Make 'Em Laugh"	Donald O'Connor	Will Schuester with Mike Chang	7. "The Substitute"	Yes	The Complete Season Two	
"Nowadays / Hot Honey Rag"	Chicago	Holly Holliday and Rachel Berry	7. "The Substitute"	Yes	The Complete Season Two	
"Singin' In The Rain" / "Umbrella"	Gene Kelly / Rihanna feat. Jay-Z	Holly Holliday and Will Schuester with Artie Abrams and New Directions	7. "The Substitute"	Yes	The Complete Season Two	
"Ohio"	Wonderful Town	Sue Sylvester and Doris Sylvester	8. "Furt"	Yes	The Complete Season Two	
"Marry You"	Bruno Mars	New Directions	8. "Furt"	Yes	Volume 4	
"Sway"	Michael Bublé	Will Schuester	8. "Furt"	Yes	Volume 4	
"Just The Way You Are"	Bruno Mars	Finn Hudson with New Directions	8. "Furt"	Yes	Volume 4	
"Don't Cry For Me Argentina"	Evita	Rachel Berry and Kurt Hummel	9. "Special Education"	Yes	The Complete Season Two	
"The Living Years"	Mike + The Mechanics	The Hipsters	9. "Special Education"	Yes	The Complete Season Two	
"Hey, Soul Sister"	Train	Dalton Academy Warblers	9. "Special Education"	Yes	Presents the Warblers	
"(I've Had) The Time of My Life"	Bill Medley and Jennifer Warnes	Sam Evans and Quinn Fabray with Santana Lopez, Mercedes Jones and New Directions	9. "Special Education"	Yes	Volume 4	
"Valerie"	Mark Ronson feat. Amy Winehouse	Santana Lopez with New Directions	9. "Special Education"	Yes	Volume 4	
"Dog Days Are Over"	Florence and the Machine	Tina Cohen-Chang and Mercedes Jones with New Directions	9. "Special Education"	Yes	The Complete Season Two	
"The Most Wonderful Day of the Year"	Rudolph the Red-Nosed Reindeer	Artie Abrams, Brittany S. Pierce, Quinn Fabray (Kurt Hummel), Sam Evans and Tina Cohen-Chang with New Directions	10. "A Very Glee Christmas"	Yes	The Christmas Album	
"We Need a Little Christmas"	Mame	Mercedes Jones with New Directions	10. "A Very Glee Christmas"	Yes	The Christmas Album	
"Merry Christmas Darling"	The Carpenters	Rachel Berry	10. "A Very Glee Christmas"	Yes	The Christmas Album	
"Baby, It's Cold Outside"	Frank Loesser and Lynn Garland	Kurt Hummel and Blaine Anderson	10. "A Very Glee Christmas"	Yes	The Christmas Album	
"You're a Mean One, Mr. Grinch"	How the Grinch Stole Christmas!	Will Schuester and k.d. lang	10. "A Very Glee Christmas"	Yes	The Christmas Album	
"Last Christmas"	Wham!	Rachel Berry and Finn Hudson	10. "A Very Glee Christmas"	Yes	The Christmas Album	
"Welcome Christmas"	How the Grinch Stole Christmas!	New Directions	10. "A Very Glee Christmas"	Yes	The Complete Season Two	
"California Gurls"	Katy Perry feat. Snoop Dogg	McKinley High Cheerios	11. "The Sue Sylvester Shuffle"	No	TBA	
"Need You Now"	Lady Antebellum	Rachel Berry and Noah Puckerman	11. "The Sue Sylvester Shuffle"	Yes	Volume 5	
"She's Not There"	The Zombies	New Direction Males with McKinley High Titans	11. "The Sue Sylvester Shuffle"	Yes	Volume 5	
"Bills, Bills, Bills"	Destiny's Child	Dalton Academy Warblers	11. "The Sue Sylvester Shuffle"	Yes	Presents the Warblers	
"Thriller" / "Heads Will Roll"	Michael Jackson / Yeah Yeah Yeahs	Santana Lopez, Artie Abrams and Finn Hudson with New Directions and McKinley High Titans	11. "The Sue Sylvester Shuffle"	Yes	Volume 5	
"Fat Bottomed Girls"	Queen	Noah Puckerman with New Directions males	12. "Silly Love Songs"	Yes	Volume 5	
"P.Y.T. (Pretty Young Thing)"	Michael Jackson	Artie Abrams with Mike Chang and New Directions	12. "Silly Love Songs"	Yes	Volume 5	
"When I Get You Alone"	Robin Thicke	Dalton Academy Warblers	12. "Silly Love Songs"	Yes	Presents the Warblers	
"My Funny Valentine"	Babes in Arms	Tina Cohen-Chang	12. "Silly Love Songs"	No	TBA	
"Firework"	Katy Perry	Rachel Berry with New Directions females	12. "Silly Love Songs"	Yes	Volume 5	
"Silly Love Songs"	Wings	Dalton Academy Warblers	12. "Silly Love Songs"	Yes	Presents the Warblers	
"Baby"	Justin Bieber feat. Ludacris	Sam Evans	13. "Comeback"	Yes	Volume 5	
"Somebody to Love"	Justin Bieber	Sam Evans, Artie Abrams, Noah Puckerman and Mike Chang	13. "Comeback"	Yes	Volume 5	
"Take Me or Leave Me"	Rent	Rachel Berry and Mercedes Jones	13. "Comeback"	Yes	Volume 5	
"This Little Light of Mine"	Traditional	Will Schuester, Sue Sylvester and pediatric patients	13. "Comeback"	No	TBA	
"I Know What Boys Like"	The Waitresses	Lauren Zizes with Brittany S. Pierce and Tina Cohen-Chang	13. "Comeback"	Yes	Dance Party	
"Sing"	My Chemical Romance	Rachel Berry and Finn Hudson with New Directions and Sue Sylvester	13. "Comeback"	Yes	Volume 5	
"My Headband"	Original composition	Rachel Berry	14. "Blame It on the Alcohol"	No	TBA	
"Don't You Want Me"	The Human League	Rachel Berry and Blaine Anderson	14. "Blame It on the Alcohol"	Yes	Volume 5	
"Blame It"	Jamie Foxx feat. T-Pain	Artie Abrams, Noah Puckerman, Mercedes Jones and Santana Lopez with New Directions	14. "Blame It on the Alcohol"	Yes	Dance Party	
"One Bourbon, One Scotch, One Beer"	George Thorogood	Shannon Beiste and Will Schuester	14. "Blame It on the Alcohol"	Yes	The Complete Season Two	
"Tik Tok"	Ke$ha	Brittany S. Pierce with New Directions	14. "Blame It on the Alcohol"	Yes	Dance Party	
"Do You Wanna Touch Me (Oh Yeah)" (Note: Omitted from the UK edition of Glee: The Music, Volume 5.)	Joan Jett	Holly Holliday with New Directions	15. "Sexy"	Yes	Volume 5	
"Animal"	Neon Trees	Blaine Anderson, Kurt Hummel and the Dalton Academy Warblers	15. "Sexy"	Yes	Presents the Warblers	
"Kiss"	Prince and The Revolution	Will Schuester and Holly Holliday	15. "Sexy"	Yes	Volume 5	
"Landslide"	Fleetwood Mac and Dixie Chicks	Holly Holliday with Santana Lopez and Brittany S. Pierce	15. "Sexy"	Yes	Volume 5	
"Afternoon Delight" (Note: Included on the UK edition of Glee: The Music, Volume 5.)	Starland Vocal Band	Carl Howell, Noah Puckerman, Rachel Berry, Emma Pillsbury and Quinn Fabray	15. "Sexy"	Yes	The Complete Season Two	
"Misery"	Maroon 5	Dalton Academy Warblers	16. "Original Song"	Yes	Presents the Warblers	
"Only Child"	Original composition	Rachel Berry	16. "Original Song"	No	TBA	
"Blackbird"	The Beatles	Kurt Hummel with the Dalton Academy Warblers	16. "Original Song"	Yes	Presents the Warblers	
"Trouty Mouth"	Original composition	Santana Lopez	16. "Original Song"	Yes	The Complete Season Two	
"Big Ass Heart"	Original composition	Noah Puckerman	16. "Original Song"	Yes	The Complete Season Two	
"Hell to the No"	Original composition	Mercedes Jones with Tina Cohen-Chang, Santana Lopez, Brittany S. Pierce and Lauren Zizes	16. "Original Song"	Yes	The Complete Season Two	
"Jesus Is My Friend"	Sonseed	Aural Intensity	16. "Original Song"	No	TBA	
"Candles"	Hey Monday	Blaine Anderson, Kurt Hummel and the Dalton Academy Warblers	16. "Original Song"	Yes	Presents the Warblers	
"Raise Your Glass"	Pink	Dalton Academy Warblers	16. "Original Song"	Yes	Presents the Warblers	
"Get It Right"	Original composition	Rachel Berry with Brittany S. Pierce, Tina Cohen-Chang and New Directions females	16. "Original Song"	Yes	Volume 5	
"Loser like Me"	Original composition	Rachel Berry, Santana Lopez, Finn Hudson and Brittany S. Pierce with New Directions	16. "Original Song"	Yes	Volume 5	
"All by Myself"	Céline Dion	Sunshine Corazon	17. "A Night of Neglect"	Yes	The Complete Season Two	
"I Follow Rivers"	Lykke Li	Tina Cohen-Chang	17. "A Night of Neglect"	Yes	The Complete Season Two	
"Bubble Toes"	Jack Johnson	Mike Chang	17. "A Night of Neglect"	No	TBA	
"Turning Tables"	Adele	Holly Holliday	17. "A Night of Neglect"	Yes	Volume 6	
"Ain't No Way"	Aretha Franklin	Mercedes Jones with church choir	17. "A Night of Neglect"	Yes	The Complete Season Two	
"I Feel Pretty" / "Unpretty"	West Side Story / TLC	Quinn Fabray and Rachel Berry	18. "Born This Way"	Yes	Volume 6	
"I've Gotta Be Me"	Sammy Davis, Jr.	Finn Hudson with Mike Chang	18. "Born This Way"	Yes	The Complete Season Two	
"Somewhere Only We Know"	Keane	Blaine Anderson with Dalton Academy Warblers	18. "Born This Way"	Yes	Presents the Warblers	
"As If We Never Said Goodbye"	Sunset Boulevard	Kurt Hummel	18. "Born This Way"	Yes	Volume 6	
"Barbra Streisand"	Duck Sauce	New Directions with mall flash mob	18. "Born This Way"	No	TBA	
"Born This Way"	Lady Gaga	Tina Cohen-Chang, Mercedes Jones, and Kurt Hummel with New Directions	18. "Born This Way"	Yes	Volume 6	
"Dreams"	Fleetwood Mac	April Rhodes and Will Schuester	19. "Rumours"	Yes	Volume 6	
"Never Going Back Again"	Fleetwood Mac	Artie Abrams	19. "Rumours"	Yes	The Complete Season Two	
"Songbird"	Fleetwood Mac	Santana Lopez	19. "Rumours"	Yes	Volume 6	
"I Don't Want to Know"	Fleetwood Mac	Quinn Fabray and Finn Hudson	19. "Rumours"	Yes	The Complete Season Two	
"Nice to Meet You, Have I Slept with You?"	Original composition	April Rhodes and Will Schuester	19. "Rumours"	No	TBA	
"Go Your Own Way"	Fleetwood Mac	Rachel Berry	19. "Rumours"	Yes	Volume 6	
"Don't Stop"	Fleetwood Mac	Sam Evans, Quinn Fabray, Finn Hudson and Rachel Berry with New Directions	19. "Rumours"	Yes	Volume 6	
"Rolling in the Deep"	Adele covered by John Legend	Rachel Berry and Jesse St. James with the AV club	20. "Prom Queen"	Yes	Volume 6	
"Isn't She Lovely?"	Stevie Wonder	Artie Abrams with Finn Hudson, Sam Evans, Noah Puckerman and Mike Chang	20. "Prom Queen"	Yes	Volume 6	
"Friday"	Rebecca Black	Artie Abrams, Sam Evans and Noah Puckerman	20. "Prom Queen"	Yes	The Complete Season Two	
"Jar of Hearts"	Christina Perri	Rachel Berry	20. "Prom Queen"	Yes	The Complete Season Two	
"I'm Not Gonna Teach Your Boyfriend How to Dance with You"	Black Kids	Blaine Anderson with Tina Cohen-Chang and Brittany S. Pierce	20. "Prom Queen"	Yes	Dance Party	
"Dancing Queen"	ABBA	Santana Lopez and Mercedes Jones	20. "Prom Queen"	Yes	Volume 6	
"Back to Black"	Amy Winehouse	Santana Lopez	21. "Funeral"	Yes	The Complete Season Two	
"Some People"	Gypsy: A Musical Fable	Kurt Hummel	21. "Funeral"	Yes	The Complete Season Two	
"Try a Little Tenderness"	Otis Redding	Mercedes Jones	21. "Funeral"	Yes	Volume 6	
"My Man"	Barbra Streisand	Rachel Berry	21. "Funeral"	Yes	Volume 6	
"Pure Imagination"	Willy Wonka & the Chocolate Factory	Tina Cohen-Chang, Kurt Hummel, Finn Hudson and Artie Abrams with New Directions	21. "Funeral"	Yes	Volume 6	
"My Cup"	Original composition	Brittany S. Pierce and Artie Abrams	22. "New York"	Yes	The Complete Season Two	
"I Love New York" / "New York, New York"	Madonna / On the Town	Finn Hudson, Santana Lopez, Artie Abrams, Mercedes Jones, Rachel Berry and Brittany S. Pierce with New Directions	22. "New York"	Yes	The Complete Season Two	
"Still Got Tonight"	Matthew Morrison	Will Schuester	22. "New York"	No	Matthew Morrison	
"Bella Notte"	Lady and the Tramp	Noah Puckerman, Sam Evans, Mike Chang and Artie Abrams	22. "New York"	Yes	Volume 6	
"For Good"	Wicked	Rachel Berry and Kurt Hummel	22. "New York"	Yes	The Complete Season Two	
"Yeah!"	Usher feat. Lil Jon and Ludacris	Unnamed female a cappella group	22. "New York"	Yes	Dance Party	
"As Long as You're There"	Original composition	Sunshine Corazon with Vocal Adrenaline	22. "New York"	Yes	Volume 6	
"Pretending"	Original composition	Rachel Berry and Finn Hudson	22. "New York"	Yes	Volume 6	
"Light Up the World"	Original composition	Santana Lopez, Artie Abrams, Brittany S. Pierce, Rachel Berry, Finn Hudson and Tina Cohen-Chang with New Directions	22. "New York"	Yes	Volume 6	

== See also ==
- List of songs in Glee (season 1)
- List of songs in Glee (season 3)
- List of songs in Glee (season 4)
- List of songs in Glee (season 5)
- List of songs in Glee (season 6)
- Glee albums discography
