= Glee albums discography =

Glee cast discography
- Extended plays: 19
- Soundtrack albums: 16
- Compilation albums: 6
- Singles: 460

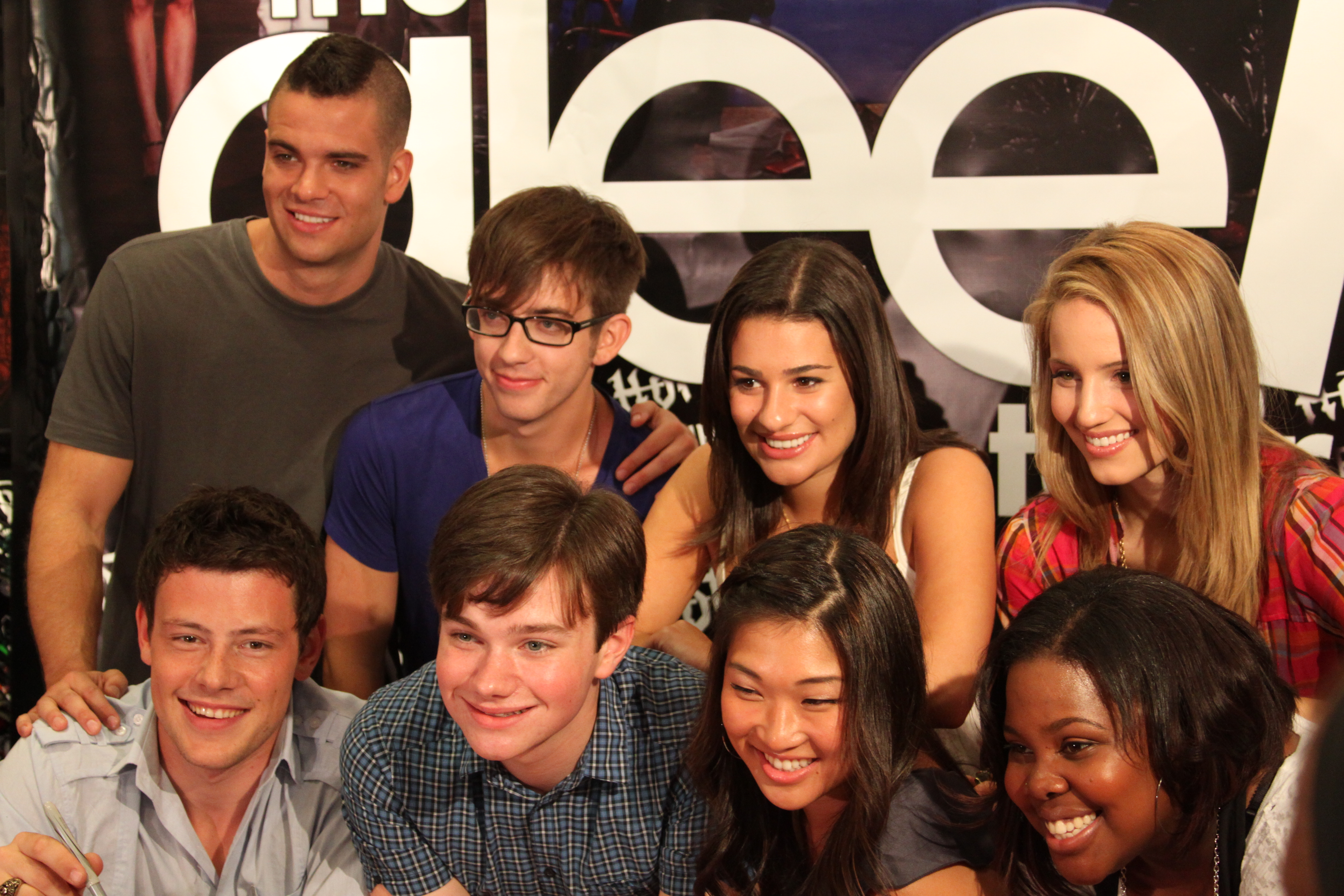
Glee cast members: (clockwise from back left) Mark Salling, Kevin McHale, Lea Michele, Dianna Agron, Amber Riley, Jenna Ushkowitz, Chris Colfer, and Cory Monteith

The Glee cast has released sixteen soundtrack albums, six compilation albums and eleven extended plays (EPs), containing 754 different performances of an individual song or a mashup of two or more songs in a single performance. Of the performances on the various albums and EPs, 460 were also released as singles. Glee features on-screen performance-based musical numbers, most of which are cover versions of popular songs, with genres ranging from R&B and pop to country and show tunes. The cast consists of fifteen main characters; some actors were cast following Broadway theatre experience while others were required to audition to prove singing and dancing capabilities. Recordings of performances on the show are sold as singles the week of broadcast, available for download.

For the first season, the group's debut album, Glee: The Music, Volume 1, was released by Columbia Records in November 2009, and peaked at number one in Ireland and the United Kingdom, three in Australia, and four in Canada and the United States. The album eventually went on to earn platinum certifications in these five countries, plus double platinum in Australia and triple platinum in Ireland. Debut single "Don't Stop Believin'", a cover of the 1981 Journey song, was a top ten hit, reaching number two in the UK and number four in Ireland and the US; it has since been certified platinum in the US and Australia. In December 2009, their second album, Glee: The Music, Volume 2, reached number one in New Zealand and Ireland. The EP Glee: The Music, The Power of Madonna saw release in April 2010 to accompany a Madonna tribute episode, and marked the cast's first number-one debut on the Billboard 200. Glee: The Music, Volume 3 Showstoppers was released in May 2010 and managed to debut in the top ten worldwide. Included on the track listing is a cover of The All-American Rejects' "Gives You Hell", which reached number one in Ireland, a first for the group. The season's releases concluded with an EP of the music from the season's final episode, Glee: The Music, Journey to Regionals, which reached number one on the US and Ireland charts, number two in the UK and Canada, and number three in Australia. Glee: The Music, The Complete Season One was a compilation album, which contained all one hundred studio recordings from the first season released on the first three volumes (Volume 1, Volume 2, and Volume 3 Showstoppers) and the first two extended plays (The Power of Madonna and Journey to Regionals), including bonus tracks. All singles from the first season were also included, with the exception of "Last Christmas". The album was released to the iTunes Store on September 14, 2010.

For the second season, the first release was the EP Glee: The Music, The Rocky Horror Glee Show, released to accompany the Rocky Horror tribute episode; it reached number six in the US in October 2010. Glee: The Music, The Christmas Album and Glee: The Music, Volume 4 were both released in November 2010; the former accompanies the last episode of the year. These albums both charted in the top ten in Canada and the US, and are the only two albums to have been certified platinum from the season, with the former achieving that in the US, and the latter in Australia. A limited edition EP Glee: The Music, Love Songs, sold only at Target stores, was released at the end of the year, and did not chart. Three more soundtracks albums, Glee: The Music, Volume 5, Glee: The Music Presents the Warblers, and Glee: The Music, Volume 6, were released for the season in 2011, all reaching the top five in Canada and the US. The cast holds the record for most charted songs by an act in the 53-year history of the Billboard Hot 100, with 207 appearances as of October 2013. Two singles, "Teenage Dream" and "Loser Like Me", charted in the top ten in the US and Canada, and both were certified gold in the US. The cast has also put 51 singles in the top 40 on the Billboard Hot 100, and are ahead of The Beatles as of October 2013, behind only Lil Wayne with 64, Elton John with 57 and Elvis Presley with 80. As of April 2013, the cast has sold more than 53 million songs and over 13 million albums worldwide including 48.3 million downloads, 8 million albums sold and 3.8 billion streams in the U.S. alone as of June 2024.

== Albums ==
=== Soundtrack albums ===
List of albums, with selected chart positions and certifications
Title	Album details	Peak chart positions											Certifications
Title	Album details	AUS	CAN	FRA	IRL	MEX	NL	NZ	SWI	UK	US	US Sound.	Certifications
Glee: The Music, Volume 1	Released: November 2, 2009; Label: Columbia (#754090); Format: CD, download	3	4	52	1	37	9	8	48	1	4	1	RIAA: Platinum; ARIA: 2× Platinum; BPI: Platinum; IRMA: 3× Platinum; MC: Platinum; RMNZ: Platinum
Glee: The Music, Volume 2	Released: December 8, 2009; Label: Columbia (#761705); Format: CD, download	8	5	74	1	39	16	1	—	2	3	1	RIAA: Gold; ARIA: Platinum; BPI: Platinum; IRMA: 2× Platinum; MC: Platinum; RMNZ: Gold
Glee: The Music, Volume 3 Showstoppers	Released: May 18, 2010; Label: Columbia (#770611); Format: CD, download	1	1	47	1	9	22	3	87	3	1	1	RIAA: Gold; ARIA: Platinum; BPI: Gold; IRMA: Platinum; RMNZ: Gold
Glee: The Music, The Christmas Album	Released: November 9, 2010; Label: Columbia (#778567); Format: CD, download	13	1	—	13	77	43	27	—	37	3	1	RIAA: Platinum; ARIA: Gold; BPI: Silver; IRMA: Gold
Glee: The Music, Volume 4	Released: November 26, 2010; Label: Columbia (#779214); Format: CD, download	3	6	126	12	8	24	9	—	4	5	1	RIAA: Gold; ARIA: Platinum; BPI: Gold; IRMA: Gold; RMNZ: Gold
Glee: The Music, Volume 5	Released: March 8, 2011; Label: Columbia (#785852); Format: CD, download	1	3	100	5	23	27	3	—	4	3	1	ARIA: Gold; BPI: Gold; RMNZ: Gold
Glee: The Music Presents the Warblers	Released: April 19, 2011; Label: Columbia; Format: CD, download	6	5	—	8	41	—	11	—	7	2	1	BPI: Silver
Glee: The Music, Volume 6	Released: May 23, 2011; Label: Columbia; Format: CD, download	3	4	—	4	49	83	3	—	6	4	1	ARIA: Gold; BPI: Gold
Glee: The 3D Concert Movie	Released: August 9, 2011; Label: Columbia; Format: CD, download	12	10	—	21	38	98	15	—	35	16	2	
Glee: The Music, The Christmas Album Volume 2	Released: November 15, 2011; Label: Columbia; Format: CD, download	24	6	—	46	—	—	—	—	60	6	1	
Glee: The Music, Volume 7	Released: December 6, 2011; Label: Columbia; Format: CD, download	18	—	—	41	—	47	25	—	55	9	1	ARIA: Gold; BPI: Silver
Glee: The Music, The Graduation Album	Released: May 15, 2012; Label: Columbia; Format: CD, download	12	6	—	14	—	—	21	—	17	8	1	
Glee: The Music, Season 4, Volume 1	Released: November 27, 2012; Label: Columbia; Format: CD, download	46	—	—	43	—	—	—	—	42	33	2	
Glee: The Music, The Christmas Album Volume 3	Released: December 11, 2012; Label: Columbia; Format: CD, download	68	—	—	—	—	—	—	—	— (Note: Glee: The Music, The Christmas Album Volume 3 did not enter the UK Top 100 Albums Chart, but peaked at number 33 on the UK Soundtrack Albums chart.)	20	2	
Glee Sings the Beatles	Released: September 24, 2013; Label: Columbia; Format: CD, download	48	—	—	92	—	—	—	—	89	38	2	
Glee: The Music – Celebrating 100 Episodes	Released: March 25, 2014; Label: Columbia; Format: CD, download	35	—	—	—	—	—	—	—	—	22	3	
"—" denotes a release that did not chart.

=== Compilation albums ===
List of albums, with selected chart positions
Title	Album details	Peak positions				Certifications
Title	Album details	AUS	IRL	UK	UK Comp.	Certifications
Glee: The Music, The Complete Season One	Released: September 14, 2010; Label: Columbia; Format: Download	—	—	—	71	
Glee: The Music, Best of Season One	Released: November 15, 2010; Label: Columbia; Format: CD, download	—	27	41	96	BPI: Gold
Glee: The Music, The Complete Season One CD Collection	Released: December 10, 2010; Label: Columbia (88697839112); Format: CD box set	45	—	—	—	
Glee: The Music, The Complete Season Two	Released: August 28, 2012; Label: Columbia; Format: Download	—	—	—	60	BPI: Silver
Glee: The Music, The Complete Season Three	Released: August 28, 2012; Label: Columbia; Format: Download	—	—	—	—	
Glee: The Music, The Complete Season Four	Released: January 14, 2014; Label: Columbia; Format: Download	—	—	—	—	
Glee Love Songs	Released: February 11, 2021; Label: Columbia, Legacy; Format: Streaming	—	—	—	—	
Glee LGBTQIA+ Pride	Released: July 15, 2022; Label: Columbia, Legacy; Format: Streaming	—	—	—	—	
Glee Summer Hits	Released: August 19, 2022; Label: Columbia, Legacy; Format: Streaming	—	—	—	—	
Glee Christmas Songs	Released: November 11, 2022; Label: Columbia, Legacy; Format: Streaming	—	—	—	—	
Glee Season 1	Released: March 22, 2024; Label: Columbia, Legacy; Format: Streaming	—	—	—	—	
Glee Season 2	Released: March 22, 2024; Label: Columbia, Legacy; Format: Streaming	—	—	—	—	
Glee Season 3	Released: March 22, 2024; Label: Columbia, Legacy; Format: Streaming	—	—	—	—	
Glee Sad Songs	Released: March 22, 2024; Label: Columbia, Legacy; Format: Streaming	—	—	—	—	
Glee Party Playlist	Released: March 22, 2024; Label: Columbia, Legacy; Format: Streaming	—	—	—	—	
Glee Musical Hits	Released: March 22, 2024; Label: Columbia, Legacy; Format: Streaming	—	—	—	—	
Glee Happy Songs	Released: March 22, 2024; Label: Columbia, Legacy; Format: Streaming	—	—	—	—	
Glee Hits	Released: March 22, 2024; Label: Columbia, Legacy; Format: Streaming	—	—	—	—	
"—" denotes a release that did not chart.

=== EPs ===
List of EPs, with selected peak chart positions and certifications
Title	EP details	Peak chart positions									Certifications
Title	EP details	AUS	CAN	FRA	IRL	MEX	NL	UK	US	US Sound.	Certifications
Glee: The Music, The Power of Madonna	Released: April 20, 2010; Label: Columbia (#767681); Format: CD, download	10	1	—	5	34	93	4	1	1	BPI: Silver
Glee: The Music, Journey to Regionals	Released: June 8, 2010; Label: Columbia (#772878); Format: CD, download	3	2	184	1	59	—	2	1	1	BPI: Silver
Glee: The Music, The Rocky Horror Glee Show	Released: October 19, 2010; Label: Columbia (#779646); Format: CD, download	8	10	—	15	—	—	23	6	1	
Glee: The Music, Love Songs	Released: December 28, 2010; Label: Columbia; Format: CD	—	—	—	—	—	—	—	—	—	
Glee: The Music, Dance Party	Released: September 6, 2011; Label: Columbia; Format: CD	—	—	—	—	—	—	—	—	—	
Britney 2.0	Released: September 18, 2012; Label: Twentieth Century Fox Film Corporation; Format: Download	—	—	—	—	—	—	122	43	1	
Glee: The Music Presents Glease	Released: November 6, 2012; Label: Columbia; Format: CD, download	72	—	—	88	—	—	79	28	1	
Glee: The Quarterback	Released: October 15, 2013; Label: Columbia; Format: CD, download	—	5	—	28	—	—	64	7	1	
A Katy or a Gaga (Music from the Episode)	Released: November 5, 2013; Label: Columbia; Format: Download	—	—	—	—	—	—	—	43	1	
Movin' Out	Released: November 19, 2013; Label: Twentieth Century Fox Film Corporation, Columbia; Format: CD, download	—	—	—	—	—	—	—	107	5	
Glee: The Music, The Christmas Album Volume 4	Released: December 3, 2013; Label: Twentieth Century Fox Film Corporation, Columbia; Format: CD, download	—	—	—	—	—	—	—	104	9	
Glee: The Music, City of Angels	Released: March 11, 2014; Label: Twentieth Century Fox Film Corporation, Columbia; Format: Download	—	—	—	—	—	—	—	122	6	
Glee: The Music, New New York	Released: April 1, 2014; Label: Twentieth Century Fox Film Corporation, Columbia; Format: Download	—	—	—	—	—	—	—	123	4	
Glee: The Music, Bash	Released: April 8, 2014; Label: Twentieth Century Fox Film Corporation, Columbia; Format: Download	—	—	—	—	—	—	—	194	8	
Glee: The Music, Tested	Released: April 15, 2014; Label: Twentieth Century Fox Film Corporation, Columbia; Format: Download	—	—	—	—	—	—	—	—	14	
Glee: The Music, Opening Night	Released: April 22, 2014; Label: Twentieth Century Fox Film Corporation, Columbia; Format: Download	—	—	—	—	—	—	—	—	9	
Glee: The Music, the Back Up Plan	Released: April 29, 2014; Label: Twentieth Century Fox Film Corporation, Columbia; Format: Download	—	—	—	—	—	—	—	—	7	
Glee: The Music, Old Dog, New Tricks	Released: May 6, 2014; Label: Twentieth Century Fox Film Corporation, Columbia; Format: Download	—	—	—	—	—	—	—	—	14	
Glee: The Music, The Untitled Rachel Berry Project	Released: May 13, 2014; Label: Twentieth Century Fox Film Corporation, Columbia; Format: Download	—	—	—	—	—	—	—	—	8	
Glee: The Music, Loser Like Me	Released: January 6, 2015; Label: Twentieth Century Fox Film Corporation, Columbia; Format: Download	—	—	—	—	—	—	—	144	9	
Glee: The Music, Homecoming	Released: January 6, 2015; Label: Twentieth Century Fox Film Corporation, Columbia; Format: Download	—	—	—	—	—	—	—	119	8	
Glee: The Music, Jagged Little Tapestry	Released: January 13, 2015; Label: Twentieth Century Fox Film Corporation, Columbia; Format: Download	—	—	—	—	—	—	—	127	8	
Glee: The Music, The Hurt Locker	Released: January 20, 2015; Label: Twentieth Century Fox Film Corporation, Columbia; Format: Download	—	—	—	—	—	—	—	—	12	
Glee: The Music, The Hurt Locker, Pt. 2	Released: January 27, 2015; Label: Twentieth Century Fox Film Corporation, Columbia; Format: Download	—	—	—	—	—	—	—	—	7	
Glee: The Music, What the World Needs Now Is Love	Released: February 3, 2015; Label: Twentieth Century Fox Film Corporation, Columbia; Format: CD (only Japan), download	—	—	—	—	—	—	—	—	8	
Glee: The Music, Transitioning	Released: February 10, 2015; Label: Twentieth Century Fox Film Corporation, Columbia; Format: Download	—	—	—	—	—	—	—	—	12	
Glee: The Music, A Wedding	Released: February 17, 2015; Label: Twentieth Century Fox Film Corporation, Columbia; Format: Download	—	—	—	—	—	—	—	—	10	
Glee: The Music, Child Star	Released: February 24, 2015; Label: Twentieth Century Fox Film Corporation, Columbia; Format: Download	—	—	—	—	—	—	—	—	15	
Glee: The Music, the Rise and Fall of Sue Sylvester	Released: March 3, 2015; Label: Twentieth Century Fox Film Corporation, Columbia; Format: Download	—	—	—	—	—	—	—	—	18	
Glee: The Music, We Built This Glee Club	Released: March 10, 2015; Label: Twentieth Century Fox Film Corporation, Columbia; Format: Download	—	—	—	—	—	—	—	114	6	
Glee: The Music, 2009	Released: March 17, 2015; Label: Twentieth Century Fox Film Corporation, Columbia; Format: Download	—	—	—	—	—	—	—	—	14	
Glee: The Music, Dreams Come True	Released: March 17, 2015; Label: Twentieth Century Fox Film Corporation, Columbia; Format: Download	—	—	—	—	—	—	—	63	7	
"—" denotes a release that did not chart.

== See also ==
- Lists of songs in Glee
- List of Billboard Hot 100 chart achievements and milestones

== Notes ==
1. The instrumental arrangements of "Somebody to Love", "Keep Holding On", "Lean on Me", "True Colors", and "My Life Would Suck Without You" were also released as karaoke singles.
2. Three separate covers of "Defying Gravity" were released as singles: one by Lea Michele (Rachel), one by Chris Colfer (Kurt), and one with both. The version that charted features both.
3. "Last Christmas" was released as a charity single during the first season; the song had not then appeared on the series. During the second season, it was included on Glee: The Music, The Christmas Album and subsequently appeared in the episode "A Very Glee Christmas".
4. Jonathan Groff is featured on, though uncredited for, the cover of "Another One Bites the Dust".
5. This track also appears as the first track on the album Glee: The Music Presents the Warblers, which came out after Glee: The Music, Volume 4.
6. Two separate covers of "Don't Cry for Me Argentina" were released as singles: one by Michele (Rachel) and one by Colfer (Kurt). The version that charted features the former.
7. The single for "A Boy Like That" includes the song "I Have a Love", which is sung immediately after it in West Side Story. In the episode, the two songs were not performed consecutively.
