= Lists of songs in Glee (TV series) =

Songs performed in the American television series Glee are listed in the following articles:

- List of songs in Glee season 1
- List of songs in Glee season 2
- List of songs in Glee season 3
- List of songs in Glee season 4
- List of songs in Glee season 5
- List of songs in Glee season 6
