= Funeral (Glee) =

- Glee episode
- Episode no.: Season 2 Episode 21
- Directed by: Bradley Buecker
- Written by: Ryan Murphy
- Production code: 2ARC21
- Original air date: May 17, 2011

Guest appearances
- Jonathan Groff as Jesse St. James; Harry Shum, Jr. as Mike Chang; Chord Overstreet as Sam Evans; Ashley Fink as Lauren Zizes; Kent Avenido as Howard Bamboo; Kari Coleman as Donna Jackson; Jim Metzler as the reverend; Lauren Potter as Becky Jackson; Robin Trocki as Jean Sylvester

Episode chronology
← Previous "Prom Queen"	Next → "New York"
- Glee season 2

"Funeral" is the twenty-first episode of the second season of the American musical television series Glee, and the forty-third overall. It first aired May 17, 2011 on Fox in the United States, and was written by series creator Ryan Murphy and directed by Bradley Buecker. The episode featured Jonathan Groff guest starring as Jesse St. James, who is brought in as a consultant to help the New Directions glee club prepare for the National Show Choir competition. Finn (Cory Monteith) breaks up with Quinn (Dianna Agron). Sue Sylvester's (Jane Lynch) sister Jean (Robin Trocki) dies unexpectedly, and the glee club helps Sue plan her funeral.

The episode received a wide range of reviews, from highly enthusiastic to harshly critical, though Lynch's performance was widely praised. The performances of the five songs covered were generally well-liked, though having four of them arranged as a series of auditions in the middle of the show met with disapproval. All five songs were released as singles, and three of them charted on the Billboard Hot 100.

Upon its initial airing, this episode was viewed by 8.97 million American viewers and garnered a 3.6/10 Nielsen rating/share in the 18–49 demographic. The total viewership and ratings for this episode were down slightly from the previous episode, "Prom Queen". Lynch was nominated for an Outstanding Supporting Actress in a Comedy Series at the 63rd Primetime Emmy Awards for her work on the show, and submitted this episode for judging.

== Plot ==
Will Schuester (Matthew Morrison), director of New Directions, the McKinley High School glee club, hires Jesse St. James (Jonathan Groff)—an alumnus of championship-winning rival glee club Vocal Adrenaline—as a consultant to help them develop a strategy to win the upcoming Nationals competition. Jesse convinces Will to use Vocal Adrenaline's methodology, which is to identify the club's best performer and center the entire performance on that person, and Will decides to hold auditions to determine who will be featured. Santana Lopez (Naya Rivera), Rachel Berry (Lea Michele), Mercedes Jones (Amber Riley) and Kurt Hummel (Chris Colfer) all audition, with Jesse and Will as judges. Jesse is highly critical of the performances by Santana, Kurt and Mercedes, while he praises his former girlfriend Rachel's performance. He tells Will that Rachel is the clear winner, which angers the other three. Ultimately, Will decides to ignore Jesse's advice and instead plans to do for Nationals what brought them victory at the Regionals competition: having the whole group sing original songs.

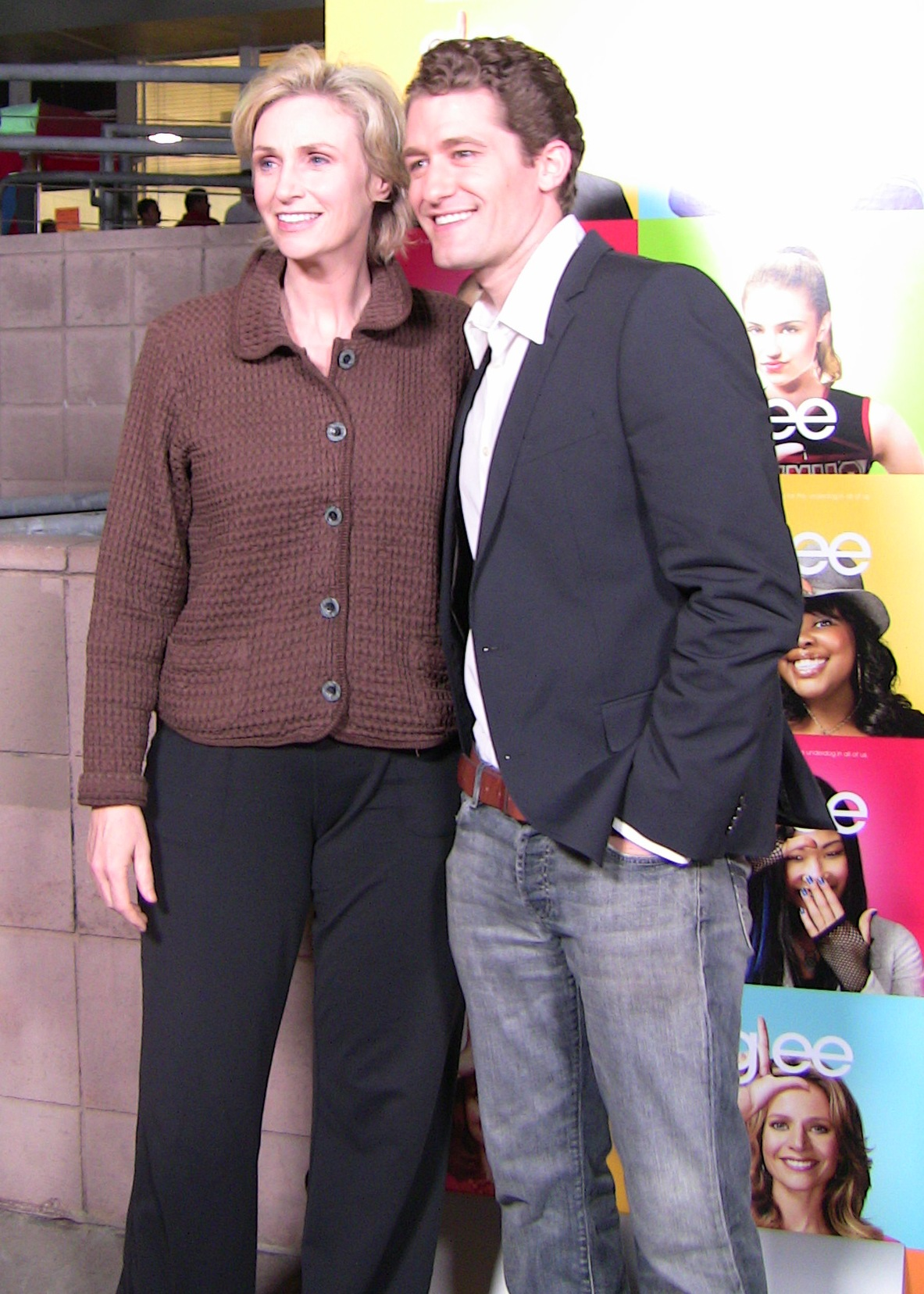
In this episode, Sue (Lynch, left) is thankful to Will (Morrison, right) for supporting her through her sister's funeral.

Cheerleading coach Sue Sylvester (Jane Lynch) is deeply upset by the death of her sister, Jean (Robin Trocki). She lashes out by having the glee club's flight to Nationals in New York City rerouted so it has a layover in war-ravaged Tripoli and kicks Becky Jackson (Lauren Potter) off the Cheerios. Sue allows Finn Hudson (Cory Monteith) and Kurt to plan Jean's funeral and help her sort through Jean's personal belongings, and agrees to have the glee club to perform at the funeral, as she believes no one will attend otherwise. While going through Jean's belongings, Finn and Kurt discover that her favorite movie was Willy Wonka & the Chocolate Factory, and arrange a funeral inspired by the film. At the funeral, an emotional Sue is unable to continue reading her eulogy after a few sentences, and Will reads the remainder for her. The glee club then sings "Pure Imagination", the theme song of the film. Touched by Will's support, Sue later tells him that he is a good friend and he has what Jean had and she does not: a pure heart. She says that she will no longer attempt to destroy the glee club, and announces that she is planning to run for the United States House of Representatives. For the first time, she wishes him good luck. Sue also apologizes to Becky, reinstates her as a member of the Cheerios, and tells her she will be captain of the squad in the fall. Sue asks for and receives a hug from Becky.

Finn realizes his true feelings for Rachel during the funeral, and breaks up with Quinn Fabray (Dianna Agron) afterward. He later thanks her for not quitting glee club because of their breakup; Quinn tells him that quitting would have ruined her "big plans" for New York, and refuses to tell him what they are. Finn sees Jesse and Rachel sharing a brief kiss on stage; after they leave, he brings a flower from behind his back. Will's ex-wife, Terri (Jessalyn Gilsig), who aided Sue's earlier plot to sabotage the glee club's flights, gives Will first-class plane tickets to New York for the entire club, revealing that they were a donation from an airline executive. She tells him she is moving to Miami to start over with her life and to pursue her retail management career, and they say goodbye.

== Production ==
The episode was written by series co-creator Ryan Murphy and directed by Bradley Buecker. Two months before it aired, Murphy confirmed at PaleyFest 2011 that there was a death planned before the end of the season, but that it would not be recurring character Dave Karofsky, despite rumors that his death would be paving the way for Kurt's return to McKinley High. Further details were eventually supplied by entertainment reporter Michael Ausiello, who reported on April 19, 2011, that a "beloved character" would be dying in the "season's penultimate episode", and one week later that the character was female. Morrison confirmed in late April that there would indeed be a death, and added: "The episode right before the finale is called 'Funeral'. We were actually at a funeral home yesterday, shooting all day. It was a very taxing day." The day the episode aired, Lynch revealed in an interview that Murphy had conferred with her before proceeding with the storyline: "He took me aside at a party and said 'I want your blessing on this before we move forward.' I said, 'It sounds like a really great storyline.' It’s the thing that will break Sue Sylvester’s heart and get to where she lives." Lynch was nominated for an Outstanding Supporting Actress in a Comedy Series at the 63rd Primetime Emmy Awards for her work on the show, and submitted "Funeral" to be the episode by which she would be judged.

Groff returns for the second of three consecutive episodes as Jesse. Terri's colleague Howard Bamboo (Kent Avenido) also returns, and makes his only appearance of the second season after having featured in several episodes during the first. Other recurring guest stars in the episode include glee club members Mike Chang (Harry Shum, Jr.), Sam Evans (Chord Overstreet) and Lauren Zizes (Ashley Fink), cheerleader Becky Jackson (Lauren Potter), and in an uncredited appearance in a video shown during the funeral scene, Sue's sister Jean Sylvester (Robin Trocki). Additional guests include Becky's mother Donna Jackson (Kari Coleman), and Jim Metzler as the Reverend who presides at the funeral.

"Funeral" features cover versions of five songs: "Back to Black" by Amy Winehouse, sung by Rivera; "Some People" from Gypsy, performed by Colfer; "Try a Little Tenderness" by Otis Redding, sung by Riley; "My Man" in the Barbra Streisand version from the film of Funny Girl, performed by Michele; and "Pure Imagination" from Willy Wonka & the Chocolate Factory, sung by New Directions.

== Reception ==
=== Ratings ===
"Funeral" was first broadcast on May 17, 2011, in the United States on Fox. It garnered a 3.6/10 Nielsen rating/share in the 18–49 demographic, and received 8.97 million American viewers during its initial airing, despite airing simultaneously with the NCIS season finale on CBS, The Biggest Loser on NBC, Dancing With the Stars Freestyle Special on ABC, and the One Tree Hill season finale on The CW. The total viewership and ratings for this episode were down slightly from those of the previous episode, "Prom Queen"—which was watched by 9.29 million American viewers and acquired a 3.7/11 rating/share in the 18–49 demographic upon first airing on television.

The episode's Canadian broadcast, also on May 17, 2011, drew 1.58 million viewers. It was the fourteenth most-watched show of the week, and ranked two places higher than the previous week's "Prom Queen", even though it drew 13% fewer viewers than the 1.82 million recorded for that episode. In Australia, the episode was watched by 1.07 million viewers on June 8, 2011, which made Glee the seventh most-watched show of the night and the twenty-first most-watched for the week. This was up slightly from "Prom Queen", which attracted 1.04 million viewers on June 1, 2011, and was the eighth most-watched program of the night and twenty-sixth of the week. In the UK, the episode debuted on June 7, 2011, and was watched by 2.19 million viewers (1.76 million on E4, and 427,000 on E4+1), which made it the most-watched show on E4 and E4+1 for the week, and the most-watched show on cable for the week. This was up slightly over "Prom Queen", which aired on May 23, 2011, and was watched by 2.11 million viewers, again the most-watched show on cable for the week.

=== Critical response ===
"Funeral" was met with a wide range of reviews, from highly enthusiastic to harshly critical. Lisa Respers France of CNN said it was "one of the best episodes ever", and MTV's Aly Semigran called it "authentic" and "one of the very best" of the season if not the series as a whole. Robert Canning of IGN wrote that it was "a great episode that truly showcased the talents of Jane Lynch" and rated it 8.5 out of 10. Rolling Stone's Erica Futterman said that the episode "felt like a recycled version of things we've seen previously" and added that the show is "not as entertaining when it's simply a showcase". Emily VanDerWerff of The A.V. Club gave the episode a "C" and characterized the funeral scene as "the highlight of an uneven episode". The Atlantic's Kevin Fallon wrote, "Killing off Sue's sister seemed cruel, but ultimately paid off—it's too bad the episode completely derailed afterward, dying its own rapid death in turn." Anthony Benigno of The Faster Times had little good to say, and singled out the writers for doing "such a crappy job" on the penultimate episode of the season.

Lynch as Sue received high praise for her acting. Canning wrote that she "stole the episode" and "perfectly portrayed a woman [whose] hard heart was trying terribly not to break, but not being able to stop it." BuddyTV's John Kubicek stated, "it's impossible for me to say that Lynch wasn't exceptional, because her slow breakdown and attempt to cover-up her emotions was well done and fit perfectly with the character." Respers France commented that "we got to see the range and complexity of Sue Sylvester", and Sandra Gonzalez of Entertainment Weekly said that Lynch did an "outstanding job of delivering even the funniest quips with an underlying sense of sadness". Sue's characterization in the series was criticized by several reviewers, however. Amy Reiter of The Los Angeles Times stated that the "consistent inconsistency of Sue's character is wearing thin", and that "our sense of her fails to advance, wandering endlessly between pure evil and pure love for her sister." Futterman called the episode a "too-little-too late attempt at redemption for Sue's poor characterization this season." VanDerWerff wrote that the episode "feels very self-consciously like a way to just remove her character from the table for the season finale", that "it feels very self-consciously like an attempt by the show to address the fact that the character doesn't make any sense", and criticized the death of Jean: "killing her solely to right a wayward character arc is lazy writing, and no amount of actor commitment can wholly save it." Fallon described the funeral plot line as "pure, classic Glee: Egregiously random, emotionally manipulative, wholly unnecessary to plot development, and, in the end, deeply moving."

The secondary plot line, about the auditions for New Directions soloist at Nationals, was roundly criticized. Canning called it a "faux drama", though he added that Jesse was "a delight to despise", and VanDerWerff said it was "completely ridiculous to do this with Nationals coming up" in a week's time, and "constructed almost entirely" to make Jesse a "jerk". Houston Chronicle's Bobby Hankinson also hit on the lack of preparation for the upcoming competition and stated that it seemed "like a very bad idea" to be going without a setlist already decided on, much less with songs unwritten. He said the four audition numbers were "awkwardly paced", though he thought they were "fantastic"; Reiter said they "stood out like glinting gems in a somewhat muddy episode". Canning and VanDerWerff also criticized the block of four songs in the middle of the episode which, as VanDerWerff put it, "stops the show cold". James Poniewozik of Time was unhappy for another reason altogether: "Having four people stand up and sing solos into a microphone may be music; but it ain't a musical."

Poniewozik wrote of Will's Broadway plans that "his ambitions, and guilt over them, make a much more believable and compelling conflict than Matthew Morrison has had to convey for much of the season." VanDerWerff complimented Morrison on his portrayal of Will: "every time the show hands him anything to play that's something that makes vague sense, he does a good job with it." Other kudos for the actors were provided by Respers France, who highlighted the "further great acting" seen during "Finn and Quinn's moment in his truck", and E! Online's Jenna Mullins, who called the scene where Finn and Kurt help Sue with her sister's room "positively heartbreaking", and the trio of characters "magnificent". Although Canning stated that "Terri leaving lacked much punch", Poniewozik commented that it was "satisfying to see her realized as an adult for once".

=== Musical commentary ===
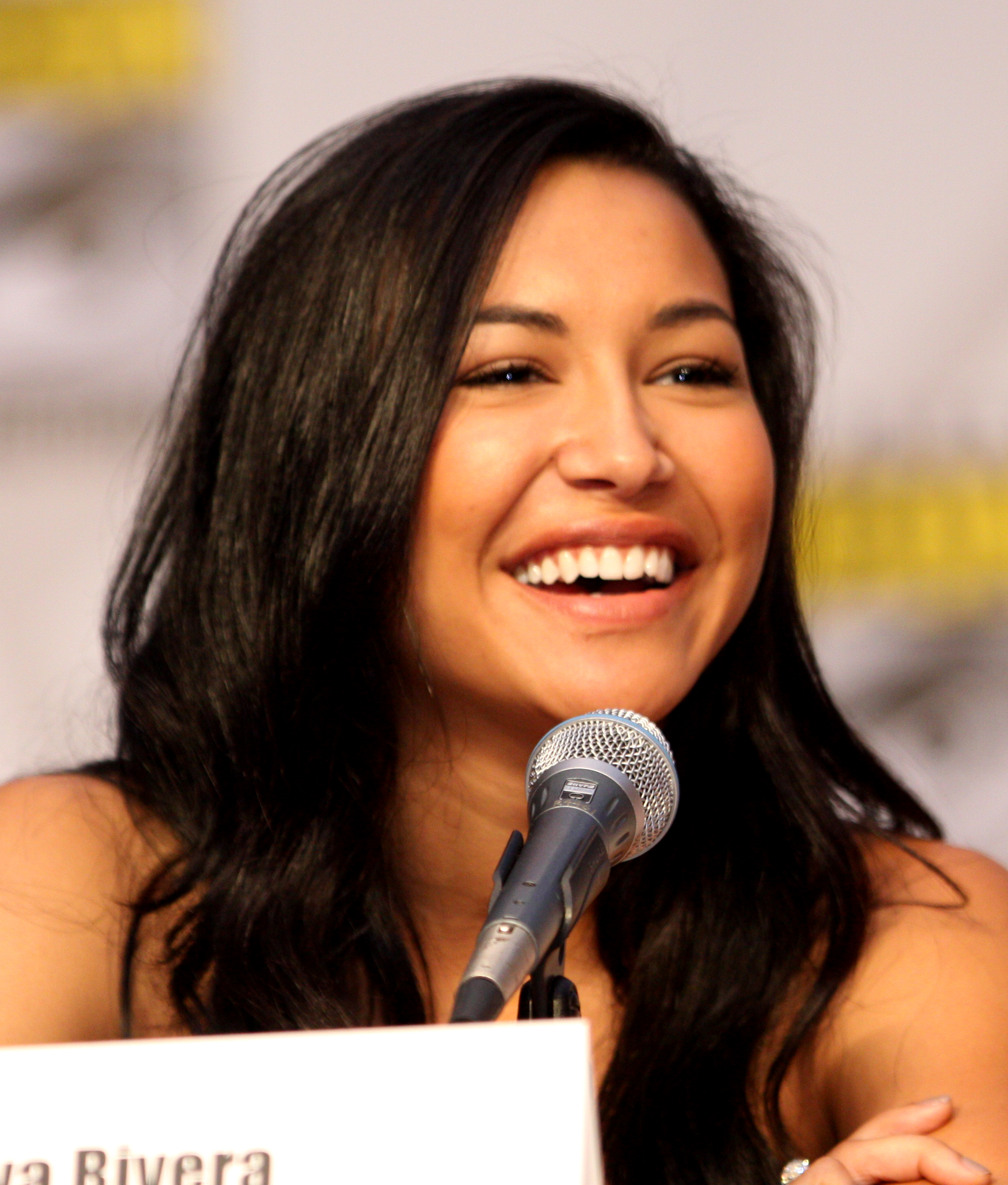
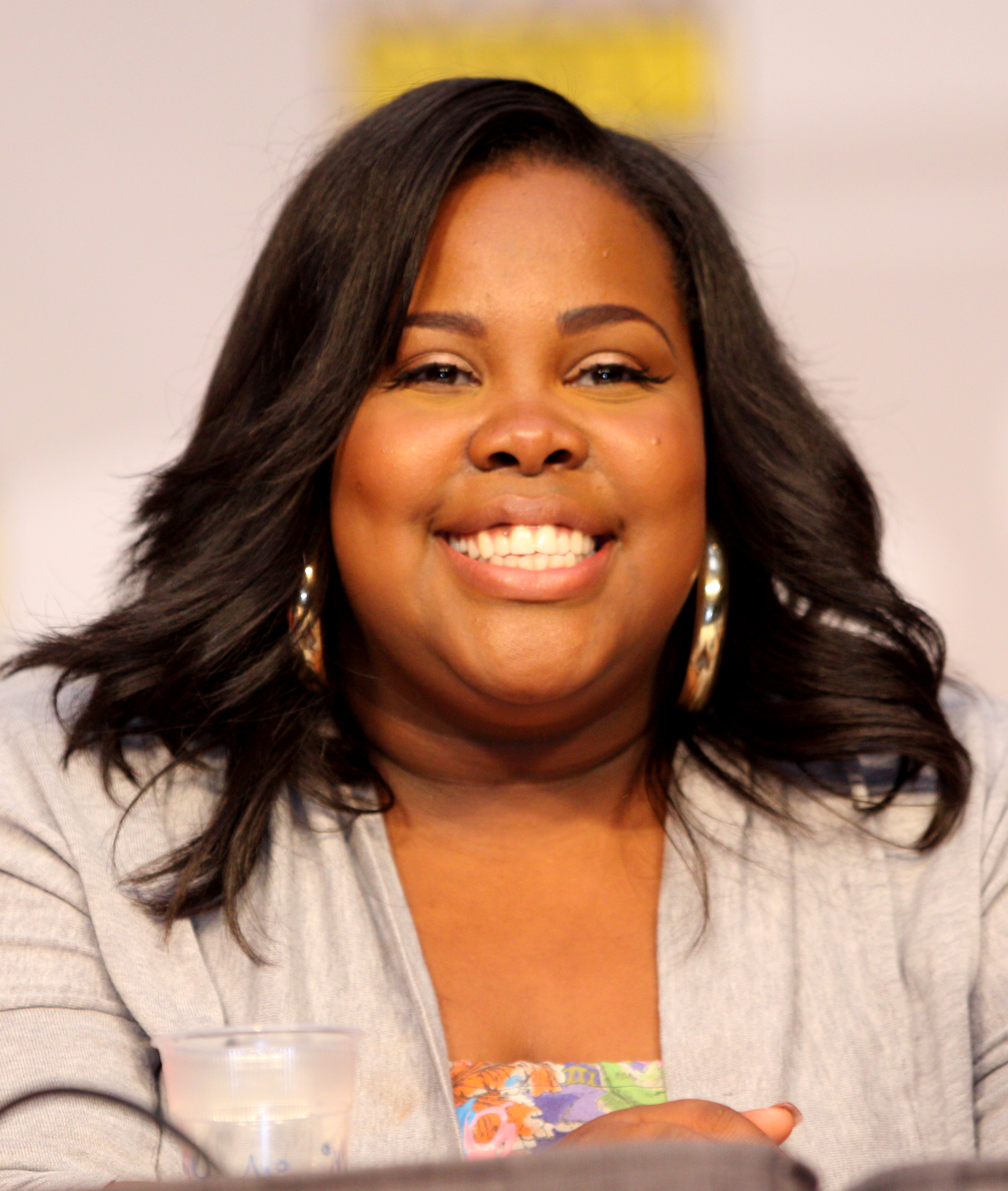
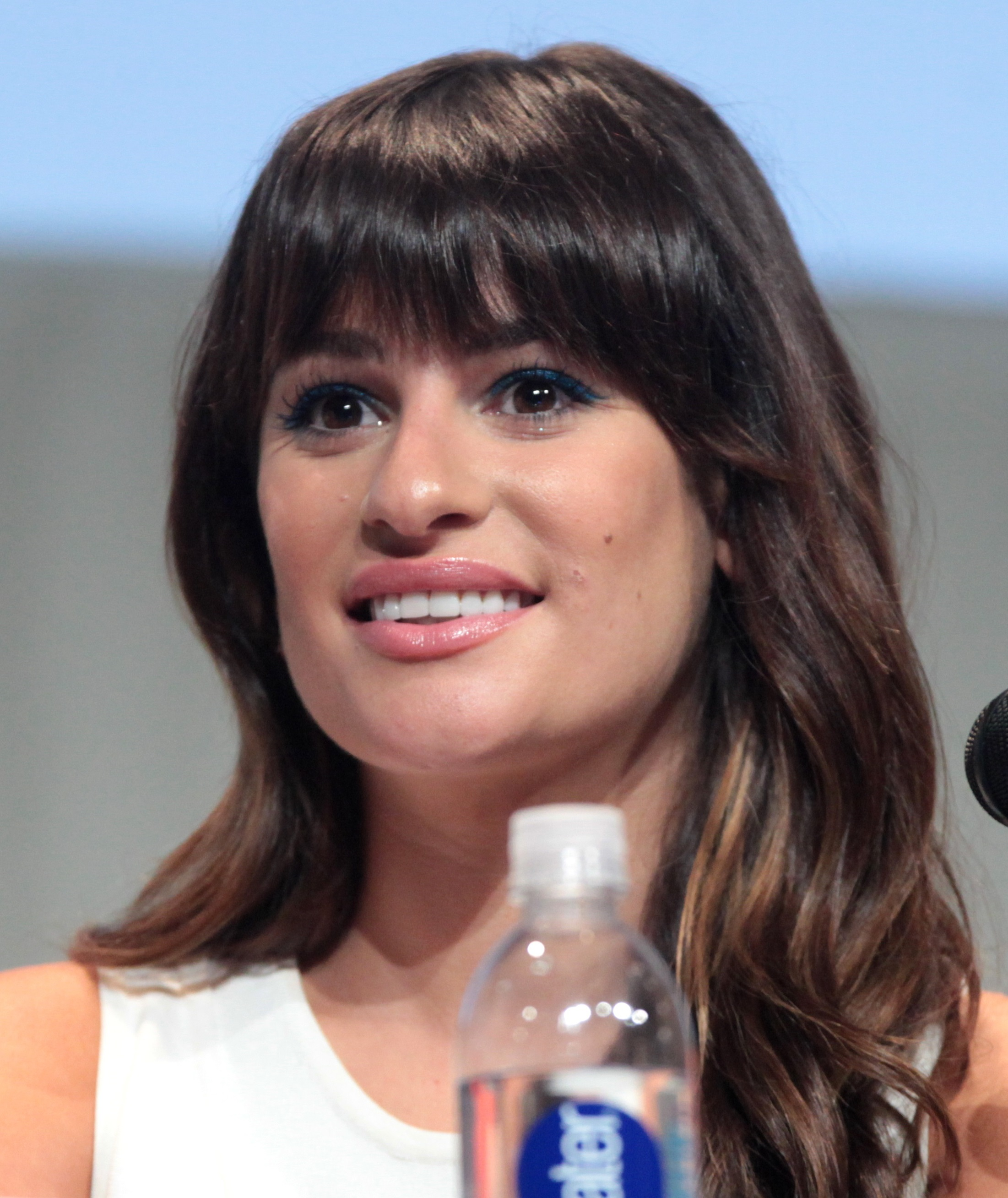
Solo performances in "Funeral" by Naya Rivera (left), Amber Riley (center) and Lea Michele (right) all received high marks.

While the placement of the four solos together in the middle of the episode was questioned, the songs themselves were met with approbation: VanDerWerff called all four "really good performances". Santana's rendition of "Back to Black" was declared "spot on" by Futterman, and Raymund Flandez of The Wall Street Journal wrote that it was performed "with raspy sensitivity", and went "deep into the emotional truth of the song". Kubicek was less enthusiastic, and called it "pretty good, but nothing groundbreaking or special", and Semigran called it "decent". Benigno said that "Rivera's delivery gives this song its smoldering swagger" and gave it an "A−", and Poniewozik praised Rivera as "really impressive".

"Some People" received adequate to good reviews. Gonzalez missed Kurt's usual charisma and thought the performance "a bit lackluster", and Benigno called it "kind of a boring cover". It received their lowest grades of the show, "B" and "B−", respectively. Kubicek stated, "Kurt has a unique voice that sounds positively beautiful with the right melodic song, but this is a terrible song for his style", and Vanity Fair's Brett Berk added, after he gave it two out of five stars, that it was "not the best showcase of Kurt's talents". Futterman and Reiter referred approvingly to Kurt's "upper register", and both Reiter and Respers France said he "ripped it" on his song.

"Try a Little Tenderness" received a stream of bouquets from the critics. Kubicek raved that Mercedes "gave 100% of what she has to offer, which is pure greatness", and Respers France said she "stole the night" and was "amazing". Berk broke his own scale of one to five stars with six stars, and praised "the unstinting instrument that is Mercedes' voice". Gonzalez gave it an "A" and called it "pure perfection", but Benigno was more restrained with a "B+", and wrote "she hits a little too hard for my taste" and "the vocals … threaten to engulf the song itself".

"My Man" was also lauded. Flandez called it "heartstopping", and Futterman summed up with, "she nails the Funny Girl closer, making it one of Rachel's top performances on the show". Berk called it "good singing" and gave it three stars out of five, and Gonzalez gave it an "A−". Benigno was more generous with an "A" grade, and said, "even by Lea Michele's standards, the vocals here are fan-fucking-tastic". Hankinson agreed: "Rachel truly nailed the most difficult song she's ever sung."

The one group number, "Pure Imagination", received reviews that touched on the song itself as much as the performance. Fallon called it "unsettling yet touching" and Poniewozik described it as "odd but perfect". Berk, on the other hand, characterized it as "pure dreck". Benigno felt that while the song was "really quite good", the "stupidity of the scene" it was in detracted from it, resulting in a grade of "B+", while Gonzalez, when she gave it an "A−", said she hadn't been a "huge fan of the cover" when she heard it before the show aired, but it grew on her in context. Futterman wrote, "The New Directions break into a restrained, tender take on "Pure Imagination" with lush harmonies on the chorus that's exactly right for the moment."

=== Chart history ===
Only three of the five cover versions debuted on the Billboard Hot 100: "Pure Imagination" debuted at number fifty-nine, "Back to Black" at number eighty-two, and "My Man" at number ninety-four. "Pure Imagination" was the only song to make the Billboard Canadian Hot 100 at number eighty-seven.

Of the five songs that were featured in the episode, three were featured on the eighth soundtrack album of the series, Glee: The Music, Volume 6: "Pure Imagination", "My Man", and "Try a Little Tenderness". The album was released on May 23, 2011, and debuted at number four on the US Billboard 200, selling 80,000 copies in its first week, which was the second-lowest opening sales figure for a Glee release next to the extended play Glee: The Music, The Rocky Horror Glee Show, and lower than the 86,000 sold by Glee: The Music Presents the Warblers in its first week the previous month. The album was also at number four on the Canadian Album charts.
