= New York (Glee) =

- Glee episode
- Episode no.: Season 2 Episode 22
- Directed by: Brad Falchuk
- Written by: Brad Falchuk
- Production code: 2ARC22
- Original air date: May 24, 2011

Guest appearances
- Jonathan Groff as Jesse St. James; Cheyenne Jackson as Dustin Goolsby; Jake Zyrus (Note: Credited as Charice.) as Sunshine Corazon; Mike Starr as the Broadway guy; Harry Shum, Jr. as Mike Chang; Chord Overstreet as Sam Evans; Darren Criss as Blaine Anderson; Ashley Fink as Lauren Zizes; Patti LuPone as herself

Episode chronology
← Previous "Funeral"	Next → "The Purple Piano Project"
- Glee season 2

"New York" is the twenty-second episode and season finale of the second season of the American musical television series Glee, and the forty-fourth overall. The episode was written and directed by series creator Brad Falchuk, filmed in part on location in New York City, and first aired on May 24, 2011 on Fox in the United States. With a $6 million budget, it was reportedly the most expensive episode of Glee at the time of broadcast. It garnered a Primetime Emmy nomination for Outstanding Costumes for a Series. The episode features an appearance by Patti LuPone as herself and guest stars Jonathan Groff, Cheyenne Jackson, and Jake Zyrus. The McKinley High School glee club, New Directions, performs at the National show choir competition in New York City and finishes in twelfth place. While they are there, the glee club members see the sights, including Times Square and Central Park. Rachel (Lea Michele) and Kurt (Chris Colfer) sing a song from a Broadway stage, as does their director, Will Schuester (Matthew Morrison).

The episode, and the musical performances featured, received mixed reviews from critics. While a number of scenes were praised, including the epilogue after the club's return to Lima, Ohio, reviewers excoriated the fact that New Directions arrived in New York with their songs for the competition unwritten, and deemed it completely illogical. The original songs in the competition were met with a wide range of opinions, as were most of the covers. Five original songs and five covers were performed, all but one of which were released as singles; three of the originals and two of the covers charted on the Billboard Hot 100. Upon its initial airing, this episode was viewed by 11.80 million American viewers and garnered a 4.6/11 Nielsen rating/share in the 18–49 demographic. The total viewership and ratings for this episode were up significantly from the previous episode, "Funeral".

== Plot ==
The McKinley High School glee club, New Directions, travels to New York City to compete in the National show choir competition. Glee club director Will Schuester (Matthew Morrison) tasks the students with writing two original songs, then leaves on an errand. After spending hours trying to compose music, their only creation is "My Cup" by Brittany (Heather Morris), Artie (Kevin McHale), and Puck (Mark Salling). Seeking fresh inspiration for their songwriting, they explore the city as they sing a mash-up of "I Love New York" and "New York, New York".

Meanwhile, Will has been visiting the theater where CrossRhodes, the April Rhodes musical in which he is secretly involved, is located. He performs "Still Got Tonight" from the stage. When Will returns, he finds that the glee club has been shaken after learning of his Broadway plans from Dustin Goolsby (Cheyenne Jackson), the coach of rival club Vocal Adrenaline. He reassures them that he has now fulfilled his dream of singing on a Broadway stage and chooses to stay with New Directions.

Encouraged by his fellow male glee club members, Finn (Cory Monteith) asks Rachel on a date in Central Park. The two enjoy dinner at Sardi's where they meet Patti LuPone. As the date draws to a close with Puck, Artie, Sam (Chord Overstreet), and Mike (Harry Shum, Jr.) serenading the two with "Bella Notte", Rachel feels torn between Finn and her dreams of being on Broadway, and leaves after refusing to kiss him. The next morning, after breakfast at Tiffany's, Rachel and Kurt (Chris Colfer) sneak onto the stage of Wicked and sing a duet of "For Good". Rachel realizes that her true love is Broadway and they vow to return to New York City for college.

In a hotel room, Quinn Fabray (Dianna Agron) hogs the bathroom in anger over Finn dumping her due to his true feelings for Rachel, while Santana Lopez (Naya Rivera), and Brittany S Peirce (Heather Morris) need their makeup done. Brittany gives Quinn an idea to get a tattoo of Ryan Seacrest.

At Nationals, Rachel encounters a nervous Sunshine Corazon (Jake Zyrus). She apologizes for having made Sunshine feel unwelcome at McKinley, and admits that she was jealous of her talent. She offers Sunshine her support, and reassures her as she opens for Vocal Adrenaline with "As Long As You're There".

The New Directions set begins with Rachel and Finn singing the duet he wrote, "Pretending", and an enthusiastic audience falls silent when the two of them kiss at its conclusion. The glee club closes with "Light Up the World" and receives a standing ovation. A jealous Jesse St. James (Jonathan Groff) confronts Finn after the performance, and asserts that the unprofessional kiss will cost them the championship. New Directions is not one of the ten groups named to advance to the finals the next day, and finishes in twelfth place out of fifty competing show choirs.

Back in Ohio, Kurt recounts his experiences in New York City to Blaine (Darren Criss), and they profess their love to each other. It is revealed that Sam and Mercedes (Amber Riley) are secretly dating. Santana (Naya Rivera) and Brittany reaffirm their friendship, and Brittany tells Santana she loves her more than she has ever loved anyone. Rachel meets up with Finn and the two contemplate their Nationals kiss; Finn reminds her that she still has a year until graduation and kisses her.

== Production ==
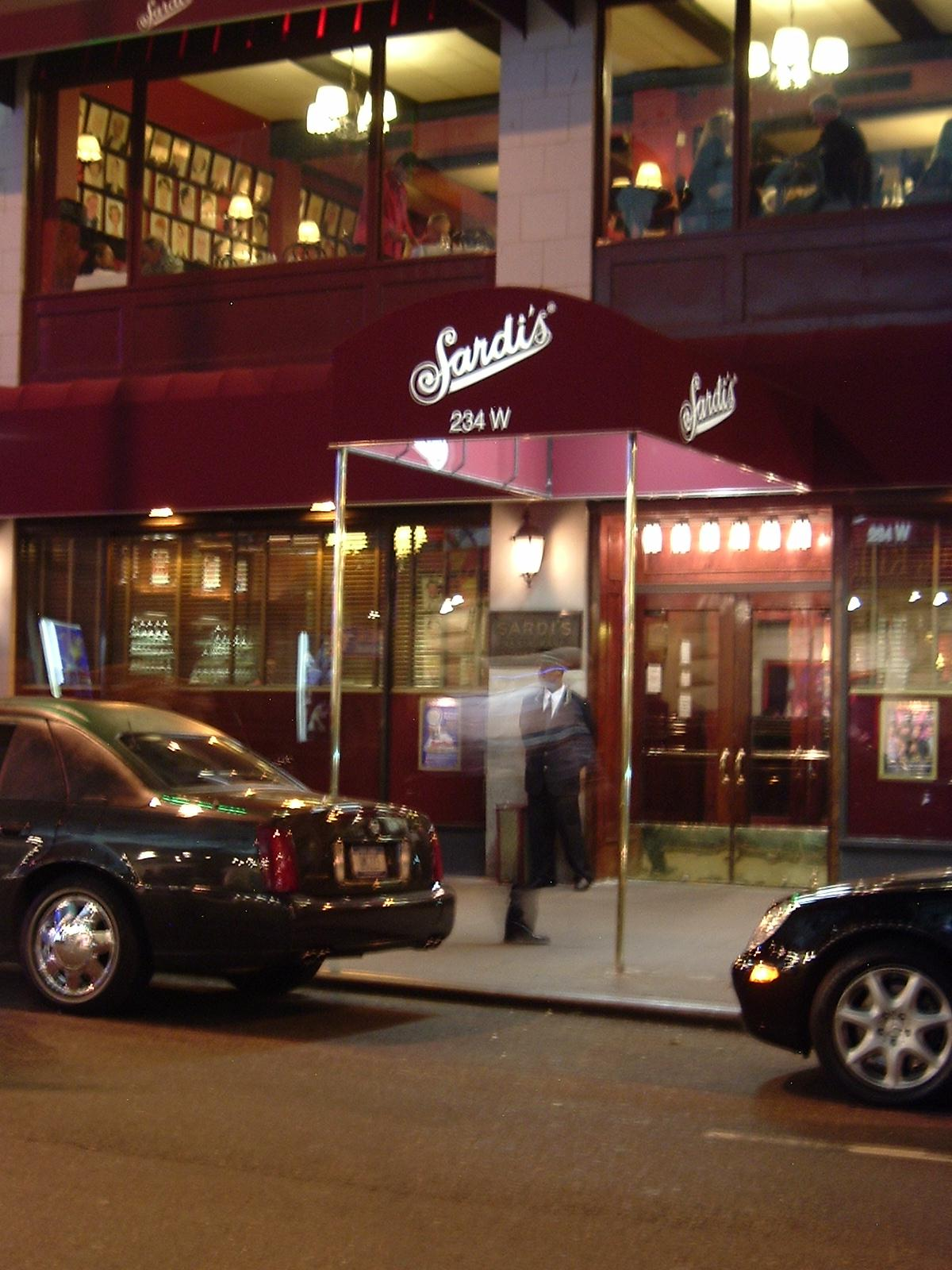
Filming for the episode took place in several locations in New York City, including Sardi's.

This was the most expensive Glee episode yet, at a reported $6 million. The budget exceeded the previous record-holder, "The Sue Sylvester Shuffle", which was the episode that followed the 2011 Super Bowl. It was also the show's first major out-of-state location shoot. The cast and crew filmed for five weekdays in New York City, from April 25 through April 29, 2011. Forty members of the crew were flown to New York along with the cast, and were joined there by sixty local crew members. All three of the show's creators—who also serve as executive or co-executive producers—were present: Ryan Murphy, Ian Brennan and episode writer and director Brad Falchuk, along with executive producer Dante Di Loreto and first assistant director Leo Bauer.

Ten locations were used during the New York filming, including Times Square, Lincoln Center, the Gershwin Theatre, Central Park, and Sardi's. LuPone made a guest appearance as herself in the Sardi's scene, which was shot in the morning on Thursday to accommodate her schedule—she had an 11:00 am rehearsal for another show. Washington Square Park, which was used on the final day of filming, had not been approved as a location by the city until after the production team arrived in New York. Di Loreto noted that the biggest challenge of shooting in the city was "the amount of people who can say no."

While some of the costumes for the New York shoot were prepared ahead of time, much of the costuming was done in New York, and the costumes for the episode received an Emmy Award nomination. Costume designer Lou Eyrich revealed that the plan was to have the costuming be a "little nod" to the "iconic New York places we were going to shoot", and with a "little bit of '50s, '60s flair", but not too "vintage". She said, "We landed in New York on a Saturday night, shopped all day Sunday, threw them in the clothes" for the filming that began on Monday. According to an article in The Hollywood Reporter, twenty-six outfits were found in a single day.

Filming continued back in Los Angeles, where episodes are typically shot, including a location shoot at the Million Dollar Theater to film Morrison's scene where he sings "Still Got Tonight" on a Broadway stage. The shooting for the episode—and the season—wrapped up in the early hours of May 12, 2011.

Recurring guest star Groff appeared in this episode as Jesse, as did Jackson as Vocal Adrenaline coach Dustin Goolsby and Zyrus as his star vocalist Sunshine. Other recurring characters included glee club members Mike Chang, Sam Evans and Lauren Zizes (Ashley Fink), and Kurt's boyfriend Blaine Anderson.

The episode featured five original songs and five musical cover versions. Of the original songs, Morris and McHale performed "My Cup", Morrison sang "Still Got Tonight", a track from his solo album, Zyrus performed "As Long As You're There", Michele and Monteith sang "Pretending", and New Directions performed "Light Up the World", with solo vocals by Rivera, Morris, McHale and Monteith, and a short duet with McHale and Jenna Ushkowitz. The cover versions included a brief performance of Frank Sinatra's "Theme from New York, New York", a mash-up of Madonna's "I Love New York" and "New York, New York" from On the Town, "Bella Notte" from Lady and the Tramp, Michele and Colfer on "For Good" from Wicked, and Usher's "Yeah!". All but the Sinatra number were released as singles, available for digital download, though "Still Got Tonight" had been released in late April in the lead-up to the debut of Morrison's album on May 10, 2011.

== Reception ==
=== Ratings ===
"New York" was first broadcast on May 24, 2011 in the United States on Fox. It garnered a 4.6/11 Nielsen rating/share in the 18–49 demographic, and received 11.80 million American viewers during its initial airing. With an American Idol lead-in, and despite strong competition from the first hour of Dancing With the Stars Results on ABC, which matched the Glee Nielsen rating/share for its two-hour broadcast, the total viewership and ratings for this episode were up by a third from those of the previous episode, "Funeral", which was watched by 8.97 million American viewers and acquired a 3.6/10 rating/share in the 18–49 demographic upon first airing. The episode was the top scripted show of the week among all viewers.

The episode's Canadian broadcast, also on May 24, 2011, drew 1.77 million viewers. It was the seventh most-watched show of the week, and ranked twice as high as "Funeral", which was watched by 1.58 million viewers. In the UK, the episode aired on June 13, 2011, and was watched by 2.61 million viewers (2.03 million on E4, and 573,000 on E4+1). It was the most watched show on cable for the week, and again increased viewership on "Funeral", which was watched by 2.19 million viewers. In Australia, "New York" aired on June 15, 2011, and was watched by 987,000 viewers, which made Glee the tenth most-watched show of the night. Viewership here declined from "Funeral", which was watched by 1.07 million and ranked seventh.

=== Critical response ===
"New York" was met with mixed reviews by many critics. Erica Futterman of Rolling Stone wrote, "We didn't actually expect the New Directions to win nationals, but the episode just felt like it was going through the motions rather than seizing the opportunity to do something truly spectacular." The A.V. Club's Emily VanDerWerff called the episode a "good piece of television", and gave it a "B+". She said it "wasn't as good" as the first-season finale, "Journey to Regionals", "largely because it wasted a lot of time on performances designed solely to show off how the show was actually in New York and also because it borrowed a lot of that episode's set pieces without finding anything remotely as powerful as the performance of 'Bohemian Rhapsody'". Robert Canning of IGN gave "New York" a "good" grade of 7.5 out of 10 and stated, "while not as epic as Nationals in New York should have been, 'New York' was a decent close to an enjoyable season." The Atlantic's Meghan Brown said the episode was "an uneven end to an uneven season, with a few killer numbers, strange resolutions, and head-scratching plot devices", while her colleague Kevin Fallon opined that the season finale was "no exception" to Glee having "been undeniably frustrating in season two", though "there was still ample reason to tune in and enjoy".

Several elements of the episode were highlighted for their implausibility. The arrival of New Directions in New York without having their songs already prepared received widespread condemnation, including from VanDerWerff and the Houston Chronicle's Bobby Hankinson, and led Brown to write, "there is absolutely no universe in which that makes sense. At all. It was so logically unsound that it was distracting." The notion that Rachel would not know that Cats had closed eleven years before was derided by Brown and Amy Reiter of the Los Angeles Times, while Rachel and Kurt's encounter with "the only friendly security guard in New York City" was mocked by Anthony Benigno of The Faster Times and Entertainment Weekly's Sandra Gonzalez. Several critics were disappointed that Quinn's ominous mention of plans for New York in "Funeral" came to nothing, including Benigno, who called her actual idea a "cockamamie sabotage plot", though he credited Agron's scene as a "great, wasted job in a great, wasted character", sentiments echoed by VanDerWerff and James Poniewozik of Time. Terron R. Moore of Ology.com gave the episode a "C+", and likened Quinn's dropped plot to Will leaving for Broadway and Rachel disowning her love for Finn: "the fact that none of this happened—and the fact that we know none of it would ever happen—is just another issue I have with the show. I hope that next season, it actually grows a pair."

Finn and Rachel's date in New York was praised, though not everyone was happy with its ending. Gonzalez liked LuPone's short guest spot, and hoped it would be "a lesson to producers in how to deal with guest appearances in the future". Canning said the date had a "sweet comical tone", and thought the episode was "the best the series has done so far with this couple". Reiter felt Rachel was making a "false" choice in her refusal of Finn at the end of the date, and wondered "couldn't she at least have asked him" if he would consider coming to New York. At the competition performance, Poniewozik said of the end of "Pretending", "I may not be that invested in Finn/Rachel, but the startling moment where the audience disappeared in the middle of their kiss made me feel like I was." Benigno called the moment "awesome", and VanDerWerff was also pleased.

Those reviewers who singled out the show's final segment, set after the return to Ohio, did so with compliments. Poniewozik wrote that the episode "did a really fine job handling its epilogue, in which New Directions had their hopes crushed, went back to Lima—and found that it was a pretty awesome experience regardless. Brittany connected with Santana, a brief scene that reminded me how far both characters have come this season. Kurt didn't get a championship, but he has Blaine, and he has a taste of what life can be like for him after graduation." Canning said it was a "nice denouement, putting everyone at peace for having failed to reach the top ten at Nationals and getting their hopes high for next year." Hankinson credited Brittany with some of the funniest lines in the episode as well as the most important scene—in the epilogue with Santana—and he was impressed with her lead vocals throughout. He concluded, "She's the M.V.P. of the night and possibly the season."

=== Music and performances ===
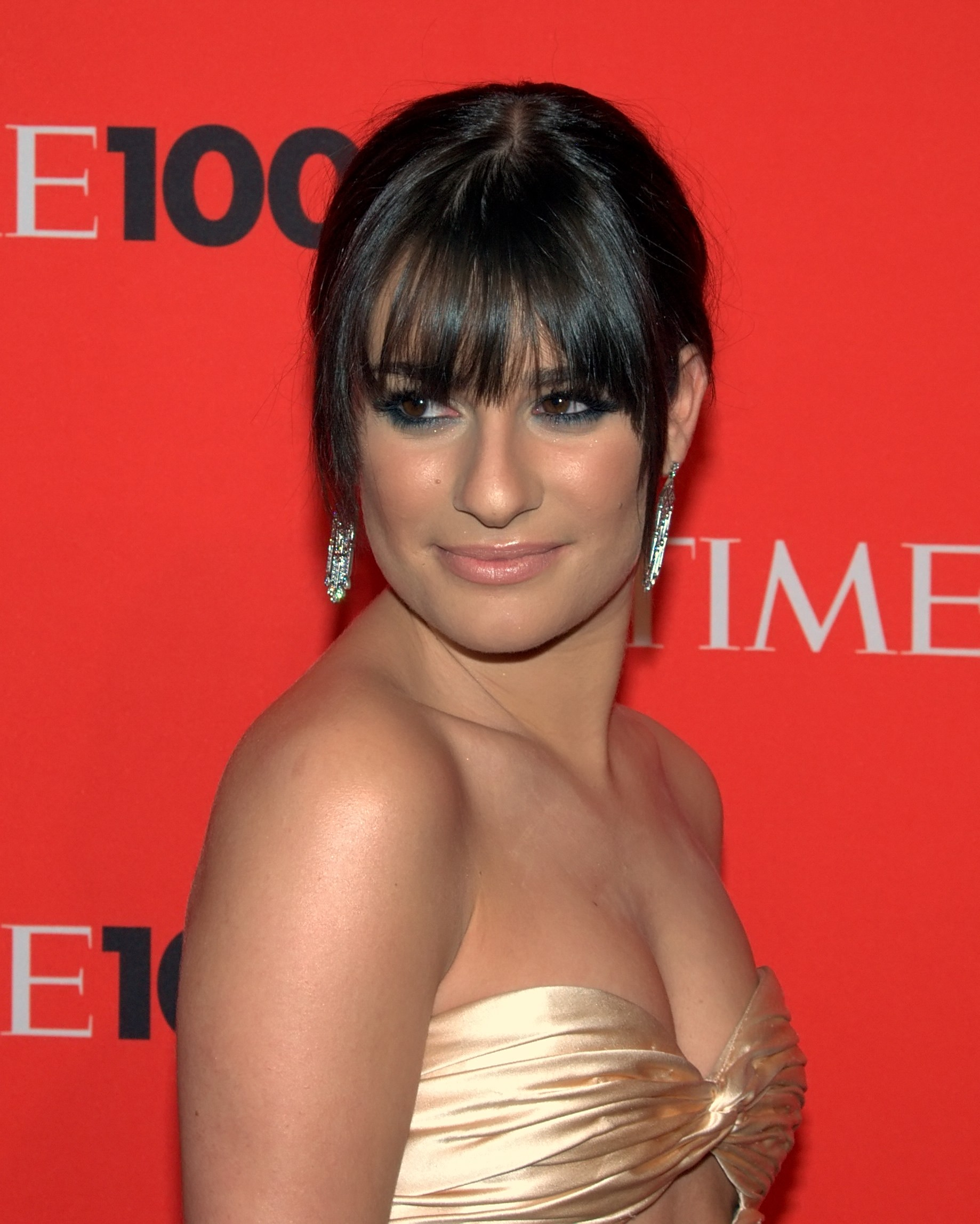
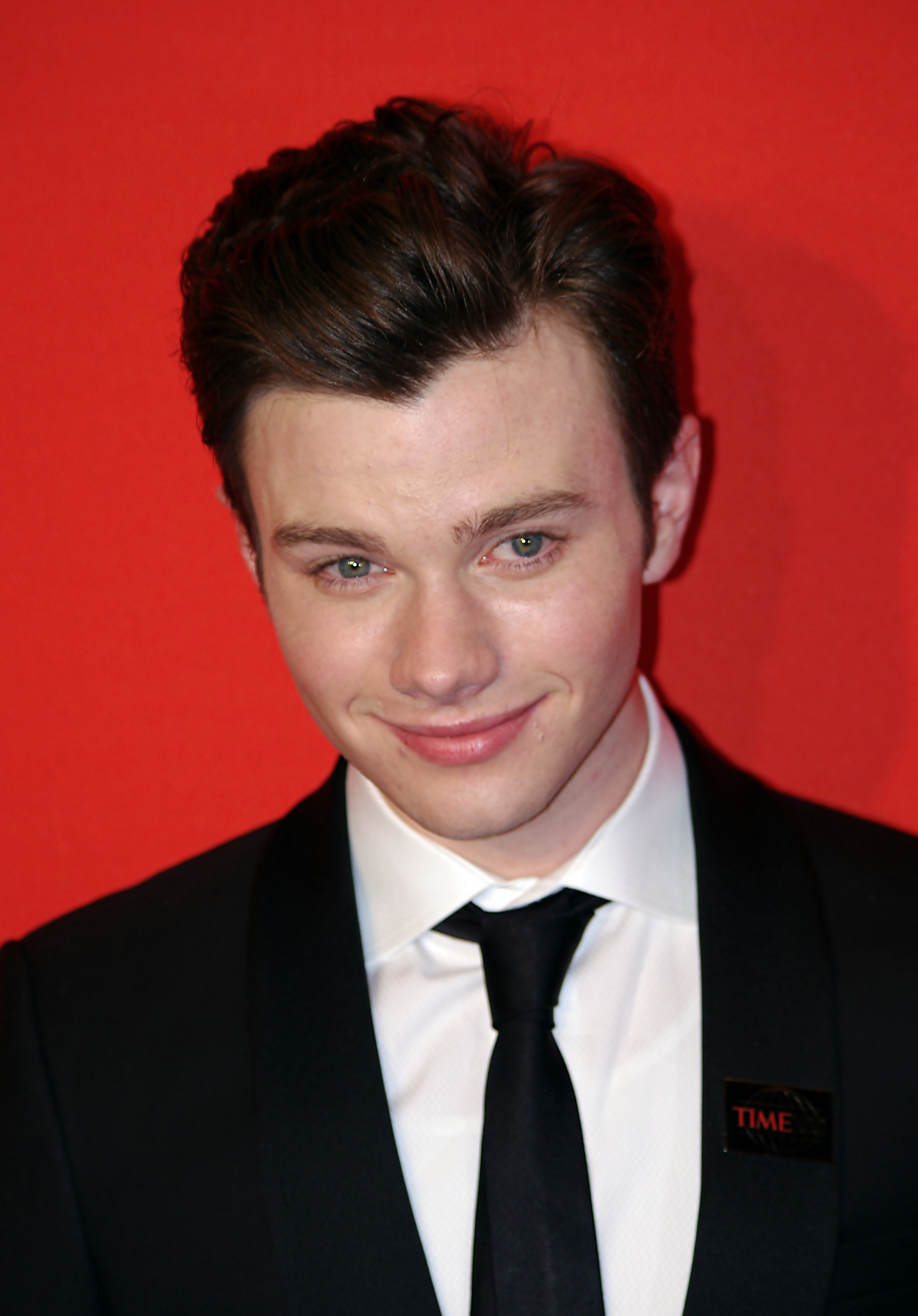
The duet of "For Good" between Rachel (Michele, left) and Kurt (Colfer, right) in this episode received critical praise, though its occurrence on the stage of the Gershwin Theatre was deemed highly implausible.

The musical performances received a mixed reaction from critics, both as a whole and individually. Poniewozik said the songs "mostly felt like padding, without anything that offered a strong connection of contrast with the story." VanDerWerff called the music her least favorite element of the episode, and was only complimentary about "Bella Notte". Brittany's original song, "My Cup", was called "light and fun" by Benigno. Kubicek characterized it as "another brilliantly absurd original song", and Canning said it was a "hilarious performance". While Brett Berk of Vanity Fair stated that it was "amazingly horrible", he nevertheless gave it three stars out of five.

The mash-up of "I Love New York" and "New York, New York" was typical of the range of reactions songs received. Benigno gave it a "C" and wondered whether it was bad that he "thought this was a joke song before [he] realized it was a mash-up". Gonzalez gave it a "B" and said it was "not [her] favorite". Futterman called it an "infectious, high-speed mash-up" and Hankinson listed it as one of the four favorite songs from the episode, though Kubicek said the on-screen performance "would make any real New Yorker want to kick [New Directions] in the shins".

Most reviewers were highly critical of the inclusion of Morrison's "Still Got Tonight", the second single from his solo album. VanDerWerff called it "way too self-indulgent" and Kubicek characterized it as "shameless self promotion". Gonzalez said the song "isn't half bad" and gave it a "B−", while Benigno was more generous with a "B+", despite his belief that it did not belong in the episode. Futterman called it "a generic-sounding pop melody". The use of "Bella Notte", by contrast, was generally approved of, though Kubicek thought it was "kind of weird that they weren't really there", and Berk gave both of its two stars out of five solely due to the "spectral singers". VanDerWerff thought the song was "well-performed", and Benigno gave it a "B+"; she had a very different take from Kubicek, as he found the imaginary appearance by the male club members hilarious.

Although Kurt and Rachel being allowed on the stage of a Broadway theater was deemed improbable in the extreme by many critics, most were willing to suspend disbelief and enjoy their duet of "For Good". Futterman wrote that the performance brought events "full circle from their season one drama around singing 'Defying Gravity'. It's a fitting song for friendship and Kurt and Rachel nail it." The Wall Street Journal's Raymund Flandez described it as "so sublime that it could have fit so easily in the cast version of the musical's CD". While Benigno wished the song had started two-voice harmony sooner, he gave it an "A−" and called it "friggin' lovely". Among the less favorable comments, VanDerWerff felt that the song itself was "pretty weak".

Usher's "Yeah!" by an unnamed all-female a cappella group received variant opinions. Aly Semigran of MTV said that the group "nailed" the song, but Benigno found the track and performers annoying and gave it a "D−". Futterman noted, "the arrangement feels flat and the dancing is overexaggerated", and Hankinson called this song and the Vocal Adrenaline offering, "As Long As You're There", "meh". The latter song also garnered divergent opinions, from Kubicek's "neither fun nor interesting" to Gonzalez's award of an "A+", her best grade of the show. Futterman wrote that Sunshine handled her ballad with "masterful skill and unbelievable ease".

The two original songs sung by New Directions were rated from excellent to abysmal. Benigno gave each song a "B+"; he called the duet, "Pretending", "lovely". The nicest thing Kubicek wrote of it was that it sounded as if the lyrics had been "written by a lovesick teenage boy", and he called "Light Up the World" a "trainwreck". Berk was even harsher: "When the show has carte blanche access to every amazing song in the history of popular music, there's something terribly humiliating about watching the kids sing this shit tune as their finale, and do so with such desperate conviction." Gonzalez gave "Light Up the World" a "B+", but said it sounded a "bit too much" like "Loser Like Me", and while Benigno thought it had a better melody than "Loser" and also made "much better use of the Gleeks as a whole", he criticized the chorus for its similarity to "Let It Rock" by Kevin Rudolf. Semigran said it was an "uplifting, if not rather lackluster pop song", yet Hankinson called it his favorite number in the episode.

=== Chart history ===
Three original songs and two cover versions that were featured in the episode debuted on numerous musical charts. The two original songs sung by the main Glee cast did best, with "Light Up the World" debuting at number thirty-three on the Billboard Hot 100, on an issue dated for June 11, 2011. It sold 86,000 copies in the United States in its first week since its release as a digitally downloadable single, and "Pretending" was in fortieth with 79,000 sold. The third single, a cover of "For Good" from Wicked, charted at number fifty-eight, and the other cover, the mash-up "I Love New York / New York, New York", debuted at number eighty-one. The third original song, "As Long As You're There", sung by Jake Zyrus, was number ninety-three. In the Canadian Top 100, "Light Up the World" debuted at number twenty-six, "Pretending" at number forty, "For Good" at number seventy-nine, and "I Love New York / New York, New York" at number eighty-one.

Of the nine songs that were performed in the episode, four were featured on the eighth soundtrack album of the series, Glee: The Music, Volume 6: the three original songs, "Light Up the World", "Pretending", and "As Long As You're There", plus the cover of "Bella Notte". The album was released the day before the episode aired, and debuted at number four on the US Billboard 200 and number one on Billboard's Soundtracks chart. It sold 80,000 copies in its first week, which was the second-lowest opening sales figure for a Glee release next to the extended play Glee: The Music, The Rocky Horror Glee Show, and lower than the 86,000 sold by Glee: The Music Presents the Warblers in its first week the previous month. The album was also at number four on the Billboard Canadian Albums chart.
