= Prom Queen (Glee) =

- Glee episode
- Episode no.: Season 2 Episode 20
- Directed by: Eric Stoltz
- Written by: Ian Brennan
- Production code: 2ARC20
- Original air date: May 10, 2011

Guest appearances
- Jonathan Groff as Jesse St. James; Iqbal Theba as Principal Figgins; Charlotte Ross as Judy Fabray; Harry Shum, Jr. as Mike Chang; Chord Overstreet as Sam Evans; Darren Criss as Blaine Anderson; Ashley Fink as Lauren Zizes; Max Adler as Dave Karofsky; Josh Sussman as Jacob Ben Israel; Mary Gillis as Mrs. Hagberg; Lauren Potter as Becky Jackson

Episode chronology
← Previous "Rumours"	Next → "Funeral"
- Glee season 2

"Prom Queen" is the twentieth episode of the second season of the American musical television series Glee, and the forty-second overall. It aired May 10, 2011, on Fox in the United States. The episode was written by series creator Ian Brennan, directed by Eric Stoltz, and featured the return of guest star Jonathan Groff. In "Prom Queen", the McKinley High School glee club New Directions is tapped to provide the music for the school's junior prom. The episode shows the myriad dramas surrounding a high school prom, with the high-stakes race for prom king and queen that involves five members of the glee club, students scrambling to find dates and outfits, and the delights and disappointments of the prom itself.

Upon its initial airing, this episode was viewed by 9.29 million American viewers and garnered a 3.7/11 Nielsen rating/share in the 18–49 demographic. The total viewership was up slightly from the previous episode, "Rumours". The episode received mixed reviews, which generally favored the final segment with the prom king and queen denouement over the earlier portions of the show. The music, however, was mostly received with enthusiasm, and special praise was given to the pre-prom renditions of "Rolling in the Deep" and "Isn't She Lovely". Six songs were covered, all of which were released as singles and charted on the Billboard Hot 100.

== Plot ==
As the McKinley High junior prom approaches, Finn Hudson (Cory Monteith) and Quinn Fabray (Dianna Agron) are front-runners to be crowned prom king and queen, thanks to Quinn’s secret cheating ways to keep her popularity status and to prevent Finn from talking to Rachel. Contender Noah "Puck" Puckerman (Mark Salling) learns that his relationship with Lauren Zizes (Ashley Fink) has damaged his bad boy reputation, and resolves to restore it by spiking the prom punch bowl. Meanwhile, Dave Karofsky (Max Adler) and Santana Lopez (Naya Rivera) intensify their election efforts with their anti-bullying group, the Bully Whips.

Principal Figgins (Iqbal Theba) asks the school glee club, New Directions, to perform at the prom. Dateless members Mercedes Jones (Amber Riley), Rachel Berry (Lea Michele) and Sam Evans (Chord Overstreet) decide to attend as a group on a budget. Rachel's ex-boyfriend Jesse St. James (Jonathan Groff) returns and sings an impromptu duet of "Rolling in the Deep" with her. He apologizes for treating her badly, and joins her prom group.

Kurt Hummel (Chris Colfer) asks Blaine Anderson (Darren Criss) to the prom; Blaine reveals that he was beaten up after a formal dance at his old school shortly after coming out, but agrees to go. He and Kurt's father Burt (Mike O'Malley) express misgivings about Kurt's daring homemade prom outfit, which includes a kilt, but Kurt is determined to be himself and wear it. Pleased by the sudden absence of homophobic bullying at school, Kurt suggests that his former tormentor Karofsky should consider coming out. Karofsky refuses, but makes a tearful apology to Kurt.

Artie Abrams (Kevin McHale) asks his ex-girlfriend Brittany Pierce (Heather Morris) to prom by serenading her with "Isn't She Lovely?", but she declines, and Artie joins Puck in planning to spike the punch. At the prom, the two of them and Sam sing "Friday". Rachel performs "Jar of Hearts", and Blaine, backed up by Brittany and Tina Cohen-Chang (Jenna Ushkowitz), sings "I'm Not Gonna Teach Your Boyfriend How to Dance with You". Jealous by Jesse's reunion with Rachel, Finn starts a fight with him, and ends up punching him in the face, luckily Jesse isn’t hurt. The two are ejected by Sue Sylvester (Jane Lynch), who also catches Artie pouring liquid into the punch. Artie refuses to implicate Puck in the wrongdoing, and ultimately confesses to using non-alcoholic lemonade.

Karofsky is elected prom king, and non-candidate Kurt is elected prom queen meant as a derogatory prank thanks to Jacob Ben Israel's poll. Kurt runs from the gym in humiliation and is consoled by Blaine. Angered at being found out having lost, Quinn slaps Rachel, though she immediately regrets it, while Santana is comforted by Brittany, who tells her to be herself rather than hide her lesbian identity. Kurt is able to calm down and return for his coronation; his comment—"Eat your heart out, Kate Middleton"—garners applause that swells into an ovation. Karofsky, abruptly faced with having to publicly dance with another boy in the traditional dance between King and Queen, cannot do it; rejecting Kurt's suggestion that he come out then and there, he instead leaves Kurt alone on the dance floor. Blaine asks Kurt to dance with him ("Dancing Queen"), and they are soon joined by the rest of the student body.

== Production ==
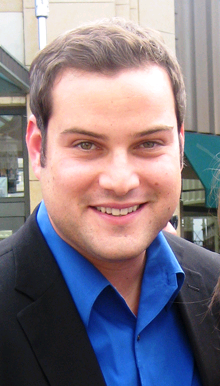
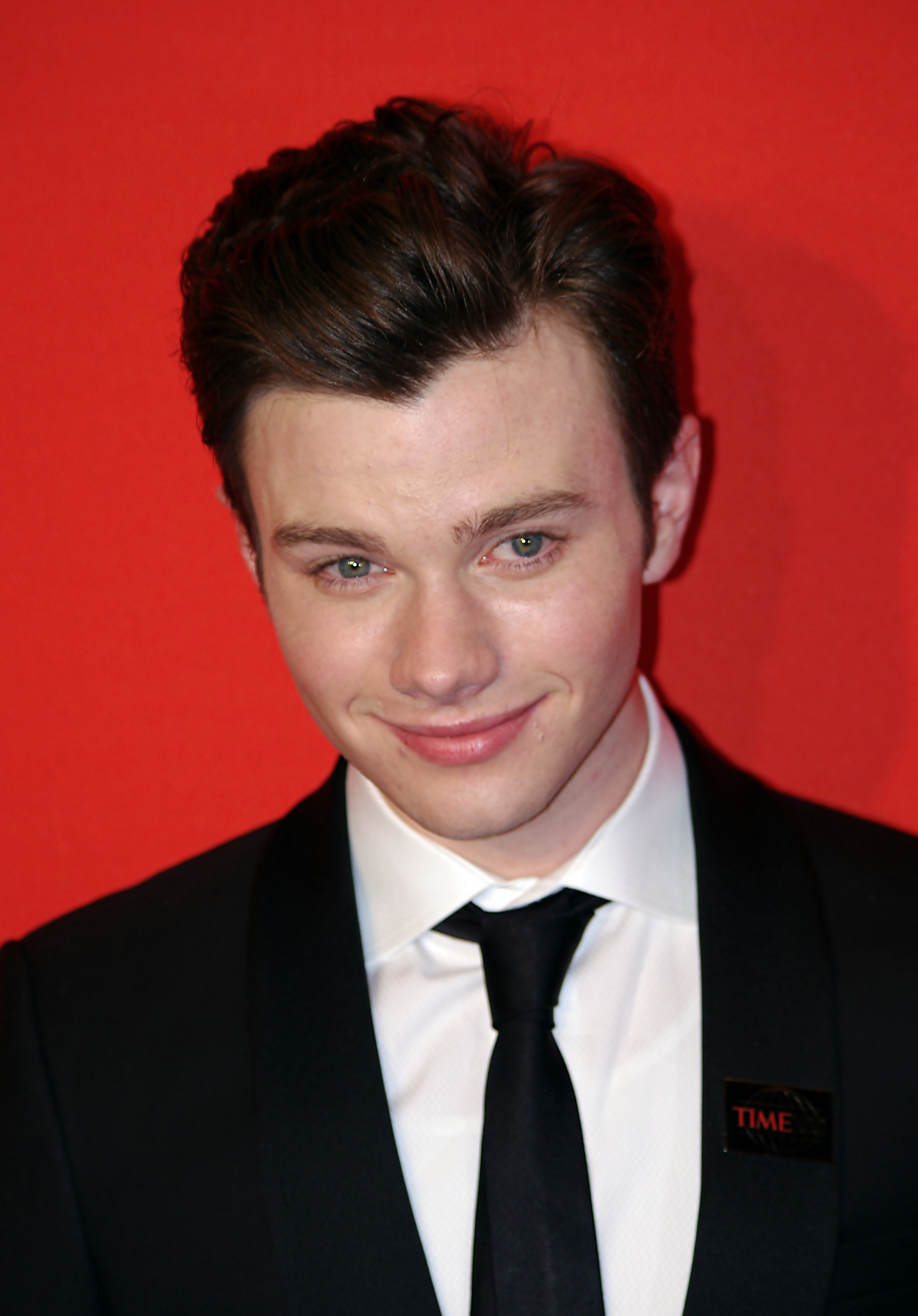
The crowning of Karofsky (Adler, left) and Kurt (Colfer, right) as prom king and queen leaked in advance of the episode's broadcast.

Jesse St. James (Groff), who was the star of rival show choir Vocal Adrenaline and appeared in several episodes to romance Rachel during the first season prior to breaking up with her shortly before the Regionals competition, returned in this episode. Quinn's mother Judy Fabray (Charlotte Ross) also returned. Other recurring characters who appeared included glee club members Mike Chang (Harry Shum, Jr.), Sam Evans (Overstreet) and Lauren Zizes (Fink), Principal Figgins (Theba), school reporter Jacob Ben Israel (Josh Sussman), cheerleader Becky Jackson (Lauren Potter), Kurt's boyfriend Blaine Anderson (Criss) and former school bully Dave Karofsky (Adler). Adler felt that the episode was the first time viewers saw Karofsky's true self. Following its broadcast, he recounted receiving messages from people who had been inspired to come out, and commented, "I can't believe that this episode of television is seriously changing some lives. It's an incredible experience."

On April 17, 2011, an extra named Nicole Crowther revealed the prom king and queen result on the social networking Twitter. Co-creator Brad Falchuk replied to her, "hope you're qualified to do something besides work in entertainment. Who are you to spoil something talented people have spent months to create?" As a result, Crowther was reportedly fired from the show, however, Crowther later claimed that she had not been a Glee extra since October 2010, and that she learned the spoiler from a dinner party and not on set. Following the scandal, speculation arose that the ending might be reshot when Monteith tweeted a photograph of himself standing next to Agron, who was wearing a tiara. The show did not comment on this, though Crowther stated that Glee would not be reshooting.

The prom itself took three very long days to shoot, according to Criss, and involved a lot of hard work, though he added that it was "so much fun" and the actors and extras involved "had a blast." In the original script, Kurt was persuaded to attend his coronation by Blaine. Colfer requested that Kurt "do that for himself and not be persuaded by a second party", and events were duly changed. The actor had serious reservations about the episode, and called it "the most difficult" he had worked on; he explained that the combination of Kurt as prom queen, wearing a kilt and tiara and dancing to "Dancing Queen" caused him concern that "they were just pushing it way too much", and that Kurt's "helpful and progressive" depiction would be tarnished. Once completed, Colfer conceded, "it did turn out to be a beautiful episode. I was so wrong."

The episode featured six musical cover versions. Criss performed "I'm Not Gonna Teach Your Boyfriend How to Dance with You" by Black Kids. Rebecca Black's "Friday" was performed by Salling, McHale and Overstreet. Series co-creator Ryan Murphy explained the use of the viral hit as a tribute to popular culture. Michele and Groff covered John Legend's a cappella arrangement of Adele's "Rolling in the Deep". Stevie Wonder's "Isn't She Lovely?" sung by McHale, Christina Perri's "Jar of Hearts" sung by Michele, and ABBA's "Dancing Queen" performed by Riley and Rivera were also featured. All six songs were released as singles, available for digital download.

== Reception ==
=== Ratings ===
"Prom Queen" was first broadcast on May 10, 2011 in the United States on Fox. It garnered a 3.7/11 Nielsen rating/share in the 18–49 demographic, and received 9.29 million American viewers during its initial airing. It ranked as the second most-watched scripted show of the week among adults aged 18–49. The total viewership for this episode was up from the previous episode, "Rumours"—which was watched by 8.85 million American viewers upon first airing—though the rating/share remained flat.

The episode's Canadian broadcast, also on May 10, 2011, drew 1.82 million viewers and placed sixteenth in the weekly program rankings. Again, viewership increased on "Rumours", which was watched by 1.49 million viewers and ranked eighteenth. In the UK, where the episode aired on May 23, 2011, it was watched by 2.11 million viewers, which made it the most-watched show on cable for the week. Here too, Glee gained viewers from the previous episode's 2.07 million, which was the second most-watched cable program. In Australia, "Prom Queen" attracted 1.04 million viewers on June 1, 2011, and was the eighth most-watched program of the night and twenty-sixth of the week. This was again up from "Rumours", which received 959,000 viewers, and was the twelfth most-watched show of the night and thirty-second of the week.

=== Critical response ===
The episode received mixed reviews. IGN's Robert Canning gave it a "good" rating of 7.5 out of 10; he wrote, "The episode as a whole was fine for what it was, touching on most of the hallmarks of a decent prom episode", though he "was a bit let down by the final moments of the episode as [he] felt it too quickly tried to pin a happy ending on everything". He also called the drama around Rachel and Jesse and Quinn and Finn "superficial stuff". This view was shared by Meghan Brown of The Atlantic who said much of the drama "felt shallow and forced", except for the first Kurt and Karofsky scene, which she described as "painful and poignant". Brown's colleague, Kevin Fallon, stated that "Like prom, this episode was Glee at its best and its worst", and MTV's Aly Semigran thought that it "wasn't as strong—or cohesive—as last week's 'Rumours'", but said it "certainly had its moments, especially some notably hilarious ones." Emily VanDerWerff of The A.V. Club wrote, "If the entirety of this show were like the last 10 minutes of this episode, it just might be the best show on TV."

While VanDerWerff liked the rendition of "Rolling in the Deep", she felt that the return of Jesse and its resulting storyline "was a mess" and "just didn't work". Canning wrote that it was "difficult to truly feel for" the drama surrounding Jesse and Rachel, or the resulting brawl and slap, and Brown thought these developments "lacked any real emotional stakes, and seemed tonally inconsistent with the snarky snap of the rest of the episode". VanDerWerff found the otherwise excellent final segment marred by Quinn's regression to a "generic bitchy cheerleader" stereotype.

Canning criticized Sue's "unfunny torture bits" and called the idea "too over-the-top to actually work", though Amy Reiter of the Los Angeles Times was happy to get "more great lines from Sue, who was the right blend of evil and funny". VanDerWerff felt that her role was too prominent, and that the Puck and Artie storyline, with the exception of Artie trying to make up with Brittany, was "fairly painful".

Colfer as Kurt received positive comments in most reviews. Semigran wrote, "I give Chris Colfer all the credit in the world, because no matter what the material, he knocks it out of the park every time." James Poniewozik of Time agreed that given the episode's material, "it's important to have it in the hands of an actor as good as Chris Colfer". The scene with Kurt, Burt, Finn and Blaine was singled out by Jenna Mullins of E! Online, who observed that it "quickly turned into much more than just prom ensembles. It's the jumps from quirky to heavy that make Glee special, and I love watching the cast handle so much in one scene."

Although Canning said that the announcement of Kurt as prom queen "effectively caught [him] off guard, right in the gut, as good TV should", others were critical of the story at that moment, including Brown, who said that there was no logic to Kurt's victory, no explanation of how it might have happened, and no sense in Figgins acceding to it. Semigran and VanDerWerff also called Figgins's actions into question. The sequence after the announcement was lauded by Fallon and Canning, who were impressed by the spliced presentation of multiple aftermaths. Poniewozik said it led to the episode's "theme of community—that is, that not all these characters' problems may be equal, but that they're best able to handle them when they recognize what they have in common. Everyone ... can feel like an outsider on prom night." VanDerWerff also talked about the sense of community, which "has mostly been absent in season two", and noted that "Glee somehow found a way to show off the best AND worst of high school and worked past its own storytelling issues to capture raw emotion."

=== Music and performances ===
The musical performances in "Prom Queen" were praised more than the episode itself. Anthony Benigno of The Faster Times called it "the best musical night this show's had in eight months", and Fallon characterized the numbers as "pretty darned good". Brett Berk of Vanity Fair had the opposite view: he gave three of the six songs a single star out of five, his lowest grade, and two more only received two stars."

"Rolling in the Deep" as sung by Rachel and Jesse received considerable praise, though Berk gave it a single star because it was an Adele song, and Entertainment Weekly's Sandra Gonzalez would have given it an "A" if she had "never heard the Adele version", but as she had, gave it a "B−" instead. Among the many favorable comments, John Kubicek of BuddyTV called it "one of the best vocal performances this show has ever seen". Benigno complimented Groff and Michele's "fantastic voices", gave the song an "A" and wrote simply, "they crush it". Rolling Stone's Erica Futterman called the performance a "passion-filled winner", though she detected "some oversinging".

"Isn't She Lovely" was as enthusiastically received—it was Brown's "favorite number", and she added that Artie's "voice sounded great". It was also Berk's favorite; he commented, "I still melt at Artie's serenade", and gave it four stars out of five. Gonzalez and Benigno both gave it an "A", and the latter explained: "the arrangement ... gives the track a wonderful, spontaneous feel", and "this nerdy white boy has himself some soul." Kubicek dissented, and explained that Artie getting emotional in song two weeks in a row "is a tad boring". While most reviewers disliked "Friday" in the original, Rebecca Black version, the commentary for the prom incarnation sung by Puck, Sam and Artie was generally positive despite this—Gonzalez said she hated herself "for giving this horrendously addictive version of a horrendous song a B." VanDerWerff said the song was "way, way, way too long, though it was more fun than [he] expected it to be", Raymund Flandez of The Wall Street Journal called it "darn good and infectious", and Mullins said it was "much catchier than the original". Benigno gave the song an "A−", and called it a "rafter-raiser".

The remaining songs were reviewed less widely. "Jar of Hearts" was praised by Mullins as an "absolutely beautiful performance", and Fallon said it was "haunting and filmed gorgeously". Kubicek wrote, "it's nice to just hear her sing a song", and also stated that the two songs Rachel sang in the episode were "two of [his] favorite songs from the entire season". Benigno gave it a "B", his lowest grade of the night, and asked the show to "stop doing these numbers": "We get it. She's in pain and she can sing. Move on." He gave "I'm Not Gonna Teach Your Boyfriend How to Dance With You" an "A", and questioned why it had taken so long for Criss to receive numbers independent of the Warblers. Kubicek wrote that it was "Blaine doing what Blaine does best: fun bubblegum pop", but Gonzalez was surprised that she did not love it and gave it a "B", as she "really missed the backing of Blaine's Warbler cohorts."

The use of "Dancing Queen" as the song for Kurt's dance was questioned by Benigno, who called it "borderline poor taste", and by VanDerWerff, who felt it was not the "deftest of musical choices"—VanDerWerff was also critical of the illogic behind Santana singing the song for the king-and-queen dance when she was a known prom queen candidate—though Benigno nevertheless gave the song an "A", and Gonzalez gave it an "A−". Some reviewers criticized the performance on musical grounds: Kubicek called it "a simple karaoke version", and lamented that it suffered in comparison to the previous Santana and Mercedes duet, "River Deep – Mountain High", while Futterman faulted the arrangement, which "waters down power vocals", and gave the duo "the thin sound of Abba's original even though they're both much better than that."

=== Chart history ===
All six of the cover versions featured debuted on the Billboard Hot 100, and most featured on other musical charts. On the Hot 100, the show's rendition of "Rolling In The Deep" debuted at number twenty-nine, in the same week that Adele's original version remained at the top of the same chart. It was at number thirty-one on the Canadian Hot 100. The cover of Rebecca Black's "Friday" was at number thirty-four on the Hot 100, and charted higher than Black's original, which peaked at number fifty-eight. It was number thirty-three on the Canadian Hot 100. The other four songs on the Hot 100 were "Jar Of Hearts" at number forty-nine, which also made number thirty-nine on the Canadian Hot 100; "Isn't She Lovely" at number sixty-five, which also made number eighty-three on the Canadian Hot 100; "I'm Not Gonna Teach Your Boyfriend How To Dance With You" at number seventy-two, which also made number eighty-seven on the Canadian Hot 100; and "Dancing Queen" at number seventy-four. Out of the six songs that were featured in the episode, three were featured on the eighth soundtrack album of the series, Glee: The Music, Volume 6: "Rolling In The Deep", "Isn't She Lovely", and "Dancing Queen".
