= Glee: The Music, The Rocky Horror Glee Show =

EP by Glee Cast
- Released: October 19, 2010
- Recorded: 2010
- Genre: Rock, soundtrack
- Length: 21:27
- Label: Columbia / 20th Century Fox TV
- Producer: Dante Di Loreto (exec.), Brad Falchuk (exec.), Adam Anders, Peer Åström, Ryan Murphy

Glee Cast chronology
Glee: The Music, Journey to Regionals (2010)	Glee: The Music, The Rocky Horror Glee Show (2010)	Glee: The Music, The Christmas Album (2010)

Glee: The Music, The Rocky Horror Glee Show is the third extended play (EP) by the cast of the musical television series Glee, released on October 19, 2010. It contains seven songs and accompanies the episode "The Rocky Horror Glee Show", originally aired October 26, 2010 on Fox. The Halloween episode sees the glee club recreating the 1973 comedy horror musical The Rocky Horror Show, written and composed by Richard O'Brien. Dante Di Loreto and Brad Falchuk serve as the executive producers.

== Background and development ==
The Glee episode "The Rocky Horror Glee Show" originally aired October 26, 2010 as part of Fox's series of Halloween-themed episodes, and features a staging of The Rocky Horror Show by the school's glee club. Plans for the episode were revealed at the 2010 San Diego Comic-Con by Glee creator Ryan Murphy after cast member Chris Colfer expressed desire to cover "Time Warp" on the show. Jayma Mays, who plays the role of guidance counselor Emma Pillsbury, auditioned with "Touch-a, Touch-a, Touch-a, Touch Me" and performs the song, with some changes in lyrics. "I'm so going to have to get her to do that on the show," said Murphy on her audition piece. "Whatever Happened to Saturday Night" is sung by John Stamos, and "Damn It, Janet" by Cory Monteith and Lea Michele.

The EP's track list was announced in an official press release on September 28, 2010. It was released digitally and physically on October 19, 2010 in North America.

== Reception ==
Andrew Leahey of allmusic gave a rating of three-and-a-half stars out of five, calling the EP "one of the better recordings in Glee's catalog" and "a tidy, polished, well-sung tribute album." He praised the performances of Naya Rivera, Jayma Mays, and John Stamos, vocalists infrequently heard on the series, but felt the casting of Amber Riley as Dr. Frank-N-Furter was misplaced.

Glee: The Music, The Rocky Horror Glee Show debuted at number six on the Billboard 200 the week of October 27, 2010, with 48,000 copies sold, the lowest debut and sales for the cast in the United States. This debut made Glee the first television series to have six or more soundtracks chart in the chart's top ten, and marked the highest position ever reached for a Rocky Horror album. As of April 2011, the EP is Glee's lowest-selling in the US, with 160,000 copies.

== Track listing ==
All tracks are written by Richard O'Brien.

No.	Title	Length
1.	"Science Fiction Double Feature"	4:28
2.	"Damn It, Janet"	2:41
3.	"Whatever Happened to Saturday Night?" (featuring John Stamos)	3:04
4.	"Sweet Transvestite"	2:59
5.	"Touch a Touch a Touch a Touch Me"	2:29
6.	"There's a Light (Over at the Frankenstein Place)"	2:33
7.	"Time Warp"	3:13
8.	"Planet, Schmanet, Janet" (featuring John Stamos)	1:12

== Credits and personnel ==
Persons credited for the project are as follows.

- Adam Anders – arranger; engineer; producer; soundtrack producer; vocals
- Alex Anders – engineer
- Nikki Anders – vocals
- Peer Åström – arranger; engineer; mixing; producer
- Dave Bett – art direction
- Per Björling – arranger
- PJ Bloom – music supervisor
- Geoff Bywater – executive in charge of music
- Deyder Cintron – assistant engineer
- Kamari Copeland – vocals
- Tim Davis – vocal arrangement; vocal contractor; vocals
- Dante Di Loreto – soundtrack executive producer
- Brad Falchuk – soundtrack executive producer
- Heather Guibert – coordination
- Missi Hale – vocals
- Tobias Kampe-Flygare – vocals
- Storm Lee – vocals
- David Loucks – vocals
- Meaghan Lyons – coordination
- Dominick Maita – mastering
- Maria Paula Marulanda – art direction
- Ryan Murphy – producer; soundtrack producer
- Richard O'Brien – composer
- Martin Persson – arranger; orchestration; programming
- Stefan Persson – string arrangements
- Patrick Randak – photography
- Federico Ruiz – design
- Jenny Sinclair – coordination
- Windy Wagner – vocals

== Charts ==
=== Weekly charts ===
Chart (2010–2011)	Peak position
Australian Albums (ARIA)	8
Canadian Albums (Billboard)	10
Irish Albums (IRMA)	15
UK Albums (OCC)	23
US Billboard 200	6
US Soundtrack Albums (Billboard)	1

=== Year-end charts ===
Chart (2010)	Position
US Soundtrack Albums (Billboard)	23

== Release history ==
Country	Release date	Formats (CD, DD)	Ref.
Canada	October 19, 2010	CD, DD	
Germany	October 19, 2010	CD	
Ireland	October 19, 2010	DD	
United States	October 19, 2010	CD, DD	
Japan	October 26, 2010	CD	
Australia	October 29, 2010	CD, DD	
Taiwan	March 15, 2011	CD	
