= Folklore of Indonesia =

Folklore of the country of Indonesia

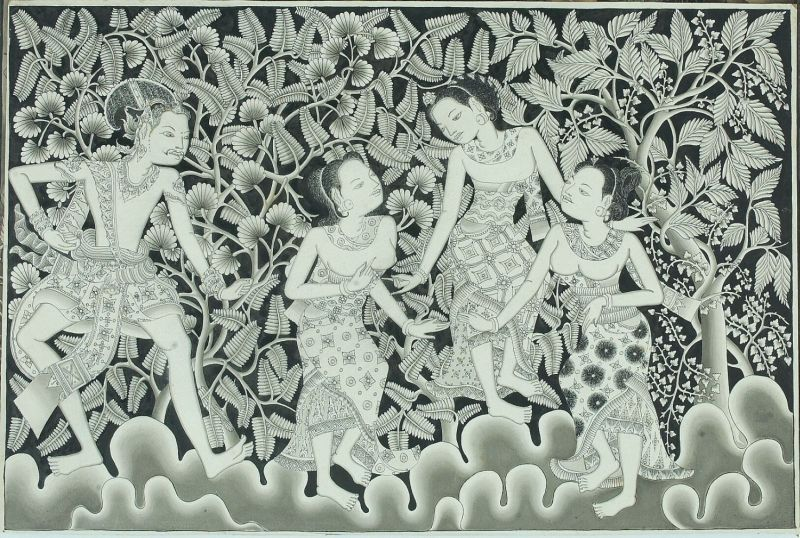
Balinese painting of Prince Panji meeting three women in the jungle.

Folklore of Indonesia is known in Indonesian as dongeng (lit. 'tale'), cerita rakyat (lit. 'people's story') or folklor (lit. 'folklore'), refer to any folklore found in Indonesia. Its origins are probably an oral culture, with a range of stories of heroes associated with wayang and other forms of theatre, transmitted outside of a written culture. Folklores in Indonesia are closely connected with mythology.

== Themes ==
Indonesian folklore reflects the diverse culture of Indonesia as well as the diversity of ethnic groups in Indonesia. Many ethnic groups have their own collection of tales and folklore that have been told for generations. The stories are usually told to children as bedtime stories and have pedagogical values such as kindness, benevolence, modesty, honesty, bravery, patience, persistence, virtue, and morality. For example, one popular theme is "the truth will always prevail, and evil will always be defeated."

While most Indonesian folkloric stories have happy endings and 'happily ever after' themes, some employ tragedy and have sad endings.

== Forms ==
Most Indonesian folklore started as an oral tradition told by storytellers and parents for generations within Indonesian villages. The stories were often sung or chanted in several oral traditions such as pantun, tembang, or children's chants. Some were performed in performing arts such as wayang and sendratari (dance drama). In Malay tradition, some of them are written in scripture as hikayat, while in Javanese tradition, several stories are connected with historical figures and historical records such as babad or older kakawin scriptures such as Pararaton. Indian Hindu-Buddhist epics also influenced Indonesian folklore, especially through wayang and dance drama in Java and Bali. The Hindu epics the Ramayana and Mahabharata have become their own separate versions with Indonesian twists and interpretations that often differ from the Indian versions. The Buddhist Jataka tales also has made their way into Indonesian fables and animal folklore. Jataka stories are found carved as narrative bas-reliefs on ancient Javanese candis, such as the Mendut, Borobudur and Sajiwan temples; telling animal fables about the virtues of Buddha, who performed exceptional acts of kindness in his animal incarnations before being reborn as a Boddhisattva and the future Buddha.

These stories have been collected and used in the Indonesian education system, in small cheap books, usually tied in with a district or region of Indonesia. Many stories explain events or establish moral allegories using iconic or symbolic characters of the past. They also seek to explain the origins of names of people and places from Folk etymology.

During the Suharto era, there were sections of the Indonesian Department of Education and Culture that researched and wrote reports on collected cerita rakyat.

== List of Indonesian folklore ==
There are several genres of Indonesian folklore.

=== Tales ===
The story of the struggle of a common protagonist to finally achieve happiness despite facing many problems.

- Ande Ande Lumut
- Bawang Putih Bawang Merah
- Jaka Tarub
- Timun Mas
- Roro Mendut
- Putri Tangguk
- Calon Arang

=== Legends ===
The stories that try to explain the origins of certain places, names and/or things.

- Aji Saka
- Banyuwangi
- Dewi Sri
- Lanun
- Legend of the Centipede Lake
- Lutung Kasarung
- Minangkabau
- Malin Kundang
- Parahyangan
- Rara Jonggrang
- Sangkuriang
- Sulanjana
- Watu Gunung
- Lake Toba

=== Epic ===
Heroic tales of struggles, battles and war. The story of a hero's adventure and their exploits.

- Ciung Wanara
- Damarwulan
- Dayang Bandir and Sandean Raja
- Ken Arok and Ken Dedes
- Lutung Kasarung
- Mundinglaya Dikusumah
- Pangeran Katak
- Panji Semirang
- Siliwangi
- Si Pitung
- Gurabesi

=== Fable ===
Animal tales, featuring animals that behave like humans or interact and speak with humans.

- Leungli
- Sang Kancil
- Keong Emas
- Cenderawasih
- Siamang putih

=== Myth ===
Witch, demon, spirit or ghost tales, based on urban legends or supernatural phenomena.

- Calon Arang
- Kuntilanak
- Nyai Roro Kidul
- Rangda
- Wewe Gombel
- Sundel Bolong
- Toyol
- Pocong
- Kisut
- Kuyang
- Suanggi
- Ebu Gogo

== By region ==
=== Folklore from Java ===
1. Ciung Wanara (Sundanese)
2. Entong Emas (Sundanese)
3. Keong Emas (Sundanese)
4. Jawara Sagara Kidul (Sundanese)
5. Sangkuriang (Sundanese)
6. Si Buncir, Anak Jelata Jadi Raja Salaka (Sundanese)
7. Si Buntung Jago Tutugan
8. Si Kebayan (Sundanese)
9. Si Keling (Sundanese)
10. Si Rawing (Sundanese)
11. Legenda Batu Menangis (Sundanese)
12. Leungli (Sundanese)
13. Lutung Kasarung (Sundanese)
14. Nini Anteh (Sundanese)
15. Nyai Anteh and the Moon (Sundanese)
16. Situ Bagendit (Sundanese)
17. Telaga Warna (Sundanese)
18. Kalarahu
19. Jaka Tarub and Nawangwulan
20. Origin of the Name Banyuwangi
21. Origin of the Kelud Mountain
22. Origin of the Baturaden
23. Bawang Putih and Bawah Merah
24. Asal Mula Huruf Jawa/Aji Saka
25. Si Wuragil
26. Loro Jonggrang and Bandung Bondowoso
27. Legend of Suronggotho
28. Dewi Sri and Sedana
29. Ande-Ande Lumur and Klenting Kuning
30. Awan Wedus Gembel

=== Folklore from Lesser Sunda Islands ===
1. Cupak ajak Gerantang
2. I Belog Pengangon Bebek
3. I Duma
4. I Ketimun Mas
5. I Lutung Teken I Kakua
6. I Pucung
7. Siap Selem
8. I Sugih ajak I Tiwas
9. Naga Besuki
10. Ni Bawang Teken Ni Kesuna
11. Calon Arang
12. Legenda Komodo
13. Ebu Gogo

=== Folklore from Sumatra ===
1. Asal Mula Danau Laut Tawar
2. Asal Mula Dana Si Losung dan Si Pinggan
3. Asal Mula Sungai Ombilin dan Danau Singkar
4. Asal Usul Silampari
5. Buaya Perompak
6. Hang Tuah
7. Hikayat Keramat Bujang
8. Kera Putih dan Tali Kapal
9. Kisah Pohon Enau
10. Legenda Batu Gantung
11. Legenda Beru Ginting Sope Mbelin
12. Legenda Danau Toba
13. Legenda Ikan Patin
14. Legenda Lau Kawar
15. Legenda Mas Merah
16. Legenda Namora Pande Bosi
17. Legenda Pulau Kapal
18. Legenda Putri Bidadari
19. Legenda Putri Hijau
20. Legenda Putri Nai Mangale
21. Legenda Putri Runduk
22. Legenda Putri Ular dari Simalungun
23. Legenda Sampuraga
24. Si Gale-Gale Legend
25. Legenda Simardan
26. Legenda si Lancang
27. Legenda Ular Kepala Tujuh
28. Musang Berjanggut
29. Pati Enggang dan Rio Brani
30. Putri Pandan Berduri
31. Dragon Princess
32. Raja Pareeket
33. Raja yang Culas
34. Malin Kundang
35. Si Miskin yang Tamak
36. Si Pahit Lidah
37. Si Sigarlaki dan si Limbat
38. Sungai Jodoh
39. Ting Gegenting
40. Ular n'Daung
41. The Legend Of The Origin Of The Silver Catfish
42. Kisah Putri Ular

=== Folklore from Kalimantan ===
1. Legend of the Centipede Lake (Legenda Danau Lipan)
2. The Greedy Fisherman (Asal Muasal Sungai Kawat)

=== Folklore from Papua ===
1. Biwar the Dragon Slayer
2. Kweiya
3. The Story of the Caracal and the Quail
4. Watuwe the Mystic Crocodile
5. The Origin of Four Kings

=== Folklore from Sulawesi ===
1. The Origin of the Mermaid
2. Legend of the La Dana and Buffalo
3. La Upe and Stepmother
4. Pakande the Grandmother
5. Putri Tandampalik
6. Sawerigading & We Tenriabeng
7. Lamadukelleng the Crowned Prince

=== Folklore from Moluccas ===
1. Nenek Luhu
2. Batu Badaong
3. Bulu Pamali
4. Suanggi
5. Legenda Tanifai
6. Buaya Tembaga
7. Petualangan Empat Kapiten
8. Batu Belah
9. Asal Mula Telaga Biru
10. Ma Kolano o Kariànga

== Further reading (in English) ==
- Moertjipto (1992). Folktales of Yogyakarta South Coast. Translated by Hartiko, Hari. Directorate General of Tourism, Republic of Indonesia.

== Further reading (In Indonesian) ==
- Danandjaja, James (1992) Cerita Rakyat dar Jawa Tengah Jakarta: Grasindo. ISBN 979-553-038-0
- Setyawan, Dwianto (1992) Cerita Rakyat dari Jawa Timur Jakarta: Grasindo. ISBN 979-553-089-5
- Soemanto, Bakdi (1992) Cerita Rakyat dari Yogyakarta Jakarta: Grasindo. ISBN 979-553-088-7
- Soemanto, Bakdi (1995) Cerita Rakyat dari Yogyakarta 2 Jakarta: Grasindo. ISBN 979-553-683-4
- Soepanto, ed (1976) Ceritera Rakyat Daerah Istimewa Yogyakarta Yogyakarta: Proyek Penelitian dan Pencatatan Kebudayaan Daerah.
