= Kampong Buang Tekurok =

Kampong Buang Tekurok Kampung Buang Tekurok
- Village
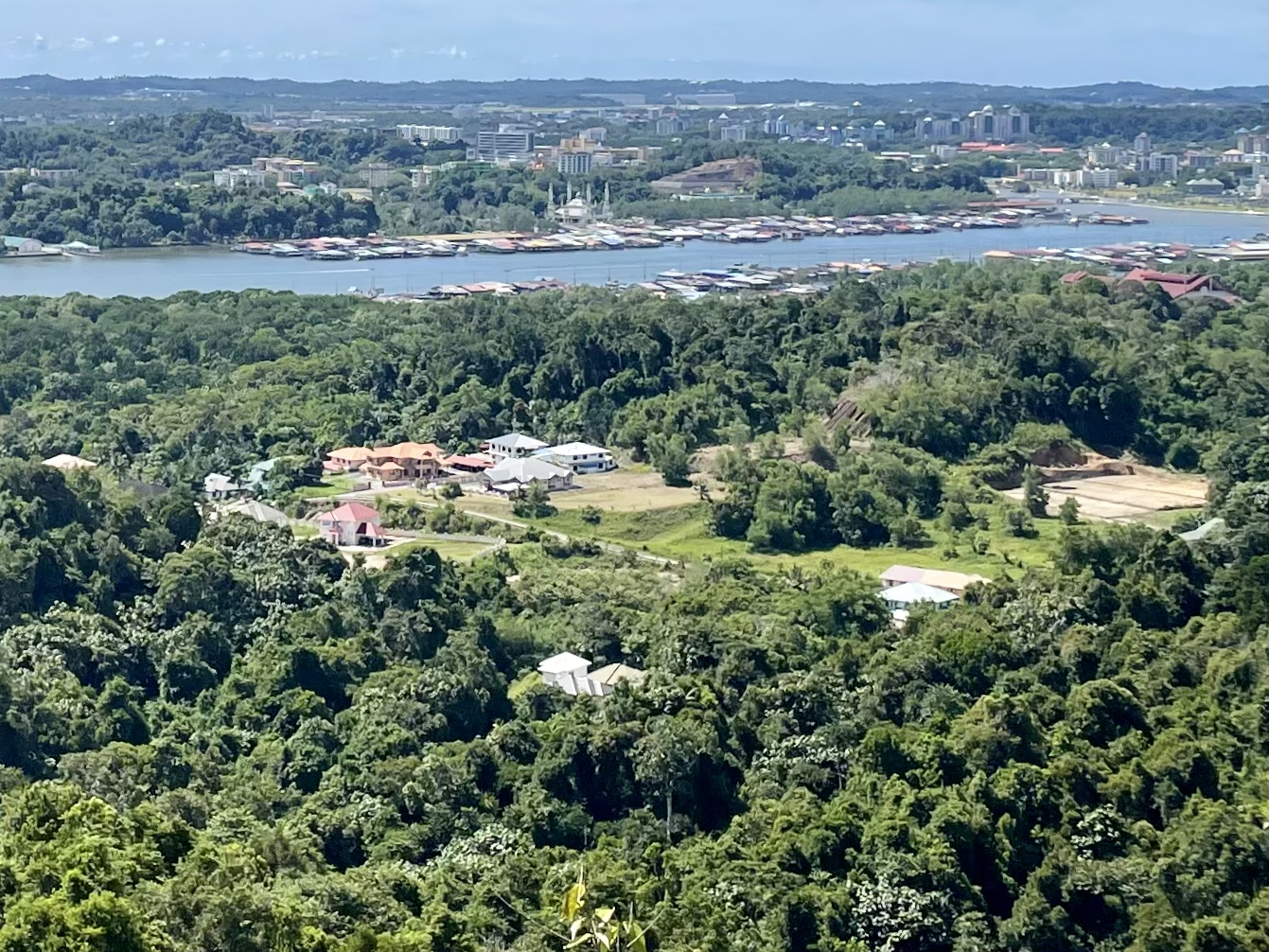
- The village seen from Saeh Hill

- Location in Brunei
- Coordinates: 4°52′02″N 114°55′59″E
- Country: Brunei
- District: Brunei–Muara
- Mukim: Lumapas

Government
  - Village head: Amran Maidin
- Postcode: BJ2924

Kampong Buang Tekurok (Malay: Kampung Buang Tekurok) is a village-level subdivision of Lumapas, a mukim (subdistrict) of Brunei–Muara District, Brunei. The postcode for Kampong Buang Tekurok is BJ2524.

== Name ==
Kampong Buang Tekurok comes from the Malay name which translates as 'Buang Tekurok Village'.

== Places of interest ==
Jong Batu, a rock formation in the Brunei River, nearby Buang Tekurok, tied to the local legend of Nakhoda Manis. In the story, Nakhoda Manis is a son who, after gaining wealth, disowns and mistreats his mother. As a result, he is cursed, and his ship and himself turn to stone, becoming Jong Batu. This tale serves as a moral lesson about the consequences of disrespecting one’s parents.

Buang Tekurok Laut Cemetery is notable for being the burial site of Dato Haji Ahmad, also known as Haji Ahmad Banjar. Originally from Banjarmasin, Indonesia, he came to Brunei during Sultan Abdul Momin's reign and became a prominent Islamic teacher and qadhi. According to local legend, he was miraculously born in his mother's grave after she died while pregnant, leading to his survival despite extraordinary circumstances. Settling in Kampong Burong Pingai Ayer, he taught religious knowledge and organised congregational prayers, attracting followers from nearby villages. Sultan Abdul Momin later appointed him as supervisor of Islamic development, expanding his influence. His home became a hub for Islamic learning, prompting the construction of a larger station for visitors. In recognition of his services, he was granted the right to collect revenue from specific areas in Brunei and Limbang.
