= Kabayan (disambiguation) =

Kabayan is the nickname for Noli de Castro, a Filipino broadcaster who served as the 12th vice president of the Philippines.

Kabayan may also refer to:

- Kabayan (radio program), a radio program hosted by Noli de Castro
- Kabayan (fictional character), a Sudanese folklore character
- Kabayan, Benguet, a municipality in the Philippines
- Kabalikat ng Mamamayan, a party-list abbreviated as KABAYAN

== See also ==
- Kababayan
