= Audition (Glee) =

- Glee episode
- Episode no.: Season 2 Episode 1
- Directed by: Brad Falchuk
- Written by: Ian Brennan
- Production code: 2ARC01
- Original air date: September 21, 2010

Guest appearances
- Cheyenne Jackson as Dustin Goolsby; Iqbal Theba as Principal Figgins; Dot-Marie Jones as Shannon Beiste; Jake Zyrus (Note: Credited as Charice.) as Sunshine Corazon; Harry Shum, Jr. as Mike Chang; Chord Overstreet as Sam Evans; Josh Sussman as Jacob Ben Israel; Dustin Ingram as the pizza delivery guy; James Earl as Azimio; Max Adler as Dave Karofsky; Lauren Potter as Becky Jackson

Episode chronology
← Previous "Journey to Regionals"	Next → "Britney/Brittany"
- Glee season 2

"Audition" is the second season premiere and twenty-third episode overall of the American television series Glee. The episode was written by Ian Brennan, directed by Brad Falchuk, and premiered on the Fox network on September 21, 2010. In "Audition", the glee club members attempt to attract new recruits, including foreign exchange student Sunshine Corazon (Jake Zyrus) and transfer student Sam Evans (Chord Overstreet). A new football coach, Shannon Beiste (Dot-Marie Jones), arrives at McKinley High, and school blogger Jacob Ben Israel (Josh Sussman) provides updates on the glee club's summer break.

The episode features eight musical and dance performances, five of which were released as singles, available for download. Musical performances attracted mixed reviews from critics. Lea Michele's rendition of "What I Did for Love" from A Chorus Line was described by Robert Bianco of USA Today as putting "every amateur musical performance on every TV talent show this year to shame", though both Mary McNamara of the Los Angeles Times and Emily VanDerWerff of The A.V. Club found it incongruous in context. Zyrus's performances were well received by American and Filipino critics, and Alicia Keys expressed approval of the Glee cast cover of "Empire State of Mind."

"Audition" was watched by 12.45 million American viewers, and attained Glee's series high Nielsen rating in the 18–34 demographic. It received generally favorable reviews from critics, and Entertainment Weekly's Tim Stack and the New York Post's Jarett Wieselman both stated that it had assuaged their fears of the show declining in quality in its second season. Brett Berk of Vanity Fair and Rolling Stone's Erica Futterman both felt the show had returned to form following an increasingly disappointing first season. Several critics highlighted racial issues with the episode: Fred Topel of Hollywood News described a scene involving Sunshine as "downright racist".

== Plot ==
Following New Directions' loss at Regionals, the glee club members attempt to recruit new students to bolster their competition performances. Upon learning that Nationals will be held in New York this year, they decide to perform "Empire State of Mind" in the school courtyard, hoping to pique the interest of their schoolmates. Foreign exchange student Sunshine Corazon (Jake Zyrus) from the Philippines and transfer student Sam Evans (Chord Overstreet) take notice and are intrigued by the performance. Club co-captain Rachel Berry (Lea Michele) later encounters Sunshine in the girls' bathroom, and they sing an impromptu duet of "Telephone" by Lady Gaga and Beyoncé. Rachel is intimidated by her performance, and directs Sunshine to an inactive crack house instead of the auditorium in an attempt to sabotage her glee club audition. Rachel is reprimanded by glee club director Will Schuester (Matthew Morrison) when this is discovered. Sunshine later auditions successfully, impressing the club members with her rendition of "Listen" from Dreamgirls.

Co-captain Finn Hudson (Cory Monteith) encourages Sam to audition after overhearing him singing "Every Rose Has Its Thorn" by Poison. In the choir room, Sam, Finn, Mike (Harry Shum Jr.), Artie (Kevin McHale), and Puck (Mark Salling) sing Travie McCoy's "Billionaire" together. However, Sam declines to audition due to the low social status of the glee club members.

Shannon Beiste (Dot-Marie Jones) is appointed as the new coach of McKinley High's failing football team, resulting in reductions to the glee and cheerleading budgets in favor of the football team. Will and cheerleading coach Sue Sylvester (Jane Lynch) team up, hoping to drive Beiste out of the school and have their budgets restored. Amidst her scheming with Will, Sue also demotes Santana (Naya Rivera) from her position as head cheerleader after learning she has had breast implants, replacing her with Quinn (Dianna Agron). Artie asks Finn to help him join the football team. He hopes to win back his girlfriend Tina (Jenna Ushkowitz), who has broken up with him to date Mike. Beiste believes that Finn is colluding against her by forcing her to reject a wheelchair-dependent student, and drops Finn from the team, appointing Sam as the new quarterback. Will is unable to convince her to take Finn back, but realizes that his hostile behavior is hurting his new colleague. Later, he defends Beiste from a Sue-driven sexual harassment accusation by Brittany (Heather Morris), and apologizes, re-earning Sue's enmity.

Acting on her refuelled rivalry with Will, Sue contacts Dustin Goolsby (Cheyenne Jackson), the new director of rival glee club Vocal Adrenaline. Dustin is able to secure permanent US residency for Sunshine and her mother on the proviso that she joins his club. Sunshine confesses that she felt driven out of New Directions by Rachel's hostile behavior. After admitting that she values herself above the other club members, Rachel sings "What I Did for Love" from A Chorus Line alone in the auditorium, before heading to the choir room to apologize.

== Production ==
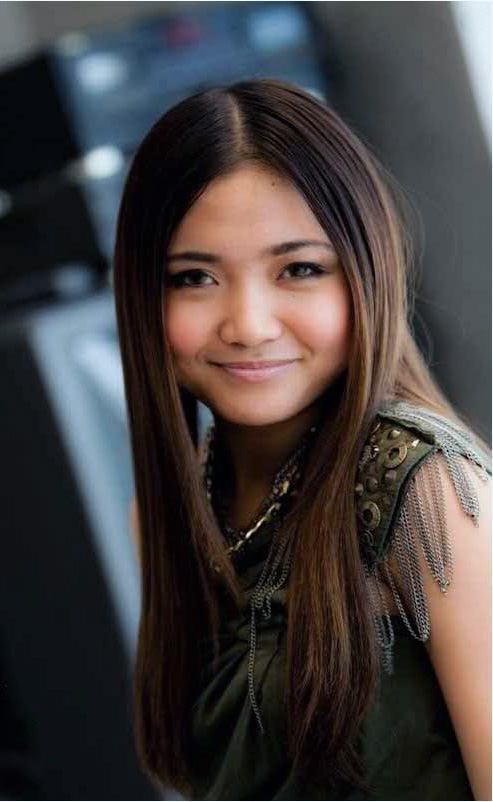
Jake Zyrus (pictured) appears in "Audition" as foreign exchange student Sunshine Corazon.

On January 11, 2010, Fox President Kevin Reilly announced that Glee had been picked up for a second season, and would be holding nationwide, open casting calls to fill three new roles. The auditions were intended to be the subject of a multi-part television special, which would air in the lead-in to the second season premiere, with the new cast members revealed in the first episode. Series creator Ryan Murphy stated that Glee aimed to become "the first interactive musical comedy on television". Ultimately, the reality show did not go ahead, due to Murphy's desire to concentrate on the main series and fear that the distraction of the reality show might damage Glee.

As of "Audition", formerly recurring cast members Heather Morris and Naya Rivera were promoted to series regulars as cheerleaders and glee club members Brittany Pierce and Santana Lopez respectively. The episode introduced four new cast members. Chord Overstreet plays Sam Evans, a recurring character who is initially an athletic protégé of glee club member Finn, but becomes his rival. Jake Zyrus appears as Sunshine Corazon, a foreign exchange student and rival to Rachel. Zyrus was a fan of the show during its first season, and had his manager approach Murphy about casting him in season two. Dot-Marie Jones was cast as football coach Shannon Beiste, replacing season one cast member Patrick Gallagher as Ken Tanaka. Cheyenne Jackson appears as Dustin Goolsby, the new director of rival glee club Vocal Adrenaline, replacing Shelby Corcoran (Idina Menzel). Jackson was originally considered for the role of Will, and in 2009 was cast in the Glee episode "Acafellas" as Vocal Adrenaline choreographer Dakota Stanley, but he was unable to perform due to illness. Murphy described Dustin as "a complete villain", and stated that he would "become very intertwined in Will's life".

== Music ==
The episode featured cover versions of "Empire State of Mind" by Jay-Z featuring Alicia Keys, Lady Gaga's "Telephone" featuring Beyoncé, "Billionaire" by Travie McCoy featuring Bruno Mars and "Every Rose Has Its Thorn" by Poison. "What I Did for Love" from A Chorus Line, "Getting to Know You" from The King and I, and "Listen" from the film adaptation of Dreamgirls were also performed vocally, while "The Power" by Snap! featured as a dance performance. All of the songs performed in the episode except "Every Rose Has Its Thorn", "Getting to Know You" and "The Power" were released as singles, available for download, and "Empire State of Mind" and "Billionaire" are included on the album Glee: The Music, Volume 4. Following their release, over 250,000 Glee tracks were downloaded digitally within the first forty-eight hours, and over 409,000 within the first week, according to Nielsen SoundScan. Additionally, "Empire State of Mind" saw the largest first-day sales for any Glee cover released to that point.

Musical performances in the episode attracted mixed reviews. USA Today's Robert Bianco deemed the highlight "What I Did for Love", and wrote that Michele's performance "puts every amateur musical performance on every TV talent show this year to shame." Raymund Flandez of The Wall Street Journal agreed that it was the best song of the episode, "done with smart aplomb [and] heart". In contrast, Mary McNamara of the Los Angeles Times called it a "non-sequitur song" which "seemed shoehorned in by Michele's agent", Erica Futterman of Rolling Stone deemed it touching but unmemorable, and Emily VanDerWerff of The A.V. Club stated that it was "well-performed" but "so poorly chosen that an emotional moment becomes unintentionally hilarious".

VanDerWerff felt that there were "some odd song choices" throughout, particularly Overstreet's introductory number, which she called "adequate", though he noted that it "doesn't do nearly as good a job at introducing his character" as Zyrus' "Listen". Entertainment Weekly's Tim Stack graded the performance of "Listen" an "A+", and wrote that he wanted to give it a standing ovation. Jacque Wilson of CNN praised both of Zyrus' performances and hoped that he would reappear in the series, while Ricky Lo of The Philippine Star discussed kababayan reception of his role and said that his singing was "drop-dead stunning" and that she "really made Filipinos proud."

MTV's Kyle Anderson commented that the songs overall were "sharp and well-presented"; he highlighted the two hip-hop numbers for particular praise. Anderson felt that the choreography of "Empire State of Mind" compensated for any awkwardness in its delivery, and lauded McHale's "unusual swagger" during "Billionaire". Emily Yahr of The Washington Post'' deemed "Billionaire" the best performance of the episode; her colleague Lisa de Moraes agreed, though she characterized the runner-up performance of "Empire State of Mind" as "maybe-trying-too-hard". Aly Semigran, also writing for MTV, felt "Empire State of Mind" was lacking the gravitas of the original version, but reported that Keys had deemed the Glee cover "amazing".

== Reception ==
=== Ratings ===
In its original broadcast, "Audition" was watched by 12.45 million American viewers. The episode led in the 18–49 demographic for the night, attaining a 5.6/16 Nielsen rating/share, up 50 percent on the first season premiere, "Showmance", in September 2009. It was Glee's second-highest rated telecast ever among adults 18–49, and its series high among adults 18–34, attaining a 6.4/20 rating/share. In Canada, "Audition" was watched by 2.24 million viewers. It was the most-watched programme of the night, and beat Dancing with the Stars, its closest competitor in the 8 pm timeslot, by 170 percent in the 18–49 demographic. In Australia, the episode drew 1.23 million viewers and was the seventh most-watched programme of the night. In the UK, the episode was watched by 2.999 million viewers (2.486 million on E4, and 513,000 on E4+1), becoming the most-watched show on E4 and E4 +1 for the week, and the second most-watched show on cable for the week, as well as hitting a series high for the show.

=== Critical response ===
The episode received generally favorable reviews from critics. VanDerWerff graded the episode "A−". She felt it was imperfect, but that "Audition" demonstrated the Glee executives had learned "a surprising amount about what does and doesn't work within its format". She added, "as a season premiere and promise for what's to come? 'Audition' is very good indeed." David Hinckley of the Daily News rated "Audition" 4/5. He felt that the episode was "a little self-indulgent" with "a dizzying series of cross-plots", but hoped that it was setting the foundations for an "interesting, evolving story" in the season to come. Bianco called the episode a "heady, sometimes-too-rich mix of song-and-dance magic, high school musical spoof and overall excess", and concluded: "It's a mess, but it's the kind of joyous mess that makes you think order can be overrated." Both Amy Reiter of the Los Angeles Times and Jessica Derschwitz of CBS News praised the episode's musical numbers and Sue's lines, while Stack and the New York Post's Jarett Wieselman deemed the episode to have assuaged their worries about Glee experiencing a "sophomore slump" and commented positively on the opening scene that directly addressed criticism of the first season. Vanity Fair's Brett Berk received the episode positively, despite having been disappointed with the second half of the first season, a sentiment shared by Futterman, who deemed "Audition" a "fresh start" after "a first season that devolved into a frenzy of too many songs and not enough long-term plot".

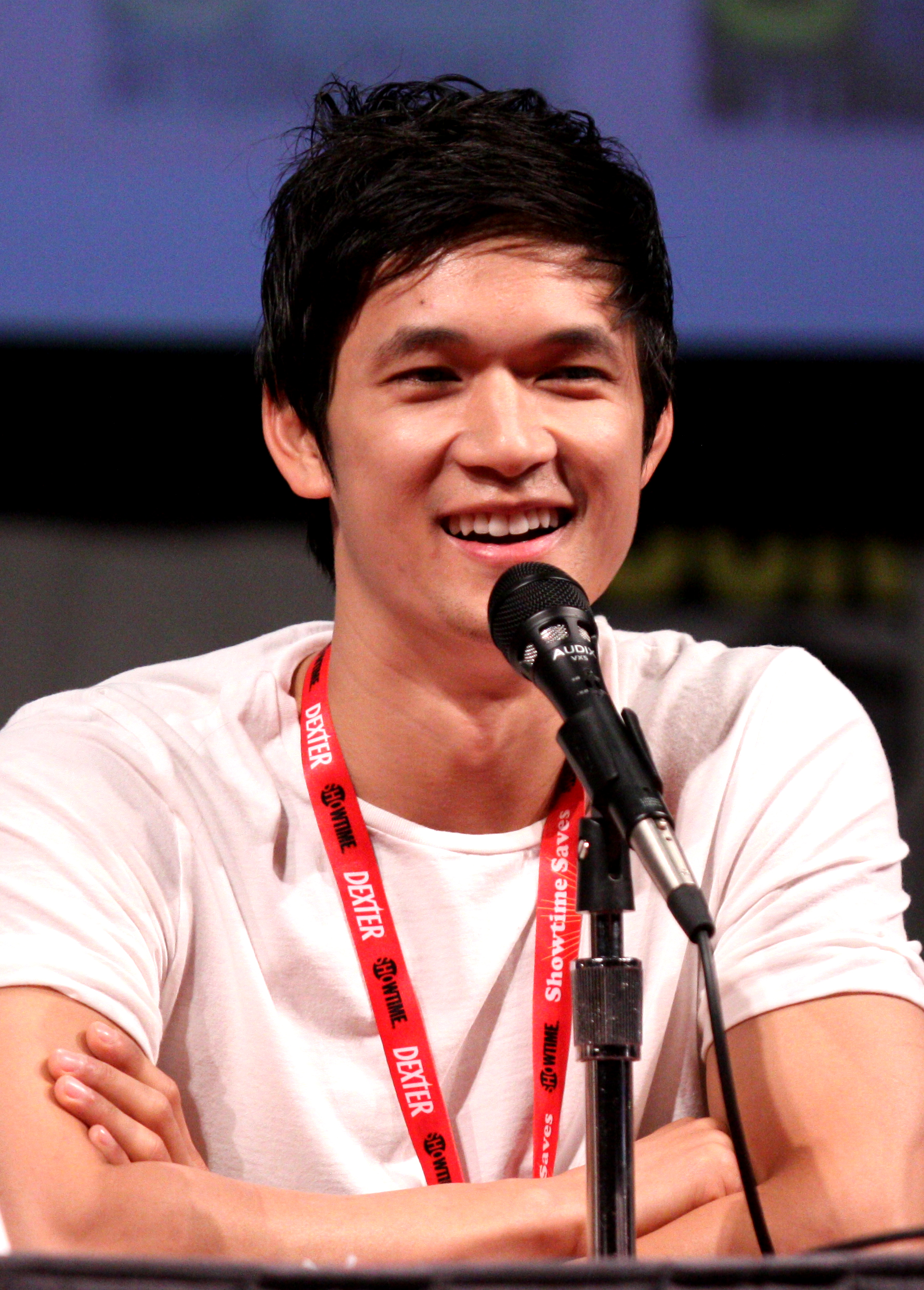
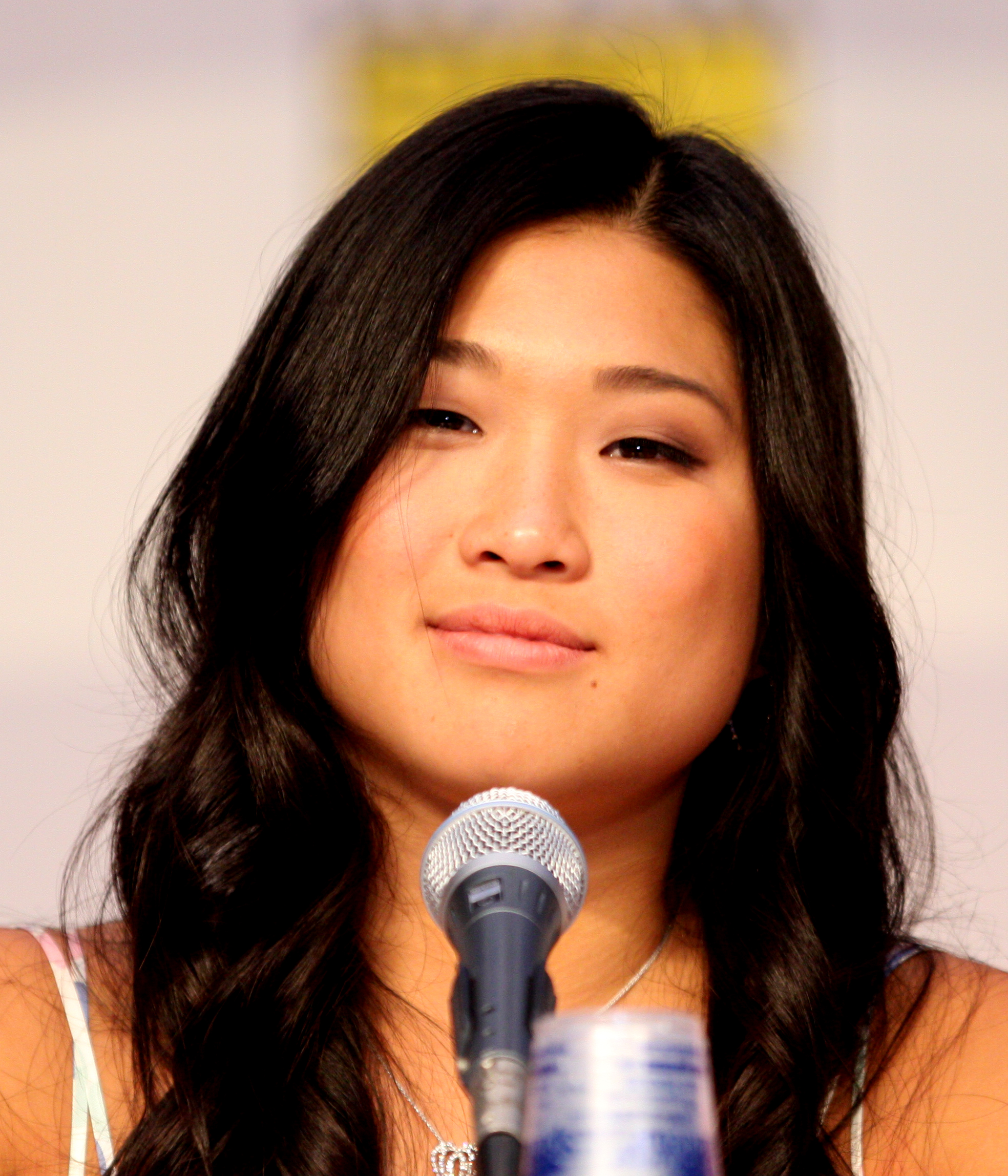
Brittany Drye of The Stir highlighted racial issues with the episode, including the romantic pairing of Asian characters Mike Chang (Harry Shum, Jr., left) and Tina Cohen-Chang (Jenna Ushkowitz, right)

TV Guide's Matt Roush wrote that "Audition" was "far from [his] favorite episode", disliking the "cruelty and dirty tricks" employed by the characters, though he commented that "the moments that soar remind us why this is a genuine pop-culture phenom". James Poniewozik of Time called it a "solid" episode, one which was "neither awful nor amazing", but set up promising storylines for the season ahead. He felt there were no stand out musical performances, but commented, "it gave the season some emotional grounding [...] It showed us a Glee that's not working double-time to give us everything we want all at once, and that's pretty much what I want from it." John Doyle of The Globe and Mail wrote that, with "Audition", Glee had become formulaic, and asserted that "Glee fanatics won't be disappointed. The rest of us are."

In an overall positive review of the episode, Fred Topel of Hollywood News wrote that the opening scenes that addressed fan criticisms were a little too harsh on the show's fictional characters, having gone overboard to the point of offensiveness. He highlighted as a concern the "downright racist" scene ten minutes into the show between Rachel and Sunshine which he could have "done without". Meghan Carlson of BuddyTV also described Rachel's behavior in the aforementioned scene as "totally, patronizingly racist". Writing for The Stir, Brittany Drye asked "Is Glee racist?", and cited several moments in "Audition" which could be perceived as racist. She found the scene with Rachel screaming at Sunshine in the bathroom in broken English to be distasteful, and also highlighted the pairing of Tina and Mike (noting their shared surname, "Chang") and the joke of Jacob assuming they are a couple because they are both Asian. However, Drye speculated that in attempting "self-aware racism" the show was intentionally trying to point out the inanity of racist beliefs, and concluded that Glee's self-awareness in this matter was its saving grace.
