= Kampong Putat =

Village in Brunei

Kampong Putat Kampung Putat
- Village
- Location in Brunei
- Coordinates: 4°49′59″N 114°58′34″E
- Country: Brunei
- District: Brunei-Muara
- Mukim: Lumapas
- First settled: 19th century
- Named for: Barringtonia asiatica

Government
  - Village head: Zainol Mohamed

Area
  - Land: 783.70 ha (1,936.6 acres)

Population (2016)
  - Total: 364
  - Density: 46.4/km^{2} (120/sq mi)
- Time zone: UTC+8 (BNT)
- Postcode: BJ1324

Kampong Putat (Note: From the Malay name, lit. "Putat Village") (Malay: Kampung Putat) is a village located in Mukim Lumapas, in the south-east of Brunei–Muara District, Brunei. Situated about 75 kilometres (47 mi) from Bandar Seri Begawan by road and 15 kilometres by water, the village borders Kampong Kasat and spans an area of 783.70 hectares (1,936.6 acres). With a population of 364 in 2016, the residents of Kampong Putat are predominantly Malay and practice Islam.

== Etymology ==
According to the oral tradition of the residents of Kampong Putat, the name 'Putat' originates from a story about a resident of Kampong Ayer who got lost while searching for timber in the forest of Kampong Putat. When he tried to return, he became lost in the forest and took shelter under a tree. After several days without returning home, the residents of Kampong Ayer went in search of the missing person. When they found him, he was leaning against a putat (Barringtonia asiatica) tree. Over time, the village came to be known as Kampong Putat. It is also believed that Kampong Putat has existed since the 19th century.

== Economy ==
The traditional occupations of the village residents in the past were rice farming and rubber tapping. Starting in the 1970s, most of the village residents began working in the government and private sectors, following the development of infrastructure at that time.

One of the business owners from the Kampong Putat Village Consultative Council (MPK), Awang Haji Junggal, stated that in addition to teaching the children carpentry and how to make wood decorations, they are also taught to identify the types of wood that are appropriate for use as decorations because not all wood is suitable for this purpose. Producing items like the machete, sarong pemarang, spoon, gegawi, decorative tops, and more with the assistance of his kids. The products of his labor and their labor have been sold and purchased by both domestic and foreign tourists.

Some of the products produced by the village include the planting of herbal plants, which include White Pelibas, Yellow Pelibas, Black Turmeric, Tongkat Ali, Ambuk Sikubang and various other types of herbs produced in the village. The Yellow or White Pelibas which are used to treat food poisoning and urinary diseases are also planted. In addition, the production of various types of herbal oils such as Bidara Oil, Black Turmeric Oil, Red Betel Oil and various other types of oil consisting of herbal plants.

== Infrastructure ==
Changes and developments in Kampong Putat began in the 1970s, when telephone and electricity facilities were installed in the villagers' homes. The road has also undergone three phases of improvement: in the 1970s, the road was still made of gravel; in 1981, the road was upgraded with tarmac; and in 2010, the road was further improved to meet the needs of the local residents.

The village also received a police post, which was built in the 1970s, serving as a means of communication to prevent and reduce crime rates. Around the year 2000, the Customs Wharf, which was previously located in Bandar Seri Begawan, was relocated to the end of Kampong Putat. This wharf serves as a route for village residents travelling to Limbang District, Malaysia. It operates for the public from 6 a.m. to 6 pm

=== Education ===
In 1964, a temporary school was built through the communal efforts of the villagers. The villagers gathered to collect timber from the forest to construct a school with a thatched nipa palm roof. In 1981, the school building was replaced with a concrete structure, and the development of education proceeded smoothly following the system provided by government primary schools in Brunei. Meanwhile, the Putat Religious School was established in 1999. Before the construction of the religious school, students studied and attended classes at Putat Primary School, where the students were from Kampong Putat and Kampong Kasat.

=== Religion ===
The first mosque in Kampong Putat was built on 6 April 1982 and completed on 4 January 1983. It was officially opened on 28 February 1983, coinciding with the Friday prayers. The mosque was constructed on land granted by the government of Brunei, at a cost of $120,000. As the population grew, a second mosque was built in 2009 on the site of the original mosque. This new mosque can accommodate up to 700 worshippers. Facilities at the mosque include a library, kitchen, and more. The mosque also hosts various activities, including religious lectures, workshops, cemetery cleanups, and prayer sessions such as the Doa Arwah and Tahill gatherings, which have been held for over 25 years, organised by the village residents.

=== Miscellaneous ===
The Kampong Putat Herbal Recreation Park (Taman Rekreasi Herba Kampung Putat), established through community collaboration as part of the "One Village One Product" initiative, serves as a leisure and educational space featuring over 80 types of medicinal herbs. Opened in March 2010 by Suyoi Osman, it includes amenities such as a parking area, small hall, stage, toilets, and pathways leading to herb gardens. The park is a popular destination for both local and international visitors, offering various herbs that are believed to have healing properties. Entrance costs $5.00, with additional fees for food and traditional performances, and the proceeds support community activities.
