= Britney/Brittany =

- Glee episode
- Episode no.: Season 2 Episode 2
- Directed by: Ryan Murphy
- Written by: Ryan Murphy
- Production code: 2ARC02
- Original air date: September 28, 2010

Guest appearances
- John Stamos as Carl Howell; Britney Spears as herself; Iqbal Theba as Principal Figgins; Dot-Marie Jones as Shannon Beiste; Harry Shum Jr. as Mike Chang; Josh Sussman as Jacob Ben Israel; Max Adler as Dave Karofsky; James Earl as Azimio; Ashley Fink as Lauren Zizes; Lauren Potter as Becky Jackson

Episode chronology
← Previous "Audition"	Next → "Grilled Cheesus"
- Glee season 2

"Britney/Brittany" is the second episode of the second season of the American television series Glee, and the twenty-fourth episode overall. Written and directed by series creator Ryan Murphy, it premiered on the Fox network on September 28, 2010, and pays tribute to Britney Spears. Glee club member Brittany S. Pierce (Heather Morris) experiences an anesthesia-induced hallucination in which she recreates iconic Spears moments, and comes to self-realization, and several club members follow suit. Co-captains Rachel (Lea Michele) and Finn (Cory Monteith) experience difficulties in their relationship, and club director Will Schuester (Matthew Morrison) becomes jealous of guidance counselor Emma Pillsbury's (Jayma Mays) new boyfriend, Dr. Carl Howell (John Stamos).

Following the first season episode "The Power of Madonna", which served as an homage to Madonna, Murphy planned two tribute episodes for Glee's second season, of which "Britney/Brittany" is the first. He was approached by Spears about using her songs, and deemed her one of the most important female musicians of the decade, having inspired many of the show's young cast to pursue musical careers. Spears makes several cameos in the episode, appearing in the students' dream sequences. "Britney/Brittany" was also intended as a showcase for Morris, whose character was originally a background character on the show, but was promoted to a series regular after her character proved to be a fan favorite.

The episode features seven musical performances, six of which were released as singles. It was watched by 13.51 million American viewers, Glee's third largest audience ever, and attracted mixed reviews from critics. Emily VanDerWerff of The A.V. Club criticized its slightness of plot and incongruous musical numbers. However, James Poniewozik of Time praised the episode for embracing its fantasy nature; Bobby Hankinson of the Houston Chronicle brought up similar thoughts, therefore calling the episode brilliant. Entertainment Weekly's Tim Stack was dismayed by the close recreations of Spears videos, preferring Glee's more original interpretations of its cover versions, yet MTV's Aly Semigran felt that the performance of "I'm a Slave 4 U" was one of the best sequences in the show's history. Michele's rendition of "...Baby One More Time" attracted negative reviews, though her performance of Paramore's "The Only Exception" was generally well received. Spears' cameo received mixed reviews, with even those critics who received it favorably saying that it was better that she did not appear for longer. Morris' performance attracted critical praise, particularly for her dancing skills.

== Plot ==
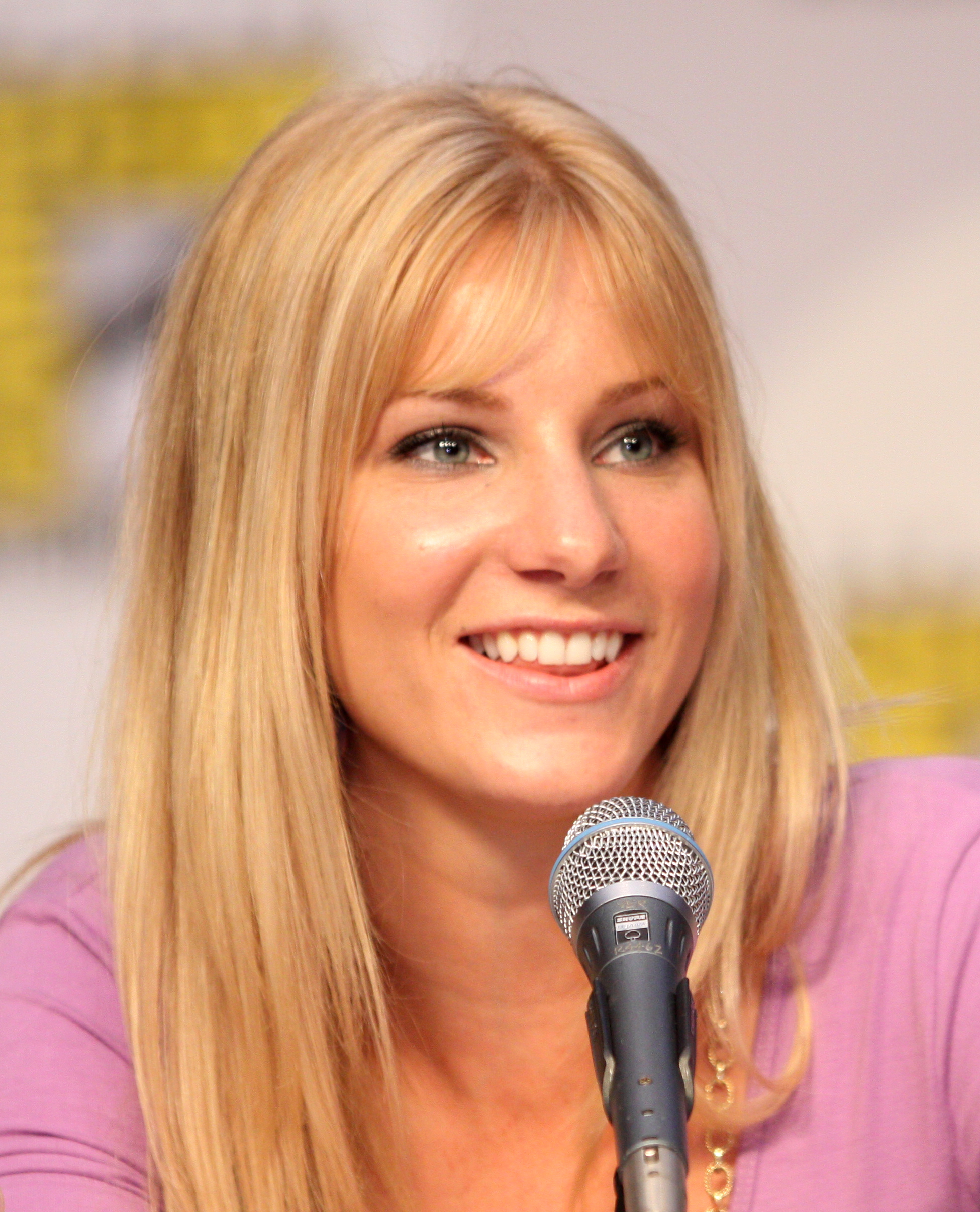
"Britney/Brittany" is the first Glee episode in which Heather Morris (pictured) is featured singing a solo performance.

Glee club director Will Schuester (Matthew Morrison) attempts to set New Directions an easy listening adult contemporary assignment, but Kurt (Chris Colfer) informs them there is a Facebook group petitioning the club to perform a Britney Spears number at the McKinley High homecoming assembly. Will refuses, stating that Spears is a bad role model. He is supported by club member Brittany (Heather Morris), who reveals that her full name is Brittany Susan Pierce (calling herself Brittany Spierce) and as such she has always been dismayed that she will never be as successful as the similarly named pop star.

Will then discusses Spears with school guidance counselor Emma Pillsbury (Jayma Mays). While in her office, he meets her new boyfriend, dentist Carl Howell (John Stamos), who offers to talk to the glee club about dental hygiene. A plaque test reveals that Brittany, Rachel (Lea Michele) and Artie (Kevin McHale) all require dental work. When Brittany is put under general anesthesia so Carl can fill her cavities, she experiences a hallucination in which she performs Spears' "I'm a Slave 4 U". She later returns to Carl's practice with her friend Santana (Naya Rivera) and they share a hallucination in which they duet on "Me Against the Music". Brittany feels empowered by the encounter, and begins to act more assertively in glee club.

Rachel feels threatened by her boyfriend Finn's (Cory Monteith) desire to re-join the school football team, fearing that their relationship will not work if he becomes popular again. After visiting the dentist and experiencing her own hallucination, in which she performs "...Baby One More Time", Rachel begins dressing more provocatively. Her new look is received positively and cheerleading coach Sue Sylvester (Jane Lynch) finds school blogger Jacob Ben Israel (Josh Sussman) masturbating to a video of Rachel in the library. Rachel relents and encourages Finn to re-join the team. Artie's dental visit results in a hallucination of "Stronger" in which he is also a member of the football team. Football coach Shannon Beiste (Dot-Marie Jones) accepts both Finn and Artie, despite the fact Artie is in a wheelchair. Rachel becomes jealous of the attention Finn is receiving now that he is back on the team and to test Finn's fidelity, she has his ex-girlfriend Quinn (Dianna Agron) attempt to seduce him. She is relieved when Finn turns Quinn down, and sings Paramore's "The Only Exception" to him in apology.

Advised by Emma to relax, Will learns that Carl recently purchased a new Chevrolet Corvette and buys one for himself. He is confronted by his ex-wife Terri (Jessalyn Gilsig), who insists that he return it and cease wasting their savings. Seeing the positive effect Spears has had on the glee club members, Will relents and allows them to perform a Bob Fosse-inspired rendition of "Toxic" at the homecoming assembly, joining them on stage in an effort to impress Emma. When multiple students, including Jacob and Lauren Zizes (Ashley Fink), become sexually aroused by the performance, Sue sets off the fire alarm and has the student body evacuate the auditorium. She later threatens to sue Will after being injured in the stampede. Emma tells Will to stop trying to be someone he is not, and he returns his new car. He also tells the club they will not be performing any more Spears numbers.

== Production ==
During the first season of Glee, the show paid tribute to Madonna with the episode "The Power of Madonna". Murphy planned two tribute episodes for the second season: "Britney/Brittany", and a second, originally planned to air after Super Bowl XLV in February 2011. Many of the show's young cast members were inspired to pursue musical careers by Spears. Murphy stated that it was Spears' idea for Glee to use her songs, explaining: "I think she loves what the show's about, paying tribute to pop culture in a very loving, respectful, kind way. She responded to that." He described Spears as "arguably the most important female [musician] other than Lady Gaga in the last 10 years," commenting that the episode is not only concerned with her music, but also her public image.

In May 2010, Morrison told US Weekly that he hoped no Spears songs would be performed on Glee. Based on his comments, Murphy had Morrison's character Will spend the episode resisting his students' desire to perform her songs. Will's storyline featuring a Chevrolet Corvette involved product placement for the Chevrolet division of General Motors, who became an advertiser and event sponsor for Glee prior to its 2009 launch.

The cast received their scripts for the episode on July 26, 2010, and Murphy began directing it on August 2, 2010. Spears filmed her guest starring scenes on August 18 and 19, 2010. Murphy commented that: "At the heart of it, it's a show designed to show off the skills of Heather Morris". Prior to appearing in Glee, Morris was a back-up dancer for Beyoncé. She was originally hired as a choreographer to teach cast members Colfer and Jenna Ushkowitz the "Single Ladies" dance. A week later, she was cast as cheerleader Brittany. Morris had a recurring role throughout the first season, and was promoted to a series regular for season two. At the 2010 Television Critics Association Summer Press Tour, Murphy stated that Brittany would have "big storylines" in the new season, as viewers want to know more about her.

Stamos makes his first Glee appearance in "Britney/Brittany" playing Carl Howell, a dentist and Emma's love-interest. Other recurring characters who appear in the episode are glee club member Mike Chang (Harry Shum, Jr.), Principal Figgins (Iqbal Theba), Coach Shannon Beiste (Jones), school reporter Jacob Ben Israel (Sussman), cheerleader Becky Jackson (Lauren Potter), school bullies Dave Karofsky (Max Adler) and Azimio (James Earl) and student Lauren Zizes (Fink). So You Think You Can Dance contestant Mark Kanemura appears as a backing dancer.

== Music ==
The episode featured cover versions of five Spears songs, two of which were performed by Morris. "Stronger", "...Baby One More Time", "Toxic", "I'm a Slave 4 U", and "Me Against the Music" (featuring Madonna) were covered. "The Only Exception" by Paramore and "Sailing" by Christopher Cross were also performed. All songs except "Sailing" were released as singles, available for download, and all songs except "I'm a Slave 4 U", "...Baby One More Time", and "Sailing" are included on the album Glee: The Music, Volume 4. Both Spears and Paramore's Hayley Williams praised the episode via the social networking website Twitter, approving of the use of their songs. All singles managed to chart on the Billboard Hot 100, selling 406,000 downloads collectively. The cast's cover of "Toxic" charted as the highest of the six, at number sixteen with 109,000 downloads.

Tim Stack of Entertainment Weekly felt that the performances of "I'm a Slave 4 U" and "Me Against the Music" fell flat, opining that Glee's best musical numbers are the ones which twist, rather than imitate the original versions. Though he praised Morris' dancing, he felt the episode revealed her to be "not a standout vocalist". Conversely, Erica Futterman of Rolling Stone enjoyed the direct recreations of iconic Spears moments in "I'm a Slave 4 U", and MTV's Aly Semigran called it one of the best sequences in the show's history. Futterman was also impressed by the "Me Against the Music" recreation, highlighting the way it played on the ambiguous Brittany/Santana relationship, complimenting Morris' dancing and Rivera's vocals.

Raymund Flandez of The Wall Street Journal criticized Michele's rendition of "...Baby One More Time", writing, "Her earnestness, her adoring look and her intelligent voice bumps up against the breathless sound of breathy pop. It's like a YouTube spoof, an opera singer trying to make a barmaid's ditty on Oktoberfest more appealing—by shedding her clothes." Futterman was left wanting by the number, feeling that "the tune lost all of its scandalous sexuality with Rachel's octaves-higher singing".

Stack deemed "Stronger" his favorite performance of the episode, as well as the best incorporation of Spears' music, as the song served Artie's storyline. He praised the increased use of McHale as a vocalist in the second season, enjoying his soulful voice. Flandez also enjoyed "Stronger", appreciating the twist of having males sing a feminist empowerment song. Semigran wrote that it was "Toxic" which provided the best Spears cover of the episode, commenting that it "took on its own fresh sound all while honoring the original". She disapproved of "The Only Exception" as the closing song, feeling that the use of another Spears song such as "Everytime" would have been more appropriate. However, Flandez called Michele's Paramore rendition "suitably earnest", Futterman described it as "gorgeous and tender", and Stack felt it served as a "nice, emotional capper" to the episode.

== Ratings ==
During its original broadcast, "Britney/Brittany" was watched by 13.51 million American viewers. It drew Glee's second largest audience to date behind "Hell-O", which was watched by 13.66 million viewers in April 2010, following a four-month hiatus. Viewership was up 1.06 million over the previous episode, "Audition", 0.5 million over the Madonna tribute episode "The Power of Madonna", and 2.1 million over the Lady Gaga-themed episode "Theatricality". The episode attained Glee's series high rating to date in the 18–49 demographic, with a 5.9/17 Nielsen rating/share—it was subsequently beaten by "The Sue Sylvester Shuffle", which aired on February 6, 2011, immediately following the Super Bowl, and was watched by 26.8 million viewers and garnered an 11.1/29 rating/share—also making it the highest-rated show on the night of broadcast. "Britney/Brittany" was Fox's highest-rated live-action comedy episode of the fall in eight years among adults 18–49, and nine years among total viewers. It was the first time in seventeen years that the highest-rated entertainment show of premiere week grew in its second week among adults 18–49 and total viewers. In Canada, the episode was the most-watched show of the night, attaining 2.4 million viewers. In the 18–49 demographic, it was up 18% on "Audition", and outperformed No Ordinary Family, its closest competitor in the 8:00 p.m. timeslot, by 73%. In Australia, the episode was watched by 1.171 million viewers, making Glee the seventh most-watched show of the night. In the UK, the episode was watched by 3.068 million viewers (2.634 million on E4, and 451,000 on E4+1), becoming the most-watched show on E4 and E4 +1 for the week, and the most-watched show on cable for the week, as well as the most-watched episode of the series at the time, and the first episode of the entire series to draw over 3 million viewers.

== Critical response ==
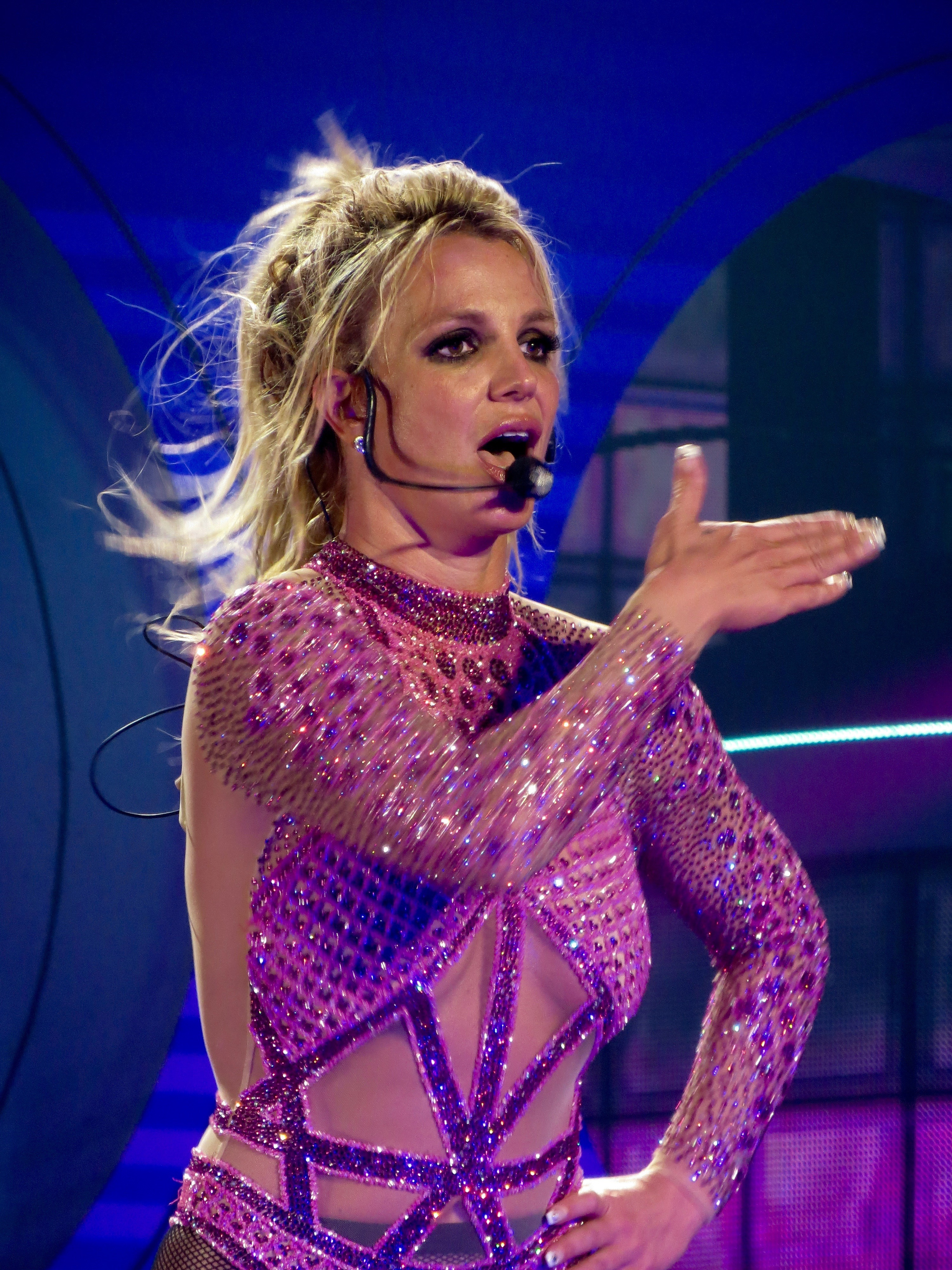
The cameo appearances by Britney Spears (pictured) received mixed to negative reviews from critics.

"Britney/Brittany" received mixed reviews from critics. Emily VanDerWerff of The A.V. Club graded the episode "D+", commenting that it was "what people who say Glee is awful are talking about when they say Glee is awful". She criticized the lack of plot and coherence in the musical numbers, feeling that storyline and character arcs were ignored in favor of showcasing Spears covers. Stack described the episode as a "monumental television event"; however, he also expressed his lingering sense of "slight disappointment". While he enjoyed the episode overall, Stack wrote that Spears' songs felt forced into the storyline, and that the episode was neither as iconic nor as exhilarating as Glee's Madonna tribute. The Parents Television Council slammed the episode, accusing the presentation of Spears as a "symbol of empowerment and self-esteem" problematic, observing that the young audience "basically witnessed an endorsement of narcotics abuse, public masturbation, and school-sanctioned burlesque".

James Poniewozik of Time, who disliked the Madonna episode, was "pleasantly surprised" by "Britney/Brittany". He deemed it one of the funniest and most entertaining episodes of the series, crediting Morris' performance and the "fortunately limited" Spears cameos. Responding to criticism of the episode, Poniewozik conceded that the storylines were slender and Spears remakes dominated the episode, however felt that unlike "The Power of Madonna", it worked because "it owned its slightness: it kept the videos (and Britney's appearances) where they belonged as fantasy". Bobby Hankinson of the Houston Chronicle described the episode as brilliant, and felt that presenting the Spears performances as a series of unrelated hallucinations was "an inspired choice". IGN's Robert Canning rated "Britney/Brittany" 8/10, signifying an "Impressive" episode. He described it as fun, but close to being "too much of a gimmick", with incongruous song choices.

VanDerWerff deemed Spears' cameo "totally useless", criticizing the singer's "flat, listless dialogue". Lisa de Moraes of The Washington Post graded her cameo a "C", commenting "at least she didn't have to try to be funny" as in her How I Met Your Mother guest-spot. Flandez was disappointed that Spears did not appear for longer, yet he concluded that given the acting demonstrated in her 2002 film Crossroads, it was better that the pop star did not. Conversely, Jenna Mullins of E! Online appreciated the fact that Spears did not appear as a background character, writing that she is "best when she is playing herself", Stack felt her appearances were well-handled, "with a nice level of restraint", and Canning felt they were kept to a "perfect minimum".

Morris' performance attracted critical praise, with de Moraes calling "Britney/Brittany" a "great showcase" for the actress, praising her "spectacular dance moves" and "deadpan flare". In her otherwise negative review, VanDerWerff deemed Morris "hysterical throughout" and the cast's best dancer. She stated, "Murphy seems intent on running this character into the ground, but Morris isn't going to have her stop being funny without a fight." Mullins observed, "When Ryan Murphy said this episode was a celebration of Heather, he wasn't kidding", commending her musical performances. Canning was initially concerned that the episode would diminish Morris' appeal by elevating her from a background role, but was ultimately pleased that it managed to retain her "fan favorite" secondary character status.
