= Malin Kundang =

Indonesian folk figure

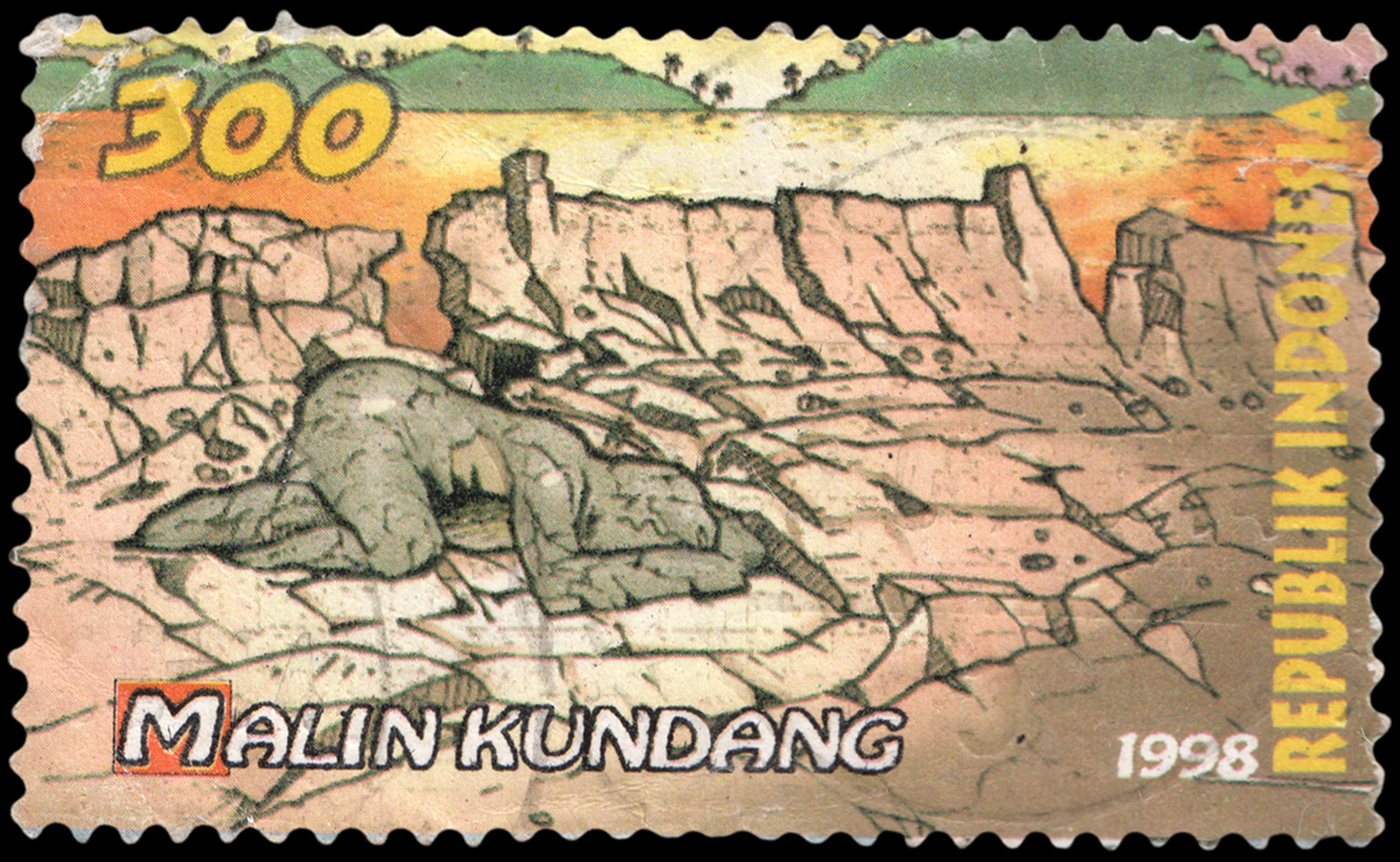
- The legend of Malin Kundang, as depicted on a 1998 Indonesian stamp

Folk tale
- Name: Malin Kundang
- Mythology: Minangkabau
- Country: Indonesia
- Region: Western Sumatra

Malin Kundang is a popular folktale in Indonesian folklore that originated in the province of West Sumatra. The folktale tells of an ungrateful son named Malin Kundang and centers around the themes of disobedience and retribution that turned him into stone. Aside from this folktale, there are several other similar variations across South East Asia including Si Tanggang and Nakhoda Manis that originated in Malaysia and Brunei.

== History ==
The legend of Malin Kundang stems from the people of Minangkabau, who live in the highlands of West Sumatra, Indonesia. Minangkabau is the largest ethnic group on the island and is home to many cultural folktales, with Malin Kundang being one of them. Aside from the famous folktale, other legends that originated from the Minangkabau people include The Legend of the White Siamang and The Janiah River Magic Fish. These stories are passed down from generation to generation and continue to exist through orality.

In Minangkabau culture, the socio-cultural values and beliefs that are used as a guideline for the community are called local wisdom. These values come in many forms, including folktales, songs, and performances. The story incorporates traditional values that the people of Minangkabau uphold, making the story an integral part of Minangkabau folktales and contributing to its culture. The moral lessons and deeper interpretation of Malin Kundang are the reflection of the values in Minangkabau's previous and current society. It is a way of preserving their tradition and promoting these values to the current and future generations of the Minangkabau people.

== Plot ==
Long ago, there lived a boy named Malin Kundang. He lived with his mother in a fishing village on a beach near Padang. Malin grew up to be an intelligent teen and was greatly loved by his mother. However, they lived in poverty, as fishing was their only source of income. He dreamed of venturing out of the village to find a better life. One day, Malin noticed a ship that was anchored at the beach's pier. He saw this as an opportunity and begged his mother to let him go to the city. However, his mother was very reluctant, as she feared that something might happen to him. She finally agreed and told him to remember her and return to the village. She gave him packs of rice for food and said her goodbyes as he boarded the ship and left.

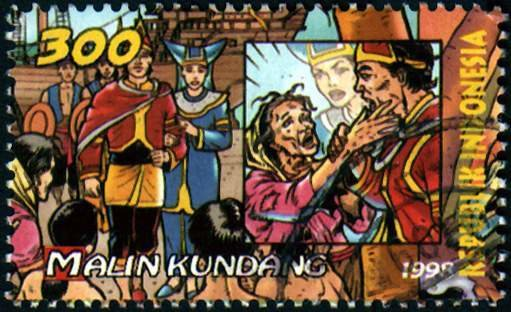
1998 Indonesian stamp illustrating the interaction between Malin Kundang and his mother after he became wealthy

Every morning, she stood at the edge of the pier and stared at the ocean as she waited for her son's return. She prayed for months for his safety and return home. Several years passed without her hearing from him. However, she always anticipated his arrival. One day, a luxurious ship docked at the pier. Curious, the villagers gathered. A man and a woman dressed in lavish clothes disembarked from the ship. Seeing that it is her long-lost son, she immediately went to him and hugged him tight. Instead of accepting her embrace, he forcefully pried himself loose and pushed her to the ground. He felt ashamed of his mother's ragged and scruffy clothes. His wife looked down on her appearance and asked who she was to Malin. Fearful of what his wife might think, he refused to acknowledge her as his mother. The couple went back to the ship and sailed away.

The heartbroken mother prayed for the man's actions to be forgiven if he was not her son and prayed for God's justice if he was. Shortly after, a storm arose. A bolt of lightning struck Malin's ship, destroying it. The wreckage was scattered around the beach the morning after. Amidst the pieces of the ship was a human-shaped boulder that was believed to be Malin Kundang in a kneeling position. He was cursed and turned into a stone because of his behavior towards his mother.

The folktale conveys a moral lesson, emphasizing the importance of respect and gratitude towards one's parents. It particularly focuses on the consequences and repercussions of arrogance and greed. Despite all the struggles that he and his mother overcame and her selfless acts of kindness towards him, Malin chose to deny his humble origins. Thus, he had to reap the consequences.

== The Stone of Malin Kundang ==
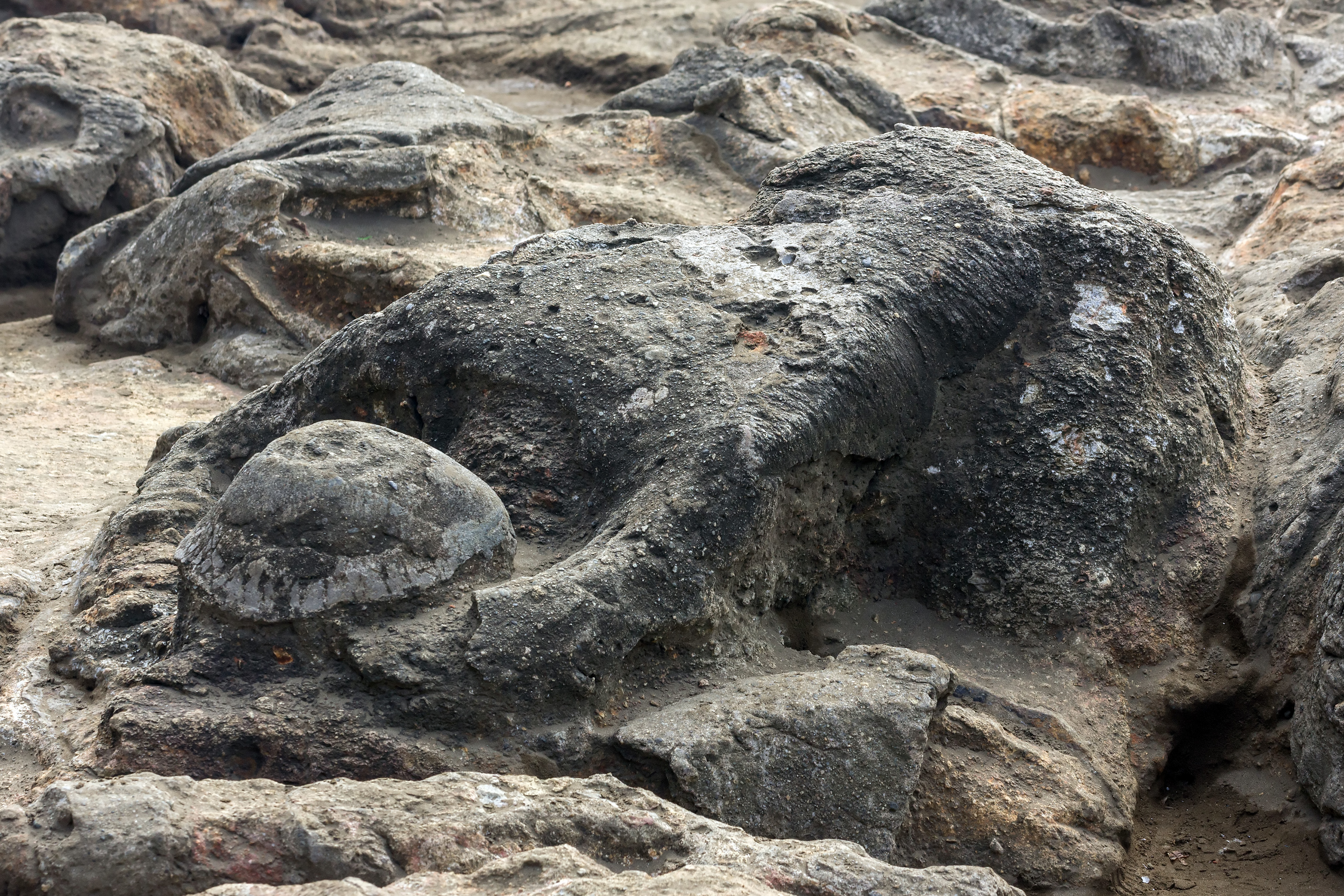
Malin Kundang rock formation

The story of Malin Kundang's stone in the folktale inspired the creation of the rock formation known as Batu Malin Kundang. The stone is an artificial artifact that was created in the 1980s by Dasril Bayras and Ibenzani Usman. The setting of the story is based on an actual beach located near Padang called Air Manis (Sweet Water) Beach. Therefore, the artifact can be found on this beach.

Similar to the story, the stone depicts Malin Kundang in a kneeling position, illustrating him begging for forgiveness. The waves that splash into the rock emit a blaring sound that is often associated with the sounds of crying.

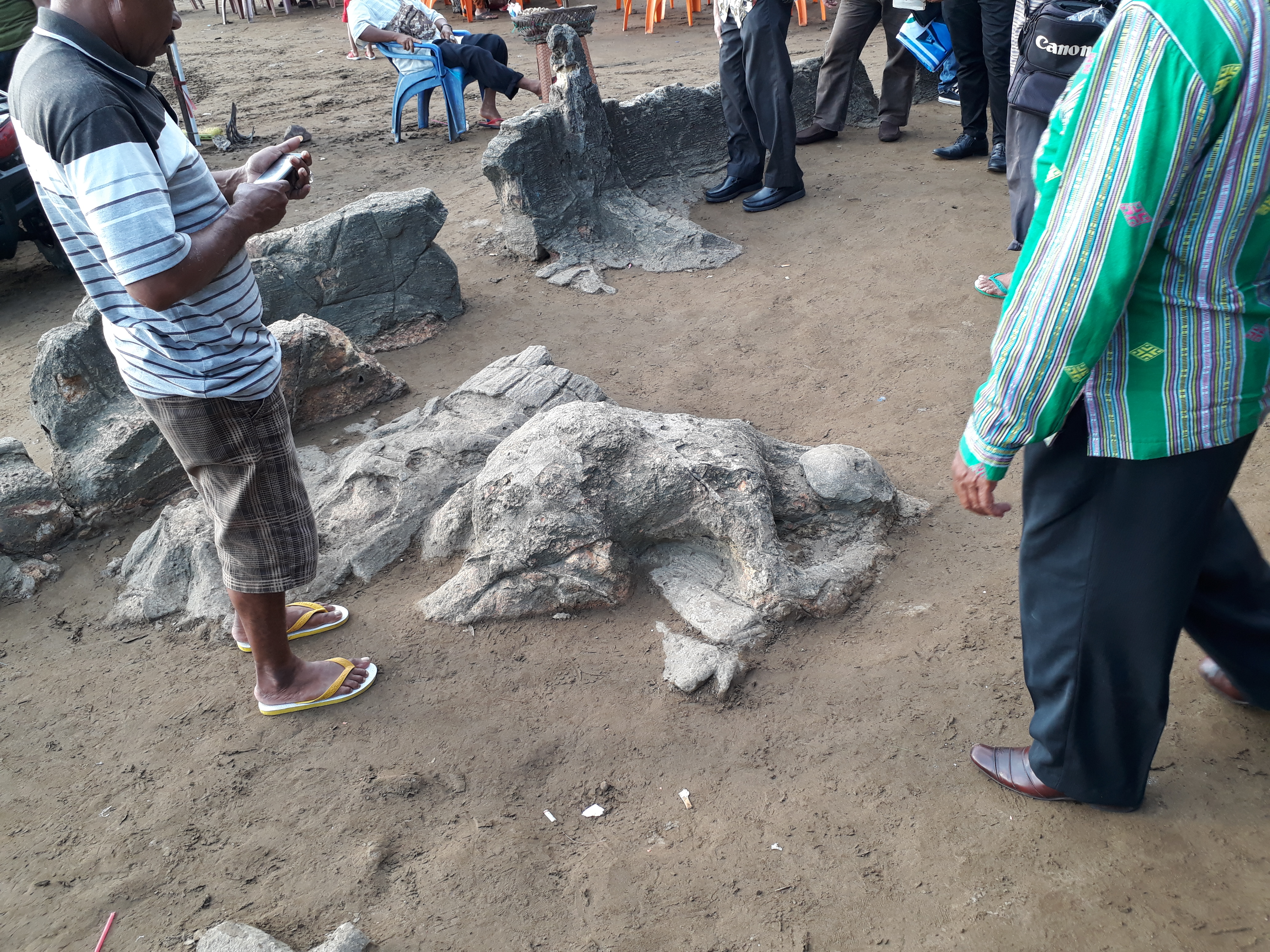
Malin Kundang Stone tourist attraction at Air Manis Beach

Aside from Malin Kundang's stone, several artificial rock formations near the stone are shaped to represent fragments and wreckage of the ship that also turned to stone. These additional rock formations are created to resemble typical supplies and equipment that sailors bring in a ship, such as ropes and wooden barrels.

The creation of Batu Malin Kundang and its association with the folktale popularized the Air Manis Beach, making it a popular tourist attraction in Padang. Similarly, the stone led to more recognition for the traditional folktale legend.

== Variations ==
=== Brunei ===
In Brunei, there is a variation of the Malin Kundang folktale that is called Nakhoda Manis. The story tells of a son named Manis who is raised by a wealthy widow and lived in a village called Kampong Ayer. His mother amassed her riches through the death of his father and hoped to pass down their great wealth to Manis when he got older. From an early age, his future was laid out for him and he was taught to behave like other noble sons. However, he had a different future in mind and had ambitions of his own. He planned on traveling to the city of Sulu. Although his mother was deeply saddened by his plans, she couldn't stop him from doing what he wanted to do.

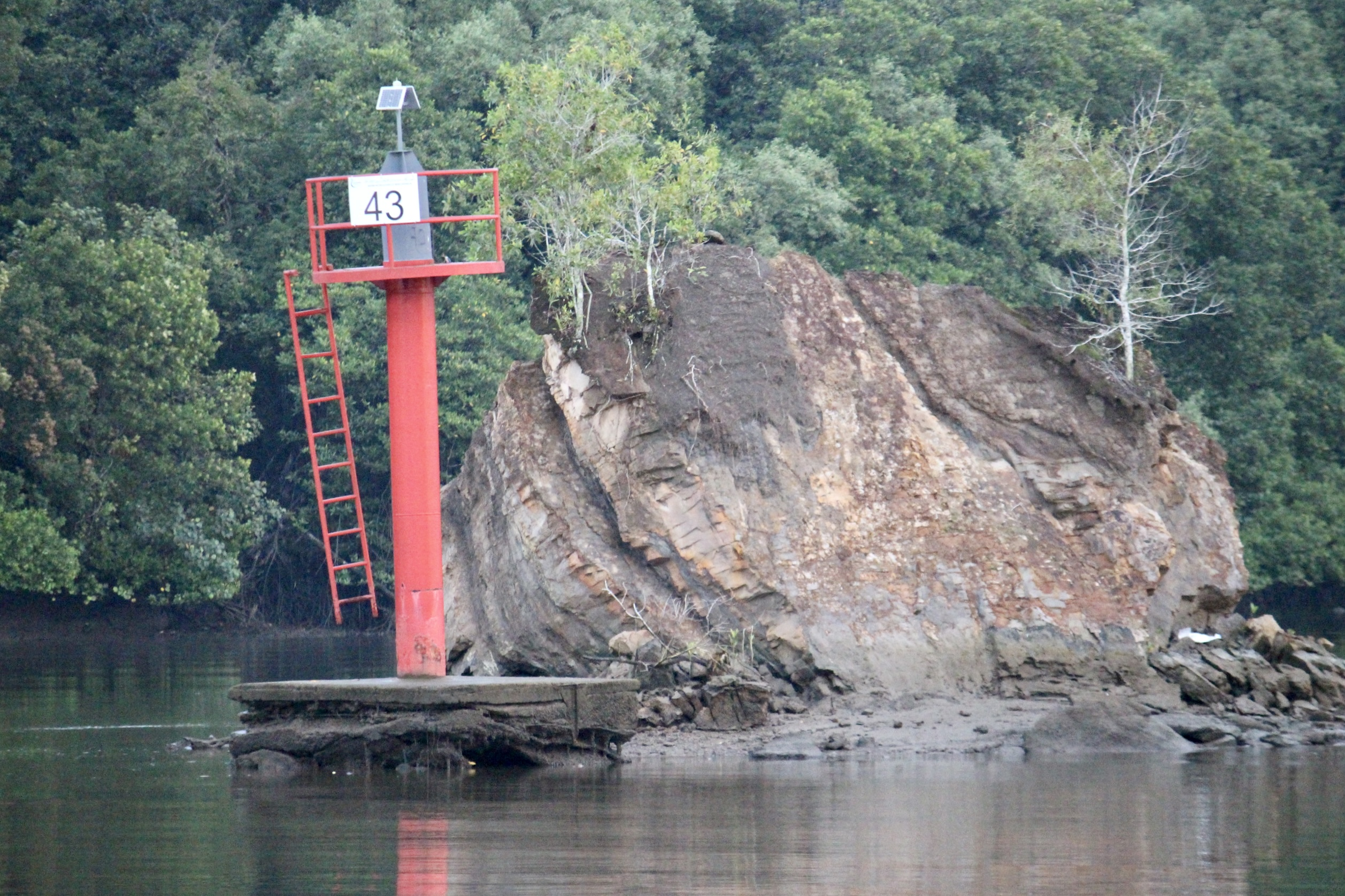
The Jong Batu resembles a ship being capsized and sticking out of the water

She prayed for him every day for decades following his departure and spent all her riches in these prayers, hoping that a higher power would bring her son home safely. The continuous prayers and visits to the mosque led her to poverty. As she was paddling in the Brunei river one day, she saw a large and magnificent-looking boat approaching. She was ecstatic when she realized that it was her son and immediately called out to him from her tiny boat. He was very happy hearing his mother's voice from a distance coming closer and closer. However, he was shocked to see a frail, old woman dressed in peasant clothes. Ashamed, he ordered his crew to push her boat away. His mother was shattered to see her son acting like this. She painstakingly cursed him, and a storm came suddenly, capsizing his ship.

A rocky outcrop called Jong Batu can be seen in the middle of Brunei River. It resembles a ship sticking out of the water and is most often associated with the Brunei folktale.

=== Malaysia ===
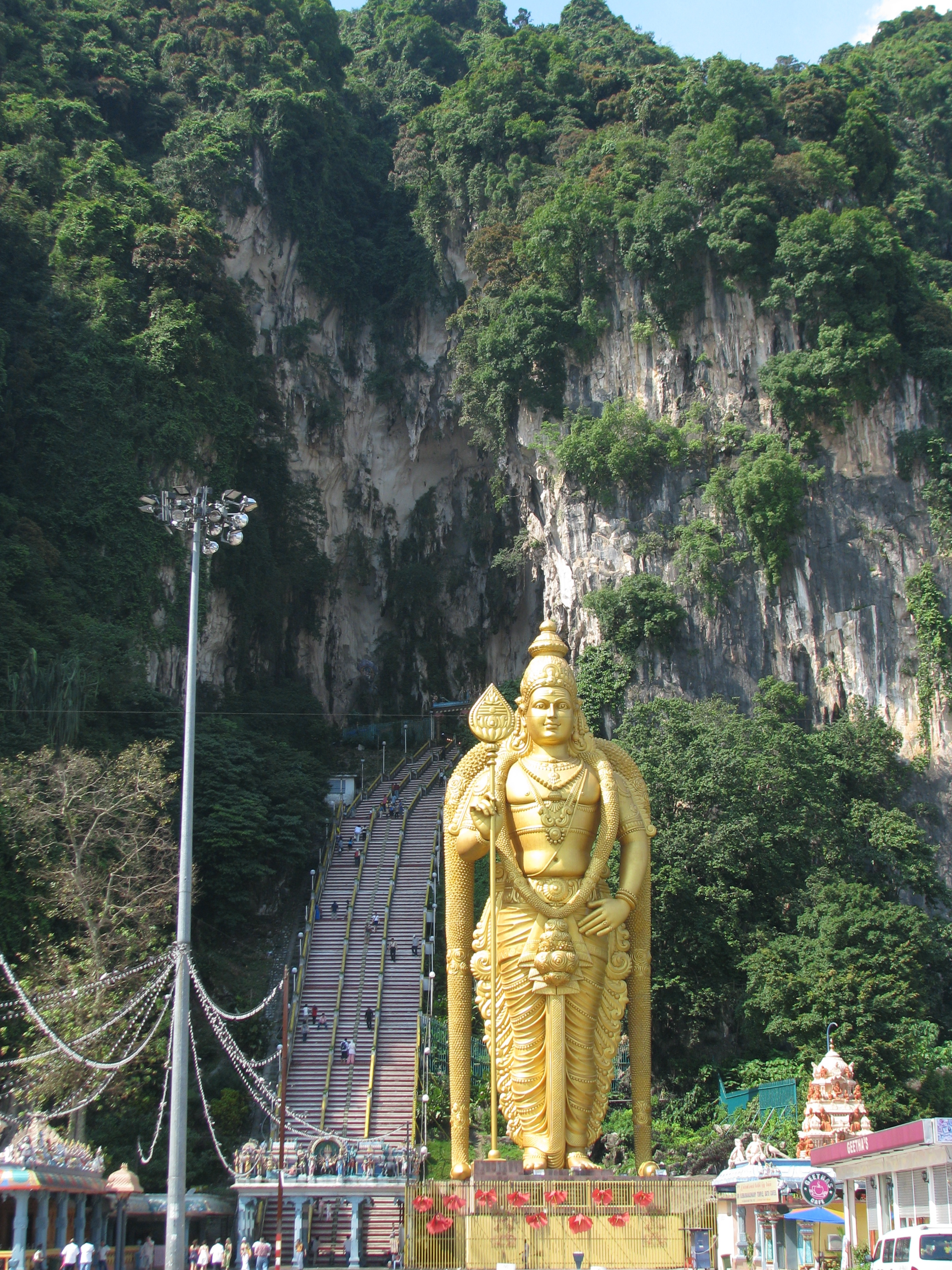
Batu Caves

There is another similar variation of the folktale in Malaysia known as Si Tanggang. The story tells of a son named Si Tanggang who lived in a fishing village with his mother and father. Since his father is a poor fisherman, they did not have a lot of money and lived a humble life. However, Tanggang have always dreamed of traveling outside his hometown to be rich. One day, he saw a ship that was docked in the pier of the village and went to the ship in hopes of boarding it. He talked to the captain and was allowed to sail with his crew. His parents were reluctant about letting their son go. However, he was very adamant and was eventually allowed to travel. He sailed across many countries and married a princess.

One day, the villagers saw a big ship, and the news of the captain being Tanggang immediately spread to his parents. Excited to see their son, they immediately paddled towards the ship as they called out to Tanggang. As soon as he saw their appearance, Tanggang pretended to be unaware of who they were and denied any relationship they had. He rudely asked them to go away, and they rowed away with great sorrow. When they arrived back, his mother stretched out her hands to the sky and cried for Tanggang to be punished. The sky immediately went dark, and the ship started rocking violently. Tanggang shouted and begged for forgiveness, but it was too late. Tanggang, his wife, and his crew all turned into stone.

A limestone formation known as Batu Caves is a popular tourist attraction in Gombak, Selangor, Malaysia, just north of Kuala Lumpur, and was originally known as Kapal Tanggang (Ship of Tanggang) from the folktale.

== Popular culture ==
Due to the folktale's widespread popularity, the legend of Malin Kundang has become the inspiration and foundation for various popular culture adaptations, such as films, musicals, and performances.

- Si Tanggang is a 1961 film starring Jins Shamsuddin.
- Malin Kundang is a 1971 Indonesian film that was directed by D. Djajakusuma and adapted from the folktale. Although the basis and premise of the movie was largely taken from the folktale, the film included additional aspects that were not present in the original folktale, such as new characters.
- The Legend of Malin Kundang is a play that was performed in Orlando, Florida, at the Dr. Phillips Center for Performing Arts. The play features and makes use of traditional Indonesian musical instruments called angklung.
- #MusikalDiRumahAja is a musical web series that focuses on Indonesian folktales. The first episode of the series featured the Malin Kundang folktale.
- Malin Kundang is an Indonesian soap opera that was released in 2005. The show was produced by MD Entertainment and released by SCTV. It takes on a moderate spin from the folktale and aired two seasons, with the second season focusing on the daughter of Malin Kundang.
- The Travel Journals of Si Tenggang II, a 1979 autobiographic, is produced by Malaysian laureate Muhammad Haji Salleh and uses the story as a metaphor for the general experience of moving away from one's cultural roots.
- Si Tanggang (Astro) is a 2009 Malaysian documentary chronicling the origins of the legend.

== See also ==
- Culture of Indonesia
- Indonesian folklore
- Bawang Merah Bawang Putih
- Timun Mas
- Filial piety
