= Kampong Lupak Luas =

Lupak Luas Kampung Lupak Luas
- Village
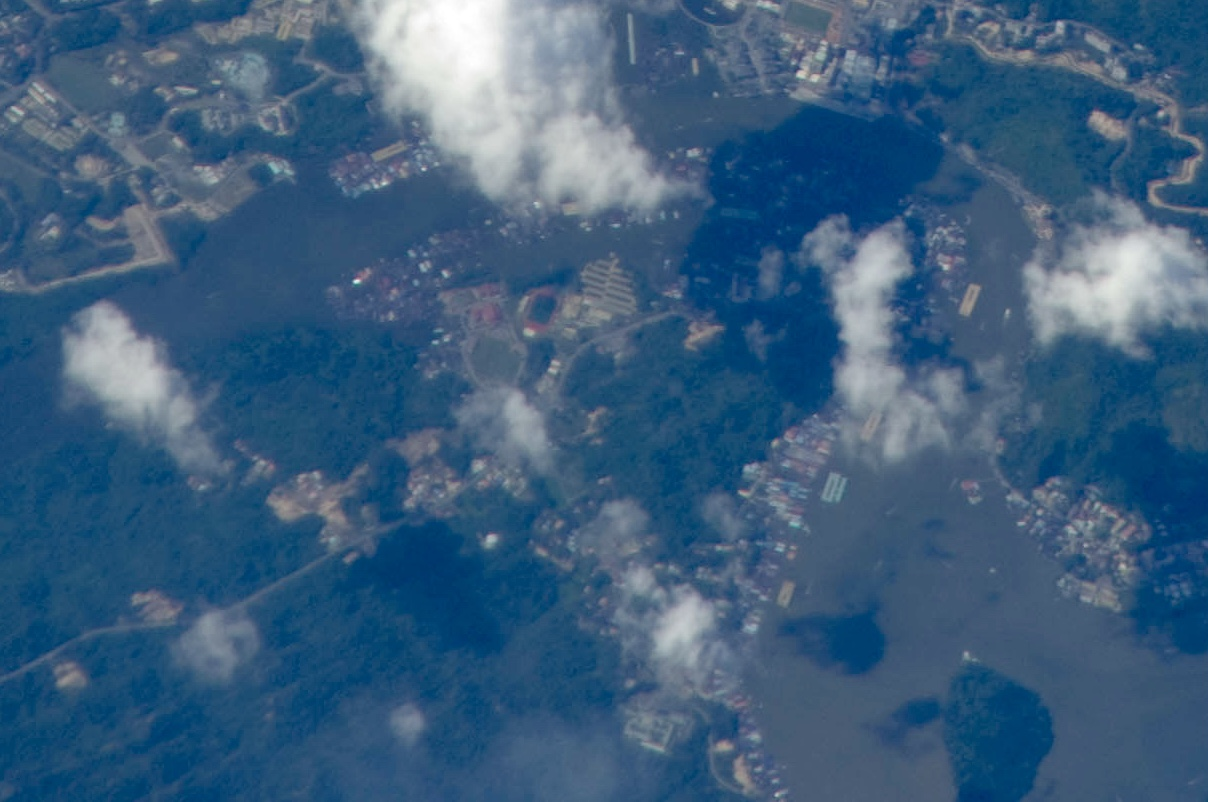
- Lupas Luas on the foreground.

- Location in Brunei
- Coordinates: 4°52′11″N 114°56′26″E
- Country: Brunei
- District: Brunei-Muara
- Mukim: Lumapas

Government
  - Village head: Suhaili Moktar
- Postcode: BJ2524

Kampong Lupak Luas (Malay: Kampung Lupak Luas) or simply known as Lupak Luas, is a village-level subdivision of Lumapas, a mukim (subdistrict) of Brunei-Muara District, Brunei. The postcode for the village is BJ2524.

== Name ==
Kampong Lupak Luas comes from the Malay name which translates as 'Lupak Luas Village'.

== Transportation ==
=== Land ===
The village is connected by road named Jalan Sungai Assam.

== Infrastructure ==
A side path built on their own small branch of the Brunei River behind the bigger Kampong Burong Pingai Ayer, there are about a dozen water village dwellings in 2011.

The village has a Chinese cemetery located on a private land (Lot 118, EDR 1267), which was to be gazetted as a cemetery that is not Islamic, overseen by the district government, and does not need tomb excavation or relocation in 2023. In addition to this, an Islamic cemetery also sits in the village.

The jogging track on Lupak Hill (Bukit Lupak) was finished on 25 May 2014, and it is now open for use.
