= Saeh Hill =

Hill in Brunei-Muara District, Brunei

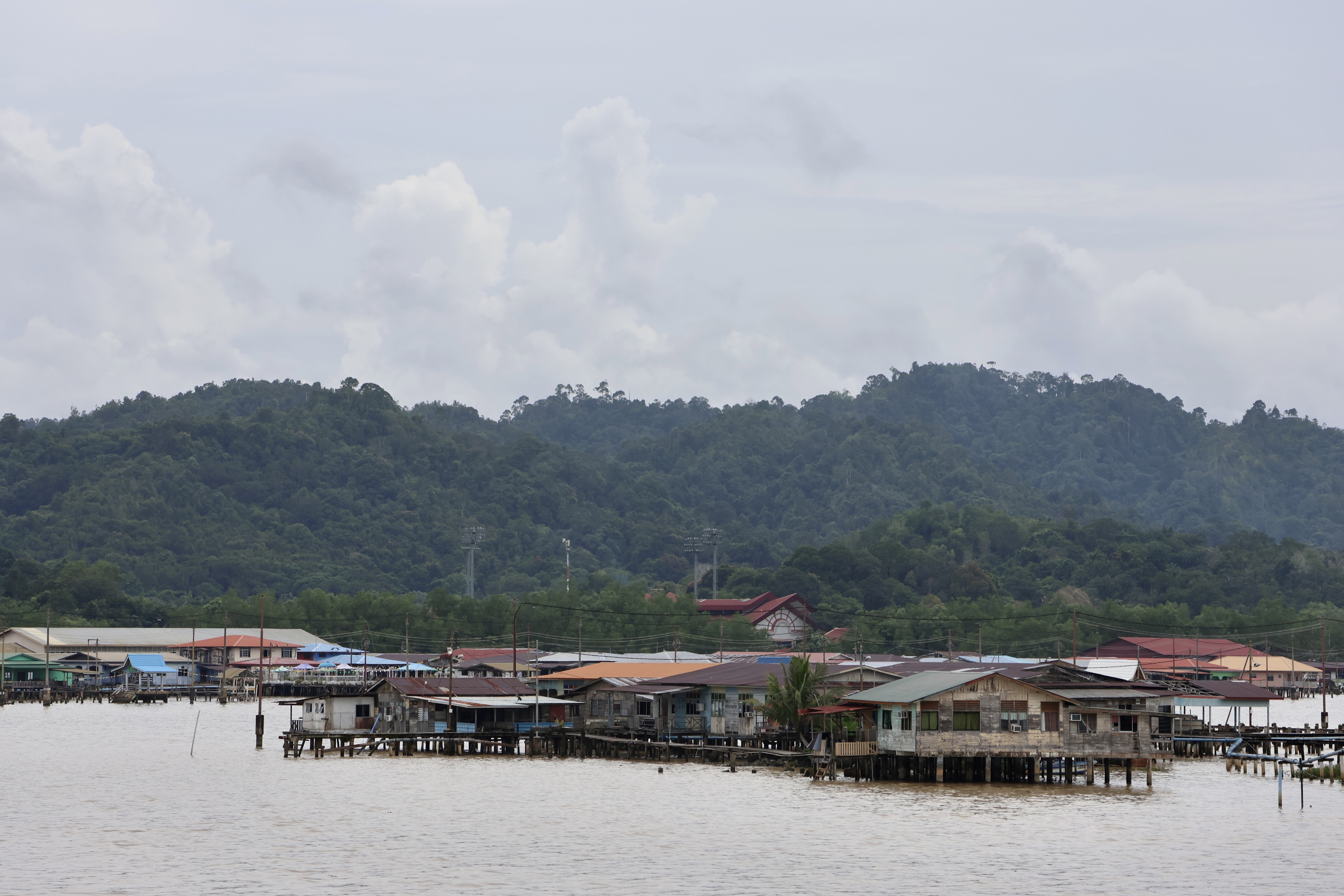
- Saeh Hill in the distance

Highest point
- Elevation: 738 ft (225 m)
- Coordinates: 4.849533°N 114.918722°E

Naming
- Native name: Bukit Saeh (Malay)

Geography
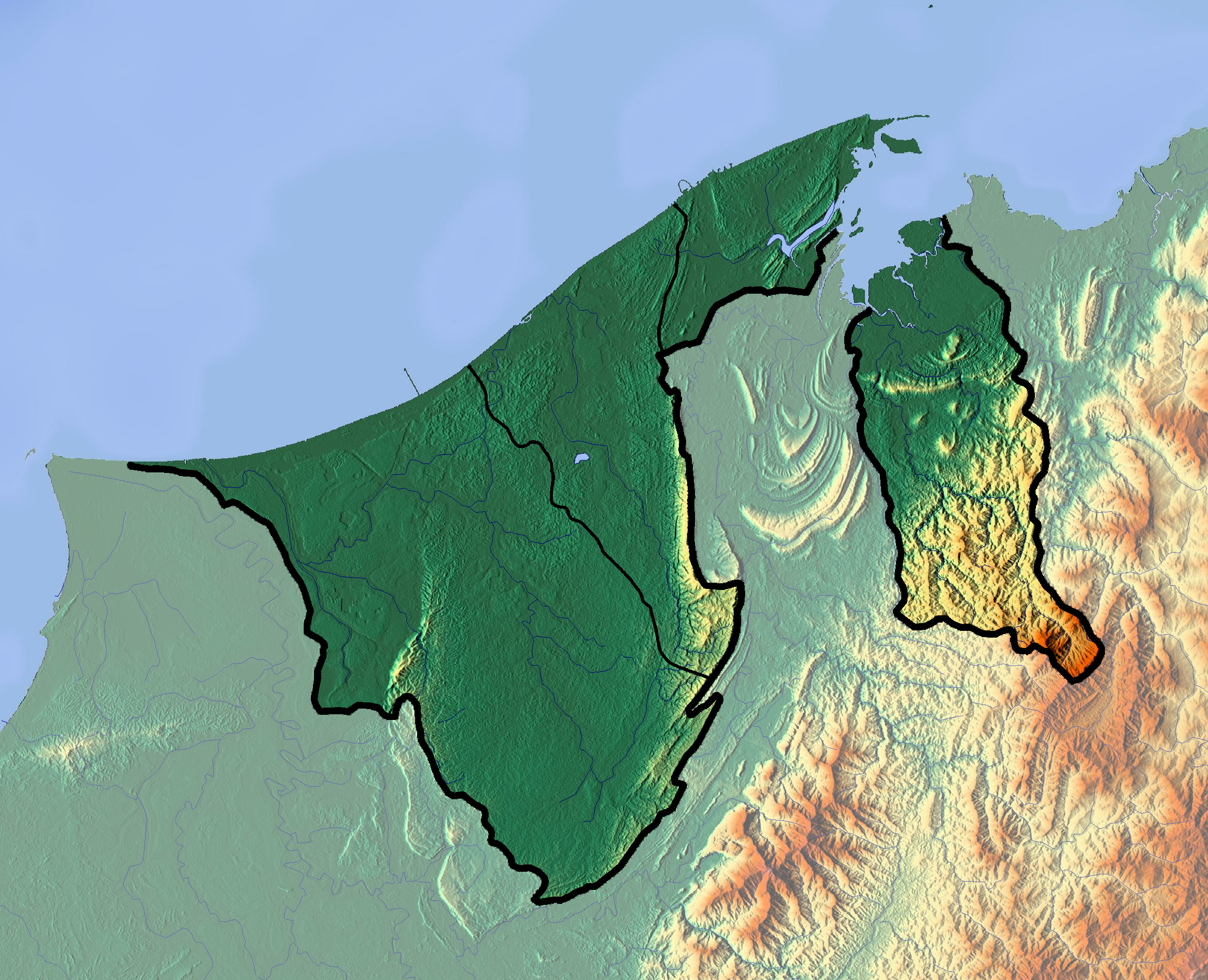
- Location within Brunei
- Country: Brunei
- District: Brunei–Muara
- Mukim: Lumapas
- City: Bandar Seri Begawan

Saeh Hill (Malay: Bukit Saeh), is a hill in Mukim Lumapas, Brunei-Muara District of Brunei. The Bukit Saeh Recreational Park also exists in nearby Kampong Lumapas 'A'. The hill is known for activities such as hiking and sometimes Jungle Rescue Course for search and rescue.

== Geography ==
Saeh Hill sits at the south of both Kampong Ayer and Bandar Seri Begawan with a height of 728 feet (222 m). Moreover, it is also the highest peak in the country's capital Bandar Seri Begawan, which is 6 kilometres (3.7 mi) away. Notably due to the hill's geographical location, storms heading towards Kampong Ayer were shielded alongside the help of Kota Batu's highlands.
