= Legend of the Centipede Lake =

Indonesian folk tale

The legend of the Centipede Lake (Indonesian: Danau Lipan) is a folk tale from Kalimantan that tells the story behind a region in the Muara Kaman district, Kutai Kertanegara Regency, East Kalimantan, Indonesia. Despite its name, the Centipede Lake is not a lake, but rather a large region grown with shrubs.

== Story ==
Long ago Muara Kaman was a sea, ruled by an ancient kingdom which established ports and sent ships within and outside the country. This kingdom had great trade, and was also famous for its beautiful princess. Her name was Putri Aji the White Blood (Putri Aji Berdarah Putih). She was given the nickname “White blood” because her skin was so white that when she swallowed betel water, the red colour of the water could be seen going down her throat.

Hearing of the beauty of Putri Aji, the king of China decided to propose to the princess. He gathered his troops on large ships and left for Muara Kaman, wanting to make an impression. When Putri Aji heard that the king of China was coming to her country, she prepared a welcoming party. The king was welcomed with great celebration, with food, drinks, and dances.

Anticipating the purpose of the Chinese king, Putri Aji gave him a warm welcome. However, she was repelled by the king's barbaric behaviour. He even ate food straight from the bowls without using his hands. “Huh! The king of China acts like an animal! What a waste, greeting him like that”. Putri Aji said.

After eating, the king of China proposed to Putri Aji. However, Putri Aji, disgusted by the behaviour of the king, refused, saying “I don’t want to be the empress of a king who is dirty and does not know manners.” Her answer made the king angry. He left Muara Kaman and went back to China.

However, the king wanted vengeance for his humiliation, and assembled a massive invasion force to take over Putri Aji's kingdom. Putri Aji mobilized her troops and prepared for battle. A battle ensued when the Chinese arrived. Both sides suffered heavy casualties, but Putri Aji's forces lost more men than the Chinese fleet . If the battle continued, however, Putri Aji's forces would be crushed, and nothing would stand in the king's way.

Out of options, Putri Aji took betel from a container and chewed it while chanting a mantra. “If the power passed on to me by my ancestors is true, then turn my betel nut into a ferocious centipede that attacks the troops from China.” She chanted. After her incantation, she spat the betel out all over the area. The pieces of betel that she spat became centipedes that attacked the Chinese soldiers. The number of centipedes continued to increase, even reaching millions.

Afraid, the king of China and his troops ran for their ships to evacuate. However, the centipedes didn't stop their attack. They jumped on the king's massive ship and sank it, drowning all the soldiers with it. The place where the ship sank became a field, overgrown with plants. The water trapped was named the Centipede Lake, in memory of this incident.

== Moral ==
This story contains 2 main lessons: do not be rude to your guest and do not seek vengeance. In Indonesia, it is very rude for a person to eat directly from a container. This teaches those who hear this story how to behave in an Indonesian dining session. Furthermore, this story shows the dangers of needlessly seeking revenge. The king of China tried to take revenge for his hurt ego by invading Putri Aji's nation, but the story shows that the attempt backfired severely. This teaches the readers that they need to know when to accept their fault and move on.
