= Kababayan =

Filipino expression

In Philippine languages, kabayan or kababayan means "fellow Filipino, countryman, or townmate". It is used throughout the Philippines and throughout the various Philippine languages.

Literally, ka- means "co-" and bayan means "town". In the narrow sense, kababayan means a fellow from the same town. However, it is often used in a much broader sense to mean countrymen or compatriots, especially by overseas Filipinos, OFWs, and connotes respect for each other’s commitment to unity because of their common cultural, political, and religious background from the same "bayan", broadly defined.

It should not be confused with balikbayan, a similar Filipino word, which refers exclusively to overseas Filipinos. "Balikbayan" often refers to (often wealthier) Filipinos who reside overseas and visit the Philippines periodically, even for extended stays, whereas "kababayan", when applied to overseas Filipinos, means ones that live in the Philippines but are overseas temporarily, even for years.

== Other uses ==
- Kababayan is the name of the Filipino-American club at University of California Irvine. It has more than 400 members and is affiliated with Kaba Modern from MTV's America's Best Dance Crew.
- It is the name of a daily talk show hosted by Jannelle So on KSCI.
- It is the name of a kulintang-shaped muffin in the Philippines.
