= Siamang putih =

Indonesian folk legend

Siamang putih is the name of an Indonesian folk legend. In this legend, a princess promises that she will wait for her fiancé. After years of waiting for his return, she breaks her promise and is cursed to live out her life as a white siamang (an Indonesian ape). This folktale is also known from the Malay Peninsula, where siamangs occur as well.
