= Sigarlaki and Limbat =

Sigarlaki and Limbat is a folklore originating from North Sulawesi. Sigarlaki is a hunter, Limbat is his servant. They reside in a village known as Tondano. This folklore tells a story about the friendship between Sigarlaki and Limbat. It also provides loyalty as a core value.
