= Legend of Lau Kawar =

Legend of Lau Kawar is a North Sumatran folk legend about an ungrateful son who does not honor his mother. Today Lau Kawar is the name of a lake in Karo Regency, but the legend suggests that the lake was once a village. The village, named Kawar, was submerged following an earthquake and heavy rain. The disaster was caused by God in response to a mother’s prayer asking for punishment for her sinful son.
