= Minangkabau (legend) =

Sumatran myth

The Minangkabau legend told the story of the origin of the name of the Minangkabau people. It is thought to be a conjunction of two words, minang ("victorious") and kabau ("buffalo").

The legend told the story of a territorial dispute between the local West Sumatran people and a neighbouring invading prince. The invading prince and his troops were somehow traditionally associated with Javanese Singhasari kingdom, during their attempt to subdue Sumatra during the Pamalayu expedition (1275). To avoid a battle, the local leader proposed a fight to the death between two water buffaloes to settle the dispute. The prince agreed and set forward his largest, meanest, most aggressive buffalo. The locals set forth a hungry baby buffalo with its small horns ground to be as sharp as knives. Seeing the adult buffalo across the field, the baby ran forward, hoping for milk. The big buffalo saw no threat in the baby buffalo and paid no attention to it, looking around for a worthy opponent. But when the baby thrust his head under the big bull's belly, looking for an udder, the sharpened horns punctured and killed the bull, and the local people won the contest and the dispute, and thus named their tribe "Minangkabau" after the victorious buffalo to mark this important event.

The moral of the story set an example of the use of wisdom and strategy to avoid war and violence. It also celebrated the intelligence and victory of Minangkabau people.

== Buffalo symbolism ==
Kerbau or water buffalo is an important domesticated animal in Minangkabau culture. It can be employed to work the paddy fields in rice agriculture as well as provides milk and meat. The importance of buffalo as cultural symbol is also can be found in other Indonesian traditions, such as Torajan culture.

Buffalo, especially its horns are important cultural symbol in Minangkabau culture. The roofline of traditional houses in West Sumatra, called Rumah Gadang (Minangkabau, "big house"), curves upward from the middle and end in points, in imitation of the water buffalo's upward-curving horns. The fabrics of Minangkabau women's headdresses are also folded and formed to imitate the buffalo's horn.

== Historical record ==
The first mention of the name Minangkabau as Minanga Tamwan, is in the late 7th century Kedukan Bukit inscription, describing Sri Jayanasa's sacred journey from Minanga Tamwan accompanied with 20,000 soldiers heading to Matajap and conquering several areas in the southern of Sumatra.
