= Kababayan (muffin) =

Traditional pastry in the Philippines

- Type: Breakfast, dessert, snack
- Place of origin: Philippines
- Main ingredients: Egg, flour, milk, oil, sugar, baking powder

Kababayan is a Filipino muffin commonly found in local bakeries. It is known for its distinctive round or sombrero-shaped top that resembles a salakot, a traditional Filipino peasant hat. Kababayan is soft, slightly sweet, and is often eaten as a snack or breakfast, often accompanied by coffee or tea.

== Etymology ==
The word kababayan means "fellow citizen" or "local" in Tagalog, symbolizing its familiarity and closeness to Filipinos. It is said that its hat-like shape resembles the traditional salakot, thus further demonstrating Filipino identity and connection to daily life.

== Description ==
Kababayan has a golden-brown exterior and a soft, moist interior. It is slightly denser than typical Western-style muffins, but lighter than other breads. The surface is rounded and slightly cracked, giving it a hat-like appearance.

Common ingredients includ flour, sugar (white or brown), egg, milk or evaporated milk, baking powder (or baking soda), oil or shortening (vegetable or shortening), a little salt and vanilla (optional).

== History ==
There is no specific record of where or when Kababayan bread first appeared, but it is considered one of the classic bakery breads in the Philippines. It became popular during the post-war period as an affordable bread for Filipino families, similar to Pandesal and Monay. It is one of the breads that carries a nostalgic feeling among Filipinos, often associated with youth and a simple lifestyle.

Kababayan is one of the most popular breads in the Philippines. It is affordable, easy to make, and often available in bakeries. Many Filipinos remember it as a favorite snack from childhood — often served with coffee or hot chocolate in the afternoon.
