= Mukim Lumapas =

Mukim of Brunei

- Mukim
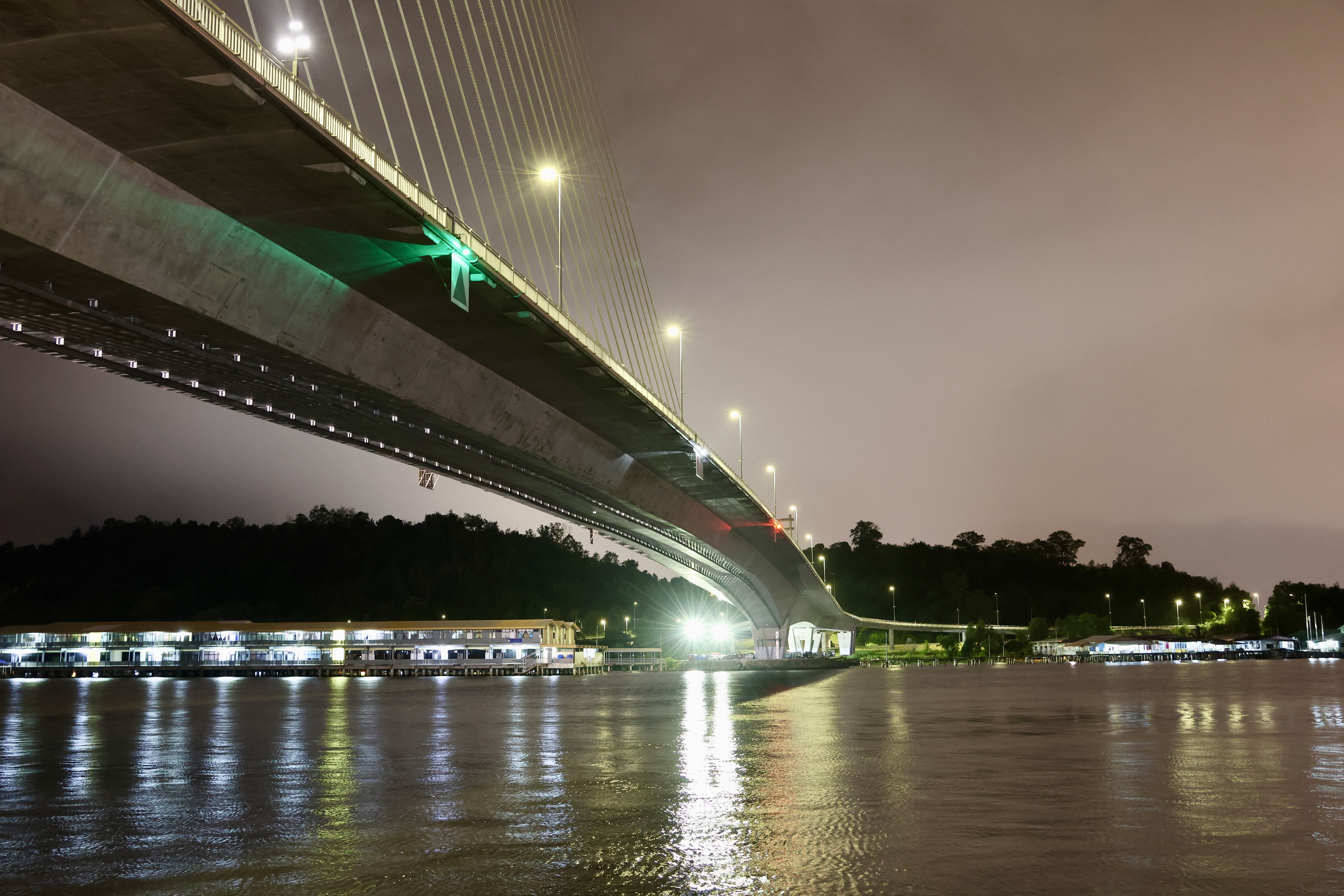
- Mukim Sungai Kebun seen across the Brunei River from Kampong Subok

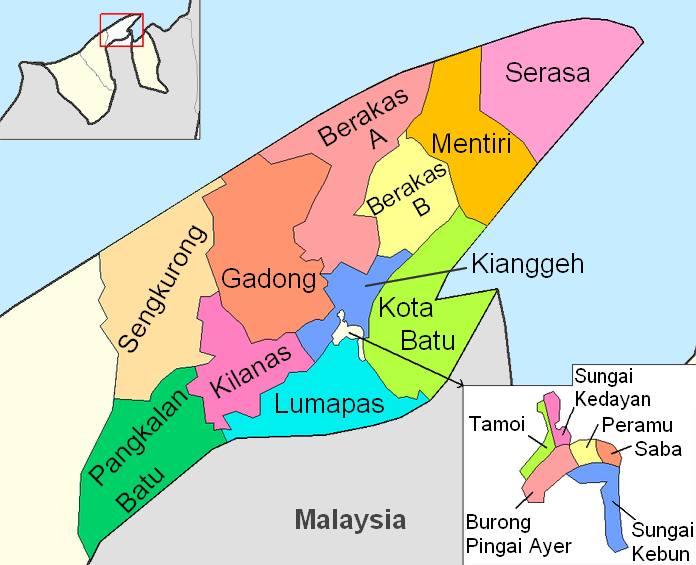
- Lumapas is in cyan.
- Coordinates: 4°49′16″N 114°54′26″E
- Country: Brunei
- District: Brunei-Muara

Government
  - Penghulu: Amran Maidin

Area
  - Total: 62.10 km^{2} (23.98 sq mi)

Population (2021)
  - Total: 8,058
  - Density: 129.8/km^{2} (336.1/sq mi)
- Time zone: UTC+8 (BNT)
- Postcode: BJxx24

Mukim Lumapas is a mukim in Brunei-Muara District, Brunei. It has an area of 62.10 square kilometres (23.98 sq mi); the population was 7,756 in 2016.

== Etymology ==
The mukim is named after Kampong Lumapas, one of the villages it encompasses.

== Geography ==
The mukim is located in the south of the district, bordering the mukims within Kampong Ayer and Mukim Kianggeh to the north, Mukim Kota Batu to the north and east, Limbang District in Sarawak, Malaysia to the east and south, Mukim Pengkalan Batu to the west and Mukim Kilanas to the west and north.

== Demographics ==
As of 2016 census, the population was 7,756 with 49.7% males and 50.3% females. The mukim had 1,208 households occupying 1,187 dwellings. Among the population, 2.3% lived in urban areas, while the remainder of 97.7% lived in rural areas.

== Administration ==
As of 2021, the mukim comprised the following census villages:

Settlements	Population (2021)	Ketua kampung (2024)
Kampong Lupak Luas	363	Haji Suhaili bin Haji Moktar
Kampong Buang Sakar	28	Haji Suhaili bin Haji Moktar
Kampong Tarap Bau	262	Haji Suhaili bin Haji Moktar
Kampong Buang Tekurok	208	Haji Saini bin Haji Maidin
Kampong Lumapas Area A	6,733	Haji Saini bin Haji Maidin
Kampong Panchor (Note: Not to be confused with the village of the same name in Mukim Mentiri)	6,733	Haji Saini bin Haji Maidin
Kampong Lumapas Area B	6,733	Mohammad Ali bin Tanjong
Kampong Kasat	1,146	Haji E’riffin bin Haji Mohd Yussof
Kampong Putat	337	Zainol bin Mohamed
Kampong Baong	351	—N/a
Kampong Kilugus	1,793	—N/a
Kampong Sungai Asam	173	—N/a

== Infrastructures ==
As of 2004, the mukim had three primary schools, three secondary schools, four mosques, a post office and four police posts.

=== Public housing ===
STKRJ Kampong Lumapas is the sole public housing estate within the mukim.

=== Schools ===
Sayyidina Umar Al-Khattab Secondary School (SMSUA), (Note: Abbreviated from the Malay name Sekolah Menengah Sayyidina Umar Al-Khattab) located in Kampong Lupak Luas, was opened in 1994 and inaugurated on 6 August 1996. As of 2004, it had 1,208 students and 105 teachers. It was named after Umar, who was a companion of Muhammad as well as a Rashidun caliph.

== Other locations ==
Other locations within the mukim include:

- Jong Batu, an island in the Brunei River

== Notable people ==
- Othman Bidin (born 1913), Bruneian educator
