= Kampong Kasat =

Village in Brunei

- Village
- Location in Brunei
- Coordinates: 4°49′24″N 114°56′50″E
- Country: Brunei
- District: Brunei-Muara
- Mukim: Lumapas

Government
  - Village head: E'riffin Yussof

Population (2016)
  - Total: 1,029
- Time zone: UTC+8 (BNT)
- Postcode: BJ1724

Kampong Kasat (Note: From the Malay name, lit. "Kasat Village") is a village in Brunei-Muara District, Brunei, about 11 kilometres (6.8 mi) south of the capital Bandar Seri Begawan. The population was 1,029 in 2016. It is one of the villages within Mukim Lumapas.

== Facilities ==
The village's primary school is Kasat Primary School (Note: Malay: Sekolah Rendah Kasat) and has existed since 1903. As of 2004, it had 132 pupils and 13 teachers. It also houses a sekolah ugama ("religious school") i.e. school for the country's Islamic religious primary education. (Note: The name of the religious school is Kasat Religious School (Sekolah Ugama Kasat).)

Kampong Kasat Mosque is the village mosque; it was inaugurated on 28 November 1980. The mosque can accommodate 500 worshippers.
