= Putri Tangguk =

Putri Tangguk is a character from Jambi folklore. According to the story, Putri Tangguk is a mother who has seven kids and lives with her husband. Her husband and she are both farmers. Although they work hard to take care of their children, Putri Tangguk realizes that she does not have much time for her children due to her tiring work. One day, Putri Tangguk tells her husband about a plan she forms, filling up their warehouse with rice and other supplies so that they will not have to work as much or as long. They do this, and on a rainy day, Putri Tangguk walks with her family to the rice field after the sky clears. Suddenly, she slips on the wet ground. She becomes angry at the road and curses it. Nonetheless, they continue on to the rice fields. On their return home, they walk along the same road. Putri Tangguk sows a rice paddy on that road so that it will not ever be slippery again. However, she quickly regrets this act after she realizes that the rice paddy is important. The lesson of the story is to be thankful for what one has.
