= Jong Batu =

Rock outcrop in the Brunei River

Coordinates: 4.8662817°N 114.9255304°E

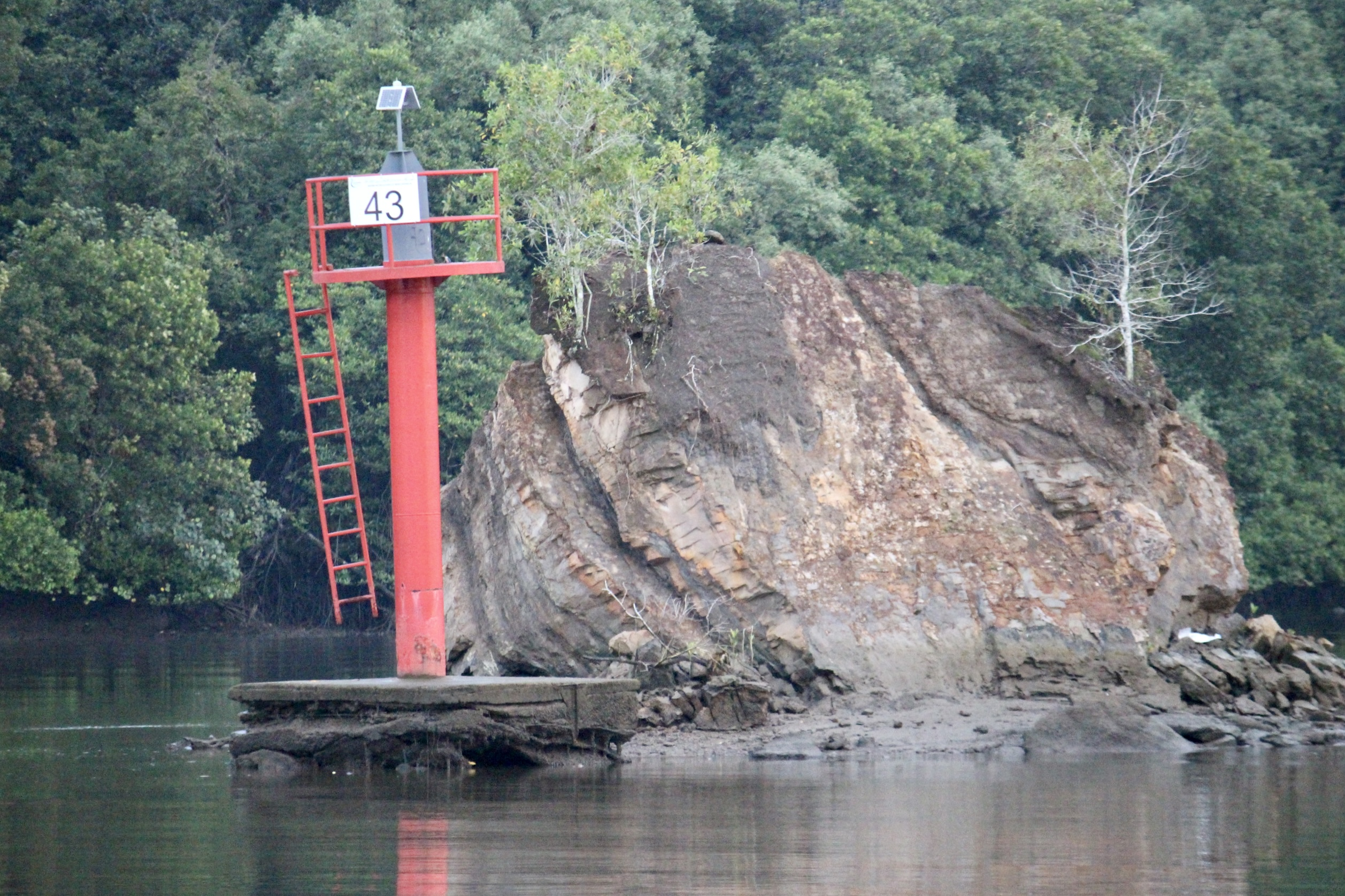
Jong Batu

Jong Batu is a rock outcrop located in the Brunei River. It is shaped such that when viewed from the shores of the Brunei River, it resembles a sinking ship, with the bow sticking out of the water. In Brunei folklore, the legend of Nakhoda Manis (literally the "Captain Sweet" in Malay) tells of how an unfilial son was turned to the rock outcropping known as Jong Batu.

== Description ==
Jong Batu is located in the Brunei River to the east of the Istana Nurul Iman. Administratively, it is part of the Lumapas mukim of the Brunei-Muara district. The rock outcropping is about 20m long and 15m wide at its widest point and is uninhabited. A few shrubs dot the island. It takes approximately 15 minutes to travel to it by boat from Kampong Ayer. A light buoy was constructed near the rock outcropping to warn mariners about the island. The island is a popular spot for sightseeing, especially from the river cruises that operate on the Brunei River.

== Legend ==
In some versions of the story as told in Brunei, Dang Ambon was a rich widow and her son, Nakhoda Manis, inherited wealth from his deceased father. In other versions, they were both poor. Nakhoda Manis wanted to be rich. They lived in Kampong Ayer.

Nakhoda Manis left Kampong Ayer to seek his fortune in the city of Sulu. After many years, he achieved success and wealth there and married a pretty noblewoman and became owner of a huge ship. The version of the legend where they were rich had his mother sharing her wealth with poor people until one day she found herself poor like them. In any case, she longed for her son.

Dang Ambon was overjoyed to hear that her son's ship was going to anchor in the Brunei River and Nakhoda Manis was also looking forward to reuniting with his mother. When he arrived at the Brunei River, Dang Ambon paddled a small boat out towards his larger vessel and shouted that she missed him. He was very happy upon hearing his mother's voice and looked forward to introducing her to his wife. However, before he could say anything to his wife, she was disgusted with the poor old woman and demanded her to be chased away. Nakhoda Manis was forced to turn his back on his mother and ordered his crew to push her small boat away. Other versions of the tale had them throwing her overboard. Dang Ambon was heartbroken and she cursed her son, whereupon a storm came and capsized the ship.

After the storm, there was a huge rock in the river where Nakhoda Manis had anchored his vessel, which sank in the storm. The rock is known today as "Jong Batu" (stone jong).

Similar stories about the ships of unfilial sons turning into stone are also told in Tutong which is a different part of Brunei, the Batu Caves of Selangor in Malaysia, the Philippines and Padang, Sumatra, Indonesia.

== See also ==
- Malin kundang, similar story from the region
- Jong, a type of large ship from Nusantara archipelago
