= Timun Mas =

Indonesian folklore

A 2006 postage stamp issued by Pos Indonesia with a face value of Rp1,500, featuring an illustration of Indonesian folklore and mythology.

Timun Mas or Timun Emas (English: "The Golden Cucumber") is a Javanese folktale telling the story of a brave girl who tries to escape from an evil green giant that tries to catch and eat her.

== Summary ==
Once upon a time in Java, a poor widow named Mbok Srini lived alone on the edge of a jungle. She felt so lonely and prayed to the gods to bless her with a child. One night, in her dream, she envisioned something wrapped under a tree in the jungle. She took this dream as the answer to her prayer. She later went to the jungle searching for it, and she found it exactly as she had seen in her dream. Hoping to find a baby wrapped inside, there was nothing but a cucumber seed. Suddenly, Mbok Srini heard a monstrous, thunderous laughter; a green-skinned giant named Buta Ijo (Javanese for "Green Giant") appeared behind her. The Buta Ijo told her to plant the cucumber seed and that she would have a child to nurture. However, when the child had grown up, Mbok Srini had to return the child to Buta Ijo to be devoured. Desperate for a child, Mbok Srini agreed with Buta Ijo's deal.

Then, Mbok Srini returned to her shack and planted the cucumber seed in an orchard behind her house. After several months, a big, golden cucumber grew from the seed. When Mbok Srini harvested the golden cucumber and cut it open, behold, there was a beautiful baby girl inside it. Therefore, she named the baby girl "Timun Mas" which means "golden cucumber". Mbok Srini took care of and loved Timun Mas as if she were her own flesh and blood. Timun Mas grew up to become a beautiful girl. Besides her beauty, she was a loving, kind, and diligent girl, always willing to help and take care of the aging Mbok Srini. Nevertheless, Mbok Srini never told Timun Mas about her origin nor the agreement between her and Buta Ijo.

Just a week before Timun Mas' 17th birthday, Buta Ijo appeared in Mbok Srini's dream to remind her about their agreement. Mbok Srini became sorrowful and feared for the demise awaiting her beloved daughter. Concerned about Mbok Srini's behavior, Timun Mas kept asking her mother what was on her mind. After incessantly being questioned by her daughter, Mbok Srini then told Timun Mas about her magical origin. Despite that, Timun Mas still loved Mbok Srini as her own mother. When Buta Ijo came to take the girl away, Mbok Srini managed to deceive the giant by telling Timun Mas to fake being ill. Growing impatient, the green giant swore that within one week, he would return to devour Timun Mas. Despite buying some time, Mbok Srini struggled to find a way to save her daughter. She then heard that there was a powerful rishi who resided on a mountain near the jungle. She hastily went up to the mountain to seek help from the rishi. After hearing her story, the wise old rishi gave Mbok Srini four small bags of cloth, each containing cucumber seeds, needles, salts, and terasi (shrimp paste). The rishi then told Mbok Srini to give these bags to Timun Mas and tell her to throw them when she was being chased by Buta Ijo (a giant green monster). Mbok Srini returned home and told Timun Mas what the rishi had said and what to do if the green giant chased her.

Buta Ijo then appeared at Mbok Srini's shack as promised to take and devour Timun Mas. Mbok Srini told Timun Mas to run for her life. Timun Mas was terrified and ran as fast as she could to escape the giant. The green-skinned giant was furious and destroyed Mbok Srini's shack while chasing Timun Mas. With its gigantic stature, Buta Ijo easily caught up to the fleeing Timun Mas. In distress, Timun Mas opened one of her four cloth bags, spreading cucumber seeds behind her. Suddenly, a large cucumber vine appeared and bound the giant's body, trapping it so he could not move. This gave Timun Mas time to get away. However, the powerful giant finally broke free and continued his chase. When Buta Ijo was closing in, Timun Mas opened her second bag and spread needles behind her. The needles transformed into a bamboo forest. The sharp bamboos wounded the giant badly. However, this only enraged Buta Ijo, who managed to get through the sharp bamboo forest and caught up to Timun Mas again.

Timun Mas then opened her third bag and spread salt behind her. Suddenly, a vast sea appeared, drowning the evil giant. Buta Ijo swam across the sea and continued the chase. As her last resort, Timun Mas, once again almost caught, opened the last bag. She threw the terasi behind and continued to run. The terasi transformed into a sea of boiling mud. Sinking under the boiling mud, Buto Ijo drowned in the mud. Timun Mas returned to Mbok Srini, and they lived happily ever after.
