= Kabayan (fictional character) =

Sundanese folkloristic character

Kabayan is a popular character from Sundanese culture, which eventually became also accepted as an Indonesian character. His stories were considered funny and humble, but also smart. Kabayan stories has been carried since ancient times by oral tradition. His stories mostly depict the Sundanese people lives in the developed world around it. Kabayan is somehow similar to the role of middle eastern character such as Abu Nuwas or Nasreddin.

== Books ==
Nowadays the story itself have been starting to be written, locally in Pasundan vicinity, Indonesia nationally and worldwide as in English nor Dutch language.

Few books that has been printed such as :

- Si Kabayan, Utuy Tatang Sontani (1959)
- Si Kabayan Manusia Lucu, Achdiat Karta Mihardja (1997)
- Si Kabayan Nongol di Zaman Jepang, Achdiat Karta Mihardja
- Si Kabayan dan beberapa dongeng Sunda lainnya, Ayip Rosidi (1985)
- Si Kabayan jadi Wartawan, Muhtar Ibnu Thalab (2005)
- Si Kabayan jadi Dukun, Moh. Ambri
- Kabayan Bikin Ulah (2002, komik kompilasi)
- Three South East Asian plays: Si Kabayan by Utuy Sontani, by Utuy Tatang Sontani; Usman Awang; Joo For Lee; Book Language: English Publisher: Kuala Lumpur, Tenggara, 1970.
- Paradoks cerita-cerita si Kabayan by Yakob Sumarjo, Book Language: Indonesian, Publisher: Bandung : Kelir, 2008.
- Tales of Si Kabayan by Murtagh Murphy, Book : Fiction, Language: English Publisher: Hong Kong : Oxford University Press, 1975.
- Si Kabayan by Mulyani S Yeni, Book : National government publication, Language: Indonesian, Publisher: Jakarta : Pusat Bahasa, Departemen Pendidikan Nasional, 2004.

== Film ==
- Si Kabayan (1975)
- Si Kabayan Saba Kota (1989)
- Si Kabayan dan Gadis Kota (1989)
- Si Kabayan dan Anak Jin (1991)
- Si Kabayan Saba Metropolitan (1992)
- Si Kabayan Cari Jodoh (1994)
- Si Kabayan: Bukan Impian (2000)
- Kabayan Jadi Milyuner (2010)

== See also ==
- Paguyuban Pasundan
- Sundanese culture
