= Asian F =

- Glee episode
- Episode no.: Season 3 Episode 3
- Directed by: Alfonso Gomez-Rejon
- Written by: Ian Brennan
- Production code: 3ARC03
- Original air date: October 4, 2011

Guest appearances
- Idina Menzel as Shelby Corcoran; Iqbal Theba as Principal Figgins; Dot-Marie Jones as Shannon Beiste; Ashley Fink as Lauren Zizes; James Earl as Azimio; LaMarcus Tinker as Shane Tinsley; Valerie Mahaffey as Rose Pillsbury; Don Most as Rusty Pillsbury; Tamlyn Tomita as Julia Chang; Keong Sim as Michael Chang, Sr.

Episode chronology
← Previous "I Am Unicorn"	Next → "Pot o' Gold"
- Glee season 3

"Asian F" is the third episode of the third season of the American musical television series Glee, and the forty-seventh overall. Written by series co-creator Ian Brennan and directed by Alfonso Gomez-Rejon, it first aired on Fox in the United States on October 4, 2011. The episode features the introduction of Emma Pillsbury's (Jayma Mays) and Mike Chang's (Harry Shum Jr.) parents, and the final auditions for the McKinley High production of West Side Story, in which the competition between Mercedes Jones (Amber Riley) and Rachel Berry (Lea Michele) leads the former to quit New Directions.

An advance copy of the episode was released to several reviewers, and received a highly enthusiastic response. Once the episode aired many others were equally impressed, though not all. Brittany's (Heather Morris) "Run the World (Girls)" performance was hailed, and the entire Mike Chang storyline, especially his rendition of "Cool" and his initial solo dance sequence, also received favorable notice. The musical numbers were generally greeted positively, among them the three that featured Mercedes, particularly "It's All Over". However, her storyline had its detractors, mostly due to the recurrence of the Mercedes versus Rachel plot, and the inconsistency of her characterization with past appearances.

All six songs were released as singles, available for download, and two, "Fix You" and "Run the World (Girls)", charted on the Billboard Hot 100, and "Fix You" also charted on the Canadian Hot 100. Upon its initial airing, this episode was viewed by 8.42 million American viewers and garnered a 3.6/10 Nielsen rating/share in the 18–49 demographic. The total viewership and ratings for this episode were down slightly from the previous episode, "I Am Unicorn".

== Plot ==
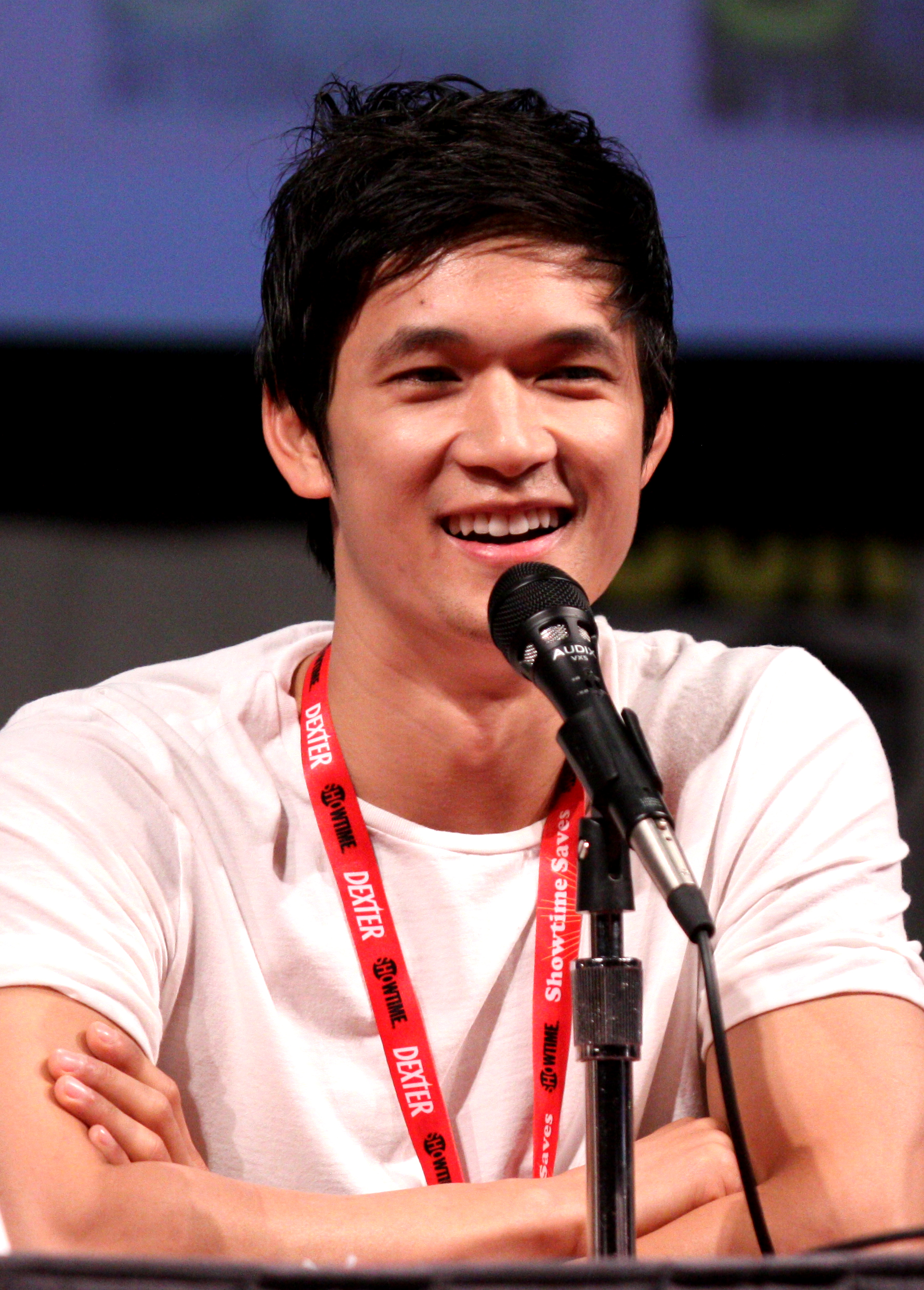
Harry Shum, Jr. (pictured) as Mike gives his first solo singing performance in this episode.

After Mike receives an "A−" on a chemistry exam, his father (Keong Sim) is upset by this "Asian F" and the danger it poses to his chances of attending Harvard, and insists that Mike focus more on his studies and give up glee club and his girlfriend Tina (Jenna Ushkowitz), who has been helping him improve his singing. Mike begs for one more chance and promises to meet with a tutor, but later decides to follow his dreams and auditions for the role of Riff in West Side Story, performing "Cool". He misses a tutoring session and is confronted by his mother (Tamlyn Tomita), and when he admits he wants to be a dancer rather than a doctor, she reveals that she gave up dreams of becoming a dancer and doesn't want her son to do the same.

To promote her candidacy for senior class president, Brittany (Heather Morris) sings a rousing song of female empowerment—"Run the World (Girls)"—at an impromptu assembly, with the help of the Cheerios and Santana (Naya Rivera), who has rejoined New Directions unbeknownst to cheerleading coach Sue Sylvester (Jane Lynch). The enormous enthusiasm of the school's entire female population worries Kurt (Chris Colfer), the other candidate in the race. Kurt has given up his dream to play Tony in the musical, and gives a bouquet of roses to his boyfriend Blaine (Darren Criss), the likely choice as Tony.

Will (Matthew Morrison) is insecure about his relationship with Emma because she hasn't asked him to meet her parents, so he invites them to dinner without telling her. They mock their daughter's OCD, which angers Will, and display an extreme hair-color obsession—Emma refers to them as "ginger supremacists". Her OCD suffers a severe resurgence under the stress of their visit. A helpless Will apologizes, and joins Emma when she prays.

Mercedes (Amber Riley), supported by her boyfriend Shane (LaMarcus Tinker), auditions for the role of Maria and impresses the directors—Emma, Coach Beiste (Dot-Marie Jones) and Artie (Kevin McHale)—with her rendition of "Spotlight". They schedule a callback between her and Rachel (Lea Michele) to help them decide who should be cast in the role. Mercedes is angry about what she perceives as continued favoritism shown to Rachel, especially in the awarding of solos, and when Will pushes her in the glee club's extra dance rehearsals that Rachel is excused from, she decides she has had enough and quits glee club. When Mercedes and Rachel compete by singing "Out Here On My Own" in the callbacks, Mercedes gives a performance that Rachel privately concedes was better, which prompts Rachel to begin a last-minute candidacy for senior class president to improve her college prospects; this dismays Kurt, who now has another rival to campaign against. The three directors decide to offer the role of Maria to both contenders, with each to do half the performances, but Mercedes is convinced she deserved to win the part outright and refuses to accept half a role. She withdraws from contention, which leaves Rachel as the sole Maria, and volunteers to join Shelby Corcoran's (Idina Menzel) new glee club. The cast list is posted, with Rachel as Maria, Blaine as Tony, Santana as Anita, Mike as Riff, Puck as Bernardo, and Kurt as Officer Krupke.

== Production ==
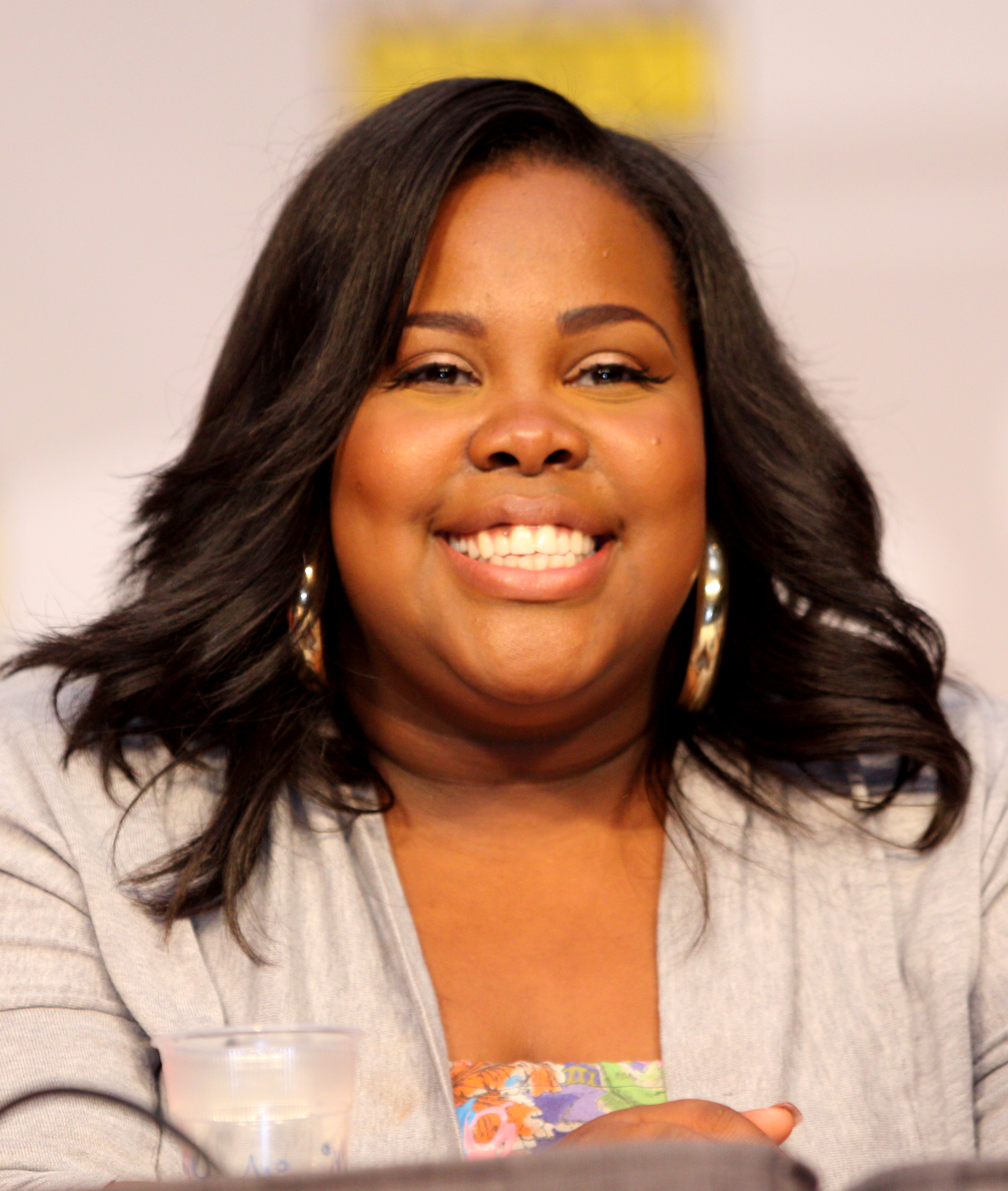
As Mercedes, Amber Riley (pictured) appreciated the chance in this episode to perform a modern pop song, as opposed to the character's usual "diva-ish" songs.

The episode began filming on August 29, 2011; the finale was filmed on September 16, 2011. The script was written by series co-creator Ian Brennan and the episode was directed by Alfonso Gomez-Rejon.

Two new sets of parents are introduced during the episode. Emma's parents, Rose and Rusty Pillsbury, are played by Valerie Mahaffey and Don Most. Mays was very excited when she learned Most, who played Ralph Malph on the 1970s sitcom Happy Days, had been cast, and exclaimed, "What? He's my father?!" Both Most and Mahaffey were so funny during the shooting of their sequence that she had to apologize for causing a portion to have to be reshot, telling them, "I'm so sorry, the back of my shoulders were shaking because I was laughing so hard."

Mike's parents, who may become recurring characters, are Tamlyn Tomita in the role of Julia Chang, and Keong Sim as Mike Chang, Sr. Recurring guest stars appearing in the episode include Principal Figgins (Iqbal Theba), football coach Shannon Beiste (Dot-Marie Jones), student Lauren Zizes (Ashley Fink), teacher Shelby Corcoran (Idina Menzel) and football players Shane Tinsley (LaMarcus Tinker) and Azimio (James Earl).

This episode features the show's first Coldplay cover, "Fix You". Coldplay had previously refused to license their music for use on Glee, but later changed their minds. Five other songs are covered, including Beyoncé's "Run the World (Girls)" sung by Morris, Jennifer Hudson's "Spotlight" sung by Riley, "Cool" from West Side Story sung by Shum in his first solo, "Out Here On My Own" from Fame sung by Riley and Michele, and "It's All Over" from Dreamgirls performed by Riley and most of New Directions. Riley appreciated the opportunity to perform "Spotlight", a modern pop song, "because Mercedes usually does the old diva-ish" songs. She found the episode challenging, as she "really had to think about who Mercedes is".

== Reception ==
=== Ratings ===
"Asian F" was first broadcast on October 4, 2011, in the United States on Fox. It garnered a 3.6/10 Nielsen rating/share in the 18–49 demographic, and received 8.42 million American viewers during its initial airing. It was second for the third week in a row in its timeslot to NCIS on CBS, which earned a 4.2/12 rating/share in the 18–49 demographic, and also by the third episode of New Girl, which follows Glee on Fox, and brought in a 4.3/11 rating/share and 8.65 million viewers. The Glee numbers were down slightly from the previous week's episode, "I Am Unicorn", which netted a 3.7/11 rating/share and 8.60 million viewers.

Viewership increased markedly in other countries. In the United Kingdom, "Asian F" was watched on Sky1 by 1.10 million viewers, up over 10% compared to "I Am Unicorn" in the previous week, when 995,000 viewers were watching. In Australia, "Asian F" was watched by 843,000 viewers, which made Glee the eleventh most-watched program of the night. The viewership was up significantly from "I Am Unicorn" the week before, which drew 729,000 viewers, and also an improvement over the season premiere's 760,000. In Canada, 1.82 million viewers watched the episode, and it was the fourteenth most-viewed show of the week, up four slots and 21% from the 1.50 million viewers who watched "I Am Unicorn".

=== Critical reception ===
Kristin dos Santos of E! Online and Michael Ausiello of TVLine heavily praised screener copies of the episode. Dos Santos called it "arguably the best episode of Glee, not just this season but in the history of the series", while Ausiello praised the episode as "a standout hour". Tim Stack of Entertainment Weekly also viewed the episode in advance, and was similarly impressed; he wrote that it was "one of the series' best episodes ever".

A number of critics who viewed the episode when it aired were equally taken with "Asian F". The Atlantic's Kevin Fallon called it Glee's "best ever", while others, including Erica Futterman of Rolling Stone and Abby West of Entertainment Weekly said it was the best one of the new third season. Vanity Fair's Brett Berk wrote, "This week's episode stands out as one of the most cohesive and well acted in the series's pantheon", though he wondered what had happened to the show's humorous side, something also noted by Futterman, who found it to be a significant problem: "Glee's own identity crisis of not knowing whether or not it's a sitcom has made it hard to get deeply invested in its characters." Amy Reiter of the Los Angeles Times wrote that "the producers hit every note (emotional, musical, character, plot) as squarely as Rachel Berry auditioning for a coveted role", and the episode "had emotional truth, character growth, new revelations and really good musical numbers: the kind that seem to emerge organically from the plot and deepen and advance it." AOLTV's Crystal Bell said the episode delivered on the setup in the previous "I Am Unicorn" outing, and said "it definitely seems to echo the glory days" of the first season. TV Guide later included "Asian F" in its list of 2011's Top TV Episodes.

Others were not as impressed. Although he praised "fantastic performances by Harry Shum as Mike Chang and Jayma Mays as Emma", Anthony Benigno of The Faster Times criticized the "hackneyed storytelling that moves nobody forward", and IGN's Robert Canning noted that the show's "inconsistent character development" was on display, though he gave the episode his best grade so far in the season, a "great" 8 out of 10. Samantha Urban of The Dallas Morning News likened "Asian F" to a "half-hearted meal": while she said the subplots featuring Mike and Emma "worked really well", the main storyline featuring Mercedes "was offensive in how lazily it was executed".

The Mercedes storyline was met with widely divergent reactions, though her musical numbers were generally given high marks. In addition to Urban, many reviewers were unhappy with the return of the Rachel versus Mercedes rivalry, including Bell, who lamented that it had "been done every season". Nearly as many expressed the hope that Mercedes was not pregnant given her nausea in the first "booty camp" scene, including Vicki Hyman of The Star-Ledger, BuddyTV's John Kubicek, and West. Benigno felt Mercedes was acting "wildly out of character" in the episode. Michael Slezak of TVLine was also puzzled at her change, and asked, "When has Mercedes ever been anything other than a team player and New Directions MVP? Seriously, nobody's going to cut her slack for a bad week?" Canning agreed, and wrote: "Schue's tough love with Mercedes came out of left field", and felt it added to the "inconsistency of these characters", even though "it ultimately made sense" in the context of setup for "It's All Over". Time's James Poniewozik wrote that having the story "turn on her resentment at being overlooked by the glee club is an apt meta-touch, since she's been overlooked by the show for some time now." Emily VanDerWerff of The A.V. Club was the most enthusiastic about her storyline, and called it "the best part of the episode": it was "all about how she now feels appreciated—because she has a boyfriend, sigh—and so she's willing to take on Rachel for the role of Maria (and, actually, beat her) and push for what she feels is rightfully hers, which involves more respect from New Directions."

Mike Chang's first major storyline was the most widely praised of the episode. West said Shum "really showed his acting chops", and Urban thought the "plot worked well", though she heaped scorn on the notion that "any college would consider glee club a detriment" in an application. Mike's "Cool" performance was very well received. Berk called it a "spectacular audition" and Bell said it was "one of the highlights of the episode"; she also noted that the episode "really solidified" Mike and Tina's relationship, though she also pointed out that Tina was "the most neglected member of the entire cast". Mike's scenes in the dance studio were even more highly praised than "Cool". The first, when Mike "dances alone and imagines Tina and his dad in the room with him" was described as "really beautiful" by Benigno. Fallon characterized it as "a standout scene": "the performer dances out his life frustrations, pirouetting-as-catharsis until he realizes that the only place he feels happy is on stage. It's a trademark Glee moment." Hyman agreed, and wrote, "When he ducked into the studio and started dancing by himself, without music, it reminded me of how special a show Glee can be". Lesley Goldberg of The Hollywood Reporter lauded the subsequent scene in the studio with his mother as the "most touching part" of the storyline, and more than one reviewer admitted shedding tears, including Reiter.

Poniewozik stated that the Will and Emma storyline "again shows how Glee handles adults much worse than teens", and added, "there's no reason this couldn't have been a rewarding plot". Hyman called it a "bizarre subplot", and Berk stated that the "patent absurdity" of the "ginger eugenics" of Emma's parents "felt out of whack, tonally, with the rest of the episode". VanDerWerff felt that the story failed to work "despite featuring Don Most and Valerie Mahaffey doing their very best". Canning thought Most's role as Emma's "racist Ginger Supremacist father was perhaps the greatest bit of casting I've seen on television all year". Urban thought the subplot "worked really well", though she added that there were "missteps". Brittany's campaign rally flash mob, complete with her performance of "Run the World (Girls)", was a huge favorite; Poniewozik called it "an excellent Brittany dance showcase". Hyman was critical of the "ridiculousness" of Rachel's run for senior class president, a development Urban said "made absolutely zero sense". VanDerWerff lauded the "montage of the kids finding out who was cast" in West Side Story, and said it "might be the best thing the show has ever done." Amy Lee of The Huffington Post wrote, "The football team is dancing again. This can only be good." Urban mentioned that seeing "Cool" performed by the football players made her realize that "we haven't seen Karofsky this season." Benigno was more direct: "where the hell is Karofsky?"

=== Music and performances ===
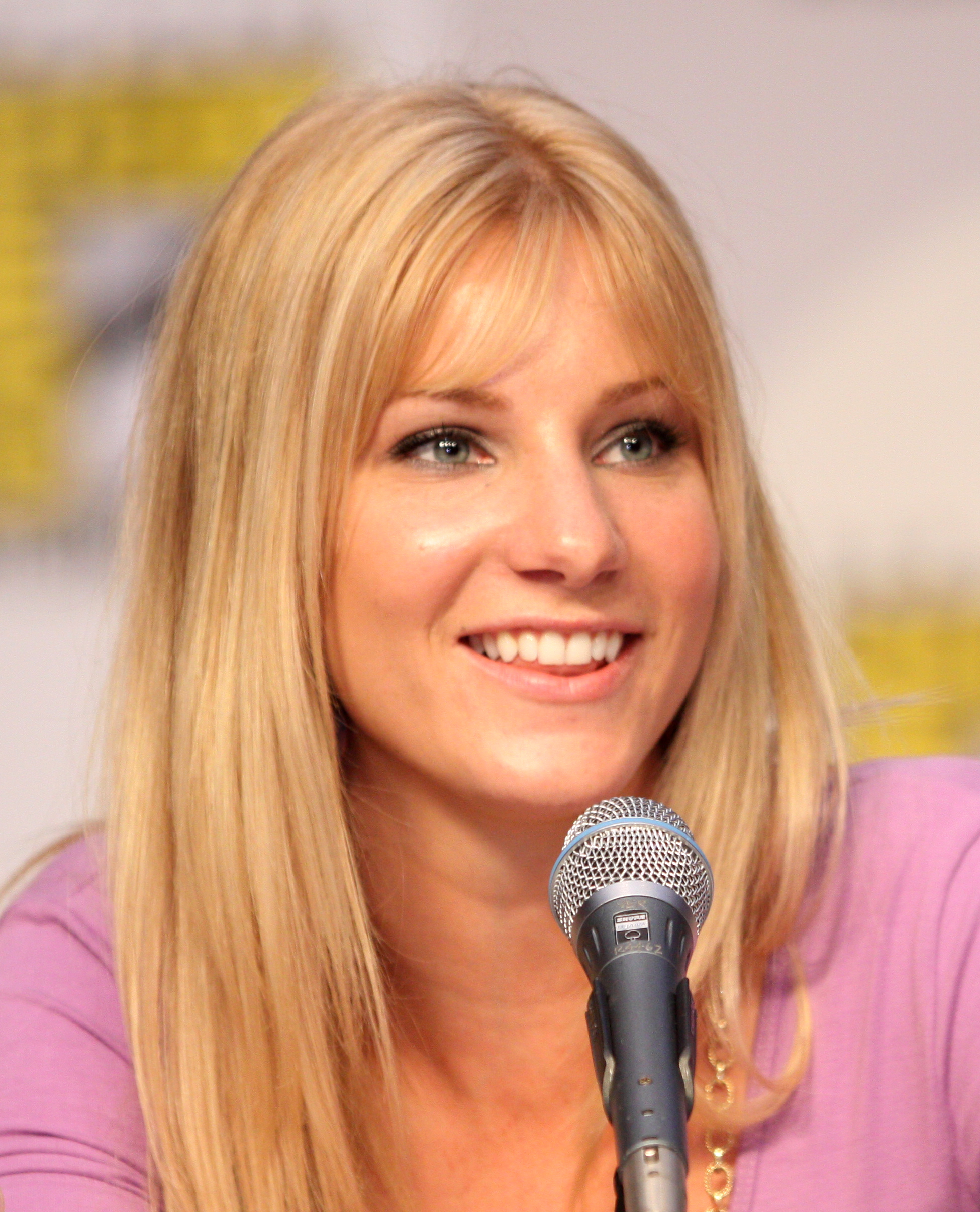
Heather Morris (pictured) as Brittany gives a standout performance of "Run the World (Girls)" in this episode.

The episode's musical performances were generally well-received, though a few reviewers, including Benigno, chafed at the continued emphasis on Broadway showtunes. Both of the major dance numbers came in for considerable praise, and "Run the World (Girls)" garnered the most superlatives: Fallon wrote, "Brittany's performance of "Run the World (Girls)" was thrilling. It was the most adrenaline-pumping musical number the series has produced: intricately choreographed, expertly shot and edited, perfectly woven into the story, and performed exquisitely by Heather Morris." VanDerWerff "enjoyed the ginormous production number built around it quite a bit", and The Wall Street Journal's Raymund Flandez called it a "stellar performance". Kubicek stated, "this was unbelievably superb, easily my favorite performance of the entire season". Futterman noted that "Brittany's vocals are nowhere near the power of Beyoncé's, but they're just fine for this performance, the real focus of which is the dancing."

Mercedes featured in three of the episode's musical numbers. Flandez said of her solo, "She blew Jennifer Hudson's 'Spotlight' out of this world." Benigno wrote that it was "great", but added that it was "not much of a stretch for Amber Riley to hit this one". Berk praised her "amazing voice" and gave the performance four stars out of five, and Goldberg characterized the rendition as "flawless". Other reviewers were more critical, including VanDerWerff, who said that this was the only song in the episode that "really didn't work". Slezak felt that the arrangement used was not distinct enough from the original, though he gave the performance a "B+", as did West, who wrote, "Mercedes looked fantastic and carried herself well, and her voice was as strong as ever but it felt a little lacking." In her "Maria-off" with Rachel, Benigno said they "both kill it", characterized it as "easy but fun", and gave it an "A−", as did Slezak and West, the latter of whom "didn't feel that Mercedes was the clear winner" but thought both singers were "fantastic". Kubicek thought that "Mercedes clearly won" and Flandez maintained that she "clearly outshone her rival", and continued, "You just believe so much of what she sings." Berk agreed, and contrasted the two singers with his rating scale of one to five stars: "Two stars for Rachel, who sang this like Barry Manilow; four for Mercedes, who sang this like she lived it." Futterman had a slightly different take: "Rachel puts on a diva front, but inside she's scared and nervous, while Mercedes is just a diva." However, Hyman thought that the two "were evenly matched", while Canning and Billboard's Rae Votta both thought Rachel was the victor; Votta stated, "While the show wants us to believe otherwise, Rachel clearly outsang Mercedes". "It's All Over" from Dreamgirls received the most enthusiastic commentary, including an "A+" from West, who wrote "Mercedes was at her best in this performance", a sentiment echoed by Benigno when he awarded the song an "A". Hyman called it "pretty awesome" and Flandez a "cleverly amusing take", while Futterman said Mercedes "fully embraces her inner Effie White" and that the song was "on par with the best of Glee's Broadway songs in terms of plot relevancy and vocal arrangements". She also praised "the first group showtune the New Directions have done" and added, "we want more". Votta characterized it as "a flawless fantasy homage" and stated, "It's the perfect use of the non-realism of "Glee" and the power of musical theater to express a storyline". Kubicek agreed it was "like a real musical" in these regards and praised Mike's short solo, and West liked the segment where Santana confronts Mercedes in the number. Slezak was not enthusiastic about the rendition, and wrote that he wished that the "scene gelled better than it did", and questioned why Mercedes was the character Effie while all the other members of New Directions were themselves. He gave the number a "C+".

Votta wrote of "Cool" that "for Mike Chang's first solo it's impressive", and added, "maybe he should play Tony instead of Blaine"; Slezak also thought he should have been considered for Tony since it was "performed with such verve and swagger and charisma". Even so, he conceded that Mike (and Shum) was "not the strongest singer", an assessment echoed in the "decent singer" characterizations from Hyman and Kubicek, and the former called the performance a fine job while the latter wrote that "Mike Chang is the total package". Flandez said Mike's singing "wasn't so terrible", but while Lee said his is "not, by any means, a wonderful voice" she also said "he still pirouettes with the kind of easy grace that makes each move a joy to watch." Futterman wrote, "He's got the smooth dance moves down ... but, most impressively, his slick vocals are on point, hitting nice rises and falls at certain moments but mostly staying 'real cool', as the song calls for", and Berk gave the performance five of five stars. "Fix You" received the least warm reception of the songs in the episode. Benigno criticized it for being "exactly like the original", though he gave it a "B" and noted that the "last bit is kind of chillingly good in Matthew Morrison's hands". Flandez felt that the show's version "pales in imitation to the original". Futterman thought it was "thematically appropriate" but "not Schuester's finest singing moment", and Lee stated that "the song does not fit Morrison's range comfortably". Kevin P. Sullivan of MTV called it a "surprisingly tragic and moving rendition", but Kubicek characterized it as an "emotionally manipulative song", and West did not like the "implied condescension" of Will singing the song to Emma and gave it a "B", though she thought Morrison "sounded good" and it was a "good way to close out the show". In December 2012, TV Guide listed the rendition as one of Glee's worst performances.

=== Chart history ===
Two of the six cover versions released as singles debuted on the Billboard Hot 100: "Fix You" debuted at number fifty-three and "Run the World (Girls)" at number ninety-one. "Fix You" debuted at number seventy-six on the Billboard Canadian Hot 100, and was the one song from the episode to appear on that chart. Both "Fix You" and "Run the World (Girls)" were featured on the soundtrack album Glee: The Music, Volume 7.
