= The New Rachel =

- Glee episode
- Episode no.: Season 4 Episode 1
- Directed by: Brad Falchuk
- Written by: Ryan Murphy
- Production code: 4ARC01
- Original air date: September 13, 2012

Guest appearances
- Whoopi Goldberg as Carmen Tibideaux; Kate Hudson as Cassandra July; Mike O'Malley as Burt Hummel; Vanessa Lengies as Sugar Motta; Alex Newell as Wade "Unique" Adams; Samuel Larsen as Joe Hart; Melissa Benoist as Marley Rose; Dean Geyer as Brody Weston; Jacob Artist as Jake Puckerman; Becca Tobin as Kitty Wilde; Josh Sussman as Jacob Ben Israel; Trisha Rae Stahl as Millie Rose; Amanda Jane Cooper as Beatrice McClaine

Episode chronology
← Previous "Goodbye"	Next → "Britney 2.0"
- Glee season 4

"The New Rachel" is the premiere episode of the fourth season of the American musical television series Glee, and the sixty-seventh episode overall. Written by Ryan Murphy and directed by Brad Falchuk, it aired on Fox in the United States on September 13, 2012. The episode features Rachel (Lea Michele) beginning school at the New York Academy of the Dramatic Arts (NYADA), while at McKinley High, the national champion New Directions glee club must regroup after losing eight seniors to graduation. Special guest star Kate Hudson makes her first appearance as Rachel's dance instructor, Cassandra July, and Whoopi Goldberg returns as NYADA dean Carmen Tibideaux.

== Plot ==
Rachel Berry (Lea Michele) accidentally offends Cassandra July (Kate Hudson), her dance instructor at the New York Academy of Dramatic Arts (NYADA) in New York City, who begins to push Rachel as much as she can. Rachel also befriends upperclassman Brody Weston (Dean Geyer), who helps her adjust to life in the dorm. Rachel later confronts Cassandra about her bullying attitude towards her. To affirm her superiority to Rachel, Cassandra performs a mashup of Lady Gaga's "Americano" with Jennifer Lopez's "Dance Again".

In Lima, Ohio, glee club director Will Schuester (Matthew Morrison) reunites with the returning members of New Directions—Artie Abrams (Kevin McHale), Tina Cohen-Chang (Jenna Ushkowitz), Brittany Pierce (Heather Morris), Sam Evans (Chord Overstreet), Blaine Anderson (Darren Criss), Sugar Motta (Vanessa Lengies), and Joe Hart (Samuel Larsen)—who have become popular after winning Nationals. He announces that Wade "Unique" Adams (Alex Newell) has transferred to William McKinley High School to join New Directions.

Tina, Brittany, Blaine and Wade decide to compete to see who's going to be "The New Rachel" and perform Carly Rae Jepsen's "Call Me Maybe" for Artie, who has been asked to choose the winner. He eventually chooses Blaine. McKinley graduate Kurt Hummel (Chris Colfer) visits cheerleading coach Sue Sylvester (Jane Lynch) to meet her baby daughter, Robin, and is introduced to Sue's new protégée and head cheerleader Kitty Wilde (Becca Tobin), who mocks him for not yet being in college.

New Directions holds auditions to select new members for the club. A student who only identifies himself as Jake (Jacob Artist) performs The Fray's "Never Say Never", but becomes angry when he's not allowed to finish the song and storms off. The next candidate, Marley Rose (Melissa Benoist), performs Billy Joel's "New York State of Mind", the same song Rachel performs in a NYADA class, having just seen Carmen Tibideaux (Whoopi Goldberg) cut the first freshman to sing from the program for failing to impress her. Rachel elicits a "nice" from Tibideaux and impresses Brody, who later compliments her and helps her deal with the strangeness of New York and pressure of NYADA. Marley is welcomed into New Directions, but is disappointed when she hears them making fun of an obese lunch lady (Trisha Rae Stahl), whom she reveals is her mother. Sam and New Directions later apologize for their behavior, and their actions motivate Kitty to deem them unpopular once more and slushie Marley and Unique. Blaine invites Marley to sing lead at the club's next rehearsal.

Blaine performs Imagine Dragons' "It's Time" to encourage Kurt to go to New York and follow his dreams. Kurt soon does, and his father Burt Hummel (Mike O'Malley) drives him to the airport, where they share a heartfelt goodbye. Will learns that Jake is actually Noah "Puck" Puckerman's half-brother. He invites Jake to join New Directions, seeing that it helped Puck. Will also explains that he interrupted Jake's performance because he had already seen that Jake was good, but Jake refuses, unwilling to let go of his anger and saying that he is nothing like his half-brother.

Rachel and Kurt reunite in New York, and Kurt suggests they rent a small apartment and move in together, and Marley and New Directions perform Adele's "Chasing Pavements" as Jake looks on.

== Production ==
Season four of Glee began filming on Tuesday, July 24, 2012. Series co-creator Brad Falchuk, who directed the episode, tweeted a photo from the choir room set that day showing the seven returning glee club actors. His fellow co-creator Ryan Murphy wrote the episode. The actors playing the Puckerman half brothers, Salling and Artist, both had their first day on the set that Friday, July 27.

Starting with this episode, Glee moves from Tuesday nights at 8 pm to Thursday nights at 9 pm ET for the fourth season. Episodes will be airing after that evening's 8 pm ET music competition "results" shows—The X Factor in the fall and American Idol in midseason.

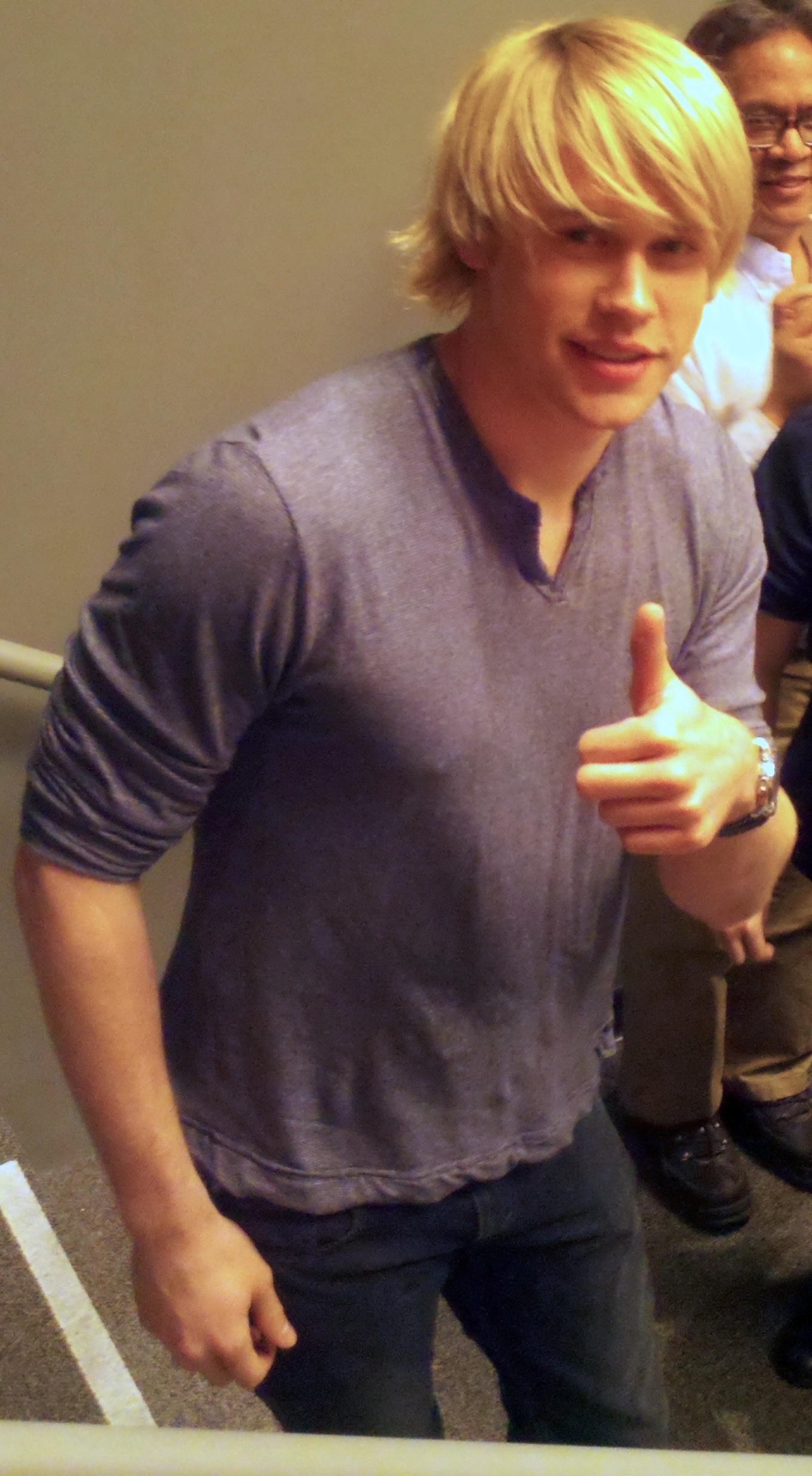
This episode marks the promotion of Chord Overstreet (pictured) to the main cast from his previous guest-star status.

While initial reporting in the press alluded to three specific new main cast members, the promotion of Chord Overstreet, who plays glee club member Sam Evans, from the recurring cast, is the only one shown on Fox's press release for this episode. The other two reported main cast additions were new actors on the show—Dean Geyer, who portrays Brody Weston, a NYADA upperclassman, and Jacob Artist, who plays Puck's younger half brother Jake Puckerman at McKinley High—and are listed in the guest cast by Fox. Mike O'Malley, who plays Burt Hummel and was a recurring cast member in the first and third seasons and a main cast member in the second season, was listed by Fox in the main cast for this episode, however, the episode listed him as a guest star.

Returning recurring characters in this episode include special guest star Whoopi Goldberg as NYADA dean Carmen Tibideaux, glee club members Sugar Motta (Vanessa Lengies) and Joe Hart (Samuel Larsen), student journalist Jacob Ben Israel (Josh Sussman) and Wade Adams (Newell) who was the featured singer of Vocal Adrenaline in the third season. New recurring characters include the previously mentioned Brody (Geyer) and Jake (Artist), Marley Rose (Benoist), who joins the glee club, and Kitty (Becca Tobin), who is a cheerleader.

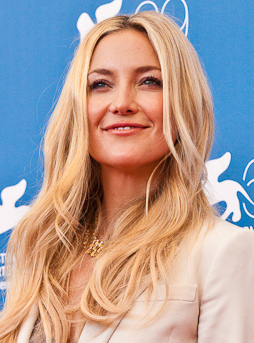
Special guest star Kate Hudson (pictured) make her first appearance as Cassandra July.

Special guest star Kate Hudson begins a six-episode arc as Cassandra July, Rachel's dance instructor at NYADA. Cassandra, according to Falchuk, teaches "based on negative reinforcement".

Studio recording by the cast members began by July 19, 2012. Jenna Ushkowitz and Heather Morris both recorded on that day. The first New Directions group number shot for the season is a cover of Adele's "Chasing Pavements". Other songs performed include a cover of Carly Rae Jepsen's "Call Me Maybe", featuring lead vocals by Ushkowitz, Morris and Darren Criss, and Criss on lead in a cover of "It's Time" by Imagine Dragons. Artist covered a song he sang when auditioning for his role as Jake, The Fray's "Never Say Never". Hudson performed a mashup of "Dance Again" by Jennifer Lopez and "Americano" by Lady Gaga. Michele and Benoist dueted on Billy Joel's "New York State of Mind". Six singles are being released from the episode, of all five aforementioned individual songs plus the two-song mashup.

The episode includes scenes shot on location in New York City. Filming there took place the weekend of August 11, 2012.

== Reception ==
=== Ratings ===
"The New Rachel" received a 3.1/8 Nielsen rating/share in the 18–49 demographic and attracted 7.41 million American viewers during its initial broadcast. Including DVR numbers, the show gained a 1.5 rating with adults 18–49, adding up to a total of 4.6.

In Australia, it was broadcast October 24, 2012 on Network Ten. It received 552,000 viewers and was the 20th most watched program of the night. Viewership dropped quite considerably in comparison to the broadcast of the season 3 final episode "Goodbye" which aired on May 31, 2012, and had received 657,000 viewers.

In the UK, it was broadcast on January 6, 2013, on Sky 1. It received 481,000 viewers.

=== Critical reception ===
Reviews of the episode from pre-broadcast screenings have been mostly positive. The episode scored 72 out of 100 or "generally favorable reviews" on Metacritic, based on reviews from four critics. One of these was Matt Roush of TV Guide, who wrote, "Glee is off to a good start. Please let it last." Jenna Mullins of E! Online called it "well-paced, entertaining and a solid beginning to what will surely be a closely watched season of Glee." Michael Slezak of TVLine commented that "Ryan Murphy & Co. have ... managed to beautifully balance these dueling locations [New York and Ohio] in a way that never feels schizophrenic or jarring."

== Music ==
For this episode, six singles were released accompanying the season opener, totaling 157,000 downloads sold in the United States. In comparison with 2011's third-season premiere episode, the cast's opening-week sales totaled a lower sum (149,000); however, only five songs were released that week, so the average download sale total was slightly higher (30,000 in 2011 vs. 26,000 in 2012). While song sales for the Glee premiere weeks of the third and fourth seasons are comparable, both heavily trail that of 2010's second-season premiere episode, the cast's five first-week singles totaled 409,000 in sales, led by "Empire State of Mind" (106,461).

Following the cast's cover of Imagine Dragons' "It's Time", the original version gained by 62% to 64,000 downloads sold, according to Nielsen SoundScan, and entered the Billboard Hot 100's top 40 for the first time in its fifteenth week on the chart, rising 49–33. Glee's version debuted at number 95 with 41,000 copies sold, and was the only one of the six singles released to chart. In Canada, "It's Time" was also the only single from the episode to chart on the Canadian Hot 100, and debuted at number 87, behind the Imagine Dragons original, which debuted the same week at number 69.

The Glee cast added to one of the Billboard Hot 100's most prominent records: "It's Time" is its 204th song to appear on the chart, which was launched the week of August 4, 1958. Lil Wayne and Elvis Presley are tied for the second most Billboard Hot 100 appearances at 108.
