= The Purple Piano Project =

- Glee episode
- Episode no.: Season 3 Episode 1
- Directed by: Eric Stoltz
- Written by: Brad Falchuk
- Production code: 3ARC01
- Original air date: September 20, 2011

Guest appearances
- Iqbal Theba as Principal Figgins; Dot-Marie Jones as Shannon Beiste; Josh Sussman as Jacob Ben Israel; Lauren Potter as Becky Jackson; Bill A. Jones as Rod Remington; Earlene Davis as Andrea Carmichael; Ashley Fink as Lauren Zizes; Lindsay Pearce as Harmony; Vanessa Lengies as Sugar Motta; LaMarcus Tinker as Shane Tinsley; Barbara Tarbuck as Nancy Bletheim; Caden Michael Gray as Gavroche

Episode chronology
← Previous "New York"	Next → "I Am Unicorn"
- Glee season 3

"The Purple Piano Project" is the premiere episode of the third season of the American musical television series Glee, and the forty-fifth overall. The episode was written by series co-creator Brad Falchuk, directed by Eric Stoltz, and first aired on September 20, 2011 on Fox in the United States. It features the start of a new school year at McKinley High, and for its glee club, New Directions. Members of the club have left, and a recruitment drive is launched to bring the numbers back up. Blaine Anderson (Darren Criss), Kurt Hummel's (Chris Colfer) boyfriend, transfers from Dalton Academy to McKinley High, Quinn Fabray (Dianna Agron) becomes rebellious and joins The Skanks, and Mercedes Jones (Amber Riley) gets a new boyfriend. Sue Sylvester (Jane Lynch) is running for Congress.

The episode received mixed-to-positive reviews, with favorable notice being taken of the renewed focus on the core characters, though there was a lack of overall enthusiasm from several reviewers. The subplot with Kurt and Rachel Berry (Lea Michele), and its introduction of Harmony (Lindsay Pearce), garnered praise for all three performers. The musical performances were generally well-received, and the "Anything Goes" / "Anything You Can Do" mash-up featuring Pearce was widely acclaimed. Five covers were released as singles, three of which charted on the Billboard Hot 100 and the Canadian Hot 100. Upon its initial airing, this episode was viewed by 9.21 million American viewers and garnered a 4.0/11 Nielsen rating/share in the 18–49 age group. The total viewership and ratings for this episode were down significantly from the previous episode, "New York".

== Plot ==
It is a new year at McKinley High. New Directions glee club director Will Schuester (Matthew Morrison) and guidance counselor Emma Pillsbury (Jayma Mays) are now in a relationship. Sue Sylvester (Jane Lynch), coach of the Cheerios cheerleading squad, is running for Congress but doing badly in the polls. Glee club member Mike Chang (Harry Shum, Jr.) is now a senior, while fellow members Tina Cohen-Chang (Jenna Ushkowitz) and Artie Abrams (Kevin McHale) are juniors. Club co-captain Finn Hudson (Cory Monteith), a senior, has no idea what to do about his future. Mercedes Jones (Amber Riley) has a new boyfriend (LaMarcus Tinker); her former boyfriend Sam Evans (Chord Overstreet) moved to another state. Dave Karofsky (Max Adler) transferred after being outed at McKinley. Three New Directions members have left: Sam, Lauren Zizes (Ashley Fink), who also broke up with Puck (Mark Salling), and Sam's ex-girlfriend Quinn Fabray (Dianna Agron), who has completely reinvented herself with pink hair, a nose ring and a tattoo; she has taken up smoking, and has made friends with a group of outcast girls called the Skanks. She refuses to rejoin either the Cheerios or New Directions.

To recruit new talent, Will places several purple pianos around the school and encourages the club to sing whenever they see one. When Mike and Tina play on one in a hallway, Sue interrupts them by snapping the piano strings with wire cutters, and is praised for doing so by an arts-hating teacher (Barbara Tarbuck), who promises to vote for her. An inspired Sue goes on television and vows that, if elected, she will cut all funding for school arts programs until all students read at or above grade level. She makes Santana Lopez (Naya Rivera) and Becky Jackson (Lauren Potter) cheerleading co-captains, to their mutual disgust, and gets their pledge to help her sabotage the glee club. After New Directions performs "We Got the Beat" in the cafeteria, Becky starts a food fight that targets the club. Following lunch, Sugar Motta (Vanessa Lengies) auditions, but cannot sing in tune. An agonized Will eventually rejects Sugar, but gains a new recruit when Kurt Hummel (Chris Colfer) convinces his boyfriend Blaine Anderson (Darren Criss) to transfer from Dalton Academy.

Kurt and Rachel see Emma about their plans to attend college in New York City. She suggests they consider a top school for the dramatic arts there, and the two of them attend an Ohio "mixer" for students interested in applying. They have rehearsed "Ding-Dong! The Witch Is Dead", and expect to overawe the other attendees with the performance, but are instead intimidated by their performance of an "Anything Goes" and "Anything You Can Do" mash-up led by Harmony (Lindsay Pearce). Although badly shaken, they vow to persevere.

Blaine sings "It's Not Unusual" to a large crowd in the school courtyard while a growing number of Cheerios, directed by Santana, join in as back-up dancers. As the number is ending, the Cheerios circle the purple piano, and they each sprinkle it with lighter fluid. Quinn flicks her lit cigarette onto the piano, and it bursts into flames. Will tells Santana that because of her sabotage she is banned from New Directions. Rachel breaks up the resulting pity party by singing the opening to "You Can't Stop the Beat", and they all perform the song in the auditorium, while Quinn secretly watches from above.

== Production ==
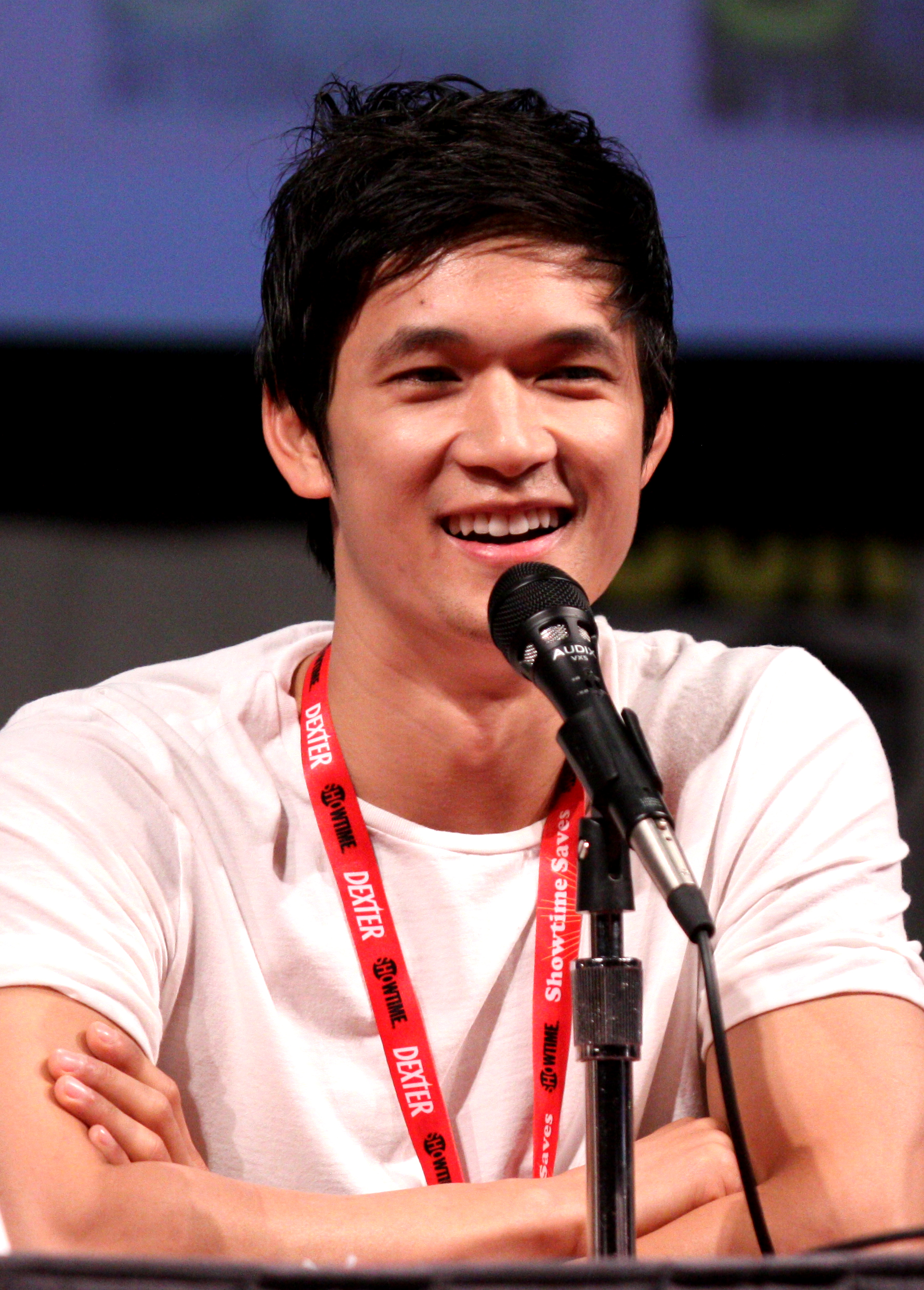
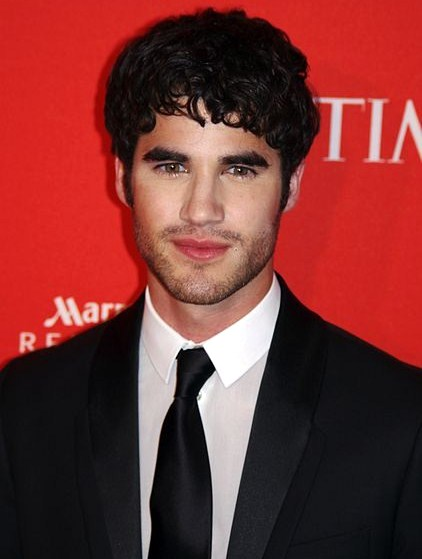
This episode marks the promotion of Harry Shum, Jr. (left) and Darren Criss (right) to the main cast from their previous guest-star status.

The first day of filming for the episode was August 9, 2011, though some cast members were called the day before to begin recording musical numbers. Murphy realized that The Glee Project runner-up Lindsay Pearce would be ideal for an already-written role in the episode, but the filming needed to take place before the project's finale was broadcast on August 21, 2011, upon which it would be revealed that she had won a two-episode prize. They "kept delaying" the shoot, and "snuck [her] into a soundstage to make sure no one recognized her." In aid of this secrecy, her name was omitted from the Fox press release for the episode. Once Murphy had cast Pearce, he made the musical number she was to appear in bigger. According to Lea Michele, the filming of the first episode ended on August 19, 2011.

Returning recurring characters that appear in the episode include ex-glee club member Lauren Zizes (Ashley Fink), Principal Figgins (Iqbal Theba), football coach Shannon Beiste (Dot-Marie Jones), cheerleader Becky Jackson (Lauren Potter), school reporter Jacob Ben Israel (Josh Sussman), and television anchors Rod Remington (Bill A. Jones) and Andrea Carmichael (Earlene Davis). Three new recurring characters were introduced: football player Shane (LaMarcus Tinker), who is the new boyfriend of Mercedes Jones (Amber Riley), Sugar Motta (Lengies) and Pearce as Harmony. Effective with this episode, former recurring guest stars Harry Shum, Jr. as Mike Chang and Darren Criss as Blaine Anderson join the main cast, while Jessalyn Gilsig and Mike O'Malley, who play Will's wife Terri Schuester and Kurt's father Burt Hummel respectively, are no longer given starring credits. Gilsig was in the main cast for the first two seasons, and her change had been previously reported. O'Malley's had not, but he is listed in the Fox press release for the second episode as being a guest star, his credit in the first season. Barbara Tarbuck guest starred as Nancy Bletheim, a geometry teacher at McKinley.

At the 2011 San Diego Comic-Con on July 24, 2011, series creator Brad Falchuk said that in the first episode of the third season, "The opening sequence is everybody saying what they want to do when they grow up, so you see everyone's anxieties." He also stated, "Come the first episode back, you see who the seniors and juniors are."

The episode features seven musical cover versions. Two are in the form of a mash-up of "Anything Goes" from the Cole Porter musical Anything Goes and "Anything You Can Do" from Irving Berlin's Annie Get Your Gun, with the lead sung by Pearce. The other five are "You Can't Stop the Beat" from the musical Hairspray and "We Got the Beat" by The Go-Gos, both performed by New Directions; "Ding-Dong! The Witch Is Dead" from the film The Wizard of Oz (as performed by Barbra Streisand and Harold Arlen from Streisand's Duets album), sung by Michele and Colfer; the Tom Jones song "It's Not Unusual" featuring Criss; and "Big Spender" from the musical Sweet Charity, performed by Lengies. All songs, except for "Big Spender," were released as singles, available for digital download.

== Reception ==
=== Ratings ===
"The Purple Piano Project" was first broadcast on September 20, 2011, in the United States on Fox. It garnered a 4.0/11 Nielsen rating/share in the 18–49 demographic, and received 9.21 million American viewers during its initial airing. It was beaten in its timeslot by the NCIS premiere on CBS, which garnered a 4.3/12 rating/share in the 18–49 demographic, and also by the premiere of the new show New Girl that followed Glee on Fox, which brought in a 4.8/12 rating/share and 10.27 million viewers. The Glee numbers were down by over 25% from the season two opener, "Audition", which was watched by 12.45 million American viewers and received a 5.6/16 rating/share, and down nearly as much from the season two finale, "New York", which attracted 11.80 million viewers and a 4.6/11 rating/share. However, with DVR numbers, the episode viewership increased to a total of 12.21 million viewers and a 5.3 18-49 rating.

In the UK, "The Purple Piano Project" premiered on digital subscription channel Sky1 with an overnight average of 639,000 viewers (2.8%), down by nearly 50% compared to the overnight rating of the season two finale, "New York", which aired on E4. Final ratings brought Glee up to 1.17 million viewers. It was the ninth-most watched show on cable for the week, down 55% from "New York" and 61% from "Audition", both of which were the top-ranked cable shows in their respective weeks of broadcast. The episode's Australian broadcast attained 760,000 viewers, which made Glee the twelfth most-watched program of the day, although viewership was down almost 30% from the 987,000 viewers of "New York". In Canada, 2.10 million viewers watched the episode, where it was the most-viewed show in its timeslot and outperformed its closest competitor by 183% in the 18–49 demographic. It was the tenth most-viewed show of the week, down three slots but up 16% from the 1.77 million who watched "New York".

=== Social media ===
The night the episode debuted, several topics related to the show appeared in the top ten trending topics on Twitter. At one point, Glee cast member Kevin McHale tweeted "5 TT's! Woo woo!", indicating that five of the top ten slots were filled by Glee-related topics. The Hollywood Reporter, in their story on the online reaction to the show, said that there were four of ten topics claimed by the debut rather than five: "#gleek", "Kurt and Rachel", "Sue Sylvester" and "Warblers".

Twitter was also used to advertise the show. To highlight the beginning of the third season and its move to a new channel, Sky was the first company to use Twitter's geographically targeted ad capability in the UK with a "promoted trend" that was displayed on September 22, 2011, the day that Glee debuted on Sky1.

=== Critical response ===
"The Purple Piano Project" was given mixed to positive reviews by critics. Jenna Mullins of E! Online called it "a perfect season-starter of an episode". The Atlantic's Kevin Fallon appreciated that it tackled some of the show's biggest problems, such as the surfeit of central characters and their previously un-addressed ages. He was particularly pleased that the episode focused on typical high school life, rather than the adult characters or more serious issues. Bobby Hankinson of the Houston Chronicle approved of the "clear trajectory" set out for the characters, and noted that he looked forward to seeing their various storylines develop. Though AOLTV's Crystal Bell worried that clarifying the teenagers' ages could result in the younger characters being overlooked in future episodes, she was glad that the premiere saw the show return to its roots: "underdogs, show tunes and Sue Sylvester". A similar sentiment was expressed by Amy Reiter of the Los Angeles Times, who was hopeful that renewed focus on the core characters would lead to "a great year". The Huffington Post's Amy Lee observed that "Glee has a tendency to oscillate between sappy and nasty, sometimes without any warning", and then noted that "The Purple Piano Project" was more tonally balanced than the majority of the second season. Anthony Benigno of The Faster Times deemed the episode "admirably straightforward", unmarred by the sentimentality and inconsistencies which plagued previous episodes. His praise was tempered, however, and he wrote, "I wouldn't go so far as to call the episode good, it was oddly lifeless and the stakes seemed almost non-existent at times. It has the feel of a show rediscovering itself, but all things considered, Ryan Murphy and Co. handled the task relatively well."

James Poniewozik of Time took a more negative stance. He wrote that "The Purple Piano Project" "was not a particularly good episode of Glee", one which was hindered by the vast number of central characters, "but it did at least suggest where the third season of the show could find its strong core stories, and also ... the numerous ways in which it could get sidetracked into tangential ridiculousness." Emily St. James of The A.V. Club graded the episode "D+". She summarised it as "a handful of okay performances, one or two pretty good lines, and then a whole bunch of awful". Rolling Stone's Erica Futterman praised the episode's humor and plot development, but commented that it "didn't hit any of the emotional notes Glee is capable of." Robert Canning of IGN rated it an "okay" 6.5 out of 10. He too found "there were still quite a few laughs to be had", but felt the episode suffered from its repetitiveness, as Sue's hatred of the glee club and New Directions' recruitment problems have been thoroughly explored before. The Dallas Morning News's Samantha Urban noted that Murphy failed to deliver on his promise to increase Mercedes and Tina's roles, and couldn't accept that Sue would be allowed to promote her congressional campaign on her local news commentary spot, but overall was "pretty impressed" with what she called "a solid episode of Glee that made [her] feel cautiously optimistic about the season ahead." Lisa Respers France of CNN summed up the episode in a single word: "Meh."

"The episode's most intriguing development ... was the revelation that new characters such as the Aspergers' exploiter and the eccentric, funny, super-talented kids who performed the medley could hold my attention as strongly as the original cast of Glee. If Murphy, Brennan and Falchuk are clever enough, they could start integrating new freshmen and sophomores into the existing cast, and make them so lively and distinctive that when the founding characters graduate—as they eventually must—we won't think that Glee is overstaying its welcome by continuing to produce new episodes."

— Matt Zoller Seitz of Salon.com on "The Purple Piano Project" as it bodes for Glee's future.

The plot which involved Rachel and Kurt attracted uniformly favorable reviews. Fallon called it "one of the episode's strongest subplots", and Salon.com's Matt Zoller Seitz deemed it the episode's "most successful and affecting." Bell named Rachel and Kurt as her favorite Glee pairing, and Futterman wrote that their "friendship has grown from something catty into something genuine and relatable and their interactions are likely the most authentic for any aspiring musical theater performers among Glee's viewers." Within her generally negative review of the episode, St. James noted that the NYADA mixer scene "features some of the best work Chris Colfer and Lea Michele have contributed to the show." In contrast, the adult storylines were generally poorly received. Zoller Seitz branded Will and Emma's relationship boring, and Abby West of Entertainment Weekly disliked the fact the season began with them in an established relationship: "I feel like I missed a huge leap for Emma and we need to have it acknowledged." Fallon disparaged Will as being "insufferable", and attributed this to "Morrison's wooden characterization, the stilted writing [and] the flat purpose that the character serves on the show". Sue's storyline was described as nonsensical by St. James, who wrote that she "has decided to take her crusade against the glee club to a congressional district-wide audience, because, well, she was the most popular character in season one, and she will be again, via blunt force, if necessary." Reiter, however, found Sue to be "in perfect form in this episode, neither too mean nor too misty", and enjoyed her storyline.

The introduction of Harmony and Sugar garnered critical praise. St. James wrote that the former "may be the best new character ever", TVLine's Michael Slezak said she was "brilliantly brought to life" by Pearce, and Fallon felt that her arrival boded well for the introductions of the other finalists from The Glee Project. He said that "she brought, which the best new characters do, fresh and exciting aspects in the show's established leads. Zoller Seitz described Sugar as "an entitled little snot", but a "great character" nonetheless, and one he hoped to see more of. West praised Lengies' performance and opined that with Sue otherwise occupied, "it'll be great to have another person as a thorn in the Glee club's side." Not everyone was thrilled with Sugar's advent, however; St. James called the character "awful".

=== Music and performances ===
The episode's musical numbers were generally well received. Hankinson appreciated that they "felt to proper scale", with a realism which the previous season's "over-the-top" performances lacked. Though Benigno criticized the song selection for being too focused on Broadway tracks, which he felt limited its appeal for younger viewers, Urban called the choices "outstanding" and St. James commented that the wide range represented progress from season two. She noted that there were no performances she disliked, but found some "shockingly poorly motivated for dramatic purposes". Canning enjoyed the songs both vocally and visually: "Everything was upbeat, familiar and fun. The dancing was entertaining and most of the performances were group numbers, which added plenty of visual flair."

"We Got the Beat" garnered praise for Brittany and Mike's dancing from Lee, though she described the vocals as AutoTuned, a comment echoed by Futterman, who was nevertheless glad that Brittany and Rachel "match[ed] the rawness of Santana's voice". Slezak and Benigno were pleased that Morris and Rivera received lead vocals, but while the former commended the number as a great musical start to the season and awarded it an "A" grade, the latter found it hard to differentiate between the Glee cover and the original, observed that it failed to advance the plot, and graded it "C". Respers France was entirely unimpressed with the routine. For her, Sugar's scene following it was one of the episode's few highlights, although she described Sugar as having "a horrible voice".

Rachel and Kurt's duet of "Ding-Dong! The Witch Is Dead" made Billboard's Rae Votta long for them to share more material. It encapsulated everything Futterman wanted in a duet between the two; she observed "it's effortless, charming, full of power musical theater vocals and Rachel gets to channel Barbra Streisand". Lee, however, felt the number was an odd choice to demonstrate their talent, and although Slezak graded it a "B", he contrasted it negatively with their previous duets. West opined that the song was too insubstantial and gave it a "B−". Its highest grade, an "A−", came from Benigno. He noted its lack of significance to the plot and wished that the vocal split had not been so strongly in Michele's favor, but called it "a fun, infectious number."

Criss's performance of "It's Not Unusual" attracted comparisons to comical renditions of the number in The Fresh Prince of Bel-Air, but earned an "A" from West regardless. Fallon said the routine was "embarrassingly enjoyable" and lauded Criss's screen presence, and Benigno called it a "wonderful performance", but felt it was hampered by the simplicity of the arrangement and gave it a "B+". Futterman and Slezak both generally like Blaine as a lead vocalist, but felt the song was not his best: Futterman wrote that "some of the belting felt strained and the energy a little forced", and Slezak awarded the song a "B−".

The "Anything Goes" / "Anything You Can Do" mash-up was widely acclaimed. Respers France named Pearce's performance the best moment of the episode, and found that the character positively reminded her of "Glee of old". The song was also a favorite of Lee's, who wrote that the intensity of the actress was perfectly matched to the character's disposition. West, Slezak and Benigno gave the performance an "A"; the former called it an "outstanding rendition" which "felt like it belonged on a big stage or in a big-screen musical", and the latter two praised her vocal talent, which Benigno deemed unequalled on Glee. Futterman and Bell found Harmony a credible rival to Rachel vocally, and eagerly anticipated future competition between them. Urban called Pearce's performance merely "serviceable". Though she felt her acting was a weak point, she compared her favorably to season two guest star Jake Zyrus and praised her vocals. Criticism came from New York's Lindy West, who did not understand Rachel's humiliation, as New Directions "sing way more elaborate and equally competent arrangements four to five times an episode". She elaborated, "This is a thing that drives me crazy about Glee. As a viewer, there's no knowing whether a performance was 'good' like 'Anything Goes,' or 'bad' like 'We've Got the Beat,' until Rachel starts crying or some cheerleader starts throwing spaghetti."

"You Can't Stop the Beat" was called a "perfect ending to a perfect season premiere" by Mullins. Futterman described it as a "standard Glee episode finale, full of inspiration and importance for the future, and catchy as all hell." Slezak enjoyed Rachel's slow opening verse, said the full performance "felt a lot like the shiny, happy Glee of yore" and gave it an "A−" as did Benigno, who also found it a typical final number but was less enthused by the familiarity. Votta's only disappointment with the rendition was that the televised version did not include the "adorable duet" between Kurt and Artie that is present on the single.

=== Chart history ===
Three of the five cover versions released as singles debuted on the Billboard Hot 100: "It's Not Unusual" at number sixty-five with 40,000 in sales, "You Can't Stop The Beat" at number sixty-seven, and "We've Got the Beat" at number eighty-three. On the Canadian Hot 100, "You Can't Stop The Beat" charted highest at number sixty-five, with "It's Not Unusual" at number seventy-five, and "We've Got the Beat" at number eighty-three. Neither "Ding-Dong! The Witch Is Dead" nor the "Anything Goes" / "Anything You Can Do" mash-up charted on the Hot 100 in either country, though in the US each track sold 21,000 downloads, and were in second and third place respectively on the Hot 100 "Bubbling Under" chart. Total US sales for the five cover versions were 149,000, compared to 409,000 in sales for the five singles from the season two opener, "Audition", in their first week; for that episode, all five singles made the Hot 100, and charted between numbers twenty-one and fifty-one.
