= Theatricality =

- Glee episode
- Episode no.: Season 1 Episode 20
- Directed by: Ryan Murphy
- Written by: Ryan Murphy
- Production code: 1ARC20
- Original air date: May 25, 2010

Guest appearances
- Idina Menzel as Shelby Corcoran; Iqbal Theba as Principal Figgins; Mike O'Malley as Burt Hummel; Romy Rosemont as Carole Hudson; Naya Rivera as Santana Lopez; Max Adler as Dave Karofsky; Josh Sussman as Jacob Ben Israel; James Earl as Azimio; Heather Morris as Brittany Pierce; Harry Shum, Jr. as Mike Chang; Dijon Talton as Matt Rutherford; Ashley Fink as Lauren Zizes

Episode chronology
← Previous "Dream On"	Next → "Funk"
- Glee season 1

"Theatricality" is the twentieth episode of the American television series Glee. The episode was written and directed by series creator Ryan Murphy, and premiered on the Fox network on May 25, 2010.

In "Theatricality", glee club member Tina Cohen-Chang (Jenna Ushkowitz) has an identity crisis. The female club members and Kurt (Chris Colfer) pay tribute to Lady Gaga, performing in a selection of her costumes, while the rest of the male club members perform as Kiss. Rachel (Lea Michele) meets her mother Shelby (Idina Menzel), the coach of rival glee club Vocal Adrenaline, and Finn (Cory Monteith) and his mother move in with Kurt and his father, leading to a confrontation between Kurt and Finn, and Finn continuing to control Kurt about keeping his sexuality away from him, and using scare tactics to keep Kurt away. The episode features cover versions of five songs, all of which were released as singles, available for digital download, and three of which are included on the soundtrack album Glee: The Music, Volume 3 Showstoppers.

"Theatricality" was watched by 11.5 million American viewers and received generally positive reviews from critics. Tim Stack of Entertainment Weekly deemed it one of his favorite episodes of the season, and both Terri Schwartz of MTV and CNN's Lisa Respers France compared it positively to the Madonna tribute episode, "The Power of Madonna". O'Malley's acting and the Kurt and Finn storyline attracted critical praise, although Jarett Wieselman of the New York Post felt that similar scenes between Kurt and Burt were becoming increasingly frequent, diminishing their impact. BuddyTV's Henrik Batallones and Mary Hanrahan of Broadway World highlighted pacing issues with the Rachel storyline, and Hanrahan and Kevin Coll of Fused Film criticized the use of "Poker Face" as a mother–daughter duet.

== Plot ==
Principal Figgins (Iqbal Theba) informs Tina (Jenna Ushkowitz) that she can no longer dress as a goth, alarmed by a spate of pseudo-vampirism in the school, inspired by the Twilight series. She briefly changes her style, before dressing as a vampire and convincing Figgins that if he does not allow her to wear her preferred clothes, her vicious Asian vampire father will bite him.

Rachel (Lea Michele) discovers that rival glee club Vocal Adrenaline is planning on performing a Lady Gaga number at Regionals, so glee club director Will Schuester (Matthew Morrison) sets the club a Gaga assignment. The girls and Kurt (Chris Colfer) create costumes inspired by Lady Gaga and perform "Bad Romance". The rest of the male club members, unwilling to do a Gaga number, dress as Kiss and perform "Shout It Out Loud". Puck (Mark Salling) suggests to Quinn (Dianna Agron) that they name their daughter Jackie Daniels, as in Jack Daniel's. Later, in an attempt to show her he is serious about being a father, he does another Kiss song with the guys, "Beth", and suggests that Quinn give that name to their daughter. Quinn agrees that he can be present at her birth.

While spying on a Vocal Adrenaline rehearsal, Rachel shockingly realizes that their director, Shelby Corcoran (Idina Menzel), is her biological mother. She introduces herself, and Shelby makes her a better Lady Gaga costume. Will meets with Shelby, concerned that she is not as invested in forging a relationship as Rachel is. Shelby confesses that she can no longer have children, but wishes she could have her baby back, rather than the now fully grown Rachel, whom she feels does not need her. She tells Rachel that instead of trying to act like mother and daughter, they should just be grateful that they have met, and maintain their distance. Rachel hugs her goodbye, and they duet on an acoustic version of "Poker Face".

Kurt's father Burt Hummel (Mike O'Malley) invites Finn (Cory Monteith) and his mother Carole Hudson (Romy Rosemont) to move in with them. Finn feels awkward sharing a room with Kurt, who had a small crush on him. Kurt wants to show interest and asks Finn about his decorations in the basement. Finn continues bullying Kurt about his sexuality, and during an argument insults several items in his bedroom as being "faggy" after losing his temper. Burt overhears this and punishes Finn for bullying Kurt by using that term by dismissing him from the house, even if it costs Burt his relationship with Carole. Finn tries to apologize to Kurt, but he refuses to accept his apology. Kurt is bullied for his Gaga costume by football players Dave Karofsky (Max Adler) and Azimio (James Earl). Finn creates his own costume out of a shower curtain, and tells them he will not let them hurt Kurt, backed by the rest of the glee club. Meanwhile, at the end of the episode, while Figgins walks out of the office, he has an illusion that Tina is really a vampire, and threatens to kill him if he doesn't let her wear her usual clothing.

== Production ==
"Theatricality" was originally intended to air on June 1, 2010, but was switched in the schedule with the episode "Funk". The impetus for the Lady Gaga tribute comes from Tina's conflict, with Ushkowitz explaining that the storyline reflects Tina "slowly coming out of her box. Making her way out of her shell." As well as allowing Glee the rights to her songs, Lady Gaga also loaned the series her costume designer to recreate her signature looks. Series creator Ryan Murphy, who also directed the episode, stated that, because of the elaborate staging and costuming, the performance of "Bad Romance" was the show's most expensive number to date. "Bad Romance" took six hours to film, with Murphy describing it as "big and athletic and hard." Michele damaged her knee from exertion during the performance. In a statement released to Entertainment Weekly, Gaga eagerly anticipated the covers of her songs: "I love Glee. I love the cast and the creativity of the writers. I went to a musical theatre school, and used to dream that someday the students would be singing my songs. Can’t wait for "Bad Romance" + "Poker Face" in Glee fashion!"

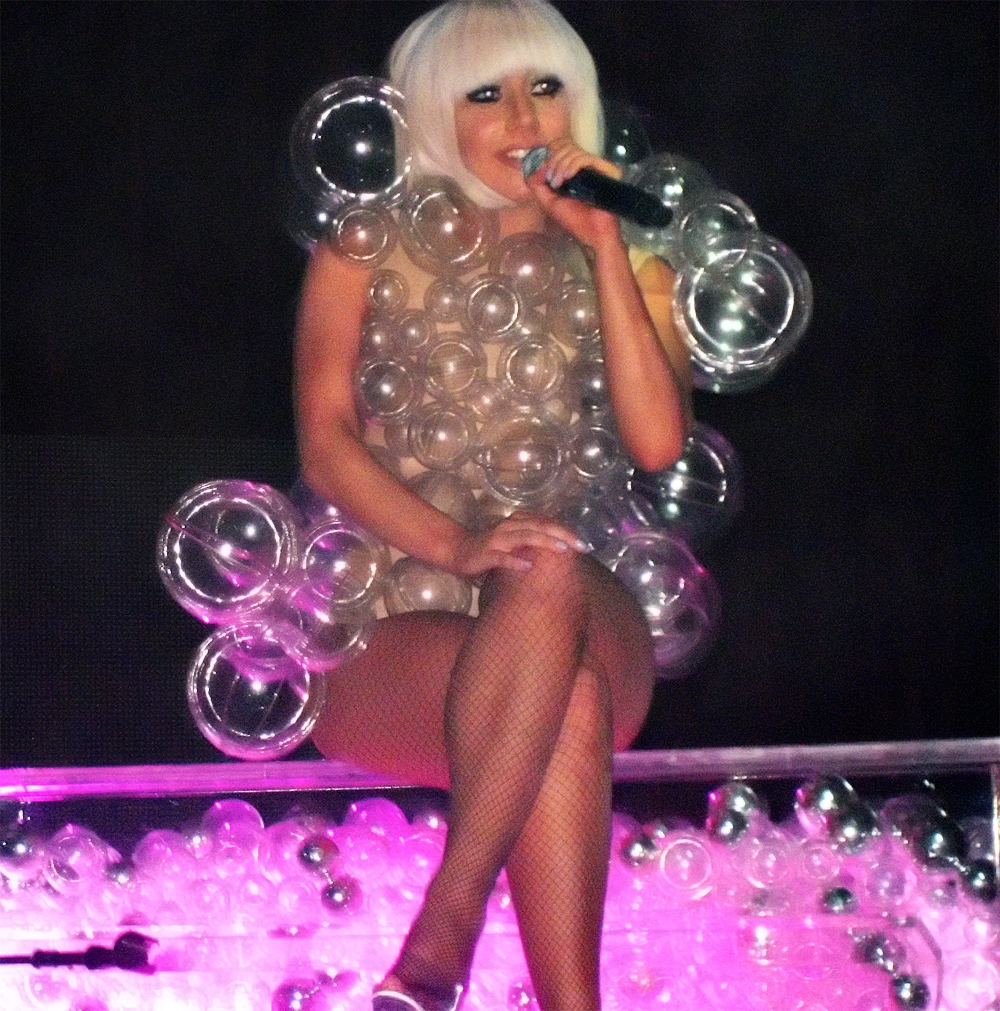
Tina's costume in "Theatricality" is based on Lady Gaga's Haus of Gaga bubble dress.

Glee's costume designer Lou Eyrich deemed the episode a tribute to Lady Gaga's "genius", explaining that the costumes the characters wear are not exact replicas of Gaga's, giving the impression the glee club members made them themselves. Rachel wears two dresses, the first inspired by Gaga's Kermit the Frog dress and the second based on Gaga's silver mirrored triangle dress. Murphy selected Tina to wear the Hussein Chalayan–inspired bubble dress, which Eyrich adapted into a vest to make it easier to take on and off. Kurt's costume is inspired by the Alexander McQueen outfit Gaga wears in the "Bad Romance" video, described by Colfer as "George Washington meets an Oceanic whale disco ball type thing". Eyrich strove for authenticity in replicating McQueen's ten-inch 'Armadillo' platforms. She was unable to buy a pair to fit Colfer, as they were not made in large enough sizes. Quinn wears the Armani Privé orbit dress Gaga wore to the 52nd Grammy Awards, fitted around her pregnant stomach. The most complicated costume was the Philip Treacy lobster hat, worn by Brittany (Heather Morris), as to get it to stay in place during the "Bad Romance" dance, Eyrich had to build a Buckram orb which could be safety–pinned on her head, then solder steel tentacles onto the sphere. It took 45 minutes to get the hat on and off Morris each day, and restricted her vision to what was directly in front of her. In solidarity with Kurt, Finn wears a vinyl floor–length red dress, based on the latex Atsuko Kudo dress Gaga wore to meet Elizabeth II. Mercedes wears a glittery bodysuit and a purple hair bow and wig, and Santana wears the Jeffrey Bryant lace bodysuit, and black rose Charlie Le Mindu hat, with lace airbrushed onto her face. As mentioned in the episode, members of Vocal Adrenaline wear red Chantilly lace full-body outfits and headpieces (as well as blonde wigs) inspired by the Fall 1998 Alexander McQueen dress Gaga wore whilst accepting her award for Best New Artist at the 2009 MTV Video Music Awards.

The episode includes an acoustic performance of Lady Gaga's "Poker Face", performed by Rachel and her mother Shelby. Menzel explained that the sexual meaning of the song is different in the context of the show, calling it "actually very simple and truthful." The male glee club members, except Kurt, perform "Beth" and "Shout It Out Loud" by Kiss, while Shelby also sings "Funny Girl" from the film of the same name. "Speechless" was featured as background music in the scene where Finn wiped off his Kiss makeup while Kurt fixes his outfit. All of the songs performed in the episode were released as singles, available for digital download. "Poker Face" and "Beth" are included on the deluxe edition of the soundtrack album Glee: The Music, Volume 3 Showstoppers, while "Bad Romance" is included on both the deluxe and standard editions of the album. "Bad Romance" charted at number 91 in Australia, 46 in Canada, 10 in Ireland, 59 in the United Kingdom, and 54 in the United States, while "Poker Face" charted at number 26 in Canada, 16 in Ireland, 70 in the United Kingdom, and 20 in the United States.

Recurring guest star Mike O'Malley appears in the episode as Kurt's father Burt, sharing a scene with Colfer and Monteith which Colfer has described as the most emotional scene of the series thus far, explaining: "Reading it on paper I had no idea it was going to be that intense. Once I got into it, then I kind of realised, 'Oh, there's such a bigger meaning behind this. Oh my God, this is so dramatic'." Colfer called "Theatricality" his favorite episode of the whole series. Other recurring characters who appear in "Theatricality" are glee club members Santana Lopez (Naya Rivera), Brittany Pierce (Heather Morris), Mike Chang (Harry Shum, Jr.) and Matt Rutherford (Dijon Talton, who gets his first lines in this episode), school reporter Jacob Ben Israel (Josh Sussman), school athletes and bullies Karofsky and Azimio, Principal Figgins, Vocal Adrenaline coach Shelby Corcoran and Finn's mother Carole Hudson.

== Reception ==
=== Ratings ===
In its original broadcast, "Theatricality" was watched by 11.5 million American viewers, and led in the 18–49 demographic in its timeslot, attaining a 4.8 Nielsen rating. It was the fifth most-watched show of the week in the 18-49 demographic, and the twelfth amongst all viewers. In the United Kingdom, the episode was watched by 862,000 viewers, its lowest audience of the season. "Theatricality" was watched by 1.91 million Canadian viewers, and was the eleventh most-watched program of the week in Canada. In Australia, the episode drew Glee's highest ever overnight ratings, watched by 1.41 million viewers and leading in all key demographics in its time slot.

=== Critical response ===
Following the episode's original broadcast, "Asian Vampires" became the fifth most discussed topic on the social networking website Twitter, in reference to Tina's storyline. Lady Gaga praised the episode, calling it "amazing". Entertainment Weekly's Tim Stack deemed "Theatricality" one of his favorite episodes of the season, writing: "it does what Glee does best which is combining comedy, music, and emotional truths." Stack praised the Kurt and Finn plot-line, calling the scene between them and Burt "one of Glee's greatest moments ever." Terri Schwartz of MTV also reviewed the episode positively, writing that it topped the previous episode, "Dream On", and rivaled the grandeur of the Madonna tribute episode "The Power of Madonna". CNN's Lisa Respers France deemed "Theatricality" even better than the Madonna episode, calling it "the perfect, over-the-top homage to an artist who is pretty over-the-top herself", and writing that Glee "just keeps getting better and better." Eric Goldman of IGN rated the episode 8.3/10 for "Impressive", and felt that there was "a lot to enjoy", with "some very fun material mixed in with one of the heaviest scenes Glee has delved into."

Bobby Hankinson of the Houston Chronicle called the episode "pretty great", also praising O'Malley's acting and noting: "I was impressed with how visceral the confrontation between Kurt's dad and Finn got and how the writers kept the language as raw as the emotions." The A.V. Club's Emily VanDerWerff graded the episode B+. She called the Rachel and Shelby storyline "very well-handled, another emotional story that the series is mostly nailing the execution of", and opined: "Chris Colfer and Mike O'Malley (always good together) brought out the best in Cory Monteith, who sometimes struggles with the weightier stuff." Overall, VanDerWerff felt that "Theatricality" was not as good as the preceding episode, but contained some well-executed moments and many funny lines. James Poniewozik of Time was "pleasantly surprised" by the episode, praising the Kurt/Finn and Rachel/Shelby story lines; however, he found the Tina, Quinn and Puck subplots "ridiculous and dispensable."

Henrik Batallones of BuddyTV felt that "Theatricality" was a "pretty strong, albeit not perfect, episode", deeming O'Malley the star of the show. Batallones criticized the Rachel and Shelby story line, however, suggesting that it was rushed and would have been better stretched out across the remainder of the season. Mary Hanrahan of Broadway World also felt that the Rachel and Shelby plot was rushed, calling it "sloppily handled". She criticized the performance of "Bad Romance", additionally noting that "Poker Face" did not work in the context of a mother–daughter duet. Hanrahan commented that she was tired of "themed episodes" of Glee, concluding that the episode: "fails on a lot of levels, and has actually made the episodes preceding it look better as a result." Kevin Coll of Fused Film criticized the selection of "Poker Face", noting that it was well done, but badly matched with the scene and storyline.
