= Hell-O (Glee) =

- Glee episode
- Episode no.: Season 1 Episode 14
- Directed by: Brad Falchuk
- Written by: Ian Brennan
- Production code: 1ARC13
- Original air date: April 13, 2010

Guest appearances
- Jonathan Groff as Jesse St. James; Idina Menzel as Shelby Corcoran; Iqbal Theba as Principal Figgins; Patrick Gallagher as Ken Tanaka; Naya Rivera as Santana Lopez; James Earl as Azimio; Josh Sussman as Jacob Ben Israel; Max Adler as Dave Karofsky; Heather Morris as Brittany Pierce; Harry Shum Jr. as Mike Chang; Dijon Talton as Matt Rutherford; Ashley Fink as Lauren Zizes

Episode chronology
← Previous "Sectionals"	Next → "The Power of Madonna"
- Glee season 1

"Hell-O" is the fourteenth episode of the American television series Glee. The episode premiered on the Fox network on April 13, 2010. It was written by series creator Ian Brennan and directed by Brad Falchuk. In "Hell-O", cheer-leading coach Sue Sylvester (Jane Lynch) attempts to sabotage the relationship between glee club members Finn Hudson (Cory Monteith) and Rachel Berry (Lea Michele). Glee club director Will Schuester (Matthew Morrison) attempts to begin a relationship with school guidance counsellor Emma Pillsbury (Jayma Mays), but several obstacles come between them, including the coach of rival glee club Vocal Adrenaline.

"Hell-O" introduces special guest stars Idina Menzel as Shelby Corcoran, the coach of Vocal Adrenaline, and Jonathan Groff as Jesse St. James, the group's lead singer. Glee fans had previously lobbied for Menzel to be cast as Rachel's biological mother. The episode features cover versions of six songs, five of which were released as singles, available for digital download.

The episode was watched by 13.66 million American viewers, making it the second-highest-rated episode of the entire series, after the season 2 post-Super Bowl XLV episode "The Sue Sylvester Shuffle", and received mixed reviews from television critics. Vanity Fair's Brett Berk and the Houston Chronicle's Bobby Hankinson felt the episode was haphazard and uneven, while IGN's Eric Goldman observed that "Hell-O" reset the events of the preceding episode "Sectionals", and in doing so felt rushed. David Hinckley of the Daily News agreed with this assessment, but felt that resetting character development was a positive move in the long term.

== Plot ==
Following the suspension from her position at William McKinley High School, cheer-leading coach Sue Sylvester (Jane Lynch) blackmails Principal Figgins (Iqbal Theba), slipping him a date rape drug and taking an incriminating photograph of them in a compromising position. He allows her to return to work at the school, where she immediately returns to plotting to bring down New Directions. Finn Hudson (Cory Monteith) and Rachel Berry (Lea Michele) are now dating, although Finn still is not over his ex-girlfriend Quinn Fabray (Dianna Agron). He expresses his feelings through a performance of the Doors' "Hello, I Love You" as part of the week assignment of performing songs with the word "Hello" in the title.

Sue enlists cheerleaders Santana Lopez (Naya Rivera) and Brittany Pierce (Heather Morris) to seduce Finn. He breaks up with Rachel, who angrily sings "Gives You Hell" in retaliation, and goes on a date with both Brittany and Santana, but comes to the realization that he does want to be with Rachel. In the interim, Rachel meets Jesse St. James (Jonathan Groff), the lead singer of New Directions' rival glee club Vocal Adrenaline, at a local music library. The two perform an impromptu duet of Lionel Richie's "Hello", and Rachel becomes enamoured with him. Eventually, the New Directions members learn about the blossoming relationship and conclude that Jesse is using Rachel, and threaten to expel her from the club unless she breaks up with him. Rachel asks Jesse to keep their relationship a secret and turns Finn down when he asks her to get back together with him.

Glee club director Will Schuester (Matthew Morrison) begins dating guidance counselor Emma Pillsbury (Jayma Mays). Emma suffers from mysophobia and is uncomfortable kissing Will. She admits that she is still a virgin, and requests that they take their relationship slowly. While dancing, Will sings Neil Diamond's "Hello Again" to her. When Emma is preparing dinner for Will several nights later, his ex-wife Terri Schuester (Jessalyn Gilsig) arrives at the apartment, and tells Emma that she and Will danced to "Hello Again" at their prom in 1993, leaving Emma distressed.

On a visit to Carmel High School, Will meets Shelby Corcoran (Idina Menzel), the coach of Vocal Adrenaline, while she has the club perform a rendition of "Highway to Hell". She flirts with Will and eventually seduces him. However, Will is unable to continue and tells her about his relationship problems. Shelby suggests that as Will had been with Terri since he was 15 and has immediately moved on to a new relationship, he ought to take some time out for himself. She later observes as Jesse and Rachel kiss, and exchanges knowing looks with Jesse.

When Emma later confronts Will with a copy of his high school yearbook, confirming that "Hello Again" was his and Terri's song, he is apologetic. He and Emma decide to put their relationship on hold in order to deal with their separate issues. New Directions performs "Hello, Goodbye", with Emma watching.

== Production ==
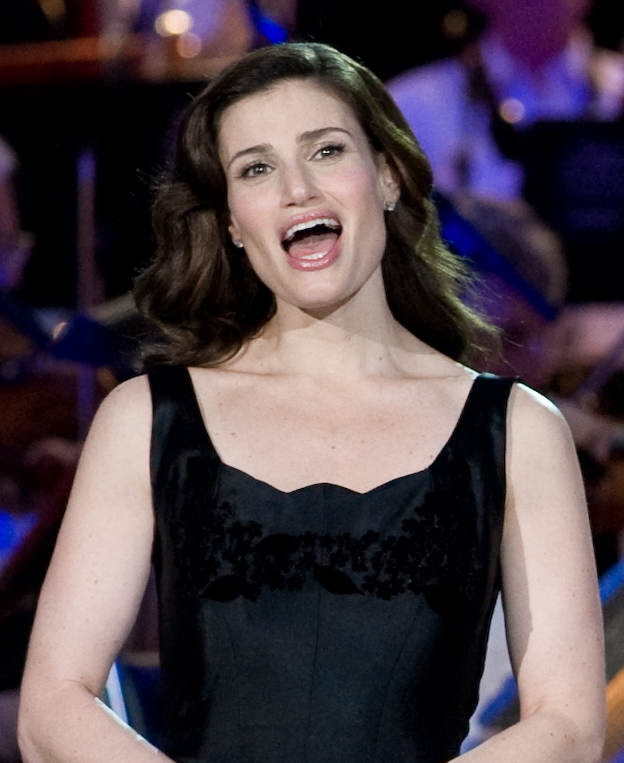
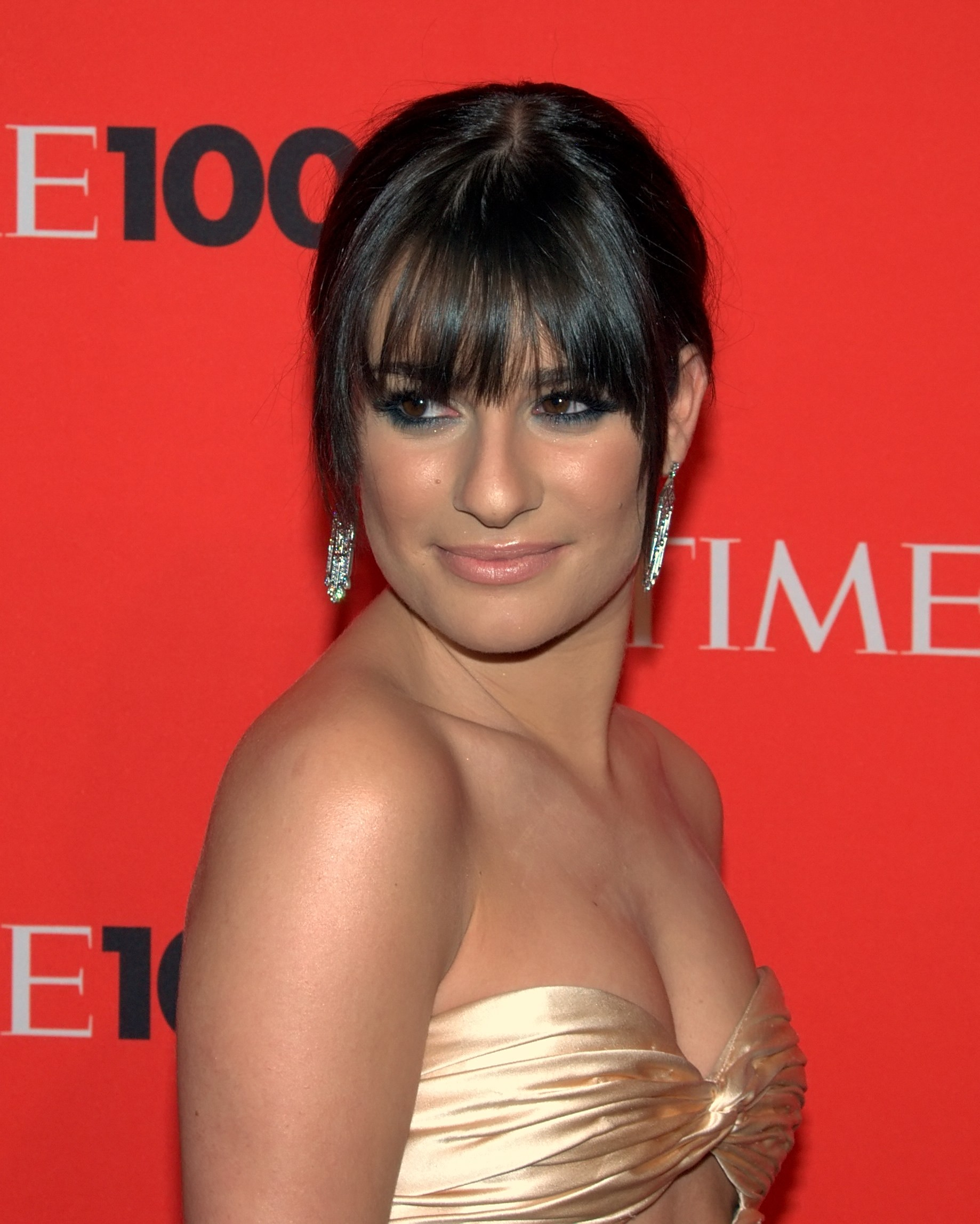
Idina Menzel (left) was cast in Glee following a fan campaign based on her resemblance to Lea Michele (right).

Glee was originally commissioned by Fox for a thirteen-episode run, culminating with "Sectionals". On September 21, 2009, the network announced an extension of the first season, ordering a further nine episodes, of which "Hell-O" is the first. The episode's airdate was set for April 13, 2010, with the announcement made that Glee would move from Wednesdays to the 9:00 pm Tuesday time-slot. However, due to a scheduling conflict with American Idol, Glee's return was pushed back to 9:30 pm, and then later to 9:28 pm for "Hell-O", before moving to the earlier timeslot from the next episode, "The Power of Madonna", onwards. "Hell-O" was written by Ian Brennan and directed by Brad Falchuk. It was exclusively screened for the first time for around 2,000 Glee fans at the Paley Festival on March 13, 2010, which was Paley's largest ever audience.

During its initial run of episodes, Glee fans lobbied for Broadway actress Idina Menzel to be cast as the biological mother of Rachel Berry, due to the strong resemblance between Menzel and Michele. On December 17, 2009, series creator Ryan Murphy commented that he had met with Menzel, but had not yet decided upon a role for her. The actress was ultimately cast as the coach of rival glee club Vocal Adrenaline, with Murphy comparing her character to Faye Dunaway's character Diana Christensen in Network. Menzel makes her first appearance in "Hell-O". The episode also introduces Groff as Jesse St. James, the lead singer of Vocal Adrenaline, and Rachel's new love-interest.

"Hell-O" features cover versions of six songs, five of which were released as singles, available for digital download. Monteith performs the Doors' "Hello, I Love You", Michele sings "Gives You Hell" by the All-American Rejects, Michele and Groff duet on Lionel Richie's "Hello", Jesse and Vocal Adrenaline perform AC/DC's "Highway to Hell", and New Directions sing "Hello, Goodbye" by The Beatles. Each of these songs were released as singles. The episode also includes Morrison performing Neil Diamond's "Hello Again". Diamond previously licensed his song "Sweet Caroline" for use in the Glee episode "Mash-Up". He experienced some trepidation over the decision, and retracted clearance after the performance had already been recorded. Glee's music supervisor P.J. Bloom was able to convince him to reverse his decision, and Diamond went on to also license Glee the song "Hello Again". "Gives You Hell" charted at number one on the Irish Singles Chart, while "Hello, Goodbye" reached number 45.

A scene with Rachel and Jesse that included a performance of the song "Montage, Part 1: Hello Twelve, Hello Thirteen, Hello Love" from A Chorus Line was filmed for the episode, but was cut before it aired. Over two years later, on August 3, 2012, Murphy uploaded the complete scene to his YouTube page. An instrumental version of the song was played in the following episode, "The Power of Madonna", as background in the scene near the beginning in which Rachel and Jesse were making out.

== Reception ==
=== Ratings ===
In its original broadcast, "Hell-O" was watched by 13.66 million American viewers and attained a 5.6/15 rating/share in the 18-49 demographic. This was a 46 percent increase on Glee's previous series high, and made it the most watched episode of the series since its premiere. In Canada, Glee was the ninth most-watched show of the week, bringing in 2.12 million viewers. In the United Kingdom, "Hell-O" also attained Glee's ratings high at the time. It was watched by 2.041 million viewers, and was the second most-watched show of the week on the non-terrestrial channels, beaten only by the Sky News general election debate. In Australia, Glee again attained a new ratings high, watched by 1.27 million viewers, making "Hell-O" the 17th most-viewed program of the week.

=== Critical response ===
The episode received mixed reviews from critics. Lisa Respers France of CNN was pleased with the series' return, and praised the "drama, treachery, tension, romance, and best of all, the diabolical deliciousness that is Cheerio coach Sue Sylvester." Emily VanDerWerff of The A.V. Club graded the episode "A−". She felt that "Hell-O" had "clumsy moments" but overall found it "a vastly enjoyable hour of television, reintroducing a show that's starting to realize just how far it can go."

IGN's Eric Goldman rated the episode 8.5/10. He commented that in resetting the events of "Sectionals", it "felt a bit rushed", but concluded: "Glee continues to work because it has its cake and eats it too. It's an over the top, overly cheerful musical – but also a biting comedy that always winks at the audience and acknowledges how cheesy musical theater can be, even while also proving how fun it is." The Daily News' David Hinckley shared Goldman's concerns about resetting the characters, and while he believed that doing so was the right long-term move, he commented that: "the immediate effect is to make the episode feel a little jerky." Hinckley felt that the episode's greatest problems were its pace and execution, observing: "Too many twists and turns feel a little too sudden, leaving us not quite sure how we got from here to there."

Bobby Hankinson of The Houston Chronicle wrote that he was "only so-so" about the episode, which he deemed "uneven", but was still pleased that the series was back. Vanity Fair's Brett Berk called the episode "a bit haphazard", and commented: "this kind of spiraling frenzy is not only unsustainable, but ultimately dizzying and, dare I say it, a little boring." Randee Dawn of The Hollywood Reporter reported that "Hell-O" had a "stagy quality", and was "not an episode that would have sold the series early on". Dawn felt that there were too many musical performances, commenting: "They might be fun performances, but they're not all necessary, and yes, it is possible to have too much music even on a successful narrative musical TV series."
