= The Power of Madonna =

- Glee episode
- Episode no.: Season 1 Episode 15
- Directed by: Ryan Murphy
- Written by: Ryan Murphy
- Production code: 1ARC14
- Original air date: April 20, 2010

Guest appearances
- Jonathan Groff as Jesse St. James; Iqbal Theba as Principal Figgins; Naya Rivera as Santana Lopez; Josh Sussman as Jacob Ben Israel; Heather Morris as Brittany Pierce; Harry Shum Jr. as Mike Chang; Dijon Talton as Matt Rutherford; Lauren Potter as Becky Jackson

Episode chronology
← Previous "Hell-O"	Next → "Home"
- Glee season 1

"The Power of Madonna" is the fifteenth episode of the American television series Glee. The episode premiered on the Fox network on April 20, 2010. When cheerleading coach Sue Sylvester (Jane Lynch) demands that Madonna's music be played over the school intercom system, glee club director Will Schuester (Matthew Morrison) sets the club a Madonna-themed assignment, hoping to empower the female club members. "The Power of Madonna" was written and directed by series creator Ryan Murphy, and serves as a musical tribute to Madonna, featuring cover versions of eight of her songs, with the singer having granted Glee the rights to her entire catalogue of music. Glee: The Music, The Power of Madonna, an album containing studio recordings of songs performed in the episode, was released on April 20, 2010.

The episode was watched by 12.98 million American viewers, and was generally well received by critics. Tim Stack of Entertainment Weekly and Aly Semigran of MTV both deemed it the best episode of the show thus far, and the Houston Chronicle's Bobby Hankinson called it potentially "the most-enjoyable hour of television of all time." Other reviews were more mixed, with Emily VanDerWerff of The A.V. Club criticizing the increasing number of musical performances for disrupting the tonal balance of the show, and IGN's Eric Goldman questioning the series' writing. Madonna herself approved of the episode, calling it "brilliant on every level".

The episode won "Outstanding Sound Mixing For A Comedy Or Drama Series (One Hour)" at the Creative Arts Emmy Awards, while Jane Lynch won the Primetime Emmy Award for Outstanding Supporting Actress in a Comedy Series for her performance in this episode.

== Plot ==
Cheerleading coach Sue Sylvester (Jane Lynch) has the Cheerios emulate Madonna, so that they will be more empowered in their cheerleading routines. Continuing her blackmail of Principal Figgins (Iqbal Theba), Sue has Madonna tracks played over the school intercom throughout the day. Glee club director Will Schuester (Matthew Morrison) overhears the girls in the club discussing difficulties they are having in relationships and life. Rachel (Lea Michele) asks the other girls for advice on a boy pressuring her to have sex, while Tina (Jenna Ushkowitz) tells them that Artie (Kevin McHale) has asked her to start wearing more revealing clothes if she wants to be with him. When Will observes the Cheerios performing a routine with stilts to "Ray of Light", he is inspired to set a Madonna-themed assignment to restore the girls to equal status. Most of the male club members are unimpressed, even when the girls perform "Express Yourself". Club co-captains Rachel and Finn (Cory Monteith) practice performing a mash-up of "Borderline" and "Open Your Heart".

When Will ridicules Sue's fashion sense, Kurt (Chris Colfer) and Mercedes (Amber Riley) give her a makeover, recreating Madonna's "Vogue" video. Guidance counselor Emma Pillsbury (Jayma Mays) is inspired by Madonna's example, and tells Will that she intends to lose her virginity to him that evening. Santana (Naya Rivera) offers to take Finn's virginity, and Rachel and her boyfriend Jesse St. James (Jonathan Groff) also decide to have sex, leading to a dream performance of "Like a Virgin" between all three couples. Ultimately, Emma and Rachel do not go through with it, but Finn does have sex with Santana. He later hides this from Rachel, having concluded that the sex was meaningless, and that he truly regretted it, in contrast with Rachel, who despite not going through with it, claims she did as she said and it was no big deal.

Jesse transfers to William McKinley High School, leaving the Vocal Adrenaline glee club to join New Directions, so that he and Rachel can be openly together. There is resistance from the group, who believe that this will result in them getting even fewer solos than they had been, and they suspect that Jesse is a spy for his former club. Kurt and Mercedes are recruited by Sue to join the Cheerios and perform "4 Minutes" with them during a school assembly. They tell Will that they are unhappy about never being given solos and will be in both groups. The boys sing "What It Feels Like for a Girl" and decide to treat the girls better. Artie apologizes to Tina for his prior behavior, and they kiss. Finn formally welcomes Jesse into New Directions and tells him and Rachel that he won't interfere in their relationship. The entire glee club sings "Like a Prayer" backed by a gospel choir, and Kurt and Mercedes each have a solo in the song.

== Production ==
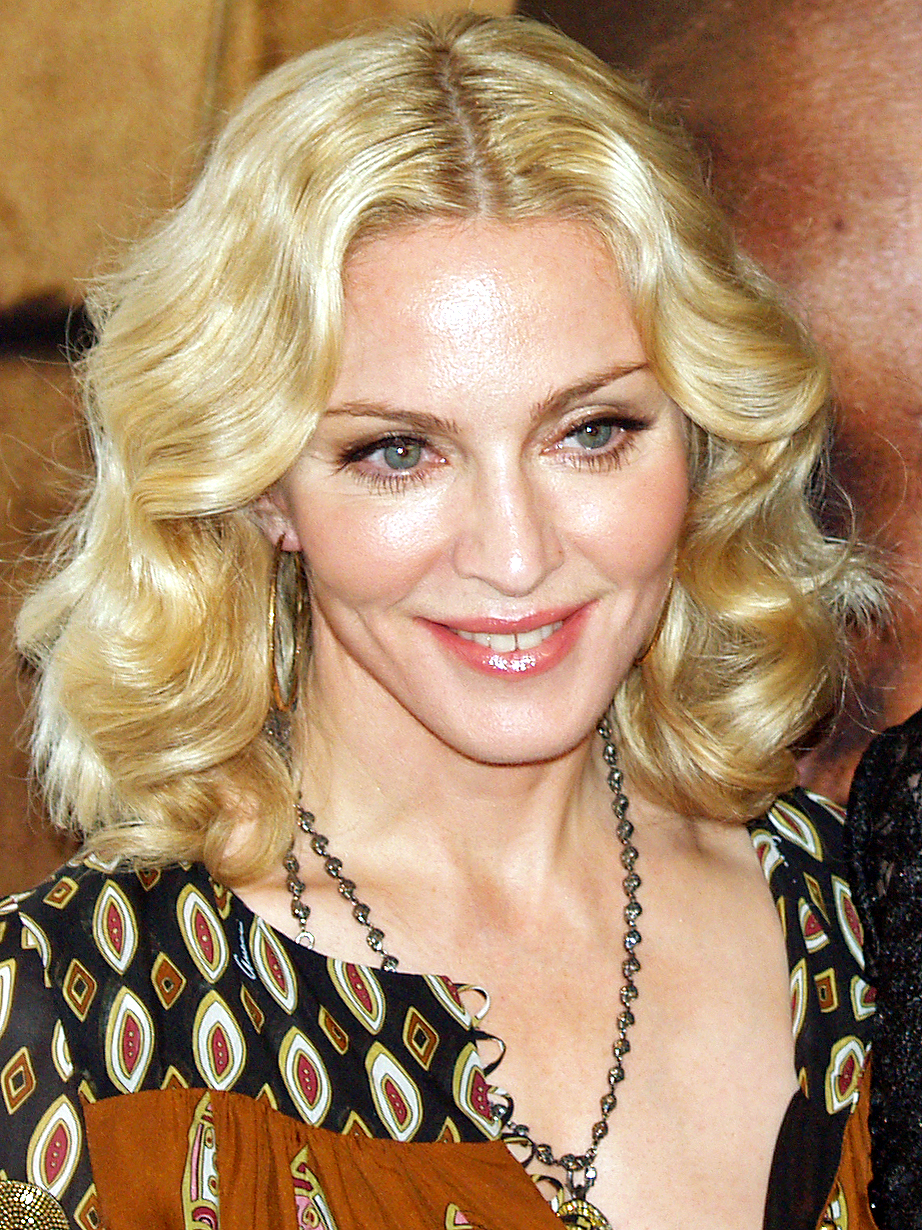
Madonna granted Glee the rights to her entire catalogue of music.

In 2009, Madonna granted Glee the rights to her entire catalogue of music, and the producers planned an episode which would feature Madonna songs exclusively. Series creator Ryan Murphy had worked with Madonna in the past, and wished to produce a Glee tribute to her. Madonna agreed and "cooperated in every way possible." The episode was filmed in January 2010. Lynch performed Madonna's "Vogue", her first vocal performance on the show. Rehearsals for the routine began in December 2009. It was filmed in black and white, with the original video playing in front of the performers as they worked. Lynch also wore a conical bra in the episode, emulating Madonna's image.

Before the episode's track listing was announced, Morrison hoped that his character, glee club director Will Schuester, would sing "Like a Virgin", believing it befit Will's relationship with guidance counsellor Emma Pillsbury. TV Guide's William Keck later confirmed that Emma would be involved in the staging of "Like a Virgin", with Mays' agreement that the song is "very appropriate and fitting" for her character.

Glee: The Music, The Power of Madonna, an EP containing studio recordings of songs performed in the episode, was released on April 20, 2010. Its track list encompasses "Express Yourself", a mash-up of "Borderline" and "Open Your Heart", "Vogue", "Like a Virgin", "4 Minutes", "What it Feels Like for a Girl", and "Like a Prayer". The iTunes edition features a bonus track, "Burning Up", which was not performed in the episode. Although they were not performed by the show's cast, Madonna's "Ray of Light", "Burning Up", "Justify My Love", and "Frozen" were also used as backing tracks in the episode. All songs on the EP apart from the bonus track were also released as singles, available for digital download. In its first week of release, Glee: The Music, The Power of Madonna reached number one on the Billboard 200, with 98,000 copies sold.

== Reception ==
=== Ratings ===
In its original broadcast, "The Power of Madonna" was watched by 12.98 million American viewers and attained a 5.3/13 rating/share in the 18–49 demographic. In the United Kingdom, the episode was watched by 1.98 million viewers, and was the most-watched show of the week on the non-terrestrial channels. It attained the highest audience share in the 16–34 demographic in its timeslot. In Canada, the episode was watched by 2.096 million viewers and was the sixth most-viewed program of the week. In Australia, Glee attained a new ratings high, winning its timeslot in all key demographics. It was watched by 1.42 million viewers, making Glee the eleventh most-viewed show of the week.

=== Critical response ===
"This is Glee at its very, very best. The story was light and moved briskly with minimal ham-fisted melodrama. The performances were not only great on their own, but most of them greatly improved on the source material. And, most importantly, the whole thing was just overwhelmingly fun."

— Bobby Hankinson on "The Power of Madonna"

Lynch received the Primetime Emmy Award for Outstanding Supporting Actress in a Comedy Series for her performance in the episode. At the 2010 Creative Arts Emmy Awards, Phillip W. Palmer, Doug Andham and Joseph H. Earle won the "Outstanding Sound Mixing For A Comedy Or Drama Series (One Hour)" award. Lou A. Eyrich and Marisa Aboitiz were additionally nominated for the "Outstanding Costumes for a Series" award. Competing against the Glee episode "Hairography", Stacey K. Black, Mary G. Stultz, Roxanne N. Sutphen and Gina Bonacquisti were nominated for "Outstanding Hairstyling for a Single-Camera Series", and competing against the episode "Theatricality", Eryn Krueger Mekash, Kelley Mitchell, Jennifer Greenberg, Robin Neal-Luce, Kelcey Fry and Zoe Haywas were nominated for "Outstanding Makeup For A Single-Camera Series (Non-Prosthetic)".

Madonna approved of the episode, telling Us Weekly that she found it "brilliant on every level", praising the scripting and the message of equality. The episode also received positive reviews from critics. Ken Tucker of Entertainment Weekly called it "one of the best hours of TV you’re likely to see all year", writing that the episode pays Madonna "the highest compliment possible" in not just expressing admiration for the singer, but "demonstrat[ing] a potent understanding of why Madonna matters." Fellow Entertainment Weekly writer Tim Stack deemed it the best episode of Glee thus far, grading each of the songs performed "B+" through to "A+". Stack felt that the episode lived up to its hype, an opinion concurred with by Aly Semigran of MTV, who also deemed "The Power of Madonna" the show's best episode to date. Bobby Hankinson of the Houston Chronicle went further in his praise, calling "The Power of Madonna" potentially "the most-enjoyable hour of television of all time." Kevin Coll of Fused Film felt that the episode redeemed the series following its "dismal comeback" with "Hell-O", calling it "a great story that explored the characters of Glee in much better depth than they ever have."

Emily VanDerWerff of The A.V. Club graded the episode "B", however was less positive than other critics. While she stated that the musical numbers were "among the best things the show has ever done", she felt that "just about everything else around them gets short shrift", criticizing the increase in performances in the first half of the season for upsetting the balance of the series. Eric Goldman of IGN rated the episode 8/10, observing that while he was in the minority of reviewers for not "absolutely loving it", he found "The Power of Madonna" to be "a bit messy in the writing department, even while it delivered several really great scenes and moments along the way."
