= I Am Unicorn =

- Glee episode
- Episode no.: Season 3 Episode 2
- Directed by: Brad Falchuk
- Written by: Ryan Murphy
- Production code: 3ARC02
- Original air date: September 27, 2011

Guest appearances
- Idina Menzel as Shelby Corcoran; Mike O'Malley as Burt Hummel; Iqbal Theba as Principal Figgins; Dot-Marie Jones as Coach Beiste; Lauren Potter as Becky Jackson; Vanessa Lengies as Sugar Motta; Rick Pasqualone as Al Motta; Mary Gillis as Mrs. Hagberg

Episode chronology
← Previous "The Purple Piano Project"	Next → "Asian F"
- Glee season 3

"I Am Unicorn" is the second episode of the third season of the American musical television series Glee, and the forty-sixth overall. The episode was written by series co-creator Ryan Murphy, directed by series co-creator Brad Falchuk, and first aired on September 27, 2011 on Fox in the United States. It features the return of Shelby Corcoran (Idina Menzel) to the show to direct a rival glee club at William McKinley High even while New Directions, the current club, is having trouble recruiting members. Shelby also wants Quinn (Dianna Agron) and Puck (Mark Salling), the biological parents of her adopted daughter Beth, to be a part of Beth's life. The director of New Directions, Will Schuester (Matthew Morrison) sets up a "booty camp" for the less capable dancers in the club, and auditions for the school musical, West Side Story, begin.

The episode received mostly positive reviews, with approval being given to the resurrection of neglected storylines from the show's first season. One of these was the adoption of Beth, and critics were especially happy with the scene where Puck meets her, but there was widespread disdain for the explanation behind Shelby's return, that of starting a rival glee club. There were only three musical numbers in the episode, though all three were given positive notices, with the overall favorite being Blaine's performance of "Something's Coming" from West Side Story at the end of the episode. All three songs were released as singles, available for download, and "Somewhere", sung as a duet by Menzel and Lea Michele, charted on the Billboard Hot 100. It did not chart on the Canadian Hot 100. Upon its initial airing, this episode was viewed by 8.60 million American viewers and garnered a 3.7/10 Nielsen rating/share in the 18–49 demographic. The total viewership and ratings for this episode were down from the previous week's season opener, "The Purple Piano Project".

== Plot ==
Glee club director Will Schuester (Matthew Morrison) institutes a "booty camp" to hone the dancing skills of New Directions members Finn (Cory Monteith), Mercedes (Amber Riley), Puck (Mark Salling), Kurt (Chris Colfer) and Blaine (Darren Criss), and has Mike (Harry Shum Jr.) instruct them. As he is too busy to direct the upcoming school musical West Side Story, guidance counselor Emma Pillsbury (Jayma Mays), football coach Shannon Beiste (Dot-Marie Jones) and New Directions member Artie Abrams (Kevin McHale) take charge of it.

Rachel (Lea Michele) and Kurt audition, respectively, for the lead roles of Maria and Tony; she performs "Somewhere" from the show, and he performs "I'm the Greatest Star" from Funny Girl. Kurt later eavesdrops on the directors and hears them question whether he is masculine enough for the role. He re-auditions and attempts to give a more masculine performance, but they are unable to suppress laughter at his acting. Kurt is also running for class president, and accepts campaign help from Brittany (Heather Morris), who wants to highlight his unique character by comparing him to a unicorn. Kurt feels her proposed campaign materials highlight only his gay side, and is upset when she goes against his wishes and posts them anyway. He discusses his image problem with his father, Burt (Mike O'Malley), who recommends that he embrace his uniqueness. Kurt later changes his mind about his campaign's approach and apologizes to Brittany, but is surprised to learn that she too has decided to run for class president.

Shelby Corcoran (Idina Menzel)—Rachel's biological mother, the adoptive mother of Quinn (Dianna Agron) and Puck's daughter Beth, and the former coach of rival glee club Vocal Adrenaline—is headhunted to coach a second glee club at McKinley High financed by Sugar Motta's (Vanessa Lengies) wealthy and doting father. Shelby reaches out to Rachel, Puck and Quinn. She lets Puck see Beth, but rejects Quinn's desire to do likewise due to Quinn's bad-girl attitude, appearance and behavior. Cheerleading coach Sue Sylvester (Jane Lynch), who is running for Congress, convinces Quinn to feature in an anti-arts video for her campaign. In it, Quinn confronts Will and blames him for her transformation into a bad girl, but Will reprimands her, reminds her of how the glee club and its members have always supported her in the past and tells her to grow up. After seeing a picture of a happy Beth and Puck, Quinn breaks down. She resumes her normal appearance, and Will and the New Directions welcome her back into the club. Puck tells Quinn he is proud of her, but Quinn reveals she is only pretending to behave in order to take Beth back from Shelby, and intends to pursue full custody.

To avoid competing with Kurt, Blaine auditions for a supporting role with a rendition of "Something's Coming", one of Tony's songs from the show. The directors are impressed, and ask if he will read for the part of Tony instead. Kurt, who was watching from above, silently walks out of the auditorium.

== Production ==
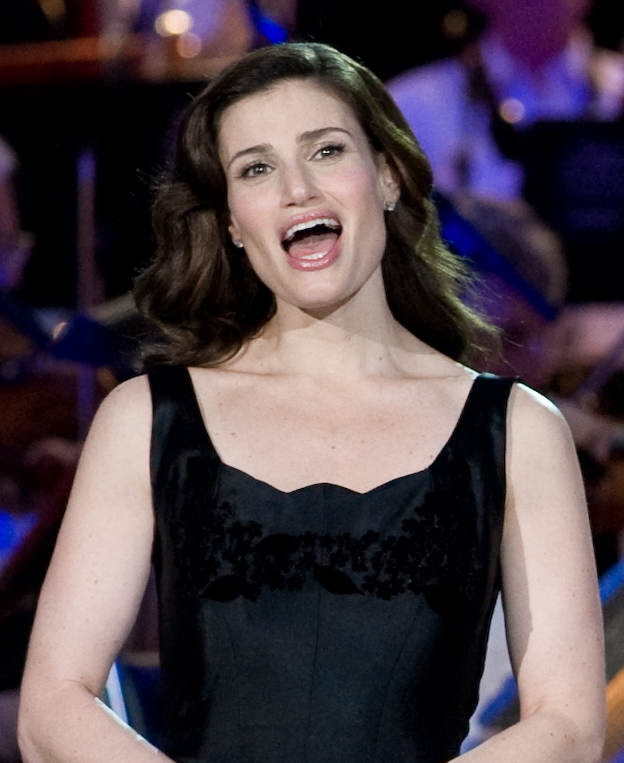
This episode marked the return of Broadway star Idina Menzel (pictured) as Shelby Corcoran.

The episode was written by series co-creator Ryan Murphy, directed by series co-creator Brad Falchuk, and was filmed in five days, from August 22, 2011 through August 26, 2011. Broadway star Idina Menzel returns for the first time since the first season finale "Journey to Regionals", when her character, Shelby Corcoran, adopted Quinn's newborn baby, named Beth. On July 15, 2011, it was announced that Menzel would be returning to Glee in the third season "for a major arc that could span as many as 10-12 episodes". Series co-creator Ryan Murphy was quoted as saying, "I'm really excited [...] that Idina is joining the family again. We missed her last year and we're happy that she is coming back." The article also noted that her character, Shelby, would be "returning from New York to Ohio to join William McKinley High School as a new teacher". Menzel herself said that she would "be back and forth in Glee all throughout the season", which she was "very excited about". Shelby's adopted daughter is also appearing: Menzel tweeted that she was "shooting scenes with babies". The drawing of the "Clown Pig" that Puck brings for Beth was actually drawn by Falchuk and Agron.

Recurring guest stars appearing in the episode include Principal Figgins (Iqbal Theba), Coach Beiste (Jones), cheerleader Becky Jackson (Lauren Potter), student Sugar Motta (Lengies) and Menzel as Shelby. Second season series regular Mike O'Malley, who plays Burt Hummel and also appears in the episode, is listed in the Fox press release as a guest star for this episode and receives a like credit in the episode itself.

Three singles were released from the episode: "I'm the Greatest Star" from Funny Girl sung by Colfer, and covers of "Something's Coming" and "Somewhere" from West Side Story—the former sung by Criss, and the latter a duet between Michele and Menzel.

== Reception ==
=== Ratings ===
"I Am Unicorn" was first broadcast on September 27, 2011 in the United States on Fox. It garnered a 3.7/10 Nielsen rating/share in the 18–49 demographic, and received 8.60 million American viewers during its initial airing. It was beaten for the second week in a row in its timeslot by NCIS on CBS, which earned a 4.2/12 rating/share in the 18–49 demographic, and also by the second episode of New Girl, which follows Glee on Fox, and brought in a 4.5/11 rating/share and 9.28 million viewers. The Glee numbers were down from the previous week's season opener, "The Purple Piano Project", which netted a 4.0/11 rating/share and 9.21 million viewers.

In the United Kingdom, "I Am Unicorn" was watched on Sky1 by 995,000 viewers, down 177,000 from the season premiere the previous week. In Australia, the episode drew 729,000 viewers, which made Glee the fifteenth most-watched program of the night, down from the season premiere's twelfth most-watched program of the night and 760,000 viewers in the previous week. In Canada, 1.50 million viewers watched the episode, and it was the eighteenth most-viewed show of the week, down eight slots and 28% from the 2.10 million who watched "The Purple Piano Project".

=== Critical reception ===
Reviewers generally received this episode positively, though some, like IGN's Robert Canning, thought it was merely "okay"; he gave it a score of 6.5 out of 10, and Amy Reiter of the Los Angeles Times said she "felt vaguely underwhelmed" and that the episode "lacked emotional resonance". In contrast, The A.V. Club's Emily VanDerWerff gave the episode a "B", and called it "a marked improvement over the season premiere", and complimented the way it "gave nearly all of the storylines an emotional core". Anthony Benigno of The Faster Times characterized it as "one of the tightest, best-made, most well-acted, and entertaining hours" from Glee in a very long time, and BuddyTV's John Kubicek said that it was "quintessential Glee" and that "the show is once again a magical, fabulous unicorn." Bobby Hankinson of the Houston Chronicle was "charmed", "moved", and "excited for what's to come."

The reappearance of storylines left dangling at the end of the first season was noted with approval by Samantha Urban of The Dallas Morning News and VanDerWerff, who both mentioned not only the big one about Quinn and Puck and baby Beth but also Artie's love of directing, and variously added Rachel and Shelby, and movement on the Will and Emma relationship. The fact that Shelby had been hired to form a second glee club at McKinley, however, was greeted with derision by both reviewers—Urban called it "mind-bogglingly idiotic"—and others as well. Reiter found the idea incomprehensible, and Vanity Fair's Brett Berk wrote, "Given Will's ongoing struggles to fill his own crooning baker's dozen, this is about as realistic a plan as Michele Bachmann starting a rival chapter of PFLAG at Liberty University." Vicki Hyman of The Star-Ledger characterized the notion of "Shelby deciding to give up a burgeoning Broadway career because she was missing her daughter grow up" to take a part-time job in Lima as "ridiculous", and the whole scenario as "more than a little bizarre".

The effect of Shelby's advent on Puck evoked the most praise. Benigno called the segment where Puck meets Beth "the best scene of this very young season", The Hollywood Reporter's Lesley Goldberg said it was a "top moment", and Abby West of Entertainment Weekly dubbed it "the sweetest scene of the night". VanDerWerff also called it "very sweet" and expressed hope that "the show will come up with something for him to do after mostly relegating him to weird comic relief last season." The effect of her return on Quinn was greeted with less enthusiasm. Reiter was "not thrilled" by the possibility of a custody battle between Quinn and Shelby and called Quinn's plan "half-baked", and Canning dismissed it as "clichéd drama". Kubicek expressed interest in seeing "where this goes", and VanDerWerff noted that Quinn has been "grieving giving up her child all this time and she didn't even know it", and characterized it as a "fairly powerful storyline".

Critics were divided on Kurt's storyline as he faced being perceived primarily as gay both when auditioning and when running for class president. VanDerWerff said it was "the most consistent" storyline, and Canning called it "the most familiar story", but also described Kurt as "by far the most interesting and most layered" character, his stories "delivering the most emotional connections", and this episode's installments "entertaining territory". Kubicek stated that there were "tons" of wonderful "Kurt moments" in the episode. Benigno called Kurt learning to embrace his gayness yet again on the show "kind of awkward", and Hyman asked "Was this Kurt Accepts He's Special 3.0 or 4.0? I can't keep track." Votta summed up Kurt's audition quandary: "Kurt is fighting typecasting, and while the ninjitsu, fingerless gloves and climbing routine might have been an attempt to butch it up, instead Kurt played right into expectations with the over-the-top Funny Girl piece." His attempt to rescue the situation by reauditioning via performing a Romeo and Juliet scene with Rachel evoked laughter from the three directors and Rachel herself, but as Votta points out, Kurt was "not actually being bad as Romeo". Jayma Mays, who plays Emma, one of the directors in that scene, stated in an interview that she thought Kurt was "good". Kurt finding himself in competition with Blaine was also touched on, but several reviewers were unhappy with the revelation that Blaine was not a senior like Kurt, as had been implied in the previous season. VanDerWerff wrote that Blaine "seems to have simultaneously gotten younger and had a complete personality transplant over the summer", Votta noted "the continuity-bending plot point that he's somehow a Junior and not a Senior like his boyfriend", and Urban allowed her exasperation to show: "Oh really, Glee? Blaine's a junior? Blaine's younger than Kurt? Fine. FINE." MTV's Jim Cantiello went into rhyme to express his dismay: "It's hard to keep my bearings straight / And oh, how it makes my heart ache / Kurt and Blaine were gonna move to New York together / But now they'll have to wait", referring to a scene in the "New York" episode where Kurt discussed the planned move with Rachel.

Goldberg was pleased that having Brittany volunteer to run Kurt's campaign included an acknowledgment that he "went through hell" the previous year, and praised "Brittany logic" in general. Respers France loved that Brittany, in helping Kurt find his magical inner unicorn, was able to find her own. Reiter enjoyed the "delicious dose of Brittany-isms", which she called "the best part" of the episode, and Kubicek said that there were "tons of wonderful" Brittany moments. For Hyman, the "one sit-up-and-take-notice moment" was the confrontation between Will and Quinn where he told her to grow up. Respers France thought "Sue Sylvester's attempt to use Quinn against the glee club was hilarious", but VanDerWerff was unhappy with Quinn being coopted into "Sue’s ridiculous run for Congress". Reiter wrote that it was "hard to muster much sympathy for Quinn" in the episode given the scene with Quinn and The Skanks: "Flushing someone's head in a public toilet, threatening to cut them, and shaking them down for their lunch money are orders of magnitude more chilling than the face-full-of-slushy bullying we're used to seeing."

=== Music and performances ===
The episode's musical performances were well received by most reviewers. All three were Broadway songs, two from West Side Story and one from Funny Girl—the concentration on show tunes disappointed Reiter, and Canning felt they were all "too bland", but others were happy with the selections including Hankinson who said he was "loving the Broadway-bend to these first two episodes", and added, "all three of tonight's numbers were hands-down fantastic."

The duet of "Somewhere" featuring Rachel and Shelby was generally complimented. Both Benigno and Rae Votta of Billboard compared it favorably to their previous duet, Lady Gaga's "Poker Face", from season one. Benigno gave the performance a "B+", while Michael Slezak of TVLine gave it an "A−" and praised their "powerful, evocative voices". Rolling Stone's Erica Futterman was not impressed, and characterized it as "Lite FM snooze that does nothing to showcase these Broadway belters in a new and exciting way". Amy Lee of The Huffington Post called it "pretty bland", and said it was "getting annoying" that Rachel "sings every song as if she's Barbra Streisand". The Wall Street Journal's Raymund Flandez, however, called the duet "pitch-perfect" and "so sublime it makes you catch your breath".

Kurt's choice of "I'm the Greatest Star" to audition for the role of Tony—the one song not from West Side Story—drew comment: Benigno ascribed it to Kurt's "ability to make a talented ass of himself", while Slezak was of the opinion that Kurt was "way too savvy, and way too hungry for the role" for that kind of misstep. Despite these plot-related issues, both reviewers gave the performance an "A", and Benigno noted both that "he nails it" and "last half of the song is a singing clinic." VanDerWerff was not fond of the reliance on "gimmicky staging", though Futterman called it "an impressive physical performance", Votta stated that "Kurt sounds flawless and the performance is captivating" and Flandez complimented his "captivating high notes after high notes", and added, "He's a star unicorn, and he knows it." Lisa Respers France of CNN wrote that Kurt "was amazing singing Streisand, and for the first time I realized that he really is as big a star as Rachel."

Blaine's rendition of "Something's Coming" was the most enthusiastically welcomed. It was the favorite number of Lee, VanDerWerff and Futterman; Lee said it was "the best song", and added, "he's kinetic, impassioned and generally delightful as Blaine-playing-Tony." VanDerWerff was even more complimentary with "by far the best performance", and Futterman called it "the winning musical number of the episode". Both Slezak and Benigno gave it a "B+", and the former complimented Criss's "breathless charm and boyish enthusiasm", while the latter maintained that the actor is "at his best when he's doing goofy pop numbers with kind of an off-beat twist". West gave the song an "A−", and said "Blaine just knows how to own the stage and your TV screen", while both Votta and Respers France wrote that he was the "perfect Tony".

=== Chart history ===
One of the three cover versions released as singles debuted on the Billboard Hot 100, and none charted on the Canadian Hot 100 or in England or Australia. The duet version of "Somewhere" appeared at number seventy-five, the fourth time the song charted in the Hot 100. By contrast, "Something's Coming", the episode's other song from West Side Story, has never appeared in the Hot 100, and failed to chart there again.
