= Shelby Corcoran =

Fictional character from the Fox series Glee

- Glee character
- Idina Menzel as Shelby Corcoran in Glee
- First appearance: "Hell-O" (2010)
- Last appearance: "Sweet Dreams" (2013)
- Created by: Ian Brennan
- Portrayed by: Idina Menzel

In-universe information
- Occupation: Show choir director (formerly) daycare operator (currently)
- Children: Rachel Berry (biological); Beth Corcoran (adoptive)

Shelby Corcoran is a recurring fictional character from the Fox musical comedy-drama series Glee. Portrayed by actress Idina Menzel, Shelby was introduced in the fourteenth episode of the show as the coach of Vocal Adrenaline, a rival show choir to New Directions, the show's primary musical group. Fans had lobbied for Menzel to be cast as Rachel Berry's (Lea Michele) biological mother, due to the strong physical resemblance between Menzel and Michele. After it is revealed that Shelby is, in fact, Rachel's biological mother, Shelby discloses that she had signed a contract that stated that she could not seek out her daughter until she was eighteen. She tells Rachel that instead of trying to act like mother and daughter, they should just be grateful that they have met, and maintain a distance.

In the season one finale, Shelby adopts Quinn and Puck's newborn daughter, Beth. She leaves Vocal Adrenaline before the beginning of the next school year. Shelby returns in the second episode of the third season, having been recruited to lead a second glee club at McKinley High by Sugar Motta's father when Sugar is refused entry into New Directions. Shelby offers to include both Quinn and Puck in Beth's life. Struggling at being a mother, she forms a romantic bond with eighteen-year-old student Puck, leading to a sexual relationship before she tells him that their relationship is a mistake and resigns from McKinley in the eighth episode. While Menzel's musical performances on the show have been lauded, Shelby's storylines were characterized as rushed, incomprehensible and polarizing by contemporary reviewers.

== Storylines ==
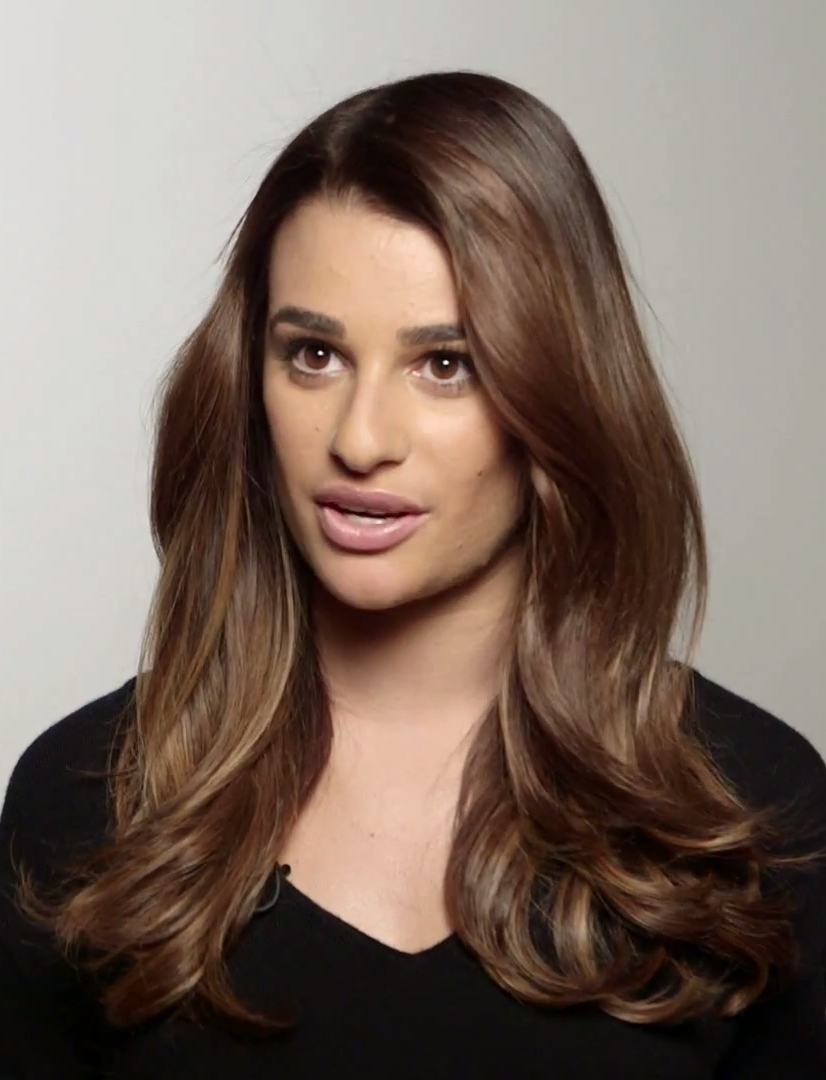
Menzel was cast in Glee following a fan campaign based on her resemblance to Lea Michele (pictured), who plays Rachel Berry. Her character, Shelby, is revealed to be Rachel's mother in the "Dream On" episode.

Shelby Corcoran is introduced in the fourteenth episode of the series as the coach of Vocal Adrenaline, a rival show choir to New Directions, the show's primary musical group. New Directions' director, Will (Matthew Morrison), on a visit to Carmel High School, meets Shelby. Shelby flirts with Will and then seduces him, and they end up at his apartment making out, but Will is unable to continue and tells her about his relationship problems. Shelby suggests that as Will had been with Terri (Jessalyn Gilsig) since he was fifteen and has immediately moved on to a new relationship, he ought to take some time out for himself. She later observes as New Directions' star singer, Rachel Berry (Lea Michele), and Vocal Adrenaline's Jesse St. James (Jonathan Groff) kiss, and exchanges knowing looks with Jesse. In "Dream On", Rachel confides in Jesse of her lifelong dream to discover the identity of her mother. While they are searching through boxes of records from her basement, Jesse takes a cassette tape from his jacket and pretends that it came from the box. The tape is labeled as a message from mother to daughter. Rachel refuses to listen to the tape, stating that she is not ready. Jesse later meets with Shelby, who reveals that she is Rachel's biological mother and surrogate, but a contractual agreement with Rachel's two fathers prevents her from meeting with Rachel until she is 18. She implores Jesse to convince Rachel to listen to the tape. Back at Rachel's house, Jesse starts the tape playing as Rachel enters her bedroom, then leaves her to listen to it. On the tape, Shelby sings "I Dreamed a Dream", leading to a duet with Rachel in a dream sequence, ending with Rachel back in her room in tears.

While subsequently spying on a Vocal Adrenaline rehearsal, Rachel realizes that Shelby is her biological mother. After Shelby and Rachel meet, Will meets with Shelby, concerned that she is not as invested in forging a relationship as Rachel is. Shelby confesses that she can no longer have children, but wishes she could have her baby back, rather than the now fully grown Rachel, whom she feels does not need her. She tells Rachel that instead of trying to act like mother and daughter, they should just be grateful that they have met, and maintain their distance. Rachel hugs her goodbye, and they duet on an acoustic version of "Poker Face". In "Journey to Regionals", the show's first-season finale, Rachel asks Shelby to help coach New Directions, but Shelby tells Rachel that she's tired of coaching glee clubs, and is stepping down as Vocal Adrenaline's coach to settle down and start a family. Shelby adopts Quinn's (Dianna Agron) baby, whom she names Beth at Puck's (Mark Salling) request.

Shelby returns in the second episode of the third season, "I Am Unicorn", having been headhunted to coach a second glee club at McKinley High financed by Sugar Motta's (Vanessa Lengies) wealthy and doting father. Shelby reaches out to Rachel, Puck and Quinn. She lets Puck see Beth, but rejects Quinn's desire to do likewise due to Quinn's bad-girl attitude, appearance and behavior. Quinn quickly resumes her normal appearance, but reveals to Puck she is only pretending to behave in order to take Beth back from Shelby, and intends to pursue full custody. After Puck tells Shelby of Quinn's true intentions, Shelby informs Quinn that she does not want her in Beth's life. Shelby tells Puck that she is struggling at being a mother; as the episode ends, they kiss. Puck falls in love with her, but Shelby tells him in "Mash Off" that the kiss was a mistake. She compounds the mistake in "I Kissed a Girl" when she sleeps with him, and resigns from McKinley in the eighth episode, "Hold On to Sixteen". In the season four "Sweet Dreams" episode, which establishes that she is living in New York with Beth and is running a day care business, she tells Rachel to be original in her choice of music at her audition for the role of Fanny Brice in the upcoming Broadway revival of Funny Girl.

== Development ==
During its initial run of episodes, Glee fans lobbied for the Broadway actress (Idina Menzel) to be cast as the biological mother of Rachel Berry, due to the strong resemblance between her and Michele. Series creator Ryan Murphy commented to the media that he had met with Menzel, by December 2009, the break in the first season, but had not yet decided upon a role for her. The actress was ultimately cast as the coach of rival glee club Vocal Adrenaline, with Murphy comparing her character to Faye Dunaway's character, Diana Christensen, in Network. Menzel makes her first appearance in "Hell-O". On July 15, 2011, it was announced that Menzel would be returning to Glee in the third season "for a major arc that could span as many as 10-12 episodes". Murphy was quoted as saying, "I'm really excited [...] that Idina is joining the family again. We missed her last year and we're happy that she is coming back." The article also noted that her character, Shelby, would be "returning from New York to Ohio to join William McKinley High School as a new teacher". Menzel herself said that she would "be back and forth in Glee all throughout the season", which she was "very excited about".

== Critical reception ==
Upon the character's introduction, Lisa Respers France of CNN wrote that she was "praying" that Shelby would turn out to be Rachel's biological mother, noting the stark resemblance between the two actresses. The A.V. Club author Emily VanDerWerff deemed the make-out sequence between Shelby and Will nonsensical, but wrote that Menzel brought "such an air of authority to what she's doing that the scene still plays." The revelation that Shelby is Rachel's biological mother, in the "Dream On" episode, was greeted as poignant and realistic by VanDerWeff, and as "great" and humanizing by Entertainment Weekly's Tim Stack. Respers France was so impressed with the storyline that she was initially concerned it may be a dream sequence, and Eric Goldman of IGN found it the episode's strongest attribute. Both James Poniewozik of Time and VanDerWerff praised the Rachel/Shelby storyline in "Theatricality". The former commended Michele and Menzel for conveying "straight emotion" and the latter asserted that the storyline was "very well-handled, another emotional story that the series is mostly nailing the execution of". In contrast, BuddyTV editor Henrik Batallones criticized the storyline, suggesting that it was rushed and would have been better stretched out across the remainder of the season. VanDerWerff wrote that she did not "completely buy" Shelby's "sudden" decision to adopt Beth in "Journey to Regionals".

Samantha Urban of The Dallas Morning News dismissed the fact that Shelby had been hired to form a second glee club at McKinley as "mind-bogglingly idiotic". Amy Reiter of the Los Angeles Times found the idea incomprehensible, and Vanity Fair's Brett Berk wrote, "Given Will's ongoing struggles to fill his own crooning baker's dozen, this is about as realistic a plan as Michele Bachmann starting a rival chapter of PFLAG at Liberty University." Vicki Hyman of The Star-Ledger characterized the notion of "Shelby deciding to give up a burgeoning Broadway career because she was missing her daughter grow up" to take a part-time job in Lima as "ridiculous", and the whole scenario as "more than a little bizarre". Puck and Shelby's kiss in the "Pot o' Gold" episode was characterized as "creepy" and "super awkward" by AOLTV's Crystal Bell, as either "super creepy" or "romantic" by BuddyTV's John Kubicek, and as "groan-inducing" in the "You're actually going to go there?" vein by IGN journalist Robert Canning. Critics were polarized by Puck and Shelby's sexual encounter in the "I Kissed a Girl" episode. Kubicek declared that "the dumbest storyline Glee has ever done gets even dumber," MTV contributor Kevin Sullivan called it "the most divisive plot line of the season", and Bell asked, "Instead of these super creepy scenes between Puck and Shelby, can we please get more screen time for Shelby and Rachel?"

== Musical performances ==
Michele and Menzel's "I Dreamed a Dream" duet attracted critical praise. Aly Semigran of MTV proclaimed that the performance represented "what musical theater lovers' dreams are made of." At the time, Raymund Flandez of The Wall Street Journal described the number as one of the most poignant duets the series had done, and concluded that "the vulnerability they conveyed is stunning in its simplicity and perfection." Respers France said that the two outdid themselves, Bobby Hankinson of the Houston Chronicle praised Menzel's "awesome voice", and Gerrick D. Kennedy of the Los Angeles Times wrote, "Menzel and Michele together? Singing? Die with me. Again, soundtrack please". VanDerWerff spoke of "absolute perfection", while Blair Baldwin of Zap2it acclaimed it as "an ideal pairing of wicked-great vocalists," and as the show's best musical sequence since its inception.

The acoustic performance of Lady Gaga's "Poker Face", in the "Theatricality" episode, sung by Rachel and Shelby was met with mixed reviews. Menzel opined that the sexual meaning of the song is different in the context of the show, calling it "actually very simple and truthful." Both Mary Hanrahan of Broadway World and Kevin Coll of Fused Film noted that it was well done, but badly matched with the mother–daughter scene and storyline. Despite considering the track's lyricism "a tad weird" in a mother–daughter context, Stack gave the performance an "A+", named it one of his "all-time favorite Glee moments", and called their vocal performance "incredible", as did Hankinson, who additionally applauded the duet's "beautiful" arrangement and favored it as the installment's best musical number. VanDerWeff said the "incredibly bizarre" selection "worked because Menzel and Michele sold it".

The duet of "Somewhere", in the "I Am Unicorn" episode, featuring Rachel and Shelby was generally complimented. Both Anthony Benigno, writing for The Faster Times, and Rae Votta of Billboard compared it favorably to their previous duet, "Poker Face", from season one. Benigno gave the performance a "B+", while Michael Slezak of TVLine gave it an "A−" and praised their "powerful, evocative voices". Rolling Stone's Erica Futterman was not impressed and characterized it as "Lite FM snooze that does nothing to showcase these Broadway belters in a new and exciting way", and Amy Lee of The Huffington Post named it "pretty bland". Flandez, however, hailed the duet as "pitch-perfect" and "so sublime it makes you catch your breath".

The mash-up of "You and I" by Lady Gaga and another "You and I" by Eddie Rabbitt and Crystal Gayle, in the "Mash Off" episode, performed by Menzel and Morrison was well received by critics. Berk said that the mash-up "almost worked", while Los Angeles Times writer L'Oreal Thompson praised the vocals of Menzel: "It's official. Shelby sings Gaga as good as, if not better than, Gaga sings Gaga." Slezak awarded the performance a "B" grade, and opined: "I loved the audacity of mashing up Lady Gaga with an Eddie Rabbit–Crystal Gayle chestnut, and the results had the sheen of '70s a.m. radio fare. Shelby's voice was almost too crystal clear for the Gaga half of the composition." Futterman said that Menzel "can kill a Gaga ballad", and while she "outshines" Morrison, he "complements her nicely". Entertainment Weekly journalist Abby West gave the mash-up a "B+", called it "really well-done" and said it was "elevated" by Menzel's voice. Sullivan wanted Menzel to interpret more songs by Lady Gaga. Votta, however, described the sequence as "horrendous".
