= LaMarcus Tinker =

American actor, producer and director (born 1990)

- Born: LaMarcus Rayshawn Tinker; October 24, 1990 (age 35); Houston, Texas, U.S.
- Occupations: Actor, producer, writer, director

LaMarcus Tinker (born October 24, 1990) is an American actor, producer and director. He is best known for his roles as teenage football star Dallas Tinker on the NBC and Direct TV television drama Friday Night Lights, and as Kevin on the ABC comedy Cougar Town. He appeared as the recurring character Shane on the third season of the Fox television show Glee.

== Early life and education ==
Born in Houston, Tinker became interested in theatre during middle school. He later attended the High School for Law Enforcement and Criminal Justice, where he also continued his activities in theater. He graduated as class salutatorian from NBCA Academy. Tinker received a full academic scholarship to the University of Texas at Arlington, where he studied English.

== Acting career ==
=== Television ===
Tinker joined the cast of Friday Night Lights in September 2009 playing Dallas Tinker, a small town football player. He had initially gone to the shoot to support two of his friends who had landed work as extras on the show, taking the bus with them from Houston to Austin. He met the show's executive producer, Peter Berg, who was directing the episode being filmed, and unexpectedly found himself acting in a scene with two of the show's regulars. The series was filmed using three cameras, without rehearsal and without extensive blocking, and Tinker later recalled, "It was cameras up, let's go. I did it, and he liked it." Two days later, the plans for the show's fourth season were being adjusted to include a new character, Dallas. He was a recurring character for that season, and for the final, fifth one.

In August 2010, Tinker signed on for the second season of the ABC comedy Cougar Town as a recurring character named Kevin. He portrays the college roommate of Travis Cobb (Dan Byrd), the son of series protagonist Jules Cobb (Courteney Cox). Travis is on a mission to reinvent himself now that he's in college, but his roommate Kevin is not as welcoming as he had hoped, though the two warm up to each other eventually.

Tinker was cast for the third season of the hit Fox musical dramedy Glee as Shane, the long-promised boyfriend for Mercedes Jones (Amber Riley). Shane is a lineman on the McKinley High football team; he and Mercedes will have started dating over the summer. His initial appearance is in the first episode of the season.

=== Films ===
He made his feature film debut in the role of Big Corporation for the high school romance The First Time. The movie, by writer-director Jon Kasdan, was shot in Los Angeles in the spring of 2011. The First Time was in the 2012 Sundance Film Festival, and was among the top 5 best films at that festival. The First Time had a very limited release into theaters in Oct 2012, and grossed just $822,833. It was released on DVD and digital download on March 12, 2013.

== Producing ==
Tinker is a film producer, and the owner of LRT Interests INC & Scoot Productions LLC. He is an Executive Producer/Director on several feature films. One is Consequences, a co-production with Wisdom Productions. He is also set to release Down By the River on March 11, 2014. The film was shot in Houston, Texas, and is a co-production with both GreaterWorks Filming Company and Sagemont Studios. Currently, Tinker is set to release several other feature films over the next few years, from his companies and several web-series as well. Tinker worked in 2012 as the director of photography on the feature film Saving Grace, which is being produced by Dennis Rowe Productions. Tinker is also currently working as the director/executive producer on an upcoming TV Series/Web-Series, called Under Nitrous (2013–2015), which is being produced by 3 Night Stand Productions. Tinker is also executive producing Twice As Nice (2012–2013).

== Filmography ==
=== Film ===
| Year | Title | Role | Notes |
|---|---|---|---|
| 2012 | The First Time | Big Corporation | |

=== Television ===
| Year | Title | Role | Notes |
|---|---|---|---|
| 2009–2011 | Friday Night Lights | Dallas Tinker | 24 episodes |
| 2010–2011 | Cougar Town | Kevin | 11 episodes |
| 2011–2012 | Glee | Shane Tinsley | 7 episodes |
| 2012 | Sketchy | Chris | Episode: "Beets By Dre" |
| 2013 | Arrested Development | Earl Monroe | Episode: "Flight of the Phoenix" |
