= Josh Sussman =

American actor

- Sussman in 2026
- Born: Teaneck, New Jersey, U.S.
- Occupation: Actor
- Years active: 2000–present

Joshua Mark Sussman is an American actor, best known for his role as Hugh Normous in Wizards of Waverly Place and his role as recurring antagonist Jacob Ben Israel in Glee. He also had a minor role on the Nickelodeon TV series Drake & Josh as Clayton.

== Biography ==
Sussman was raised in a Jewish family in Teaneck, New Jersey. He studied acting for two years at the School for Film and Television in New York City, an intense Meisner technique-based program. In the winter of 2008/2009 he took part in Birthright Israel. He resides in Los Angeles.

== Filmography ==
Filmography
Year	Title	Role	Notes
TBA	Concert Heroes		
2025	Abbott Elementary	Quiet Rider	Episode: "Karaoke"
2021	Mr. Mayor	Leslie	Guest star
2021	Superstore	Puppet Mike	Episode: "Perfect Store"
2020	Glitch Techs	Bergy	
2018	Fishbowl California	Philip	
2016	Mutt & Stuff	Enchanted Irving	Guest Star
2015	Tangerine	Retch Chunder	cameo appearance
2012	Gilliam and Scout	The Sandman	YouTube
2012	Equals Three	Guest Host	
2011	Fish Hooks	Randy Pincherson	
2010	Warren the Ape	Cecil Greenblatt	
2010	Amy Alyson Fans	Pete	
2009–2014	Glee	Jacob Ben Israel	24 episodes
2009	Stay Cool	Jungle Journalist #2	
2008–2011	Wizards of Waverly Place	Hugh Normous	8 episodes
2009	Bones	Afro Geek	
2009	The Juggler	The Pick-Up Artist	
2008	The Evening Journey	Pale Faced Boy	
2007	The Suite Life of Zack & Cody	Copy Guy	
2007	What About Brian	Ben	
2007	The Tonight Show with Jay Leno	Brian	American Idol Spoof
2007	Zip	Martin	
2005	My Crazy Life	Derek	
2004–2007	Drake & Josh	Clayton	2 episodes
