= List of songs in Glee season 3 =

Glee is an American musical comedy-drama television series produced by Fox. It focuses on the glee club New Directions, at the fictional William McKinley High School in Ohio]]. The show was created by Ryan Murphy, Brad Falchuk and Ian Brennan, and features many cover versions of songs sung on-screen by the characters. Murphy is responsible for selecting all of the songs used, and strives to maintain a balance between show tunes and chart hits, as he wants there to be "something for everybody in every episode." Once Murphy selects a song, rights are cleared with its publishers by music supervisor P.J. Bloom, and music producer Adam Anders rearranges it for the Glee cast. Numbers are pre-recorded by the cast, while choreographer Zach Woodlee constructs the accompanying dance moves, which are then taught to the cast and filmed. Studio recordings of tracks are then made. The process begins six to eight weeks before each episode is filmed, and can end as late as the day before filming begins. For the first thirteen episodes of Glee's first season, the show averaged five songs per episode, which increased to eight songs for the final nine episodes. In season two, Glee averaged six songs per episode. Murphy said in June 2011 that in season three, "I think we’ll probably end up trying to do four" songs per episode, but in actuality only one episode in the season was at or below that number, with the rest ranging from five to nine songs. The list below contains all 145 musical performances of the third season, with each performance delivering an individual song or a mashup of two or more songs in a single performance.

== Songs ==
List of songs in Glee season three
Title	Version covered	Performed by	Episode	Single	Album	Ref.
"We Got the Beat"	The Go-Gos	Rachel Berry, Santana Lopez and Brittany Pierce with New Directions	1. "The Purple Piano Project"	Yes	The Complete Season Three	
"Big Spender"	Sweet Charity	Sugar Motta	1. "The Purple Piano Project"	No	TBA	
"Ding-Dong! The Witch Is Dead"	Barbra Streisand and Harold Arlen	Rachel Berry and Kurt Hummel	1. "The Purple Piano Project"	Yes	The Complete Season Three	
"It's Not Unusual"	Tom Jones	Blaine Anderson with the McKinley High Cheerios	1. "The Purple Piano Project"	Yes	Volume 7	
"Anything Goes" / "Anything You Can Do"	Anything Goes / Annie Get Your Gun	Harmony and prospective NYADA applicants	1. "The Purple Piano Project"	Yes	The Complete Season Three	
"You Can't Stop the Beat"	Hairspray	Rachel Berry, Tina Cohen-Chang, Mercedes Jones, Kurt Hummel, Artie Abrams, and Finn Hudson with New Directions	1. "The Purple Piano Project"	Yes	Volume 7	
"Somewhere"	West Side Story	Rachel Berry and Shelby Corcoran	2. "I Am Unicorn"	Yes	Volume 7	
"I'm the Greatest Star"	Funny Girl	Kurt Hummel	2. "I Am Unicorn"	Yes	The Complete Season Three	
"Something's Coming"	West Side Story	Blaine Anderson	2. "I Am Unicorn"	Yes	The Complete Season Three	
"Spotlight"	Jennifer Hudson	Mercedes Jones with Tina Cohen-Chang and Brittany Pierce	3. "Asian F"	Yes	The Complete Season Three	
"Run the World (Girls)"	Beyoncé	Brittany Pierce and Santana Lopez with McKinley High females	3. "Asian F"	Yes	Volume 7	
"Cool"	West Side Story	Mike Chang with the McKinley High Titans	3. "Asian F"	Yes	The Complete Season Three	
"It's All Over"	Dreamgirls	Mercedes Jones with New Directions Booty Camp and Will Schuester	3. "Asian F"	Yes	The Complete Season Three	
"Out Here on My Own"	Fame	Rachel Berry and Mercedes Jones	3. "Asian F"	Yes	The Complete Season Three	
"Fix You"	Coldplay	Will Schuester with Artie Abrams and New Directions	3. "Asian F"	Yes	Volume 7	
"Bein' Green"	Kermit the Frog	Rory Flanagan	4. "Pot o' Gold"	Yes	The Complete Season Three	
"Last Friday Night (T.G.I.F.)"	Katy Perry	Blaine Anderson and New Directions except Santana Lopez	4. "Pot o' Gold"	Yes	Volume 7	
"Waiting for a Girl Like You"	Foreigner	Noah Puckerman	4. "Pot o' Gold"	Yes	The Complete Season Three	
"Candyman"	Christina Aguilera	Mercedes Jones, Santana Lopez and Brittany Pierce with the Troubletones	4. "Pot o' Gold"	Yes	The Complete Season Three	
"Take Care of Yourself" (Note: Glee: The Music, Volume 7 bonus tracks.)	Teddy Thompson	Rory Flanagan	4. "Pot o' Gold"	Yes	Volume 7	
"Tonight"	West Side Story	Rachel Berry and Blaine Anderson	5. "The First Time"	Yes	Volume 7	
"Uptown Girl"	Billy Joel	Dalton Academy Warblers	5. "The First Time"	Yes	Volume 7	
"A Boy Like That"	West Side Story	Santana Lopez and Rachel Berry	5. "The First Time"	Yes	The Complete Season Three	
"I Have a Love" (Note: Released on the same single as "A Boy Like That".)	West Side Story	Rachel Berry and Santana Lopez	5. "The First Time"	Yes	The Complete Season Three	
"America"	West Side Story	Santana Lopez and Noah Puckerman with Tina Cohen-Chang, Mike Chang, Sharks and Jets	5. "The First Time"	Yes	The Complete Season Three	
"One Hand, One Heart"	West Side Story	Blaine Anderson and Rachel Berry	5. "The First Time"	Yes	The Complete Season Three	
"Hot for Teacher"	Van Halen	Noah Puckerman with Finn Hudson, Blaine Anderson and Mike Chang	6. "Mash Off"	Yes	Volume 7	
"You and I" / "You and I"	Lady Gaga / Eddie Rabbitt and Crystal Gayle	Shelby Corcoran and Will Schuester	6. "Mash Off"	Yes	The Complete Season Three	
"Hit Me with Your Best Shot" / "One Way or Another"	Pat Benatar / Blondie	Santana Lopez and Finn Hudson with New Directions and the Troubletones	6. "Mash Off"	Yes	The Complete Season Three	
"I Can't Go for That (No Can Do)" / "You Make My Dreams"	Hall & Oates	Finn Hudson, Quinn Fabray, Rory Flanagan and Tina Cohen-Chang with New Directions	6. "Mash Off"	Yes	The Complete Season Three	
"Rumour Has It" / "Someone Like You"	Adele	Mercedes Jones, Santana Lopez and Brittany Pierce with the Troubletones	6. "Mash Off"	Yes	Volume 7	
"Perfect"	Pink	Kurt Hummel and Blaine Anderson	7. "I Kissed a Girl"	Yes	Volume 7	
"I'm the Only One"	Melissa Etheridge	Noah Puckerman	7. "I Kissed a Girl"	Yes	Volume 7	
"Girls Just Want to Have Fun"	Cyndi Lauper	Finn Hudson with New Directions males	7. "I Kissed a Girl"	Yes	Volume 7	
"Jolene"	Dolly Parton	Shannon Beiste	7. "I Kissed a Girl"	Yes	The Complete Season Three	
"I Kissed a Girl"	Katy Perry	Santana Lopez and Rachel Berry with Tina Cohen-Chang, Quinn Fabray, Mercedes Jones, Sugar Motta and Brittany Pierce	7. "I Kissed a Girl"	Yes	Volume 7	
"Constant Craving"	k.d. lang	Santana Lopez and Shelby Corcoran with Kurt Hummel	7. "I Kissed a Girl"	Yes	Volume 7	
"Red Solo Cup"	Toby Keith	Sam Evans with Quinn Fabray, Mike Chang, Noah Puckerman, Tina Cohen-Chang and New Directions	8. "Hold on to Sixteen"	Yes	Volume 7	
"Buenos Aires"	Evita	Harmony and the Unitards	8. "Hold on to Sixteen"	Yes	The Complete Season Three	
"Survivor" / "I Will Survive"	Destiny's Child / Gloria Gaynor	Santana Lopez, Mercedes Jones and Brittany Pierce with the Troubletones	8. "Hold on to Sixteen"	Yes	The Complete Season Three	
"ABC"	The Jackson 5	Tina Cohen-Chang, Mike Chang, Kurt Hummel and Quinn Fabray with New Directions	8. "Hold on to Sixteen"	Yes	Volume 7	
"Control"	Janet Jackson	Quinn Fabray, Blaine Anderson and Artie Abrams with New Directions	8. "Hold on to Sixteen"	Yes	Volume 7	
"Man in the Mirror"	Michael Jackson	Finn Hudson, Artie Abrams, Noah Puckerman, Blaine Anderson, Sam Evans and Mike Chang with New Directions	8. "Hold on to Sixteen"	Yes	Volume 7	
"We Are Young"	fun. feat. Janelle Monáe	Rachel Berry, Finn Hudson, Sam Evans, Santana Lopez, Mercedes Jones and Quinn Fabray with New Directions	8. "Hold on to Sixteen"	Yes	The Graduation Album	
"All I Want for Christmas Is You"	Mariah Carey	Mercedes Jones with New Directions Girls	9. "Extraordinary Merry Christmas"	Yes	The Christmas Album Volume 2	
"Blue Christmas"	Elvis Presley	Rory Flanagan	9. "Extraordinary Merry Christmas"	Yes	The Christmas Album Volume 2	
"River"	Joni Mitchell	Rachel Berry	9. "Extraordinary Merry Christmas"	Yes	The Christmas Album Volume 2	
"Extraordinary Merry Christmas"	Original composition	Blaine Anderson and Rachel Berry with New Directions	9. "Extraordinary Merry Christmas"	Yes	The Christmas Album Volume 2	
"Let It Snow"	Vaughn Monroe	Blaine Anderson and Kurt Hummel	9. "Extraordinary Merry Christmas"	Yes	The Christmas Album Volume 2	
"My Favorite Things"	The Sound of Music	Rachel Berry, Mercedes Jones, Kurt Hummel and Blaine Anderson	9. "Extraordinary Merry Christmas"	Yes	The Complete Season Three	
"Santa Claus Is Coming to Town"	Bruce Springsteen and the E Street Band	Finn Hudson and Noah Puckerman with Rachel Berry, Mercedes Jones, Kurt Hummel and Blaine Anderson	9. "Extraordinary Merry Christmas"	Yes	The Christmas Album Volume 2	
"Christmas Wrapping"	The Waitresses	Brittany Pierce with Santana Lopez, Tina Cohen-Chang, Mike Chang and the McKinley High Cheerios	9. "Extraordinary Merry Christmas"	Yes	The Christmas Album Volume 2	
"Do They Know It's Christmas?"	Band Aid	New Directions	9. "Extraordinary Merry Christmas"	Yes	The Christmas Album Volume 2	
"Summer Nights"	Grease	Sam Evans and Mercedes Jones with New Directions	10. "Yes/No"	Yes	Presents Glease	
"Wedding Bell Blues"	The 5th Dimension	Emma Pillsbury with Shannon Beiste and Sue Sylvester	10. "Yes/No"	Yes	The Complete Season Three	
"Moves Like Jagger" / "Jumpin' Jack Flash"	Maroon 5 feat. Christina Aguilera / The Rolling Stones	Artie Abrams with Mike Chang, Will Schuester, Blaine Anderson, Finn Hudson and Noah Puckerman	10. "Yes/No"	Yes	The Complete Season Three	
"The First Time Ever I Saw Your Face"	Roberta Flack	Rachel Berry, Tina Cohen-Chang, Santana Lopez and Mercedes Jones	10. "Yes/No"	Yes	The Complete Season Three	
"Without You"	David Guetta feat. Usher	Rachel Berry	10. "Yes/No"	Yes	The Complete Season Three	
"We Found Love"	Rihanna feat. Calvin Harris	Rachel Berry and Santana Lopez with New Directions	10. "Yes/No"	Yes	The Complete Season Three	
"Wanna Be Startin' Somethin'"	Michael Jackson	Blaine Anderson with New Directions	11. "Michael"	Yes	The Complete Season Three	
"Bad"	Michael Jackson	Artie Abrams, Blaine Anderson and Santana Lopez with New Directions and Dalton Academy Warblers	11. "Michael"	Yes	The Complete Season Three	
"Scream"	Michael Jackson and Janet Jackson	Artie Abrams and Mike Chang	11. "Michael"	Yes	The Complete Season Three	
"Never Can Say Goodbye"	The Jackson 5	Quinn Fabray	11. "Michael"	Yes	The Complete Season Three	
"Human Nature"	Michael Jackson	Mercedes Jones and Sam Evans	11. "Michael"	Yes	The Complete Season Three	
"Ben"	Michael Jackson	Kurt Hummel, Rachel Berry and Finn Hudson	11. "Michael"	Yes	The Complete Season Three	
"Smooth Criminal"	Michael Jackson	Sebastian Smythe and Santana Lopez with the Dalton Cellists	11. "Michael"	Yes	The Complete Season Three	
"I Just Can't Stop Loving You"	Michael Jackson feat. Siedah Garrett	Finn Hudson and Rachel Berry	11. "Michael"	Yes	The Complete Season Three	
"Black or White"	Michael Jackson	Artie Abrams, Rachel Berry, Santana Lopez, Kurt Hummel and Mercedes Jones with New Directions and Dalton Academy Warblers	11. "Michael"	Yes	The Complete Season Three	
"La Cucaracha"	Traditional	Will Schuester with Artie Abrams, Finn Hudson and Noah Puckerman	12. "The Spanish Teacher"	No	TBA	
"Sexy and I Know It"	LMFAO	David Martinez and Artie Abrams with New Directions	12. "The Spanish Teacher"	Yes	The Complete Season Three	
"Don't Wanna Lose You"	Gloria Estefan	Mercedes Jones	12. "The Spanish Teacher"	Yes	The Complete Season Three	
"Bamboleo" / "Hero"	Gipsy Kings / Enrique Iglesias	Sam Evans and New Directions males	12. "The Spanish Teacher"	Yes	The Complete Season Three	
"La Isla Bonita"	Madonna	David Martinez and Santana Lopez	12. "The Spanish Teacher"	Yes	The Complete Season Three	
"A Little Less Conversation"	Elvis Presley	Will Schuester with Brittany Pierce and Mike Chang	12. "The Spanish Teacher"	Yes	The Complete Season Three	
"Chapel of Love"	The Dixie Cups	Hiram Berry and LeRoy Berry	13. "Heart"	No	TBA	
"L-O-V-E"	Nat King Cole	Mike Chang and Tina Cohen-Chang	13. "Heart"	Yes	The Complete Season Three	
"Let Me Love You"	Mario	Artie Abrams with Mike Chang, Sam Evans, Kurt Hummel and Noah Puckerman	13. "Heart"	Yes	The Complete Season Three	
"Stereo Hearts"	Gym Class Heroes feat. Adam Levine	Joe Hart, Sam Evans and Mercedes Jones with Quinn Fabray and Mercedes' church choir	13. "Heart"	Yes	The Complete Season Three	
"Home"	Michael Bublé	Rory Flanagan	13. "Heart"	Yes	The Complete Season Three	
"I Will Always Love You"	Whitney Houston	Mercedes Jones	13. "Heart"	Yes	The Complete Season Three	
"You're the Top"	Anything Goes	Hiram Berry, LeRoy Berry and Rachel Berry	13. "Heart"	Yes	The Complete Season Three	
"Cherish" / "Cherish"	The Association / Madonna	Quinn Fabray, Sam Evans, Joe Hart and Mercedes Jones	13. "Heart"	Yes	The Complete Season Three	
"Love Shack"	The B-52's	Blaine Anderson, Mercedes Jones and Kurt Hummel with Rachel Berry, Brittany Pierce and the Sugar Shack patrons	13. "Heart"	Yes	The Complete Season Three	
"Cough Syrup"	Young the Giant	Blaine Anderson	14. "On My Way"	Yes	The Complete Season Three	
"Stand"	Lenny Kravitz	Dalton Academy Warblers	14. "On My Way"	Yes	The Complete Season Three	
"Glad You Came"	The Wanted	Dalton Academy Warblers	14. "On My Way"	Yes	The Complete Season Three	
"She Walks in Beauty"	Lord Byron	The Golden Goblets	14. "On My Way"	No	TBA	
"Fly" / "I Believe I Can Fly"	Nicki Minaj feat. Rihanna / R. Kelly	Rachel Berry, Artie Abrams, Santana Lopez, Blaine Anderson, Finn Hudson and Mercedes Jones with New Directions	14. "On My Way"	Yes	The Complete Season Three	
"Stronger (What Doesn't Kill You)"	Kelly Clarkson	Santana Lopez, Brittany Pierce and Mercedes Jones with the Troubletones as New Directions	14. "On My Way"	Yes	The Complete Season Three	
"Here's to Us"	Halestorm	Rachel Berry with New Directions	14. "On My Way"	Yes	The Complete Season Three	
"I'm Still Standing"	Elton John	Quinn Fabray and Artie Abrams	15. "Big Brother"	Yes	The Complete Season Three	
"Hungry Like the Wolf" / "Rio"	Duran Duran	Blaine Anderson and Cooper Anderson with New Directions	15. "Big Brother"	Yes	The Complete Season Three	
"Fighter"	Christina Aguilera	Blaine Anderson	15. "Big Brother"	Yes	The Complete Season Three	
"Up Up Up"	Givers	Artie Abrams and Quinn Fabray	15. "Big Brother"	Yes	The Complete Season Three	
"Somebody That I Used to Know"	Gotye feat. Kimbra	Blaine Anderson and Cooper Anderson	15. "Big Brother"	Yes	The Complete Season Three	
"You Should Be Dancing"	Bee Gees	Blaine Anderson, Mike Chang and Brittany Pierce	16. "Saturday Night Glee-ver"	Yes	The Complete Season Three	
"That's the Way (I Like It)" (Note: Originally a deleted scene from the pilot)	KC and the Sunshine Band	1993 McKinley High Glee Club	16. "Saturday Night Glee-ver"	No	TBA	
"Night Fever"	Bee Gees	Will Schuester, Joe Hart and Blaine Anderson with New Directions and Sue Sylvester	16. "Saturday Night Glee-ver"	Yes	The Complete Season Three	
"Disco Inferno"	The Trammps	Mercedes Jones with Santana Lopez and Brittany Pierce	16. "Saturday Night Glee-ver"	Yes	The Complete Season Three	
"If I Can't Have You"	Yvonne Elliman	Santana Lopez with New Directions	16. "Saturday Night Glee-ver"	Yes	The Complete Season Three	
"How Deep Is Your Love"	Bee Gees	Rachel Berry with the New Directions band	16. "Saturday Night Glee-ver"	Yes	The Complete Season Three	
"Boogie Shoes"	KC and the Sunshine Band	Unique Adams and Vocal Adrenaline	16. "Saturday Night Glee-ver"	Yes	The Complete Season Three	
"More Than a Woman"	Bee Gees	Finn Hudson with Rachel Berry, Blaine Anderson, Kurt Hummel, Santana Lopez, Brittany Pierce, Mike Chang, Tina Cohen-Chang and New Directions	16. "Saturday Night Glee-ver"	Yes	The Complete Season Three	
"Stayin' Alive"	Bee Gees	Finn Hudson, Mercedes Jones and Santana Lopez with New Directions and Sue Sylvester	16. "Saturday Night Glee-ver"	Yes	The Complete Season Three	
"How Will I Know"	Whitney Houston	Mercedes Jones, Santana Lopez, Kurt Hummel and Rachel Berry	17. "Dance with Somebody"	Yes	The Complete Season Three	
"I Wanna Dance with Somebody (Who Loves Me)"	Whitney Houston	Brittany Pierce and Santana Lopez with the McKinley High Cheerios	17. "Dance with Somebody"	Yes	The Complete Season Three	
"Saving All My Love for You"	Whitney Houston	Joe Hart and Quinn Fabray	17. "Dance with Somebody"	Yes	The Complete Season Three	
"So Emotional"	Whitney Houston	Santana Lopez and Rachel Berry	17. "Dance with Somebody"	Yes	The Complete Season Three	
"It's Not Right but It's Okay"	Whitney Houston	Blaine Anderson with New Directions except Kurt Hummel	17. "Dance with Somebody"	Yes	The Complete Season Three	
"I Have Nothing"	Whitney Houston	Kurt Hummel	17. "Dance with Somebody"	Yes	The Complete Season Three	
"My Love Is Your Love"	Whitney Houston	Artie Abrams, Mercedes Jones, Blaine Anderson and Kurt Hummel with New Directions	17. "Dance with Somebody"	Yes	The Complete Season Three	
"The Music of the Night"	The Phantom of the Opera	Kurt Hummel with Tina Cohen-Chang	18. "Choke"	No	TBA	
"School's Out"	Alice Cooper	Noah Puckerman	18. "Choke"	Yes	The Graduation Album	
"Cell Block Tango"	Chicago	Tina Cohen-Chang, Santana Lopez, Sugar Motta, Mercedes Jones, and Brittany Pierce	18. "Choke"	Yes	The Complete Season Three	
"Not the Boy Next Door"	The Boy from Oz	Kurt Hummel with Tina Cohen-Chang, Mercedes Jones and Brittany Pierce	18. "Choke"	Yes	The Complete Season Three	
"Don't Rain on My Parade" (Note: A complete version of this song was performed by Rachel in the season 1 episode "Sectionals"; that version was released as a single and is included on Glee: The Music, Volume 2.)	Funny Girl	Rachel Berry	18. "Choke"	No	TBA	
"The Rain in Spain"	My Fair Lady	Noah Puckerman, Finn Hudson, Blaine Anderson and Mike Chang with Sam Evans, Rory Flanagan and Joe Hart	18. "Choke"	Yes	The Complete Season Three	
"Shake It Out"	Florence + the Machine	Santana Lopez, Tina Cohen-Chang and Mercedes Jones	18. "Choke"	Yes	The Complete Season Three	
"Cry"	Kelly Clarkson	Rachel Berry	18. "Choke"	Yes	The Complete Season Three	
"Big Girls Don't Cry"	Fergie	Rachel Berry, Kurt Hummel and Blaine Anderson	19. "Prom-asaurus"	Yes	The Complete Season Three	
"Dinosaur"	Ke$ha	Brittany Pierce with the McKinley High Cheerios	19. "Prom-asaurus"	Yes	The Complete Season Three	
"Love You Like a Love Song"	Selena Gomez & the Scene	Santana Lopez with Tina Cohen-Chang and Brittany Pierce	19. "Prom-asaurus"	Yes	The Complete Season Three	
"What Makes You Beautiful"	One Direction	Joe Hart, Rory Flanagan, Artie Abrams, Sam Evans and Mike Chang	19. "Prom-asaurus"	Yes	The Complete Season Three	
"Take My Breath Away"	Berlin	Quinn Fabray and Santana Lopez	19. "Prom-asaurus"	Yes	The Complete Season Three	
"I Won't Give Up"	Jason Mraz	Rachel Berry	20. "Props"	Yes	The Graduation Album	
"Because You Loved Me"	Celine Dion	Tina Cohen-Chang as Rachel Berry	20. "Props"	Yes	The Complete Season Three	
"Always True to You in My Fashion"	Kiss Me, Kate	Carmen Tibideaux's pupil	20. "Props"	No	TBA	
"Mean"	Taylor Swift	Noah Puckerman and Shannon Beiste	20. "Props"	Yes	The Complete Season Three	
"Flashdance... What a Feeling"	Irene Cara	Rachel Berry and Tina Cohen-Chang	20. "Props"	Yes	The Complete Season Three	
"The Edge of Glory"	Lady Gaga	Santana Lopez, Mercedes Jones, Tina Cohen-Chang, Quinn Fabray, and the Troubletones as New Directions	21. "Nationals"	Yes	The Graduation Album	
"It's All Coming Back to Me Now"	Celine Dion	Rachel Berry with Blaine Anderson, Mike Chang, Tina Cohen-Chang, Quinn Fabray, Rory Flanagan and Sugar Motta	21. "Nationals"	Yes	The Complete Season Three	
"Paradise by the Dashboard Light"	Meat Loaf	New Directions	21. "Nationals"	Yes	The Complete Season Three	
"Starships"	Nicki Minaj	Unique Adams and Vocal Adrenaline	21. "Nationals"	Yes	The Complete Season Three	
"Pinball Wizard"	The Who	Unique Adams and Vocal Adrenaline	21. "Nationals"	Yes	The Complete Season Three	
"Starlight Express"	Starlight Express	The Portland Scale Blazers	21. "Nationals"	No	TBA	
"Tongue Tied"	Grouplove	Artie Abrams, Santana Lopez, Rachel Berry and Finn Hudson with New Directions	21. "Nationals"	Yes	The Complete Season Three	
"We Are the Champions"	Queen	Finn Hudson, Noah Puckerman, Santana Lopez, Rachel Berry, Kurt Hummel, Quinn Fabray, Mike Chang, and Mercedes Jones with New Directions	21. "Nationals"	Yes	The Graduation Album	
"Sit Down, You're Rockin' the Boat" (Note: Shown with audio-visual flashbacks to earlier episodes.)	Guys and Dolls	Artie Abrams, Rachel Berry, Tina Cohen-Chang, Kurt Hummel and Mercedes Jones	22. "Goodbye"	No	TBA	
"Forever Young"	Rod Stewart	Will Schuester	22. "Goodbye"	Yes	The Graduation Album	
"Single Ladies (Put a Ring on It)" (Note: Dance performance.)	Beyoncé	Burt Hummel with Tina Cohen-Chang and Brittany Pierce	22. "Goodbye"	No	TBA	
"I'll Remember"	Madonna	Kurt Hummel and New Directions	22. "Goodbye"	Yes	The Graduation Album	
"You Get What You Give"	New Radicals	Graduating members of New Directions	22. "Goodbye"	Yes	The Graduation Album	
"In My Life"	The Beatles	New Directions underclassmen and Will Schuester	22. "Goodbye"	Yes	The Complete Season Three	
"Glory Days"	Bruce Springsteen	Finn Hudson and Noah Puckerman	22. "Goodbye"	Yes	The Graduation Album	
"Roots Before Branches"	Room for Two	Rachel Berry with Finn Hudson	22. "Goodbye"	Yes	The Graduation Album	

== See also ==
- List of songs in Glee (season 1)
- List of songs in Glee (season 2)
- List of songs in Glee (season 4)
- List of songs in Glee (season 5)
- List of songs in Glee (season 6)
- Glee albums discography
