= Props (Glee) =

- Glee episode
- Episode no.: Season 3 Episode 20
- Directed by: Ian Brennan
- Written by: Ian Brennan
- Production code: 3ARC20
- Original air date: May 15, 2012

Guest appearances
- Whoopi Goldberg as Carmen Tibideaux; Dot-Marie Jones as Coach Beiste; Chord Overstreet as Sam Evans / Rory Flanagan; Eric Bruskotter as Cooter Menkins; Samuel Larsen as Joe Hart / Mike Chang; Damian McGinty as Rory Flanagan / Sam Evans; Vanessa Lengies as Sugar Motta / Quinn Fabray; Alex Newell as Wade Adams

Episode chronology
← Previous "Prom-asaurus"	Next → "Nationals"
- Glee season 3

"Props" is the twentieth episode of the third season of the American musical television series Glee, and the sixty-fourth overall. Written and directed by Ian Brennan, the episode is the first of two new episodes that aired back-to-back on Fox in the United States on May 15, 2012. It features New Directions preparing a heavily props-dependent routine for the impending Nationals competition, an extended sequence in which Tina (Jenna Ushkowitz) has a vision of the glee club having swapped roles, including herself as Rachel, and an appearance by special guest star Whoopi Goldberg as NYADA dean Carmen Tibideaux.

The episode received mostly positive reviews overall, though reaction to the musical performances was not as strong. The body-swap sequence was given an enthusiastic reception. The scenes featuring Coach Beiste (Dot-Marie Jones) and Puck (Mark Salling) were also much praised, and in particular the pair's acting was highlighted. Their performance of the song "Mean", by contrast, received the most divergent reactions from reviewers, yet it was the one song from the four singles released from the episode to chart in North America, and debuted on the Billboard Canadian Hot 100.

Upon its initial airing, this episode was viewed by 6.09 million American viewers and received a 2.5/8 Nielsen rating/share in the 18–49 demographic. The total viewership was down significantly from "Prom-asaurus" the week before.

== Plot ==
When New Directions starts planning a setlist for the impending Nationals competition, Tina (Jenna Ushkowitz) is frustrated that Rachel (Lea Michele) is again singing lead while she remains stuck in the background, and walks out. When Rachel tries to bribe her to withdraw her objections, she tells Rachel that she wants to experience a standing ovation of her own. Tina later falls into a fountain and strikes her head, which causes her to experience a vision in which all of the glee club members have switched roles,—most notably, she sees herself as Rachel and Rachel as Tina. "Rachel" performs "Because You Loved Me", and the club gives her a standing ovation. She thanks "Tina" for her support, and "Tina" in turn gives "Rachel" advice on how to salvage her failed NYADA audition. After Tina comes back to reality, she conveys that advice: Rachel should see NYADA dean Carmen Tibideaux (Whoopi Goldberg) in person—she is conducting a master class at Oberlin. Tina drives Rachel there, but Carmen has been annoyed by Rachel's repeated messages and says she does not deserve any special attention. Tina disagrees, telling Carmen that although Rachel gets whatever she wants and is "a pain in the ass", Rachel gets it all because she is exceptional. Rachel invites Carmen to attend their Nationals performance, and pledges to audition for NYADA every year until she is accepted.

Sue (Jane Lynch) announces that rival glee club Vocal Adrenaline is the team to beat, thanks mostly to its transgender lead singer Wade "Unique" Adams (Alex Newell), who has become a media star. Sue decides that New Directions needs a similar gimmick to win and she tells Kurt (Chris Colfer) to dress in drag, but he adamantly refuses. Puck (Mark Salling) dons a dress and volunteers to lead the drag number, but Will (Matthew Morrison) vetoes the gimmickry and refocuses the group on its choreography.

Santana (Naya Rivera), Brittany (Heather Morris), and Mercedes (Amber Riley) are worried because Coach Beiste (Dot-Marie Jones) has not left her abusive husband, Cooter (Eric Bruskotter), as she claimed. Beiste tells them that adult relationships are more complex and insists she is fine. Hockey player Rick "The Stick" (Rock Anthony) ridicules Puck for being seen in the dress; they agree to a fight outside the school. Rick gains the upper hand and Puck is thrown into a dumpster, but he emerges brandishing a switchblade. Coach Beiste breaks up the fight; in the locker room, Puck tells her that the knife is a fake stage prop, and she retorts that he could have gotten expelled. Puck replies that he is flunking out anyway and a failure, telling her that she does not know what it feels like to be worthless. He breaks down, and Beiste comforts him as he cries. At home, Beiste tells Cooter that she is leaving him, and removes her wedding ring. He asks who else would love her; she answers: "Me". Back at the school auditorium, she joins Puck in singing "Mean", tells him that she has arranged for him to retake a crucial test to graduate, and promises to help him pass. As the episode ends, Rachel and Tina sing "Flashdance... What a Feeling", and board the glee club's bus to Nationals.

== Production ==
This episode was written by Glee co-creator Ian Brennan, who also made his directorial debut in this episode. While the first scenes for the episode were shot on March 30, 2012, on a day that also saw scenes shot for the previous two episodes, shooting on the episode began in earnest on Monday, April 9, 2012, after the completion of the prior episode at the end of the week before. Filming continued into the following week at least through Wednesday, April 18, 2012, by which point the next episode had begun shooting in parallel.

The plot has Tina suffering a "mild" head injury—she falls into a fountain—that causes her to see an alternate reality version of New Directions: actors playing club members had to swap roles with another actor in the cast. Chris Colfer, who normally plays Kurt Hummel, said that the portrayals "were really hard to nail—they're not over the top by any means". Pairs who are swapping roles include Tina and Rachel, Kurt and Finn (Cory Monteith), Mike (Harry Shum Jr.) and Joe (Samuel Larsen), Puck and Blaine (Darren Criss), Artie (Kevin McHale) and Santana (Naya Rivera), Quinn (Dianna Agron) and Sugar (Vanessa Lengies), Rory (Damian McGinty) and Sam (Chord Overstreet), Mercedes (Amber Riley) and Brittany (Heather Morris), and Will (Matthew Morrison) and Sue (Jane Lynch).

In addition to those mentioned above, other recurring roles include football coach Shannon Beiste (Jones) and her husband, football recruiter Cooter Menkins (Bruskotter), and Newell as Vocal Adrealine lead singer Wade "Unique" Adams. Special guest star Whoopi Goldberg returns for a second appearance as NYADA dean Carmen Tibideaux.

Four songs from the episode were released in the US as singles available for digital download: Taylor Swift's "Mean" performed by Jones and Salling, Jason Mraz's "I Won't Give Up" performed by Michele, Irene Cara's "Flashdance... What a Feeling" performed by Michele and Ushkowitz, and Celine Dion's "Because You Loved Me" performed by Ushkowitz as Rachel. "I Won't Give Up" is also featured on the soundtrack album Glee: The Music, The Graduation Album. A fifth song, an excerpt of "Always True to You in My Fashion" from Kiss Me Kate, is performed by an unnamed male student (Derek L. Butler) singing in a master class for Carmen; it was not released as a single.

== Reception ==
=== Ratings ===
"Props" was first broadcast on May 15, 2012 in the United States on Fox. It aired at the usual time for an episode as the first hour in a two-hour special evening with "Nationals" as the second hour. It received a 2.5/8 Nielsen rating/share in the 18–49 demographic, and attracted 6.09 million American viewers during its initial airing, down from the 2.7/8 rating/share and 6.67 million viewers of the previous episode, "Prom-asaurus", which was broadcast on May 8, 2012. Viewership was down significantly in Canada, which also aired the episode as the first hour of a two-episode special, where 1.34 million viewers watched the episode on the same day as its American premiere, down over 18%. It was the fourteenth most-viewed show of the week, down from thirteenth in the previous week, when 1.65 million viewers watched "Prom-asaurus".

Although the United Kingdom also aired these two episodes together, viewership rose rather than fell. "Props" first aired on May 17, 2012, and was watched on Sky 1 by 795,000 viewers. This was an increase of nearly 7% from the previous episode, "Prom-asaurus", which attracted 744,000 viewers when it aired the week before. In Australia, "Props" was broadcast on May 17, 2012, but unlike in the other three countries, it was the only episode broadcast that week. It was watched by 607,000 viewers, a decrease of over 4% from the 636,000 viewers for "Prom-asaurus" on May 10, 2012. Glee was the seventeenth most-watched program of the night, down from thirteenth the week before.

=== Critical reception ===
The episode received mostly positive reviews. John Kubicek of BuddyTV called it "easily my favorite episode of the past two seasons, and quite possibly one of the best episodes the show has ever made". Damian Holbrook of TV Guide described it and the episode that followed, "Nationals", as "clever, funny and filled with moments that felt like little gifts to the fans who have hung in there". Houston Chronicle's Bobby Hankinson said the "double feature continued the recent hot streak" of episodes, and Michael Slezak of TVLine highlighted this episode's "script that winkingly acknowledged fan complaints that Ryan Murphy & Co. all too often ignore some of Glee's original players in favor of new and more-hyped flavors". The A.V. Club's Emily VanDerWerff wrote that it showcased writer and director Ian Brennan's "strengths of acid comedy and sad stories of small-town teenagers who'll never get anything but to sweat it out on the streets of a runaway American dream"; she gave "Props" a "B" grade. Rae Votta of Billboard said, "It felt organically Glee, zany but with heart."

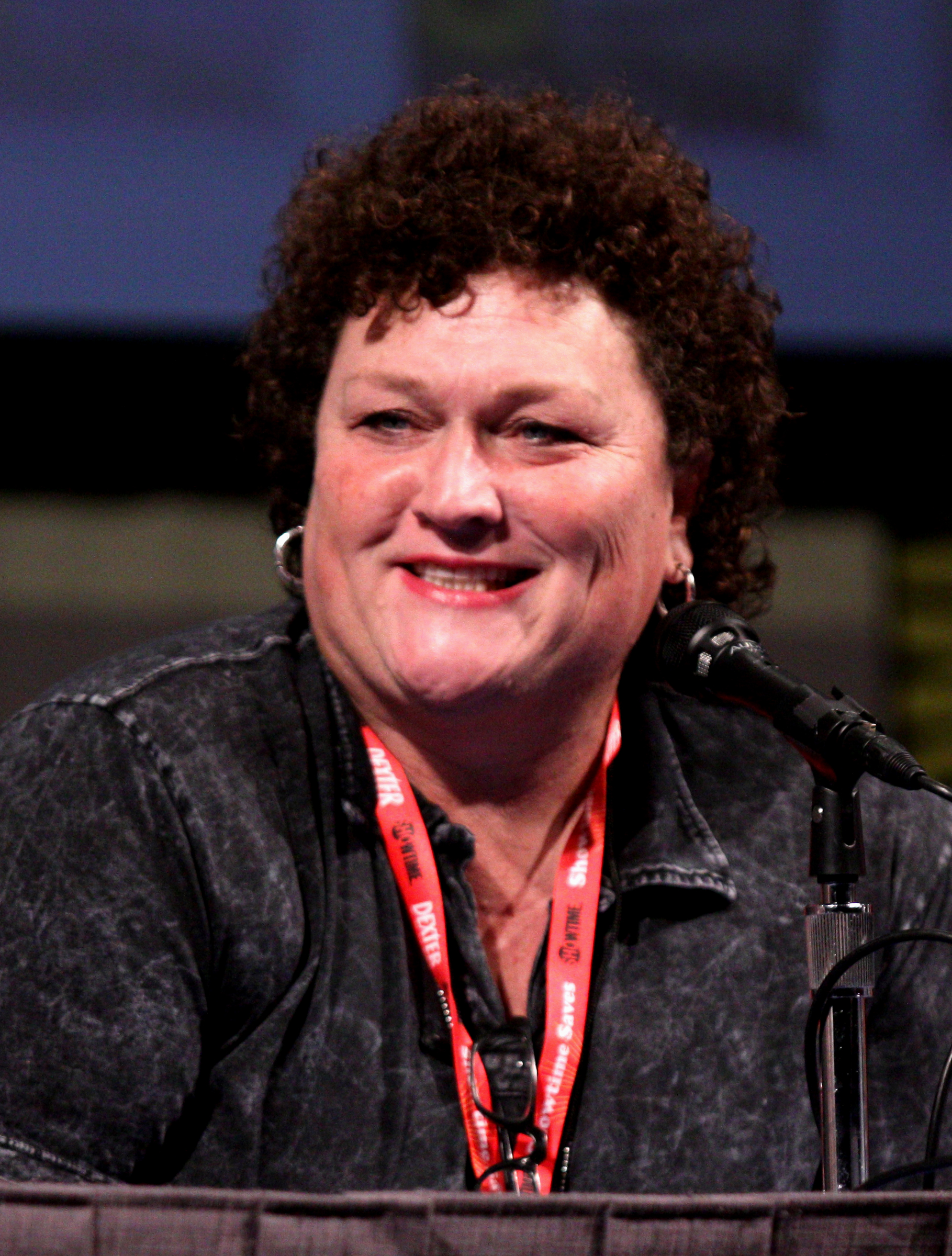
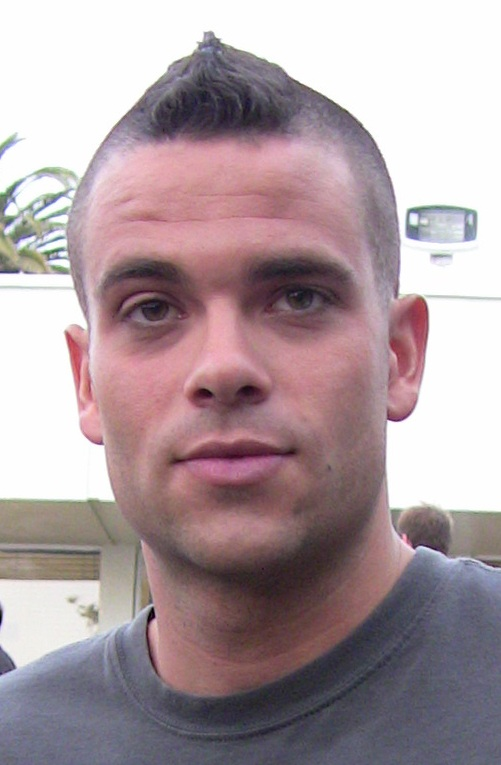
The scenes between Coach Beiste (Jones, left) and Puck (Salling, right) were much praised by reviewers.

E! Online's Jenna Mullins thought the body-swap sequence "breathed fresh 'n' crazy air into Glee", and Kubicek called it "the best thing Glee has ever done and will ever do". Jyll Saskin of MTV said it was "super trippy, makes no sense plot-wise" and was a "totally awesome Glee moment"; Entertainment Weekly's Erin Strecker wrote that "the entire cast deserved an MVP award for their completely on-point mannerisms", and singled out "Finn and Puck all snuggly together, holding hands and dressed up like Kurt and Blaine". VanDerWerff, however, described it as a "totally odd curiosity that comes out of nowhere", and said that the car trip taken by Tina and Rachel later in the episode was more successful at showing Tina "what Rachel's life is like". Kubicek called the offer of the trip and subsequent drive a "sweet bonding moment" between the pair, and called it "great" that "Tina is the one who saves the day" at the meeting with Carmen, but Chaney wondered why it took Rachel two episodes to regain her drive and aspirations.

The scenes with Puck and Beiste were much praised, as were the actors. While reviewers such as Bell and VanDerWerff criticized the domestic abuse storyline, both were far happier with the way it was ended than with how it had been introduced in "Choke"—VanDerWerff wrote that "the fact that both Puck and Beiste's storylines resolve at the same time in the same scene is a nice piece of writing, with some strong acting". Votta called the pair's scenes "delightful" and thought they merited a "road trip adventure spin-off"; Bell said that she "could have seriously watched an hour dedicated to Beiste and Puck". Slezak highlighted "terrific work" by Jones and Salling, and the scenes with "Beiste holding a sobbing Puck" and confronting Cooter as "pretty remarkable". Strecker called the latter scene "painful to watch, in the best possible way", and Bell described Salling's performance in the former as "truly incredible".

=== Music and performances ===
The musical performances were greeted with somewhat less enthusiasm than the episode as a whole, and given mixed to positive reviews. An example of this was the song's opening number, "I Won't Give Up". Saskin wrote that "Rachel sings Jason Mraz, like everything else, beautifully", while Rolling Stone's Erica Futterman credits her for having made a "sappy ballad mildly more tolerable". Strecker gave the performance a "B+" grade and called it a "classic Berry power ballad"; "B" grades were given by Slezak and Washington Post's Jen Chaney, who also noted Rachel's "vocal power".

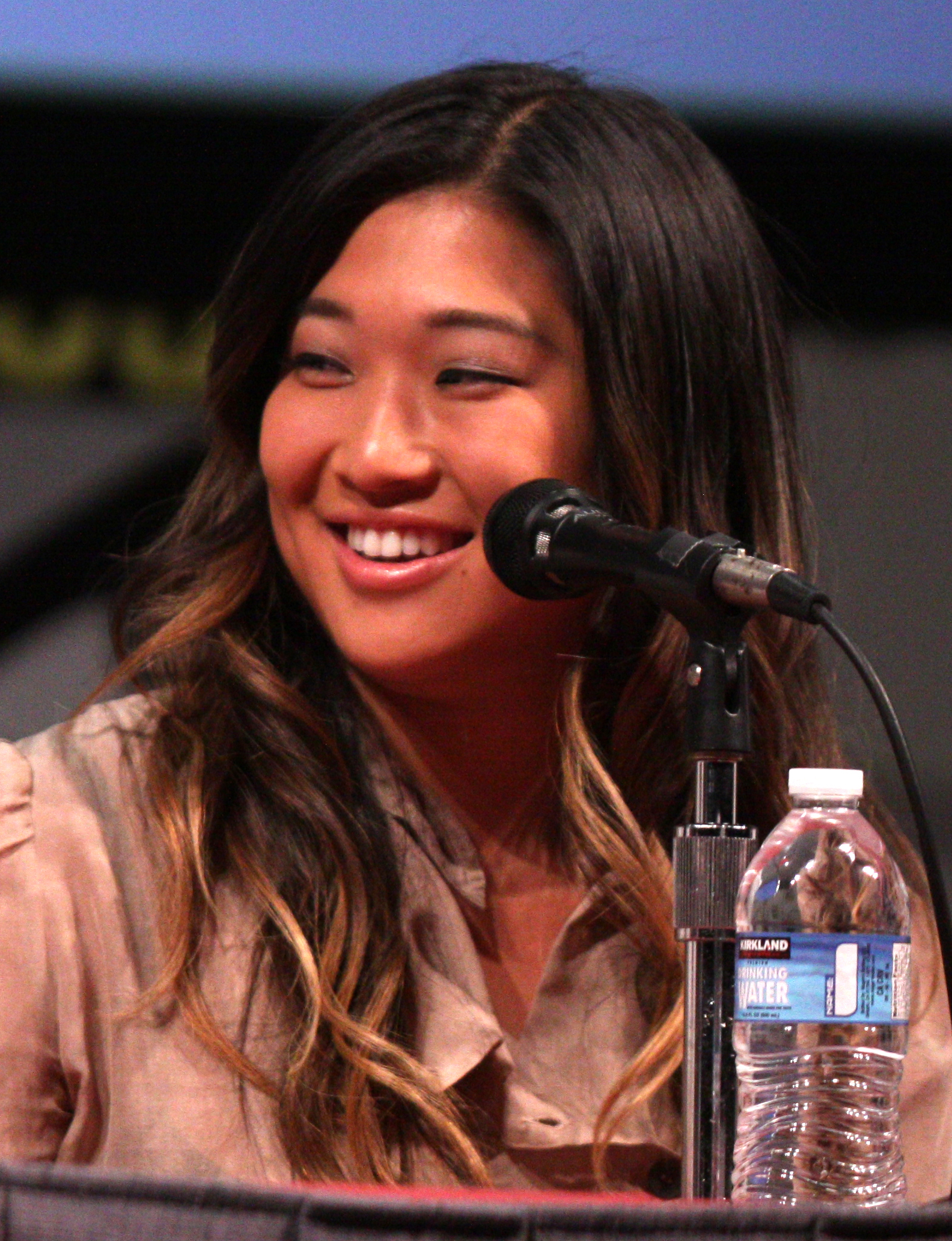
"Because You Loved Me", sung by Ushkowitz (pictured) as Rachel, was well received

"Because You Loved Me" performed by Tina as Rachel received the most consistently positive reviews, though both Chaney, who gave the song an "A−", and Strecker, who graded it a "B+", stated their belief that the real Rachel would have done it better, and Saskin was more blunt: "We love you, Tina, but you just can't belt like Rachel". Futterman was the most pleased, and wrote: "The richness of her voice removes some of the Lite FM softness embedded in the tune, and it really is great to see Tina get a song that suits her vocal abilities".

The most divergent views were expressed about Puck and Beiste's performance of "Mean". Crystal Bell of Huffington Post asked, "How could you not be moved by their duet in the auditorium?" E! Online's Jenna Mullins called it "one of the highlights of the season", and Slezak gave it a grade of "A". Chaney's "B+" followed her statement that "it was more effective than Swift's version because I can believe that both Puck and Beiste have had it rough", and Strecker described it as "lovely and thematically perfect" and gave it a "B". VanDerWerff said he "could have done without" their duet, and Futterman was even harsher: "it was quite unfortunate". Houston Chronicle's Bobby Hankinson wrote that he "sort of liked" how the pair were "simultaneously improving upon and butchering a Taylor Swift song", and Saskin characterized it as "heartfelt and passionate".

Futterman said of "Flashdance... What a Feeling" that "there was a glimmer of old-school Glee in the performance, carefree underdog status that made me smile". Saskin and Chaney both found the performance lacking; the former wrote that "something about this version falls flat", and Chaney gave it a "B−" and said it "wasn't as soaring as it could have been", though "Rachel and Tina's bonding moment was sweet" and she liked "the way it took us from hour one into hour two and Nationals". Slezak and Strecker both gave the performance an "A−".

=== Chart history ===
One of the four singles released for the episode, "Mean", charted on the Billboard Canadian Hot 100 at number 71, which was higher than either of the two songs that debuted on that chart from "Nationals" in the same week; none of these songs charted in the US. One other single from the episode, "I Won't Give Up", though it did not sell well enough to chart on the US Billboard Hot 100 the week it was released, affected the charting there of the Jason Mraz original, which moved up from 34 to 29 on the Hot 100; it had previously charted as high as number eight.
