= The Spanish Teacher =

- Glee episode
- Episode no.: Season 3 Episode 12
- Directed by: Paris Barclay
- Written by: Ian Brennan
- Production code: 3ARC12
- Original air date: February 7, 2012

Guest appearances
- Ricky Martin as David Martinez; Iqbal Theba as Principal Figgins; Dot-Marie Jones as Coach Beiste; Chord Overstreet as Sam Evans; NeNe Leakes as Roz Washington; Damian McGinty as Rory Flanagan; Vanessa Lengies as Sugar Motta; Lauren Potter as Becky Jackson; LaMarcus Tinker as Shane Tinsley; Mary Gillis as Mrs. Hagberg; John Marshall as Chili; Roger Keller as Bill; Brenda Ballard as Stephanie

Episode chronology
← Previous "Michael"	Next → "Heart"
- Glee season 3

"The Spanish Teacher" is the twelfth episode of the third season of the American musical television series Glee, and the fifty-sixth overall. Written by co-creator Ian Brennan and directed by Paris Barclay, the episode aired on Fox in the United States on February 7, 2012. Ricky Martin guest stars in it as a night-school Spanish teacher whom Will Schuester (Matthew Morrison) introduces to McKinley High, and shows several of McKinley's teachers competing for a promotion when a tenured position unexpectedly becomes available.

The episode received mixed to positive reviews, and many critics considered Martin to be a highlight. Reaction to the music as a whole was less enthusiastic than for the episode itself, though "La Isla Bonita" and "Don't Wanna Lose You" were given a generally favorable reception. The former song charted on both the Billboard Hot 100 and the Billboard Canadian Hot 100; of the remaining four singles, "Sexy and I Know It" debuted on the Billboard Hot 100, and the other three singles did not chart.

Upon its initial airing, this episode was viewed by 7.81 million American viewers and received a 3.3/9 Nielsen rating/share in the 18–49 demographic. The total viewership was down significantly from the special tribute episode, "Michael", which aired the previous week.

== Plot ==
The retirement of a history teacher opens a tenured position at McKinley High. Spanish teacher Will Schuester (Matthew Morrison) and cheerleading coach Sue Sylvester (Jane Lynch) both want the promotion, but anonymous students have registered complaints about the pair. Determined to polish up his language skills, Will goes to night school for a refresher course and meets instructor David Martinez (Ricky Martin), who points out that kids learn better through music. Will assigns a Spanish-themed week to New Directions and David helps by singing "Sexy and I Know It" partially in Spanish. Santana (Naya Rivera) suggests that Will now has a rival and needs to defend his honor.

Rachel (Lea Michele) tells Kurt (Chris Colfer) and Mercedes (Amber Riley) that she has accepted Finn's (Cory Monteith) marriage proposal. Kurt later tells Finn that he would be lucky to have Rachel some day, but he believes Finn is considering matrimony because he has given up too early on his own dreams.

Mercedes is torn between her feelings for Sam (Chord Overstreet) and her boyfriend Shane (LaMarcus Tinker). Guidance counselor Emma Pillsbury (Jayma Mays) recommends that Mercedes and Sam stop speaking to each other for a week so they can hear what their hearts are telling them. Mercedes sings "Don't Wanna Lose You" and Sam reciprocates by singing a mash-up of "Bamboléo" and "Hero".

Sue's position as coach of the Cheerios is challenged by the synchronized swim coach, Roz Washington (NeNe Leakes). Roz is also pursuing the tenured position, and she views herself as a serious competitor for tenure and for replacing Sue on the Cheerios. She believes Sue's coaching style and cheerleading choreography are old-fashioned, and plans to update the team if she becomes the new coach.

Sue reveals her desire to become a mother and asks Will to be the sperm donor. When Will's fiancée, Emma, confronts her about this request, Sue admits that she wants Will's capacity for kindness for her child. Emma and Will's relationship becomes strained as he focuses on impressing Principal Figgins (Iqbal Theba) to win tenure, and denigrates her newest set of counseling pamphlets. He is surprised when Coach Beiste (Dot-Marie Jones) enthusiastically praises Emma for her recent pamphlet on genital sanitation, which has just been adopted by the Big Ten football teams.

Santana and David duet with "La Isla Bonita" and Will responds with a bilingual rendition of "A Little Less Conversation" while dressed as a matador, which offends Santana. Will accuses her of complaining about him, and she says she did so because of the negative Latin stereotypes he has been perpetuating. She then asks him why he decided to become a Spanish teacher, to which he responds that it was the only open position at the time. Santana tells Will that he shows real passion with the Glee Club and should stick to it. Sue discovers that Cheerios co-captain Becky Jackson (Lauren Potter) was the one who complained about her coaching. Becky believed that Sue had become less focused on the squad, to its detriment, and Sue praises her devotion to the team.

Will arranges with Figgins to become the new history teacher, and successfully proposes David to be his replacement as Spanish teacher. Ultimately, Emma is the one who is given tenure.

== Production ==
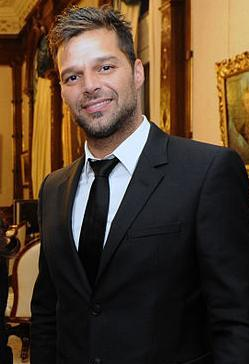
Ricky Martin (pictured) sent a tweet about applying to be a Spanish teacher at Glee's McKinley High School

On November 29, 2011, the day news broke that Ricky Martin had "closed a deal" with Glee to guest star in an early 2012 episode, Martin himself tweeted, "I hear McKinley high has an opening for a Spanish teacher... Maybe I’ll apply. ;o)". It was rumored he would be a recurring character and a romance would begin with recurring character from season 1 April who was rumored to appear in season 3, but this did not happen. He turned out to be only a guest.

The episode was written by co-creator Ian Brennan and directed by Paris Barclay, and began filming on January 5, 2012, with Martin in attendance; he had recorded his songs the day before. He finished filming his scenes that week, ending early in the morning of January 7, 2012. The previous episode—the Michael Jackson tribute—had not yet completed, and the two episodes continued in parallel until the final Michael Jackson number was shot on January 13, 2012, the same day that the thirteenth episode commenced filming.

One of the songs Martin performs is a Spanglish version of LMFAO's "Sexy and I Know It", as part of a competition with Morrison's character, who sings an Elvis Presley song in Spanish, "A Little Less Conversation. Martin's other musical number, Madonna's "La Isla Bonita", is a duet with Rivera. The two remaining numbers performed in the episode include a mash-up of "Bamboleo" by the Gipsy Kings and "Hero" by Enrique Iglesias, performed by Overstreet with the other New Directions males, and Gloria Estefan's "Don't Wanna Lose You" performed by Riley. The six cover versions have been released as five singles for digital download, with the two-song mash-up in one single. The brief, flashback performance of "La Cucaracha" was not released as a single.

Recurring guest stars who appear in the episode include glee club members Sam Evans (Overstreet), Rory Flanagan (Damian McGinty) and Sugar Motta (Vanessa Lengies), Principal Figgins (Theba), synchronized swimming coach Roz Washington (NeNe Leakes), cheerleading co-captain Becky Jackson (Potter), football player Shane Tinsley (Tinker), football coach Shannon Beiste (Jones) and tenured history teacher Mrs. Hagberg (Mary Gillis).

== Reception ==
=== Ratings ===
"The Spanish Teacher" was first broadcast on February 7, 2012, in the United States on Fox. It received a 3.3/9 Nielsen rating/share in the 18–49 demographic, and attracted 7.81 million American viewers during its initial airing, a significant decrease from the 3.7/10 rating/share and 9.07 million viewers of the previous episode, the Michael Jackson tribute "Michael", which was broadcast on January 31, 2012. Viewership also decreased significantly in Canada, where 1.57 million viewers watched the episode on the same day as its American premiere. It was the fifteenth most-viewed show of the week, down five slots and 14% from the 1.84 million viewers who watched "Michael" the previous week.

In the United Kingdom, "The Spanish Teacher" first aired on March 15, 2012, and was watched on Sky 1 by 771,000 viewers. Viewership was up over 13% from "Michael", which attracted 682,000 viewers when it aired the week before. In Australia, "The Spanish Teacher" was broadcast on March 2, 2012. It was watched by 564,000 viewers, which made Glee the twelfth most-watched program of the night, up from thirteenth the week before. The viewership was up over 5% from the previous episode, "Michael", which was seen by 535,000 viewers.

=== Critical reception ===
"The Spanish Teacher" was given mixed to positive reviews. Emily VanDerWerff of The A.V. Club wrote that "much of this episode felt like a very deliberate throwback to season one, in some very good ways", and IGN's Robert Canning said that "the overarching storylines on Glee have become far more engaging than what we saw in the first half of the season". John Kubicek of BuddyTV stated that the episode "does a lot of things right when it comes to the plot", and Billboard's Rae Votta described the plot as "consistent and well managed, with believable motivation, response and action all around". However, Jen Chaney of The Washington Post wrote that the episode "brought more narrative developments that didn’t make sense", and Rolling Stone's Erica Futterman stated that aside from Martin's scenes, "the rest of the episode found us back in scatterbrained plot territory". Amy Reiter of The Los Angeles Times liked the episode and described it as "the kind that makes you belly-laugh and chortle and snicker despite your better judgment".

The introduction of Ricky Martin as David Martinez was welcomed by most reviewers. Futterman wrote that "Ricky Martin carried on the Gwyneth Paltrow tradition of pretty great guest teacher cameos", and TVLine's Michael Slezak said that the episode was good "at least whenever Ricky Martin appeared on screen". VanDerWerff called him "fun and infectious", and Kate Stanhope of TV Guide said he "showed himself to be a guest star with mucho potential". Kubicek, though he said Martin was "great at singing", found him "kind of dull as an actor", and Canning said Martin "felt out of place" in the episode.

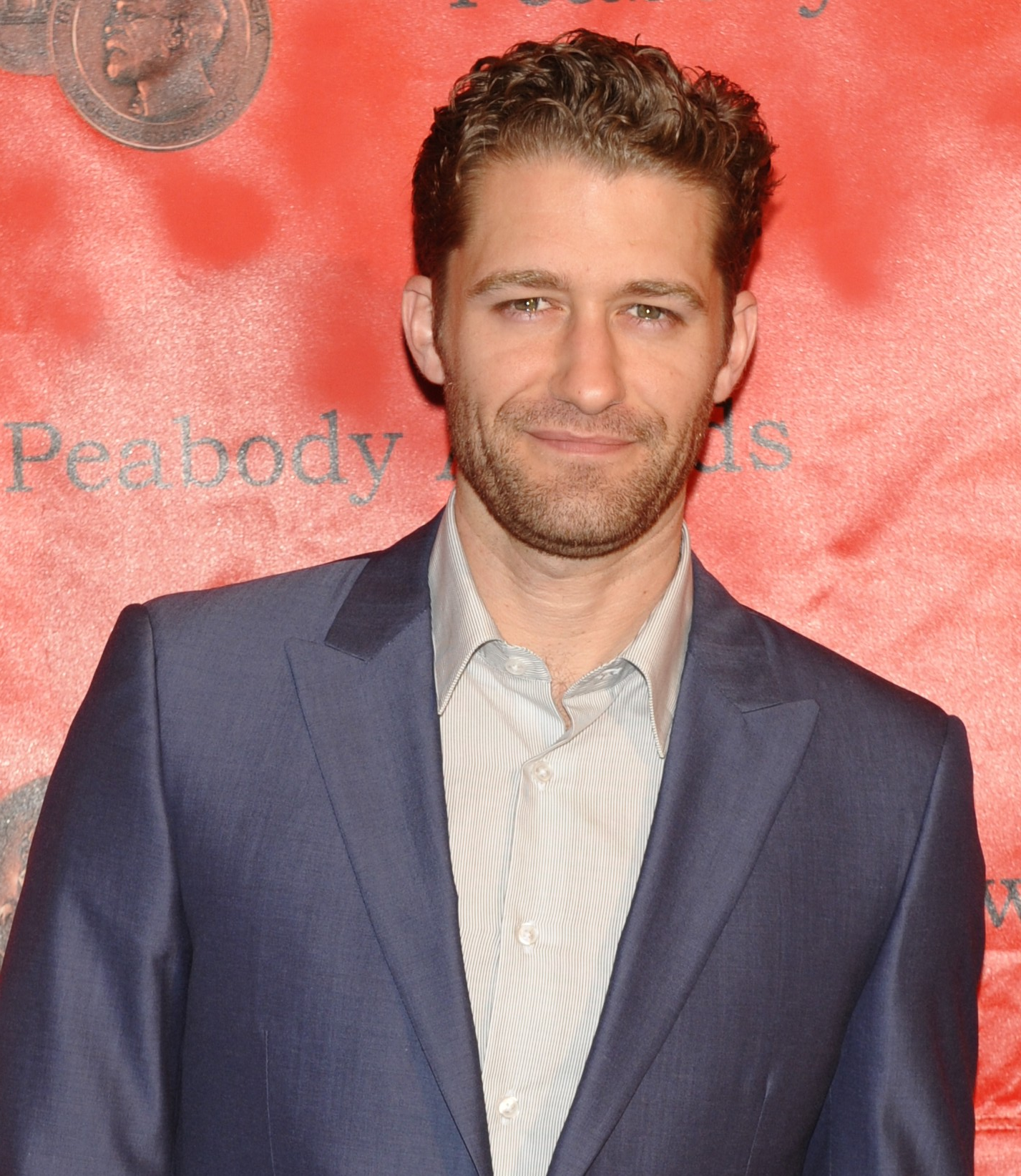
Reviewers were surprised that Will (Morrison, pictured), a Spanish teacher, "hadn't even mastered the basics of the language".

Although Canning wrote that "the writers did a fine job of incorporating the tenure, Will's terrible Spanish and the songs into the storylines", Will's lack of Spanish skills was questioned by other reviewers. Entertainment Weekly's Joseph Brannigan Lynch said this did not "seem to gel with the passionate Will Schuester I remember from season 1", and Slezak expressed surprise that "he hadn't even mastered the basics of the language!", as did Chaney. Slezak also said Will, as evidenced by his "La Cucaracha" rendition for his class, was "suddenly dumb as the cardboard box that Finn winningly turned into a robot head", and Chaney commented, "Mr. Schuester always seemed a bit more sensitive than this." VanDerWerff wrote of "the weird, dark despair at the heart of Will's plight: He's a high school Spanish teacher, and he mostly is that because he doesn't know what else to do." She added, "I think this was probably the best episode for the character since early season one." Canning stated that "the tension between Will and Emma was a welcome change", and Votta commented on the episode's less dramatic ending with Will's apology and "celebrating Emma's new-found tenure with a dinner" with the conclusion, "sometimes you don't need a big bang to get oomph out of an episode". Chaney, however, was puzzled as to why Emma was given teaching tenure "when she's been working at McKinley as a guidance counselor and handing out absolutely horrifying self-made pamphlets".

The scene between Sue and Roz was singled out by many reviewers. Bell wrote that she was "really loving the feisty dynamic" between them, and that it was "about time that Sue had a proper sparring partner". Flandez called Roz "the delightfully colorful synchronized swimming teacher", and said her "scathing remarks were expertly delivered" and that there were "too many good lines to savor". Futterman said Roz reminded her of "what an entertaining spitfire Sue was during season one", and that Sue is "a shadow of [her] former self" as evidenced by the fact that Roz has not been a victim of Sue's "evil planning". Lynch described the encounter as "one of the episode highlights", though he felt that "the writers overdid it a touch" when Sue "barely got in any retorts" against Roz. Reiter called Roz "a great addition to the cast of characters" and Leakes "spot-on" in the role, also hearkening back to the early Sue. Kubicek said he "might like this subplot" if Leakes did not mistake "shouting for acting", and Slezak commented on Roz's "particularly abhorrent assessment of Sue’s reproductive abilities". Votta, however, declared that the show "should never let NeNe go", and said she "delivers some of the best lines ever". Chaney and Slezak thought that Sue should have been fired immediately for requesting sperm donations from New Directions males, while Lynch merely deemed it a possible detriment to her tenure bid. Kubicek thought the pregnancy storyline should move forward "because Sue becoming a mommy has comedic potential written all over it".

A "highlight" for Lynch was the scene where Kurt, Mercedes and Rachel were watching Twilight together, not only because the "friendship between Kurt and Mercedes" has been "sadly downplayed", but because it was "nice to see the Glee kids just being kids sometimes". The subsequent conversation between Kurt and Finn in the locker room was described by Canning as "one of the truest moments of the season so far". Votta wrote, "Chris Colfer and Cory Monteith often shine together in scenes, especially one-on-one, and this is no exception." Another duo that reviewers complimented was Mercedes and Sam. Futterman, while she criticized the episode for setting "its scope too wide", credited their storyline as the "only one played out strongly enough through dialogue and song". Votta stated that "Glee is getting more romantic tension mileage out of this duo than you can shake a stick at, and it's delicious, especially with Valentine's around the corner", and Canning noted that their week-long verbal silence "helped build their relationship into something we care more about". Chaney, however, could not see the sense in Mercedes bringing Sam with her "to see Miss Pillsbury to sort out her conflicted feelings for Sam and Shane".

=== Music and performances ===
The musical performances received a mixed response from reviewers. Votta said that "the songs were mostly forgettable and generally useless to advancing the plot", and Canning maintained that "the music this week was just okay". Although VanDerWerff called the musical numbers "mostly superfluous", he described many of them as "pretty fun", while Bobby Hankinson of The Houston Chronicle said he "wasn’t incredibly moved by this week’s Spanish-flavored selections".

"Sexy and I Know It" was reviewed positively by HuffPost TV's Crystal Bell, who cited Martin's "incredibly sexy performance". Slezak gave the number an enthusiastic "Oh dear God, please yes", "bonus points" and an "A" grade. Chaney declared that "Martin did what he does very well: dance and sing with high intensity", though she wished "they had chosen a better song" and gave it a "B−"; the latter sentiment was echoed by Lynch, who called the song "idiotic" and gave it a slightly lower "C+". Futterman characterized it as a "rousing number that toes the line of being too risque for a high school classroom", though Kubicek thought that having "a teacher grinding with students" was "wildly inappropriate" if "hot and pretty entertaining". MTV's Kevin P. Sullivan, however, called it "one of the most eye-brow-raising musical numbers" in the show's history, "bizarre", and "a Rory-dancing, Finn-flailing fail". VanDerWerff was also critical, and described it as "dumb and stupid and wrong".

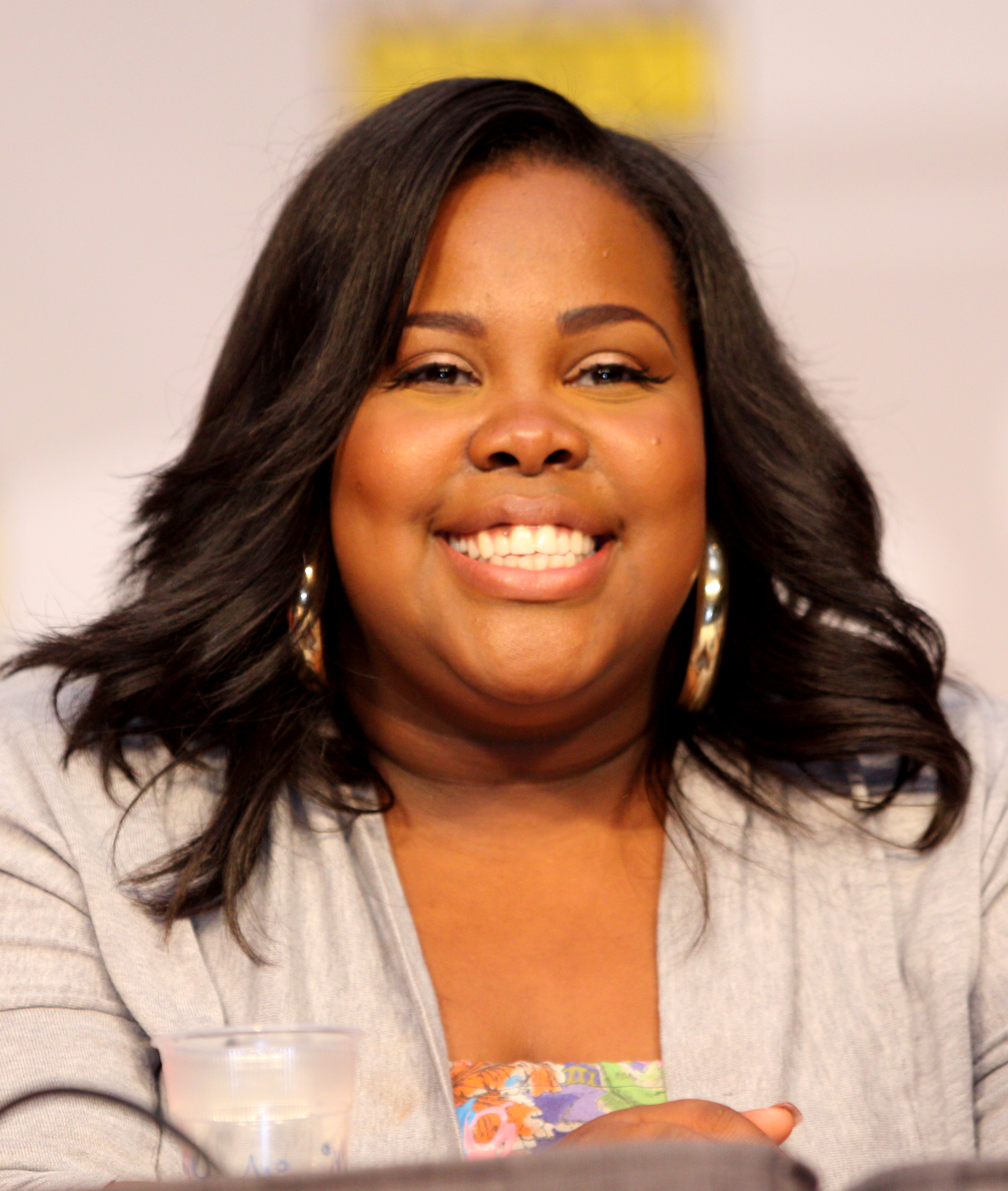
"Don't Wanna Lose You" was the latest "really strong" number sung by Mercedes (Riley, pictured) in the third season.

Slezak stated that "Mercedes' musical moments in Season 3 have been really strong" and that "Don't Wanna Lose You" was "no exception"; he gave it a "B+" grade. Lynch gave an "A–" and wrote, "It's been a treat to hear her develop the softer side of her voice." Chaney said that "the number was fine, just not particularly interesting" and gave it a "C", but Futterman declared that Mercedes "brings a richness and power and commendable Spanish pronunciation to Gloria Estefan's song". Lynch called the "Bamboleo" / "Hero" mash-up "another Samcedes winner" and gave it a "B", and Chaney said it was a "fun choice" that "would have been a fun number" without the "constant" focus on the hipster boots, and graded it "C+". Sullivan agreed that the boots were better not seen, but that "the song actually worked"; he also noted that "Sam can sound a hell of a lot like" Iglesias. Futterman also heard the resemblance between Sam and Iglesias, though she said "the performance lacks the fire and sex appeal of the originals". Raymund Flandez of The Wall Street Journal described it as "the corniest number in several seasons".

Futterman called "La Isla Bonita" the "best number of the night". She added that it "mixes slick dance moves and spot-on singing with perhaps a touch too much sexual tension for a student/teacher pairing". Slezak said that "the harmonies were sweet, and the dancing was sexy without crossing the line into disturbing April–October territory" and gave it an "A−". Votta wrote that "the pair don't have any chemistry", but that "they're both very pretty to look at and listen to" and "their interpretation of Latin culture is modern and sexy". Both Chaney and Lynch noted what she called "inexplicably high production values"; the fact that "these two looked great together", danced the merengue "beautifully" and "sounded smooth" drew a "B+" grade from her, while his "B" was given because "the dancing wowed but their voices just didn't connect for me on this empty club version".

The two songs performed by Will Schuester received the most negative reviews. Chaney described "La Cucaracha" as "mercifully brief", and Slezak gave it an "F" for being not only "intentionally awful" but "awful-awful". Chaney was more generously inclined toward "A Little Less Conversation". She wrote, "Matthew Morrison managed to give his all to this Spanish-infused Elvis Presley cover, even though he looked pretty ridiculous in that matador outfit", and gave it a "B". Futterman stated that the performance reached "a new low" with the appearance of "Mike and Brittany as his bulls", and Lynch said that the number "was supposed to suck" and "did its job well"; even so, he gave it a "C−". Slezak gave a one-word summation to accompany his "D" grade: "No."

=== Chart history ===
Two of the episode's five released singles debuted on the Billboard Hot 100: "Sexy and I Know It" debuted at number 83 and "La Isla Bonita" at number 99. The second of those songs, "La Isla Bonita", also debuted on the Billboard Canadian Hot 100 at number 93, and was the one song from the episode to appear on that chart.
