= Pot o' Gold (Glee) =

- Glee episode
- Episode no.: Season 3 Episode 4
- Directed by: Adam Shankman
- Written by: Ali Adler
- Production code: 3ARC04
- Original air date: November 1, 2011

Guest appearances
- Idina Menzel as Shelby Corcoran; Mike O'Malley as Burt Hummel; Iqbal Theba as Principal Figgins; Romy Rosemont as Carole Hudson-Hummel; Vanessa Lengies as Sugar Motta; Damian McGinty as Rory Flanagan; Bill A. Jones as Rod Remington; Earlene Davis as Andrea Carmichael

Episode chronology
← Previous "Asian F"	Next → "The First Time"
- Glee season 3

"Pot o' Gold" is the fourth episode of the third season of the American musical television series Glee, and the forty-eighth overall. It was written by Ali Adler, directed by Adam Shankman, and was first broadcast on Fox in the United States on November 1, 2011. The episode featured the arrival of Irish foreign exchange student Rory Flanagan (Glee Project prizewinner Damian McGinty) at McKinley High, a new challenger to Sue Sylvester (Jane Lynch) in her congressional race, Quinn Fabray (Dianna Agron) tries to make Shelby Corcoran (Idina Menzel) look like an unfit mother so she can get her birth daughter back, and the ongoing fragmentation of the show's central glee club, New Directions.

The episode as a whole received mixed reviews from reviewers. The storyline involving Quinn, Puck and Shelby was extensively criticized, while the injection of Burt Hummel (Mike O'Malley) into the congressional race as Sue's opponent was greeted with enthusiasm. The music was received with somewhat more favor than the episode itself, especially "Candyman", sung by the newly constituted Troubletones.

All five song covers performed in the episode were released as singles, available for download, and one of them, "Last Friday Night (T.G.I.F.)", charted on the Billboard Hot 100. Upon its initial airing, this episode was viewed by 7.47 million American viewers and earned a 3.0/8 Nielsen rating/share in the 18–49 demographic. The total viewership numbers and rating/share were down significantly from the previous episode, "Asian F", which had been broadcast four weeks earlier on October 4, 2011.

== Plot ==
Rory Flanagan (Damian McGinty), a foreign exchange student from Ireland, has begun attending McKinley High and is regularly being bullied. He is staying at Brittany's (Heather Morris) house; she believes that he is a leprechaun. Rory, who has a crush on Brittany, does not disabuse her of this belief because she has promised to let him into her "pot o' gold" if he grants her three wishes. He easily fulfills her first two wishes in mundane ways.

Mercedes (Amber Riley) is recruiting for the new all-girl show choir directed by Shelby Corcoran (Idina Menzel), and asks Santana (Naya Rivera)—a member of the school's existing glee club, New Directions—to join. Santana balks at leaving Brittany behind, and when she and Brittany go out on a dinner date, Santana tries to recruit her, but Brittany is unwilling to leave her New Directions friends. She tells Santana of Rory's supposed magical powers, and Santana later coerces Rory into telling Brittany that Santana has wished for her to join Shelby's glee club. Brittany believes she must obey that wish, but her third wish is that doing so does not hurt anybody's feelings. New Directions co-captain Finn Hudson (Cory Monteith) tries to persuade Brittany not to leave: he tells her that leprechauns are not real and that she is being stupid. Brittany, insulted, quits anyway.

Quinn (Dianna Agron) and Puck (Mark Salling) offer to babysit Beth, their biological daughter who they gave up to Shelby for adoption. While babysitting, Quinn hides hot sauce, sharp knives, books on child cannibalism and other items to make Shelby look like an unfit mother; she subsequently calls Child Protective Services, under the assumption that they will ultimately restore Beth to her after they investigate and find the evidence. Puck later returns to secretly gather up the items. He also sings "Waiting for a Girl Like You" to calm a crying Beth and to comfort Shelby, who confesses she is extremely lonely. In the episode's closing moments, Puck and Shelby kiss.

Congressional candidate and cheerleading coach Sue Sylvester (Jane Lynch)—whose campaign platform includes the elimination of funding for school arts programs—editorializes on television to rescind the budget of the school's production of West Side Story. She succeeds after an angry mother throws a brick at Principal Figgins (Iqbal Theba). Glee club director Will Schuester (Matthew Morrison) recruits the members to sell advertising space in the program book to raise money; when Kurt (Chris Colfer) asks his father Burt Hummel (Mike O'Malley) to purchase an ad, he instead gathers a group of businessmen to fund the musical. He then announces that he is running for congress against Sue.

At a meeting of Shelby's group, which is dubbed the Troubletones, a newly arrived Santana overawes Sugar Motta (Vanessa Lengies) into surrendering her central role. The Troubletones later give a dynamic performance of "Candyman", which is witnessed by a dismayed Finn and Will. Finn later apologizes to Brittany for his insensitive remarks and wishes her and the Troubletones the best, after which Rory claims that he has fulfilled Brittany's third wish. However, she chastises him, saying that Finn's feelings clearly were hurt by the defection and that she now knows leprechauns are not real. Later, when Rory is being harassed by bullies, Finn comes to his rescue and invites him to join New Directions; he successfully auditions with the song "Take Care of Yourself".

== Production ==
The episode was written by co-executive producer Ali Adler, making it the first episode not to be written by any of the co-creators of Glee—Ryan Murphy, Brad Falchuk and Ian Brennan—and it was the second to be directed by choreographer Adam Shankman, who helmed "The Rocky Horror Glee Show" in the second season. Shankman started working on the episode on September 2, 2011, and filming ended on September 22, 2011. This episode and the prior one were shot in parallel for several days until "Asian F" finished filming its musical finale on September 16, 2011.

McGinty, one of the two winners of The Glee Project's top prize of a seven-episode recurring character role on Glee, makes his first appearance in this episode as Rory Flanagan, an Irish exchange student. Murphy revealed that on McGinty's first day of filming "he was shoved into a locker 25 times", and that on "his first take in his first song, the crew gave him a huge ovation." Rory is living with Brittany's family, and the idea of McGinty's character interacting with Brittany was first broached in the penultimate episode of The Glee Project, with the judges speculating that Brittany would not be able to understand a word the character said due to his Irish accent.

Additional recurring guest stars appearing in this episode include Menzel as Shelby Corcoran, Principal Figgins (Iqbal Theba), Kurt's father Burt Hummel, Burt's wife and Finn's mother Carole Hudson-Hummel (Romy Rosemont), student Sugar Motta (Vanessa Lengies), and TV news co-anchors Rod Remington (Bill A. Jones) and Andrea Carmichael (Earlene Davis).

This episode features five covers, all of which were made available for download as digital singles: Christina Aguilera's "Candyman" performed by Rivera, Morris, and Riley, Katy Perry's "Last Friday Night (T.G.I.F.)" with Criss on lead vocals, Foreigner's "Waiting for a Girl Like You" performed by Salling, and "Bein' Green" from Sesame Street and Teddy Thompson's "Take Care of Yourself", both performed by McGinty.

== Reception ==
=== Ratings ===
"Pot o' Gold" was first broadcast on November 1, 2011, in the United States on Fox. It garnered a 3.0/8 Nielsen rating/share in the 18–49 demographic, and received 7.47 million American viewers during its initial airing. It continued the streak of coming in second in its timeslot to NCIS on CBS, which earned a 3.9/11 rating/share in the 18–49 demographic. It had been four weeks since the previous Glee episode was broadcast, and the show's viewership numbers were down over 11% from the 3.6/10 rating/share and 8.42 million viewers from the "Asian F" broadcast on October 4, 2011. "Pot o' Gold" tied for the second-lowest rating/share Glee had ever received in the 18–49 demographic—the fourth episode of the first season, "Preggers", also earned 3.0/8 rating/share, though it only had 6.62 million viewers. It was still ahead of the eleventh episode of the first season, "Hairography", which received a 2.5/7 rating/share in the 18–49 demographic and 6.08 million viewers when broadcast on November 25, 2009, the night before Thanksgiving.

Viewership also decreased in other countries. In the United Kingdom, "Pot o' Gold" was watched on Sky1 by 1.05 million viewers, down nearly 5% compared to "Asian F" four weeks earlier, when 1.10 million viewers were watching. In Australia, "Pot o' Gold" was watched by 724,000 viewers, which made Glee the fourteenth most-watched program of the night. The viewership was down 11% from "Asian F", which was watched by 843,000 viewers. It was the lowest number of viewers of the third season, just below the second episode, "I Am Unicorn", which drew 729,000 viewers. In Canada, 1.62 million viewers watched the episode, and it was the eighteenth most-viewed show of the week, down four slots and 11% from the 1.82 million viewers who watched "Asian F", though up 8% from the 1.50 million viewers who watched "I Am Unicorn".

=== Critical reception ===
"Pot o' Gold" received mixed reviews from critics, which ranged from reasonably positive to very negative. In the latter camp were Bobby Hankinson of The Houston Chronicle, who called it "a disaster", and Rolling Stone's Erica Futterman, who said it was "stale and unfunny" and "outright failed to keep up the momentum started by the season's first three episodes". Robert Canning of IGN took the opposite view from Futterman with regard to the show's progress: he gave it a "good" rating of 7.5 out of 10, and wrote that while it was not a "stunning return after four weeks off", it "kept the momentum and focus of the first few episodes of this season intact". The A.V. Club's Emily VanDerWerff characterized it as "an episode that tries a lot of things" but "produced too many duds", while Anthony Benigno of The Faster Times felt that the fact that it was the first episode not written by one of the show's co-creators meant it was "a lot more subtle" but "seemed a bit lifeless at times". AOLTV's Crystal Bell was "pleasantly surprised" and said the episode was "better than a majority" of those from the second season, and Abby West of Entertainment Weekly described it as a "pretty solid return" after the hiatus.

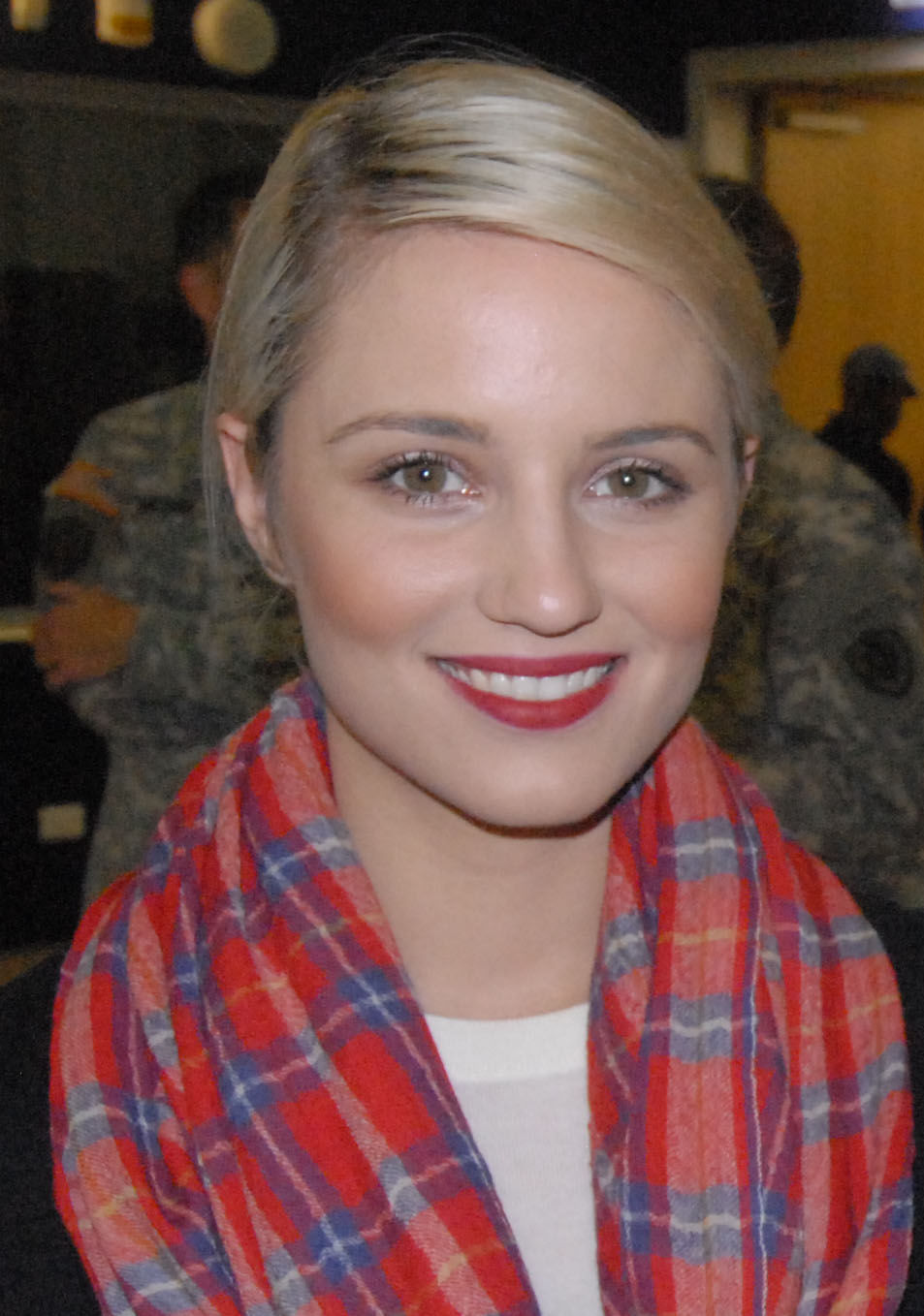
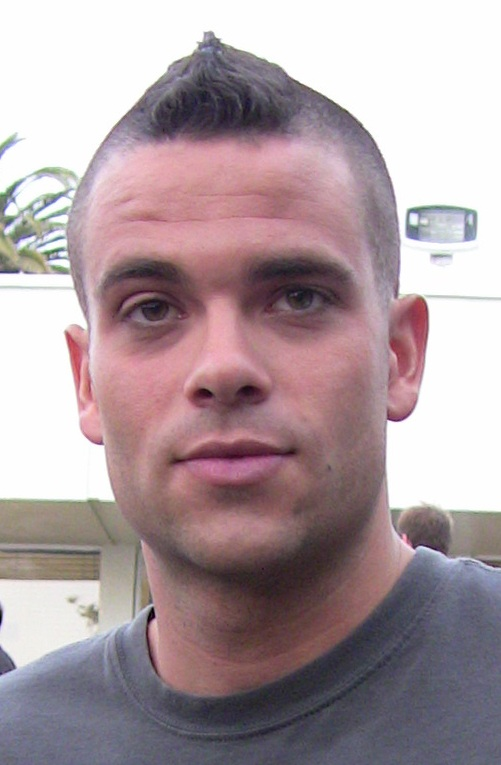
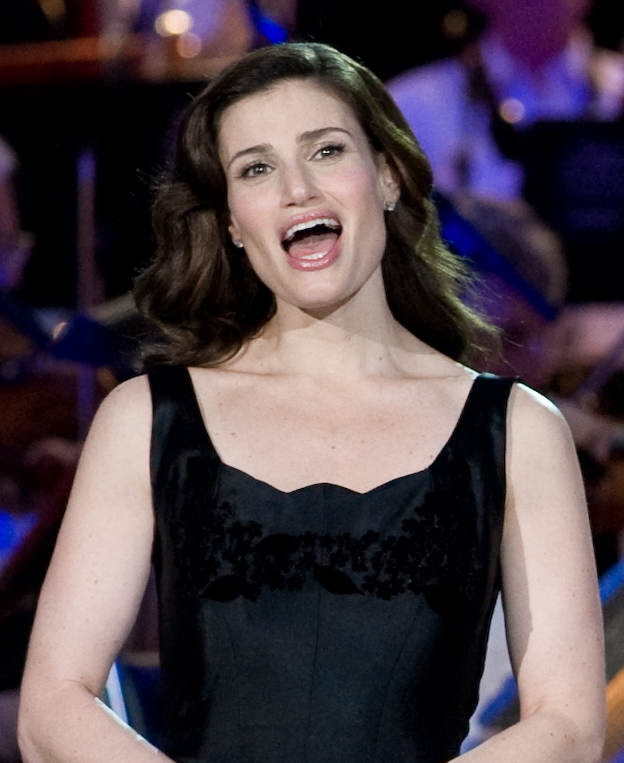
The storyline involving Quinn (Agron, left), Puck (Salling, center) and Shelby (Menzel, right) was strongly criticized by reviewers.

The entire storyline that centered around Quinn, Puck and Shelby was roundly criticized by reviewers. West wrote that it made her feel "queasy", and she called Quinn's actions "abhorrent". Bell was one of several who thought it was highly implausible that Child Protective Services would be backed up, much less for two weeks, given the gravity of Quinn's accusations. Hankinson wondered why they "made Quinn a total sociopath" who went from "dancing on desks" to "framing someone for child endangerment" with great ease; VanDerWerff was also critical of these actions, and called Quinn's sabotage of Shelby's apartment "a move that takes a potentially good character, played by a fine actress, and just guts her". Kevin P. Sullivan of MTV had a different view, and wrote that the "storyline stuck out throughout the episode as the most interesting". He also noted that it was "cathartic and definitely nice to see a sweeter Puck balance out the earnest craziness of Quinn". The final scene of the episode, when Puck kissed Shelby, was characterized as "creepy" and "super awkward" by Bell, as either "super creepy" or "romantic" by BuddyTV's John Kubicek, as "groan-inducing" in the "You're actually going to go there?" vein by Canning and "as realistic as Lord Tubbington pooping candy bars" by Michael Slezak of TVLine.

Sue's campaign for congress in the third season has not heretofore found much favor with reviewers, though Futterman felt that the addition of Burt Hummel as a rival candidate "gives us a sliver of hope, mainly because Mike O'Malley has managed to do no wrong thus far" as Burt, and VanDerWerff, while otherwise unimpressed, said he liked "the idea of the show pitting its most purely heroic figure against its most purely villainous". Bell was pleased with the new development, and noted that in three seasons, "no character has grown more than Burt". Canning said he loved having Burt as Sue's nemesis, and Kubicek wrote that the two are "awesome together".

Several reviewers felt that the introduction of Rory overdid his Irishness. Benigno called it "cheap stereotyping", and "juvenile" on the part of the writers. West, while she admitted that "it may have been a little heavy-handed" to have Rory in green, felt it "worked", especially for his opening solo and "his isolation" during it. Jen Chaney of The Washington Post characterized the tweaking of that solo to be about "Irish exchange students being bullied" as "forced", and VanDerWerff wrote that he was tired of "people just randomly getting shoved around for no real reason". Benigno noted that Sugar was also being bullied—by Santana—and wrote that he was "not a fan" of this "on a show that supposedly glorifies outcasts and promotes their successes". Santana came in for praise from Kubicek, along with Brittany, for their "fantastic date" and their relationship which is "the most interesting one on the show". The new show choir they join, the Troubletones, was acclaimed by Bell: "I'm really loving Shelby's diva troupe."

The Hollywood Reporter's Lesley Goldberg called the use of Katy Perry's "Last Friday Night (T.G.I.F.)" in the episode "completely out of place", and Sullivan characterized its inclusion as "barely justified". Raymund Flandez of The Wall Street Journal pointed out that both Criss and McHale had major roles in Perry's video of the song, and the Glee performance "winks at [that] fact". West was annoyed by Finn's recent tendency to "succumb" to his less nice and less responsible side as exemplified in the episode by his failure to "stand up for Rory" and for blasting "Brittany's simple, goofy belief system", even if he does eventually do the right thing.

=== Music and performances ===
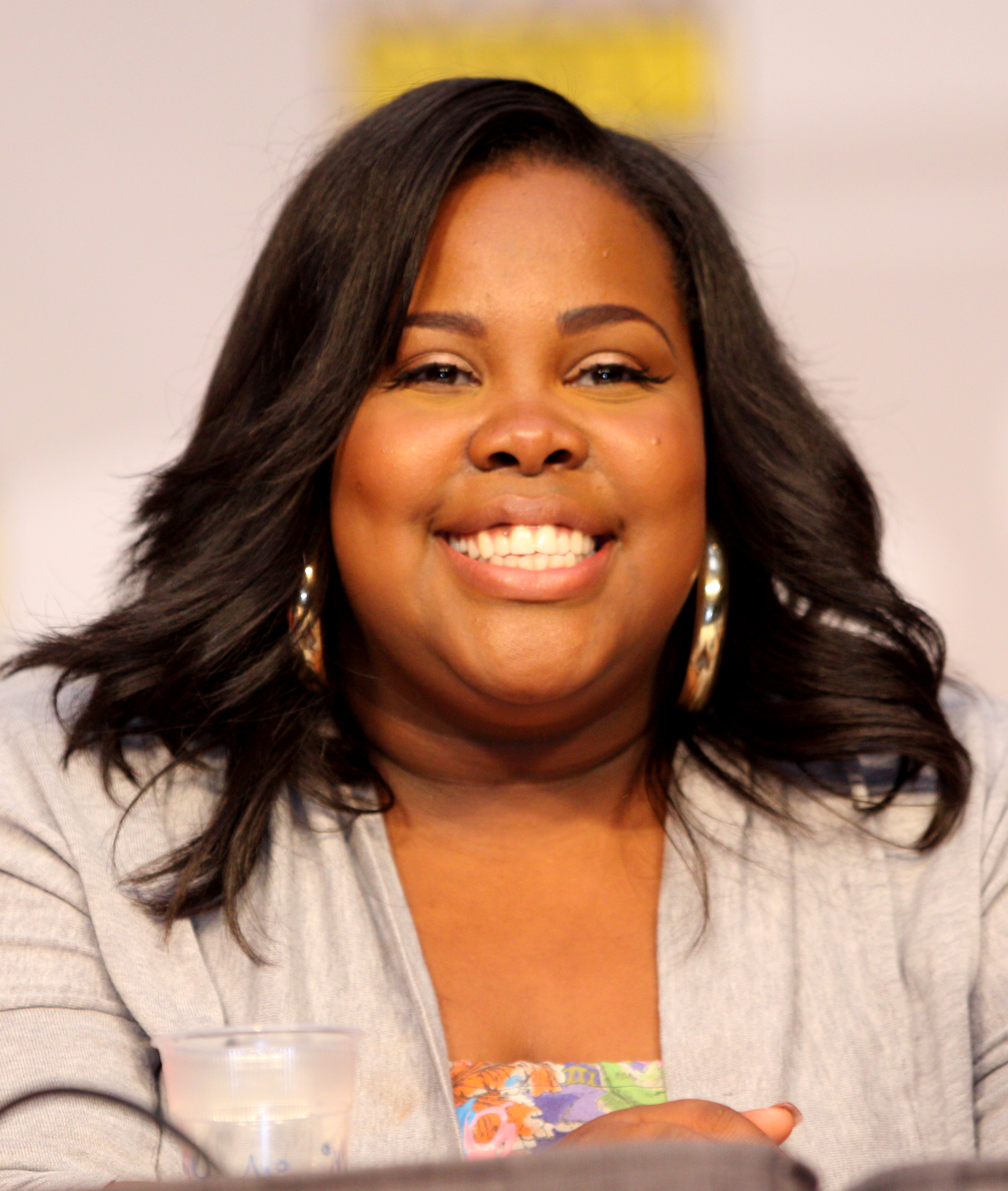
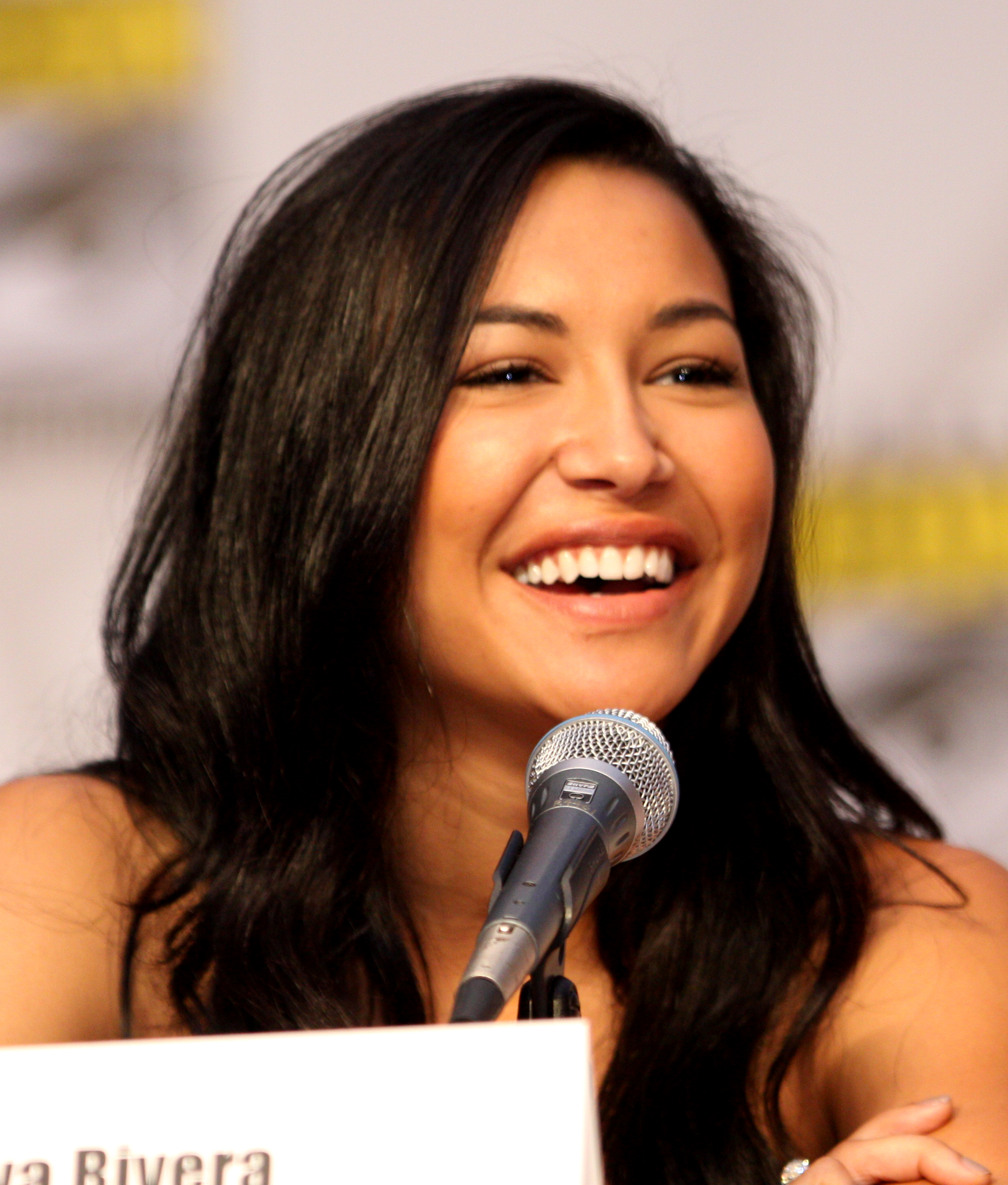
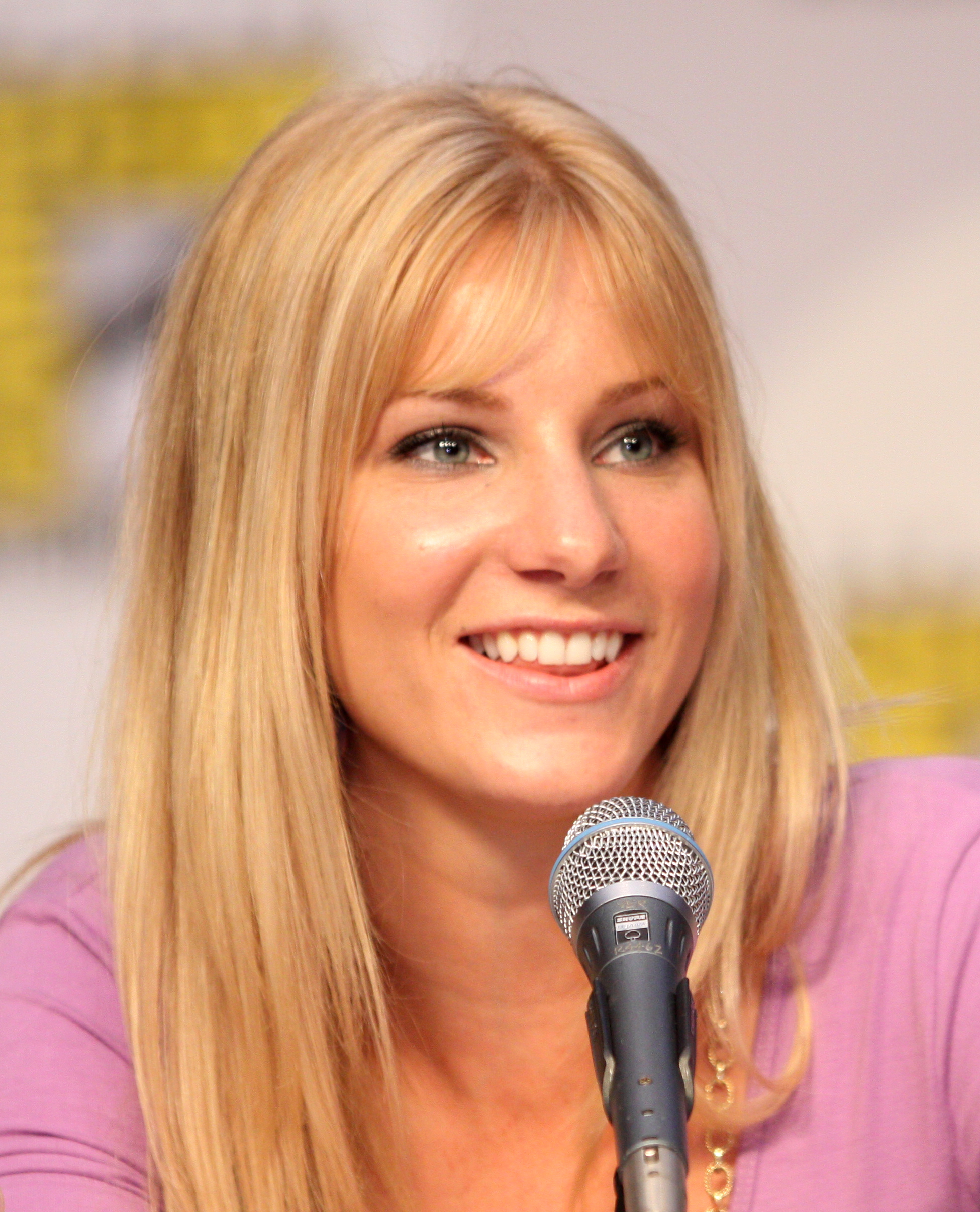
The Troubletones performance of "Candyman"—led by Mercedes (Riley, left), Santana (Rivera, center) and Brittany (Morris, right)—was the favorite of many reviewers.

The musical performances in this episode were received with a bit more enthusiasm than the episode itself. Benigno described them as "decent songs", but though Canning wrote that "Candyman" was "fun", he also said that the "rest of the music" prevented the episode "from being much better". Indeed, "Candyman" was a favorite of many reviewers: The Star-Ledger's Vicki Hyman called it "bouncy and fun", Futterman praised the "tight harmonies" and the "diva notes from Mercedes and Santana", and Slezak gave the number an "A" and said he loved the Troubletones "absolutely soaring" in their performance. Hankinson, Hyman, and Chaney singled out the production values of the number—Hyman to call them "amazing"; Chaney to note, as she gave the song an "A−", that the costuming cost for the number would have rivaled the $2,004 budget of West Side Story that had Sue so upset; and Hankinson, although he said it would have been his favorite in a "blind test", to call it "a classic example of the kind of inexplicably elaborate performance I hate the most on this show".

Most of the reviewers had positive things to say about new character Rory Flanagan's singing voice, including Futterman, who said his was "quite lovely" and had "rich tones", and Rae Votta of Billboard, who called him a "smooth crooner". Hankinson, however, said he had never been "floored" by McGinty's voice, "so both of his numbers fell extremely flat to me", and Futterman maintained that both songs were a "weird fit" for the episode, while Votta thought having him perform two solos was "overkill on his character introduction". In general, "Bein' Green" was considered less impressive than "Take Care of Yourself", though it had its supporters: Votta and Bell both referred to it as "a nice introduction", and West declared that his "simple, clear-voiced ode to being an outsider rang true and was hauntingly beautiful", and gave it an "A−". Canning was not impressed: "Perhaps if it had been sung with more feeling, it could have worked better." For "Take Care of Yourself", both West and Goldberg agreed with Rachel's assessment that the performance was "magical", and West graded it with an "A+". The Los Angeles Times's Amy Reiter was "blown away", and Chaney gave it an "A" with the comment that Rory "handled it with adorable aplomb". Slezak and VanDerWerff, however, thought the number was somewhat sleep-inducing.

Puck's rendition of "Waiting for a Girl Like You" was almost universally described as "sweet". Flandez went further, and wrote "he oozes sweet and sexy, and you can't help but feel good", and Goldberg still further when she stated that it "ends up being one of the episode's—and season's—sweetest moments thus far". West praised the "lovely little guitar solo" and gave the song a "B"; Chaney bestowed the same grade and called it a "cheesy moment" but a "nice job" by Salling. Futterman commented that Puck got to "showcase his nice falsetto".

"Last Friday Night" evoked a wide range of opinions from reviewers. Chaney wrote that the performance "incorporated several Glee tropes" and was a routine seen before; she gave it a "B−". Futterman characterized the choreography as "full of forced sunshine" and said "Blaine's normally effortless voice sounds breathy". West noted that the song "wasn't the best showcase for his voice" but added that "it was exactly the playful little interlude it needed to be", and gave it a "B+". Goldberg called it "fantastic", and Kubicek said "it's hard not to love his singing". Slezak stated that "Darren Criss is better than this song", and gave it a "D". Votta pointed out that the song was "one of the first truly current pop hits on Glee this season", described the performance as "pure Glee" and the dancing "disorganized and joyful", and the whole number as why the show "connects with the youth of America".

=== Chart history ===
One of the five cover versions released as singles debuted on the Billboard Hot 100: "Last Friday Night (T.G.I.F.)" debuted at number 72. "Last Friday Night (T.G.I.F.)" also debuted on the Billboard Canadian Hot 100 chart, at number 86. In addition, it is the one single from the episode to be included on the soundtrack album Glee: The Music, Volume 7. An additional song from the episode, "Take Care of Yourself", was included as one of the five bonus tracks available on the Target edition of the album.
