= Glee: The 3D Concert Movie (Motion Picture Soundtrack) =

Soundtrack album by Glee Cast
- Released: August 9, 2011
- Genre: Pop
- Length: 66:27
- Labels: Columbia Records; Fox Music

Glee Cast chronology
Glee: The Music, Volume 6 (2011)	Glee: The 3D Concert Movie (Motion Picture Soundtrack) (2011)	Glee: The Music, The Christmas Album Volume 2 (2011)

Glee: The 3D Concert Movie (Motion Picture Soundtrack) is the soundtrack to the film of the same name, based on the Fox television series Glee. It was released on August 9, 2011, by Columbia Records and Fox Music and featured the tracks performed on the 2011 Glee Live! In Concert! tour with the Glee Cast concert performing the songs live in East Rutherford, New Jersey. The album debuted at number 15 on Billboard 200.

== Background ==
Glee: The 3D Concert Movie is the concert documentary film that depicted the Glee Cast concert in East Rutherford, New Jersey during the group's Glee Live! In Concert! tour held during June 16 and 17, 2011. It featured behind-the-scenes footage, and a setlist of songs from the show's first and second seasons. Apart from the cast members, it also featured Gwyneth Paltrow as Holly Holliday as a special guest (uncredited, though she was given credit for the song "Forget You").

== Reception ==
Professional ratings
Review scores
Source	Rating
AllMusic	3.5/5 stars

Andrew Leahey of AllMusic wrote that "it features 23 songs, including most of the show’s biggest hits. It spotlights the entire cast, from heavy hitters to newcomers to tangential characters. And above all else, it sounds perfect; every note is hit, every harmony flawlessly sung, every a cappella section meticulously executed." He felt that the auto-tuning was the biggest problem with Glee's regular soundtracks, but criticised the lip syncing as it was "impossible to tell which parts are performed and which are piped in". He concluded the review, writing "If you aren’t a fan of Glee’s cheesy, “follow your dreams!!" gusto, then you have no business listening to The 3D Concert Movie, which often feels like the stage adaptation of an afternoon special. If you’re a Gleek, though, you probably realize the best way to enjoy any Glee album—or any episode, for that matter—is to suspend your disbelief and simply enjoy these sugary pop songs, whether they’re the product of a single performance in East Rutherford, New Jersey (the setting for this soundtrack and its accompanying film) or a hybrid of live vocals, studio overdubs, and canned harmonies."

Stephen Holden of The New York Times wrote "The movie’s roughly 20 songs are a pleasant whoosh of beat-driven production numbers acrobatically choreographed by Zach Woodlee and musically supervised by P. J. Bloom. The elaborate arrangements mash musical genres into a slick pastiche performed by singers whose vocal quirks have been meticulously ironed out."

== Track listing ==
The album featured all the tracks performed by the cast members in the concert, except for "Empire State of Mind". The cover of "Dog Days Are Over" was not included in the film (except in the home media release) but was featured in the soundtrack as a bonus album.

No.	Title	Writer(s)	Version covered	Length
1.	"Don't Stop Believin'" (Lea Michele, Cory Monteith and the Glee cast)	Jonathan Cain; Steve Perry; Neal Schon	Journey	4:00
2.	"Dog Days Are Over (Bonus Track)" (Jenna Ushkowitz, Amber Riley and the Glee cast)	Florence Welch; Isabella Summers	Florence and the Machine	2:58
3.	"Sing" (Lea Michele, Cory Monteith and the Glee cast)	My Chemical Romance	My Chemical Romance	2:40
4.	"I'm a Slave 4 U" (Heather Morris)	Pharrell Williams; Chad Hugo	Britney Spears	3:23
5.	"Fat Bottomed Girls" (Mark Salling)	Brian May	Queen	2:20
6.	"I Want to Hold Your Hand" (Chris Colfer)	John Lennon; Paul McCartney	T.V. Carpio's version from the 2007 film Across the Universe	3:08
7.	"Ain't No Way" (Amber Riley)	Carolyn Franklin	Aretha Franklin	3:08
8.	"P.Y.T. (Pretty Young Thing)" (Harry Shum Jr. and Kevin McHale)	James Ingram; Quincy Jones	Michael Jackson	2:42
9.	"Born This Way" (Chris Colfer, Jenna Ushkowitz, Amber Riley and the Glee cast)	Lady Gaga; Jeppe Laursen; DJ White Shadow; Fernando Garibay	Lady Gaga	3:59
10.	"Firework" (Lea Michele)	Katy Perry; Stargate; Ester Dean; Sandy Wilheim	Katy Perry	2:44
11.	"Teenage Dream" (The Warblers)	Katy Perry; Lukasz Gottwald; Max Martin; Benjamin Levin; Bonnie McKee	Katy Perry	2:30
12.	"Silly Love Songs" (The Warblers)	Paul McCartney; Linda McCartney	Paul McCartney & Wings	2:33
13.	"Raise Your Glass" (The Warblers)	Pink; Max Martin; Shellback	Pink	2:25
14.	"Happy Days Are Here Again / Get Happy" (Lea Michele and Chris Colfer)	Jack Yellen; Ted Koehler	Barbra Streisand; Judy Garland	2:51
15.	"Lucky" (Dianna Agron and Chord Overstreet)	Jason Mraz; Colbie Caillat; Timothy Fagan	Jason Mraz; Colbie Caillat	2:09
16.	"River Deep – Mountain High" (Amber Riley and Naya Rivera)	Ellie Greenwich; Phil Spector	Ike & Tina Turner	2:40
17.	"Forget You" (Gwyneth Paltrow, Amber Riley, Kevin McHale, Naya Rivera and the Glee cast)	Cee Lo Green; Bruno Mars; The Smeezingtons; Brody Brown	Cee Lo Green	2:42
18.	"Don't Rain on My Parade" (Lea Michele)	Bob Merrill	Barbra Streisand	2:42
19.	"Jessie's Girl" (Cory Monteith)	Rick Springfield	Rick Springfield	1:59
20.	"Valerie" (Naya Rivera)	Dave McCabe; The Zutons	Mark Ronson; Amy Winehouse	2:06
21.	"Loser like Me" (Lea Michele and Cory Monteith)	Adam Anders; Peer Åström; Savan Kotecha; Max Martin; Johan Schuster	Glee Cast	3:45
22.	"The Safety Dance" (Kevin McHale)	Ivan Doroschuk	Men Without Hats	2:34
23.	"Somebody to Love" (Lea Michele, Cory Monteith, Amber Riley and the Glee cast)	Freddie Mercury	Queen	4:14
Total length:				66:27

== Personnel ==
- Dianna Agron – primary artist, vocals
- Zachary Alford – drums
- Adam Anders – producer, soundtrack producer
- Alex Anders – digital editing
- Harold Arlen – composer
- Peer Åström – mixing, producer
- Dave Barrera – bass technician, guitar technician
- Heather Beson – assistant
- PJ Bloom – music supervisor
- C. Brown – composer
- Geoff Bywater – executive in charge of music
- Colbie Caillat – composer
- Thomas Callaway – composer
- Charles Campbell – assistant
- B. Chowdhury – composer
- Chris Colfer – primary artist, vocals
- Darren Criss – primary artist, vocals
- Dante Di Loreto – soundtrack executive producer
- Robert Dorion – keyboard technician
- Mikkel Storleer Eriksen – composer
- Scott Evans – audio technician
- Brad Falchuk – soundtrack executive producer
- Carolyn Franklin – composer
- F. Garibay – composer
- Glee – primary artist
- James Goldsmith – assistant
- Lukasz Gottwald – composer
- Ellie Greenwich – composer
- Heather Guibert – coordination
- Jerry Harvey – monitor engineer
- Tor Erik Hermansen – composer
- Dan Horton – monitor engineer
- J. Ingram – composer
- Quincy Jones – composer
- P. Lawrence – composer
- John Lennon – composer
- Benjamin Levin – composer
- A. Levine – composer
- Meaghan Lyons – coordination
- Dominick Maita – mastering
- Max Martin – composer
- D. McCabe – composer
- Paul McCartney – composer
- Kevin McHale – primary artist, vocals
- Bonnie McKee – composer
- Gabriel McNair – guitar, keyboards
- Freddie Mercury – composer
- Lea Michele – primary artist, vocals
- Cory Monteith – primary artist, vocals
- Heather Morris – primary artist, vocals
- Ryan Murphy – producer, soundtrack producer
- My Chemical Romance – composer
- Steve Nebehay – drum technician
- Chord Overstreet – primary artist, vocals
- Gwyneth Paltrow – featured artist, vocals
- S. Payne – composer
- Katy Perry – composer
- Steve Perry – composer
- Ginger Pooley – bass, keyboards
- Kristopher Pooley – keyboards, live production
- Nicole Ray – production coordination
- Amber Riley – primary artist, vocals
- Naya Rivera – primary artist, vocals
- Mark Salling – primary artist, vocals
- Neal Schon – composer
- Shellback – composer
- Jenny Sinclair – coordination
- Joel Singer – engineer
- Phil Spector – composer
- Rick Springfield – composer
- Jule Styne – composer
- Bernard Gregory Suran Jr. – guitar
- Jenna Ushkowitz – primary artist, vocals
- Jay Vicari – engineer
- P. Williams – composer
- Ray Woodbury – creative design

Source: Allmusic

== Chart performance ==
Chart (2011)	Peak position
Australian Albums (ARIA)	12
Canadian Albums (Billboard)	10
Irish Albums (IRMA)	21
Mexican Albums (AMPROFON)	38
Dutch Albums (Album Top 100)	98
New Zealand Albums (RMNZ)	15
UK Albums (Official Charts)	35
UK Soundtrack Albums (Official Charts)	1
US Billboard 200	16
US Soundtrack Albums (Billboard)	2

== Release history ==
List of release dates, showing country and formats released
Country	Release date	Format(s)
Canada	August 9, 2011	CD, digital download
United States	August 9, 2011	CD, digital download
Australia	August 13, 2011	Digital download
Ireland	August 17, 2011	Digital download
New Zealand	August 22, 2011	Digital download
United Kingdom	August 28, 2011	Digital download
