= A Piece of What You Need =

Studio album by Teddy Thompson
- Released: 17 June 2008
- Genre: Folk, alternative country
- Label: Verve Forecast
- Producer: Marius de Vries

Teddy Thompson chronology
Upfront & Down Low (2007)	A Piece of What You Need (2008)	Bella (2011)

Professional ratings
Aggregate scores
Source	Rating
Metacritic	84/100
Review scores
Source	Rating
AllMusic	4/5 stars
The Guardian	4/5 stars
Mojo	4/5 stars
musicOMH	4/5 stars
PopMatters	8/10
Q	4/5 stars
Tom Hull	B+
Uncut	4/5 stars

A Piece of What You Need is the fourth studio album by singer-songwriter Teddy Thompson. The album contains all new Teddy originals and was produced by Marius De Vries, whom Teddy met while recording background vocals on Rufus Wainwright's Want records in 2002. Included are new songs Teddy had been testing out live, such as "Turning the Gun On Myself", "In My Arms" and "Can't Sing Straight".

The album debuted on the UK Albums Chart at No. 10. The first single from A Piece of What You Need is "In My Arms". The music video features a cameo appearance by Rufus Wainwright dressed up as Elvis Presley. The song entered the UK Singles Chart at No. 107.

The song "Turning the Gun on Myself" contains a slowed down gunshot adding a percussion-effect along with the drums on the track.

== Track listing ==
1. "The Things I Do"
2. "What's This?!!"
3. "In My Arms"
4. "Where to Go From Here"
5. "Don't Know What I Was Thinking"
6. "Can't Sing Straight"
7. "Slippery Slope"
8. "Jonathan's Book"
9. "One of These Days"
10. "Turning the Gun on Myself"
11. "A Piece of What You Need"

– Hidden Track (starts at 14:55): "The Price of Love" (The Everly Brothers) with Ed Harcourt

iTunes Bonus Track: "Long Life"

Bonus track on some editions: "Christmas" with Richard, Linda and Kami Thompson
