= Rory Flanagan =

Fictional character from the Fox series Glee

- Glee character
- Damian McGinty as Rory Flanagan
- First appearance: "Pot o' Gold" (2011)
- Last appearance: "Glee, Actually" (2012) "We Built This Glee Club" (flashback; 2015)
- Created by: Ryan Murphy; Brad Falchuk; Ian Brennan
- Portrayed by: Damian McGinty

In-universe information
- Occupation: Frisbee Legend
- Family: Seamus Flanagan (brother)
- Religion: Roman Catholic
- Nationality: Irish

Rory Flanagan is a recurring fictional character from the Fox musical comedy-drama series Glee. The character is portrayed by actor Damian McGinty, and appeared in Glee starting with its third season episode "Pot o' Gold", first broadcast on November 1, 2011. Rory is an exchange student from Ireland who arrives as a sophomore, and is living at the home of Brittany Pierce (Heather Morris) while studying at McKinley High. He joins the McKinley glee club, New Directions, in his first episode. The character was created after McGinty was one of two winners of a seven-episode arc in Glee's third season after having successfully competed in the reality television show The Glee Project. As Rory, McGinty sang four solo covers on the show, and appeared in many group performances. Rory continued as a recurring character beyond the initial seven episode prize, through the end of the third season. He made one more appearance after that, in the fourth season. McGinty was invited back for the series finale, but could not take part due to scheduling commitments with the world tour for Irish singing group Celtic Thunder.

== Storylines ==
Rory, a foreign exchange student from Ireland, has begun attending McKinley High as a sophomore and is regularly being bullied. He is staying at Brittany's (Heather Morris) house; she believes that he is a leprechaun. Rory, who has a crush on Brittany, does not disabuse her of this belief because she has promised to let him into her "pot o' gold" if he grants her three wishes. He easily fulfills her first two wishes in mundane ways, but fails at the third when Brittany quits New Directions to join the Troubletones, but her wish that New Directions co-captain Finn Hudson (Cory Monteith) not be hurt by the defection does not come true. Finn later rescues Rory from some bullies, and Rory apologizes for his part in Brittany's departure. Finn invites him to try out for New Directions, and he successfully auditions with the song "Take Care of Yourself". He later takes part in the Sectionals show choir competition with New Directions, and they defeat the Troubletones. Newly returned glee club member Sam Evans (Chord Overstreet) offers to take Rory home with him for the holidays to show him a true American Christmas, since Brittany's family has to go out of town; he inspires Rory, who is cast as Itchy the Holiday Elf in the glee club's PBS special, to read a more meaningful holiday text as part of his on-air role, and the pair man a charitable donations holiday kettle to help raise money for people in need. Rory and Artie (Kevin McHale) compete to be Sugar Motta's (Vanessa Lengies) date at her Valentine's Day party in the episode "Heart". She chooses Rory after he announces to the glee club that his request for a visa to attend McKinley again next year has been denied and sings "Home". He appeared in every episode for the rest of the season, performing in Regionals and Nationals, winning both competitions before witnessing New Directions' seniors graduate. He had already left McKinley (and probably America) at the beginning of the fourth season, though no explanation is ever officially given. He last appeared in the series as Artie's guardian angel in his dream sequence during the Christmas episode "Glee, Actually", and briefly cameoed in "City of Angels" (from season five) and lastly in "We Built This Glee Club" (from season six) in flashbacks.

== Development ==
McGinty was one of two winners of the reality television competition The Glee Project in 2011, which earned him a seven-episode arc on Glee. The idea of having McGinty's character interact with Brittany was first broached in the penultimate episode of The Glee Project, with the judges speculating that Brittany would not be able to understand a word the character said due to his Irish accent.

Rory has a thick Irish accent. He is frequently seen wearing green, although later in the series he usually wears red. He had a crush on Brittany, idolizes Finn, and loves American music. He is socially awkward and has a hard time relating to people. He couldn't think of a good insult when he was fighting with Santana and doesn't understand American slang. This could be culture shock, but it is implied he was socially awkward before arriving in America. Although he seems nice at first, Rory will sometimes lie to get what he wants. He is in a relationship with Sugar Motta.

The character has appeared on Glee past the initial seven episodes guaranteed by McGinty's prize, although in an interview in July 2012, series co-creator Brad Falchuk said in an interview that McGinty would not be appearing in at least the first half of Season 4.

== Musical performances ==
In his debut episode, "Pot o' Gold", Rory performed "Bein' Green" from Sesame Street and Teddy Thompson's "Take Care of Yourself". Most of the reviewers had positive things to say about his singing voice, including Rolling Stone's Erica Futterman, who said his was "quite lovely" and had "rich tones", and Rae Votta of Billboard, who called him a "smooth crooner". Bobby Hankinson of The Houston Chronicle, however, said he had never been "floored" by McGinty's voice, "so both of his numbers fell extremely flat to me", and Votta thought having him perform two solos was "overkill on his character introduction". In general, "Bein' Green" was considered less impressive than "Take Care of Yourself", though it had its supporters: Votta and AOLTV's Crystal Bell both referred to it as "a nice introduction", and Abby West of Entertainment Weekly declared that his "simple, clear-voiced ode to being an outsider rang true and was hauntingly beautiful", and gave it an "A−". Robert Canning of IGN was not impressed: "Perhaps if it had been sung with more feeling, it could have worked better." For "Take Care of Yourself", both West and The Hollywood Reporter's Lesley Goldberg agreed with Rachel's assessment that the performance was "magical", and West graded it with an "A+". The Los Angeles Times's Amy Reiter was "blown away", and Jen Chaney of The Washington Post gave it an "A" with the comment that Rory "handled it with adorable aplomb". Michael Slezak of TVLine and The A.V. Club's Emily VanDerWerff, however, thought the number was somewhat sleep-inducing.

Since his first episode, Rory has had few solo opportunities. In the season's sixth episode, "Mash Off", he had a single-verse duet with Tina on Hall & Oates mash-up of "I Can't Go for That" and "You Make My Dreams". In the "Extraordinary Merry Christmas" episode, he performed "Blue Christmas", which had already been featured on the holiday compilation soundtrack Glee: The Music, The Christmas Album Volume 2 released four weeks previously. West wrote that "Rory's crooning take" of "Blue Christmas" was "smooth and lovely", and gave it a "B+", and Raymund Flandez of The Wall Street Journal agreed with the in-show assessment that it was "mournfully beautiful". Futterman said that the song "perfectly suits his vocals", but was unimpressed with Rory "standing awkwardly" through the song; Slezak noted the static staging and filming of the number and gave it a "C", and while Chaney said he sang it "just fine", she also said he "didn't sell it", and gave it a "C+". Futterman, Slezak and Chaney had similar reactions to his next solo, Michael Bublé's "Home", in the Valentine's Day episode "Heart".

== Reception ==
Much of the initial reaction to the character of Rory centered on the show's portrayal of his Irishness, rather than on McGinty himself. Anthony Benigno of The Faster Times called it "cheap stereotyping", and "juvenile" on the part of the show's writers, and Chaney characterized the tweaking of his opening solo to be about "Irish exchange students being bullied" as "forced". West, while she admitted that "it may have been a little heavy-handed" to have Rory in green, felt it "worked", especially for that solo and "his isolation" during it. IrishCentral's Patrick Roberts called the episode a "disgrace". He thought the character's representation was "downright insulting" to Irish Americans and wrote that executive producer Murphy, given his Irish heritage, "should be ashamed of himself".

A few reviewers were pleased by the new friendship between Rory and Sam in "Extraordinary Merry Christmas". BuddyTV's John Kubicek declared that it was his "favorite thing from the entire third season of Glee", and Bell approved, though she said "the writers don't know how to use" Rory, and was disappointed that his brotherly relationship with Finn had "fizzled". VanDerWerff wrote that "the show will just pick whichever characterization of Rory is most convenient for the episode in question", which made it "hard to care all that much about how he's alone for Christmas or how he's building a friendship with Sam".
