= Damian McGinty =

- Born: Damian Joseph McGinty; 9 September 1992 (age 34); Derry, Northern Ireland
- Occupations: Singer; actor
- Years active: 2006–present
- Formerly of: Celtic Thunder
- Website: www.damianmcginty.com

Damian Joseph McGinty (born 9 September 1992) is an Irish singer and actor. McGinty has been performing for over a decade, and was a member of the group Celtic Thunder for thirteen years, starting when he was fourteen. On 21 August 2011, McGinty won the Oxygen reality show The Glee Project, earning him a seven-episode guest-starring role on the hit Fox television show Glee which was later extended to 18 episodes.

== Early life ==
McGinty was born into a Catholic family in Derry, Northern Ireland.

== Career ==
=== Celtic Thunder ===
McGinty joined the newly formed Celtic Thunder in 2008 as a boy soprano at 14, and as he aged, developed a rich baritone, while still singing tenor and able to hit the high notes. During the four years he was a member, the group did four tours of the US and Canada, six PBS TV specials, performed at the White House and sold over a million recordings, with McGinty on nine of the concert CDs and DVDs. For three of his four years, Celtic Thunder was named Top World Album by Billboard magazine. McGinty returned as a special guest for the "Very Best of Celtic Thunder Tour" in 2015, and again for the "Legacy" touring cycle in 2016 following the departures of Colm Keegan and Emmett O’Hanlon. By 2017, he was again listed as part of the group's official line-up.

=== The Glee Project ===
In 2011, McGinty was selected as one of the top twelve finalists, out of 40,000 contenders, in a Myspace audition search, to be on the Oxygen reality show, The Glee Project. The O visa arrived at the last moment, allowing him to compete. He became very popular with viewers due to his humor, talent and hard work. Although his friend Cameron Mitchell, who quit (possibly saving McGinty who was in the bottom three that episode), won the Bing Fan Favorite, they sang Michael Bublé's "Haven't Met You Yet" together for the Bing video. McGinty's rendition of "Beyond the Sea" impressed the judges, who selected him as co-winner along with Samuel Larsen for a seven episode arc on the third season of the Fox series Glee.

=== Glee ===
In the third season of Glee, McGinty played Rory Flanagan, a foreign exchange student staying with Brittany S. Pierce's family and befriended by Finn Hudson. In his premiere, the season's fourth episode "Pot o' Gold", McGinty performed two solos: Teddy Thompson's "Take Care of Yourself", which showcased his "beautiful range", and Kermit the Frog's "Bein' Green", his "simple, clear-voiced ode to being an outsider rang true and was hauntingly beautiful." His initial seven episodes were extended to the end of the third season and he returned for the fourth season Christmas episode, for a total of 18. His "smooth and lovely" rendition of "Blue Christmas" was featured on Glee: The Music, The Christmas Album Volume 2, as well as "Home" as a solo, as well as part of numerous group and duet songs. McGinty appeared in a humorous sketch about his Irish accent on a MTV "Glee-Cap".

McGinty has almost half a million fans on X (formerly Twitter).

=== Dancing with the Stars ===
McGinty competed on the sixth series of the Irish version of Dancing with the Stars in 2023, partnered with Kylee Vincent. They reached the final, which was won by Carl Mullan and Emily Barker.

=== Performances ===
==== Let the River Run ====
McGinty and Máiréad Carlin sang the Derry City of Culture anthem "Let the River Run" at the BBC TV Gala Concert Sons and Daughters. Carly Simon, who felt their rendition of her song was "absolutely stunningly wonderful," released it as a single by her Iris Records and McGinty's Walled City Records company in 2014. She also performed her song with them during the multi-star Oceana Partners Awards Gala in Beverly Hills, California.

==== TV specials ====
Between 2008 and 2011, prior to his time on Glee, McGinty was in five PBS specials as a member of Celtic Thunder: The Show, It’s Entertainment, Christmas, Heritage and Storm. In 2013, McGinty appeared in two PBS specials. He joined former Celtic Thunder member Paul Byrom on his This Is the Moment show, and later they did a short tour. The other special The Power of Music with Ethan Bortnick was also a 2014 US tour.

==== Public performances ====
McGinty gave a "stunning performance" of the national anthem before the Kansas City Royals vs. Cincinnati Reds baseball game on 19 May 2015. He also has done all sized venues as a solo artist and is currently performing shows.

=== Recordings ===
His first EP ("Run," "This Is Your Song", "With or Without You", "Yellow" and "That's What Friends Are For") was released in December 2012 and at one point was No. 3 on the iTunes chart for US, and No. 1 in Ireland, Mexico and Peru. Various reviewers made note of his "smooth crooner voice", "rich tones" and his "golden pipes." Recently, he has been writing songs for his first album.

=== Charities ===
McGinty has lent his support to various charities including Concern Worldwide in a public service video on the need to get the children back to school in Haiti following the earthquake, The Trevor Project, Kids Beating Cancer, Oceana, and local charities.

=== Those Were The Days - The Tour ===
The band performed a US tour between 14 October and 21 November 21, 2021.

=== Cultural Ambassador ===
McGinty served as "Cultural Champion" for Derry, Northern Ireland, when the city was named the UK City of Culture 2013.

=== Walled City Records & Audio Booth ===
McGinty and his childhood friend Oran O’Carroll co-own the music companies Walled City Records and Audio Booth recording company.

== Personal life ==
McGinty announced his engagement to Anna Claire Sneed, on 3 June 2018, via Instagram post. The pair had been dating since April 2014. On 1 June 2019, McGinty and Sneed got married in Memphis, Tennessee.

On October 9th 2026, McGinty revealed that he had been groped by a fan at a Meet and Greet after his show.

== Filmography ==
Television
Year	Title	Role	Notes
2008	Celtic Thunder: The Show	Himself	PBS Special; filmed August 2007, released 18 March 2008
2010	Celtic Thunder: It's Entertainment	Himself	PBS Special; filmed 1–2 October 2009, released 9 February 2010
2010	Celtic Thunder: Christmas	Himself	PBS Special; filmed 17 September 2010, released 12 October 2010
2011	Celtic Thunder: Heritage	Himself	PBS Special; filmed 17 September 2010, released 22 February 2011
2011	Celtic Thunder: Storm	Himself	PBS Special; filmed 1–2 October 2009, released 20 September 2011
2011–2012	The Glee Project	Himself	Winner; Special Appearance on Season 2 (11 episodes)
2011–2012	Glee	Rory Flanagan	Recurring role (18 episodes: 17 in Season 3, 1 in Season 4)
2023	Dancing with the Stars	Himself	Contestant (series 6)

Film
Year	Title	Role	Notes
2018	Santa Fake	Pat Keeley (Lead Role)	23 November 2018

== Discography ==
=== Albums ===
- 2016: This Christmas Time
- 2019: Young Forever
- 2022: Moments

=== EPs ===
- 2012: Damian McGinty EP
- 2018: No More Time EP

=== Singles ===
- 2012: "Run"
- 2014: "Let the River Run"
- 2016: "How Deep is Your Love"
- 2017: "Photograph"
- 2018: "Geronimo"
- 2019: "Home Sweet Home"
- 2019: "Saltwater"
- 2021: "City of Angels"
- 2022: "Like Moments Do"
- 2022: "Nobody Ever Grows Up"
- 2022: "Turn the Lights Off"
- 2022: "Slow Down"
- 2022: "Last Goodbye"
- 2022: "Catch a Tear"
- 2022: "Paper Rings and Silly Love Songs"
- 2022: "Summertime Forever"
- 2022: "Until it’s Gone"
- 2022: "Love Like That"
- 2024: "A Million Little Ways"
- 2024: "10,000 Days"
- 2024: "One More Dance"
- 2024: "Wind at My Back"
- 2024: "Lean Into Love"

== Appearances ==
=== Celtic Thunder concerts DVD/CD ===
- Celtic Thunder (2008)
- Act Two (2008)
- Take Me Home (2009)
- It's Entertainment! (2010)
- Christmas (2010)
- Heritage (2011)
- Storm (2011)
- The Very Best of Celtic Thunder (2015)
- Legacy, Vol. 1 (2016)
- Legacy, Vol. 2 (2016)
- Inspirational (2017)
- X (2018)

=== Glee Cast ===
- Glee: The Music, The Christmas Album Volume 2
- Glee: The Music, Volume 7
- Glee: The Music Presents Glease
