= Glee: The Music, The Graduation Album =

Soundtrack album by Glee Cast
- Released: May 15, 2012
- Genre: Soundtrack
- Labels: Columbia, 20th Century Fox TV

Glee Cast chronology
| Glee: The Music, Volume 7 (2011) | Glee: The Music, The Graduation Album (2012) | Britney 2.0 (2012) |

Glee: The Music, The Graduation Album is the twelfth soundtrack album by the cast of the American musical television series Glee. It was released by Columbia Records on May 15, 2012. The album features eight songs recorded for the third-season finale, "Goodbye", only five of which were performed in the episode.

== Track listing ==
Unless otherwise indicated, Information is based on Liner notes

| No. | Title | Writer(s) | Original artist | Length |
|---|---|---|---|---|
| 1. | "We Are Young" | Jack Antonoff, Jeff Bhasker, Andrew Dost, Nate Ruess | fun. featuring Janelle Monáe | 4:09 |
| 2. | "The Edge of Glory" | Stefani Germanotta, Fernando Garibay, Paul Blair | Lady Gaga | 4:22 |
| 3. | "I Won't Give Up" | Jason Mraz, Michael Natter | Jason Mraz | 4:01 |
| 4. | "We Are the Champions" | Freddie Mercury | Queen | 3:12 |
| 5. | "School's Out" | Alice Cooper, Michael Bruce, Glen Buxton, Dennis Dunaway, Neal Smith | Alice Cooper | 3:22 |
| 6. | "I Was Here" | Diane Warren | Beyoncé | 3:58 |
| 7. | "I'll Remember" | Madonna Ciccone, Patrick Leonard, Richard Page | Madonna | 4:13 |
| 8. | "You Get What You Give" | Gregg Alexander, Rick Nowels | New Radicals | 4:45 |
| 9. | "Not the End" | Chuck Butler, Luke Brown | The So Manys; The Bravery | 3:29 |
| 10. | "Roots Before Branches" | Adam Anders, Nikki Anders | Room for Two | 4:20 |
| 11. | "Glory Days" | Bruce Springsteen | Bruce Springsteen | 3:32 |
| 12. | "Forever Young" | Rod Stewart, Jim Cregan, Bob Dylan, Kevin Savigar | Rod Stewart (Based on song of same name by Bob Dylan) | 3:54 |
| 13. | "Good Riddance (Time of Your Life)" | Billie Joe Armstrong, Frank Wright, Michael Pritchard | Green Day | 2:31 |

Japanese bonus tracks
| No. | Title | Writer(s) | Original artist(s) | Length |
|---|---|---|---|---|
| 14. | "Paradise by the Dashboard Light" | Jim Steinman | Meat Loaf | 3:50 |
| 15. | "Here's to Us" | Halestorm, Toby Gad, Danielle Brisebois | Halestorm | 3:02 |

== Personnel ==
Unless otherwise indicated, Information is taken from the album's Liner notes

- Dianna Agron – lead vocals (1–2, 4)
- Adam Anders – music arranger, vocal arranger, digital editing, producer, soundtrack producer, additional background vocals
- Alex Anders – engineer, digital editing, additional vocal producer, additional background vocals
- Nikki Anders – additional background vocals
- Peer Åström – music arranger, producer, engineer, mixing
- Kala Balch – additional background vocals
- Emily Benford – additional background vocals
- Joshua Blanchard – assistant engineer
- RaVaughn Brown – additional background vocals
- Geoff Bywater – executive in charge of music
- Deyder Cintron – assistant engineer, digital editing, additional background vocals
- Chris Colfer – lead vocals (4, 7)
- Kamari Copeland – additional background vocals
- Darren Criss – lead vocals
- Tim Davis – vocal contractor, additional background vocals
- Tommy Denander – guitars
- Dante Di Loreto – executive producer
- Henrik Edenhed – mixing
- Luke Edgemon – additional background vocals
- Brad Falchuk – executive producer
- Ryan Gillmor – assistant engineer
- Missi Hale – additional background vocals
- Fredrik Jansson – assistant engineer
- Storm Lee – additional background vocals
- David Loucks – additional background vocals
- Lea Michele – lead vocals (1, 3–4, 6, 8, 10, 13)
- Cory Monteith – lead vocals (1, 4, 8–11, 13)
- Matthew Morrison – lead vocals (12)
- Ryan Murphy – producer, soundtrack producer
- Jeanette Olsson – additional background vocals
- Chord Overstreet – lead vocals (1, 8, 13)
- Tiffany Palmer – additional background vocals
- Martin Persson – music programming
- Ryan Petersen – assistant engineer
- Zac Poor – additional background vocals
- Nicole Ray – production coordinator
- Amber Riley – lead vocals (1–2, 8, 13)
- Naya Rivera – lead vocals (1–2, 4)
- Mark Salling – lead vocals (4–5, 11)
- Drew Ryan Scott – additional background vocals
- Onitsha Shaw – additional background vocals
- Jenna Ushkowitz – lead vocals (2)
- Windy Wagner – additional background vocals
- Joe Wohlmuth – assistant engineer

== Charts ==
Chart performance for Glee: The Music, The Graduation Album
| Chart (2012) | Peak position |
|---|---|
| Australian Albums (ARIA) | 12 |
| Canadian Albums (Billboard) | 6 |
| Irish Albums (IRMA) | 14 |
| New Zealand Albums (RMNZ) | 21 |
| UK Albums (Official Charts) | 17 |
| US Billboard 200 | 8 |
| US Soundtrack Albums (Billboard) | 2 |
