= Glee: The Music, The Christmas Album Volume 2 =

Album by Glee

Soundtrack album by Glee cast
- Released: November 11, 2011
- Genre: Christmas
- Label: Columbia / 20th Century Fox TV

Glee cast chronology
Glee: The 3D Concert Movie (Motion Picture Soundtrack) (2011)	Glee: The Music, The Christmas Album Volume 2 (2011)	Glee: The Music, Volume 7 (2011)

Glee: The Music, The Christmas Album Volume 2 is the tenth soundtrack album by the cast of the American musical television series Glee, released by Columbia Records on November 11, 2011.

== Background ==
The album features twelve Christmas tunes: ten covers and two original songs. The original songs are both written by Adam Anders, Peer Åström and Shelly Peiken: "Extraordinary Merry Christmas" and "Christmas Eve with You". In addition to featuring twelve of the starring characters from the television show's third season (only Dianna Agron, Jane Lynch and Harry Shum Jr. are not listed), all four of the finalists from The Glee Project are featured: Damian McGinty solos on "Blue Christmas", Samuel Larsen is featured with Cory Monteith and Mark Salling on "Santa Claus Is Coming to Town", and runners-up Lindsay Pearce and Alex Newell duet on "Do You Hear What I Hear?"

The album debuted on the Billboard 200 at number six, selling 71,000 copies in its first week.

== Reception ==
Professional ratings
Review scores
Source	Rating
AllMusic	3.5/5 stars

Heather Phares of AllMusic gave the album a rating of three-and-a-half stars out of a possible five, and wrote that "listeners know what to expect" and the album "delivers just that". She praised Amber Riley's "All I Want for Christmas Is You" as "charming", Naya Rivera's "Santa Baby" as "mischievous", Heather Morris's "Christmas Wrapping" as "brilliant", and Chris Colfer and Darren Criss for their "brassy, breezy" version of "Let It Snow". She did note that the album "flags" when "unfamiliar" songs are presented and singled out the original song "Extraordinary Merry Christmas" in this regard. She also criticized the final song of the album, "Do They Know It's Christmas?", and described it as "overwrought".

== Track listing ==
Unless otherwise indicated, information is based on the liner notes.

No.	Title	Writer(s)	Performer	Length
1.	"All I Want for Christmas Is You"	Mariah Carey, Walter Afanasieff	Amber Riley	4:03
2.	"Extraordinary Merry Christmas"	Adam Anders, Peer Åström, Shelly Peiken	Darren Criss and Lea Michele	3:39
3.	"Santa Baby"	Joan Javits, Philip Springer, Tony Springer	Naya Rivera	2:31
4.	"Christmas Eve with You"	Anders, Åström, Peiken	Matthew Morrison and Jayma Mays	3:28
5.	"Little Drummer Boy"	Katherine K. Davis, Harry Simeone, Henry Onorati	Kevin McHale	2:56
6.	"River"	Joni Mitchell	Michele	4:03
7.	"Do You Hear What I Hear?"	Noël Regney, Gloria Shayne Baker	Alex Newell and Lindsay Pearce	3:52
8.	"Let It Snow"	Sammy Cahn, Jule Styne	Chris Colfer and Criss	2:47
9.	"Santa Claus Is Coming to Town"	John Frederick Coots, Haven Gillespie	Cory Monteith, Mark Salling and Samuel Larsen	2:49
10.	"Christmas Wrapping"	Chris Butler	Heather Morris	4:03
11.	"Blue Christmas"	Billy Hayes, Jay W. Johnson	Damian McGinty	3:49
12.	"Do They Know It's Christmas?"	Bob Geldof, Midge Ure	Colfer, Criss, McHale, Michele, Monteith, Morris, Riley, Rivera, Salling and Jenna Ushkowitz	3:35

Notes

- While Dianna Agron and Jane Lynch are credited as part of the Glee cast vocals in the liner notes, they are not credited on any tracks.
- "Santa Baby" samples the instrumental track of Madonna's cover version
- "River" samples the piano track from Joni Mitchell's original version
- The musical arrangement of "Santa Claus Is Coming To Town" is based on the Bruce Springsteen cover version

== Personnel ==
- Dianna Agron – vocals
- Adam Anders – arranger, composer, digital editing, producer, soundtrack producer, vocal arrangement, additional vocals
- Alex Anders – digital editing, engineer, vocal producer, additional vocals
- Nikki Anders – additional vocals
- Peer Åström – arranger, composer, engineer, mixing, producer
- Kala Balch – additional vocals
- Glen Ballard – composer
- Dave Bett – art direction
- Joshua Blanchard – assistant engineer
- PJ Bloom – music supervisor
- Anita Marisa Boriboon – art direction
- Ravaughn Brown – additional vocals
- Chris Butler – composer
- Geoff Bywater – executive in charge of music
- Mariah Carey – composer
- Deyder Cintron – assistant engineer, digital editing
- Chris Colfer – lead vocals
- Kamari Copeland – additional vocals
- Darren Criss – lead vocals
- Tim Davis – vocal contractor, additional vocals
- Dante Di Loreto – soundtrack executive producer
- Brad Falchuk – soundtrack executive producer
- Emily Gomez – additional vocals
- Heather Guibert – coordination
- Missi Hale – additional vocals
- Billy Hayes – composer
- Fredrik Jansson – assistant engineer
- Joan Javits – composer
- Samuel Larsen – lead vocals
- Storm Lee – additional vocals
- David Loucks – additional vocals
- Jane Lynch – vocals
- Meaghan Lyons – coordination
- Dominick Maita – mastering
- Jayma Mays – lead vocals
- Damian McGinty – lead vocals
- Kevin McHale – lead vocals
- Lea Michele – lead vocals
- Cory Monteith – lead vocals
- Heather Morris – lead vocals
- Matthew Morrison – lead vocals
- Ryan Murphy – producer, soundtrack producer
- Alex Newell – lead vocals
- Jeanette Olsson – additional vocals
- Lindsay Pearce – lead vocals
- Shelly Peiken – composer
- Martin Persson – programming
- Nicole Ray – production coordination
- Amber Riley – lead vocals
- Naya Rivera – lead vocals
- Mark Salling – lead vocals
- Drew Ryan Scott – additional vocals
- Onitsha Shaw – additional vocals
- Gloria Shayne – composer
- Jenny Sinclair – coordination
- Jenna Ushkowitz – lead vocals
- Windy Wagner – additional vocals

Source: AllMusic

== Charts ==
=== Weekly charts ===
Chart (2011)	Peak position
Australian Albums (ARIA)	24
Canadian Albums (Billboard)	6
Irish Albums (IRMA)	46
Scottish Albums (OCC)	67
UK Albums (OCC)	60
US Billboard 200	6
US Top Holiday Albums (Billboard)	3
US Soundtrack Albums (Billboard)	1

=== Year-end charts ===
Chart (2012)	Position
US Billboard 200	95
US Soundtrack Albums (Billboard)	3
