= Bella (album) =

Studio album by Teddy Thompson
- Released: February 7, 2011
- Recorded: New York City
- Genre: Pop, folk
- Label: Decca, Verve Forecast
- Producer: David Kahne

Teddy Thompson chronology
| A Piece of What You Need (2008) | Bella (2011) | Family (2014) |

Bella is the fifth studio album by singer-songwriter Teddy Thompson, released through the record labels Decca and Verve Forecast in February 2011. Produced by David Kahne, the album features members of Thompson's touring band with Ethan Eubanks on drums, Jeff Hill on bass and Daniel Mintseris on keyboards.

== Songs ==
The album's opening track, "Looking for a Girl", has a twelve-bar blues structure and has been complimented for its "strong beat and catchy melodies".

This is the first of Thompson's albums not to feature an Everly Brothers cover as a hidden track.

== Tour ==
During January and February 2011, Thompson toured throughout the United Kingdom.

== Critical reception ==
Hannah Spencer's review for Contactmusic.com was positive, complimenting Thompson's "great vocal flexibility" and ability to put together a "solid and inoffensive collection of honest-lyriced tunes". On the review site Metacritic, as of February 21, 2011, the album had a score of 71 which indicates Generally Favorable reviews. Allmusic rated the album four out of five stars.

== Track listing ==
1. "Looking for a Girl" – 3:23
2. "Delilah" – 3:28
3. "I Feel" – 3:25
4. "Over and Over" – 4:10
5. "Take Me Back Again" – 4:14
6. "Tell Me What You Want" – 3:26
7. "Home" – 4:06
8. "The Next One" – 3:48
9. "Take Care of Yourself" – 3:17
10. "The One I Can't Have" – 2:47
11. "Gotta Have Someone" – 3:21

== Personnel ==
- Ethan Eubanks – drums
- Jeff Hill – bass
- David Kahne – keyboards, guitar and string arrangements
- Daniel Mintseris – keyboards
- Dave Schramm (musician) – electric guitar solo on "Looking for a Girl"
- Richard Thompson – guitar
- Teddy Thompson – vocals, guitar

== Release history ==
| Region | Date | Label | Format | Catalog |
|---|---|---|---|---|
| United Kingdom | February 7, 2011 | Decca Records | CD | |
| United States | February 8, 2011 | Verve Forecast Records | CD | 001467202 |
