= Prom-asaurus =

- Glee episode
- Episode no.: Season 3 Episode 19
- Directed by: Eric Stoltz
- Written by: Ryan Murphy
- Production code: 3ARC19
- Original air date: May 8, 2012

Guest appearances
- Iqbal Theba as Principal Figgins; Chord Overstreet as Sam Evans; Lauren Potter as Becky Jackson; Samuel Larsen as Joe Hart; Damian McGinty as Rory Flanagan; B.K. Cannon as a prom committee member; LaMarcus Tinker as Shane Tinsley; Helen Mirren as the inner voice of Becky Jackson (uncredited)

Episode chronology
← Previous "Choke"	Next → "Props"
- Glee season 3

"Prom-asaurus" is the nineteenth episode of the third season of the American musical television series Glee, and the sixty-third overall. Written by Ryan Murphy and directed by Eric Stoltz, the episode aired on Fox in the United States on May 8, 2012, and features McKinley High's senior prom.

Prom-asaurus attracted 6.67 million American viewers during its initial airing and received a 2.7/8 Nielsen rating/share in the 18–49 demographic, up significantly from the 2.5/8 rating/share and 6.01 million viewers of the previous episode, "Choke", which was broadcast on May 1, 2012.

== Plot ==
McKinley High Principal Figgins (Iqbal Theba) has a talk with Brittany (Heather Morris) for being an ineffective senior class president, and tells her that he is considering abolishing the position. As a result, Brittany vows to make the upcoming senior prom a memorable one. She decides that the prom will have a dinosaur theme and imposes a ban on hair gel at the prom, which upsets Blaine (Darren Criss), an extensive user of hair gel.

Sue (Jane Lynch) announces the three finalists for prom king and prom queen, which include Finn (Cory Monteith) and Brittany for prom king, and Santana (Naya Rivera) and Quinn (Dianna Agron) for prom queen. Becky Jackson (Lauren Potter) is very upset that she was not nominated. Rachel (Lea Michele) is upset to see a poster touting Finn and Quinn's joint candidacy and confronts him, knowing that Finn lied to her about the posters, and is upset that her fiancé will be dancing at the prom with Quinn—his ex-girlfriend—instead of with her. Finn misunderstands why he didn’t tell Rachel the truth. Meanwhile, Quinn has made progress in her physical therapy, with Joe's (Samuel Larsen) aid, and has regained some of her ability to walk. She asks Joe to keep it a secret until after the prom. Later, after seeing Quinn use her recent disability to gain a sympathy vote from a student, Finn starts to have misgivings about their joint campaign.

After discussing her own misgivings about the prom with Blaine and Kurt (Chris Colfer), Rachel decides to throw an anti-prom party at a hotel. Puck (Mark Salling), still dejected after failing an exam he needed to pass in order to graduate, agrees to go, as does a still-angry Becky. The party starts off awkwardly, and Becky calls it "the worst anti-prom ever". Meanwhile, at the prom, Finn walks in on Quinn, who is standing up in the restroom and is upset that he chose her over Rachel because of her fake disability. Finn chides Quinn for using her wheelchair to bribe votes and calls her out for being self-centered. Quinn begs Finn to stay for their mandatory dance, which he agrees to, but during the dance he physically threatens her to stand up and continues ranting about her selfish acts to get prom votes. Joe confronts Finn and Sue threatens to kick him out of the prom, but Finn leaves voluntarily. He arrives at the anti-prom party and urges Rachel and the others to return to the prom with him. Rachel agrees to go, as do Kurt and Blaine, but Puck and Becky stay behind. Finn buys Rachel a corsage and presents it to her. Becky tells Puck about her desire to become a prom queen, and he decides to crown himself and Becky as the king and queen of the anti-prom, fashioning crowns out of a beer box, after which the two also return to the prom.

At McKinley, Rachel apologizes to Quinn about Finn’s mistake and tells Quinn that she voted for her, and is happy that they became friends. Santana and Quinn count the prom king and queen votes, only to discover that four people voted for Brittany for king and Finn won, while Quinn has defeated Santana by a single vote. Despite the title being what both wanted, Santana realizes she didn't want to win unless Brittany did as well, and Quinn's victory leaves her feeling empty. After hearing Rachel’s kind words about her, Quinn decides to do Rachel a favor. She conspires with Santana, and after Finn is announced as prom king, Rachel is declared the write-in winner for prom queen as an apology. Finn and Rachel dance to "Take My Breath Away", sung by Quinn and Santana, and Quinn surprises the crowd by shakily standing during the performance.

== Production ==
The episode was directed by Eric Stoltz and written by co-creator Ryan Murphy. It had begun shooting by March 27, 2012, while the previous episode, "Choke", was still being shot, and concluded on April 5, 2012. The prom scenes were completed the day before shooting ended.

Errors: Rachel’s corsage is not properly put on in the hotel. Finn attempts to put it around her hair to use as a ponytail holder instead of on her wrist in a deleted scene to use as a tiara with her wearing the flowers on her head when taking it out of the box to present to her, due to the rubber band underneath the flowers not being strong enough to hold up her hair, but later seen in the gym she is seen wearing it the right way, on her wrist. Quinn’s original campaign posters “Vote Lucy Caboosey” is still on.

Recurring guest stars appearing in the episode include glee club members Sam Evans (Chord Overstreet), Rory Flanagan (Damian McGinty) and Joe Hart (Samuel Larsen), Principal Figgins (Iqbal Theba), cheerleader Becky Jackson (Lauren Potter) and football player and Mercedes' ex-boyfriend Shane Tinsley (LaMarcus Tinker). Helen Mirren made her second uncredited vocal appearance as Becky Jackson's interior voice.

Five songs from the episode were released as singles available for digital download: Selena Gomez & the Scene's "Love You like a Love Song" performed by Rivera, Fergie's "Big Girls Don't Cry" performed by Michele, Colfer and Criss; One Direction's "What Makes You Beautiful" featuring Larsen, McGinty, Overstreet, Kevin McHale and Harry Shum, Jr.; Berlin's "Take My Breath Away" featuring Agron and Rivera; and Ke$ha's "Dinosaur" performed by Morris.

== Reception ==
=== Ratings ===
"Prom-asaurus" was first broadcast on May 8, 2012 in the United States on Fox. It received a 2.7/8 Nielsen rating/share in the 18–49 demographic, and attracted 6.67 million American viewers during its initial airing, up significantly from the 2.5/8 rating/share and 6.01 million viewers of the previous episode, "Choke", which was broadcast on May 1, 2012. Viewership was also up in Canada, where 1.65 million viewers watched the episode on the same day as its American premiere. It was the thirteenth most-viewed show of the week, up from sixteenth in the previous week, when 1.56 million viewers watched "Choke".

In the United Kingdom, "Prom-asaurus" first aired on May 10, 2012, and was watched on Sky 1 by 744,000 viewers. This was a decrease from the most recent episode for which viewership data is available, "Saturday Night Glee-ver", which attracted 827,000 viewers when it aired three weeks earlier on April 19, 2012. In Australia, "Prom-asaurus" was also broadcast on May 10, 2012. It was watched by 636,000 viewers, an increase of over 7% from the 593,000 viewers for "Choke" on May 3, 2012. Glee was the thirteenth most-watched program of the night, up from eighteenth the week before.

=== Music and performances ===
In December 2012, TV Guide listed the "Dinosaur" rendition of as one of Glee's worst performances.

=== Chart history ===
Three of the five singles released for the episode debuted on the lower regions of the UK Singles Chart. "Big Girls Don't Cry" at number 132, "What Makes You Beautiful" at number 162, and "Love You like a Love Song" at number 182. The sole song to chart in North America on the Canadian Hot 100 was "What Makes You Beautiful", which debuted at number 93.
