= Choke (Glee) =

- Glee episode
- Episode no.: Season 3 Episode 18
- Directed by: Michael Uppendahl
- Written by: Marti Noxon
- Production code: 3ARC18
- Original air date: May 1, 2012

Guest appearances
- Whoopi Goldberg as Carmen Tibideaux; Dot-Marie Jones as Shannon Beiste; Chord Overstreet as Sam Evans; NeNe Leakes as Roz Washington; Thomas Calabro as Mr. Puckerman; Samuel Larsen as Joe Hart; Vanessa Lengies as Sugar Motta; Damian McGinty as Rory Flanagan; Eric Bruskotter as Cooter Menkins; Kathleen M. Darcy as Eleanor Doosenbury; Rebecca Staab as Mrs. Collins

Episode chronology
← Previous "Dance with Somebody"	Next → "Prom-asaurus"
- Glee season 3

"Choke" is the eighteenth episode of the third season of the American musical television series Glee, and the sixty-second overall. Written by Marti Noxon and directed by Michael Uppendahl, the episode aired on Fox in the United States on May 1, 2012, and features the first appearance of special guest star Whoopi Goldberg as Carmen Tibideaux, Dean of the New York Academy of Dramatic Arts (NYADA), and the introduction of Puck's father (Thomas Calabro).

Upon its initial airing, Choke attracted 6.01 million American viewers and received a 2.5/8 Nielsen rating/share in the 18–49 demographic, down significantly from the 2.7/8 rating/share and 6.90 million viewers of the previous episode, "Dance with Somebody", which was broadcast a week before.

== Plot ==
Rachel (Lea Michele) is focusing her upcoming NYADA audition, while Kurt (Chris Colfer) has a difficult time deciding what song to perform. Rachel advises him to go with a song he knows he can sing well. Rachel reveals that they will be auditioning for Carmen Tibideaux (Whoopi Goldberg), a famous and exacting performer and a newly appointed dean at the school. At the last minute Kurt decides to sing Not the Boy Next Door from The Boy from Oz, a song he claims is "something a little more out there, but much more me". Tibideaux is impressed by both his performance and the risk he took. Rachel sings Don't Rain on My Parade, a song she has known well since she was a child, but she forgets the lyrics and asks for another chance. After she stumbles again on her second attempt, Carmen ends the audition.

Cheerleading co-coach Roz Washington (NeNe Leakes) overhears Santana (Naya Rivera) jokingly suggesting Coach Beiste's (Dot-Marie Jones) black eye was given to her by her husband and informs the girls that domestic violence is not a laughing matter. She teams up with Sue (Jane Lynch) and Beiste—who explains that she was hit by a speed bag—to teach the girls a lesson about domestic violence, and Sue assigns them to sing a song about women getting out of abusive relationships. The girls perform "Cell Block Tango", and Sue and Roz tell them that they completely missed the point of the assignment; the song is about women murdering their significant others for trivial reasons. Beiste, who walked out on the performance, tells Sue and Roz that her husband Cooter (Eric Bruskotter) actually did hit her. Sue insists that Beiste stay at her place, but Beiste says she is staying with her sister. Beiste reveals the truth about her black eye to the girls but does not reveal that she has given Cooter another chance.

Finn (Cory Monteith) is worried that Puck (Mark Salling) will not graduate. Puck tells Finn that he only needs to pass a European geography test to graduate, and that he plans to flirt with his teacher to secure a passing grade. However, she rejects his overtures, telling him to study instead, and Puck decides to drop out. Later, while Puck is cleaning a client's swimming pool, his father (Thomas Calabro)—who he has not heard from in five years—shows up and asks Puck for money to pay his rent. Realizing that he does not want to turn out like his father—also a high school dropout—Puck enlists the other glee club males to help him study. After taking the test, he feels confident about his effort; however, he fails the test.

== Production ==
The episode was directed by Michael Uppendahl and written by consulting producer Marti Noxon. It began shooting on March 12, 2012, and the first and final days overlapped with the preceding and succeeding episodes. The previous episode, "Dance with Somebody", concluded on March 15, 2012, while the following episode, "Prom-asaurus", began filming no later than March 27, 2012. "Choke" continued shooting at least through March 30, 2012, when scenes from three different episodes were shot.

Whoopi Goldberg makes the first in a series of special guest appearances as famous theater personality and NYADA dean Carmen Tibideaux. Goldberg, who does not fly on planes, traveled on a "fancy" bus from New York to Los Angeles in order to film her scenes. Thomas Calabro debuts as Puck's father. Recurring guest stars appearing in the episode include glee club members Sam Evans (Chord Overstreet), Rory Flanagan (Damian McGinty), Sugar Motta (Vanessa Lengies) and Joe Hart (Samuel Larsen), football coach Shannon Beiste (Jones) and cheerleading co-coach Roz Washington (Leakes).

Six of the eight songs performed during the episode were released as singles available for digital download: "The Rain in Spain" from the musical My Fair Lady sung by the New Directions males; "Not the Boy Next Door" from the musical The Boy from Oz performed by Colfer; "Cell Block Tango" from the musical Chicago and Florence and the Machine's "Shake It Out", both performed by Naya Rivera, Amber Riley, Jenna Ushkowitz, Heather Morris and Lengies; Alice Cooper's "School's Out" performed by Salling; and Kelly Clarkson's "Cry" performed by Michele. "School's Out" is also featured on the soundtrack album Glee: The Music, The Graduation Album. The two remaining songs are "Don't Rain on My Parade" from the musical Funny Girl—which is being sung for a second time by Michele, who previously performed it in the first-season episode "Sectionals"—and "The Music of the Night" from the musical The Phantom of the Opera.

== Reception ==
=== Ratings ===
"Choke" was first broadcast on May 1, 2012 in the United States on Fox. It received a 2.5/8 Nielsen rating/share in the 18–49 demographic, and attracted 6.01 million American viewers during its initial airing, down significantly from the 2.7/8 rating/share and 6.90 million viewers of the previous episode, "Dance with Somebody", which was broadcast on April 24, 2012. Unlike in the US, viewership was up slightly in Canada, where 1.56 million viewers watched the episode on the same day as its American premiere. Despite the increase in viewers, it was the sixteenth most-viewed show of the week, down from twelfth in the previous week, when 1.53 million viewers watched "Dance with Somebody".

In Australia, "Choke" was broadcast on May 3, 2012. It was watched by 593,000 viewers, a decrease of over 3% from the 614,000 viewers for "Dance with Somebody" on April 26, 2012. Glee dropped to the eighteenth most-watched program of the night, down from seventeenth the week before.

=== Chart history ===
Two of the six singles released for the episode debuted on North American top 100 charts. The sole song to chart in the US on the Billboard Hot 100 was "Shake It Out", which debuted at number 71. Two songs charted on the Billboard Canadian Hot 100: "Shake It Out" debuted at number 60 and "Cry" at number 96. Florence and the Machine's version of "Shake It Out" re-entered the Canadian Hot 100 chart that same week at number 76. It had previously spent nine weeks on that chart, reaching as high as number 52.
