= Dance with Somebody (Glee) =

- Glee episode
- Episode no.: Season 3 Episode 17
- Directed by: Paris Barclay
- Written by: Ross Maxwell
- Production code: 3ARC17
- Original air date: April 24, 2012

Guest appearances
- Mike O'Malley as Burt Hummel; Chord Overstreet as Sam Evans; Joel McKinnon Miller as Richard Lavender; Samuel Larsen as Joe Hart; Justin Castor as Chandler Kiehl

Episode chronology
← Previous "Saturday Night Glee-ver"	Next → "Choke"
- Glee season 3

"Dance with Somebody" is the seventeenth episode of the third season of the American musical television series Glee, and the sixty-first overall. Written by Ross Maxwell and directed by Paris Barclay, the episode aired on Fox in the United States on April 24, 2012. It is a special tribute episode to Whitney Houston, who died ten weeks earlier (February 11), and features seven of her songs.

Upon its initial airing, this episode attracted 6.90 million American viewers and received a 2.7/8 Nielsen rating/share in the 18–49 demographic, an increase of over 10% from the 2.4/7 rating/share and 6.23 million viewers of the previous episode, "Saturday Night Glee-ver", which was broadcast on April 17, 2012.

== Plot ==
Will (Matthew Morrison) notices that several of the glee club members are still dejected two months after the death of Whitney Houston. School counselor Emma (Jayma Mays) explains that they are focusing on the pain of Whitney's death so that they do not have to think of the pain of leaving their friends after graduation. Will makes their assignment for the week a tribute to Houston.

While shopping for sheet music in preparation for his performance, Kurt (Chris Colfer) meets Chandler (Justin Castor), a student from another school, who helps him choose a song. The two exchange telephone numbers, and later Chandler sends flirtatious text messages to Kurt, who responds to them positively. Kurt sees the exchanges as innocent, but his boyfriend Blaine (Darren Criss) sees it as cheating. The two get into an argument, and Blaine sings "It's Not Right but It's Okay" to express his feelings. Later, Kurt and his father Burt (Mike O'Malley) discuss Kurt's future in New York. Burt tells Kurt that he misses the boy that Kurt used to be. Kurt then sings "I Have Nothing" to express his regrets to Blaine. Following a counseling session with Emma, Blaine reveals that he has been distant because he's deeply distressed at the thought of Kurt moving to New York, and how it will affect their relationship. The two make up.

Brittany (Heather Morris) and Santana (Naya Rivera) sing "I Wanna Dance with Somebody (Who Loves Me)", inviting the rest of the club to dance with them during the performance. Quinn (Dianna Agron), still using a wheelchair after her car accident, refuses to participate, and reveals to Joe (Samuel Larsen) that she is depressed because she has not been making progress in her physical therapy sessions; Joe responds by offering to accompany Quinn to her physical therapy. They then sing a duet of "Saving All My Love for You", but Quinn believes Joe is not interested in a relationship because she is disabled. At another physical therapy session, Joe and Quinn discuss their ambiguous relationship, and decide that it is "something new".

Will hires a wedding planner (Joel McKinnon Miller) for his upcoming wedding with Emma. After some disagreement over the logistics behind planning a wedding a month away, Will fires the wedding planner and admits that he wants to get married before the glee club members go their separate ways; Emma assures him that no matter when they decide to get married, the glee club would be there.

After performing "So Emotional" with Santana, Rachel Berry (Lea Michele) realizes that she and Santana could have been friends instead of the enemies they were for most of their high school years; they agree to be friends. Puck (Mark Salling), meanwhile, thanks the male glee club members for always being his friends when he was not always a friend to them. New Directions then spontaneously gathers in the auditorium and sings "My Love Is Your Love".

== Production ==
"Dance with Somebody" is the second episode in the third season to be directed by Paris Barclay, and the second to be written by Ross Maxwell. The episode began shooting on March 8, 2012, only 25 days after Whitney Houston's death, and concluded shooting a week later on March 15, 2012. The next episode began shooting in parallel on March 12, 2012. The same day that shooting began, it was reported that the episode would be a tribute to Whitney Houston and feature her songs, though "not be a typical tribute" as the show had previously done for artists but rather a "character piece".

Recurring guest stars appearing in the episode include Kurt's father Burt Hummel (O'Malley) and glee club members Sam Evans (Overstreet) and Joe Hart (Larsen). Former glee club member Matt Rutherford (Dijon Talton) is seen in a still photograph near the end of the episode.

Seven of Houston's songs are featured in the episode, and all have been released as singles available for digital download. These songs are "How Will I Know" in an a cappella version sung by Riley, Rivera, Colfer and Michele, "I Wanna Dance with Somebody (Who Loves Me)", "Saving All My Love for You", "So Emotional", "It's Not Right but It's Okay", "I Have Nothing" and "My Love Is Your Love".

== Reception ==
=== Ratings ===
"Dance with Somebody" was first broadcast on April 24, 2012, in the United States on Fox. It received a 2.7/8 Nielsen rating/share in the 18–49 demographic, and attracted 6.90 million American viewers during its initial airing, an increase of over 10% from the 2.4/7 rating/share and 6.23 million viewers of the previous episode, "Saturday Night Glee-ver", which was broadcast on April 17, 2012. Viewership was virtually unchanged in Canada, where 1.53 million viewers watched the episode on the same day as its American premiere. It was the twelfth most-viewed show of the week, the same as in the previous week, when 1.54 million viewers watched "Saturday Night Glee-ver".

Viewership was also virtually unchanged in the United Kingdom, where "Dance with Somebody" first aired on April 19, 2012, and was watched on Sky 1 by 827,000 viewers, as compared to the 822,000 viewers who watched "Saturday Night Glee-ver" when it aired the week before. In Australia, "Dance with Somebody" was broadcast on April 26, 2012. It was watched by 614,000 viewers, an increase of 8% from the 568,000 viewers for "Saturday Night Glee-ver" on April 19, 2012. Despite the greater viewership, Glee dropped to the seventeenth most-watched program of the night, down from sixteenth the week before.

=== Chart history ===
Of the seven singles released for the episode, three debuted on North American top 100 charts. Two of these charted on the Billboard Hot 100: "How Will I Know" debuted at number 65 and "It's Not Right but It's Okay" debuted at number 92. Three songs charted on the Billboard Canadian Hot 100: "How Will I Know" debuted at number 61, "It's Not Right but It's Okay" debuted at number 75 and "I Wanna Dance with Somebody (Who Loves Me)" debuted at number 80.

The same week as the Glee singles charted, Houston's Whitney: The Greatest Hits album jumped back to number one on the Billboard Top Catalog Albums chart, and climbed seven spots to number 28 on the Billboard 200.
