= Big Brother (Glee) =

- Glee episode
- Episode no.: Season 3 Episode 15
- Directed by: Eric Stoltz
- Written by: Michael Hitchcock
- Production code: 3ARC15
- Original air date: April 10, 2012

Guest appearances
- Matt Bomer as Cooper Anderson; Iqbal Theba as Principal Figgins; NeNe Leakes as Roz Washington; Chord Overstreet as Sam Evans; Damian McGinty as Rory Flanagan; Samuel Larsen as Joe Hart; Vanessa Lengies as Sugar Motta; Lauren Potter as Becky Jackson; Fay Hauser as Sue's doctor

Episode chronology
← Previous "On My Way"	Next → "Saturday Night Glee-ver"
- Glee season 3

"Big Brother" is the fifteenth episode and spring premiere of the third season of the American musical television series Glee, and the fifty-ninth overall. Written by Michael Hitchcock and directed by Eric Stoltz, the episode first aired on Fox in the United States on April 10, 2012. It features the introduction of special guest star Matt Bomer as Blaine Anderson's (Darren Criss) elder brother Cooper, and the revelation of how badly injured Quinn Fabray (Dianna Agron) had been in the automobile accident that had ended the previous episode, "On My Way".

The episode received mixed to positive reviews, and most critics praised Bomer's performance as the elder Anderson brother. Reviewers were divided in their opinions of how Quinn's storyline played out, though with her in a wheelchair, there were a number of favorable comments about her scenes with Artie, who acted as her wheelchair mentor. Their two songs together were given a mixed response and did not chart; by contrast, "Somebody That I Used to Know", performed by Bomer and Criss, was given an enthusiastic reception, and sold 152,000 digital copies in the US in its first week. The song charted on the Billboard Hot 100 ahead of the other Bomer and Criss duet, a mashup of "Hungry Like the Wolf" and "Rio". These two songs, along with "Fighter", a Criss solo, charted on the Billboard Canadian Hot 100.

Upon its initial airing, this episode was viewed by 6.76 million American viewers and received a 2.7/8 Nielsen rating/share in the 18–49 demographic. The total viewership was down significantly from the winter finale, "On My Way", which had been broadcast seven weeks previously.

== Plot ==
Quinn's (Dianna Agron) car accident has left her in a wheelchair, suffering from a severely compressed spine. On her return to school, she performs "I'm Still Standing" for the glee club with Artie (Kevin McHale), and tells them she is happy to have survived and they should not feel sorry for her: she has some feeling in her legs and is planning on a full recovery.

Principal Figgins (Iqbal Theba) informs Sue (Jane Lynch) that swim coach Roz Washington (NeNe Leakes) is now Sue's cheerleading co-coach. Sue makes a deal with Figgins: if she helps New Directions win the Nationals show choir competition, she can regain sole control of the Cheerios. Sue offers Will (Matthew Morrison) her assistance and takes over dance rehearsals. She is a harsh and insulting taskmaster, which upsets the glee club.

Cooper Anderson (Matt Bomer), Blaine's (Darren Criss) older brother and an actor in television ads, visits McKinley High and is treated as a celebrity by Blaine's boyfriend Kurt (Chris Colfer) and Sue. Blaine is unhappy, though, when after he and Cooper do an impromptu mashup of two Duran Duran songs in the choir room, Cooper finds fault with Blaine's singing. Sue recruits Cooper to give an acting master class for the club, which contains such bad advice that Blaine is appalled. Worse, Cooper subsequently criticizes Blaine's acting in a class scene.

Most of New Directions goes on a "senior ditch day" to Six Flags, but Artie takes Quinn to a skate park designed for people with disabilities to enjoy adventurous sports. Quinn has a great time, but when Artie broaches the possibility that she might always need a wheelchair; she asserts that she will walk again. Quinn is later assisted by fellow "God Squad" member Joe (Samuel Larsen), who has been praying for her. Quinn invites Joe to join New Directions, which he does at the end of the episode.

Sue goes to the doctor to find out the sex of her baby, accompanied by Emma (Jayma Mays) and Will. The doctor says that Sue is having a girl, but her amniocentesis results show "irregularities". Sue later tells cheerleader Becky (Lauren Potter), who has Down syndrome, that Sue's baby will be "just like her"; Becky advises Sue to learn to be patient. Sue tells the glee club she will moderate her harsh coaching methods as long as they give her their all.

Puck (Mark Salling) wants Finn (Cory Monteith) to join him in moving his pool-cleaning business to California. Finn demurs, but later broaches the possibility to his fiancée Rachel (Lea Michele) as an alternative to New York. She is aghast, and says she needs him with her in New York; he replies that she needs to be sure she loves him for who he is, not who she wants him to be.

Kurt urges Blaine not to give up on Cooper, who is in the auditorium, and Blaine sings an emotional "Somebody That I Used to Know" to Cooper—and then with him. Afterward, Cooper apologizes to Blaine, and tells him he has always known how truly talented Blaine is. The two determine to be friends as well as brothers.

== Production ==
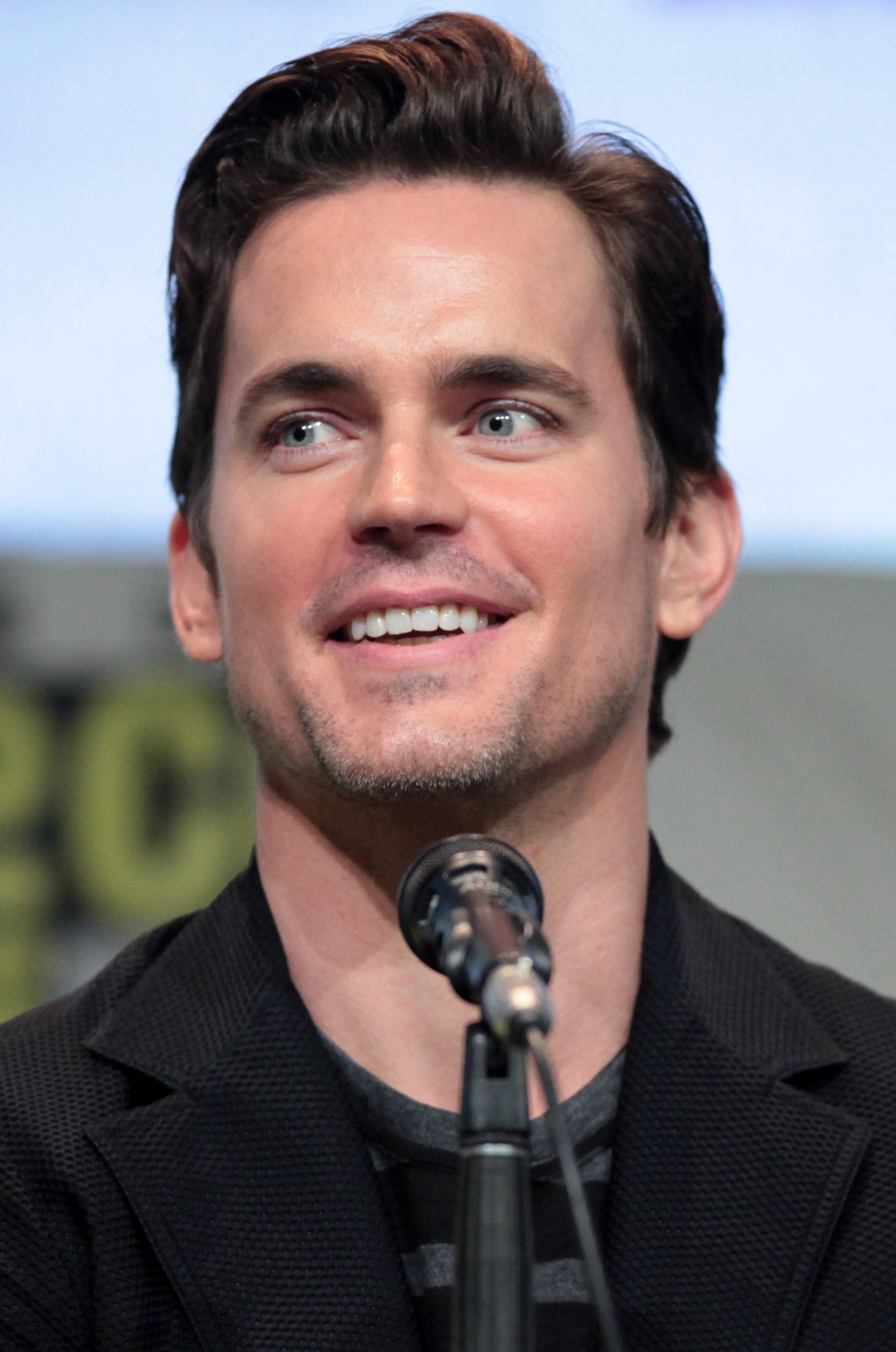
Matt Bomer (pictured) debuts on as Blaine's older brother Cooper Anderson.

"Big Brother" is the fourth episode in the third season to be directed by Eric Stoltz, and the second to be written by Michael Hitchcock. Shooting began by February 10, 2012, and continued at least through February 21; it had ended before February 23, when shooting on the following episode commenced.

The news that Bomer had been cast as Blaine's brother appeared on January 27, 2012. Bomer had suggested to Glee co-creator Ryan Murphy that he consider using Gotye's song featuring Kimbra, "Somebody That I Used to Know", as a duet on the show. Murphy had already thought of doing the song, and a week later Bomer received a text from Murphy asking if he "wanted to come on the show to sing it". Bomer's scenes as Cooper were shot starting February 13. In addition, it was reported in early February that there would be a flashback scene featuring Cooper and Blaine when they were children; young actors were then being cast for the roles.

In addition to duetting on "Somebody That I Used to Know", Bomer and Criss perform a mashup of the Duran Duran songs "Hungry Like the Wolf" and "Rio" early in the episode. Criss also sings Christina Aguilera's "Fighter". These songs were released as singles available for digital download, along with two others from the episode, "Up Up Up" and "I'm Still Standing", both performed by Agron and McHale.

The amusement park scenes in the episode were shot at Six Flags Magic Mountain in Valencia, California. The roller coaster sequences were shot on the Viper ride.

Recurring guest stars appearing in the episode include Principal Figgins (Theba), coach Roz Washington (Leakes), glee club members Sam Evans (Chord Overstreet), Rory Flanagan (Damian McGinty) and Sugar Motta (Vanessa Lengies), cheerleader Becky Jackson (Potter) and recent McKinley transfer student Joe Hart (Larsen).

== Reception ==
=== Ratings ===
"Big Brother" was first broadcast on April 10, 2012, in the United States on Fox. It received a 2.7/8 Nielsen rating/share in the 18–49 demographic, and attracted 6.76 million American viewers during its initial airing, a decrease of approximately 10% from the 3.0/8 rating/share and 7.46 million viewers of the previous episode, "On My Way", which was broadcast on February 21, 2012. Viewership increased in Canada, where 1.79 million viewers watched the episode on the same day as its American premiere. It was the tenth most-viewed show of the week, up five slots and almost 3% from the 1.74 million viewers who watched "On My Way" seven weeks previously.

In the United Kingdom, "Big Brother" first aired on April 12, 2012, and was watched on Sky 1 by 759,000 viewers. Viewership was down slightly from "On My Way", which attracted 763,000 viewers when it aired two weeks before. In Australia, "Big Brother" was broadcast on Thursday, April 12, 2012, a change from the Friday time slot used for the seventh through fourteenth episodes of the season. It was watched by 655,000 viewers, an increase of over 17% from the 558,000 viewers for "On My Way" on March 23, 2012. This made Glee the twelfth most-watched program of the night, up from fifteenth nearly three weeks before.

=== Critical reception ===
The episode received mixed to positive reviews, though most reviewers expressed enthusiasm for guest star Bomer as the elder Anderson brother. Jeff Dodge of BuddyTV wrote that the episode was "very strong", while The A.V. Club's Emily VanDerWerff, although she gave the episode a "B" grade, called it "forgettable" aside from Bomer's performance, which she described as "absolutely terrific". Erin Strecker of Entertainment Weekly characterized the episode as a "laugh-out-loud funny" and Rae Votta of Billboard expressed similar sentiments, though she also said there was "definitely room for improvement" after a show that was "more fluff than substance", albeit "delicious fluff". The Washington Post's Jen Chaney described it as a "pretty lackluster episode".

Bomer received plaudits from most reviewers. Crystal Bell of the Huffington Post called his appearance "perfect casting" and Bomer as one of her favorite guest stars. Strecker and VanDerWerff praised the "hilariously bad acting advice" in Cooper's master class, and VanDerWerff said that the storyline of Blaine being "overshadowed by his charismatic older brother" worked "because the actors were so damn committed to it". Houston Chronicle's Bobby Hankinson was not fond of Cooper's appearance, and described it as "an old-school sitcom cliche to introduce long-lost or oft-neglected family members". Dodge noted that Bomer's role "didn't overshadow everyone else, like some guest stars do".

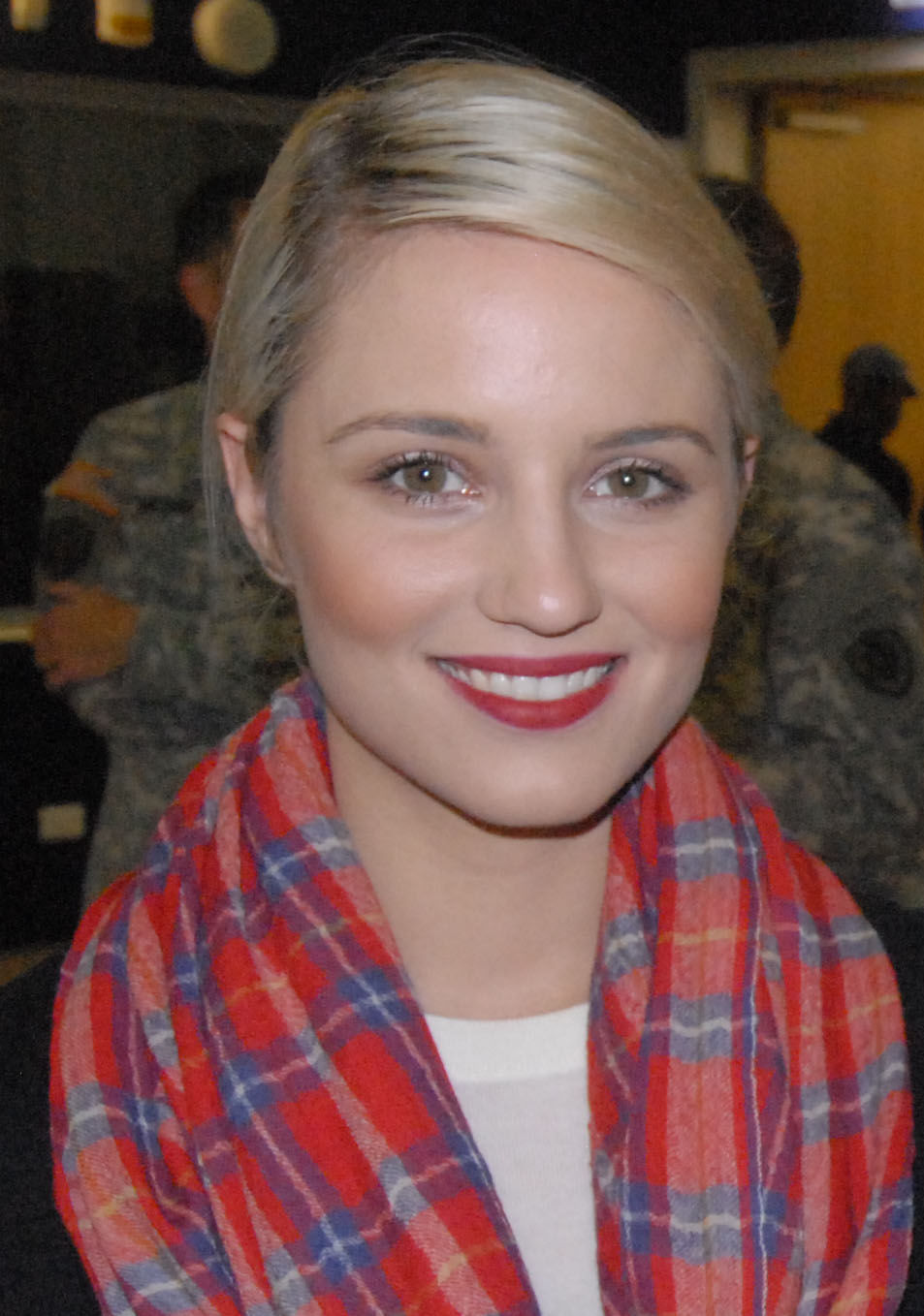
Quinn's (Agron, pictured) post-accident return evoked a range of reactions

Quinn's storyline received widely divergent commentary. Hankinson thought the writers had missed an opportunity to "do something hugely daring" and also reduce the size of the cast. Raymund Flandez of The Wall Street Journal characterized their message as "Move on, folks, nothing to see here", added that "there wasn’t even a scratch on her face" and concluded that it was "nice to know that touches of irony haven’t left the show". Strecker called Quinn "a walking wheeling PSA about texting dangers in general". Dodge said that one of his "favorite scenes" of the episode was "when Artie tries to get Quinn to wheel herself up a steep ramp outside McKinley". VanDerWerff noted the pair's "chemistry" as friends, and Rolling Stone's Erica Futterman described "Quinn's kids-in-wheelchairs bonding scenes with Artie" as the "second best thing about the episode". Michael Slezak of TVLine expressed the wish that the extras in the scene in the skateboard park "had actually gotten a chance to, um, speak like real humans, not just like props for a kicky musical number". VanDerWerff's summation was that the episode "gave Dianna Agron more shades to play than she’s usually asked to, and that was a good thing".

While Sue's pregnancy storyline continued to be unpopular with some reviewers, Bell included, the discovery that her daughter might have Down syndrome and her telling Becky about it led Bell to state that she had "always felt that the relationship between Sue and Becky was one of Glee's finest accomplishments". Strecker noted that "their scenes together are always some of my favorites", and commended the episode's "poignant heart-to-heart"—which Dodge also praised as "very touching"—where Becky gave Sue the advice to "work on her patience". VanDerWerff thought that Sue's storyline was one of several in the episode beyond the two main ones—Blaine and Cooper's conflict and Quinn's post-accident return—that the show "kept piling" on, to its detriment. Another, described by MTV's Kevin Sullivan as "silly", had Puck trying to recruit Finn to clean pools with him in California.

=== Music and performances ===
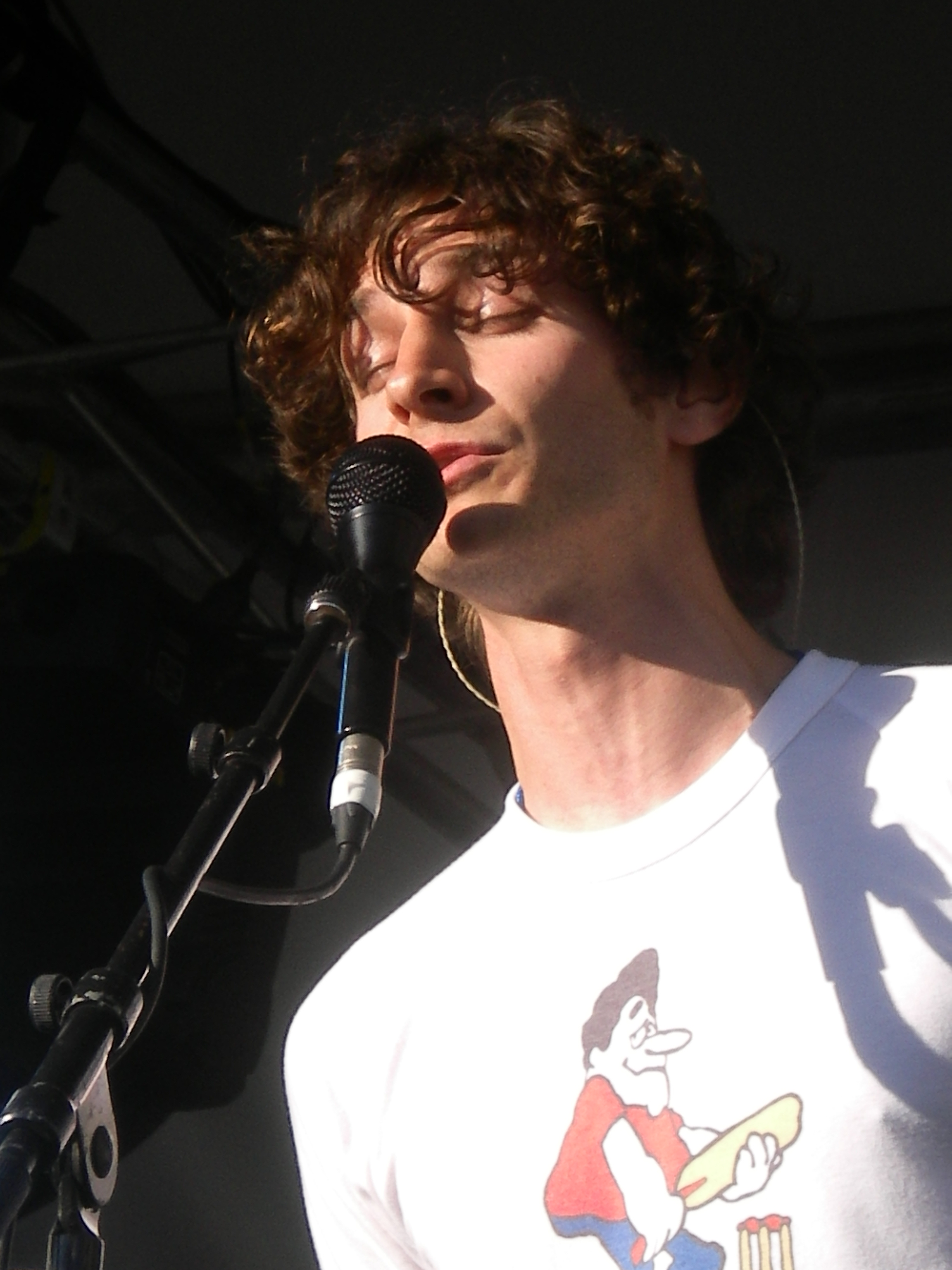
The show's rendition of "Somebody That I Used to Know" by Gotye (pictured) was lauded by many reviewers

The musical performances were given a middling to positive response overall, and the final song, "Somebody That I Used to Know", received the most enthusiastic reception. Bell called it the "highlight of the episode", and it was Hankinson's favorite performance: "Bomer and Criss did a fantastic job bringing it to life". Futterman said that "it was initially disconcerting to envision" two brothers singing about a "former love", but she noted that it "was less weird in context". Flandez felt that with the song's conversion to a "Cain-and-Abel therapy session", despite being "gorgeously sung", it was nevertheless "the most disappointing duet ever", but Slezak gave the performance an "A−", and wrote, "I bought the sibling angst in the room, and Matt Bomer really is a charismatic fella, no?" Strecker gave the song an "A" and stated, "Shout-out to the Glee writers this episode for not only picking fun songs, but also tracks that were all really great lyrically in terms of moving the plot forward."

Gotye was initially reported to have been unimpressed with the Glee rendition of his song, but later stated that his words had been taken out of context. On April 22, 2012, two Australian newspapers, the Sunday Mail and the Sunday Herald Sun, quoted him as having said, "They did such a faithful arrangement of the instrumentals but the vocals were that pop Glee style". The Mail's quote continued after a comma with "ultra-dry, sounded pretty tuned and the rock has no real sense, like it's playing to you from a cardboard box." The Herald Sun's continuation of the quote came after a period: "It made it sound dinky and wrong." Gotye said in an interview the next day that he had been referring to "this xylophone hook in my song—it's kind of dinky not just in the cover version but the original song". He added, "I thought it was really clever to transpose the song to two guys ... It was a great idea." In an interview published ten days later, Glee's executive music producer Adam Anders said that although the iTunes version of the song that the show released was "very true" to Gotye's, that in the episode itself, "the reality is, it was drier".

The two songs performed by Artie and Quinn were not reviewed as enthusiastically. Both Futterman and Slezak approved of the harmonies in "I'm Still Standing", though Futterman thought the number felt "more subdued than we'd expect", and Slezak wrote that "the song choice was a little bit of a groaner" before he appended a "B" grade. Chaney gave the song a "C" and said that "something about this segment wasn’t as dynamic as it should have been". Votta and Strecker both described the performance as "pleasant", the latter also added a "B−" grade. Strecker gave a "B" to the other song, "Up Up Up", which she said was "mostly background music" and the song itself "not particularly memorable". Chaney's "B" was far more complimentary: she characterized the performance as "the most energetic set piece of the night" which "made nice use of the infectious Givers song". Futterman thought that "the sugary vocals work well for Artie and Quinn", but Votta wrote that "the vocal is so indistinct it could be anyone".

The other performance by Criss and Bomer, the Duran Duran mashup of "Hungry Like the Wolf" and "Rio", was given a modestly positive reception. Strecker gave it an "A−" and called it a "real treat" with "some truly fun choreography". Slezak, on the other hand, described the choreography as "peculiar", and graded the song a "B". Sullivan wrote, "On paper it may not have seemed like the best idea, but honestly, it kind of rocked." Chaney noted that "they were fun to watch", but gave the performance a "C"; she said that "something about this cover sucked all the cherry ice cream smile out of the originals", though she wondered whether she was biased by her "lifelong appreciation of Duran Duran". The solo by Criss on "Fighter" received a wider range of opinions. Both Chaney and Slezak gave the song a "B−": Chaney said he sang the song "with conviction" and complimented the "visually alluring" boxing and shower scenes, as did Slezak. Strecker wrote that "the energy and emotional punch totally resonated" and gave the song an "A−", though she also stated that "the talk-singing at the beginning was a little weird". Votta said that "vocally, Darren Criss embodies the song", but she characterized the staging as "too jagged and haphazard to make an impact", and the transitions not "as smooth as they could be". Flandez called the song choice "unsuitable" and "puzzling", and VanDerWerff said the performance was "completely ridiculous".

=== Chart history ===
Of the five singles released for the episode, three debuted on North American top 100 charts. "Somebody That I Used to Know" sold 152,000 digital downloads in the US, and was number 26 on the Billboard Hot 100. One other single charted on the Hot 100: the mashup of "Hungry Like the Wolf" and "Rio", which debuted at number 98. "Fighter" did not enter the Billboard Hot 100, but peaked at number two on the Bubbling Under Hot 100 Singles chart. Three songs charted on the Billboard Canadian Hot 100: "Somebody That I Used to Know" debuted at number 21, "Hungry Like the Wolf / Rio" at number 81, and "Fighter" at number 85.

The same week as the Glee single charted, "Somebody That I Used to Know" moved from second to first on the US Billboard Hot 100—it had already been at number one in Canada—selling 542,000 copies in a single week, the fourth-highest ever weekly digital sales to that point. Sales were aided by the Glee performance and also by Gotye and Kimbra's performance of the song on Saturday Night Live at the end of the week.
