= Glee season 3 =

2011–12 season of American musical comedy-drama

Glee
- Season 3
- Promotional poster and home media cover art
- Starring: Dianna Agron; Chris Colfer; Darren Criss; Jane Lynch; Jayma Mays; Kevin McHale; Lea Michele; Cory Monteith; Heather Morris; Matthew Morrison; Amber Riley; Naya Rivera; Mark Salling; Harry Shum, Jr.; Jenna Ushkowitz
- No. of episodes: 22

Release
- Original network: Fox
- Original release: September 20, 2011 – May 22, 2012

Season chronology
- ← Previous; Season 2 Next → Season 4

The third season of the musical comedy-drama television series Glee was commissioned on May 23, 2010, by Fox while the first season aired. It aired between September 20, 2011, and May 22, 2012, and was produced by 20th Century Fox Television and Ryan Murphy Television, with executive producers Dante Di Loreto and series co-creators Ryan Murphy, Brad Falchuk and Ian Brennan.

The series features the New Directions glee club at the fictional William McKinley High School in the town of Lima, Ohio. Season three follows the club competing on the show choir circuit, while its members and faculty deal with sex, sexual identity, gender identity, stress, domestic violence, teenage suicide, pregnancy, disabilities, texting while driving, outing and other social issues. The central characters are glee club director Will Schuester (Matthew Morrison), cheerleading coach Sue Sylvester (Jane Lynch), guidance counselor Emma Pillsbury (Jayma Mays), and glee club members Artie Abrams (Kevin McHale), Blaine Anderson (Darren Criss), Rachel Berry (Lea Michele), Mike Chang (Harry Shum Jr.), Tina Cohen-Chang (Jenna Ushkowitz), Quinn Fabray (Dianna Agron), Finn Hudson (Cory Monteith), Kurt Hummel (Chris Colfer), Mercedes Jones (Amber Riley), Santana Lopez (Naya Rivera), Brittany Pierce (Heather Morris) and Noah "Puck" Puckerman (Mark Salling). At the end of the season, eight members of the glee club graduate: Rachel, Mike, Quinn, Finn, Kurt, Mercedes, Santana and Puck.

Jessalyn Gilsig (Terri Schuester) and Mike O'Malley (Burt Hummel) are dropped from the main cast, with Gilsig already being written out in the previous season, and O'Malley made a recurring cast member again for the remainder of the series. At the same time, this is the final season to feature Agron and Mays as regular cast members.

The season was nominated for three Emmy Awards, one Golden Globe Award for Best Television Series - Comedy or Musical and one Screen Actors Guild Award for Outstanding Performance by an Ensemble in a Comedy Series.

== Production ==
The series is produced by 20th Century Fox Television, Ryan Murphy Television and Brad Falchuk Teley-Vision. Series creators Ian Brennan, Brad Falchuk and Ryan Murphy serve as executive producers, alongside Dante Di Loreto. This constitutes a promotion for Brennan, who formerly received a co-executive producer credit. The first and second seasons were written exclusively by Brennan, Falchuk and Murphy. Although Murphy had intended to hire a team of five or six writers in January 2010, this plan was delayed, due to the existing team's reluctance to alter a working formula. Falchuk revealed in May 2011 that further writing staff are being sought to bring "fresh voices" to the series: "We're trying to get a lot of quirky people and interesting people and people that are not what you'd expect." Six new writers were confirmed, and began work on June 20, 2011: Ali Adler (also co-executive producer), Roberto Aguirre-Sacasa (also co-producer), Marti Noxon and former first-season guest star Michael Hitchcock (who are serving as consulting producers), and staff writers Matthew Hodgson and Ross Maxwell.

The third season was structured with two "mini-seasons" mimicking the two high school semesters. While the previous two seasons have included multiple tribute episodes, dedicated to artists such as Madonna and Britney Spears, the musical The Rocky Horror Picture Show, and the album Rumours by Fleetwood Mac, Murphy intended to feature just one such tribute in season three, in the form of a two-hour television movie; Falchuk was less definite about the number or format, saying only that if there was a tribute episode, it would be "in the second half of the season". It was revealed in early December that the tribute episode would feature ten to twelve of Michael Jackson's songs, and the episode was scheduled for January 31, 2012. However, in mid-January 2012, Murphy revealed that there would be an April episode centered on the Saturday Night Fever soundtrack by The Bee Gees. Filming for the season was originally reported as beginning on August 10, 2011, but it began on August 9. The first episode of the season was directed by Eric Stoltz, and Matthew Morrison made his directing debut on the Christmas episode.

Broadcast began on September 20, 2011, in the US, where Glee airs on Fox in the 8 pm timeslot on Tuesdays. It debuted in Australia on September 21, 2011, at 8:30 pm on Network Ten, hours after the US broadcast. In the UK, the show moved from E4 to Sky1, and premiered on September 22, 2011, two days after the US. Both Network Ten and Sky1 later decoupled their broadcasts from the American schedules. Network Ten did so after the sixth episode, "Mash Off", and Sky1 announced after airing the ninth episode, "Extraordinary Merry Christmas", that in 2012 they would air all the remaining episodes in an unbroken weekly run, scheduled so that the final episodes of the season would broadcast "within days" of their initial American premiere. A subsequent change in the US schedule required adding a week's break after the fourteenth episode, "On My Way".

The cast began recording for their musical numbers on the show beginning on August 8, 2011. They also began recording material for a new Glee Christmas album that month.

== Episodes ==
No. overall	No. in season	Title	Directed by	Written by	Original release date	Prod. code	US viewers (millions)
45	1	"The Purple Piano Project"	Eric Stoltz	Brad Falchuk	September 20, 2011	3ARC01	9.21
The glee club is down to ten members and needs to recruit new talent, leading Will to place several purple pianos around the school and encourage the clubs to sing whenever they see one. Quinn has quit the Cheerios and the New Directions and has befriended a group of outcast girls called the Skanks. Rachel and Kurt attend an Ohio mixer for future applicants of the New York Academy of Dramatic Arts (NYADA) but are intimidated by the performances of the other attendees. Sue runs for congress on a platform of cutting the arts in schools and directs new cheerleading co-captains Santana and Becky to sabotage the pianos being used in the glee club project. Sugar Motta, whose wealthy father donated the pianos, auditions for New Directions but cannot sing in tune. An agonized Will eventually rejects Sugar but gains a new recruit when Kurt convinces Blaine to transfer to McKinley High.
46	2	"I Am Unicorn"	Brad Falchuk	Ryan Murphy	September 27, 2011	3ARC02	8.60
Will sets up a boot camp for some of the members of the glee club to improve their dancing. Auditions begin for the school musical, West Side Story with Kurt and Blaine pitted against each other for the part of Tony. Kurt worries he's "too gay" to play any big roles on Broadway, but Burt encourages him to be himself. Kurt also begins his campaign for senior class president. Sue features Quinn in an anti-arts commercial for her congressional campaign; Will reprimands Quinn and tells her to grow up. Shelby Corcoran is hired by Sugar's father to set up a rival glee club at McKinley High; she allows Puck to see Beth, but rejects Quinn's desire to do likewise due to her rebellious behavior and appearance. Quinn resumes her normal appearance and returns to the New Directions; Puck tells Quinn he is proud of her, but Quinn reveals she is only pretending to behave in order to pursue full custody of Beth.
47	3	"Asian F"	Alfonso Gomez-Rejon	Ian Brennan	October 4, 2011	3ARC03	8.42
After Mike gets an "A−" on a chemistry test, his father wants him to drop glee club and break up with Tina. He instead auditions for West Side Story. Mercedes also auditions but refuses to share the role of Maria with Rachel when the two are to be double-cast. Angry about what she perceives as continued favoritism towards Rachel, Mercedes quits the New Directions and joins Shelby's rival glee club. Brittany's campaign for senior class president kicks into high gear, and Rachel becomes a third candidate to improve her college prospects, infuriating Kurt. Will is insecure about his relationship with Emma because she hasn't asked him to meet her parents and secretly invites them to dinner; the return of Emma's parents causes a severe flare-up of her OCD. The musical's cast list is posted, with Blaine and Rachel receiving the lead roles as Tony and Maria, and Mike receiving the role of Riff.
48	4	"Pot o' Gold"	Adam Shankman	Ali Adler	November 1, 2011	3ARC04	7.47
Irish exchange student Rory Flanagan arrives at McKinley High. He is living at Brittany's house, and she thinks that he is a leprechaun. Mercedes starts recruiting for Shelby's new glee club, the Troubletones, and succeeds in attracting Santana and Brittany, who are now officially dating. Quinn babysits Beth and secretly hides items around Shelby's house to make her look like an unfit mother; she subsequently calls Child Protective Services, after which Puck returns to secretly gather up the items. Puck comforts Shelby, who confesses she is extremely lonely; the two kiss. Sue campaigns to rescind the budget of the school's West Side Story production, leading Burt to run against her as a write-in candidate. Rory joins New Directions.
49	5	"The First Time"	Bradley Buecker	Roberto Aguirre-Sacasa	November 8, 2011	3ARC05	6.91
The school musical West Side Story is rehearsed with Artie as lead director; Artie tells Rachel and Blaine that they are not conveying enough emotion, and questions whether they can convincingly portray their roles if they are still virgins. Kurt and Blaine then debate whether to have sex, as do Rachel and Finn, the latter of whom is worried about being recruited for college football. Mike is disowned by his father after he confesses that he wants to be a professional dancer. Coach Beiste gains an admirer in the form of football recruiter Cooter Menkins. New Dalton Academy Warbler Sebastian Smythe makes a play for Blaine and invites him and Kurt to a gay bar; Kurt runs into Dave Karofsky, who has transferred to another school. On opening night, Rachel reminds Blaine that they both have found their soulmates in Finn and Kurt; they are later shown having their first sexual encounters with their respective soulmates.
50	6	"Mash Off"	Eric Stoltz	Michael Hitchcock	November 15, 2011	3ARC06	7.08
Sue pursues a smear campaign against Burt in their congressional race. Puck falls in love with Shelby, but she rejects the idea of a relationship. Puck also informs Shelby of Quinn's true intentions, after which Shelby refuses to let Quinn in Beth's life. The candidates for senior class president debate, and Rachel withdraws from the race, throwing her support behind Kurt. Will and Shelby encourage some friendly competition between their clubs, but Santana does not go along with the friendly part and hounds Finn. In response, Finn publicly tells her to come out of the closet and criticizes her for tearing others down while not accepting herself. Santana is later told by Sue and Burt that the niece of one of their opponents in the election overheard Finn and is releasing an attack ad criticizing Sue for choosing a lesbian as head cheerleader. Santana blames Finn for outing her and slaps him in the face.
51	7	"I Kissed a Girl"	Tate Donovan	Matthew Hodgson	November 29, 2011	3ARC07	7.90
In an effort to combat allegations that she is a lesbian, Sue decides to start an arbitrary relationship with a man and chooses Cooter, who is struggling to connect with Coach Beiste. Beiste tells Sue that she won't give him up without a fight, and Sue ends up losing the election to Burt. Shelby and Puck have sex, but she rejects it and asks him to leave. Santana comes out to her parents and the school with the help of the New Directions and Troubletones, but when she tells her grandmother, she denounces Santana and tells her to never return. The election for McKinley High Senior Class President is marred by ballot-box stuffing, and Brittany is declared the winner. Rachel confesses that she was the one who committed election fraud; she is suspended for a week and banned from participating in the upcoming Sectionals competition.
52	8	"Hold On to Sixteen"	Bradley Buecker	Ross Maxwell	December 6, 2011	3ARC08	7.11
Rachel and Finn travel to Kentucky to convince Sam Evans to return to McKinley High and New Directions, during which they discover that Sam is working as a stripper. Meanwhile, Quinn tries to get Shelby fired for sleeping with Puck; Rachel insists that Quinn will ruin Beth's life if she takes her from Shelby, who later reveals that she is resigning from McKinley. Blaine confronts Finn for dismissing his suggestions in glee club; Finn admits he is jealous of Blaine's talent and they reconcile. The New Directions win Sectionals, and the Troubletones come in second; Mike's father watches the performance and reconciles with Mike, understanding that dancing is Mike's passion. Quinn decides not to reveal Shelby's secret for Beth's sake and convinces Will to feature the Troubletones members in all future New Directions competition if they agree to be in the group, after which the Troubletones agree to join New Directions.
53	9	"Extraordinary Merry Christmas"	Matthew Morrison	Marti Noxon	December 13, 2011	3ARC09	7.13
Will announces that New Directions has been asked to create a holiday special for a local network, with Artie as lead director. Sue recruits the glee club to sing at a homeless shelter where she will be volunteering, but the glee club members decide to do the broadcast when they discover that both events take place on the exact same day. Rory suffers from homesickness and bonds with Sam, who is also away from his family. Rachel gives Finn a long list of Christmas present suggestions, but Finn instead surprises her with the donation of a sow in her name. After performing the holiday special, the New Directions arrive at the homeless shelter with more food and presents.
54	10	"Yes/No"	Eric Stoltz	Brad Falchuk	January 17, 2012	3ARC10	7.50
Sam joins McKinley's synchronized swim team, coached by Roz Washington, desperate for a letterman jacket to impress Mercedes, who he wants to win back from her boyfriend Shane. Becky decides she wants Artie as her boyfriend and gets him to date her. Artie asks Sue for advice on how to break off the relationship; Sue advises him to treat Becky like anyone else and tell her directly. Finn decides to enlist in the army as an obligation to his late father. Carole later reveals that she hid from him the fact that his father did not die in Iraq, but died from a drug overdose in Cincinnati after being discharged. Finn is distraught by the news and discusses his future with Rachel. After learning that Beiste and Cooter have eloped, Emma begins to fantasize about Will proposing marriage; Will enlists the glee club and the swim team's help in a spontaneous marriage proposal, which Emma tearfully accepts. Finn later surprises Rachel with a proposal of marriage.
55	11	"Michael"	Alfonso Gomez-Rejon	Ryan Murphy	January 31, 2012	3ARC11	9.07
Will announces a Michael Jackson week after the former Troubletones reveal they are disappointed they didn't get to perform in the Jackson family medley at Sectionals. Blaine mentions the possibility of performing Jackson's music at Regionals to Sebastian, who later announces that the Warblers will also be performing Jackson's music. New Directions challenges the Warblers for the right to perform Jackson, and they meet in a parking garage. Sebastian throws a slushie at Kurt, but Blaine interposes himself; he is badly injured and needs eye surgery. Santana records Sebastian confessing to rigging the slushie with rock salt. Finn asks Rachel for her answer to his proposal, but she is not ready to make a decision. Sam and Mercedes kiss. Quinn discovers that she has been accepted at Yale, while Kurt and Rachel discover that they are both finalists for admission at NYADA.
56	12	"The Spanish Teacher"	Paris Barclay	Ian Brennan	February 7, 2012	3ARC12	7.81
Will and Sue are competing for a tenured position at McKinley High, but complaints are received about both of them as teachers. Will goes to night school for a refresher course in Spanish, but his teacher there, David Martinez, becomes a potential rival for his position at McKinley when Will assigns a Spanish-themed week to New Directions and invites David to perform. Will arranges with Figgins to become the new history teacher, while proposing David to be his replacement as the Spanish teacher. Meanwhile, Sue clashes with Roz, who is also pursuing the tenured position and plans to replace Sue on the Cheerios. Rachel tells Kurt and Mercedes that Finn has proposed to her; Kurt believes Finn is considering marriage because he has given up too early on his own dreams. Mercedes is torn between her feelings for Sam and Shane. Sue announces that she wants to become a mother, and she needs a sperm donor.
57	13	"Heart"	Brad Falchuk	Ali Adler	February 14, 2012	3ARC13	6.99
Will assigns the members of New Directions to perform the best love songs for Valentine's Day. Sugar holds a Valentine's dance for McKinley students, which Santana and Brittany attend as a couple; Artie and Rory compete to become Sugar's date. Rachel and Finn reveal their marriage plans to New Directions. Burt, Carole and Rachel's fathers pretend to act supportive, and Rachel and Finn decide to get married even sooner than planned. The members of McKinley's Christian club debate the morality of homosexuality when Santana hires them to perform a singing telegram for Brittany. Mercedes breaks up with Shane but decides not to date Sam, as she wants to be sure of her own feelings. Kurt starts receiving Valentine's gifts from a secret admirer, whom he later discovers is from Karofsky. Kurt lets him down gently, but their parting words are overheard by a classmate of Karofsky's.
58	14	"On My Way"	Bradley Buecker	Roberto Aguirre-Sacasa	February 21, 2012	3ARC14	7.46
The New Directions prepare to compete against the Dalton Academy Warblers, whom they defeated the previous year. Dave Karofsky tries to commit suicide after his classmates find out he is gay and post hate threats on his social media accounts. The news spreads throughout McKinley; the faculty considers how they could have done more to help him, while Kurt blames himself for ignoring Karofsky's phone calls. In light of the recent news about Karofsky, Will advises the glee club members to think of their future, after which Rachel and Finn decide to get married the day after Regionals. Sue reveals that she is pregnant. The New Directions win Regionals, with the Warblers finishing second. As their wedding ceremony is about to begin, Rachel is reluctant to start without Quinn, who is picking up her bridemaid's dress. Rachel texts Quinn to find out where she is; Quinn responds to the text when a truck suddenly crashes into the driver's seat of her car.
59	15	"Big Brother"	Eric Stoltz	Michael Hitchcock	April 10, 2012	3ARC15	6.76
Quinn returns to school in a wheelchair, suffering from a severely compressed spine, but hopes to regain the use of her legs. Figgins informs Sue that Roz is now her cheerleading co-coach; Sue proposes that if she helps New Directions win the Nationals show choir competition, she can regain sole control of the Cheerios. Blaine's older brother Cooper Anderson, a television ad actor, comes to Lima for a visit. Cooper gives an acting masterclass to New Directions, but Blaine is put off when Cooper criticizes his singing and acting skills. Emma and Will accompany Sue to her doctor's appointment, during which they discover that Sue's baby has Down syndrome. When the members of the glee club do a "senior ditch day" at Six Flags, Quinn and Artie instead go to a skate park designed for people with disabilities. Quinn is later assisted by fellow "God Squad" member Joe Hart, whom she invites to join New Directions.
60	16	"Saturday Night Glee-ver"	Bradley Buecker	Matthew Hodgson	April 17, 2012	3ARC16	6.23
Wade Adams, a member of rival glee club Vocal Adrenaline, asks Kurt and Mercedes for advice about whether to perform as his transgender alter ego "Unique". The glee club does disco in a tribute to Saturday Night Fever. In order to help Finn, Santana and Mercedes figure out what to do after they graduate, Will assigns them to perform songs from the movie that would show how they feel about their lives. Finn decides to become an actor and enrolls in the Actors Studio in New York City. After her performance, Mercedes says she wants to become a recording artist; Sam posts a videoclip of that performance, which gets excellent reviews. Santana wants to become famous, but reconsiders when Brittany uploads a sex tape of the two of them on the web. Sue gives Santana a letter from one of the top college cheerleading programs offering her a full scholarship, revealing that it was Brittany's idea.
61	17	"Dance with Somebody"	Paris Barclay	Ross Maxwell	April 24, 2012	3ARC17	6.90
After realizing the kids are still dejected over the death of Whitney Houston, Will makes their assignment for the week a tribute to Houston. Kurt bonds with a guy he meets in a music store, and they start texting each other; Kurt sees the exchanges as innocent, but Blaine views it as cheating. Blaine later reveals to Emma that he is deeply distressed at the thought of Kurt moving to New York. After Rachel and Santana sing their first duet together, Rachel asks Santana to be her friend for their final high school days. Quinn reveals to Joe that she is depressed because she has not been making progress in her physical therapy sessions; they sing a duet, and both wonder if they have feelings for each other. Will fires his wedding planner, admitting to Emma that he wants to get married before the glee club members go their separate ways; Emma assures him that no matter when they decide to get married, the glee club would be there.
62	18	"Choke"	Michael Uppendahl	Marti Noxon	May 1, 2012	3ARC18	6.01
Kurt and Rachel prepare for their audition for NYADA and are thrown off-stride when they discover they will be performing for the school's dean, Carmen Tibideaux. Carmen is impressed by Kurt's performance of "Not the Boy Next Door". Rachel sings "Don't Rain on My Parade", a song she has known well since she was a child, but she forgets the lyrics and asks for another chance. After she stumbles again on her second attempt, Carmen ends the audition. Puck realizes that he does not want to turn out like his dropout father and enlists the male glee club members to help him study. Roz overhears the New Direction girls jokingly suggesting that Beiste's black eye was given to her by her husband and lectures them for joking about domestic violence. Beiste later reveals to Sue and Roz that Cooter actually did hit her. When Sue insists that Beiste stay at her place, Beiste says she is staying with her sister, but it is later revealed that Beiste has given Cooter another chance.
63	19	"Prom-asaurus"	Eric Stoltz	Ryan Murphy	May 8, 2012	3ARC19	6.67
As class president, Brittany organizes the upcoming senior prom and decides this year's theme will be dinosaurs. Sue announces the prom king and queen finalist candidates, and Rachel is upset to discover Finn and Quinn's joint candidacy. After discussing her own misgivings about the prom with Blaine and Kurt, Rachel attempts to throw an anti-prom party at a hotel. At the prom, Finn walks in on Quinn standing up in the restroom; Finn chides Quinn for using her wheelchair to bribe votes and calls her out for being self-centered. Santana and Quinn count the prom king and queen votes; they discover that Finn has won prom king, and that Quinn has won the title of prom queen. Quinn decides to do Rachel a favor and declares Rachel as the write-in winner after Finn is announced as prom king. Finn and Rachel dance to "Take My Breath Away", and Quinn surprises the crowd by shakily standing during the performance.
64	20	"Props"	Ian Brennan	Ian Brennan	May 15, 2012	3ARC20	6.09
As the New Directions begin planning their Nationals set list, Tina is upset that Rachel continues to get all the glee club solos and walks out. Tina later falls into a fountain and strikes her head; she experiences a vision of herself as Rachel and the rest of the club with switched personas. After coming back to reality, Tina decides to help Rachel try for another NYADA audition and drives her to Carmen Tibideaux's master class in Oberlin. Carmen initially dismisses Rachel, but Tina defends Rachel and calls her "exceptional"; Rachel also invites Carmen to attend their Nationals performance. After failing an exam he needed to pass in order to graduate, Puck breaks down in front of Beiste. Beiste arranges for Puck to retake the test, promising to help him pass, and later gains enough courage to leave Cooter.
65	21	"Nationals"	Eric Stoltz	Ali Adler	May 15, 2012	3ARC21	6.03
The New Directions compete for the 2012 Nationals championship in Chicago, Illinois. Carmen arrives for the New Directions' performance, which is well received by the audience; Jesse St. James, the current director of Vocal Adrenaline, later approaches Carmen and recommends Rachel for NYADA. Mercedes and Kurt visit Wade to wish him good luck, but he tells them that he has chosen not to perform out of pressure. Kurt suggests that "Unique" might be able to handle what Wade is unable to, and Unique ultimately performs on stage with Vocal Adrenaline. Unique is awarded the Nationals MVP, but the Nationals trophy is awarded to the New Directions. Back at McKinley, the glee club members are praised by the student body, and Sue is restored as sole coach of the Cheerios, displacing Roz. Emma and Will have sex for the first time. Figgins arranges for the New Directions to perform at the school's Teacher of the Year ceremony, which is won by Will.
66	22	"Goodbye"	Brad Falchuk	Brad Falchuk	May 22, 2012	3ARC22	7.46
Will gives the New Directions members a final assignment: the underclassmen and the seniors will perform songs to say goodbye to each other. Kurt reflects on how his experience at McKinley has enabled other students to be openly gay. Mercedes is offered a recording contract in Los Angeles, Mike accepts a scholarship to the Joffrey Ballet, and Puck passes his test. Brittany discovers that she will not be graduating, and Santana, despite having a cheerleading scholarship, decides to stay in Lima. After their graduation ceremony, Finn, Kurt and Rachel open their acceptance letters. Kurt and Finn are rejected, while Rachel is admitted; she decides to defer her admission for a year so the other two can reapply and they can go to New York together. Rachel gets into Finn's car to go to their wedding, but he instead drives her to the train station, advising her to follow her dreams; he also reveals that he will be joining the Army. Will and the New Directions say goodbye to Rachel as she boards the train to New York.

== Cast ==
Glee season 3 main cast

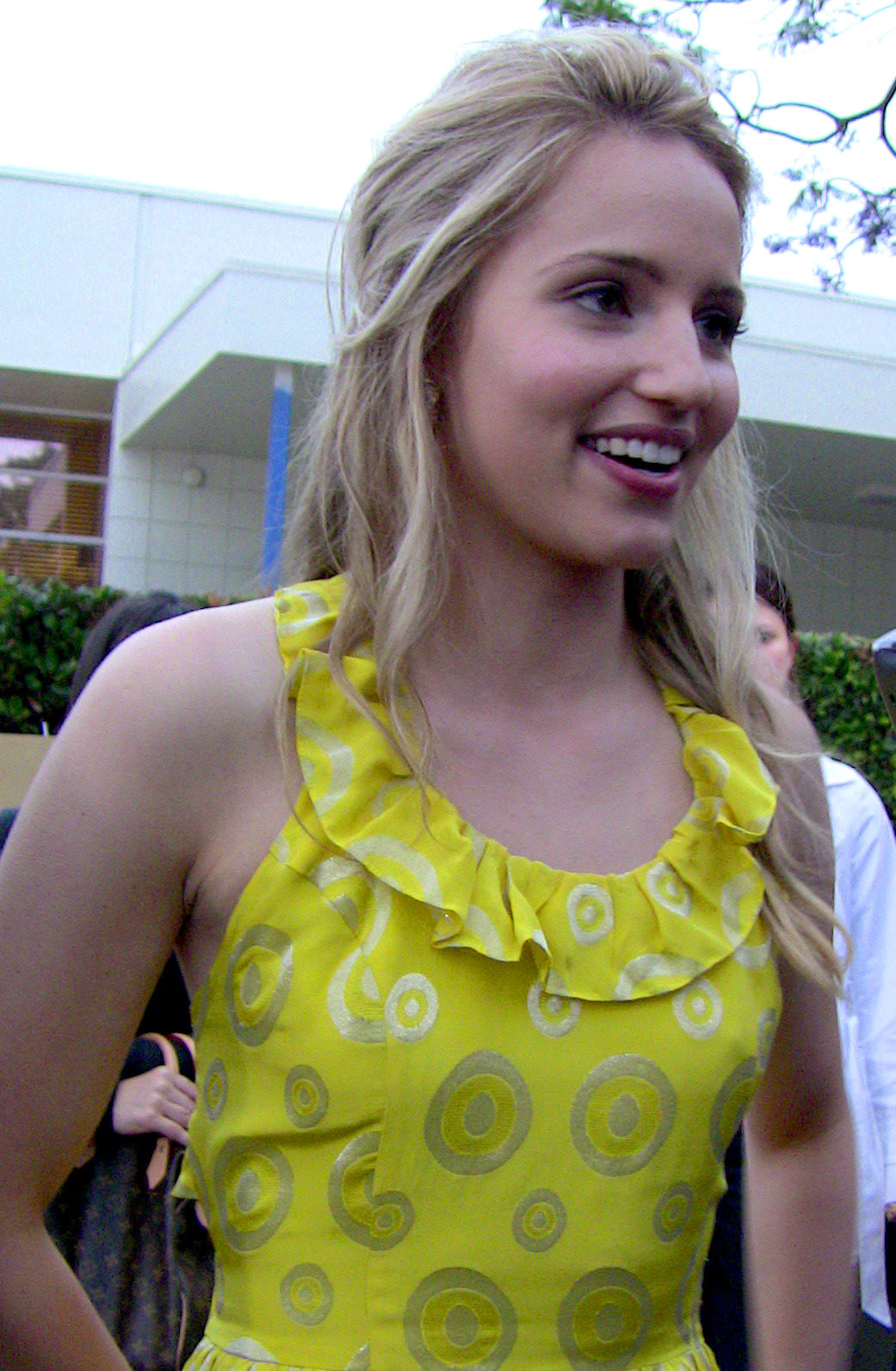
Dianna Agron

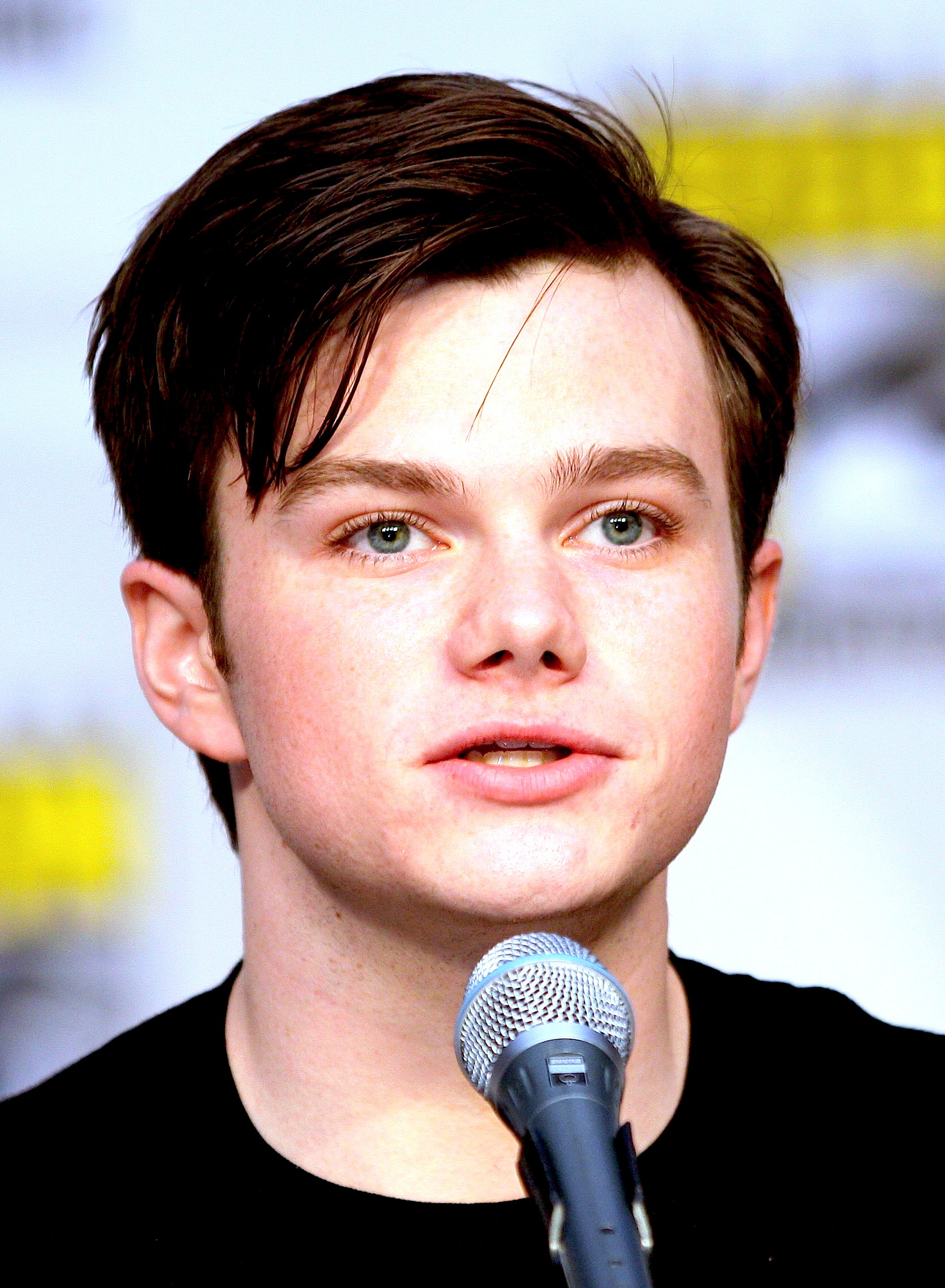
Chris Colfer

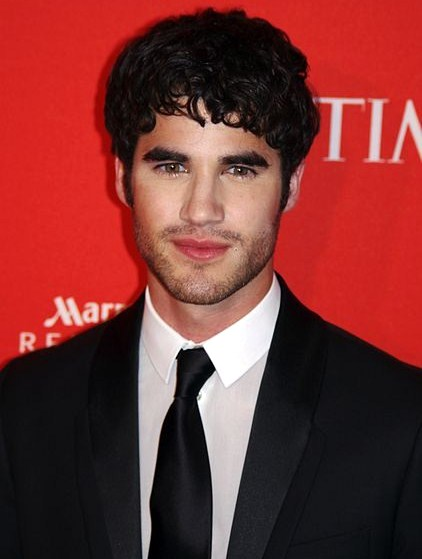
Darren Criss

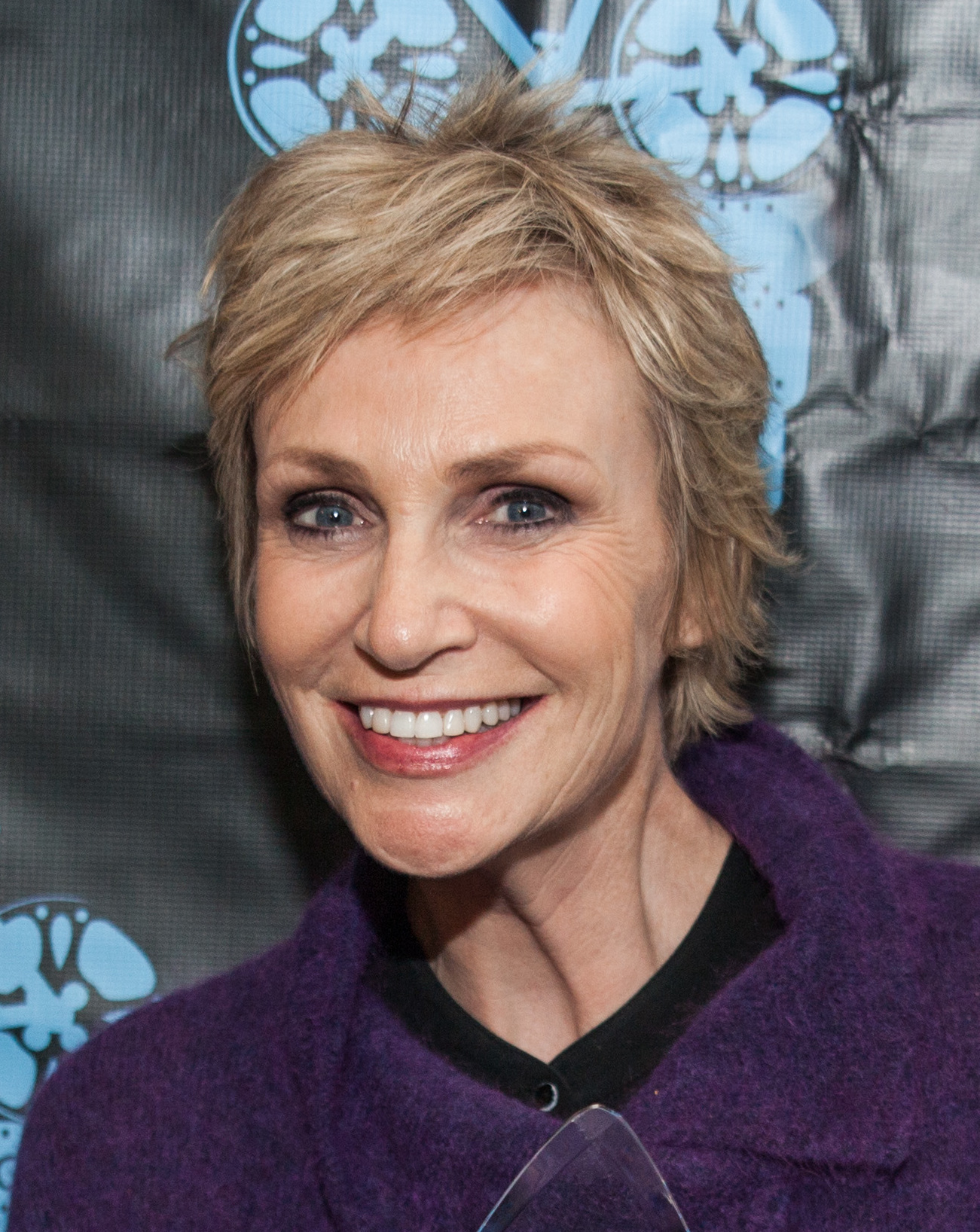
Jane Lynch

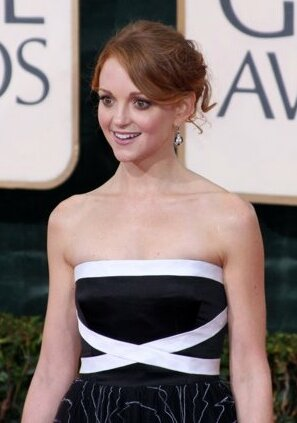
Jayma Mays

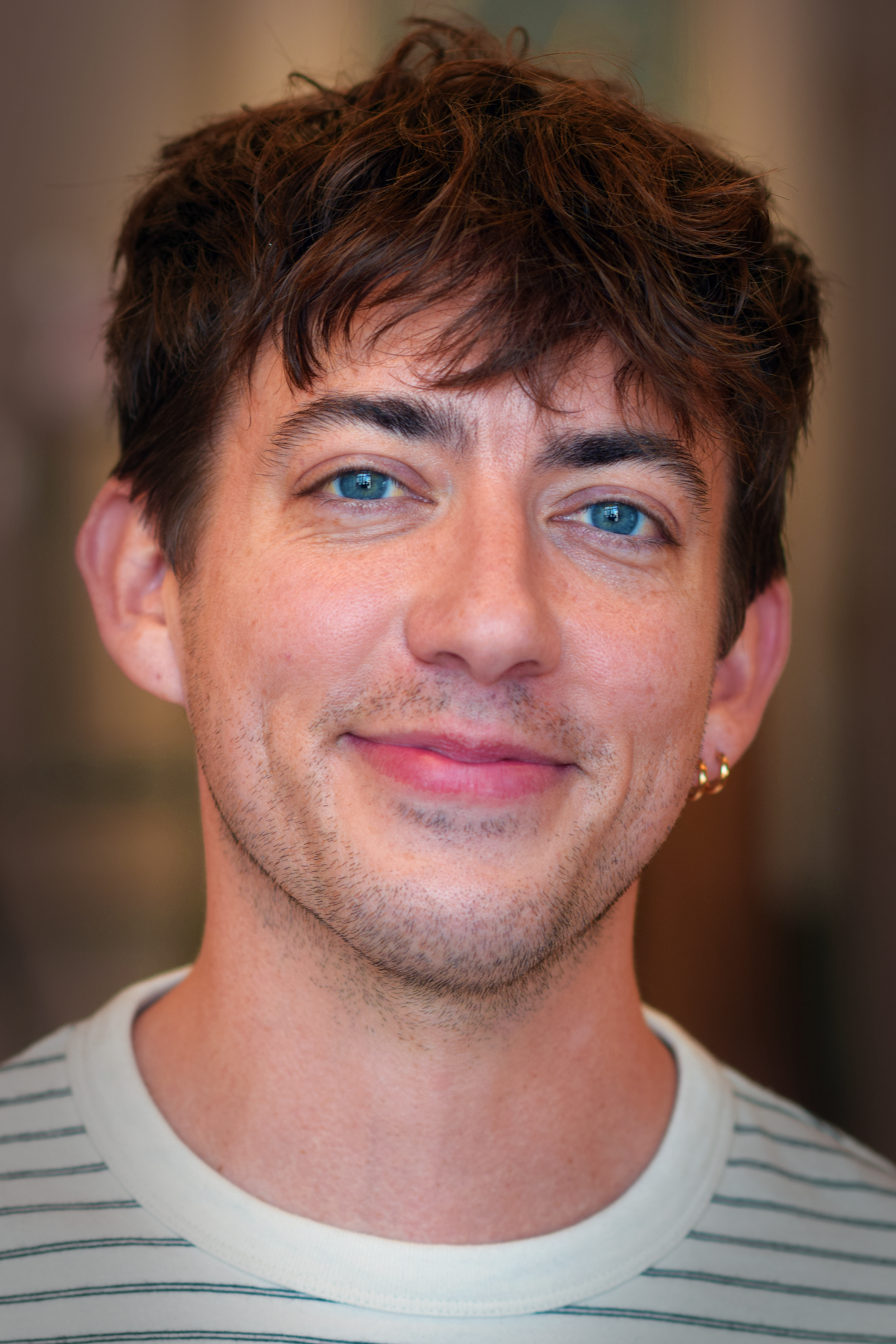
Kevin McHale

Lea Michele

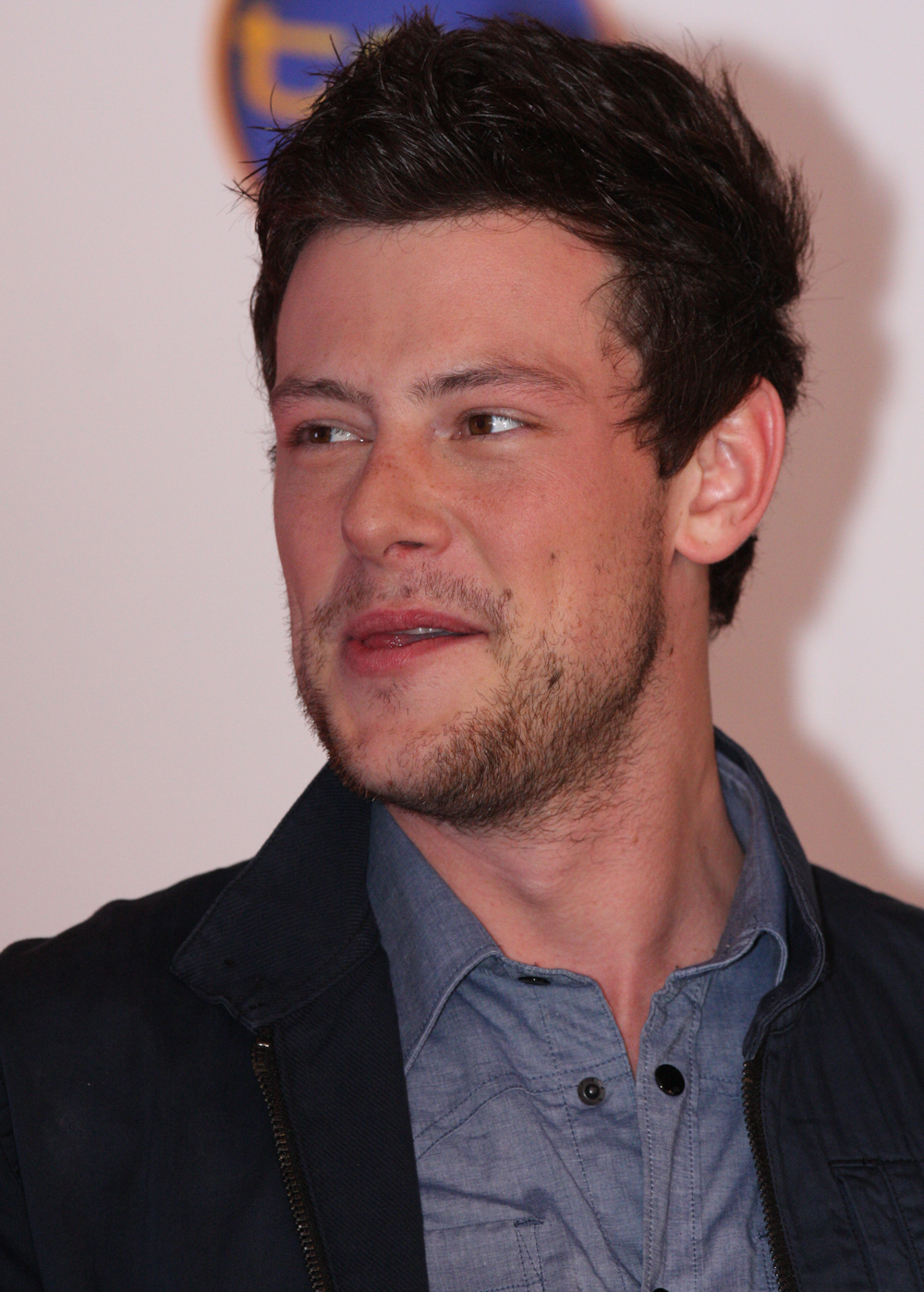
Cory Monteith

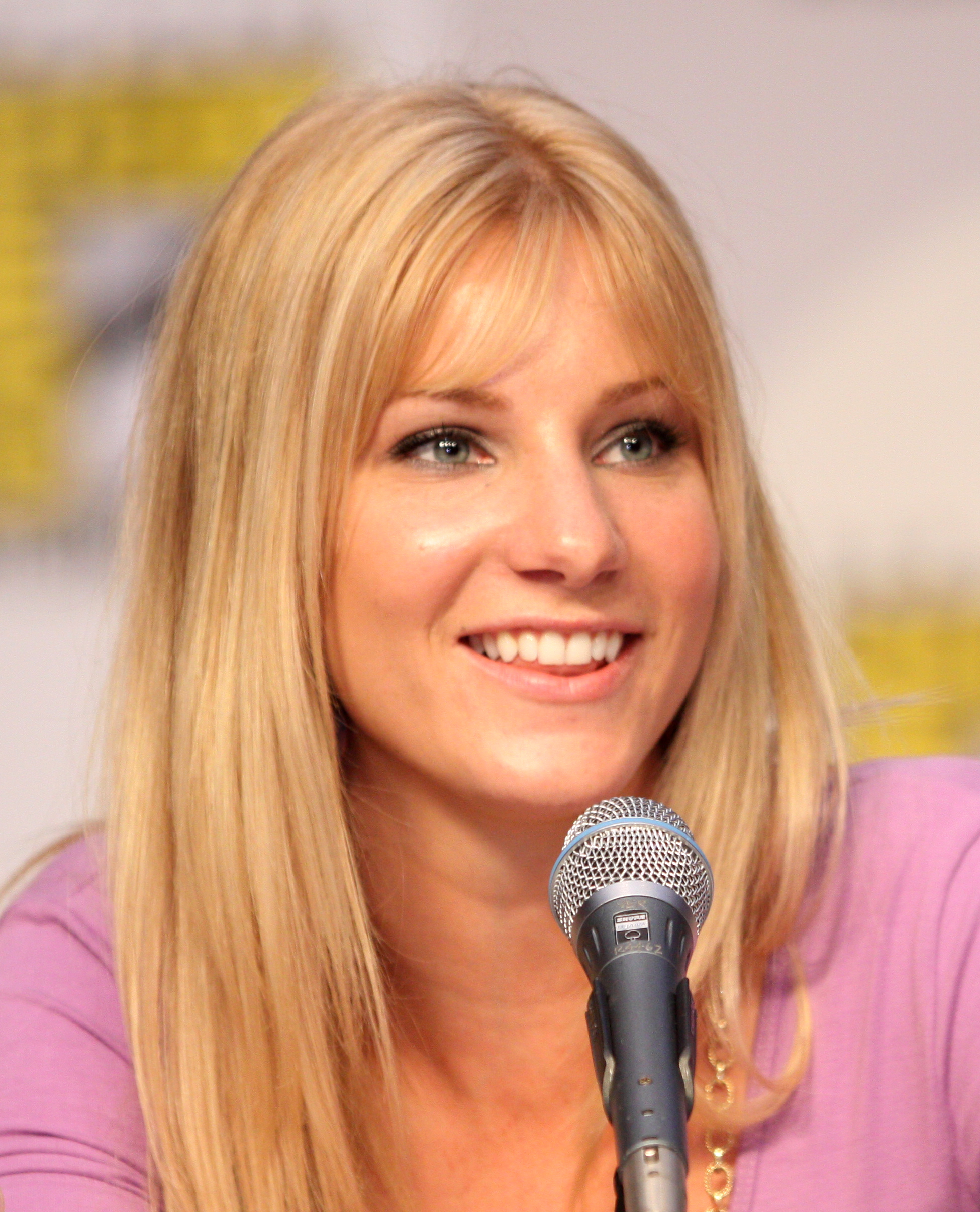
Heather Morris

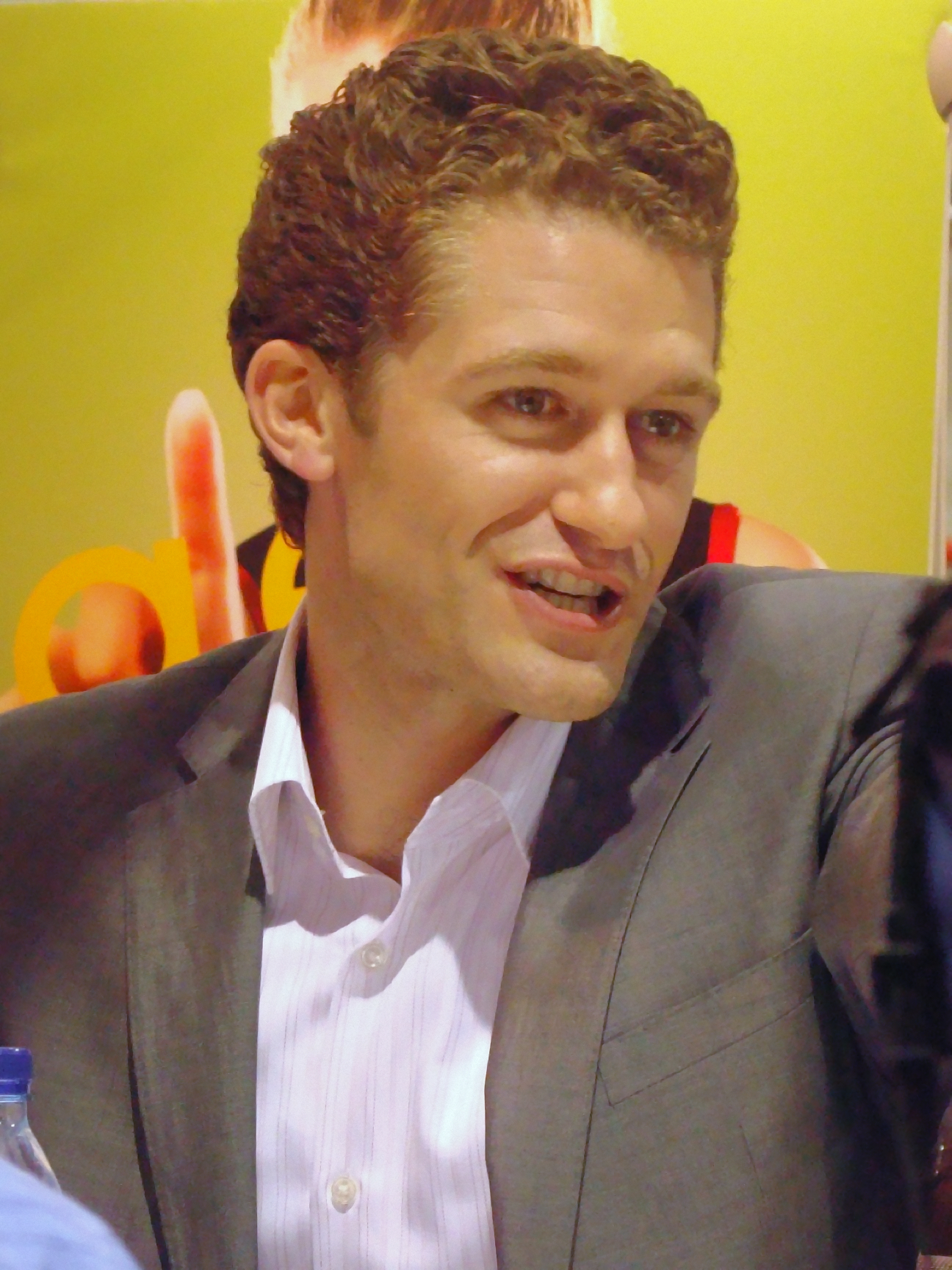
Matthew Morrison

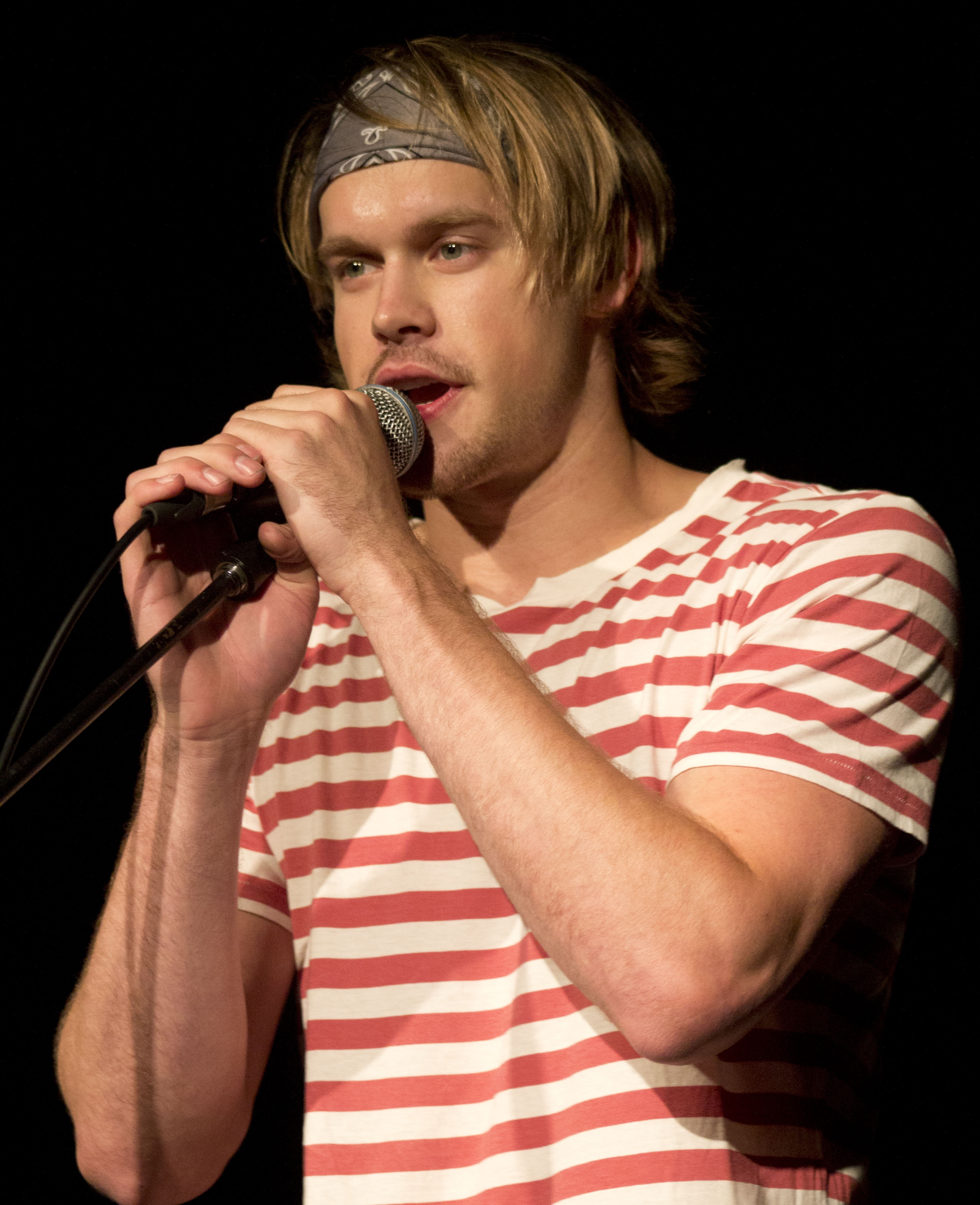
Chord Overstreet

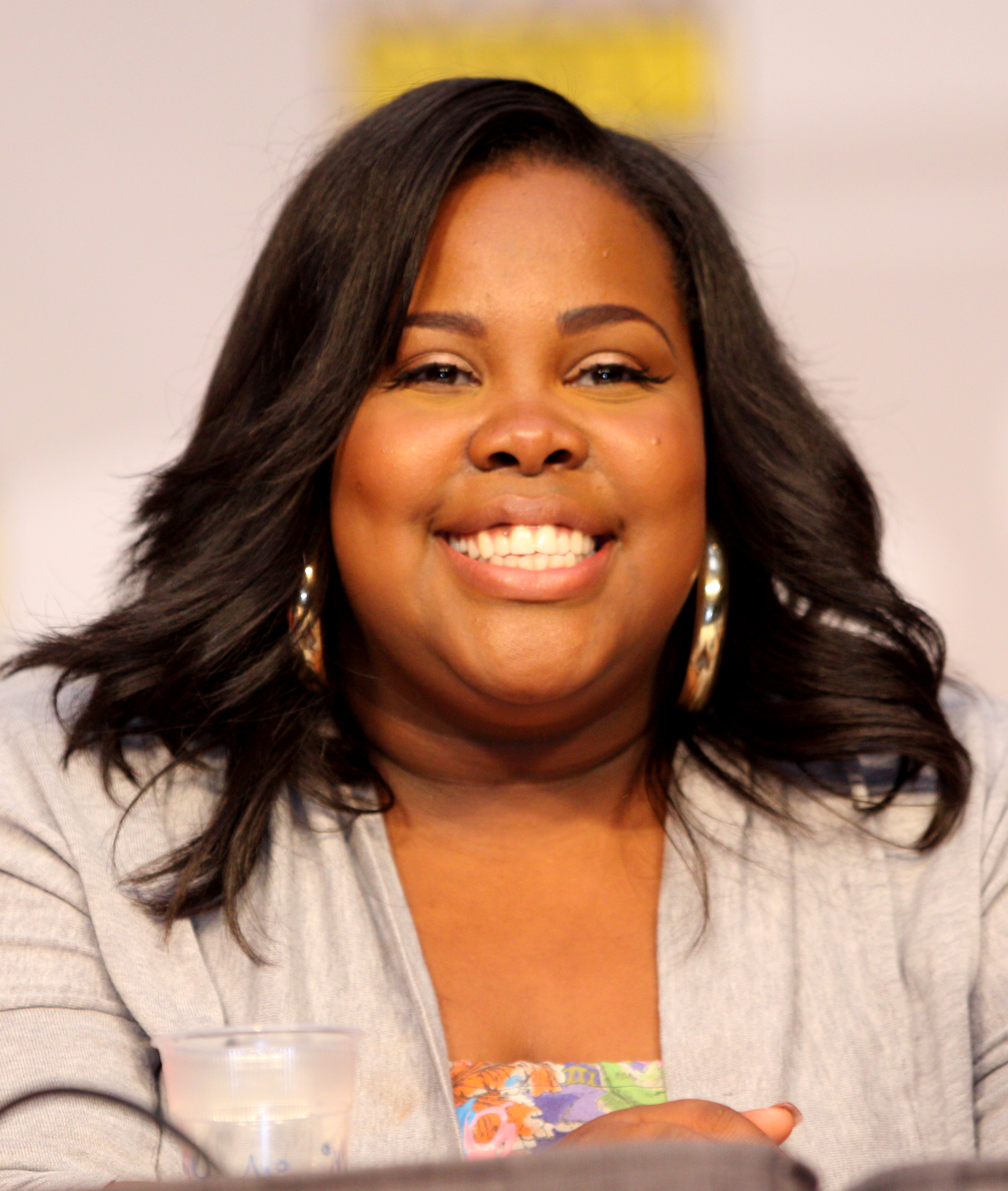
Amber Riley

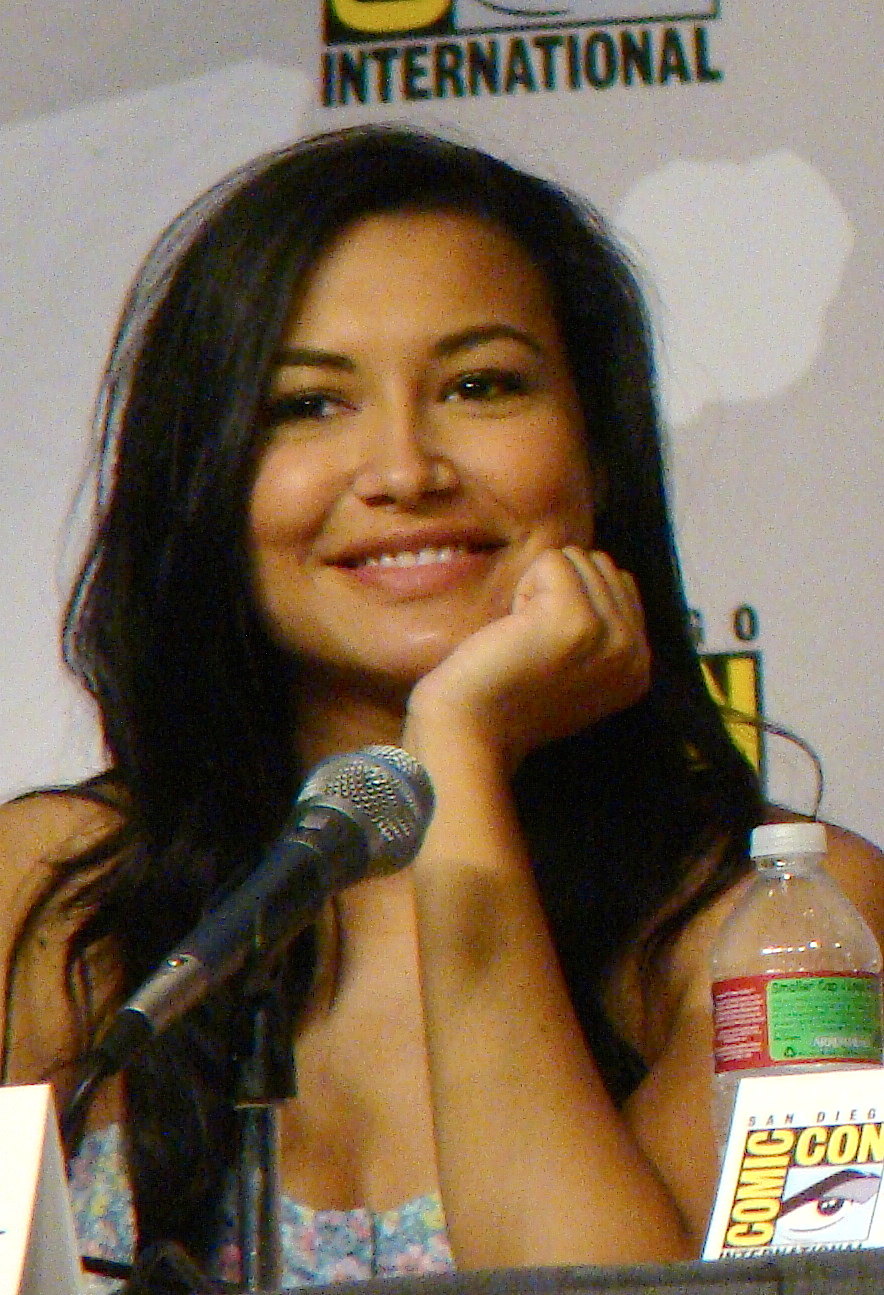
Naya Rivera

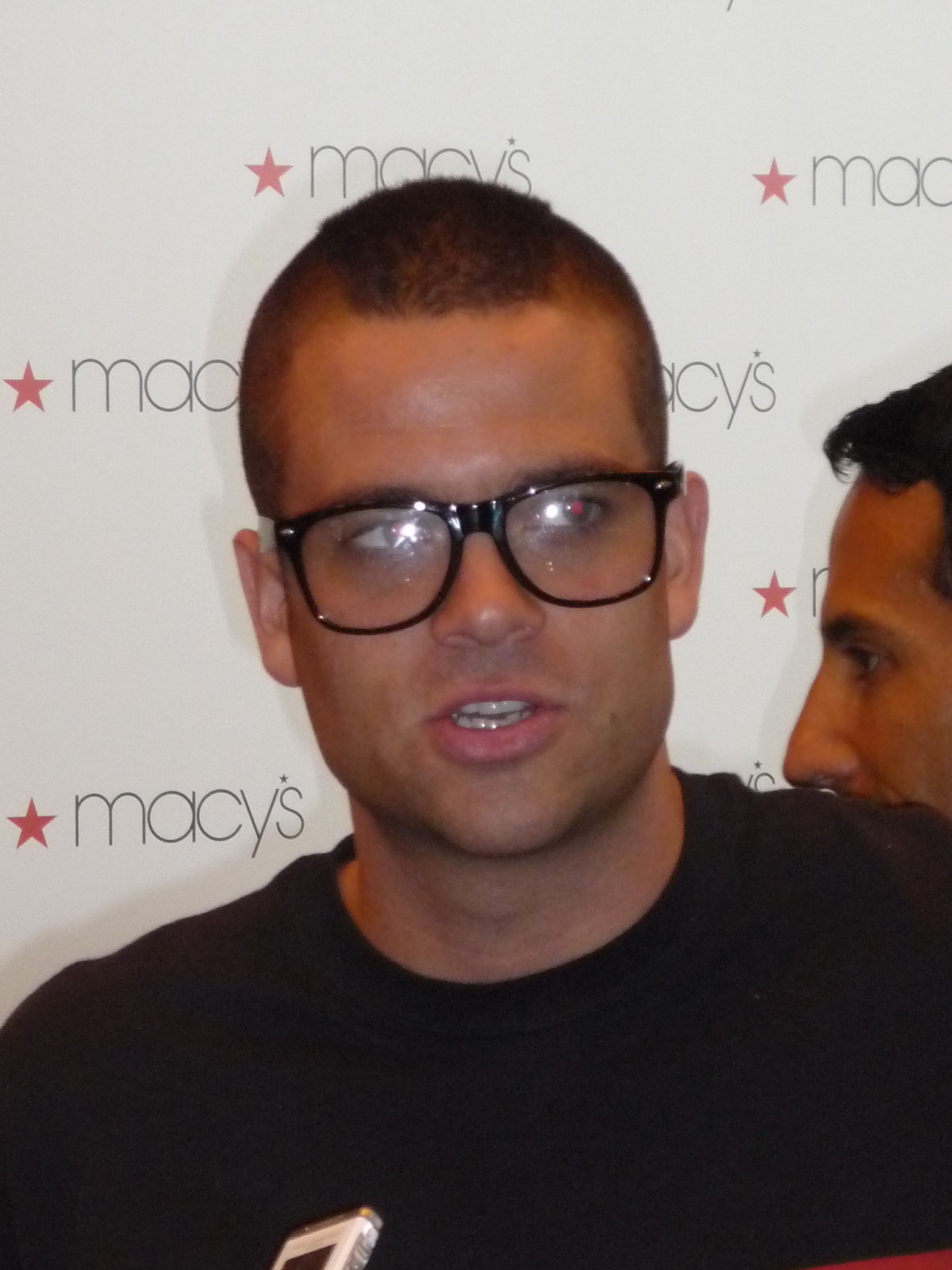
Mark Salling

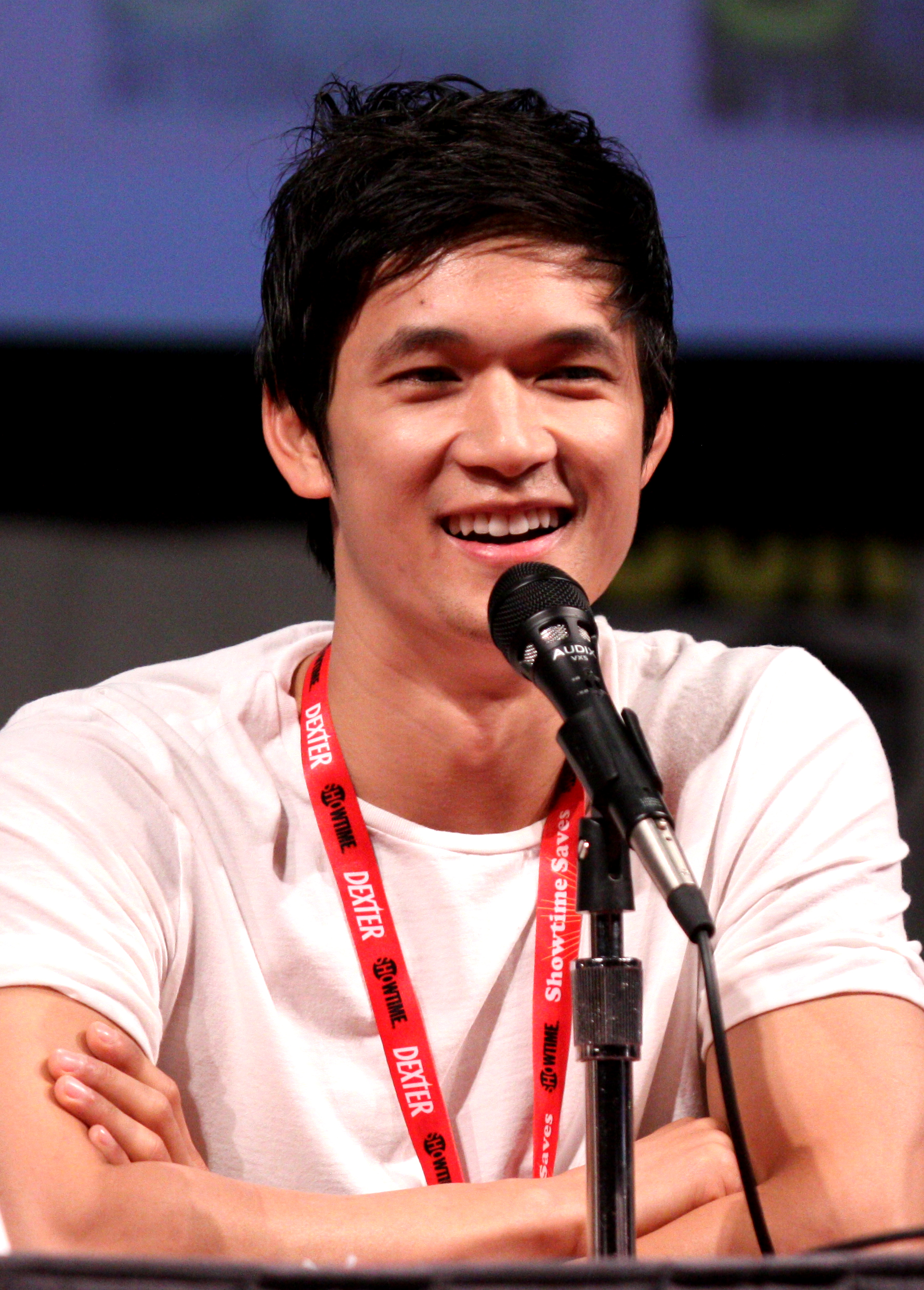
Harry Shum, Jr.

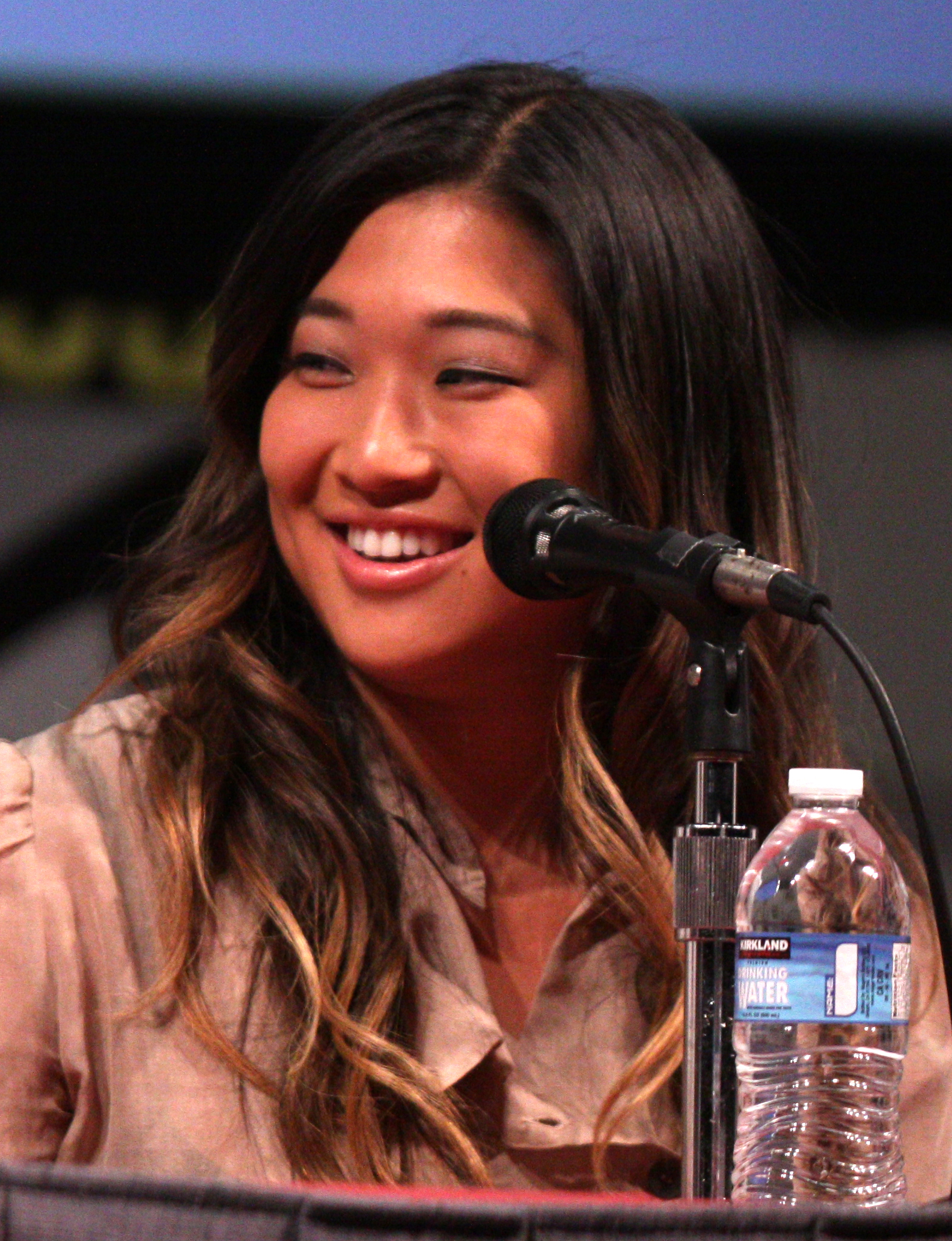
Jenna Ushkowitz

Fox credits fifteen main cast members for the season: Morrison as glee club director Will Schuester, Jane Lynch as cheerleading coach Sue Sylvester, Jayma Mays as guidance counselor Emma Pillsbury, and Dianna Agron, Chris Colfer, Darren Criss, Kevin McHale, Lea Michele, Cory Monteith, Heather Morris, Amber Riley, Naya Rivera, Mark Salling, Harry Shum, Jr. and Jenna Ushkowitz as glee club members Quinn Fabray, Kurt Hummel, Blaine Anderson, Artie Abrams, Rachel Berry, Finn Hudson, Brittany Pierce, Mercedes Jones, Santana Lopez, Noah "Puck" Puckerman, Mike Chang and Tina Cohen-Chang respectively. Criss and Shum, Jr. received contractual upgrades, having formerly been recurring cast members. According to journalist Michael Ausiello, one main cast member who is no longer a series regular is Jessalyn Gilsig as Will's ex-wife, Terri Schuester. O'Malley, who plays Kurt's father Burt, was a series regular during the second season, but is listed among the guest cast for this season.

Murphy stated that some of the original characters would depart at the end of the season. He explained: "This next season will be their senior year, and then that they will graduate. We didn't want to have a show where they were in high school for eight years. We really wanted to be true to that experience." It was initially reported that the third season would be the last for Michele, Monteith and Colfer. However, during the 2011 San Diego Comic-Con panel, executive producer Brad Falchuk stated that while Michele, Monteith and Colfer will graduate by the end of the third season, "because they're graduating doesn't mean they're leaving the show". Falchuk insisted "it was never our plan or our intention to let them go. ... They are not done with the show after this season."

Chord Overstreet, who played glee club member Sam Evans during the second season, did not return to the show at the start of the third season. According to Falchuk, Overstreet was invited back to guest-star for ten episodes "with an eye towards becoming a series regular at midseason", but Overstreet declined. It was reported on October 18, 2011, and confirmed by Murphy six days later, that Overstreet would be returning as a recurring character starting with the season's eighth episode. With Sam gone at the beginning of the season, Falchuk said that Mercedes "has this new boyfriend she met over the summer who's pretty cool". Friday Night Lights' LaMarcus Tinker is portraying Mercedes' new love interest, Shane Tinsley. Formerly known as "Bubba" and then as "Marcus", he is "a massive linebacker for the McKinley Titans". Their relationship was compared to Cuba Gooding Jr. and his wife in Jerry Maguire, as he "encourages her to want more for herself". Ryan Murphy has said they plan to introduce four new cast members, "kids that come in with their own stories." At least two of these are female students: Sugar, who is well-off, self-confident, and has a tin ear, and Sheila, "a modern-day Joan Jett". The recurring role of Sugar Motta is played by Vanessa Lengies. Both Tinker and Lengies appeared in the season premiere, as did a character named Sheila played by Raven Goodwin, who is one of the Skanks, a group of outcast girls that includes Quinn. Another new recurring character is Sebastian Smythe, played by Grant Gustin, a "gay Dalton Academy Warbler who sets his sights on Blaine". Idina Menzel reprises her role as Shelby Corcoran in a story arc that has her teaching at McKinley; she first appeared in the season's second episode. Jonathan Groff returned for a third season as Jesse St. James, appearing in two episodes as the new coach of Vocal Adrenaline. Murphy also intended for guest star Gwyneth Paltrow to return as substitute teacher Holly Holliday. Other recurring characters who are returning include former glee club member Lauren Zizes (Ashley Fink), Principal Figgins (Iqbal Theba), football coach Shannon Beiste (Dot-Marie Jones), cheerleader Becky Jackson (Lauren Potter), school reporter Jacob Ben Israel (Josh Sussman), and TV news anchors Rod Remington (Bill A. Jones) and Andrea Carmichael (Earlene Davis). Closeted gay athlete Dave Karofsky (Max Adler) also returns, as does Finn's mother Carole Hudson-Hummel (Romy Rosemont) along with Quinn's mother Judy Fabray (Charlotte Ross) and Puck's mother (Gina Hecht). Starting this season NeNe Leakes had a recurring role as Coach Roz Washington.

The Glee Project, a reality series featuring auditions for the show, started airing on Oxygen on June 12, 2011, and the final episode of the season was broadcast on August 21, 2011. The winning prize was a seven-episode guest-starring role in the third season. The show was originally intended to air on Fox ahead of season two, but was cancelled due to Murphy's desire to concentrate on the main series. The project was revived when Oxygen purchased re-run rights to Glee, and Murphy committed to executive produce the series as it is part of the Glee brand. Di Loreto served as an executive producer, alongside Embassy Row's Michael Davies and Shauna Minoprio. Assisted by Glee's choreographer Zach Woodlee and casting director Robert J. Ulrich—who screened over 40,000 applicants—they selected the winner over ten episodes, from a shortlist of twelve contenders. After the show completed shooting, Murphy announced that the winner would play Sue's archenemy on the show. However, there were two winners of The Glee Project prize of a seven-episode arc, Damian McGinty and Samuel Larsen. The other two finalists, Lindsay Pearce and Alex Newell, each won a two-episode arc on the show. Pearce appeared in the season premiere as Harmony, a singer who intimidates Rachel with her talent, and returned in the eighth episode in which Harmony led a rival show choir at the Sectionals competition. McGinty appeared starting in the fourth episode as Rory Flanagan, an Irish exchange student who is living with Brittany's family. Larsen debuted in the thirteenth episode as transfer student Joe Hart, and Newell first appeared in the sixteenth episode as Wade Adams, a member of rival glee club Vocal Adrenaline.

In a July 2011 interview, Murphy noted that when he and Falchuk ask fans what they want to see, meeting the parents of the characters is a major demand. He said that "some of them" would be seen in the future. Several sets of parents were introduced over the course of the season: Mike Chang's parents, Julia Chang and Mike Chang Sr., played by Tamlyn Tomita and Keong Sim respectively; Emma Pillsbury's parents, Rose and Rusty Pillsbury, played by Valerie Mahaffey and Don Most; Sam Evans's parents, Dwight and Mary Evans, played by John Schneider and Tanya Clarke; and Rachel's parents, Hiram and LeRoy Berry, played by Jeff Goldblum and Brian Stokes Mitchell respectively. Rick Pasqualone appeared as Sugar Motta's father, Al Motta. Thomas Calabro appeared as Puck's father. Gloria Estefan played Santana Lopez's mother, Maribel, in the season finale.

== Reception ==
=== Critical response ===
Robert Canning of IGN summed up about the premiere episode that "Unfortunately, the premiere didn't add anything new to make me think I wasn't eating the same sugary snack we've been force-fed all summer." James Poniewozik of Time magazine wrote that "Monteith especially acts the hell out of the scene, but the way it unfolds, both of them in the car watching their realities change, is one of the best things the show has ever done", while The A.V. Club's Emily VanDerWerff gave the season a "C+", and stated: "Wildly ambitious at times, not always successful, but always trying weird, new things." Huffington Post's Crystal Bell said regarding the season finale: "We did end up with a graduation episode that was heartfelt, comical and, yes, absolutely ridiculous".

The review aggregator website Rotten Tomatoes gives the season a 53% with an average rating of 7.18/10, based on 19 reviews. The site's critics consensus reads, "Impending graduation and a race to the top provides this season some emotional power and stakes, but Glee will strain many viewers' credulity with a flurry of melodramatic developments that feel more cynically calculated than organic to characters who feel increasingly more like soundboards than people."

=== Ratings ===
==== Live + SD ratings ====
Viewership and ratings per episode of Glee season 3
No.	Title	Air date	Rating/share (18–49)	Viewers (millions)
1	"The Purple Piano Project"	September 20, 2011	4.0/11	9.21
2	"I Am Unicorn"	September 27, 2011	3.7/10	8.60
3	"Asian F"	October 4, 2011	3.6/10	8.42
4	"Pot o' Gold"	November 1, 2011	3.0/8	7.47
5	"The First Time"	November 8, 2011	3.1/8	6.91
6	"Mash Off"	November 15, 2011	3.0/8	7.08
7	"I Kissed a Girl"	November 29, 2011	3.2/8	7.90
8	"Hold On to Sixteen"	December 6, 2011	3.0/8	7.11
9	"Extraordinary Merry Christmas"	December 13, 2011	3.0/8	7.13
10	"Yes/No"	January 17, 2012	3.1/8	7.50
11	"Michael"	January 31, 2012	3.7/10	9.07
12	"The Spanish Teacher"	February 7, 2012	3.3/9	7.81
13	"Heart"	February 14, 2012	2.8/8	6.99
14	"On My Way"	February 21, 2012	3.0/8	7.46
15	"Big Brother"	April 10, 2012	2.7/7	6.76
16	"Saturday Night Glee-ver"	April 17, 2012	2.4/7	6.23
17	"Dance with Somebody"	April 24, 2012	2.7/8	6.90
18	"Choke"	May 1, 2012	2.5/8	6.01
19	"Prom-asaurus"	May 8, 2012	2.7/8	6.67
20	"Props"	May 15, 2012	2.5/8	6.09
21	"Nationals"	May 15, 2012	2.5/7	6.03
22	"Goodbye"	May 22, 2012	2.9/8	7.46

== Home video releases ==
Glee: The Complete Third Season was released on August 14, 2012, in DVD (with 6-set discs) and Blu-ray (with 4-set discs), and contains the special features; "Glee Music Jukebox", "Glee Under the Stars", "Deleted Scenes", "Santana's Santa Baby Music Video", "Young Sue's Oklahoma! Music Video", "Glee Give a Note", "Welcome to the Class", "Making the Finale", "Sue Addresses Her Fans", "More of Sue's Quips" and "Ginger Supremacists" Extended Scene". This was the first season to not have "Volume" releases.

Glee – The Complete Third Season
Set details	Special features	
22 episodes; 6-disc set; Running time: 963 minutes; 1.77:1 aspect ratio; English; Subtitles: English, French, Spanish	Glee Music Jukebox; Glee Under the Stars; Santana's "Santa Baby" Music Video; Glee Give a Note; Welcome to the Class; Making the Finale; Sue Addresses Her Fans; Ask Sue: World Domination Blog; Glee Swap: Behind the Scenes of "Props"; More of Sue's Quips	
DVD release dates
Region 1	Region 2	Region 4
August 14, 2012	September 17, 2012	September 19, 2012
