= Saturday Night Glee-ver =

- Glee episode
- Episode no.: Season 3 Episode 16
- Directed by: Bradley Buecker
- Written by: Matthew Hodgson
- Production code: 3ARC16
- Original air date: April 17, 2012

Guest appearances
- Jonathan Groff as Jesse St. James; Chord Overstreet as Sam Evans; Alex Newell as Wade "Unique" Adams; Samuel Larsen as Joe Hart; Lauren Potter as Becky Jackson

Episode chronology
← Previous "Big Brother"	Next → "Dance with Somebody"
- Glee season 3

"Saturday Night Glee-ver" is the sixteenth episode of the third season of the American musical television series Glee, and the sixtieth overall. Written by Matthew Hodgson and directed by Bradley Buecker, the episode aired on Fox in the United States on April 17, 2012, and features a tribute to the 1970s movie Saturday Night Fever and its Bee Gees–infused soundtrack.

Upon its initial airing, this episode attracted 6.23 million American viewers and received a 2.4/7 Nielsen rating/share in the 18–49 demographic, an all-time low rating for the show in that demographic and a decrease in viewership of nearly 8% from the 2.7/8 rating/share and 6.76 million viewers of the previous episode, "Big Brother", which was broadcast on April 10, 2012.

== Plot ==
After seeing that seniors Mercedes (Amber Riley), Santana (Naya Rivera) and Finn (Cory Monteith) are uncertain about what to do with their future, glee club director Will Schuester (Matthew Morrison) and Sue Sylvester (Jane Lynch) attempt to motivate them through the 1970s movie Saturday Night Fever. Though most New Directions members don't like the idea of performing disco, they are enthusiastic about the prize Sue offers for the best performance.

Wade Adams (Alex Newell), a transgender student from rival glee club Vocal Adrenaline and a fan of Mercedes and Kurt (Chris Colfer), asks their advice about performing while presenting as female. They initially caution her against doing so, but Sue later convinces them to tell her to go ahead so that Vocal Adrenaline will lose their Regionals competition and not be competing against them at Nationals. Mercedes and Kurt later regret this reversal, and go to the competition to renew their original advice, but are stopped by Vocal Adrenaline's director, Jesse St. James (Jonathan Groff). Once Jesse realizes that Wade is on stage in female clothes, he attempts to order her off it, but Wade proves to be a success.

Mercedes sings "Disco Inferno", and reveals that although she wants to be a star, she does not know to get a record deal and is leery of moving to California on her own. Her former boyfriend Sam (Chord Overstreet) later shows her a YouTube video that he posted of her choir room performance, which has received very enthusiastic feedback. He tells her he believes in her and her talent, and kisses her.

After performing "If I Can't Have You", Santana reveals that she is not interested in attending college but wants to be famous by any means necessary. This prompts her girlfriend Brittany (Heather Morris) to post a sex tape of her and Santana so that Santana can become famous. Sue calls the pair into her office and tells Santana how disappointed she is in Santana's focus on fame at all costs as she feels that unlike many of the famous for being famous celebrities she has genuine talent. Sue then gives Santana a letter from one of the top college cheerleading programs in the country, which offers Santana a full scholarship, and reveals that it was Brittany's idea. Santana tells Brittany how much she loves her since no one had cared about her future as much as she did.

Puck (Mark Salling) has been encouraging Finn to go to Los Angeles with him to partner in his pool-cleaning business, but Finn decides he will be going with Rachel to New York as originally planned. Although Puck is disappointed, he makes Finn promise that Finn will become successful in what he does with his life.

Rachel (Lea Michele) and Finn reconcile after their recent argument and Rachel attempts to help Finn find a dream of his own. Although Rachel, Will and guidance counselor Emma Pillsbury (Jayma Mays) suggest a number of colleges, Finn throws the brochures in the garbage. When confronted by Will about this, he explains that he feels he isn't qualified for anything. Will forces Finn to watch Saturday Night Fever, which proves to be inspirational: Finn sings "More Than a Woman" to Rachel, and tells her he wants to become an actor and has decided to enroll in the Actors Studio in New York City.

== Production ==
"Saturday Night Glee-ver" is the fourth episode in the third season to be directed by co-executive producer Bradley Buecker, and the second to be written by Matthew Hodgson. Shooting for the episode began on February 16, 2012, while the previous episode, "Big Brother", was still being filmed, and ended on March 7, 2012.

At one point the episode uses brief scenes from season one episodes "Dream On" and "Mattress" and the season two episode "Duets".

On January 15, 2012, two days before the first Glee winter episode was aired, it was announced that there would be an episode airing in April that featured the Saturday Night Fever soundtrack. Show co-creator Ryan Murphy said, "We've never done disco on the show, but I'm interested in the genius of the Bee Gees". This would be the second tribute episode in the third season, despite Murphy and co-creator Brad Falchuk previously stating that the season would only have a single tribute episode in the third season, and that episode had already been announced as "Michael", the second winter episode, which was being aired later in January. The night the episode aired, co-executive producer Ali Adler revealed in a tweet that the original illuminated dance floor featured in Saturday Night Fever was being reused for scenes in that night's episode.

Jonathan Groff returns for his third season as a recurring special guest star in the role of Jesse St. James. Ryan Murphy had previously announced that Jesse would be returning near the end of the third season as the new coach of rival glee club Vocal Adrenaline, the group he had been the star of in the first season when they defeated New Directions in competition. The Glee Project runner-up Alex Newell, who won a two-episode recurring role on Glee, makes their first appearance in the role of Wade Adams, Vocal Adrenaline's lead singer.

In addition to Groff and Newell, recurring guest stars appearing in the episode include glee club members Sam Evans (Overstreet) and Joe Hart (Samuel Larsen) and cheerleader Becky Jackson (Lauren Potter).

Eight songs from the episode, all originally from Saturday Night Fever, have been released as singles available for digital download. These songs include five by the Bee Gees: "Night Fever", "Stayin' Alive", "You Should Be Dancing", "More Than a Woman" and "How Deep Is Your Love". The other three are "Disco Inferno" by The Trammps, Yvonne Elliman's "If I Can't Have You" and KC and the Sunshine Band's "Boogie Shoes". None of the songs charted on the Billboard Hot 100 or the Billboard Canadian Hot 100.

== Ratings ==
"Saturday Night Glee-ver" was first broadcast on April 17, 2012 in the United States on Fox. It received a 2.4/7 Nielsen rating/share in the 18–49 demographic, and attracted 6.23 million American viewers during its initial airing, an all-time low rating for the show in that demographic and a decrease in viewership of nearly 8% from the 2.7/8 rating/share and 6.76 million viewers of the previous episode, "Big Brother", which was broadcast on April 10, 2012. Viewership also fell in Canada, where 1.54 million viewers watched the episode on the same day as its American premiere. It was the twelfth most-viewed show of the week, down two slots and almost 14% from the 1.79 million viewers who watched "Big Brother" the previous week.

In the United Kingdom, "Saturday Night Glee-ver" first aired on April 19, 2012, and was watched on Sky 1 by 827,000 viewers. Unlike in other countries, viewership increased significantly rather than declining, by nearly 9% over "Big Brother", which attracted 759,000 viewers when it aired the week before. In Australia, "Saturday Night Glee-ver" was broadcast on April 19, 2012. It was watched by 568,000 viewers, a drop of over 13% from the 655,000 viewers for "Big Brother" on April 12, 2012. This made Glee the sixteenth most-watched program of the night, down from twelfth the week before.
