= Michael (Glee) =

- Glee episode
- Episode no.: Season 3 Episode 11
- Directed by: Alfonso Gomez-Rejon
- Written by: Ryan Murphy
- Production code: 3ARC11
- Original air date: January 31, 2012

Guest appearances
- Mike O'Malley as Burt Hummel; Chord Overstreet as Sam Evans; Grant Gustin as Sebastian Smythe; Damian McGinty as Rory Flanagan; 2Cellos as the Dalton cellists

Episode chronology
← Previous "Yes/No"	Next → "The Spanish Teacher"
- Glee season 3

"Michael" is the eleventh episode of the third season of the American musical television series Glee, and the fifty-fifth overall. Written by co-creator Ryan Murphy and directed by Alfonso Gomez-Rejon, the episode aired on Fox in the United States on January 31, 2012. It is a special tribute episode to Michael Jackson, and features eight of his songs as a solo artist, and one he sang as part of The Jackson 5.

Reviews were widely varied for the episode: some felt it was the best of the third season to date, and others were quite critical, though the overall mix was somewhat more positive than negative. A number of reviewers noted that tribute episodes have tended to be light on plot, though several felt that this episode had surmounted the usual storyline problems that had plagued past tributes.

The episode's musical performances were viewed more favorably, with many of the nine performances given high praise, including "Wanna Be Startin' Somethin'", "Human Nature", "Smooth Criminal", and "Scream", the last of these primarily for Kevin McHale's dancing. Five of the songs—the first three above plus "Bad" and "Black or White"—charted on the Billboard Hot 100 and the Canadian Hot 100, while the other four were also released as singles but did not chart.

Upon its initial airing, this episode was viewed by 9.07 million American viewers and received a 3.7/10 Nielsen rating/share in the 18–49 demographic. The total viewership was up over 20% from the previous episode, "Yes/No".

== Plot ==
Glee club members Mercedes (Amber Riley), Santana (Naya Rivera) and Brittany (Heather Morris) are disappointed that they missed their chance to sing Michael Jackson's music at Sectionals, so director Will Schuester (Matthew Morrison) says that New Directions might include Jackson for the upcoming Regionals competition. Blaine (Darren Criss) performs "Wanna Be Startin' Somethin'" to demonstrate his suggested number. However, he mentions this possibility to Sebastian Smythe (Grant Gustin), the new captain of the Dalton Academy Warblers and a Regionals competitor, and Sebastian later announces that the Warblers, who will be performing first, will also be doing Jackson's music. New Directions challenges the Warblers for the right to perform Jackson, and they meet in a parking garage at night and compete to "Bad". At the end of the number, Sebastian throws a slushie at Kurt (Chris Colfer) but Blaine interposes himself: he is hit in the face and badly injured.

Finn (Cory Monteith) asks Rachel (Lea Michele) for her answer to his proposal since he has waited the three days she requested, but she is not ready, so he agrees to wait longer. Rachel asks Quinn (Dianna Agron) for advice, and Quinn advises her to refuse and leave her past behind. Quinn has done so, and she has been accepted at Yale; she sings "Never Can Say Goodbye" to former boyfriends Puck (Mark Salling), Finn and Sam (Chord Overstreet), and to the glee club. Sam calls Mercedes to the auditorium and asks her to sing with him—they have never duetted in glee club. She refuses and starts to leave, but he begins "Human Nature" and she joins in. Afterward, they kiss.

Blaine's cornea was deeply scratched in the incident and he needs surgery. The club wants revenge on Sebastian; Kurt says he should be expelled from Dalton, but Will asks them to let the system handle it. Artie (Kevin McHale) refuses: he is fed up with being told it will get better and says it should be better now, and leaves. Despite wanting revenge, Kurt is unwilling to use violence, so Santana goes to Dalton and accuses Sebastian of lying about the composition of the damaging slushie. He challenges her to a duel: the song "Smooth Criminal". He admits after they finish that he rigged the slushie with rock salt, and hits her with an unadulterated one. Santana secretly recorded the encounter, and plays her evidence to New Directions, who in turn invite the Warblers to their auditorium, show them that they "get" Jackson better by performing "Black or White", and reveal to the Warblers the proof that Sebastian deliberately tried to injure one of them.

Kurt's father Burt (Mike O'Malley) takes Kurt out of class to hand him his letter from NYADA. Kurt opens it and discovers to his elation he is a finalist for admission; Burt is overcome with pride. Kurt tells Rachel, only to discover that she has not received any letter from the school; Rachel dissolves in tears. Finn later sings "I Just Can't Stop Loving You" to Rachel, and she tells him she loves him and that she accepts his proposal. She ultimately does get a finalist letter from NYADA and tells Kurt, to his joy, but she has not yet told Finn.

== Production ==
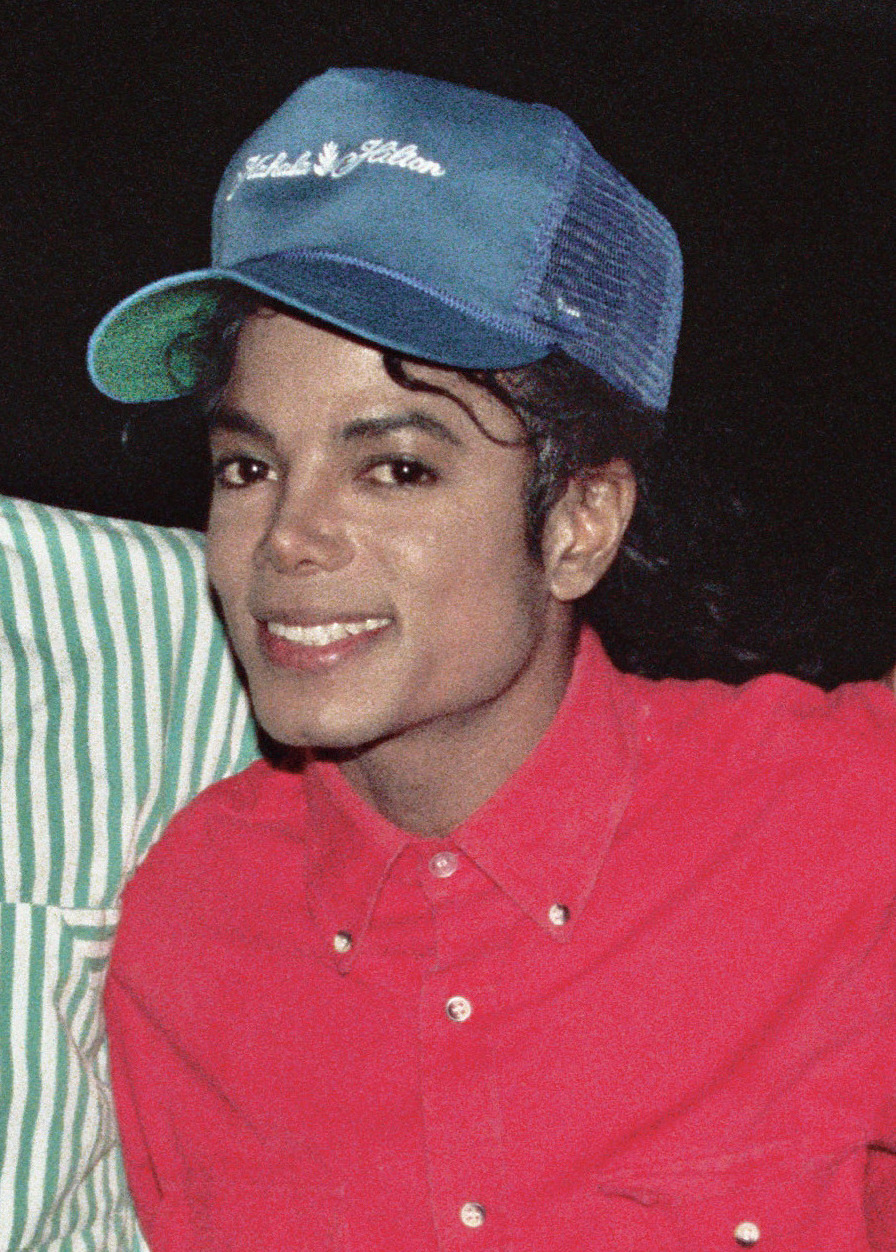
Glee co-creators Ryan Murphy and Brad Falchuk had wanted to a tribute episode to Michael Jackson (pictured) since the show's first season.

Executive producers Ryan Murphy and Brad Falchuk had been mentioning since before the second season ended that they were planning another big tribute episode that they had been wanting to do since the first season, but would not reveal the name of the artist. On December 6, 2011, the same day that they were airing the "Hold On to Sixteen" episode that featured three Jackson family songs, Murphy announced that they had finally obtained the rights to do a Michael Jackson tribute episode.

The episode was written by Murphy and directed by Alfonso Gomez-Rejon, who had most recently directed Asian F. Filming had begun by December 12, 2011, and was interrupted by a two-week holiday vacation. Both of the last two shooting days before the vacation began, December 15 and 16, ran a couple of hours past midnight, with the final night not ending until three in the morning. Filming had not yet completed when the twelfth episode, with guest star Ricky Martin, began filming on January 5, 2012, the third day after the holiday vacation ended. The two episodes continued in parallel until the final Michael Jackson number was shot on January 13, 2012, over a month after filming began and the same day that the thirteenth episode commenced filming.

It had been announced late in the summer that Darren Criss, who plays Blaine Anderson, would be starring on Broadway in How to Succeed in Business Without Really Trying from January 3 through 22, 2012, with rehearsals beginning there a couple of weeks before his debut. At the time, the reports said he would be missing "an episode and a half of Glee". The final scene filmed before the holiday break was the first song in the episode, for which Criss sang lead, and he filmed several scenes in the episode in those last four days. He is singing lead on the song "Wanna Be Startin' Somethin'". Criss spent five weeks in New York City, the last three starring in How to Succeed in Business Without Really Trying from January 3 through 22, 2012.

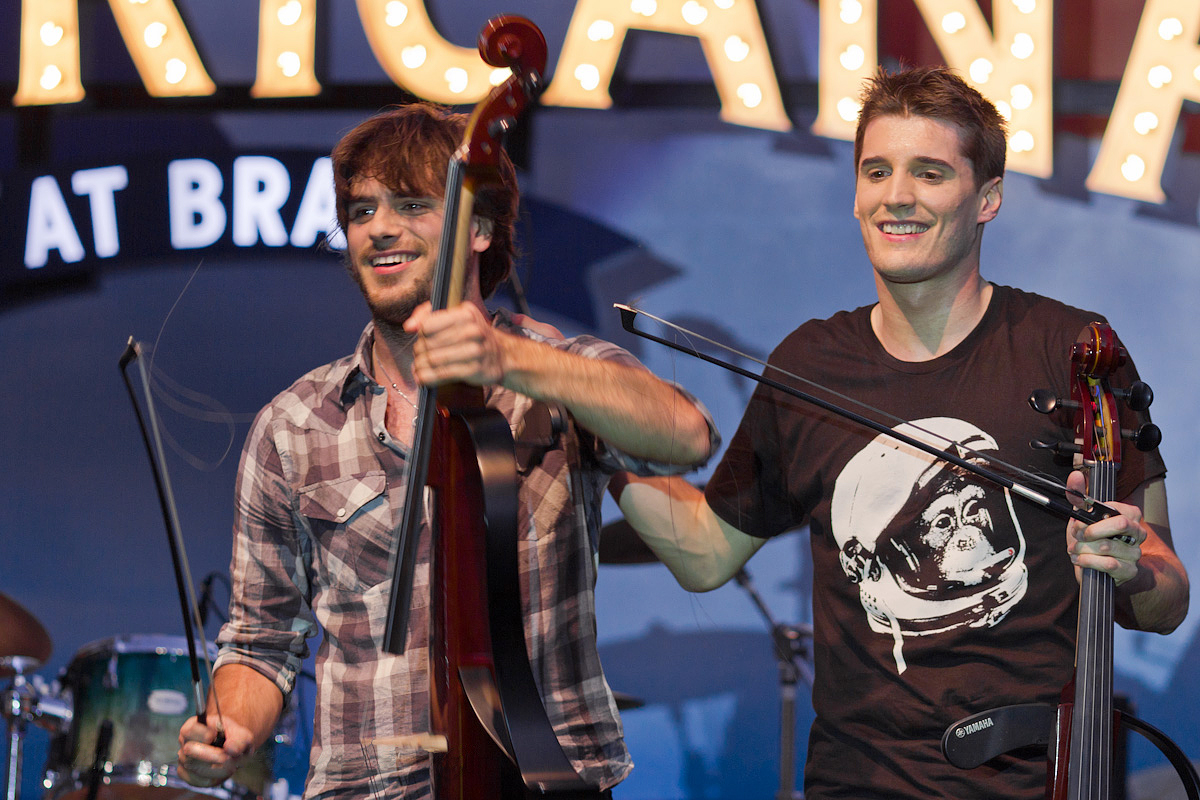
The performance of "Smooth Criminal" featured the instrumental duo 2Cellos (Stjepan Hauser, left, and Luka Šulić, right).

The Dalton Academy Warblers return in this episode, and perform "Bad" with New Directions, which was shot on location in a "parking garage just outside the Paramount Studio gates". On the previous day, several members of New Directions did their first location shoots in the building used for Dalton Academy. The Warblers shot their own number, "I Want You Back" by The Jackson 5 with Gustin on lead vocal, but the song was omitted from the final cut of the episode. This was the second time in the third season that ten musical performances were shot for an episode but only nine were ultimately included: Rivera's rendition of "Santa Baby" was cut from the episode two before this one, "Extraordinary Merry Christmas". "I Want You Back", like "Santa Baby" before it, was nevertheless released as a single, and on August 3, 2012, Murphy released the originally filmed scene including it uploaded to his YouTube page. The Warblers number had already run into difficulties earlier in production: it was originally planned to be Jackson's "Rock with You", but there were problems clearing the rights, so "I Want You Back" was selected and filmed instead. Gustin and Rivera performed "Smooth Criminal" with on-screen musical guests 2Cellos, Luka Šulić and Stjepan Hauser, who became famous when their instrument-only two-cello cover of the piece received over three million views on YouTube in its first two weeks. The arrangement used for the performance is based on the 2Cellos version.

The remaining six songs that are covered in the episode include "I Just Can't Stop Loving You", performed by Michele and Monteith; The Jackson 5's "Never Can Say Goodbye", sung by Agron; "Ben" sung by Colfer, Michele and Monteith; "Black or White" featuring Riley, Rivera, Michele, McHale and Colfer; "Human Nature" sung by Riley and Overstreet; and the Michael and Janet Jackson song "Scream", performed by McHale and Harry Shum, Jr. "Human Nature" was originally reported as being part of a mash-up with Nat King Cole's "Nature Boy", but the song as performed is the Jackson song alone. All ten songs recorded—the nine in the episode plus "I Want You Back" which was ultimately cut—have been released as singles, available for download.

Recurring guest stars in the episode include Kurt's father Burt Hummel (O'Malley), glee club members Sam Evans (Overstreet) and Rory Flanagan (Damian McGinty), and Dalton Academy Warbler Sebastian Smythe (Gustin).

== Reception ==
=== Ratings ===
"Michael" was first broadcast on January 31, 2012, in the United States on Fox. It received a 3.7/10 Nielsen rating/share in the 18–49 demographic, and attracted 9.07 million American viewers during its initial airing, an increase of over 20% from the 3.1/8 rating/share and 7.50 million viewers of the previous episode, "Yes/No", which was broadcast on January 17, 2012. In Canada, 1.84 million viewers watched the episode on the same day as its American premiere. It was the tenth most-viewed show of the week, up two slots and 14% from the 1.61 million viewers who watched "Yes/No" two weeks earlier.

In the United Kingdom, "Michael" first aired on March 8, 2012, and was watched on Sky 1 by 682,000 viewers. Viewership was down over 15% from "Yes/No", which attracted 805,000 viewers when it aired the week before. In Australia, "Michael" was broadcast on February 24, 2012. It was watched by 535,000 viewers, which made Glee the thirteenth most-watched program of the night, down from eleventh the week before. The viewership was down nearly 4% from the previous episode, "Yes/No", which was seen by 556,000 viewers.

=== Critical reception ===
The episode was given a widely varied reception by reviewers, ranging from Erica Futterman of Rolling Stone, who called it "season three's best episode so far", to BuddyTV's John Kubicek, who described the episode as "just plain silly and ridiculous", though the overall mix was somewhat more positive than negative. Raymund Flandez of The Wall Street Journal wrote that "the episode was well paced, well sung and well danced", though he was unhappy with the concluding number, and Entertainment Weekly's Joseph Brannigan Lynch said the episode "contained some of this season's best dramatic and musical performances". Crystal Bell of HuffPost TV stated that she was "a little underwhelmed" by the episode, which "never quite lived up to the greatness that is Michael Jackson". IGN's Robert Canning gave the episode a "great" 8 out of 10, and characterized it as "more than just a theme episode" in which he was "connecting to characters" that had not "grabbed" him since the first season.

MTV's Kevin P. Sullivan summarized the episode as follows: "When all was said and done, it was another tribute episode, something that can't be uttered by a Glee fan without a sigh and an eye roll." Bell noted that tribute episodes usually mean that "all sense of plot continuity" is forgone, but that this one ranked "at the top of all of the other Glee tribute episodes because even though it was absurd at times, at least there was a plot—and it kind of made sense". Futterman was more complimentary and described it as the "most effortless tribute episode yet", and Canning wrote that "with songs we know and love and storylines that actually connected and delivered some meaningful and moving moments" it was "more than just a theme episode". Jen Chaney of The Washington Post, however, thought that it was very much like previous tributes in that it also "featured scattered plot lines engineered to include as many songs by said artists as possible" and also "glorified their respective pop stars’ images to an absurd degree". The A.V. Club's Emily VanDerWerff also noted the glorification of Jackson, and noted "every time the show turns into an episode about Michael Jackson, it stops dead in its tracks entirely". She stated that what was "weird" about the episode was that "what didn’t work was the spectacle, while what did work were the smaller, character-based stories" which "provided a spine some of the other spectacle-oriented episodes have lacked". Futterman was one of many reviewers who took note of a new feature of this tribute episode when she commented on the "initial whiff of product placement and forced timing" related to the "Immortal World Tour" dialogue. Rae Votta of Billboard thought the inclusion a "brilliant bit of marketing synergy", but TVLine's Michael Slezak called it "ridiculously unsubtle product-placement".

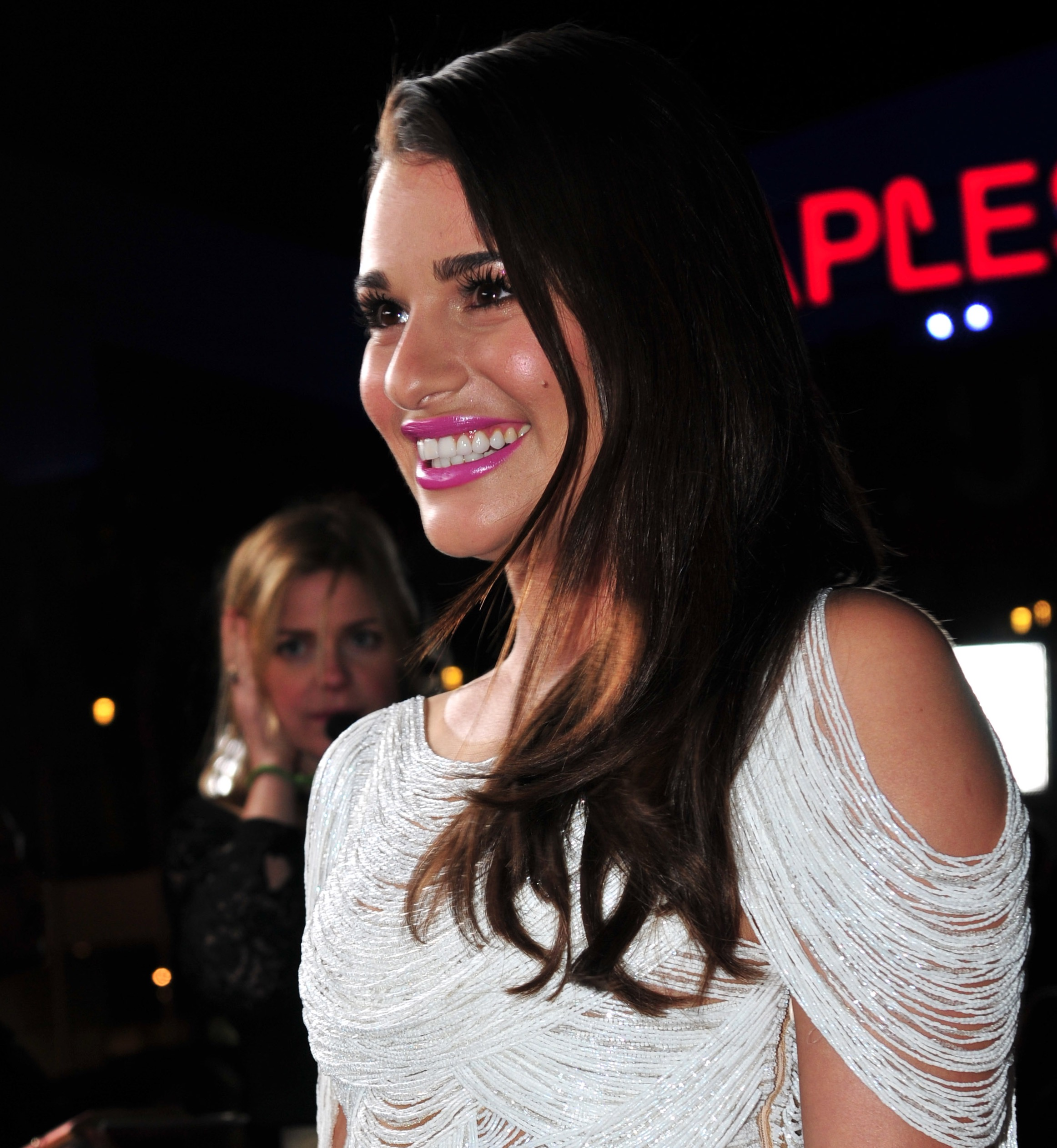
The scene where Rachel (Michele, pictured) "breaks down in front of Kurt" was praised by critics.

Although Rachel's decision to accept Finn's proposal of marriage was greeted with skepticism, Canning spoke for many when he stated that her "arc in the episode was her best in a while" with "some compelling moments". He also cited the "fantastically true advice" from Quinn, and VanDerWerff thought the scene "was going along great until the last 10 seconds" of that advice. Bell praised as "believable" the scene where Rachel "breaks down in front of Kurt", and Slezak said he "loved that scene of Kurt holding his sobbing friend in front of the lockers". Kurt's scene with his father was Bell's "favorite scene" which she said was "an incredibly touching moment between father and son. It was perfect." Flandez also called Burt "perfect" for "delivering the NYADA envelope to his son", and The Hollywood Reporter's Lesley Goldberg described his scene as "another great Burt gem".

Kubicek characterized the fact that Sebastian was not arrested for injuring Blaine as "an absurd plot twist". He criticized Kurt for withholding the evidence and wrote, "Santana's plan isn't vicious or mean, it's getting justice. Sebastian committed a crime and he should pay for it." Slezak thought the decision as to whether the police would be given Santana's evidence should have been Blaine's to make, and Lynch posited that "a talk with the police" might teach Sebastian "that violent actions have legal consequences". Chaney was incredulous at Will's statements to the glee club on the matter, especially, "Unless you have proof that he tampered with the slushie, the police aren’t getting involved." Kubicek called Artie's anger that led to "Scream" a story arc that "goes nowhere and was just a poorly written excuse to do that song", but Votta was impressed that "we learn more about Artie's frustration in this fantasy scene than we have in 3 seasons". Canning wrote that "as extraneous as the extended "Scream" segment was, the build up to that moment was perfect".

=== Music and performances ===
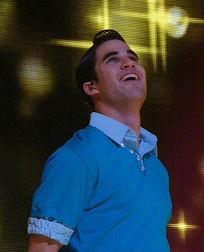
The "slick showmanship" of Blaine (pictured) made him a "natural for lead vocals" on "Wanna Be Startin' Somethin'".

The episode's musical performances were given a better reception than the episode as a whole, though there were some dissenting voices, and not every song was received with the same enthusiasm. Slezak described the episode as "jam-packed with terrific song-and-dance numbers", and Votta wrote that "the musical numbers themselves were strong, fantastical and poignant to the story". Amy Reiter of The Los Angeles Times declared, "The music was good; the dancing, better." Chaney wrote that "too many" of the musical numbers were "weak imitations", which was reflected in her grading: her median grade for the nine numbers was a "C+", and her highest grade was a single "B+".

The first song was "Wanna Be Startin' Somethin'", which Bell said "was a fun homage to Michael Jackson, and it set the tone for the rest of the episode". Futterman said that Blaine's "slick showmanship" made him a "natural for lead vocals", and Slezak called it "the best use of Darren Criss' voice on Glee in quite some time" and gave it an "A−". Lynch also gave it an "A−", and said Criss "captured the excitement and the spunky bravado of the original". Sullivan was another fan of "the sheer awesomeness of Darren Criss" on the song, and characterized it as "a tribute that's more respectful than any other in the episode". Chaney dissented from the general approval; she gave it a "C+" and wrote that "the number was appropriately big and splashy, but musically, it sounded like all the funk had been drained right out of it". She described "Bad" similarly as she gave it a "C−": "this tune also sounded noticeably defunkified". Sullivan was also unimpressed; he wrote that the performance let "the world know what 'Bad' sounds like after it's drained of every ounce of danger". Lynch gave it a "B" and wrote that "as silly as a choreographed gang fight between teenagers in a parking lot sounds (and was), the choreography was crisp and the attitude was a lot of fun". Slezak also praised the fight choreography, and stated that he "got chills" when Santana sang the chorus, and gave the song a "B+". Futterman noted the "interesting twist" in the song's arrangement "thanks to the Warblers' penchant for a cappella", and said that "Artie and Santana" began their battle for "vocal MVP of the episode" with "Bad". Votta described the number as "up there with the Dreamgirls performance from earlier this season as one of the strangest and best things Glee has done".

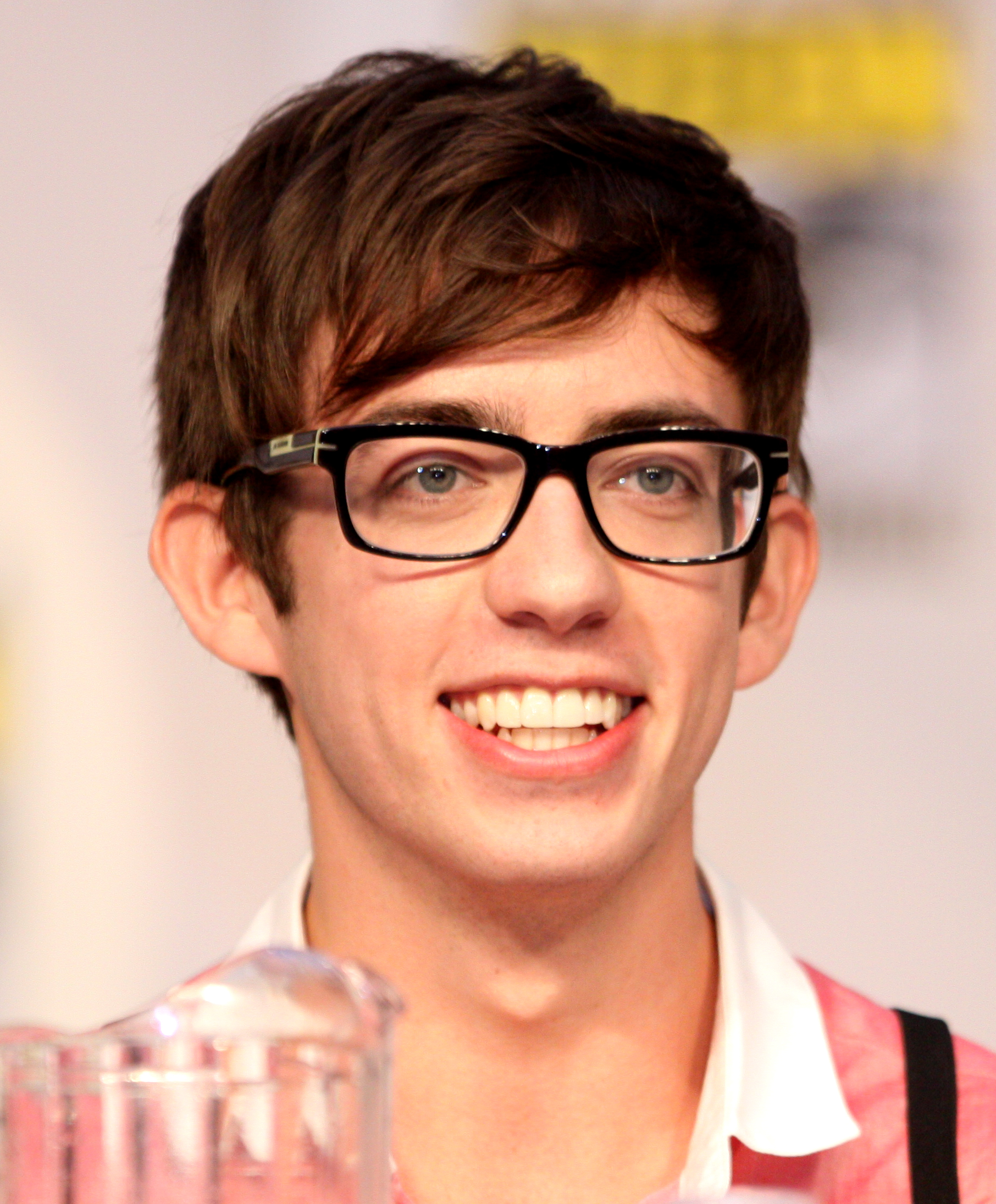
Several reviewers regretted that Kevin McHale (pictured) could not dance more often on the show.

Kevin McHale's performance as Artie in "Scream" inspired several reviewers, including Kate Stanhope of TV Guide and Bell, to write of their regret that McHale could not dance more often on the show. Reiter called him "a sorely underused Glee resource" and called the number "the best dance moment" of the episode, and Bell declared, "I have one word for this number: Epic." Flandez called it a "phenomenal job", and Stanhope cited "killer performances" by McHale on this number and others as evidence that with Artie only a junior "there is life" in New Directions after McKinley's current seniors graduate. Lynch called the number "awesome" and gave it an "A+", and Goldberg described it as "a perfect example of what the show looks like when it's firing on all cylinders"; both reviewers praised the dancing of both performers. Chaney wrote that the performance "lacked the energy and genuine aggression of the original Michael/Janet Jackson collaboration, although at least Kevin McHale and Harry Shum Jr. got to show off their dance skills", and gave it a "C". She felt that "Never Can Say Goodbye", to which she gave a "B−", "worked much better than every track that preceded it" because it adapted the song to the show "instead of trying to out-Jackson Jackson". Lynch called it "a nice summation of her character's journey, but not vocally impressive enough to justify listening to outside of the episode" and gave it a "B". Bell described it as a "blah performance", but Stanhope said it was "sweet and reflective". Futterman wrote that it was "a tune well-suited for Quinn's sultry voice and the flipped meaning she gives the lyrics", and Slezak had a similar take: he gave it an "A" and called it a "remarkably lovely fit" for her voice.

Votta and Futterman both said that Sam and Mercedes sounded "great together" on "Human Nature", and Futterman also complimented their individual voices—"hers restrained and soulful, his rock-tinged and raw"—and summarized, "It's a crisp, well-executed cover". Most other reviewers also noted how good their voices sounded together, including Chaney, who gave the song a "B−", and Bell, who called their harmonies "out-of-this-world amazing". Lynch and Slezak each praised the tenderness in Riley's vocals; Lynch gave the song an "A", and Slezak an "A−". "Ben", however, received far more mixed commentary, and several reviewers felt it was odd to, as Chaney put it, sing a song about a rat "to a guy who isn't named Ben and was wearing an eye patch", which Futterman called "a little creepy" and VanDerWerff, more bluntly, "fucking weird". Despite this, Chaney gave the song a "B", one of her highest grades of the night, in part because it gave Colfer "an excuse to hit those 'You’ve got a friend in me' high notes", while Futterman noted that he "does well in the high range", and praised the verses by Rachel and Finn. Bell, however, called the song "a snooze-fest", and Slezak was very unhappy with the "interminable rendition" which he graded a "D". In December 2012, TV Guide listed the rendition as one of Glee's worst performances.

"Smooth Criminal" was the most highly praised number of the night. Both Slezak and Lynch gave it an "A+": the former called it "an instant Glee classic" that "had me on the edge of my musical chair from start to finish", and Lynch wrote, "Santana declared herself the winner, but the actual victors were 2Cellos, the real-life Croatian cellists whose manic intensity stole the scene." Slezak was similarly impressed by 2Cellos—"this was really a duet between Santana and those amazing black cellos"—and Futterman called them "furiously awesome" and said of the song, "It's the perfect soundtrack for the show's slickest villains: Santana wails, Sebastian channels his Chuck Bass and we are sold." Bell described it as "easily one of the best performances of the night" and added "Santana was flawless". Chaney dissented from the acclaim with a "D" grade.

Slezak described the duet of "I Just Can't Stop Loving You" as "really pretty", and Chaney said that "Lea Michele ... sang this Jackson love song in the loveliest possible fashion with Cory Monteith". Votta wrote that "Finn sounds the best he's sounded", and Futterman noted that Finn held "his own against Rachel, vocally"—she liked the fact that it was Finn singing to Rachel instead of the usual other way around and was "grateful to the Glee team for assigning plot-relevant songs". Lynch felt that the song "seemed to slow down the otherwise wonderfully paced episode" and would have preferred it if they had cut the song and "kept the Warblers' version of 'I Want You Back' instead". He was more enthusiastic about "Black or White", which he characterized as "musically awesome but dramatically confusing" and graded an "A−". Futterman said that "Artie once again nails the MJ impression", and Goldberg declared that the "chorus with Santana leading charge and Artie's rap" were "spot on". Bell agreed that the song showed that "Artie is still New Directions' go-to rapper", but noted that she did not feel that New Directions had successfully demonstrated that they "knew the true meaning of Michael Jackson". Chaney was unenthusiastic and gave the song a "C", while Flandez had more negative opinion than hers: "Sebastian Smythe got our reaction right: a slow-handed clap".

=== Chart history ===
Of the nine cover versions of Michael Jackson's music, all of which were released as singles, five debuted on US and Canadian top 100 charts, and ranked in the same order in both countries. "Smooth Criminal" debuted in the US at number twenty-six on the Billboard Hot 100, with sales of 108,000; only nine songs sold more digital downloads that week. "Human Nature" debuted at number fifty-six, "Black or White" at number sixty-four, "Wanna Be Startin' Somethin'" at number seventy-eight and "Bad" at number eighty. "Smooth Criminal entered the Billboard Canadian Hot 100 chart at number twenty-eight, and was followed by "Human Nature" at number sixty-two, "Black or White" at number sixty-nine, "Wanna Be Startin' Somethin'" at number eighty-eight and "Bad" at number ninety.
