= Yes/No (Glee) =

- Glee episode
- Episode no.: Season 3 Episode 10
- Directed by: Eric Stoltz
- Written by: Brad Falchuk
- Production code: 3ARC10
- Original air date: January 17, 2012

Guest appearances
- Mike O'Malley as Burt Hummel; Dot-Marie Jones as Coach Beiste; Romy Rosemont as Carole Hudson-Hummel; Chord Overstreet as Sam Evans; NeNe Leakes as Roz Washington; Lauren Potter as Becky Jackson; Damian McGinty as Rory Flanagan; Vanessa Lengies as Sugar Motta; LaMarcus Tinker as Shane Tinsley; Don Most as Rusty Pillsbury; Valerie Mahaffey as Rose Pillsbury; Helen Mirren as the inner voice of Becky Jackson (uncredited)

Episode chronology
← Previous "Extraordinary Merry Christmas"	Next → "Michael"
- Glee season 3

"Yes/No" is the tenth episode of the third season of the American musical television series Glee, and the fifty-fourth overall. Written by Brad Falchuk and directed by Eric Stoltz, the episode aired on Fox in the United States on January 17, 2012. It contains the revelation of an elopement, and two marriage proposals, including the proposal by Will Schuester (Matthew Morrison) to Emma Pillsbury (Jayma Mays).

Reviews were mixed for the episode. While Will's actual proposal to Emma was received with more favor than not, the scene where Will asks Finn (Cory Monteith) to be his best man was roundly condemned: the notion that Will had no adult friends and would ask one of his students was inconceivable to many. There was acclaim for the subplot featuring Becky's (Lauren Potter) pursuit of Artie (Kevin McHale), and her mental voiceovers by Helen Mirren.

The musical performances from the episode were greeted more positively than the episode as a whole. All six numbers were released as singles, and five of them charted on the Billboard Hot 100 and the Canadian Hot 100. Upon its initial airing, this episode was viewed by 7.50 million American viewers and received a 3.1/8 Nielsen rating/share in the 18–49 demographic. The total viewership was up from the previous episode, "Extraordinary Merry Christmas".

== Plot ==
After learning Coach Beiste eloped with her now husband Cooter Mankins, Emma (Jayma Mays) wonders whether Will (Matthew Morrison) is ever going to propose marriage. She fantasizes about their wedding, and in the fantasy sings "Wedding Bell Blues". She is mortified to discover that while fantasizing, she inadvertently and publicly asked Will to marry her, and immediately denies having done so. Emboldened nevertheless, Will gives the glee club an assignment: find the perfect song for him to use to propose to Emma.

Mercedes (Amber Riley) and Sam (Chord Overstreet) separately recount their summer relationship to their friends, singing "Summer Nights". Sam suggests to Mercedes that they get back together, but she reminds Sam she is dating Shane (LaMarcus Tinker). Sam, hoping a varsity letterman jacket will impress her, joins the only sports team still recruiting: synchronized swimming. Later, while Mercedes sings "The First Time Ever I Saw Your Face" with Rachel (Lea Michele), Tina (Jenna Ushkowitz) and Santana (Naya Rivera) for Will as their proposal suggestion, she mentally pictures Sam rather than Shane, and is distressed.

Becky Jackson (Lauren Potter, with inner voiceover by Helen Mirren), decides she wants Artie (Kevin McHale) for her boyfriend, and asks him for a date. He later performs for her his idea for Will's proposal—a sexy mash-up of the songs "Moves Like Jagger" and "Jumpin' Jack Flash"—but she informs him that their date also includes dinner. The glee club fears Artie will be raising Becky's hopes, but Artie tells them he had fun on the dinner date, and that they should examine their own prejudices about people with handicaps. However, when Becky tells Artie that she wants to have sex with him, he panics and asks Sue (Jane Lynch) for advice on how to break off the relationship. She advises him to treat Becky like anyone else and tell her directly. Becky is disappointed, and is later comforted by Sue.

Will asks Finn (Cory Monteith) to be his best man, and Finn tells Will that he is considering enlisting in the army. Will has Finn meet with him and Emma, plus his mother Carole (Romy Rosemont) and stepfather Burt (Mike O'Malley), who had not known of his army plans. Finn explains that he feels an obligation to his late father to be a good man and help people. His mother reveals that she hid from him the fact that his father did not die in Iraq, but instead suffered from post-traumatic stress disorder there, was dishonorably discharged, and died in Cincinnati from a drug overdose. The news is devastating to Finn, and he, Rachel and Kurt talk about how the future no longer appears promising. Rachel sings "Without You" to Finn, and the two embrace.

Will asks Emma's parents (Don Most and Valerie Mahaffey) for their blessing to marry her, but they refuse as they doubt Emma could handle marriage and having children. Unaware of that discussion, Emma later asks Will about their progress toward marriage, and he also wonders whether she could cope with a family given her obsessive–compulsive disorder. Though distraught, Emma tells Will that her disease is a part of her: he must decide whether they should stay together. Will, realizing that he loves Emma regardless, stages a spectacular marriage proposal—aided by the glee club and synchronized swim team, who sing and perform a water ballet to "We Found Love"—which Emma tearfully accepts. Later, Finn surprises Rachel with a proposal of marriage, complete with an engagement ring, which leaves her speechless.

== Production ==
Filming began on November 29, 2011, the same day the ninth episode, which had begun shooting on November 10, wrapped up filming. Eric Stoltz directed the episode, his third this season following "The Purple Piano Project" and "Mash Off", and it was written by Glee co-creator Brad Falchuk. Morrison was questioned about Will's rumored proposal to Emma, and said, "It's the most spectacular proposal I've ever seen." He added, "All I can say is it's wet. And it involves a big dance."

Oscar-winning actress Helen Mirren guest-stars in the episode, but is not seen on screen: she has recorded "several long and hilarious monologues" as the "inner voice" of a character in this episode, who turned out to be cheerleader Becky Jackson.

The cast and crew did location filming at Venice High School on December 6, 2011. The school is where exterior locations for the movie musical Grease were filmed. Several members of the cast tweeted photos, as did students from the high school. Vanessa Lengies, who plays Sugar Motta, retweeted a student's photo of herself with some of the students, telling the student, "thanks for letting us borrow your school!"

This episode is the last in Damian McGinty's seven-episode prize from his victory in The Glee Project, but he will be continuing in the role of Rory Flanagan beyond the initial seven. Other recurring guest stars who are appearing in the episode include glee club members Sam Evans (Overstreet) and Sugar Motta (Lengies), cheerleader Becky Jackson (Potter), football coach Shannon Beiste (Dot-Marie Jones), Kurt's and Finn's married parents Burt Hummel (O'Malley) and Carole Hudson-Hummel (Rosemont), Emma's parents Rose and Rusty Pillsbury (Valerie Mahaffey and Don Most, respectively), football player Shane Tinsley (Tinker) and hockey player Rick Nelson (Rock Anthony). With Sam joining the synchronized swim team, actors were to be cast for the team coach and three swimmers, all of whom "have the potential to become recurring", though only two swimmers received co-starring credits in the episode. The swim team coach, Roz Washington, a bronze-medal Olympian, is being played by reality show personality NeNe Leakes.

The episode features six performances, including a mash-up of the songs "Moves Like Jagger" by Maroon 5 featuring Christina Aguilera and "Jumpin' Jack Flash" by The Rolling Stones sung by McHale, "We Found Love" by Rihanna featuring Calvin Harris sung by Michele and Rivera, and "Summer Nights" from the musical Grease with lead vocals by Overstreet and Riley. Michele sings "Without You" by David Guetta featuring Usher, and she, Riley, Rivera and Ushkowitz perform a rendition of the Roberta Flack cover of "The First Time Ever I Saw Your Face". The 5th Dimension's cover of "Wedding Bell Blues" is performed by Mays with backing vocals by Jones and Lynch.

== Reception ==
=== Ratings ===
"Yes/No" was first broadcast on January 17, 2012 in the United States on Fox. It received a 3.1/8 Nielsen rating/share in the 18–49 demographic, and attracted 7.50 million American viewers during its initial airing, an increase from the 3.0/8 rating/share and 7.13 million viewers of the previous episode, "Extraordinary Merry Christmas", which was broadcast on December 13, 2011. In Canada, 1.61 million viewers watched the episode on the same day as its American premiere. It was the twelfth most-viewed show of the week, up one slot and 10% from the 1.46 million viewers who watched "Extraordinary Merry Christmas" five weeks earlier.

In the United Kingdom, "Yes/No" first aired on March 1, 2012, and was watched on Sky 1 by 805,000 viewers. It was the first new episode broadcast in the UK in two and a half months, and viewership was down over 15% from "Extraordinary Merry Christmas", which attracted 952,000 viewers when it aired on December 15, 2011. In Australia, "Yes/No" was broadcast on February 17, 2012. It was watched by 556,000 viewers, which made Glee the eleventh most-watched program of the night, up from fifteenth the week before. The viewership was up over 15% from the previous episode, "Extraordinary Merry Christmas", which was seen by 481,000 viewers.

=== Critical reception ===
"Yes/No" received mixed reviews from critics. Robert Canning of IGN gave it a "good" rating of 7 out of 10, and noted "hit and miss musical performances, random quirky and funny bits, and storytelling choices that kind of sort of work". TVLine's Michael Slezak was more enthusiastic, and said it was the "best episode" of the third season; he credited both Helen Mirren and "some righteous plot development that stays true to core characters". Jen Chaney of The Washington Post commented that Glee had "returned to its frequent habit of dropping plot twists on us that come out of nowhere", and MTV's Kevin P. Sullivan wrote that the episode's "promising bright spots couldn't escape from under the weight of the show's typical mistakes".

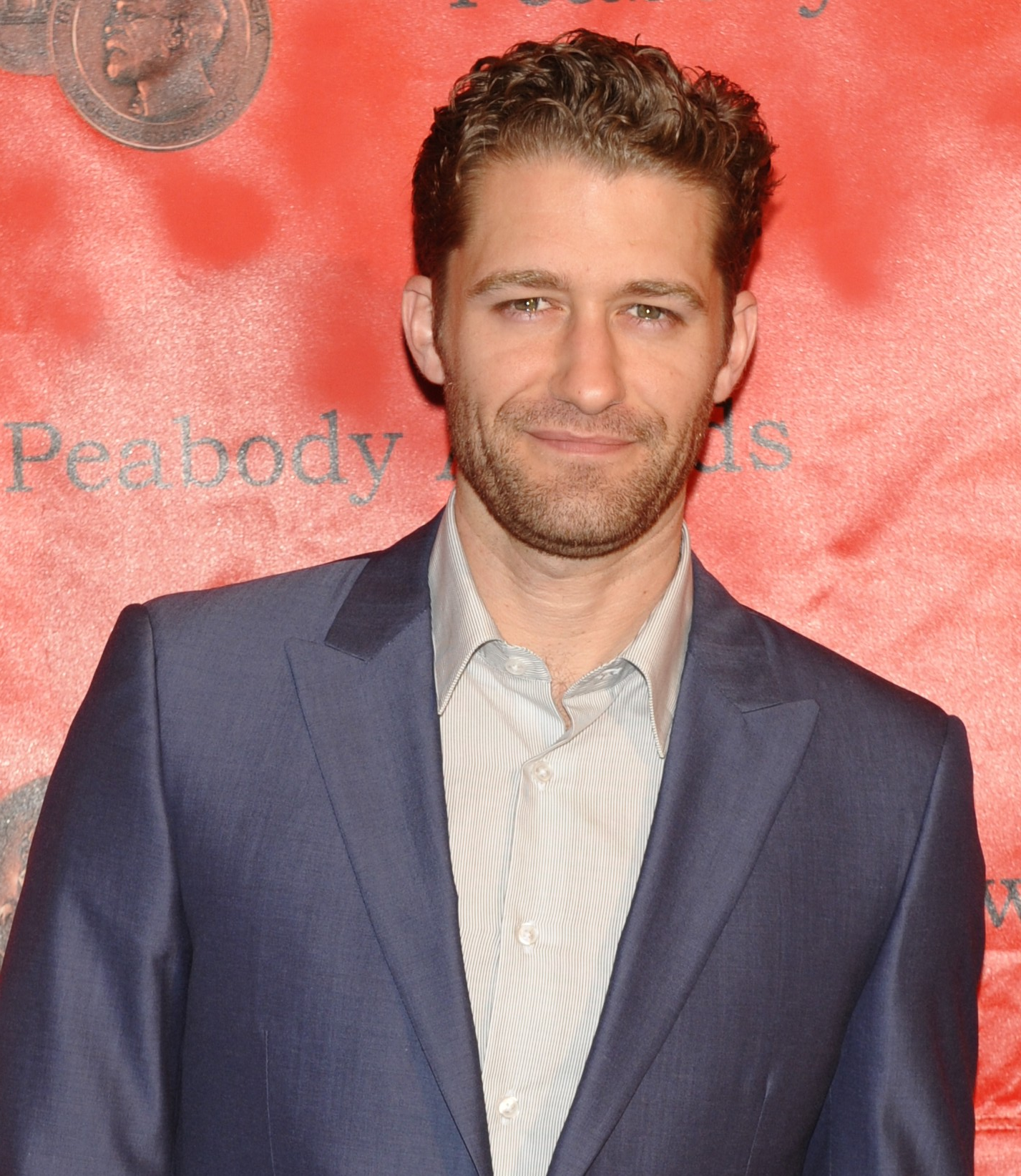
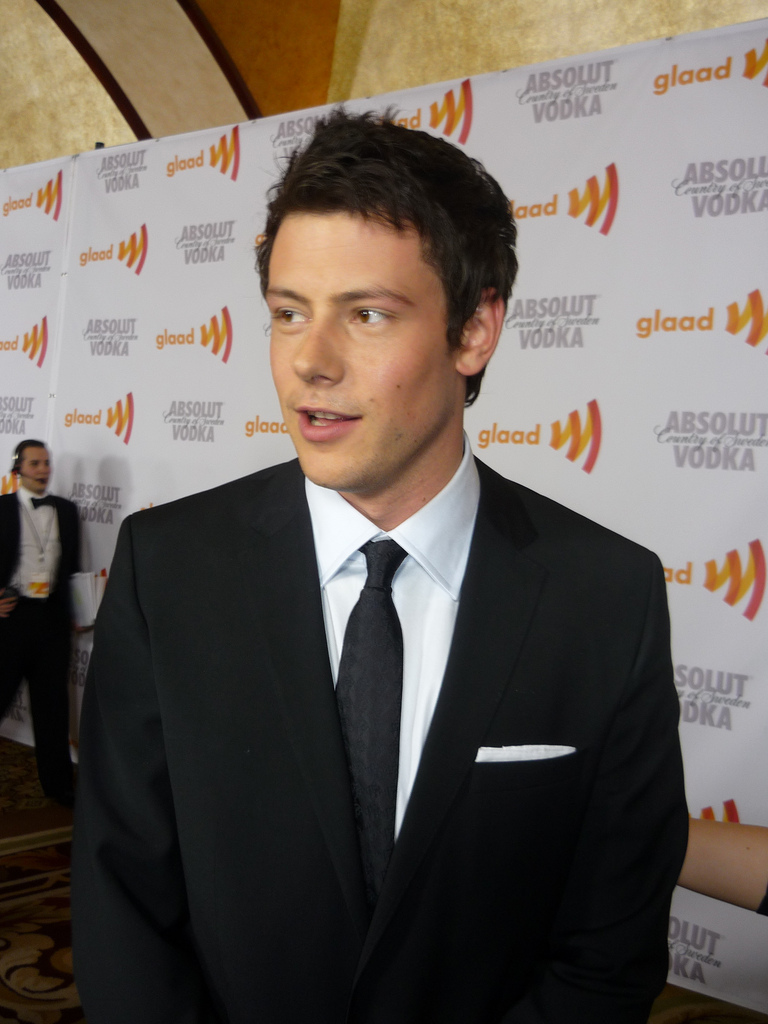
The scene where Will (Matthew Morrison, left) asked Finn (Cory Monteith, right) to be his best man was severely criticized by reviewers

Reviewers were unhappy with most of the marriage storyline that involved Will, though they seemed satisfied with Emma's portion of it. Emily VanDerWerff of The A.V. Club said Will acted like a "jackass" throughout and called the storyline "so pathetic and sad", words echoed by Entertainment Weekly's Joseph Brannigan Lynch, who wrote, "When Schue told New Directions, 'You guys are my family,' I was a little sad for him and a lotta sad for his parents." John Kubicek of BuddyTV proclaimed, "Will desperately needs to make some grown-up friends", a sentiment echoed by HuffPost TV's Crystal Bell. Lynch was critical of the scene where Will tells Emma they cannot marry because of her illness: he felt "using the phrase 'it's hopeless' in reference to her mental disorder" was too extreme. To James Poniewozik of Time, the episode showed "how the series has squandered the opportunity to make Will into a person".

There was broad agreement regarding the scene where Will asks Finn to be his best man: not one reviewer approved. Lynch called it "questionable" and said it crossed a "line of weirdness", Slezak and TV Guide's Kate Stanhope felt it was inappropriate, if not unethical, and Bell said the actual request was the episode's "biggest WTF?! moment". Will's statement that Finn had taught him "more about being a man" was met with incredulity. Slezak declared "Finn has a lot of growing up to do before he's really a man", and Sullivan wrote that since Finn acted "like a petulant man-boy" on the show, Will must have been referring to events in "a season of Glee that didn't air". Finn did receive some praise from Lesley Goldberg of The Hollywood Reporter, however; she called the sequence where he discovers the truth about his father "one of Cory Monteith's best scenes yet", and Slezak described it as "beautifully handled" by Monteith. Finn's marriage proposal to Rachel at the end of the episode was controversial. Reviewers thought it was a bad idea—Kubicek declared, "No one in high school should get engaged"—but Poniewozik wrote that it "made a lot of sense for Finn" as a character, and VanDerWerff said the scene "worked" for him.

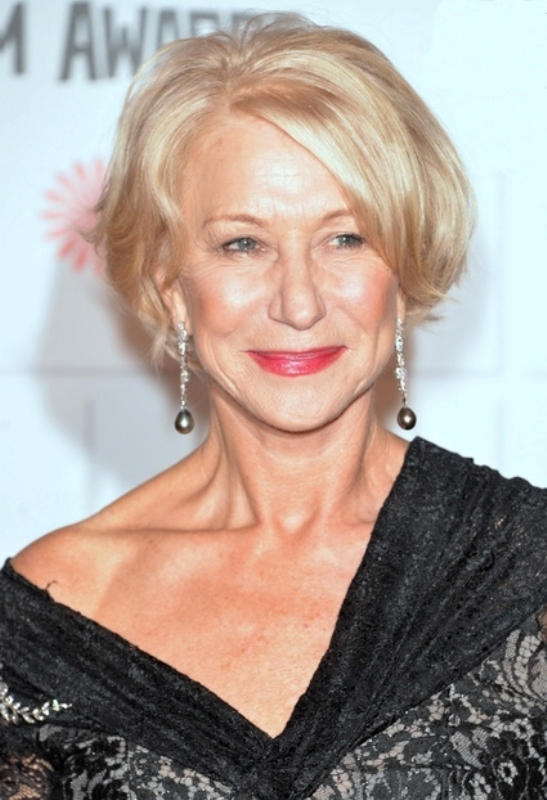
Helen Mirren (pictured) was acclaimed as the mental voice of Becky Jackson's thoughts.

Becky's storyline was acclaimed by most reviewers. Canning called it "exceptional" and "the most emotional and satisfying of the episode". Poniewozik also praised it, and wrote, "Artie and Becky's arc, on the other hand, really worked: it was sweet, uncomfortable and messy in the way that Glee does well." He continued, "it played out as it did not just because of Artie and Becky's condition but because of what they’re like as people". VanDerWerff said the story was "handled with just the right level of pathos", and Slezak praised the writers for turning Becky "into a fully realized character, while confronting head-on the dashed hopes and disappointments that can be a reality for a person with Down Syndrome". Sullivan wrote, "The plot touched on a universal experience, unrequited love, from a very Glee perspective, the treatment of handicapped people as people. It ended on an appropriate down note and reaffirmed Sue and Becky's touching dynamic." Bell liked Sue in this episode, as she was helping the plot, which in turn made her one-liners "added treats rather than overdone cliches". The use of Helen Mirren to voice Becky's thoughts was highly praised. Poniewozik called it "the kind of ridiculous-but-weirdly-logical move I love from Glee", and Lynch said it "was one of the most charming treats this show has offered in a while". Sullivan wrote that "both actresses turned in great performances that elevated the episode significantly". Not all reviewers agreed, however: Futterman called Mirren's vocal cameo "bizarre", and although Kubicek thought Mirren was "pretty darn hilarious", he said the "Becky having a crush on Artie" story arc made him feel "as uncomfortable" as the members of New Directions, and stated, "It's easy to say that everyone should just treat her like they treat everyone else, but actually doing it is somewhat problematic."

The cameo appearance of NeNe Leakes as Coach Roz Washington received plaudits from most reviewers. Poniewozik described her as "pretty damn excellent", and Votta wrote, "She only has one generally pointless scene but is arguably the best part of the whole episode." Raymund Flandez of The Wall Street Journal said Leakes "does well", and Bell stated "she actually wasn't that bad". Kubicek, however, while he liked the writing for the character, wrote that Leakes was "an embarrassingly terrible actress".

=== Music and performances ===
The opening number of the show received the most disparate reviews from critics. Kubicek was one of the most enthusiastic about "Summer Nights", and wrote, "This is the kind of ridiculous, over-the-top, hilariously cheesy stuff I want to see from Glee all the time." He was also pleased that Rory was given solo lines, and Sugar was "being embraced as a part of the group". Lynch thought that "Amber Riley and Chord Overstreet harmonize surprisingly wonderfully", and gave this "easily the most fun number of the episode" an "A−". Stanhope said that "the energy is infectious and you can feel the sparks between the former pair", but the performance was "way too much of a copycat" of the original Grease scene, while Flandez said that the two leads "lacked chemistry" and that the number was "inexplicable". VanDerWerff was similarly unimpressed: "dumb and unnecessary". Chaney wrote that the number "was a high-energy, cute way for the show to mark its comeback", but said that Rory "sounded flat" on one of his lines, and Sam "couldn’t quite hit" the ending high note in the song, and graded it a "B".

"Wedding Bell Blues" was described by Bobby Hankinson of The Houston Chronicle as "the perfect combination of a great song, plot relevance, and Princess Beatrice hat". Stanhope agreed with him on all three points, and added that it was "a great pick for [Jayma Mays'] vocals". Slezak described those vocals as "a breath of dewy spring air" and gave the song an "A", but Lynch thought Emma was not "much of a singer" and gave the number a "B−", though he said "the curiosity of backup vocals from Coach Beiste and Sue Sylvester made this entirely worthwhile". Poniewozik characterized the staging of the song as "phoned in". "The First Time I Ever Saw Your Face" was given an "A" by Lynch and an "A−" by Slezak; the latter called the vocals "pretty electrifying". Flandez said the song was "sublime" and complimented the lighting, the mood, and the direction by Eric Stoltz, and VanDerWerff described it as the episode's "best single number". While Futterman thought the performers sang with "controlled power", she felt "singing it dressed in black with tears rolling down" was funereal rather than bridal, and Sullivan called it an "odd song choice" that was made "worse" by "Lea Michele's cry-singing". Chaney gave the song her lowest grade of the episode, a "C−", and characterized it as a "flagrant eye-watering fest".

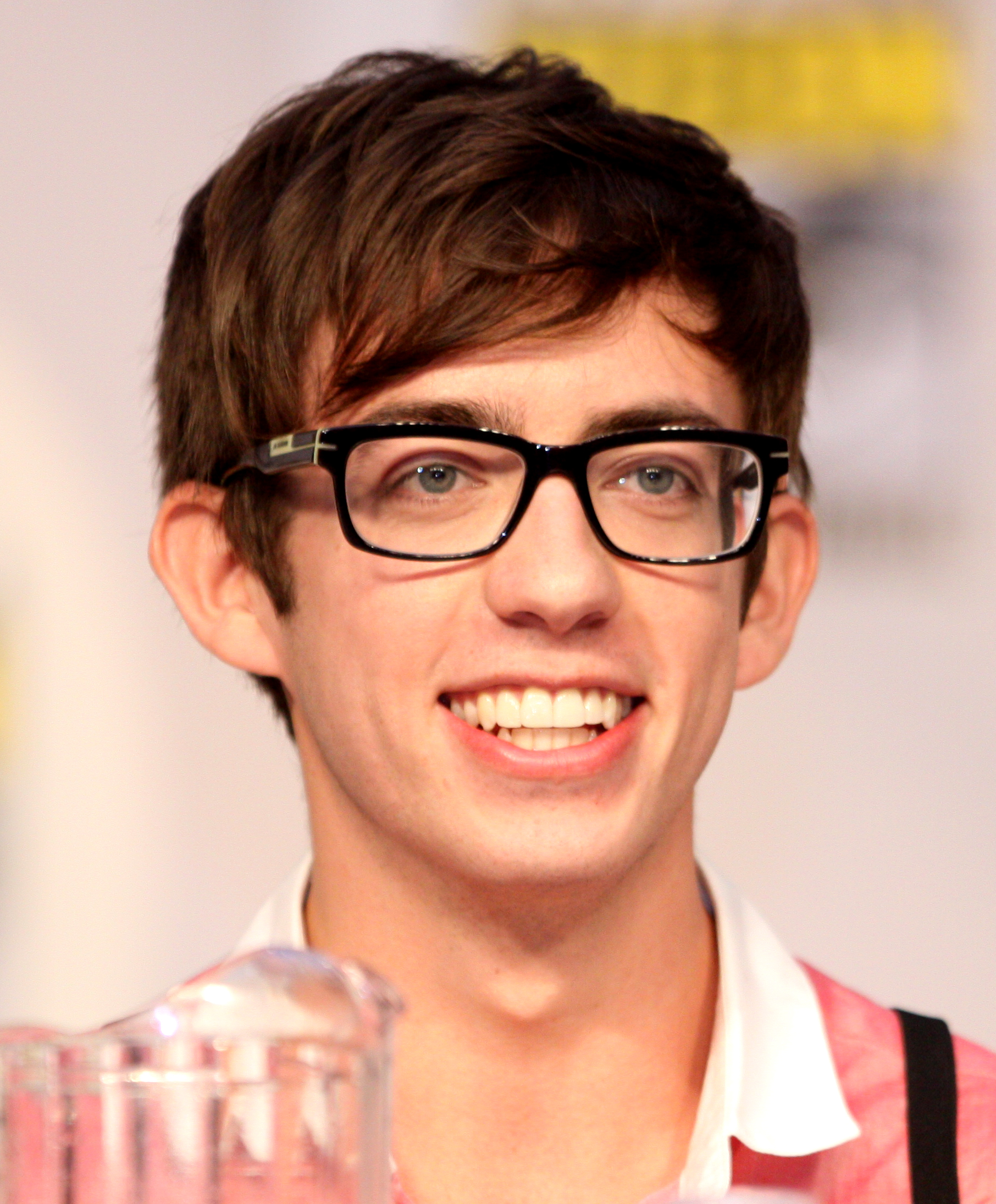
Artie (Kevin McHale, pictured) performed the mash-up of "Moves Like Jagger" and "Jumpin' Jack Flash" and was said to outshine "even Mike and Will who dance beside him".

Flandez called the "propulsive mash-up" of "Moves Like Jagger" and "Jumpin' Jack Flash" one of the episode's "highlights", and Billboard's Rae Votta said it was "impeccably choreographed by Glee's often unsung hero Zach Woodlee." She also lauded Artie's "Jagger moves while sitting in a chair" and said he "outshines even Mike and Will who dance beside him". Sullivan described Artie as "consistently awesome", and Slezak said it was "one of Artie’s more appealing musical moments this season" and gave it a "B". Lynch characterized the song as a "spunky diversion" and gave it a "B+", but he noted it was "not a good song for marriage proposals by any stretch of the imagination", a point also made by Rolling Stone's Erica Futterman, who said the number would have "fared much better as a stand-alone performance". While Chaney liked Will and Mike's "moves", she felt there was "far too much quick cutting to shots of Morrison in a tank top" and gave the song a "B−"; Slezak and VanDerWerff were also critical of these shots.

Futterman was impressed that in "Without You", Glee crafted a "cover to rival the original", and said it "totally works". Slezak called it a "vocally stunning reimagining" and gave it an "A−". Both Lynch and Chaney gave it a "B", and the latter wrote "I can't deny that she sang the heck out of it". Chaney was not so pleased with "We Found Love", to which she gave a "C". She wrote that it was "part old Esther Williams movie, part classic 'SNL' sketch with Harry Shearer and Martin Short and part music video for 'Magic' by the Cars. In short, it was kind of a train wreck." However, she and Stanhope, who said it was "way too fast-paced", were in the minority. Lynch called it "sheer pleasure" and gave it an "A−", and Slezak was even more enthusiastic with an "A+" grade and described it as a "sublimely, ridiculously, excessively terrific production number" which he placed "in the show's all-time Top 10". VanDerWerff praised the "nice sense of visual spectacle", and Hankinson called it "really fantastic" and "something different". Futterman, after she admitted to her "unabashed love" of the song, noted that the show had "found the trifecta of a current song that both fits the overall theme of the show and the characters singing it".

=== Chart history ===
Five of the six singles released from the episode, which included a total of seven cover versions due to the "Moves Like Jagger / Jumpin' Jack Flash" mash-up, debuted on the Billboard Hot 100. "Without You" debuted at number twenty-eight, followed by "We Found Love" at number fifty-six, the aforementioned "Moves Like Jagger / Jumpin' Jack Flash" mash-up at number sixty-two, "The First Time Ever I Saw Your Face" at number seventy and "Summer Nights" at number eighty-eight. The same five songs charted in Canada on the Canadian Hot 100 and in the same order on that chart: "Without You" at number twenty-nine, "We Found Love" at number fifty-five, "Moves Like Jagger / Jumpin' Jack Flash" at number fifty-nine, "The First Time Ever I Saw Your Face" at number seventy-eight and "Summer Nights" at number eighty-five. The sixth single, "Wedding Bell Blues", did not appear on either chart.
