= Extraordinary Merry Christmas =

- Glee episode
- Episode no.: Season 3 Episode 9
- Directed by: Matthew Morrison
- Written by: Marti Noxon
- Production code: 3ARC09
- Original air date: December 13, 2011

Guest appearances
- Chord Overstreet as Sam Evans; Damian McGinty as Rory Flanagan; E. E. Bell as Don Barowski

Episode chronology
← Previous "Hold On to Sixteen"	Next → "Yes/No"
- Glee season 3

"Extraordinary Merry Christmas" is the ninth episode and mid-season finale of the third season of the American musical television series Glee, and the fifty-third overall. Written by Marti Noxon and directed by Matthew Morrison (who played Will Schuester), the episode aired on Fox in the United States on December 13, 2011, and features the members of New Directions starring in a black-and-white Christmas television special that is presented within the episode itself.

Of the nine songs featured during the episode, eight had been released a month prior on the series' Christmas Album Volume 2. The episode takes its name from the original song "Extraordinary Merry Christmas", written for Glee by the show's executive music producer Adam Anders, song producer Peer Åström, and Shelly Peiken. The remaining eight songs are covers, and all nine were released as singles. Reviewers generally praised the music in the episode.

Although reviewers were polarized in their views of the episode as a whole, the special within the episode received mostly favorable comments, though the rest of the episode was deemed light on plot. Some aspects of the framing sequences were criticized, such as Rachel's excessive demands for Christmas presents despite the fact that she is Jewish. Upon its initial airing, this episode was viewed by 7.13 million American viewers and garnered a 3.0/8 Nielsen rating/share in the 18–49 demographic. The total viewership was up marginally from the previous episode, "Hold On to Sixteen".

== Plot ==
Sue (Jane Lynch) recruits the glee club to sing at a homeless shelter where she will be volunteering to distract her from the first Christmas without her sister Jean, who died earlier in the year. Finn (Cory Monteith) tells Rachel (Lea Michele) that all he wants for Christmas is her. Rachel replies that he is also all she wants, but also gives Finn a long list of Christmas present suggestions. Her dialogue, "All I want is what I have coming to me. All I want is my fair share" is a verbatim homage to Sally's Christmas list scene with Charlie Brown in the Christmas classic, A Charlie Brown Christmas. Just as Charlie Brown is with Sally, Finn is appalled by how much Rachel wants, though she assures him that five of the items are enough. When she later hints that an early gift would not be amiss, he surprises her with the donation of a sow in her name to needy Africans. Rachel is unhappy, reminds Finn that she is a vegan, and recommends that he stick to her list to avoid embarrassment, while pointedly mentioning earrings.

New Directions celebrates the holidays as Mercedes (Amber Riley) sings "All I Want For Christmas Is You". Rory (Damian McGinty) dedicates the song "Blue Christmas" to his family; this is his first Christmas away from them. Sam (Chord Overstreet) offers to take Rory home with him to show him a true American Christmas. Glee club director Will Schuester (Matthew Morrison) announces that New Directions has been asked to create a holiday special for the local PBS station, with Artie (Kevin McHale) as director. The station manager agrees to Artie's concept—a black-and-white homage to both Star Wars Holiday Special and the "Judy Garland Christmas Special", to feature hosts Kurt (Chris Colfer) and Blaine (Darren Criss) welcoming their friends for suave banter and happy, cheerful songs. Rory will play Itchy the Holiday Elf and recite "Frosty the Snowman". Sam points out that "Frosty" does not have a happy ending, and that a little sadness is also part of Christmas. Artie only wants to present the "merry" part and will be rewriting Frosty to fit, so Sam decides not to participate. Sue interrupts a rehearsal for the show to reconfirm that New Directions will be singing at the homeless shelter on Friday, but the special is also set for Friday. Artie asks to reschedule, but Sue says they are already expected and is adamant: it must be Friday night. The club members decide to do the broadcast, and Sue leaves in disgust.

Kurt and Blaine lead off the Glee Holiday Spectacular by performing "Let It Snow"; Rachel and Mercedes arrive and sing "My Favorite Things" with their hosts; Finn and Puck (Mark Salling) show up as not-quite-real Star Wars characters and perform "Santa Claus Is Coming to Town"; and "Christmas Wrapping" is sung by Brittany (Heather Morris), with backup by Santana (Naya Rivera), Tina (Jenna Ushkowitz), Mike (Harry Shum, Jr.) and several Cheerios. When Rory as Itchy arrives, the others are dismayed when he says he will not be reading "Frosty the Snowman"; in a second allusion to A Charlie Brown Christmas, he instead reads the biblical nativity story from the Gospel according to Luke.

Quinn (Dianna Agron) and Sam are at the homeless shelter with Sue, helping to serve the rapidly disappearing meal, when New Directions arrives, late, with more food and some presents. The glee club sings "Do They Know It's Christmas?" for the people there. Back at McKinley, Rachel has a change of heart and names Finn's gift sow "Barbra". Finn does give her the earrings she wanted, but she ultimately returns them and he returns the iPod she gave him: they donate the money to the Salvation Army kettle manned by Sam and Rory, and stay to help.

== Production ==
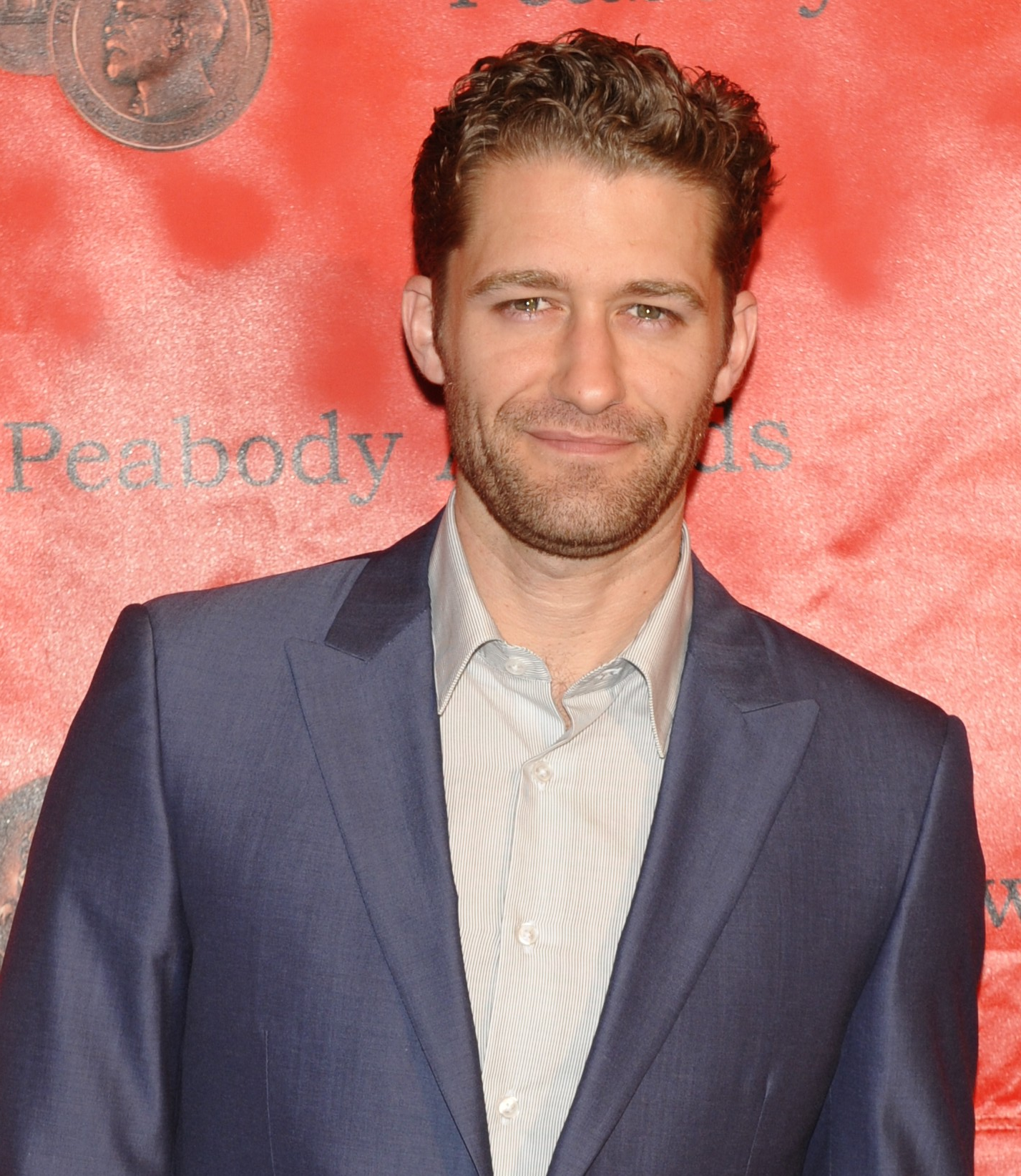
The episode marked the directorial debut of Glee star Matthew Morrison (pictured).

The episode is the directorial debut of Glee star Matthew Morrison, who plays Will Schuester. He announced that he would be directing an episode "during an acoustic set and Q&A at LA's Grammy Museum for their Spotlight series" in late September 2011. He ultimately did not direct the eighth episode as originally planned, but this ninth one instead.

It is also the second annual Glee Christmas episode, with nine songs, eight of which come from the second annual Glee Christmas soundtrack album, Glee: The Music, The Christmas Album Volume 2. The only song that was not included on the album is "My Favorite Things" from the musical The Sound of Music, which was released as a single—as were all the other songs from the episode—and features Michele, Riley, Colfer and Criss. Although Morrison stated in an interview that the episode would include ten songs, one of them, "Santa Baby", sung by Rivera and previously released on the soundtrack, had to be cut "because the episode was running long", though a video of it was made available online the week after the episode aired. A scene of Blaine giving a ring to Kurt, shown in promotional photos for the episode, was also cut, and it was reported the night the episode aired that this scene would "be included in the Season 3 DVD". Instead, a YouTube video containing the scene was tweeted by Ryan Murphy on August 1, 2012.

The episode itself has the same name as an original song on that album, "Extraordinary Merry Christmas", which was written for Glee by the show's executive music producer Adam Anders, song producer Peer Åström, and Shelly Peiken, and is sung on the second Christmas soundtrack album by Michele and Criss, who also perform it in the episode. The episode also includes covers of eight songs, seven of which are from the soundtrack album: Mariah Carey's "All I Want for Christmas Is You" performed by Riley, Elvis Presley's "Blue Christmas" sung by McGinty, Joni Mitchell's "River" performed by Michele, "Let It Snow" sung by Criss and Colfer, "Santa Claus Is Coming to Town" performed by Monteith and Salling—but not by Samuel Larsen, who sings the song with them on the album—in the Bruce Springsteen and the E Street Band version, The Waitresses' "Christmas Wrapping" sung by Morris, and the Band Aid fundraiser "Do They Know It's Christmas?" performed by New Directions. The filming of this last piece, shot on Thanksgiving eve, involved "lots of children". All proceeds from the cast's version of "Do They Know It's Christmas?" will go to the Band Aid Trust Charity.

In an interview with Jimmy Kimmel, Morrison revealed that the episode "features a Christmas special within the episode that's a throwback and a tribute to the Star Wars Holiday Special and the Judy Garland Christmas Special", which are "combined in a way". Lucasfilm Ltd. gave permission for Glee to use the Star Wars character Chewbacca for the sequence; the actor who currently plays Chewbacca was flown in for a day of filming, though "he doesn't sing" in the episode.

The episode serves as the mid-season finale. Before the third season started, co-creator Brad Falchuk announced that it would be structured as two "mini-seasons" that mimic school semesters, and this episode ends the fall semester. Filming began on November 10, 2011, while the eighth episode, "Hold on to Sixteen" was still shooting; they continued in parallel through November 21, 2011, when episode eight completed filming. "Extraordinary Merry Christmas" completed filming on November 29, 2011. Recurring guest stars that appear in the episode are New Directions members Rory Flanagan (McGinty) and Sam Evans (Overstreet).

== Reception ==
=== Ratings ===
"Extraordinary Merry Christmas" was first broadcast on December 13, 2011, in the United States on Fox. It received a 3.0/8 Nielsen rating/share in the 18–49 demographic, and attracted 7.13 million American viewers during its initial airing, with an identical rating/share and only marginally higher audience compared to the 7.11 million viewers of the previous episode, "Hold On to Sixteen", which was broadcast on December 6, 2011. The episode was broadcast that same evening in Canada, where 1.46 million viewers watched the episode, the lowest number of viewers for the third season to that point. It was the thirteenth most-viewed show of the week, down two slots and over 9% from the 1.61 million viewers who watched "Hold On to Sixteen" the previous week.

Viewership increased in the United Kingdom, though it declined in Australia. In the United Kingdom, "Extraordinary Merry Christmas" was watched on Sky1 two days later by 952,000 viewers, growing over 9% from "Hold On to Sixteen" the week before, when 869,000 viewers were watching. In Australia, "Extraordinary Merry Christmas" was broadcast on February 10, 2012. It was watched by 481,000 viewers, the lowest of the third season thus far, and Glee was the fifteenth most-watched program of the night, down from thirteenth the week before. The viewership was down over 15% from the previous episode, "Hold On to Sixteen", which was seen by 567,000 viewers.

=== Critical reception ===
Critics were polarized in their reactions to the episode, though most seemed to agree that it was, as The Washington Post's Jen Chaney put it, "heavy on holiday music and exceedingly light on plot". Raymund Flandez of The Wall Street Journal called it a "jumbled mess" and BuddyTV's John Kubicek a "total mess", though the latter also characterized it as "absurdly entertaining". Kevin P. Sullivan of MTV said it was "one of the most confusing episodes of Glee ever". TV Guide's reviewing team of Denise Martin and Kate Stanhope described it as "oddly mesmerizing, hilarious and kinda weird, even for Glee", and Amy Reiter of the Los Angeles Times wrote that "chipper and the sad were in perfect balance and the kitsch factor was high".

Several reviewers approved of the black-and-white television special that took up half of the episode. Indeed, most of these would rather the episode had consisted entirely of the special: IGN's Robert Canning regretted that "the good stuff" was bookended with "inconsequential and awkward real world stories", and Erica Futterman of Rolling Stone "would have preferred" the whole episode to be the show-within-a-show. The Atlantic's Kevin Fallon called the middle segments "a love letter to the Judy Garland specials it honored" and said it was a "bold move" for a series with mainstream youth appeal, and Rae Votta of Billboard thought the "homage was a shining example of what Glee can do when given the leeway to be strange and different", and was another who wished it could have run the entire episode. Kubicek, on the other hand, was left cold by the "utterly pointless and plotless Christmas special", and Flandez called the acting during it "haphazard". The Huffington Post's Crystal Bell said it was "just as weird as it sounds", but she, like Fallon, described the special as a "bold move". Emily VanDerWerff of The A.V. Club pointed out that while it was a "pitch-perfect parody" of the Judy Garland and Star Wars specials, the inherent problem is that the originals were "already pretty awful", so that to be "an accurate parody, Glee has to be awful".

Rachel's characterization, especially her Christmas greed even though she is Jewish, was singled out for criticism in many reviews. VanDerWerff wrote that the episode "hinged around Rachel being really excited about what she was going to get for Christmas, even though she's Jewish", and her end-of episode shout of "Happy Hanukah" a "last minute patch job" to "stay true to the characters as they were at one time". Sullivan also discussed her characterization and noted that she was "a character who makes a point of her Jewish heritage often". He added, "she was basically horrible and played against character the entire episode, so she could eventually realize that she was awful and change her ways." Bell criticized Rachel's list of gifts, such as "spray tan and teeth whitening", as "back to square one" after her nose-job storyline in the second season. Finn's contribution of a charity pig in Jewish Rachel's honor was deemed "wrong on at least two levels" by Chaney.

A few reviewers were pleased by the new friendship between Rory and Sam. Kubicek said it was "officially my favorite thing from the entire third season of Glee", and Bell approved, though she said "the writers don't know how to use" Rory, and was disappointed that his brotherly relationship with Finn had "fizzled". VanDerWerff singled out Rory's reading from the bible, which was, as Canning phrased it, "ripped from A Charlie Brown Christmas" when Linus reads the same passage, as one that "irks" him most, "because it takes a perfectly beautiful little moment from a nearly perfect TV special" and makes it a "cutaway gag".

Sue's sudden change of behavior in this episode caused Kubicek to ask when she had become "the moral compass on this show", and Bell wondered, "how does Ryan Murphy expect us to like a character that continually changes", given that whenever she seems to go "in a new direction, she heads back to her same glee club-hating ways". Kubicek also made that point that while "Sam and Quinn seemingly did the right thing by choosing the shelter over the special", the others did eventually show up, which "muddled" the message.

=== Music and performances ===
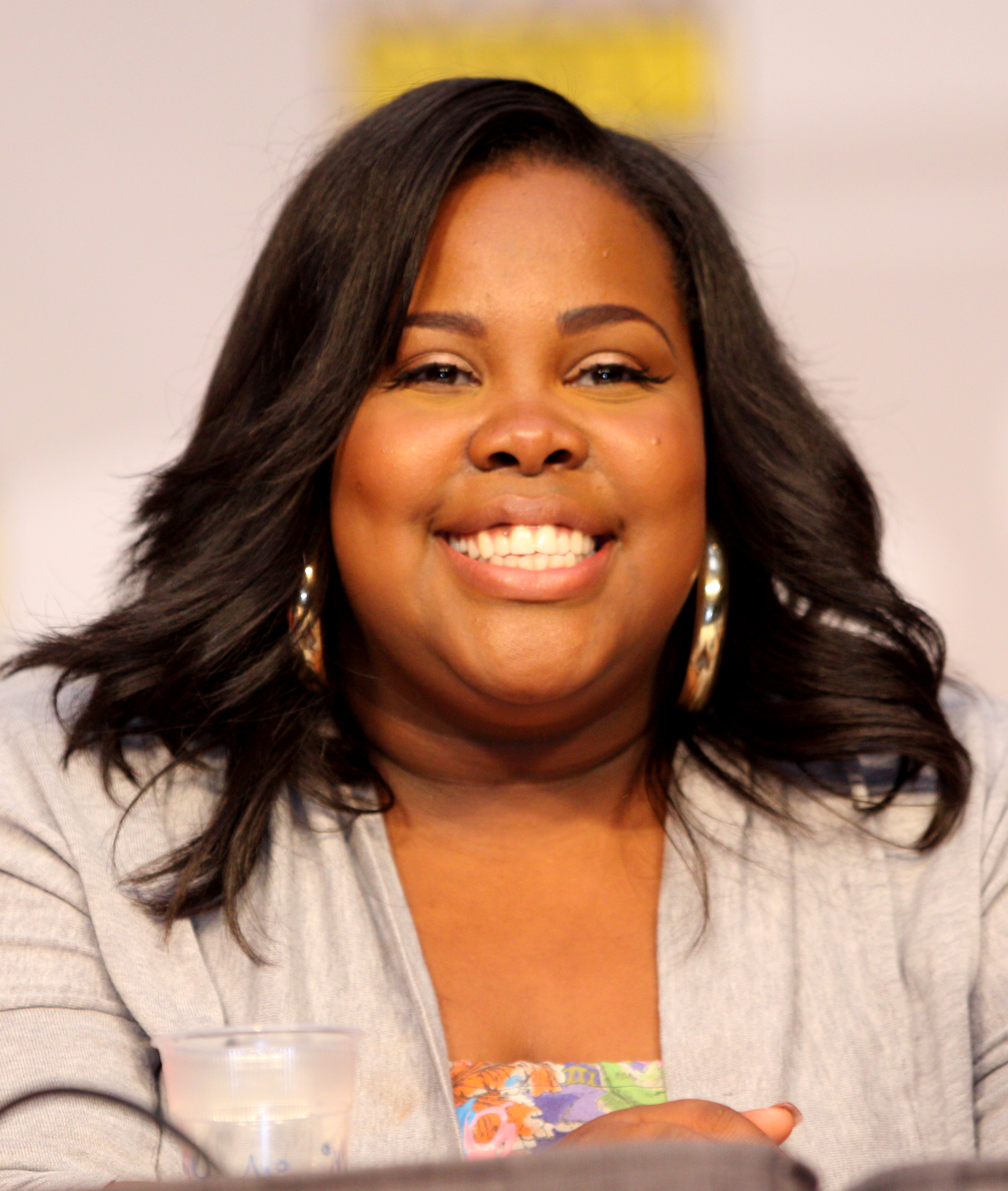
Amber Riley (pictured) as Mercedes gave an "utterly joyful" performance of "All I Want for Christmas Is You".

The reviewers generally praised the music in the episode. Votta wrote that "musically this episode was one of the season's overall strongest", though Flandez made reference to the "humdrum holiday songs". Sullivan pointed out that it was "about the songs and only the songs", and Kubicek felt it was a "blatant" attempt to sell Christmas albums. Chaney noted that the opening number, "All I Want for Christmas Is You", "sounded much more vibrant and fresh with Mercedes" on lead, Futterman called it "utterly joyful", and it was the favorite song of the episode for Martin and Stanhope. Votta declared that "Amber Riley shines throughout the episode, but none more than here where she commands attention", and Sullivan called it a "nice rendition" that was nevertheless presented with "some incredibly awkward cuts from the original song".

Entertainment Weekly's Abby West wrote that "Rory's crooning take" of "Blue Christmas" was "smooth and lovely", and gave it a "B+", and Flandez agreed with the in-show assessment that it was "mournfully beautiful". Futterman said that the song "perfectly suits his vocals", but was unimpressed with Rory "standing awkwardly" through the song; Michael Slezak of TVLine noted the static staging and filming of the number and gave it a "C", and while Chaney said he sang it "just fine", she said he "didn't sell it", and gave it a "C+". Rachel's rendition of "River" also received divergent assessments. Chaney and Slezak both gave it an "A−": the former remarked that she "knows how to make the emotion in a song soar", and the latter said "damn if she didn't sound amazing", though he pointed out the incongruity of Rachel having just stated after Rory's song that uptempo and jolly is the way to go, only to sing this song, which is anything but. VanDerWerff agreed that there was "no good reason for Rachel to sing it", and Flandez called it a "forgettable version". Futterman's conclusion was that "it feels a little phoned in and doesn't emotionally connect".

The original song for which the episode is named, "Extraordinary Merry Christmas", received mostly decent marks from reviewers: Slezak gave it a "B" and called it "fun but slight", and Sullivan said it was "okay, which is high praise for a "Glee" original". Bell noted that "Blaine and Rachel sound great together", and Martin and Stanhope also praised their "spirited performances", though they said the song sounded "very generic". Kubicek was harsher, and wrote that it was an "embarrassingly awful original song", but while Votta characterized it as "a weird techno jumble", she also called it "undeniably catchy".

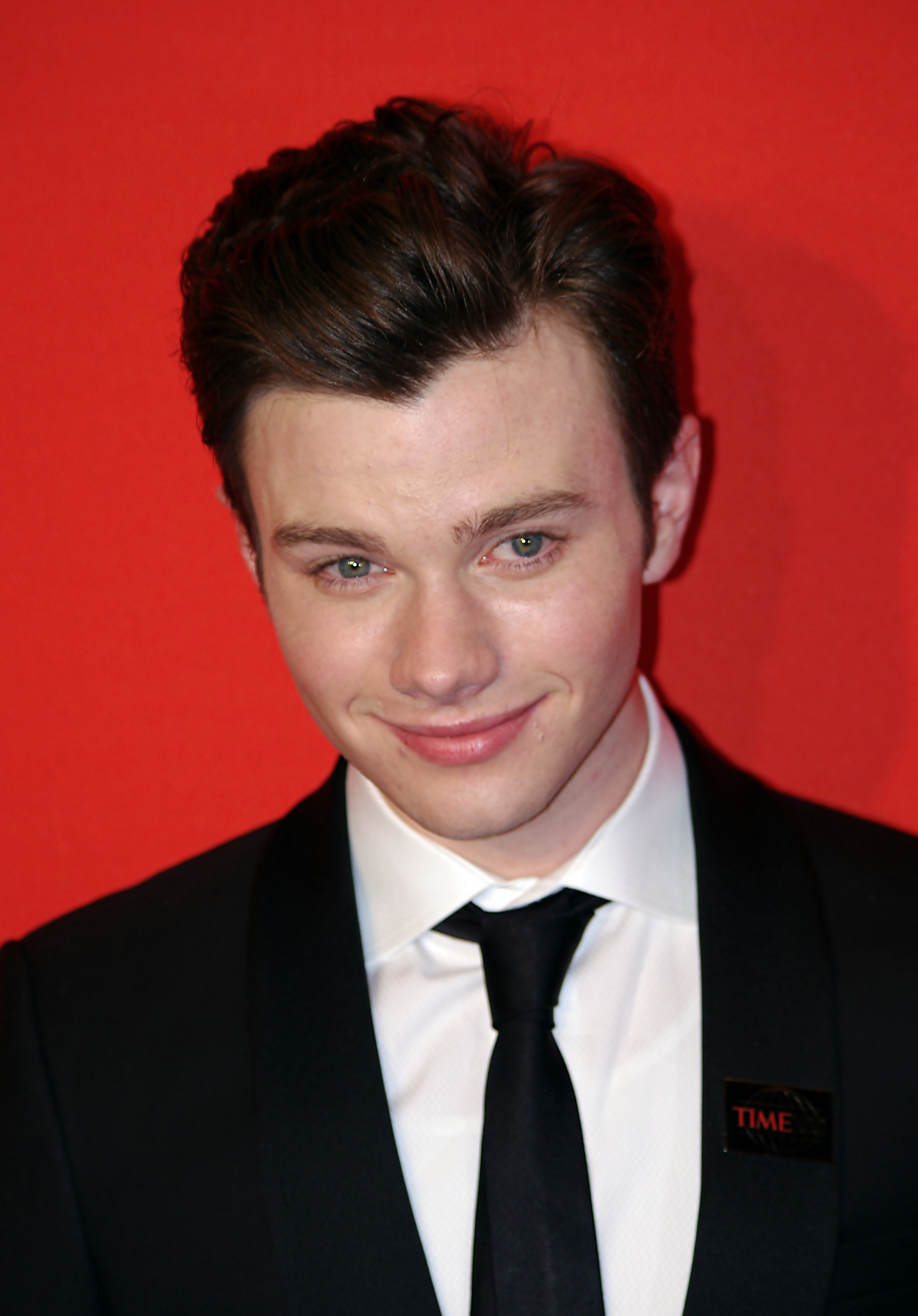
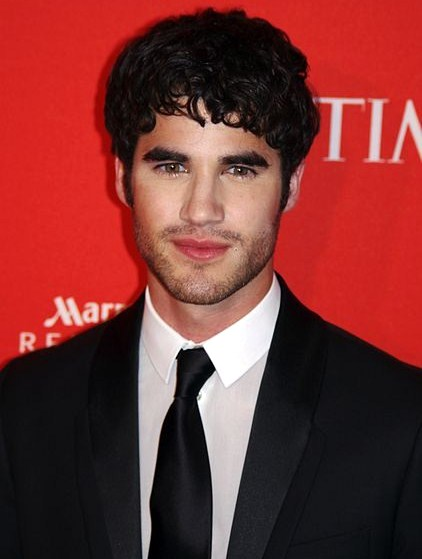
The duet of "Let It Snow" by Kurt (Chris Colfer, left) and Blaine (Darren Criss, right) was widely praised

The opening number of the black-and-white "special", "Let It Snow" featuring Blaine and Kurt, garnered the most praise. Slezak gave it an "A" and described it as a "jazzy, uptempo take on the seasonal classic with gorgeous harmonies and retro dancing", and said it rivaled their Christmas duet from 2010, "Baby, It's Cold Outside". While Vicki Hyman of The Star-Ledger enjoyed the number, she preferred the previous year's offering; Flandez called "Let It Snow" an "admirable job". Futterman characterized it as "both effortless and full of seasonal spirit", and Votta said it was "a spot-on tribute to male duets of yesteryear with that knowing undercurrent of romance even when it's not explicit". Chaney gave it an "A", but she wondered at the inclusion of the next song, "My Favorite Things", since it "technically isn't a holiday song". The number was also not as well received as many of the others: Bell described it as taking "a turn for the worse", Hyman noted that it "didn't do too much for me", and Kubicek said it "seemed to drag on and on and on with no real purpose". However, West called it a "wonderful effort" and Slezak wrote that "a little Rodgers and Hammerstein is always welcome at any party"; both reviewers gave the performance a "B+".

Finn and Puck's rendition of "Santa Claus Is Coming to Town" was received tepidly. Votta referred to it as "mildly rocking", and Slezak and Chaney both gave it a "B−": the former said it was "fun" but "not deeply exciting" and the latter called it "competent" but "unmemorable". Martin and Stanhope wrote that it "still packs a cheesy and powerful Christmas punch"; it was their third favorite number. Their second favorite was the next number, "Christmas Wrapping", sung by Brittany, which Flandez described as "quite good" and Hyman said "could only have been improved by a little more Mike Chang dancing". VanDerWerff credited Morris with being "a gifted mimic when singing" though he called the performance "listless", and Slezak, who gave the song an "A−", wrote "I was just bummed that the song got cut short before my favorite line: 'A&P has provided me with the world's smallest turkey.'"

A number of reviewers had a problem with "Do They Know It's Christmas?" being set in a homeless shelter; both Hyman and West called it an "odd choice", and Slezak said he "struggled" with the location. Chaney called the lyrics "condescending", and found the juxtaposition of the singers' smiling faces and the phrase "clanging chimes of doom" to be "weird". The song itself was given good marks: Hyman called it the episode's "best performance" because "they each brought something special to it", and Futterman said that New Directions "channels the emotion of the original for a fitting vocal cap to the night". Both Slezak and West gave it a "B+", and the former declared that "they sang the bejeezus out of it".

=== Chart history ===
Of the eight cover versions and one original song that were released as singles, one cover debuted on US and Canadian top 100 charts: "Do They Know It's Christmas?" debuted in the US at number ninety-two on the Billboard Hot 100, and at number eighty-five on the Billboard Canadian Hot 100. Glee: The Music, The Christmas Album Volume 2, which had been released in the US on November 15, 2011, was the source of eight of the nine songs—only "My Favorite Things" was not included on that album—and it moved up to number thirteen on the Billboard 200 that same week, its fifth on that chart, having been number nineteen the previous week, though it originally debuted at number six.
