= Hold On to Sixteen =

- Glee episode
- Episode no.: Season 3 Episode 8
- Directed by: Bradley Buecker
- Written by: Ross Maxwell
- Production code: 3ARC08
- Original air date: December 6, 2011

Guest appearances
- Idina Menzel as Shelby Corcoran; John Schneider as Dwight Evans; Chord Overstreet as Sam Evans; Damian McGinty as Rory Flanagan; Vanessa Lengies as Sugar Motta; Keong Sim as Mike Chang, Sr.; Tanya Clarke as Mary Evans; Lindsay Pearce as Harmony; Grant Gustin as Sebastian Smythe

Episode chronology
← Previous "I Kissed a Girl"	Next → "Extraordinary Merry Christmas"
- Glee season 3

"Hold On to Sixteen" is the eighth episode of the third season of the American musical television series Glee, and the fifty-second overall. The episode title is from a line in John Mellencamp's song "Jack & Diane". Written by Ross Maxwell and directed by Bradley Buecker, the episode aired on Fox in the United States on December 6, 2011, and featured the return of Sam Evans (Chord Overstreet) to McKinley High and New Directions, and their participation in the Sectionals show choir competition.

Eight songs are covered in the episode, which include three songs originated by members of the Jackson family and performed by New Directions: The Jackson 5's "ABC", Janet Jackson's "Control" and Michael Jackson's "Man in the Mirror". The performances were reviewed favorably for the most part, the notable exception being Toby Keith's "Red Solo Cup", which was given a mixed reception. The episode as a whole was also given a mixed reception, with some reviewers criticizing the ease and rapidity of Sam's return, though others felt the show was back on track after developments in recent episodes.

Five of the seven tracks from the episode—three of four singles, and two of three from the soundtrack album Glee: The Music, Volume 7—charted on the Billboard Hot 100 and the Canadian Hot 100, with the cast's "We Are Young" debuting at numbers twelve and eleven, respectively, selling 137,000 downloads in the United States. Upon its initial airing, this episode was viewed by 7.11 million American viewers and garnered a 3.0/8 Nielsen rating/share in the 18–49 demographic. The total viewership and ratings for this episode were down from the previous episode, "I Kissed a Girl".

== Plot ==
New Directions member Quinn (Dianna Agron) plans to get Shelby (Idina Menzel) fired for sleeping with a student, Puck (Mark Salling). She wants to reclaim Beth, the baby she gave up to Shelby for adoption, and sabotage Shelby's rival Troubletones glee club prior to Sectionals competition. Rachel (Lea Michele) insists that Quinn will ruin Beth's life if she takes her from her true mother, Shelby.

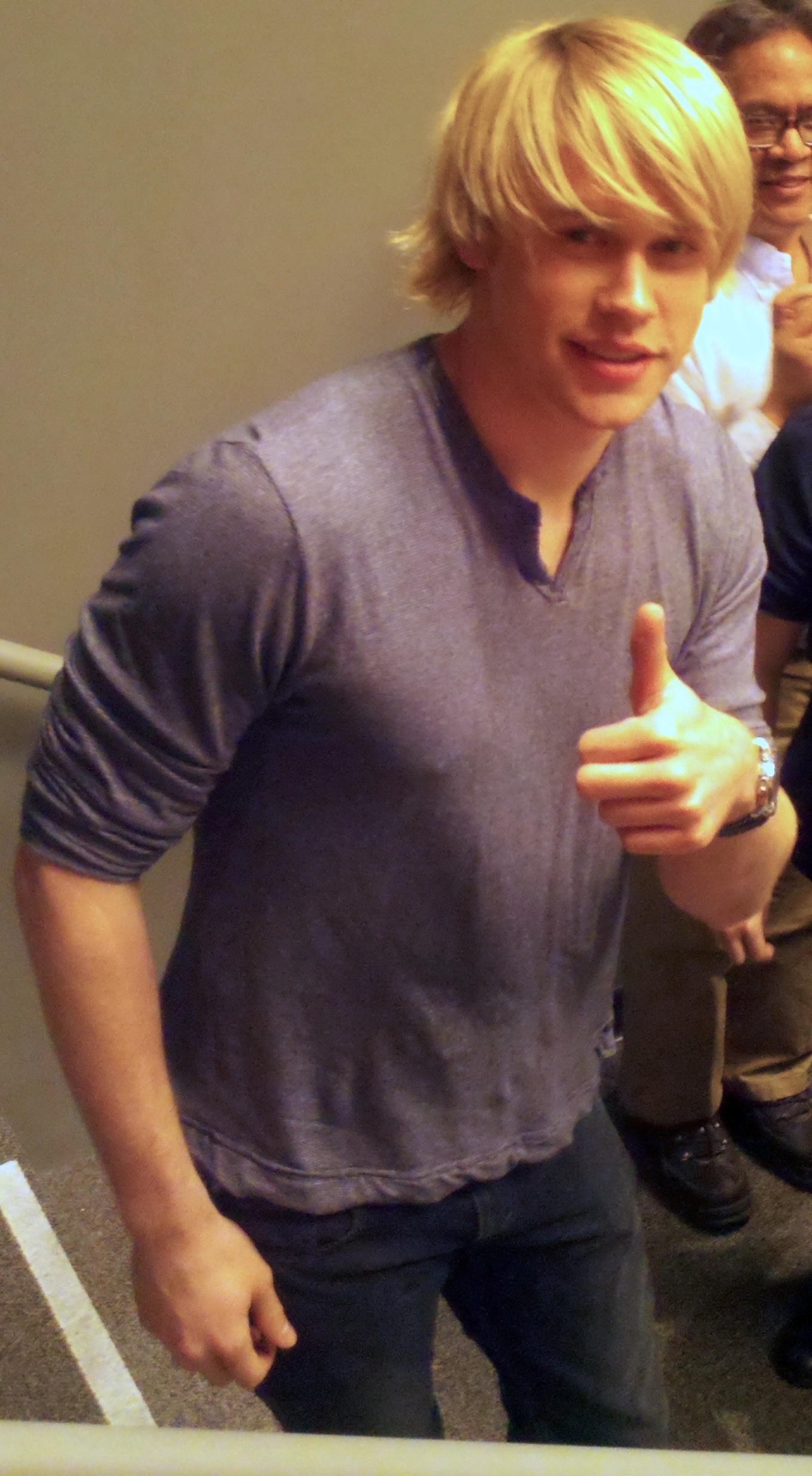
Sam Evans (Chord Overstreet, pictured) returns to McKinley High in this episode.

New Directions needs twelve members to compete, but has only nine with Rachel suspended from school. Finn (Cory Monteith) and Rachel travel to Kentucky to ask Sam (Chord Overstreet) to come back to McKinley High for Sectionals. Unknown to his parents, Sam is dancing at a strip joint to help pay family expenses; he wants to return to McKinley, and they agree to let him go. Upon his return, Quinn attempts to reconnect with him to help her reclaim Beth, but he refuses her. He tells his former girlfriend Mercedes (Amber Riley) that he intends to woo her back from her new boyfriend, Shane (LaMarcus Tinker). For the final two performers they need, New Directions recruits the bassist and drummer from their regular instrumental support, the William McKinley Jazz Ensemble, to sing and dance.

Blaine (Darren Criss) complains to his boyfriend Kurt (Chris Colfer) that Finn always dismisses his suggestions in glee club. Sebastian (Grant Gustin) interrupts them. With Blaine elsewhere, Kurt warns Sebastian to stay away from Blaine, but Sebastian declares his intention to steal him. Back in the choir room, Blaine suggests some dance choreography, but Sam wants instead to add moves that "sell sex". Blaine angrily declares that he is "not for sale", gets into a fight and storms off. Finn goes after him and finds Blaine pummeling a punching bag. Blaine demands to know why Finn has been so hostile since he transferred to McKinley, and Finn admits he was jealous of Blaine's talent and apologizes.

Tina (Jenna Ushkowitz) is appalled when Mike (Harry Shum, Jr.) tells her he will not be applying to dance schools as planned, but has instead applied to Stanford's pre-med program to please his father. Tina tries to intervene with Mike's father (Keong Sim), but he remains convinced that dancing is too risky a path for Mike.

Sectionals this year are being held in the McKinley auditorium, and the Unitards—led by Harmony (Lindsay Pearce)—perform first. Quinn leaves the auditorium to tell Principal Figgins (Iqbal Theba) about Shelby and Puck, but Rachel urges her to warn Shelby first. Quinn confronts Shelby, who tells her that she is resigning from McKinley and apologizes to her. The Troubletones perform next with a mash-up of "Survivor" and "I Will Survive". New Directions then performs "ABC", "Control" and "Man in the Mirror", and Mike and Tina are surprised to see Mike's father in the audience. Afterward, he tells the couple that he now understands that dancing is Mike's passion, and Mike should apply to the best dance schools. Mike thinks he missed deadlines, but Tina reveals that she secretly sent in an application. The two happily hug. New Directions wins Sectionals, and the Troubletones come in second.

Quinn decides not to reveal Shelby's secret for Beth's sake. She convinces Rachel and the director of New Directions, Will Schuester (Matthew Morrison), to promise to feature the Troubletones members in all future New Directions competitions if they agree to be in the group. She tells Mercedes (Amber Riley), Santana (Naya Rivera) and Brittany (Heather Morris) of the deal, and all three, along with Sugar (Vanessa Lengies), come to the auditorium to join with New Directions in singing "We Are Young".

== Production ==
The episode was written by Ross Maxwell and directed by Bradley Buecker, and its title comes from a line in John Mellencamp's song "Jack & Diane". Filming began on November 2, 2011, following completion of the seventh episode the previous day, and finished on November 21, 2011. All but the first eight days were shot in parallel with the ninth episode, "Extraordinary Merry Christmas", which began filming on November 10, 2011.

Overstreet, who played New Directions member and football team player Sam Evans in the second season, returns for the first time this season, and will have a multi-episode recurring role. Sam's parents will appear for the first time in this episode; his father is played by John Schneider, and his mother by Tanya Clarke. Series co-creator Ryan Murphy also stated that Pearce returns as Harmony in this episode, and Gustin will appear for the second time as Sebastian Smythe, a member of the Dalton Academy Warblers.

Other recurring guest stars appearing in the episode include teacher Shelby Corcoran (Menzel), exchange student and New Directions member Rory Flanagan (Damian McGinty), Troubletones member Sugar Motta (Lengies) and Mike's father Mike Chang Sr. (Sim).

Eight songs are covered in the episode, which include three songs originated by members of the Jackson family and performed by New Directions: The Jackson 5's "ABC", with leads by Ushkowitz, Colfer, Shum and Agron; Janet Jackson's "Control", with leads by Kevin McHale and Criss, and a spoken introduction by Agron; and Michael Jackson's "Man in the Mirror", with leads by McHale, Monteith, Salling, Criss and Overstreet. Those three songs are included on the soundtrack album Glee: The Music, Volume 7. The five other songs are Toby Keith's "Red Solo Cup" sung by Overstreet; a mash-up of Gloria Gaynor's "I Will Survive" and Destiny's Child's "Survivor", performed by the Troubletones featuring leads by Rivera and Riley; "Buenos Aires" from Evita featuring Pearce; and fun.'s "We Are Young" sung by a reunited New Directions. "We are Young" is featured on the soundtrack album Glee: The Music, The Graduation Album.

== Reception ==
=== Ratings ===
"Hold On to Sixteen" was first broadcast on December 6, 2011, in the United States on Fox. It received a 3.0/8 Nielsen rating/share in the 18–49 demographic, and attracted 7.11 million American viewers during its initial airing, down from the 7.90 million viewers and 3.2/8 rating/share for the previous episode, "I Kissed a Girl", which was broadcast on November 29, 2011. In Canada, where the episode was broadcast the same day, 1.61 million viewers watched the episode, which made it the eleventh most-viewed show of the week, down three slots and 10% from the 1.79 million viewers who watched "I Kissed a Girl" the previous week.

Viewership also declined in the United Kingdom and Australia. In the United Kingdom, "Hold On to Sixteen" was watched on Sky1 two days after its US premiere by 869,000 viewers, a decrease of over 20% compared to "I Kissed a Girl" the week before, when 1.09 million viewers were watching. In Australia, "Hold On to Sixteen" was broadcast on February 3, 2012. It was watched by 567,000 viewers, which made Glee the thirteenth most-watched program of the night, up from fifteenth the week before. The viewership, however, was down slightly from the previous episode, "I Kissed a Girl", which was seen by 575,000 viewers.

=== Social media ===
The night the episode debuted, many topics related to the show appeared in the top ten trending topics on Twitter. At one point, Glee executive producer Dante Di Loreto tweeted "6 trending topics?!", indicating that six of the nine available slots were filled by Glee-related topics, but soon posted a correction: "Ha! OK, 8. I forgot #WhiteChocolate was us!" A review of the episode by Jenna Mullins of E! Online posted the same evening stated that "within five minutes" of his appearance, the returning Sam Evans was "trending all over Twitter".

=== Critical reception ===
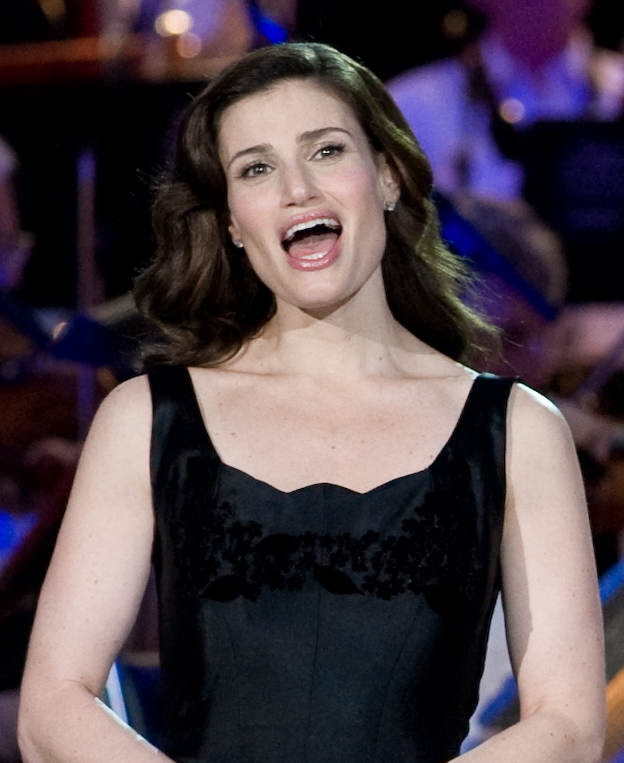
Reviewers were highly critical of glee club director Shelby Corcoran (Idina Menzel, pictured) for her failure to acknowledge that she was wrong to sleep with a student.

"Hold On to Sixteen" received a mixed reception from reviewers, though the music was more favorably received. Robert Canning of IGN called it "very underwhelming" and gave it an "okay" rating of 6.5 out of 10; he noted that competition episodes such as this one spend more time on performance, and deemed the non-performance segments "blase". Rolling Stone's Erica Futterman characterized "the moral of this week's story: embrace your youth" as "overkill", but noted that once the competition began, the episode "succeeded in spite of itself". Amy Reiter of The Los Angeles Times called it a "feel-good episode" that came as a "huge relief" after the show "had lost its moral footing these last few weeks", and AOLTV's Crystal Bell said it gave her "some hope for the rest of the season". Rae Votta of Billboard summarized the episode this way: "Overall, it was a Glee that felt like the plots were dealt with as fast as humanly possible to cram in as much singing and dancing as we can."

Many reviewers took issue with the implausible nature of several plot points. Jen Chaney of The Washington Post decried the "lack of basic logic" in Sam being "able to so easily transfer back to McKinley", Entertainment Weekly's Abby West pointed out the "considerable amount of paperwork" required for a "minor to move in with noncustodial guardians in another state and register for school", and Michael Slezak of TVLine was bothered that Sam's parents did not establish who those guardians would be, and how this would affect him academically. Futterman pointed out that "Mr. Schuester has again failed to pick a set list ahead of time" despite "weeks of pretense about preparing for sectionals". Both Slezak and MTV's Kevin P. Sullivan were unimpressed with Quinn's late-in-the-game thought to apply to so competitive a school as Yale.

There was some puzzlement expressed by several reviewers, including Raymund Flandez of The Wall Street Journal and Votta, as to why Finn would think Sam had been such a great performer to begin with that it was so important to bring him back. Despite that, Votta was pleased by Sam's return as was Bell, who thought it was one of the more enjoyable aspects of the episode. Sam's scene with Blaine, however, was met with criticism, but of Blaine's characterization, not Sam's: BuddyTV's John Kubicek pointed out that Blaine "essentially calls Sam a whore" and that "he's like a completely different person". Vicki Hyman of The Star-Ledger described the scene as "pretty out of character" for Blaine, and The Houston Chronicle's Bobby Hankinson said that the entire subplot, including Finn's antagonism toward Blaine, was "so sloppily assembled" he was glad it was ended in the following scene. The confrontation between Kurt and Sebastian over Blaine was little remarked on—West enjoyed it, but said she had been hoping for more.

The end of the Quinn/Shelby/Puck triangle and of "crazy Quinn" was celebrated by Bell and Reiter. Several other reviewers, including Kubicek, Slezak and Hyman, were highly critical of Shelby's failure to acknowledge that she was in the wrong for sleeping with a student. Canning felt there was no possibility that Quinn would actually ruin Shelby and Beth's life, since she had failed to follow through in earlier episodes, so her threat to do so lacked drama and was "hollow".

Although Sullivan was enthusiastic about Shum, who he said had "emerged as a crux of the show", he was not happy with his character's "forced storyline" in the episode. Canning noted that Mike's storyline had "been a bit cliched all season", though it had been "fun to root for him", but he was puzzled by the lack of a "Mike Chang dance showcase" at the competition to justify his father's change of heart.

Rebecca Ford of The Hollywood Reporter was glad that the "tiresome" split glee clubs were now a single group again, though Flandez called the final scene "too neat to be an ending". While many reviewers, including Reiter, approved of the conclusion of most of the season's storylines in this episode, Canning called it a "nice little reset button for a season that started off with promise but has failed to deliver of late", and Kubicek wrote, "With the return of Sam, it's kind of like the first seven episodes of the season never even happened."

=== Music and performances ===
The episode's opening musical number, "Red Solo Cup", was given a mixed reception by reviewers. Chaney called it a "fun change of pace", though she wasn't fond of Toby Keith, who originated the song; Bell admitted she had never been "much of a Sam fan", but she thought Sam's version "was pretty great". Canning called the song a "terrible choice", and Ford wrote that it "fell unbelievably short". Futterman credited a "surprisingly natural country twang from Sam", but added that the "choir room performance feels mostly stale". Votta could find no sense in its inclusion, and called it the "weirdest song on "Glee" since 'Run Joey Run'", while Hankinson was harsher, and declared it to be his "least favorite Glee performance of all time". West, on the other hand, said the song was "perfect for Sam", and Overstreet's "smooth sultry voice nailed it".

Harmony's performance with the Unitards received good marks, if not overly enthusiastic ones. Chaney said it was "fine" and gave it a "B", while Futterman wrote, "Harmony brings Latin flair and proves that she's legit vocal competition, but the song as a whole has the weird effect of feeling both over-the-top and watered down at the same time." Kubicek called the performance "fairly forgettable", while West and Slezak felt that it was not a show-choir presentation, though both gave it a "B+" grade: Slezak termed it a "showcase for a sololist with some jaunty backup dancers", and West likened it to a "lounge act". Both Votta and Hyman were impressed with Harmony: Hyman characterized her as "pretty awesome", and Votta said she was a "fantastic singer".

Sullivan was amazed that the "I Will Survive" / "Survivor" Troubletones performance "made the mash-up fun for a second time", and Bell called it "awesome". Chaney characterized the Mercedes and Santana vocals as "strong", as did Votta, but both felt it was not as good as the "Rumour Has It" / "Someone Like You" mash-up two episodes prior. Slezak gave the performance an "A", and said, "I loved that the Troubletones broke free of the standard-operating glee-club choreography, and that there’s another legendary duet to add to the Sancedes oeuvre." Flandez wrote that it was "superbly well done and well choreographed", except for the jumping jacks. Votta thought Blaine and Finn's triumphant fist bump during the number seemed warranted, though Slezak and Sullivan seemed unconvinced.

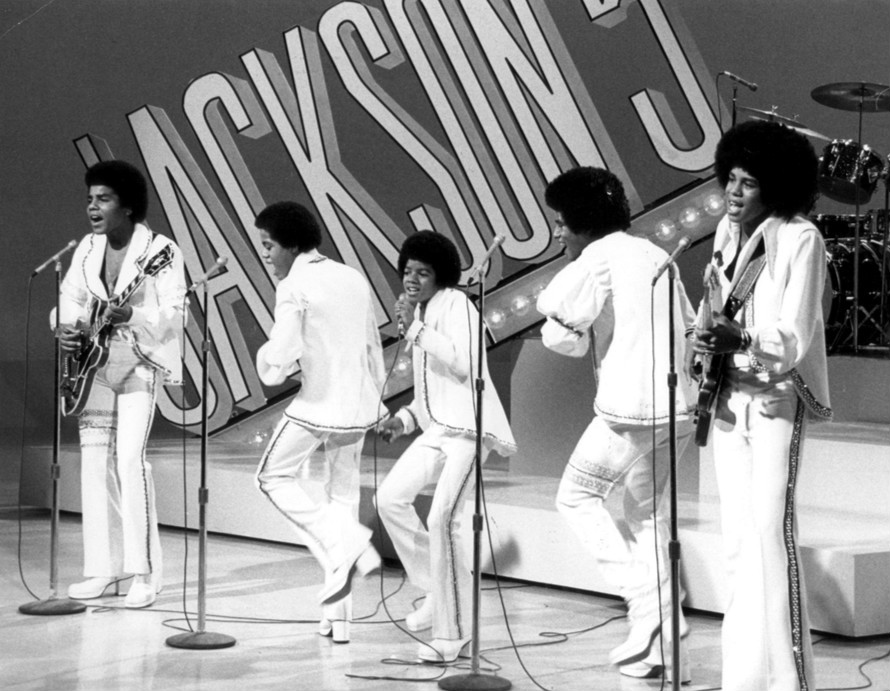
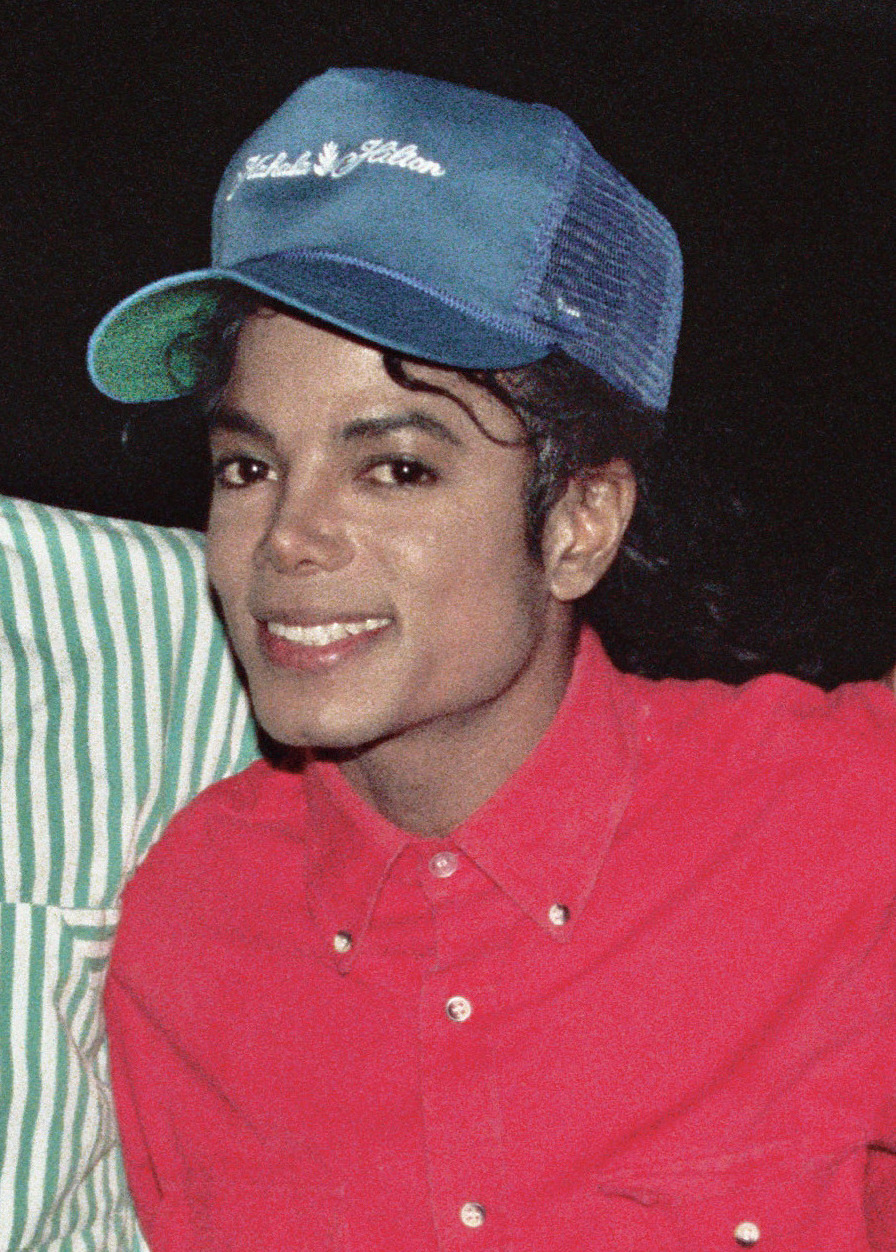
The show's covers of songs by the Jackson 5 (left), Janet Jackson, and Michael Jackson (right) were generally lauded by reviewers.

The New Directions set of three Jackson family numbers was favorably reviewed by most critics, though they didn't necessarily agree on which songs were most effective. Bell couldn't decide whether she enjoyed these three songs or the Troubletones mash-up more, and West felt the "choreography on the whole thing was stellar", and graded it an "A+". Votta singled out "ABC", which demonstrated "what a lovely singer Tina is", and Kubicek said he enjoyed it "mostly because Tina deserves more singing time, and I love the fact that Mike is now an actual singer who gets his own solos". Chaney called it "a solid performance" and gave it a B+, while Futterman wrote that it "felt like a flashback to the New Directions' group performances of yesteryear, when it was all about an over-the-top, feel-good attitude". The dancing in "Control" was highlighted in many reviews: Hyman and Slezak were complimentary, but Chaney wrote that the "choreography seemed a little awkward and occasionally out of sync", that it was "the least effective of the three Jackson numbers" and added that for her "this felt dated when it could have been retro-fresh"; she graded the song a "C". However, Futterman made mention of the "slick dance moves", and Votta noted that the "jazz band guys" were "holding their own with the background dancing through the whole number". However, for Kubicek, the song "definitely brought down the energy at the middle of their performance". Bell characterized the final song as "an amazing 'Man in the Mirror' cover", and Chaney said it was "the best of their three songs", and gave it an "A−". However, Slezak wrote that it "proved to be a tonally jarring ending to the performance".

"We Are Young" was received with near-universal enthusiasm. Slezak called it "totally joyous fun" and Chaney said it was "the most effortlessly joyful moment of the night"; the two handed out "A−" and "A" grades respectively. Futterman felt it was performed "with silly spirit", and was "another throwback to simpler and successful Glee moments". Hankinson thought it was the best musical number of the night, even if "it was more than a little reminiscent of their performance of 'Dog Days Are Over'", but Kubicek thought the earlier song was "a million times better". West called it a "great closing song", and Votta said "the finale singing was the best kind of 'Glee'".

=== Chart history ===
Three of the four singles released from the episode, which included a total of five cover versions thanks to the "Survivor / I Will Survive" mash-up, debuted on the Billboard Hot 100, including the Glee Cast's sixth-highest song ever on that chart as of that date, "We Are Young", which debuted at number twelve on sales of 137,000 downloads in the US. It had a "Hot Shot Debut" on the Canadian Hot 100, and charted higher than in the US at number eleven. As of March 7, 2012, the song had sold "360,000 digital copies". In the United States, the aforementioned "Survivor / I Will Survive" debuted at number fifty-one, and "Red Solo Cup" debuted at number ninety-two; in Canada, the two songs debuted at number forty-seven and number ninety-nine, respectively. In addition, two of three covers from the episode that were only made available on the soundtrack album Glee: The Music, Volume 7—which was released the same day as the episode was broadcast—appeared on the Hot 100: "Man in the Mirror" at number seventy-six, and "ABC" at number eighty-eight. This made a total of five debuts on the Hot 100. The same two songs also appeared on the Canadian Hot 100: "Man in the Mirror" at number eighty-four, and "ABC" at number ninety-three, which also totalled five debuts on that chart. Neither "Buenos Aires" nor "Control" appeared on these US or Canadian charts.

The original versions of two of the songs covered in the episode also charted on the Hot 100 that week. "We Are Young" by fun. featuring Janelle Monáe debuted in the United States at fifty-three and in Canada at sixty-nine. Toby Keith's "Red Solo Cup" had already been on those charts, but was cited as the greatest "digital gainer" on both of them, and rose to seventeen in the United States from thirty-five, and twenty-nine in Canada from sixty-eight. Subsequently, "We Are Young" was featured in a Super Bowl commercial, and became the first song by the originating artist to reach number one on the Billboard Hot 100 after appearing on the show, attaining that position on the chart for the week of March 17, 2012.
