= Homecoming (Glee) =

- Glee episode
- Sam, Puck, and Rachel perform A-ha's "Take On Me"
- Episode no.: Season 6 Episode 2
- Directed by: Bradley Buecker
- Written by: Ryan Murphy
- Production code: 6ARC02
- Original air date: January 9, 2015

Guest appearances
- Dianna Agron as Quinn Fabray; Heather Morris as Brittany Pierce; Naya Rivera as Santana Lopez; Mark Salling as Noah "Puck" Puckerman; Becca Tobin as Kitty Wilde; Jenna Ushkowitz as Tina Cohen-Chang; Max Adler as Dave Karofsky; Lauren Potter as Becky Jackson; Samantha Marie Ware as Jane Hayward; Marshall Williams as Spencer Porter; Noah Guthrie as Roderick; Billy Lewis Jr. as Mason McCarthy; Laura Dreyfuss as Madison McCarthy; Connor McCabe as Gabriel

Episode chronology
← Previous "Loser like Me"	Next → "Jagged Little Tapestry"
- Glee season 6

"Homecoming" is the second episode of the sixth season of the American musical television series Glee, and the 110th overall. The episode was written by series co-creator Ryan Murphy, directed by executive producer Bradley Buecker, and first aired on January 9, 2015 on Fox in the United States along with the previous episode, "Loser Like Me", as a special two-hour premiere.

The episode takes place in the days surrounding the homecoming at McKinley High, as Rachel Berry (Lea Michele) attempts to revive New Directions at McKinley with the help of Kurt Hummel (Chris Colfer), but Principal Sue Sylvester (Jane Lynch) continues to stand in her way. Rachel decides to bring back former New Directions members in an attempt to recruit new talent. Meanwhile, the first-ever female to attend Dalton Academy attempts to break into the Warblers.

== Plot ==
Blaine Anderson (Darren Criss), now coach of the Dalton Academy Warblers, meets the first-ever female student to attend Dalton, Jane Hayward (Samantha Marie Ware), who wants to audition to be a Warbler. Blaine, Rachel Berry (Lea Michele), now coach of New Directions being aided by Kurt Hummel (Chris Colfer), their friend Sam Evans (Chord Overstreet), and Will Schuester (Matthew Morrison), now coach of Vocal Adrenaline, agree to not sabotage any of the other's efforts in show choir. As Rachel searches for new talent, she brings in former New Directions members Puck (Mark Salling), Quinn Fabray (Dianna Agron), Santana Lopez (Naya Rivera), Mercedes Jones (Amber Riley), Brittany Pierce (Heather Morris), Artie Abrams (Kevin McHale), and Tina Cohen-Chang (Jenna Ushkowitz) for assistance.

Rachel briefly meets new transfer student Roderick (Noah Guthrie) but her enthusiasm scares him away. Blaine asks Rachel to train Jane for her upcoming Warbler audition. Kurt tries to get gay football player Spencer Porter (Marshall Williams) to join but Spencer turns the offer down. Jane auditions for the Warblers and does well, but she is denied membership by the other members as they are hesitant to change their status quo. Blaine vows to fight for Jane's admittance. Santana, Quinn, Artie, and Brittany perform for the Cheerios and catch the interest of siblings Mason McCarthy and Madison McCarthy (Billy Lewis Jr. and Laura Dreyfuss) while also reuniting with former New Directions member Kitty Wilde (Becca Tobin), but she has no interest in re-joining New Directions and openly discourages the other Cheerios from doing so.

Rachel hears a voice singing in the halls and discovers it to be Roderick. The former New Directions members convince him to audition, and he does so successfully, becoming the official first new member. Principal Sue Sylvester (Jane Lynch) attempts to bribe Spencer to sabotage New Directions but he refuses. Jane transfers to McKinley High and joins New Directions which infuriates Blaine, who sees this as a break of their vows not to sabotage, and he states their alliance is now over. Mason and Madison, who are karaoke champions, also join New Directions.

== Production ==
Returning recurring characters that appear in the episode include the former New Directions members Puck (Mark Salling), Quinn Fabray (Dianna Agron), Santana Lopez (Naya Rivera), Mercedes Jones (Amber Riley), Brittany Pierce (Heather Morris), Artie Abrams (Kevin McHale), and Tina Cohen-Chang (Jenna Ushkowitz), former bully Dave Karofsky (Max Adler) as the new love interest of Blaine, and Becky Jackson (Lauren Potter). Three new recurring characters were introduced: New Directions siblings Mason McCarthy and Madison McCarthy (Billy Lewis Jr. and Laura Dreyfuss), and former Dalton student and now New Directions member Jane Hayward (Samantha Marie Ware). The recently introduced character Roderick (Noah Guthrie) is now a New Directions member, while gay jock Spencer Porter (Marshall Williams) is undecided.

The episode features six musical cover versions. "Viva Voce" by The Rocketboys is briefly sung a cappella by Guthrie. A-ha's "Take On Me" is sung by McHale, Morris, Colfer, Riley, Salling, Agron, Michele, Overstreet, Rivera, and Ushkowitz. "Tightrope" by Janelle Monáe is sung by Ware and the Warblers. "Problem" by Ariana Grande is sung by McHale, Morris, Agron, and Rivera. Wilson Pickett's "Mustang Sally" is sung by Guthrie, Morris, Agron, and Rivera. "Home" by Edward Sharpe and the Magnetic Zeros is sung by McHale, Morris, Colfer, Riley, Salling, Agron, Michele, Overstreet, Rivera, Ushkowitz, Guthrie, Ware, Lewis Jr., and Dreyfuss.

Accompanying the music from this episode, the EP Glee: The Music, Homecoming was released on January 5, 2015.

== Reception ==
=== Ratings ===
The episode received 2.34 million viewers and a 0.7/2 on adult 18-49, making the sixth season premiere the least watched season premiere in the show's history.

=== Critical response ===
"Homecoming" was given positive reviews by critics. Lauren Hoffman from Vulture said that the episode's final number "Home" was "legitimately touching, although that might just be the camaraderie and hand-holding and actual fireworks". Christopher Rogers from Hollywood Life said that he "totally loved the season six premiere and feel that Glee's going to go out with a bang". The A.V. Club's Brandon Nowalk said that "Homecoming" was "classic Glee", and "by the end of the hour it commits to its four new characters so strongly I was as moved by the gesture as I was by the dawning realization that I actually like these new kids." Miranda Wicker from TV Fanatic expressed that she can't quit watching Glee. "Once the New Directions get in your blood they're there to stay", she said.
