= The Sue Sylvester Shuffle =

- Glee episode
- Episode no.: Season 2 Episode 11
- Directed by: Brad Falchuk
- Written by: Ian Brennan
- Production code: 2ARC11
- Original air date: February 6, 2011
- Running time: 49 minutes

Guest appearances
- Katie Couric as herself; Iqbal Theba as Principal Figgins; Dot-Marie Jones as Shannon Beiste; Romy Rosemont as Carole Hudson; Harry Shum, Jr. as Mike Chang; Chord Overstreet as Sam Evans; Darren Criss as Blaine Anderson; Telly Leung as Wes; Max Adler as Dave Karofsky; James Earl as Azimio; Scott Lincoln as the carnie cannon guy; Ashley Fink as Lauren Zizes; Lauren Potter as Becky Jackson

Episode chronology
| ← Previous "A Very Glee Christmas" | Next → "Silly Love Songs" |
- Glee season 2

"The Sue Sylvester Shuffle" is the eleventh episode of the second season of the American musical television series Glee, and the thirty-third episode overall. It was written by Ian Brennan, directed by Brad Falchuk, and was broadcast immediately following Super Bowl XLV on February 6, 2011 on Fox. In the episode, an effort to dispel student rivalry forces the McKinley High football team and glee club to unite. When cheerleading coach Sue Sylvester (Jane Lynch) withdraws her squad from the halftime show of a championship football game, the disparate groups must come together to perform a routine and win the game.

Reportedly the most expensive post-Super Bowl episode ever produced, "The Sue Sylvester Shuffle" cost $3–5 million. It featured over 500 extras, including an array of stunt artists. News anchor Katie Couric guest-starred as herself, provoking controversy by making a jibe about television personality Dina Lohan. The episode featured cover versions of five songs, including a dance performance of "California Gurls" by Katy Perry and a mash-up of Michael Jackson's "Thriller" with "Heads Will Roll" by the Yeah Yeah Yeahs. Series creator Ryan Murphy had considered using the episode as a musical tribute to Jackson. The performances were met with mixed reception from critics. With the exception of "California Gurls", each of the numbers were released as singles, available for download. The "Thriller / Heads Will Roll" mash-up was the highest charting in all regions, peaking at number seventeen in Australia.

In the US, the episode was watched by 26.8 million viewers, making it the most watched episode of Glee and was also the highest-rated scripted TV broadcast in three years. It received a mixed response from critics, who differed over its accessibility to the Super Bowl audience. Several criticized the repetitive theme of football versus glee club rivalry, finding "The Sue Sylvester Shuffle" below typical Glee standards.

== Plot ==
Sue Sylvester (Jane Lynch), the coach of the cheerleading squad, grows disillusioned with the sport, and in an effort to recapture her love for it, and for a publicity stunt, plans to fire Brittany from a cannon during the team's next competitive routine. The cheerios report Sue to Mr. Schuester and Principal Figgins. Meanwhile, football coach Shannon Beiste (Dot-Marie Jones) has the school football players join the glee club, New Directions, in order to dispel rivalry between the students. In revenge for opposition to her cannon plan, Sue has the cheerleading Regionals competition moved to the same night as a football championship game, so her cheerleaders will be unavailable for the halftime show, and forces the affected squad members to resign from the glee club. New Directions' director Will Schuester (Matthew Morrison) announces that the club members, including the football players, will perform the halftime routine, planning a mash-up of Michael Jackson's "Thriller" with "Heads Will Roll" by the Yeah Yeah Yeahs. He notices and encourages the talent of Dave Karofsky (Max Adler), a bully who has previously acted violently towards the glee club members and had a crush on Kurt. When the football players are attacked by members of the school hockey team, Karofsky convinces a number of the football players to quit the glee club, resulting in Beiste barring those players from the championship game.

To ensure that the game goes ahead, glee club members Rachel (Lea Michele), Mercedes (Amber Riley), Tina (Jenna Ushkowitz) and Lauren (Ashley Fink) join the football team. The game begins badly for the McKinley side, and when Tina is injured during a play, captain Finn Hudson (Cory Monteith) takes control of the situation. He has club member Puck (Mark Salling) convince the former football players to return, and convinces cheerleaders Santana (Naya Rivera), Brittany (Heather Morris) and his ex-girlfriend Quinn (Dianna Agron) to quit the cheer squad and perform at the halftime show. Only Karofsky refuses to participate, but when he sees the positive reaction the crowd has to the routine, he joins in himself. Beiste welcomes the football players back, and they go on to win the game by intimidating the opposing side, dressed as zombies from the halftime routine.

Sue's cheer squad loses at Regionals for the first time in seven years, and she is named Loser of the Year in a televised interview with Katie Couric. Furthering her ire, the cheerleading budget is slashed due to the cannon being seen as endangering the lives of children. The money is then handed over to the glee club so they can pay to go to regionals. Karofsky dismisses Finn's suggestion that he join the glee club permanently. Finally, Quinn kisses Finn, telling him that his actions have reminded her of why she loved him.

== Production ==
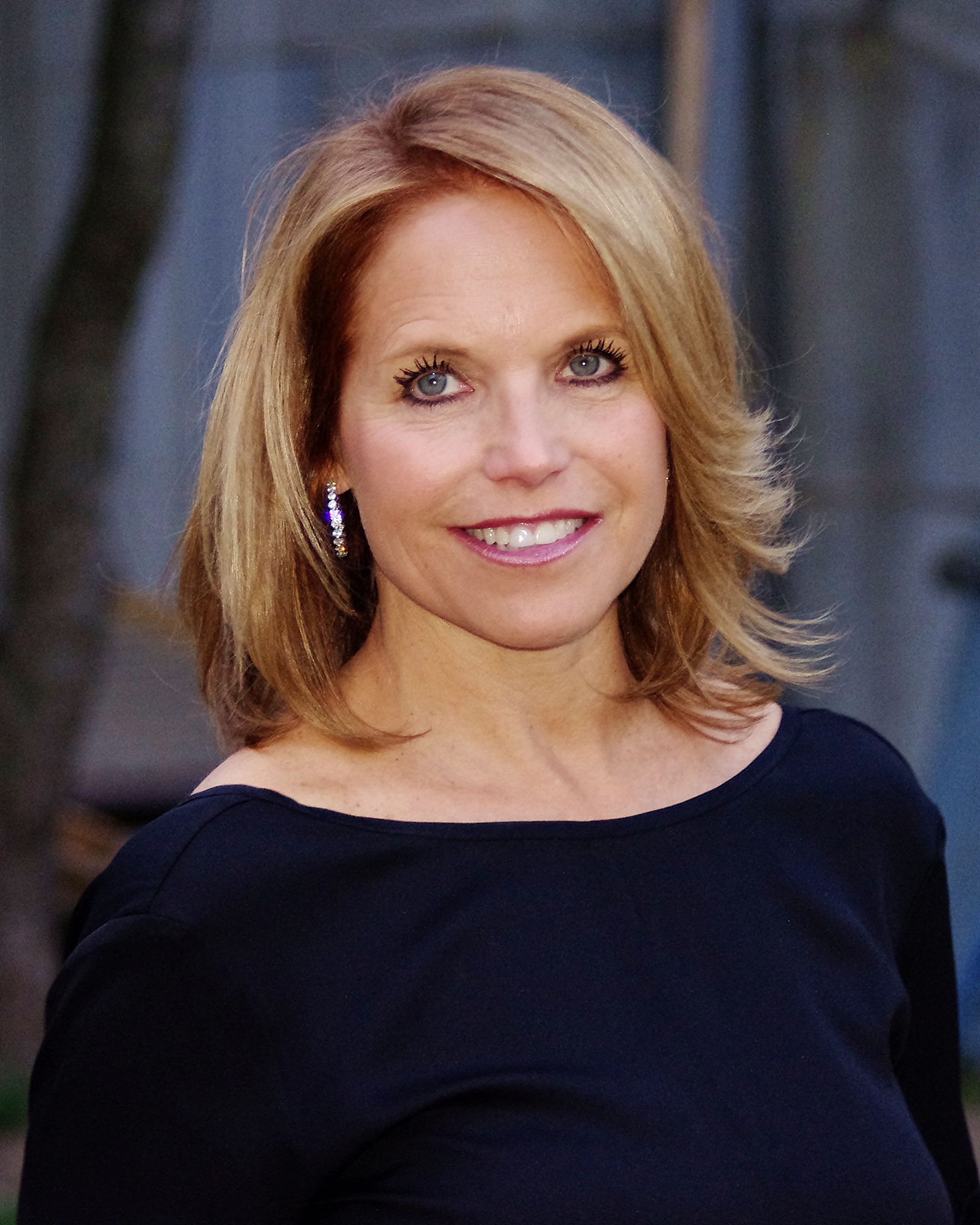
Katie Couric guest starred in the episode

"The Sue Sylvester Shuffle" is reported to be the most expensive post-Super Bowl episode in television history, as well as the most expensive episode of Glee, costing $3–$5 million. Filming was halted on December 10, 2010 as a result of several cast members contracting tonsillitis. An outbreak of the flu soon followed, and filming of the "Thriller" performance was delayed by four weeks. The episode was co-sponsored by General Motors, allowing for limited commercial breaks. The Glee cast featured in a two-minute Chevrolet commercial during the episode. Based on the season one episode "Mattress", they gave an in-character performance of "See the USA in Your Chevrolet".

News anchor Couric made a guest appearance in the episode as herself. She was a fan of the series prior to her casting, having praised its handling of subject matters such as homosexuality, disabilities and teenage pregnancy. Brian Stelter of The New York Times noted that her appearance was unusual, as anchors from rival networks—in Couric's case, CBS—do not typically make cameos on their competitors' programs. Series regular Chris Colfer and recurring guest star Darren Criss were not included in the original draft of the script, but were added by series creator Murphy in a late revision. Other recurring characters who appear are football coach Shannon Beiste, glee club members Mike Chang (Harry Shum, Jr.), Sam Evans (Chord Overstreet) and Lauren Zizes, cheerleader Becky Jackson (Lauren Potter) and school bullies Dave Karofsky and Azimio (James Earl). Two new football-playing characters were introduced: Scott Cooper and Strando, who E! columnist Kristin dos Santos reported might have an increased role in the series as it continued. However, they did not make any additional appearances on the show in its second season. Additionally, producers hired fire breathers, jugglers, and BMX stunt performers for the episode. 500 extras were used, as well as the USC Trojan Marching Band. In January 2011, entertainment website Zap2it reported that Filipino singer Charice would appear as exchange student Sunshine Corazón, performing the Black Eyed Peas' "Meet Me Halfway" with rival glee club Vocal Adrenaline. However, Murphy later stated that Charice would not return to Glee until the end of the year, though he ultimately also made an appearance before then in "A Night of Neglect".

== Reception ==
=== Ratings ===
In the US, "The Sue Sylvester Shuffle" was watched by 26.8 million viewers, and received a rating/share of 11.1/29 Nielsen rating/share in the 18–49 demographic, marking the highest rating for a Glee episode. This also made the episode the highest-rated scripted broadcast of a TV series in three years. The episode continued a trend of declining Super Bowl lead-out show retention. It attained a higher rating than the last scripted lead-out show, The Office episode "Stress Relief", which followed Super Bowl XLIII, but was down 31 percent on the premiere episode of the reality television series Undercover Boss, broadcast after Super Bowl XLIV. Both ratings and viewership significantly increased from the previous Glee episode, "A Very Glee Christmas", which was viewed by 11.07 million US viewers and received a 4.4/13 rating/share in the 18–49 demographic upon its initial airing.

In Canada, where the episode was also broadcast on February 6, 2011, it attained 2.16 million viewers and was the ninth most-watched show of the week. Viewership declined from the previous episode, which was watched by 2.37 million viewers and ranked fifth for the week. The episode's Australian broadcast, on February 14, 2011, drew 1.13 million viewers, making Glee the fourth most-watched program of the night and the most-watched in the 18–49 demographic. It placed tenth in the weekly viewership rankings. Here, viewership registered an increase of approximately 47% over the previous episode, "A Very Glee Christmas", which aired on December 7, 2010, attracted 769,000 viewers, and failed to reach the top fifty for the week. In the UK, the episode was watched by 2.64 million viewers (2.21 million on E4, and 433,000 on E4+1), becoming the most-watched show on cable for the week.

=== Critical response ===
The episode was met with mixed response from critics. Robert Bianco of USA Today found it lacking in plot and a driving moral, however felt that it was acceptable as a standalone episode – one which could be enjoyed by fans and new viewers alike. In contrast, Vicki Hyman of The Star-Ledger commented that despite the football-centric plot, the episode would be hard to follow for new viewers brought in by the Super Bowl, requiring too much knowledge of previous storylines. New York's Willa Paskin felt that Murphy demonstrated "utter contempt" for the potential new audience. She suggested that the McKinley High football team were used as a metaphor for new viewers—who could come to love Glee if they embraced its musical numbers—but found this insulting as the team are portrayed as being ignorant and intolerant. Kevin Fallon of The Atlantic found the episode lacking in Glee's "usual acerbic wit and emotional heft", and criticized the under-use of Colfer and Criss.

Highlighting a general malaise with the show, Lisa de Moraes of The Washington Post deemed Sue's boredom with cheerleading a meta-reference to the series itself. Both she and Emily VanDerWerff of The A.V. Club noted negatively the repetition of familiar storylines, such as the football team vs. glee club rivalry and Sue's attempts to destroy the club. VanDerWerff observed that Glee "keeps tossing the same elements into the hat and coming out with similar results, as though the only thing anybody’s putting any effort into are the musical numbers." She graded the episode a "C", calling it "boring". Time's James Poniewozik also commented on the repetitive premise, suggesting that the jocks versus geeks plot was the one most likely to be accessible to the new audience. He found the episode "easily forgettable" overall, criticizing the flat characterization, but noted that even when the series frustrates him, he continues to love Glee for, not in spite of, its inconsistency.

IGN's Robert Canning also found the long-running football vs. glee storyline repetitive, but wrote that the football players joining glee club was "a welcome twist", however convoluted and unrealistic. He rated the episode 8/10, finding it "preposterously fun". Entertainment Weekly's Ken Tucker considered the episode "at once in-your-face and under-handed, very clever about its very cynicism." He noted that while he had become jaded with Glee, he enjoyed "The Sue Sylvester Shuffle", summarizing that, "Everything in this episode was chaotic and topsy-turvy, but you never had the feeling the silliness was getting away from the producers. It all came together."

"The show has targeted everyone from gays to lesbians, Asians, disabled and each other...several groups are going after the producers including mothers' groups. It's a shame as the dance numbers are amazing, but the writers need to be nice and more creative as opposed to being hurtful. They are sending the wrong message to the youth that are watching."

— Dina Lohan, responding to personal criticism in the episode.

Rick Porter of Zap2it criticized Katie Couric's cameo for an attack made against Dina Lohan. During her interview with Sue, Couric lists Lohan and her dog Sparky as failed Loser of the Year contenders. In a previous episode, Glee also mocked Lohan's daughter, Lindsay. Porter felt that the jibe diminished Couric's journalistic credibility, deeming the Lohans easy targets. However, Canning called Couric's cameo "perhaps the funniest part of the episode", and de Moraes stated that the best line of the episode comes when Sue "looks Katie Couric right in the eye and says, 'I hate you, Diane Sawyer.'"

The Daily News's Soraya Roberts expressed relief that the writers were not gullible enough to have Karofsky end the episode by joining the glee club. Amy Reiter of the Los Angeles Times opined that Karofsky's character development was the best element of the episode, but found his conflicted emotions convoluted, and was pleased that he was victimized by the hockey team.

== Music ==
=== Performances ===
Murphy initially intended the episode to be the second of the season paying tribute to a single band or artist, following the Britney Spears tribute episode "Britney/Brittany", and considered covering songs by Elton John, Prince, the Beatles, Bruce Springsteen or Michael Jackson. Although several artists agreed to a tribute, ultimately it was decided that songs by multiple acts would be covered. Katy Perry's "California Gurls" was used as the opening number, performed as a dance routine by the school cheerleading squad, the Cheerios. Paying homage to Perry's original music video, one element features the cheerleaders appearing to shoot fire from their breasts. Falchuk, the episode's director, stated that the sequence was included to attract male Super Bowl viewers who would not ordinarily watch Glee. Rachel and Puck perform a duet of Lady Antebellum's "Need You Now", intended to showcase the merits of glee club. Finn leads a performance of the Zombies' "She's Not There" as the halftime show warm-up number, and rival a cappella choir the Dalton Academy Warblers perform Destiny's Child's "Bills, Bills, Bills", led by Blaine. A mash-up of Jackson's song "Thriller" with "Heads Will Roll" by the Yeah Yeah Yeahs was used as the final number. In early reports relating to the episode, Lynch claimed that Couric and Morrison would perform a dance number to "Tea for Two", Vincent Youmans and Irving Caesar's song from the 1925 musical No, No, Nanette. This rumor was later dispelled by Murphy.

=== Commentary ===
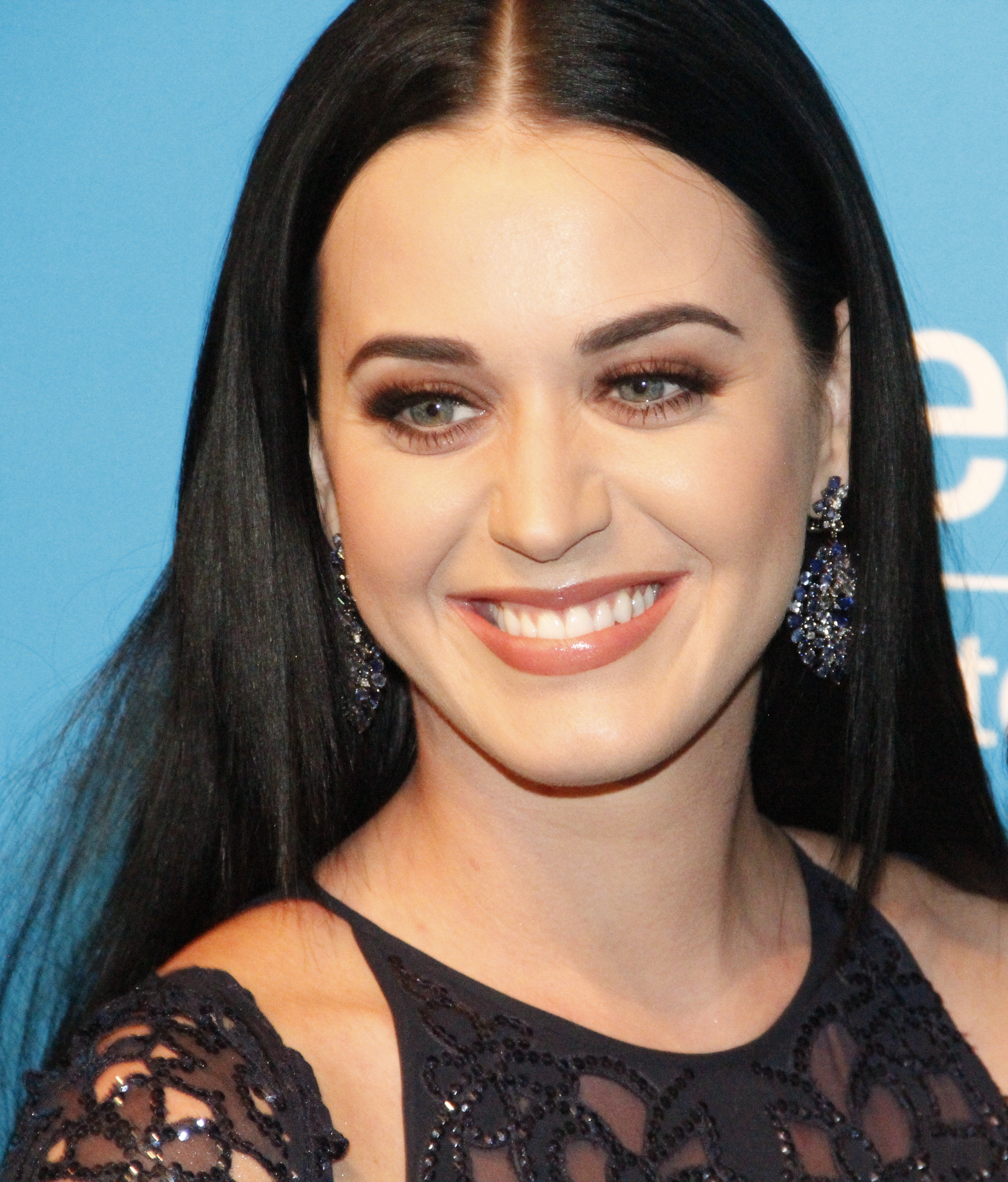
Katy Perry was reportedly excited by the performance of her song "California Gurls" in this episode.

Musical performances also attracted mixed commentary. Though Perry was reportedly excited by the performance of her "California Gurls", it was poorly received by critics. VanDerWerff found it surprisingly "weak and lifeless", and Fallon called it "slow, unfunny, and, quite frankly, boring." Reiter also deemed it boring, describing it as "an elaborate smorgasbord without flavor", and Rolling Stone's Erica Futterman criticized the uninspired, over-the-top choreography.

The performance of "Need You Now" was praised by Raymund Flandez of The Wall Street Journal, though he branded it a "disastrously tactless" song choice. Both he and Jenna Mullins of E! Online questioned the likelihood of a country ballad enthusing the football players toward glee club. Entertainment Weekly's Breia Brissey graded the performance "B+", enjoying the union of Puck and Rachel, but finding it lacking in originality. She gave the same grade to "She's Not There", appreciating the way the song choice complemented the episode's Finn/Quinn storyline. VanDerWerff also received the performance positively, calling it one of the season's better numbers, and Futterman felt that Monteith's vocals were a "perfect fit" for the song, appreciating the initially odd choreography for making the performance more interesting. Reiter was frustrated by the costuming, writing that the zombie makeup made the choreography difficult to follow.

Brissey's lowest grade, a "B−", went to "Bills, Bills, Bills". Though she enjoyed the a cappella cover, Brissey found it incongruous in context, opining that Glee's best performances are those linked to the storylines, allowing viewers to invest in their message. Several critics voiced similar complaints while enjoying the song itself, including Mullins, Futterman and the Houston Chronicle's Bobby Hankinson. Tucker felt that it had "more snap and vigour" than the final number, but also disapproved of its awkward inclusion, writing that it impacted negatively on the episode's momentum. Fallon gave the track an entirely positive review, suggesting that it should have been the episode's opening number and lauding it as "surprising, oozing with charm, and actually kind of joyous." CNN's Lisa Respers France embraced the "completely random and bizarre" song choice, writing that it reminded her of the first season, "when [she] never knew what to expect and [...] was often happily surprised." Reiter too reviewed it favorably, calling it the best performance of the show. She appreciated the focus on facial expressions during the performance, in contrast to the elaborate costuming which she felt distracted from other numbers.

Bianco preferred the intimacy of "Bills, Bills, Bills" to "Thriller / Heads Will Roll", which both he and Hyman criticized for its overproduction and editing. While Bianco found the final number "so over-edited and electronically altered, it could have been done by anyone, anywhere", Hyman and Futterman approved of the performance overall, particularly for the makeup and costuming. Flandez and Brissey compared it favorably to the Super Bowl XLV halftime performances, with Brissey stating that the mashup did Jackson justice and giving it her highest grade of the episode, an "A−". Roberts wrote that the performance "lived up to the pre-show hype", but felt that the rest of the episode "paled in comparison". VanDerWerff commented favorably, "For the few minutes that number was on the screen, Glee was nearly everything it could be, blending fun music with insane production values and characters coming to certain emotional realizations in the moment, heightened as it is by the music."

=== Chart history ===
"Bills, Bills, Bills," "Need You Now," "She's Not There" and "Thriller / Heads Will Roll," were released as singles, available for digital download. The last three tracks are also included on the series' sixth soundtrack album, Glee: The Music, Volume 5, and the first is also included on the seventh soundtrack album, Glee: The Music Presents the Warblers. Each song charted on the Billboard Hot 100, and all but "She's Not There" placed on the Canadian Hot 100 and Australian ARIA Charts. In the US, three of the four tracks debuted on the February 10, 2011 issue: "Bills, Bills, Bills" entered at number 79, "Need You Now" at number 72, and "Thriller / Heads Will Roll" at number 75. The February 17, 2011 chart saw "She's Not There" debut at number 87, while "Bills, Bills, Bills" climbed to 44, "Need You Now" to 62 and "Thriller / Heads Will Roll" to 38.

In Canada, the three charting singles debuted on the February 11, 2011 chart. "Need You Now" entered at its peak position of number 51. "Bills, Bills, Bills" entered at number 86 and peaked the following week at 58. "Thriller / Heads Will Roll" entered at 76 and peaked at 30. The singles' Australian release saw them enter the charts on February 21, 2011: "Bills, Bills, Bills" at number 71, "Need You Now" at 46 and "Thriller / Heads Will Roll" at 17. Having previously dropped out of the chart, the original Lady Antebellum version of "Need You Now" re-entered at number 31 in the same week as the Glee cover. "Thriller / Heads Will Roll" also managed to chart in Ireland at number 37 and in New Zealand at number 38.

== See also ==
- Michael Jackson's Thriller
- Thrill the World
- Thriller (viral video)
