= On My Way (Glee) =

- Glee episode
- Episode no.: Season 3 Episode 14
- Directed by: Bradley Buecker
- Written by: Roberto Aguirre-Sacasa
- Production code: 3ARC14
- Original air date: February 21, 2012

Guest appearances
- Jeff Goldblum as Hiram Berry; Brian Stokes Mitchell as LeRoy Berry; Mike O'Malley as Burt Hummel; Iqbal Theba as Principal Figgins; Dot-Marie Jones as Coach Beiste; Chord Overstreet as Sam Evans; Romy Rosemont as Carole Hudson-Hummel; Max Adler as Dave Karofsky; Grant Gustin as Sebastian Smythe; Vanessa Lengies as Sugar Motta; Damian McGinty as Rory Flanagan; Samuel Larsen as Joe Hart; Daniel Roebuck as Paul Karofsky; Aaron Hill as Nick

Episode chronology
| ← Previous "Heart" | Next → "Big Brother" |
- Glee season 3

"On My Way" is the fourteenth episode and winter finale of the third season of the American musical television series Glee, and the fifty-eighth overall. Written by Roberto Aguirre-Sacasa and directed by Bradley Buecker, the episode aired on Fox in the United States on February 21, 2012. It features New Directions competing against the Dalton Academy Warblers at the Regionals show choir competition, Rachel (Lea Michele) and Finn (Cory Monteith) moving up their wedding, the return of special guest stars Jeff Goldblum and Brian Stokes Mitchell as Rachel's fathers, and the attempted suicide of Dave Karofsky (Max Adler).

The episode received a strong and varied reaction from reviewers. Most heaped praise on the scenes featuring Karofsky, both the events leading up to his suicide attempt and when Kurt (Chris Colfer) visited him in the hospital. However, many felt the strength of this storyline unbalanced the episode, and the rest of the episode, particularly the Regionals competition and the Rachel and Finn wedding storyline, did not measure up. The final scene, which ended with Quinn (Dianna Agron) being in a potentially fatal car crash, was controversial.

The only song that was given a strongly enthusiastic reception was "Cough Syrup", which was sung by Blaine (Darren Criss) and used to soundtrack the Karofsky suicide sequence. The other songs, all performances for the Regionals competition, received a mixture of reviews. Five of the six singles released from this episode charted on both the Billboard Hot 100 and the Billboard Canadian Hot 100; the mash-up of "Fly" and "I Believe I Can Fly" performed by New Directions charted the highest in the US, while "What Doesn't Kill You (Stronger)" performed by the Troubletones as part of the New Directions set charted the best of the five in Canada.

Upon its initial airing, this episode was viewed by 7.46 million American viewers and received a 3.0/8 Nielsen rating/share in the 18–49 demographic. The total viewership was up from "Heart", which aired the previous week.

== Plot ==
With the Regionals Competition imminent, Dalton Academy Warblers captain Sebastian Smythe (Grant Gustin) threatens to post a sexually explicit photoshopped picture of Finn Hudson (Cory Monteith) on the Internet unless New Directions co-captain Rachel Berry (Lea Michele) withdraws from the competition. Finn gets angry and attempts to assault Sebastian which angers Mr Schue. Rachel, who believes that her performance is crucial to her admission to NYADA, refuses to do so, which angers Finn.

Dave Karofsky (Max Adler) is outed at his school and subsequently bullied by his teammates in the locker room. He is also mercilessly attacked online. Karofsky, devastated, attempts suicide by hanging, but is saved in time by his father. The news causes shock at his old school, McKinley High: Members of the staff believe they could have done more to help him when he had been a student there, while Kurt blames himself for ignoring Karofsky's repeated phone calls that week. It also shocks Sebastian, who had cruelly rebuffed Karofsky at a gay bar, and he destroys the photos of Finn, thus abandoning his attempt at blackmail. New Directions coach Will Schuester (Matthew Morrison) has all of the members reveal something they are looking forward to in the future, to remind them that no matter how low they think their lives have sunk, they should not forget what is ahead of them. Rachel and Finn apologize to each other, and decide to get married the day after Regionals.

Regionals opens with the Warblers performing two songs, "Stand" and "Glad You Came", and the second group, the Golden Goblets, are strong performers as well. In the choir room, before New Directions goes on, Finn announces that he and Rachel are getting married afterward, and tells the group to live each day as if it is their last. New Directions opens their set with a mash-up of "Fly" and "I Believe I Can Fly", which is followed by a Troubletones performance of "What Doesn't Kill You (Stronger)". Rachel ends the set by performing "Here's to Us", and New Directions wins the competition, with the Warblers finishing second.

Quinn Fabray (Dianna Agron) asks cheerleading coach Sue Sylvester (Jane Lynch) to allow her to rejoin the Cheerios, but Sue refuses, although she confides in Quinn that she is pregnant. However, following Regionals, she changes her mind, and gives Quinn a cheerleading uniform. Quinn also changes her mind about Finn and Rachel's marriage and tells Rachel that she now supports it, and hopes it isn't too late to be a bridesmaid.

Hiram Berry (Jeff Goldblum) and Burt Hummel (Mike O'Malley) attempt to devise a last-minute scheme to derail the wedding. Rachel is reluctant to start without Quinn, who has driven home to pick up her bridesmaid's dress, and texts Quinn to find out where she is. Quinn is responding to Rachel's text when a truck crashes into the driver's side of her car.

== Production ==
"On My Way" is the second episode to be written by co-producer Roberto Aguirre-Sacasa, whose first episode was this season's "The First Time"; the episode was directed by co-executive producer Bradley Buecker. The cast began work on the episode on January 30, 2012; the final two numbers for the previous episode, "Heart", were filmed on the following day, January 31, 2012. The Regionals competition scenes concluded the filming for the episode, and were shot on the two days ending February 8, 2012.

Special guest stars Jeff Goldblum and Brian Stokes Mitchell return as Rachel's fathers Hiram and LeRoy Berry. Other recurring guest stars include glee club members Sam Evans (Chord Overstreet), Rory Flanagan (Damian McGinty) and Sugar Motta (Vanessa Lengies), Dalton Academy Warbler Sebastian Smythe (Grant Gustin), Kurt and Finn's parents Burt Hummel (Mike O'Malley) and Carole Hudson-Hummel (Romy Rosemont), former McKinley student Dave Karofsky (Max Adler) and his father Paul (Daniel Roebuck), Principal Figgins (Iqbal Theba), football coach Shannon Beiste (Dot-Marie Jones), and new McKinley transfer student Joe Hart (Samuel Larsen). Glee co-creator Ian Brennan appeared in the episode as a Regionals competition judge named Svengoobles, a parody of the character Svengoolie. NeNe Leakes, who plays coach Roz Washington, was announced by a Fox press release as guest starring in the episode, and Leakes and Chris Colfer both tweeted a picture of the two of them together from the set during the filming of the Regionals competition, but the scenes shot with Leakes did not appear in the episode as broadcast, nor was she credited. A scene between Rachel and Quinn, which was shown during a promo for the episode, also did not appear, having been cut "for time", but it was released as a YouTube video on August 2, 2012, by executive producer Ryan Murphy.

The episode features performances of cover versions of eight songs, and seven of them are being released as six singles, available for downloading, with the two-song mash-up released as one single. The songs on the singles include "Cough Syrup" by Young the Giant, performed by Darren Criss; "Glad You Came" by The Wanted and "Stand" by Lenny Kravitz, performed by the Dalton Academy Warblers; Kelly Clarkson's "What Doesn't Kill You (Stronger)" performed by the Troubletones, a mash-up of "Fly" by Nicki Minaj featuring Rihanna with R. Kelly's "I Believe I Can Fly" performed by New Directions; and "Here's to Us" by Halestorm, performed by Michele and New Directions. The eighth song is performed by a glee club from the school Our Lady of Perpetual Sorrow: Eric Barnum's setting of Lord Byron's poem "She Walks in Beauty". The vocal rendition comes from a 2008 recording by University of Redlands' Madrigal Singers. The soundtrack uses the original "Chapel of Love" by The Dixie Cups during the episode's final sequence; the song was briefly covered by Hiram and LeRoy Berry in the previous episode, "Heart".

The teen suicide storyline, and the public service announcement broadcast during the episode for The Trevor Project, an organization that works to prevent LGBT suicide, resulted in a record number of calls to the project's hotline and record traffic for its website. According to Trevor Project cofounder Peggy Rajski, because the show "worked in conjunction" with them, they were prepared in advance to handle the greater hotline traffic, which was "triple the [usual] number of calls"; they also saw a nearly sevenfold increase to 10,000 website visitors on the evening the program aired.

The "idea for a character to get into a texting-while-driving accident" has been under consideration since April 2010, and was inspired by the appearance of the show's cast early that month on The Oprah Winfrey Show. At the time, the cast members signed contracts at Winfrey's behest, pledging not to text while they were driving.

== Reception ==
=== Ratings ===
"On My Way" was first broadcast on February 21, 2012, in the United States on Fox. It received a 3.0/8 Nielsen rating/share in the 18–49 demographic, and attracted 7.46 million American viewers during its initial airing, an increase over the 2.8/8 rating/share and 6.99 million viewers of the previous episode, which was broadcast on February 14, 2012. Viewership increased slightly in Canada, where 1.74 million viewers watched the episode on the same day as its American premiere. It was the fifteenth most-viewed show of the week, down two slots but up about 1% from the 1.72 million viewers who watched "Heart" the previous week.

In the United Kingdom, "On My Way" first aired on March 29, 2012, and was watched on Sky 1 by 763,000 viewers. Viewership was down over 3% from "Heart", which attracted 792,000 viewers when it aired the week before. In Australia, "On My Way" was broadcast on March 23, 2012. It was watched by 558,000 viewers, which made Glee the fifteenth most-watched program of the night, down from fourteenth two weeks before, when the previous episode, "Heart", aired. Actual viewership declined less than 1% from the 563,000 viewers on March 9, 2012.

=== Critical reception ===
There was a strong and varied reaction to the episode by reviewers. Erica Futterman of Rolling Stone described it as "an emotional rollercoaster that at times may have been jarring or heavy-handed, but overall did what a winter finale should: gave us plenty of surprises, while setting things up for the future". IGN's Robert Canning was "won over by a powerfully acted and directed story" and gave the episode a "great" rating of 8.0 out of 10; he noted that "as is often the case, the smaller stories involving Karofsky and Quinn were more successful than larger arcs like Rachel and Finn's". Bobby Hankinson of the Houston Chronicle said that rather than "a million different storylines" there were a few "really good ones" and added, "It was chaos, but controlled chaos." The A.V. Club's Emily VanDerWerff wrote, "The sequence in which Karofsky prepared himself for death was, unquestionably, one of the best things Glee has ever done." She added that it was "all the more a shame" that it occurred in an episode that did not know how to make effective use of "the impact of that moment", and she gave the episode as a whole a "D" grade. In a similar vein, James Poniewozik of Time said, "the beginning of the episode was a very effective 15 minutes or so of television", but said that was also the episode's problem. Michael Slezak of TVLine noted that the show's "audacity" allowed it "to tackle some of the most important issues of the day with a headiness and honesty that aren’t merely refreshing, but absolutely necessary", and added, "If I’ve got any complaint with the episode, it would have to be that for a show that’s billed as a musical comedy, there certainly weren’t many laughs, and the musical interludes seemed like something of an afterthought". In a similar vein, Billboard's Rae Votta wrote, "Any thoughts that Glee is, in fact, a comedy should be soundly crushed by now. It's a fantastical reality, and sometimes you laugh at that, but other times you cry."

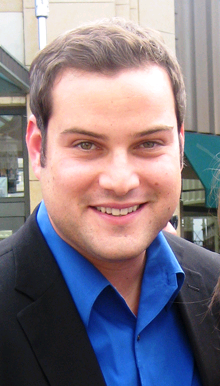
Max Adler (pictured) was praised for his portrayal of Dave Karofsky in this episode

The sequence where Karofsky attempts suicide was greatly praised on many levels; Slezak called it "as devastating as anything I’ve seen on TV this year". Canning wrote that "the initial locker room scene was heartbreaking" and "Max Adler's subtle facial expressions were brilliant". Crystal Bell of HuffPost TV applauded Adler "for doing such an amazing job" on the suicide scene. She stated, "I would have preferred if Karofsky's storyline would have been the focus of the entire episode." BuddyTV's John Kubicek was critical of the entire storyline, and wrote that teen suicide was "one of those incredibly sensitive issues" that "shouldn't be taken on so directly by a light, silly musical comedy like Glee". VanDerWerff commented that "as the show got the little details of Karofsky's desperate act just right, the whole thing took on a weight", and singled out the scene "where the teachers talked about what had happened and the smash cut to Karofsky's father screaming at him to get up" as "heart-wrenching"; she added, "This was the Glee I had first loved, the Glee that could blend music and romance and comedy and highly volatile drama into one cocktail", though she also said that the episode had failed to "pay off those emotions". Bell declared that "best scene in the entire episode is when Kurt visits Karofsky in the hospital". Joseph Brannigan Lynch of Entertainment Weekly called it "one of the most touching scenes of this season" and "guileless, well-acted and eye-watering". Votta wrote, "As always, Kurt and Karofsky's scenes shine as the strongest in whichever episode they're featured."

MTV's Kevin P. Sullivan wrote that the episode "jammed in Regionals, something that used to matter", and did so without any "meaningful buildup to the competition". Poniewozik described the competition showdown as "unconnected with the episode we began watching", and Canning said that "Regionals just got in the way" and the performances "did a disservice to what was going on with Karofsky". Votta characterized the McKinley victory as "so secondary to the point of this episode that it feels completely anticlimactic", and VanDerWerff summarized, "When New Directions hoists that trophy aloft at the end, it’s about the least compelling victory for the group yet."

VanDerWerff said that Morrison had "a nice moment when he underplays the scene where he talks about how Will once contemplated suicide after getting caught cheating on a test", though while Lynch thought the "idea of the scene was nice", it was "more awkward than meaningful". Slezak called it "the worst moment of the episode", and criticized the "utter lack of context" regarding what else Will might have been going through. Kubicek described it as an "embarrassingly uncomfortable speech", and Will's implicit comparison of cheating on a test to the stresses of teenage homosexuality was "just wrong". VanDerWerff thought that the next part of the sequence had "a smallness, a realness to the scene that's kind of beautiful, really", and that it feels "like they're actual high school kids"; Votta commented that "as the kids admit all the things they are looking forward to", it reminds viewers why they are "rooting for this ragtag bunch".

The wedding of Rachel and Finn did not excite interest among reviewers. Votta said the plot "continues to feel exhausting" and was "small in comparison to the other threads going on", and Raymund Flandez of The Wall Street Journal called it the "most preposterous of all" the storylines. VanDerWerff wrote, "I can buy that Finn and Rachel would be that stupid as to think getting married would perk everybody right on up", as could Votta, who likened it to "people needing to find [something] positive to focus" on, "even if that supposedly positive thing is its own train wreck". The Washington Post's Jen Chaney wondered why the showed "squander[ed] the presence of Jeff Goldblum and Brian Stokes Mitchell for the second week in a row".

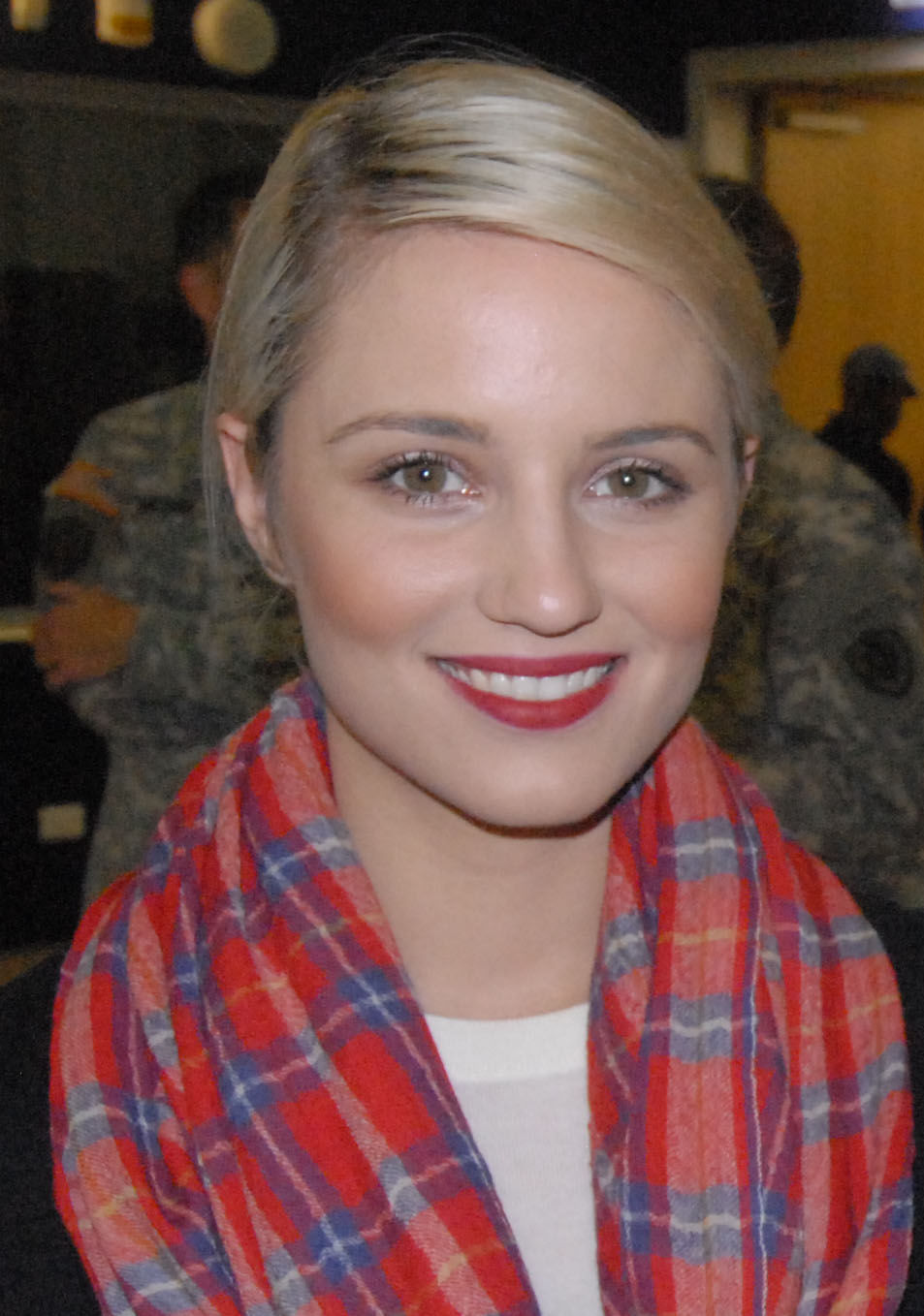
Reviewers were divided on the cliffhanger ending which showed Quinn (Agron, pictured) moments before she was in a serious automobile accident

Bell lauded the "brilliant conversation between Quinn and Sue toward the end where Sue told Quinn that she admired her". Lynch though that Kurt was "out of line" when he "declared Quinn didn't know what it was like to truly suffer". He noted that she was "kicked out of her house and disowned by her father while pregnant" and added, "she's suffered plenty for a teenager". He said about the episode's final scene, which ended as the car Quinn was driving was about to be hit by a rapidly moving truck, "you can't help but feel sucker-punched when something like this happens". Flandez called it a "cowardly ending", but Canning praised the "good cliffhanger", and the "subtle enough" storytelling that did not "telegraph anything" before the closing sequence.

A number of reviewers praised Sebastian's villainous ways despite his decision to abandon his blackmail attempt. Futterman noted that people had just gotten "used to the idea of a well-played villain on the show", while Amy Reiter of The Los Angeles Times expressed doubt about a complete conversion: "We'll see how long that lasts." Slezak called him a "gem when it comes to delivering spicy one-liners", though he was less enthusiastic about the character's vocal solos, as was Canning, who nevertheless hailed Sebastian as a "fine nemesis".

Absent more screen time for the Karofsky storyline, Bell said that the episode "felt more like a PSA" as it "plugged everything from The Trevor Project to Lady Gaga's Born This Way Foundation". Flandez stated that "this incredibly monumentous message of hope became sullied with unexpected product placements: Edible Arrangements, Peanut Butter & Co., even Sex and the City 3." Sullivan was unsure whether the God Squad's plan to bring "an Edible Arrangement to Karofsky" was a "poorly timed joke or product placement", but deemed it "regrettable either way".

=== Music and performances ===
The musical performances were given a mixed response by reviewers. Canning wrote that "the performances of the episode didn't measure up" to the non-musical material, and "were bland and flat", while Chaney characterized them as "often lackluster" and added that they were part of "the most boring regionals competition ever". Hankinson, however, called it a "night of very solid performances". Chaney said that Criss "did a fine job" with the first number, "Cough Syrup", which was sung during the Karofsky suicide sequence, and gave it a "B". Futterman said Blaine "flawlessly deliver[ed] the vocal". Lynch called it a "chilling rendition" that was "hard to shake" and gave it an "A−", the same grade given by Slezak, who wrote, "taken on its own, Blaine's vocal was strong and passionate—perhaps better than the original". Hankinson said it was the "best" of the episode, and added that the "scene was really, really well done and carried maximum emotional punch".

The Regionals songs by the Warblers were given a lukewarm reception. "Stand" was characterized by Lynch as "bouncy fun, but in a bland, forgettable sense", and "Glad You Came" as "rather unmemorable"; both songs received a "B−" grade. Slezak gave the two songs a "C+", and called Sebastian's lead vocals "as bland as a bowl of plain lasagna noodles", and Canning described his as "a weak voice that doesn't deliver a very convincing performance". Votta described "Stand" as "lackluster and mild", but called "Glad You Came" the "strongest Warbler number since Blaine's defection". She added, "It's catchy and well-choreographed, and if Sebastian's addition to the Warblers spurred them to finally take their in-Dalton dance-heavy and exuberant performance style to competition, then it's a welcome one." Hankinson noted that the Warblers "performed two wonderful songs" that were new to him. Flandez and Chaney, among others, wished it were Blaine leading the Warblers, not Sebastian.

Chaney wrote that the mash-up of "Fly" and "I Believe I Can Fly" was "an unexpectedly lovely mix" and gave it a "B+". Futterman said it "seamlessly" wove the two "into an uplifting and thematically appropriate mash-up", and credited Santana and Blaine with "an impressive job on Minaj's rap verses, while Rachel, Artie and Mercedes split tastefully understated solos". Slezak credited "solid vocals from Artie, Finn, Rachel, and Mercedes, and some not terrible rapping from Blaine and Santana", but he thought the number "lacked the epic scope you want from a Regionals showdown" and disliked the song "I Believe I Can Fly"; his grade was a "B−". Votta characterized the mashup as "just off" and "better visually than it is just to listen to the track". Lynch said Santana had "attitude to spare" in her rap and New Directions "harmonized wonderfully on this very re-listenable mash-up", and gave it a "B+" grade.

Slezak said that the vocals on "What Doesn't Kill You (Stronger)" were "fantastic" and graded the song an "A−". Flandez called the Troubletones "fine, fierce and fabulous", though Chaney wrote that the rendition was "a fairly routine take". Chaney and Slezak both wondered about the extra girls in the number, but Lynch simply said, "Nice to get a little Troubletones action separate from (but still part of) the New Directions". Lynch's grade was a "B", in part because Mercedes's voice "seemed strangely buried".

Reviewers of "Here's to Us" differed on what they felt worked and didn't. Lynch said the song "seemed the wrong fit" for Rachel—"not horrible, but a misfire"—and gave it a "B−". Chaney was more critical of the song itself when she gave her "C+" grade and described it as "so bland" that it "had little emotional impact" despite Michele's "determined ferocity". Votta called the number "pretty" but said the placement of the boys in the balconies was "cute but not really compelling as a staged performance". Slezak stated that it was "hard to find any fault with Lea Michele's vocal performances" and gave it a "B+", and Futterman wrote, "It's buoyant and celebratory, and Rachel kills it."

=== Chart history ===
Of the six singles released for the episode, five debuted on US and Canadian top 100 charts. The mash-up of "Fly" and "I Believe I Can Fly" was the highest debut in the US at number 56 on the Billboard Hot 100, followed by "Cough Syrup" at number 65, "What Doesn't Kill You (Stronger)" at number 66, "Here's to Us" at number 73 and "Glad You Came" at number 90. The chart order was different on the Billboard Canadian Hot 100, where "(What Doesn't Kill You) Stronger" had the highest debut at number 51, "Fly / I Believe I Can Fly" debuted at number 59, "Here's to Us" at number 64, "Cough Syrup" at number 67 and "Glad You Came" at number 74.

The singles also had an effect on the charting of the original versions of three of the songs. Kelly Clarkson's "Stronger (What Doesn't Kill You)" moved back into first place from fourth on the Billboard Hot 100, and from fourth to third, equalling its previous best showing, on the Canadian Hot 100. It was beaten there by The Wanted's "Glad You Came", which was that chart's "greatest gainer", and moved from number 26 to number two, its highest position on the Canadian chart to date. "Glad You Came" also made a big jump in the US, and went from number 18 to number five. "Cough Syrup" by Young the Giant debuted on both charts, at number 95 in the US and number 82 in Canada, and was the first time the group had been on the Billboard Hot 100, though the song had previously "bubbled under" the chart at number 117.
