= Heart (Glee) =

- Glee episode
- Episode no.: Season 3 Episode 13
- Directed by: Brad Falchuk
- Written by: Ali Adler
- Production code: 3ARC13
- Original air date: February 14, 2012

Guest appearances
- Jeff Goldblum as Hiram Berry; Brian Stokes Mitchell as LeRoy Berry; Mike O'Malley as Burt Hummel; Iqbal Theba as Principal Figgins; Chord Overstreet as Sam Evans; Romy Rosemont as Carole Hudson-Hummel; Max Adler as Dave Karofsky; Vanessa Lengies as Sugar Motta; Damian McGinty as Rory Flanagan; Samuel Larsen as Joe Hart; LaMarcus Tinker as Shane Tinsley; Aaron Hill as Nick

Episode chronology
← Previous "The Spanish Teacher"	Next → "On My Way"
- Glee season 3

"Heart" (stylized as "♥" in Fox's video preview materials) is the thirteenth episode of the third season of the American musical television series Glee, and the fifty-seventh overall. Written by Ali Adler and directed by co-creator Brad Falchuk, the episode aired on Fox in the United States on February 14, 2012, and features Valentine's Day love songs performed by the McKinley High glee club. It also features the debuts of special guest stars Jeff Goldblum and Brian Stokes Mitchell as Rachel's two fathers and The Glee Project winner Samuel Larsen as transfer student Joe Hart.

Whitney Houston's version of Dolly Parton's "I Will Always Love You" is performed by Mercedes (Amber Riley) in the episode, and the completed episode had been delivered to the network and was scheduled to run in three days when Houston died unexpectedly on February 11, 2012; a dedication to her was added in the episode's end credits. Reviewers gave Riley's rendition a very positive reception, the best of those given to the ten songs that were heard in the episode, though the performances in general were well received. It was one of two songs from the episode to chart on the Billboard Hot 100 and the Canadian Hot 100, along with "Stereo Hearts", while the other six singles did not chart.

Reviews of the episode varied widely, but there was more positive reaction than not. The greatest enthusiasm was for Rachel's fathers, though Principal Figgins (Iqbal Theba) was complimented on his brief scenes, and the scene with Kurt (Chris Colfer) and Karofsky (Max Adler) was also praised. The episode was also significant because it featured an on-screen kiss by Santana (Naya Rivera) and Brittany (Heather Morris), which was the show's first lesbian kiss.

Upon its initial airing, this episode was viewed by 6.99 million American viewers and received a 2.8/8 Nielsen rating/share in the 18–49 demographic, the lowest rating of the third season to date. The total viewership was down over 11% from the previous episode, "The Spanish Teacher".

== Plot ==
Will (Matthew Morrison) assigns the members of New Directions to perform the best love songs for Valentine's Day. Sugar (Vanessa Lengies) takes the opportunity to announce a Valentine's Day party, for which everyone must have a date, including herself. Artie (Kevin McHale) and Rory (Damian McGinty) both set out to woo Sugar with gifts, and she vacillates between them, so they move to song: Artie sings "Let Me Love You" and Rory, after he says he has been informed that his visa for a second year at McKinley has been denied, performs "Home". Sugar chooses Rory as her date.

Santana (Naya Rivera) and Brittany (Heather Morris) are about to kiss in the hall when Principal Figgins (Iqbal Theba) stops them. He tells them that he has received complaints about their public displays of affection, which Santana decries as a double standard, citing the much longer public kisses of Finn (Cory Monteith) and Rachel (Lea Michele).

Quinn (Dianna Agron), Mercedes (Amber Riley) and Sam (Chord Overstreet) are members of a Christian club called the God Squad and decide to raise money by performing singing telegrams for Valentine's Day; their newest member is the previously home-schooled Joe Hart (Samuel Larsen), who is now a junior at McKinley. The group serenades Rachel with "Stereo Hearts" at Finn's behest. Santana then hires them to sing for Brittany, which sparks a discussion among squad members on the morality of homosexuality; Joe must decide whether he is comfortable delivering a singing telegram for a gay couple.

Mercedes breaks up with Shane (LaMarcus Tinker), but she will not date Sam because she feels guilty for hurting Shane and wants to be sure of her own feelings. She performs "I Will Always Love You" as her song, and Sam leaves in tears.

Finn and Rachel reveal their marriage plans to New Directions, most of whom are less than enthused. Rachel's two fathers Hiram and LeRoy Berry (Jeff Goldblum and Brian Stokes Mitchell), along with Finn's mother Carole (Romy Rosemont) and his step-father Burt Hummel (Mike O'Malley), act very supportive and arrange for the couple to spend the night together in Rachel's room, expecting that the reality of having to live together will encourage the teens to postpone their wedding. The ruse backfires, and the engaged pair announce that they will be getting married even sooner than planned.

Kurt has been receiving valentines and gifts all week from a secret admirer that he believes to be Blaine (Darren Criss), who is still home recovering from eye surgery. He arrives at Sugar's party early to discover his admirer is actually former bully Karofsky (Max Adler), who declares his love for Kurt. Kurt lets him down gently, but their parting words are overheard by a classmate of Karofsky's, and Karofsky flees.

Once the party is underway, the God Squad delivers their singing telegram, a "Cherish / Cherish" mash-up, to Brittany on Santana's behalf, and the couple kisses. Sugar and Rory dance, but he is confused by her saying that she will miss him when he has to leave. Blaine arrives, having finally recovered, to lead the group in singing "Love Shack".

== Production ==
"Heart" is the second episode to be written by co-executive producer Ali Adler, and it was directed by co-creator Brad Falchuk. It commenced filming on January 13, 2012, the same day that the eleventh episode, the Michael Jackson tribute episode, completed its final musical number, and while the twelfth episode was being filmed, which had begun on January 5, 2012. The episode completed its filming with two musical numbers on January 31, 2012.

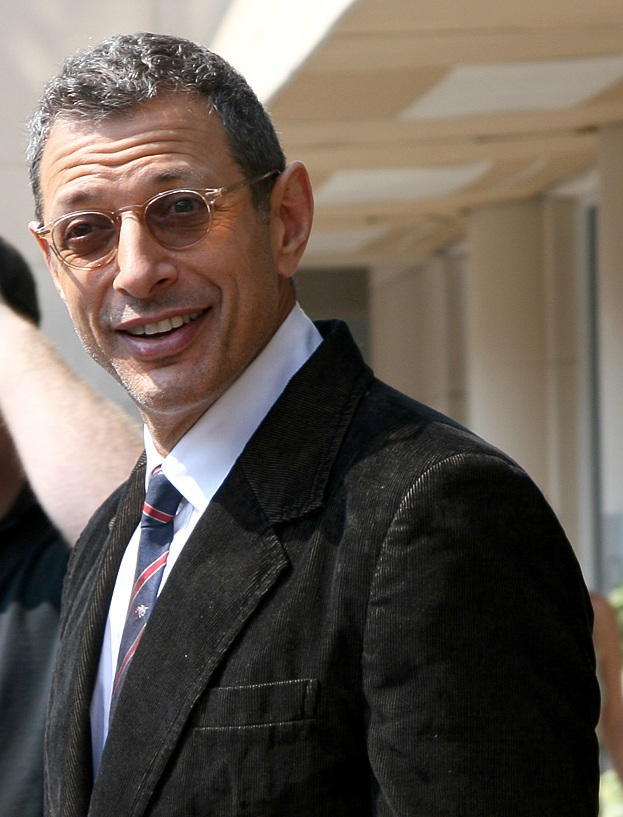
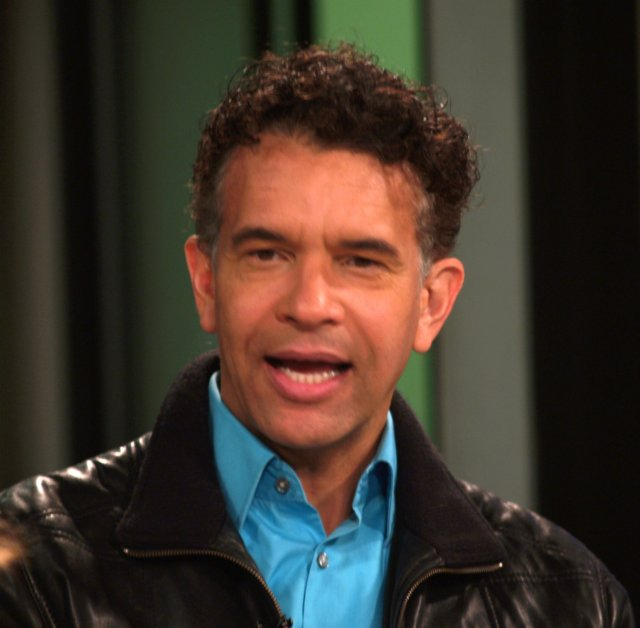
Jeff Goldblum (left) and Brian Stokes Mitchell (right) appear for the first time on Glee as Rachel's fathers, Hiram and LeRoy Berry.

On December 8, 2011, it was reported that the show had begun casting Rachel's two fathers. It was not until January 17, 2012, that the actors playing Hiram and LeRoy Berry were identified as Jeff Goldblum and Brian Stokes Mitchell, respectively. Two days later they were on the set, shooting their first scenes with Lea Michele, who tweeted a picture of the three of them.

The appearance was long in coming, and Goldblum and Stokes Mitchell were not the first actors cast in those roles, though they are the first to appear on screen. A scene had been written in 2009 for the second episode, "Showmance", that featured Rachel's fathers, but it was subsequently cut from the script even though the actors had already been cast and reported for work. Shortly before the final nine episodes of the first season were to begin airing, co-creator Ryan Murphy, when asked at PaleyFest in March 2010 whether her fathers would be appearing, replied: "Not this season. We've never met them; I think that's a great surprise. I think you want to hold that a little bit." Between the second and third seasons, co-creator Ian Brennan said, "It's tricky with parents", referenced the scene cut from "Showmance", and noted, "we've talked about it forever, about different sets of parents", but "when you're in high school, your parents stop being the major influence in your life". He then added, "I think soon we'll probably reveal more and more".

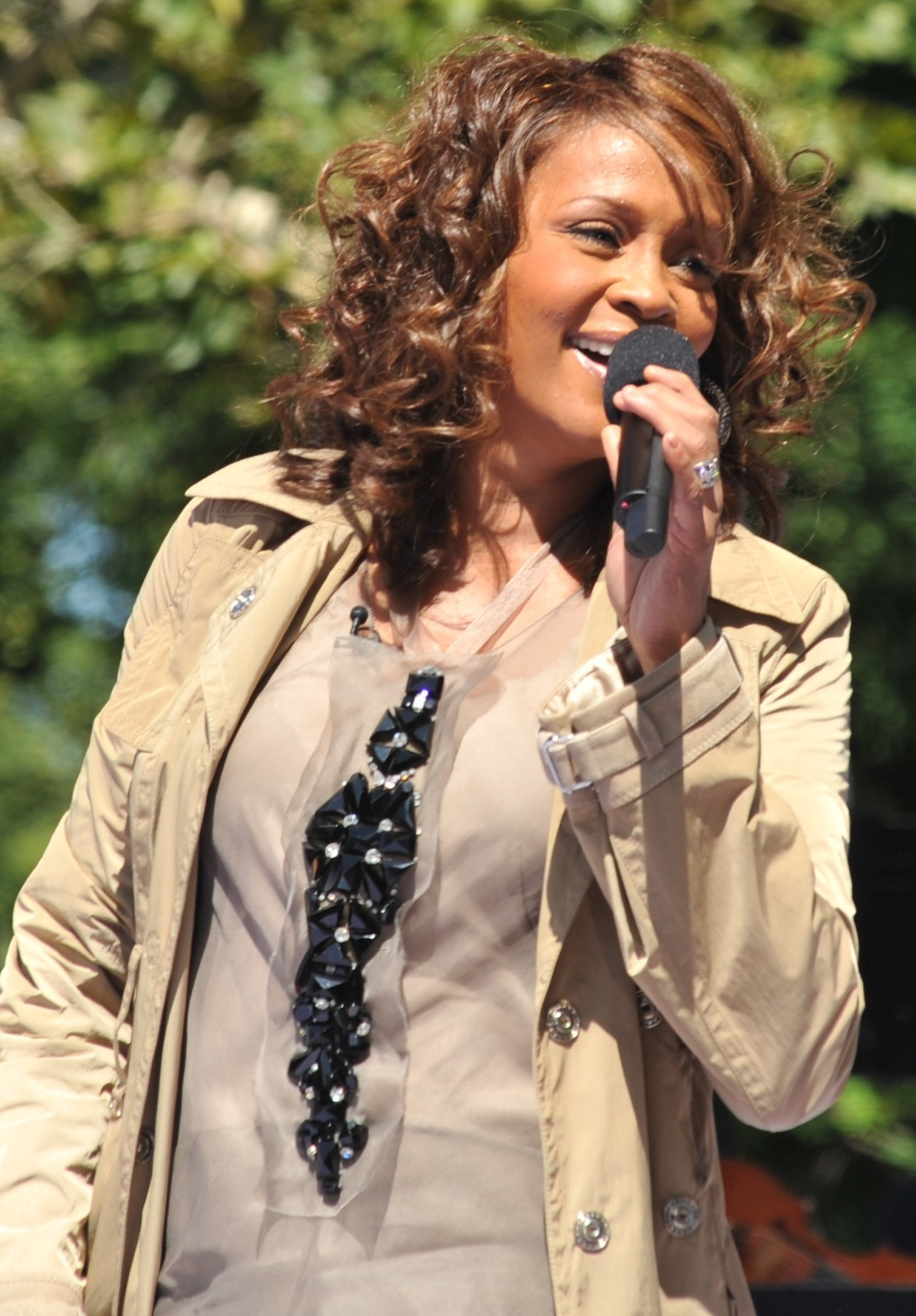
"Heart" is dedicated to Whitney Houston, who died three days before the episode aired.

The second of the two winners of The Glee Project's seven-episode arc, Samuel Larsen, debuts in this episode as a new transfer student to McKinley named Joe Hart. Larsen had arrived on the set by January 17, 2012, according to Cory Monteith, who described Larsen's role as one that "ties into a lot of preexisting storylines", and "a smart way to bring him into the show". Larsen's first day of filming with the glee club was January 25, 2012, and a number of his fellow actors tweeted of his arrival, including Lea Michele, Dianna Agron, and fellow Glee Project winner Damian McGinty.

Although it was originally thought that Darren Criss would be missing "one and a half episodes", and therefore might return in time to appear in this episode after missing the twelfth one, co-star Chris Colfer initially stated that Criss would not be appearing: "You'll find out how [Blaine] leaves for a little bit and then comes back, but it’s nothing too bad or serious". He later said that Blaine "is in the episode, it's not in the way you might think"; Criss did return in time to appear in the musical finale. Recurring guest stars who are appearing in the episode include glee club members Sam Evans (Overstreet), Rory Flanagan (McGinty) and Sugar Motta (Lengies), Principal Figgins (Theba), Finn's mother Carole Hudson-Hummel (Rosemont) and stepfather Burt Hummel (O'Malley), former McKinley student Dave Karofsky (Adler) and McKinley football player Shane Tinsley (Tinker).

The episode features cover versions of ten songs, nine of which have been released as eight singles available for downloading, with the two-song mash-up released as one single, but no release of "Chapel of Love", which was heard in only a brief snippet on the show. Performances include Nat King Cole's "L-O-V-E" sung by Jenna Ushkowitz and Harry Shum, Jr.; Dolly Parton's "I Will Always Love You" in the style of the Whitney Houston cover version sung by Riley; "Stereo Hearts" by Gym Class Heroes featuring Adam Levine sung by Larsen, Overstreet, Agron and Riley; and Mario's "Let Me Love You" sung by McHale. Other songs that are featured include Cole Porter's "You're the Top" from the musical Anything Goes, "Love Shack" by The B-52's, Michael Bublé's "Home", and a mash-up of two songs entitled "Cherish": The Association song and the Madonna song. Whitney Houston died unexpectedly on February 11, 2012, three days before the episode was scheduled to air and the day after the finished episode was delivered to the network. The producers subsequently announced that they would pay tribute to Houston with a dedication to her in the end credits.

== Reception ==
=== Ratings ===
"Heart" was first broadcast on February 14, 2012, in the United States on Fox. It received a 2.8/8 Nielsen rating/share in the 18–49 demographic, and attracted 6.99 million American viewers during its initial airing, a significant decrease from the 3.3/9 rating/share and 7.81 million viewers of the previous episode, which was broadcast on February 7, 2012, and the lowest rating of the third season to date. In Canada, however, viewership increased, and 1.72 million viewers watched the episode on the same day as its American premiere. It was the thirteenth most-viewed show of the week, up two slots and over 9% from the 1.57 million viewers who watched "The Spanish Teacher" the previous week.

In the United Kingdom, "Heart" first aired on March 22, 2012, and was watched on Sky 1 by 792,000 viewers. Viewership was up slightly from "The Spanish Teacher", which attracted 771,000 viewers when it aired the week before. In Australia, "Heart" was broadcast on March 9, 2012. It was watched by 563,000 viewers, which made Glee the fourteenth most-watched program of the night, down from twelfth the week before. Despite the drop, actual viewership was almost unchanged from the previous episode, "The Spanish Teacher", which was seen by 564,000 viewers.

=== Critical reception ===
"Heart" received a wide range of opinion from reviewers, though the balance was clearly on the positive side. Erica Futterman of Rolling Stone, wrote that it was "thoroughly enjoyable from start to finish", and HuffPost TV's Crystal Bell called it "a standout episode of the season". Bobby Hankinson of The Houston Chronicle characterized it as "sort of terrible" and "unfunny", and IGN's Robert Canning gave it an "okay" grade of 6.5 out of 10, but Canning also acclaimed "the introduction of Rachel's two dads played by Jeff Goldblum and Broadway vet Brian Stokes Mitchell"; he said they were "fantastic" and their schemes regarding the engagement "delightful". Bell called theirs "the most surprising pleasant performances of the night" and added "I absolutely adored these two". Raymund Flandez of The Wall Street Journal summed up their appearance as "annoyingly perfect", and TV Guide's Kate Stanhope devoted an entire article to the pair, wrote, "What's not to like? Seamless chemistry, witty back-and-forth", and noted that their appearance filled out Rachel's backstory. Emily VanDerWerff of The A.V. Club was another who pointed out that you could see, from their characterization, "how Rachel got to be the way she was". Billboard's Rae Votta approved of the episode as a whole and of the Berry parents: "For a pair that have been noticeably absent from the show for two and a half seasons, they cram a ton of character moments into a single scene". VanDerWerff wrote that the scheme by the Berry fathers "to get the two to break off their marriage plans by talking earnestly about teenage lovemaking" was "very, very creepy and just a little unsound, but I sort of like that it suggests to me that, yeah, this is who these guys are." He characterized Hiram and LeRoy as "goofy sitcom characters", unlike Burt or Carole.

Kevin Sullivan of MTV stated that Principal Figgins "stole the show with his outburst and the passing reference to Finchel", and VanDerWerff said his was "a very funny moment in the episode", and also complimented the sequence for having alluded to "how it’s still much harder to have a same-sex kiss on a broadcast network than it is to have Rachel and Finn neck disgustingly". The God Squad, however, was not well received: Canning described it as "conveniently arriving for the sake of one storyline in this episode" and debating "a forced issue that we all knew would result in acceptance", and VanDerWerff pointed out that as "we already know how the other three kids are going to shake out", it was "surprisingly undramatic" and its sole purpose to "watch a new character decide if he's okay with gay people". Futterman, on the other hand, felt that the sequence "tastefully incorporated religion's views into the show's ongoing look at gay relationships".

While the sequence featuring Mercedes singing "I Will Always Love You" was very well received, Entertainment Weekly's Joseph Brannigan Lynch was not happy about the state of Mercedes and Sam's relationship: "If these two don't get together soon, I'm voting we just call the whole thing off, because I'm tired of these false starts." VanDerWerff, referring to the third member of that romantic triangle, wrote that one of the two "tertiary characters" he responded to most was "Shane, who didn’t say anything but gave good cry-face". VanDerWerff's other character was Karofsky, and Michael Slezak of TVLine characterized his scene with Kurt as "electric, with Kurt tenderly giving the 'just friends' speech to Dave". Lynch thought the plot of having Karofsky be Kurt's secret admirer was "vaguely stalker-ish on Karofsky's part, and contrived on the part of the show", and Canning accurately predicted that after Karofsky had been seen by his classmate, it would "just be an episode or two before Karofsky gets bullied into thinking about suicide, if not actually taking his own life".

=== Music and performances ===
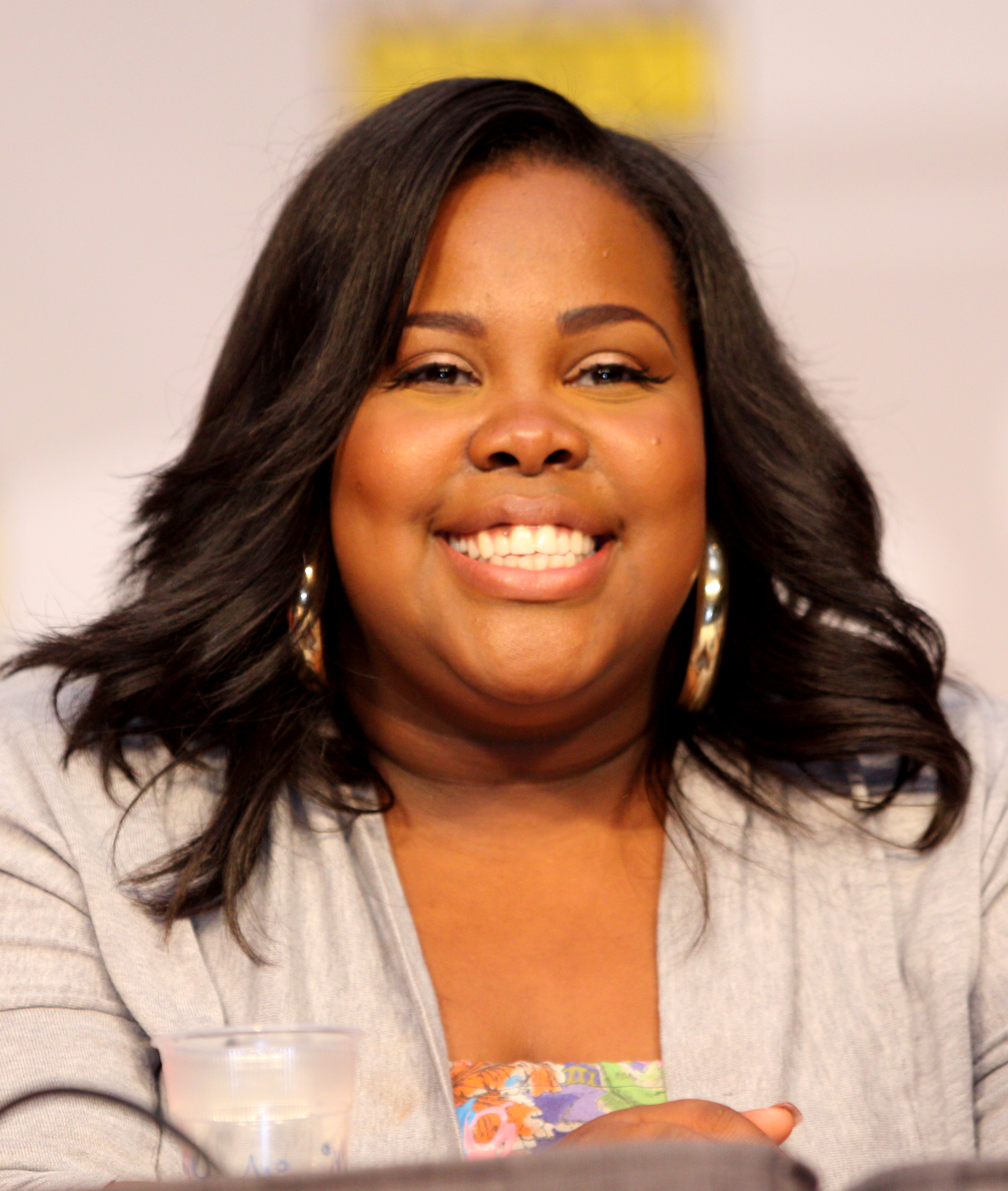
Amber Riley was acclaimed for her performance of "I Will Always Love You"

The theme of the episode—love songs—inspired VanDerWerff to note that such songs "are great for musicals because they pretty much do all of the work necessary in terms of expressing inner emotions and moving the plot forward". He said that "every song in this episode had a clear emotional and plot purpose" except for the "Love Shack" finale. Futterman wrote that the glee club succeeded in finding and performing "the world's greatest love songs", and the reactions from other reviewers were generally favorable as well.

With the death of Whitney Houston three days before the episode aired, a great deal of attention was given to Amber Riley's performance of Houston's hit during the episode, "I Will Always Love You", and its unexpected function as a tribute to the singer. Reviews were glowing: Amy Reiter of The Los Angeles Times called it a "gorgeous, lush take" that was "definitely an episode highlight", and Bell described is as "a beautiful cover", "the perfect song for Mercedes to sing to Sam" and a "haunting performance". Flandez wrote that it was a "heart-rending love song that becomes a homage of the 48-year-old fallen star", and "brought goosebumps"; the shot near the end, "of Mercedes dressed in a sweetheart gown, standing alone, reaching for the stars, was memorable". The Washington Post's Jen Chaney said that "Riley deserves a standing ovation", and that she sang the song with "a power motivated by genuine emotions that tied in directly to her storyline"; the "heartbreaking context of Houston's death ... immediately elevated this moment to the very best one of Glee's entire third season." In December 2012, TV Guide listed the rendition as one of Glee's best performances.

Chaney characterized Tina and Mike's duet of "L-O-V-E" as "cute and buoyant" and gave it an "A−", and Bell called it "absolute perfection". While Slezak praised their "sweet vocals", he wondered why their "rare moment in the spotlight had to serve as a backdrop to the Artie-Sugar-Rory triangle" and gave the performance a "B". Chaney thought the "quick edits actually gave the song a nice energy, but also prevented us from seeing more of Tina and Mike dancing", which she said "was a shame". Flandez and Lynch both praised Mike's singing; Lynch said his "voice sounded great", and Flandez declared that "Mike has really come into his own as a singer". For "Let Me Love You", Lynch wrote that "Artie busted out some serious sex appeal" and gave the "spot-on smooth" performance a "B+". He also described Artie as "effortlessly convincing" on the song. Slezak bestowed an "A−" and said, "Artie finally finds an R&B jam that lets him get his swag on and fits his voice to a tee!" Votta made mention of "Kurt, Sam, Puck and Mike doing an impressive job as boyband style backup", but Chaney called the performance, including the choreography, "underwhelming" and gave it a "C" grade.

Futterman noted that "Rory's a natural to sing Bublé" on "Home" and Chaney said he "sang it nicely enough", but neither expressed much enthusiasm about the rendition, and Chaney gave it a "C" grade. Slezak and Lynch were slightly more generous with their matching grades of "C+", but were also unimpressed: Lynch declared it "too schmaltzy for my tastes", and Slezak admitted he doesn't "get" McGinty. The two songs sung by Hiram and LeRoy Berry received little comment, in part due to their brevity. Chaney was disappointed that "Chapel of Love" was so brief, while Lynch called it "acceptably fun", and similarly approved of "You're the Top", which he called "goofy, lighthearted family fun". Futterman characterized the latter song as "appropriately over-the-top", though Slezak maintained that "no gay dads in the world would perform this song with their teenage daughter".

The pair of performances by the McKinley High God Squad, however, received rather more attention. The first, "Stereo Hearts", received a trio of "B−" grades from reviewers: Chaney said it was "a bit much" but "semi-enjoyable", Slezak described it as a "somewhat bland rendition", and Lynch wrote that "Joe Hart's vocal debut on Glee proper was fine, but Sam's rapping was not". Bell said "Mercedes was flawless" and then called the song's rapping "one major flaw", but Futterman wrote that "Sam wins for most surprising Glee vocalist by convincingly taking on Travie McCoy's rap". Flandez said that the "voices melded well together". The "Cherish" mash-up was better received, and garnered grades from "B" up to "A−", the highest from Slezak, who deemed it a "delicious" dessert. Lynch said "Quinn sounded great" with his "B" grade, and Chaney's "peppy, sweet number" was attached to a "B+". Flandez called it a "cute mashup", and VanDerWerff said the rendition was "nice and understated".

Hankinson, despite his criticism of the episode, liked "Love Shack" so much it was his favorite song of the episode, and Futterman called it a "well-executed note" on which to end the show. Both Lynch and Slezak said that Blaine failed to project the campiness the song required, and that they were glad Kurt took over from him. Their grades were quite different: Slezak gave a "C−", while Lynch, who complimented Mercedes as well as Kurt, bestowed a "B+". Chaney was more enthusiastic than both and gave the "rousing" cover an "A": she was enthusiastic about Criss "bebopping all over the place", and also noted that "the most entertaining all-company performances on Glee are the ones where it's clear how much fun everyone had during filming".

=== Chart history ===
Two of the episode's eight released singles debuted on the Billboard Hot 100: "I Will Always Love You" debuted at number eighty-seven on sales of 36,000 downloads, and "Stereo Hearts" debuted at number ninety. The same two songs also debuted on the Billboard Canadian Hot 100, but in the reverse order: "Stereo Hearts" was at number seventy-four, and "I Will Always Love You" was at number ninety-two.
