= Loser like Me =

Loser like Me may refer to:

- "Loser like Me" (Glee episode), episode of American television series Glee
- "Loser like Me" (song), song performed by the cast of Glee
