= Loser like Me (Glee episode) =

- Glee episode
- A scene in which Will tries to convince Rachel to find a purpose in her life.
- Episode no.: Season 6 Episode 1
- Directed by: Bradley Buecker
- Written by: Ryan Murphy; Brad Falchuk; Ian Brennan
- Production code: 6ARC01
- Original air date: January 9, 2015

Guest appearances
- Brian Stokes Mitchell as LeRoy Berry; Iqbal Theba as Principal Figgins; Max Adler as Dave Karofsky; Jim Rash as Lee Paulblatt; Max George as Clint; Carrot Top as Blartie; Jim J. Bullock as Cert; Marshall Williams as Spencer Porter; Noah Guthrie as Roderick; Christopher Cousins as Superintendent Bob Harris; Heather Mazur as Publicist Nancy

Episode chronology
← Previous "The Untitled Rachel Berry Project"	Next → "Homecoming"
- Glee season 6

"Loser like Me" is the premiere episode of the sixth season of the American musical television series Glee, and the 109th overall. The episode was written by all the series creators Ryan Murphy, Brad Falchuk, and Ian Brennan, directed by Bradley Buecker, and first aired on January 9, 2015 on Fox in the United States along with the next episode, "Homecoming", as a special two-hour premiere.

The episode features the start of a new school year at McKinley High, but Principal Sylvester (Jane Lynch) has disbanded all the arts. Following the epic failure of the first episode of her semi-autobiographical live TV series, Rachel Berry (Lea Michele) has decided to reinstate the arts and reviving New Directions at McKinley with the help of her best friend Kurt Hummel (Chris Colfer). Blaine Anderson (Darren Criss) is now the coach of the Dalton Academy Warblers, and Will Schuester (Matthew Morrison) is coaching McKinley’s bitter rivals, Vocal Adrenaline.

The episode received positive reviews from critics, most of them remarking how the episode reminds of Glee's first seasons.

== Plot ==
After Rachel Berry’s (Lea Michele) television show, That’s So Rachel, was a huge failure, she returns to her home in Lima and finds out that her parents are getting divorced and selling her childhood home.

Blaine Anderson (Darren Criss) is the coach of the Dalton Academy Warblers, because he started failing all of his NYADA classes and got kicked out after the break-up of his relationship with Kurt Hummel (Chris Colfer). Sam Evans (Chord Overstreet) is the Assistant football coach at McKinley High, and helps Coach Beiste (Dot-Marie Jones). Kurt, at NYADA, is allowed to leave school and New York because of a work-study program. He goes back to Lima to get Blaine back. Rachel goes to the Lima school board and convinces the superintendent to reinstate New Directions, but he wants Rachel to lead it. She asks Kurt for his help and Sue Sylvester (Jane Lynch) opposes. Will Schuester (Matthew Morrison) is now the coach of New Direction's rival, Vocal Adrenaline.

Kurt meets with Blaine at a gay bar, and tells him he is sorry and that he will get Blaine back. Blaine tells Kurt that he is now dating someone, and Kurt starts to panic. Dave Karofsky (Max Adler) comes over and it is revealed that he is Blaine's new boyfriend. Kurt, sad, goes to the restrooms and starts to cry.

Will visits Rachel in his old office where she expresses that Broadway is still her dream. This episode ends with Rachel, excited for a new journey, putting up a Glee sign-up sheet.

== Production ==
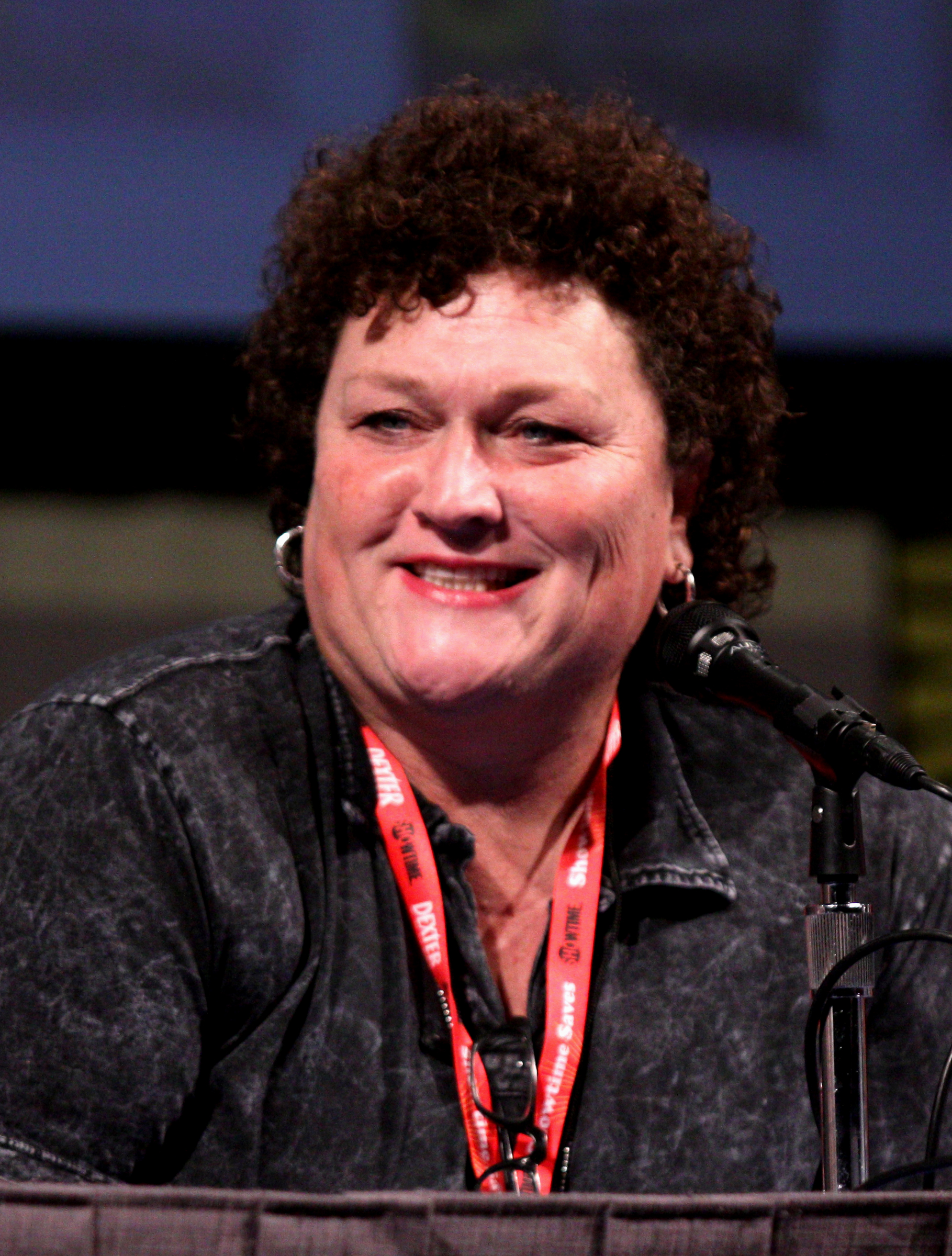
This episode marks the promotion of Dot-Marie Jones to the main cast from her previous guest-star status.

Returning recurring characters that appear in the episode include McKinley High's ex-principal Figgins (Iqbal Theba), former bully Dave Karofsky (Max Adler), the Superintendent Bob Harris (Christopher Cousins), the showrunner of Rachel's series Lee Paulblatt (Jim Rash), and one of Rachel's dads LeRoy Berry (Brian Stokes Mitchell). Three new recurring characters were introduced: the new lead singer of Vocal Adrenaline, Clint (Max George), new student Roderick (Noah Guthrie), and Spencer Porter (Marshall Williams), a gay jock who plays football. Effective with this episode, former recurring guest star Dot-Marie Jones as Shannon Beiste joins the main cast after four years of being a guest star. Actress and singer Amber Riley, who plays Mercedes Jones, returns to the main cast in this episode, although she is absent. Melissa Benoist, Alex Newell, Blake Jenner, Becca Tobin, Jacob Artist, Naya Rivera, and Jenna Ushkowitz (Marley Rose, Wade "Unique" Adams, Ryder Lynn, Kitty Wilde, Jake Puckerman, Santana Lopez, and Tina Cohen-Chang respectively) were demoted to recurring guest stars. However, Melissa Benoist does not return for the final season, although she was invited.

The episode features five musical cover versions. Two of them are performed by Michele as Rachel Berry, which are "Uninvited" by Alanis Morissette and "Let It Go" by Idina Menzel from Frozen. Michele and Criss perform "Suddenly Seymour" from Little Shop of Horrors, while Criss and the Dalton Academy Warblers perform Ed Sheeran's "Sing". Max George sings "Dance the Night Away" by Van Halen with Vocal Adrenaline. Accompanying the music from this episode, the EP Glee: The Music, Loser Like Me was released on January 5, 2015.

Michele later disclosed on Jimmy Kimmel Live! that while filming her cover of "Let It Go" for this episode, a production error caused her to accidentally vomit on set.

== Reception ==
=== Ratings ===
The episode received 2.34 million viewers and a 0.7/2 on adult 18-49, making the sixth-season premiere the least watched season premiere in the show's history.

=== Critical response ===
"Loser like Me" was given positive reviews by critics. Lauren Hoffman from Vulture said that the episode was "filed by emotion" and that it was "funny, smart, extremely meta, and genuinely touching at time". Christopher Rogers from Hollywood Life said that he "totally loved the season six premiere and feel that Glee’s going to go out with a bang". The A.V. Club's Brandon Nowalk said that "Loser like Me" makes the viewers to still watch the show and to "get back in the game" of Glee. "'Loser like Me' is a smooth transition from season five back to, say, season three or four", he said. Miranda Wicker from TV Fanatic expressed that she can't quit watching Glee. "Once the New Directions get in your blood they're there to stay", she said.
