= The Porters of Hellsgate =

Los Angeles-based classical theatre company

The Porters of Hellsgate Theatre Co. is a Los Angeles–based classical theatre company that was founded in 2006 by Edward Castuera, Jack Leahy and Charles Pasternak. It is a member organization of the LA Stage Alliance. The Porters are working their way through the works of Shakespeare, with the goal of becoming the first theatre company in the city of Los Angeles to perform the entire Shakespearean canon. In addition to classical pieces, the company also occasionally takes on new works, often written or translated by company members.

The current board of directors consists of Charles Pasternak (Artistic Director), Thomas Bigley (Associate Artistic Director), Gus Krieger (Associate Artistic Director; Head of New Works), Nick Neidorf (Managing Director; Sound Designer & Composer), Will Block (Production Manager), Jono Eiland (Production Manager), and Alicia Gibson (Production Manager).

== Shakespeare Productions ==
- 2019 Romeo and Juliet
- 2019 The Two Noble Kinsmen
- 2019 Double Falsehood
- 2019 The Taming of the Shrew
- 2018 Cymbeline
- 2018 The Tempest
- 2017 King John
- 2017 Pericles
- 2016 Henry VI
- 2015 Othello
- 2014 The Winter's Tale
- 2014 Henry V
- 2013 Timon of Athens
- 2013 King Lear
- 2012 Measure for Measure
- 2012 The Merry Wives of Windsor
- 2012 Troilus and Cressida
- 2011 The Merchant of Venice
- 2010 The Comedy of Errors
- 2010 Hamlet
- 2009 King Richard II
- 2008 Love's Labours Lost
- 2008 Macbeth
- 2008 Much Ado About Nothing
- 2007/2008 Two Gentlemen of Verona
- 2007 Titus Andronicus
- 2007 King Richard III
- 2007 Twelfth Night
- 2006 Julius Caesar

== Other Productions ==
- 2021 The Hunger Artist adapted by and starring Larry Cedar
- 2020 A Christmas Carol
- 2019 A Christmas Carol
- 2014 Breaking Bard by Gus Krieger
- 2013 Sherlock Through the Looking-Glass by Gus Krieger (remount, co-production with The Odyssey Theatre)
- 2013 Orwellian: Rants, Recollections, and Cautionary Tales From The Works of Eric Arthur Blair adapted by Larry Cedar (remount, co-production with The Odyssey Theatre)
- 2013 Sherlock Through the Looking-Glass by Gus Krieger (World Premiere)
- 2013 Orwellian: Rants, Recollections, and Cautionary Tales From The Works of Eric Arthur Blair adapted by Larry Cedar (World Premiere)
- 2013 Limousine, Midnight Blue by Jamey Hecht, PhD
- 2011 Deity Clutch by Gus Krieger (remounted for the Hollywood Fringe Festival)
- 2011 Oedipus the Tyrant by Sophocles, translated by Jamey Hecht, PhD (World Premiere)
- 2010 Deity Clutch by Gus Krieger (World Premiere)
- 2010 Rosencrantz and Guildenstern Are Dead by Tom Stoppard (in rep with Hamlet)

== Notable Artists ==
- Max Adler
- Larry Cedar
- Leon Russom
