= Larry Cedar =

American actor

- Education: University of California, Los Angeles (BA, MFA)
- Occupation: Actor
- Years active: 1978–present

Larry Frank Cedar is an American voice, film and television actor, best known as one of the players of the Children's Television Workshop mathematics show Square One TV on PBS from 1987 to 1994. He played Max, Alex the Butcher's assistant, in a series of commercials for Kroger in 1989. He is also known for playing Leon, the opium-addicted thief and faro dealer, in the acclaimed HBO series Deadwood.

== Life and career ==
Cedar's professional acting career did not begin until shortly after his admission to Hastings Law School when, on an impulse, he decided to audition for, and was accepted into the MFA Theater program at UCLA, from which he graduated in 1978. While there, he won the Hugh O'Brian Acting Competition award for Best Actor, resulting in a one-year artist development contract with Universal Studios. He went on to star in various television films, and numerous episodics and feature films, including a starring role opposite Rebecca De Mornay in the Ivan Reitman-produced Feds, and an appearance as The Creature on the Wing, opposite John Lithgow, in the Steven Spielberg remake, Twilight Zone: The Movie, directed by George Miller. He has also won an L.A. Theater Alliance Ovation Award for Best Featured Actor in a Musical. Other actors in Cedar's family include Jon Cedar and George Cedar.

Cedar spent six seasons in New York starring in the award-winning PBS series Square One TV, and later starred in 40 episodes of the Fox television series A.J.'s Time Travelers. A veteran stage performer, he appeared in the one-man play Billy Bishop Goes to War at the Colony Theatre. He has been nominated for two Los Angeles Theater Alliance Ovation awards for his performances in Anything Goes (as Lord Oakley) opposite Rachel York, and in She Loves Me (as Sipos, for which he won Best Featured Actor in a Musical). His other stage work includes portraying Hoagy Carmichael in Hoagy, Bix, and Wolfgang Beethoven Bunkhaus at L.A.'s Mark Taper Forum; as Vernon opposite Lea Thompson in They're Playing Our Song; and as Secretary Thompson in 1776 opposite Roger Rees.

In August 2008, Cedar appeared in Towelhead, the directorial debut of Alan Ball (creator of Six Feet Under). He co-starred opposite Adrien Brody as the demented Chester Sinclair in the Ben Affleck/Diane Lane noir feature film Hollywoodland, directed by Allen Coulter, and recurred for three seasons as Leon, the opium-addicted card dealer and thief, in the David Milch helmed HBO series Deadwood opposite Powers Boothe and Ian McShane. His independent film work includes the award-winning short Tel Aviv, the science fiction thriller Forecast, and the full-length horror film Midnight Son. He has also done voice-over work for hundreds of commercials, cartoon series, and video games.

In 2010, Cedar had a role in The Crazies, playing Principal Ben Sandborn. From 2011 to 2012 he portrayed Cornelius Hawthorne, father of Chevy Chase's character Pierce Hawthorne, on 2 episodes of Community.

Cedar is active in the Los Angeles theatre community. In 2013 he starred in King Lear with The Porters of Hellsgate. For the 2013 Hollywood Fringe Festival, he developed the script for Orwellian: Rants, Recollections, and Cautionary Tales From The Works of Eric Arthur Blair, which is a one-hour adaptation of three works by George Orwell: Down and Out in Paris and London, Animal Farm, and Nineteen Eighty-Four. The play was produced by The Porters of Hellsgate in conjunction with the Orwell estate.

== Filmography ==
=== Film ===
Year	Title	Role	Notes
1983	Twilight Zone: The Movie	Gremlin	Segment: "Nightmare at 20,000 Feet"
1984	Dreamscape	Snakeman	
1987	The Hidden	Brem	
1988	Feds	Howard Butz	
1989	C.H.U.D. II: Bud the C.H.U.D.	Graves	
1992	Demonic Toys	Peterson	
1992	The Babe	Radio Announcer	
1996	Pinocchio's Revenge	District Attorney	
1998	Fear and Loathing in Las Vegas	Car Rental Agent	
2002	The Master of Disguise	Businessman	
2004	Paparazzi	Charlie	
2005	Constantine	Vermin Man	
2004	The Gingerdead Man	Jimmy Dean	
2006	The Ant Bully	Ant #8 (voice)	
2006	Hollywoodland	Chester Sinclair	
2007	Towelhead	Photographer	
2007	National Treasure: Book of Secrets	Control Room Guard	
2010	The Crazies	Ben Sandborn	
2014	Atlas Shrugged Part III: Who Is John Galt?	Floyd Ferris	
2014	The Snow Queen 2	Eric (voice)	English dub
2015	Justice League: Throne of Atlantis	Thomas Curry (voice)	Direct-to-video
2015	Justice League: Gods and Monsters	Pete Ross (voice)	Direct-to-video
2025	Abraham's Boys	Father Leon	

=== Television ===
Year	Title	Role	Notes
1978	Battlestar Galactica	Cadet Shields	Episode: "The Gun on Ice Planet Zero"
1979	The Omega Connection	Roger Pike	Television film
1980	M*A*S*H	Soldier	Episode: "The Letters"
1984	W*A*L*T*E*R	Zipkin	Failed television pilot
1987–1991	Square One Television	Various characters	231 episodes
1990–1991	Get a Life	Ted	2 episodes
1991	Saved by the Bell	Steven Jameson	Episode: "Mystery Weekend"
1994	Star Trek: Deep Space Nine	Nydrom	Episode: "Armageddon Game"
1995–1997	Freakazoid!	Oblongata, Anton Mohans, Hans, Bernt, Chip Clavicle (voice)	5 episodes
1995–1998	Pinky and the Brain	Various voices	7 episodes
1996	Star Trek: Voyager	Tersa	Episode: "Alliances"
1996	Animaniacs	Andrew Lloyd Webber (voice)	Episode: "Dot's Entertainment"
1997	Cow and Chicken	French Guy, English Guy (voice)	Episode: "Law of Gravity"
1997–1999	Superman: The Animated Series	First Mate, Restaurant Owner (voice)	2 episodes
1999	Pinky, Elmyra & the Brain	Salesman (voice)	Episode: "A Walk in the Park"
1999	The Sylvester & Tweety Mysteries	Potter, Conductor (voice)	2 episodes
1999–2000	Batman Beyond	Pilot, Manor Cop (voice)	2 episodes
2001	Samurai Jack	Mr. Pibbles, Doorman (voice)	Episode: "Jack and the Gangsters"
2002	The Zeta Project	Gate Guard (voice)	Episode: "Wired"
2002	Star Trek: Enterprise	Tessic	Episode: "Marauders"
2004–2006	Deadwood	Leon	24 episodes
2005	Stargate SG-1	Ori Prior #2	Episode: "Origin"
2005	Without a Trace	Ray Pallidies	Episode: "Freefall"
2006	Boston Legal	Robert Hooper	Episode: "The Cancer Man Can"
2006	Charmed	Xar	Episode: "Engaged and Confused"
2006	Ben 10	Howell Wainwright, Head Scientist (voice)	Episode: "A Small Problem"
2006–2009	Two and a Half Men	Policeman, Announcer	2 episodes
2007	The Riches	Karl	Episode: "This Is Your Brain on Drugs"
2007	State of Mind	Larry Carson	Episode: "Between Here and There"
2009	Terminator: The Sarah Connor Chronicles	Detective Crayton	Episode: "Adam Raised a Cain"
2011–2012	Community	Cornelius Hawthorne	2 episodes
2017	The Last Tycoon	Harold Grife	Episode: "More Stars Than There Are in Heaven"
2020	Young Sheldon	Lawrence	Episode: "A Docent, A Little Lady and a Bouncer Named Dalton"

=== Video games ===
Year	Title	Role	Notes
2002	Tony Hawk's Pro Skater 4	San Francisco Bike Messenger	
2003	Tony Hawk's Underground	Slave Driver, Tampa Cop, Team Filmer	
2003	SOCOM II U.S. Navy SEALs	Vandal	
2004	Tony Hawk's Underground 2	Additional voices	
2004	EverQuest II	Various voices	
2005	Shadow of Rome	Maecanas	
2005	Ultimate Spider-Man	Additional voices	
2006	Marvel: Ultimate Alliance	Loki	
2011	Star Wars: The Old Republic	Additional voices	
2012	Hitman: Absolution	Edward Wade	
2021	Romeo is a Dead Man	Benjamin Stargazer	
