= Sam Evans =

Fictional character from the Fox series Glee

- Glee character
- Chord Overstreet as Sam Evans in Glee
- First appearance: "Audition" (2010)
- Last appearance: "Dreams Come True" (2015)
- Created by: Ryan Murphy; Brad Falchuk; Ian Brennan
- Portrayed by: Chord Overstreet

In-universe information
- Occupation: High school student (graduated); Model (formerly); Glee club coach (currently)
- Family: Dwight Evans (father); Mary Evans (mother); Stevie Evans (younger brother); Stacey Evans (younger sister)
- Significant others: Quinn Fabray; Mercedes Jones; Brittany Pierce; Santana Lopez
- Religion: Christian

Sam Evans is a fictional character from the Fox musical comedy-drama series Glee. The character is portrayed by actor Chord Overstreet, and appeared on Glee starting with the second season premiere episode entitled "Audition", first broadcast on September 21, 2010. Sam is a transfer student to William McKinley High School who becomes a member of the football team, as well as a member of the glee club, New Directions. In his first episode, Sam performs Travie McCoy's "Billionaire" with some of the guys in the glee club, but Finn ends up mocking Sam because of his talent and terrifies Sam. Because of Finn’s mean tricks he does not show up for tryouts due to the low social status of the club's members. He later joins, nonetheless.

The character has been mostly well received by television critics. Amy Semigran of MTV commented, "Turns out their strategy, as well as Sam's crush on singing partner Quinn Fabray, worked. Despite some mixed signals and apprehension on Quinn's part, the two turned out a cute little rendition of Jason Mraz and Colbie Caillat's 'Lucky'." Overstreet has said that he takes pieces of himself and puts it into his character. Glee's writers have incorporated aspects of Overstreet's personality and mannerisms into his character, such as his impersonations and Nashville background. As a member of the glee club, Sam regularly sings on the show, and has performed a number of solos and duets. In the final season, Sam is the assistant coach of the football team along with helping out with the Glee club. In the final episode, Sam becomes the director of New Directions after Will Schuester is named the principal of McKinley High.

== Storylines ==
=== Season 2 ===
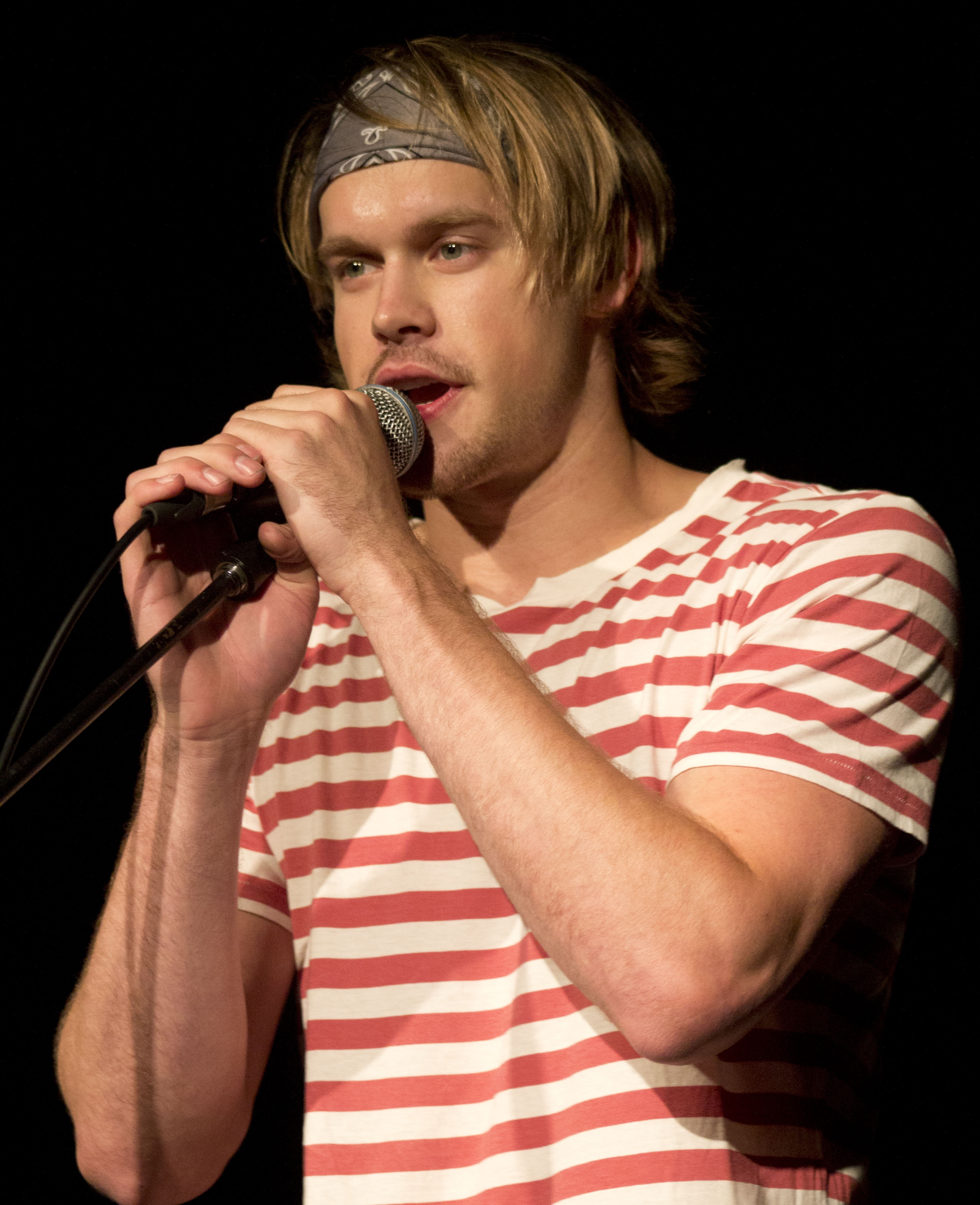
Chord Overstreet (pictured) plays Sam

Sam first appears on Glee during the first episode of the show's second season. He is recruited for the school glee club, New Directions, by the club co-captain—and also football quarterback and team captain—Finn Hudson (Cory Monteith), and performs Travie McCoy's "Billionaire" with Finn, Puck (Mark Salling), Artie (Kevin McHale) and Mike (Harry Shum, Jr.). Because of his talent, Finn gets jealous and tells Sam that his mouth size doesn’t deserve him a spot in the glee club. Despite his initial enthusiasm, Sam does not show up for the formal audition because Finn was mean to him causing him to get kicked off the football team, and because of the low social status of the glee club members. In "Grilled Cheesus", with Sam as quarterback and Finn returned to the team, Sam is injured during a play suggested by Finn, restoring Finn to quarterback. Sam officially joins the glee club in "Duets". Kurt Hummel (Chris Colfer) immediately shows interest in him, thinking Sam is gay; Sam is unaware of Kurt's reasons, and agrees to be Kurt's duet partner because Kurt's a good singer, holding to his word despite Finn manipulating him against duetting with another guy. Kurt ultimately calls off their duet to save Sam's reputation. After a slushee is thrown in his face, Quinn helps him clean up, and they later become partners in the glee club's duets competition. Sam and Quinn sing "Lucky" by Jason Mraz and Colbie Caillat, and win when Finn and Rachel Berry (Lea Michele) vote for them to encourage Sam to stay in the club. Over dinner at Breadstix they form a rapport, and Quinn tells Sam that she considers the meal their first date.

In "Furt", Sam tells Quinn that he loves her and offers her a promise ring, which she initially will not accept. After another member of the football team, Dave Karofsky (Max Adler), steps up his bullying of Kurt because of Kurt's sexuality, Artie and Mike confront him, and Sam joins the fight when the two are knocked down. Later, impressed by the way Sam stood up for Kurt, Quinn begins wearing his promise ring. In "Comeback", Sam establishes a one-man tribute band to teen singer Justin Bieber, hoping to win over his girlfriend Quinn, who he suspects still has feelings for her ex-boyfriend Finn. He performs "Baby", dedicated to Quinn, and also excites the other girls in the club. Puck, Artie and Mike are impressed by the effect he has on the girls, and convince him to let them join his tribute band; the four later perform "Somebody to Love", to the delight of all the girls in the glee club, and Quinn chooses Sam over Finn. When Santana Lopez (Naya Rivera) convinces Sam that Quinn cheated on him with Finn, he breaks up with her and begins dating Santana, though she later dumps him when she announces that she has fallen in love with Karofsky. Sam's father loses his job and their house is foreclosed on, forcing the family of five to live in a single motel room; he hides this from the glee club until it comes out in "Rumours". When Rachel and Mercedes Jones ask Sam to take them to the junior prom, sharing in their "prom on a budget" scheme in "Prom Queen", he agrees. In the season two finale episode "New York", Sam hugs Mercedes after the New Directions finishes performing at the Nationals competition. Back in Ohio, it is revealed that Mercedes and Sam are dating, but it is clear they are keeping it secret.

=== Season 3 ===
Sam's father finds a job out of state and Sam has moved there with his family prior to the third season premiere. His first appearance is not until "Hold on to Sixteen", when Rachel and Finn track him down and recruit him to help New Directions perform at Sectionals. They discover that, unknown to his family and despite being underage, he works in a strip bar in order to help support them—they believe he has a job at a fast food restaurant. Sam gets the permission of his parents to transfer back to McKinley—he will be living with Finn's family—and he helps New Directions defeat their McKinley rivals, the Troubletones at Sectionals. Although Mercedes has found a new boyfriend, Shane, in his absence, Sam tells her boldly that he wants to win her back. He continues to pursue her, including through song, and eventually succeeds in reawakening her feelings toward him. Mercedes ultimately breaks up with Shane in "Heart", but she feels horrible for what she did to him and tells Sam she will not go out with him until she is sure of her feelings.

In "Saturday Night Glee-ver", after Mercedes tells the class about her father's lack of support for her musical dreams, and says she is worried that she will not be a good enough singer in the real world, Sam films Mercedes singing "Disco Inferno" and secretly posts the video on YouTube. He shows her the enthusiastic comments garnered by the video, and tells her he believes in her. They kiss. They attend the senior prom together in "Prom-asaurus", and New Directions subsequently wins the Nationals competition. During "Goodbye", Mercedes graduates, and will be heading off to California: she has been signed to an independent record label as a backup singer due to the video Sam posted and she will be taking classes at UCLA.

=== Season 4 ===
Sam is shown returning to McKinley High as a senior and, in "The New Rachel", he is shown to be enjoying his newfound popularity amongst teenage girls and the school for his impressions and the Glee Club's National Championship, imitating Taylor Lautner to great fanfare and sitting with the popular kids. He is the first to extend his hand to Marley Rose (Melissa Benoist) after the Glee Club insults her mother, apologizing and connecting with her over being under poverty. Between the next two episodes, "Britney 2.0" and "Makeover", he forges strong friendships with Brittany Pierce (Heather Morris) and Blaine Anderson (Darren Criss). He confronts and saves Brittany in "Britney 2.0" from a downward spiral and consoles her after her election loss in "Makeover", performing Hole's "Celebrity Skin" with her and developing suspiciously romantic feelings for her on the way, and teams up with Blaine for the Presidential Election in McKinley High, subsequently winning, and comforts him over his troubles with Kurt in "Makeover" and "The Role You Were Born to Play". In "Dynamic Duets", Sam demands that Blaine tell him what really happened, and Blaine admits that he hooked with some random guy he befriended on Facebook; Sam comforts him yet again by saying that Blaine hurting Kurt wasn't cool, but if Blaine wants Kurt to forgive him, Blaine has to at least stop antagonizing and killing himself, which leads to them performing David Bowie's "Heroes." He and Brittany then formally begin dating in "Glee, Actually", following New Directions' loss at Sectionals. A month later, it is revealed that Blaine has become romantically attracted towards Sam; later, Blaine eventually confesses to Sam about his crush on him, which Sam doesn't hold against Blaine and takes normally.

=== Season 5 ===
Sam, Blaine and Tina form a trio. Sam and Tina hooked up. Sam didn’t get into college. Sam moves to New York to follow his dreams of becoming a male model. Along the way he begins dating Mercedes Jones once again. They struggle with intimacy. Mercedes wants to wait until marriage for sex, Sam states that he is a 19-year-old boy and has urges. During one of Sam’s modelling shoots, the photographer comes onto him and kisses Sam during the shoot. Sam confesses and Mercedes and Sam break up because Mercedes thinks Sam will resent her in the long term because she doesn't want to have sex with him. Sam fulfills his dream of "getting his junk on the side of a bus," and decides to move back to Ohio.

=== Season 6 ===
In the premiere episode "Loser Like Me", Sam is seen working under Coach Beiste as an assistant football coach. After breaking up with Mercedes, Sam found it difficult to love again and ended up dating Rachel, who was in the same boat, after being hypnotised by Sue. By the end of the series, he becomes the coach of New Directions after Will was offered the role as Principal. 5 years later, in the flashforward scenes of the same episode, Sam is still messaging Mercedes.

== Development ==
Sam is portrayed by actor Chord Overstreet. Unlike much of the original cast, Glee creator Ryan Murphy did not find Overstreet on Broadway. He landed the role after auditioning with Commodores' "Easy" and Gavin DeGraw's "I Don't Want to Be". Before Overstreet's casting, his friend Glen Powell also auditioned for the role. He later sang "Billionaire" by Travie McCoy featuring Bruno Mars as a studio test, and eventually sang this in the season premiere "Audition", along with "Every Rose Has Its Thorn" by Poison. Following Overstreet's casting, media speculation suggested Sam might have been created as a boyfriend for Kurt. Overstreet later confirmed this, but stated that his storyline had been adjusted to pair Sam with Quinn, as a result of the chemistry the producers detected between himself and Agron. Chord Overstreet said of his casting process: "It was like a week long process. I did three or four auditions. I went in the casting office with Robert Ulrich and sang three or four songs. Did the studio test, network test, and I found out the next day and went right into the studio to record 'Billionaire.'"

Discussing his character in an interview with The TV Chick, Overstreet commented: "I think I put a little bit of my personality in him. I would say so. I'm such a nice, sweet guy that you don't even have to act, it's me. I'm kidding, I'm kidding. I'm not that full of myself. It's similar to my personality, I would say. I'm kind of goofy and say stupid things to girls when I'm attracted to them. And when I like them, I say stupid things without thinking like the Avatar stuff, that's very [much] something I would say." Overstreet said that the writers picked up lines from him and gave them to his character:

"Actually, yeah. I had Brad Falchuk call me. He called because he was like 'I hear you do impressions. What impressions do you do?' I was like I do George Bush, I do Matthew McConaughey, a couple of other ones. And he was like 'Alright, well thanks.' And then next thing I know, I get the next episode and they wrote it in there. I thought that was hilarious. I was just like 'YES!' I was so excited to do it, I was like 'Yesss!' Matthew McConaughey!! I wonder if he watches the show. [I wonder] if he watched the show, and saw my impression, God I hope [so]!" [sic]

Executive Producer Brad Falchuk said that the relationship between Sam and Mercedes, revealed at the end of the second season, "was born out of the prom episode", and that the characters "have their reasons" for hiding it for now. However, with Overstreet leaving the show after the second season—his option to become a main character was not picked up, and according to Falchuk he decided not to accept a ten-episode recurring role in the third season with the possibility of further episodes or of becoming a series regular after that—Mercedes finds a new boyfriend during the summer. On October 24, 2011, Murphy officially announced that Sam would be returning as a recurring character starting with the season's eighth episode, "just in time for Sectionals". Overstreet continued as a series regular for the show's remaining three seasons.

== Reception ==
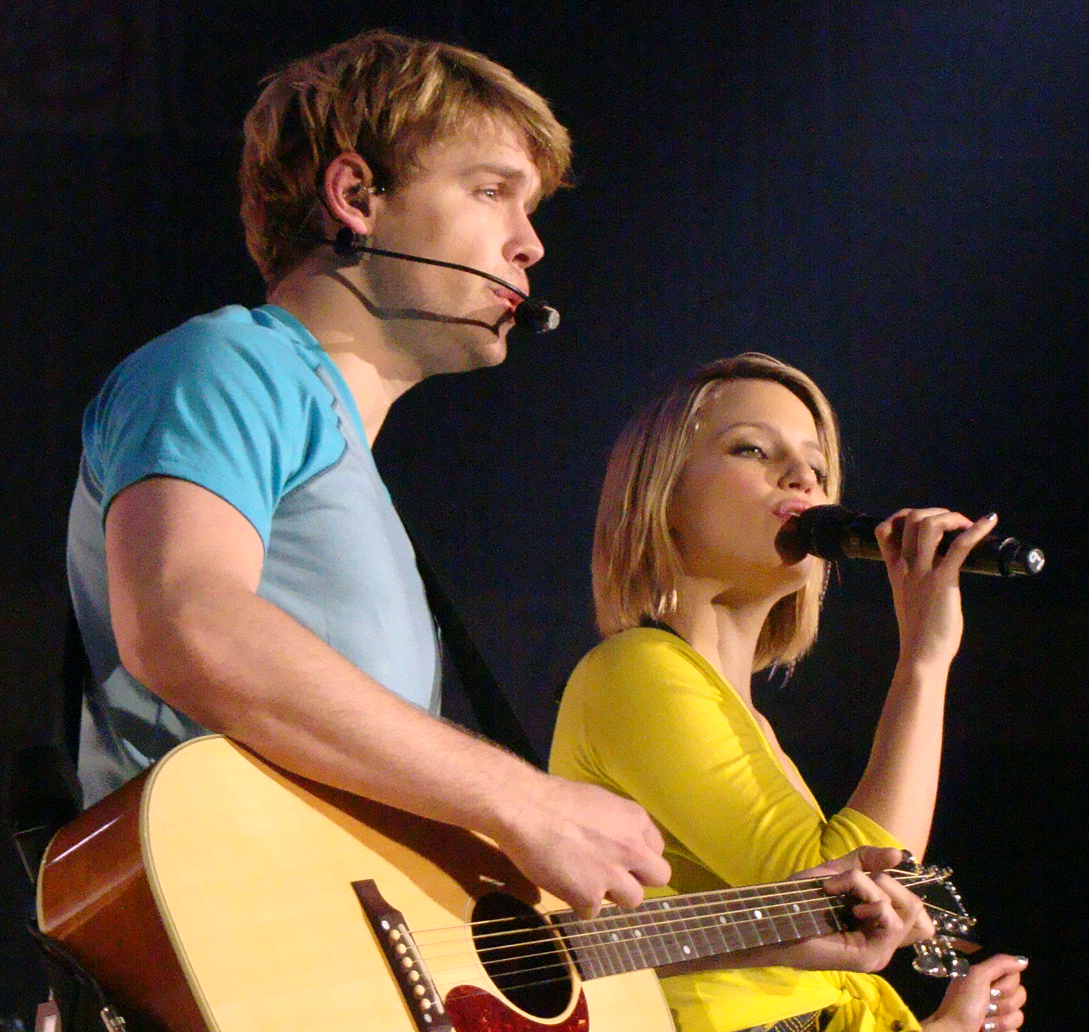
Sam (left) and Quinn (right) performing "Lucky" on the Glee Live! In Concert! tour

The character has received mainly positive reviews from television critics. Amy Semigran of MTV said of the episode "Duets": "Turns out their strategy, as well as Sam's crush on singing partner Quinn, worked. Despite some mixed signals and apprehension on Quinn's part, the two turned out a cute little rendition of Jason Mraz and Colbie Caillat's 'Lucky'. It was so cute, in fact, Mr. Schue awarded them the winners of the challenge and sent them off on what would ultimately turn out to be their first date." The Sam-Quinn relationship has been generally well received by critics. Amy Reiter of the Los Angeles Times commented: "The is-he-gay-or-is-he-straight storyline is resolved as these two sing a button-cute, guitariffic, blonde-meets-blond rendition of Jason Mraz and Colbie Caillat's 'Lucky'. Is Quinn's return to abstinence in danger? Sam-I-Am might not like green eggs and ham, but he sure likes a certain flirty-eyed Cheerio. How do you say 'awww' in Na'vi?"

Anthony Benigno of Daily News commented on the relationship: "Meanwhile, Sam and Quinn are partnered, and Sam, having come from an all-boys school and devoid of social skills, takes Quinn's throwaway Avatar reference and runs with it. Yes, folks: our boy is spitting game in Na'vi. And Quinn's kind of digging it. Remember when I said this show was realistic with its sexual tension stuff? I take it back. Anyway, Quinn's kind of feeling Sam, but she'd rather keep her heart cold and shriveled so as not to risk her popularity again, so she tells him to take his hair and get lost. Problem is, she and Sam were the only team who stood a chance of knocking off Rachel and Finn, so Rachel and Finn cement their plan by singing a thoroughly offensive song (I'll get to that in a bit) and reuniting the giant-killers. And so succeeds evil machination #4. Sam and Quinn go on their free dinner on the condition that it soooo isn't a date. But Sam awkwardly praises Quinn's bravery after her fall from grace, while admitting his own terrible secret: he does, in fact, dye his hair." Benigno continues, "In any case, Quinn's heart grows four sizes and she puts away the gift certificate, because Sam, the gentleman, should pay on the first date. Sam's totally loving it, but wait till he realizes he's suddenly out 50 bucks. That's like, a month's worth of peroxide there, dude."
