= Dave Karofsky =

Fictional character from the Fox series Glee

- Glee character
- Max Adler as Dave Karofsky in Glee
- First appearance: "Mash-Up" (2009)
- Last appearance: "Dreams Come True" (2015)
- Created by: Ryan Murphy; Brad Falchuk; Ian Brennan
- Portrayed by: Max Adler

In-universe information
- Occupation: unknown (currently); High school student (graduated)
- Family: Paul Karofsky (father); Debra Karofsky (mother)

David Karofsky is a recurring fictional character from the Fox musical comedy-drama series Glee. The character is portrayed by actor Max Adler, and has appeared in Glee since its first season episode "Mash-Up", first broadcast on October 21, 2009. Initially known only by his surname, Karofsky was introduced as a bully and a member of the McKinley High football team who slushies football captain Finn (Cory Monteith), and who teams with fellow athlete and bully Azimio (James Earl) to torment various fellow students, usually members of the school glee club, New Directions. Later in the season, he is identified as a member of the football team, and is a football player in the second season. Karofsky is revealed to be gay early in that season. He is closeted and remains so at the end of the season, though he has stopped bullying and has won the election for Junior Prom King. He transfers to another school for his senior year, but is outed there and attempts suicide after being bullied by his classmates, though he is saved by his father.

Karofsky was initially used as an ordinary jock bully, but Adler's acting impressed show co-creator Ryan Murphy; he expanded Karofsky's role in the show's second season by having him especially target gay glee club member Kurt Hummel (Chris Colfer), only to turn out to be gay himself, though closeted. That revelation sparked a wave of reaction from people who thought it was important for Glee to show "the confusion and the torture one person can put themselves through being closeted". Reviewers have been impressed with Adler's portrayal of Karofsky, including Michael Slezak of TVLine, who in the second season characterized it as "surprisingly nuanced" and with a "terrific amount of depth", and Billboard's Rae Votta, who wrote in the third season, "As always, Kurt and Karofsky's scenes shine as the strongest in whichever episode they're featured."

== Storylines ==
In the first season of Glee, Karofsky appears in five episodes. He is a jock and a bully, initially a member of the McKinley High hockey team. He is first seen in the episode "Mash-Up", where he slushies football captain Finn Hudson (Cory Monteith). He reappears in "Mattress", teamed with football player Azimio (James Earl) and writes on Finn's face with black markers to demonstrate how they will deface the glee club's yearbook photo, which Karofsky does at the end of the episode. By "Theatricality" he is on the football team with Azimio and they shove Kurt Hummel (Chris Colfer) and Tina Cohen-Chang (Jenna Ushkowitz) against lockers for wearing Lady Gaga costumes—part of a glee club assignment—around school.

Karofsky is featured in the first eleven episodes of the second season continuing his bullying ways; in the sixth episode "Never Been Kissed", he especially targets Kurt who is gay. After he slams Kurt into a locker, Kurt chases after and confronts him and an increasingly agitated Karofsky abruptly grabs Kurt and kisses him. Before Karofsky can initiate a second kiss, a stunned Kurt shoves him away and Karofsky leaves. Kurt and his new gay friend Blaine Anderson (Darren Criss) later try to talk to him about being gay and closeted, but he denies that the kiss happened and soon resumes his bullying. He even threatens to kill Kurt if he tells anyone else about the kiss. Kurt's father Burt (Mike O'Malley) finds out about the threat but not the kiss, and at a meeting with Karofsky's father says that Kurt felt threatened. Karofsky is soon expelled but is allowed to return by the school board because no physical violence to Kurt had been witnessed. Scared, Kurt transfers to Dalton Academy to get away from him.

The football team has clinched a spot in the championship game, but animosity is running high between glee and non-glee members and harming the team's performance. In "The Sue Sylvester Shuffle", Coach Beiste (Dot-Marie Jones) and glee club director Will Schuester (Matthew Morrison) force the entire football team to join the glee club for a week to settle their differences and dispel their prejudices. Karofsky is praised by Will as a good performer and dancer but when the hockey team attacks the football team for their low-status glee club activities, Karofsky leads a walkout from the joint rehearsals by all the non-glee members, and Beiste kicks them off the team. On championship night, the team members—except for Karofsky—relent just before the half-time show which the team and glee club perform together. Karofsky joins in when he sees the crowd's positive reaction to the start of the half-time show, a mashup of "Thriller" and "Heads Will Roll"; the full team ultimately wins the game. Finn approaches Karofsky about joining the glee club and apologizing to Kurt, but Karofsky rejects his suggestion out of hand since the championship victory has him back on top of the social ladder.

Karofsky appears in three additional episodes later in the second season. Santana Lopez (Naya Rivera) decides in the episode "Born This Way" that she wants to become prom queen. She sees Karofsky and realizes he would be a credible prom king partner moments before she sees him checking out a male student's butt and also realizes he is as closeted as she is. She then blackmails him into teaming up with her as a pretend couple—beards—and starting an anti-bullying club, with the purpose of getting Kurt to return to McKinley and New Directions. Karofsky apologizes to Kurt for his bullying in a meeting with Will, Principal Figgins (Iqbal Theba) and their respective fathers Paul (Daniel Roebuck) and Burt. Kurt is happy to be able to transfer back. In "Prom Queen", Karofsky and Santana arrange to guard Kurt at school when they learn he will be bringing Blaine as his prom date; Karofsky tells Kurt, tearfully, that he is sorry for what he did to him. At the prom, Karofsky is voted prom king but Santana is not elected prom queen. Instead, an appalled Kurt is written in and wins. As they take the floor for the traditional prom king and queen dance, Kurt suggests that this is Karofsky's chance to come out and "make a difference" but Karofsky is not ready to do so and walks away.

He next appears in the third-season episode "The First Time". He has transferred to another high school from McKinley for his senior year, fearing that he might be outed if he stayed. He sees Kurt in a gay bar and tells Kurt he has become a regular there and feels accepted. He is Kurt's secret admirer for Valentine's Day in the episode "Heart" and after Kurt gently turns him down, he is recognized by a classmate who later spreads the word to others in the school that Karofsky is gay. In "On My Way", he is taunted and bullied by his athletic teammates and by others at school and using online media, so severely that he attempts to hang himself, but is saved by his father in time. Kurt visits Karofsky in the hospital where Karofsky tells Kurt his best friend never wants to see him again and how his mother thinks he has a disease and can be "cured". Karofsky, in tears the whole time, again apologizes to Kurt saying he made Kurt's life hell but he couldn't handle it himself. The two agree to become friends.

In the fifth season he appears in a nightmare Rachel has about her opening night of Funny Girl. In the sixth season, Karofsky has calmed down and is dating Blaine but when he finds out that Blaine still loves Kurt they break up on good terms. Karofsky appeared in the series finale at the end where he joined the entirety of the Glee club on stage for their final performance.

== Development ==
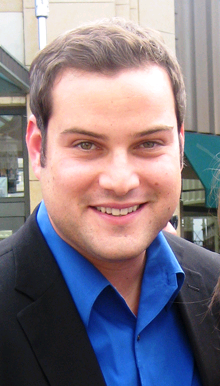
Max Adler portrays Dave Karofsky

Dave Karofsky is played by actor Max Adler, who first appeared in the first season episode "Mash-Up", initially as a member of the William McKinley High School hockey team. Karofsky began as a background character who tormented members of the glee club, and was known only by his surname. So far as Adler knew, his role was for a single episode only, but he returned once more before the first half of the first season ended, and then three times in the nine episodes of the second half of that season. The last of these, "Theatricality", written and directed by series co-creator Ryan Murphy, proved to be pivotal: Murphy was impressed with his acting and wanted to write more for him.

Although Karofsky begins the second season as an ordinary jock bully, Murphy hinted to Adler that there would be more in store for the character. According to Adler, Murphy approached him at the second-season premiere and said, "'we just wrote some really good stuff for you for episode six'." The actor recalls, "I had no idea what that meant, until I read it!" Adler had long wondered why his character behaved the way he did: "I thought there's got to be a reason why he's so angry, why he's such a bully, why he's going out of his way to make other people's lives a living hell". Although he had considered various ideas for Karofsky—"maybe he was jealous of the glee club, maybe he was gay, maybe a million different things"—when he got the script for that episode he "was just as shocked as anybody else" when his character kissed Kurt, though he "thought it was so awesome that they would allow this character to go there."

There was a strong reaction from the show's viewers. Adler said, "I've heard from a lot of fans how important this character is for them because it's important to watch the internal struggle, the confusion and the torture one person can put themselves through being closeted." He wants Karofsky to "accept himself and come out because [he thinks] it would be a beacon of hope for everyone else who's struggling", and noted, "people do get hope from Glee." He also said, "I think [Ryan Murphy] trusts me to do what I'm doing with the character, which is one heck of a compliment from him." Murphy has indicated a preference for positive future developments, and said in early January 2011, "This show is by nature optimistic and I think a character like Karofsky could turn to booze or pills or alcohol and kill themselves or do something dark. But I also love Max and I love that character and I sorta want that character to have a happy ending." At one point in the bullying storyline, Karofsky threatens to kill Kurt, a scene that Adler characterized as "very powerful. Chilling, terrifying, horrifying, yet, at the same time, heartbreaking. ... Because there are kids who have messaged me since that episode saying they used to hear that line spoken to them day in and day out at school", and they dreaded school because of it.

In addition to Karofsky's newly revealed sexual orientation, other aspects of his personality have been explored. In "The Sue Sylvester Shuffle", when the football team is forced to spend a week working with the glee club that Karofsky and other members have been bullying, the "softer side" of his personality is seen, especially when he's performing with the club. After the club's director surprises him with a compliment on his performing, Karofsky is the one who suggests that the team perform an extra musical number for the halftime show they are preparing for, though he comes up with a rationale that makes it sound like a necessity to keep up their social status rather than something he particularly wants to do. Adler said, "I feel like that it did make him happy and, obviously, he has some natural abilities that Mr. Schuester was able to spot. I don't think he's ever allowed himself to do that ever in his life, to dance or learn a song, especially to do that in public. ...Doing that was such an obstacle to overcome." In "Furt" and "Born This Way", it is revealed that he had been kind, a cub scout, and an "A" student. However, his behavior had changed for the worse in the former episode before returning to the good in the latter. Although the anti-bullying club formed by Karofsky and Santana in "Born This Way" is created with ulterior motives in mind, Karofsky subsequently makes a tearful apology to Kurt in "Prom Queen", and then insists that Kurt wait for his safety escort after the next class period.

== Reception ==
The first time Karofsky received significant notice from critics was for the second season's sixth episode, "Never Been Kissed". Amy Reiter of the Los Angeles Times commented that it was testament to the writers and cast that Karofsky's kiss startled the audience as much as it did Kurt, and commended the transitioning of Karofsky from a faceless jock into "a nuanced character with a back story and hidden motives of his own." MTV's Aly Semigran wrote that, should the episode inspire a single teenager to have courage in the face of discrimination, or re-consider bullying, it would be an impressive accomplishment. Linda Holmes of National Public Radio dismissed "Never Been Kissed" as "one of the most facile and emotionally inauthentic episodes the show has ever produced", and felt that Karofsky's swift transition from bullying to kissing Kurt was absurd and "emotionally unsound". His appearances over the next few episodes drew only oblique commentary, such as The Atlantic's Kevin Fallon's characterization in his review on "Furt" of the bullying storyline as a "very important arc that's been well-acted by all parties involved". In "The Sue Sylvester Shuffle", The A.V. Club's Emily VanDerWerff wrote, "I thought giving Kurt's bully, Karofsky (...), a miniature story arc that resolved itself only partially was a smart move. Up until now, he's been kind of a walking cliché, and now he gets to be someone who's not all repressed sexuality and monstrous tendencies." Reiter commented, "And best of all, we got to watch Karofsky's character develop a bit more. It was nice to see him let loose a little and dance, but all his back-and-forthing about glee was a little confusing."

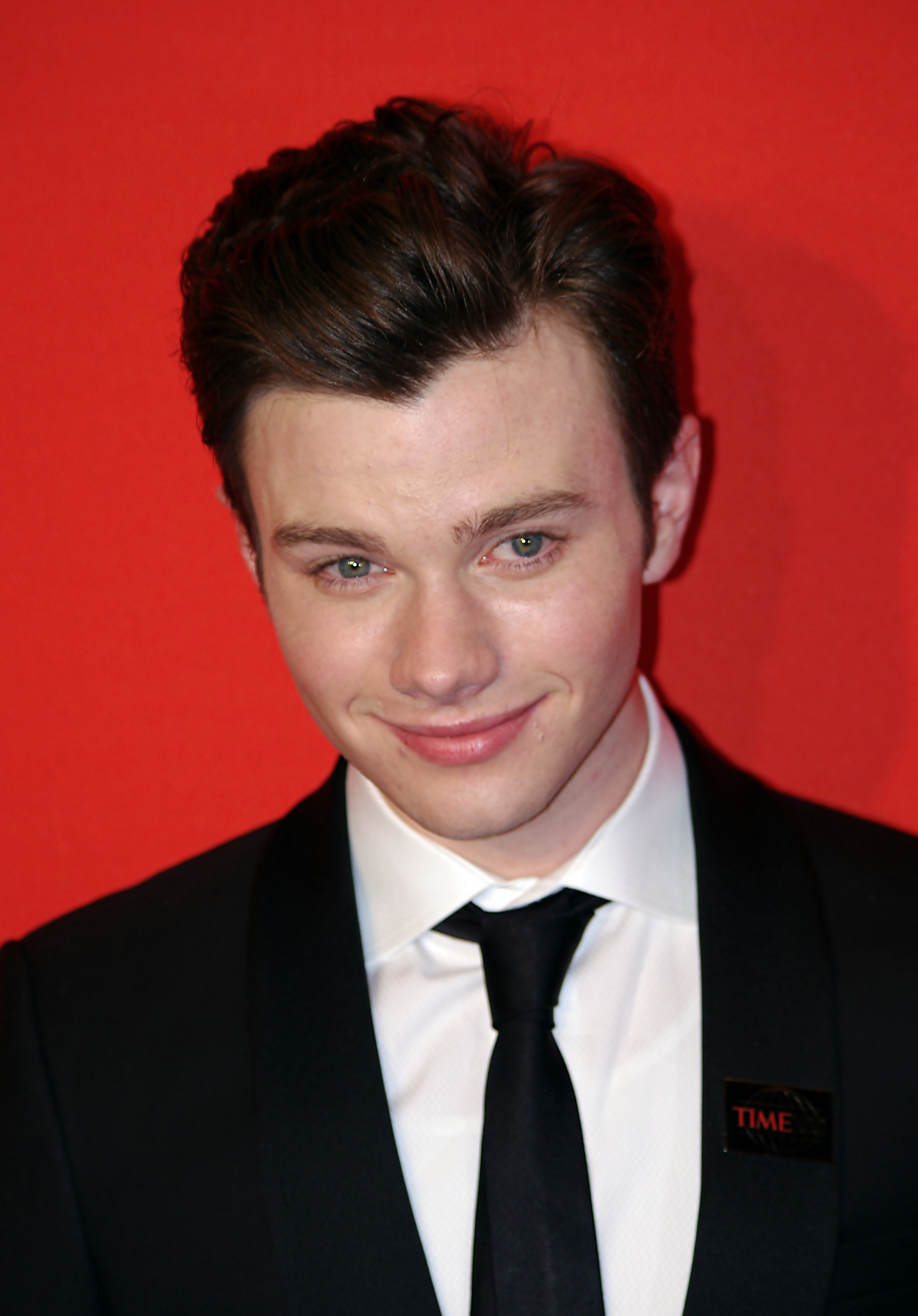
Karofsky's scenes with Kurt (Colfer, pictured) have been praised by reviewers

Michael Slezak of TVLine complimented "Max Adler's surprisingly nuanced performance" as Karofsky in "Born This Way": "The complex play of emotions in Karofsky's eyes when Santana simultaneously came out to him, threatened to out him, predicted his sad future as a closeted state senator or deacon, and offered him a quick-fix solution by pretending to be his beard, was tremendous." He added, "Adler is bringing a terrific amount of depth to Karofsky." VanDerWerff referred to Karofsky's parallel journey with Santana, who is also closeted, in her comments about the episode and the next one where the character appears, "Prom Queen". He said in his review of the latter, "the characters I'm most interested in at this point are Karofsky and Santana. They're both people trying to do the right thing, but they're also both people who are defeated by their own weakest impulses. ... They're both hemmed in by the decisions they've made and their inability to be true to themselves". Meghan Brown of The Atlantic praised Karofsky's "tearful apology to Kurt" in that episode as being "painful and poignant", and Slezak went further:

Whatever awards Chris Colfer and Max Adler get nominated for in the next six months, they earned 'em during this conversation, where Kurt wondered if maybe, just maybe, he wasn't getting bullied because kids were indifferent to him being gay, not because Karofsky was serving as his security detail. ... [Y]ou could see in Kurt's eyes the decision to start treating Karofsky not as a former tormentor, but as a terrified kid struggling with his sexual orientation. And Karofsky's break—his first true apology for bullying Kurt, and his first tentative step toward admitting the root cause of his anger—had me reaching for the Kleenex. Tell me I'm not the only one hoping Glee will keep journeying down Karofsky's difficult road toward self-acceptance.

Karofsky's reappearance and interaction with Kurt in the third-season episode "The First Time" received very positive reviews. Anthony Benigno of The Faster Times characterized the scene with Kurt and Karofsky as "subtle" and "a home run", and Entertainment Weekly's Abby West called it a "perfect little nuanced scene", while Michael Ausiello of TVLine said it was his "favorite scene of the episode". His next appearance in "Heart", again with Kurt, was described by Slezak as "electric, with Kurt tenderly giving the 'just friends' speech to Dave". Entertainment Weekly's Joseph Brannigan Lynch thought the plot of having Karofsky be Kurt's secret admirer was "vaguely stalker-ish on Karofsky's part, and contrived on the part of the show", and Robert Canning of IGN predicted that after Karofsky had been seen by his classmate, it would "just be an episode or two before Karofsky gets bullied into thinking about suicide, if not actually taking his own life". When he reviewed the next episode, "On My Way", which featured Karofsky's suicide attempt, Canning stated that his "cynicism [in the "Heart" review] was won over by a powerfully acted and directed story". He also said, "the initial locker room scene was heartbreaking" and "Max Adler's subtle facial expressions were brilliant".

VanDerWerff wrote, "The sequence in which Karofsky prepared himself for death was, unquestionably, one of the best things Glee has ever done", and Slezak called it "as devastating as anything I’ve seen on TV this year". HuffPost TV's Crystal Bell applauded Adler "for doing such an amazing job" on the suicide scene. She stated, "I would have preferred if Karofsky's story line would have been the focus of the entire episode." VanDerWerff commented that "as the show got the little details of Karofsky's desperate act just right, the whole thing took on a weight", and singled out the scene "where the teachers talked about what had happened and the smash cut to Karofsky's father screaming at him to get up" as "heart-wrenching". Bell declared that the "best scene in the entire episode is when Kurt visits Karofsky in the hospital". Lynch called it "one of the most touching scenes of this season" and "guileless, well-acted and eye-watering". Rae Votta of Billboard wrote, "As always, Kurt and Karofsky's scenes shine as the strongest in whichever episode they're featured."
