= Max Adler (actor) =

American actor (born 1986)

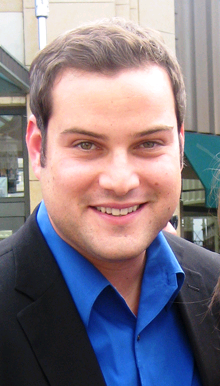
- Adler in 2011
- Born: January 17, 1986 (age 40); Queens, New York City, New York, U.S.
- Education: Horizon High School
- Occupation: Actor
- Years active: 2006–present
- Spouse: Jennifer Bronstein (m. 2015)
- Children: 1

Max Adler (born January 17, 1986) is an American actor. He is best known for his role as Dave Karofsky on the television series Glee (2009–2015).

== Early life ==
Adler was born to a Jewish family in Queens, New York, the eldest son of Lisa (née Kobrin) and Doug Adler. A year after Adler was born, his family relocated to Fountain Hills, Arizona, then to Scottsdale, Arizona. Adler attended Horizon High School, where he was a First Chair All-State show choir member. After graduating, he moved to Los Angeles to pursue a career in acting. Adler has a younger brother named Jake, born in 1992.

== Career ==
After various roles in a number of productions, Adler was cast in a recurring role in the Fox television series Glee as school jock and bully Dave Karofsky. Glee creator Ryan Murphy was impressed with his acting and wanted to write more with him. In the November 2010 episode "Never Been Kissed", written to tackle the issue of LGBT youth bullying, Karofsky is revealed to be a closeted gay teen. Adler had previously questioned his character's motivations, but was surprised by the scene in which Karofsky kisses the object of his bullying, openly gay student Kurt Hummel (Chris Colfer). He received a positive response via the social networking websites Twitter, Tumblr and Facebook, and commented that he was "glad to represent such a large group of people". He expanded on this, saying, "I've gotten so many messages from people all around the world these last couple of days thanking me because either they are Karofsky, they were Karofsky or they know a Karofsky." The character eventually gives up his bullying and makes his peace with Kurt, but he remains closeted. Adler has been praised for his performance in episode 3x14, "On My Way", during which, after his character is outed, he attempts suicide.

Adler is a resident artist with The Porters of Hellsgate theatre company in Los Angeles, appearing in three Shakespearean productions with them since 2008.

From 2014 to 2017, Adler had a recurring role as Tank, Bay's college friend on Switched at Birth.

In 2014, Adler played the role of Baker in the religious satire Believe Me.

== Activism ==
Following the Glee episode "Never Been Kissed", Adler was contacted by the It Gets Better Project, an internet based project founded by Dan Savage and his husband, Terry Miller, which aims to prevent suicide among LGBT youth. Adler recorded a heartfelt video for the project, offering words of hope and encouragement for kids and teens facing bullying due to their sexual orientation. Through playing one of the most well-known bullies on television, Adler offers viewers insight and advice, telling viewers, "most bullies are extremely insecure, and want to knock you down a peg to feel better about themselves. So, being who you are is what's awesome. It's what makes you special, interesting, fun to talk to, [and] desirable."

On November 15, 2010, Adler spoke at the Anti-Defamation League Concert Against Hate at the Kennedy Center in Washington, D.C.

Adler has also worked with the FSHD Society and MDA to help raise awareness for facioscapulohumeral muscular dystrophy (FSHD) and other hereditary muscle diseases. Adler's mother and grandmother suffered from relatively severe forms of FSHD. Because of the support that his mother gave him in becoming an actor, he feels that devoting time to raising money for MDA is a way for him to return the favor to her.

Adler, under "Team Max" is the host of the Celebrity Charity Walk 'n' Roll for FSHD to help raise funds directly for research of FSHD, one of the most prevalent muscular dystrophies. The walk is for the benefit of the FSHD Society, which is the largest grassroots organization of its kind solely dedicated to finding a treatment or cure for FSHD.

== Personal life ==
In 2012, Adler became engaged to his longtime girlfriend Jennifer Bronstein; he proposed while they were visiting Rome. They were married on December 19, 2015. On March 27, 2020, the couple welcomed their first child.

== Filmography ==
=== Film ===
Year	Title	Role	Notes
2015	Girls Rule	Himself	Short Film
2016	Winterball	Himself	
2012	Sweet Old World	Groom #3	
2012	Detention of the Dead	Jimmy	
2013	Love and Honor	Burns	
2013	23 Blast	Cameron Marshall	
2014	Saugatuck Cures	Drew Callaghan	
2014	Believe Me	Baker	
2016	The Midnight Man	Simmons	
2016	Café Society	Walt	Uncredited
2016	The Binding	David	
2016	Sully	Jimmy Stefanik	
2017	Wolf Town	Ben	
2017	Mope	Chris	
2018	Fishbowl California	Billy Kobrin	
2018	Snapshots	Joe Muller	
2019	Radioflash	Police Officer	
2020	The Trial of the Chicago 7	Officer Stan Wojohowski	
2023	Scrambled	Ron	

=== Television ===
Year	Title	Role	Notes
2006	What About Brian	Frat guy #1	Episode: "What About Denial..."
2006	Ghost Whisperer	Craig	Episode: "Giving Up the Ghost"
2007	Viva Laughlin	Chuck	Episode: "What a Whale Wants"
2009	Valley Peaks	Anderson Lord Guthrie	Web series; 3 episodes
2009	Cold Case	Rookie (1994)	Episode: "Into the Blue" (uncredited)
2009–2015	Glee	Dave Karofsky	29 episodes
2010	The Defenders	Robert Church	Episode: "Pilot"
2011	The Glee Project	Himself (guest judge/mentor)	2 episodes
2012	Last Resort	Stern	Episode: "Captain"
2013	CSI: Crime Scene Investigation	Kyle Banks	Episode: "Passed Pawns"
2014	Celebrity Ghost Stories	Himself	Episode: "Pam Grier, David Otunga, Max Adler, Golden Brooks"
2014–2017	Switched at Birth	Miles "Tank" Conroy	21 episodes
2015	Blue Bloods	Andy Fisher	Episode: "Power Players"
2015	The Big Bang Theory	Zombie	Episode: "The Intimacy Acceleration"
2016	Cooper Barrett's Guide to Surviving Life	Tommy Hench	Episode: "How to Survive Your Emotional Baggage"
2016	Rizzoli & Isles	Steve Browning	Episode: "Ocean Frank"
2017	Bones	Randy Stringer	Episode: "The Final Chapter: The Brain in the Bot"
2017	The Young and the Restless	Jesse Smith	7 episodes
2017	The Night Shift	Corporal Steven Mason	Episode: "Turbulence"
2018	Criminal Minds	Assistant Chief Jimmy Mackenzie	Episode: "Full-Tilt Boogie"
2018–2023	The Flash	Hotness / Jaco Birch	5 episodes
2018	Famous in Love	Derek Bagotti	Episode: "Reality Bites Back"
2018	Mom	Officer Terry Blankenship	Episode: "Phone Confetti and a Wee Dingle"
2018	Into the Dark	Officer Freer	Episode: "The Body"
2019	Shameless	Eric	Episode: "The Apple Doesn't Fall Far From the Alibi"
2019	9-1-1	Sam	Episode: "Ocean's 9-1-1"
2019	The Filth	Jake Douglas	Episode: "Filthy Bro Day"
2020	The Rookie	Cisco Fane	Episode: "The Hunt"
2021	NCIS	Luke Stana	Episode: "Watchdog"
2021	All Rise	Deputy Sheriff Jacobs	Episode: "Forgive Us Our Trespasses"
2022	The Guardians of Justice	Samson Steel	7 episodes
2026	The Pitt	Ralph	Episode: "5:00 P.M."
