= The Hurt Locker, Part Two =

- Glee episode
- Rachel and Kitty hack into Sue Sylvester's computer
- Episode no.: Season 6 Episode 5
- Directed by: Barbara Brown
- Written by: Ian Brennan
- Production code: 6ARC05
- Original air date: January 30, 2015

Guest appearances
- Michael Hitchcock as Dalton Rumba; Becca Tobin as Kitty Wilde; Max George as Clint; Harry Hamlin as Walter; Lauren Potter as Becky Jackson; Marshall Williams as Spencer Porter; Samantha Marie Ware as Jane Hayward; Noah Guthrie as Roderick; Billy Lewis Jr. as Mason McCarthy; Laura Dreyfuss as Madison McCarthy

Episode chronology
← Previous "The Hurt Locker, Part One"	Next → "What the World Needs Now"
- Glee season 6

"The Hurt Locker, Part Two" is the fifth episode of the sixth season of the American musical television series Glee, and the 113th overall. The episode was written by series co-creator Ian Brennan, directed by Barbara Brown, and first aired on January 30, 2015 on Fox in the United States. It is the second part of a two-part episode which began on January 23, 2015 with the episode "The Hurt Locker, Part One".

The episode takes place as Principal Sue Sylvester continues an event between New Directions and rival show choir groups Vocal Adrenaline and the Warblers. Sue continues to attempt to reconcile Kurt Hummel and Blaine Anderson and hypnotizes Sam Evans to continue his false relationship with Rachel Berry. Meanwhile, Rachel desperately searches for new members for New Directions in an attempt to win the event.

== Plot ==
As Vocal Adrenaline completes their last song, Principal Sue Sylvester (Jane Lynch) announces that she is the sole judge for this invitational, and that she is extending it over three days in order to give Kurt Hummel (Chris Colfer) and Rachel Berry (Lea Michele) more time to find additional members, as New Directions does not have the required twelve members for official show choir competitions. Rachel is upset with Will Schuester (Matthew Morrison) because he broke their agreement to have Vocal Adrenaline perform poorly. Kurt suggests that Rachel attempt to recruit former New Directions member Kitty Wilde (Becca Tobin) even though she has openly declined rejoining the group. Kurt continues to date Walter (Harry Hamlin) while Sue interrupts them as a waitress attempting to break them up. Sue tells Becky Jackson (Lauren Potter) that she plans on trapping Kurt and former fiance Blaine Anderson (Darren Criss) in a small enclosed space to force them to reconcile. Rachel tries to persuade Kitty to rejoin New Directions but she is heartbroken over her previous memories there. As the Warblers perform, Kurt and Blaine get trapped in a fake elevator.

Sue re-hypnotizes Sam Evans (Chord Overstreet) to convince Rachel to use horrible songs for their performance. The next day, Kurt and Blaine are still missing, and Sam (under hypnosis) gives the songs to Rachel while professing his love for her. Rachel snaps her fingers to break his trance, and asks Sam to search for Kurt and try to find some new singers. In the elevator, Kurt and Blaine are met by a doll resembling Sue and Billy the Puppet who reveals that Kurt and Blaine must kiss passionately in order to escape. Kitty has a change of heart, agrees to rejoin New Directions, and helps Rachel hack into Sue's computer to access a secret music playlist that Sue is emotionally attached to. Sam meets up with Spencer Porter (Marshall Williams) and attempts to convince him to join New Directions. After a discussion with policeman and former coach of the Haverbrook Deaf Choir Dalton Rumba (Michael Hitchcock), Rachel convinces Jane Hayward (Samantha Marie Ware), Roderick (Noah Guthrie), Mason McCarthy (Billy Lewis Jr.) and Madison McCarthy (Laura Dreyfuss) to trust her last-minute change of songs, as Spencer finally agrees to join New Directions. Rachel and Will apologize to each other as they realize Sue was behind the attempts to break them apart.

New Directions begins their performance as Kurt and Blaine kiss passionately to allow them to be freed. The songs touch Sue's emotions to the point where she announces New Directions as the winner of the invitational, with Vocal Adrenaline in second place, and the Warblers in third place. Vocal Adrenaline's leader Clint (Max George) blames Will for their losing and vows to take action. Sue tells Will that the songs also purged her anger for Will. Kurt and Blaine confront Sue over the kidnapping and state that it only helped them get over any resentment they had over their breakup. Back in her storage unit, Sue reveals to Becky that these events were all part of her ongoing plan, as New Directions celebrate their victory.

== Production ==
Returning recurring characters that appear in the episode include Michael Hitchcock as Dalton Rumba, Becca Tobin as Kitty Wilde, Max George as Clint, Harry Hamlin as Walter, Lauren Potter as Becky Jackson, Marshall Williams as Spencer Porter, Samantha Marie Ware as Jane Hayward, Noah Guthrie as Roderick, Billy Lewis Jr. as Mason McCarthy, and Laura Dreyfuss as Madison McCarthy. Also in this episode, Kitty and Spencer are admitted as members of New Directions.

The episode features five musical cover versions. "My Sharona" by The Knack and "You Spin Me Round (Like a Record)" by Dead or Alive are sung by the Warblers. "It Must Have Been Love" by Roxette is sung by Tobin and Williams with New Directions. "Father Figure" by George Michael is sung by Guthrie with New Directions. "All Out of Love" by Air Supply is sung by Lewis Jr. and Dreyfuss with New Directions. Accompanying the music from this episode, the EP Glee: The Music, The Hurt Locker, Part Two was released on January 30, 2015.

== Reception ==
=== Ratings ===
The episode was watched by 1.85 million viewers and received a 0.7 rating/2 share in the adult 18-49 demographic.

=== Critical response ===
Lauren Hoffman from Vulture said about this final season that "If Glee looks like #YOLO-style television written by a bunch of people with nothing to lose, that's because, at this point, it absolutely is." Christopher Rogers from Hollywood Life believed the kiss between Kurt and Blaine was more than just a fake kiss, describing it as "a hot makeout session." The A.V. Club's Brandon Nowalk panned the episode, stating that the episode "ultimately just does whatever the fuck it wants." Miranda Wicker from TV Fanatic had a mixed review of the episode, and said "I've basically given up on this show even kind of being grounded in reality after this ridiculous Sue-Loves-Klaine story. And yet I still find myself rooting for a ragtag bunch of underdogs."
