= The Hurt Locker, Part One =

- Glee episode
- Sue Sylvester stands in front of her "hurt locker"
- Episode no.: Season 6 Episode 4
- Directed by: Ian Brennan
- Written by: Ian Brennan
- Production code: 6ARC04
- Original air date: January 23, 2015

Guest appearances
- Iqbal Theba as Principal Figgins / Abigail Figgins-Gunderson; Max Adler as Dave Karofsky; Max George as Clint; Harry Hamlin as Walter; Lauren Potter as Becky Jackson; Trilby Glover as the Carmel High secretary; Samantha Marie Ware as Jane Hayward; Noah Guthrie as Roderick; Billy Lewis Jr. as Mason McCarthy; Laura Dreyfuss as Madison McCarthy

Episode chronology
← Previous "Jagged Little Tapestry"	Next → "The Hurt Locker, Part Two"
- Glee season 6

"The Hurt Locker, Part One" is the fourth episode of the sixth season of the American musical television series Glee, and the 112th overall. The episode was written and directed by series co-creator Ian Brennan, and first aired on January 23, 2015 on Fox in the United States. It is the first part of a two-part episode which concluded on January 30, 2015 with the episode "The Hurt Locker, Part Two".

The episode takes place as Principal Sue Sylvester organizes an event between New Directions and rival show choir groups Vocal Adrenaline and the Warblers. Sue has ulterior motives though, and hypnotizes Sam Evans to carry out her plans which includes creating a false relationship between Sam and Rachel Berry, and creating discord for her old rival Will Schuester.

== Plot ==
Principal Sue Sylvester (Jane Lynch) invites Will Schuester (Matthew Morrison), now coach of Vocal Adrenaline, back to McKinley High to end the dispute between them, but drops the idea when Will leaves behind a plastic fork during lunch (Sue finds this offending). Sue invites Becky Jackson (Lauren Potter) to a storage locker she has named her "hurt locker" where it is revealed that she has been secretly encouraging the relationship between Kurt Hummel (Chris Colfer) and his former fiance Blaine Anderson (Darren Criss), and that she is working towards getting them back together. Sue tells Kurt that she has organized an invitational of other show choirs in order to sabotage New Directions. As Rachel Berry (Lea Michele) and Will discuss the event, Rachel is concerned that it will cause her fledgeling group to lose confidence and implies that Will should sabotage his group in order to help her, while their conversation is being secretly recorded by Sue. Sue then quickly hypnotizes Sam Evans (Chord Overstreet) with keywords to make him feel love towards Rachel, kiss her, then wake up and not remember anything. Blaine Anderson (Darren Criss) tells Rachel and Kurt Hummel (Chris Colfer) that the Warblers will not go easy on them, but is called away when his new boyfriend Dave Karofsky (Max Adler) discovers a live bear cub in their apartment. Rachel and Sam have dinner together as Rachel states a keyword from Sam's hypnosis, and he begins to flatter her.

Kurt blames Sue for putting the bear in the apartment which she admits to. Blaine gives piano lessons to Sam and Rachel but it is broken up by Sue who implants another keyword to Sam. Blaine and Dave go out to dinner and run into multiple ex-boyfriends of Dave, all of whom are larger, burly gay men (a.k.a. bears). Sue comes in and discloses that she has set this up, then shows them a genealogy tree which shows that Blaine and Dave are third cousins. Sue visits Carmel High, home of Vocal Adrenaline, and meets the principal Abigail Figgins-Gunderson (Iqbal Theba), who is the sister of Principal Figgins, and Sue shows her the video of Will and Rachel. Rachel and Kurt give a pep talk to New Directions members Jane Hayward (Samantha Marie Ware), Roderick (Noah Guthrie), Mason McCarthy (Billy Lewis Jr.) and Madison McCarthy (Laura Dreyfuss) about the invitational, and they all realize that their chances are dim since they do not even have the proper number of members for a true show choir. Will confronts Sue about her sabotage to which she admits while lavishly telling Will about her disdain for him. Will vows to ensure New Directions will continue after Sue is gone.

Kurt and Blaine discuss Sue's attempts to break up Blaine and Dave, as Kurt states he has a date with a new guy later, which causes Blaine to act awkwardly. Rachel and Sam continue their piano lessons while flirting with each other which leads to them kissing. The next day, Sam does not remember any of their actions. Sue then re-hypnotizes Sam to both continue his charade and also steal Will's mail. Kurt goes on his date and meets Walter (Harry Hamlin), a much older man who has only recently come out as gay and had a former wife and kids, and after much awkwardness they agree to start off as friends. Will encounters Sam attempting to steal his mail, as Sam, under hypnosis, tells Will that Rachel told him to do so. Angered at this, Will tells Vocal Adrenaline, led by Clint (Max George), to go all out for the invitational, but they are unaccepting of his teaching style. Vocal Adrenaline performs well and intimidates Kurt, Rachel, and the rest of New Directions and the Warblers, while Sue watches with pride.

== Production ==
Returning recurring characters that appear in the episode include Iqbal Theba as both Principal Figgins and his twin sister Abigail Figgins-Gunderson, Max Adler as Dave Karofsky, Max George as Clint, Lauren Potter as Becky Jackson, Samantha Marie Ware as Jane Hayward, Noah Guthrie as Roderick, Billy Lewis Jr. as Mason McCarthy, and Laura Dreyfuss as Madison McCarthy. Harry Hamlin appears as Walter, the date of Kurt, and Trilby Glover appears as an unnamed secretary for Abigail.

The episode features four musical cover versions. "Bitch" by Meredith Brooks is performed by Lynch. "A Thousand Miles" by Vanessa Carlton is performed by Michele and Overstreet. "Rock Lobster" by The B-52's and "Whip It" by Devo are both performed by George with the members of Vocal Adrenaline. Accompanying the music from this episode, the EP Glee: The Music, The Hurt Locker, Part One was released on January 23, 2015.

== Reception ==
=== Ratings ===
The episode was watched by 1.82 million viewers and received a 0.7 rating/2 share in the adult 18-49 demographic.

=== Critical response ===
Lauren Hoffman from Vulture said that the episode "was a return to those darkly hilarious/hilariously dark roots as Glee continues to barrel through what's shaping up to be a pretty epic victory lap." Christopher Rogers from Hollywood Life thought the episode "was all over the place." The A.V. Club's Brandon Nowalk panned the episode, stating "It makes no sense, but some of those nonsensical things are kind of funny." Miranda Wicker from TV Fanatic also panned the episode, and said the episode "has just definitively proven that Glee has given up on itself and pretty much isn't even trying."
