= David Aron Damane =

American film and television actor

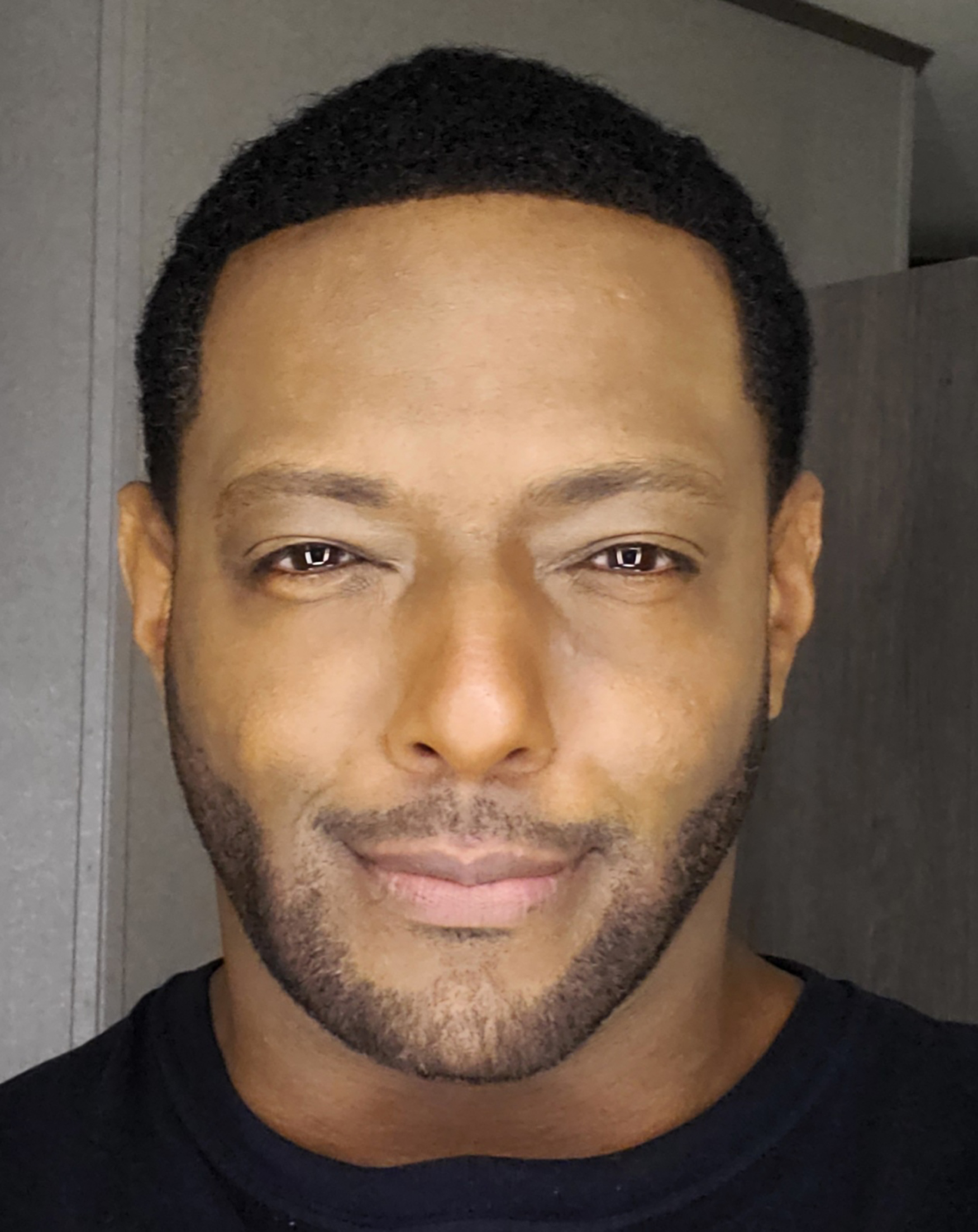
- Occupations: Actor, writer
- Years active: 1994–present
- Known for: Eddie McKay in Jett; Maurice Owens in Chicago P.D. Leo Abbott in Dynasty
- Awards: Drama Desk Award nomination, Outstanding Actor in a Musical; AUDELCO Award nomination, Featured Actor in a Musical; Ovation Award winner, Best Supporting Actor in a Touring Musical
- Website: DavidAronDamane.com

David Aron Damane is an American actor and writer. He made his television debut on Cosby, followed by roles on Law & Order, Law & Order: Special Victims Unit, Chicago P.D., Jett, and Dynasty. In 2020, he was nominated for the Drama Desk Award for Outstanding Actor in a Musical for his portrayal of J.J. Brown in Transport Group's Off-Broadway production of The Unsinkable Molly Brown.

== Career ==
Damane made his television debut in 1996 as Skip on Cosby. In 1997, he made his Broadway debut in The Life. He portrayed Chingachgook in the Goodspeed Opera House musical Glimmerglass in 1999. In 2000, he joined the cast of Broadway's Riverdance as Principal Soloist, and in 2001 played Isaiah in the Off-Broadway play Living in the Wind. Later that year, Damane played James Wilson on Law & Order.

In 2002, Mr. Damane portrayed Jake in New York City Opera's Porgy and Bess, which was also televised on PBS's Live from Lincoln Center. In 2003, he returned to Broadway in the revival of the musical Big River, produced by Roundabout Theatre Company and Deaf West Theatre. The following year, he played DuShawn McGovern on Law & Order: Special Victims Unit. In 2005, he joined the national tour of Big River, playing Jim for the remainder of its run, and won the 2005 Ovation Award for Best Supporting Actor in a Touring Musical. He joined the first national tour of the musical The Color Purple in 2009. in 2011 he played Joe in Goodspeed Opera House's Show Boat. He returned to Broadway in 2012 as George in the play Don't Dress for Dinner, and as the General in The Book of Mormon. Later that year, he originated the role of the General in the Chicago company of the show, until leaving the company in 2016. In 2013, He began playing Maurice Owens on Chicago P.D.

He returned to the New York stage in 2018 as Husky Miller in Classic Stage Company's Carmen Jones, and received an AUDELCO Award nomination for Featured Actor in a Musical. In 2019 he was seen as Eddie McKay on the Cinemax series Jett. He earned a 2020 Drama Desk Award nomination for Outstanding Actor in a Musical for his portrayal of J.J. Brown in Transport Group's The Unsinkable Molly Brown.

In 2021, David played Leo Abbott on The CW's Dynasty. He returned to the New York stage in the fall of 2021 with the new musical, A Turtle on a Fence Post.

On August 19, 2025, it was announced that Mr. Damane will be returning to Broadway in the new musical, The Queen of Versailles

=== Film and television ===
Year	Title	Role	Notes
1996	Cosby	Skip	Episode: "Tempus Lucas"
2001	Law and Order	James Wilson	Episode: "3 Dawg Night"
2002	Live From Lincoln Center	Jake	Porgy and Bess
2004	Law and Order: Special Victims Unit	DuShawn McGovern	Episode: "Lowdown"
2009	America	Bobby Crisp	
2014	Chicago P.D.	Maurice Owens	Recurring
2018	Instinct	Conductor Johnson	Episode: "I Heart New York"
2019	Jett	Eddie McKay	Recurring
2021	Dynasty	Leo Abbott	Recurring

=== Theatre ===
Year	Title	Role	Notes
1997	Tommy	Specialist	North Shore Music Theatre
1997	Big River	Jim u/s	Paper Mill Playhouse
1997 - 1998	The Life	Memphis, Memphis u/s, Silky u/s	Broadway, The Ethel Barrymore Theatre
1998	Where's Charley?	Simon	Kennedy Center
1999	Glimmerglass	Chingachgook	Goodspeed's Norma Terris Theatre
2000	Riverdance	Principal Soloist	National Tour, Lagan company
2000 - 2001	Riverdance	Principal Soloist	Broadway, Gershwin Theatre
2001	Living in the Wind	Isaiah	Off-Broadway, American Place Theatre
2001	To Kill A Mockingbird	Tom Robinson	Ford's Theatre
2002	Porgy and Bess	Jake	New York City Opera
2003	Big River	Jim u's	Broadway, American Airlines Theatre
2005	Big River	Jim	National Tour; Ovation Award winner, Best Supporting Actor in a Touring Musical.
2009-2010	The Color Purple	Pa, Mister u/s, Ol' Mister u/s	National Tour
2011	Reunion	Hannibal Drumwright	Meadow Brook Theatre
2011	Big River	Jim	PlayMakers Repertory Company
2011	Show Boat	Joe	Goodspeed Opera House
2011	The Parchman Hour	Pee Wee	PlayMakers Repertory Company
2012	Don't Dress for Dinner	George	Broadway, American Airlines Theatre
2012	The Book of Mormon	The General	Broadway, Eugene O'Neill Theatre
2012 - 2016	The Book of Mormon	The General	Chicago company - 2nd National Tour
2018	Carmen Jones	Husky Miller	Off-Broadway, Classic Stage Company; AUDELCO Award nomination, Featured Actor in a Musical.
2019	Big River	Jim	Rubicon Theatre Company
2020	The Unsinkable Molly Brown	J.J. Brown	Off-Broadway, Transport Group; Drama Desk Award nomination, Outstanding Actor in a Musical.
2021	A Turtle on a Fence Post	Z	Off-Broadway
2022	Kinky Boots	Don	Pittsburgh CLO
2025	The Queen of Versailles	Ray	Broadway, St. James Theatre

=== Voice ===
Year	Title	Role	Notes
2014	Watch Dogs	Citizens	Video Game
2018	World of Warcraft: Battle for Azeroth	Zandalari Exile	Video Game
