= The Church of Jesus Christ of Latter-day Saints in Uganda =

- Area: Africa Central
- Members: 26,304 (2025)
- Stakes: 4
- Districts: 4
- Wards: 26
- Branches: 36
- Total congregations: 62
- Missions: 1
- FamilySearch Centers: 17

The Church of Jesus Christ of Latter-day Saints in Uganda refers to the Church of Jesus Christ of Latter-day Saints (LDS Church) and its members in Uganda. A branch was created in Kampala in 1991, and by year-end 1991, there were 99 members in Uganda. In 2025, there were 26,304 members in over 62 congregations.

== History ==
Membership in Uganda
Year	Membership
1991	99
1993*	800
1995*	1,300
1999	2,375
2004	3,788
2009	6,919
2014	13,248
2019	17,887
2024	25,210
2025	26,304
*Membership was published as a rounded number.

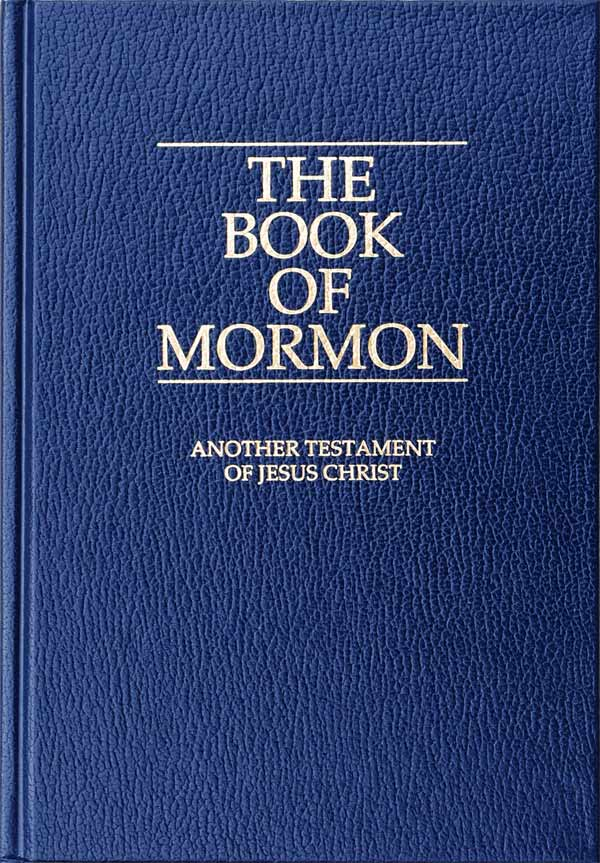
English

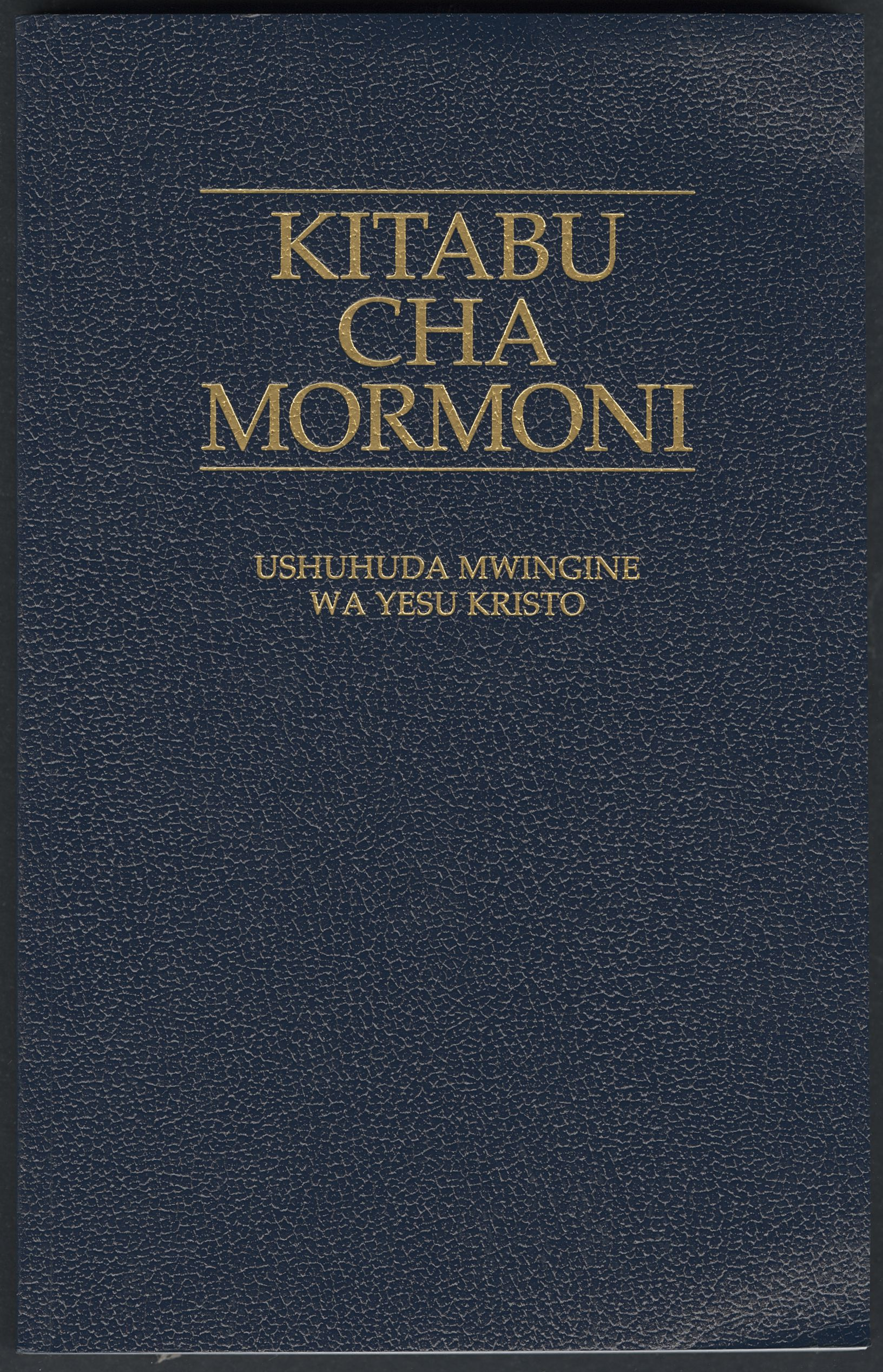
Swahili

The Book of Mormon in the official languages of Uganda.

The first Ugandan to join the LDS Church was Charles Osinde, who was baptized in Scotland and returned to Uganda.

The LDS Church was profiled in the Broadway musical The Book of Mormon that premiered in 2011. The story follows two missionaries in Uganda.

In 2012, The New York Times profiled an LDS Church missionary, Jared Dangerfield, as he served in Uganda, "Each day he rises with the African sun to say his prayers before venturing into the urban wilderness of Kampala, Uganda, a churning kaleidoscope of motorcycles, street urchins, vegetable carts and pterodactyl-like storks that circle office towers and lampposts. They orbit above him as he makes his way up and down the muddy hills of the capital city, careful to keep his black pants and white shirt clean, scanning faces in search of those who will listen to him speak of his faith. His Mormon faith."

== Stakes and Districts ==
As of July 2026, the following stakes and districts were located in Uganda.

Stake	Organized	Mission
Busia Uganda District	17 Nov 2024	Uganda Kampala East
Gulu Uganda Stake	7 Dec 2025	Uganda Kampala West
Jinja Uganda East Stake	29 Nov 2015	Uganda Kampala East
Jinja Uganda West Stake	2 Aug 2026	Uganda Kampala East
Kampala Uganda North Stake	17 Jan 2010	Uganda Kampala East
Kampala Uganda South Stake	22 Jan 2017	Uganda Kampala West
Lira Uganda District	12 Jan 2025	Uganda Kampala East
Masaka Uganda District	6 Jan 2019	Uganda Kampala West
Mbale Uganda District	17 Nov 2024	Uganda Kampala East

Branches not part of a stake or district include:

- Bukomero Branch
- Buwenge Branch
- Kibale Branch
- Mbarara Branch
- Soroti Branch
- Uganda Kampala East Dispersed Members Unit
- Uganda Kampala West Dispersed Members Unit

The Uganda Kampala Dispersed Members Unit serves families and individuals in Uganda and South Sudan that are not in proximity of a meetinghouse.

== Mission ==
The Uganda Kampala Mission was created in 2005 as a division of the Kenya Nairobi Mission. In 2012, the mission split again creating the Rwanda Kigali Mission. As of November 2025, the Uganda Kampala Mission remains the only mission of the LDS Church in Uganda and also encompasses South Sudan. In October 2025, the LDS Church announced the Uganda Kampala Mission will be divided to create the Uganda Kampala East Mission in July 2026.

Mission	Organized
Uganda Kampala East	1 July 2026
Uganda Kampala West	1 July 2005

=== South Sudan ===
The LDS Church has reported no official church membership and congregational figures. Member groups in Juba and Akobo operated starting in 2009 but was discontinued during a civil war in the mid 2010s. A branch in Juba started appearing on the LDS Church's website in their meetinghouse locator in 2025. The rest of South Sudan is included in the Uganda Kampala West Dispersed Members Unit which serves individuals and families not in proximity to a meetinghouse.

== Temples ==
Uganda is currently in the Johannesburg South Africa Temple district. On April 2, 2017, the Nairobi Kenya Temple was announced by Church President Thomas S. Monson.

On October 6, 2024, President Russell M. Nelson announced that a temple will be built in the capital city of Kampala.

361. Kampala Uganda Temple (Announced); Official website; News & images	
Location: Announced:	Kampala, Uganda; 6 October 2024 by Russell M. Nelson

== See also ==
- Religion in Uganda
