= Glee season 6 =

2015 season of American musical comedy drama

Glee
- Season 6
- Promotional poster and home media cover art
- Starring: Chris Colfer; Darren Criss; Dot-Marie Jones; Jane Lynch; Kevin McHale; Lea Michele; Matthew Morrison; Chord Overstreet; Amber Riley
- No. of episodes: 13

Release
- Original network: Fox
- Original release: January 9 – March 20, 2015

Season chronology
- ← Previous; Season 5

The sixth and final season of the Fox musical comedy-drama television series Glee was commissioned on April 19, 2013, along with the fifth season, as part of a two-season renewal deal for the show on the Fox network. Consisting of 13 episodes, the season premiered on January 9, 2015, with its first two episodes, and concluded on March 20 with its last two episodes.

The series features the New Directions glee club at the fictional William McKinley High School (WMHS) in the town of Lima, Ohio, and some of the graduates of McKinley. The season focuses on the former glee club member, Rachel Berry, who returns to McKinley after her TV pilot bombs to rebuild the disbanded glee club. The central characters are the former glee club director Will Schuester (Matthew Morrison), school principal Sue Sylvester (Jane Lynch), and Glee club graduates Rachel Berry (Lea Michele), Kurt Hummel (Chris Colfer), Blaine Anderson (Darren Criss), Artie Abrams (Kevin McHale), and Sam Evans (Chord Overstreet). Amber Riley returns to the main cast as Mercedes Jones and Dot-Marie Jones, who portrays Shannon Beiste, the school's football coach, was promoted to the main cast after four years as a recurring character. Jenna Ushkowitz, Naya Rivera, Becca Tobin, Jacob Artist, Blake Jenner, and Alex Newell who have portrayed, respectively, Tina Cohen-Chang, Santana Lopez, Kitty Wilde, Jake Puckerman, Ryder Lynn, and Wade "Unique" Adams, were demoted from the main cast this season, with Ushkowitz, Rivera, and Tobin recurring, and Newell appearing in one episode before joining Artist and Jenner for a brief appearance in the finale. Melissa Benoist as Marley Rose did not return for the final season.

The season was nominated for one Emmy Award for Outstanding Original Music and Lyrics.

== Production ==
On April 19, 2013, Fox renewed Glee for a fifth and a sixth season, as part of a two-season renewal deal for the show. Ryan Murphy subsequently announced that season six would be the series' final season, that it wouldn't be New York-centric like the end of the fifth season, that there will be a time jump between the season five finale and the season six premiere, and that during the final season the show would revisit the younger McKinley High students who did not graduate in the fifth season. Season six premiered on January 9, 2015, as part of the 2014–15 television season. The 13 episodes were broadcast consecutively on Fridays at 9:00 p.m. (ET), with the beginning and ending double episodes starting an hour earlier.

Executive Music Producer Adam Anders began working on the music for the season on July 16, 2014, and on August 25 his brother Alex Anders was in the studio with Darren Criss doing the show's first cast member recording session of the season.

The season's first day of filming was September 3, 2014, which was revealed that day by co-executive producer Michael Hitchcock with a "Back to school" tweet accompanied by a photo of a first-episode call sheet; Lea Michele posted a picture of herself from the set that same day. Filming concluded on February 21, 2015.

The final season follows former New Directions lead singer and Broadway star Rachel Berry (Michele) as she returns to Lima to relaunch the New Directions. The sixth season included the 700th song performance on the show, which took place in the sixth episode. On December 6, 2014, the EPs for the first two episodes of the season were posted on Amazon over a month before their scheduled release, including the episodes' titles "Loser Like Me" and "Homecoming". "Loser Like Me" included the songs "Uninvited", "Suddenly Seymour", "Sing", "Dance the Night Away" and "Let It Go". "Homecoming" included the songs "Take On Me", "Tightrope", "Mustang Sally", "Home" and "Problem". The EP for the third episode was posted on December 13, 2014, including the episode title "Jagged Little Tapestry". The episode included the songs "It's Too Late", "So Far Away", and three mash-ups: "Hand In My Pocket / I Feel the Earth Move", "Will You Love Me Tomorrow / Head Over Feet", and "You Learn / You've Got a Friend".

== Episodes ==
No. overall	No. in season	Title	Directed by	Written by	Original release date	Prod. code	US viewers (millions)
109	1	"Loser Like Me"	Bradley Buecker	Ryan Murphy & Brad Falchuk & Ian Brennan	January 9, 2015	6ARC01	2.34
Rachel's TV show is canceled after a single episode, so she returns to Lima only to find out that her fathers are getting a divorce. When she finds out that Sue has stripped McKinley of all arts, Rachel convinces the Lima Superintendent to reinstate New Directions, but he insists that she lead it. Blaine has returned to Lima and is the coach of the Warblers, having flunked out of NYADA after Kurt severed their engagement. Will is now coaching rival Vocal Adrenaline, and Sam is the assistant coach for the McKinley football team. Kurt misses Blaine and decides to do his NYADA third-year project in Lima helping Rachel with New Directions, but discovers that Blaine has moved on and is dating Dave Karofsky.
110	2	"Homecoming"	Bradley Buecker	Ryan Murphy	January 9, 2015	6ARC02	2.34
As Rachel searches for new talent, she brings in McKinley alum Mercedes, Artie, Puck, Quinn, Santana, Brittany, and Tina, who agree to help Rachel and Kurt recruit for the resurrected glee club. They find talent from the likes of a soulful loner named Roderick and cheerleading twins Mason and Madison McCarthy. Kurt tries to convince gay football player Spencer to join, but he turns the offer down. Blaine faces a problem when Jane Hayward, the first female student admitted to Dalton Academy, wants to join the all-male Warblers. Despite a rousing audition, she is denied a spot in the choir. Blaine vows to fight for Jane's admittance, but is infuriated when she instead transfers to McKinley and joins New Directions.
111	3	"Jagged Little Tapestry"	Paul McCrane	Brad Falchuk	January 16, 2015	6ARC03	1.98
Rachel and Kurt introduce their first assignment for the newly-formed New Directions and the remaining alumni: to perform mash-ups of songs from Carole King's Tapestry and Alanis Morissette's Jagged Little Pill. Santana decides to propose to Brittany, which causes Kurt—still regretting his breakup with Blaine—to vocally object and raise Santana's ire. Kurt's bitterness also causes tension with Rachel, whose optimistic leadership is at odds with Kurt's realistic expectations for the new members, and the two friends clash. Meanwhile, Becky returns to McKinley and asks Quinn and Tina to help convince her new boyfriend Darrell that she was in glee club after trying to impress him with a number of lies. Coach Beiste has been diagnosed with gender dysphoria, and tells Sam and Sue of her imminent transition and surgery.
112	4	"The Hurt Locker, Part One"	Ian Brennan	Ian Brennan	January 23, 2015	6ARC04	1.82
Sue organizes an invitational for New Directions, Vocal Adrenaline and the Warblers, despite the fact that Rachel and Kurt's group is still small and unprepared. Sue also works to take down Will for constantly annoying her, as well as to reunite Kurt and Blaine—a relationship that she has secretly been shipping. In order to accomplish her goals, she hypnotizes Sam and instructs him to make amorous advances toward Rachel and then have him forget, allowing him to break her heart so that she becomes distracted from her duties as choir director. She also has a hypnotized Sam pit Will against Rachel by spreading lies about a fictional animosity that Rachel has toward him. Finally, she investigates the genealogies of Blaine and Karofsky and informs them that they're third cousins, while also having Blaine learn that Karofsky's previous boyfriends were all bears. Meanwhile, Kurt meets an online date named Walter, only to learn that he is a man in his 50s who only recently came out. The episode ends with Vocal Adrenaline's invitational set.
113	5	"The Hurt Locker, Part Two"	Barbara Brown	Ian Brennan	January 30, 2015	6ARC05	1.85
After Vocal Adrenaline perform, Sue announces that she is extending the invitational two more days in order to give New Directions more time to prepare. Desperate for more members, Rachel asks Kitty Wilde to rejoin; while initially hesitant due to the heartbreak caused by the original group's disbanding, she agrees and helps Rachel create a new setlist using some of Sue's favorite songs. Sam also helps in the recruitment process by convincing Spencer to join. Meanwhile, Sue traps Blaine and Kurt in an ersatz elevator before the Warblers perform and, via a mechanized robot, tells them that they must passionately kiss if they want to leave; they do, after spending over a day in confinement. They escape just as New Directions perform and after Rachel and Will make amends. Despite her attempts to sabotage their chances, Sue begrudgingly names the New Directions as winners of the invitational; Vocal Adrenaline are the runners-up, which angers Clint, the lead singer. Kurt and Blaine confront Sue over their captivity and tell her that the kiss has merely reaffirmed their decision to remain friends. Sue appears to concede, but later tells Becky that that was her plan all along.
114	6	"What the World Needs Now"	Barbara Brown	Michael Hitchcock	February 6, 2015	6ARC06	1.58
Rachel and Sam continue to be indecisive about their relationship as the glee club celebrates the music of Burt Bacharach. Mercedes is invited back to mentor them before Sectionals. Mercedes tries to lure Rachel back to Broadway by scheduling her to audition for an original musical; Rachel, still nursing her wounds after abandoning Funny Girl for her failed TV show, does not feel confident that she is ready. With encouragement from her friends, however, she travels to New York and attends her audition. Mercedes also encourages Sam to pursue Rachel, which he does. Meanwhile, Santana and Brittany begin planning for their wedding day. Brittany tells her parents about her engagement (although not before being told that Stephen Hawking is her real father) and hires Artie as the wedding planner. She also gets in touch with Santana's estranged grandmother, Alma, and tries to reconcile the two. Her plan fails when Alma cannot overcome her homophobic prejudices. Nevertheless, the pair are comforted by the support of their friends, who toast their love in song.
115	7	"Transitioning"	Dante Di Loreto	Matthew Hodgson	February 13, 2015	6ARC07	1.81
Will is enjoying the material benefits of coaching Vocal Adrenaline, but cannot connect emotionally with the job. When Clint and the other members egg Rachel and Blaine, Will puts his foot down and invites Unique to help him teach a lesson on tolerance. This falls on deaf ears, as the students later vandalize newly-transgender Sheldon Beiste's car in the hopes of distracting New Directions so that they will have to spend time learning about tolerance instead of rehearsing for Sectionals. Meanwhile, Rachel's childhood home is finally sold, and to help ease her transition, Sam organizes a farewell party for the house in her basement. There, after singing a duet that Kurt surreptitiously prearranged, Blaine kisses his former fiancé, and the act leads to his breakup with Karofsky. However, when he is about to break the news to Kurt, he finds him, Walter, Rachel and Sam about to go out on a double date. After getting helpful advice from his Emma, Will tricks Vocal Adrenaline into thinking they will pull a prank on New Directions, when in reality he has them hear Unique and a transgender choir serenade Sheldon to make his transition easier. He then decides to quit and, at the behest of Rachel and Kurt, becomes a consultant for New Directions.
116	8	"A Wedding"	Bradley Buecker	Ross Maxwell	February 20, 2015	6ARC08	1.86
Santana and Brittany decide to get married in the Indiana barn where Brittany was born, proving convenient as same sex marriage is legal in Indiana. Before the ceremony, Brittany agrees to have Burt Hummel officiate the ceremony, while Santana tells Sue that she is not invited. While choosing wedding dresses, Santana goes against tradition and sees Brittany in her chosen dress, sending the latter into a superstitious tailspin. On the day of the ceremony, Sue arrives with Alma, who finally gives her blessing to the couple; this act redeems Sue in Santana's eyes, and she is allowed to stay for the wedding. Sue and Brittany also convince Kurt and Blaine to get married that same day. After the couples tie the knot, Tina tries to propose to Mike, who gently turns her down as he thinks she is caught up in the two weddings that just happened. While lunching together back at McKinley, Tina and Artie make a pact and agree to marry each other if they are still single by 30. Sue gives the newlywed couples a parting gift, sending Kurt and Blaine on a weekend honeymoon trip to Provincetown, Massachusetts, and Santana and Brittany on a month-long getaway to the Bahamas.
117	9	"Child Star"	Michael Hitchcock	Ned Martel	February 27, 2015	6ARC10	1.69
In the hope of securing the prestigious Principal of the Year Award, Sue asks Superintendent Bob Harris for a letter of recommendation. In exchange, Harris asks Sue to help his nephew, Myron Muskovitz, plan a lavish musical performance for his upcoming bar mitzvah party. When Sue defers to the New Directions, Myron asks them to perform at the party as well. Mason, having developed feelings for Jane, is anxious to perform with her, but he is prevented from doing so by Madison. When he asks Jane anyway and tells Madison that she is to sing with Roderick instead of him, Madison freaks out. However, after Mason performs a telling solo about independence at the party, Madison relents and allows her brother to further pursue Jane. Spencer develops a crush on a student named Alistair, and decides to help Roderick—who is Alistair's friend—improve his fitness if he helps him strike up a friendship. Despite Spencer's abrasive personality, Roderick helps the two connect, resulting in Alistair being convinced to join New Directions. Myron also joins the glee club due to his uncle's influence, which infuriates Sue, as now she cannot destroy the club without invoking the ire of her superior.
118	10	"The Rise and Fall of Sue Sylvester"	Anthony Hemingway	Jessica Meyer	March 6, 2015	6ARC11	1.81
After Dalton Academy unexpectedly burns to the ground, the Warblers join New Directions to form one unified team. Sue tries to exert her authority and have the Warblers removed; an angered Becky ends her friendship with Sue and reveal the secrets of her hurt locker to Superintendent Harris. Sue is fired as McKinley's principal, and in the aftermath, consents to be interviewed by Geraldo Rivera for Fox News. In reality, Rivera is conducting an exposé on Sue, publicly revealing that she is a compulsive liar, and that her parents lied about being Nazi hunters in order to avoid her because she was a problem child. Only two people interviewed by Rivera—Sheldon and Will—stand up for Sue in the end. Afterwards, Sue's mother Doris visits her and, after apologizing to each other for their wrongdoings, they both reconcile with a duet. Battered but not beaten, Sue is then hired as Vocal Adrenaline's new coach. Rachel returns to NYADA to beg Carmen Tibideaux for a second chance, but is thrown out. Upon her return to Lima, she receives word that she has been cast in the musical she auditioned for a few weeks before, and decides to leap at the opportunity. Sam expresses concern that she is making the wrong choice, but when Tibideaux calls Rachel to accept her back into NYADA, Rachel remains steadfast in her decision to pursue the musical.
119	11	"We Built This Glee Club"	Joaquin Sedillo	Aristotle Kousakis	March 13, 2015	6ARC12	2.02
Rachel receives a surprise visit from Jesse St. James, who reveals that he has been cast as the male lead opposite her in the new musical. Despite telling Sam that she's made up her mind, Rachel is still unsure as to whether she should go back to college. Spencer severely sprains his ankle, and opts for a cortisone injection so that he can still perform with his friends. Roderick, however, finds a better solution by incorporating Spencer into the Sectionals set in a unique way. Before the day of the competition, Sue glitter bombs the choir room, taints the McKinley water supply and sets fire to Will's car, all seemingly for revenge. Her coaching of Vocal Adrenaline also results in an overblown competition set, complete with human cannonballs. This ostentatiousness costs them the victory, with New Directions emerging as the winners. Afterwards, Sue tells Will that, because he stood up for her during Rivera's exposé, she had sabotaged Vocal Adrenaline by deliberately alienating the judges, while also helping New Directions improve their physiologies with her earlier pranks, thereby ensuring their victory. After Sectionals ends, Rachel tells Jesse that she has decided to return to NYADA and turn down the musical. Though disappointed, he accepts her decision and offers her a place to stay in New York; the two then share a kiss before parting.
120	12	"2009"	Paris Barclay	Ryan Murphy & Brad Falchuk & Ian Brennan	March 20, 2015	6ARC09	2.69
The episode is a flashback to the show's pilot episode, exploring how in 2009 the original members of New Directions—Rachel, Kurt, Mercedes, Artie and Tina—came to join the club. Kurt is friendless and depressed; believing him to be suicidal, guidance counselor Emma Pillsbury expresses her concerns to Burt, who orders Kurt to join a school team for his own good. Hoping to please his father, Kurt befriends Rachel and Mercedes, who suggest that he audition for Will Schuester's new glee club. After signing up herself, Mercedes is targeted by Rachel as a potential rival for the position of lead female vocalist, and the two immediately butt heads. After Will gives the first female solo to Rachel, Mercedes' confidence is shattered until she is given a pep talk by her church's choir director. Artie and Tina both audition because of a dare, and Sue and Will are on good terms with each other until he refuses to give up on the glee club in order to maintain their friendship. After Will's wife Terri reveals that she is pregnant and convinces him to give up teaching and take up accounting, Rachel tries unsuccessfully to get Terri to change her mind. The five original members of the glee club are also conflicted over Finn Hudson's leadership, questioning his commitment after he quits and later rejoins. During a meeting between the five, Rachel and Artie convince the others to give Finn another chance, as they believe in his good qualities. The episode concludes with the pilot episode's now-iconic staging of "Don't Stop Believin'", which is what convinced Will to stay on as choir director.
121	13	"Dreams Come True"	Bradley Buecker	Ryan Murphy & Brad Falchuk & Ian Brennan	March 20, 2015	6ARC13	2.54
After New Directions wins Nationals, Superintendent Harris has McKinley converted into a performing arts school and appoints Will to be its principal. This allows him to add more choirs in addition to New Directions, whose leadership he hands off to Sam. As the school begins its transition, the original New Directions alumni gather for a final time to say goodbye to both the school and to each other. Mercedes announces that she has been chosen as the opening act for Beyoncé's world tour, and tells her friends that she will not see them for a long time; nevertheless, she reassures them that they will be together again. Kurt and Blaine thank Sue for her efforts to reunite them after their breakup, and Sue, in turn, mends fences with both Becky and Will. The episode then reveals the fates of the characters in 2020: Kurt and Blaine are theater actors who also visit schools and spread messages of acceptance and equality; Sue has become Vice President of United States under Jeb Bush; Artie and Tina are together, with Tina having starred in a film Artie directed that is to premiere at the Slamdance Film Festival; and Rachel is a Tony Award-winning Broadway star, married to Jesse, and also the surrogate mother of Kurt and Blaine's child. Sometime during that year, Vice President Sue invites Will, Emma, Sheldon, Burt, Carole, Principal Figgins and Terri to a rededication of McKinley's auditorium in Finn Hudson's name, where she finally espouses the virtues of glee. After her speech, Will and nearly all of his former students from every season of the show come together in song for a final time.

== Cast ==
Glee season 6 main cast

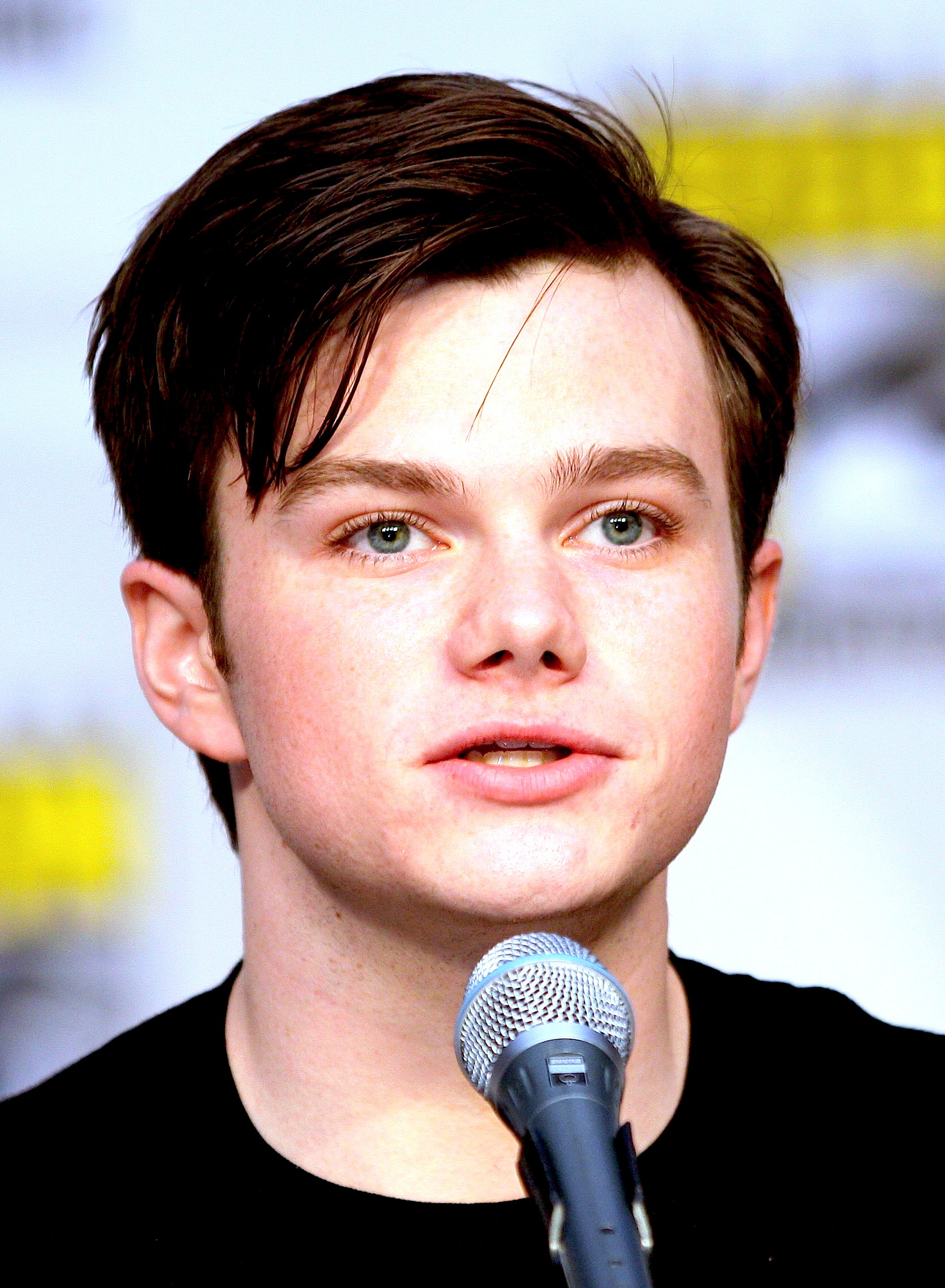
Chris Colfer

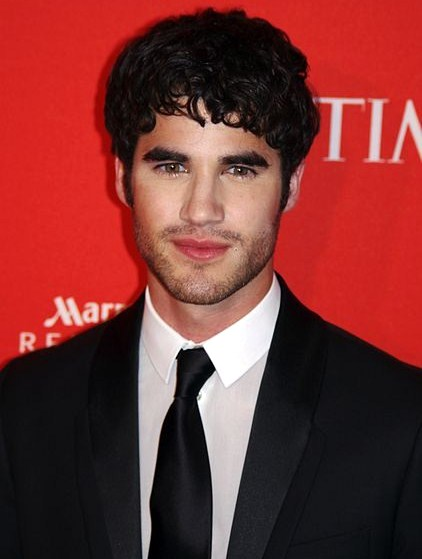
Darren Criss

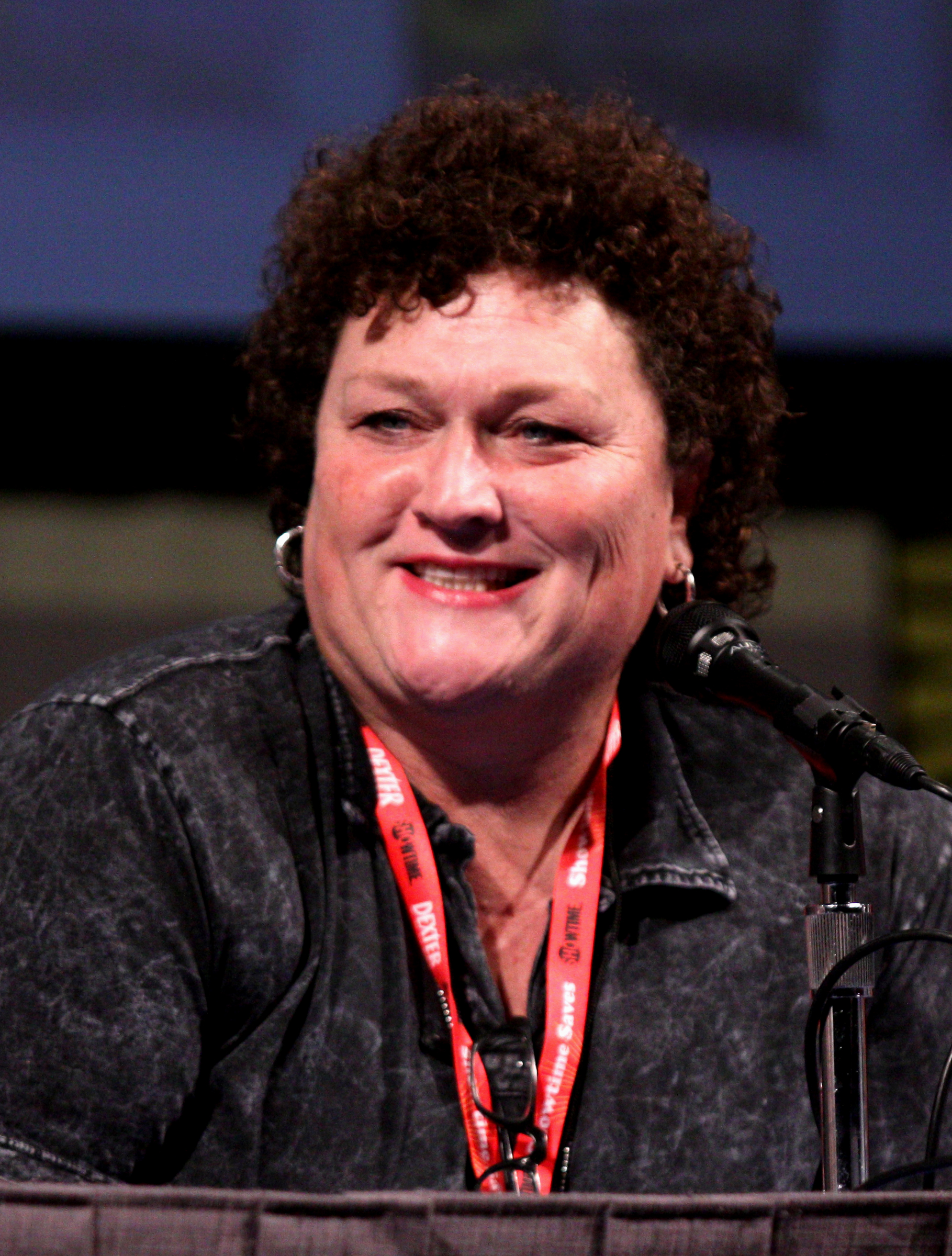
Dot Jones

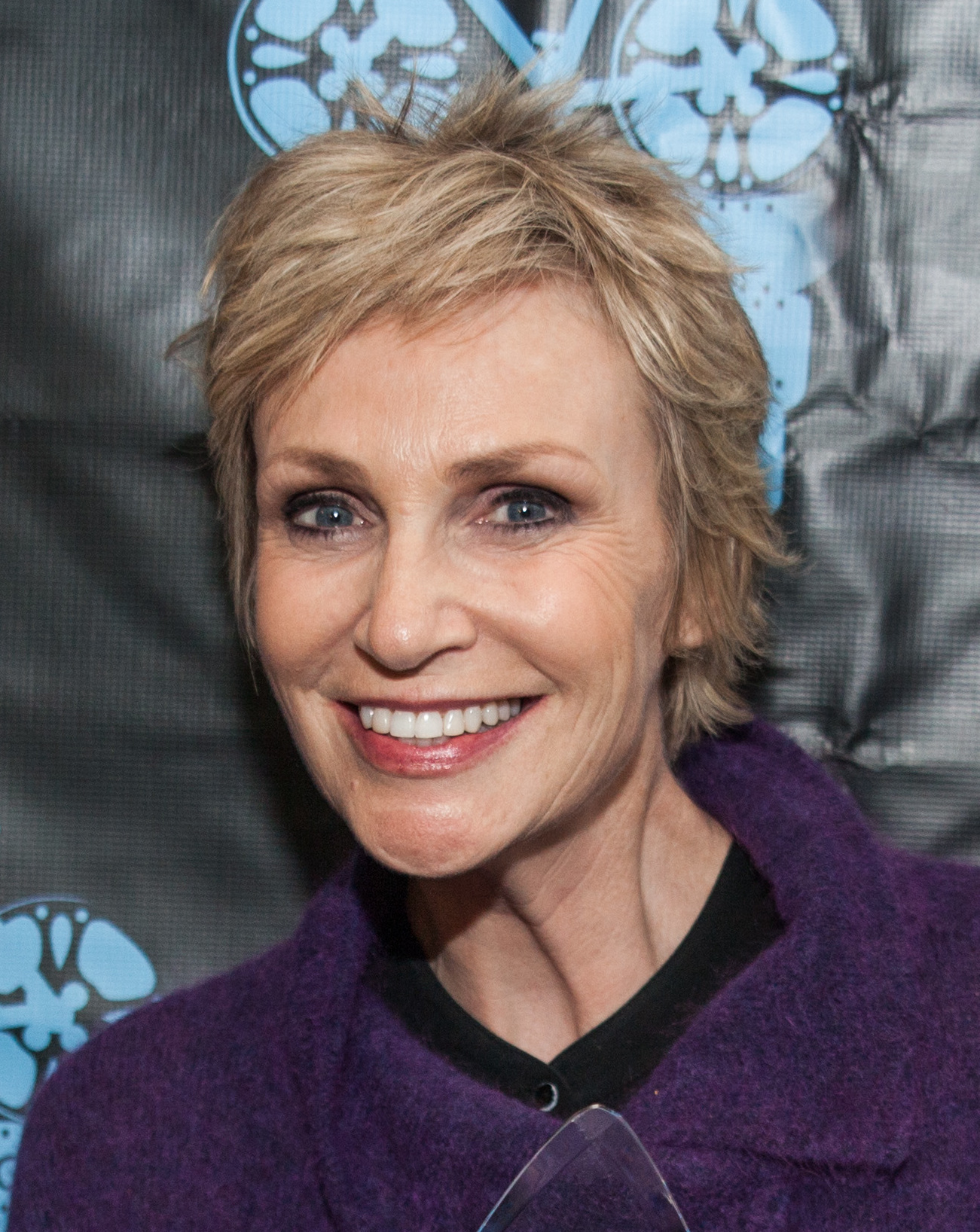
Jane Lynch

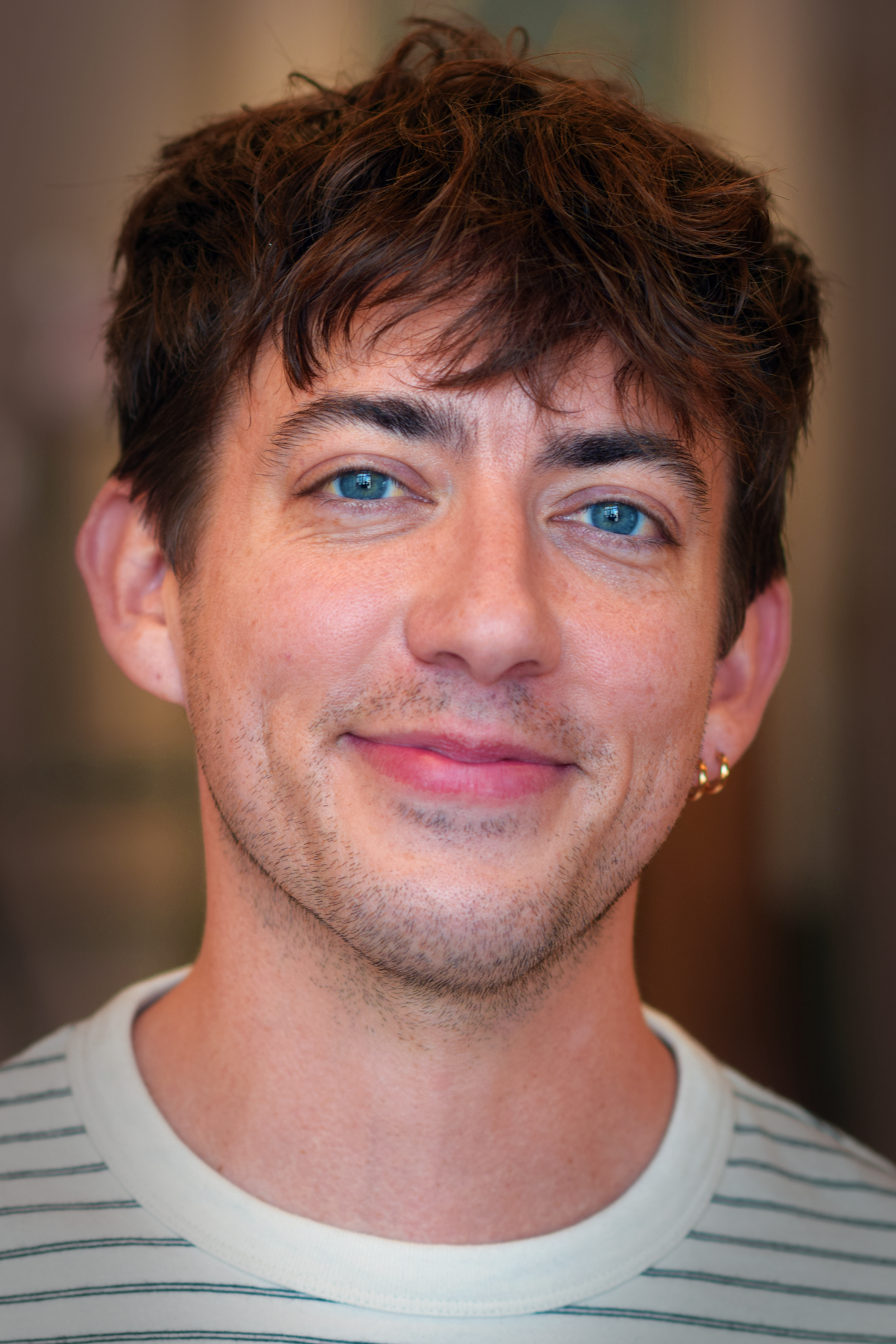
Kevin McHale

Lea Michele

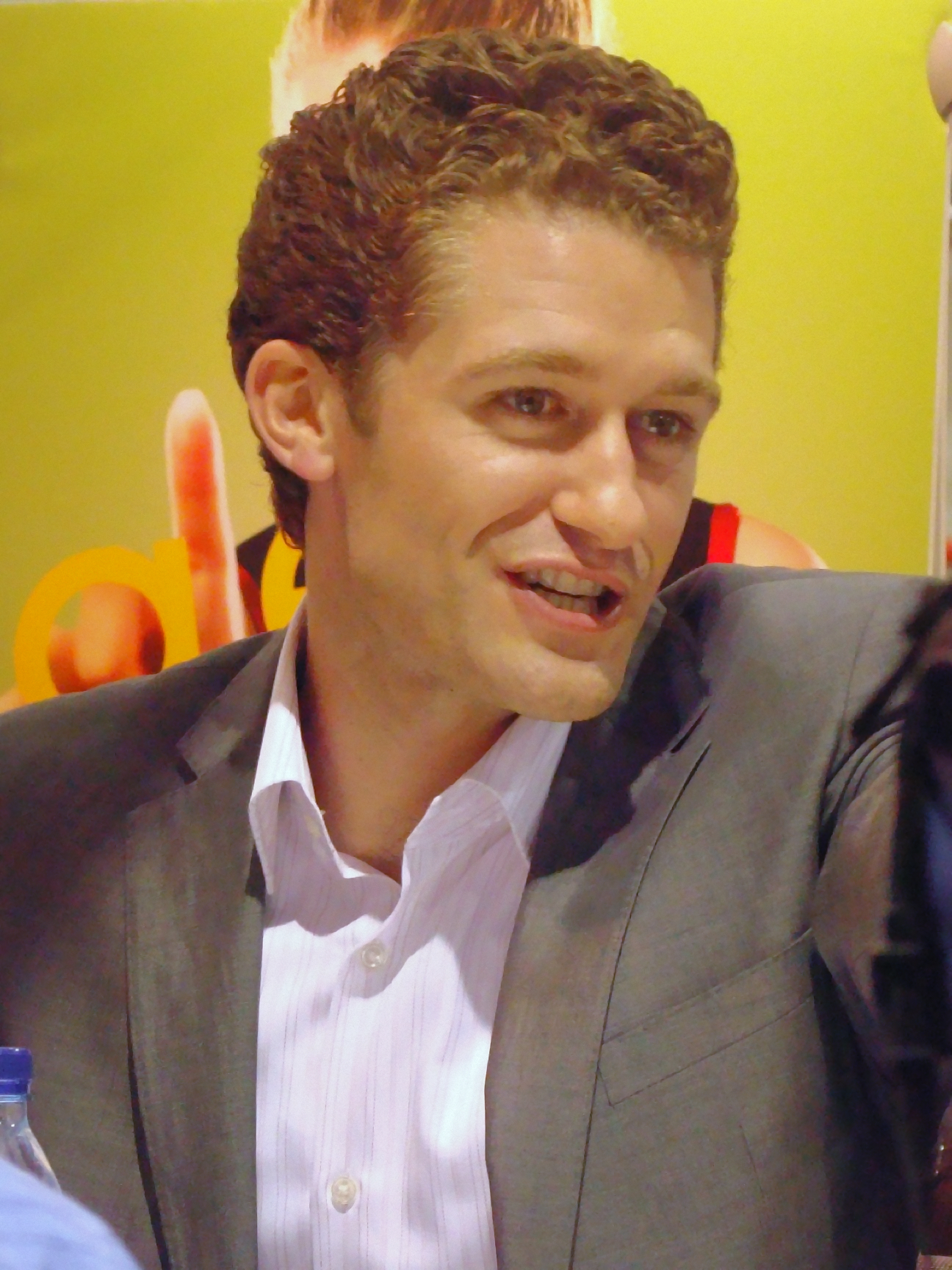
Matthew Morrison

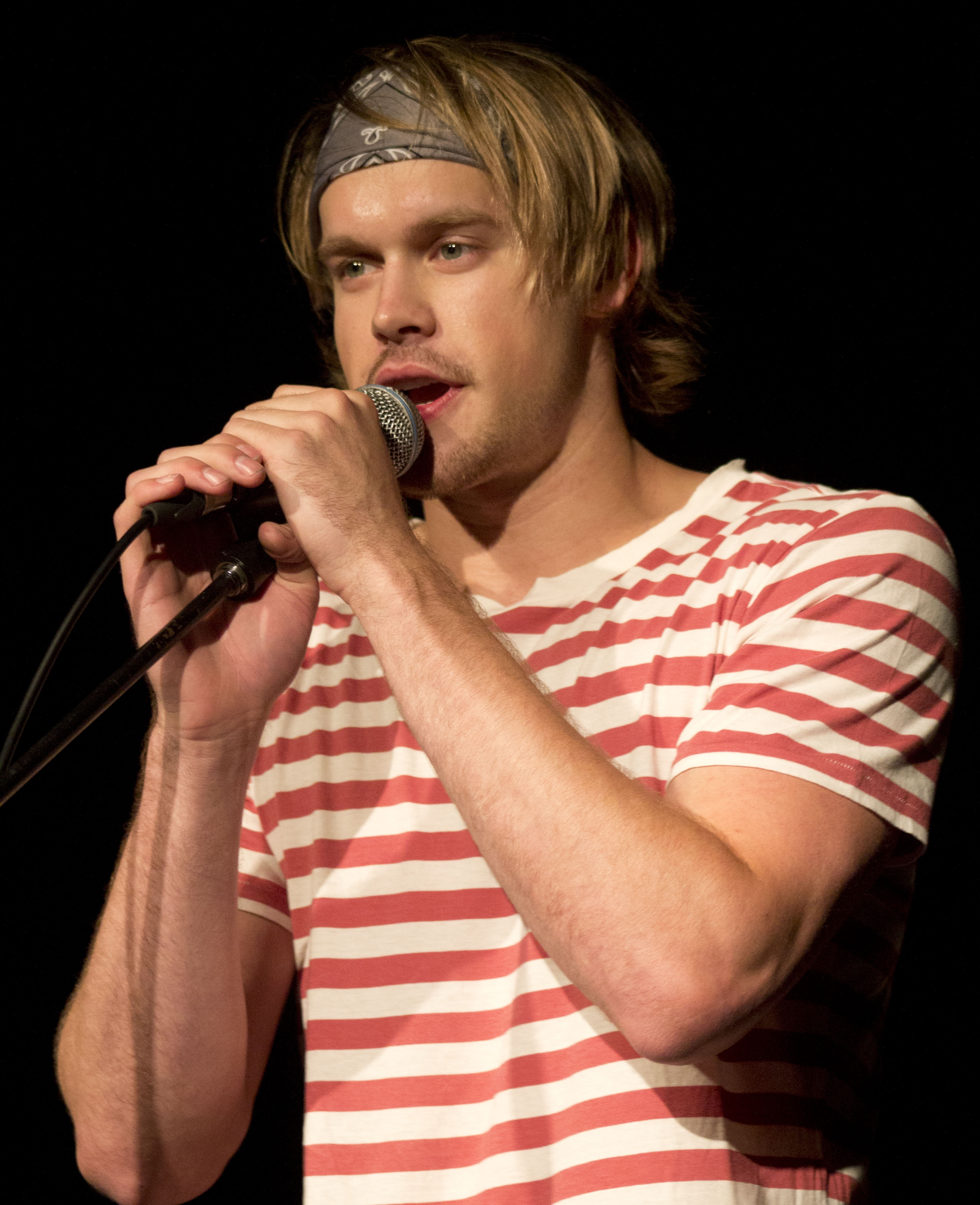
Chord Overstreet

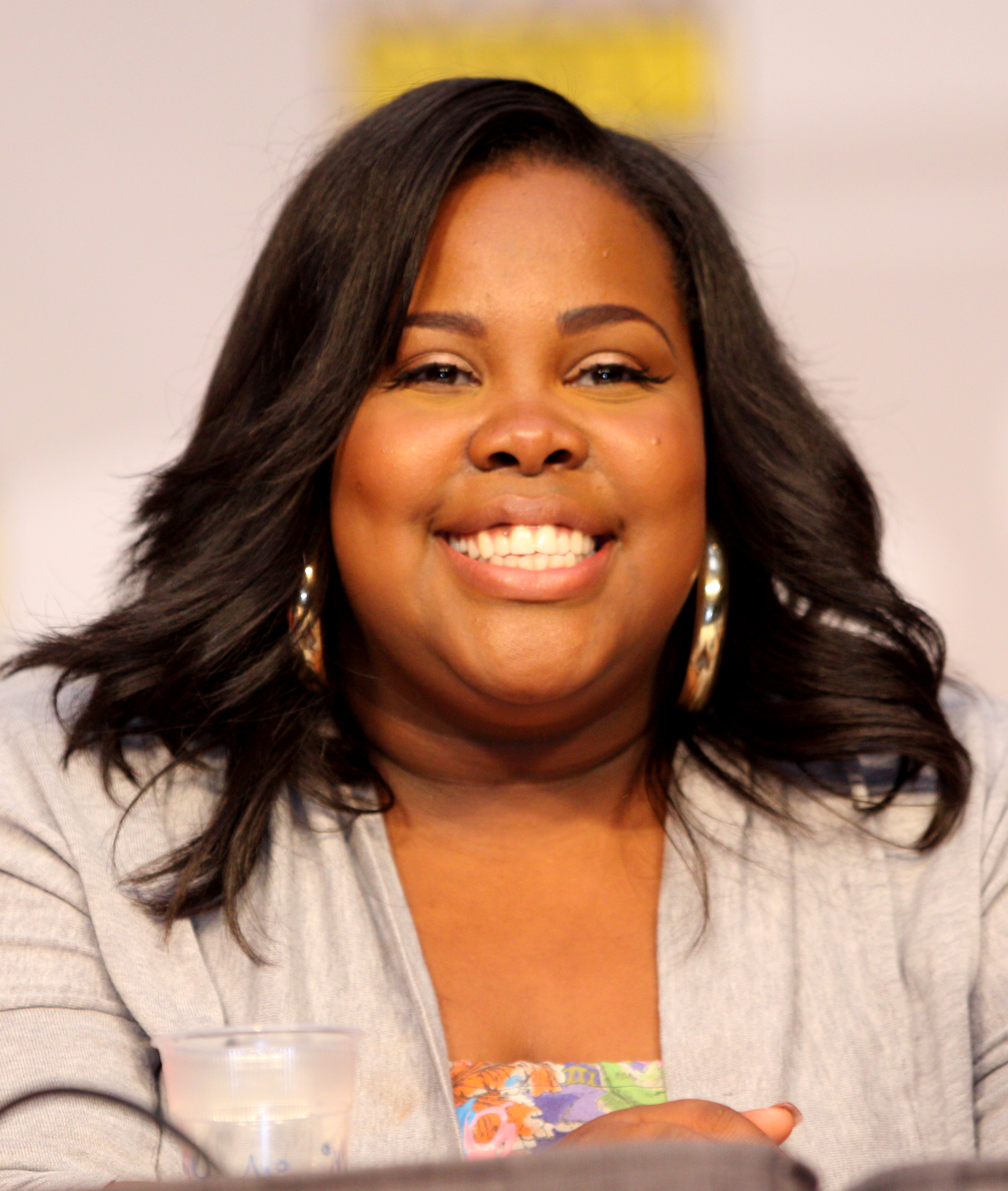
Amber Riley

The main cast was reduced for the sixth season: Chris Colfer, Darren Criss, Jane Lynch, Kevin McHale, Lea Michele, Matthew Morrison, and Chord Overstreet continue from the previous season while Amber Riley returned to the main cast and Dot-Marie Jones was promoted to the main cast after four years as a recurring guest star.

Former previous main cast members who return as guest stars include Jenna Ushkowitz, Dianna Agron, Mark Salling, Jayma Mays, Naya Rivera, Heather Morris, Becca Tobin, Harry Shum Jr., Mike O'Malley, Alex Newell, Jessalyn Gilsig, Jacob Artist, and Blake Jenner. Past recurring guest stars returning during the season include Iqbal Theba, Lauren Potter, Max Adler, Gloria Estefan, Romy Rosemont, Brian Stokes Mitchell, NeNe Leakes, Ivonne Coll, Jonathan Groff, Vanessa Lengies, Ashley Fink, Samuel Larsen, and Dijon Talton.

Five new major recurring characters were introduced: Roderick (Noah Guthrie), a shy teenager with a good voice, Spencer Porter (Marshall Williams), a "post-modern gay" football player, Jane Hayward (Samantha Marie Ware), an ambitious girl who originally intends to join the Warblers, and twins Mason (Billy Lewis Jr.) and Madison McCarthy (Laura Dreyfuss), cheerleaders who are strange but positive. The Wanted's Max George plays Clint, the villainous new Vocal Adrenaline lead singer. Harry Hamlin guest starred as Walter, Kurt's brief love interest who is in his 50s. Josie Totah plays Myron Muskovitz, a spoiled but talented 13-year-old tween and Finneas O'Connell plays Alistair, the love interest for Spencer. Special guest stars include Ken Jeong and Jennifer Coolidge as Brittany's parents, and Gina Gershon as Blaine's mother. Michael Bolton, Geraldo Rivera, and Carnie Wilson appear as themselves. Carol Burnett reprises her role as Doris, Sue's mother, for the first time since the second season.

== Reception ==
=== Critical response ===
The opening of the season was received with positive reviews from critics, most of them remarking how it reminds them of Glee's first seasons. The sixth-season premiere was the lowest watched season premiere in the show's history, with a rating of 2.34 and in adults 18-49 the premiere scored a 0.7/2.

The review aggregator website Rotten Tomatoes gives the sixth season a 72% with an average rating of 5.77/10, based on 18 reviews. The site's critics consensus reads, "The band plays on in a truncated final season that is a little daffier and overstuffed than where Glee began, but some disciplined storytelling and sweetly rendered character arcs harmonizes one grande finale that will hearten the New Directions' faithful."

=== Ratings ===
==== Live + SD Ratings ====
Viewership and ratings per episode of Glee season 6
No.	Title	Air date	Rating/share (18–49)	Viewers (millions)	DVR (18–49)	Total (18–49)
1	"Loser Like Me"	January 9, 2015	0.8/3	2.34	0.5	1.2
2	"Homecoming"	January 9, 2015	0.7/2	2.34	0.5	1.2
3	"Jagged Little Tapestry"	January 16, 2015	0.7/2	1.98	0.6	1.3
4	"The Hurt Locker, Part One"	January 23, 2015	0.7/2	1.82	0.5	1.2
5	"The Hurt Locker, Part Two"	January 30, 2015	0.7/2	1.85	0.4	1.1
6	"What the World Needs Now"	February 6, 2015	0.5/2	1.58	0.6	1.1
7	"Transitioning"	February 13, 2015	0.6/2	1.81	0.5	1.1
8	"A Wedding"	February 20, 2015	0.6/2	1.86	0.6	1.2
9	"Child Star"	February 27, 2015	0.6/2	1.69	0.6	1.2
10	"The Rise and Fall of Sue Sylvester"	March 6, 2015	0.6/2	1.81	0.6	1.2
11	"We Built This Glee Club"	March 13, 2015	0.7/2	2.02	0.5	1.2
12	"2009"	March 20, 2015	0.8/2	2.69	0.6	1.3
13	"Dreams Come True"	March 20, 2015	0.7/2	2.54	0.6	1.3

== Home media releases ==
Glee – The Final Season
Set Details		Special Features
13 Episodes; 4 Disc Set; English 5.1 Dolby Digital; Subtitles: English SDH, French, Spanish; Runtime: 570 Minutes		Glee: The Final Curtain; Glee Music Jukebox; Looking Back Video Yearbook
Release Dates
Region 1	Region 2	Region 4
May 19, 2015	August 24, 2015	August 11, 2015
