= David Larsen =

American stage actor

- Born: April 23, 1980 (age 46); Portland, Oregon, US

David Larsen (born April 23, 1980) is an American stage actor. A 1998 graduate of Hillsboro High School, Larsen starred in many of its productions, including the title role in Joseph and the Amazing Technicolor Dreamcoat.

Larsen attended Pittsburgh, Pennsylvania's Carnegie Mellon University and performed in nine shows. Afterward, he was a member of the ensemble for many off-Broadway productions including The Sound of Music and Seven Brides for Seven Brothers. Larsen eventually landed a three-episode spot on TV's Boston Public. This exposure helped lead to his casting as Riff in West Side Story, as well as the lead role of Bobby in the Broadway production Good Vibrations. In October 2008, he joined the company of Billy Elliot as a member of the ensemble while understudying the role of Tony. He briefly left the production in March 2011 for several weeks to take on the role of Tunny in American Idiot on Broadway, replacing actor Stark Sands. He stayed with the production until its April 24, 2011 closing. In 2013, Larsen finished his run with the new musical titled Hands on a Hardbody, which premiered at the La Jolla Playhouse in April. He played the role of veteran soldier Chris Alvaro. Larsen reprised his role when the show opened on Broadway, beginning previews on February 23, 2013. It ran for a total of twenty eight performances before closing in April. Later in 2014, Larsen joined the second national tour of The Book of Mormon, playing the role of Elder Kevin Price.

In 2018, Larsen joined the lineup of Under the Streetlamp, a vocal quartet otherwise consisting of alumni of the Chicago and touring productions of Jersey Boys.
