= The Book of Mormon (musical) =

Religious satire musical

- Broadway promotional poster
- Music: Trey Parker; Robert Lopez; Matt Stone
- Lyrics: Trey Parker; Robert Lopez; Matt Stone
- Book: Trey Parker; Robert Lopez; Matt Stone
- Premiere: March 24, 2011: Eugene O'Neill Theatre, New York City
- Productions: 2011 Broadway; 2012 1st North American tour; 2012 2nd North American tour; 2013 West End; 2019 1st UK tour; 2022 US non-equity tour; 2024 2nd UK tour
- Awards: List of awards: Tony Award for Best Musical; Tony Award for Best Book of a Musical; Tony Award for Best Original Score; Grammy Award for Best Musical Theater Album; Drama Desk Award for Outstanding Musical; Drama Desk Award for Outstanding Music; Drama Desk Award for Outstanding Lyrics; Laurence Olivier Award for Best New Musical; Helpmann Award for Best Musical

The Book of Mormon is an American musical comedy with music, lyrics, and book by Trey Parker, Robert Lopez, and Matt Stone. The story follows two missionaries of the Church of Jesus Christ of Latter-day Saints as they attempt to preach the faith to the inhabitants of a remote Ugandan village. The earnest young men are challenged by the lack of interest from the locals, who are distracted by more pressing issues such as HIV/AIDS, famine, and oppression by the local warlord.

The show premiered on Broadway at the Eugene O'Neill Theatre in March 2011, starring Andrew Rannells and Josh Gad. It garnered critical acclaim and set records in ticket sales for the Eugene O'Neill Theatre. The Book of Mormon was awarded nine Tony Awards, including Best Musical, and a Grammy Award for Best Musical Theater Album. The success of the Broadway production has spawned many stagings worldwide, including a long-running West End replica and several US national tours.

The Book of Mormon has grossed over $900 million, making it one of the most successful musicals of all time. As of September 2026, it is the ninth longest-running Broadway show, having played more than 5,000 performances.

== History ==
The Book of Mormon was conceived by Trey Parker, Matt Stone and Robert Lopez. Lopez was best known for co-creating the puppet musical Avenue Q (2003). After the success of The Book of Mormon, he later became known for co-writing the songs featured in the Disney animated films Frozen, its sequel Frozen II, and Coco, with his wife Kristen Anderson-Lopez.

Parker and Stone are best known for their animated television series South Park for Comedy Central. A thread of fascination with Mormonism runs through their work, owing to their upbringing in Colorado, within the so-called Mormon corridor. The two had first thought of a fictionalized Joseph Smith, religious leader and founder of the Latter Day Saint movement, while working on an aborted Fox series about historical characters. Additionally, the two had collaborated on several musicals, including their student film Cannibal! The Musical (1993), as well as South Park: Bigger, Longer & Uncut (1999). Other references to Mormonism in their work prior to the musical include their 1997 film Orgazmo. A 2003 episode of South Park, "All About Mormons", gave comic treatment to the religion, and Joseph Smith was also included as one of the "Super Best Friends", a Justice League parody team of religious figures.

=== Development ===
During the summer of 2003, Parker and Stone flew to New York City to discuss the script of their new film, Team America: World Police, with friend and producer Scott Rudin (who also produced South Park: Bigger, Longer & Uncut). Rudin advised the duo to see the musical Avenue Q on Broadway, finding the cast of marionettes in Team America similar to the puppets of Avenue Q. Parker and Stone went to see the production during that summer and the writer-composers of Avenue Q, Robert Lopez and Jeff Marx, noticed them in the audience and introduced themselves. Lopez revealed that South Park: Bigger, Longer & Uncut was highly influential in the creation of Avenue Q. The quartet went for drinks afterwards and soon found that each camp wanted to write something involving Joseph Smith. The four began working out details nearly immediately, with the idea to create a modern story formulated early on. For research purposes, the quartet took a road trip to Salt Lake City, where they "interviewed a bunch of missionaries—or ex-missionaries." They had to work around Parker and Stone's South Park schedule.

In 2006, Parker and Stone flew to London, where they spent three weeks with Lopez, who was working on the West End production of Avenue Q. There, the three wrote "four or five songs" and came up with the basic idea of the story. After an argument between Parker and Marx, who felt he was not getting enough creative control, Marx was separated from the project. For the next few years, the remaining trio met frequently to develop what they initially called The Book of Mormon: The Musical of the Church of Jesus Christ of Latter-day Saints. "There was a lot of hopping back and forth between L.A. and New York," Parker recalled.

=== Song alterations ===
Numerous changes were disclosed between the original script and the final production. A song named "Family Home Evening", which was in early workshops of the show, was cut. The warlord in Uganda was called General Kony in previews, but this was changed to General Butt Fucking Naked. The song "The Bible Is a Trilogy" went through a major rewrite to become "All-American Prophet". The earlier version was based on how the third movie in movie trilogies is always the best one and sums up everything, which led to a recurring Matrix joke where a Ugandan man said, "I thought the third Matrix was the worst one," which later changed to "I have maggots in my scrotum" in the rewritten version. The song "Spooky Mormon Hell Dream" was originally called "H-E Double Hockey Sticks".

=== Workshops ===
Lopez pushed to workshop the project, which confused Parker and Stone, who were not familiar with the practice. The crew embarked on the first of a half-dozen workshops that would take place during the next four years, ranging from 30-minute mini-performances for family and friends to much larger-scale renderings of the embryonic show. Parker and Stone spent hundreds of thousands of dollars of their own money, still unconvinced they would take it any further. At an early workshop, a rudimentary animatic was displayed above the actors onstage, as Parker and Stone were unsure as to whether the project should be a stage show or animated film. These developmental workshops were directed by Jason Moore. The first fully staged reading took place at the Vineyard Theatre in February 2008, after which the decision was made to officially develop the project into a stage show. Further workshops were staged in Los Angeles.

Several members of the original cast, including Josh Gad, Rory O’Malley, and Nikki James were involved from its earliest stages. The producers cycled through a series of actors in the search for the right Elder Price, including Benjamin Walker, Cheyenne Jackson, and Daniel Reichard. Three finalists included T. R. Knight, Nick Lachey, and Andrew Rannells, who won the part. There was briefly talk of celebrity stunt casting, including Jack Black as Cunningham. Moore was originally set to direct, but left the production in June 2010. Other directors, including James Lapine, were optioned to join the creative team, but the producers recruited Casey Nicholaw. A final five-week investor's workshop to secure funding took place in August 2010, when Nicholaw came on board as choreographer and co-director with Parker.

=== Broadway premiere ===
Producers Scott Rudin and Anne Garefino originally planned to stage The Book of Mormon off-Broadway at the New York Theatre Workshop in summer 2010, but opted to premiere it directly on Broadway, "[s]ince the guys [Parker and Stone] work best when the stakes are highest." Rudin and Garefino booked the Eugene O'Neill Theatre and hired key players while sets were designed and built. The producers expected the production to cost $11 million, but it came in under budget at $9 million. Hundreds of actors auditioned and 28 were cast. The crew did four weeks of rehearsals, with an additional two weeks of technical rehearsals, and then went directly into previews. The producers first watched the finished production six days before the first paying audience.

=== 2020 revisions ===
In 2020, in the aftermath of the murder of George Floyd, Black actors from the original and current casts stated in a letter to the creative team that changes would be needed to reflect modern-day perceptions and avoid tropes that were commonplace in the past. (The Book of Mormon was not alone in this; similar discussions affected several other musicals which touched on African and Black representation at the time, such as The Lion King.) Script revisions were instigated to center the villagers rather than the missionaries and to show them as having more agency than the original script had suggested.

In addition, a sequence in Hell depicts Elder Price being accosted by Genghis Khan, Jeffrey Dahmer, Adolf Hitler, and Johnnie Cochran was revised: replacing Dahmer with Jeffrey Epstein as Dahmer's cultural relevance had faded since the musical's opening.

== Synopsis ==
=== Act I ===
At a Missionary Training Center of the Church of Jesus Christ of Latter-day Saints, devout missionary-to-be Elder Kevin Price leads his classmates in a demonstration of the door-to-door method to convert people to the Church of Jesus Christ of Latter-day Saints ("Hello!"). Price believes if he prays enough, he will be sent to Orlando, Florida, for his two-year mission. However, he learns he will instead be sent to Uganda and paired with Elder Arnold Cunningham, an insecure, pop culture–obsessed compulsive liar ("Two by Two"). Price is sure he is destined to do something incredible, while Cunningham is just happy to follow ("You and Me (But Mostly Me)").

Upon arrival in northern Uganda, the two are robbed by soldiers of a local warlord, General Butt Fucking Naked. The missionaries are welcomed to the village by Mafala Hatimbi. A group of villagers share their daily reality of living in appalling conditions while being ruled by the General. To help them feel better in times of trouble, the villagers repeat a phrase that translates as "Fuck you, God!" ("Hasa Diga Eebowai").

Price and Cunningham are led to their living quarters by Nabulungi, Mafala's daughter. They meet their fellow missionaries stationed in the area, who have been unable to convert anyone to the Church. Elder McKinley, the district leader, teaches Price and Cunningham to suppress upsetting ideas ("Turn It Off"). By the time they retire for the night, Price is riddled with anxiety, but Cunningham reassures him that he will succeed and that, as his companion, Cunningham will be by his side no matter what ("I Am Here for You").

Price is confident he can succeed where the other elders have failed, teaching the villagers about Joseph Smith through a song that begins as a tribute to Smith but eventually descends into a tribute by Price to himself ("All-American Prophet"). The General arrives and announces his demand for the genital mutilation of all female villagers. After a villager protests, the General murders him. Taking every last measure to protect her, Mafala commands Nabulungi to stay in their house with all the doors locked and windows closed. She protests, insisting that the women of the village will not have to stay in hiding if they listen to the missionaries, as they hold the secrets to liberation, protection, and eternal happiness. Though her protests to go out and talk to them fail, she calms down after remembering how she was moved by Price's promise of an earthly paradise. She yearns to live in that new land, Salt Lake City, with all of her fellow villagers ("Sal Tlay Ka Siti").

The mission president has requested a progress report on their mission. Shocked by the execution and the reality of Africa, Price decides to abandon his mission and requests a transfer to Orlando. Meanwhile, ever-loyal Cunningham assures Price that he will follow him anywhere. However, Price unceremoniously dumps him as mission companion ("I Am Here for You [Reprise]"). Cunningham is crushed and alone, but Nabulungi comes to him, wanting to learn more about the Book of Mormon and having convinced the villagers to listen to him. Cunningham finds the courage to take control of the situation ("Man Up").

=== Act II ===
Cunningham attempts to teach the Book of Mormon to the villagers, but when they become frustrated and begin leaving, Cunningham quickly develops stories, combining what he knows of LDS Church doctrine with pieces of science fiction and fantasy. Cunningham's conscience (personified by his father, Joseph Smith, Hobbits, Lt. Uhura, Darth Vader, and Yoda) admonishes him, but he rationalizes that if it helps people, it surely cannot be wrong ("Making Things Up Again"). Meanwhile, Price joyfully arrives in Orlando, but then realizes that he is dreaming his childhood nightmares of Hell and sees Jesus, Satan, Genghis Khan, Jeffrey Epstein (it had previously been Jeffrey Dahmer prior to 2026), Adolf Hitler, and Johnnie Cochran, who all call him out on abandoning Cunningham ("Spooky Mormon Hell Dream"). Price awakens and decides to re-commit to his mission.

Cunningham announces that several Ugandans are interested in the Church, but McKinley explains that unless the General is dealt with, no one will convert. Price, seeing this as his chance to prove his worth, sets off on the "mission he was born to do." After reaffirming his faith, he confronts the General, determined to convert him ("I Believe"). The General is unimpressed and drags Price away.

Cunningham concludes his preaching, and the villagers are baptized, with Nabulungi and Cunningham sharing a tender moment as they do ("Baptize Me"). The missionaries feel oneness with the people of Uganda and celebrate ("I Am Africa"). Meanwhile, Price is seen in the village doctor's office, having the Book of Mormon removed from his rectum. The General hears of the villagers' conversion and resolves to kill them all.

Having lost his faith, Price drowns his sorrows in coffee. Cunningham finds Price and tells him they need to at least act like mission companions, as the mission president is coming to visit the Ugandan mission. Price reflects on all the broken promises the Church, his parents, his friends, and life in general made to him ("Orlando").

Nabulungi and the villagers perform a pageant for the mission president to "honor [him] with the story of Joseph Smith, the American Moses", which reflects the distortions put forth by Cunningham, such as having sex with a frog to cure their AIDS ("Joseph Smith American Moses"). The mission president is appalled, orders all the missionaries to go home, and tells Nabulungi that she and her fellow villagers are not members. Nabulungi, heartbroken at the thought that she will never reach paradise, curses God for forsaking her ("Hasa Diga Eebowai [Reprise]"). Price has an epiphany and realizes Cunningham was right all along: though scriptures are important, what is more important is getting the message across ("You and Me (But Mostly Me) [Reprise]").

The General arrives, and Nabulungi is ready to submit to him, telling the villagers that Cunningham's stories are untrue. She also explains that they will never see him again, but she protects his reputation in their eyes by saying that a lion ate him. To Nabulungi's shock, they respond that they have always known that Cunningham's stories were metaphors rather than literal truth. Price and Cunningham arrive, and, believing Cunningham to be resurrected from the dead, the General flees. Price rallies the members of the Church and the Ugandans to work together to make this their paradise. Later, the newly minted Ugandan elders (including the General) visit door-to-door to evangelize with "The Book of Arnold" ("Tomorrow Is a Latter Day"/"Hello! [Reprise]").

== Characters and cast members ==
The principal cast members of all major productions of The Book of Mormon.

=== Original casts ===
Characters	Broadway	First US tour	Second US tour	West End	First Australian tour	First UK tour	Third US tour	Second UK tour	Second Australian tour
Characters	2011	2012		2013	2017	2019	2022	2024	2025
Elder Price	Andrew Rannells	Gavin Creel	Nic Rouleau	Gavin Creel	Ryan Bondy	Kevin Clay	Sam McLellan	Adam Bailey	Sean Johnston
Elder Cunningham	Josh Gad	Jared Gertner	Ben Platt	Jared Gertner	A.J. Holmes	Conner Peirson	Sam Nackman	Sam Glen	Nick Cox
Nabulungi	Nikki M. James	Samantha Marie Ware	Syesha Mercado	Alexia Khadime	Zahra Newman	Nicole-Lily Baisden	Berlande	Nyah Nish	Paris Leveque
Elder McKinley	Rory O'Malley	Grey Henson	Pierce Cassedy	Stephen Ashfield	Rowan Witt	Will Hawksworth	Sean Casey Flanagan	Tom Bales	Tom Struik
Mafala Hatimbi	Michael Potts	Kevin Mambo	James Vincent Meredith	Giles Terera	Bert LaBonté	Ewen Cummins	Lamont J. Whitaker	Kirk Patterson	Simbarashe Matshe
General	Brian Tyree Henry	Derrick Williams	David Aron Damane	Chris Jarman	Augustin Aziz Tchantcho	Thomas Vernal	Dewight Braxton Jr.	Rodney Earl Clarke	Augie Tchantcho
Joseph Smith / Mission President	Lewis Cleale	Mike McGowan	Christopher Shyer	Haydn Oakley	Andrew Broadbent	Johnathan Tweedie	Trevor Dorner	Will Barratt	Matthew Hamilton

Three members of the original Broadway cast were still with the show for its 4,000th performance on June 14, 2022: Lewis Cleale, John Eric Parker (Matumbo) and Graham Bowen (the show's dance captain and a swing).

=== Notable replacements ===
==== Broadway (2011–present) ====
- Elder Price: Gavin Creel, Matt Doyle, Kyle Selig
- Elder Cunningham: Jon Bass, Jared Gertner, Christopher John O'Neill, Ben Platt
- Nabulungi: Asmeret Ghebremichael, Syesha Mercado, Samantha Marie Ware
- Elder McKinley: Stephen Ashfield, Grey Henson
- Mafala Hatimbi: Daniel Breaker, Sterling Jarvis, Stanley Wayne Mathis
- General: David Aron Damane

==== First North America tour (2012–2016) ====
- Elder Price: Mark Evans
- Elder Cunningham: A.J. Holmes, Christopher John O'Neill
- Mafala Hatimbi: Stanley Wayne Mathis
- Joseph Smith / Mission President: Ron Bohmer

==== Second North America tour (2012–2020) ====
- Elder Price: David Larsen
- Elder Cunningham: A.J. Holmes
- Nabalungi: Denée Benton, Alyah Chanelle Scott
- Mafala Hatimbi: Sterling Jarvis
- Joseph Smith / Mission President: Ron Bohmer
- Elder White: Dylan Mulvaney

==== West End (2013–present) ====
- Elder Cunningham: A.J. Holmes
- Nabulungi: Denée Benton, Asmeret Ghebremichael
- Elder McKinley: Steven Webb

== Music ==
=== Musical numbers ===
Act I

- "Hello!" – Mormons
- "Two by Two" – Price, Mormons
- "You and Me (But Mostly Me)" – Price, Cunningham
- "Hasa Diga Eebowai" – Mafala, Price, Cunningham, and Ugandans
- "Turn It Off" – McKinley, Mormons
- "I Am Here for You" – Cunningham, Price
- "All-American Prophet" – Price, Cunningham, Joseph Smith, Angel Moroni and Company
- "Sal Tlay Ka Siti" – Nabulungi
- "I Am Here for You" (Reprise)† – Cunningham
- "Man Up" – Cunningham, Nabulungi, Price, Doctor, Mormons, Ugandans

Act II

- "Making Things Up Again" – Cunningham, Cunningham's Dad, Joseph Smith, Mormon, Moroni, Uhura, Darth Vader, Hobbits, Ugandans
- "Spooky Mormon Hell Dream" – Price, Lucifer, Hitler, Genghis Khan, Jeffrey Dahmer/Epstein, Johnnie Cochran, Skeletons, Devils
- "I Believe" – Price, Ensemble
- "Baptize Me" – Cunningham and Nabulungi
- "I Am Africa" – McKinley, Cunningham, Doctor, Mormons, Ugandans
- "Orlando"† – Price
- "Joseph Smith American Moses" – Ugandans
- "Hasa Diga Eebowai" (Reprise)† – Nabulungi
- "You and Me (But Mostly Me)" (Reprise)† – Price and Cunningham
- "Tomorrow Is a Latter Day"†† – Price, Cunningham, McKinley, Nabulungi, Mormons, Ugandans
- "Hello!"†† (Reprise) – Company
- "Encore"†† – Company

† This song is not on the cast album.

†† These three songs are appended to one another and appear as one track.

=== Instrumentation ===
The Book of Mormon uses a nine-member orchestra:

- Woodwinds (Flute, Piccolo, Alto and Tenor Saxophones, Clarinet, Oboe, Bansuri, Soprano and Alto Recorders) †
- Trumpet (doubling Piccolo Trumpet and Flugelhorn)
- Trombone (doubling Bass Trombone)
- Drums/Percussion/Electronic percussion
- Keyboard I
- Keyboard II
- Violin/Viola
- Guitars (Electric, Acoustic, Classical and Archtop)
- Basses (Electric, Fretless and Upright)

† In the West End and UK Tour productions, the Woodwind part is reduced to just Flute, Piccolo, Alto Saxophone and Clarinet.

== Themes and references ==
The Book of Mormon contains many religious themes, most notably those of faith and doubt. Although the musical satirizes organized religion and the literal credibility of the Church of Jesus Christ of Latter-day Saints, the Mormons in The Book of Mormon are portrayed as well-meaning and optimistic, if a little naïve and unworldly. In addition, the central theme that many religious stories are rigid, out of touch, and silly comes to the conclusion that, essentially, religion itself can do enormous good as long as it is taken metaphorically and not literally. Matt Stone, one of the show's creators, described The Book of Mormon as "an atheist's love letter to religion."

The opening scenes of Act I and II parody the Hill Cumorah Pageant.

== Productions ==
=== Broadway (2011–present) ===
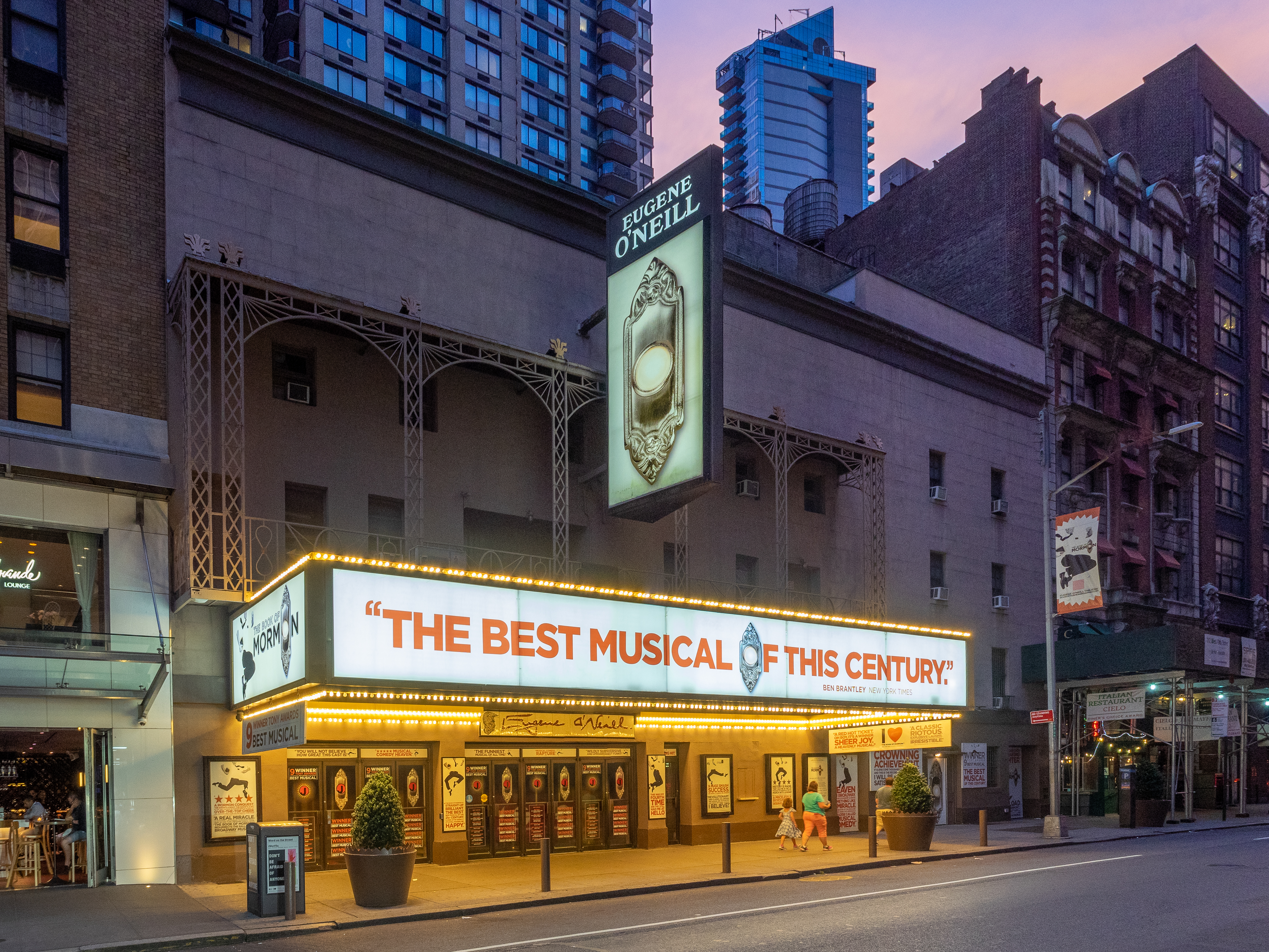
The Eugene O'Neill Theatre with The Book of Mormon in 2019

The Book of Mormon premiered on Broadway at the Eugene O'Neill Theatre on March 24, 2011, following previews since February 24. The production was choreographed by Casey Nicholaw and co-directed by Nicholaw and Parker. Set design was by Scott Pask, with costumes by Ann Roth, lighting by Brian MacDevitt, and sound by Brian Ronan. Orchestrations were co-created by Larry Hochman and the show's musical director and vocal arranger Stephen Oremus. The production was originally headlined by Josh Gad and Andrew Rannells in the two leading roles.

The New York production of The Book of Mormon employed an innovative pricing strategy, similar to the ones used in the airline and hotel industries. The producers charged as much as $477 for the best seats for performances with particularly high demand. During its first year, the show was consistently one of the top five best-selling shows on Broadway and set 22 new weekly sales records for the Eugene O'Neill Theater. For the week of Thanksgiving 2011, the average paid admission was over $170, even though the highest-priced regular seat was listed at $155. High attendance coupled with aggressive pricing allowed the financial backers to recoup their investment of $11.4 million after just nine months of performances.

After Gad's departure in June 2012, standby Jared Gertner played the role until June 26, when Cale Krise permanently took over the role, as Gertner left to play Elder Cunningham in the First National Tour. Two days after Gad left (June 2012), original star Rannells was replaced by his standby Nic Rouleau. The same day, Samantha Marie Ware played Nabulungi on Broadway as the start of a six-week engagement (James was shooting a film) in preparation for her tour performance. Following Rouleau's departure in November 2012 (to originate the role of Elder Price in Chicago), the role of Elder Price was taken over by Matt Doyle. In December 2012, Jon Bass joined as Elder Cunningham. Original cast member Rory O'Malley was replaced by Matt Loehr in January 2013.

In April 2013, Stanley Wayne Mathis joined the cast as Mafala Hatimbi. In May 2013, Jon Bass left the role of Elder Cunningham and was replaced by Cody Jamison Strand. After Doyle and Strand's contracts finished in January 2014, Rouleau and Ben Platt (who had previously played the role of Elder Cunningham while in Chicago with Rouleau) joined the Broadway cast to reprise their roles as Elder Price and Elder Cunningham. On August 26, 2014, Grey Henson took over for Loehr as Elder McKinley. Henson had previously played the role on the first national tour. Rouleau and Platt left Broadway in January 2015. They were replaced by Gavin Creel and Christopher John O'Neill, who played the roles of Price and Cunningham (respectively) on the first national tour. On January 3, 2016, Creel left the show after three and a half years. He was replaced by Kyle Selig, former Broadway and second national tour Elder Price standby, who was scheduled to play the role through February 21, 2016.

On January 25, 2016, Christopher John O'Neill was temporarily replaced by longtime Elder Cunningham standby Nyk Bielak. Bielak had been a standby for Elder Cunningham in all three North American companies before becoming the Broadway Elder Cunningham. On February 17, 2016, Nic Rouleau announced via Twitter that he would be taking over the role of Elder Price starting on February 23, 2016. This was Rouleau's third time playing the role on Broadway; he previously played the role in Chicago, the second national tour, and most recently, the West End. O'Neill and Rouleau's first performance together was on February 23, 2016. August 21, 2016, was Grey Henson's last performance as Elder McKinley. On August 23, 2016, Henson was replaced by Stephen Ashfield, who came over from the West End production. On November 7, 2016, Nikki Renée Daniels announced that she was pregnant with her second child and would be going on maternity leave. Later that week, Kim Exum took over the role of Nabalungi.

On February 20, 2017, Chris O'Neill and Daniel Breaker had their final performances as Elder Cunningham and Mafala Hatimbi. O'Neill was replaced by Brian Sears, who came over from the London production. Breaker was replaced by Billy Eugene Jones. On February 18, 2018, after six and a half years with the show, original cast member Nic Rouleau played his final performance as Elder Price. Original cast member Brian Sears also left the production that day. Rouleau was replaced by Dave Thomas Brown. Sears was replaced by longtime Elder Cunningham (on both Broadway and the second national tour) Cody Jamison Strand. Other Broadway cast members include original Broadway cast member Lewis Cleale as Joseph Smith/Mission President and other roles, and Derrick Williams as the General.

In response to the COVID-19 pandemic in New York City, the production was suspended on March 12, 2020, and subsequently reopened November 5.

A fire at the Eugene O'Neill Theatre in May 2026 also suspended the production temporarily.

=== First North American tour (2012–2016) ===
The first North American tour began previews on August 14, 2012, at the Denver Center for the Performing Arts in Denver, Colorado, before moving to the Pantages Theatre in Los Angeles, beginning September 5, with the official opening night for the tour on September 12. Originally planned to begin in December 2012, production was pushed forward four months. Gavin Creel (Price) and Jared Gertner (Cunningham) led the cast until late December, when West End performer Mark Evans and Christopher John O'Neill took over, allowing time for Creel and Gertner to begin rehearsals for their move to the West End production. After Evans left the show on June 30, 2014, Broadway Elder Price standby K.J. Hippensteel temporarily covered as Elder Price. Hippensteel returned to Broadway and Ryan Bondy (who was covering for Hippensteel as the Broadway Elder Price standby) took over the role of Elder Price. Bondy continued on as Elder Price until Creel returned from London later in the summer of 2014. When Creel and O'Neill left the touring production to join the Broadway production, Bondy again took over the role of Elder Price while Chad Burris took over for O'Neill as Elder Cunningham. The two were only leads for six weeks as they waited for replacements to come from the West End production. Billy Harrigan Tighe and A.J. Holmes moved over from the West End production to reprise their roles as Elders Price and Cunningham, respectively. Bondy and Burris then returned to the second national tour as standbys for Elder Price and Elder Cunningham.

As part of the tour, the musical was performed in Salt Lake City for the first time at the end of July and early August 2015.

The tour closed on May 1, 2016, in Honolulu, Hawaii.

=== Chicago and second North American tour (2012–2020) ===
The first replica sit-down production, separate from the tour, began previews on December 11, 2012, and officially opened on December 19 of that year, at the Bank of America Theatre in Chicago, Illinois, as part of Broadway in Chicago. The limited engagement closed October 6, 2013 and became the second U.S. national tour. The cast included Nic Rouleau in the role of Price, along with Ben Platt as Cunningham.

After the Chicago production closed on October 6, 2013, the same production began touring North America. Platt never went on tour with the production and Rouleau performed in only a few cities on the tour before they both moved to New York and started rehearsals in preparation for joining the Broadway production. David Larsen succeeded Nic Rouleau as Elder Price, A.J. Holmes succeeded Ben Platt as Elder Cunningham, and Cody Jamison Strand then succeeded A.J. Holmes in the role. December 14, 2014, was Pierce Cassedy's last performance as Elder McKinley. He was replaced by former Broadway swing Daxton Bloomquist. On January 3, 2016, Larsen completed his final show as Elder Price. Larsen was replaced by his standby, Ryan Bondy. Gabe Gibbs replaced Bondy as Elder Price in October 2016. Oge Agulué replaced David Aron Damane as the General in December 2016. On January 1, 2017, Cody Jamison Strand had his last performance as Elder Cunningham. Strand left the show to join the West End production. Strand was replaced by Conner Pierson on January 3, 2017. On October 24, 2017, longtime ensemble member Kevin Clay assumed the role of Elder Price. Clay had been with the tour since November 2015, and worked his way up from ensemble, to Elder Price understudy, to Elder Price standby, before finally assuming the role. Bondy left the touring cast to take over the role of Elder Price in the Melbourne production. Other cast members include Kayla Pecchioni as Nabulungi, PJ Adzima as Elder McKinley, and Sterling Jarvis as Mafala Hatimbi.

The tour played its final performance on March 11, 2020, in Los Angeles, closing earlier than planned due to the COVID-19 pandemic.

=== West End (2013–present) ===
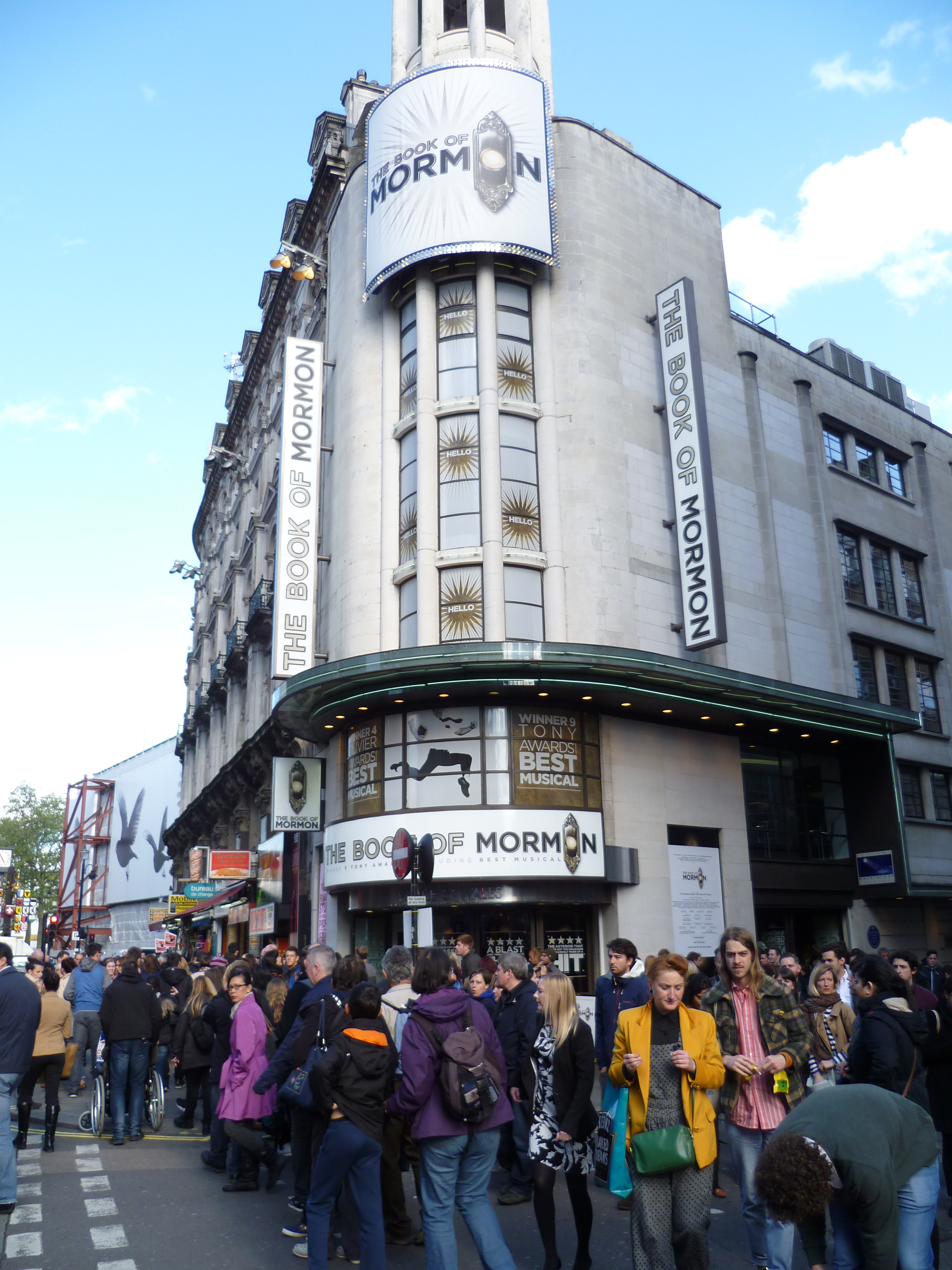
The Book of Mormon at The Prince of Wales Theatre in the West End in 2015

A West End production officially opened on March 21, 2013, at the Prince of Wales Theatre, with previews beginning February 25. Gavin Creel and Jared Gertner reprised their North American tour performances. The London cast members hosted a gala performance of the new musical on March 13, 2013, raising £200,000 for the British charity Comic Relief's Red Nose Day. A typical London performance runs two hours and 30 minutes, including an interval of 15 minutes. In March 2014, The Book of Mormon was voted Funniest West End Show as part of the 2014 West End Frame Awards. On July 28, 2014, both Creel and Gertner left the production. Creel left the West End production to return to the first national tour and was replaced by his standby, Billy Harrigan Tighe. Gertner was replaced by one of his standbys, A. J. Holmes, who had previously played Cunningham on both the national tour and Broadway.

After February 2, 2015, Broadway actor Nic Rouleau was cast in the role of Elder Kevin Price, replacing Billy Harrigan Tighe; Brian Sears, who also starred on Broadway (as an ensemble member), replaced A.J. Holmes as Elder Cunningham. Tighe and Holmes then joined the cast of the first national tour, filling the void left when Creel and O'Neill left the tour to play the leads on Broadway. On January 25, 2016, Rouleau announced via Twitter that January 30, 2016, would be his last performance as Elder Price in the West End. On February 1, 2016, longtime Broadway standby K.J. Hippensteel officially took over the role as Elder Price in the West End cast. On August 6, 2016, Stephen Ashfield had his last performance as Elder McKinley, as he was transferring over to the Broadway production. On August 9, 2016, Steven Webb took over for Ashfield as Elder McKinley. On January 14, 2017, Brian Sears performed his last performance in the West End. Sears left London to join the Broadway company on February 20. Sears was replaced by longtime second national tour Elder Cunningham, Cody Jamison Strand. Strand's first performance was on January 30, 2017, as he left the West End Company to rejoin the Broadway production. J.Michael Finley and Dom Simpson succeeded Strand and Hippensteel the following year, having both been standbys for their roles in the Broadway company, previously.

Tom Xander took over the role of Elder Cunningham in 2019, making Simpson and Xander the first British pair to lead the show worldwide.

The show suspended production in March 2020 due to the COVID-19 pandemic in the United Kingdom. It reopened on 15 November 2021 at the Prince of Wales Theatre, following a performance at West End LIVE in Trafalgar Square on 18 September 2021, with Simpson and Xander still leading.

=== Australia (2017–2020; 2025–present) ===
The original Australian production opened at Melbourne's Princess Theatre on January 18, 2017, where it broke box office records before it had even opened, and despite some controversy, won several Helpmann awards. The cast starred Ryan Bondy and A.J. Holmes as Elder Price and Elder Cunningham, Rowan Witt as Elder McKinley, Zahra Newman as Nabulungi, and Bert Labonté as Mafala. This same cast then opened at the Sydney Lyric on February 28, 2018, before the show toured to Brisbane, Adelaide, and Perth in 2019.

The show was scheduled to open in Auckland, New Zealand, at The Civic from 6 March to 26 April 2020. However, due to the impact of COVID-19, all performances from 17 March 2020 were cancelled.

A second Australian tour began in Sydney at the Capitol Theatre on July 15, 2025, before touring to Melbourne, Brisbane, Perth and Adelaide, starring Sean Johnston as Elder Price and Nick Cox as Elder Cunningham.

=== First UK and Ireland tour (2019–2022) ===
A UK and Ireland tour started on 6 June 2019 at the Palace Theatre, Manchester, with Kevin Clay as Elder Price and Conner Peirson as Elder Cunningham, but performances were cancelled from 16 March as a result of the COVID-19 pandemic and its impact on the performing arts.

The tour reopened on 12 October 2021 at the Donald Gordon Theatre, Cardiff and played its final performance on 26 November 2022 at the Theatre Royal, Glasgow.

=== US non-equity tour (2022–present) ===
A non-equity tour kicked off on September 23, 2022, at the Stanley Theatre in Utica, New York, starring Sam McLellan as Elder Price and Sam Nackman as Elder Cunningham.

=== Second UK and international tour (2024–2025) ===
A second UK and international tour started on September 11, 2024 at the Palace Theatre in Manchester and ended on December 21, 2025, at the Teatro degli Arcimboldi in Milan.

=== International productions ===
Over 20 million people have seen The Book of Mormon around the world. The first non-English version opened at the Chinateatern in Stockholm, Sweden, in January 2017. A Norwegian production opened at Det Norske Teatret in Oslo, Norway September 2017 to favorable reviews with demand crashing the ticketing website. The musical opened in Denmark at Copenhagen's Det Ny Teater in January 2018, as well as in Amsterdam, Netherlands on September 26, 2019. The show opened in Cologne, Germany on November 7, 2019, and played in Zurich, Switzerland in December 2019. In Aarhus, Denmark, the original Broadway production in English began on November 20, 2019, and ran until December 6. A Spanish non-replica production premiered at the Teatro Calderón in Madrid on October 10, 2023.

== Response ==
=== Critical reception ===
The Book of Mormon received broad critical praise for the plot, score, actors' performances, direction and choreography. Vogue called the show "the filthiest, most offensive, and—surprise—sweetest thing you'll see on Broadway this year, and quite possibly the funniest musical ever." New York Post reported that audience members were "sore from laughing so hard". It praised the score, calling it "tuneful and very funny," and added that "the show has heart. It makes fun of organized religion, but the two Mormons are real people, not caricatures."

Ben Brantley of The New York Times compared the show favorably to Rodgers and Hammerstein's The King and I and The Sound of Music, but "rather than dealing with tyrannical, charismatic men with way too many children, our heroes... must confront a one-eyed, genocidal warlord with an unprintable name... That's enough to test the faith of even the most optimistic gospel spreaders (not to mention songwriters). Yet in setting these dark elements to sunny melodies The Book of Mormon achieves something like a miracle. It both makes fun of and ardently embraces the all-American art form of the inspirational book musical. No Broadway show has so successfully had it both ways since Mel Brooks adapted his film The Producers for the stage a decade ago." Jon Stewart, host of The Daily Show, spent much of his interview with Parker and Stone on the March 10, 2011, episode praising the musical.

Charles McNulty of the Los Angeles Times praised the music, and stated: "The songs, often inspired lampoons of contemporary Broadway styles, are as catchy as they are clever." McNulty concluded by stating "Sure it's crass, but the show is not without good intentions and, in any case, vindicates itself with musical panache." Peter Marks of The Washington Post wrote: "The marvel of The Book of Mormon is that even as it profanes some serious articles of faith, its spirit is anything but mean. The ardently devout and comedically challenged are sure to disagree. Anyone else should excitedly approach the altar of Parker, Stone and Lopez and expect to drink from a cup of some of the sweetest poison ever poured." Marks further describes the musical as "one of the most joyously acidic bundles Broadway has unwrapped in years."

The Wall Street Journal's Terry Teachout called the show "slick and smutty: The Book of Mormon is the first musical to open on Broadway since La Cage aux Folles that has the smell of a send-in-the-tourists hit. The amateurish part relates mostly to the score, which is jointly credited to the three co-creators and is no better than what you might hear at a junior-varsity college show. The tunes are jingly-jangly, the lyrics embarrassingly ill-crafted." Other critics have called the show "crassly commercial" as well as "dull" and "derivative".

=== Accusations of racism and script revisions ===
The show's depiction of Africans has been called racist. NPR's Janice Simpson notes that "the show doesn't work unless the villagers are seen mainly as noble savages who need white people to show them the way to enlightenment." She further criticized the depiction of African doctors as well as the references to AIDS and female genital mutilation. Max Perry Mueller of Harvard writes that "The Book of Mormon producers worked so hard to get the 'Mormon thing' right, while completely ignoring the Ugandan culture". The Aid Leap blog noted that "the gleeful depiction of traditional stereotypes about Africa (dead babies, warlord, HIV, etc.) reinforced rather than challenged general preconceptions", and "the Africans are just a background to the emotional development of the Mormons".

In a retrospective interview published by Deseret News, Herb Scribner interviewed Cheryl Hystad, a retired attorney who had written an op-ed criticizing the musical in The Baltimore Sun, stated that "The fact that most reviewers have not mentioned the blatant racism in the show, points to a subtler issue, a pervasive anti-Africa bias to which white Americans have been inculcated so thoroughly that few seem to have concerns about the show's portrayal of Africans." Gad, speaking on PeopleTV's Couch Surfing with Lola Ogunnaike, in response to a potential film adaption of the play, had stated that "I don't know that that show could open today and have the same open-armed response that it did then. It's not to say that it's any less significant or wonderful or incredible a musical; I just think it's the nature of art to adapt."

In July 2020, four months after the show had closed due to the COVID-19 pandemic, and two months after the murder of George Floyd in Minneapolis, Black actors from the original and current casts signed a letter to the creative team warning that "when the show returns, all of our work will be viewed through a new lens." In response, the team collaborated with the New York cast at a two-week workshop in the summer of 2021, reviewing the intent, comic elements, and staging of each scene. The revised script aimed to give the villagers more agency and put them, not the missionaries, at the center of the work.

=== Latter-day Saint response ===
The response of the Church of Jesus Christ of Latter-day Saints to the musical has been described as "measured". The church released an official response to inquiries regarding the musical, stating, "The production may attempt to entertain audiences for an evening, but the Book of Mormon as a volume of scripture will change people's lives forever by bringing them closer to Christ." Michael Otterson, the head of Public Affairs for the church, followed in April 2011 with measured criticism. "Of course, parody isn't reality, and it's the very distortion that makes it appealing and often funny. The danger is not when people laugh but when they take it seriously—if they leave a theater believing that Mormons really do live in some kind of a surreal world of self-deception and illusion," Otterson wrote, outlining various humanitarian efforts achieved by Mormon missionaries in Africa since the early 2000s. Stone and Parker were unsurprised:

The official church response was something along the lines of "The Book of Mormon the musical might entertain you for a night, but the Book of Mormon,"—the book as scripture—"will change your life through Jesus." Which we actually completely agree with. The Mormon church's response to this musical is almost like our Q.E.D. at the end of it. That's a cool, American response to a ribbing—a big musical that's done in their name. Before the church responded, a lot of people would ask us, "Are you afraid of what the church would say?" And Trey and I were like, "They're going to be cool." And they were like, "No, they're not. There are going to be protests." And we were like, "Nope, they're going to be cool." We weren't that surprised by the church's response. We had faith in them.

The Church of Jesus Christ of Latter-day Saints has advertised in the playbills at many of the musical's venues to encourage attendees to learn more about the Book of Mormon, with phrases like "You've seen the play, now read the book" and "The book is always better."

In Melbourne, during the 2017 run, the Church advertised at Southern Cross railway station and elsewhere in the city, as well as on television with ads featuring prominent Australian Mormons, including rugby league player Will Hopoate, stage actor Patrice Tipoki and ballet dancer Jake Mangakahia.

Mormons themselves have had varying responses to the musical. Richard Bushman, professor of Mormon studies, said of the musical, "Mormons experience the show like looking at themselves in a fun-house mirror. The reflection is hilarious but not really you. The nose is yours but swollen out of proportion." Bushman said that the musical was not meant to explain Mormon belief, and that many of the ideas in Elder Price's "I Believe" (like God living on a planet called Kolob), though having some roots in Mormon belief, are not doctrinally accurate.

When asked in January 2015 if he had met Mormons who disliked the musical, Gad stated, "In the 1.5 years I did that show, I never got a single complaint from a practicing Mormon. To the contrary, I probably had a few people – a dozen – tell me they were so moved by the show that they took up the Mormon faith."

== Awards and honors ==
=== Broadway production ===
Year	Award	Category	Nominee	Result	Ref
2011	Tony Award	Best Musical		Won	
2011	Tony Award	Best Book of a Musical	Robert Lopez, Trey Parker and Matt Stone	Won	
2011	Tony Award	Best Original Score	Robert Lopez, Trey Parker and Matt Stone	Won	
2011	Tony Award	Best Actor in a Musical	Andrew Rannells	Nominated	
2011	Tony Award	Best Actor in a Musical	Josh Gad	Nominated	
2011	Tony Award	Best Featured Actor in a Musical	Rory O'Malley	Nominated	
2011	Tony Award	Best Featured Actress in a Musical	Nikki M. James	Won	
2011	Tony Award	Best Direction of a Musical	Casey Nicholaw and Trey Parker	Won	
2011	Tony Award	Best Choreography	Casey Nicholaw	Nominated	
2011	Tony Award	Best Orchestrations	Larry Hochman and Stephen Oremus	Won	
2011	Tony Award	Best Scenic Design	Scott Pask	Won	
2011	Tony Award	Best Costume Design	Ann Roth	Nominated	
2011	Tony Award	Best Lighting Design	Brian MacDevitt	Won	
2011	Tony Award	Best Sound Design	Brian Ronan	Won	
2011	Drama Desk Award	Outstanding Musical		Won	
2011	Drama Desk Award	Outstanding Lyrics	Robert Lopez, Trey Parker, and Matt Stone	Won	
2011	Drama Desk Award	Outstanding Music	Robert Lopez, Trey Parker, and Matt Stone	Won	
2011	Drama Desk Award	Outstanding Book of a Musical	Robert Lopez, Trey Parker, and Matt Stone	Nominated	
2011	Drama Desk Award	Outstanding Actor in a Musical	Andrew Rannells	Nominated	
2011	Drama Desk Award	Outstanding Featured Actor in a Musical	Rory O'Malley	Nominated	
2011	Drama Desk Award	Outstanding Featured Actress in a Musical	Nikki M. James	Nominated	
2011	Drama Desk Award	Outstanding Choreography	Casey Nicholaw	Nominated	
2011	Drama Desk Award	Outstanding Director of a Musical	Casey Nicholaw and Trey Parker	Won	
2011	Drama Desk Award	Outstanding Costume Design	Ann Roth	Nominated	
2011	Drama Desk Award	Outstanding Sound Design of a Musical	Brian Ronan	Nominated	
2011	Drama Desk Award	Outstanding Orchestrations	Larry Hochman and Stephen Oremus	Won	
2011	Outer Critics Circle Award	Outstanding New Broadway Musical		Won	
2011	Outer Critics Circle Award	Outstanding New Score	Trey Parker, Robert Lopez and Matt Stone	Won	
2011	Outer Critics Circle Award	Outstanding Director of a Musical	Casey Nicholaw and Trey Parker	Won	
2011	Outer Critics Circle Award	Outstanding Choreographer	Casey Nicholaw	Nominated	
2011	Outer Critics Circle Award	Outstanding Actor in a Musical	Josh Gad	Won	
2011	Outer Critics Circle Award	Outstanding Actress in a Musical	Nikki M. James	Nominated	
2011	New York Drama Critics' Circle Award	Best Musical		Won	
2012	Grammy Award	Best Musical Theater Album		Won	

=== London production ===
Year	Award	Category	Nominee	Result	Ref
2014	Laurence Olivier Award	Best New Musical		Won	
2014	Laurence Olivier Award	Best Actor in a Musical	Gavin Creel	Won	
2014	Laurence Olivier Award	Best Actor in a Musical	Jared Gertner	Nominated	
2014	Laurence Olivier Award	Best Performance in a Supporting Role in a Musical	Stephen Ashfield	Won	
2014	Laurence Olivier Award	Best Theatre Choreographer	Casey Nicholaw	Won	
2014	Laurence Olivier Award	Outstanding Achievement in Music	Robert Lopez, Trey Parker, & Matt Stone	Nominated	

=== Melbourne production ===
Year	Award	Category	Nominee	Result
2017	Helpmann Awards	Best Musical		Won
2017	Helpmann Awards	Best Choreography of a Musical	Casey Nicholaw	Nominated
2017	Helpmann Awards	Best Direction of a Musical	Casey Nicholaw & Trey Parker	Won
2017	Helpmann Awards	Best Female Actor in a Musical	Zahra Newman	Nominated
2017	Helpmann Awards	Best Male Actor in a Musical	AJ Holmes	Nominated
2017	Helpmann Awards	Best Male Actor in a Supporting Role in a Musical	Bert LaBonte	Nominated
2017	Helpmann Awards	Best Male Actor in a Supporting Role in a Musical	Rowan Witt	Nominated
2017	Helpmann Awards	Best Original Score	Trey Parker, Matt Stone & Robert Lopez	Nominated

== Recordings ==
=== Original Broadway cast recording ===
A cast recording of the original Broadway production was released on May 17, 2011, by Ghostlight Records. All of the songs featured on stage are present on the recording with the exception of "I Am Here For You" (Reprise), "Hasa Diga Eebowai" (Reprise) and "You and Me (But Mostly Me)" (Reprise). "Hello" (Reprise) and the "Encore" are attached to the end of the last track of the CD, titled, "Tomorrow Is a Latter Day". A free preview of the entire recording was released on NPR starting on May 9, 2011. Excerpts from the cast recording are featured in an extended Fresh Air interview.

During its first week of its iTunes Store release, the recording became "the fastest-selling Broadway cast album in iTunes history," according to representatives for the production, ranking No. 2 on its day of release on the iTunes Top 10 Chart. According to Playbill, "It's a rare occurrence for a Broadway cast album to place among the iTunes best sellers." The record has received positive reviews, with Rolling Stone calling the recording an "outstanding album that highlights the wit of the lyrics and the incredible tunefulness of the songs while leaving you desperate to score tickets to see the actual show." Although the cast album had a respectable debut on the US Billboard 200 chart in its initial week of release, after the show's success at the 2011 Tony Awards, the record rapidly ascended the chart to number three, making it the highest-charting Broadway cast album in over four decades.

A vinyl version was released on May 19, 2017.

== See also ==
- The Church of Jesus Christ of Latter-day Saints in Uganda
- Latter Day Saints in popular culture
- "Broadway Bro Down"
