= Don't Dress for Dinner =

Adaptation of the French play Pyjama Pour Six

- Original language: French
- Written by: Robin Hawdon, Marc Camoletti

Premiere
- Date: 1987
- Place: Paris

Don't Dress for Dinner is an adaptation of a two-act play titled Pyjama Pour Six by French playwright Marc Camoletti, who wrote Boeing-Boeing. It ran in London for six years and opened on Broadway in 2012.

== Productions ==
After a successful run of Pyjama Pour Six in Paris, the English speaking rights were purchased by London producer Mark Furness who commissioned playwright Robin Hawdon to adapt the play for English speaking audiences. The English version opened in the West End at the Apollo Theatre in March 1991, directed by Peter Farago and starring Simon Cadell as Robert, Su Pollard as Suzette, Jane How as Jaqueline, and John Quayle as Bernard. The reviewer for The Guardian wrote: "Hurtling along at the speed of light, Marc Camoletti's breathtaking farce is a near faultless piece of theatrical invention. Within seconds we are drawn into a delicious web of marital treachery which accelerates with classic symmetry to an all-star denouement... Originally staged in Paris where it ran for two years, the English version has been adapted by Robin Hawdon and retains a distinctly Gallic note, heightening a sense of dramatic artifice while pandering to the chauvinism that makes the French mistress intrinsically funnier than an English girlfriend." The play transferred to the Duchess Theatre and ran for a total of six years. This version has since played in theatres all over America and the English speaking world. The play was famously featured as the basis for a hidden camera prank on Lionel Blair on the television series Noel's House Party.

The play ran at the Paper Mill Playhouse, Millburn, New Jersey, in January 1993 to February 7, 1993. The reviewer for The New York Times wrote: " 'Don't Dress for Dinner' does not mirror human folly in the manner of true farce, but, rather, extols pretense and infidelity, validates multiple duplicity and provides a very wearying evening in the theater." Don't Dress for Dinner was produced at the Royal George Theatre, Chicago, Illinois in November 2008 to January 2009, with direction by John Tillinger and featuring Patricia Kalember and Spencer Kayden. The reviewer for the Chicago Tribune wrote: "To say it tickles that much-neglected, much-necessary, semimythical, recession-challenged appendage is not to do the show justice. It gives it a series of rib-rousing strokes."

The play opened on Broadway at the American Airlines Theatre in a limited run, with previews starting on March 30, 2012, and officially on April 26, 2012, and scheduled to close on June 17, 2012. This production of the Roundabout Theatre is directed by John Tillinger, and features Ben Daniels, Patricia Kalember, Adam James, Jennifer Tilly, David Aron Damane, and Spencer Kayden. The New York Times reviewer wrote: " 'Don’t Dress for Dinner' is arguably a better-constructed farce than 'Boeing-Boeing,' but this show, directed by John Tillinger, lacks crucial elements that made the earlier revival, directed by Matthew Warchus, so popular: the particular genius of Mr. [Mark] Rylance, whose clowning was gently infused with real pathos, as well as stylish designs and the 'Mad Men'-era kitsch factor provided by the presence of sex-kitten stewardesses... Subtlety is not a requirement — or even an asset — when playing farce, and the cast of 'Don’t Dress for Dinner' certainly makes no attempt to underplay... The verbal wit in the English adaptation by Robin Hawdon is rather low... But most of the humor derives from the bawdy grappling among the various romantic partners and the slinky manner in which Suzette crisply outfoxes her betters." Theatre review aggregator Curtain Critic gave the Broadway production a score of 46 out of 100 based on the opinions of 16 critics.

== Characters ==
- Bernard - Jacqueline's husband and Suzanne's lover
- Jacqueline - Bernard's wife and Robert's lover
- Robert - Bernard's friend and Jacqueline's lover
- Suzette - the cook
- Suzanne - Bernard's mistress
- George - Suzette's husband

== Synopsis ==
Act 1

In a renovated French farmhouse about a two-hour drive from Paris, Bernard is hoping to send his wife, Jacqueline, to her mother's for the weekend, in hopes he can romance his mistress, Suzanne, a Parisian model. Bernard has hired a Cordon Bleu cook, Suzette, and as an alibi invited his friend Robert to dinner.

While Bernard is upstairs, the telephone rings. Jacqueline answers; it's the Bon Appetit catering agency confirming Suzette is on her way, which alerts her that something is up. Then Robert calls and Jacqueline again answers. He tells Jacqueline he is spending the weekend, a fact unknown to her. As Robert and Jacqueline talk on the phone, it becomes obvious that they are having an affair.

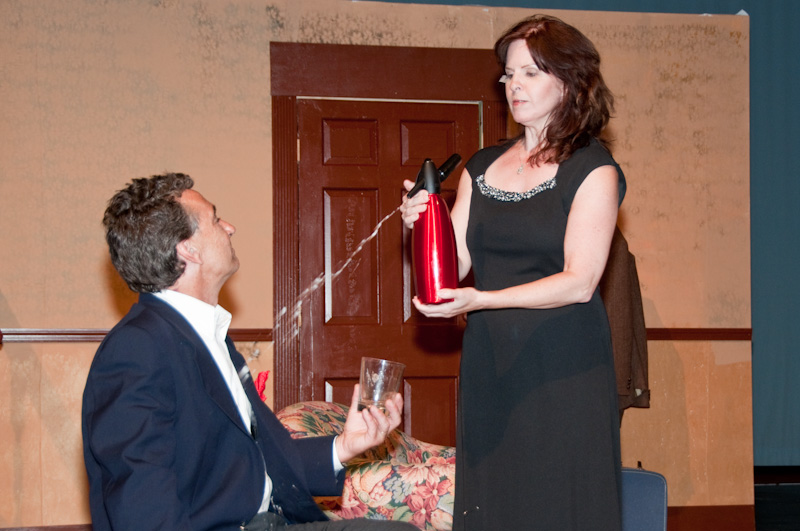
Jacqueline (Tina Segovia) splashes Bernard (Joe Kelly) with soda in the 2009 Potomac Theatre Company production of the play.

Jacqueline tells Bernard her mother has the flu and that she has cancelled their visit. Bernard panics, and when Robert arrives, he tells his friend about his affair with Suzanne. Since Suzanne is arriving at any minute, Bernard commands Robert against his will to tell Jacqueline that "Suzy" is his girlfriend.

While Bernard and Jacqueline are out buying groceries, Suzy arrives but it is Suzette, the caterer, not Suzanne, the mistress. Robert doesn't realize, and introduces Suzette as his girlfriend when Bernard and Jacqueline return. Bernard is furious because of the mix-up, and Jacqueline feels betrayed because she thought she was Robert's only mistress.

Bernard and Robert secretly talk to Suzette, and for extra money she agrees to play Robert's mistress. Finally, Suzanne arrives and although alerted to and outraged at the fact that she now has to act as the cook, decides she has no option but to play her part in the deception. When Jacqueline eventually confronts Robert about Suzette, he avoids disaster by telling Jacqueline that Suzette is really his niece.

Act 2

Robert and Suzette are dancing drunkenly in and out of the room. When they have gone Jacqueline voices her frustration at Bernard's affair, which she discovered because of a note signed 'Suzy' and a receipt for a Chanel coat in Bernard's jacket pocket. The coat was a gift for Bernard's mistress. Since the coat was passed off as Suzette's, Jacqueline is sure Bernard's affair is with Suzette.

Suzanne thinks so as well; she and Jacqueline exact revenge on Robert and Suzette by pouring ice on them. Suzanne was satisfied but Jacqueline sprays Bernard with a soda siphon. More hijinks are brought out and confusion about Suzette being Robert's niece is brought to light.

Suzette tells Bernard and Robert that she has a husband, George, who will kill anyone she is seen even suggesting an affair. Jacqueline comes downstairs in a negligee and tells Bernard about her affair. Bernard is mad and threatens to kill the adulterer. Jacqueline discloses Robert's name and all is set for hell when George, Suzette's husband, walks in. George is told to believe Suzette is at another house and that Suzanne is his wife, until Suzette comes out to greet him. After questioning George believes the evening was a game called "Happy Families" and they depart.

After Bernard and Jacqueline go to bed, Suzanne visits Robert's bedroom, claims they should share it and that he deserves a reward for buying her a new Chanel coat (because Suzette took the old one).

== Casting history ==
The principal casts of notable productions of Don't Dress for Dinner

| Character | West End | New Zealand | Paper Mill Playhouse | Chicago | Broadway | South Africa |
| Character | 1991 | 1993 | 1993 | 2008 | 2012 | 2012 |
|---|---|---|---|---|---|---|
| Bernard | John Quayle | John Quayle | Simon Jones | Mark Harelik | Adam James | James Cuningham |
| Jacqueline "Jackie" | Jane How | Kim Hartman | Alexandra O'Karma | Patricia Kalember | Patricia Kalember | Natasha Sutherland |
| Robert | Simon Cadell | Karl Howman | Reno Roop | Jeffrey Donovan | Ben Daniels | Robert Fridjhon |
| Suzette | Su Pollard | Su Pollard | Patricia Conolly | Jamie Morgan | Spencer Kayden | Janna Ramos-Violante |
| Suzanne | Briony Glassco | Mandy Perryment | Caroline Lagerfelt | Spencer Kayden | Jennifer Tilly | Emily Child |
| George | Dougal Lee | Leslie Mills | Timothy Wheeler | Chris Sullivan | David Aron Damane | Nhlakanipho Manqele |

=== Notable cast replacements ===
West End
- Jacqueline "Jackie": Kim Hartman
