= Jared Gertner =

American actor

- Born: Jared Gertner; December 27
- Occupation: Actor
- Years active: 2008–present
- Spouse: Jeffrey Marshek Gertner (m. 2010)
- Children: 1

Jared Gertner is an American actor best known for his work in the American musical theater, including a co-starring role in the first touring and London productions of The Book of Mormon.

== Life and career ==
Gertner was raised in Toms River, New Jersey in a Conservative Jewish family. His first acting work was at a theater operated by his aunt and uncle, where he debuted at age six as a Lost Boy in a production of Peter Pan. He earned a Bachelor of Fine Arts degree in drama at New York's Tisch School of the Arts.

Gertner's subsequent roles have included William Barfee in the San Francisco and Boston productions of The 25th Annual Putnam County Spelling Bee. After winning an IRNE Award (Independent Reviewers of New England) for Best Actor, he replaced Dan Fogler in the New York production. (Fogler had won a Tony in the role.) Gertner played Warren in Ordinary Days with New York's Roundabout Theatre Company and performed on the original cast recording. His other stage roles include Eubie the Happy Elf in the world premiere of Harry Connick Jr.'s The Happy Elf, Elliot in the world premier of Band Geeks with the Goodspeed Musicals company, and an improvisational role in Don't Quit Your Night Job. Gertner's television roles include guest appearances on Ugly Betty, How I Met Your Mother and The Good Wife.

Gertner was the understudy for Josh Gad in the role of Arnold Cunningham in the musical The Book of Mormon. With Gad's departure, Gertner took over the role on Broadway, then co-starred with Gavin Creel in the production's first national tour, debuting in August 2012 in Denver. Gertner also co-starred with Creel in the London West End production of The Book of Mormon, which began previews on February 25, 2013. In August 2024, he portrayed Ogie in the Wells Fargo Pavilion production of Waitress.

== Personal life ==
Gertner is openly gay and married to his husband Jeffrey. They have a son.

== Filmography ==
=== Film ===
Year	Title	Role	Notes
2008	Between Love and Goodbye	Ben	film debut

=== Television ===
Year	Title	Role	Notes
2009	Ugly Betty	Man #1	Episode: "Plus None"
2010	The Good Wife	Pym Gabriel	Episode: "Boom"
2011-14	Submissions Only	Randall Moody	Regular (web series)
2012	How I Met Your Mother	Irving	Episode: "The Stamp Tramp"
2015	Agent Carter	Cryptographer	Episode: "The Iron Ceiling"
2015	Supernatural	Len	Episode: "Thin Lizzie"
2017	2 Broke Girls	Marcel	Episode: "And the Turtle Sense"
2017	Modern Family	Bobby	Episode: "Heavy Is the Head"
2021	Side Hustle	Earl	Episode: "A Mouth Noise Christmas"
