= Samantha Marie Ware =

American actress and singer

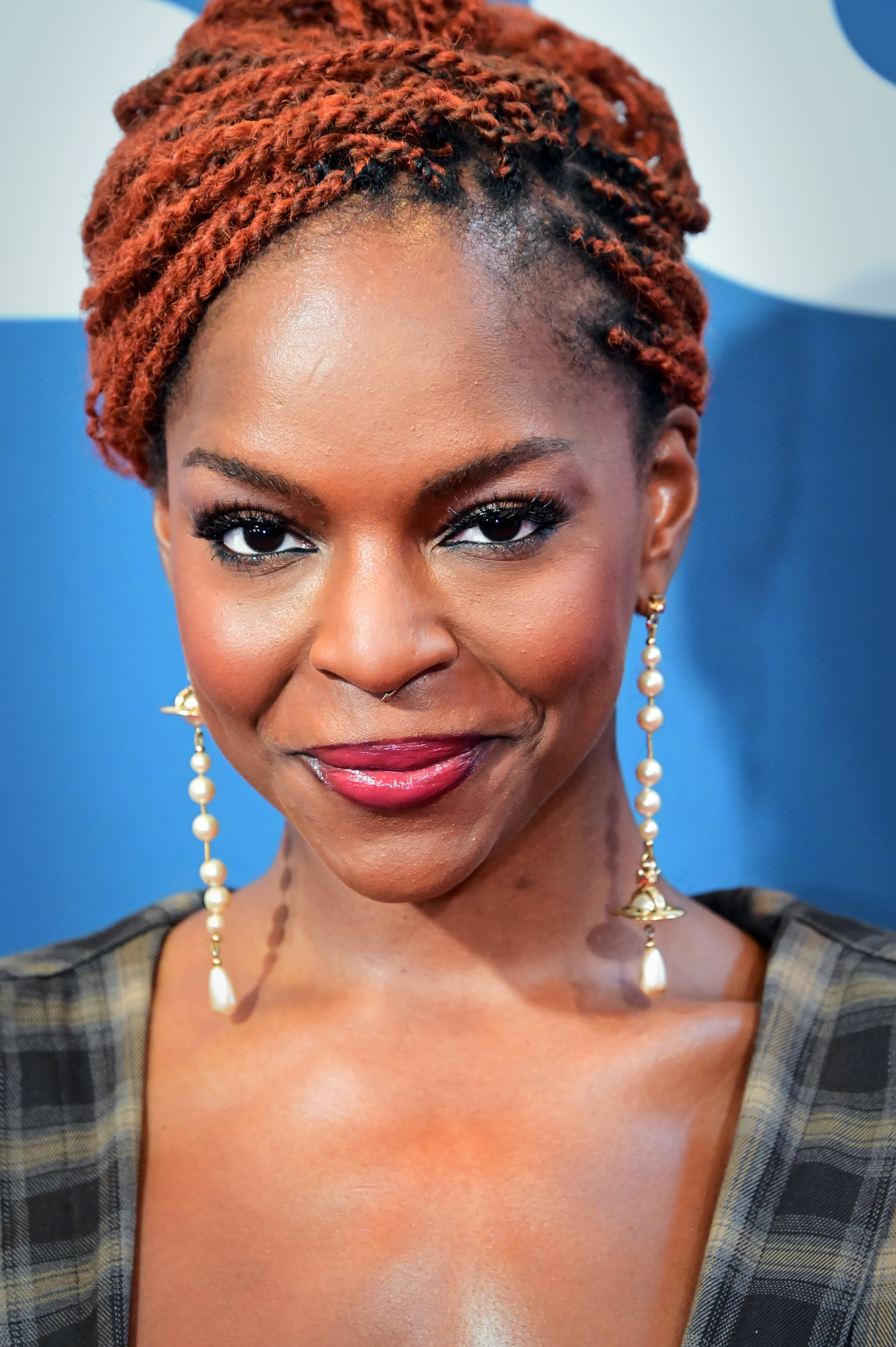
- Ware in 2026
- Born: Samantha Marie Ware; September 4, 1991 (age 34); Lincoln, Nebraska, U.S.
- Other name: Sameya
- Education: Doane University
- Occupations: Actress; singer
- Notable work: Glee

Samantha Marie Ware (born September 3, 1991), also known by her singer stage name Sameya, is an American actress and singer. She is best known for portraying Jane Hayward in the sixth season of Glee (2015), as well as Angela Archer in the Netflix series What/If (2019). Ware also played Lily in the Nike web series Margot vs. Lily (2016).

== Early life and career ==
Hailing from Lincoln, Nebraska, Ware started her acting career while attending Doane University at the age of 19. She started acting in theater productions, being cast in a Las Vegas production of The Lion King as Nala and later in 2012 national tour for The Book of Mormon, for which she won the Helen Hayes Award for Outstanding Supporting Performer. She was subsequently cast in major roles on the TV series Glee and What/If. She also played Peggy Schuyler and Maria Reynolds in the Chicago production of Hamilton.

== Personal life ==
In June 2020, Ware accused Glee series main cast member Lea Michele, with whom she worked in late 2014 during Ware's recurring role in the sixth season of the series, of being very rude to her on set, behaving with "traumatic microaggressions". Ware made her comments in direct response to Michele having posted a message on social media saying "George Floyd did not deserve this. This was not an isolated incident and it must end. #BlackLives Matter", though she did not specifically state that Michele's rude behavior towards new actors with minor roles was akin to the racism involved in the murder of George Floyd.

Two other actors who co-starred with Michele in the main cast, Heather Morris and Amber Riley, made statements confirming that Michele could be frustratingly rude to everyone on set, but neither saw any link between her wide-ranging rudeness and the implication of Michele being racist. Michele responded with an apology, noting that the comments from numerous cast members in response to Ware's accusation had made her aware that her general treatment of all cast members during those years was "insensitive or inappropriate", a sign of "immaturity", understood that she was "unnecessarily difficult" towards others around her, and she would "keep working to better myself and take responsibility for my actions."

== Filmography ==
=== Film and television ===
Year	Film	Role	Notes
2015	Glee	Jane Hayward	Recurring role (season 6)
2016	Margot vs. Lily	Lily	Main role
2016	Barry	Tisha	Film
2017	Chicago Med	Julia	Episode: "Lose Yourself"
2017	Bull	Lacey Adams	Episode: "No Good Deed"
2018	NCIS: New Orleans	Josie Hill	Episode: "Ties That Bind"
2019	What/If	Angela Archer	Main role
2019	God Friended Me	Claire Thompson	Episode: "The Greater Good"
2020–2021	Doom Patrol	Miranda	4 episodes
2020–2023	All Rise	Vanessa “Ness” Johnson	Recurring role (season 2–3)
2024	24-Karat Christmas	Trish Moore	Main Character
2025–2026	Grey's Anatomy	Katie Rogers	Recurring role
