= List of songs in Glee season 6 =

Glee is an American musical comedy-drama television series produced by Fox. It focuses on the glee club New Directions, at the fictional William McKinley High School in Lima, Ohio. The show was created by Ryan Murphy, Brad Falchuk and Ian Brennan, and features many cover versions of songs sung on-screen by the characters. Murphy is responsible for selecting all of the songs used, and strives to maintain a balance between show tunes and chart hits, as he wants there to be "something for everybody in every episode." Once Murphy selects a song, rights are cleared with its publishers by music supervisor P.J. Bloom, and music producer Adam Anders arranges it for the Glee cast. Numbers are pre-recorded by the cast; studio recordings of tracks are then made. The process begins six to eight weeks before each episode is filmed, and can end as late as the day before filming begins. The list below contains all 73 musical performances of the sixth season, with each performance delivering an individual song or a mashup of two or more songs in a single performance.

== Songs ==
List of songs in Glee season six
Title	Version covered	Performed by	Episode	Single	Album	Ref.
"Uninvited"	Alanis Morissette	Rachel Berry	1. "Loser Like Me"	Yes	Loser Like Me	
"Suddenly Seymour"	Little Shop of Horrors	Blaine Anderson and Rachel Berry	1. "Loser Like Me"	Yes	Loser Like Me	
"Sing"	Ed Sheeran	Skylar, Blaine Anderson and Dalton Academy Warblers	1. "Loser Like Me"	Yes	Loser Like Me	
"Dance the Night Away"	Van Halen	Clint and Vocal Adrenaline	1. "Loser Like Me"	Yes	Loser Like Me	
"Let It Go"	Idina Menzel	Rachel Berry	1. "Loser Like Me"	Yes	Loser Like Me	
"Viva Voce"	The Rocketboys	Roderick	2. "Homecoming"	No	No	
"Take On Me"	A-ha	New Directions alumni	2. "Homecoming"	Yes	Homecoming	
"Tightrope"	Janelle Monáe feat. Big Boi	Jane Hayward with Dalton Academy Warblers	2. "Homecoming"	Yes	Homecoming	
"Problem"	Ariana Grande feat. Iggy Azalea	Quinn Fabray, Brittany Pierce and Santana Lopez with Artie Abrams and McKinley High Cheerios	2. "Homecoming"	Yes	Homecoming	
"Mustang Sally"	Wilson Pickett	Roderick with Quinn Fabray, Santana Lopez and Brittany Pierce	2. "Homecoming"	Yes	Homecoming	
"Home"	Edward Sharpe and the Magnetic Zeros	New Directions alumni, New Directions and Spencer Porter	2. "Homecoming"	Yes	Homecoming	
"It's Too Late"	Carole King	Kurt Hummel and Blaine Anderson	3. "Jagged Little Tapestry"	Yes	Jagged Little Tapestry	
"Hand in My Pocket" / "I Feel the Earth Move"	Alanis Morissette / Carole King	Santana Lopez and Brittany Pierce	3. "Jagged Little Tapestry"	Yes	Jagged Little Tapestry	
"Will You Love Me Tomorrow" / "Head over Feet"	Carole King / Alanis Morissette	Jane Hayward and Mason McCarthy	3. "Jagged Little Tapestry"	Yes	Jagged Little Tapestry	
"So Far Away"	Carole King	Quinn Fabray and Tina Cohen-Chang	3. "Jagged Little Tapestry"	Yes	Jagged Little Tapestry	
"You Learn" / "You've Got a Friend"	Alanis Morissette / Carole King	Rachel Berry, Santana Lopez, Brittany Pierce, Kurt Hummel, Tina Cohen-Chang and Quinn Fabray with Noah Puckerman and New Directions	3. "Jagged Little Tapestry"	Yes	Jagged Little Tapestry	
"Bitch"	Meredith Brooks	Sue Sylvester	4. "The Hurt Locker, Part One"	Yes	The Hurt Locker	
"A Thousand Miles"	Vanessa Carlton	Rachel Berry and Sam Evans	4. "The Hurt Locker, Part One"	Yes	The Hurt Locker	
"Rock Lobster"	The B-52's	Clint and Vocal Adrenaline	4. "The Hurt Locker, Part One"	Yes	The Hurt Locker	
"Whip It"	Devo	Clint and Vocal Adrenaline	4. "The Hurt Locker, Part One"	Yes	The Hurt Locker	
"My Sharona"	The Knack	Skylar and Dalton Academy Warblers	5. "The Hurt Locker, Part Two"	Yes	The Hurt Locker, Part 2	
"You Spin Me Round (Like a Record)"	Dead or Alive	Skylar and Dalton Academy Warblers	5. "The Hurt Locker, Part Two"	Yes	The Hurt Locker, Part 2	
"It Must Have Been Love"	Roxette	Kitty Wilde and Spencer Porter with New Directions	5. "The Hurt Locker, Part Two"	Yes	The Hurt Locker, Part 2	
"Father Figure"	George Michael	Roderick with New Directions	5. "The Hurt Locker, Part Two"	Yes	The Hurt Locker, Part 2	
"All Out of Love"	Air Supply	Mason McCarthy, Madison McCarthy, and Jane Hayward with New Directions	5. "The Hurt Locker, Part Two"	Yes	The Hurt Locker, Part 2	
"I'll Never Fall in Love Again"	Dionne Warwick	Rachel Berry and Sam Evans	6. "What the World Needs Now"	Yes	What the World Needs Now Is Love	
"Baby It's You"	The Shirelles	Mercedes Jones with Rachel Berry, Santana Lopez and Brittany Pierce	6. "What the World Needs Now"	Yes	What the World Needs Now Is Love	
"Wishin' and Hopin'"	Dusty Springfield	Brittany Pierce, Artie Abrams, Blaine Anderson and Sam Evans with angel choir	6. "What the World Needs Now"	Yes	What the World Needs Now Is Love	
"Arthur's Theme (Best That You Can Do)"	Christopher Cross	Blaine Anderson, Artie Abrams and New Directions males with Sam Evans and Kurt Hummel	6. "What the World Needs Now"	Yes	What the World Needs Now Is Love	
"(They Long to Be) Close to You"	The Carpenters	Sam Evans	6. "What the World Needs Now"	Yes	What the World Needs Now Is Love	
"Promises, Promises"	Promises, Promises	Rachel Berry	6. "What the World Needs Now"	Yes	What the World Needs Now Is Love	
"Alfie"	Cilla Black	Santana Lopez with New Directions and alumni	6. "What the World Needs Now"	Yes	What the World Needs Now Is Love	
"What the World Needs Now"	Jackie DeShannon	Mercedes Jones, Rachel Berry, Artie Abrams, Kurt Hummel, Will Schuester and Sam Evans with New Directions and alumni	6. "What the World Needs Now"	Yes	What the World Needs Now Is Love	
"You Give Love a Bad Name"	Bon Jovi	Clint and Vocal Adrenaline	7. "Transitioning"	Yes	Transitioning	
"Same Love"	Macklemore & Ryan Lewis feat. Mary Lambert	Will Schuester and Unique Adams	7. "Transitioning"	Yes	Transitioning	
"All About That Bass"	Meghan Trainor	Mercedes Jones and Roderick	7. "Transitioning"	Yes	Transitioning	
"Somebody Loves You"	Betty Who	Blaine Anderson and Kurt Hummel	7. "Transitioning"	Yes	Transitioning	
"Time After Time"	Cyndi Lauper	Rachel Berry and Sam Evans	7. "Transitioning"	Yes	Transitioning	
"I Know Where I've Been"	Hairspray	Unique Adams with transgender choir and Sheldon Beiste	7. "Transitioning"	Yes	Transitioning	
"At Last"	Etta James	Mercedes Jones and Artie Abrams	8. "A Wedding"	Yes	A Wedding	
"Hey Ya!"	OutKast	Artie Abrams with Jane Hayward, Madison McCarthy and the wedding guests	8. "A Wedding"	Yes	A Wedding	
"I'm So Excited"	The Pointer Sisters	Maribel Lopez, Whitney Pierce, Carole Hudson-Hummel, Pam Anderson and the Troubletones	8. "A Wedding"	Yes	A Wedding	
"Our Day Will Come"	Ruby & the Romantics	Santana Lopez, Brittany Pierce, Blaine Anderson and Kurt Hummel	8. "A Wedding"	Yes	A Wedding	
"Lose My Breath"	Destiny's Child	Myron Muskovitz with female backup dancers	9. "Child Star"	Yes	Child Star	
"Friday I'm in Love"	The Cure	Spencer Porter with New Directions	9. "Child Star"	Yes	Child Star	
"I Want to Break Free"	Queen	Mason McCarthy	9. "Child Star"	Yes	Child Star	
"Uptown Funk"	Mark Ronson feat. Bruno Mars	Jane Hayward, Spencer Porter and Roderick with New Directions	9. "Child Star"	Yes	Child Star	
"Break Free"	Ariana Grande feat. Zedd	Rachel Berry, Myron Muskovitz, Sheldon Beiste, Will Schuester, Sue Sylvester, Sam Evans and New Directions	9. "Child Star"	Yes	Child Star	
"Cool Kids"	Echosmith	New Directions	9. "Child Star"	Yes	Child Star	
"Rather Be"	Clean Bandit feat. Jess Glynne	New Directions	10. "The Rise and Fall of Sue Sylvester"	Yes	The Rise and Fall of Sue Sylvester	
"The Trolley Song"	Judy Garland	Sue Sylvester and Doris Sylvester	10. "The Rise and Fall of Sue Sylvester"	Yes	The Rise and Fall of Sue Sylvester	
"Far from Over"	Frank Stallone	Clint and Vocal Adrenaline	10. "The Rise and Fall of Sue Sylvester"	Yes	The Rise and Fall of Sue Sylvester	
"The Final Countdown"	Europe	Sue Sylvester and Will Schuester	10. "The Rise and Fall of Sue Sylvester"	Yes	The Rise and Fall of Sue Sylvester	
"Rise"	Original composition by Darren Criss	New Directions	10. "The Rise and Fall of Sue Sylvester"	Yes	The Rise and Fall of Sue Sylvester	
"Listen to Your Heart"	Roxette	Rachel Berry and Jesse St. James	11. "We Built This Glee Club"	Yes	We Built This Glee Club	
"Broken Wings"	Mr. Mister	The Falconers	11. "We Built This Glee Club"	No	No	
"We Built This City"	Starship	Clint and Vocal Adrenaline	11. "We Built This Glee Club"	Yes	We Built This Glee Club	
"Mickey"	Toni Basil	Clint and Vocal Adrenaline	11. "We Built This Glee Club"	Yes	We Built This Glee Club	
"Take Me to Church"	Hozier	Roderick with Kitty Wilde, Skylar, Jane Hayward and New Directions	11. "We Built This Glee Club"	Yes	We Built This Glee Club	
"Chandelier"	Sia	Madison McCarthy with Kitty Wilde, Jane Hayward and New Directions	11. "We Built This Glee Club"	Yes	We Built This Glee Club	
"Come Sail Away"	Styx	Mason McCarthy with Madison McCarthy, Spencer Porter, Kitty Wilde and New Directions	11. "We Built This Glee Club"	Yes	We Built This Glee Club	
"Popular"	Wicked	Rachel Berry and Kurt Hummel	12. "2009"	Yes	2009	
"Mister Cellophane"	Chicago	Kurt Hummel	12. "2009"	No	No	
"I'm His Child"	Zella Jackson Price	Mercedes Jones with church choir	12. "2009"	Yes	2009	
"I Kissed a Girl"	Katy Perry	Tina Cohen-Chang	12. "2009"	Yes	2009	
"Pony"	Ginuwine	Artie Abrams	12. "2009"	Yes	2009	
"Don't Stop Believin'"	Journey	New Directions	12. "2009"	Yes	2009	
"Teach Your Children"	Crosby, Stills, Nash & Young	Will Schuester	13. "Dreams Come True"	Yes	Dreams Come True	
"Someday We'll Be Together"	Diana Ross & the Supremes	Mercedes Jones with gospel choir	13. "Dreams Come True"	Yes	Dreams Come True	
"The Winner Takes It All"	ABBA	Sue Sylvester and Will Schuester	13. "Dreams Come True"	Yes	Dreams Come True	
"Daydream Believer"	The Monkees	Kurt Hummel and Blaine Anderson with schoolchildren	13. "Dreams Come True"	Yes	Dreams Come True	
"This Time"	Darren Criss	Rachel Berry	13. "Dreams Come True"	Yes	Dreams Come True	
"I Lived"	OneRepublic	List of performers: Will Schuester, Sam Evans, Artie Abrams, Rachel Berry, Roderick, Mercedes Jones, Blaine Anderson and Kurt Hummel with Unique Adams, Alistair, Sheldon Beiste, Mike Chang, Tina Cohen-Chang, Terri Del Monico, Quinn Fabray, Principal Figgins, Joe Hart, Jane Hayward, Carole Hudson-Hummel, Burt Hummel, Becky Jackson, Dave Karofsky, Santana Lopez, Ryder Lynn, Madison McCarthy, Mason McCarthy, Sugar Motta, Brittany Pierce, Emma Pillsbury-Schuester, Spencer Porter, Jake Puckerman, Noah Puckerman, Matt Rutherford, Jesse St. James, Sue Sylvester, Kitty Wilde and Lauren Zizes	13. "Dreams Come True"	Yes	Dreams Come True	

== See also ==
- List of songs in Glee (season 1)
- List of songs in Glee (season 2)
- List of songs in Glee (season 3)
- List of songs in Glee (season 4)
- List of songs in Glee (season 5)
- Glee albums discography
