= Child Star (Glee) =

- Glee episode
- Episode no.: Season 6 Episode 9
- Directed by: Michael Hitchcock
- Written by: Ned Martel
- Production code: 6ARC10
- Original air date: February 27, 2015

Guest appearances
- Becca Tobin as Kitty Wilde; Josie Totah (Note: Credited as J.J. Totah.) as Myron Muskovitz; Finneas O'Connell as Alistair; Christopher Cousins as Superintendent Bob Harris; Noah Guthrie as Roderick Meeks; Samantha Marie Ware as Jane Hayward; Marshall Williams as Spencer Porter; Billy Lewis Jr. as Mason McCarthy; Laura Dreyfuss as Madison McCarthy

Episode chronology
← Previous "A Wedding"	Next → "The Rise and Fall of Sue Sylvester"
- Glee season 6

"Child Star" is the ninth episode of the sixth season of the American musical television series Glee, and the 117th overall. The episode was written by Ned Martel, directed by co-executive producer Michael Hitchcock, and first aired on February 27, 2015 on Fox in the United States.

The episode takes place as New Directions are hired by a young boy to perform at his bar mitzvah party, but he turns out to cause all sorts of problems. Meanwhile, Mason McCarthy is developing feelings for Jane Hayward but runs into issues with his sister Madison McCarthy, and Roderick Meeks helps Spencer Porter to begin a new relationship.

== Plot ==
Sue Sylvester (Jane Lynch) runs a physical education class which includes Spencer Porter (Marshall Williams) and Roderick Meeks (Noah Guthrie) where she challenges Roderick to perform a vertical rope climb, which he fails. Roderick asks Spencer for help with his physical fitness which Spencer originally declines, but Spencer then discovers that Roderick is friends with new student Alistair (Finneas O'Connell) on whom he has a crush, so to impress Alistair, Spencer agrees to train Roderick. Sue asks Superintendent Bob Harris (Christopher Cousins) for a letter of recommendation for a Principal of the Year Award nomination, so he asks Sue to help his nephew Myron Muskovitz (Josie Totah) prepare for his upcoming bar mitzvah party where he wants to perform. Myron shows his planned song and dance to New Directions and is shown to be very talented, but when his backup dancers are mildly criticized, he becomes very high-strung and demanding, and fires all of them on the spot. Myron tells Sue that he wants to use the auditorium for his party and have New Directions perform there, and Sue immediately agrees as she does not want to disappoint Superintendent Harris. Mason McCarthy (Billy Lewis Jr.) flirts with Jane Hayward (Samantha Marie Ware) but his advances are immediately cut off by his sister Madison McCarthy (Laura Dreyfuss). Mason confesses to Roderick and Spencer that Madison has always acted like a mother to him, and he needs Madison out of the way so he can pursue Jane. Rachel Berry (Lea Michele) and Will Schuester (Matthew Morrison) discuss song choices for the party as Will challenges Rachel to get to know her New Directions members better. Coach Sheldon Beiste (Dot-Marie Jones), Sam Evans (Chord Overstreet), Rachel, and Will meet with Sue who is having problems answering to every whim of Myron, as Sue tells them that they are being forced to be the new backup dancers for Myron, while Kitty Wilde (Becca Tobin) is not happy having to perform for this spoiled child. Spencer attempts to train Roderick but his methods are very aggressive and Roderick leaves. Mason convinces Jane to sing with him at the party, but when he tells Madison, she overreacts and embarrasses him. Later, Roderick and Spencer have an argument in the glee club room.

At the party, Mason sings a song which makes Madison realize that he is more mature than she realized, and she agrees to let him have the space he wants to pursue Jane. Myron gets trapped inside of a pod that has been lifted off the stage, and Spencer uses positive encouragement to Roderick to get him to successfully climb a rope and release the pod. As Will trains Rachel, Sheldon, and Sue for their song, Sue loses her temper with Will and they engage in a brief physical fight. Alistair meets Spencer and apologizes for ignoring Spencer at first, but when Alistair states that Roderick has brought them together, it leads to them kissing, as Spencer asks Alistair to join New Directions. After a successful bar mitzvah party is over, Sue tells Will and Rachel that Myron has been advanced into high school thanks to Superintendent Harris, and Myron is now joining New Directions as he quickly becomes friends with Kitty by bribing her. Sue swears to herself to do whatever it takes to destroy Will, Rachel and the rest of New Directions.

== Production ==
Two new recurring characters are introduced for the final five episodes of the series: Josie Totah as Myron Muskovitz, a spoiled but very talented tween who is advanced into high school to join New Directions, and Finneas O'Connell as Alistair, a new student at McKinley High who becomes the love interest of Spencer and also joins New Directions. Returning recurring characters that appear in the episode include Becca Tobin as Kitty Wilde, Christopher Cousins as Superintendent Bob Harris, Noah Guthrie as Roderick, Samantha Marie Ware as Jane Hayward, Marshall Williams as Spencer Porter, Billy Lewis Jr. as Mason McCarthy, and Laura Dreyfuss as Madison McCarthy.

The episode features six musical cover versions. "Lose My Breath" by Destiny's Child is sung by Totah. "Friday I'm in Love" by the Cure is sung by Williams. "I Want to Break Free" by Queen is sung by Lewis Jr. "Uptown Funk" by Mark Ronson featuring Bruno Mars is sung by Guthrie, Ware, and Williams. "Break Free" by Ariana Grande featuring Zedd is sung by Jones, Lynch, Michele, Morrison, Overstreet, Totah, and backup singers. "Cool Kids" by Echosmith is sung by Dreyfuss, Guthrie, Lewis Jr., O'Connell, Tobin, Totah, Ware, and Williams. Accompanying the music from this episode, the extended play Glee: The Music, Child Star was released on February 27, 2015.

== Reception ==
=== Ratings ===
The episode was watched by 1.69 million viewers and received a 0.6 rating/2 share in the adult 18-49 demographic.

=== Critical response ===
The episode received generally mixed to positive response from critics. Lauren Hoffman from Vulture stated in her review that she "DID like a lot of the things about the episode. That's due in part to how much more compelling this group of newbies is than the crop of newbies we met in season four." Emily Longeretta from Hollywood Life described the performance of "Break Free" as "a super hot performance by Rachel, Sam, and yes even Coach Beiste!" The A.V. Club's Brandon Nowalk panned the episode and stated that "the addition of the two new Directions isn't going to stick. Next week we're all going to be surprised to see eight students in the choir room, and then after a moment we'll remember." Miranda Wicker from TV Fanatic was confused by the episode, and stated "it's unclear what, exactly, we should be expecting from this weekly song and dance, but some sort of closure comes to mind. This was not it."
