= We Built This Glee Club =

- Glee episode
- Episode no.: Season 6 Episode 11
- Directed by: Joaquin Sedillo
- Written by: Aristotle Kousakis
- Production code: 6ARC12
- Original air date: March 13, 2015

Guest appearances
- Jonathan Groff as Jesse St. James; Max George as Clint; Becca Tobin as Kitty Wilde; Bill A. Jones as Rod Remington; Fortune Feimster as Butch Melman; Marshall Williams as Spencer Porter; Patricia Forte as Donna Landries; Billy Lewis Jr. as Mason McCarthy; Laura Dreyfuss as Madison McCarthy; Samantha Marie Ware as Jane Hayward; Noah Guthrie as Roderick Meeks; Josie Totah (Note: Credited as J.J. Totah.) as Myron Muskovitz; Finneas O'Connell as Alistair

Episode chronology
← Previous "The Rise and Fall of Sue Sylvester"	Next → "2009"
- Glee season 6

"We Built This Glee Club" is the eleventh episode of the sixth season of the American musical television series Glee, and the 119th overall. The episode was written by Aristotle Kousakis, directed by Joaquin Sedillo, and first aired on March 13, 2015, on Fox in the United States.

The episode features the Show Choir Sectionals competition, with New Directions desperate to win and save their club. Rachel Berry must decide whether to accept a role in a new Broadway show or return to school at NYADA. Sue Sylvester, who is the new coach of Vocal Adrenaline, is apparently going all out in her perennial efforts to defeat New Directions, though she later claims to have had other plans. The episode features the return of special guest star Jonathan Groff as Jesse St. James.

== Plot ==
While New Directions practice a dance routine for the imminent Sectionals competition, their new members from the Warblers complain that Roderick Meeks (Noah Guthrie) and Spencer Porter (Marshall Williams) are poor dancers, and will ruin the number. Kitty Wilde (Becca Tobin) suggests that they stay in the back for the good of the team, and they later go to her for help with their dancing. While they practice, Spencer injures his ankle. Football coach Sheldon Beiste diagnoses a very severe sprain, and recommends that he not compete, but Spencer insists that he be given a cortisone shot on the day of Sectionals despite the risk of permanent damage to his ankle.

Sam Evans (Chord Overstreet) continues to urge Rachel Berry (Lea Michele) to return to school at NYADA, while she seems more intent on accepting the role she has been offered on Broadway. Alone, she begins to sing and is joined by former boyfriend and rival Jesse St. James (Jonathan Groff), who tells her that he is the male lead in that Broadway musical and urges her to take the part. Later, Kurt Hummel (Chris Colfer) and Rachel talk, and he tells her that she has the rare chance to revisit her decision of a year ago and take a different path, though he will support her whatever she decides.

Boxes placed in the choir room turn out to be glitter bombs, which inundate the room and destroy the piano. People throughout the school are vomiting, and Will Schuester (Matthew Morrison) discovers that Sue Sylvester (Jane Lynch) tainted the water supply and sent the bombs. She also firebombs his car. Will gets his revenge by masquerading as Sue's hairdresser and forcibly shaving her head bald.

At Sectionals, the Falconers go first, performing with live falcons. Vocal Adrenaline, coached by Sue who is wearing a wig resembling her normal hair, does an elaborate performance with set pieces, ending their final song with a pair of human cannonballs. Rachel leads New Directions in a show circle pep talk before their set. Spencer is about to get his cortisone shot, but Roderick stops him, and offers another plan: Spencer appears in "Chandelier" by swinging in on one of the stage's chandeliers, and sings and dances in the final number while on crutches. After the judges deliberate, New Directions wins Sectionals, with an angry Vocal Adrenaline in second place.

Afterward, Sue meets Will and claims that because Will was one of the few people to stand up for her during the recent television exposé of her by Geraldo Rivera, she planned her pranks to help New Directions perform better, and deliberately sabotaged Vocal Adrenaline by devising a performance that would alienate the judges. Rachel finds Jesse in the auditorium, and tells him that she has decided to return to NYADA, and has turned down the Broadway role. Jesse is disappointed but understanding, and they kiss. New Directions says goodbye to Rachel as they place the Sectionals trophy in their trophy case, and decide to also bring back the trophies from past years. Sue observes this from the hallway with a small smile.

== Production ==
The episode was written by first-time Glee writer and script coordinator Aristotle Kousakis, and directed by first-time Glee director and regular director of photography Joaquin Sedillo. Special guest star Jonathan Groff returned as former Vocal Adrenaline lead singer and coach Jesse St. James.

Recurring characters included New Directions members Kitty Wilde (Tobin), Spencer Porter (Williams), Mason McCarthy (Billy Lewis Jr.), Madison McCarthy (Laura Dreyfuss), Jane Hayward (Samantha Marie Ware), Roderick (Guthrie), Myron Muskovitz (Josie Totah) and Alistair (Finneas O'Connell), returning Sectionals judges Rod Remington (Bill A. Jones) and Donna Landries (Patricia Forte), and Vocal Adrenaline lead singer Clint (Max George). Fortune Feimster is introduced as Butch Melman, a champion dog trainer who also judges the Sectionals competition.

The episode features seven musical cover versions. "Listen to Your Heart" by Roxette is sung by Michele and Groff. "Broken Wings" by Mr. Mister is sung by the Falconers, who are uncredited. "We Built This City" by Starship and "Mickey" by Toni Basil are sung by George with Vocal Adrenaline. "Take Me to Church" by Hozier is sung by Guthrie, Tobin, Ware, and New Directions. "Chandelier" by Sia is sung by Dreyfuss, Tobin, Ware, and New Directions. "Come Sail Away" by Styx is sung by Lewis Jr., Dreyfuss, Williams, Tobin, and New Directions. Six of the seven songs, excluding "Broken Wings", were released on the extended play Glee: The Music, We Built This Glee Club on March 17, 2015.

== Reception ==
=== Ratings ===
The episode was watched by 2.02 million viewers and received a 0.7 rating/2 share in the adult 18-49 demographic.

=== Critical response ===
The episode received a positive response from critics. Lauren Hoffman from Vulture gave the episode four out of five stars, and commented the episode was "a welcome return to form, like slipping under a warm, comfortable blanket." Christopher Rogers from Hollywood Life wrote that "If Glee's trying to go out with a bang, they're certainly accomplishing that—at least in the literal sense." The A.V. Club's Brandon Nowalk rated the episode a "C−" and stated that "a farewell tour without one last Sylvester scheme would be missing some ineffable quality vital to the genetic makeup of Glee." Miranda Wicker from TV Fanatic gave the episode four out of five stars, and reminisced that "knowing that this was the last time we'll see the New Directions in competition just has me feeling a little weepy."
