= The Rise and Fall of Sue Sylvester =

- Glee episode
- Episode no.: Season 6 Episode 10
- Directed by: Anthony Hemingway
- Written by: Jessica Meyer
- Production code: 6ARC11
- Original air date: March 6, 2015

Guest appearances
- Carol Burnett as Doris Sylvester; Geraldo Rivera as himself; Michael Bolton as himself; Carnie Wilson as herself; Christopher Cousins as Superintendent Bob Harris; Max George as Clint; Becca Tobin as Kitty Wilde; Bill A. Jones as Rod Remington; Earlene Davis as Andrea Carmichael; Lauren Potter as Becky Jackson; Samuel Larsen as Joe Hart; Marshall Williams as Spencer Porter; Noah Guthrie as Roderick Meeks; Billy Lewis Jr. as Mason McCarthy; Laura Dreyfuss as Madison McCarthy; Samantha Marie Ware as Jane Hayward; Justin Prentice as Darrell; Josie Totah (Note: Credited as J.J. Totah.) as Myron Muskovitz; Finneas O'Connell as Alistair

Episode chronology
← Previous "Child Star"	Next → "We Built This Glee Club"
- Glee season 6

"The Rise and Fall of Sue Sylvester" is the tenth episode of the sixth season of the American musical television series Glee, and the 118th overall. The episode was written by Jessica Meyer, directed by Anthony Hemingway, and first aired on March 6, 2015 on Fox in the United States.

The episode takes place as a tragedy to Dalton Academy causes rival groups New Directions and the Warblers to unite, and the lies surrounding Sue Sylvester come to a climactic head that results in her being fired and exposed on television, and yet she somehow recovers. The episode featured special guest star Carol Burnett as Doris Sylvester, and special appearances by Geraldo Rivera as himself, Michael Bolton as himself, and Carnie Wilson as herself.

== Plot ==
New Directions members Alistair (Finneas O'Connell), Jane Hayward (Samantha Marie Ware), Mason McCarthy (Billy Lewis Jr.), Madison McCarthy (Laura Dreyfuss), Myron Muskovitz (Josie Totah), Spencer Porter (Marshall Williams), Roderick Meeks (Noah Guthrie), and Kitty Wilde (Becca Tobin) practice a song for Will Schuester (Matthew Morrison) when Blaine Anderson (Darren Criss) and Kurt Hummel (Chris Colfer) arrive. In shock, Blaine announces that his school, Dalton Academy, has burned to the ground. Will decides to allow the Warblers from Dalton Academy to transfer to McKinley High and all join New Directions to which Sue Sylvester (Jane Lynch) objects, but Will has already cleared the transfer with Superintendent Bob Harris (Christopher Cousins). Becky Jackson (Lauren Potter), along with her boyfriend Darrell (Justin Prentice), is outraged with Sue for her refusal to accept the Warblers and she storms out of Sue's office vowing to take action against Sue. Meanwhile, Rachel Berry (Lea Michele) has returned to NYADA to beg for readmission. Sue is called in to Superintendent Harris' office with Will present as Harris reveals that Becky has given him the location of Sue's hurt locker (as first seen in "The Hurt Locker, Part One"), and that he discovered there Sue's elaborate revenge schemes including a voodoo doll of his nephew Myron and a copy of Penthouse magazine in which Sue engaged in a pornographic photo spread. Harris announces he has no choice but to fire Sue immediately.

Sue accepts an interview with Geraldo Rivera on Fox News to attempt to clear her name, but instead, Geraldo turns it into an exposé on Sue which reveals that she is a compulsive liar. Included among the various lies Geraldo discredited were: she did not play tambourine for Wilson Phillips (countered by Carnie Wilson), that Michael Bolton is not the father of her child (countered by Bolton himself), that her care for the students of McKinley High has been nothing but torture to most of them, and that her parents were not Nazi hunters (countered by Sue's mother, Doris Sylvester (Carol Burnett), who even states that she could not truly love Sue). It is also revealed that Becky was the one who exposed all of Sue's secrets. The only people who stand up for Sue in the end are Coach Sheldon Beiste (Dot-Marie Jones) and Will. Doris visits Sue and they apologize to each other and reconcile with a song.

Rachel tells Blaine, Sam Evans (Chord Overstreet), and Mercedes Jones (Amber Riley) that she is hopeful to be reinstated at NYADA, and at that moment, Rachel receives a phone call telling her that she has been accepted in a part for the musical she auditioned for back in the episode "What the World Needs Now". She is immediately convinced this is the better choice for her while Sam hesitates, believing that returning to school would be a better choice. The combined members of New Directions and the Warblers attempt to rehearse together, but there is still tension between the two groups, partially due to the Warblers refusal to give up wearing their traditional blue Warblers blazers which is causing separation between the two groups. However, the Warblers believe that the blazers are their one last tribute to Dalton. Coach Beiste suddenly announces that Sue has been accepted as the new coach of Vocal Adrenaline, as she has convinced Clint (Max George) and the rest of the group that her leadership and hatred for New Directions will lead them to victory. Sam tells Rachel his feelings about her refusal to continue to pursue NYADA, and at that moment, Rachel receives a call from NYADA telling her that she has been reinstated if she desires, but Rachel is convinced that Broadway is her path while Sam continues his objection. Sue returns to tell Will her intentions to destroy New Directions and they have a song battle where their imaginations run wild, but the real performance is watched with stunned amazement by Kurt, Rachel, and the rest of New Directions. Myron tells Rachel that Superintendent Harris has declared that if New Directions does not win their regionals, then New Directions and all other fine arts programs will be eliminated at McKinley High, but together, Rachel, Kurt, Blaine, and Will agree to fight harder than before. They then bring all members of New Directions and Warblers together in a song as they unveil a compromise uniform featuring a red blazer to combine the blazer of Dalton Academy with the traditional red color of McKinley High.

== Production ==
Carol Burnett makes a special guest star appearance as Doris Sylvester, the mother of Sue Sylvester. Additional special appearances are made by Geraldo Rivera, Michael Bolton, and Carnie Wilson all as themselves. Regular recurring guest actors were (in order of crediting): Christopher Cousins as Superintendent Bob Harris, Max George as Clint, Becca Tobin as Kitty Wilde, Bill A. Jones as Rod Remington, Earlene Davis as Andrea Carmichael, Lauren Potter as Becky Jackson, Samuel Larsen as Joe Hart, Marshall Williams as Spencer Porter, Noah Guthrie as Roderick, Billy Lewis Jr. as Mason McCarthy, Laura Dreyfuss as Madison McCarthy, Samantha Marie Ware as Jane Hayward, Justin Prentice as Darrell, Josie Totah as Myron Muskovitz, and Finneas O'Connell as Alistair.

The episode features four musical cover versions and one original song. "Rather Be" by Clean Bandit featuring Jess Glynne is sung by Dreyfuss, Guthrie, Lewis Jr., O'Connell, Tobin, Totah, Ware, and Williams. "The Trolley Song" by Judy Garland as featured in the film Meet Me in St. Louis is sung by Burnett and Lynch. "Far from Over" by Frank Stallone is sung by George and the members of Vocal Adrenaline. "The Final Countdown" by Europe is sung by Lynch and Morrison. The song "Rise" is an original song composed by Criss that is sung by Dreyfuss, Guthrie, Lewis Jr., O'Connell, Tobin, Totah, Ware, and Williams, along with the Warblers. Accompanying the music from this episode, the extended play Glee: The Music, The Rise and Fall of Sue Sylvester was released on March 6, 2015.

== Reception ==
=== Ratings ===
The episode was watched by 1.81 million viewers and received a 0.6 rating/2 share in the adult 18-49 demographic.

=== Critical response ===
The episode received mixed reviews from critics. Lauren Hoffman from Vulture was so confused by the episode that she summarized in her review "Seriously, what the hell was that episode?" Christopher Rogers from Hollywood Life was shocked to see that "After everything Sue Sylvester (Jane Lynch) has ever done to the students at McKinley High, we never thought Becky Jackson (Lauren Potter) would be the one to defeat her." The A.V. Club's Brandon Nowalk rated the episode a B− and stated that "it's a pleasant surprise that it flies by with a go-for-broke late-season sense of adventure." Miranda Wicker from TV Fanatic loved how the episode was "about underdogs who became champions, and even when they don't stay on top forever, they keep moving forward. Some diabolically and some, well, less so."
