= A Wedding (Glee) =

- Glee episode
- Episode no.: Season 6 Episode 8
- Directed by: Bradley Buecker
- Written by: Ross Maxwell
- Production code: 6ARC08
- Original air date: February 20, 2015

Guest appearances
- Gloria Estefan as Maribel Lopez; Ken Jeong as Pierce Pierce; Jennifer Coolidge as Whitney Pierce; Gina Gershon as Pam Anderson; Heather Morris as Brittany Pierce; Naya Rivera as Santana Lopez; Mark Salling as Noah "Puck" Puckerman; Harry Shum, Jr. as Mike Chang; Becca Tobin as Kitty Wilde; Jenna Ushkowitz as Tina Cohen-Chang; Mike O'Malley as Burt Hummel; Romy Rosemont as Carole Hudson-Hummel; Harry Hamlin as Walter; Vanessa Lengies as Sugar Motta; Ivonne Coll as Alma Lopez; Samantha Marie Ware as Jane Hayward; Noah Guthrie as Roderick Meeks; Marshall Williams as Spencer Porter; Billy Lewis Jr. as Mason McCarthy; Laura Dreyfuss as Madison McCarthy

Episode chronology
← Previous "Transitioning"	Next → "Child Star"
- Glee season 6

"A Wedding" is the eighth episode of the sixth season of the American musical television series Glee, and the 116th overall. The episode was written by Ross Maxwell, directed by executive producer Bradley Buecker, and first aired on February 20, 2015 on Fox in the United States.

The episode features the planning for and wedding day of Brittany Pierce and Santana Lopez, which unexpectedly turns into a double wedding, with Blaine Anderson and Kurt Hummel also marrying each other in a joint ceremony with Brittany and Santana. The episode features special guest stars Gloria Estefan as Santana's mother Maribel Lopez, Ken Jeong and Jennifer Coolidge as Brittany's parents Pierce and Whitney Pierce, and Gina Gershon as Blaine's mother Pam Anderson.

== Plot ==
Whitney Pierce (Jennifer Coolidge) brings Artie Abrams (Kevin McHale), Brittany Pierce (Heather Morris), Santana Lopez (Naya Rivera), and Santana's mother Maribel Lopez (Gloria Estefan) to a barn in Indiana where she wants Brittany and Santana to be married in, as it was the birthplace of Brittany and because gay marriage is legal in Indiana but not in Ohio. Decorations begin with the help of Kurt Hummel (Chris Colfer) and Tina Cohen-Chang (Jenna Ushkowitz) but Brittany has wedding jitters as their officiant has cancelled, so Kurt realizes that his father, Burt Hummel (Mike O'Malley) can officiate. Santana asks Rachel Berry (Lea Michele), Mercedes Jones (Amber Riley), and Tina to help pick dresses for herself and Brittany, but Santana breaks tradition by seeing Brittany in her wedding dress which sends Brittany into a superstitious frenzy. While planning a seating chart, Rachel is hesitant about being with Sam Evans (Chord Overstreet) as she is unsure if Burt and his wife Carole Hudson (Romy Rosemont) will object, but Mercedes assures her that it will be accepted. Santana flatly refuses to allow Sue Sylvester (Jane Lynch) to be at the wedding. Kurt tells his friend Walter (Harry Hamlin) that he is going to the wedding with Blaine Anderson (Darren Criss), and Walter gently breaks off their relationship while encouraging Kurt to pursue his true love. Kurt runs to Blaine's home where they confess their mutual love for one another and kiss. Tina tells Artie, Blaine, and Noah "Puck" Puckerman (Mark Salling) her intentions to propose to Mike Chang (Harry Shum, Jr.) even though they have just reunited as friends and are mostly communicating via text messages. She asks for their blessing, which they do, though Artie initially hesitates. Sue tells Santana that she really wants to attend her wedding but Santana again curtly rejects her.

At the wedding venue, Burt tells Kurt and Blaine that he had no regrets about going into a second marriage with Carole, and she tells them to seize every moment. Brittany is still in a superstitious frenzy which is only increased when Santana comes in with Brittany in her wedding dress, but Santana calms her down. Sue arrives, having brought Santana's grandmother, Alma Lopez (Ivonne Coll), who she has helped to realize that although Alma may not believe females should marry each other, family is the most important thing, and she asks to attend the wedding. Santana then forgives Sue and allows her to stay. Sue then pulls Blaine and Kurt to a room where there are two wedding tuxedos waiting for them. Brittany explains that Blaine and Kurt's relationship inspired her, and that she would like for them to be married alongside her and Santana, who also supports the idea. After some debate and hesitation, Blaine and Kurt agree to get married in a joint ceremony. Brittany, Santana, Kurt and Blaine have a shared exchange of vows, and both couples are married. After some dancing, Tina privately asks Mike to marry her, but Mike gently turns her down, as he does love her but not in that way. Back at McKinley High, Tina and Artie have lunch together and agree to marry each other if neither one is married by age 30. Sue gives a honeymoon vacation to each of the newlywed couples.

== Production ==
Returning recurring characters that appear in the episode include Heather Morris as Brittany Pierce, Naya Rivera as Santana Lopez, Mark Salling as Noah "Puck" Puckerman, Harry Shum, Jr. as Mike Chang, Becca Tobin as Kitty Wilde, Jenna Ushkowitz as Tina Cohen-Chang, Mike O'Malley as Burt Hummel, Romy Rosemont as Carole Hudson, Vanessa Lengies as Sugar Motta, Samantha Marie Ware as Jane Hayward, Noah Guthrie as Roderick Meeks, Marshall Williams as Spencer Porter, Billy Lewis Jr. as Mason McCarthy, and Laura Dreyfuss as Madison McCarthy. Guest appearances are made by Gloria Estefan as Maribel Lopez, Ken Jeong as Pierce Pierce, Jennifer Coolidge as Whitney Pierce, Gina Gershon as Pam Anderson (Blaine's mother), and Harry Hamlin as Walter.

The episode features four musical cover versions and one featured song. "It's Beautiful" by SOFIA was featured as background music during a scene where Brittany and Santana try on wedding dresses. "At Last" by Etta James was sung by Riley and McHale. "Hey Ya!" by Outkast is sung by McHale with Ware, Dreyfuss, and multiple wedding guests. "I'm So Excited" by the Pointer Sisters is sung by Estefan, Coolidge, Rosemont, and Gershon with Lengies, Riley, Rivera, and Morris. "Our Day Will Come" by Ruby & the Romantics is sung by Rivera, Morris, Criss, and Colfer. Accompanying the music from this episode, the extended play Glee: The Music, A Wedding was released on February 20, 2015.

== Reception ==
=== Ratings ===
The episode was watched by 1.86 million viewers and received a 0.6 rating/2 share in the adult 18-49 demographic.

=== Critical response ===
The episode received mixed reviews from critics. Lauren Hoffman from Vulture thought the episode was "overly sentimental, unrealistic, and a tiny bit too preoccupied with fan service. It was also really, really lovely." Christopher Rogers from Hollywood Life loved that the episode "was more like a series reunion, as familiar faces returned for what turned out to be a surprise double wedding!" The A.V. Club's Brandon Nowalk stated the plot "is a bunch of inevitabilities; play along with your checklist until we get to something new. The script is a bunch of very bad attempts at breeze." Miranda Wicker from TV Fanatic stated in her review that the episode would be known as "the best episode of the series' final season."
