= Transitioning (Glee) =

- Glee episode
- Episode no.: Season 6 Episode 7
- Directed by: Dante Di Loreto
- Written by: Matthew Hodgson
- Production code: 6ARC07
- Original air date: February 13, 2015

Guest appearances
- Jayma Mays as Emma Pillsbury; Alex Newell as Wade "Unique" Adams; Max Adler as Dave Karofsky; Max George as Clint; Harry Hamlin as Walter; Gary Grubbs as Jimbo Wilson; Marshall Williams as Spencer Porter; Samantha Marie Ware as Jane Hayward; Noah Guthrie as Roderick Meeks; Billy Lewis Jr. as Mason McCarthy; Laura Dreyfuss as Madison McCarthy; Becca Tobin as Kitty Wilde (uncredited)

Episode chronology
← Previous "What the World Needs Now"	Next → "A Wedding"
- Glee season 6

"Transitioning" is the seventh episode of the sixth season of the American musical television series Glee, and the 115th overall. The episode was written by Matthew Hodgson, directed by Dante Di Loreto, and first aired on February 13, 2015 on Fox in the United States.

The episode takes place as Will Schuester has problems with the methods of Vocal Adrenaline, and he attempts to teach them some respect. Rachel Berry must deal with her childhood home being sold, and Coach Beiste makes a difficult return to McKinley High to begin life as a man.

== Plot ==
Will Schuester (Matthew Morrison) and his wife Emma (Jayma Mays) discover that Vocal Adrenaline, led by Clint (Max George), have thrown eggs at Rachel Berry (Lea Michele) and Blaine Anderson (Darren Criss), so he makes a lesson about tolerance and brings in Wade "Unique" Adams (Alex Newell) to help, but Clint and the other members don't care. Coach Beiste (Dot-Marie Jones) returns from sex reassignment surgery and is now named Sheldon Beiste. Principal Sue Sylvester (Jane Lynch) and Sam Evans (Chord Overstreet) welcome him back, as Sue promises there will be no issues at the school with Beiste's new appearance including standing up against any bullying. Rachel Berry (Lea Michele) tells Sam that her childhood home has been sold by her fathers, and she is distressed over this, so Sam asks Kurt Hummel (Chris Colfer), Mercedes Jones (Amber Riley), Artie Abrams (Kevin McHale), Kitty Wilde (Becca Tobin), and Blaine to help. Beiste's car is vandalized by Vocal Adrenaline, and Will is furious. Rachel and Kurt announce the lesson for New Directions is "transitioning", as members Spencer Porter (Marshall Williams), Jane Hayward (Samantha Marie Ware), Mason McCarthy (Billy Lewis Jr) and Madison McCarthy (Laura Dreyfuss) are all invited to a party to bid farewell to Rachel's home, and there they must sing duets. Mercedes is paired with Roderick Meeks (Noah Guthrie) and Kurt cheats his way into a duet with Blaine. Sam and Spencer want to take physical action against Vocal Adrenaline but Beiste stops them. Will calls out Vocal Adrenaline for their actions, but Clint's winner-take-all attitude causes Will to drop him from the team. Will and Emma discuss Will's problems with coaching Vocal Adrenaline.

At the party, Rachel and Sam sneak upstairs to her old bedroom to say goodbye, and there they kiss and make out. Kurt and Blaine sing their duet which leads to them kissing outside. Beiste meets up with Unique and they discuss their mutual problems as Unique assures Beiste that he is not alone. Clint returns to Vocal Adrenaline, having been reinstated by the principal, but Will accepts the change and volunteers to take Vocal Adrenaline to McKinley High to pull another prank. Blaine tells his boyfriend Dave Karofsky (Max Adler) about the kiss and they break up on good terms, as Dave realizes that Kurt and Blaine are still in love with each other. Blaine runs to tell Kurt but sees him with Kurt's new friend Walter (Harry Hamlin) so he does not tell Kurt anything. Will and Vocal Adrenaline sneak into McKinley High's auditorium for their prank, but it is revealed to be an intervention of Unique and a choir of transgender individuals, as Beiste is welcomed into the choir where he finds acceptance. Will quits Vocal Adrenaline and accepts a volunteer position to help with New Directions.

== Production ==
Returning recurring characters that appear in the episode include Jayma Mays as Emma Pillsbury, Becca Tobin as Kitty Wilde, Alex Newell as Wade "Unique" Adams, Max Adler as Dave Karofsky, Max George as Clint, Harry Hamlin as Walter, Marshall Williams as Spencer Porter, Samantha Marie Ware as Jane Hayward, Noah Guthrie as Roderick, Billy Lewis Jr. as Mason McCarthy, and Laura Dreyfuss as Madison McCarthy. Gary Grubbs guest stars as Jimbo Wilson, an exuberant booster of Vocal Adrenaline.

The episode features six musical cover versions. "You Give Love a Bad Name" by Bon Jovi is sung by George and Vocal Adrenaline. "Same Love" by Macklemore & Ryan Lewis featuring Mary Lambert is sung by Morrison and Newell. "All About That Bass" by Meghan Trainor is sung by Riley and Guthrie. "Somebody Loves You" by Betty Who is sung by Colfer and Criss. "Time After Time" by Cyndi Lauper is sung by Michele and Overstreet. "I Know Where I've Been" from the musical Hairspray is sung by Newell with Jones and a transgender choir.

Accompanying the music from this episode, the EP Glee: The Music, Transitioning was released on February 13, 2015.

== Reception ==
=== Ratings ===
The episode was watched by 1.81 million viewers and received a 0.6 rating/2 share in the adult 18-49 demographic.

=== Critical response ===
Lauren Hoffman from Vulture thought the episode "succeeds because it's simple and small." Christopher Rogers from Hollywood Life believed "The theme of this week’s episode was pretty spot-on with its title." The A.V. Club's Brandon Nowalk stated the episode "isn't anywhere near as insulting as I expected, which is almost the same thing as being good." Miranda Wicker from TV Fanatic stated in her review that the episode "focused on something which has always been at the heart and soul of this show: Accepting people. No matter what. Glee has been about people finding their tribe."
