= What the World Needs Now (Glee) =

- Glee episode
- Episode no.: Season 6 Episode 6
- Directed by: Barbara Brown
- Written by: Michael Hitchcock
- Production code: 6ARC06
- Original air date: February 6, 2015

Guest appearances
- Ken Jeong as Pierce Pierce; Jennifer Coolidge as Whitney Pierce; Heather Morris as Brittany Pierce; Naya Rivera as Santana Lopez; Becca Tobin as Kitty Wilde; Ivonne Coll as Alma Lopez; Samantha Marie Ware as Jane Hayward; Noah Guthrie as Roderick; Marshall Williams as Spencer Porter; Billy Lewis Jr. as Mason McCarthy; Laura Dreyfuss as Madison McCarthy

Episode chronology
← Previous "The Hurt Locker, Part Two"	Next → "Transitioning"
- Glee season 6

"What the World Needs Now" is the sixth episode of the sixth season of the American musical television series Glee, and the 114th overall. The episode was written by Michael Hitchcock, directed by Barbara Brown, and first aired on February 6, 2015 on Fox in the United States.

The episode takes place as Mercedes Jones returns to McKinley High to help Rachel Berry with New Directions, and at the same time convince her to attempt to return to New York to be on Broadway. Meanwhile, Santana Lopez and Brittany Pierce prepare for their wedding as Brittany tries to repair the torn relationship between Santana and her grandmother. Special guest appearances were made by Ken Jeong and Jennifer Coolidge as Brittany's parents, Pierce Pierce and Whitney Pierce, and Ivonne Coll who reprised her role as Alma Lopez, the grandmother ("abuela") of Santana Lopez, for the first time since her only appearance on the season three episode "I Kissed a Girl".

The episode received mixed to positive reviews from critics and in the U.S., the episode was watched by 1.58 million viewers, making this episode the least watched episode of Glee during its entire series run.

== Plot ==
Sam Evans (Chord Overstreet) and Rachel Berry (Lea Michele) have awkward meetings as they realize that they are starting to feel romantic emotions for each other based on their previous encounters, but Sam also still has feelings for his former girlfriend Mercedes Jones (Amber Riley). Meanwhile, Brittany Pierce (Heather Morris) discusses her wedding plans to Santana Lopez (Naya Rivera) with her parents Pierce (Ken Jeong) and Whitney (Jennifer Coolidge). They reveal to her that Brittany's real father is Stephen Hawking, which explains her extreme intelligence. Rachel and Kurt Hummel (Chris Colfer) give New Directions members Kitty Wilde (Becca Tobin), Spencer Porter (Marshall Williams), Jane Hayward (Samantha Marie Ware), Roderick (Noah Guthrie), Mason McCarthy (Billy Lewis Jr.) and Madison McCarthy (Laura Dreyfuss) (joined by New Directions alumni Artie Abrams (Kevin McHale), Brittany, and Santana) their assignment to sing songs composed by Burt Bacharach, and they have brought in Mercedes to assist. Mercedes also tries to convince Rachel to pursue her relationship with Sam, while also informing her of an audition for a new show in New York that Rachel has been accepted to. However, Rachel is still scared from her previous failures and is not sure she wants to audition. Mercedes asks the male members of New Directions along with Blaine Anderson (Darren Criss) to help her convince Rachel.

Brittany asks Artie to be her wedding planner and he accepts, as they agree on a theme of "heaven". As Brittany and Santana go through a wedding invitation list, Santana is hesitant about inviting her grandmother, Alma (Ivonne Coll), because Alma has disavowed Santana ever since she came out to her as lesbian (as seen in the episode "I Kissed a Girl"). Unknown to Santana, Brittany poses as a nurse for Alma and begins to make a friendship with her, telling her that she is engaged but not who her fiancée is. Brittany gets Alma to appear on her webcast show and state how important it is to have family be at a wedding. Sam tells Mercedes that he still has feelings for her, but Mercedes tells him that they will only be friends, and that he should go ahead and pursue Rachel. Rachel finally decides to go to New York and audition for the show. Brittany invites Alma to attend a performance where she reveals that Santana is her fiancée, but Alma's prejudice is too strong and she rejects their engagement, and Brittany tells her off for doing so. New Directions members, both alumni and new, along with Will Schuester (Matthew Morrison), celebrate Brittany's and Santana's love.

== Production ==
Ken Jeong and Jennifer Coolidge made guest appearances as Brittany's parents, Pierce Pierce and Whitney Pierce, and Ivonne Coll reprised her role as Alma Lopez, the grandmother of Santana Lopez. Returning recurring characters that appear in the episode include Heather Morris as Brittany Pierce, Naya Rivera as Santana Lopez, Becca Tobin as Kitty Wilde, Samantha Marie Ware as Jane Hayward, Noah Guthrie as Roderick, Marshall Williams as Spencer Porter, Billy Lewis Jr. as Mason McCarthy and Laura Dreyfuss as Madison McCarthy.

The episode features eight musical cover versions. All featured music from this episode was written and/or composed by Burt Bacharach. "I'll Never Fall in Love Again" by Dionne Warwick was sung by Michele and Overstreet. "Baby It's You" by The Shirelles was sung by Riley with Michele, Morris, and Rivera. "Wishin' and Hopin'" by Dionne Warwick was sung by Morris, McHale, Criss, and Overstreet. "Arthur's Theme (Best That You Can Do)" by Christopher Cross was sung by Criss, McHale, Williams, Guthrie, Lewis Jr., Overstreet, and Colfer. "(They Long to Be) Close to You" by The Carpenters was sung by Overstreet. "Promises, Promises" from the musical Promises, Promises was sung by Michele. "Alfie" by Cilla Black was sung by Rivera. "What the World Needs Now Is Love" by Jackie DeShannon was sung by all the aforementioned performers and Morrison except Morris and Rivera.

Accompanying the music from this episode, the EP Glee: The Music, What the World Needs Now was released on February 6, 2015.

== Reception ==
=== Ratings ===
The episode was watched by 1.58 million viewers and received a 0.5 rating/2 share in the adult 18-49 demographic, marking this episode the least watched and lowest rated episode of the entire series run.

=== Critical response ===
Lauren Hoffman from Vulture thought "the performances themselves are pretty flat", but later commented "it feels like a few short weeks from now, even after we've said good-bye to these characters, they'll still exist on each other's couches, laughing and singing in a happy heap." Christopher Rogers from Hollywood Life believed that "Rachel found the mojo she was missing and used it to take charge of her life." The A.V. Club's Brandon Nowalk stated in his review "The episode sneaks up on you, until finally you realize this is the most energized anyone in the cast has been in years." Miranda Wicker from TV Fanatic believed that "Mercedes gave the final season the best subtitle it could possibly have when she noted that this, rehabilitating a defunct glee club, was a step on The Rachel Berry Rebuilding Project. That's really what this season has become, and hey, I don't mind."
