= Dreams Come True (Glee) =

- Glee episode
- Episode no.: Season 6 Episode 13
- Directed by: Bradley Buecker
- Written by: Ryan Murphy; Brad Falchuk; Ian Brennan
- Production code: 6ARC13
- Original air date: March 20, 2015

Guest appearances
- Jonathan Groff as Jesse St. James; Geraldo Rivera as himself; Andrew Rannells as himself; Dianna Agron as Quinn Fabray; Jacob Artist as Jake Puckerman; Jessalyn Gilsig as Terri Schuester; Blake Jenner as Ryder Lynn; Jayma Mays as Emma Pillsbury; Heather Morris as Brittany Pierce; Alex Newell as Wade "Unique" Adams; Mike O'Malley as Burt Hummel; Naya Rivera as Santana Lopez; Mark Salling as Noah "Puck" Puckerman; Harry Shum Jr. as Mike Chang; Becca Tobin as Kitty Wilde; Jenna Ushkowitz as Tina Cohen-Chang; Max Adler as Dave Karofsky; Christopher Cousins as Superintendent Bob Harris; Tim Bagley as Harvey Milk Elementary School teacher; Laura Dreyfuss as Madison McCarthy; Ashley Fink as Lauren Zizes; Noah Guthrie as Roderick Meeks; Samuel Larsen as Joe Hart; Vanessa Lengies as Sugar Motta; Billy Lewis Jr. as Mason McCarthy; Finneas O'Connell as Alistair; Lauren Potter as Becky Jackson; Romy Rosemont as Carole Hummel; Dijon Talton as Matt Rutherford; Iqbal Theba as Principal Figgins; Josie Totah (Note: Credited as J.J. Totah.) as Myron Muskovitz; Samantha Marie Ware as Jane Hayward; Marshall Williams as Spencer Porter; Jane Galloway Heitz as Lilian Adler (uncredited)

Episode chronology
← Previous "2009"	Next → —
- Glee season 6

"Dreams Come True" is the series finale of the American musical television series Glee. It is also the 13th and final episode of the show's sixth season and the 121st episode overall. Written by the show's co-creators Ryan Murphy, Brad Falchuk, and Ian Brennan and directed by Bradley Buecker, it aired on Fox in the United States on March 20, 2015, along with the previous episode, "2009", as a two-hour special.

The episode explores the aftermath of the New Directions' victory at the 2015 Nationals show choir competition, with changes in store for both the school itself as well as Will Schuester. It features a flashforward to the year 2020 that traces the fates of the characters. Jonathan Groff guest stars as Jesse St. James, with Geraldo Rivera and Andrew Rannells appearing as themselves.

== Plot ==
After pausing for a moment to think back on his own show choir past, Will Schuester (Matthew Morrison) joins his New Directions members on stage as they are now in the finals for the show choir national championship (winning Regionals off-screen). New Directions wins, and afterwards, Superintendent Bob Harris (Christopher Cousins) tells Will that McKinley High is being converted into a performing arts school, and that Will is to become its principal. Three months later, Will is nervous for his first day, but his wife Emma Pillsbury (Jayma Mays) consoles him. Will welcomes back New Directions members from both past and present who have reunited for this day and announces that New Directions will no longer be the only glee club choir at McKinley High, as he is re-creating the Troubletones and creating both a new all-boys group and a junior varsity glee club, but Will is not to be the coach of any group including New Directions. He then bids them farewell with a song.

Blaine Anderson (Darren Criss) meets with Sam Evans (Chord Overstreet) and asks Sam to move to New York, but Sam states he is happy where he is and that he has other plans for his future. Will then introduces Sam as the new coach of New Directions. Mercedes Jones (Amber Riley) invites some friends to the auditorium to announce that she has been selected as the opening act for Beyoncé so she will most likely not see any of them again for some time, and she leaves the building with a song.

Blaine and Kurt Hummel (Chris Colfer) meet Sue Sylvester (Jane Lynch) in Will's new principal's office and they thank Sue for reuniting them. Sue explains that learning about Kurt and his struggles opened up new worlds for her and thanks them in kind. Sue next meets Becky Jackson (Lauren Potter) who apologizes for exposing Sue to the national media and they reconcile. Sue finally meets Will in the auditorium and says goodbye to him with a song. In a flashforward to the year 2020, Geraldo Rivera congratulates Sue for winning reelection as Vice President of the United States under Jeb Bush as she states her intent to run for President in 2024.

In 2020, Blaine and Kurt go to Harvey Milk Elementary School to encourage kids to pursue their dreams. Meanwhile, also in 2020, Rachel Berry (Lea Michele) reunites with Mercedes, Blaine, Kurt, and Artie Abrams (Kevin McHale) and Tina Cohen-Chang (Jenna Ushkowitz), who are now a couple. Rachel is now pregnant as the surrogate mother for Blaine and Kurt's child, and is also now married to Jesse St. James (Jonathan Groff). Later that day, Rachel wins the Tony Award for Best Actress in a Musical and she thanks all of her friends but especially Will Schuester for his mentorship. In the fall of 2020, Vice President Sue Sylvester rededicates the McKinley High auditorium to be named in honor of Finn Hudson while apologizing for her previous poor perception of the glee club. McKinley High has now become a model of excellence and other schools are copying its format. New Directions members from throughout its history unite for one last group song. The last shot of the series is of three plaques: the re-dedication plaque for the auditorium and the memorial ones for former glee club director Lillian Adler and Finn Hudson.

== Production ==
As this was the series finale, multiple former actors returned to the show for one last reunion. Jonathan Groff guest starred as Jesse St. James; Geraldo Rivera and Andrew Rannells made guest appearances as themselves. Other regular character guest actors in this episode were: Dianna Agron as Quinn Fabray, Jacob Artist as Jake Puckerman, Jessalyn Gilsig as Terri Schuester, Blake Jenner as Ryder Lynn, Jayma Mays as Emma Pillsbury, Heather Morris as Brittany Pierce, Alex Newell as Wade "Unique" Adams, Mike O'Malley as Burt Hummel, Naya Rivera as Santana Lopez, Mark Salling as Noah "Puck" Puckerman, Harry Shum Jr. as Mike Chang, Becca Tobin as Kitty Wilde, Jenna Ushkowitz as Tina Cohen-Chang, Max Adler as Dave Karofsky, Christopher Cousins as Superintendent Bob Harris, Laura Dreyfuss as Madison McCarthy, Ashley Fink as Lauren Zizes, Noah Guthrie as Roderick Meeks, Samuel Larsen as Joe Hart, Vanessa Lengies as Sugar Motta, Billy Lewis Jr. as Mason McCarthy, Finneas O'Connell as Alistair, Lauren Potter as Becky Jackson, Romy Rosemont as Carole Hudson-Hummel, Dijon Talton as Matt Rutherford, Iqbal Theba as Principal Figgins, Josie Totah as Myron Muskovitz, Samantha Marie Ware as Jane Hayward, and Marshall Williams as Spencer Porter. Tim Bagley was introduced as the Harvey Milk Elementary School teacher. Both Melissa Benoist, who played Marley Rose, and Damian McGinty, who played Rory Flanagan, were invited back, but declined due to scheduling conflicts; Benoist was filming the pilot for Supergirl, while McGinty had newly returned to Irish singing group Celtic Thunder.

The episode featured five musical cover versions and one original song. "Teach Your Children" by Crosby, Stills, Nash & Young is sung by Morrison. "Someday We'll Be Together" by Diana Ross & the Supremes is sung by Riley. "The Winner Takes It All" by ABBA is sung by Lynch and Morrison. "Daydream Believer" by The Monkees is sung by Colfer and Criss. "This Time" is an original composition by Criss and is sung by Michele. "I Lived" by OneRepublic is sung by Michele, Criss, Overstreet, Morrison, Riley, McHale, Colfer and Guthrie with all cast members in the chorus, and was the last song to be sung on the series after six seasons and over 700 musical performances. Accompanying this episode, the extended play Glee: The Music, Dreams Come True was released on March 17, 2015. It debuted on the Billboard 200 at number 63 on the chart dated April 4, 2015, with 8,000 units sold, the first Glee appearance there since April 12, 2014.

Series regular Jenna Ushkowitz, writing in a column for The Hollywood Reporter, revealed that the last scene filmed was the gathering in the choir room when Will Schuester sings "Teach Your Children" to the five original New Directions members from the pilot episode.

The Hollywood Reporter also noted that after the finale wrapped filming, a number of actors took pieces of the set home as souvenirs. Michele tweeted a photo of her taking home the framed football jersey of Cory Monteith's character, Finn Hudson. Lynch took some of her signature tracksuits; Criss came away with trophies, some soundproofing from the choir room, the couch from Figgins' office, and his Warblers jacket; Riley claimed her sneakers from the pilot episode; Overstreet's souvenirs included trophies, photos and clothing; Dot-Marie Jones kept a football championship ring; and Salling took a plaque with Monteith's picture.

== Reception ==
=== Ratings ===
The series finale was watched by 2.54 million viewers, and received a 0.7 rating/2 share in the Nielsen rating/share for the adult 18-49 demographic. These numbers slightly decreased from the episode that aired immediately before it, "2009", which had 2.69 million viewers and a 0.8 rating/3 share.

=== Critical response ===
Lauren Hoffman from Vulture rated the combined episodes of "2009" and "Dreams Come True" at four out of five stars and summarized "Glee's later seasons have been uneven, but these final episodes get back to the core ideas the show started out with about humor in unexpected places, joy in music and dance, and the importance of working hard to create things with the people you love. It's a truly lovely send-off." Christopher Rogers from Hollywood Life stated in his review "We honestly couldn't have asked for a better, more fitting, conclusion to the show that made being a loser seem cool." The A.V. Club's Brandon Nowalk graded the two-part finale with a D, and stated the episode "doesn't have coherent plotting. It's just a bunch of events." Miranda Wicker from TV Fanatic rated the episode four out of five stars, and stated "It was all so perfect and perfectly Glee."
