= Jagged Little Tapestry =

- Glee episode
- Episode no.: Season 6 Episode 3
- Directed by: Paul McCrane
- Written by: Brad Falchuk
- Production code: 6ARC03
- Original air date: January 16, 2015

Guest appearances
- Dianna Agron as Quinn Fabray; Heather Morris as Brittany Pierce; Naya Rivera as Santana Lopez; Mark Salling as Noah "Puck" Puckerman; Jenna Ushkowitz as Tina Cohen-Chang; Max Adler as Dave Karofsky; Lauren Potter as Becky Jackson; NeNe Leakes as Coach Roz Washington; Marshall Williams as Spencer Porter; Noah Guthrie as Roderick; Billy Lewis Jr. as Mason McCarthy; Laura Dreyfuss as Madison McCarthy; Samantha Marie Ware as Jane Hayward; Justin Prentice as Darrell

Episode chronology
← Previous "Homecoming"	Next → "The Hurt Locker, Part One"
- Glee season 6

"Jagged Little Tapestry" is the third episode of the sixth season of the American musical television series Glee, and the 111th overall. The episode was written by series co-creator Brad Falchuk, directed by Paul McCrane, and first aired on January 16, 2015, on Fox in the United States.

The episode takes place as Rachel Berry and Kurt Hummel prepare an assignment for New Directions but have conflicts in their teaching styles. Kurt's breakup with Blaine Anderson brings angst to the group. Becky Jackson has a new boyfriend but has lied to him about her life, and Coach Beiste must make a difficult decision.

== Plot ==
Kurt Hummel (Chris Colfer) runs into his former fiancé Blaine Anderson (Darren Criss) and his new boyfriend Dave Karofsky (Max Adler), as Kurt is still heartbroken over their breakup. Kurt and Rachel Berry (Lea Michele) decide to use Kurt's feelings as inspiration for an assignment for New Directions, and they task the members to mashup songs from the albums Jagged Little Pill by Alanis Morissette and Tapestry by Carole King. Coach Beiste (Dot-Marie Jones) and Sam Evans (Chord Overstreet), who is now working as an assistant football coach, discuss Beiste's apparent knee issues, as she is taking multiple medications and having anger outbursts. Spencer Porter (Marshall Williams) asks for a shot at starting quarterback but is declined. Rachel and Kurt welcome back New Directions alumni Puck (Mark Salling), Quinn Fabray (Dianna Agron), Santana Lopez (Naya Rivera), Brittany Pierce (Heather Morris), and Tina Cohen-Chang (Jenna Ushkowitz) to help with the assignment and discover their teaching styles clash, as Rachel is optimistic and Kurt is realistic due to his breakup. Becky Jackson (Lauren Potter) tells Quinn and Tina that she has a new boyfriend Darrell (Justin Prentice) whom she wants to introduce to everyone, but Becky has told Darrell that she was the president of every club at McKinley High including New Directions, so Quinn and Tina agree to help her sing.

Becky introduces Darrell to Principal Sue Sylvester (Jane Lynch) who is surprised to discover that Darrell does not have Down syndrome as Becky does, and she is concerned for Becky's safety. Santana proposes marriage to Brittany and she accepts, but Kurt raises objections due to his heartbreak. Later, Santana verbally and extensively berates Kurt for his actions. Kurt apologizes to Brittany for interrupting their engagement, and Brittany reveals that Blaine and Dave are moving in together, so Kurt needs to stop feeling depressed and move on with his life. Coach Roz Washington (NeNe Leakes), Sue, Quinn, and Tina all confront Darrell about his intentions with Becky, but he makes them realize that a person with Down syndrome should be treated like everyone else and that their concerns are not valid.

Jane Hayward (Samantha Marie Ware) and Mason McCarthy (Billy Lewis Jr.) perform a duet which Rachel praises, but Kurt is again reminded of his relationship with Blaine, and he criticizes the performance. Sue confronts Coach Beiste about her medications and Beiste tells Sue that she has cancer. Becky attempts to sing for Darrell with Quinn and Tina but she cannot, and Quinn, Tina, Santana, and Brittany convince Becky that she needs to tell the truth to Darrell. Kurt apologizes to Rachel for having his feelings affect his teaching, but Rachel states that Jane and Mason appreciated the criticism and are using it to motivate them to do better. Rachel and Kurt realize that although their styles clash, together they teach well. Sue and Coach Beiste meet with Sam as Beiste finally reveals that the real reason for her medications is that she (now he) has been diagnosed with gender dysphoria and is beginning the process to undergo sex reassignment surgery. Beiste asks Sam to take over as football coach while he is away, as Sue assures Beiste his job is safe while he undergoes this process. Becky tells the truth to Darrell who accepts her apology. Rachel and Kurt tell New Directions members Jane, Mason, Madison McCarthy (Laura Dreyfuss), and Roderick (Noah Guthrie) that they are one step closer to being ready for Sectionals.

== Production ==
Returning recurring characters that appear in the episode include former New Directions members Puck (Mark Salling), Quinn Fabray (Dianna Agron), Santana Lopez (Naya Rivera), Brittany Pierce (Heather Morris), and Tina Cohen-Chang (Jenna Ushkowitz), Dave Karofsky (Max Adler), Becky Jackson (Lauren Potter), and Roz Washington (NeNe Leakes), along with new recurring characters Mason McCarthy (Billy Lewis Jr.), Madison McCarthy (Laura Dreyfuss), Jane Hayward (Samantha Marie Ware), Roderick (Noah Guthrie), and Spencer Porter (Marshall Williams). Justin Prentice is introduced as Darrell, the new boyfriend of Becky.

The episode features five musical cover versions, three of which are mashups. All featured music is from either Alanis Morissette or Carole King. "It's Too Late" by King is sung by Colfer and Criss. The mashup of Morissette's "Hand in My Pocket" and King's "I Feel the Earth Move" is sung by Rivera and Morris. The mashup of King's "Will You Love Me Tomorrow" and Morissette's "Head over Feet" is sung by Lewis Jr. and Ware. King's "So Far Away" is sung by Agron and Ushkowitz. The mashup of Morissette's "You Learn" and King's "You've Got a Friend" was sung by Michele, Colfer, Agron, Morris, Rivera, Salling, Ushkowitz, Ware, Guthrie, Lewis Jr., and Dreyfuss.

Accompanying the music from this episode, the EP Glee: The Music, Jagged Little Tapestry was released on January 16, 2015.

== Reception ==
=== Ratings ===
The episode was watched by 1.98 million viewers and received a 0.7/2 in the adult 18-49 demographic.

=== Critical response ===
Lauren Hoffman from Vulture said that this final season of Glee "is a show quietly and confidently moving back to its roots." Christopher Rogers from Hollywood Life summarized his review with "It was amazing!" The A.V. Club's Brandon Nowalk described the theme of the episode as "one other thread that runs all the way through 'Jagged Little Tapestry,' brutal honesty." Miranda Wicker from TV Fanatic stated the "writing this season is cheesier than normal and quite stilted, with "goodbye" hanging on every word."
