= Michael Arrom =

American keyboardist

Michael Everett Arrom
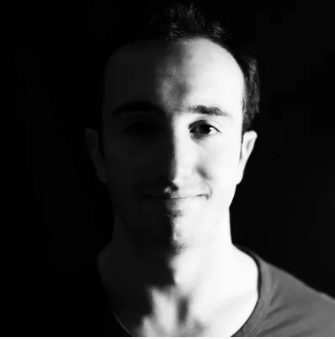
- Michael Arrom

Background information
- Born: Morristown, New Jersey, U.S.
- Origin: Cuban-American
- Genres: Pop; R&B; dance-pop
- Occupations: pianist, keyboardist, record producer
- Years active: 2012–present
- Website: michaelarrom.com

Michael Everett Arrom is an American musician, songwriter, producer and recording artist. He is best known for touring and working with several artists including Steve Vai, David Rosenthal, Keith Urban, Noah Cyrus, Sofia Carson, Madison Beer, Mike Stoller and Corky Hale.

== Biography ==
The son of Carlos and Paula Whitehorn Arrom, he was born at Morristown hospital, where his parents then lived. However, since soon after age one, he grew up in Warren Township, New Jersey, that he always considered his hometown.

He showed very precocious talent for music, starting playing piano at age 7. He attended Mt. Horeb School and the Middle School before joining The Pingry School in Basking Ridge, NJ. Meanwhile, he studied classical music under concert pianist and Carnegie Hall performer Michelle Chen Kuo and participated at the Interlochen Arts Camp in Traverse City, Michigan.

He made his national live television debut performing with Keith Urban at the American Country Awards on December 10, 2012. He was selected to appear with Keith Urban by The Grammy Foundation as a member of an alumni band created from past participants in the Grammy Camp program.

After graduating at Pingry in 2013, he was planning to major in Economics while continue pursuing music outside of classes, and he qualified for admission at Northwestern University.

The same year, however, he was introduced to Steve Vai by his mentor and Billy Joel band member, David Rosenthal, that played piano on Vai's The Story of Light album recording. Over an audition via Skype, for which Vai asked him to execute the unplayable song Angel Food, he was selected as keyboard player for The Story of light worldwide tour, that included concerts in Australia, China, Indonesia, Japan, New Zealand, South Korea, Taiwan and Thailand.

The experience prompted him to renounce to Economics studies, and pursue music as primary career. He moved to Los Angeles, where he graduated summa cum laude from the University of Southern California's cutting-edge Popular Music Program where he studied under Patrice Rushen. In 2015, he also appeared as a student musician in the episodes What the world needs now and Transitioning of the FOX Television series Glee during the final season of the show.

The following year, Arrom played a tribute concert to Jerry Leiber alongside Mike Stoller an event featuring the music of the two Songwriting Hall of Fame inductees. He also served as music director for Stoller's wife and jazz legend Corky Hale.

In 2018, he joined USC Thornton School of Music faculty as adjunct instructor of piano performance, and in the same year he appeared again on the side of Steve Vai in the framework of the Big Mama Jama Jamathon, a charity event aimed to help Extraordinary Families, a nonprofit organization of Los Angeles.

In addition to Keith Urban and Steve Vai, he worked across the years with artists like Noah Cyrus, Sofia Carson and Madison Beer. In particular, since 2018 he developed a long-term artistic fellowship with Sofia Carson, participating into TV shows like Good Morning America and Sesame Street, The Not Too Late Show with Elmo in 2020. They also joined forces for high-profile events like the UNICEF Galas in Porto Cervo (2018) and Capri (2022); and "The National Easter Egg Roll" at The White House, in April 2022
