= This Time (Glee song) =

Song by Glee cast

from the album Glee: The Music, Dreams Come True
- Released: March 17, 2015
- Genre: Pop
- Length: 4:57
- Label: Columbia; 20th Century Fox
- Songwriter: Darren Criss

"This Time" is an original song written by Darren Criss for "Dreams Come True" (2015), the series finale episode of American musical television series, Glee. It was recorded by cast member Lea Michele as her character, Rachel Berry, and is credited collectively to the Glee cast. "This Time" and the other songs performed in the episode were included on an extended play titled Glee: The Music, Dreams Come True, which was released on March 17, 2015, three days before the episode aired.

"This Time" reached number 49 on the Billboard Pop Digital Songs sales chart following the EP's release. The song received praise from critics for both Criss's thematically-appropriate songwriting and Michele's vocal performance. "This Time" was nominated for an Emmy Award for Outstanding Original Music and Lyrics at the 67th Primetime Emmy Awards in 2015.

== Background ==
Over the course of its six seasons, Glee had relied primarily on many cover versions of classic and modern songs, and also included a "handful" of its five original compositions. Earlier in 2015, Darren Criss made history as the first cast member to contribute a song to the series when "Rise" was featured on the show's season six episode, "The Rise and Fall of Sue Sylvester". Inspired by the upcoming series finale, Criss set to writing "This Time" for the express purpose of being performed on the final episode. He describes the song as a "love note to all things Glee."

== Composition ==
"This Time" was written and composed by American actor and singer Darren Criss. According to the digital sheet music published by TCF Music Publishing, the ballad was composed in the key of G major and set in common time to a "moderately slow" tempo of approximately 76 BPM. The song features a vocal range of two octaves and one note, from a low note of D_{3} to a high note of E_{5}. Lyrically, the song offers a reflection on the experiences in one's life and how those events carry with them into the future. "I wanted Rachel's words to encapsulate not only her own personal journey, but everyone's experience of being a part of this show," Criss said to Entertainment Weekly. Lori Melton of AXS TV corroborated that while the song details Rachel's personal journey, the "deeper, broader scope of the lyric" allow the song to be universally relatable.

== Critical reception ==
Heather Phares of AllMusic referred to the tune as "Rachel's... swan song" and wrote that the finale's performances were "appropriately nostalgic yet hopeful." Lori Melton of AXS TV wrote that Darren Criss "could not have written a more beautiful musical sendoff to all that "Glee" is and... stands for," and also complimented Michele's "incomparable" vocals and "skillful" storytelling. In her review of "Dreams Come True", Lauren Hoffman of Vulture.com wrote that the song "works on pretty much every level it needs to."

=== Accolades ===
"This Time" received a nomination in the category of Outstanding Original Music and Lyrics at the 67th Primetime Emmy Awards. "This Time" won the award for original song in the category of TV Show or Digital Series at the 2015 Hollywood Music in Media Awards.

== Charts ==
Chart (2015)	Peak position
US Pop Digital Songs (Billboard)	49
