= Burt Hummel =

Fictional character from the Fox series Glee

- Glee character
- Mike O'Malley as Burt Hummel in Glee
- First appearance: "Preggers" (2009)
- Last appearance: "Dreams Come True" (2015)
- Created by: Ryan Murphy; Brad Falchuk; Ian Brennan
- Portrayed by: Mike O'Malley

In-universe information
- Occupation: Mechanic; Member of Congress
- Spouses: Unnamed wife (widowed); Carole Hudson (2010-present)
- Children: Kurt Hummel; Finn Hudson (stepson, deceased)
- Relatives: Blaine Anderson (son-in-law)

Burt Hummel is a fictional character from the Fox musical comedy-drama series Glee. The character is portrayed by actor Mike O'Malley, and first appeared on Glee in the fourth episode of the first season, "Preggers". Burt was developed by Glee creators Ryan Murphy, Brad Falchuk and Ian Brennan. He is the father of gay glee club member Kurt Hummel (Chris Colfer), and works as a mechanic in Lima, Ohio, where the series is set. He eventually begins a relationship with Carole Hudson (Romy Rosemont), the mother of another glee club member, Finn Hudson (Cory Monteith), and the two marry in the second season episode "Furt". In the third season, Burt runs in a special congressional election and wins. O'Malley was a recurring cast member during the first season, and was upgraded to a series regular for the second season of the show, but returned to the recurring cast for the third season onward.

The character has been well received by critics, particularly for his loving acceptance and support for his gay son. James Poniewozik of Time wrote, "the fact that Dad (Mike O'Malley, who has turned out to be a pretty good character actor) ends up not being the boor we think he's going to be is one of the first signs that Glee is growing up as a series, that having established a world of primary-color stereotypes, it's now willing to subvert those expectations." IGN's Robert Canning commented that the Hummels' relationship is "the most affecting" of the show, and praised O'Malley's "outstandingly nuanced" performance as Burt. Murphy has said, "Mike's talent is deep. I will always write for Mike O'Malley." O'Malley was nominated for the Primetime Emmy Award for Outstanding Guest Actor – Comedy Series in 2010 for his portrayal of Burt.

== Storylines ==
=== Season 1 ===
Burt first appears in "Preggers", the show's fourth episode. He catches his son Kurt dancing to Beyoncé's "Single Ladies", and Kurt claims that it is a football exercise, and that he is now a kicker on the William McKinley High football team. Fortunately for Kurt, fellow glee club member and football quarterback Finn Hudson (Cory Monteith) helps him get a tryout for the team, and he becomes its kicker in reality. Burt attends Kurt's first game, and after a final-second touchdown ties the game, Kurt kicks the extra point to win it. Buoyed by his success, Kurt comes out to his father. Burt tells him he knew all along Kurt was gay and loves him just as much.

When Kurt is upset at not being considered for the solo on "Defying Gravity" in the episode "Wheels"—the song, originally written for a female character in the musical Wicked, is initially given to Rachel (Lea Michele)—Burt complains to Principal Figgins (Iqbal Theba) that his son is being discriminated against, and Kurt is allowed to audition. Burt receives an anonymous abusive phone call about his son's sexual orientation, and when Kurt sees how upset his father is, he deliberately sabotages his audition to spare Burt more pain.

Kurt sets Burt up with Finn's widowed mother Carole (Romy Rosemont) in the episode "Home", hoping it will help him become closer to Finn, who he has a crush on. The relationship has become serious before Finn finds out about it, and he is initially hostile to it, but begins to bond with Burt over sports when the two families go out to dinner. It is implied that Burt's motivation to build a connection with Finn is more out of his knowledge that Finn never had a father to do things with, and not favoritism over his own son. However, Kurt feels left out, and later asks Finn to help him break up their parents. Finn initially agrees, but changes his mind after Burt tells him that he loves Carole and would never hurt her. In "Laryngitis", Kurt feels increasingly jealous of how much time Burt is spending with Finn, so he attempts to emulate Burt's personality to regain Burt's attention. When Burt takes Finn to yet another event without including Kurt, a hurt and angry Kurt drops his emulation of his father and sings "Rose's Turn". Burt overhears his performance, praises Kurt's singing and apologizes for not spending enough time with him. He assures Kurt that he still loves him and always will, no matter what his son chooses to be.

In the episode "Theatricality", Burt invites Carole and Finn to move in with him and Kurt. Aware of Kurt's attraction to him, Finn is uncomfortable with sharing a bedroom with Kurt. In the hopes of pleasing Finn, Kurt redecorates their bedroom, but Finn is appalled by its fancy appearance and lack of privacy. During the ensuing argument, when Kurt refuses to acknowledge his infatuation, Finn loses his temper and calls the new furnishings "faggy". Burt overhears Finn's homophobic words, delivers a stinging reprimand, and throws him out, even though doing so risks costing Burt his relationship with Carole. However, later on Burt is also disappointed with Kurt when he finds out from Carole that Kurt's ulterior motive for setting them up was so he could get closer to Finn, and that while he accepts him for being gay, he does not accept him pursuing a straight boy who he knows does not feel the same way.

=== Season 2 ===
Burt suffers a heart attack brought on by a severe arrhythmia in the third episode of the second season, "Grilled Cheesus", and is in a coma for several days before recovering consciousness. Kurt is at his bedside when he finally wakes, and takes charge of his father's recovery once Burt is back home. The eighth episode, entitled "Furt", opens with Burt and Carole telling their sons that they are engaged. Kurt insists that New Directions perform at the wedding and reception. At the wedding, New Directions perform "Marry You" by Bruno Mars as they, and then Burt and Carole, dance down the aisle. The couple marry, but use their honeymoon savings to transfer Kurt to Dalton Academy when a homophobic bully who has threatened Kurt's life is allowed to resume attending McKinley High.

The Hummel and Hudson households combine subsequent to the marriage. After Kurt and his friend Blaine (Darren Criss) attend a party where Blaine gets drunk, Kurt drives them to his own house, and the two sleep, fully clothed, in Kurt's bed. Burt discovers Blaine there in the morning, and later tells Kurt that this was inappropriate behavior. Kurt apologizes, but asks Burt to learn about homosexual relationships so if Kurt has questions, he can ask Burt like a boy would normally ask his father. As it turns out, Kurt is quite ignorant about sexual matters and refuses to educate himself; this so alarms Blaine that he asks Burt to consider broaching the subject with Kurt, citing safety concerns. Burt subsequently gives Kurt "the talk" about sex. He later reluctantly agrees to Kurt's return to McKinley High, and recommends that Kurt dress less flamboyantly for the McKinley junior prom, a suggestion endorsed by Kurt's new boyfriend and date, Blaine. Their advice is rejected, and at the prom Kurt is appalled to discover that he has been named prom queen.

=== Season 3 ===
Ishe causes official funding for the school musical—which Kurt has been cast in—to be withdrawn, but Burt arranges for alternative funding from businesses in the community, and rescues the musical from cancellation. Burt decides to wage a write-in campaign against Sue, who has built up a considerable lead against her rivals in the special congressional election, and makes clear his support for the arts. Sue wages a highly negative campaign, airing outrageous ads about Burt, but doing so ultimately backfires when another candidate in the race airs attack ads against her. Burt wins the election in "I Kissed a Girl". After the election, he divides his time between Washington and Lima. He intervenes twice with his stepson Finn: first, to find out why Finn wants to enlist in the army, and again when Finn later becomes engaged to Rachel, in the hopes of causing the two to reconsider, or at least to delay their wedding plans. He and Kurt celebrate when the latter becomes a drama school finalist, and attends with Carole both the Regionals show choir competition and the graduation of their two sons.

=== Season 4 ===
In the first episode of the fourth season, Burt gives Kurt an emotional sendoff when his son leaves for New York City. Burt travels to New York to surprise Kurt at Christmas in "Glee, Actually", bringing Blaine with him, and the three spend Christmas together. During his visit, Burt reveals that he has been diagnosed with prostate cancer, but his chances of survival are very high as the diagnosis was made early and treatment appears to have been successful. Several months later, his doctor confirms that he is cancer free. During the season finale, he is approached by Blaine who wants his permission to marry Kurt. Burt tells him that he while he does understand why he wants to get married, he believes that both Blaine and his son are too young to make that kind of step.

=== Season 5 ===
Burt drives Kurt to Blaine's "secret" marriage proposal at Dalton Academy in the season premiere. Kurt, who is aware of the proposal, asks his father for advice on what he should do. He tells Kurt the story about how he met his mother when he was twenty-two, and married her six months later. While married life was not easy, he says there is nothing he would change. In "The Quarterback", Burt is shown with Kurt and Carole after the death of Finn as they attempt to clean out Finn's room. He decides to keep the football from Kurt's first game, and the lamp from Kurt's basement re-decoration. He expresses his grief by saying that he should have hugged Finn more, and comforts Carole when she starts to break down. When New Directions dedicates their Nationals Show Choir Competition performance to Finn, they invite Carole and Burt to accompany them to Los Angeles for the event.

=== Season 6 ===
Burt first appears in "A Wedding". Rachel does not want to sit next to Sam Evans (Chord Overstreet) at Santana Lopez (Naya Rivera) and Brittany Pierce's (Heather Morris) wedding. She states that Burt and Carole will be there, and that she hasn't been talking with them recently (presumably since Finn's death), and doesn't want to hurt them. Mercedes Jones (Amber Riley) reassures her that they'll want her to move on, just like they did with their first spouses' death. They both indeed support her to find love again with Sam. He officiates the wedding, which much to his surprise, his son is also getting married. He is in the flashback episode "2009", which is set during the same time period as the show's pilot episode. Burt is contacted by McKinley High counsellor Emma Pillsbury (Jayma Mays) to tell him that Kurt seemed to be isolated and had shown interest in a pamphlet on suicide. Burt tells Kurt that he must join a school team within a week, or face punishment. Although Burt had meant a sports team, when Kurt enthusiastically tells Burt that he has joined the glee club, he accepts this as an adequate substitute in part due to its competitive aspect. In the show's final episode, "Dreams Come True", Burt and Carole attend the rededication ceremony of the McKinley High auditorium in the year 2020, when it is renamed the "Finn Hudson Memorial Auditorium". He enjoys the final performance from the New Directions of all generations and takes a bow with the other Glee Cast members.

== Development ==
=== Creation and characterization ===
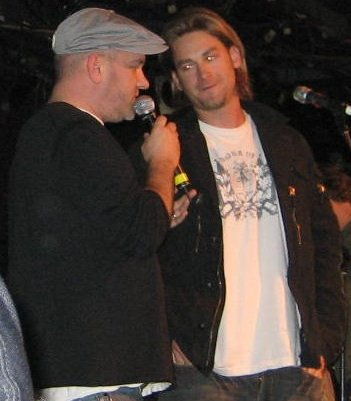
Mike O'Malley (pictured, left) plays Burt Hummel on Glee.

Murphy created Burt as "a working-class dude who's not okay with his son being gay, a guy who's having a tough time." The character is loosely based on his own father. He had O'Malley in mind when casting the role, and felt confident about his capability: "It's a real tour de force role and I knew what Mike could do. This isn't an after-school special. ... It's heavy and Mike has the ability to cut through the sentiment." He went on to say, "Mike's talent is deep. I will always write for Mike O'Malley." The actor did not have to audition, and was invited to read for the part by Murphy personally. The two men, along with Falchuk, had previously worked together on the television movie Pretty/Handsome. While reading the first twenty pages of script, O'Malley was not initially enthusiastic about playing the role, as the character appeared to be an intolerant stereotype. He changed his mind, however, after realizing that Burt was to be portrayed as a more accepting man, with "grace and love that comes first for his son."

After appearing in five Glee episodes over the course of the first season, O'Malley was upgraded to a series regular along with Heather Morris and Naya Rivera in the show's second season. Murphy confirmed this fact on July 13, 2010, in the wake of O'Malley's nomination for an Emmy Award for his work in the role of Burt. He appeared in eight season two episodes, and is guaranteed at least six episodes during the third season. In early 2011, O'Malley was cast in the lead role in a comedy pilot entitled Family Album, which prompted media speculation that his role as Burt might need to be reduced. In actuality, the actor ensured that he would be able to meet his six-episode commitment to Glee should the pilot be picked up for a full series run, and commented: "[Burt] is one of the best parts I've ever had in my life. I don't want to leave it behind until it's run its course or the story has run its course." On August 11, 2011, Fox announced that Family Album would not be made into a series. Although there was no announcement about a change in O'Malley's status on Glee, the press release for the first episode of the show's third season omitted O'Malley's name from the regular cast, and the one for the second episode has him listed as part of the guest cast.

Burt is a mechanic, and has several times been shown working on cars. He is the majority owner of his tire business, Hummel Tires & Lube. When he was younger, he went to junior college, where he played football before injuring his knee in an accident. He is a sports enthusiast, and also likes basketball and baseball in addition to football. Arts critic Ken Tucker detailed Burt's early development in the series with the observation:

Burt Hummel is a working-class guy who, we've come to think, has overcome what must have been a lifetime of casual conversational gay-bashing to fully accept his son Kurt's sexuality. Early on in Glee, Burt was a red-herring character: We thought he was there to be a boorish lumpenproletariat who'd provide dramatic friction between father and son. But the producers went in another direction, one reflecting the idea that being a good parent means learning a lot from your child, as well as the other way around.

— Ken Tucker, Entertainment Weekly

=== Relationships ===
Burt is the father of glee club member Kurt Hummel. Colfer has credited his off-screen relationship with O'Malley with improving the quality of their scenes together, and O'Malley has said the same about working with Colfer. Burt loves Kurt, and openly accepts his son after Kurt tells him that he is gay in the show's fourth episode, "Preggers". Murphy took the scene verbatim from his own experience of coming out to his father. He called the father-son relationship "One of the stories that we really love on the show", and one that is "very personal" to him, as he wishes his own father had acted more like Burt. During the first season, Kurt has cause to wonder whether his father truly accepts him. Colfer offered the insight that his character is "more concerned with being OK in his dad's eyes than with anyone else", and said that the bond between them would continue to strengthen as the series progressed. From O'Malley's point of view, "There's a lot at stake in their relationship and [we're] trying to show other people how it can be, in a positive way. I'm not saying hey, let's go to Greenwich Village and be in the parade. This is very very difficult, but he loves his son."

Burt is shown to have deeply loved his first wife, Kurt's mother, a strong woman who died eight years prior to the premiere of the show. He later characterizes his life after losing her as "being asleep". Kurt introduces him to Carole Hudson, Finn's widowed mother, and they begin dating. He falls in love with her and she with him: he tells Finn that she is an "angel who came down to wake me up after all these years". At Carole's behest, Burt becomes something of a father figure to Finn, taking him to ball games, though this development does not sit well with Kurt, who works to win his father's attention back from Finn by emulating his father's dress and interests before Burt realizes how hurt Kurt is. The relationship between Burt and Carole progresses to the point that they decide to live together, and she and Finn move in with the Hummels, since their house is the larger of the two. However, after Finn uses a homophobic slur against Kurt, Burt tells Finn that his behavior is unacceptable and he cannot live in the house any more, imperiling his romance with Carole. Following his appearance in this episode, O'Malley spoke of future reconciliation between Burt and Finn. He stated, "One of the things I think is really important in life and for human beings is to forgive and be able to rise up from our mistakes. I'm hoping that Finn and Burt are able to cross that chasm."

The couple apparently continues to date, however—Carole visits Burt's bedside when he is comatose in the hospital after his heart attack—and in "Furt" he proposes to Carole, she accepts, and they wed. The families combine under the same roof soon thereafter.

== Reception ==
=== Critical response ===
The character of Burt has been well received by critics. James Poniewozik of Time deemed Kurt's coming out "beautifully handled", and wrote, "the fact that Dad (Mike O'Malley, who has turned out to be a pretty good character actor) ends up not being the boor we think he's going to be is one of the first signs that Glee is growing up as a series, that having established a world of primary-color stereotypes, it's now willing to subvert those expectations."

Burt's defense of Kurt from a slur by Finn in "Theatricality" was called "one of the heaviest scenes Glee has ever delved into" by Eric Goldman of IGN. Tim Stack of Entertainment Weekly called the scene "utterly heartbreaking and lovely". He added, "it was an amazing moment for Glee, capped off by the simple gesture of Burt grabbing his son's shoulder in an act of support. Mike O'Malley is completely Emmy-worthy. We've never seen a character like this before on television or seen such a relationship between a father and son." Poniewozik wrote, "Mike O'Malley, as always, made me believe that Burt was not speaking out of some false enlightenment but out of a desire to protect his family and a struggle to do the right thing." BuddyTV's Henrik Batallones said O'Malley was "the star of the show".

While the second-season episode "Grilled Cheesus" received mixed reviews from television critics, O'Malley was praised for his contribution. Robert Canning of IGN commented that the Hummels' relationship is "the most affecting" of the show, and praised O'Malley's "outstandingly nuanced" performance as Burt. Stack lauded the performances by Colfer and O'Malley as being Emmy-worthy, and observed that in the wake of a spate of suicides by gay youths, "the social importance of a show that promotes a message of tolerance and support—and of characters who drive that message home as powerfully as Kurt and Burt Hummel—cannot be underestimated."

Burt and Carole's wedding featured in an Entertainment Weekly piece on "23 Wonderful TV Weddings". Stack called their dance down the aisle "utterly joyous and sweet, a showcase for how music can transform everyday events." He added that their "individual vows [were] really lovely, even though they did seem to be more about their kids than their significant others". TV Guide listed it amongst "The Most Memorable TV Weddings", and commented "If you made it through the vows without shedding a tear you have no soul." Emily VanDerWerff of The A.V. Club praised the "genuinely sweet chemistry" between O'Malley and Rosemont, and found the processional dance "nicely moving" though unoriginal. She too commented on the focus on Kurt and Finn in their vows, but conceded, "if you'd been a single parent that long, you'd probably talk about your kids a lot too." He expanded:

What rang through this scene was always the sense that these two people had given up on having something like this for themselves again until they abruptly found it staring them in the face. O'Malley and Rosemont emanate that sense of stunned luckiness, of finding the love of your life all over again after you've stopped looking, and the whole act featuring the wedding is one of the show's finest accomplishments.

— Emily VanDerWerff, The A.V. Club.

In the episode "Sexy", reviewers acclaimed the scene where Burt gives Kurt "the talk" about sex. Poniewozik wrote, "O'Malley, who really seems to exist in a different emotional dimension from most of Glee's adults, sells both Burt's determination and awkwardness in helping his son", and Entertainment Weekly's Sandra Gonzalez declared, "I've never loved a father-son pair on television more than I love these two". She also noted, "Awkward to watch as it was, it was another really great moment between the two".

=== Accolades ===
On July 8, 2010, O'Malley received a nomination for the Primetime Emmy Award for Outstanding Guest Actor – Comedy Series for playing Burt. On August 8, 2010, he was named the winner in the 2010 Teen Choice Awards, Choice TV: Parental Unit category. At the 17th Screen Actors Guild Awards, O'Malley was included in the Glee cast's ensemble nomination for Outstanding Performance by an Ensemble in a Comedy Series.
