= 2009 (Glee) =

- Glee episode
- Episode no.: Season 6 Episode 12
- Directed by: Paris Barclay
- Written by: Ryan Murphy; Brad Falchuk; Ian Brennan
- Production code: 6ARC09
- Original air date: March 20, 2015

Guest appearances
- Jessalyn Gilsig as Terri Schuester; Jayma Mays as Emma Pillsbury; Mike O'Malley as Burt Hummel; Mark Salling as Noah "Puck" Puckerman; Jenna Ushkowitz as Tina Cohen-Chang; Iqbal Theba as Principal Figgins; Max Adler as Dave Karofsky; Kent Avenido as Howard Bamboo; Natalija Nogulich (credit only); Dijon Talton as Matt Rutherford; April Grace as Mercedes' church choir director; Bex Taylor-Klaus as Tina's goth friend

Episode chronology
| ← Previous "We Built This Glee Club" | Next → "Dreams Come True" |
- Glee season 6

"2009" is the twelfth episode of the sixth season of the American musical television series Glee, its penultimate episode and the 120th episode overall. Written by the show's co-creators Ryan Murphy, Brad Falchuk, and Ian Brennan and directed by Paris Barclay, it aired on Fox in the United States on March 20, 2015, along with the next episode, "Dreams Come True", as a special two-hour season and series finale. The episode features a flashback to six years ago from the show's pilot episode that explores the reasons why the original five members of the New Directions glee club decided to join.

== Plot ==
In 2009, Will Schuester (Matthew Morrison) announces to his wife Terri Schuester (Jessalyn Gilsig) that he is now running the McKinley High glee club.

Kurt Hummel (Chris Colfer) is depressed as he starts his second year at McKinley High. Guidance Counselor Emma Pillsbury (Jayma Mays) notices him looking at a pamphlet about suicide, and calls his father Burt Hummel (Mike O'Malley) to the school. Afterward, Burt tells Kurt that he has to join a team by the end of the week and start making friends.

At lunch, Kurt sits at a table with Rachel Berry (Lea Michele), and tells her that he needs to join a club; after finding out that he can sing, she suggests the new glee club. The two of them meet and sing but when Kurt suggests they audition together, Rachel refuses: stars shine separately, and she plans to shine. Kurt then asks Mercedes Jones (Amber Riley) for advice, since he has heard that she is a star of her church choir, and also recruits her to audition for the glee club. He auditions, and tells his father that he has joined the club. Burt is unsure but happy for his son, but Kurt hesitates to tell his dad that he is gay.

Rachel tries to befriend Mercedes, and asks to come to her church to hear her sing. When she does, Rachel is worried, and tells Mercedes that she has a great future as a soul singer, but Mercedes tells her that whatever type of music is being sung, Rachel will have to compete with her for it.

Tina Cohen-Chang (Jenna Ushkowitz) is rebelling by using a fake stutter to drive most people away, and dressing as a goth. She is friends with Artie Abrams (Kevin McHale), who really likes her as she is the only one at the school who treats him like a regular human being despite his being in a wheelchair. In the cafeteria, a couple of Tina's goth friends dump food on Rachel and Kurt as a dare, and one dares Tina and Artie back to try out for the glee club. They both do, supporting each other, and each is impressed by the other's singing ability.

The first meeting of New Directions is a tense one: Will gives the first solo to Artie, but Rachel insists that she should be getting the solos as she has the best voice, a claim immediately disputed by Mercedes. That night, Terri finds Will working on music for the glee club, and she is concerned that Will's commitment to glee club may cause future issues with their marriage, but Will promises to put her first. Rachel is pleased when Will gives her the next solo, but Mercedes is very upset. She is talked out of quitting by her church choir director (April Grace), who urges her to stay, and predicts that competing with Rachel will ultimately make Mercedes a better singer.

Principal Figgins (Iqbal Theba) and Sue Sylvester (Jane Lynch) praise Sue's leadership of the Cheerios cheerleaders to five consecutive national championships. Sue wonders about the revival of glee club, but Figgins assures her that they are of no concern and that Sue and the Cheerios will always be the center of McKinley High. During her weekly one-on-one basketball game with Will, Sue tells him that it is wrong to encourage the dreams of such young minds, but Will disagrees, and says that glee club could be even more important than cheerleading. Sue gives him an ultimatum: her friendship or the glee club. Will picks the glee club, adding that he just recruited Finn Hudson (Cory Monteith), the quarterback of the football team. Sue is furious.

Hearing that Terri is pregnant and that Will may be leaving as glee club director to become an accountant, Rachel goes to see Terri to convince her that Will needs to stay at McKinley. Terri is not persuaded in the least. Mercedes and Kurt are having issues with Finn, which they talk over at a coffee shop, where Mercedes has a chance encounter with Blaine Anderson (Darren Criss). Artie, Kurt, Mercedes, Rachel, and Tina meet on whether or not to kick out Finn, but they realize that he belongs in glee club as much as they do, and they unanimously vote to keep him in. Emma begs Figgins to give Will a raise so that he can stay on as glee club coach, but Figgins instead finds an old video of Will competing in a glee club championship, which Emma shows to Will. Sue congratulates Will on his departure from teaching, but as he is leaving, he hears the sound of the glee club singing "Don't Stop Believin'" in the auditorium, and he stays to watch them.

== Production ==
Although this was the twelfth episode aired in the sixth season, it was the ninth episode to be produced. It was initially announced as airing ninth, set for February 27, 2015, but was rescheduled as part of the finale. The episode was written by the show's three co-creators, Ryan Murphy, Brad Falchuk, and Ian Brennan, and directed by Paris Barclay, who described it as the "most unusual episode of Glee I have ever directed".

The episode was filmed in early December 2014. The filmed material is supplemented by the inclusion of the entire original performance of "Don't Stop Believin'" from Glee's pilot episode, which features Cory Monteith and Lea Michele on lead vocals.

Recurring characters appearing in this episode include new McKinley High glee club member Tina Cohen-Chang (Ushkowitz), students Noah "Puck" Puckerman (Salling), Dave Karofsky (Max Adler) and Matt Rutherford (Dijon Talton), guidance counsellor Emma Pillsbury (Mays), Principal Figgins (Theba), Will's wife Terri Schuester (Gilsig), Kurt's father Burt Hummel (O'Malley) and Terri's co-worker Howard Bamboo (Kent Avenido). New characters introduced for this episode were April Grace as Mercedes' church choir director and Bex Taylor-Klaus as a goth student. Natalija Nogulich, while given a guest star credit, does not appear in the broadcast episode. Dianna Agron as Quinn Fabray and Naya Rivera as Santana Lopez appear in the footage from the pilot episode performance of "Don't Stop Believin'", but are not credited.

Five of the six songs from the episode have been released on a digital five-track EP with the title Glee: The Music, 2009. These are: "Popular" from the musical Wicked sung by Michele and Colfer, Zella Jackson Price's "I'm His Child" performed by Riley, Katy Perry's "I Kissed a Girl" sung by Ushkowitz, Ginuwine's "Pony" performed by McHale, and Journey's "Don't Stop Believin'" in the original version from the pilot episode of the series. The sixth song, "Mister Cellophane" from the musical Chicago sung by Colfer, is not on the EP.

== Reception ==
=== Ratings ===
The episode was broadcast an hour earlier than the show's usual Friday timeslot, with the second episode and series finale airing in that usual timeslot. "2009" received a season high 0.8/3 Nielsen rating/share in the 18–49 demographic and attracted 2.69 million American viewers during its initial broadcast. Its ratings and viewership were higher than the final episode of the series, "Dreams Come True", which aired immediately after and was watched by 2.54 million viewers and received a 0.7/2 rating/share.

=== Critical response ===
Andy Swift of TVLine wrote that the episode "tackled flawlessly" the "tricky" task of doing a flashback to the year 2009 without Cory Monteith, who had played Finn Hudson until his death in 2013, both in alluding to "iconic moments" in the pilot and by mentioning Finn at a number of points in the dialogue. He described the inclusion of the "Don't Stop Believin'" footage from pilot as "absolutely gut wrenching in every sense of the word". Time's James Poniewozik wrote that it was an "ingenious move" to make the episode "essentially an alternative version" of the Glee pilot, which had been "one of the best TV pilots of the last decade". He called the episode "sweet and nostalgic and tearjerking".
