= Beiste (Glee) =

Fictional character from the Fox series Glee

Sheldon (previously Shannon) Beiste
- Glee character
- Dot-Marie Jones as coach Sheldon Beiste in Glee
- First appearance: "Audition" (2010)
- Last appearance: "Dreams Come True" (2015)
- Created by: Ryan Murphy; Brad Falchuk; Ian Brennan
- Portrayed by: Dot-Marie Jones

In-universe information
- Occupation: High school football coach
- Family: Denise Beiste (sister)
- Spouse: Cooter Menkins (divorced)

Coach Beiste is a fictional character from the Fox musical comedy-drama series Glee, portrayed by actress Dot-Marie Jones. The character appeared in Glee from its second season premiere "Audition", first broadcast on September 21, 2010.

Coach Beiste is originally presented as a heterosexual, cisgender, and gender non-conforming woman. However, in the sixth season, it is revealed to the audience that Coach Beiste is actually a gay and transgender man. After revealing that he is transgender, Beiste undergoes gender confirmation surgery and changes his first name to Sheldon. A championship-winning football coach, Beiste is brought in to make the McKinley High football team successful. He immediately comes into conflict with cheerleading coach Sue Sylvester (Jane Lynch) and glee club director Will Schuester (Matthew Morrison), though Beiste and Will eventually become good friends. In his first year, Beiste successfully steers the team to its first championship. When the character returns in the third season, in addition to coaching football, Beiste co-directs the school musical and runs the elections for senior class president. His first boyfriend is Ohio State football recruiter Cooter Menkins (Eric Bruskotter), though he initially faces competition from Sue for him. Beiste and Cooter eventually marry, and he later finds support from Sue after becoming the victim of domestic abuse, ultimately leaving and then divorcing Cooter.

A recurring role starting in the second season, Jones as Beiste was promoted to the main cast in the sixth and final season. Jones received Emmy nominations in 2011, 2012, and 2013 for Outstanding Guest Actress in a Comedy Series for her work as Beiste in Glee's second, third and fourth seasons respectively. Beiste's season two storyline in the episode Jones submitted for final judging—"Never Been Kissed"—was criticized by many reviewers, though they lauded her acting. Beiste in the third season has been described as "believable and heartfelt", and Jones as "brilliant".

== Storylines ==
=== Season 2 ===
In the second season of Glee, Coach Beiste (Dot-Marie Jones) is introduced as the new football coach for the McKinley High Titans in the premiere episode, "Audition". He comes to William McKinley High with an enviable record of coaching successful football teams, and Principal Figgins (Iqbal Theba) boosts the football program budget to support the new coach by reducing the cheerleading and glee club budgets, which alarms coach Sue Sylvester (Jane Lynch) and director Will Schuester (Matthew Morrison), respectively, and drives them into a temporary alliance against Beiste. The coach is dismayed by their rudeness, but forgives Will when he apologizes and goes on to develop a friendship with him. Beiste contemplates resigning as coach upon learning that several students have been fantasizing about him in order to curb their arousal while making out. Will has the students apologize and earn Beiste's forgiveness. Will also learns that Beiste has never been kissed, which leads to him giving the coach a first kiss as a friendly gesture. He later helps the glee club members preserve Brittany's (Heather Morris) continued belief in Santa Claus: disguised as Santa, he explains to Brittany why her wish that paraplegic boyfriend Artie (Kevin McHale) be made to walk cannot be granted; later, Brittany anonymously receives a ReWalk to allow Artie to walk for short periods of time. When antagonism flares between the football team's glee and non-glee factions, Beiste forces the entire football team to work together with the glee club for one week; despite encountering resistance and set-backs, the plan is ultimately successful and the team wins the championship game. During the episode "Blame It on the Alcohol", Beiste takes Will out for a fun time at a rodeo bar, which includes the character's first lead vocal performance on the show in the duet "One Bourbon, One Scotch, One Beer".

=== Season 3 ===
In the third season, Beiste continues as football coach, and is recruited by Will to co-direct the school musical West Side Story with guidance counselor Emma Pillsbury (Jayma Mays) and Artie. He orders the football team to play the Jets in the show. Beiste also takes on the task of running the school elections. In the episode "The First Time", he begins dating Ohio State football recruiter Cooter Menkins (Eric Bruskotter), who is scouting for talent at McKinley, but discovers in "I Kissed a Girl" that Sue has become a rival for Cooter's affections just as Beiste begins to fall in love with him, thus prompting the character's first solo song, "Jolene". He later tells Emma and Sue, in episode "Yes/No", that he and Cooter have impulsively gotten married. A few months later, in the episode "Choke", Beiste is hit by Cooter and given a black eye. Although initially convinced by Sue and Roz Washington (NeNe Leakes) to leave for his own safety, the coach later returns home to give Cooter a second chance, before ultimately leaving him and giving back his wedding ring. The catalyst for the final break is Puck (Mark Salling), a football player and glee club member. Beiste stops a fight between Puck and another student: Puck is wielding a knife, and the coach berates him for doing something so stupid. Puck calls himself a loser, and starts crying; Beiste cries with him, saying that no one ever thinks the two of them hurt because they are "badasses", but they do. He arranges for Puck to retake a geography exam he flunked, which is keeping him from graduating high school, and helps him study for it; he passes and graduates. In the interim, he helps chaperone New Directions on their trip to Chicago, where they win the national show choir championship.

=== Season 4 ===
Beiste first appears in "The Role You Were Born to Play", helping Finn when he goes looking for a jock to play the lead in the school musical. He continues to advise Finn when Beiste takes charge of the glee club for the duration of Will's stay in Washington while he serves on a blue-ribbon arts panel. He also acts as faculty advisor to the school's superheroes club. When Sam (Chord Overstreet) and Brittany think the Mayan apocalypse is imminent and decide to get married, Beiste offers to marry them, but makes sure to perform a ceremony that is not valid legally. When the apocalypse does not happen, they are relieved when he tells them that they are not, in fact, married. Later in the season, after Emma leaves Will at the altar on their wedding day and the two are briefly estranged, Beiste confesses to falling in love with him, but he tells the coach that he and Emma have recently gotten back together. Will asks a hurt Beiste to come to glee club; he does so reluctantly, but as the period begins, two gunshots are heard in the school, and he assists in barricading the choir room, helping to keep everyone quiet, and aiding Will in subduing Sam when he wants to go out and search for Brittany, who was not in the room when the lockdown began. Afterward, Beiste tells Will that he should reach out to forgive Finn, whose role as Will's assistant on the glee club was terminated when Finn admitted to kissing Emma while Will was in Washington, and he does so.

=== Season 5 ===
Finn's death hits Beiste hard, and when Puck comes into the locker room drunk, weeks after the funeral and saying that he is lost without Finn, Beiste tells him he needs to take charge of his life and give himself the advice and guidance he would have gotten from his best friend. The two cry over their loss. Later, the two gather at Finn's outdoor memorial at McKinley, which includes a tree that Puck had stolen as a memento and later replanted at Beiste's behest, and Puck tells the coach that he has decided to join the Air Force.

=== Season 6 ===
In "Jagged Little Tapestry," Beiste is acting strangely, worrying Sam Evans, who is now the assistant football coach, and principal Sue Sylvester. He ultimately meets with them both to explain he is suffering from gender dysphoria and asks Sam to take over as football coach during his impending transition to male. Sue promises Beiste her full support, and tells the coach that his position will be waiting for him on his return. He returns as Sheldon Beiste in "Transitioning".

== Development ==
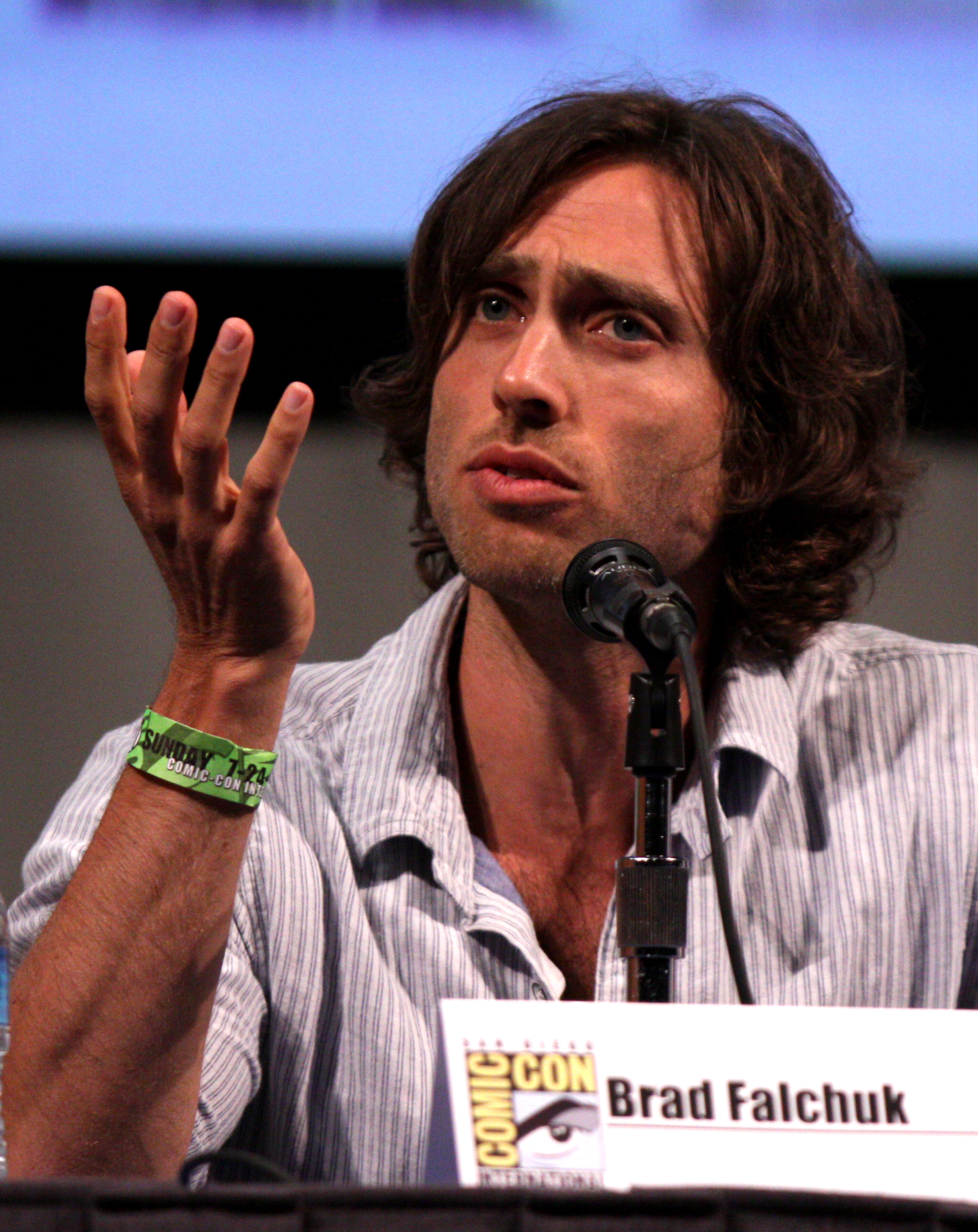
Coach Beiste was created for Jones following a chance supermarket conversation with Glee co-creator Brad Falchuk (pictured).

Sheldon Beiste is played by actress Dot-Marie Jones, who first appeared in the second season premiere episode "Audition". Beiste was established immediately as a character who could go toe-to-toe with cheerleading coach Sue Sylvester, and as a highly competent football coach with an enviable record of championships. One article described Beiste as a "wounded giant—a 40-year-old who'd never been kissed", and Jones's portrayal of him as "humorous and heart-wrenching".

Jones had previously worked with Glee co-creators Ryan Murphy and Brad Falchuk on Nip/Tuck, and when she encountered Falchuk at a local supermarket she says she told him, "'Write me something', just joking, you know, but not really." Still, she was shocked to hear from her agent two months later that Murphy had done so. She knew very little about the role initially: "When I signed my contract, it didn't even have a character name—just two quotation marks."

Jones was a student and professional athlete—she played several sports in high school, received a track scholarship to Fresno State University, came in sixth in shot put at the 1988 Olympic trials and "won 15 world arm wrestling championships"—and for the role she drew on her experience from having worked "four and half years in lockdown at the Juvenile Hall in Fresno with adolescent offenders".

In her acting career, Jones has "played every tough chick possible", and in early 2012 described the role of Beiste as one "where I still get to be the tough coach, but be vulnerable, have heart and have a love interest".

== Reception ==
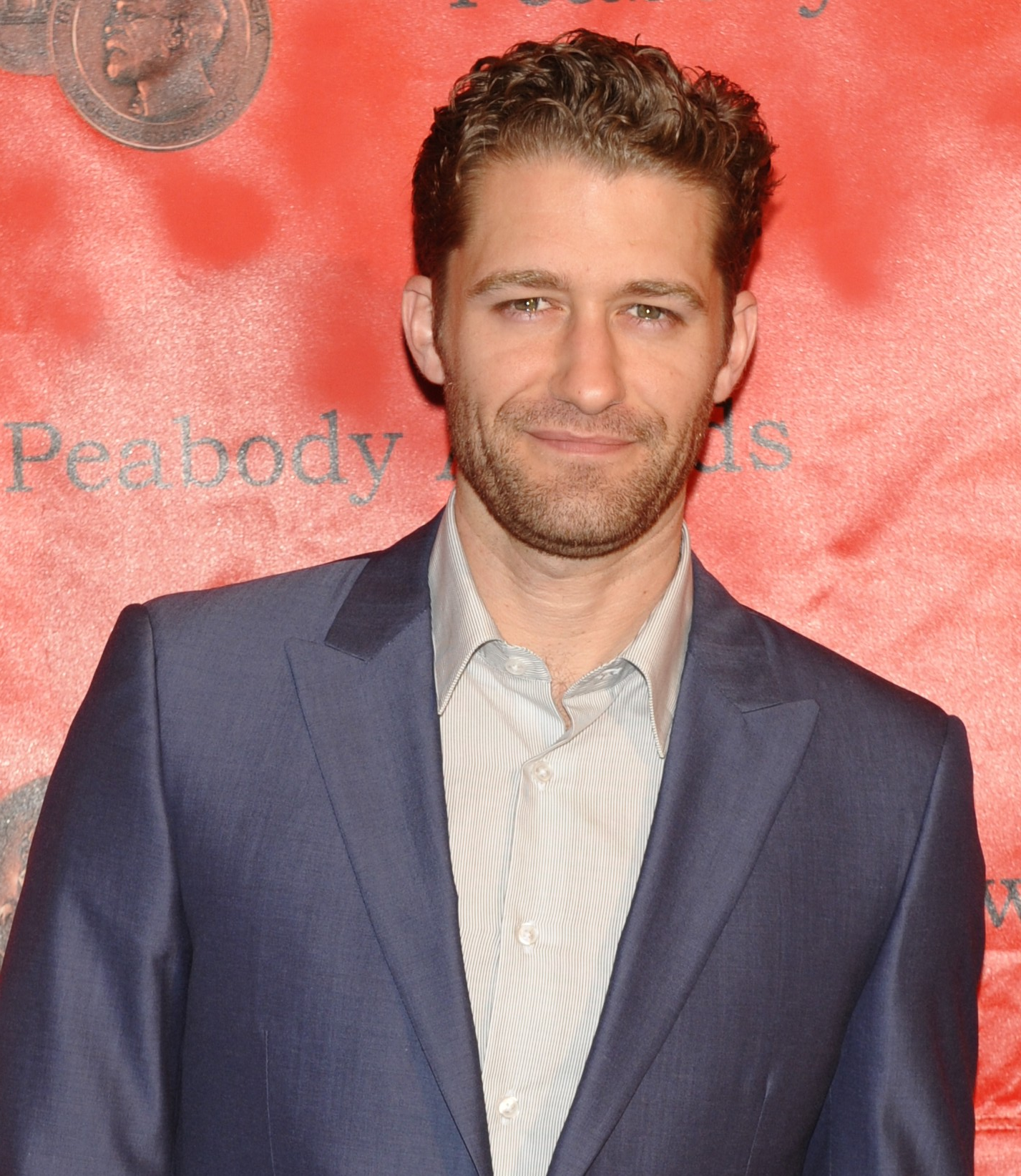
One reviewer called the moment when Will (Matthew Morrison, pictured) kissed Coach Beiste "somehow both heartfelt and completely horrifying".

In Beiste's first episode, "Audition", The Wall Street Journal's Raymund Flandez wrote that the coach was "the most interesting character so far", and one "whose comedic range is as maniacal as Coach Sue", and Amy Reiter of the Los Angeles Times said Beiste was "played with a perfect blend of brutishness and grace" by Jones. In Beiste's fourth appearance, for the episode entitled "Never Been Kissed", the character's storyline was met with criticism, though the acting of Jones was not. Reiter questioned why Beiste was made to look to high school students to "gauge her own desirability", an element she found "hazy and creepy". James Poniewozik of Time criticized the depiction of Beiste as an object of pity, and felt that Will's behavior was worse than the students' when he acted with "amazing condescension" and kissed the coach. Both Poniewozik and MTV's Aly Semigran disliked the way viewers were made complicit in Beiste's humiliation by being invited to laugh at the character's expense, and Linda Holmes of NPR criticized Glee for denying Beiste dignity, with the observation that such a plot would never have been given to Kurt. Emily VanDerWerff of The A.V. Club commented negatively on the way Glee plays up Beiste's "masculine nature" while simultaneously lecturing viewers against mocking Beiste. She called the kiss "somehow both heartfelt and completely horrifying". IGN's Robert Canning praised Jones in her "best performance this season", as well as Beiste's "raw and real" confession to Will.

Joel Keller of AOLTV complimented Jones in "A Very Glee Christmas" for "shining in this storyline" as Coach Beiste: "Her scene as Santa, and then her knowing expression as she watched Artie walk, were the best moments of the episode." The Atlantic's Patrick Burns agreed: Jones's "performance as the Santa Claus bearer of harsh reality was quite moving. It's nice to see her get to show her acting chops and refreshing to see her character's vulnerability." Poniewozik also agreed, and said Jones "has been remarkable", "taking every ridiculous moment Glee has thrown at her and finding the true emotion at the core of the absurdity, which is what Glee at its best does." A similar sentiment was expressed by VanDerWerff in his review of the following episode, "The Sue Sylvester Shuffle": "I also like Coach Beiste because she’s one of the few characters who seems to grasp how insane some of this is. I always like when a show that frequently goes over the top introduces someone who’s able to undercut some of that ridiculousness."

Reviewers have been similarly pleased with third-season performances. In the fifth episode, "The First Time", Poniewozik credited Jones as Beiste with "stunning work", and John Kubicek of BuddyTV said Beiste's "fragile lack of self-esteem" was "believable and heartfelt" and that Jones was "brilliant". His first solo song was in the seventh episode, "I Kissed a Girl": Dolly Parton's "Jolene". It was called "haunting" by Vanity Fair's Brett Berk, who gave it four stars out of five, and Michael Slezak of TVLine graded it an "A−" and said it was a "killer use of Dolly Parton" even if "Beiste isn’t the strongest vocalist". Both Kubicek and Rolling Stone's Erica Futterman noted a lack of emotion in Beiste's voice, but they also noted the emotion in the character's face, which Kubicek said "more than made up for it".

== Accolades ==
Jones received an Emmy nomination for Outstanding Guest Actress in a Comedy Series for her work as Beiste in Glee's second season, and submitted her performance in the episode "Never Been Kissed" for final judging. She was one of three actresses from the show to be nominated in that category in 2011; the victor was another Glee nominee, Gwyneth Paltrow. She was also part of the Glee cast ensemble that was nominated in December 2011 for the Outstanding Performance by an Ensemble in a Comedy Series award at the 18th Screen Actors Guild Awards. In 2012, Jones was nominated for an Emmy again, the only actor from Glee nominated that year. Jones was nominated again for the 2013 season, one of two Glee actors to be nominated.
