= Kitty Wilde =

Fictional character from the Fox series Glee

- Glee character
- Becca Tobin as Kitty Wilde in Glee
- First appearance: "The New Rachel" (2012)
- Last appearance: "Dreams Come True" (2015)
- Created by: Ryan Murphy; Brad Falchuk; Ian Brennan
- Portrayed by: Becca Tobin

In-universe information
- Occupation: High school student (graduated)
- Significant others: Artie Abrams; Noah Puckerman; Jake Puckerman
- Religion: Christian

Kitty Wilde is a fictional character from the Fox musical comedy-drama series Glee. The character is portrayed by actress Becca Tobin, and appeared for the first time during the first episode of the fourth season, "The New Rachel", first broadcast on September 13, 2012. Kitty was introduced as a bully and a member of the McKinley High cheerleader squad who slushies the newest members of the Glee club, Marley Rose and Wade "Unique" Adams, and serves as the new teen antagonist for the season, as well as serving as a parallel to an early Quinn Fabray. As the season progressed, she joins the glee club and becomes Marley's worst enemy. However, later it is shown that Kitty also has a soft side. Her harshness and cruelty seems to be greatly lessened during the fifth and sixth season, as she is seen becoming a better person, though she still acts rudely in general most of the time.

Kitty was a recurring character in the fourth season, but was promoted to the main cast during the fifth season before being demoted to the recurring cast again in the sixth and final season – the only cast member introduced in the fourth season to have a significant presence (nine out of thirteen episodes) in the final season.

== Storylines ==
=== Season 4 ===
At the beginning the fourth season, Kitty is initially friendly to members of the school's glee club, New Directions, because they were popular. Once the glee club recruits Marley Rose (Melissa Benoist) and Wade "Unique" Adams (Alex Newell), however, Kitty is less welcoming to the newcomers. Marley tells the glee club she is not comfortable with Kitty, and the cheerleader says that the feeling is mutual. She starts a relationship with Marley's love interest and brother of former glee club member Puck, Jake Puckerman (Jacob Artist). The two of them break up during the fourth episode of the season, "The Break-Up", because he becomes angry at her for insulting his friend, Marley, which in turn angers Kitty.

Kitty later competes with Marley for the female lead role in the school musical, Grease. Marley wins the role, leaving Kitty angry and with the part of Patty Simcox. During the production of the school musical, Kitty manipulates Marley's costumes, and makes them tighter because she wants Marley to believe that she is gaining weight, which contributes to Marley having an eating disorder. During the season's eighth episode, "Thanksgiving", Kitty meets her idol, who is a former Cheerio and glee club member, Quinn Fabray (Dianna Agron), and tell her lies about Jake pressuring Marley into sex which Quinn believes due to her experience with his brother Puck (Mark Salling) back in the first season. Santana Lopez (Naya Rivera) is the only alumna who is aware of Kitty's manipulative nature. After failing to get Jake back, Kitty dates Puck instead. Kitty initially pretends to be Marley's friend, but as the season progress, she ends up liking her. Later in the year, two gun shots are heard and the school goes into lockdown. Fearing that she and everyone else in the glee club won't get out alive, Kitty admits to Marley that she altered her costumes and apologizes to her and Unique. When Kitty and Puck break-up, she develops a crush on her friend Ryder Lynn (Blake Jenner), after he and Kitty connect over their shared experiences of sexual abuse. They go on one date and when Kitty wants to go on another he blows her off, which leads to awkwardness between them. She was sadly denied.

Near the season finale, Kitty helps Artie Abrams (Kevin McHale) to attend to the college of his dreams and also becomes a friend of everyone of the glee club.

=== Season 5 ===
Kitty starts a relationship with Artie, but they initially keep it a secret because she is afraid that it will ruin her popularity. When Tina Cohen-Chang (Jenna Ushkowitz) finds out, she tells the glee club members about it. Kitty then makes the relationship official and public. During the second episode of the season, "Tina in the Sky with Diamonds", Tina and Kitty are both nominated for prom queen. Kitty, a sophomore, strongly supports Tina because she is a senior and feels it is her time to shine, but a new cheerleader, Bree (Erinn Westbrook), insists that Kitty wins the crown because she believes that a Cheerio should win. Bree posts campaign posters of Kitty, though everyone thinks that Kitty did so. When Tina wins at the prom, only to be struck with a bucketful of slushie moments afterward, thanks to Bree's connivance, Kitty lets Tina use her prom dress for the remainder of the evening.

Kitty's final appearance of the season is at the end of school year in the episode "New Directions", after school principal Sue Sylvester (Jane Lynch) disbands the glee club for failing to win the national championship. The remaining seven episodes of the season all took place in New York City only, during which it is mentioned that Artie and Kitty have broken up.

=== Season 6 ===
In the episode "Homecoming", while the New Directions alumni are trying to recruit new students to join the revamped glee club led by Rachel Berry (Lea Michele) and Kurt Hummel (Chris Colfer), Kitty—bitter over her and Artie's breakup and Rachel failing to know the names of the glee club members who had joined after her graduation despite having met them—slams Quinn, Santana, Brittany, and especially Artie, for how the past members treated the members who joined when she did, and discourages the new Cheerios from joining. Later, in the episode "The Hurt Locker, Part Two", Rachel tries to recruit Kitty to rejoin the glee club. Kitty reveals that the reason she is so against rejoining the club is because of how she was so invested in the club before but was heartbroken when her friends stopped talking to her once they got transferred away from McKinley High after the club was disbanded. After Rachel convinces her she will make sure the club is back permanently, Kitty has a change of heart and rejoins. She now has a nicer attitude towards Rachel and seems to mingle with the new newbies, and as the one with the most experience in the club, becomes something of a leader to them. She also attends the double wedding of Brittany & Santana and Kurt & Blaine, and befriends the new tween member of the Glee Club, Myron, who is interested in her. In the series finale "Dreams Come True", after winning Nationals with the glee club, she graduates (offscreen) and later moves to New York, where she watches Rachel winning a Tony award on TV with her friends. She appears in the final performance of the episode.

== Musical performances ==
Samantha Highfill of Entertainment Weekly gave a "B+" grade to Kitty's performance with Marley Rose, Wade "Unique" Adams, Brittany S. Pierce, and Tina Cohen-Chang of the Spice Girls' "Wannabe" in the episode Guilty Pleasures", and wrote, "The vocals were good, the vibe was fun, but I wasn't too impressed with the costumes, probably because I've done better. Yes, I won a costume contest as one-fifth of the Spice Girls in college. So what?".

Erin Strecker of Entertainment Weekly gave a "B+" grade to Kitty's duet with Marley Rose of Bonnie Tyler's "Holding Out for a Hero" in the "Dynamic Duets" episode, and wrote, "I've said it before: I may not like her character, but I really enjoy Kitty's performances. This high-energy choir room duet with Marley was a superhero treat".

Sandra Gonzalez of Entertainment Weekly gave a "B" grade to Kitty's rendition of Stevie Wonder's "Signed, Sealed, Delivered I'm Yours" in the "Wonder-ful" episode, and wrote, "Kitty, Jake and Ryder have their choir room fun in this Wonder classic, but I have to agree with Mercedes – they never really took it to the next level." Michael Slezak gave the number a "C+". L'Oreal Thompson of The Baltimore Sun called it a "rather spirited rendition".

== Reception ==
Reviews for Kitty's role has received mixed opinions from critics.

Kitty's role in earlier episodes — specifically in the episode "Glease" — has been received negatively by Lesley Goldberg of The Hollywood Reporter, as she pointed out her bullying nature. She says "While Kitty's zingers can be funny, her attempt to win Jake back over by meddling with Marley makes little sense considering the limited time (and chemistry) the Cheerio had with the younger Puckerman." When Kitty was first introduced, she received extremely negative reviews from fans because Sue Sylvester (Jane Lynch) described her as a "new Quinn Fabray" on Kitty's first appearance, "The New Rachel". Tobin said they are very different because: "Quinn was more mysterious about her motives, and Kitty has no filter and whatever she thinks, she says out loud, and she doesn't make it too secretive what her motives are." But she also admitted that they have their similarities, "Kitty really looks up to Quinn because she's the original mean girl and original head Cheerio queen-bee type", she explained.

Erin Strecker of Entertainment Weekly gave Kitty's role in the fourth season a mixed review, saying:

"Kitty was clearly brought in to be the new sassy, popular cheerleader when she joined the show at the beginning of this season, but right now, the role is too cartoonish-ly overblown. As viewers, there has to be something that we can either relate to or (barring that) at least understand about a character’s motivation. For most of season 4, Kitty didn’t have that background; she was just a pile of racist, hateful remarks with a side of teen girl jealousy."
