= Becca Tobin =

American actress (born 1986)

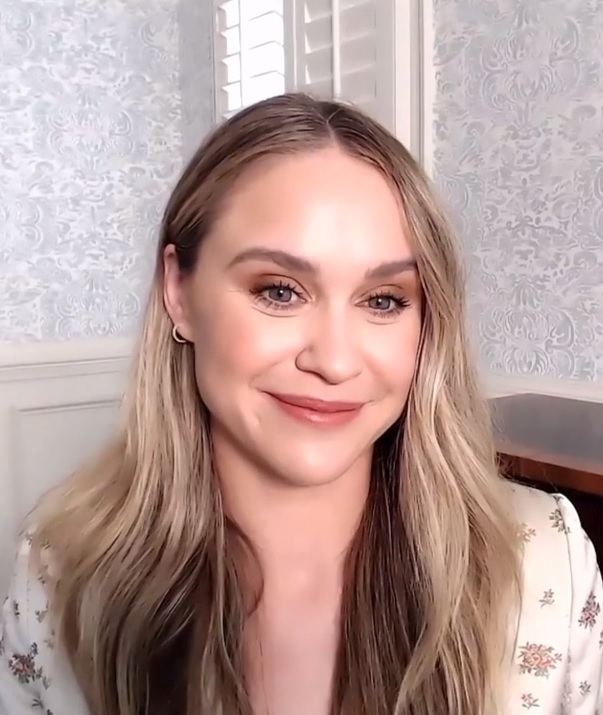
- Tobin in 2021
- Born: Rebecca Grace Tobin; January 18, 1986 (age 40); Atlanta, Georgia, U.S.
- Education: American Musical and Dramatic Academy
- Occupations: Actress; singer; dancer
- Years active: 1990–present
- Spouse: Zach Martin (m. 2016)
- Children: 2

Rebecca Grace Tobin (born January 18, 1986) is an American actress, singer, and dancer. She is known for her role as Kitty Wilde on the Fox musical comedy-drama series Glee.

== Early life ==
Tobin grew up in Marietta, Georgia, the younger of two daughters. Both of her parents were attorneys. Her father is Jewish. Tobin's first acting performance was at age four, when she played a Christmas tree in her school's holiday pageant. For high school, Tobin was predominantly educated at Pebblebrook High School, but she transferred to Joseph Wheeler High School halfway through her senior year and was a victim of bullying as a result. She is an alumna of the American Musical and Dramatic Academy in New York City, from which she graduated in 2007.

== Career ==
Tobin began her professional career on the stage in Houston, Texas, in a Theatre Under the Stars production of the musical Cats. She performed as Etcetera in the ensemble cast. The following year, she starred in the ensemble of the Theater Under the Stars' production of West Side Story, also in Houston. In 2008, Tobin performed in the ensemble of Paper Mill Playhouse's production of High School Musical on Stage! in New Jersey. From 2008 to 2009, she performed in the ensemble of Oklahoma! in Atlanta with the Theater of the Stars company. Tobin made her Broadway debut as a replacement for the role of Sherrie Christian and a swing for the musical Rock of Ages. In 2011, she toured with the Trans-Siberian Orchestra.

From 2012 until its ending in 2015, Tobin portrayed cheerleader and glee club member Kitty Wilde in the Fox musical comedy-drama television series Glee. She made her first appearance as the character in the fourth season premiere episode "The New Rachel", and was a regular recurring cast member for throughout that season. She was upgraded to a main cast member for the series' fifth season. Kitty's debut received a mixed reception from critics, but opinions on the character soon changed. Several songs performed by Tobin as Kitty on the series have been released as singles available for digital download, and have also featured on the soundtrack albums.

In 2014, Tobin guest starred in Lifetime's legal comedy-drama series Drop Dead Diva as Empress Katia in the episode "Afterlife". That same year, she appeared as Kimmee Kittson in the episode "Passing the Torch" of ABC Family's sitcom Mystery Girls. In 2015, Tobin guest starred as Blaze Talcott, a computer coder, in an episode of CBS' procedural action-drama series NCIS: Los Angeles titled "Blaze of Glory". Since December 2015, Tobin has co-hosted the female-centric podcast series "The Lady Gang" with Keltie Knight and Jac Vanek. In October 2018, Ladygang premiered as a talk show on the E! network.

== Personal life ==
Tobin was in a relationship with nightclub entrepreneur Matt Bendik until his death on July 10, 2014. She became engaged to entrepreneur Zach Martin in May 2016. They married in a private ceremony, officiated by Tobin's Glee co-star Jane Lynch, in Jackson Hole, Wyoming on December 3, 2016.

In May 2013, she appeared in an issue of Maxim.

On February 22, 2022, Tobin announced on Instagram that she and her husband welcomed a son via surrogacy. Tobin and Martin were open about their fertility struggles and IVF journey prior to the arrival of their son.

== Filmography ==
Year	Title	Role	Notes
2009	Wiener & Wiener	Heather	Episode: "Beyonce's Walk-In Closet"
2012–2015	Glee	Kitty Wilde	Recurring role (seasons 4 & 6); main role (season 5)
2014	Drop Dead Diva	Empress Katia	Episode: "Afterlife"
2014	Mystery Girls	Kimmee Kittson	Episode: "Passing the Torch"
2015	NCIS: Los Angeles	Blaze Talcott	Episode: "Blaze of Glory"
2017	Dropping the Soap	Tammy O'Rourke	Episode: "Julian's Choice"
2017	Do I Say I Do?	Jessica Bender	Television film
2017	A Song for Christmas	Adelaide Kay	Television film (Hallmark Channel)
2018	Love at First Dance	Hope	Television film (Hallmark Channel)
2018–present	LadyGang	Herself	Host
2019	Sister of the Bride	Stephanie	Television film (Hallmark Channel)
2021	Zoey's Extraordinary Playlist	Therapy Patient	Episode: "Zoey's Extraordinary Double Date"
2021	Turner & Hooch	Brooke Mailer	Recurring role
2021	Christmas Is You	Emma Bloom	Television film (GAC Family)
2022	The Dinner Party	Sarah	
2023	The Wedding Contract	Rebecca	Television film (Hallmark Channel)
2025	The Weakest Link	Herself	

== Stage ==
Year	Title	Role	Location
2005	Cats	Etcetera	Hobby Center for the Performing Arts, Houston
2006	Chicago	Roxie Hart	Fort Salem Theater, Salem New York
2006–2007	West Side Story	Velma the Jet	Hobby Center for the Performing Arts, Houston
2008	High School Musical on Stage!	Ensemble	Paper Mill Playhouse, New Jersey
2008–2009	Oklahoma!	Ensemble	Fox Theatre, Atlanta
2009–2011	Rock of Ages	Sherrie Christian	Brooks Atkinson Theatre, Broadway

== Awards and nominations ==
Year	Award	Category	Work	Result
2013	Teen Choice Awards	Choice TV Villain	Glee	Nominated
