= Hollywood Life =

American digital media brand

- Website type: Popular culture, news
- Available in: English
- Owner: Bonnie Fuller
- Editors: Bonnie Fuller (Editor-in-chief); Dina Sartore-Bodo (Managing editor)
- Website: hollywoodlife.com
- Commercial: Yes
- Launched: 2009; 17 years ago
- Current status: Active

Hollywood Life is an American digital media brand launched in 2009 by magazine editor Bonnie Fuller. The site covers celebrity, fashion, beauty, women issues, and entertainment news. It also airs award shows and other pop culture events.

== History ==
Hollywood Life was launched in 2009 as part of Penske Media Corporation by magazine editor Bonnie Fuller, who is the former editor of the magazines Cosmopolitan, Glamour, and Us Weekly. It began as a placeholder website and YouTube channel to cover news related to Hollywood.

The website began airing a weekly podcast in January 2015, hosted by editor-in-chief Bonnie Fuller, which includes discussion, debate, celebrity interviews and exclusives on celebrity news. In June 2015, Hollywood Life and New York City television station WPIX (then owned by Tribune Broadcasting) announced a content and cross-promotional partnership across all platforms. As part of the collaboration, Hollywood Life now provides WPIX with entertainment content on-air during the station's newscasts and on its website, PIX11.com.

By 2016, the site received between 20 and 35 million unique monthly visitors, publishing 650 posts per week with 70 percent of its audience coming from mobile. The site launched an annual Beauty Awards in 2018 and Fitness & Wellness Awards in 2019. It also has a GenNext Award given to women who have made accomplishments in their respective careers. Eli Lippman was appointed the President of Hollywood Life.

In 2021, Fuller purchased full ownership of the brand back from Penske Media.

== Hollywood Style Awards ==
Since 2003, Hollywood Life has hosted the Hollywood Style Awards, to recognize "style contributions to the Hollywood aesthetic scene."

The 2009 Hollywood Style Awards honored winners such as Selena Gomez, Kim Kardashian, Nina Dobrev, and Paul Wesley. Selena Gomez won the "Style Ingenue" award, Kim Kardashian won the "Style Siren" award, and Nina Dobrev and Paul Wesley won the peoples choice award for "Hottest New Couple This Fall".
