= Marshall Williams =

Canadian actor and model

- Born: July 31, 1989 (age 37); Winnipeg, Manitoba, Canada
- Occupations: Actor, model
- Years active: 2005–present
- Height: 183 cm (6 ft 0 in)

Marshall Williams (born July 31, 1989) is a Canadian actor and model. He is best known for his role as Spencer Porter on Glee, and Albert Banks in How to Build a Better Boy.

== Life and career ==
Marshall Williams was born in Winnipeg, Manitoba. Williams was a contestant on Canadian Idol in 2007 and 2008. As a model, he has worked with Abercrombie & Fitch, Hollister, Diesel, Mattel, and M.A.C. Cosmetics, in addition to walking the runway in both Toronto Fashion Week and Los Angeles Fashion Week. In his latest TV movie, Williams stars in the Disney Channel Original Movie, How to Build a Better Boy, as Albert Banks. Williams also starred in the sixth and final season of Glee, in which he played Spencer Porter, a member of the McKinley High School football team who joins the glee club.

== Filmography ==
Year	Title	Role	Notes
2005	Bobby Speaking	Boot Maker	Direct-to-video film
2010	High Society	Marshall Williams	Episode: "Page Sixed"; uncredited
2010	Being Erica	Frat Brother (Frat)	Episode: "Two Wrongs"
2011	Alphas	High School Guy	Episode: "Never Let Me Go"
2011	Desperately Seeking Santa	Male Model	Television film
2012	Really Me	Cowboy Student	Episode: "Cooper Collegiate"
2012	Todd and the Book of Pure Evil	Boyce	Episode: "B.Y.O.B.O.P.E."
2012	My Babysitter's a Vampire	Tad	Episode: "Flushed"
2013	Saving Hope	Justin	Episode: "I Watch Death"
2013	Pete's Christmas	Mike Bronski	Television film
2014	How to Build a Better Boy	Albert Banks	Television film (Disney Channel Original Movie)
2014	Headcase	Agent Donegan	Film
2015	Glee	Spencer Porter	Recurring role (season 6), 11 episodes
2019; 2021	When Hope Calls	Sam Tremblay	Recurring role (season 1, 6 episodes); Main role (season 2, 2 episodes)
2019	Stand!	Stefan Sokolowski	Film
2020	Amazing Winter Romance	Nate	Television film (Hallmark)
2020	Follow Me to Daisy Hills	Blake	Television Film (Hallmark)
2020	Sincerely, Yours, Truly	Josh Burns	Television Film
2020	Pamela & Ivy	Mugger	Film (Short)
2021	Scented With Love	Ryan	Film
2022	Exile	Cole	
2023	The Jingle Bell Jubilee	Nate	Television film
2023	A Town Called Love	Riley	Television film
2024	A Sprinkle of Christmas	Peter Holloway	Television movie
2025	Pitfall	Scott	
