= Laura Dreyfuss =

American actress, singer (b. 1988)

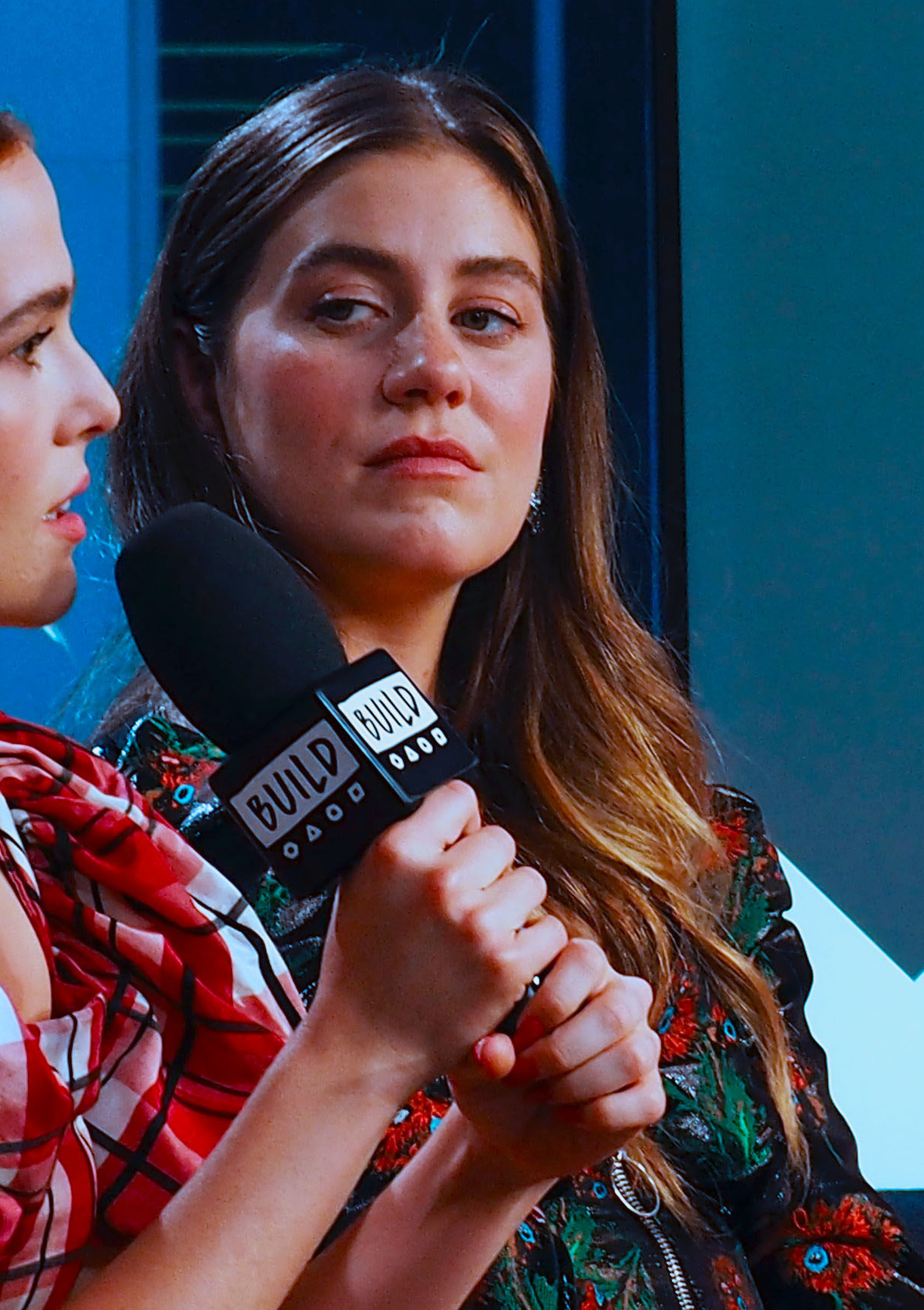
- Dreyfuss in September 2019
- Born: Laura Catherine Dreyfuss; August 22, 1988 (age 38); New Jersey, U.S.
- Education: Boston Conservatory (BFA)
- Occupations: Actress; singer
- Years active: 2010–present

Laura Catherine Dreyfuss (born August 22, 1988) is an American actress and singer, known for her roles as Zoe Murphy in the Broadway musical Dear Evan Hansen, Madison McCarthy on the FOX musical series Glee and McAfee Westbrook on the Netflix series The Politician.

== Life and career ==
Dreyfuss earned a BFA in musical theatre from the Boston Conservatory. Dreyfuss was cast in the ensemble of the Broadway revival of Hair, then served as stand-by and later was a replacement for the main character of Girl in the musical Once.

Dreyfuss originated the role of Zoe Murphy, the love interest of the title character, Evan Hansen, in the Broadway musical Dear Evan Hansen after previously playing the role in both the Arena Stage and Second Stage Theatre productions. On July 12, 2018 it was announced that Dreyfuss would leave Dear Evan Hansen, with her last show being July 15, 2018. On July 16, 2018 Dreyfuss was announced as a series regular on Ryan Murphy's Netflix series The Politician, with her Dear Evan Hansen co-Star, Ben Platt. On July 26, 2018, Dreyfuss released her debut single "Be Great" under the stage name Loladre.

== Acting credits ==
Theatre
Year	Title	Role	Venue	Notes
2010	Hair	Swing u/s Sheila & Crissy	—N/a	National tour
2011	Hair	Swing u/s Sheila & Crissy	St. James Theatre	Broadway
2011-2012	Hair	Tribe		National tour
2012–2013	Once	Girl (standby)	Bernard B. Jacobs Theatre	Broadway
2013	Once	Girl	Bernard B. Jacobs Theatre	Broadway
2013–2014	What's It All About? Bacharach Reimagined	Performer	New York Theatre Workshop	Off-Broadway
2015	Dear Evan Hansen	Zoe Murphy	Arena Stage	Original Washington, DC. production
2016	Dear Evan Hansen	Zoe Murphy	Second Stage	Off-Broadway
2016–2018	Dear Evan Hansen	Zoe Murphy	Music Box Theatre	Broadway

Film
Year	Title	Role	Notes
2017	After Party	Lana	Lead role
2021	Voyagers	IVF Technician	

Television
Year	Title	Role	Notes
2015	Glee	Madison McCarthy	Season 6; 11 episodes
2018	The Marvelous Mrs. Maisel	Deecy	Season 2; 2 episodes
2019–2020	The Politician	McAfee Westbrook	Main cast
2022	Atlanta	Amber	Episode: "Three Slaps"
2026	The Beauty	Jennifer King	Episode: "Beautiful Patient Zero"

== Awards and nominations ==
Year	Award	Work	Category	Result	Ref.
2016	Helen Hayes Award	Dear Evan Hansen	Outstanding Actress in a Supporting Role, Resident Musical	Nominated	
2017	Broadway.com Audience Award	Dear Evan Hansen	Favorite Actress in a Featured Role in a Musical	Won	
2017	Broadway.com Audience Award	Dear Evan Hansen	Favorite Onstage Pair	Won	
2017	Broadway.com Audience Award	Dear Evan Hansen	Favorite Breakthrough Performance (Female)	Won	
2018	Grammy Awards	Dear Evan Hansen	Best Musical Theater Album	Won	
2018	Daytime Creative Arts Emmy Awards	"You Will Be Found" (performed on The Today Show)	Outstanding Musical Performance in a Daytime Program (Ben Platt & the Cast of Dear Evan Hansen)	Won	
