= Kalita =

Kalita may refer to:

== People ==
=== Surname ===
- Gauri Shankar Kalita (1955–2010), Indian journalist
- Dwipamani Kalita, Assamese separatist
- Gautam Kalita, Indian bodybuilder
- Ivan I Danilovich Kalita; 1288–1341), grand duke of Moscow and Vladimir
- Ivan Aleksandrovich Kalita (1927–1996), Soviet equestrian
- Mirosław Kalita (born 1970), Polish footballer and coach
- Satyabrat Kalita, Indian politician
- Suhani Kalita (born 1991), Indian film actress and model

=== Given name ===
- Kalita Humphreys (1914–1954), American actress
- Kalita E. Leighton (1871–1928), American attorney and judge, and college football player and coach

=== Middle name ===
- Arupa Kalita Patangia, Indian writer

== Other uses ==
- Kalita (caste), a caste from the state of Assam, India
- Kalita, Estonia, a village in Saarde Parish, Pärnu County, Estonia
- Kalita Humphreys Theater, a historic theater in Dallas, Texas, U.S.
- Kalita Nature Reserve, located in Pärnu County, Estonia

== See also ==
- Kalitta (disambiguation)
- Kalyta, a town in Kyiv Oblast, Ukraine
