= Wade McCollum =

American actor (born 1978)

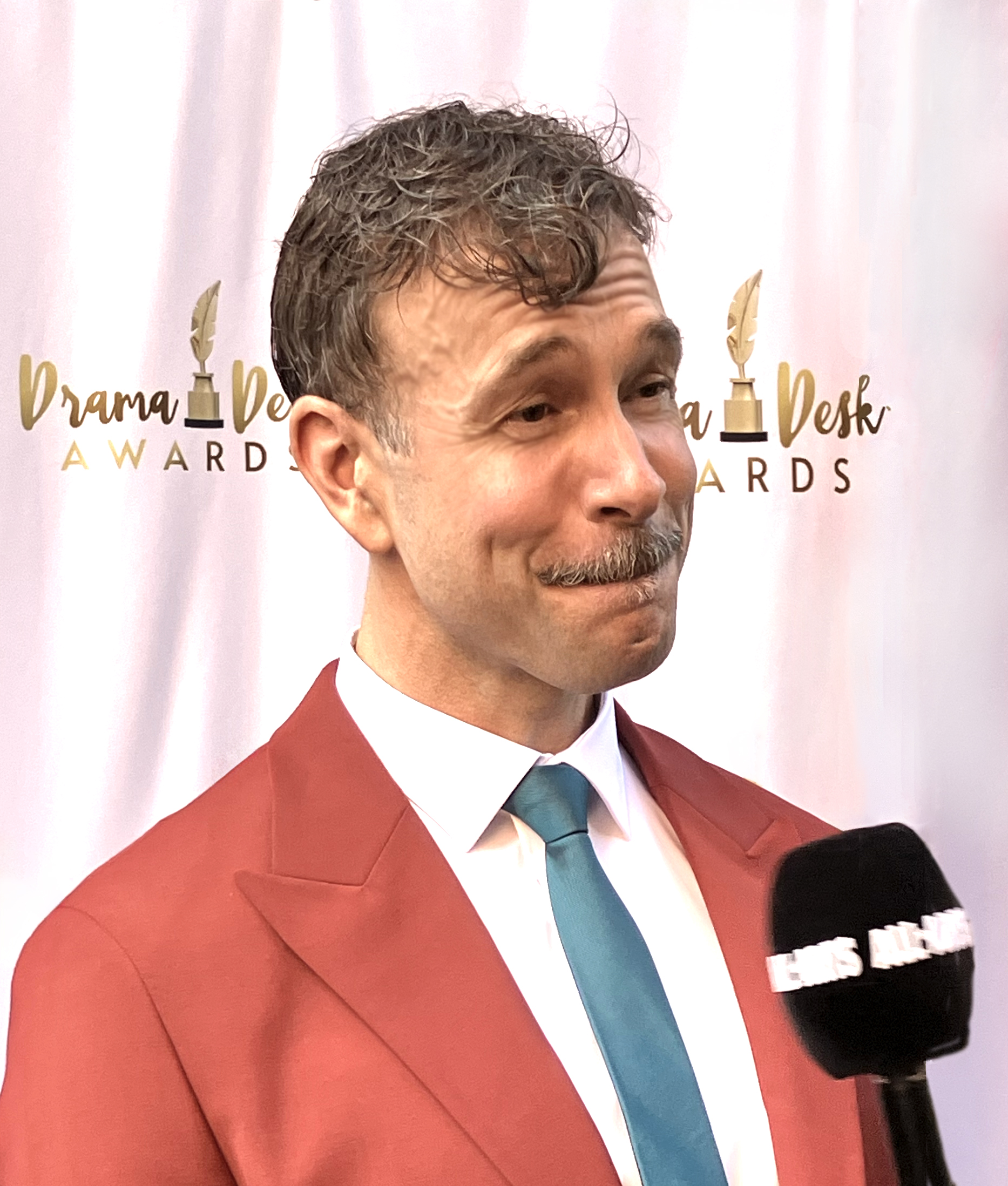
- Born: 1978 (age 47–48)
- Occupations: film actor, stage actor, composer/musician
- Years active: 1999-present
- Awards: Best Solo Performance 2024: Off-Broadway Alliance Award (Make Me Gorgeous), Best Actor: Dallas/Fort Worth Critics Circle Award (Emcee in Cabaret), Los Angeles Drama Critics Circle Award (Hedwig in Hedwig and the Angry Inch) Backstage Garland Award (Hedwig in Hedwig and the Angry Inch), Drammy Award (Batboy in Batboy the Musical)
- Website: www.wadesong.com

Wade McCollum (born 1978) is an American film actor, stage actor and composer/musician.

== Early life ==
McCollum was born in 1978 in Chico, California. His father is a rock-n-roll drummer and McCollum spent his early life on the road traveling from town to town. He spent some school years in Ashland, Oregon, home of the Oregon Shakespeare Festival. He left high school at age 16 to attend the Pacific Conservatory of the Performing Arts.

== Career ==
After graduating from the Pacific Conservatory of the Performing Arts, McCollum went on to land the role of Hedwig in a 2002 Triangle Theatre production of John Cameron Mitchell and Stephen Trask’s rock musical Hedwig and the Angry Inch. McCollum went on to star in several productions of Hedwig and the Angry Inch, including the Ovation Award-winning 2004 Celebration Theatre production in Hollywood, CA. For this production McCollum won the Backstage West Garland Award, The Los Angeles Drama Critic’s Circle Award and was praised by publications such as Variety and the Los Angeles Times.

McCollum released a music album called Beauty is a Streetlight in 2006.

While in Portland, McCollum appeared as Frank-n-Furter in The Rocky Horror Picture Show, the Emcee in Cabaret opposite Storm Large as Sally Bowles, and Prior in Angels in America. At Portland Center Stage, he starred as Batboy in Bat Boy: The Musical and the one-person shows I Am My Own Wife^{[23]} and The Santaland Diaries.^{[29] [51]} McCollum also co-founded and functioned as artistic director of Insight Out Theatre Collective where his hit original musical ONE (a.k.a. The Other Shore) was produced.^{[52]} ONE was still in development for commercial production, as of 2022.

McCollum went on to appear in Jersey Boys, led Broadway’s Priscilla Queen of the Desert First National Tour, and upon his return to New York City, made his Broadway debut in Wicked. McCollum has appeared in numerous Off-Broadway shows including Triassic Parq and most notably his Lucille Lortel Award nominated turn as Ernest Shackleton in Ernest Shackleton Loves Me, for which he garnered the prestigious Norton Award for “Best Actor” with the show winning the Off-Broadway Alliance Award for Best Musical in 2017 Ernest Shackleton Loves Me was streamed live during its run in NYC and available on Broadway HD.

In 2011 McCollum appeared as the Emcee in Dallas Theatre Center’s Cabaret opposite Kate Wetherhead as Sally Bowles. Wetherhead is the creator of the Web Comedy Submissions Only in which McCollum played Nolan Grigsby.

In 2018, McCollum originated the role of Carl von Cosel in the new musical It Happened In Key West on London’s West End.

McCollum’s first performance back in the theatre after the Covid-19 shutdown was as a last-minute emergency cover for Henry Higgins in Lincoln Center Theatre’s national tour of My Fair Lady directed by Bartlett Sher.

In 2022 McCollum completed Secondary Dominance, his first feature film as co-director and co-writer with longtime collaborator Sarah Small.

In 2023 McCollum originated the role of Wade in Water for Elephants at the Alliance theatre in Atlanta. Upon returning from Atlanta, Wade starred in and co created (additional material) the hit solo show Make Me Gorgeous Off Broadway at Playhouse 46. Make Me Gorgeous was extended for three months and nominated for the Lortel Award (Best Solo Show) and Wade’s performance was nominated for the Drama Desk Award (Best Solo Performance) and he won Best Solo Performance (Off-Broadway Alliance Award).

In 2024 Darius Rose (a.k.a. Jackie Cox) replaced McCollum in Make Me Gorgeous[44] as Wade left to originate his first principal role on Broadway in Water for Elephants. Water for Elephants, directed by Jessica Stone, with book by Rick Elice, composed by PigPen Theatre company, and choreographed by Jesse Robb and Shana Carroll of Seven Fingers Circus was nominated for 7 Tony Awards including Best Musical in 2024. Wade performed “The Road Don’t Make You Young” from Water For Elephants on the 2024 live Tony Award show for CBS.

In 2025 Wade went on to originate the role of Bee Doyle in Floyd Collins by Tina Landau and Adam Guettel at the Lincoln Center Theatre. This show was Andre Bishop's final production and LCT's 40th anniversary season. The production starred Jeremy Jordan as Floyd (Wade covered the role) and Lizzy McAlpine as Nelly. McCollum finished out the year playing Huey in an Off-Broadway revival of John Patrick Shanley's Italian American Reconciliationplaying opposite Mary Testa and Robert Farrior.

In 2026 McCollum wrote, directed, composed, choreographed and starred in ZAF: The Chemistry of Control at the Royal Institution in London. produced and conceived by cultural entomologist Bridget Nicholls the show blends Wade's neuroscience and theatre disciplines into a biology based musical lecture. McCollum then returned to star as Kenny "Killer" Kane in the World Premier of the new musical Freak the Mighty at Cleveland Playhouse and Seattle Rep. Freak the Mighty has Book & Lyrics by Anthony Drewe, music by Ryan Fielding Garrett, directed by Michael Barakiva, is based on the novel by Rodman Philbrick, and is produced by Tony Award winning (Come From Away) Junkyard Dog Productions.

== Personal life ==
McCollum is married to artist Noah Jordan. McCollum’s father-in-law is 2012 Nobel Prize in Chemistry winner Robert Lefkowitz.

== Filmography ==
=== Film ===
Year	Title	Role	Notes
2000	Delicate Instruments	Gary	
2009	Only Time Will Tell	Zach	Short
2017	Grandpa’s Kaleidescope	The Stranger	Music Video
2017	Ernest Shackleton Loves Me	Ernest Shackleton and others	
2018	Options	Stephen Cartwright	Short
2019	In the Night Room	The Stranger	Music Video
2020	Blowing Dandelions	The Stranger	Music Video
2022	Secondary Dominance	The Scientist turn Muse / Dancer	Also co-writer and director
TBD	Riding Out the Storm	Bob	Short

=== Television ===
Year	Title	Role	Notes
2011-2014	Submissions Only	Nolan Grigsby	Web Series
2015	The Knick	Sydney Carton	HBO max
2017	Nightcap	Louis Mackie	Pop TV
2019	At Home with Amy Sedaris	The Skeleton	Pop TV
2019	Prodigal Son	Angry Man	FOX
2019	Madame Secretary	Andy	CBS
2022	FBI Most Wanted	Leon McCann	CBS
2024	Tony Awards	Lead performer	
2025	Tony Awards	Performer	

=== Theater ===
Year	Title	Role	Notes
1999	RSC’s The Shakespeare Revue	Hamlet et al.	US premier
2002	ONE	Sid	an earlier version of the musical he wrote and co-composed with Eric Nordin.
2003-2005	Hedwig and the Angry Inch	Hedwig	Regional, with triangle! Theatre and Celebration Theatre
2003	The Last Five Years	Jamie	West Coast Premier
2003-2004	The Merchant of Venice	Lancelot Gobbo	with Portland Center Stage
2003-2004	Bat Boy: The Musical	Bat Boy	with Portland Center Stage
2004	On the Verge	Mary	
2005	The Rocky Horror Picture Show	Frank -n- Furter	Regional
2006	I Am My Own Wife	Charlotte et al.	Regional
2006	Metamorphoses	Phaeton/Ceyx	with Artists Repertory Theatre
2006	Assassins	Balladeer/Lee Harvey Oswald	with Artists Repertory Theatre
2007	Toy Story the Musical	Woody	Disney Development
2007	Jersey Boys	Norm Waxman	with Chicago Company
2008,2011	Cabaret	Emcee	Regional, with Dallas Theatre Center
2009-2010	The Sanataland Diaries	Crumpet	with Portland Center Stage
2010	Fly By Night	Narrator	World Premier, with Theatreworks in Palo Alto
2010	Dracula	Dracula	Regional
2010	Angels In America	Prior Walter	Regional
2011	The Santaland Diaries	Crumpet et al	Regional
2011	Dying City	Peter/Craig	Regional
2012	Priscilla Queen of the Desert	Tick/Mitzi	US National Tour
2013	Triassic Parq	Velociraptor of Faith	Off- Broadway
2014	Wicked	Witch’s Father u/s Wizard & Dillamond	Broadway
2015-2017	Ernest Shackleton Loves Me	Ernest Shackleton et al	Off-Broadway (World Premier)
2018	It Happened in Key West	Carl Von Cosel	West End (World Premier)
2018	The Carpenter	Gene	Regional (World Premier)
2019	A Welcome Guest	Shimeus	Regional (World Premier)
2019-2022	My Fair Lady	Karpathy u/s Henry Higgins	US National Tour
2022	Make Me Gorgeous: The Kenneth Marlowe Story	Kenneth et al.	Regional (World Premier)
2023	Water For Elephants	Wade	Alliance Theatre (World Premier)
2023-2024	Make Me Gorgeous	Kenneth/Kate/et al	Off Broadway
2024	Water for Elephants	Wade u/s August	Broadway
2025	Floyd Collins	Bee Doyle u/s Floyd Collins	Broadway
2025	Italian American Reconciliation	Huey Maximilian Bonfigliano	Off-Broadway
2026	Freak the Mighty	Kenny "Killer" Kane	Regional (World Premier)
2026	Zombie Ant Fungus: the chemistry of control	Autofictional Scientist	London's Royal Institution (World Premier)

=== Awards ===
Year	Award	Category	Work	Result
2002	Drammy Award	Best Actor in a Musical	Hedwig and the Angry Inch	Won
2003	Drammy Award	Best Actor in a Musical	Batboy	Won
2004	Ovation Awards	Best Actor in a Musical	Hedwig and the Angry Inch	Nominated
2004	Backstage West’s Garland Award	Best Actor in a Musical	Hedwig and the Angry Inch	Won
2004	Los Angeles Drama Critic’s Circle Award	Best Actor in a Musical	Hedwig and the Angry Inch	Won
2011	Dallas Fort Worth Theater Critics Forum AwardDrama Critic’s Circle Award	Best Actor in a Musical	Cabaret	Won
2016	Boston Theatre Critic’s Association Elliot Norton Award	Best Actor in a Musical	Ernest Shackleton Loves Me	Won
2017	Lucille Lortel Award	Best Actor in a Musical	Ernest Shackleton Loves Me	Nominated
2024	Off-Broadway Alliance Award	Best Solo Performance	Make Me Gorgeous!	Won
2024	Lucille Lortel Award	Best Solo Show	Make Me Gorgeous!	Nominated
2024	Drama Desk Award	Best Solo Performance	Make Me Gorgeous!	Nominated
