= Kate Wetherhead =

American actor, writer, and director

- Born: September 10; Burlington, Vermont, United States
- Education: Wesleyan University (BA); Circle in the Square Theatre School
- Occupations: Actress, singer, writer, director, television producer
- Years active: 2002–present
- Notable work: The Devil Wears Prada Submissions Only; Legally Blonde The Musical Ordinary Days; Jack and Louisa Book Series
- Spouse: Jeff Croiter

Kate Wetherhead is an American actress, writer and director known for her work on The Devil Wears Prada the Musical, Submissions Only, Legally Blonde, Ordinary Days, and the Jack and Louisa book series.

== Early life and education ==
Kate was born in Burlington, Vermont, to Christine and Arnold Wetherhead. She began acting at age six and writing at seven. Wetherhead found her love for theatre after seeing a local production of West Side Story. She appeared in several shows at the University of Vermont, including Cat on a Hot Tin Roof and The Miracle Worker. She has a bachelor's degree in English from Wesleyan University and trained as an actor at Circle in the Square Theatre School.

== Career ==
Wetherhead began her career in children's theatre, appearing off-Broadway in Sarah, Plain and Tall, Tatjana in Color, Summer of the Swans, and Cam Jansen, as well as touring with A Christmas Carol. She made her Broadway debut in 2005 in The 25th Annual Putnam County Spelling Bee as the understudy for Olive Ostrovsky, Logainne Schwartzandgrubenierre, and Marcy Park. She left the show to originate the roles of Kate and Chutney in the Broadway production of Legally Blonde. She left Legally Blonde in 2008, performing in such shows as Almost, Maine, Emmet Otter's Jug-Band Christmas, and Steel Magnolias. In 2009 she starred as Deb in Ordinary Days by Adam Gwon for Roundabout Theatre Company.

In 2010, she met Andrew Keenan-Bolger in a regional production of It's a Bird... It's a Plane... It's Superman, and, after collaborating on a behind-the-scenes video for the production, they decided to make a series together. The two created the show Submissions Only, with Wetherhead writing and directing as well as playing the protagonist, Penny Reilly. In 2012, she returned to Off-Broadway in The Other Josh Cohen, for which she received a Drama Desk Award nomination. Submissions Only ended its third and final season in 2014. From 2013 to 2016, Wetherhead and Keenan-Bolger co-wrote the three-part children's book series Jack & Louisa, published by Penguin Group. The two also have a feature film in development with Sycamore Pictures.

In 2018, Wetherhead made her theatrical directorial debut at Bucks County Playhouse, directing Cinderella. She has since directed Shrek The Musical for the playhouse, along with developmental readings and workshops for New York University and Michigan State University.

In March 2021 it was announced that Wetherhead would write a musical adaptation of The Devil Wears Prada. The Devil Wears Prada opened in October 2024 at the Dominion Theatre with a score by Elton John, lyrics by Shaina Taub and Mark Sonnenblick, book by Kate Wetherhead, and direction and choreography by Tony Award winner Jerry Mitchell (Kinky Boots, Legally Blonde, Hairspray).

== Personal life ==
Wetherhead is married to Tony Award winning lighting designer Jeff Croiter.

== Theatre ==
Year	Show	Role	Notes	Ref.
2001	A Christmas Carol	Ensemble	TheatreWorksUSA	
2002	Sarah, Plain and Tall	Anna	Lucille Lortel Theatre	
2002	The Spitfire Grill	Percy	Skylight Opera Theatre	
2003	Summer of the Swans	Sara	Lucille Lortel Theatre	
2003	Tatjana in Color	Tatjana	The Culture Project	
2004	Cam Jansen and the Curse of the Emerald Elephant	Cam Jansen	The Lamb's Theatre	
2005	The 25th Annual Putnam County Spelling Bee	Understudy for Olive Ostrovsky, Marcy Park, and Logainne Schwartzandgrubenierre	Broadway, 2005–2006	
2006	Sarah, Plain and Tall	Anna	Off-Broadway	
2006	Dear Edwina	Edwina Spoonapple	Rattlestick Playwrights Theater	
2007	Legally Blonde	Chutney/Kate	Broadway, April 3, 2007 – February 25, 2008	
2008	Almost, Maine	Various	St. Michael's Playhouse, July 2008	
2008	Steel Magnolias	Annelle	Paper Mill Playhouse	
2008	Emmet Otter's Jug-Band Christmas	Jane	Goodspeed Musicals, December 7, 2008 – January 4, 2009	
2009	Ordinary Days	Deb	Roundabout Theatre Company	
2010	James and the Giant Peach	Spider	Goodspeed Musicals	
2010	It's a Bird... It's a Plane... It's Superman	Blackbird/Clark's Kryptonian Mother	Dallas Theater Center	
2011	Cabaret	Sally Bowles	Dallas Theater Center, April 22 – May 22, 2011	
2012	The Other Josh Cohen	A Lot of People	Off-Broadway, October 10 – November 11, 2012	
2013	Clever Little Lies	Jane	George Street Playhouse, November 19 – December 22, 2013	
2014	The Other Josh Cohen	A Lot of People	Paper Mill Playhouse, February 19 – March 15, 2014	
2014	The Heidi Chronicles	Heidi Holland	Guthrie Theatre	
2015	Company	Amy	Bucks County Playhouse	
2015	Clever Little Lies	Jane	Westside Theatre, October 13, 2015 – March 20, 2016	
2016	God Bless You, Mr. Rosewater	Company	Encores! City Center	
2017	Ebenezer Scrooge's Big Playhouse Christmas Show	Woman 1	New Hope Playhouse	
2017	Hurricane Diane	Beth	Two River Theater	
2018	The Other Josh Cohen	A Lot of People	Westside Theatre	
2019	Hurricane Diane	Beth	New York Theatre Workshop	
2020	Your Best One	Laura	Capital Repertory Theatre	
2024	Burlesque	N/A	Additional playwright	
2024	The Devil Wears Prada	N/A	Playwright	

== Filmography ==
Year	Title	Role	Notes
2007	Legally Blonde: The Musical	Kate/Chutney	Filmed stage production
2010–2014	Submissions Only	Penny Reilly	22 episodes
2012	The Big C	Mousse Girl	Episode: "Bundle of Joy"
2015	Serial: The TV Show	Sarah Koenig	Short; also writer and director
2016	The Ceiling Fan	Woman	Short; also writer and director
2017	The Marvelous Mrs. Maisel	Polly	Episode: "The Disappointment of the Dionne Quintuplets"
2017	The Late Show with Stephen Colbert	Kate	Sketch: "The Emperors New Wall"
2018	Awkwardly (TV Series)	Mary	2 episode; also director

== Writing credits ==
Release	Title	Notes
	Submissions Only	TV Series
	The Ceiling Fan	Film
	Jack and Louisa: Act 1	Book Series with Andrew Keenan-Bolger
	Jack and Louisa: Act 2	Book Series with Andrew Keenan-Bolger
	Jack and Louisa: Act 3	Book Series with Andrew Keenan-Bolger
	A Theatre Camp Movie	Film
	Burlesque	Musical
	The Devil Wears Prada the Musical	Musical
	Ever After	Musical

The Baby-Sitters Club Musical

== Concerts ==
Year	Title	Notes
2014	Submissions Only Live at 54 Below	Sang in "More of You", "Steal Away", "Uh Oh", "I Got a Reading", "Where I'm Supposed to Be", and "Nobody Does Mean Like Me"; also introduced "Chin in My Hands" and "Why Must the Show Go On"

== Discography ==
Year	Title	Notes
2002	Sarah, Plain and Tall	Anna
2006	Finding Nemo – The Musical	Nemo
2007	Legally Blonde: The Musical (original Broadway cast recording)	Featured vocals
2010	Ordinary Days (original cast recording)	Deb
2015	Submissions Only (Original Soundtrack)	Various
2017	God Bless You, Mr. Rosewater	Dawn, Caroline

== Awards and nominations ==
Year	Award	Category	Nominee	Result
2007	Actors' Equity Association Award	Outstanding Broadway Ensemble	Legally Blonde	Won
2013	Drama Desk Award	Outstanding Featured Actress in a Musical	The Other Josh Cohen	Nominated
