= Lindsay Nicole Chambers =

American actress and singer (born 1981)

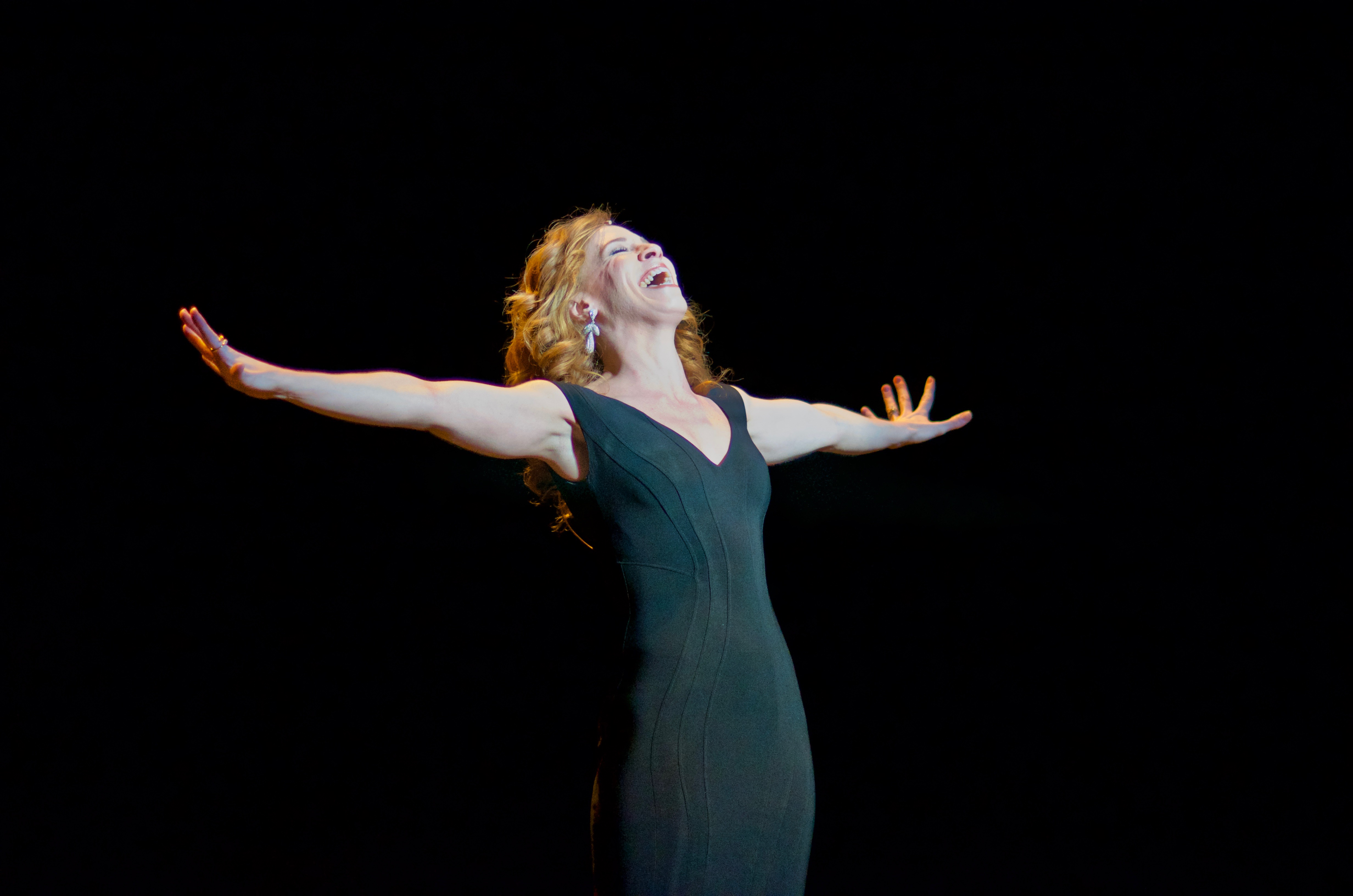
- Chambers in 2016
- Born: Lindsay Nicole Chambers; April 22, 1980 (age 46); Lafayette, Indiana, U.S.
- Other name: Lindsay Chambers
- Occupations: Actress, singer
- Years active: 2002–present
- Spouse: Chris Barron (m. 2012)

Lindsay Nicole Chambers (born April 22, 1980) is an American actress and singer, known for her work on Broadway and in Submissions Only.

== Career ==
Chambers understudied the female authority figure and Penny Pingleton in the touring production of Hairspray from 2004 to 2005. She moved to Broadway in 2006. She left to be a swing in Broadway's Legally Blonde. She later began understudying Enid in the production instead. In 2009, she played several characters in Perez Hilton Saves the Universe (or at least the greater Los Angeles area): the Musical! off-off-Broadway, and in 2010, she began playing Gail Liner on Submissions Only. She played Robin in Lysistrata Jones off-Broadway and on Broadway in 2012. Once it closed, she played Jovie on the tour of Elf. She played the Velocirapter of Science in Triassic Parq off-Broadway and appeared in the off-Broadway revue Forbidden Broadway: Alive and Kicking, and as Robyn in Sex Tips For Straight Women From A Gay Man before playing Lauren in the national tour of Kinky Boots, beginning in 2014. She left the tour in 2015.

== Personal life ==
On February 14, 2012, Chambers married Chris Barron, the lead singer for the band Spin Doctors.

== Theatre credits ==
Year	Show	Role	Notes
Unknown	All Shook Up	Natalie/Ed	Carousel Dinner Theatre
Unknown	Ginger	Myrtle	Otterbein Theatre
2002	Chicago	Annie	Maine State Music Theatre
2002	Chicago	Annie	Maine State Music Theatre
2002	She Loves Me	Ilona (u/s)	Regional, Sep/Oct 2002
2003	Hairspray	Swing/Female Authority Figure (u/s)/Penny Pingleton (u/s)	National tour, 2003–04
2004	Hairspray	Denizen of Baltimore/Female Authority Figure (u/s)/Penny Pingleton (u/s)- (replacement)	Broadway, 2004–06
2007	Legally Blonde	Swing/Enid (u/s)- (replacement)	Broadway, 2007–08
2008	Perez Hilton Saves the Universe (or at least the greater Los Angeles area): the Musical!	Lady Gaga/Amy Winehouse/Joan Rivers/Mary Kate Olsen	New York Fringe Festival
2009	Perez Hilton Saves the Universe (or at least the greater Los Angeles area): the Musical!	Lady Gaga/Amy Winehouse/Joan Rivers/Mary Kate Olsen	off-off-Broadway
2010	Give It Up	Robin	Dallas Theater Center, Jan 15 – February 14, 2010
2010	All Shook Up	Natalie/Ed	Arvada Center, June/July 2010
2011	Lysistrata Jones	Robin	off-Broadway, May/June 2011
2011	Lysistrata Jones	Robin	Broadway, December 14, 2011 – January 8, 2012
2012	Elf	Jovie	National tour
2012	Forbidden Broadway: Alive and Kicking	Various	off-Broadway, July 24, 2012 – January 6, 2013
2013	Frog Kiss	EveryWoman	New York Fringe Festival
2013	Triassic Parq	Velociraptor of Science	off-Broadway
2014	Kinky Boots	Lauren	National Tour, 2014–15
2015	Sex Tips to Straight Women From a Gay Man	Robyn	off-Broadway

== Film credits ==
Year	Title	Role	Notes
2007	Across the Universe	Dancer	

== Television credits ==
Year	Title	Role	Notes
2010–14	Submissions Only	Gail Liner	22 episodes
2019	Fosse/Verdon	Leland Palmer	2 episodes
2021	Dickinson	Opera Chorus Member 2	Episode: "Split the Lark"
2025	Elsbeth	Steph	2 episodes
