= Lysistrata Jones =

Musical

- Opening Night Playbill Cover
- Music: Lewis Flinn
- Lyrics: Lewis Flinn
- Book: Douglas Carter Beane
- Basis: Lysistrata by Aristophanes
- Productions: 2011 Broadway

Lysistrata Jones is a musical comedy adaptation of Aristophanes' comedy Lysistrata. The book is by Douglas Carter Beane and the score is by Lewis Flinn. After a critically acclaimed off-Broadway run with Transport Group Theatre Company, the show opened on Broadway in December 2011 and closed in January 2012. The show tells the tale of the men on a losing college basketball team whose cheerleader girlfriends refuse to have sex with them until they win a game.

== Premise ==
The plot of the musical is inspired by the plot of the ancient Greek play Lysistrata, with some artistic liberties to bring the story in to the 21st century. In the original play, Lysistrata leads the women of Athens to stop having sex with their husbands and lovers until the long-lasting Peloponnesian War is finally ended. In the musical, the men's basketball team at fictional Athens University has lost every game for the last 30 years when a cheerleader named Lysistrata "Lyssie J." Jones transfers to the school. Lyssie J. inspires the girls at the school to stop having sex with the team members until they finally win a game.

== Productions ==
The musical premiered at the Dallas Theater Center, running from January 15 to February 14, 2010 under the title Give It Up!

It was next produced by Transport Group at the Judson gymnasium in Greenwich Village in May and June 2011. The show began previews on Broadway at the Walter Kerr Theatre on November 12, 2011 and officially opened on December 14, 2011. It was directed and choreographed by Dan Knechtges, with sets by Allen Moyer, costumes by David C. Woolard and Thomas Charles LeGalley and lighting by Michael Gottlieb. The musical closed on January 8, 2012 after 34 previews and 30 regular performances. According to Playbill, "The usually powerful chief critic of the New York Times raved about it downtown and uptown, penning a genuine 'money' review for its commercial transfer, but, ultimately, there was not enough box-office interest to support the starless musical."

A majority of the original cast reunited for a one-night-only concert version of the show at Joe's Pub on April 9, 2012.

Lysistrata Jones returned to New York at the Ophelia Theatre, Astoria on March 16, 2018.

== Characters and original cast ==
Character	Dallas Theater Center (2010)	Walter Kerr Theatre, Broadway (2011)
Lysistrata Jones	Patti Murin	Patti Murin
Hetaira	Liz Mikel	Liz Mikel
Michelangelo "Mick" Jackson	Andrew Rannells	Josh Segarra
Xander Lee	Curtis Holbrook	Jason Tam
Robin Smythe	Lindsay Nicole Chambers	Lindsay Nicole Chambers
Myrrhine Moore	Carla Duren	LaQuet Sharnell
Cinesias Ray	Telly Leung	Alex Wyse
‘Uardo Cortez	Xavier Cano	Alexander Aguilar
Stratyllis "Tyllis" Carter	Justin Keyes	Ato Blankson-Wood
Lampito Kanagawa	Katie Boren	Katie Boren
Cleonice Sanchez	Noemi Del Rio	Kat Nejat
Harold *	Preston Sadleir	Teddy Toye

* In the pre-Broadway production, the character of Harold is called Gustaf Angstrom.

== Musical numbers ==
Act I

- "Right Now" – Company
- "Party Time – Right Now" – Hetaira & Company
- "Just Once" – Lysistrata and Robin [song was added during the Broadway run]
- "Change the World" – Lysistrata and Girls
- "No More Giving It Up" – Girls
- "Lay Low" – Mick, Cinesias and Boys
- "I Don't Think So" – Hetaira and Girls
- "You Go Your Way" – Company
- "Where Am I Now" – Lysistrata

Act II

- "Writing on the Wall" – Hetaira and Company
- "Hold On" – Xander, Lysistrata & Hetaira
- "Don't Judge a Book" – Myrrhine and Cinesias
- "Right Now Operetta" – Company
- "When She Smiles" – Mick
- "Hold On – Reprise" – Hetaira & Lysistrata
- "Give It Up" – Company

== Reception ==
Transport Group's production received universally good reviews. Review aggregator Did He Like It shows "thumbs up" from all five leading critics. Ben Brantley of the New York Times called the show "effervescent, tasty and surprisingly filling." Steven Suskin in Variety issued praise for "a plot that launches a thousand laffs, old and new...[with] jokes about Amelia Earhart and Kitty Dukakis in the same exchange -- both of which land." David Rooney of The Hollywood Reporter said the show was "an obscene amount of fun". David Sheward in Backstage pointed out "Each of the characters starts out as a broad stereotype—just as Aristophanes' figures are—but Beane turns the cultural expectations inside out, creating complex people within a comic context."

Brantley reviewed the Broadway production favorably: "the production that opened on Wednesday night at the Walter Kerr Theater warrants not only sighs of relief but also at least a few lusty cheers."

== Cast recording ==
Broadway Records released the original cast recording of the Broadway musical, Lysistrata Jones, featuring music and lyrics by Lewis Flinn and book by Tony Award nominee Douglas Carter Beane. The recording was released on Tuesday, May 15, 2012. The album features the complete Broadway score as well as a special bonus track.

The album is produced by Lewis Flinn and Dean Sharenow. Van Dean and Kenny Howard are executive producers, along with Douglas Carter Beane, Sase Sham, Jana Shea, and David Huntington. The liner notes will include essays from the creative team, as well as complete lyrics. The track listing is as follows:

1. Right Now (Opening)
2. Right Now (Party Time)
3. Just Once
4. Change the World
5. No More Giving It Up
6. Lay Low
7. I Don't Think So
8. You Go Your Way
9. Where Am I Now?
10. Writing on the Wall
11. Hold On
12. Don't Judge a Book
13. Right Now (Operetta)
14. When She Smiles
15. Hold On (reprise)
16. The Final Game
17. Give it Up!
18. Never Say Never (Curtain Call)
19. Bonus Track: Hold On (with Jennifer Holliday)

== Awards and nominations ==
=== Original Broadway production ===
Year	Award	Category	Nominee	Result
2012	Tony Award	Best Book of a Musical	Douglas Carter Beane	Nominated
2012	Drama Desk Award	Outstanding Book of a Musical	Douglas Carter Beane	Nominated
2012	Astaire Award	Outstanding Female Dancer in a Broadway Show	Patti Murin	Nominated
2012	Astaire Award	Outstanding Male Dancer in a Broadway Show	Jason Tam	Nominated
2012	American Theatre Wing's Henry Hewes Design Award Nominations	Costume Design	David C. Woolard and Thomas Charles LeGalley	Nominated

== Film ==
It was announced that Lysistrata Jones will be made into a film directed by Andy Fickman.
