= Submissions Only =

- Genre: Comedy
- Created by: Kate Wetherhead; Andrew Keenan-Bolger
- Starring: Kate Wetherhead; Colin Hanlon; Stephen Bienskie; Lindsay Nicole Chambers; Asmeret Ghebremichael; Santino Fontana; Donna Vivino; Max von Essen; Marilyn Sokol
- Composers: Adam Wachter; Michael Croiter
- Country of origin: United States
- Original language: English
- No. of seasons: 3
- No. of episodes: 22

Production
- Producers: Jeff Croiter; Michael Croiter; Jen Namoff; Teon Cromwell; Joanna Harmon; Tom Rice; Jack Sharkey
- Production locations: New York City, New York
- Running time: 15–22 minutes

Original release
- Network: YouTube; BroadwayWorld
- Release: October 16, 2010 – June 8, 2014

Submissions Only is a comedy web series about the casting and audition process for Broadway theater. It centers around aspiring actress Penny Reilly (Kate Wetherhead) and her friend, casting agency director Tim Trull (Colin Hanlon), and their circle of friends, colleagues, relationships and family. The series was created in August 2010 by Broadway performers Wetherhead and Andrew Keenan-Bolger. Wetherhead is the series' writer, while Keenan-Bolger is the main director and editor.

The series has had three seasons. The first season premiered in October 2010 and had six episodes, the second season premiered in September 2011 and had eight episodes, and the third season premiered in March 2014 and had eight episodes. Most episodes are 15–20 minutes long. The first season was produced on a minuscule budget, and was shown on YouTube. The second and third seasons had significantly larger budget, and higher production quality. Episodes from the second and third seasons were originally shown exclusively on Broadway World's website, which also partially funded the project, but were both eventually released on YouTube. Most of the funding for the second and third seasons was solicited through the website Kickstarter. Broadway producer Kevin McCollum was a producing partner for the third season.

== Characters ==
=== Main ===
- Penny Reilly (Kate Wetherhead) – an aspiring Broadway actress who remains optimistic despite a variety of setbacks
- Tim Trull (Colin Hanlon) – the head of a casting agency, and Penny's best friend
- Steven Ferrell (Stephen Bienskie) – Penny's agent and Tim's ex-boyfriend
- Aaron Miller (Santino Fontana) – a talented but blasé actor, and Penny's occasional love interest
- Gail Liner (Lindsay Nicole Chambers) – Tim's secretary, who is disdainful of nearly everyone, including Tim
- Cameron Dante (Max von Essen) – a former actor and Steven's boyfriend (recurring first and second seasons, main third season)
- Linda Avery (Anne L. Nathan) – a lascivious director who doesn't realize that most of the men she flirts with are gay
- Serena Maxwell (Donna Vivino) – a Broadway star, and Aaron's girlfriend (recurring second season, main third season)
- Raina Pearl (Asmeret Ghebremichael) – Penny's roommate, also a Broadway actress (main first and second season, recurring third season)
- Randall Moody (Jared Gertner) – Tim's former reader, and an annoyingly enthusiastic Broadway-lover (recurring second season, guest third season)
- Nolan Grigsby (Wade McCollum) – an eccentric, independently wealthy director who has developed a compass-based theory of acting (recurring second season, main third season)
- Agnes Vetrulli (Marilyn Sokol) – a friendly but batty actress who replaces Randall as Tim's reader (main third season)

=== Recurring ===
- Eric Hennigan (Patrick Heusinger) – a strait-laced actor on whom Penny harbors a crush (first season only)
- Val Reilly (Beth Leavel) – Penny's mother, who is always saving magazine articles for Penny to read
- Don Martin (Rick Elice) – Penny's stepfather, who is always trying to hit on girls and get into the acting game
- Donny Rich (Andrew Keenan-Bolger) – a snobby casting assistant
- "Adorable Girl" (Annaleigh Ashford) – a bubbly actress who seems to know everyone and compliments people on how thin they look
- Andy Edmond (Jeffrey Kuhn) – a catty music director
- Rick Valencia (Kevin Pariseau) – a middle-aged actor who is very verbose about the audition process

== Episodes ==
=== Season 1 (2010–2011) ===
No. overall	No. in season	Title	Directed by	Written by	Length	Original release date
1	1	"Old Lace"	Kate Wetherhead and Andrew Keenan-Bolger	Kate Wetherhead and Andrew Keenan-Bolger	22:18	October 16, 2010
Tim has to cast an entire festival of short plays. Penny, who has just returned to New York from Los Angeles, worries that she has become irrelevant. Penny serves as a reader for Tim during his auditions, where she re-connects with her long-time crush, Eric.
2	2	"165 Flies"	Kate Wetherhead and Andrew Keenan-Bolger	Kate Wetherhead and Andrew Keenan-Bolger	18:39	December 5, 2010
Linda asks Tim to cast a prestigious new play, Iron Dog, which will be running in Boston. Eric tells Penny about a new acting class he's taking, and Raina convinces Penny to attend. Tim and Steven, who recently broke up, unknowingly flirt with each other on a dating site. The acting class turns out to be ridiculous, and Penny and fellow student Aaron bond while making fun of it.
3	3	"Intersections"	Kate Wetherhead and Andrew Keenan-Bolger	Kate Wetherhead and Andrew Keenan-Bolger	21:48	January 17, 2011
Penny participates in a reading for the musical Intersections, whose cast is led by Eric. While Penny is away, Tim calls Aaron as a substitute reader for Iron Dog. During the Intersections rehearsals, Penny is annoyed by the flirting between Eric and the female lead. The Intersections reading is disappointing.
4	4	"Yore So Bad"	Kate Wetherhead and Andrew Keenan-Bolger	Kate Wetherhead	15:52	March 3, 2011
Penny and Aaron both serve as readers for Tim for the Iron Dog auditions. Steven meets Cameron, who comes in to potentially get signed but reveals that he doesn't want to be an actor any longer, and Steven is smitten. Penny has a traumatic experience auditioning for experimental dance troupe "DaBoSeRoy".
5	5	"Mean Like Me"	Kate Wetherhead and Andrew Keenan-Bolger	Kate Wetherhead with Andrew Keenan-Bolger	16:21	April 2, 2011
Aaron helps Penny with her own planned audition for Iron Dog, and confesses that he is applying to law schools. Penny auditions for a touring production of a Mean Girls musical. Eric comes in for the Iron Dog audition, and Aaron, annoyed at and jealous of Eric, delivers a bravura performance reading opposite him. Linda decides that she wants Aaron to audition for the play. Penny becomes taken with Aaron and the two go out on a date, but Aaron doesn't tell her about his good news in order to spare her feelings.
6	6	"Somethin' Else"	Kate Wetherhead and Andrew Keenan-Bolger	Kate Wetherhead	18:44	May 12, 2011
Tim keeps the news about Aaron a secret from Penny. At a party for potential investors for Iron Dog, Linda meets Steven and his new boyfriend Cameron, and Steven reveals to Linda that Tim is gay. Penny auditions for Iron Dog. Penny finds out that Aaron was asked to audition, and was cast, and the two have a fight. Penny gets cast in the Mean Girls musical.

=== Season 2 (2011–2012) ===
No. overall	No. in season	Title	Directed by	Written by	Length	Original release date
7	1	"Harness Malfunction"	Kate Wetherhead and Andrew Keenan-Bolger	Kate Wetherhead	16:56	September 30, 2011
Tim has a new reader, Randall. Penny returns to New York after a harness malfunction during a performance of Mean Girls caused her to sprain her hip, forcing her to leave the tour, and she finds that the news of her injury has turned into a Broadway-wide rumor that she "broke her vagina". Linda tells Penny that Iron Dog was moved from Boston to New York, and that everyone in the cast and crew was replaced except Aaron.
8	2	"Gay Gardens"	Kate Wetherhead and Andrew Keenan-Bolger	Kate Wetherhead	18:31	October 28, 2011
Tim goes to the Berkshires to see a play he cast; he drives Penny there as well, so she can stay at Steven and Cameron's summer house. A leaky roof where Tim was staying forces him to also stay with Steven and Cameron.
9	3	"2/3 Memorized"	Kate Wetherhead and Andrew Keenan-Bolger	Kate Wetherhead	18:51	November 25, 2011
Tim finds out about an opportunity to work with director Nolan Grigsby. Aaron gets signed with Steven's casting agency. Penny's mother and stepfather come to visit her. Penny's stepfather accompanies Penny to an audition for a musical, and ends up getting called to audition, then gets a callback, while Penny doesn't.
10	4	"The Miller/Hennigan Act"	Kate Wetherhead and Andrew Keenan-Bolger	Kate Wetherhead	21:50	December 30, 2011
Penny decides that she will no longer date actors. Tim asks Penny to be his reader for a Civil War play because Randall is away on a tour. Nolan comes to New York, meets Tim, and sits in on the auditions. Penny, sexually frustrated, breaks her own rule by dating three actors. Nolan asks Tim to cast his new play. Penny auditions for a new musical, Piñata Party, where she runs into Aaron and finds out that he's now dating a Broadway star, Serena Maxwell.
11	5	"Y'all Were Great"	Kate Wetherhead and Andrew Keenan-Bolger	Kate Wetherhead	18:32	January 27, 2012
Penny and Aaron end up at Steven's office at the same time, and Penny, in an effort to avoid Aaron, hides under the table. Penny and Randall meet Serena, who tells them she'll be starring in a new musical, Jeremy's Fort. Steven and Cameron attend the Iron Dog opening night in New York, which turns out to be a disaster due to the new director.
12	6	"Woof!"	Kate Wetherhead and Andrew Keenan-Bolger	Kate Wetherhead	20:43	March 2, 2012
Iron Dog's New York opening night has received terrible reviews. Tim, Randall and Gail assist Nolan in auditions for his play, based on Nolan's "Compass-ition" theories. Penny and Raina go to an acting class where Serena is also present, and Serena is bereft due to the bad reviews. Penny and Tim attend an office promotion party for Steven, which Aaron also attends. Penny and Aaron, who realize neither one has seen the reviews yet, leave the party so they can finally read them.
13	7	"The Growing Interconnectedness"	Kate Wetherhead and Andrew Keenan-Bolger	Kate Wetherhead	17:56	March 30, 2012
Nolan continues with his unorthodox audition process. Tim, inspired by Nolan's physical prowess, invites Penny and Raina to a fitness class. Penny auditions to play Serena's crippled sister for Jeremy's Fort, and Penny's stiffness from the exercise helps her nail the part. Aaron tells Penny that Iron Dog is closing, and that he's still attracted to her. Nolan massages Tim due to Tim's own stiffness, and Tim discovers that there is romantic chemistry between the two.
14	8	"Another Interruption"	Kate Wetherhead and Andrew Keenan-Bolger	Kate Wetherhead	23:29	April 27, 2012
Penny gets a callback for Jeremy's Fort, but is unsure whether to go or not, due to the love triangle that now exists between her, Aaron and Serena. Tim realizes that he is attracted to Nolan, but doesn't know whether to make his feelings known. Penny is convinced by her friends and family to attend the callbacks. Gail, aware of Tim's feelings, makes up a reason for Nolan to see Tim again before he is set to leave New York; Tim confesses his feelings, and Nolan reciprocates, although Nolan then has to leave. Penny gets cast in Jeremy's Fort. Penny goes to see Iron Dog on one of its last nights, and tells Aaron afterward that she is still attracted to him as well; the two kiss, but decide to keep any relationship on hold until the end of the run for Jeremy's Fort.

=== Season 3 (2014) ===
No. overall	No. in season	Title	Directed by	Written by	Length	Original release date
15	1	"Petit Sweet Ending with N"	Kate Wetherhead and Andrew Keenan-Bolger	Kate Wetherhead	22:06	March 3, 2014
Randall leaves for a six-month job as a cruise ship entertainer. Jeremy's Fort rehearsals are awkward for Penny. Aaron decides to leave the city for a while to decide about his love life.
16	2	"Having Foresight"	Kate Wetherhead and Andrew Keenan-Bolger	Kate Wetherhead	23:55	March 17, 2014
Raina leaves New York to film a TV pilot in Los Angeles. Tim and Gail struggle to find a replacement for Randall, eventually settling on Agnes. Penny finds out from Serena that Aaron has left the city. A video of the director of Jeremy's Fort insulting the theater's artistic director leaks onto the internet.
17	3	"Box of Dirt"	Kate Wetherhead and Andrew Keenan-Bolger	Kate Wetherhead	23:02	March 31, 2014
Aaron has decided to apply to law schools, which leaves Serena bereft. Tim gets a gift package from Nolan full of inexplicable items. After the director is fired from Jeremy's Fort, Linda Avery is hired to take his place.
18	4	"Expectations"	Kate Wetherhead and Andrew Keenan-Bolger	Kate Wetherhead	TBA	April 14, 2014
An unexpected visit from Nolan leads both Tim and Nolan, and Steven and Cameron, to reassess their relationships. Penny unsuccessfully looks for a roommate. A "game night" at Serena's apartment turns awkward for Penny.
19	5	"Very Meta"	Kate Wetherhead and Andrew Keenan-Bolger	Kate Wetherhead	TBA	April 28, 2014
Penny has found new roommates. Penny and Aaron have a chance encounter. Gail saves Tim during a challenging meeting with Vincent Savio.
20	6	"Dangerous Anaesthesia"	Kate Wetherhead and Andrew Keenan-Bolger	Kate Wetherhead	25:20	May 12, 2014
Gail has decided to become a real casting director, and Tim and Agnes put her through her paces. Serena invites Penny, the show's assistant director Josh, and Aaron to a "double date" at a piano bar to promote Jeremy's Fort, but the night ends on a sour note.
21	7	"Chapter #2"	Kate Wetherhead and Andrew Keenan-Bolger	Kate Wetherhead	25:54	May 26, 2014
A month after their falling out, Serena and Penny remain not on speaking terms, though Jeremy's Fort is a success. Gail manages to steer Vincent Savio toward auditioning talented performers, despite his unorthodox requests. Penny and Aaron have a chance meeting, where Aaron delivers sad news.
22	8	"Reason to Stay"	Kate Wetherhead and Andrew Keenan-Bolger	Kate Wetherhead	27:31	June 8, 2014
The reading for Vincent Savio's musical, Light Me Up, leads to an unexpected reconciliation. Aaron crashes Steven and Cameron's engagement party to tell her something that will change both of their plans for the future.

== Production ==
The impetus for the series was a series of backstage videos that Keenan-Bolger recorded for Music Theatre International, titled Keenan Blogger. Several of the videos were recorded while Keenan-Bolger was in the cast of a production of It's a Bird...It's a Plane...It's Superman in Dallas in 2010, and Wetherhead, who was also a cast member, assisted in their production. Wetherhead's husband, who was the show's lighting designer, suggested they create a web series together.

All of the audition material shown is from fake plays and musicals, with dialogue and lyrics written by Wetherhead. For musical numbers, the music was written by Adam Gwon, Adam Wachter, Keith Varney and others.

Most of the actors who have appeared on the series are Broadway performers who are friends and acquaintances of the creators.

== Cameos ==
Submissions Only has included cameos by Broadway veterans such as Chita Rivera, Kristin Chenoweth, Audra McDonald, Hunter Foster, Adam Pascal, Jeremy Jordan, Danny Burstein and Brian D'Arcy James, Kelli O'Hara, Heidi Blickenstaff, Lin-Manuel Miranda, actors such as Rachel Dratch, Kristen Johnston, Michael Urie, Bobby Cannavale and Judith Light, and New York Post theater critic Michael Riedel. The last episode of season two notably had a large number of cameos, including appearances by Jesse Tyler Ferguson, Nick Jonas, Harvey Fierstein, Jack Falahee, and many ensemble members from the Broadway cast of Newsies.
