= Kalitta =

Kalitta may refer to:

== Companies ==
- Kalitta Air, an American cargo airline flying Boeing 747 and 777 aircraft
  - Kalitta Air Flight 207, a flight that crashed on takeoff in 2008 at Brussels Airport injuring several occupants
- Kalitta Charters, an American cargo airline flying medium-sized aircraft such as Boeing 737

== People ==
- Connie Kalitta (born 1938), American retired drag racer and CEO of the eponymous Kalitta Air
- Doug Kalitta (born 1964), American drag racer, nephew of Connie Kalitta and owner of Kalitta Charters
- Scott Kalitta (1962–2008), American drag racer and son of Connie Kalitta

== See also ==
- Kalita (disambiguation)
