= Lisa Brescia =

American musical theatre actress

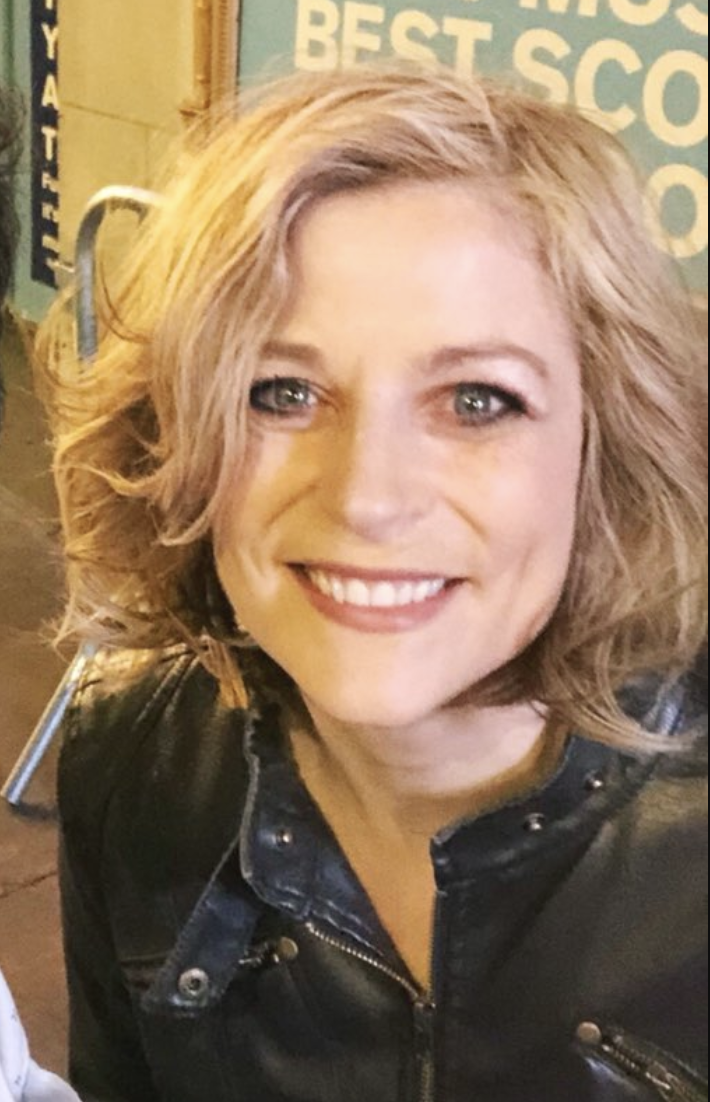
- Brescia after a performance of Dear Evan Hansen in 2019 taken by Tony Barone
- Born: May 12, 1970 (age 56); Sioux Falls, South Dakota, U.S.
- Occupation: Actress
- Spouse: Craig Carnelia

Lisa Brescia (born May 12, 1970) is an American musical theatre actress who has performed as lead and understudy in several Broadway shows. Raised in Milwaukee, Wisconsin, she went on to pursue acting and graduated from the American Academy of Dramatic Arts. She taught Acting I and IV at Missouri State University and is now set to be the head of the Musical Theatre department at Stephens College in Columbia, Missouri.

On August 7, 2018, Brescia began a run as Heidi Hansen in Dear Evan Hansen on Broadway.

== Career ==
Brescia was lead singer in The New Mamas and The Papas from 1993 to 1998 with original members John Phillips and Denny Doherty.

Brescia has played the role of "Amneris" in Elton John and Tim Rice's Aida in several productions. Brescia joined the first national touring production in 2002 as the standby for Kelli Fournier. She assumed the role of Amneris in September 2002 when Fournier left the production. Disney later moved her to the Broadway production as the standby for Mandy Gonzalez. Brescia assumed the role on January 4, 2004, upon Gonzalez's departure. She remained in the role until the musical's final performance on September 5, 2004. Brescia returned to the role for one week in 2006 at The Muny in St. Louis along with Simone and Will Chase, both of whom also appeared in the Broadway production.

On February 13, 2007, she assumed the role of standby for Elphaba in the Broadway production of Wicked, playing the role during the absence of Julia Murney and then Stephanie J. Block. She left the production on May 18, 2008, and transferred to the Chicago production from June 3, 2008, replacing Dee Roscioli in the lead role of Elphaba. She gave her final performance in Chicago on August 24, 2008, after which Roscioli returned to the role.

Brescia then starred in the Kennedy Center for the Performing Arts' Broadway: Three Generations, a three-act evening featuring condensed versions of Girl Crazy, Bye Bye Birdie, and Side Show. The show was presented at the Kennedy Center's Eisenhower Theater October 2–5, 2008.

She appeared in The Unauthorized Autobiography of Samantha Brown as Mom in The Orange County Performing Arts center, Orange County, California in 2009. The "work-in-progress" was written by Kait Kerrigan and Bree Lowdermilk.

She starred as Claire in the musical Ordinary Days, which was presented at the Black Blox Theatre in Manhattan from October 2 to December 13, 2009. She is featured on the Original Off-Broadway Cast Recording which was released in September 2010.

Brescia replaced Beth Leavel as Donna Sheridan in the Broadway production of Mamma Mia!. Her first performance took place on October 22, 2010. Her final performance took place on June 2, 2012.

On July 16, 2018, it was announced that Brescia would return to Broadway in Dear Evan Hansen as Heidi Hansen on August 7. She succeeded Rachel Bay Jones, who played her final performance on August 5. Brescia starred in the show until November 24, 2019, and was replaced by Jessica Phillips.

Brescia is currently teaching for the Musical Theatre Department of Missouri State University.

== Personal life ==
Her husband is actor Craig Carnelia.

== Theatre roles ==
=== Broadway ===
Source: PlaybillVault

- Dear Evan Hansen (2018–19) as Heidi Hansen
- Mamma Mia! (2010–12) as Donna Sheridan
- Wicked (2007–08) as Standby for Elphaba
- The Times They Are a-Changin' (2006) as Cleo
- The Woman in White (2005) as Marian Halcombe
- Aida (2004) as Amneris
- Jesus Christ Superstar (2000) as Disciple

=== Off-Broadway ===
- Ordinary Days (2009) as Claire

=== Chicago ===
- Wicked (2008) as Elphaba

=== Touring ===
- Aida (2002) as Amneris

=== Regional ===
- Mary Poppins (2016) as Winifred Banks (Raleigh, NC)
- A Comedy of Tenors (2015) as Tatiana (Cleveland, OH)
- Victor/Victoria (2015) as Victoria Grant/Count Victor Grazinski (Ogunquit, ME)
- Into the Woods (2014) as Witch (Chapel Hill, NC)
- Cabaret (2013) as Sally Bowles (Chapel Hill, NC, PlayMakers Repertory Company)
- August: Osage County (2012) as Ivy Weston (Raleigh, NC, Theatre Raleigh)
- Hamlet (2012) as Gertrude (Notre Dame, IN)
- The Unauthorised Autobiography of Samantha Brown (2009) as Mom (Orange County, CA)
- Aida (2006) as Amneris (St Louis, MO, The Muny)
- Evita (2005) as Eva Perón (Bellport, NY, Gateway Playhouse)
- The Last Five Years (2005) as Cathy (Milwaukee, WI, Skylight Opera Theater)
- Actor, Lawyer, and Indian Chief (2002) as Jenny (Chester, CT, Goodspeed Musicals)
- A Little Night Music (2001) as Petra (East Haddam, CT, Goodspeed Musicals)
- Brigadoon (2001) as Meg (East Haddam, CT, Goodspeed Musicals)
