= Triassic Parq =

Musical comedy

Triassic Parq is a musical comedy with music by Marshall Pailet, and lyrics and book by Marshall Pailet, Bryce Norbitz and Steve Wargo.

== Synopsis ==
The novel and film Jurassic Park told from the perspective of the dinosaurs. A clan of genetically engineered female dinosaurs (played by male and female actors) is thrown into chaos when one of the female dinosaurs spontaneously turns male. Originally directed by Marshall Pailet and presented Off-Broadway at the Soho Playhouse in 2012. The original cast featured Alex Wyse (Velociraptor of Innocence), Wade McCollum (Velociraptor of Faith), Lindsay Nicole Chambers (Velociraptor of Science), Shelley Thomas (T-Rex 1), Claire Neumann (T-Rex 2), Brandon Espinoza (Mime-a-saurus), Lee Seymour (Morgan Freeman) and Zak Sandler (Pianosaurus).

== Production history ==
Originally produced in 2010 at the NY International Fringe Festival under the title Jurassic Parq: The Broadway Musical" where it won "Best Overall Musical/Production." After Off-Broadway, it was slightly re-written and presented at the Chance Theater in Orange County where it won the Ovation Award for "Best Production of a Musical (Intimate Theater)" in addition to two other awards.

== Cast ==
| | NY International Fringe Festival | Off-Broadway | Chance Theater |
| Character | 2010 | 2012 | 2013 |
|---|---|---|---|
| Velociraptor of Innocence | N/A | Alex Wyse | Keaton Williams |
| Velociraptor of Faith | John Jeffrey Martin | Wade McCollum | Jackson Tobiska |
| Velociraptor of Science | Mary Ellen Ashley | Lindsay Nicole Chambers | Camryn Zelinger |
| Baby Velociraptor | Brandon Gill | N/A | N/A |
| T-Rex 1 | Tara Novie | Shelley Thomas | Micaela Martinez |
| T-Rex 2 | Natalie Bradshaw / Claire Neumann | Claire Neumann | Kellie Spill |
| Dilophosaurus | Jay Frisby | N/A | N/A |
| Mime-a-saurus | Brandon Espinoza | Brandon Espinoza | Alex Bueno |
| Morgan Freeman | Lee Seymour | Lee Seymour | Camryn Zelinger |
| Chorusasaurus | Denise Dumper, Olli Haaskivi, Emily Jenda, Cara Massey | N/A | N/A |
| Pianosaurus | N/A | Zak Sandler | Taylor Stephenson |
| Percuss-a-don | N/A | Jeremy Yaddaw | N/A |

== Recordings ==
Original cast recording

Original Release Date: 2012

Label: Starkadia

Music: Marshall Pailet

Lyrics: Marshall Pailet, Bryce Norbitz and Steve Wargo

Director: Marshall Pailet

Music Director: Zak Sandler

- Alex Wyse – Velociraptor of Innocence
- Wade McCollum – Velociraptor of Faith
- Lindsay Nicole Chambers – Velociraptor of Science
- Shelley Thomas – T-Rex 1
- Claire Neumann – T-Rex 2
- Brandon Espinoza – Mime-a-saurus
- Lee Seymour - Morgan Freeman
- Zak Sandler - Pianosaurus
