= David A. Adler =

American writer (born 1947)

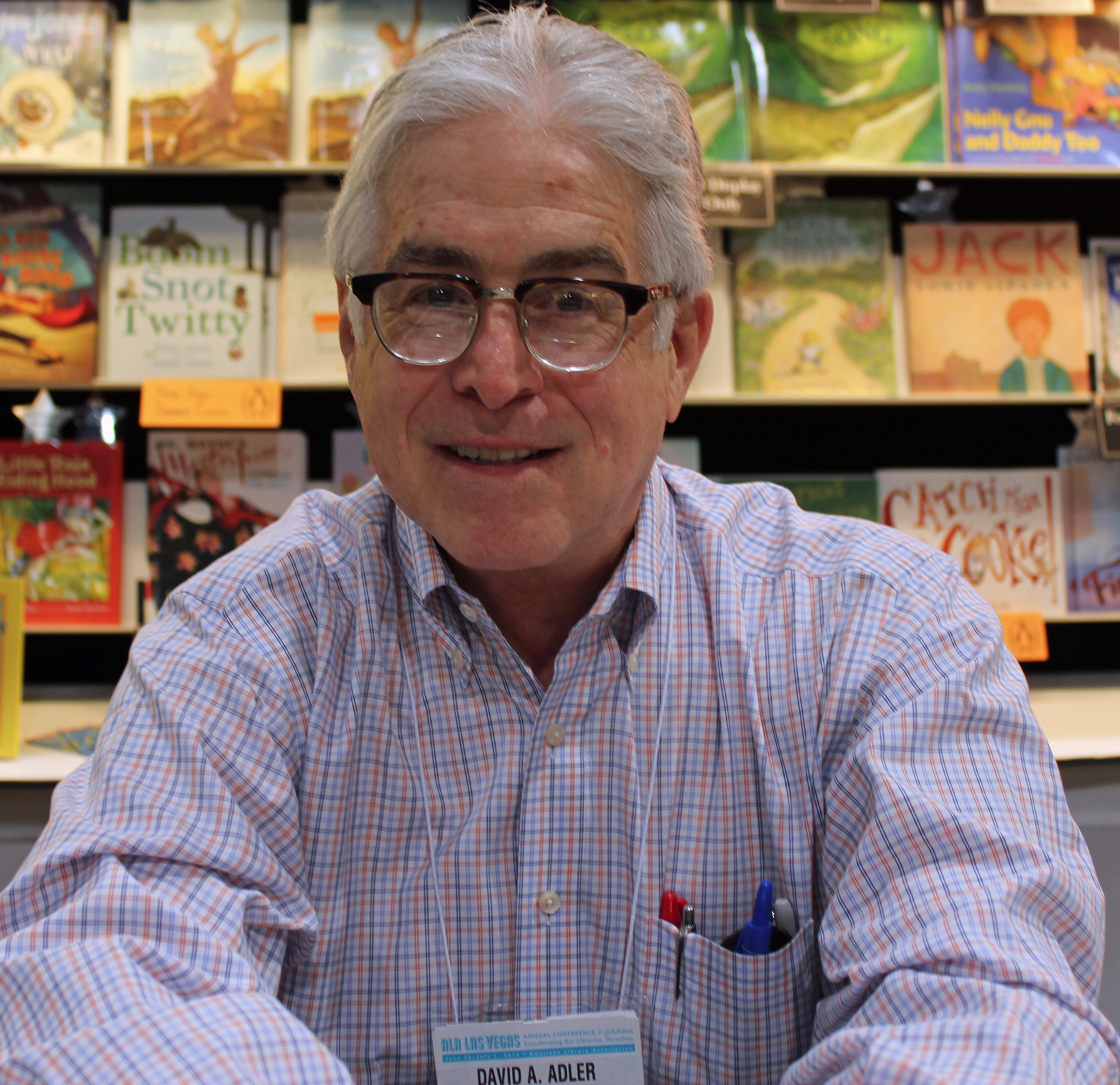
- Born: David Abraham Adler; April 10, 1947 (age 79); New York City, New York
- Occupation: Writer
- Writing career
- Genres: Children's fiction, especially mystery; picture books, especially biography
- Notable work: Cam Jansen mystery series

David Abraham Adler (born April 10, 1947) is an American writer of 265 books for children and young adults, most notably the Cam Jansen mystery series, the Picture Book Of... series, and several acclaimed works about the Holocaust for young readers.

== Biography ==
Adler was born in New York to a Jewish family. He graduated from Queens College in 1968 with a bachelor's degree in economics and education. He worked as a mathematics teacher for the New York City Board of Education, while taking classes towards a master's degree in marketing, a degree he was awarded by New York University in 1971. In that same year, a question from his then-three-year-old nephew inspired Adler to write his first story, A Little at a Time, subsequently published by Random House in 1976. Adler's next project, a series of math books, drew on his experience as a math teacher. In 1977, he created his most famous character, Cam Jansen, originally featured in Cam Jansen and the Mystery of the Stolen Diamonds, which was first published in 1980 and is still in print along with more than 50 other Cam Jansen Mysteries. Worldwide, more than 30,000,000 books have been printed and sold.

Adler married psychologist Renee Hamada in 1973, and their first child, Michael, was born in 1977. By that time Adler had taken a break from teaching and, while his wife continued her work, he stayed home, took care of Michael, and began a full-time writing career.

Adler's son, Michael S. Adler, is now the co-author of several books with his father, including A Picture Book of Sam Adams, A Picture Book of John Hancock, and A Picture Book of James and Dolly Madison. Another son, Edward, was the inspiration for Adler's Andy Russell series, with the events described in the series loosely based on adventures the Adler family had with Edward's enthusiasm and his pets.

Adler has won many awards including the Theodor Seuss Geisel award for the 2015 book Don't Throw It To Mo! (together with illustrator Sam Ricks), the Knickerbocker Award for his body of work, the 2017 Regina Medal for his body of work from the Catholic Library Association, the California Young Readers' Medal for his book "The Babe and I," The 2006 Storytelling World Award for "Joe Louis: America's Fighter," the 2006 Children's Gallery Award for "Mama Played Baseball," The Boston Globe-Horn Book Honor for "Lou Gehrig: The Luckiest Man," and The Sydney Taylor ALJ Award for "The Number on My Grandfather's Arm." Regina Award in 2017 and the Orthodox Jewish All-Star Award also in 2017.

As of September 2016, Adler has three sons and five grandsons. He lives in Woodmere, New York.

== Books ==
=== Cam Jansen mystery series ===
Cam Jansen is a series of books following the exploits of a fifth-grade female detective named Jennifer "Cam" Jansen and her best friend Eric. Nicknamed Cam for her photographic memory, the protagonist closes her eyes and says "click" at various points in a story, mimicking the noise of a camera while memorizing a scene in front of her. She later recalls these scenes to aid in solving a mystery. The Cam Jansen character was based on an elementary school classmate of Adler's who was believed to have a photographic memory.

A stage musical based on the character Cam Jansen and novels was produced by Theatreworks USA Off-Broadway in 2004. The musical has music by Laurence O'Keefe and lyrics and a book by Nell Benjamin.

- Cam Jansen and the Mystery of the Stolen Diamonds (1980)
- Cam Jansen and the Mystery of the UFO (1980)
- Cam Jansen and the Mystery of the Dinosaur Bones (1981)
- Cam Jansen and the Mystery of the Television Dog (1981)
- Cam Jansen and the Mystery of the Gold Coins (1982)
- Cam Jansen and the Mystery of the Babe Ruth Baseball (1982)
- Cam Jansen and the Mystery of the Circus Clown (1983)
- Cam Jansen and the Mystery of the Monster Movie (1984)
- Cam Jansen and the Mystery of the Carnival Prize (1984)
- Cam Jansen and the Mystery at the Monkey House (1985)
- Cam Jansen and the Mystery of the Stolen Corn Popper (1986)
- Cam Jansen and the Mystery of Flight 54 (1989)
- Cam Jansen and the Mystery at the Haunted House (1992)
- The Cam Jansen Fun Book (1992)
- Cam Jansen and the Chocolate Fudge Mystery (1993)
- Cam Jansen and the Triceratops Pops Mystery (1995)
- Cam Jansen and the Ghostly Mystery (1996)
- Cam Jansen and the Scary Snake Mystery (1997)
- Cam Jansen and the Catnapping Mystery (1998)
- Cam Jansen and the Barking Treasure Mystery (1999)
- Cam Jansen and the Birthday Mystery (2000)
- Cam Jansen and the School Play Mystery (2001)
- Cam Jansen and the First Day of School Mystery (2002)
- Cam Jansen and the Tennis Trophy Mystery (2003)
- Cam Jansen and the Snowy Day Mystery (2004)
- Cam Jansen and the Valentine Baby Mystery (2005) - 25th Anniversary Special
- Cam Jansen and the Secret Service Mystery (2006)
- Cam Jansen and the Mystery Writer Mystery (2007)
- Cam Jansen and the Summer Camp Mysteries (2007) - three stories
- Cam Jansen and the Green School Mystery (2008)
- Cam Jansen and the Sports Day Mysteries (2009) - three stories
- Cam Jansen and the Basketball Mystery (2009)
- Cam Jansen and the Wedding Cake Mystery (2010)
- Cam Jansen and the Graduation Day Mystery (2011)
- Cam Jansen and the Millionaire Mystery (2012)
- Cam Jansen and the Spaghetti Max Mystery (2013)
- Cam Jansen and the Joke House Mystery (2014)

=== Young Cam Jansen series ===
- Young Cam Jansen and the Chocolate Chip Mystery / Young Cam Jansen and the Missing Cookie (1996)
- Young Cam Jansen and the Dinosaur Count Mystery / Young Cam Jansen and the Dinosaur Game (1996)
- Young Cam Jansen and the Lost Tooth (1997)
- Young Cam Jansen and the Ice Skate Mystery (1998)
- Young Cam Jansen and the Baseball Mystery (1999)
- Young Cam Jansen and the Pizza Shop Mystery (2000)
- Young Cam Jansen and the Library Mystery (2001)
- Young Cam Jansen and the Double Beach Mystery (2002)
- Young Cam Jansen and the Zoo Note Mystery (2003)
- Young Cam Jansen and the New Girl Mystery (2004)
- Young Cam Jansen and the Substitute Mystery (2005)
- Young Cam Jansen and the Spotted Cat Mystery (2006)
- Young Cam Jansen and Lion's Lunch Mystery (2007)
- Young Cam Jansen and the Molly Shoe Mystery (2008)
- Young Cam Jansen and the 100th Day of School Mystery (2009)
- Young Cam Jansen and the Speedy Car Mystery (2010)
- Young Cam Jansen and the Circus Mystery (2011)
- Young Cam Jansen and the Magic Bird Mystery (2012)
- Young Cam Jansen and the Goldfish Mystery (2013)
- Young Cam Jansen and the Knock, Knock Mystery (2014)

=== Holocaust books for young readers ===
- The Number on My Grandfather's Arm (1987)
- We Remember the Holocaust (1989)
- A Picture Book of Anne Frank (1993)
- Hilde and Eli: Children of the Holocaust (1994)
- One Yellow Daffodil: A Hanukkah Story (1995)
- Child of the Warsaw Ghetto (1995)
- Hiding from the Nazis (1997)
- A Hero and the Holocaust: The Story of Janusz Korczak and His Children (2003)

=== Bones mystery series ===
- Bones and the Big Yellow Mystery (2004)
- Bones and the Dog Gone Mystery (2004)
- Bones and the Cupcake Mystery (2005)
- Bones and the Dinosaur Mystery (2005)
- Bones and the Birthday Mystery (2007)
- Bones and the Math Test Mystery (2008)
- Bones and the Roller Coaster Mystery (2009)
- Bones and the Clown Mix-Up Mystery (2010)
- Bones and the Football Mystery (2012)

=== Andy Russell series ===
- The Many Troubles of Andy Russell (1998)
- Andy and Tamika (1999)
- School Trouble for Andy Russell (1999)
- Parachuting Hamsters and Andy Russell (2000)
- Andy Russell, Not Wanted By the Police (2001)
- It's a Baby, Andy Russell (2005)

=== Biographies (including the "Picture Book of ...") ===
- Our Golda: The Story of Golda Meir (1984)
- Martin Luther King Jr.: Free at Last (1986)
- Thomas Jefferson: Father of our Democracy (1987)
- Jackie Robinson: He Was the First (1989)
- A Picture Book of Abraham Lincoln (1989)
- A Picture Book of George Washington (1989)
- A Picture Book of Martin Luther King, Jr. (1989)
- A Picture Book of Benjamin Franklin (1990)
- A Picture Book of Thomas Jefferson (1990)
- A Picture Book of Helen Keller (1990)
- Thomas Alva Edison: Great Inventor (1990)
- Christopher Columbus: Great Explorer (1991)
- A Picture Book of Eleanor Roosevelt (1991)
- A Picture Book of Christopher Columbus (1991)
- A Picture Book of John F. Kennedy (1991)
- Benjamin Franklin: Inventor, Statesman, Printer (1992)
- A Picture Book of Harriet Tubman (1992)
- A Picture Book of Simon Bolivar (1992)
- A Picture Book of Florence Nightingale (1992)
- A Picture Book of Jesse Owens (1992)
- A Picture Book of Frederick Douglass (1993)
- A Picture Book of Rosa Parks (1993)
- A Picture Book of Sitting Bull (1993)
- A Picture Book of Robert E. Lee (1994)
- A Picture Book of Sojourner Truth (1994)
- A Picture Book of Jackie Robinson (1994)
- A Picture Book of Paul Revere (1995)
- A Picture Book of Patrick Henry (1995)
- A Picture Book of Davy Crockett (1996)
- A Picture Book of Thomas Edison (1996)
- A Picture Book of Louis Braille (1997)
- A Picture Book of Thurgood Marshall (1997)
- Lou Gehrig: The Luckiest Man (1997)
- George Washington: Father of our Country (1998)
- A Picture Book of Amelia Earhart (1998)
- A Picture Book of George Washington Carver (1999)
- My Writing Day (1999) (autobiography)
- A Picture Book of Sacajawea (1999)
- America's Champion Swimmer: Gertrude Ederle (2000)
- Martin Luther King, Jr. (2001)
- B. Franklin, Printer (2001)
- A Picture Book of Dwight David Eisenhower (2002)
- A Picture Book of Lewis and Clark (2003)
- A Picture Book of Harriet Beecher Stowe (2003)
- Helen Keller (2003)
- George Washington: An Illustrated Biography (2004)
- Heroes of the Revolution (2004)
- Enemies of Slavery (2004)
- President George Washington (2005)
- A Picture Book of Sam Adams (2005) (with Michael S. Adler)
- A Picture Book of John Hancock (2005) (with Michael S. Adler)
- Joe Louis: America's Fighter (2005)
- Campy, the Story of Roy Campanella (2006)
- Satchel Paige: Don't Look Back (2006)
- A Picture Book of James and Dolly Madison (2006) (with Michael S. Adler)

=== Other series ===
- The Fourth Floor Twins series
- A Houdini Club Mystery series
- Jeffrey's Ghost series
- Jelly Eli Z. series
- Mo Jackson series
- My Dog mystery series
- T.F. Benson mystery series

=== Other ===
- The House on the Roof (1976)
- The Children of Chelm (1979)
- You Think It's Fun to be a Clown (1980)
- Bunny Rabbit Rebus (1983)
- Eaton Stanley and the Mind Control Experiment (1985)
- Benny, Benny, Baseball Nut (1987)
- I Know I'm a Witch (1988)
- Malka's Secret Recipe: A Hanukkah Story (1989)
- Happy Hanukkah Rebus (1989)
- Happy Thanksgiving Rebus (1991)
- Chanukkah in Chelm (1997)
- Brothers in Egypt (1998)
- The Babe and I (1999)
- Mama Played Baseball (2003)
- It's Time to Sleep, It's Time to Dream (2007)
- Don't Talk to Me About the War (2008)
- Danny's Doodles: The Jelly Bean Experiment (2013)
