= Kalita Nature Reserve =

Protected area in Estonia

- Location within Estonia
- Location: Estonia
- Coordinates: 58°04′N 24°51′E
- Area: 146 ha (360 acres)
- Established: 2007

Kalita Nature Reserve is a nature reserve which is located in Pärnu County, Estonia.

The area of the nature reserve is 146 ha.

The protected area was founded in 2007 to protect valuable habitat types and threatened species in Kalita village (former Saarde Parish).
