= Asmeret Ghebremichael =

American actress and singer

- Education: New York University
- Occupations: Actress, singer
- Years active: 1999–present

Asmeret Ghebremichael is an American actress, director, and singer, known for her work in The Notebook, Submissions Only, and The Book of Mormon.

== Early life and education ==
Ghebremichael grew up in Churchill, Pennsylvania, with her parents and younger sister. As a child, she trained in dance and musical theatre at the Abby Lee Dance Company and was taught by Abby Lee Miller. Ghebremichael attended Woodland Hills High School and earned a B.S. in communications from New York University.

== Career ==
Ghebremichael made her Broadway debut in 1999, playing Rusty, Wendy Jo, Urleen, and the Ensemble (varying) in Footloose. She later appeared in the ensembles of Wicked and Spamalot (she also played the minstrel) on Broadway, as well as Lone Star Love and In the Heights (for which she won a Drama Desk Award) off-Broadway. In 2007, she played Pilar in Legally Blonde on Broadway. The show was filmed for TV, and in 2008 she began also understudying the roles of Shandi and Brooke Wyndham.

Ghebremichael also appeared on the reality competition show Legally Blonde: The Musical – The Search for Elle Woods twice. The show closed in 2008, and after appearing in the film Confessions of a Shopaholic, she began playing Raina Pearl in the web series Submissions Only. She also played Shawanda in the original Broadway cast of Elf: The Musical.

In 2011 she appeared in the ensemble of The Book of Mormon on Broadway. She later played Nabulungi on Broadway, and in the show's West End production, which she started in February 2016. In 2015, she appeared as a munchkin in The Wiz Live! on NBC. In 2017 she joined the West End cast of Dreamgirls as Lorrell Robinson.

== Theatre credits ==
Year	Show	Role	Notes
1999	Footloose	Rusty/Wendy Jo/Urleen (u/s) (replacement)	Broadway, Feb 14 – August 25, 1999
2004	Lone Star Love	Ensemble	off-Broadway
Unknown	Wicked	Ensemble (replacement)	Broadway
Unknown	Spamalot	Minstrel (replacement)	Broadway
2007	In the Heights	Ensemble	off-Broadway
2007	Legally Blonde	Pilar/Shandi/Brooke Wyndham (u/s)	Broadway, July 2, 2007 – October 19, 2008
2010	Elf	Shawanda	Broadway, November 14, 2010 – January 2, 2011
2011	The Book of Mormon	Assistant Dance Captain/Nabulungi (u/s)	Broadway, March 24, 2011 – November 25, 2012
2013	The Book of Mormon	Nabulungi	Broadway, Aug 6 – December 1, 2013
2015	The Book of Mormon	Nabulungi	West End, Nov. 2015–2016
2016	Sweet Charity	Nickie	Off-Broadway, November 2, 2016 - January 8, 2017
2017	Dreamgirls	Lorrell Robinson	West End, March 23, 2017 - January 12, 2019
2024	The Notebook	Associate Director	Broadway
2025	Two Strangers (Carry a Cake Across New York)	Associate Director/Associate Choreographer	Broadway

== Television ==
Year	Title	Role	Notes
2007	Legally Blonde: The Musical	Pilar	Filmed stage production
2008	Legally Blonde: The Musical – The Search for Elle Woods	Self	2 episodes
2010–14	Submissions Only	Raina Pearl	14 episodes
2014	Los Feliz, 90027	Self	unaired pilot
2015	Trevor Moore: High in Church	Singer	TV movie
2015	The Adventures of Lillian Kate	Alexi	3 episodes
2015	The Wiz Live!	Munchkin	TV movie
2022	WeCrashed	Renee	

== Film ==
Year	Title	Role	Notes
2008	The Drummer	Ivy	Short
2009	Confessions of a Shopaholic	Alette Receptionist	
2009	Red Hook	Asmeret	
2014	Russian Broadway Shut Down	Lesbian	Short
2015	Sad Studs	Blood Donor	Short

== Discography ==
Year	Title	Notes
2010	Elf (Original Broadway Cast Recording)	Featured vocals

== Awards and nominations ==
Year	Award	Category	Nominee	Result
2007	Drama Desk Award	Outstanding Ensemble Performance	In the Heights	Won
2017	Lucille Lortel Awards	Outstanding Featured Actress in a Musical	Sweet Charity	Nominated
2017	Chita Rivera Awards	Outstanding Outstanding Female Dancer in an Off-Broadway Show	Sweet Charity	Nominated
