= Kalita Humphreys =

American actress

Kalita V. H. Humphreys (March 6, 1914 – September 19, 1954) was an American actress who was most active in repertory theatre.

== Early years ==
Humphreys was the daughter of Robert Wade Humphreys and Geraldine Camilla Hardin Davis. Her father was a native of Cincinnati, Ohio; her mother was from an old and distinguished East Texas family. Humphreys grew up in Galveston, Texas and attended Ball High School.

She graduated from Vassar College, where she portrayed Cleopatra in Antony and Cleopatra.

== Career ==
Humphreys was a prominent actress in Galveston Little Theater productions, and acted in the Dallas Little Theatre.

Humphreys's first professional summer stock theater experience came at the Westchester Playhouse in New York, where she worked with Henry Fonda, Myron McCormick, Mildred Natwick, and Margaret Sullavan, among others. She was active in productions of the Barter Theatre in Abingdon, Virginia, having leading roles with co-stars including Gregory Peck and Charles Korvin. Other venues in which she performed included Bridgehampton Theatre, Old Town Theatre, and Sayville Playhouse.

Humphreys's Broadway debut had her playing a Swedish girl in Everywhere I Roam (1938). She also performed in Let's Face It! (1941) on Broadway. Shortly before her death she appeared in a 10-week run of Affairs of State in the Alley Theatre in Houston.

In other professional activities, Humphreys served as director of the Federal Theatre Project in Dallas and was a member of the Barter Theatre's board of directors. She also was a volunteer speaker for the American National Theater and Academy, with a focus on Texas theaters and both directed and acted with the Valley Players, a little theatre group in Liberty, Texas.

== Personal life ==
Humphreys was married to Joe K. Burson. They lived in Liberty, Texas, where he managed the estate that she inherited from her father.

== Death ==
On September 19, 1954, Humphreys and Burson were killed when the small plane in which they were riding crashed at the base of Pinnacle Mountain, near Lenhartsville, Pennsylvania. She was 38. They were on their way to a month's vacation in New York.

== Legacy ==
In 1959, Humphreys's mother donated $100,000 to the building fund of the Dallas Theater Center. In return, a new Frank Lloyd Wright-designed theater unit was named the Kalita Humphreys Theater. By July 1963, the theater had a company of 14 actors and presented nearly 250 performances annually.
