= Alex Wyse =

American actor

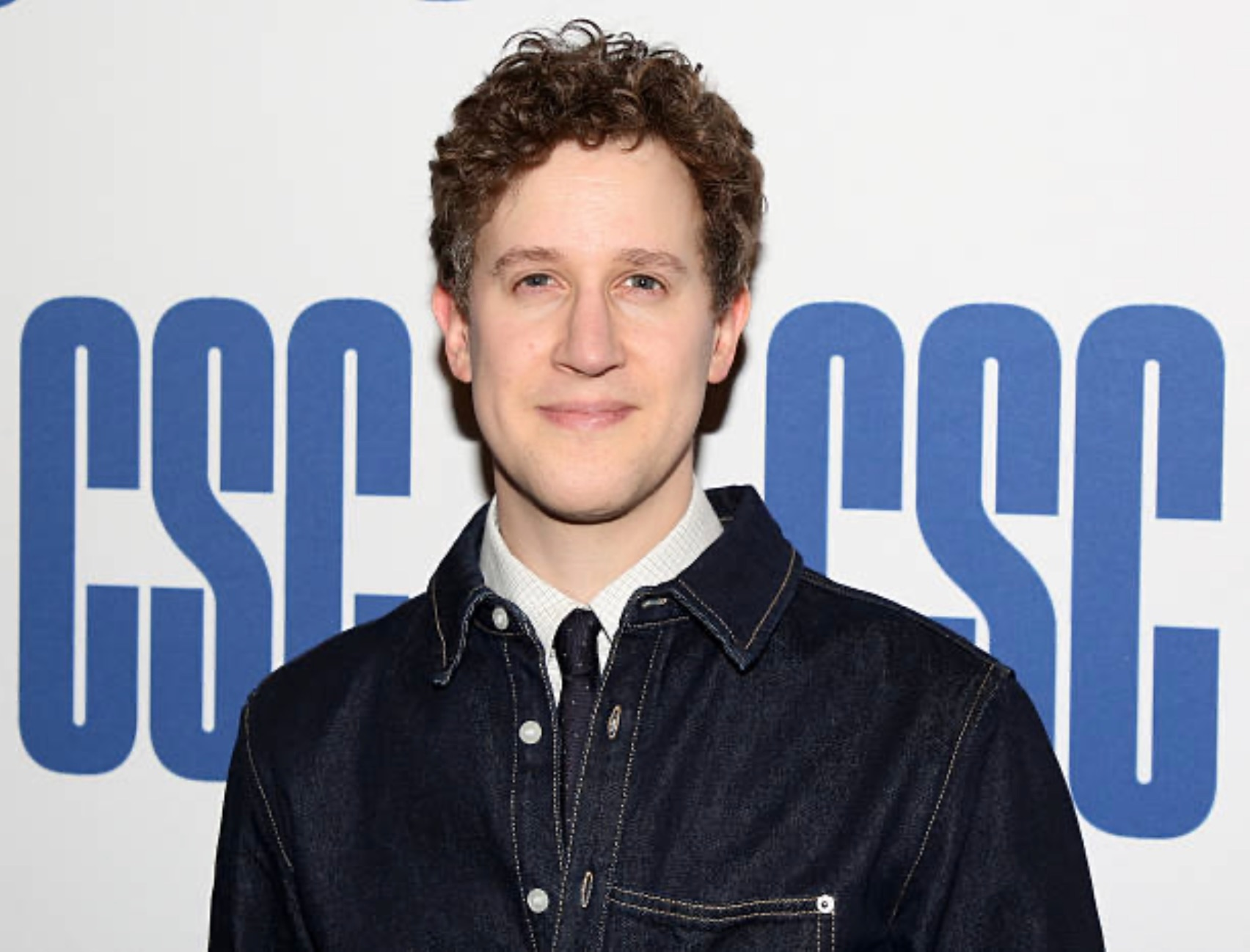
- Wyse in 2026
- Education: Beachwood High School
- Alma mater: Boston University
- Years active: 2009–present
- Known for: Spring Awakening; The Bold and the Beautiful; Good Night, Oscar; Lysistrata Jones; Indoor Boys

Alex Wyse is an American stage and screen actor, writer, director, and producer. He is best known for playing Kyle in Marvel's Iron Fist, Saul Feinberg in The Bold and the Beautiful, Max Weinbaum in the Broadway production of Good Night, Oscar, Georg Zirschnitz in the 2015 Deaf West Broadway revival of Spring Awakening, Ricky Potts in Ride the Cyclone, and co-writing/directing the feature film Summoning Sylvia.

== Early life ==
Wyse grew up in Cleveland, Ohio where he graduated from Beachwood High School. He later graduated from Boston University with a degree in theatre.

== Career ==
On television, Wyse has appeared in multiple roles since 2010 including Elsbeth, The Marvelous Mrs. Maisel, The Other Two, Bored to Death, Switched at Birth, The Bold and the Beautiful, Marvel's Iron Fist, NCIS: Los Angeles, and Masters of Sex.

On Broadway, he made his debut in Lysistrata Jones, which ran at the Walter Kerr Theatre from 2011 to 2012. He then played schoolboy Georg Zirschnitz in the Deaf West Theatre's production of Spring Awakening, and in 2018, he joined the musical Waitress, as Ogie. In 2023, Wyse played Max Weinbaum in the Tony-winning Broadway production of Doug Wright's Good Night, Oscar at the Belasco Theatre opposite Sean Hayes. He also co-produced the Broadway transfer of Heidi Schreck's play What the Constitution Means to Me, which opened at the Helen Hayes Theater on March 31, 2019. He received nominations for a Tony, Drama Desk, and Outer Critics Circle Award for acting as part of the producing team.

Off-Broadway, he has been seen in Lysistrata Jones, Triassic Parq, Bare, and Ride the Cyclone. In 2013–2014, he toured with the national company of Wicked, playing the role of Boq. In 2015, he appeared opposite Evan Rachel Wood and Rumer Willis in For the Record in Los Angeles.

As a writer and director, he co-wrote and directed the critically acclaimed and GLAAD nominated feature film Summoning Sylvia released in 2023. He also co-created, wrote, directed, edited, and starred in the digital series Indoor Boys, which was nominated for a Daytime Emmy Award and thirty-three Indie Series Awards, winning twelve, including Best Comedy, Comedy Writing, Comedy Directing, and Best Lead Actor for Wyse, before being acquired by Here TV. In 2024, he co-directed Cellino v. Barnes, which played off-Broadway at Asylum NYC from July 2024 through March 2025 . He wrote and directed the upcoming feature film Actual Nobodies starring Didi Conn, slated for release in 2026.

Wyse's other work includes co-writing the book, lyrics, and music for A Commercial Jingle For Regina Comet, which played off-Broadway at the Daryl Roth Theater in 2021. And in December 2023, Wyse starred in the solo musical "Picking Up Speed" off-Broadway at Royal Family Productions, for which he wrote the book, music, and lyrics.

Wyse has also participated in multiple workshops and readings, including the role of Jimmy in The Last Smoker in America in 2009 at the New York Musical Theatre Festival. In May 2014, he read the role of Jared Kleinman for the first reading of Dear Evan Hansen.

== Work ==
=== Theatre ===
Year	Production	Role	Venue	Ref.
2009	Speech & Debate	Solomon	The Lyric Stage Company of Boston	
2009–10	Lost in Yonkers	Jay	Maltz Jupiter Theatre	
2009–10	Lost in Yonkers	Jay	Cleveland Play House	
2009–10	Lost in Yonkers	Jay	Paper Mill Playhouse	
2010	Nighttime Traffic	Book, music and lyrics	Urban Stages Theater, Off Broadway	
2010–11	Academy	Benji	International tour	
2011	Lysistrata Jones	Cinesias	Judson Memorial Church, Off-Broadway	
2011–12	Lysistrata Jones	Cinesias	Walter Kerr Theatre, Broadway	
2012	Triassic Parq	Velociraptor of Innocence	SoHo Playhouse, Off-Broadway	
2012–13	Bare: The Musical	Alan, u/s Peter	New World Stages, Off-Broadway	
2013–14	Wicked	Boq	US Tour	
2015	For the Record: Dear John Hughes	The Geek	DBA Hollywood	
2015	Spring Awakening	Georg Zirschnitz	Wallis Annenberg Center, Los Angeles	
2015–16	Spring Awakening	Georg Zirschnitz	Brooks Atkinson Theatre, Broadway	
2016	Ride the Cyclone	Ricky Potts	Lucille Lortel Theatre	
2017	The Boy in the Bathroom	David	Charles R. Wood Theater	
2018	Waitress	Ogie Anhorn	Brooks Atkinson Theatre, Broadway	
2019	What the Constitution Means to Me	Co-producer	Helen Hayes Theater, Broadway	
2019	The Flamingo Kid	Hawk	Hartford Stage	
2021	A Commercial Jingle for Regina Comet	Other Man, (Note: Also created book, music, and lyrics) music, book, lyrics	Daryl Roth Theatre	
2023	Good Night, Oscar	Max Weinbaum	Belasco Theatre, Broadway	
2023	Picking Up Speed	Himself (Note: Also created book, music and lyrics)	Royal Family Arts Space	
2024	13: In Concert	The Rabbi	Lawrence Woodmere Academy, Concert	
2024	Cellino v. Barnes	—N/a	Asylum NYC (Note: Co-director with Wesley Taylor)	
2025	Practice	Danny	Playwrights Horizons	
2026	Marcel on the Train	Henri	Classic Stage Company	
2026	The 25th Annual Putnam County Spelling Bee	Leaf Coneybear	Cape Playhouse	
2026	The (Disaster) Marathon of 1904	Pheidippides	New World Stages	

=== Television ===
Year	Title	Role	Notes	Ref.
2010	What Would You Do?	Son	Episode: "Son Comes Out, Mom Balks"	
2010–11	Bored to Death	Steven	4 episodes	
2013	Nikki & Sara Live	Intern #1	Episode: "Season 1, Episode 10"	
2014	It Could Be Worse	George	Episode: "Cake"	
2014	Masters of Sex	Elliot	3 episodes	
2014	Bad Judge	Bobby	Episode: "Judge and Jury"	
2014	A to Z	Jordan	Episode: "H is for Hostile Takeover"	
2015	Modern Family	Sales Associate	Episode: "The Big Guns"	
2015	Switched at Birth	Howie	2 episodes	
2015	Agent X	Harold Hellman	Episode: "Truth, Lies and Consequences"	
2017–18	The Bold and the Beautiful	Saul Feinberg	Recurring role; 66 episodes	
2017–19	Indoor Boys	Nate	Lead role, also co-creator with Wesley Taylor	
2017	Marvel's Iron Fist	Kyle	4 episodes	
2017	NCIS: Los Angeles	Simon Atwater	Episode: "Can I Get A Witness?"	
2018	Only Children	Cooper		
2020	Broadway Whodunit: A Very Hanukkah Whodunit	Jacob	Live over Zoom	
2021	The Other Two	Elliott	Episode: "Pat Becomes #1 in Daytime"	
2023	The Marvelous Mrs. Maisel	Jerome	Episode: "Susan"	
2024	Elsbeth	Cooper	2 episodes	

=== Film ===
Year	Title	Role	Notes	Ref.
2014	X/Y	Sam		
2017	Dating My Mother	Mark		
2023	Summoning Sylvia	—N/a	Co-writer and co-director	
2025	Stop to Stop	Marc		
2026	Actual Nobodies		Writer and Director	

== Discography ==
=== Cast recordings ===
- 2012: Lysistrata Jones (Original Broadway Cast Recording)
- 2012: Triassic Parq: The Musical
- 2019: Academy the Musical
- 2022: A Commercial Jingle for Regina Comet (Original Cast Recording)
- 2024: Picking up Speed (World Premiere Recording)

=== Other recordings ===
- 2013: "Right Here" from I Could Use a Drink: The Songs of Drew Gasparini
- 2018: "Liquid Courage" from B Is for Beer: The Musical
- 2024: "Standing Tall" by Micah Young
