= Ordinary Days =

2008 musical by Adam Gwon

- Original Off-Broadway Cast Recording
- Music: Adam Gwon
- Lyrics: Adam Gwon
- Productions: 2008 Off-West End; 2009 Off-Broadway; 2011 Off-West End; 2012 Australia; 2015 Paris; 2015 Barcelona; 2015 Amsterdam; 2016 Israel; 2016 Rio de Janeiro; 2016 Scotland; 2016 Wellington; 2017 Off-West End; 2018 Buenos Aires; 2019 Off-Broadway; 2019 Off-West End; 2020 Hamilton; 2020 Madrid; 2021 Worcester; 2022 Lisbon; 2023 Jakarta; 2024 Israel; 2026 Ostrava

Ordinary Days is a sung-through musical with music and lyrics by American composer Adam Gwon. Set in New York City, the musical follows four characters, Claire, Jason, Warren, and Deb, exploring how their ordinary lives connect in the most amazing ways. Originally directed by Marc Bruni with the Roundabout Theatre Company at the Harold and Miriam Steinberg Center for Theatre, the show includes 21 songs which tell the story of these two men and two women. The original cast included Lisa Brescia (Claire), Hunter Foster (Jason), Jared Gertner (Warren), and Kate Wetherhead (Deb).

== Summary ==
Warren is an artist in New York City. He is employed by an artist who painted "pithy sayings" all across the city. This led to the artist getting arrested, and the artist hired Warren to watch his cat while he's in jail. Warren intends to spread the artist's vision by making flyers with the sayings instead. Although people are not interested in his work, he remains very ambitious, declaring that one day "This whole entire city's gonna look at me" ("One by One by One"). Deb is a graduate student also in New York. She had grown up in the countryside, and found her ambitions constantly limited by her circumstances. As a result, she moved to New York for grad school ("Don't Wanna Be Here"). Meanwhile, Jason is moving in with his girlfriend Claire so there is less space between them ("The Space Between"). To do this, he has to rearrange the furniture as well as throw out old mementos, which Claire has trouble letting go of ("Let Things Go").

In grad school, Deb is working on a thesis on Virginia Woolf. One day, she discovers that her notes are not in her bag where she kept them. Distressed, she imagines writing to her supervisor Professor Thompson asking for an extension, knowing full well that Professor Thompson had warned that he will never grant extensions ("Dear Professor Thompson (Pt. 1)"). Meanwhile, Warren explains his collection of trinkets that he found on the streets, which grants him a view of other people's life stories. He finds Deb's notes, and discovers an email address and a name ("Life Story"). Deb is composing ever more frantic emails to Professor Thompson ("Dear Professor Thompson (Pt. 2)") when Warren contacts her. Claire and Jason are fighting over the limited space in Claire's apartment. They reminiscence over an old article with the "Top ten things to do in New York before you leave it". They had worked through all ten things during their relationship. Although Claire still thinks about her past, Jason suggests an eleventh item ("I'm Trying").

Warren suggests that he return Deb's notes at the Metropolitan Museum of Art, under a painting by Claude Monet. Deb is flustered because the museum is difficult to navigate and she has trouble finding the painting. Jason suggests visiting the museum as the 11th item, but Claire does not enjoy the same types of paintings that he does. Jason enjoys realism, while Claire enjoys "wacky-er things" ("Saturday at the Met"). Jason realizes the trip to the museum did not work out well, but resolves to try to get through to Claire anyway, because Claire's heart is one of his favorite places ("Favorite Places"). Warren finds Deb and gives her back her notes, explaining that he had read the notes and drawn a detailed mental picture of the occasion. Deb is annoyed because she considers Warren a weirdo, but controls herself and offers to treat Warren to coffee ("Sort of Fairy Tale").

Jason and Claire are shopping for a bottle of wine for a party by Claire's cousin. They disagree over what wine to get, then argue further when the taxi to the party gets stuck in a traffic jam, and when they get out to walk, it starts to rain. Claire starts worrying about her hair, shoe, bag and dress, and how they are going to be late, but Jason can only think about how beautiful the rain makes Claire look. Abruptly, he proposes to Claire ("Fine").

Deb tries to have a serious conversation over coffee with Warren about their future plans, but Warren takes the conversation lightly. Deb is annoyed, and leaves abruptly when she realizes she needs to see Professor Thompson. At the same time, Claire, flustered by the proposal, also leaves Jason ("Big Picture"). Jason is confused and wonders what he should do next, as Claire and Deb force their way through the New York city crowds, realizing that these other people all had their own stories but right now were in the way ("Hundred Story City"). Claire makes it to her cousin's party without Jason, then realizes she's been crying ("Party Interlude"). Deb tries to calm herself, but when Professor Thompson criticizes her thesis, she panics and gets on a train to Jersey. After wandering aimlessly while trying to be calm, she returns to her apartment and sees a poster on her wall which reminds her of the painting by Monet she had seen with Warren. Suddenly, she realizes she is genuinely calm ("Calm"). Warren is pondering an answer to Deb's question when Deb contacts him ("Life Story (Reprise)").

Claire leaves her cousin's party and tries to sort out her feelings. She realizes she wants Jason happy, but has also been trying to keep space between them ("Gotta Get Out"). Deb visits Warren, who takes her to the roof of the building. They discuss their ambitions in life and how they hope for something more. Warren acknowledges that nobody reads the flyers he makes, and throws them over the edge. Seeing this, Deb also throws her thesis off the edge. Jason had decided he could not stay with Claire, and had packed his belongings to leave. As the shower of flyers rains down, Jason finds one that says "Don't worry, everything will be OK". Claire also sees the shower, and calls Jason on his mobile phone ("Rooftop Duet / Falling"). She reminisces about her previous relationship with a man named John. They had been married for about a year before he perished in the September 11 attacks. She hears John say it's OK for her to move on, and accepts Jason's proposal ("I'll Be Here").

In the finale, Deb and Warren have become good friends. They visit the Metropolitan Museum of Art again, together. Warren shows Deb his favorite painting, who cynically points out that it's a painting of very ordinary apples when they are in a museum with much grander works of art. Warren says that things are not intrinsically beautiful, but beauty comes from reflection, and something ordinary can nonetheless be "simple, familiar and full of feeling" ("Beautiful").

== Characters ==
=== Claire ===
Claire is in her 30s and is embarking on a new stage of her life with boyfriend Jason. The decision to share an apartment is the catalyst for Claire to face her past. Her cathartic "I'll Be Here" provides the audience the final clue to her arc.

Required vocal range: Soprano

=== Jason ===
Jason is in his 30s and is the boyfriend of Claire. A romantic at heart, he spends the bulk of the musical attempting to further his relationship, at first by moving in ("The Spaces Between") and then by proposing. Claire consistently resists his attempts leading to the central conflict of their story arc ("Fine").

Required vocal range: Tenor

=== Deb ===
In her mid twenties, Deb is a cynical and defensive grad student who is struggling to find focus in her life. She meets struggling artist Warren when he finds her thesis notes in the street.

Required vocal range: Mezzo

=== Warren ===
An artist in New York City. Employed to watch a cat while the owner is in jail.

Required vocal range: Tenor

== Musical numbers ==
- "One by One by One" – Warren and Company
- "Don't Wanna be Here" – Deb
- "The Space Between" – Jason
- "Let Things Go" – Claire
- "Dear Professor Thompson, Pt. 1" – Deb
- "Life Story" – Warren
- "Dear Professor Thompson, Pt. 2" – Deb
- "I'm Trying" – Claire and Jason
- "Saturday at the Met" – Company
- "Favorite Places" – Jason
- "Sort-Of Fairy Tale" – Warren and Deb
- "Fine" – Jason and Claire
- "Big Picture" – Warren and Deb
- "Hundred-Story City" – Jason and Company
- "Party Interlude" – Claire
- "Calm" – Deb
- "Life Story" (Reprise) – Warren
- "Gotta Get Out" – Claire
- "Rooftop Duet" / "Falling" – Company
- "I'll Be Here" – Claire
- "Beautiful" – Warren and Deb

There were two additional songs, written for Claire and Jason respectively, entitled "Canceling the Party" and "Seeing You There", which were cut from the production.

== Productions ==
In 2008, Ordinary Days had its world premiere at Penn State Center Stage as part of their 2008 summer season in State College, PA. Directed by Matt Toronto with Music Direction by Rick Bertone, the cast included Leah Horowitz, Stanley Bahorek, Jordan Toronto, and Jared Gertner.

In 2012 Squabbalogic and Darlinghurst Theatre premiered Ordinary Days, with Michael Falzon originating the role of Jason in Australia. Directed by Grace Barnes and under the musical direction of Paul Geddes, the show starred Rachael Beck as Claire, Erica Lovell as Deb, and Jay James-Moody as Warren. Ordinary Days was sung entirely acoustically, with the sole support of Paul Geddes on piano.

In 2015, Ordinary Days played La Comédie Nation in Paris, France, marking the musical's French premiere. Produced by Broadway au Carré, the show was directed by American director Colton Pometta with musical direction by John Florencio at the piano. The show starred Prisca Demarez as Claire, Emmanuel Suarez as Jason, Lauren Taylor Berkman as Deb, and Lisandro Nesis as Warren.

In 2017, Ordinary Days was performed at the Loft at Chapel Off Chapel. Produced by Pursued By Bear, the show was directed by Tyran Parke with musical direction from Stephanie Lewendon-Lowe at the piano. The cast included Brittanie Shipway as Claire, Matthew Hamilton as Jason, Nicola Bowman as Deb, and Joel Granger as Warren.

The amateur London Revival took place from 27 to 30 September at the Bridewell Theatre, Fleet Street. The show was produced by Sedos, with direction by Yojiro Ichikawa and musical direction from Ed Curry. It featured Kate Gledhill as Deb, Glen Jordan as Warren, Louisa Roberts as Claire, and Inti Conde as Jason.

In 2018, Ordinary Days played Teatro Border in Buenos Aires, Argentina, marking the musical's Argentine and Spanish language premiere, adapted by Marcos Micheloni. Produced by Mario Micheloni, the show was directed by American director Colton Pometta with musical direction by Mariano Homps and Rocco Aguado at the piano. The show starred Sofía Rangone as Claire, Argentino Molinuevo as Jason, Manuela del Campo and Maca Giraldez as Deb, and Lisandro Nesis and Michel Hersch as Warren.

The Off-Broadway Revival of Ordinary Days opened at the Clurman Theatre in Theatre Row in the fall of 2018. The show was directed by Jonathan Silverstein, with musical direction by John Bell. It was produced by Keen Company (Jonathan Silverstein, Artistic Director; Ashley DiGiorgi, Managing Producer). This production included new orchestrations created for Keen by Tony winner Bruce Coughlin (The Light in the Piazza). The show starred Whitney Bashor as Claire, Marc delaCruz as Jason, Sarah Lynn Marion as Deb, and Kyle Sherman as Warren. Scenic design was by Steven Kemp, costume design by Jennifer Paar, lighting design by Anshuman Bhatia, and sound design by Alex Hawthorn. The show was nominated for "Best Revival of a Musical" in the 85th Annual Drama League Awards, and the cast received positive reviews from publications including The New York Times, Times Square Chronicle, New York Theatre Guide, and The Gay City News.

London-based company Curious Tales Theatre staged an amateur revival of Ordinary Days at The Bread and Roses Theatre for 5–16 March 2019. Under the direction of Phoebe Rhodes and musical direction of Adam Parrish, the performance featured live painting by artists and performers Max Panks (Jason) and Kathryn Kitchener (Claire). The paintings (set at opposite ends of the stage), came together during "I'll Be Here" and became the focal point of the painting in "Beautiful".

The Irish premiere took place in the Smock Alley Theatre, Dublin, in September 2019. It was produced by Niall Gallagher and the Rising Theatre Company, directed by Andrea Basquille, and musically directed by David Wray.

Hamilton Theatre Project of Hamilton, Ontario, performed Ordinary Days to a sold-out audience at the Staircase Theatre on January 29, 2020. Directed by Luke Brown and with musical direction by Kate Boose, Ordinary Days was performed by a local quartet of performers that included Vicktoria Adam, Jeff Giles, Amber Mills, and Nick Settimi.

A professional production of Ordinary Days produced by Pickle Stage Productions was planned to tour the UK in February and March 2021, but the production transitioned to a filmed performance that will be streamed online from March 31 to April 6, 2021.

In November 2026, Ordinary Days will receive its Czech premiere and first professional production in the Czech Republic at the National Moravian-Silesian Theatre's Divadlo "12" in Ostrava. The production will be directed by Marek David, with musical direction by Marek Prášil, and will feature a Czech translation by Hana Nováková.

== Previous casts ==
Production	Year	Claire	Jason	Deb	Warren
Finborough	2008	Julie Atherton	Kenneth Avery-Clark	Hayley Gallivan	Lee William-Davis
Adirondack Theater Festival	2009	Amy Justman	Will Reynolds	Dana Steingold	Adam Armstrong
Black Box	2009	Lisa Brescia	Hunter Foster	Kate Wetherhead	Jared Gertner
Trafalgar Studio, 2	2011	Julie Atherton	Daniel Boys	Alexia Khadime	Lee William-Davis
Darlinghurst Theatre, Sydney	2012	Rachael Beck	Michael Falzon	Erica Lovell	Jay James-Moody
London Theatre Workshop	2014	Marcia Brown	Oliver Watton	Olga-Marie Pratt	Anton Tweedale
Comédie Nation, Paris	2015	Prisca Demarez	Emmanuel Suarez	Lauren Taylor Berkman	Lisandro Nesis
Versus Teatre, Barcelona	2015	Gracia Fernández / Maria Santalluisa	Víctor Gómez / Ferran Guiu	Lourdes Fabrés / Laura Daza	Xavi Duch / Albert Bolea
Theatre Studio, Amsterdam	2015	Julia Berendse	Stef van Gelder / Maarten Smeele	Patricia van Haastrecht	Wesley de Ridder
Cameri Theatre	2016	Naama Nahum	Shachaf Ifhar	Shani Shauli	Ben Naftali
Teatro Serrador, Rio de Janeiro	2016	Gabi Porto / Fernanda Gabriela	Hugo Bonemer / Mau Alves	Julia Morganti / Tecca Ferreira	Caio Loki / Victor Maia
Backyard Theatre, Wellington	2016	Laura Loach	Martin Tidy	Brigid Boyle	Michael Stebbings
London Theatre Workshop,	2017	Kirby Hughes	Alistair Frederick	Nora Perone	Neil Cameron
Pursued By Bear	2017	Brittanie Shipway	Matthew Hamilton	Nicola Bowman	Joel Granger
Amateur London Revival - Bridewell Theatre	2017	Louisa Roberts	Inti Conde	Kate Gledhill	Glen Jordan
Great Canadian Theatre Company	2017	Jennifer Cecil	Gab Desmond	Katie Ryerson	Zach Council
Soho Upstairs @ Soho Theatre	2018	Harriet Taylor	Guido Garcia Lueches	Wallis Hamilton Felton	Nir Kitaro
Teatro Border, Buenos Aires	2018	Sofía Rangone	Argentino Molinuevo	Manuela del Campo / Maca Giraldez	Lisandro Nesis / Michel Hersch
Keen Company, Off-Broadway	2018	Whitney Bashor	Marc delaCruz	Sarah Lynn Marion	Kyle Sherman
The Bread and Roses Theatre, London	2019	Kathryn Kitchener	Max Panks	Katie Forge	David Murray
Smock Alley, Dublin	2019	Roisin Sullivan	Sean Riddick	Julie Power	Niall Gallagher
Nuevo Teatro Alcalá, Madrid	2020	Marina Pastor	Victor Gómez / Nacho Brande	Laura Enrech	Oriol Burés
Top Note Arts, London - Virtual Production	2020	Laura Coard	Matt Concannon	Aimée Horwich	Oliver Jacobson
Pickle Stage Productions - Streamed Production	2021	Nic Myers	Will Arundell	Bobbie Chambers	Joe Thompson-Oubari
Cassidy Theatre - Parma Heights, OH	2021	Kelley Wheelock	Pat Miller	Rachael Armbruster	Zach Palumb
Starbuck Theatre Company - Malvern, Worcester	2021	Sarah Pavlov	Dean Bayliss	Ashleigh Aston	Nathan Blyth
Auditório Park IS, Lisbon	2022	Maria Prata	JP Costa	Sara Teixeira	João Cardoso
Center Stage Community, Jakarta	2023	Josephine Angelica	Raymundus Leonardo	Megan Patricia	Robertus Darren Radyan
Habima Theatre, Tel Aviv, Israel	2024	Ariel Dimant	Ofek Sasson / Eden Bitton	Adi Sharon / Adi Schor	Ahron Benafshi / Kfir Medenitzky
National Theatre Moravian-Silesian, Ostrava, Czech Republic	2026	Veronika Prášil Gidová / Pamela Soukupová	Adam Živnůstka / Radim Bierski	Tereza Dostalová / Veronika Bartošová	Jakub Bagin / Milan Bednář

== Recordings ==
Original cast recording (2010)

Released under the Ghostlight label.

- Lisa Brescia – Claire
- Hunter Foster – Jason
- Jared Gertner – Warren
- Kate Wetherhead – Deb

Miscellaneous Recordings

"I'll Be Here" is included on the album Go Back Home, by Audra McDonald, released in 2013. Liz Callaway has also recorded it, live at the Metropolitan Room 2015, and it appears on The Essential Liz Callaway CD.
