= Kalita Humphreys Theater =

Theater in Dallas, Texas

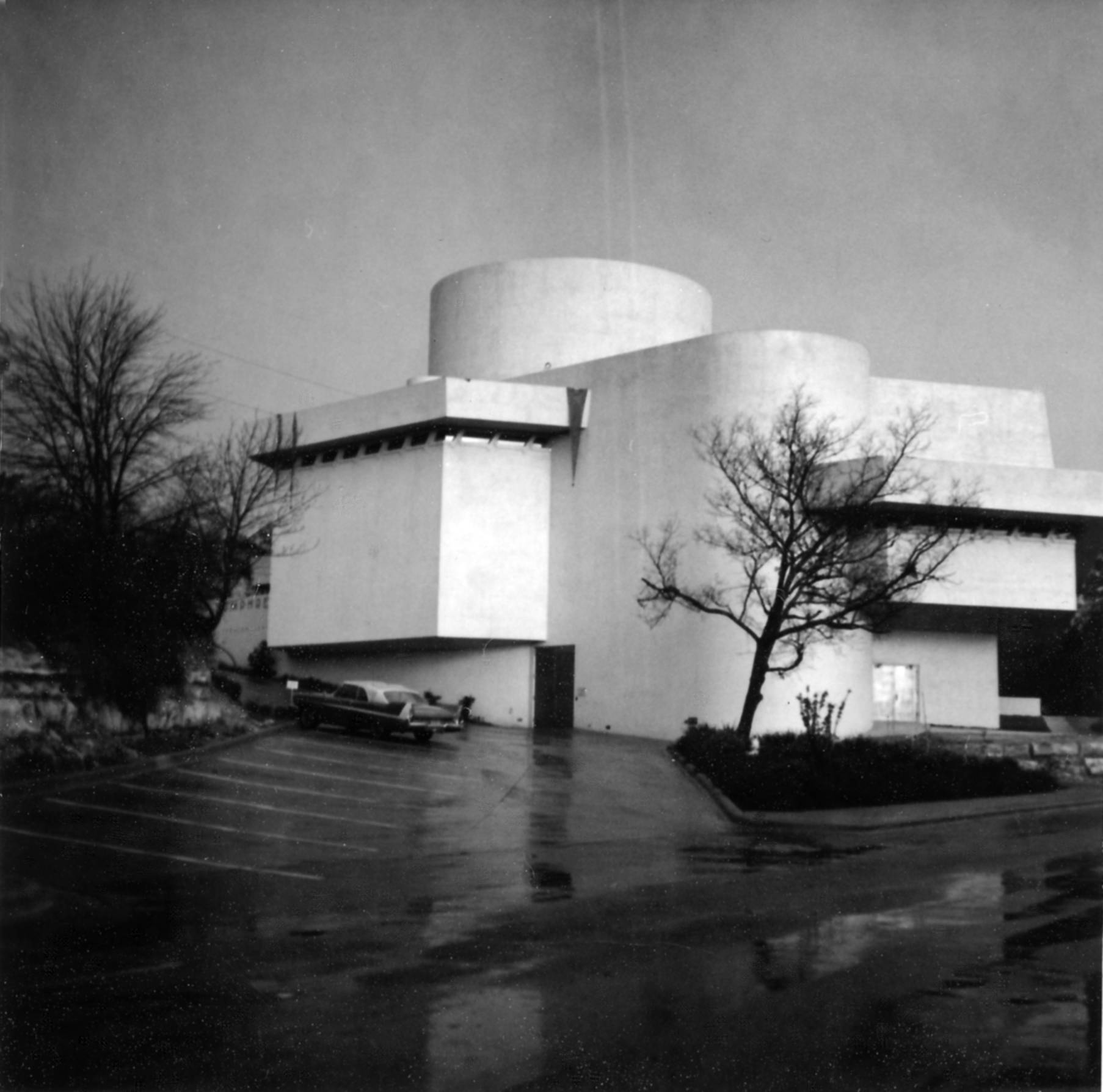
- Interactive map of Kalita Humphreys Theater
- Address: 3636 Turtle Creek Blvd; Dallas; United States
- Coordinates: 32.810815°N 96.800668°W
- Owner: City of Dallas
- Capacity: 440
- Designation: City of Dallas Historic Landmark Structure

Construction
- Opened: December 27, 1959
- Architect: Frank Lloyd Wright

Website
- www.dallastheatercenter.org

The Kalita Humphreys Theater is a historic theater in Dallas, Texas, United States. It is the only theater by architect Frank Lloyd Wright and one of the last completed buildings he designed. It was built in 1959 for Dallas Theater Center, which still produces original productions on the revolving stage.

== History ==
The Dallas Theater Center committee approached Frank Lloyd Wright to design a theater on land donated by Sylvan T. Baer along the picturesque Turtle Creek. Wright, busy at the time with other projects, suggested that if the committee could use a plan already in his files he would agree to the project. The original design had been created for a West Coast theater in 1915 and later adapted for Hartford, Connecticut. Neither of these theaters were built for various reasons and the design was adapted for Dallas.

Construction began in 1955 and was completed four years later and nine months after Wright's death at a cost of over $1,000,000. The Kalita Humphreys Theater opened on December 27, 1959, with a presentation of "Of Time and the River" by Thomas Wolfe. The theater took its name from an actress who worked with Paul Baker, the first director of the Dallas Theater Center. Kalita Humphreys died in a plane crash in 1954 and her parents donated $120,000 to the theater as a memorial. The theater was recognized as a historic city of Dallas landmark in 2007.

In 2009, Dallas Theater Center moved its administrative offices to the Dee and Charles Wyly Theatre at the AT&T Performing Arts Center in the Dallas Arts District, but continues to produce shows in both spaces and continues to manage the Kalita Humphreys Theater. In April 2018, Kalita Humphreys Theater hosted Dallas Theater Center's production of "The Trials of Sam Houston", a world-premiere play written by Aaron Loeb. The Kalita Humphreys Theater also remains in use as a regional theater space by other local performing arts groups. In 2010, Uptown Players, a growing gay-focused theater company moved to the Kalita Humphreys Theater and occupies the space when not being used by the Dallas Theater Center. In addition, Second Thought Theater performs at Bryant Hall, which adjoins the Kalita Humphreys Theater. Between productions and rehearsals by Dallas Theater Center and these other companies, Kalita Humphreys Theater remains in use as a working theater approximately 50 weeks of each year.

Other Dallas theater groups also use the Kalita Humphreys Theater throughout the year, including Uptown Players and Second Thought Theater.

== Architecture ==
The theater's design was considered bold and innovative. It was based on Frank Lloyd Wright's Organic architecture, which stressed the unification of the building's form and function, the harmony of the building's structure with its natural setting, and the aesthetically pleasing manipulation of space. Because Wright's design was based on nature, and everything in the theater is at a 30/60-degree angle, the only 90 degree angles in the theater are where the walls meet the ceiling and floor.

=== Main theater ===
During the design phase the proscenium was eliminated, thereby blending the stage and the auditorium into one unit. This created a more intimate relationship between the actors and the audience. The stage is able to be a revolving stage for some performances. Above the stage is the huge cantilevered 8-inch-thick (200 mm), 40-foot-high (12 m) concrete drum. Weighing 127 tons, Wright designed the drum to be counterbalanced by the corresponding weight and structure of the three-flight dressing room area behind the stage.

The original color of the walls and seats was sand. The rake of the seats was changed in 1983 to give the audience better sightlines and add additional seats. A row of windows runs along the back of the theater. Window coverings in Wright's design were later requested by Paul Baker because "theater was not just performed at night."

Originally, stage lights were housed in the ceiling but proved difficult to adjust, and today's lighting system was added later. Texas Instruments donated the first digital soundboard to be used in a theater.

=== The wings/backstage ===
Due to rising costs during the construction of the theater, the backstage area was reduced in size. The stage level contains two dressing rooms and the Green Room. The second level has additional dressing rooms.

=== Basement ===
Large circular ramps on either side of the stage led down to the basement, which was designed for the building of sets. The sets would be rolled up one ramp to the stage and then down the other ramp after use. Today only one ramp remains in use, and the basement is occasionally used as a black box theater.

=== Wyly Wing ===
The Wyly Wing, named for Charles and Dee Wyly, was added in 1969 as a separate building designed in the style of Wright. A porte cochere connected the two buildings. The space today includes the Lay Studio ("Frank's Place") and Wynne Studio, which serve as education rooms and performance spaces, plus a lounge, kitchen, waiting room and offices.

=== Lobby ===
The original lobby ended where today's center wall stands. In 1990 the lobby was expanded and Art Rodgers, a local architect, worked with the Frank Lloyd Wright Foundation to create new additions to the theater. Stairs next to the auditorium were straightened, a kitchen space was removed and a spiral staircase added to provide additional access to lower level restrooms, which were also enlarged. The porte cochere added in 1969 was enclosed to form additional lobby space needed. It also allowed for the addition of a gift shop and beverage bar, and a large opening was made to help the flow of patrons into the auditorium.

=== Stecker Library ===
Located off one side of the theater was the library and conference room, named for Mr. Robert D. Stecker, who was an original committee member and the dedicated President of the organization. The library granted graduate degrees in theater from Baylor University and later Trinity University. Today the library has been restored to its original appearance and is used for private functions.

=== Heldt Administration Building ===
Northwest of the Kalita Humphreys Theater is this more functional block built in 1990 and designed by Dallas architect Art Rogers. Original design called for it to be disguised entirely by trees so as not to interfere with Wright's design.

=== Building site ===
The building is built into a limestone bluff and cantilevered over the heavily wooded site overlooking Turtle Creek. The design is predominantly horizontal interrupted by the towering concrete drum. The entrance to the theater faces Southeast and original plans called for patrons parking on the other side of the elevated railroad tracks (now the Katy Trail). As one passed through a small pedestrian tunnel the grand theater entrance would be revealed. Wright repeats this process of experience throughout the theater in his creative design of the stairways, large terraces and fountains.

== See also ==
- List of Frank Lloyd Wright works

== Literature ==
- Storrer, William Allin (1993). The Frank Lloyd Wright Companion. Chicago: University of Chicago Press. ISBN 978-0-226-77624-8. (S.395)
