= Cam Jansen =

Series of children's mystery novels by David A. Adler

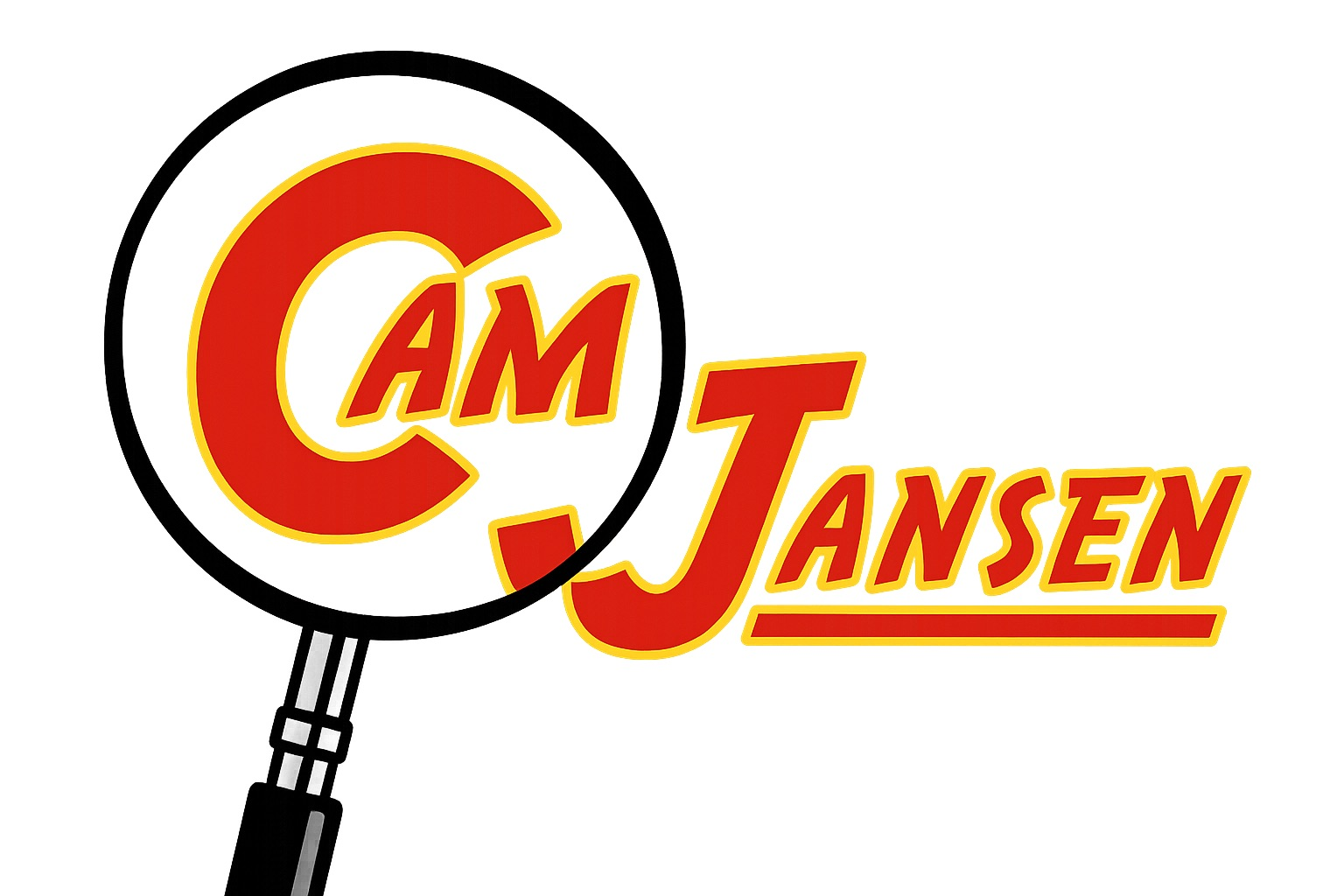
- Author: David A. Adler
- Cover artist: Joy Allen and Susanna Natti
- Country: United States
- Language: English
- Genre: Mystery fiction, children's literature
- Publisher: Penguin Random House, Scholastic Corporation
- Published: 1980 – 2014
- Media type: Print (hardback & paperback); Audiobook; E-book
- No. of books: 56

Cam Jansen, also known as Cam Jansen Mysteries, is a series of children’s mystery detective novels created by American author David A. Adler featuring fifth‑grader Jennifer “Cam” Jansen, a young sleuth with a photographic memory who uses mental “click” snapshots to solve cases with her friend Eric.

Since its initial publication in 1980, Cam Jansen and its spinoff series, Young Cam Jansen, have sold over 30 million copies worldwide and remained in print for over three decades. It is a New York Times Bestseller and has been translated into ten languages.

== Publication and series overview ==
The character of Cam Jansen originated from Adler’s experience as a math teacher and a real‑life classmate reputed to have a photographic memory.

Adler introduced Cam Jansen in his first title, Cam Jansen and the Mystery of the Stolen Diamonds, published in 1980. Aimed primarily at a middle grade audience and intended to be a gateway to mystery and detective fiction, the Cam Jansen series has grown to 56 titles, with 36 primary Cam Jansen books and 20 Young Cam Jansen early‑reader books.

It is credited as one the earliest examples of the 'transitional chapter book' genre for young readers. As Adler has stated in interviews, “In the 1970s, there were no transitional books — short, easy chapter books for early readers... Cam Jansen books are perfect for kids who are in between those two levels. In Cam Jansen, the writing is almost completely about the plot. That makes the story exciting without bogging the reader down.”

== Format and style ==
Each book centers on "Cam" Jansen, a fifth‑grade girl with a knack for detective work and a photographic memory, which earned her the nickname that was short for "camera." When Cam needs to remember something important, she blinks and says “click!” to mentally store an image. Later she recalls these visual details to unravel mysteries with the help of Eric and her other friends.

The tone is described as light and suitable for children and a middle grade audience. The Stories are fast‑paced, dialogue‑led, and often feature everyday settings such as schools, carnivals, and small‑town events, with few layers of dark themes as Cam and her friends uncover clues to solve crimes that no one else can.

=== Illustrators ===
Joy Allen and Susanna Natti have been among the primary illustrators for covers and interiors.

== Reception and legacy ==
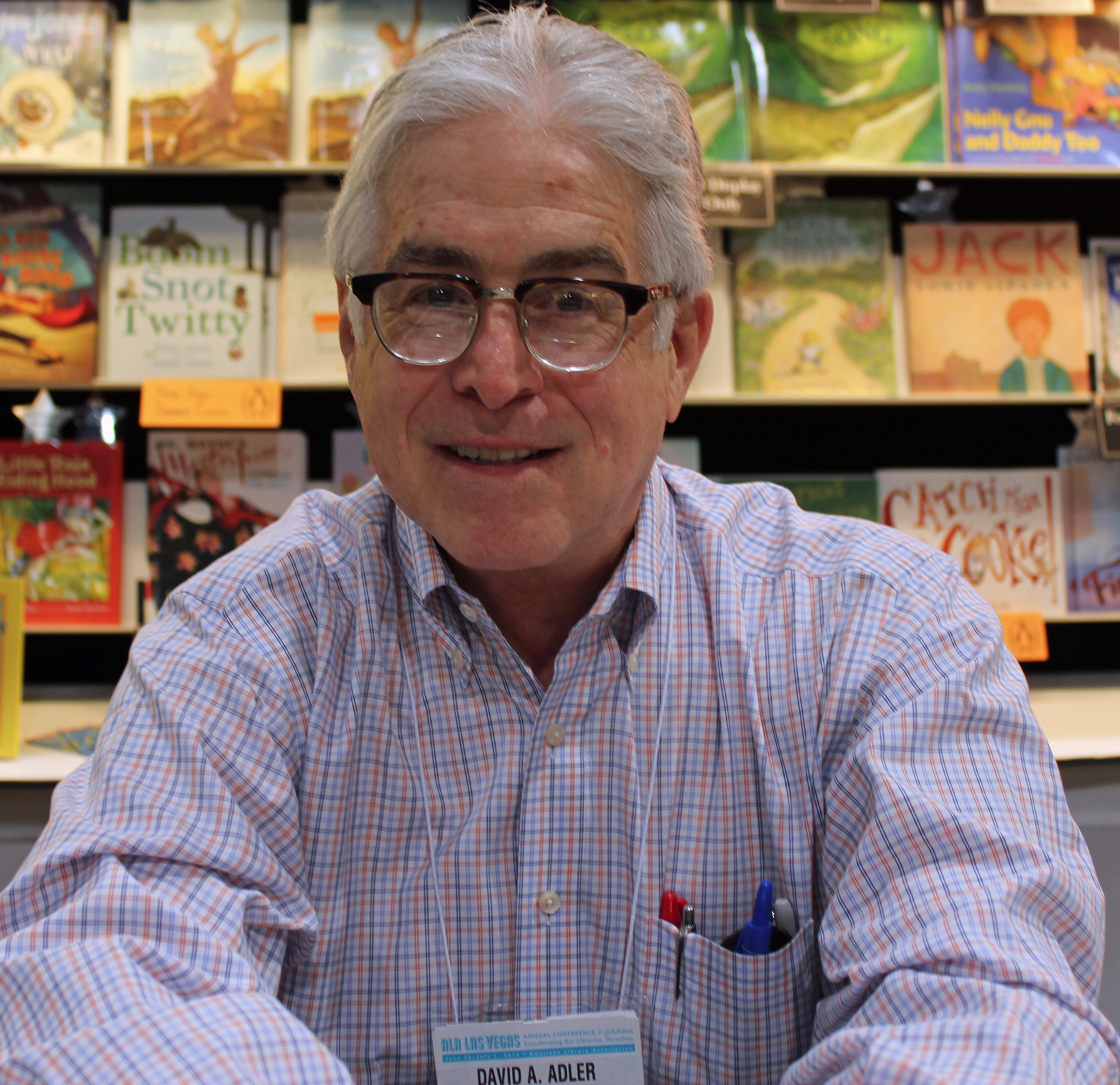
Author David A. Adler at a book signing for Cam Jansen.

The series has remained a bestseller for over three decades. It is widely praised for promoting logic, observation skills, and persistence in young readers. Readers often recall mimicking Cam’s “click!” gesture to remember something, a distinctive hallmark of the series.

In 2004, a stage musical adaptation of the character and stories premiered on Off-Broadway staged by Theatreworks USA, with music by Laurence O’Keefe and book/lyrics by Nell Benjamin. The story featured an original Cam Jansen mystery in which Jansen "teams up with her former rivals and her best friend to unravel the most mysterious case of all — the disappearance of the Emerald Elephant of Pajamastan."

On December 13, 2020, Cam Jansen was the answer in the New York Times Super Mega Crossword Puzzle. On March 3, 2023, Cam Jansen was the answer to a crossword puzzle in The Washington Post.

== International editions ==
Though primarily published in English, the series has been translated into numerous languages including Japanese, Swedish, Danish, Korean, Hungarian, German, Spanish, British English (UK editions), Dutch, and Hebrew.

== Book list ==
=== Cam Jansen Mysteries (main series) ===
- Cam Jansen and the Mystery of the Stolen Diamonds (1980)
- Cam Jansen and the Mystery of the U.F.O. (1980)
- Cam Jansen and the Mystery of the Dinosaur Bones (1981)
- Cam Jansen and the Mystery of the Television Dog (1981)
- Cam Jansen and the Mystery of the Gold Coins (1982)
- Cam Jansen and the Mystery of the Babe Ruth Baseball (1982)
- Cam Jansen and the Mystery of the Circus Clown (1983)
- Cam Jansen and the Mystery of the Monster Movie (1984)
- Cam Jansen and the Mystery of the Carnival Prize (1984)
- Cam Jansen and the Mystery at the Monkey House (1985)
- Cam Jansen and the Mystery of the Stolen Corn Popper (1986)
- Cam Jansen and the Mystery of Flight 54 (1989)
- Cam Jansen and the Mystery at the Haunted House (1992)
- The Cam Jansen Fun Book (1992)
- Cam Jansen and the Chocolate Fudge Mystery (1993)
- Cam Jansen and the Triceratops Pops Mystery (1995)
- Cam Jansen and the Ghostly Mystery (1996)
- Cam Jansen and the Scary Snake Mystery (1997)
- Cam Jansen and the Catnapping Mystery (1998)
- Cam Jansen and the Barking Treasure Mystery (1999)
- Cam Jansen and the Birthday Mystery (2000)
- Cam Jansen and the School Play Mystery (2001)
- Cam Jansen and the First Day of School Mystery (2002)
- Cam Jansen and the Tennis Trophy Mystery (2003)
- Cam Jansen and the Snowy Day Mystery (2004)
- Cam Jansen and the Valentine Baby Mystery (2005)
- Cam Jansen and the Secret Service Mystery (2006)
- Cam Jansen and the Mystery Writer Mystery (2007)
- Cam Jansen and the Green School Mystery (2008)
- Cam Jansen and the Basketball Mystery (2009)
- Cam Jansen and the Wedding Cake Mystery (2010)
- Cam Jansen and the Graduation Day Mystery (2011)
- Cam Jansen and the Millionaire Mystery (2012)
- Cam Jansen and the Spaghetti Max Mystery (2013)
- Cam Jansen and the Joke House Mystery (2014)

=== Young Cam Jansen (spin‑off series) ===
- Young Cam Jansen and the Chocolate Chip Mystery / Missing Cookie (1996)
- Young Cam Jansen and the Dinosaur Count Mystery / Dinosaur Game (1996)
- Young Cam Jansen and the Lost Tooth (1997)
- Young Cam Jansen and the Ice Skate Mystery (1998)
- Young Cam Jansen and the Baseball Mystery (1999)
- Young Cam Jansen and the Pizza Shop Mystery (2000)
- Young Cam Jansen and the Library Mystery (2001)
- Young Cam Jansen and the Double Beach Mystery (2002)
- Young Cam Jansen and the Zoo Note Mystery (2003)
- Young Cam Jansen and the New Girl Mystery (2004)
- Young Cam Jansen and the Substitute Mystery (2005)
- Young Cam Jansen and the Spotted Cat Mystery (2006)
- Young Cam Jansen and the Lion’s Lunch Mystery (2007)
- Young Cam Jansen and the Molly Shoe Mystery (2008)
- Young Cam Jansen and the 100th Day of School Mystery (2009)
- Young Cam Jansen and the Speedy Car Mystery (2010)
- Young Cam Jansen and the Circus Mystery (2011)
- Young Cam Jansen and the Magic Bird Mystery (2012)
- Young Cam Jansen and the Goldfish Mystery (2013)
- Young Cam Jansen and the Knock, Knock Mystery (2014)
