= Dallas Theater Center =

Major regional theater in Dallas, Texas

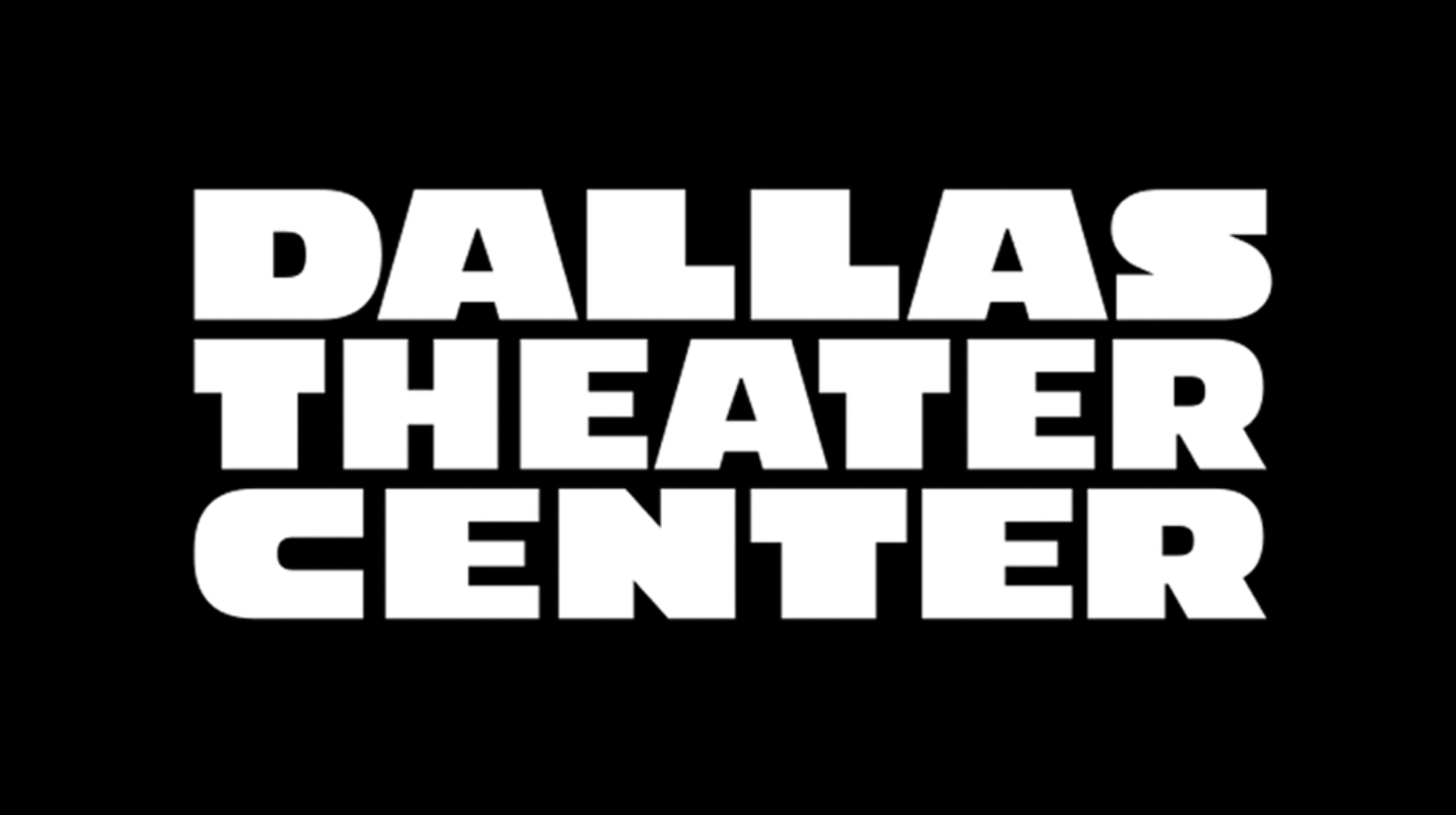
- Interactive map of Dallas Theater Center
- Address: 2400 Flora St; Dallas, Texas; United States
- Coordinates: 32°47′24″N 96°47′47″W

Construction
- Opened: 1959

Website
- www.dallastheatercenter.org

The Dallas Theater Center is a major regional theater in Dallas, Texas, United States. It produces classic, contemporary, and new plays and was the 2017 Tony Award recipient for Best Regional Theater.

Dallas Theater Center produces its original works at the Kalita Humphreys Theater, the Margot and Bill Winspear Opera House, and the Dee and Charles Wyly Theatre as part of the AT&T Performing Arts Center in the Dallas Arts District.

== History ==
Founded in 1959, Dallas Theater Center was one of the first regional theaters in the United States with Paul Baker at the helm and it also served as Baylor's graduate drama program. The Frank Lloyd Wright-designed Kalita Humphreys Theater was its first home. Under Adrian Hall's leadership, DTC became a professional theater company in 1983 and made their annual presentation of A Christmas Carol an official tradition. During Hall's tenure, the company launched Project Discovery, its educational arm, and began to program in the downtown Arts District Theater.

During Baker's tenure, Dallas Theater Center became one of the nation's leading producers of experimental interpretations of classics and world premieres, with 35 plays premiering on the Kalita Humphreys Theater stage during his time, including The Latent Heterosexual, Shadow of an Eagle, Blood Money, and Preston Jones' A Texas Trilogy. Other notable productions include DTC's Give it Up! which transferred to Broadway as Lysistrata Jones and Bella: An American Tall Tale which transferred to Playwrights Horizons.

Multiple productions at Dallas Theater Center have transferred to New York City's Public Theater, including The Good Negro in 2009, Giant in 2012, and The Fortress of Solitude in 2014.

In 2017, DTC was awarded the Regional Theatre Tony Award.
