= List of Glee characters =

Glee is a musical comedy-drama television series that aired on Fox in the United States for six seasons from 2009 to 2015. It focuses on the high school glee club New Directions competing in the show choir competition circuit, while its members deal with relationships, sexuality and social issues.

The initial main cast encompassed club director and Spanish (later History) teacher Will Schuester (Matthew Morrison), cheerleading coach Sue Sylvester (Jane Lynch), guidance counselor Emma Pillsbury (Jayma Mays), Will's wife Terri (Jessalyn Gilsig), and eight club members played by Dianna Agron, Chris Colfer, Kevin McHale, Lea Michele, Cory Monteith, Amber Riley, Mark Salling and Jenna Ushkowitz. For the second season, formerly recurring cast members Mike O'Malley, Heather Morris and Naya Rivera were promoted to the main cast. In the third season the main cast remained at fifteen, with Harry Shum Jr. and Darren Criss promoted to it, while Gilsig and O'Malley no longer received star billing. The fourth season began with fourteen in the main cast, with Chord Overstreet being promoted, and Mays and Agron were removed and demoted to recurring cast. The fifth season saw the biggest change, with Monteith's death, and Morris, Riley, Salling and Shum all being switched to recurring status. At the same time, Jacob Artist, Melissa Benoist, Blake Jenner, Alex Newell and Becca Tobin were promoted to the main cast and are credited as such for the season, though they appear only in the first thirteen of the twenty episodes, after which New Directions is disbanded and the series shifts to the glee club alumni in New York City for the remainder of the season. The sixth and final season's main cast was reduced to nine: Colfer, Criss, Lynch, McHale, Michele, Morrison and Overstreet continued from the previous season, Riley returned to the main cast, and Dot-Marie Jones as football coach Shannon (later Sheldon) Beiste was promoted to it.

The series has many supporting characters, including faculty members, students and relatives of the glee club members. Broadway stars including Idina Menzel, John Lloyd Young, Jonathan Groff, Phoebe Strole and Kristin Chenoweth have been featured in guest roles. A number of the principal actors were cast directly from Broadway, while those without theatrical backgrounds were required to demonstrate singing and dancing as well as acting ability.

== Casting ==
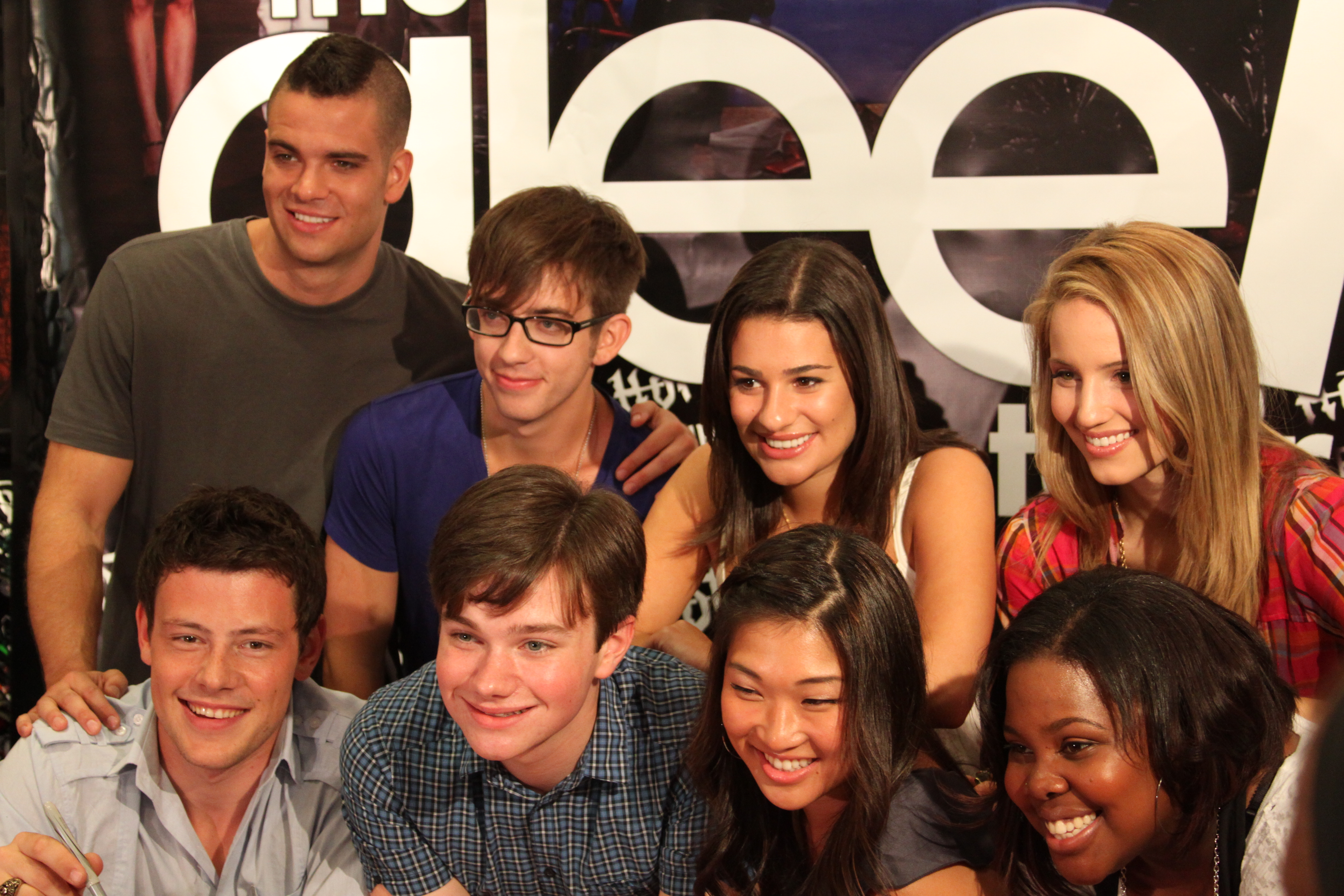
Original Glee cast members: (clockwise from back left) Mark Salling, Kevin McHale, Lea Michele, Dianna Agron, Amber Riley, Jenna Ushkowitz, Chris Colfer and Cory Monteith

In casting Glee, series creator Ryan Murphy sought actors who could identify with the rush of starring in theatrical roles. Instead of using traditional network casting calls, Murphy spent three months on Broadway, where he found Matthew Morrison (Will Schuester), who had previously starred on stage in Hairspray and The Light in the Piazza, Lea Michele (Rachel Berry), who starred in Spring Awakening, and Jenna Ushkowitz (Tina Cohen-Chang), from the Broadway revival of The King and I. The role of Rachel was written specifically for Michele.

Chris Colfer (Kurt Hummel) had originally auditioned to play Artie Abrams. Although Colfer had no previous professional experience, Murphy was so impressed by Colfer's performance that the role of Kurt Hummel, named after the character Kurt from The Sound of Music, was created for him.

Auditioning actors with no theatrical experience were required to demonstrate their ability to sing and dance. Jayma Mays (Emma Pillsbury) auditioned with the song "Touch-a, Touch-a, Touch-a, Touch Me" from The Rocky Horror Show, while Cory Monteith (Finn Hudson) initially submitted a tape of himself acting only, and was requested to submit a second, musical tape, in which he sang "a cheesy, '80s music-video-style version" of REO Speedwagon's "Can't Fight This Feeling". Cory Monteith has deemed his casting "spot on" as his lack of formal training is reflected in the abilities of his character, Finn Hudson.

Kevin McHale (Artie Abrams) came from a boy-band background, having previously been part of the group NLT. He auditioned with the song "Let It Be" and tested alongside Colfer and Ushkowitz. McHale explained that the diversity of the cast's backgrounds reflects the range of different musical styles within the show itself: "It's a mix of everything: classic rock, current stuff, R&B. Even the musical theater stuff is switched up. You won't always recognize it." Jane Lynch was originally intended to have a recurring role in the show, but became a series regular when a Damon Wayans pilot she was working on for ABC fell through.

Dianna Agron (Quinn Fabray) was the last primary actor to be cast, having won the role only days before the pilot began filming. Agron auditioned for Glee coming from a background in dancing and acting. Agron said in a 2009 interview pertaining to her casting session: "I nearly bailed on my audition for the show. I was so nervous". With her wholesome good looks, Agron certainly looked the part, but the producers wondered if she appeared too innocent. Agron said in an interview: "They told me to come back with straight hair and to dress sexier. Later that week, I started work." Agron auditioned with Frank Sinatra's "Fly Me to the Moon". The Glee producers said "we really lucked out in finding Agron to play Quinn".

== Table of cast members ==
List indicator

This section includes characters who will appear or have appeared in at least one season.

- A green cell indicates the actor is a main cast member.
- A red cell indicates the actor is a recurring cast member.
- A light blue cell indicates the actor is a guest or special guest cast member.

Actor / Actress	Character	Seasons					
Actor / Actress	Character	1	2	3	4	5	6
Main characters
Dianna Agron	Quinn Fabray	Main	Main	Main	Recurring	Recurring	Recurring
Chris Colfer	Kurt Hummel	Main	Main	Main	Main	Main	Main
Jessalyn Gilsig	Terri Schuester	Main	Main		Guest		Recurring
Jane Lynch	Sue Sylvester	Main	Main	Main	Main	Main	Main
Jayma Mays	Emma Pillsbury	Main	Main	Main	Recurring	Recurring	Recurring
Kevin McHale	Artie Abrams	Main	Main	Main	Main	Main	Main
Lea Michele	Rachel Berry	Main	Main	Main	Main	Main	Main
Cory Monteith	Finn Hudson	Main	Main	Main	Main		
Matthew Morrison	Will Schuester	Main	Main	Main	Main	Main	Main
Amber Riley	Mercedes Jones	Main	Main	Main	Main	Recurring	Main
Mark Salling	Noah Puckerman	Main	Main	Main	Main	Recurring	Recurring
Jenna Ushkowitz	Tina Cohen-Chang	Main	Main	Main	Main	Main	Recurring
Heather Morris	Brittany Pierce	Recurring	Main	Main	Main	Recurring	Recurring
Mike O'Malley	Burt Hummel	Recurring	Main	Recurring	Recurring	Recurring	Recurring
Naya Rivera	Santana Lopez	Recurring	Main	Main	Main	Main	Recurring
Darren Criss	Blaine Anderson		Recurring	Main	Main	Main	Main
Harry Shum Jr.	Mike Chang	Recurring	Recurring	Main	Main	Recurring	Recurring
Chord Overstreet	Sam Evans		Recurring	Recurring	Main	Main	Main
Jacob Artist	Jake Puckerman				Recurring	Main	Guest
Melissa Benoist	Marley Rose				Recurring	Main	
Blake Jenner	Ryder Lynn				Recurring	Main	Guest
Alex Newell	Unique Adams			Recurring	Recurring	Main	Recurring
Becca Tobin	Kitty Wilde				Recurring	Main	Recurring
Dot-Marie Jones	Sheldon Beiste		Recurring	Recurring	Recurring	Recurring	Main
Recurring and Guest Characters
Iqbal Theba	Principal Figgins	Recurring	Recurring	Recurring	Recurring	Recurring	Recurring
Lauren Potter	Becky Jackson	Recurring	Recurring	Recurring	Recurring	Recurring	Recurring
Brad Ellis	Brad	Recurring	Recurring	Recurring	Recurring	Recurring	Recurring
Josh Sussman	Jacob Ben Israel	Recurring	Recurring	Recurring	Recurring	Guest	
Romy Rosemont	Carole Hudson-Hummel	Recurring	Recurring	Recurring	Guest	Recurring	Recurring
Bill A. Jones	Rod Remington	Recurring	Recurring	Recurring	Guest	Recurring	Recurring
Earlene Davis	Andrea Carmichael	Recurring	Recurring	Recurring	Guest	Recurring	Guest
Ashley Fink	Lauren Zizes	Recurring	Recurring	Recurring	Guest		Guest
Max Adler	Dave Karofsky	Recurring	Recurring	Recurring		Guest	Recurring
Jonathan Groff	Jesse St. James	Recurring	Recurring	Recurring			Recurring
James Earl, III	Azimio	Recurring	Recurring	Guest			
Charlotte Ross	Judy Fabray	Recurring	Guest	Guest			
Kent Avenido	Howard Bamboo	Recurring	Guest				Guest
Robin Trocki	Jean Sylvester	Recurring	Recurring				
Kristin Chenoweth	April Rhodes	Recurring	Guest			Recurring	
Stephen Tobolowsky	Sandy Ryerson	Recurring	Guest				
Idina Menzel	Shelby Corcoran	Recurring		Recurring	Guest		
Dijon Talton	Matt Rutherford	Recurring					Recurring
Patrick Gallagher	Ken Tanaka	Recurring					
Jennifer Aspen	Kendra Giardi	Recurring					
Josh Groban	Himself	Recurring					
Eve	Grace Hitchens	Recurring					
Olivia Newton-John	Herself	Recurring					
Neil Patrick Harris	Bryan Ryan	Guest					
Ryan Heinke	Brett Bukowski		Recurring	Guest	Recurring	Recurring	
Gwyneth Paltrow	Holly Holliday		Recurring			Recurring	
Jake Zyrus	Sunshine Corazón		Recurring				
Cheyenne Jackson	Dustin Goolsby		Recurring				
John Stamos	Dr. Carl Howell		Recurring				
Carol Burnett	Doris Sylvester		Guest				Guest
Britney Spears	Herself		Guest				
Patti LuPone	Herself		Guest				
Barry Bostwick	Tim Stanwick		Guest				
Meat Loaf	Barry Jeffries		Guest				
Katie Couric	Herself		Guest				
Vanessa Lengies	Sugar Motta			Recurring	Recurring		Recurring
NeNe Leakes	Roz Washington			Recurring	Recurring	Recurring	Guest
Whoopi Goldberg	Carmen Tibideaux			Recurring	Recurring	Guest	
Grant Gustin	Sebastian Smythe			Recurring	Recurring	Guest	
Samuel Larsen	Joe Hart			Recurring	Recurring		Recurring
Damian McGinty	Rory Flanagan			Recurring	Guest		
LaMarcus Tinker	Shane Tinsley			Recurring			
Lindsay Pearce	Harmony			Recurring			
Keong Sim	Mike Chang Sr.			Recurring			
Tamlyn Tomita	Julia Chang			Recurring			
Jeff Goldblum	Hiram Berry			Recurring			
Brian Stokes Mitchell	Leroy Berry			Recurring			Guest
Gloria Estefan	Maribel Lopez			Guest			Guest
Ivonne Coll	Alma Lopez			Guest			Recurring
Matt Bomer	Cooper Anderson			Guest			
Ricky Martin	David Martinez			Guest			
Lindsay Lohan	Herself			Guest			
Perez Hilton	Himself			Guest			
Rex Lee	Martin Fong			Guest			
Kate Hudson	Cassandra July				Recurring		
Dean Geyer	Brody Weston				Recurring		
Sarah Jessica Parker	Isabelle Wright				Recurring		
Oliver Kieran-Jones	Adam Crawford				Recurring		
Nolan Gerard Funk	Hunter Clarington				Recurring		
Trisha Rae Stahl	Millie Rose				Recurring	Guest	
Pamela Chan	Dottie Kazatori				Recurring	Recurring	
Katey Sagal	Nancy Abrams				Guest		
Jessica Sanchez	Frida Romero				Guest		
Ali Stroker	Betty Pillsbury				Guest		
Christopher Cousins	Superintendent Harris					Recurring	Recurring
Demi Lovato	Dani					Recurring	
Erinn Westbrook	Bree					Recurring	
Adam Lambert	Elliot "Starchild" Gilbert					Recurring	
Shirley MacLaine	June Dolloway					Recurring	
Peter Facinelli	Rupert Campion					Recurring	
Ioan Gruffudd	Paolo San Pablo					Recurring	
Tyra Banks	Bichette					Guest	
June Squibb	Maggie Banks					Guest	
Tim Conway	Marty Rogers					Guest	
Billy Dee Williams	Andy Collins					Guest	
Chace Crawford	Biff McIntosh					Guest	
Skylar Astin	Jean Baptiste					Guest	
Noah Guthrie	Roderick Meeks						Recurring
Laura Dreyfuss	Madison McCarthy						Recurring
Billy Lewis Jr.	Mason McCarthy						Recurring
Samantha Marie Ware	Jane Hayward						Recurring
Marshall Williams	Spencer Porter						Recurring
Josie Totah	Myron Muskovitz						Recurring
Finneas O'Connell	Alistair						Recurring
Myko Olivier	Skylar						Recurring
Max George	Clint						Recurring
Jennifer Coolidge	Whitney Pierce						Recurring
Ken Jeong	Pierce Pierce						Recurring
Geraldo Rivera	Himself						Recurring
Gina Gershon	Pam Anderson						Guest
Andrew Rannells	Himself						Guest

== Main characters ==
=== Will Schuester ===
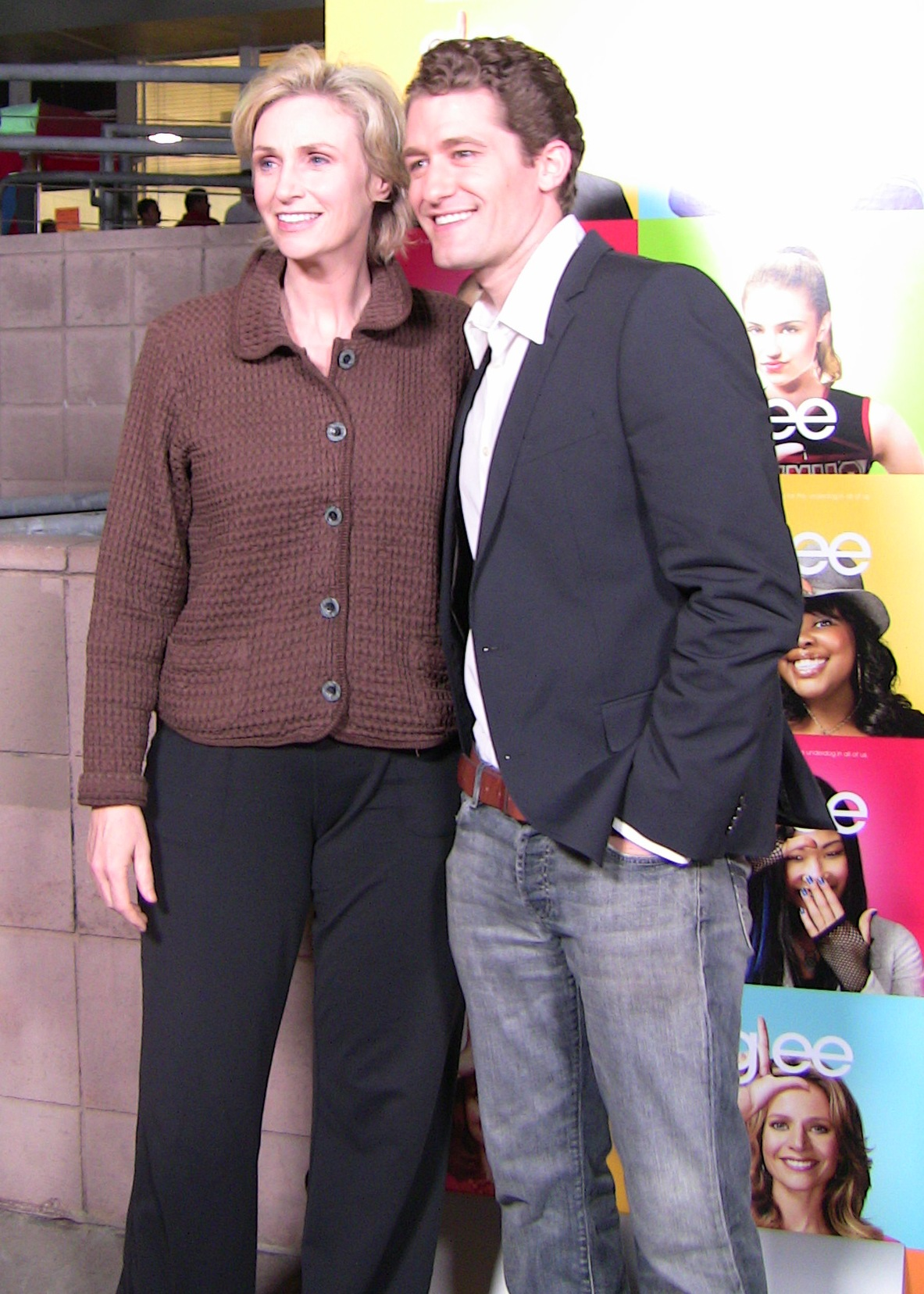
Jane Lynch and Matthew Morrison play rival club directors Sue Sylvester and Will Schuester.

William Michael "Will" Schuester (Matthew Morrison) is McKinley High's Spanish teacher who becomes director of the glee club, which he renames New Directions, hoping to restore it to its former glory. Morrison has assessed that the crux of Glee is "about [Will's] passion for music and influencing his kids". Will is married to his high school sweetheart Terri. Believing her to be pregnant, unaware that she is actually experiencing a hysterical pregnancy, he considers leaving the teaching field to become an accountant. He ultimately decides against it, though briefly works after hours at the school as a janitor to earn extra money. His dedication to the glee club wavers when his choreography skills are called into question, but after starting a well-received all-male a cappella group, the Acafellas, he recommits to the club. After discovering Terri was faking her pregnancy, Will ends his marriage and shares a kiss with Emma. Their relationship does not solidify over the remainder of the season, however, and Emma starts dating Carl Howell (John Stamos) at the end of the school year. In the second season, though Will tries to win Emma back, she marries Carl. Will has a brief relationship with Holly Holliday (Gwyneth Paltrow) starting in the episode "Sexy". Holly takes a job in Cleveland, leaving Will free to pursue Emma after Emma's marriage ends in an annulment. April Rhodes returns and asks for Will's help with her new Broadway project: a one-woman show entitled CrossRhodes, but he ultimately decides that his students in New Directions are more important than his dreams of Broadway. At the start of the third season, Will and Emma are living together. He proposes to her after New Year's, and she accepts. He later switches from teaching Spanish to teaching history, though he continues directing the glee club. New Directions wins Nationals, he and Emma have sex for the first time, and eight of his seniors graduate at the end of the year.

=== Rachel Berry ===
Rachel Barbra Berry (Lea Michele) is a "strong, driven" member of the glee club who is misunderstood by her peers. Michele took the role in Glee because of Rachel's characterization, explaining: "Not only is she a singer, but she has so much heart—I think it's what we need on TV." Michele described the first thirteen episodes of the series as: "Rachel's journey of finding herself within the glee club", explaining that: "She's learning how to be a team player and work within this group."

Rachel has an on-off relationship with Finn throughout the series. She briefly goes out with his best friend Puck, and later dates Jesse St. James (Jonathan Groff), the lead singer of rival glee club Vocal Adrenaline, who ultimately betrays her in favor of his club. Rachel, who has two gay fathers, discovers that Vocal Adrenaline coach Shelby Corcoran (Idina Menzel) is her birth mother, but the two fail to forge a relationship. At the end of season one, Finn professes his love for her. They date over the summer and for several episodes in season two, but break up when Rachel makes out with Puck in revenge for Finn having lied about losing his virginity to Santana in season one. At the end of season two, they renew their relationship after Nationals in New York, though Rachel warns Finn she will be returning to New York for good after she graduates. In the beginning of the third season, Rachel plays Maria in the school's production of West Side Story, and she and Finn have sex for the first time. In the new year, Finn asks Rachel to marry him, and she accepts. Although she blows her audition for a New York dramatic arts college, NYADA, her Nationals performance in Chicago serves as a redo and she is ultimately accepted, but Finn is rejected from his New York school. After graduation, on the day of their wedding, Finn drives her to the train station and announces she will be going to New York without him.

At NYADA, Rachel struggles to impress her dance teacher, Cassandra July, and embarks on a new romance with upperclassman Brody Weston. Santana, who has moved to New York and is staying with Rachel and Kurt, is suspicious of Brody; she initially believes he is a drug dealer, but later discovers he is a male escort, and gets Finn to come to New York and confront Brody. Brody and Rachel break up. Rachel auditions for Funny Girl and she gets the role. Finn's death affects her greatly. Rachel's friendship with Santana is fractured when Santana auditions to be her understudy and is given the job. The two reconcile after they both return to Lima when New Directions is disbanded by Sue. She leaves NYADA as she feels that she is not able to split her time between school and Broadway. Funny Girl opening night is a great success, but she later leaves the musical to be in a TV show. The show is cancelled after a single episode; she gets depressed and returns to Lima and tries to revive the glee club with the aid of Kurt, who is on leave from NYADA. After a successful season with New Directions, she asks to be reinstated at NYADA, and ultimately chooses to return despite being offered another role on Broadway. She also gets back together with Jesse, whom she later marries. In 2020, she becomes a surrogate mother for Kurt and Blaine, and wins a Tony award, thanking Will for his support.

=== Sue Sylvester ===
Susan Rodham "Sue" Sylvester (Jane Lynch) is the coach of the cheerleading squad called the Cheerios, and the glee club's "arch-nemesis." Lynch states that Sue is "pure evil and doesn't hide it," having been created as a product of Murphy, Brennan and Falchuk's "inner mean girl." With regards to her motivation, Lynch explained: "Sue will do whatever it takes to win. If that means she has to prostitute herself or take advantage of a 16-year-old boy, she'll do it. It's all about power and winning. That's her entire world view." Sue enlists cheerleaders Quinn, Brittany and Santana to help her bring the glee club down from the inside. She has her own spot on the local news, which she uses to editorialize on issues such as support for caning and littering. At the end of the episode "Vitamin D", Sue is made co-director of the glee club, but soon scales back her involvement to an advisory role. In the episode "Wheels", Sue allows Becky Jackson (Lauren Potter), a girl with Down syndrome, to join the Cheerios as a replacement for Quinn. It is later revealed that Sue has an older sister, Jean, who herself has Down Syndrome, showing a softer side to her normally abrasive character. Hoping to sabotage the glee club's chances of winning at sectionals, Sue gives the club's set list to rival glee club directors Grace Hitchens (Eve) and Dalton Rumba (Michael Hitchcock). When her actions are discovered by Principal Figgins (Iqbal Theba), Sue is suspended from the school. She is later reinstated after blackmailing Figgins, and wins her sixth consecutive national cheerleading title. In the season one finale, Sue judges in favor of New Directions at regionals, though they come third to rival clubs Vocal Adrenaline and Aural Intensity, and are disbanded for failing to place. Sue then blackmails Principal Figgins to reinstate the club, giving them another year to prove their worth to the school.

In the second season, Sue is appointed acting principal after having Figgins infected with the flu but she later stands down and Figgins is reinstated. Sue arranges to have the cheerleading regionals competition moved to conflict with the football championship, and she forces Quinn, Brittany, and Santana to quit glee club, which has to perform the halftime show since the Cheerios will be absent; the three of them ultimately perform with the glee club, resigning from the Cheerios. Missing three of its best cheerleaders, the Cheerios lose regionals after six straight nationals win. Faking a depression after the loss, Sue joins the glee club for a week; when she can't destroy it from within, she decides to coach one of their rivals, Aural Intensity, to a regionals victory over New Directions, but New Directions emerges victorious. Sue's sister, Jean, dies later in the season, and Sue is devastated and unable to cope; when New Directions helps with funeral arrangements and performs at Jean's funeral, Sue says she's giving up her frequent attempts to destroy the glee club, but she's back to her old ways in the third season when school starts in the fall. She also begins a run for a vacant Congressional seat, which she loses to Burt Hummel. In the episode "On My Way", Sue tells Quinn and Will that she's pregnant. She later finds out that she'll be having a baby girl, but it has birth defects. Figgins appoints swim coach Roz Washington (NeNe Leakes) Sue's co-coach for the Cheerios, but Sue makes a deal with him that if she helps New Directions win Nationals, she'll resume sole control of the Cheerios. Sue helps coach the glee club, and they win at Nationals, which puts her back in charge of cheerleading. In the fourth-season episode "Shooting Star", Becky fires two gunshots, and Sue covers for her, and she is fired. She is later re-hired (after framing Figgins) as principal when Becky confesses. During the rest of the series, Roz Washington is coach of the Cheerios. In the fifth season, she successfully shuts down the glee club and gives Will a job at Carmel High, coaching Vocal Adrenaline. In the sixth season, she continues her rivalry with the newly reinstated glee club until she is fired from her principal job after Becky exposes her and Superintendent Harris finds out about Sue's hurt locker filled with inappropriate paraphernalia. She then becomes coach of Vocal Adrenaline and in the series finale, she is the Vice-President of the United States

=== Finn Hudson ===
(Main Season 1–4) Finn Christopher Hudson (Cory Monteith) is overheard singing in the McKinley High locker room shower by Will Schuester and subsequently blackmailed to try out for the glee club, New Directions. As quarterback of the school's football team, and arguably one of the most popular students at McKinley, Finn risks alienation by his friends to join the glee club. He is dating cheerleader Quinn, but is conflicted by his growing feelings for Rachel. Quinn later tells Finn she is pregnant and he is the father. Finn intends to support her, unaware the father is actually his best friend Puck. He has a premature ejaculation problem, which causes him to believe he is the father of Quinn's baby despite the fact that they have never had sex. When he discovers the truth, he breaks up with Quinn and turns to pursuing Rachel. In the season one finale, he professes his love for her before New Directions performs at Regionals, and the second season finds Finn and Rachel a couple.

A flurry of infidelities forces the two apart, though Finn succeeds in winning Rachel back in the season two finale despite Rachel warning him that upon graduation she will be leaving Ohio for good. In the third season, Finn proposes to Rachel and she eventually accepts. They graduate in season finale, but while Rachel gets into a New York school, Finn does not; on their wedding day, he instead sends her off to New York without him to fulfill her dreams, and Finn enlists in the army to follow his late father's footsteps. He does not stay in touch with Rachel or Kurt for several months. He reappears unexpectedly that fall during the show's fourth season, while Rachel is attending NYADA, after he has been given an early discharge from the army. He feels that he doesn't belong in her world in New York, returns to Lima without telling her. She then breaks up with him.

In Lima, Finn is working at his stepfather Burt's tire shop, and Artie enlists his help there to co-direct the school musical, Grease, which had been Finn's suggestion. When Rachel comes to see the musical in "Glease", their reunion does not go well, and they agree to refrain from contact when Rachel visits Lima in the future. Will takes a leave of absence to be a member of a blue-ribbon panel in Washington, DC, and chooses Finn as his interim replacement; he takes over in "Dynamic Duets". While he has a rocky start in the position, they come to accept him as their leader. Finn turns to school counselor Emma Pillsbury, Will's fiancée, for aid on a number of occasions; when he finds her panicking over arranging her wedding to Will, he kisses her. Emma ultimately stands Will up at the altar and disappears, and although Finn helps Will find her, he still feels guilty over the kiss, and confesses to Will. This ends their working together on directing New Directions. One of the glee club members, Marley Rose, tells Finn he was a good teacher, and he soon enrolls in college to pursue a teaching degree. He later goes to New York after being told by Santana that Rachel's live-in boyfriend Brody is an escort, and physically attacks Brody, warning him to "stay away from my future wife". The character Finn is last seen in the episode "Sweet Dreams" wishing Rachel luck on her Funny Girl audition. Actor Cory Monteith died of a drug overdose in July 2013, and a tribute to Monteith and his character was held in the episode "The Quarterback". In the final moment of "Dreams Come True" a plaque shows that the auditorium has been named after him.

=== Kurt Hummel ===
Kurt Elizabeth Hummel (Chris Colfer) is a singer who is bullied by the football team. He has a high vocal range, and is identified by Fox as a soprano singer. His voice could actually be described as a countertenor. Colfer originally auditioned for the role of Artie, however Murphy was so impressed by his performance that the role of Kurt was created for him, replacing a character named Rajish who was initially intended to be a member of the glee club. The character's name is derived from The Sound of Music's Kurt von Trapp, whom Colfer once played in a production of the musical, and the German Hummel figurines due to his complexion. Colfer describes Kurt as "a tough guy in designer clothes", explaining that he "puts on a very confident, 'I'm better than you' persona, but underneath it all he's the same anxious and scared teen everyone is/was at some point." Over the course of the first season, Kurt comes out as gay and develops a crush on Finn. He also joins the football team as a kicker, with Finn's help, and the cheerleading squad as a singer, though he ultimately quits both. In the episode "Wheels", he competes with Rachel to perform "Defying Gravity" from Wicked. Murphy selected the song after Colfer relayed a story from his own high school days, whereby his drama teacher refused to let him sing it because of his gender. Kurt becomes Finn's step brother later on in the second season when their parents marry.

After Dave Karofsky bullies him into a depression early in the second season, Kurt becomes close friends with an openly gay student at Dalton Academy, named Blaine Anderson. After Karofsky kisses Kurt in the heat of an argument, Karofsky blackmails him into keeping it quiet, saying that if Kurt were to tell anyone of the kiss that they shared, he will kill him. Kurt transfers to Dalton Academy to escape further harassment as a result. Kurt then joins Dalton's show choir, The Warblers, and falls in love with Blaine. The two then begin a relationship. Kurt eventually returns to McKinley, and they formally declare their love at the end of the second season, and at the beginning of the third season, Blaine transfers to McKinley to be with Kurt. The two have their first sexual experience in the episode "The First Time", and are still a couple at the end of the school year, though Blaine still has another year of high school after Kurt graduates. Kurt and Rachel both apply to the same New York drama school, NYADA. Kurt becomes a finalist, and impresses the school's dean at his audition; he discovers the day of his graduation, however, that he was not accepted, though Rachel was. In first episode of the fourth season, "The New Rachel", Kurt and Rachel get an apartment together in New York. Kurt gets an internship at Vogue.com and inadvertently pulls away from Blaine; distraught, Blaine cheats on Kurt. After confessing to Kurt of his infidelity, Kurt severs all ties. He later tries to get into NYADA and Carmen Tibideaux asks him to perform a song on the spot to get into NYADA. He sings "Being Alive" and gets applauded for his performance and gets into NYADA. Kurt begins to mend his and Blaine's relationship in "Thanksgiving" and they spend Christmas together in New York City. He also learns that his father is suffering from cancer. He meets Adam, a British student and crushes on him briefly. He hooks up with Blaine at Will and Emma's wedding though he insists that they are not back together. Later in New York, Kurt confesses to Adam that though he tries hard to forget Blaine, he couldn't do it. Though Kurt couldn't give time to Vogue.com, his mentor Isabel is not ready to let him go. He goes to Lima for his father's tests and gets relieved on learning that Burt is out of danger. And he stays for Regionals on Blaine's insistence.

Kurt later gets back together with Blaine and accepts Blaine's proposal for marriage. He goes back to New York and starts his own band "Pamela-Lansbury". He recruits Elliot, Dani, Santana and Rachel to be his bandmates. Though he is a bit skeptical about Elliot's intentions at first, later he finds a good friend in him. Later, Blaine moves in with him after his graduation and Kurt starts to feel that he is losing his identity. They both decide to take things slow and Blaine decides to move out. Kurt gets bashed when he tries to help a gay kid from getting beaten up but he feels proud and confident after that incident. He becomes popular in NYADA and that causes insecurity in Blaine. He later assures Blaine of his love and they both decide to go on a healthy diet from then. Kurt asks Blaine to perform along with him in front of June Dolloway who takes interest in Blaine. But Kurt assures Blaine that he will support him, no matter what. Blaine lies to Kurt that he gets to perform in a showcase which is organised by June for Blaine. When Kurt learns about the lie, he lashes on Blaine. But later, Kurt reconciles with Blaine and promises to supports him throughout. Blaine, then surprises everyone when he asks Kurt to perform the last duet with him much to June's dismay. But June likes their performance and praises them. Blaine moves in with Kurt.

Kurt breaks up with Blaine as he does not feel ready for marriage, but realizes that he is still in love with him and goes back to Lima to help Rachel revive New Directions and also get back Blaine. However, Blaine has moved on and is dating Dave Karofsky. Kurt later gets trapped in an elevator along with Blaine by Sue who wants to get them back together; to escape, they meet Sue's demand that they kiss each other. They ultimately resume their relationship and marry in a double ceremony with Brittany and Santana. After the glee club wins Nationals, Kurt and Blaine move to New York where he completes his schooling at NYADA and graduates. In 2020, the two of them are well-known actors who also teach students in schools to accept everyone. They become parents with Rachel as their surrogate.

=== Mercedes Jones ===
(Main Season 1–4,6; Recurring Season 5) Mercedes Jones (Amber Riley) is a "diva-in-training who refuses to sing back-up" with a "flair for fashion". Early in season one, Mercedes develops a crush on Kurt, unaware that he is gay. She is hurt when he rejects her, but supportive when he confides his sexuality. After this, the two become especially close friends. Dismayed at never receiving solo songs, Mercedes and Kurt join the cheerleading squad, the Cheerios, as vocalists. She briefly dates Puck, but ultimately breaks up with him and quits the Cheerios, afraid of turning into someone she does not want to be. She becomes friends with Quinn when the pregnant ex-cheerleader gives her advice during her stint on the Cheerios, and when Quinn is unhappy having to stay at Puck's house, invites Quinn to move in with her family. When Quinn gives birth, she asks that Mercedes be present for the delivery of her child. After junior prom, Mercedes and Sam begin dating secretly, but he moves away during the summer. Mercedes has a new boyfriend, Shane, by the beginning of the third season. In the third episode, Mercedes quits the glee club and joins the new, rival McKinley show choir, the Troubletones, run by Shelby Corcoran, later recruiting Santana and Brittany to join her. When the Troubletones lose Sectionals to New Directions and Shelby quits, they return to New Directions. Sam returns to McKinley and attempts to rekindle his romance with Mercedes. She still has feelings for him, and eventually breaks up with Shane, though she refuses to date Sam while she is unsure of her true feelings. Sam continues to support her, and a YouTube video he posts of Mercedes singing results in her being offered a job as a backup singer in Los Angeles after she graduates. In the fourth season, Mercedes has moved there and is taking classes at UCLA as well as being a backup singer, though she returns to help with the school musical, for Thanksgiving, and for Mr. Schuester's wedding. Eventually she gives up on doing an album after her producer pressures her into showing more skin on her CD cover art.

=== Artie Abrams ===
Arthur "Artie" Abrams (Kevin McHale) is a guitarist and paraplegic manual wheelchair user. McHale described Artie as a "nerd" who loves the glee club wholeheartedly and uses it as a form of escapism. Artie uses a wheelchair due to a spinal cord injury he received in a car crash at the age of eight. During the first season, he begins to accept his disability and the fact he will never achieve his dream of becoming a dancer. In the first season, he has a relationship with fellow New Directions member Tina Cohen-Chang, who breaks up with him at the beginning of the second season. Artie then loses his virginity to cheerleader Brittany Pierce, and with encouragement from his former bully, Puck, they begin dating. The two remain a couple for most of the season before breaking up. In the third season, Artie, then a junior, directs the school musical and a television special featuring the glee club for the local PBS station. He also directs Grease along with Finn Hudson during his senior year. He gets accepted into a film school in New York. He later starts dating Kitty, who encourages him to keep their affair secret. But later, she reveals it to the Glee Club as she is sure about her love for him. Though he is the primary candidate for being the valedictorian, he loses it to Blaine as a result of his sacrifice for Tina. He goes to New York after his graduation and joins Film School. He later is tested positive for chlamydia. He returns to Lima in season six to help Brittany and Santana plan their wedding. After Tina's proposal to Mike Chang is rejected, Artie promises that if they are both single in ten years that they should marry each other. In the series finale, they are dating once again.

McHale joined Glee from a dance background, and found it challenging to adapt to using a wheelchair, but was able to utilize his dancing ability in the episode "Dream On", in which Artie dances in a shopping mall during a fantasy flash mob sequence. The episode "Wheels", which places focus on Artie and his disability, drew criticism from a committee of performers with disabilities, who felt that casting an able-bodied actor to play a disabled student was inappropriate. Glee's executive producer Brad Falchuk responded that while he understood the concern and frustration of disability advocates, McHale had the singing and acting ability, talent and charisma required for the role. McHale has also since stated that if Glee was created today, he would not have played Artie "knowing what we know now."Kevin McHale has the longest streak of appearing in episodes in a row with 104 episodes before having a break.

=== Tina Cohen-Chang ===
(Main Season 1–5; Recurring Season 6) Tina Cohen-Chang (Jenna Ushkowitz) auditions for the glee club with the song "I Kissed a Girl" by Katy Perry. She initially dresses in school-girl like clothing and gothic style clothing. She goes on a date with Artie, and confesses to him that she has been faking a speech impediment since the sixth grade, explaining that she wanted to drive people away, but now that she's a part of the glee club, she no longer wants that. Their relationship continues through the end of that first year. Tina and Mike Chang are counselors at Asian Camp over the summer, and they fall for each other; Tina formally breaks off with Artie at the beginning of the second season, and she and Mike are still in love when the school year ends, the only relationship in the glee club to survive the entire school year, and the longest unbroken relationship between the members since the club was formed. In the third season, her junior year and his senior year, she helps Mike when he decides to try out for the school musical and then to apply to dance school, and tells Rachel and the other girls that she had sex for the first time with Mike over the summer, losing her virginity. Tina breaks up with Mike over the summer after he graduates. She develops a brief obsessive crush on Blaine, but it is later diminished and turns into a close friendship.

=== Quinn Fabray ===
(Main Season 1–3; Guest Season 4–6) Lucy Quinn Fabray (Dianna Agron), is introduced as Finn's girlfriend, head of the cheerleading squad and president of the celibacy club. She was described by Agron as Rachel's enemy, and "terrible, the meanest girl". Quinn joins the glee club because Finn is a member, and because cheerleading coach Sue Sylvester wants her to bring the club down from the inside. She oscillates between desiring acceptance, which she finds in New Directions, and desiring popularity, which she finds on the Cheerios. She reveals to Finn that she is pregnant and tells him that the baby is his, although the real father is Finn's best friend Puck. Eventually the deception is revealed, and Quinn decides to give the baby away. Terri Scheuster tries on several occasions to get Quinn to agree to give her the baby after it is born so that she can continue her deception that she is pregnant with her husband Will's baby. However, in the season finale, Quinn gives birth to her daughter, whom Puck names Beth, and she is adopted by Vocal Adrenaline coach Shelby Corcoran (Idina Menzel), Rachel's birth mother.

At the beginning of the second season, Quinn rejoins the Cheerios and again becomes the captain, regaining her popularity, though later in the season she quits to remain faithful to New Directions. She begins a relationship with Sam Evans (Chord Overstreet) in "Duets" but is later unfaithful to him, rekindling her romance with Finn. In the episode "Comeback", Sam makes a last-ditch attempt to win her back, but ends the relationship after finding out from Santana that Quinn cheated on him with Finn. Quinn and Finn get back together, though eventually Finn realizes his true feelings for Rachel, and breaks up with Quinn. It is also revealed that Quinn's real name is Lucy Quinn Fabray and she used to be bullied for being fat, and eventually decided to have a nose job.

During the summer between seasons two and three, Quinn undergoes a transformation: she dyes her hair, gets a tattoo and a nose ring, and takes to smoking behind the bleachers with her new clique the Skanks. However, in "I Am Unicorn", when Shelby Corcoran joins the McKinley High faculty and talks to Quinn about being involved in Beth's life, Quinn pretends to clean up her act and returns to New Directions. What she intends is not to merely be in Beth's life, but to get full custody of her daughter. Her attempts to prove Shelby an unfit mother fail; eventually, she realizes with Rachel's help that Shelby is Beth's true mother, and stops trying to reclaim Beth. Shelby resigns and leaves McKinley. Quinn subsequently receives a college acceptance letter from Yale. At the end of "On My Way", while driving to Finn and Rachel's wedding, her car is struck by a truck and she suffers a spinal injury that requires her to use a wheelchair for many weeks. She is eventually able to walk again, and even to dance in performance with the glee club.

She makes brief appearances during seasons four, five and six. In season four, she is seen forming a friendship with Kitty, visits Rachel with Santana to convince her not to do a nude scene, and hooking up with Santana twice while being drunk at Will and Emma's supposed wedding. Quinn comes back for two episodes during the fifth season and becomes Puck's girlfriend again. For season six, she helps Rachel and Kurt with their new glee club and along with Tina helps Becky with her new boyfriend.

=== Santana Lopez ===
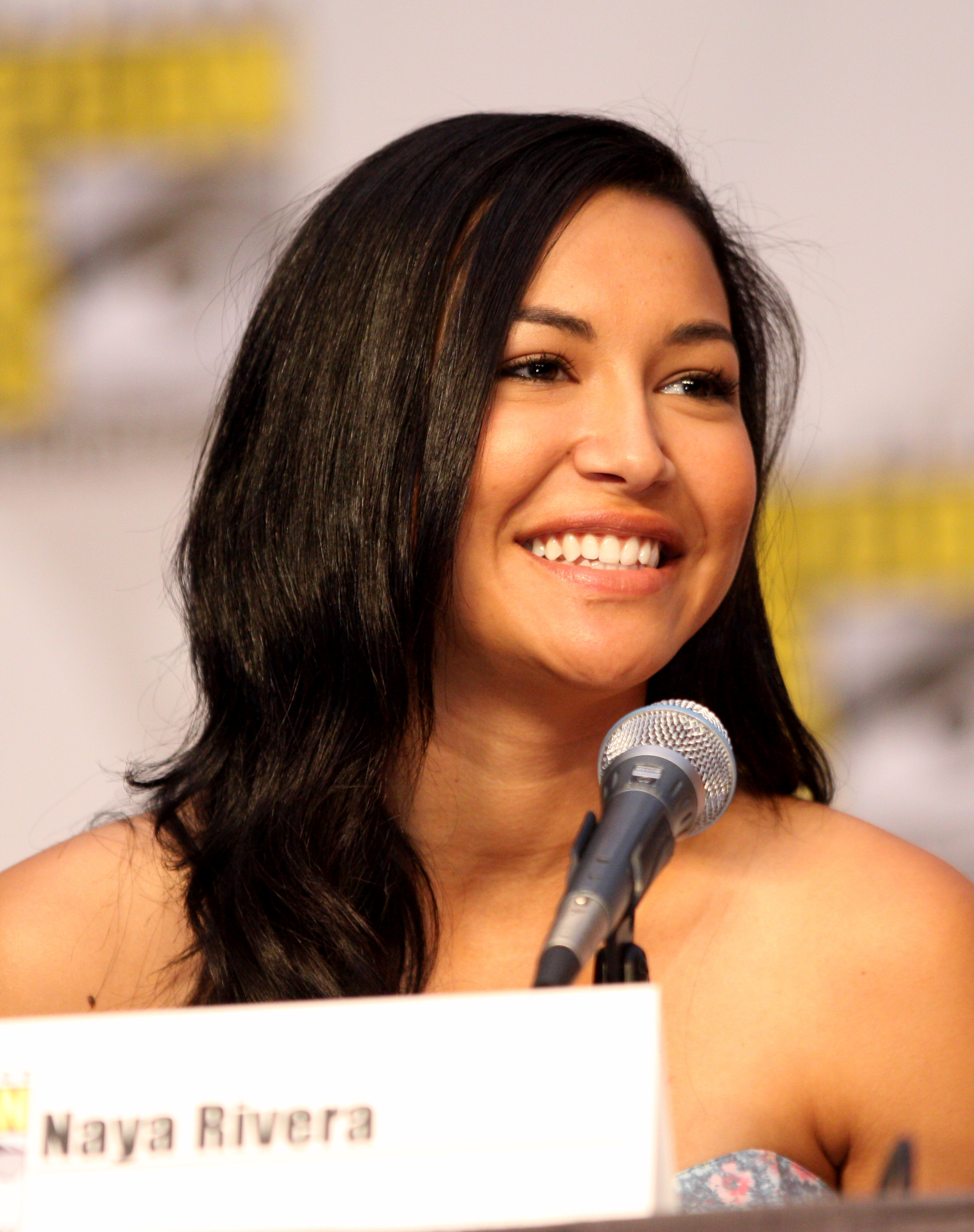
Naya Rivera

(Main Season 2–5; Recurring Season 1,6) Santana Diabla Lopez (Naya Rivera) is a cheerleader who joins the glee club in the episode "Showmance". Initially a spy for cheerleading coach Sue Sylvester, she comes to enjoy her club participation. Her romantic relationships with fellow members Puck and Sam are followed by the realization that she is gay and in love with her best friend Brittany Pierce, who is bisexual. Brittany loves Santana too, but she is with Artie Abrams, whom she doesn't want to leave, but she keeps Santana's secret to herself. Santana can't accept her sexuality because she is ashamed and too afraid of coming out. Therefore, she tried to hide her sexual orientation and use football jock Dave Karofsky (who is also closeted) as a beard to maintain her heterosexual facade and to boost her chances of becoming prom queen, though she fails at the latter.

Having originated as a minor antagonist, Santana's role became more prominent in the second half of the first season, and she became a main character in season two. Rivera characterized Santana as "a bit of a bad girl", prone to sarcastic remarks. Though she stated in May 2009 that Santana "loves boys", she later deemed Brittany her character's soul mate. In March 2011, Falchuk confirmed, "Santana is a lesbian. She might not be ready to come out yet, but she is."

During the season three premiere, as a show of loyalty to Sue, she participates in setting one of the glee club's pianos on fire and is dismissed from New Directions by Mr. Schuester. She returns briefly to the club, and then abandons it for the new, rival McKinley show choir, the Troubletones, run by Shelby Corcoran, but when the Troubletones lose to New Directions at Sectionals and disband, she returns again. She starts dating Brittany, which is initially kept a secret. In the Episode "I Kissed a Girl", she is outed as a lesbian by Finn, and the relationship between these two girls becomes public knowledge. Due to this, Santana is disowned by her grandmother. The New Directions, however, support Santana during her coming-out period. At Brittany's suggestion, Sue arranged for Santana a cheerleading scholarship to a top college program. Though at graduation, Santana decides she wants to go to New York to perform, and her mother presents her with the money to help fund the attempt. Santana changes her mind over the summer and accepts the cheerleading scholarship, which is to a school in Louisville, Kentucky. Later, she breaks up with Brittany due to the distance. In the episode "Diva", Santana has dropped out of college, and of Brittany's suggestion, she moves in with Kurt and Rachel in New York. In the episode "Tina in the Sky with Diamonds", Santana meets and starts dating a waitress at the Spotlight Diner, Dani (Demi Lovato). Santana later gets back together with Brittany in the final season, and marries her, along with Blaine and Kurt.

=== Brittany Pierce ===
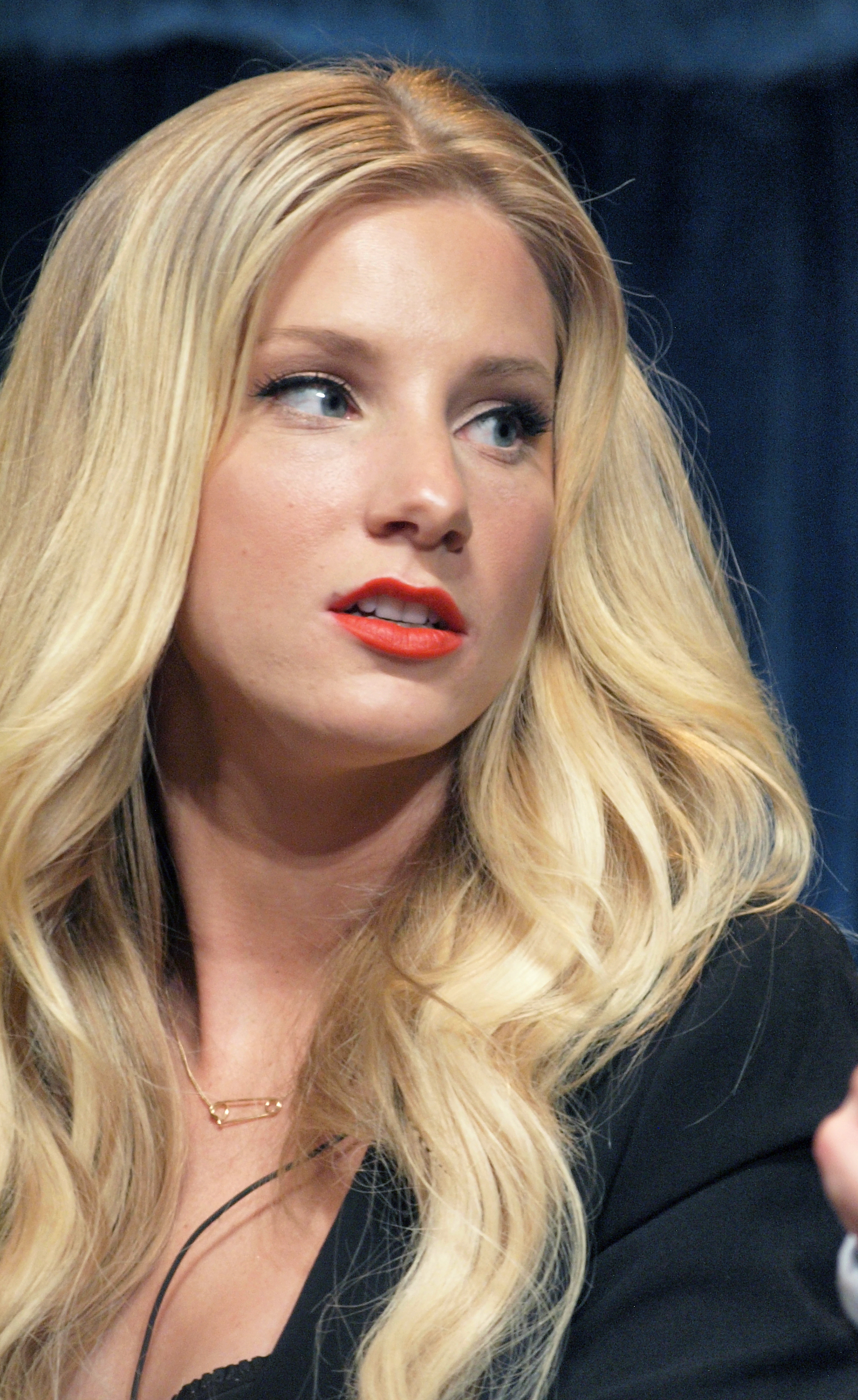
Heather Morris

(Main Season 2–4; Recurring Season 1; Guest Season 5–6) Brittany Susan Pierce (Heather Morris) is a bisexual cheerleader who joins the glee club with Quinn and Santana in the episode "Showmance". Prior to appearing in Glee, Morris was a back-up dancer for Beyoncé Knowles. She was originally hired as a choreographer to teach cast members Colfer and Ushkowitz the "Single Ladies" dance. A week later, she was cast as Brittany. Morris had a recurring role throughout the first season, and was promoted to a series regular for season two. Many of Brittany's lines are unscripted, and are instead devised by Murphy during filming, or improvised by Morris. Morris portrays Brittany as being "literally insane". She is used by the series' writers to say things no other character would, to the point that Morris considers some of her lines nonsensical. Brittany's character traits include finding recipes confusing, cheating off intellectually disabled classmates and not knowing her right hand from her left. She makes her singing debut in the season two episode "Britney/Brittany", performing three songs—"I'm a Slave 4 U", "Me Against the Music" and "Toxic"—all by Britney Spears. Brittany has a physical relationship with Santana, in which Santana gives Brittany a hickey in the season 2 episode "Duets"; in that episode Brittany also has a brief romance with Artie that leads to a more serious relationship later in the season. She quits the cheerleading squad in "The Sue Sylvester Shuffle". In the episode "New York", Brittany tells Santana that she loves her far more than she's ever loved anyone else. In the third season, she is elected senior class president, defeating Kurt. She and Santana formally begin dating, and after Santana is outed by Finn, they are open about their relationship. Their relationship ends, however, when Santana breaks up with her due to the distance. She later develops a relationship with Sam. Jarrett Wieselman of the New York Post has compared Morris as Brittany to Lynch as Sue, deeming her "one of the funniest second bananas on TV". During season 6, her parents tell Brittany that her biological father is Stephen Hawking. Later, at her and Santana's wedding she convinces Blaine and Kurt to marry alongside them as a joint ceremony.

=== Noah Puckerman ===
(Main Season 1–4; Guest Season 5–6) Noah "Puck" Puckerman (Mark Salling) is Finn's best friend and football teammate, who initially disapproves of Finn joining the glee club. Puck joins Will's all-male a cappella group, the Acafellas, hoping to impress the mothers at the school's PTA meeting, as he prefers older women. He later discovers that he is the father of Quinn's baby. She rejects him when he offers to support her and the baby, calling him a "Lima loser". Later in the same episode, Puck joins the glee club. He briefly dates Rachel and Mercedes, but ruins his chances with Quinn by sexting Santana in her presence. Regardless, Puck attends the birth of his daughter, who he names Beth, and tells Quinn that he loves her.

In season two, Puck is sent to juvenile detention for stealing an ATM. The producers engineered his absence from the series to allow a romance to develop between Quinn and new student Sam Evans. Following his return, Puck helps Artie hook up with Brittany, and recruits Lauren Zizes for glee club. He falls in love with Lauren, and they run unsuccessfully for junior prom king and queen together, but she breaks up with him at the beginning of their senior year in season three.

Shelby Corcoran, who adopted baby Beth, gets a teaching job at McKinley, and invites Puck and Quinn to be a part of Beth's life, provided they both become more responsible. Puck does so, and Shelby allows him to see Beth. Quinn decides she wants to regain custody of Beth from Shelby, but Puck is torn, and tells Shelby of Quinn's plans. He then falls in love with Shelby. She sleeps with him once, though she tells him afterward she has made a mistake, to his disgust, and subsequently resigns from McKinley. Puck later gets into academic trouble, but realizes he needs to graduate after meeting up again with his high-school-dropout father, but he fails a crucial test that will keep him from graduating with the rest of the seniors. Coach Beiste breaks up a fight between him and another student, and helps him get a retest and to study for it. A kiss from Quinn brings back Puck's confidence: he passes the retest and graduates.

When he and Quinn both return for the end of the McKinley High Glee club, he is dismayed to see she has a rich boyfriend, Biff Macintosh. However, Puck fights for Quinn, after Biff texts through her performance of Toxic with Santana and Brittany and yells at her after she tells the truth about her pink hair, tattoos and Beth, and the two kiss after Quinn asks him to stay with her. In the next episode, the two sing a duet, Just Give Me a Reason, and confess their new relationship to the Glee club Alumni. Although, in season six (A Wedding), Puck is seen dancing with Blaine's mom and Quinn is absent.

=== Sam Evans ===
(Main Season 4–6; Recurring Season 2–3) Samuel "Sam" Evans (Chord Overstreet) is a transfer student who joins the football team in season two. Encouraged by Finn to audition for New Directions, he joins the males of the group in a performance of "Billionaire", the same song with which Overstreet studio tested for Glee. Despite some trepidation about the effect it may have on his social status, Sam eventually joins the glee club. With the connivance of Finn and Rachel, he and Quinn are partnered for, and win, a duet competition within the group, after which their victory dinner turns into a first date; the victory later nets them a lead performance at sectionals. This becomes a relationship, but Quinn is later unfaithful to him, rekindling her romance with Finn. In the episode "Comeback", Sam makes a last-ditch attempt to win her back, but ends the relationship after finding out from Santana that Quinn cheated on him with Finn. At some point after going to junior prom together, Sam and Mercedes start to secretly date. His family moves to Kentucky over the summer, but Finn and Rachel convince him to come back to New Directions late that fall in time to compete in Sectionals. Although Mercedes has a new boyfriend, he wants to get her back. In season four, he develops friendships with Blaine and Brittany, the latter of which becomes a romantic relationship.

Following Overstreet's casting, media speculation suggested Sam might have been created as a boyfriend for Kurt. Overstreet later confirmed this, but stated that his storyline had been adjusted to pair Sam with Quinn, as a result of the chemistry the producers detected between himself and Agron. Overstreet left the show when his option for being a series regular in season three was not picked up, but he returned as Sam in the eighth episode of the third season for a multi-episode arc. On October 24, 2011, Murphy officially announced that Sam would be returning as a recurring character, "just in time for Sectionals". Overstreet was promoted to the main cast in the fourth season.

=== Blaine Anderson ===
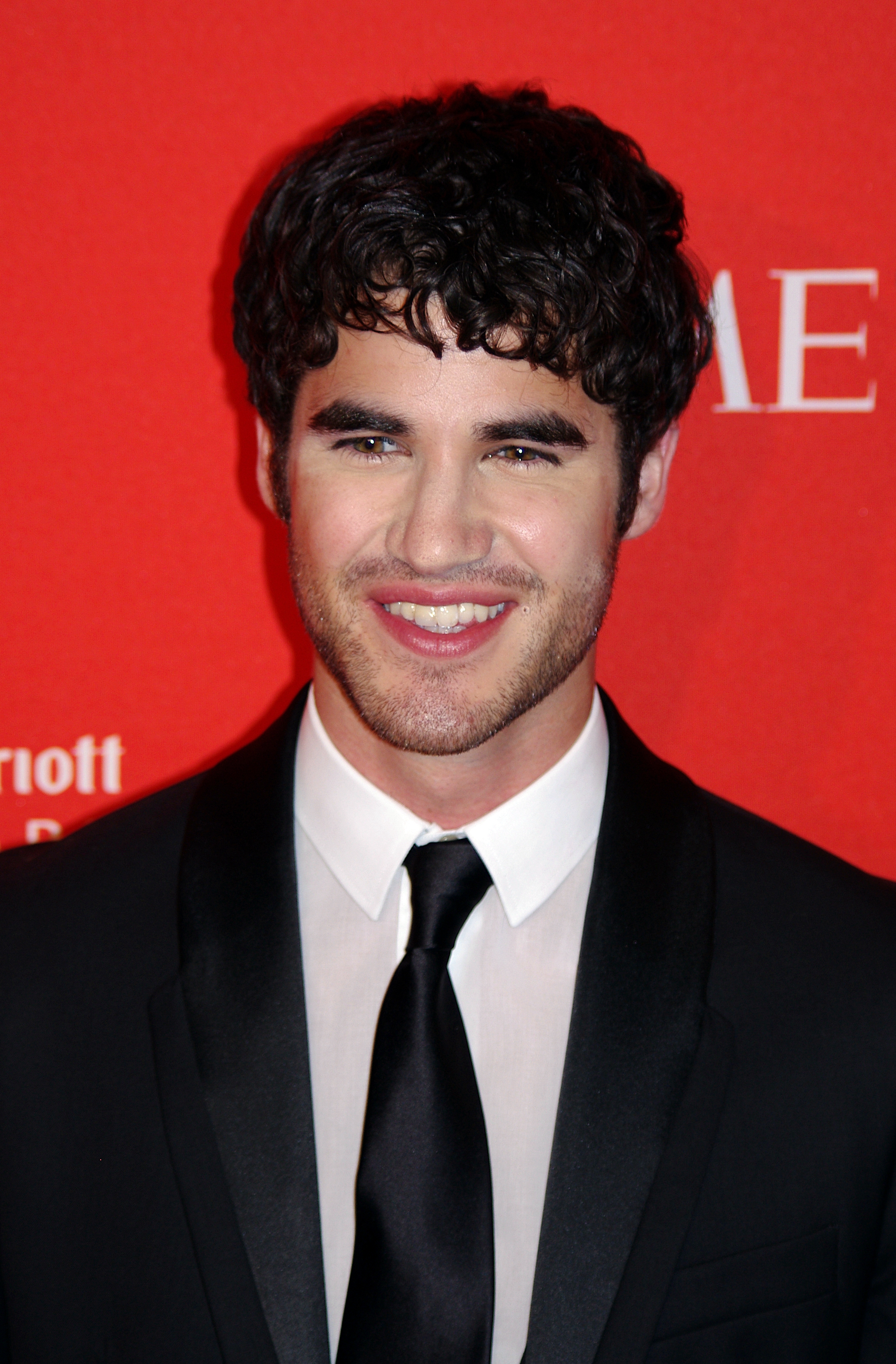
Darren Criss

(Main Season 3–6; Recurring Season 2) Blaine Devon Anderson (Darren Criss) is a recurring character in season 2 and a main character in seasons 3–6. He is introduced as an openly gay student at Dalton Academy and a member of The Warblers, a Sectionals and Regionals rival of New Directions. While Blaine was initially a recurring character, Criss was promoted to the main cast for the third season. The character is a love interest for Kurt, though in the episode "Blame It on the Alcohol", he and Rachel have a brief fling, resulting in Blaine reasserting his identity as gay. Murphy stated, "Darren has a major, major arc... He sort of becomes Kurt's mentor and then maybe love—he had to leave his own school because of bullying and goes to an all-boys academy and finds acceptance because that school has a no-bullying, zero-tolerance policy." Blaine becomes a role model for Kurt, who develops a crush on him. During "Original Song", Blaine realizes he reciprocates Kurt's feeling, and they kiss. At the beginning of season three, Blaine decides to transfer to McKinley to be with Kurt, and joins New Directions. The two have their first sexual experience in the episode "The First Time". Blaine is injured during a confrontation between New Directions and the Warblers, and has eye surgery to repair the damage. His relationship with Kurt is later strained by Kurt's eagerness to leave for New York after graduation, which would separate the two at least until Blaine graduated the following year, but the two patch things up, and are still a couple at the end of the school year.

At the beginning of his senior year, Blaine becomes the lead singer of New Directions and successfully prompts Kurt to follow his New York City dreams. Blaine successfully runs for senior class president. Kurt inadvertently pulls away from Blaine due to his Vogue.com internship; distraught, Blaine cheats on Kurt. After confessing to Kurt of his infidelity, Kurt severs all ties. Hunter Clarington (Nolan Gerard Funk), the new captain of the Dalton Academy Warblers, attempts to convince Blaine to return to the Warblers. Blaine becomes conflicted, but Sam Evans (Chord Overstreet) ultimately convinces him that, despite having done a bad thing, Blaine is still a good person and an important member of New Directions. Kurt begins to mend their relationship in "Thanksgiving" and they spend Christmas together in New York City. He later hooks up with Kurt at Will's wedding where Kurt insists that they are not going to become a couple. He becomes best friends with Sam, developing a minor crush on him that he later overcomes (and which Sam finds somewhat flattering). Tina harbors a crush on Blaine, but she realizes her folly and becomes his friend. He, along with Sam reveal the cheating done by the Warblers and earn New Directions a slot at Regionals, which they eventually win.

He later reconciles with Kurt and proposes marriage to him, getting help from several other show choirs. Later, he auditions for NYADA and gets in. After graduation, he moves in with Kurt in New York. But later, both of them decide to have their own space for some time and Blaine decides to share a room with Sam, who has also moved to New York. Kurt asks Blaine to sing a song with him in front of an influential NYADA donor, June Dolloway, who comes to the school for a dance studio inaugural. June takes interest in Blaine and decides to organize a one-night-only show for Blaine. Blaine wants to involve Kurt in it but she refuses. Blaine lies to Kurt and tells him that he will also get to sing a song in the showcase. When Kurt discovers the lie, he is very upset, but they ultimately reconcile and Kurt decides to support his fiancé. At the showcase, Blaine invites Kurt to perform a last duet with him much to June's dismay, but she enjoys the performance and praises them. Blaine later moves in with Kurt.

Kurt eventually breaks off their engagement because he does not feel ready for marriage. Blaine becomes depressed, so much so that he does poorly at NYADA and is expelled from school. He returns to Lima and starts coaching the Warblers and he also starts to date Dave Karofsky, which comes as a shock to Kurt when he realizes he still loves Blaine and goes to Lima to get him back. Blaine later gets trapped in an elevator with Kurt, as part of a plan by Sue to get them back together, and she demands they kiss each other to get out, which they eventually do. They kiss again when they sing together during Rachel's house farewell party. Blaine later breaks up with Karofsky and gets back together with Kurt. They get married along with Brittany and Santana. They later move back to New York when Blaine gets accepted into NYU and Kurt returns to NYADA. After five years, both are successful actors, and they also give performances for the LGBT community and teach the students in schools to accept everyone. They are about to become fathers, with Rachel as their surrogate.

=== Mike Chang ===
(Main Season 3–4; Recurring Season 1–2; Guest Season 5–6) Michael Robert "Mike" Chang, Jr. (Harry Shum, Jr.) is a football player and dancer who joins New Directions in the episode "Preggers". Shum stated that Mike is shy, and that he joins the glee club despite it being "social suicide" as "he has finally found a place where he can express himself and feel accepted". Initially a supporting character with no storylines of his own, Mike was slowly developed by the series writers. In the final episode of season one, Mike says that before New Directions, "I was afraid to dance outside my room." In season two he begins dating Tina, and gives his first lead musical performance dueting with her on "Sing!" from A Chorus Line. He is subsequently selected to perform a dance routine with Brittany for Sectionals in "Special Education". He performs the show's first solo dance routine in "A Night of Neglect". Mike states that he is a senior in the season three premiere, "The Purple Piano Project", and Shum as Mike was promoted to the main cast for the show's third season. Mike tries out for the school musical, West Side Story, against his father's wishes, and is briefly disowned by him, though his father later comes to understand Mike's desire to become a dancer and supports his decision to go to college for dance. Mike is given a scholarship to attend the Joffrey Ballet school in Chicago, and graduates at the end of the season. He and Tina are still a couple at the end of the year, but she breaks up with him over the summer. During the fourth season, Mike visits McKinley from the Joffrey on four occasions: to help Artie and Finn direct the school musical, Grease; to help choreograph the New Directions songs for Sectionals and later Regionals; and to attend the aborted first wedding ceremony of Will and Emma. Despite being a guest star in season 2 he appears in all episodes.

=== Emma Pillsbury ===
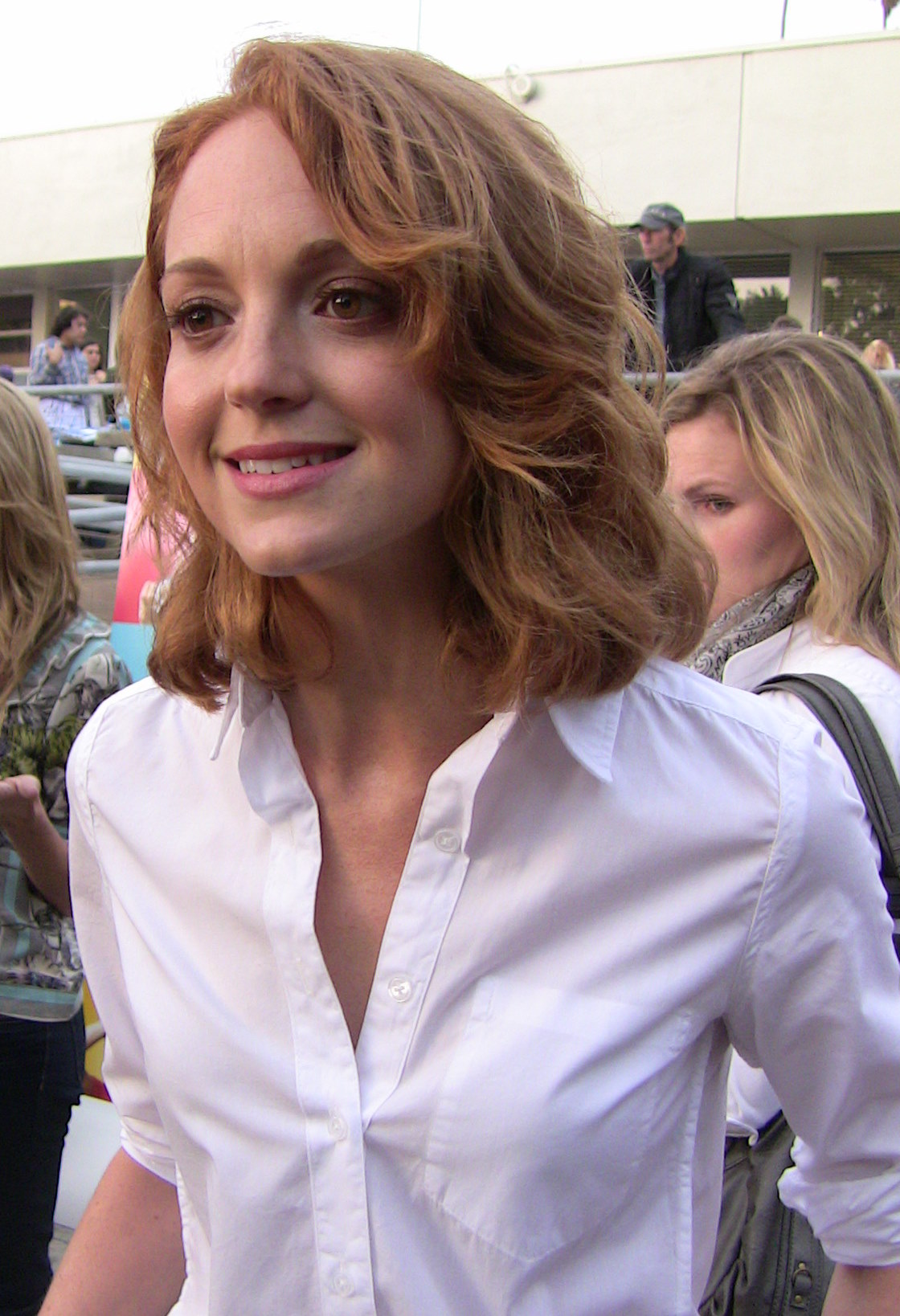
Jayma Mays portrays guidance counselor Emma Pillsbury.

(Main Season 1–3; Recurring Season 4; Guest Season 5–6) Emma Pillsbury (Jayma Mays) is the school's guidance counselor who has OCD, with obsessions and compulsions primarily focused on contamination and cleanliness. She has romantic feelings for Will. Mays has deemed Emma an "amazing" character to play, explaining: "I don't find that female characters are always written with a lot of depth, but she's so well defined on the page. Sure, she's terrified of germs and in love with a married man, so seeing her as the voice of reason for the kids is amazing." Glee's costume designer Lou Eyrich selects "quirky" outfits for Emma, to reflect her "sunny disposition". In an attempt to get over Will, Emma begins dating football coach Ken Tanaka, becoming engaged to him in the episode "Vitamin D". However, when Will is unable to attend a competition with the glee club, Emma volunteers to take them in his place, postponing her own wedding by several hours. Acknowledging her continuing feelings for Will, Ken breaks up with her on their wedding day. Emma submits her resignation as guidance counselor, but as she is leaving the school, Will finds her and stops her with a kiss. She reveals to Will that she is a virgin, but does not go through with her plan to lose her virginity to him. At the end of the first season, she tells Will she has started dating a dentist named Carl Howell, and in the second season her relationship with Carl (John Stamos) blossoms to the point that they get married in Las Vegas in the episode "Special Education". It is subsequently revealed in the episode "Sexy" that her marriage with Carl is facing difficulties and has not been consummated. She admits that she still has feelings for Will, and she and Carl separate; he later requests an annulment of their marriage. She begins to get treatment for her OCD in "Born This Way". When the third season begins, she and Will are living together. In the mid-season episode "Yes/No", Will asks Emma to marry him, and she accepts. In the penultimate episode, "Nationals", Emma and Will have sex for the first time. After their first wedding falls through as she runs away after she and Finn lie about kissing, Emma and Will begin to date again. Will reproposes and they marry with all of the New Directions present.

=== Terri Schuester ===
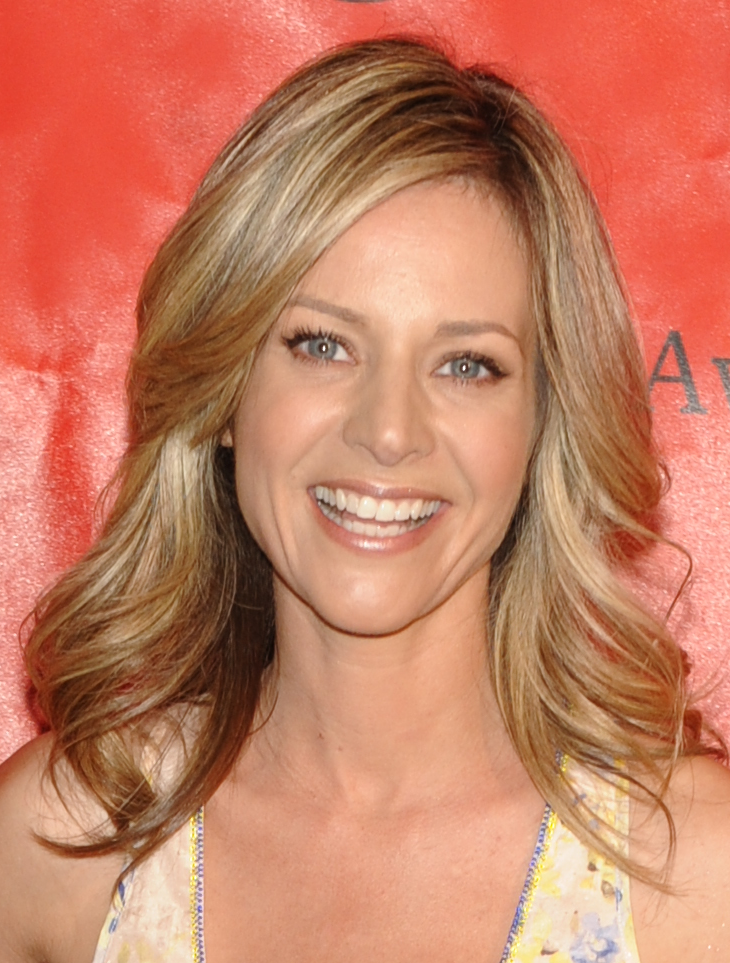
Jessalyn Gilsig portrays Will Schuester's wife, Terri.

(Main Season 1–2;Guest Season 4;Recurring Season 6)Terri Del Monico-Schuester (Jessalyn Gilsig) was Will's wife of five years, but they were together fifteen years total. Terri briefly believes herself to be pregnant, and pushes Will to take a better paying job as an accountant. She discovers she has actually experienced a hysterical pregnancy, but hides this from Will, afraid he will leave her. After confiding her deception in her sister Kendra, Terri approaches pregnant cheerleader Quinn Fabray, with an interest in her baby. She briefly becomes the school nurse, but is asked to step down after giving the glee club pseudoephedrine tablets. In the episode "Mattress", Will uncovers Terri's ruse when he discovers her pregnancy pad in a drawer. Terri begins attending therapy, but Will tells her he no longer loves her and leaves her as he falls in love with guidance counselor Emma Pillsbury. Their divorce is finalized late in the first season. Terri manages to seduce a sick and lonely Will in the second-season episode "The Substitute", but she is rebuffed by him when he recovers. Near the end of the second season, Terri is recruited by Sue Sylvester to join Sue's League of Doom to destroy the New Directions glee club directed by Will, but Terri undoes the damage and tells Will that she's been promoted to manager at work, and is being transferred to a new store in Miami.

Gilsig has deemed Terri "a woman of conviction", willing to do "whatever it takes" to keep Will from leaving her. She explained that Will and Terri's communication is weak and that Terri is "missing a lot of the skills for the marriage", commenting that Terri feels threatened by Will's commitment to the glee club, worried that it will pull him away from her. Gilsig characterized Terri as emotionally still being in high school, and as of December 2009 did not know how long her character would feature in the series, as she was initially only created as an obstacle to come between Emma and Will. Even though she has star billing in season 2 she only appears sporadically and much less than guest stars Chord Overstreet and Harry Shum Jr who both later get promoted to main cast.

=== Burt Hummel ===
(Main Season 2; Recurring Season 1,3; Guest Season 4–6) Burt Hummel (Mike O'Malley) is Kurt's father and Finn's stepfather to whom Kurt comes out in the episode "Preggers". Both James Poniewozik for Time and Tim Stack for Entertainment Weekly praised O'Malley's performance in the storyline, with Poniewozik additionally commenting: "the fact that Dad [...] ends up not being the boor we think he's going to be is one of the first signs that Glee is growing up as a series, that having established a world of primary-color stereotypes, it's now willing to subvert those expectations." Initially a recurring cast member, O'Malley was promoted to a series regular for season two, though he reverted to the recurring cast for the third and fourth seasons.

During the first season, Kurt acts as a matchmaker for Burt and Carole Hudson (Romy Rosemont), Finn's widowed mother. He feels left out when Burt and Finn bond, but Burt reassures him that he will always come first. Burt and Carole briefly live together, until he throws Finn out for using a homophobic slur against Kurt. In season two, Burt has a heart attack but recovers. He and Carole marry, using their vows to express pride in their sons. In the third season, Burt wages a write-in campaign for Congress against leading candidate Sue Sylvester, and wins. He divides his time between Washington and Lima, acts as a father for both Kurt and Finn, and is there with Carole for both the Regionals show choir competition and the graduation of their two sons. He sends Kurt to New York in the fall, and when he visits at Christmas, reveals that he has recently been treated for prostate cancer, and that it appears to have been caught in time. His doctor tells him that he is cancer free a few months later.

=== Coach Beiste ===
(Recurring Season 2–5; Main Season 6) Sheldon (named Shannon before transition in season 6) Beiste (Dot-Marie Jones) is introduced as the new football coach for the McKinley High Titans in "Audition", the premiere episode of season two. He comes to William McKinley High with an enviable record of coaching successful football teams, and Principal Figgins (Iqbal Theba) boosts the football program budget for him by reducing the cheerleading and glee club budgets, which alarms coach Sue Sylvester (Jane Lynch) and director Will Schuester (Matthew Morrison), respectively, and drives them into a temporary alliance against him. Beiste is dismayed by their rudeness, but forgives Will when he apologizes and goes on to develop a friendship with him. He contemplates resigning as coach upon learning that several students have been fantasizing about him in order to curb their arousal while making out. Will has the students apologize and earn his forgiveness. When antagonism flares between the football team's glee and non-glee factions, Beiste forces the entire football team to work together with the glee club for one week; despite encountering resistance and set-backs, the plan is ultimately successful and the team wins the championship game.

In the third season, Beiste continues as football coach, and is recruited by Will to co-direct the school musical West Side Story with guidance counselor Emma Pillsbury (Jayma Mays) and Artie. He orders his football team to play the Jets in the show. He also takes on the task of running the school elections. In the episode "The First Time" he begins dating Ohio State football recruiter Cooter Menkins (Eric Bruskotter), who is scouting for talent at McKinley, but discovers in "I Kissed a Girl" that Sue has become his rival for Cooter's affections, just as Beiste comes to realize that he loves Cooter, thus prompting his first solo song, "Jolene". He later tells Emma and Sue, in episode "Yes/No", that he and Cooter have impulsively gotten married. A few months later, in the episode "Choke", he is hit by his husband, Cooter, and given a black eye. Although initially convinced by Sue and Roz Washington (NeNe Leakes) to leave for his own safety, Beiste later returns home and gives Cooter a second chance, though he does ultimately leave Cooter and gives him back Bieste's wedding ring. In season 4, he reveals that he has romantic feelings for Will but Will does not and he tries to help him by making him an online dating profile. Will finds a match for him, Ken Tanaka, whose job he took over. In season 5, he helps Puck move on after Finn's death.

In the sixth season, after having trouble coming to terms, Beiste comes out as transgender and although he gets backlash from rival schools, Will, Sam and Unique help him make the transition from Shannon to Sheldon. He is also seen in the last performance of the show.

One article described Beiste as a "wounded giant—a 40-year-old who'd never been kissed", and Jones's portrayal of him as "humorous and heart-wrenching". Jones had previously worked with Glee co-creators Ryan Murphy and Brad Falchuk on Nip/Tuck, and when she encountered Falchuk at a local supermarket she says she told him, "'Write me something', just joking, you know, but not really." Still, she was shocked to hear from her agent two months later that Murphy had done so. She knew very little about the role initially: "When I signed my contract, it didn't even have a character name—just two quotation marks." In her acting career, Jones has "played every tough chick possible", and in early 2012 described the role of Beiste as one "where I still get to be the tough coach, but be vulnerable, have heart and have a love interest". Jones received an Emmy nomination for Outstanding Guest Actress in a Comedy Series for her work as Beiste in Glee's second season, and submitted her performance in the episode "Never Been Kissed" for final judging. She was one of three actresses from the show to be nominated in that category in 2011; the victor was another Glee nominee, Gwyneth Paltrow. She was also part of the Glee cast ensemble that was nominated in December 2011 for the Outstanding Performance by an Ensemble in a Comedy Series award at the 18th Screen Actors Guild Awards. In 2012, Jones was nominated for an Emmy again, the only actor from Glee nominated that year.

=== Unique Adams ===
(Main Season 5; Recurring Season 4; Guest Season 3,6) Wade "Unique" Adams (Alex Newell) first appears in the third-season episode "Saturday Night Glee-ver" as a new featured singer in Vocal Adrenaline who is a fan of both Mercedes and Kurt despite being a competition rival. Wade is a young trans woman, who wants to perform in competition as Unique but she lacks the confidence, until Mercedes and Kurt persuade her. When she appears on stage in the Glee Club Regionals competition, Unique is a success—so much so that Vocal Adrenaline director Jesse St. James decides to build the group's Nationals routine around Unique, and to promote her as a show choir star. Unique is dismayed by the publicity and pressure, but after a pep talk from Kurt and Mercedes, performs and wins the MVP award at Nationals competition, though Vocal Adrenaline comes in second to New Directions. In season four, she transfers to McKinley where she becomes a part of the New Directions. She develops a crush on Ryder, but is too afraid to demonstrate it, so she makes a fake account to get close to him. At the end of the fourth season, Ryder finds out that Unique has been behind the fake account and he tells her that he will never speak to her ever again. Although, she has felt more confident about herself since she joined the New Directions, she still struggles with others accepting her. She, along with some of the other members of New Directions transfer to other schools when the Glee Club is disbanded. Unique returns during the sixth season to help and support Coach Beiste with his decision to go through with a sex reassignment surgery. Newell was a runner-up in The Glee Project's first season, and his prize was a two-episode arc on Glee. A possibility for his eventual character was described during a Project episode as "the lovechild of Kurt and Mercedes". In addition to his second full appearance in "Nationals", he also appears briefly in the episode "Props".

In the fourth-season premiere, Unique transfers to McKinley High and joins New Directions. She begins presenting as a girl in that episode during school hours, despite the pressure she experiences from classmates to appear in male attire. Though some staff or students at McKinley do not recognize Unique for the woman she is, others are more accepting. In the fifth episode, "The Role You Were Born to Play", she tries out for and is cast in the female role of Rizzo for the school musical, Grease, but Sue Sylvester informs her parents in the following episode, "Glease", and they pull her from the show. Later in the season (starting from the episode "Feud"), she chats with her crush Ryder Lynn (Blake Jenner) as a blonde girl named Katie to create a connection between them. In the last episode of the season – "All or Nothing", Ryder finds out that Unique is actually Katie and because of that leaves the glee club. In "The End of Twerk", Unique's problems using the school restrooms are revealed and Mr. Schuester makes a deal with Sue that Unique can have a key to one of the private unisex teachers' restrooms and the glee club will stop twerking. She is later transferred to another school by Sue Sylvester as she wants to remove all the remaining members of Glee Club in the school. Unique returns in Season 6 to support Coach Beiste after his Transgender operation and she is seen in the last performance briefly on stage with Ryder and Joe.

=== Ryder Lynn ===
(Main Season 5; Recurring Season 4; Guest Season 6) Ryder Lynn is played by Blake Jenner, the winner of The Glee Project's second season. He makes his first appearance in the fifth episode of season four. He is a sophomore student at McKinley High School and plays football. Finn notices something special about him and encourages Ryder to audition for the school's upcoming production of Grease. Ryder tries out with a duet with Finn and gets chosen as the lead for the musical alongside Marley Rose (Melissa Benoist). Before the production begins, he finds Marley trying to make herself vomit in the bathroom. He helps her with her self-esteem issues and kisses her as Jake Puckerman (Jacob Artist) looks on. Ryder joins the glee club in the episode Dynamic Duets and romantic tension builds between him and Marley. Jake and Ryder start competing for Marley's affection. Finn wants their rivalry to end and he gives them the assignment to sing a duet together. The duet ends in another fight between them and Finn asks them to reveal their greatest fear to each other. When Jake gives Ryder a note with his fear written on it, Ryder asks him to be a man and say it face to face. When Jake reveals his fear, Ryder backs out. Jake tells him to be a man as well, and Ryder admits he asked Jake to say it out loud because he couldn't read what the note said. Jake tells Finn about this and Finn convinces Ryder to do a test to see what's wrong with him. The test proves that Ryder is dyslexic. He is directed to a professional and begins treatment to improve his studying. Later, when Jake is picked on, Ryder stands up for him and thanks Jake for helping him with his problem and the two start a friendship. When Jake and Marley begin dating, Ryder struggles with his feelings for her. However, valuing his friendship with Jake and Marley's happiness, Ryder decides to suppress his feelings and be happy for them. In the episode I Do, Ryder helps Jake plan a Valentine's week for Marley, coming up with romantic ideas and when Jake says that he's counting on having sex with Marley, Ryder says she isn't ready for that. Marley later thanks Ryder for his romantic gestures, saying she knew he was behind them and Ryder ends up kissing her. He later apologizes to both Jake and Marley, saying it was inappropriate.

In the episode Feud, Ryder has an online love interest named Katie, whom he shares all his secrets with, only to find out he's being catfished. He later finds out that "Katie" is someone in the glee club when he calls the number while being in the choir room and the phone goes off. In the episode Lights Out, Ryder confides in the glee club and tells them he was molested by his female babysitter when he was 11 years old and he has trouble trusting people because of it. Some of the guys think that's awesome and they say he shouldn't feel ashamed. Later in the episode, Kitty (Becca Tobin) tells Ryder she understands how he feels because she went through a similar situation and the two bond. Kitty starts to like Ryder and he says they could try being together once he figures out who "Katie" is. Kitty is hurt and tells him no. In the season finale All or Nothing, Ryder demands to know who is catfishing him and Unique later reveals herself. Ryder is furious and announces he is leaving the New Directions after Regionals.

In season five, Ryder returns to the New Directions, contrary to his statement at the end of the previous season. Ryder continues to pursue Marley, and even goes on a date with her following her breakup with Jake in the episode "Movin' Out". However, Marley dumps him at the end of the episode and little is shown of their development until nationals, when Ryder and Jake decide to help her go farther with her songwriting.

=== Jake Puckerman ===
(Recurring Season 4; Main Season 5; Guest Season 6) Jacob "Jake" Puckerman (Jacob Artist) is a new McKinley High student who first appears in the fourth-season premiere, "The New Rachel". He is a younger half-brother of Puck, whom he has never met. He auditions for New Directions, but when he is stopped midway through his song, Jake is infuriated and deliberately knocks over a music stand. He is not admitted to the glee club, but when director Will Schuester discovers that Jake is related to Puck, he personally invites Jake to join New Directions, telling Jake that he is talented, and he thinks joining will help him as it did Puck, but Jake declines. In the following episode, "Britney 2.0", Will arranges a surprise meeting between the half brothers, and after Puck advises him to join the glee club, Jake does so. Though there are signs that he and new club member Marley Rose are interested in one another, she is upset to learn he is dating cheerleader Kitty (Becca Tobin). Jake soon breaks up with Kitty, but he has a rival for Marley in football player Ryder Lynn. The two of them come to blows over her in the choir room, and are assigned to share their deepest fears with one another by Finn, who is directing the club while Will is in Washington. Jake eventually admits that he has never felt he belonged anywhere, being mixed-race and Jewish. Ryder in turn confesses that he has trouble reading, and the two soon become friends. Puck invites Jake to spend Christmas vacation with him in California; the two half brothers bond further, and Puck decides to move back to Ohio. They arrange a Christmas Day dinner with their two mothers, who have never met before, and the two women—initially hostile—come to an understanding. Marley asks Jake to the school's Sadie Hawkins dance and he accepts. Kitty tries to get Jake to take her instead, offering sex as the reward, but Puck draws her off. Jake and Marley attend the dance and become a couple after Jake agrees to Marley's request that they take it slow and that he not also see other girls. In the 5th season, Jake cheats on Marley with Bree, a cheerleader, and he and Marley break up. After the glee club was disbanded he along with the other new glee kids (except for Kitty) were transferred to other schools. He later appears in the final episode with everyone singing "I Lived".

=== Marley Rose ===
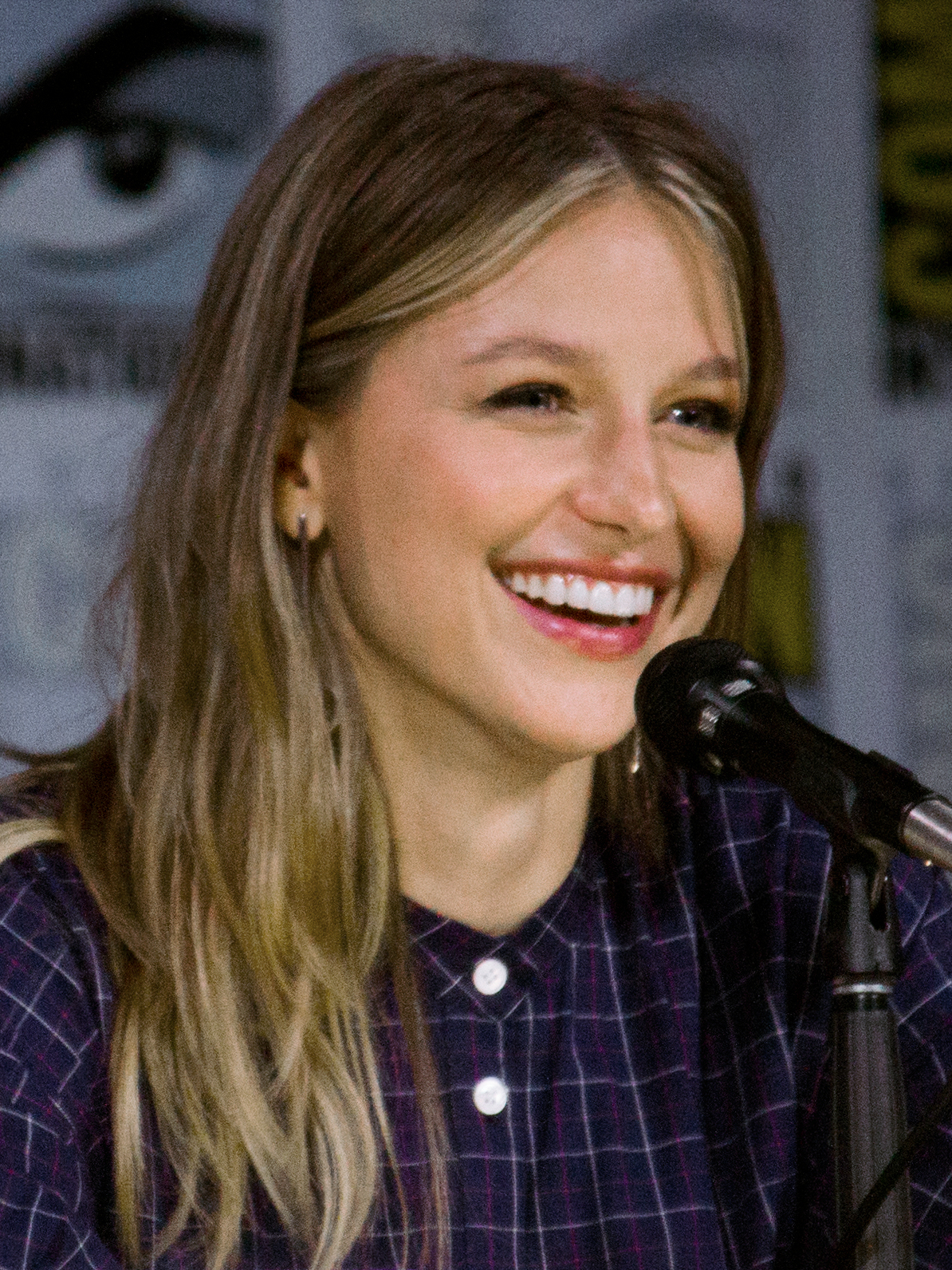
Melissa Benoist portrays Marley Rose.

(Main Season 5; Recurring Season 4) Marley Rose (Melissa Benoist) is a transfer student to McKinley High who first appears in "The New Rachel", the fourth-season premiere episode. She comes from a low-income family, her mother, Millie Rose, works at the school's cafeteria and is morbidly obese. Marley is initially introduced as a shy, sweet, intelligent "wallflower" who was frequently bullied and an outcast at her previous schools. Once she joins the glee club, she forms friendships with the other students in the club. Marley is the only one of the many students who auditioned at the beginning of the school year to be immediately accepted into New Directions. Her goal is to become a singer on the radio, rather than aiming for Broadway. She is attracted to Jake Puckerman, who is also new at McKinley, but although the attraction seems mutual, she is upset to discover he is dating Kitty, a cheerleader and popular girl. Jake eventually breaks up with Kitty because she mistreats Marley. Marley auditions for the school's production of the musical Grease along with Wade "Unique" Adams, with whom she has formed a friendship, and is cast in the lead role of Sandy. In the episode "Glease", Kitty, who had been the other candidate for Sandy, convinces Marley that she is genetically predisposed to be overweight by secretly taking in her costumes, and that she needs to induce vomit in order to maintain a desirable weight. Ryder, who plays the male lead Danny, finds Marley trying to vomit in the bathroom, and tries to convince her it's a bad idea; he ends up kissing her backstage as Jake looks on. Jake and Ryder briefly compete for Marley's affections, but she chooses Jake when Kitty convinces her that Ryder called off their date because of her weight when he was really seeing a dyslexia specialist, and they subsequently begin dating. Her bulimia gets worse, and she passes out on stage during Sectionals competition during New Directions' first number; when the glee club leaves the stage to get her first aid, the Dalton Academy Warblers are declared the winners, but they are later disqualified and New Directions gets to go on.

She and Jake are an official couple by the episode "Naked". Ryder helps Jake with ideas for Valentine's Day gifts for Marley, and at Will and Emma's wedding on Valentine's Day, she and Jake think about going "all the way", but Marley decides she isn't ready. Ryder, whose gift ideas were so successful because he'd fallen in love with Marley himself, kisses her when she thanks him for helping Jake with the presents. She tells Jake, which temporarily strains their relationship, and nearly ends Jake's friendship with Ryder. Finn, who had held the glee club together after Marley's fainting had almost ended it, has to leave New Directions when Will and he are at loggerheads. Marley goes to thank him as he's packing up, and when he says he'll miss teaching them, tells him he's a good teacher, and should get a teaching degree. By this time, Kitty has stopped sabotaging Marley and trying to undermine her confidence; in "Shooting Star", while the glee club is locked up in the choir room after gunshots are heard, Kitty breaks down and admits that she altered Marley's Sandy costumes. After the shooting incident, Marley decides to openly pursue her songwriting, which she had kept secret to that point, and in "Sweet Dreams" two of her songs are performed. A third, "All or Nothing", is performed at Regionals in the fourth-season finale, and New Directions wins the competition. In "The End of Twerk", Marley discovers that Jake had cheated on her with one of the cheerleaders, Bree, and breaks up with him. After the glee club was disbanded because of the loss in the nationals competition, she and the other glee club new kids (except for Kitty) were transferred to another school. She does not return for the rest of the series, though mentioned by Kitty that since she and her friends were transferred, she lost contact with her and maybe the rest of the glee club.

=== Kitty Wilde ===
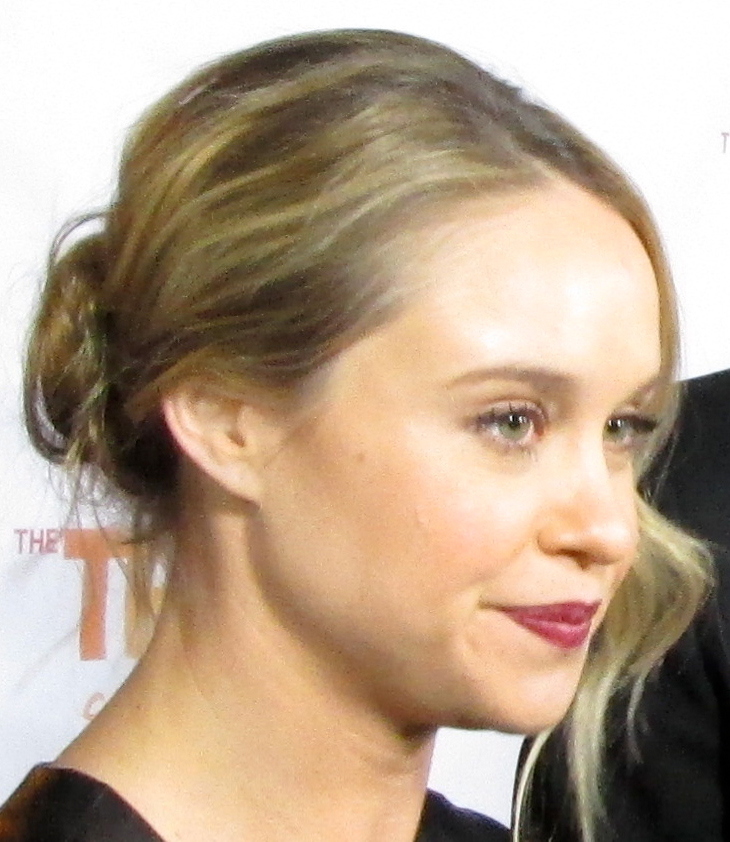
Becca Tobin

(Main Season 5; Recurring Season 4 and Season 6) Kitty Wilde (Becca Tobin) is introduced as a new McKinley High cheerleader in "The New Rachel". Kitty is one of the very popular students, and is attracted to Jake Puckerman (Jacob Artist) and starts dating him in "Britney 2.0". He stops dating her in "The Break Up". Kitty is unhappy with losing Jake, and with his attraction to Marley Rose; when Marley is favored to win the role of Sandy the school musical Grease, Kitty decides to audition for the role herself, and predicts that Marley will start to gain large amounts of weight to become like her obese mother, who works in the McKinley cafeteria. When Marley is cast as Sandy—Kitty gets the small role of Patty Simcox—Kitty secretly takes in Marley's costumes, making Marley think she is gaining weight, and gives her advice about purging, which starts Marley on the road to bulimia.

After Grease, Kitty joins New Directions in "Dynamic Duets", and when last year's graduates of the glee club—which won a Nationals championship—return to mentor the new members prior to Sectionals competition, Kitty is mentored by her idol, former head cheerleader Quinn Fabray. Kitty, while sometimes giving Marley good advice about being more assertive, continues undermining her confidence about her weight to the point that Marley faints during Sectionals competition, causing New Directions to be disqualified. After making another try at Jake, she begins dating Jake's older half-brother, Puck. Kitty, though still acerbic, becomes more sympathetic to the other glee club members, admitting that she considers everyone in New Directions her friends, and that—since the glee club's disqualification has been reversed—she wants to win a Nationals championship. During the "Shooting Star" episode, while the choir room is locked down after shots are heard, Kitty confesses to Marley about her Grease costume sabotage; she tearfully apologizes, and is forgiven.

In "Lights Out", she reveals to Ryder, who had been sexually abused when eleven, that she too had been sexually abused in sixth grade by her friend's older brother at a sleepover. Sadly, when she told people what happened, nobody believed her. Furthermore, she was ostracized by her friends, eventually pushing her to switch schools. Kitty later intervenes after Artie Abrams is accepted to film school but has decided not to attend, and he ends up deciding to go after all. New Directions wins its Regionals competition, and is set to compete at Nationals.

== Supporting characters ==
=== McKinley High students ===
==== Alistair ====
Alistair (Finneas O'Connell) is a McKinley High student who transfers in during the sixth season of the show and was first introduced in "Child Star" as a friend of Roderick who Spencer (Marshall Williams) is smitten with. Spencer convinces Alistair to join New Directions, and the two of them become a couple. New Directions ultimately goes on to become the National Show Choir Champions.

==== Azimio ====
Azimio (James Earl, initially credited as "James Earl, III") is a McKinley High football player who was first introduced in the episode "Mash-Up", giving Finn Hudson grief over being in the glee club. Azimio is one of the school's bullies, and friends with teammate and fellow bully Dave Karofsky. Although he is usually seen harassing members of the glee club, Azimio was the first of the football players in "The Sue Sylvester Shuffle" to agree to perform in the halftime show the night of the championship game in order to be allowed to play in the second half, saying he wanted to win the game because it would mean so much to his father. Although he has typically been seen in tandem with Karofsky, he was featured on his own late in the second season, first as part of a "heckling club" organized by Sue to disrupt the glee club's benefit concert in "A Night of Neglect", during which he states that he writes devastating anonymous commentary in NCIS and CSI: Miami chat rooms, and then as one of Sue's staffers for the school newspaper when she revives The Muckraker in "Rumours" to spread damaging rumors about New Directions members. Karofsky, having given up bullying, confronts Azimio in "Born This Way" about his own bullying. Azimio appears once in the third season in "Asian F"; he is still a member of the football team.

==== Jacob Ben Israel ====
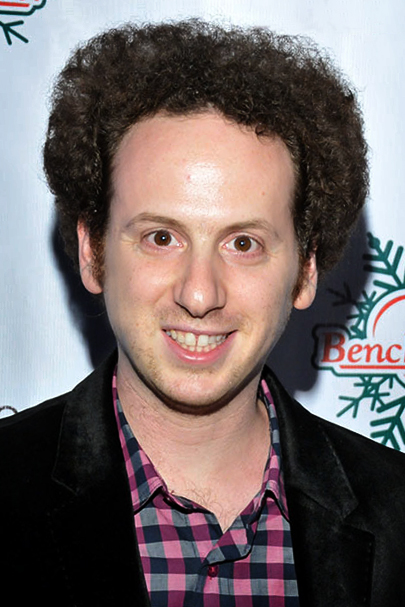
Josh Sussman portrays Jacob Ben Israel.

Jacob Ben Israel (Josh Sussman) is the vain, creepy editor of the school newspaper, in addition to running his own gossip blog. He has been compared in the media to Perez Hilton and Gossip Girl. Jacob has a crush on Rachel, who feels uneasy around him but relies on him for positive reviews. Jacob however has a crush on Rachel so he can have the best reviews even if it means over stepping boundaries, and blackmailing her to give him bras and panties. Although he attends Celibacy Club meetings, Jacob behaves in a sexually forward manner toward Rachel, threatening to sabotage her musical career unless she shows him her bra, blackmailing her for a pair of her panties in the episode "Throwdown" and masturbating over video footage of her in "Britney/Brittany". He briefly joins New Directions in order to fill the membership quota for sectionals, as a temporary replacement for Finn. Although he does not sing in the competition, he remains with the club throughout the remainder of the episode, helping them to listen in on the judges. Jacob also does polling, and his numbers are frequently mentioned during campaigns for prom king and queen, and in elections for student government and class president.

The second, third, and fourth seasons of Glee all open with a documentary made by Jacob, focusing on the recent happenings at McKinley and the glee club in particular. In addition to helping viewers catch up with the plot as the season starts, the first of these, from the season two premiere, "Audition", was used by the Glee producers to directly address media criticism of the first season.

==== Rory Flanagan ====
Rory Flanagan (Damian McGinty) is an Irish foreign exchange student who is living with Brittany's family. Rory first appeared in the fourth episode of the third season, titled "Pot o' Gold". Brittany was initially convinced that Rory was a magical leprechaun whom only she could see and was there to grant her three wishes. Additionally, Rory is a fan of Finn Hudson, and is persuaded by Finn to join New Directions—he auditions with the song "Take Care of Yourself" in a performance characterized by Rachel as "magical". Rory looks up to Finn, and tries to defend Finn when Santana insults him, only to get his own share of insults from her. He is given his first lead vocal in a Hall & Oates mash-up, singing one verse in a duet with Tina. The character of Rory was created for McGinty after he won a recurring role for seven episodes on Glee as a contestant on The Glee Project. The idea of his character interacting with Brittany was first broached in the penultimate episode of The Glee Project, with the judges speculating that Brittany would not be able to understand a word the character said due to his Irish accent. McGinty was retained as a recurring cast member past his initial seven-episode prize through the end of the third season, but is not at McKinley as the fourth season begins. He does appear in a fantasy dream sequence during that season's Christmas episode, "Glee, Actually", as Artie's guardian angel.

==== Sugar Motta ====
Sugar Motta (Vanessa Lengies) is a student at McKinley. Her father Al is the wealthy owner of a piano business who donates three repossessed pianos to the glee club in "The Purple Piano Project", the episode in which she first appears. Sugar has self-diagnosed Asperger syndrome, which she uses to explain why she can say whatever she wants. After the glee club performs in the school cafeteria in the hopes of recruiting new students, Sugar shows up to audition, telling the club that they're terrible but she's awesome and will be their new star. Her audition is a stunningly horrendous rendition of "Big Spender", and she becomes the first person who fails to get into New Directions after auditioning. In "I Am Unicorn", her father makes a huge donation to the school to set up a second glee club that will feature Sugar as the star, and recruits Shelby Corcoran to direct it. When Mercedes, Santana and Brittany join, Sugar assumes they'll be her backup singers, but Santana openly tells her she's not a good singer, and she should stay out of their way, at which point Sugar admits that she "just wanted to be on the winning team for once". Sugar has subsequently been seen dancing and singing in several polished performances, indicating that she has greatly improved. After the Troubletones place second at Sectionals, Shelby resigns as director, and the Troubletones are told they are all welcome in New Directions, Sugar accompanies Mercedes, Santana and Brittany when they return, and sings "We Are Young" with the group. Her first in-tune solo was in "Summer Nights" in "Yes/No". In "Heart", she gives Will money to pay for costumes and makeup for Regionals, and throws a big Valentine's Day party. Artie and Rory compete to be her date at the party, and Rory is chosen after his claim that he is being deported at the end of the school year wins her sympathy. Sugar remains with New Directions at their Nationals victory, and returns the next year to continue with the glee club at Sectionals and Regionals, but has not appeared in the fifth season. Sugar returns in the sixth-season episode "A Wedding", performing "I'm So Excited" with Mercedes, Santana, Brittany, Blaine's mom, Santana and Brittany's moms and Kurt's stepmom.

According to Lengies, Sugar's self-diagnosed Aspergers is part of her character. She said that it was difficult to sing poorly on purpose, especially with piano accompaniment. Sugar's debut was praised by Salon's Matt Zoller Seitz, who said of the new addition to McKinley, "She's awful. She's also an entitled little snot... She's a great character, and I hope we haven't seen the last of her." Entertainment Weekly's Abby West praised Sugar, and with Sue otherwise occupied hoped to see more of Sugar as "a thorn in the Glee club's side". On the other hand, TV Guide "jeered" Sugar, calling her "an off-key addition to the cast". The A.V. Club's Emily St. James concurred, and said of "I Am Unicorn", "Sugar continues to be one of my least favorite new characters in ages". The Huffington Post named Sugar Motta one of the "Worst TV Characters" in 2012.

==== Joe Hart ====
Joe Hart (Samuel Larsen) first appears as a new transfer student to McKinley High in the third-season episode "Heart". He is a Christian, wears his hair in dreadlocks, and has been home schooled until that point; he joins the "God Squad" club, whose other members include three who are members of the glee club: Mercedes, Sam, and Quinn. After Quinn is in an automobile accident and becomes a wheelchair user, he prays for her, and also helps her with her physical therapy; she, in return, recruits him into the glee club. Joe finds himself having feelings for Quinn and turns to Sam for advice, since the feelings are partially physical, which is frowned on by his faith. New Directions wins Nationals, and Quinn graduates. He continues at McKinley and in New Directions in the show's fourth season, and performs in both Sectionals and Regionals competitions, but has not appeared in the fifth season; Larsen cut his trademark dreadlocks after fourth-season filming ended. Joe appears again in season six in "The Rise and Fall of Sue Sylvester" and accuses Sue of having cut off his dreadlocks.

Larsen was one of the two winners of The Glee Project's first season, and his prize was a seven-episode arc on Glee. Like his character, Larsen is Christian, and had thought "being Christian and trying to make it in this business as opposites working against each other" and that "you have to be very secure in your faith to approach this business". He was therefore surprised—and thrilled—when his religious beliefs seemed to interest and inspire Glee's Ryan Murphy during an episode of The Glee Project.

==== Jane Hayward ====
Jane Hayward (Samantha Marie Ware) is a student at McKinley, member of New Directions, and a former student at Dalton Academy. Jane is implied to come from a wealthy family, and was previously at the lowest performing school in Ohio before her father sued Dalton and made her the first ever female student to attend there. Jane asks Blaine Anderson if she can become a Warbler, but even after a successful audition, the Warbler council voted against her, making her ultimately transfer to McKinley to become a member of the New Directions.

==== Becky Jackson ====
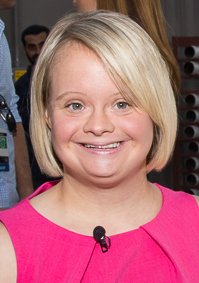
Lauren Potter portrays Becky Jackson.

Rebecca Faye "Becky" Jackson (Lauren Potter, narration as Queen Elizabeth II provided by an uncredited Helen Mirren) is a member of the Cheerios with Down syndrome, who becomes a sidekick to Sue. Becky appears in three episodes of the first season, "Wheels", "The Power of Madonna" and "Home" and returns in the second season as cheerleading coach Sue Sylvester's assistant. Becky does everything Sue tells her to do, including heckling the glee club in "A Night of Neglect", though her honest reactions to events have an effect on Sue. Becky is briefly kicked off the cheerleading squad by Sue in "Funeral" after Sue's sister, who also has Down Syndrome, dies; Becky asks to join the glee club, but she is told that it's too late in the show choir season, though she is offered a spot next year. Sue then apologizes to Becky, reinstates her, and tells Becky she'll be captain of the Cheerios in the fall. To Becky's dismay, when the third season commences she is not the sole captain, but is made co-captain with Santana. She also assists Sue with her Congressional campaign, though Sue loses the race. In the episode "Yes/No", she decides she wants Artie to be her boyfriend. She asks him out on a date, and while they do have a good time, he balks at a more serious relationship, to her great disappointment. Sue comforts her afterward. When Becky fails to get enough nominations to be on the ballot for senior class prom queen, she is very upset, and joins the anti-prom set up by Rachel and Kurt. She wins a game of strip poker with Puck after the others go to the prom after all, and he crowns the two of them the anti-prom king and queen. They then go to the real prom, and she helps him spike Sue's punch bowl. Becky is still a student at McKinley in the fourth season, still a Cheerio, and still Sue's aide-de-camp. In "Feud", Sue names her Cheerios co-captain again, along with the newly recruited Blaine Anderson. Becky is frightened in "Shooting Star" about having to leave McKinley when she graduates, so she brings her father's gun to school as protection, but it accidentally goes off when Sue tries to get Becky to give her the gun. Sue takes the blame for having the gun, which she gets rid of, and is fired by Principal Figgins. Becky wants Sue to come back to McKinley, and later misbehaves in "Lights Out" so that Roz Washington, who has taken over as coach of the Cheerios, brings her to the principal's office, as she wants to tell Figgins something important. According to Sue, when she returns as principal at the beginning of the fifth season, Becky did confess to having brought the gun to school, and is suspended for one month. Artie later encourages Becky to go to college, and Becky visits the University of Cincinnati. She graduates in the second part of the 100th episode, "New Directions". She returns in the final season during homecoming, and in the series finale, she become the head of the secret service for the vice president Sue.

Potter is a member of the Down's Syndrome Association of Los Angeles, and was contacted about auditioning through the association's in-house talent agency, Hearts and Hands. Fourteen actresses auditioned for the role, which Potter deemed "a great experience" to perform.

==== Dave Karofsky ====
David "Dave" Karofsky (Max Adler) is introduced as a bully and McKinley High athlete in the episode "Mash-Up". He is a member of the hockey team who slushies Finn, but by "Theatricality" he's on the football team with his friend and fellow bully Azimio (James Earl); they regularly target members of New Directions. In the episode "Never Been Kissed", written to tackle the issue of LGBT youth bullying, Karofsky kisses Kurt during an argument. He later warns Kurt not to tell anyone about it, threatening to kill him if he does. He is expelled for his death threat, but allowed to return by the school board as no physical violence was witnessed—and Kurt had not revealed the kiss. He is briefly kicked off the football team with the other non-glee club members in "The Sue Sylvester Shuffle", but they return to perform the championship game's half-time show mashup of "Thriller/Heads Will Roll" with the club, and ultimately win the game. In the episode "Born This Way", after being blackmailed by Santana, he issues an apology to Kurt at a group meeting involving their fathers, Principal Figgins and Will. In "Prom Queen", when Karofsky wins prom king and Kurt, shockingly, wins prom queen, the two walk onto the floor for the traditional king and queen dance, but Karofsky is unable to come out as Kurt suggests, and leaves. He next appears in the third-season episode "The First Time". He has transferred to another high school from McKinley for his senior year; he sees Kurt in a gay bar, and tells Kurt he has become a regular there and feels accepted. He is later outed at his new school and bullied so mercilessly that he attempts to commit suicide but is saved by his father; Kurt visits him in the hospital and they agree to become friends.

Adler had previously questioned his character's motivations, but was surprised by the scene in which Karofsky kisses Kurt. He commented that he was "glad to represent such a large group of people", expanding: "I've gotten so many messages from people all around the world these last couple of days thanking me because either they are Karofsky, they were Karofsky or they know a Karofsky." During the second season, show co-creator Ryan Murphy noted that "Glee is by nature optimistic and I think a character like Karofsky could turn to booze or pills or alcohol and kill themselves or do something dark. But I also love Max and I love that character and I sorta want that character to have a happy ending."

==== Madison McCarthy ====
Madison McCarthy (Laura Dreyfuss) is a student at McKinley and a member of the New Directions. She is first introduced in "Homecoming" alongside her twin brother Mason. The two of them are shown to be incredibly close and are referred to by Kitty Wilde as the "creepy incest twins". She and her brother successfully audition for the New Directions and become the third and fourth members of the newly reformed club.

==== Mason McCarthy ====
Mason McCarthy (Billy Lewis Jr.) is a student at McKinley and a member of the New Directions. He is first introduced in "Homecoming" alongside his twin sister Madison. The two of them are shown to be incredibly close and are referred to by Kitty Wilde as the "creepy incest twins". He and his sister successfully audition for the New Directions and become the third and fourth members of the newly reformed club. Later, during "Jagged Little Tapestry" he performs a duet with Jane, though it is negatively received by Kurt, which inspires the two to do better.

==== Myron Muskovitz ====
Myron Muskovitz (Josie Totah, credited as J.J. Totah) is the nephew of School Superintendent Bob Harris (Christopher Cousins) who was first introduced in "Child Star", when he has New Directions serve as his opening act at his bar mitzvah. He transfers to McKinley High shortly thereafter so he can join New Directions, and stays with them as they become the National Show Choir Champions.

==== Spencer Porter ====
Spencer Porter (Marshall Williams) is a football player and student at McKinley. He makes his first appearance in "Loser Like Me" and offends Rachel when he calls a fellow football player a "whiny homo" until Sam reveals that Spencer is actually gay. He describes himself as a "post-modern gay teen". He is approached by Kurt Hummel during "Homecoming" about the possibility of joining the New Directions, but he declines, saying he shouldn't have to join a stupid glee club just because he is openly gay. Spencer eventually joins the New Directions and competes with them at Sectionals, and later at Regionals and Nationals, where they win.

==== Roderick Meeks ====
Roderick Meeks (Noah Guthrie) is a senior at McKinley and a member of the New Directions. He is introduced in the season 6 episode "Homecoming", when Rachel Berry hears the voice of someone singing and attempts to recruit them to the New Directions, but is unsure of where the sound is coming from. In voiceover, Roderick talks about how he is a transfer student and that music is his only friend and it wouldn't hurt to make some real friends, just as someone places a "wide load" sticker on his back. It is later revealed he is the voice Rachel heard singing, and later becomes the first official member of the newly reformed New Directions after a successful audition of "Mustang Sally". He remains in New Directions through the season's final episode, and they win the National Show Choir Championship. His surname is never mentioned during the course of the show; however, Guthrie stated that the character's surname was "Meeks" in a post on his Twitter account.

==== Matt Rutherford ====
Matt Rutherford (Dijon Talton) is a football player who joins New Directions in the fourth episode, "Preggers", and appears for the remainder of the first season of Glee. He does not return in the second season; Will says that he transferred to another school. Talton has called Matt a typical football player with a talent for singing and dancing, who always wanted to perform but felt forced to choose between performing and being "cool". Talton explained that Finn joining the glee club made it more acceptable for Matt to be honest with himself about what he wanted to do, and that he is becoming more comfortable being in the glee club, "what it stands for, how it makes him feel". He said the following about Matt's characterization:

I wanted Matt to be fun and just enjoy the moment [...] I think nowadays too many kids are concerned with people's opinions and judgments, and how that's going to affect them. At the end of the day the only thing that matters is if you're happy and if your own judgment for yourself is a good one. If you can look in the mirror and say, "I'm Matt Rutherford, or I'm Dijon Talton, and I'm happy with it," that's all that's important. That's what I wanted to bring to Matt.

— Dijon Talton, Starry Constellation Magazine

==== Lauren Zizes ====
Lauren Zizes (Ashley Fink) is the McKinley High AV club president and a state champion in Greco-Roman wrestling. During the first season, Kurt tells his father that Lauren's parents had to sue the school district to get Lauren a spot on the wrestling team. Lauren has an acerbic personality and is admired by Puck for being "a bigger bad-ass" than he is. She is overweight and has a love of candy, specifically Cadbury Creme Eggs. Lauren has occasionally been seen dressing in the Goth style and is a fan of the Twilight book series. She is seen in the episode "The Substitute", in which she is taken advantage of by Sue Sylvester to spread a disease, which Sue calls "loud bisexual primate flu", to a number of students and faculty, namely Will Schuester and Principal Figgins. She joins New Directions in the episode "Special Education", enabling the club to meet the member quota for sectionals. Early in her tenure, she claims that show choir is stupid, but on several subsequent occasions she is seen enjoying singing and performing in the background. She performs "I Know What Boys Like", her first solo, in "Comeback". She campaigns with Puck for prom king and queen, though they both lose, and the two are still a couple at the end of the second season. However, after the glee club finishes twelfth at Nationals, Lauren concludes that being in New Directions is hurting her credibility, so she quits the group and breaks up with Puck at the start of the new school year. She returns in the fourth season's "Sadie Hawkins" as a member of Tina's "too young to be bitter" group, but regains her confidence, dances with Joe Hart, and announces that she's applied to go to Harvard on a wrestling scholarship. Although being credited as guest starring in season 2 she appears in 17/22 episodes.

==== Other McKinley High students ====
In the pilot episode, Pilot, Ben Bledsoe appears as Hank Saunders, a member of the McKinley glee club before its transformation into New Directions, singing “Where is Love?” from Oliver!. Sandy Ryerson is said to have behaved sexually inappropriately towards him, leading to Sandy's dismissal and a restructuring of the glee club. For unknown reasons, Hank does not audition to re-join the club, unlike Rachel, who does.

In the season one episode "Ballad", Sarah Drew makes a guest appearance as Suzy Pepper, a senior with "an insane, absurd, psychotic crush on Mr. Schuester". Drew described Suzy as "kind of stalkerish and creepy", but ultimately redeemable. James Poniewozik of Time commented positively on Suzy's characterization, observing that while she appeared to be a "throwaway dorky-girl stereotype", she was "fleshed-out as a person", a feat he doubted the series would have been capable of earlier in the season.

In season three, LaMarcus Tinker portrays Shane Tinsley, a new love interest for Mercedes and a "massive linebacker for the McKinley Titans". Rock Anthony appears as Rick "The Stick" Nelson, a hockey player who slushies Finn and runs for senior class president against Kurt and Brittany. In the season five premiere, a new McKinley cheerleader and "mean girl", Bree, played by Erinn Westbrook, is introduced as a nemesis for the glee club.

==== William McKinley Jazz Ensemble ====
The William McKinley Jazz Ensemble frequently accompanies New Directions in their on-screen musical numbers. While this student ensemble was introduced in the pilot episode, with numerous appearances throughout the series, none of these instrumentalists were given character names. The only instrumentalist to receive an acting credit is Scott Henson (as "Scott T. Henson, guitarist") for having a line of dialogue in "A Very Glee Christmas".

Regular members of the group include a drummer played by John Lock and a bassist played by Scott Henson (later a member of the real band Nightmare and the Cat), both introduced in the pilot; a guitarist played by Spencer Conley in the first two seasons, first seen in "Throwdown"; a guitarist played by Derik Nelson in seasons three to five, replacing Conley in season three opener "The Purple Piano Project"; and a keyboardist played by Mark Nilan Jr. in the first two seasons, who first appears in "The Power of Madonna".

John Lock is frequently shown waiting for Finn Hudson to relinquish the drums to him, and Spencer Conley was featured in amongst the glee club females in their performance of the "Start Me Up / Livin' on a Prayer" mash-up in "Never Been Kissed". Lock and Henson temporarily abandoned their instruments to sing and dance with New Directions for Sectionals competition in the episode "Hold On to Sixteen". Henson, Lock and Nelson appear, with the Jazz Ensemble, in the flashforward to 2020, accompanying the collected cast in the final performance of the show's final episode.

Other student instrumentalists regularly accompany New Directions, alone or with the Jazz Ensemble, including string and horn players, additional guitarists, keyboard players and percussionists, and a harpist.

=== McKinley High faculty ===
==== Lillian Adler ====
Lillian Adler (Jane Galloway Heitz) was the glee club director until 1997 when she died of unknown causes. She was the director of glee club when Will Schuester was a member. Adler first appears in the uncut version of the premiere episode, "Pilot", and her memorial plaque serves as inspiration for Will to take over as glee club director. Her plaque was viewed during the course of the series by Will and other glee club members as a further source of inspiration. The plaque resided in the choir room until the episode "100", when it was moved to the auditorium. Adler's final appearance is seen in a flashback by Will to the pilot episode in the series finale "Dreams Come True". The last scene of the series showed Adler's plaque alongside a plaque of the rededication to the auditorium and a memorial plaque for Finn Hudson.

==== Shelby Corcoran ====
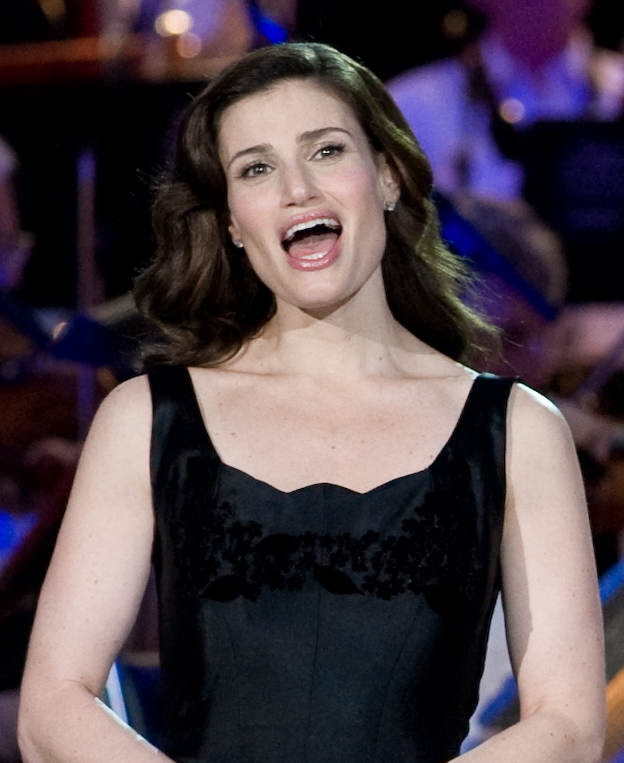
Idina Menzel portrays Shelby Corcoran.

Shelby Corcoran (Idina Menzel) is the coach of rival glee club Vocal Adrenaline during season one, described by Murphy as "a sort of Faye Dunaway of Network". She makes out with Will shortly after meeting him, but she resists sleeping with him when he says his divorce is not yet final and that he has just broken up with his new girlfriend, Emma. Fans had lobbied for Menzel to be cast as Rachel's biological mother, due to the strong resemblance between Menzel and Michele. In the episode "Dream On", it is revealed that Shelby is, in fact, Rachel's biological mother. She had signed a contract that stated that she could not seek out her daughter until she was eighteen. In the season one finale, "Journey to Regionals", Shelby adopts Quinn Fabray and Noah Puckerman's newborn daughter, Beth. She leaves Vocal Adrenaline before the beginning of the next school year.

Shelby returns in the second episode of season three, "I Am Unicorn", having been recruited to lead a second glee club at McKinley High by Sugar Motta's father when Sugar is refused entry into New Directions. Shelby offers to include both Quinn and Puck in Beth's life. In "Pot o' Gold", Shelby tells Puck that she is struggling at being a mother; as the episode ends, they kiss. Puck falls in love with her, but Shelby tells him in "Mash Off" that the kiss was a mistake. She compounds the mistake in "I Kissed a Girl" when she sleeps with him, and Shelby resigns from McKinley in the eighth episode, "Hold On to Sixteen". Shelby is next seen in the nineteenth episode of season four, "Sweet Dreams"; she is living in New York, and visits Rachel at NYADA.

==== Principal Figgins ====
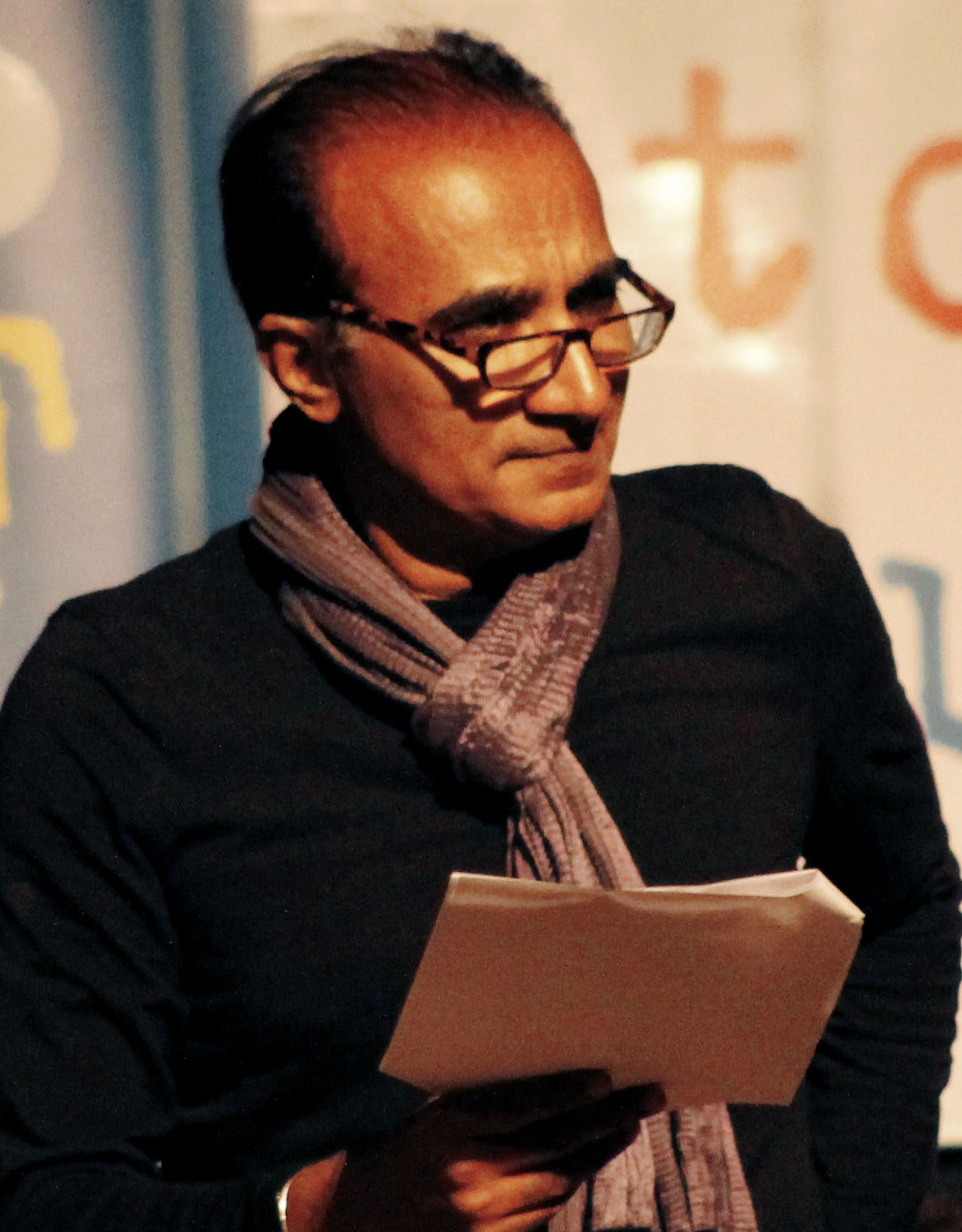
Iqbal Theba portrays Principal Figgins.

Principal Figgins (Iqbal Theba) is William McKinley High School's "stern but fair" principal. "Principal" is his real first name. Figgins allows Will to take over the school glee club; however, he insists that the students must place at Regionals in order for the club to continue. He is blackmailed by Sue for most of the first season: she uncovers internet footage of him appearing in a support stocking commercial for Mumbai Air, and she later drugs his drink and takes a compromising photograph of them in bed together. At the end of the first season, Sue ends the blackmail and persuades him to give the glee club another year. In the second season, Figgins defends the hiring of Beiste from Sue and Will. Sue then serves as Figgins's temporary replacement when he catches the flu, and succeeds in having him fired, becoming principal in his stead. She resigns in the following episode, however, and he is reinstated. He also leads the school on an anti-alcohol campaign. Near the end of the second season, he hires the glee club to perform at the school's junior prom. In the third season, he gives tenure to Emma, makes Roz Washington co-coach of the Cheerios, and names Will as Teacher of the Year. At the end of the third season, he tasks Brittany to head up Prom. In the fourth season, he deals with problems with Sue and Finn and the musical, Grease. Near the end of the fourth season, he is forced to fire Sue after she admits to bringing a gun into school and accidentally firing it. It is later revealed that Becky Jackson was the one to bring in the gun and Sue is allowed to return. In the fifth season, Sue takes over the role of Principal (after framing him) and makes Figgins the school janitor. He then takes a job as a part-time barista at the Lima Bean in the sixth season.

Although Figgins was initially conceived as White, Pakistani American actor Theba was cast in the role. He finds Figgins a challenging character to play, as it entails finding "the right mix of someone who is an authority figure but who is also very insecure about his own strengths as a person".

==== Holly Holliday ====
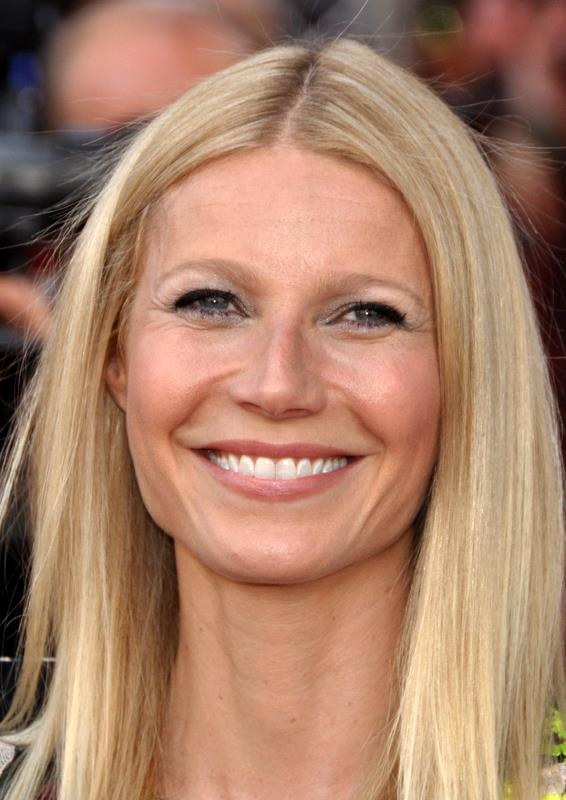
Gwyneth Paltrow portrays Holly Holliday.

Holly Holliday (Gwyneth Paltrow) is a substitute teacher at McKinley High. Her first appearance was in the second-season episode "The Substitute", when she temporarily takes over as the director of the glee club while Will Schuester is out sick. Paltrow's Glee appearance marked her first ever scripted-series guest performance. The role of Holly was created for her by series creator Ryan Murphy, a personal friend who suggested that she showcase her vocal and dancing talent ahead of the December 2010 release of the film Country Strong, in which Paltrow plays a country singer. Holly makes a return appearance in the episode "Sexy", this time subbing for McKinley's sex education teacher. In that same episode she also begins a romantic relationship with Will. Holly's third and final appearance that season is in the episode "A Night of Neglect", in which she breaks off her relationship with Will because she knows he is in love with Emma. Murphy stated at PaleyFest in March 2011 that Paltrow as Holly would be returning in season three for a series of guest appearances, but she has not appeared on Glee in the two years since that announcement.

==== Sandy Ryerson ====
Sandy Ryerson (Stephen Tobolowsky) is the former director of the McKinley High glee club. He is a bully, and a tyrant, and behaves inappropriately towards male students. Although he claims to have a girlfriend, Rachel refers to him as a "closet case", and he is fired for his inappropriate sexual behavior towards a male student. Following his firing, he becomes a drug dealer, reselling medical marijuana. When he wants to join Will's band, the Acafellas, they initially reject him for being too "creepy", but change their minds when he tells them that Josh Groban is a friend of his and will attend their next performance if Sandy is in it. While Josh does attend, he does so only to serve Sandy with a restraining order for constantly sending him inappropriate photos and messages over the internet. Colluding with Sue Sylvester to bring down New Directions, Sandy is appointed the school's arts director. Sandy appears in Rachel's music video for "Run Joey Run", playing her father, and gives Will advice about beating rival glee club Vocal Adrenaline. His behavior is often eccentric, including doll collecting, writing fan fiction about Desperate Housewives, and attempting to create a role for himself as Cleopatra in the school production of Cabaret. The casting notice for the role of Sandy read, in part, "He's gay, but covers it ... most of the time. With a pastel sweater thrown over his shoulders, Sandy is the former Glee Club teacher, who is given the axe after an episode of inappropriate touching." Tobolowsky, who plays Sandy, describes him as a humorous character who "just cannot connect with the normal world" and exists on the "outer boundary of reality". Tim Stack for Entertainment Weekly has praised Sandy as "one of the most reliable characters for great lines and laughs". In the first few episodes, it was implied heavily that Sandy was gay. The second-season episode "A Night of Neglect" confirmed this, with Sandy characterizing himself as a "predatory gay". In that episode, he joins Sue Sylvester's "League of Doom", using the codename "The Pink Dagger", but ends up donating money to support the school's academic decathlon team, spoiling Sue's plans.

==== Ken Tanaka ====
Ken Tanaka (Patrick Gallagher) was the head coach of the football team and was previously engaged to Emma. Gallagher has stated: "I think you understand where Ken comes from as they go on. You understand where the bitterness comes from, and people may start to like him a little. Ken will keep going [after Emma]. Ken will go after what he wants. The one thing Ken won't do is give up." Though Gallagher is Chinese-Irish, Ken is Japanese. Comparing himself to his character, Gallagher detailed: "I'm more like him than I care to admit. I realized I was going for what I like to think as an older version of me from years ago. I think Ken is not happy with where he is in life. I think he's still got a good heart, but there's this insecurity and bitterness piled on top of it. I think love is in Ken's head, and love for me is kind of an idealistic concept. But one thing I really respect about him is that he goes after something: He just doggedly pursues Emma. I wish I was more like that. In some ways, he's a little bit braver than I am. I mean—look at what he wears. That takes guts." Gallagher finds the character interesting, as to play the role he has to face his own "insecurities" and "bitterness". Gallagher feels that he draws much of Ken's characterization from himself, while also "channeling" his high school gym teachers. He commented: "the real challenge is to find the balance between not trying to be too funny, not trying to make it funny, just letting it be funny, and just delivering the line and letting the writing do the work for you."

He did not return for the second season, being replaced by coach Beiste as the new football coach. Principal Figgins explains that Ken had a nervous breakdown.

He is briefly seen in the season four episode "Shooting Star" as a potential match for Coach Beiste on an online dating site. It is here revealed that he is currently living in Medford, Oregon.

==== Roz Washington ====
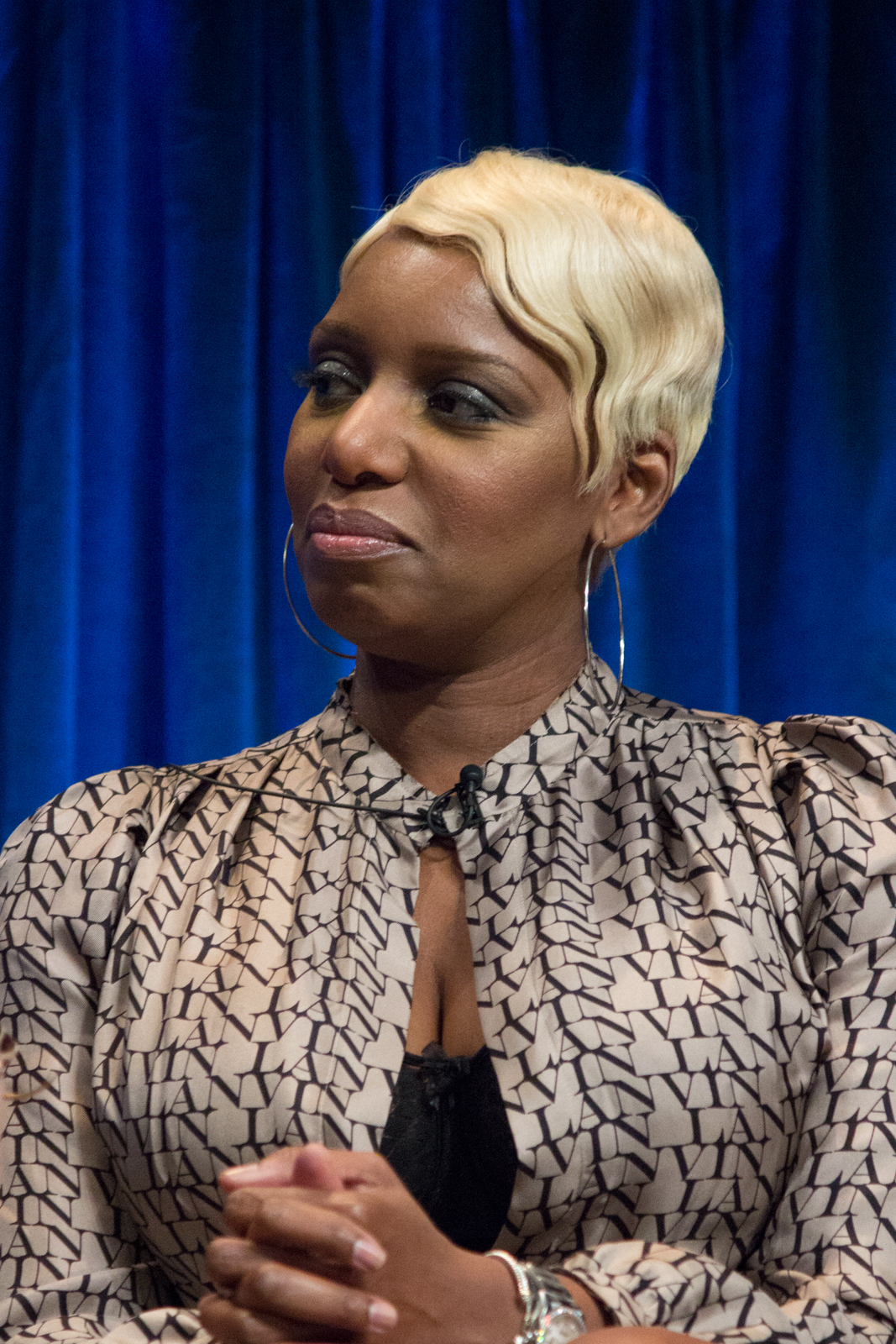
NeNe Leakes portrays Roz Washington.

Roz Washington (NeNe Leakes) was first introduced in the third-season episode "Yes/No" as McKinley High's new synchronized swim coach, a sport in which she received an Olympic bronze medal. Coach Roz appeared again in "The Spanish Teacher", during which she directs a routine for the Cheerios, to cheerleading coach Sue Sylvester's disgust. Roz manages to convince Principal Figgins to appoint her as cheerleading co-coach, which outrages Sue who doesn't want to share power, though the two team up to teach the glee club girls that spousal abuse is nothing to joke about. Sue makes a deal with Figgins: if she helps the glee club win the Nationals competition, she will regain full control of the Cheerios. The club wins Nationals, and Sue is triumphant. Roz returns late in the fourth season to take over the Cheerios after Sue is fired, and is still coach early in the fifth season after Sue returns as school principal.

The role of Roz was created by Ryan Murphy, who noted that Leakes herself was part of the inspiration for the character, from her appearances on The Celebrity Apprentice and The Real Housewives of Atlanta, and only afterward did he realize he could offer the role to Leakes herself. Ian Brennan writes most of Roz's dialogue, much as he write most of Sue's. Leakes as Roz has received mostly praise for her work. Billboard's Rae Votta said she was "arguably the best part" of "Yes/No", and after her second appearance in "The Spanish Teacher", declared that the show "should never let NeNe go". Crystal Bell of Huffington Post said of her first appearance only that Leakes "does well", but by the time of her third appearance in "Big Brother", after having praised guest star Matt Bomer, she added that "he's no NeNe Leakes, but not everyone can be that fabulous".

==== Other McKinley High faculty ====
John Lloyd Young guest stars in the episode "Acafellas" as Henri St. Pierre, "a retired wood shop teacher with an excellent singing voice". Molly Shannon appears twice during the first season as Brenda Castle, an alcoholic astronomy teacher and badminton coach who clashes with Sue. Brad Ellis has a recurring role as Brad Ellis, the pianist who accompanies New Directions, and did not show any sympathy towards the club when they lost Sectionals in 2012. Barbara Tarbuck appears in the third season as Nancy Bletheim, a geometry teacher who's been at McKinley High for 42 years, who supports Sue's congressional run. Mary Gillis plays Mrs. Hagberg, who appears in "Prom Queen" teaching home economics, in "I Am Unicorn" teaching geography, in "I Kissed a Girl" teaching math, and retires from her tenured position as a history teacher in "The Spanish Teacher", though she returns for an end-of-the-year ceremony in "Nationals". Ricky Martin portrays David Martinez, a night school Spanish teacher, in the episode "The Spanish Teacher". He replaces Will as McKinley's Spanish teacher; Will instead begins teaching history. Jean Sincere had a recurring role as the school's "Ancient Librarian" in 2010 and 2011. Phoebe Strole first appears in the fifth season as Penny Owen, a college sophomore who wants to become a nurse though she is not yet very skilled, and whom McKinley High senior Sam Evans is attracted to. Also in the fifth and sixth season, Christopher Cousins plays Superintendent Bob Harris.

=== Rival choir personnel ===
==== Sunshine Corazón ====
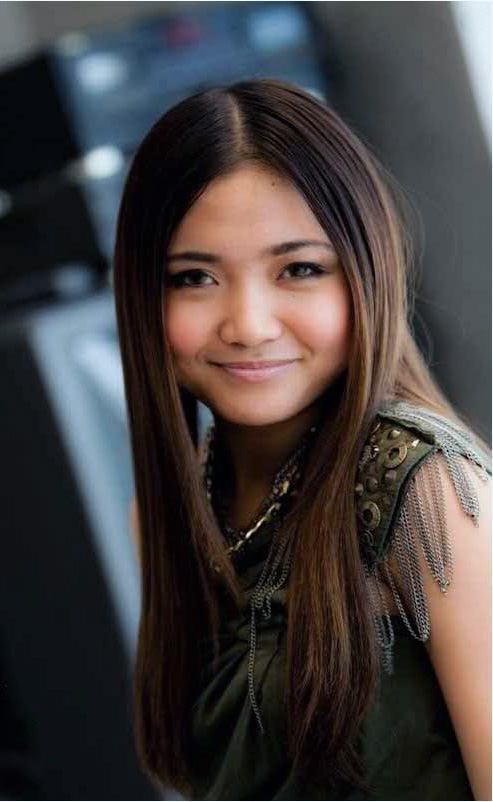
Jake Zyrus, credited as Charice Pempengco, portrays Sunshine Corazón.

Sunshine Corazón (Jake Zyrus, credited as Charice Pempengco) is a foreign exchange student from the Philippines. Rachel invites her to join the glee club after seeing Sunshine sing along to New Directions' version of "Empire State of Mind". However, when the two later sing "Telephone", Rachel feels threatened by Sunshine's singing prowess and tricks her into going to a crack house instead of the auditions. Rachel is eventually found out and Sunshine does audition, amazing the club with "Listen". Though she is immediately accepted into the club, Sue Sylvester contacts Dustin Goolsby, the new director of rival glee club Vocal Adrenaline, who secures permanent U.S. residency and a condominium unit for Sunshine and her mother provided she join his club. Sunshine confesses that she would have loved to be in New Directions, but she felt that Rachel would have made her stay a "living hell". In "A Night of Neglect", Sunshine appears as a member of Carmel High's academic decathlon team that loses in the semi-finals to the McKinley High team. In that episode, Sunshine hears of New Direction's fundraising benefit for the McKinley team's finals expenses and volunteers to perform, promising to ask her 600 Twitter followers to attend. They accept her offer after she sings "All By Myself", but Dustin Goolsby pulls her out of the fundraiser and her fans do not come. Sunshine reappears in the season two finale "New York" for the National show choir competition. Sunshine tells Rachel that she has come to hate being in Vocal Adrenaline, and desperately wants to leave on the day of competition. Rachel encourages her to perform and apologizes for what she did to her at the beginning of the year. Sunshine sings the original song "As Long As You're There", and her group finishes in second place, while New Directions places twelfth.

==== Dustin Goolsby ====
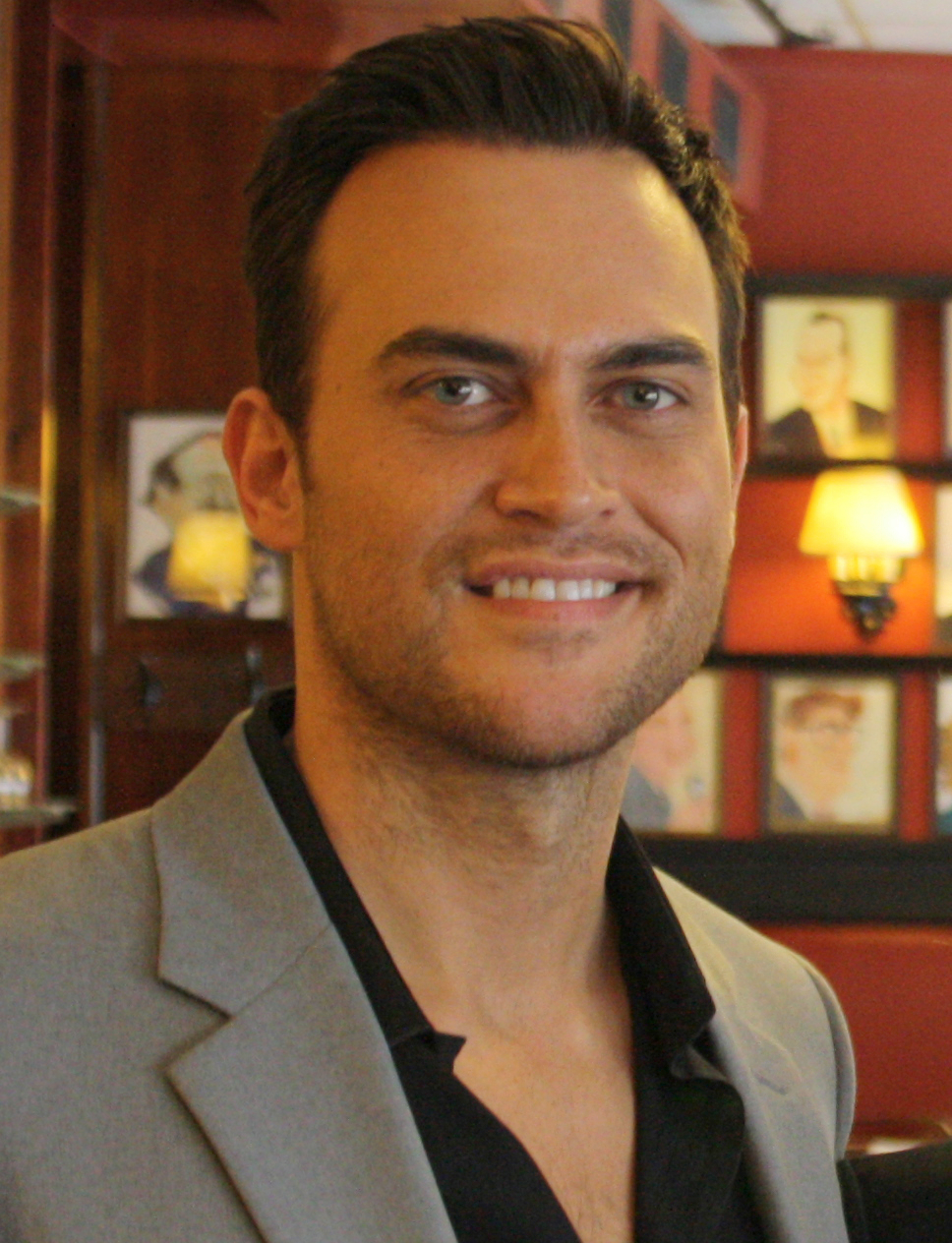
Cheyenne Jackson portrays Dustin Goolsby.

Dustin Goolsby (Cheyenne Jackson) is the director of rival glee club Vocal Adrenaline who replaces Shelby Corcoran (Idina Menzel) when she leaves the post after leading the team to four national championships in a row. Murphy described Dustin as "a complete villain", stating that he will "become very intertwined in Will's life". He is first introduced in the episode "Audition", escorting his new recruit Sunshine Corazón out of William McKinley High School and taking her away from its glee club, having been tipped off about her by Sue Sylvester, and employed the underhanded tactics of offering to sponsor Sunshine's visa and arranging an apartment for her and her family as payment for her joining Vocal Adrenaline despite her being enrolled at McKinley High. He returns in "A Night of Neglect", joining Sue's "League of Doom" to help her sabotage the McKinley glee club, and returns again at the National show choir competition in the season two finale, "New York", where Vocal Adrenaline comes in second—as is subsequently revealed in the third-season episode "I Am Unicorn"—and Goolsby is fired as director for failing to win a fifth national crown.

Jackson was originally considered for the role of Will, and in 2009 was initially cast in the Glee episode "Acafellas" as Vocal Adrenaline choreographer Dakota Stanley, but he was unable to perform due to illness.

==== Harmony ====
Harmony (Lindsay Pearce) is introduced in "The Purple Piano Project" at an Ohio mixer for future applicants to the New York Academy of Dramatic Arts (NYADA), and is one of a group of aspiring students to have been attending monthly since they were freshmen. She has been working in show business since before birth—an ultrasound of her was featured in an episode of Murder, She Wrote, and she later appeared in commercials for Gerber baby food. When Rachel and Kurt come to their first NYADA mixer, Harmony sings lead on an extensively choreographed mashup of "Anything Goes" and "Anything You Can Do" from the musicals Anything Goes and Annie Get Your Gun, which intimidates the two new arrivals. She returned in "Hold On to Sixteen", leading her glee club, the Unitards, to a third-place finish at Sectionals, after which she tells Kurt that she's a sophomore. Harmony is portrayed by The Glee Project runner-up Pearce, and her debut was met with critical acclaim. Emily St. James of The A.V. Club wrote that hers might be "the best new character ever", and TVLine's Michael Slezak felt that Harmony was "brilliantly bought to life" by Pearce. Kevin Fallon of The Atlantic said that her introduction bodes well for future Glee Project contestants and that "she brought, which the best new characters do, fresh and exciting aspects in the show's established leads". Lisa Respers France of CNN named Pearce's performance the best moment of the episode, and found that the character positively reminded her of "Glee of old". However, AfterEllen.com's Christie Keith was critical of her appearance, and wrote, "Since Lindsay is one of the reasons I couldn't stand to watch The Glee Project, and no, she can't sing remotely as well as Lea Michele, and none of the boys there was close to being as darling as Kurt, I was forced to suspend disbelief when the whole experience devastated Kurt and Rachel."

==== Grace Hitchens ====
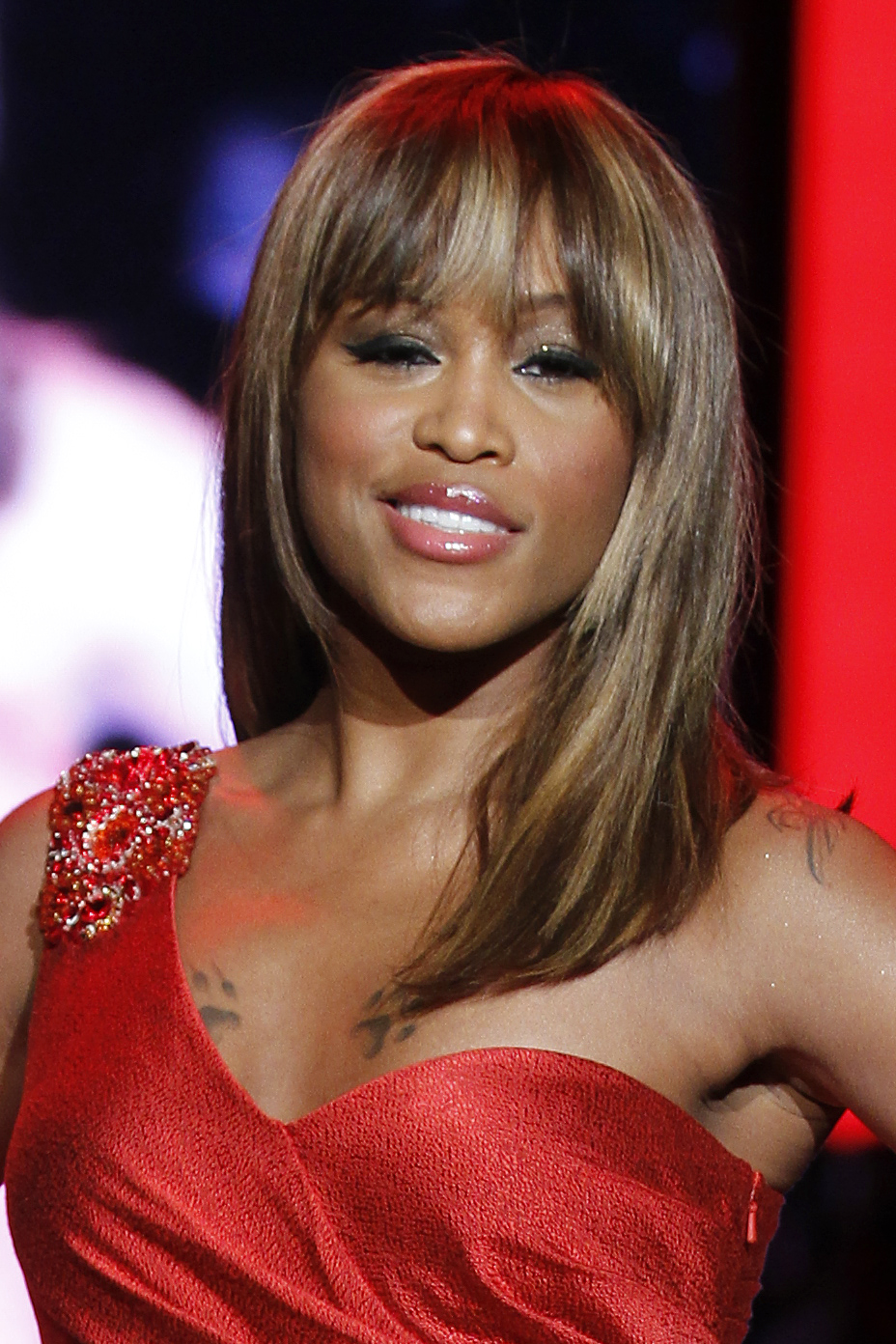
Eve portrays rival glee club director Grace Hitchens.

Grace Hitchens (Eve) is the show choir director of the Jane Addams Academy for troubled female youth. She is persuaded by Sue to use songs from New Directions' set list at Sectionals to give her group an edge in the competition. Though she feels guilty after the fact and attempts to inform the judges of her cheating, they have already unanimously chosen New Directions as the winning club. She and rival glee club director Dalton Rumba give Principal Figgins proof that Sue helped them cheat, leading to Sue's suspension. When comparing her character to McKinley High's glee club director, Will Schuester, Eve explained: "I come from a harder place. I'm the teacher of a reform school. I'm used to being very strict." Whitney Houston had been contacted to appear, but declined, so Eve took her place. Discussing her casting, Eve stated: "I got asked and I'd heard the buzz about the show. When the first pilot episode came out, I figured it was something different and something we haven't seen on TV before. I didn't want to turn it down!" Gerrick D. Kennedy for the Los Angeles Times was impressed by Eve's acting and "on-screen charm", and felt that she worked nicely in the "Hairography" episode. In contrast, Bobby Hankinson for the Houston Chronicle was disappointed Houston had not taken the role, and criticized Eve for her lack of personality.

==== Sebastian Smythe ====
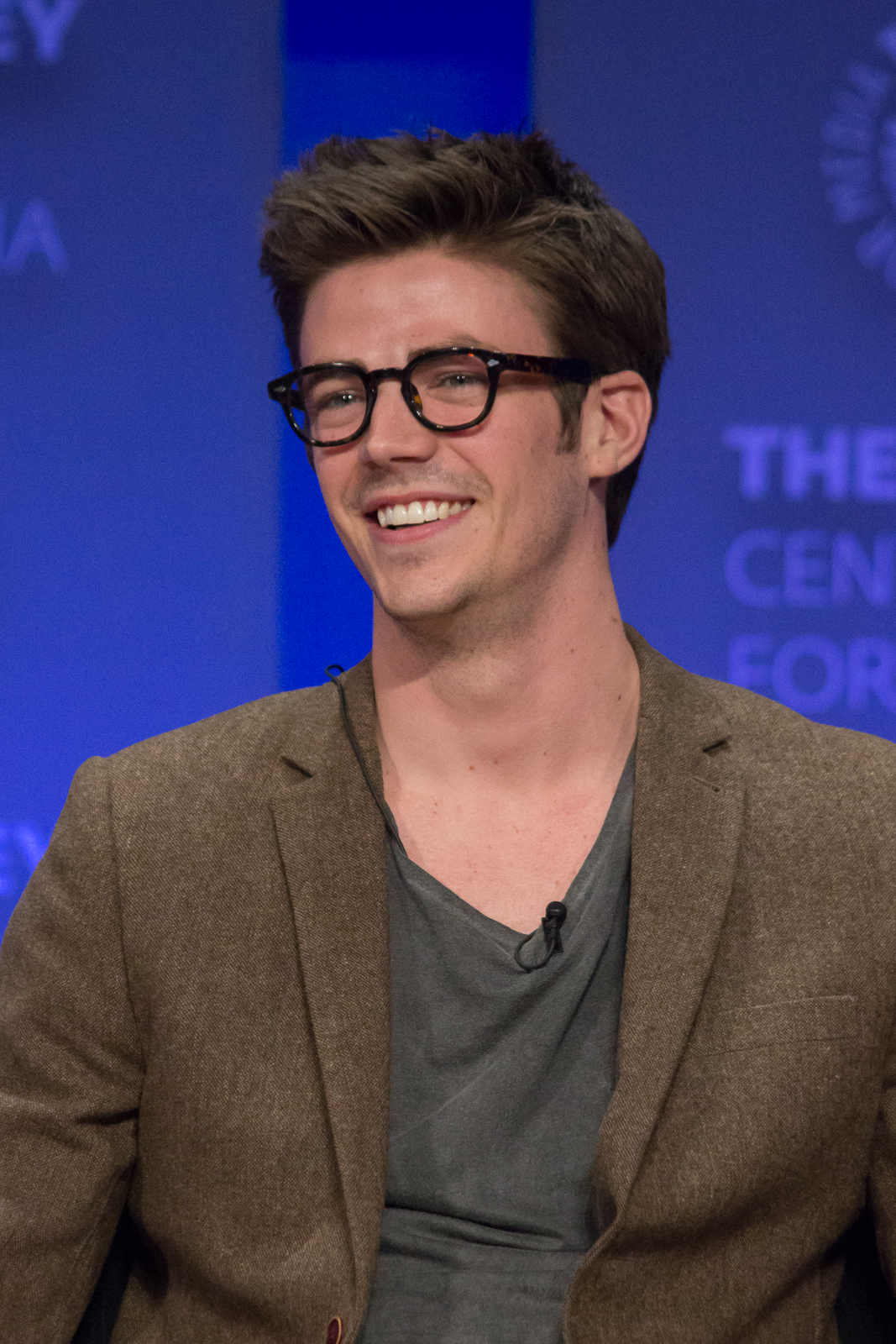
Grant Gustin portrays Dalton Academy student Sebastian Smythe.

Sebastian Smythe (Grant Gustin) is a student at Dalton Academy who transfers into the school in the show's third season. He is introduced as a new Dalton Academy Warbler in the fifth episode, "The First Time". When Blaine Anderson comes to Dalton to invite his Warbler friends to see a musical he's starring in at McKinley, Sebastian is attracted to him and propositions him. However, Blaine is happy with his current boyfriend, Kurt Hummel, and turns him down. Sebastian suggests that he and Kurt join him at a local gay bar, though his further efforts to come between Blaine and Kurt are unsuccessful and Kurt later warns Sebastian away. Sebastian becomes captain of the Warblers, and in "Michael", he spikes the New Directions plan to do Michael Jackson songs at Regionals by adding Jackson's music to the Warblers setlist. When the McKinley glee club challenges the Warblers for the right to use Jackson, Sebastian throws a slushie spiked with rock salt intended for Kurt that injures Blaine – damaging his cornea and requiring surgery to repair. Santana gets him to privately admit his perfidy, but unknown to Sebastian his admission was taped and the other Warblers are made aware of his actions. Undeterred, Sebastian tries to blackmail Rachel into not competing at Regionals by threatening to post faked nude pictures of Finn on the internet, but destroys the pictures after Dave Karofsky attempts suicide. Sebastian had cruelly rebuffed Karofsky at a gay bar and blames himself. The Warblers lose to New Directions at Regionals. Sebastian returns in the fourth season although he loses the position of Warbler captain to Hunter Clarington. He is a part of the effort to persuade Blaine to rejoin the Warblers. His last appearance on the series was in the fifth-season premiere "Love, Love, Love", when Blaine asks the Warblers to help him propose to Kurt. It seems that he is the Warblers' captain again when he is the one to announce that they agree to do so.

When Gustin made his first appearance, it was reported he was playing a new "major" recurring character, a "gay Dalton Academy Warbler who sets his sights on Blaine". Gustin won the role after "an exhaustive, weeks-long casting search", and the character is referred to as "promiscuous" and "scheming". Gustin's first day on the Glee set was September 26, 2011. He had been playing the role of Baby John in the touring company of Broadway revival of West Side Story since it opened on September 30, 2010, and left the show after performing on September 23, 2011, to return for his first day with Glee.

==== Jesse St. James ====
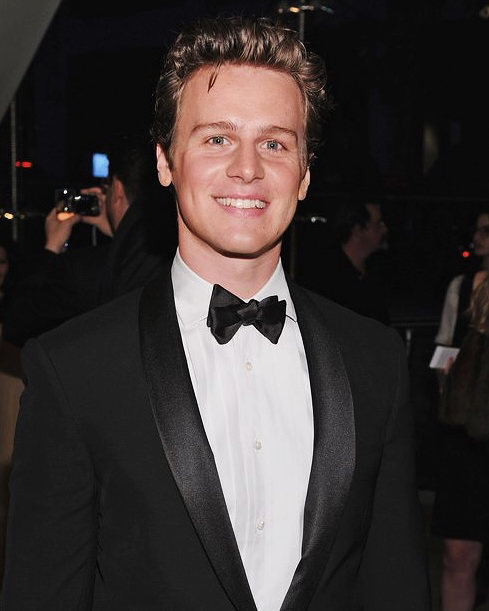
Jonathan Groff portrays Jesse St. James.

Jesse St. James (Jonathan Groff) is the male lead of Vocal Adrenaline and one of the main antagonists of the first season, becoming a supporting character in the later seasons. Introduced in the episode "Hell-O", he is directed to befriend Rachel by Vocal Adrenaline coach Shelby Corcoran (Idina Menzel), who is secretly her biological mother. Jesse and Rachel begin dating, and he briefly transfers to McKinley High, joining New Directions. Once the truth about Shelby is revealed, however, Jesse transfers back. He admits to Shelby that he agreed to "seduce" Rachel because he thought it would be a good acting exercise, but he started to develop real feelings for her. However, he ends his relationship with Rachel by egging her in the McKinley High parking lot along with his fellow members of Vocal Adrenaline, humiliating her. In "Journey to Regionals", Jesse and the rest of Vocal Adrenaline beat the New Directions at regionals with a standout performance of "Bohemian Rhapsody". They go on to win his fourth consecutive national show choir championship, which occurs offscreen. In the season 2 episode "Prom Queen", he returns to Ohio after having flunked out of UCLA, in an attempt to befriend Rachel again, claiming that his biggest regret was choosing Vocal Adrenaline over love. He joins Rachel, Sam and Mercedes, who have teamed up to go do "prom on a budget", at the McKinley junior prom; however, after getting into a fight with a jealous Finn, he's kicked out of prom. He sets up a consulting business to help show choirs with their performances and offers to consult the New Directions as his first client. His resumed relationship with Rachel ultimately fails when Finn suddenly kisses her in the middle of a Nationals performance and Rachel chooses to get back together with him. Jesse returns in the latter part of the third season as the new coach of Vocal Adrenaline, replacing the fired Dustin Goolsby. In "Nationals", he and Rachel have a friendly moment when he confides in her how nervous and pressured he is to win after Vocal Adrenaline lost for the first time in years the year before. She encourages him on his first Nationals as a coach and jibes that the New Directions are going to beat him, to which he tells her he likes her cocky side. He also congratulates Finn on being engaged to Rachel. Later, after sadly watching Rachel perform at Nationals (and implying he still has feelings for her), Jesse talks to Carmen Tibideaux (Whoopi Goldberg) and tells her Rachel's the most talented person he knows and that she will make an excellent contribution to NYADA. He had auditioned for NYADA a few years prior but was rejected; Carmen tells him at Nationals that despite the rejection, he has remarkable vocal range and passion. New Directions goes on to win Nationals, and it is unknown what happens to Jesse afterwards. He returns in the season 6 episode “We Built This Glee Club”, where he tries to convince Rachel to join him in a new Broadway show she had auditioned for, a role she was offered after some encouragement to the producers from Jesse. However, she chooses to re-enroll in NYADA instead of accepting the part, a decision he accepts and the two share a kiss. In the series finale, titled “Dreams Come True”, Jesse and Rachel attend a fictionalized 2020 Tony Awards ceremony. It is revealed that Jesse is now a Tony winner and the director of Rachel's Broadway show, and the two are now happily married. Jesse joins the rest of the New Directions in the auditorium during the group performance "I Lived".

In a controversial essay for Newsweek, critic Ramin Setoodeh wrote that Groff, who is openly gay, was unconvincing as the straight Jesse ("he seems more like your average theatre queen; a better romantic match for Kurt than Rachel"). Groff's performance was defended by Murphy and guest star Kristin Chenoweth, both of whom described Setoodeh's essay as homophobic; it was also condemned by GLAAD president Jarrett Barrios.

==== Other rival choir personnel ====
Whit Hertford appears as Dakota Stanley, a glee club choreographer who worked for Vocal Adrenaline early in season one, and was briefly hired by New Directions. Michael Hitchcock appears as Dalton Rumba, the coach of the Haverbrook Deaf Choir. Senior Dalton Academy Warblers from the second season include Wes (Telly Leung), David (Titus Makin Jr.), and Thad (Eddy Martin), who run the group's meetings. Another Warbler is Nick (Curt Mega), who sings lead for the Warblers in the third season. Jeff (Riker Lynch) and Trent (Dominic Barnes) are also fellow Warblers. Hunter Clarington (Nolan Gerard Funk) is introduced in the fourth season's seventh episode as the new captain of the Warblers. Hunter is a new Dalton transfer student, recruited from a Regionals-winning military academy. American Idol Season 11 runner-up Jessica Sanchez appeared in two episodes of the fourth season, including the season finale, as a "legendary diva powerhouse singer" named Frida Romero from a school that goes up against McKinley at Regionals.

=== Family of McKinley students and faculty ===
==== Kendra Giardi ====
Kendra Giardi (née Del Monico; Jennifer Aspen) is Terri Schuester's sister. She and her husband Phil (Michael Loeffelholz) have triplet sons (played by Ethan, Aidan, and Ben Freedman). She influences many of Terri's decisions during her hysterical-turned-fake pregnancy by assisting Terri in her schemes, and predicting disaster whenever Terri contemplates confessing the truth to Will. In the episode "Throwdown", Kendra and Terri bully their obstetrician, Dr. Wu (Kenneth Choi), into faking an ultrasound to convince Will the baby is real. Entertainment Weekly's Wendy Mitchell deemed Kendra "hilarious" and wished to see more of her, while her colleague at the magazine, Ken Tucker, described Kendra as "a garish cartoon who exists only to further the pregnancy plotting".

==== Carl Howell ====
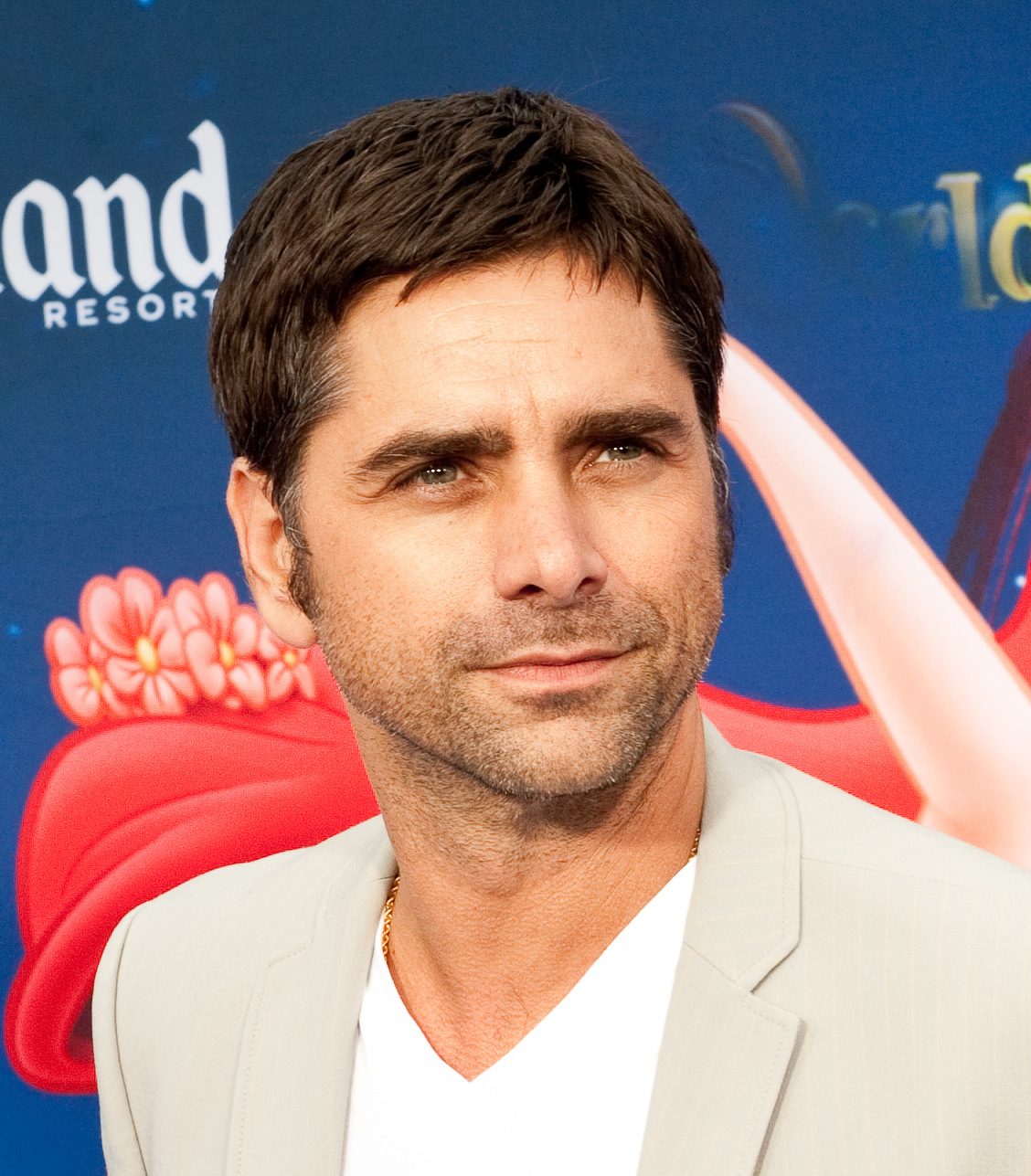
John Stamos portrays Carl Howell.

Carl Howell (John Stamos) is a dentist, introduced in "Britney/Brittany" as Emma's boyfriend. As a fan of The Rocky Horror Picture Show, Carl volunteers to play Eddie in McKinley High's school production of the musical. He dislikes Emma and Will spending time alone together, aware that Will has feelings for her. In the episode "Special Education", Carl and Emma marry in Las Vegas. However, after Emma naively advocates abstinence to the glee club with a performance of "Afternoon Delight", a song actually about the joys of sex, Carl requests a private couples counseling session with Holly Holliday, the acting sexual education teacher, as his and Emma's marriage hadn't been consummated after four months. Holly forces Emma to admit she is still attracted to Will, leading to Carl walking out and filing for annulment.

==== Carole Hummel ====
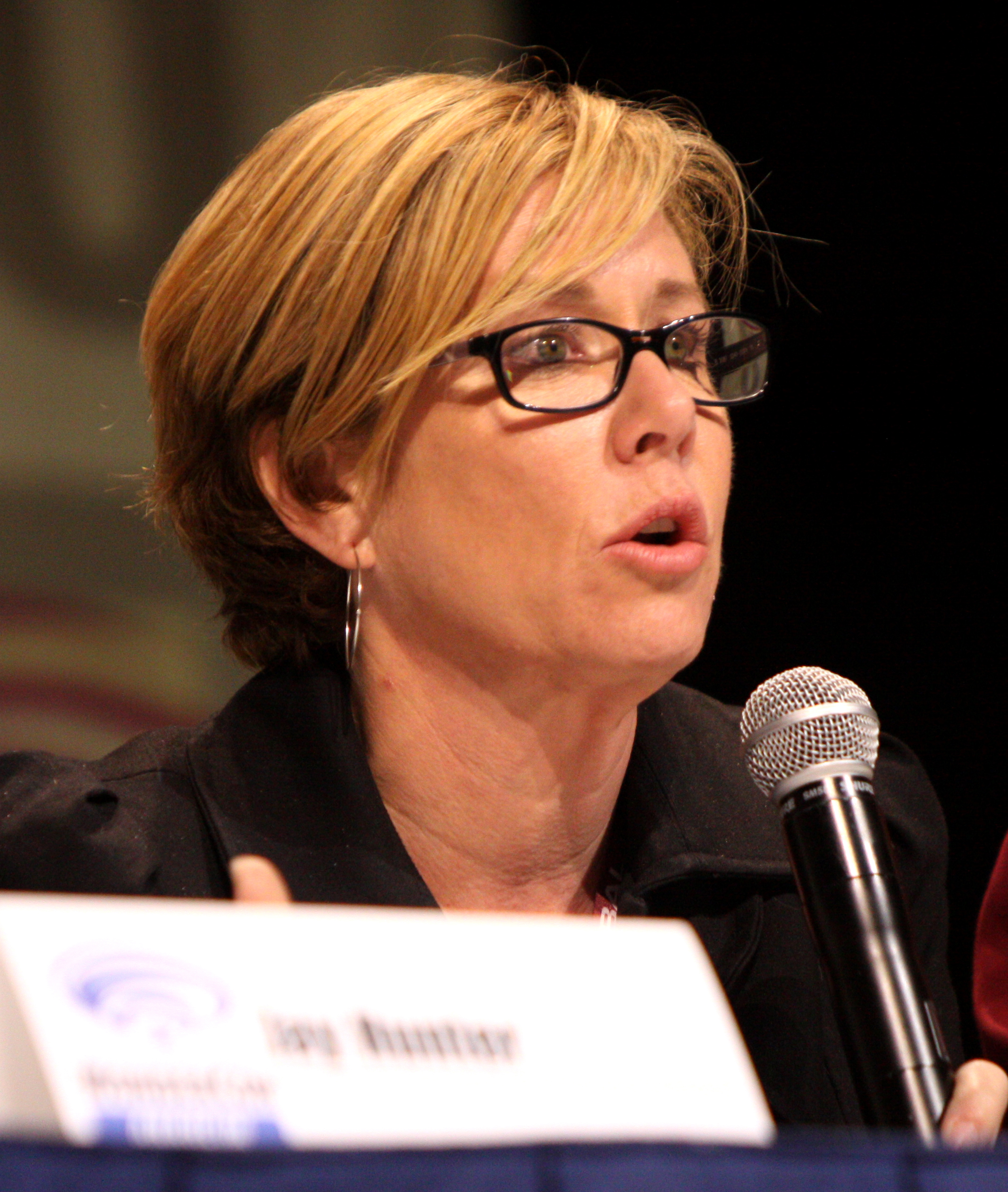
Romy Rosemont portrays Finn's widowed mother, Carole.

Carole Hummel (previously Hudson) (Romy Rosemont) is Finn's widowed mother and Kurt's stepmother, and wife to Kurt's dad Burt. When Finn was young, she had a relationship with a lawn-care worker who left her for a younger woman. Upon discovering that Quinn is pregnant, she allows her to move in with them when Quinn's father kicks her out. Kurt sets Carole up with his father Burt in an attempt to get closer to Finn. They decide to move in together, until Finn uses a homophobic slur against Kurt and Burt refuses to allow him to stay in his home. Their relationship continues, however, and Carole visits Burt's bedside when he suffers a heart attack early in the second season. She marries him later that fall. James Poniewozik of Time felt that Carole's reaction to the news of Quinn's pregnancy demonstrated how far Glee had evolved from the "broadly caricatured show" it was in its early episodes. He commented that in the pilot episode, Carole was "just the slightly pathetic figure we saw pining after the lawn-care guy", however her reaction to Quinn's pregnancy was "a brilliant bit of characterization through small moments", an example of how Glee was "becoming very good at showing how life happens in small exchanges in people's laundry rooms and finished basements".

==== Millie Rose ====
Millie Rose (Trisha Rae Stahl) is introduced in "The New Rachel" as the lunch lady and Marley Rose's mother. She is made fun of by students and the glee club members initially for her weight, but when they discover she is Marley's mom they stand up for her. She makes all of Marley's clothes and is particularly fond of Marley's boyfriend Jake Puckerman and the rest of New Directions. In the episode "Glee, Actually" Sue breaks into her house and stocks it with presents and money. Millie tries to give it back, but Sue refuses to take it, so she brings Sue to the auditorium where the New Directions perform "Have Yourself a Merry Little Christmas" for her.

==== Jean Sylvester ====
Jean Sylvester (Robin Trocki) is Sue Sylvester's older sister. Jean, who has Down syndrome, lives in an assisted living facility, and is the only character Sue consistently treats with care and compassion. She is a factor in Sue's decision to admit Becky Jackson—who also has Down syndrome—to the Cheerios. Sue reveals that, as a child, people laughed at and were mean to Jean, and Sue prayed for it to stop, but it didn't; this is why Sue believes there is no God.

Jean dies near the end of the second season, in the episode "Funeral".

==== Other family of McKinley students and faculty ====
First season guest stars include Victor Garber and Debra Monk as Will's parents, and Gina Hecht plays Puck's mother in the eighth episode, and is seen again in the third-season finale and the fourth season's holiday episode. Gregg Henry and Charlotte Ross play Quinn's parents Russell and Judy Fabray in the tenth episode; Ross makes additional appearances in each of the first three seasons. In the second season, Carol Burnett appears as Sue's "famous Nazi hunter" mother, Kari Coleman appears as Donna Jackson, Becky Jackson's mother, and Daniel Roebuck appears twice as Paul Karofsky, McKinley High student Dave Karofsky's dad, a role he reprises in the third season. Also in the third season, Mike Chang's parents Julia Chang (Tamlyn Tomita) and Mike Chang, Sr. (Keong Sim) appear as recurring characters starting in the season's third episode. Emma's parents—Rusty and Rose Pillsbury—are also seen in that third episode and appear again in "Yes/No" and a third time in season four's "Girls (and Boys) On Film"; they are played by Don Most and Valerie Mahaffey respectively. Ivonne Coll plays Santana's grandmother in "I Kissed a Girl"; Gloria Estefan appears as her mother, Maribel Lopez, in the graduation finale to the third season, "Goodbye". Both actresses return in the sixth season, Coll in the sixth episode, and both she and Estefan in the eighth episode, "A Wedding". The parents of Sam Evans appear in "Hold on to Sixteen": his father is played by John Schneider, and his mother by Tanya Clarke. Rachel's two fathers, Hiram and LeRoy Berry (Jeff Goldblum and Brian Stokes Mitchell), first appear in "Heart" in their two-episode recurring roles, with Stokes Mitchell returning in the season six premiere, "Loser Like Me". Blaine's brother Cooper Anderson, played by Matt Bomer, appears in "Big Brother". Puck's father, played by Thomas Calabro, appears in the eighteenth episode, "Choke". In the fourth season, Rob and Betty Adams, the parents of Wade "Unique" Adams, appear in the sixth episode, "Glease", and are played by Mark Christopher Lawrence and Davenia McFadden; Jake Puckerman's mother is played by Aisha Tyler, and appears in "Glee, Actually"; and Katey Sagal plays the mother of Artie Abrams, and appeared in the penultimate episode, "Wonder-ful". In the sixth season, Brittany Pierce's mother and father Whitney and Pierce Pierce appear twice, portrayed by Jennifer Coolidge and Ken Jeong, and Blaine Anderson's mother Pam (Gina Gershon) appears in the second of these, "A Wedding".

=== Acquaintances of McKinley students and faculty ===
==== Rod Remington ====
Rod Remington (Bill A. Jones) is a television news anchor on the newscast where Sue Sylvester has an opinion segment ("Sue's Corner"). Rod and Sue had a brief relationship shortly after his wife drowned that began and ended in the episode "Mash-up"; she caught him making out with his co-anchor, Andrea Carmichael (Earlene Davis). Rod and Andrea later marry and announce it during a newscast in the episode "Furt", humiliating Sue. As a local celebrity, Rod has been tapped to judge show choir competitions—he has appeared as a judge for four of those that New Directions has competed in: the first and sixth season's Sectionals competitions, and the Regionals competitions for the first two seasons.

==== April Rhodes ====
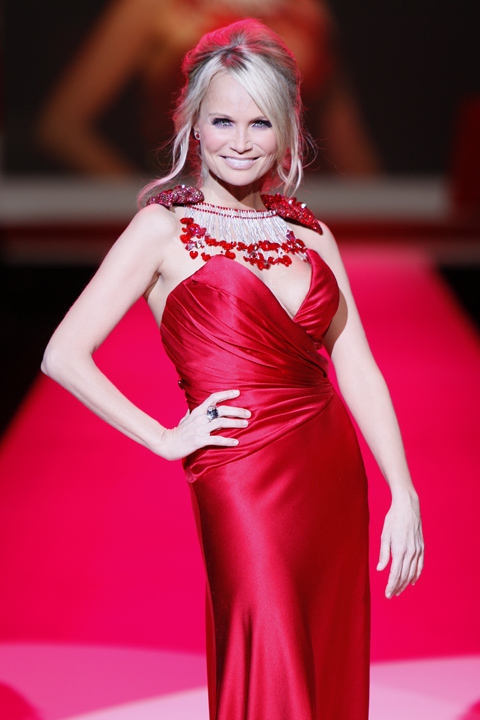
Kristin Chenoweth portrays former glee club star April Rhodes.

April Rhodes (Kristin Chenoweth) is a former member of the glee club who never finished high school and ended up hitting rock bottom, as well as Will's high school crush, who never acknowledged his existence. She briefly rejoins the glee club as an adult, during a period in which Rachel had left the club and it was in need of a female lead. During her revisit to the school, she gives muscle magazines and alcohol to Kurt, she teaches Mercedes and Tina how to shoplift, and has a brief romance with Puck. April appears once again, at which point she has become the mistress to an elderly tycoon and is the owner/operator of a "cabaret roller rink". Suddenly her boyfriend dies and she is paid $2 million in hush money by the widow not to go to the newspapers. April then decides to buy the glee club their auditorium back, now called The April Rhodes Civic Pavilion, and return to Broadway to back an all-white version of The Wiz. The show flops, and she returns in the season 2 episode "Rumours" to get Will's help with her new one-woman show, CrossRhodes. Robert Bianco for USA Today wrote of Chenoweth's guest appearance in "The Rhodes Not Taken": "Her presence may not make much sense, but that's probably all right. If it means hearing Chenoweth sing, we can put up with any explanation the show cares to offer." Raymund Flandez for The Wall Street Journal was equally positive regarding Chenoweth's role, praising her "powerful voice", "kittenish mien" and "commanding presence". Eric Goldman for IGN stated that Chenoweth was "terrific" as April, and that the character was a "hysterical creation". The Los Angeles Times Denise Martin praised Chenoweth's versatility as April, opining that her performance was worthy of a second Emmy win.

==== Bryan Ryan ====
Bryan Ryan (Neil Patrick Harris) is Will's high school nemesis. Bryan appears in "Dream On" as a school board member, out to cut district arts programs and the McKinley High glee club in particular as revenge for the latter giving him false hope back when he was its lead singer. Harris won the 2010 Primetime Emmy Award for "Outstanding Guest Actor in a Comedy Series" for his appearance.

==== Other acquaintances of McKinley students and faculty ====
Guest stars have included Josh Groban and Olivia Newton-John, who appeared as themselves both separately and acting as judges at the first-season show choir regionals competition. The second season's regionals judges are played by Kathy Griffin and Loretta Devine as Tammy Jean Albertson and Sister Mary Constance, respectively. In the third season, the judges for the nationals competition are Lindsay Lohan and Perez Hilton appearing as themselves, and Rex Lee as Chicago Alderman Martin Fong. Kent Avenido appears in the first two seasons as Howard Bamboo, Terri's dyslexic coworker who joins the Acafellas and later Sue's "League of Doom", and Kenneth Choi plays Dr. Wu, Terri's obstetrician. Earlene Davis plays Andrea Carmichael, Rod Remington's TV news co-anchor who later marries him. She quits as co-anchor midway through the fourth season, but is seen again as a co-anchor in the following season. Kathleen Quinlan appears in "Born This Way" as Dr. Shane, a psychiatrist treating Emma Pillsbury. Cooter Menkins, a football recruiter played by Eric Bruskotter, came to McKinley in "The First Time" to scout football players for Ohio State, and is attracted to Coach Beiste, whom he later marries; after Cooter abuses Beiste later in the third season, he leaves Cooter. In the sixth season, Geraldo Rivera appears as himself, doing an interview with Sue after she has been fired as McKinley High's Principal; a segment of the interview includes an appearance by Michael Bolton, who denies knowing Sue or having been the parent of Sue's daughter Robin.

=== NYADA and New York City ===
From NYADA, Whoopi Goldberg first appears in the third season as Carmen Tibideaux, a dean from NYADA who comes to Ohio to preside over Rachel's and Kurt's auditions to the school, in the episode "Choke". She appeared again, including at the Nationals competition in Chicago, and returns in the fourth and fifth seasons for scenes set at NYADA.

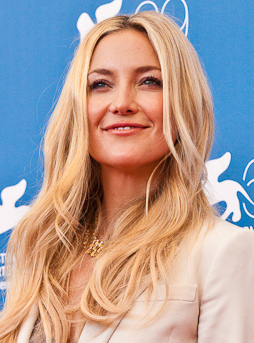
Kate Hudson played as Cassandra July, dance instructor at NYADA.

Kate Hudson appears as Cassandra July, Rachel's dance instructor at NYADA who, according to Falchuk, teaches "based on negative reinforcement". She was introduced in the fourth-season premiere for a six-episode arc, however, Cassandra only appears in five episodes: four in 2012 and one in 2013.

Dean Geyer performs the role of Brody Weston, a handsome NYADA junior who shows an interest in Rachel, during the fourth season. Their relationship gets to the point that the two live together for a while, but they break up after Santana discovers that Brody is a gigolo.

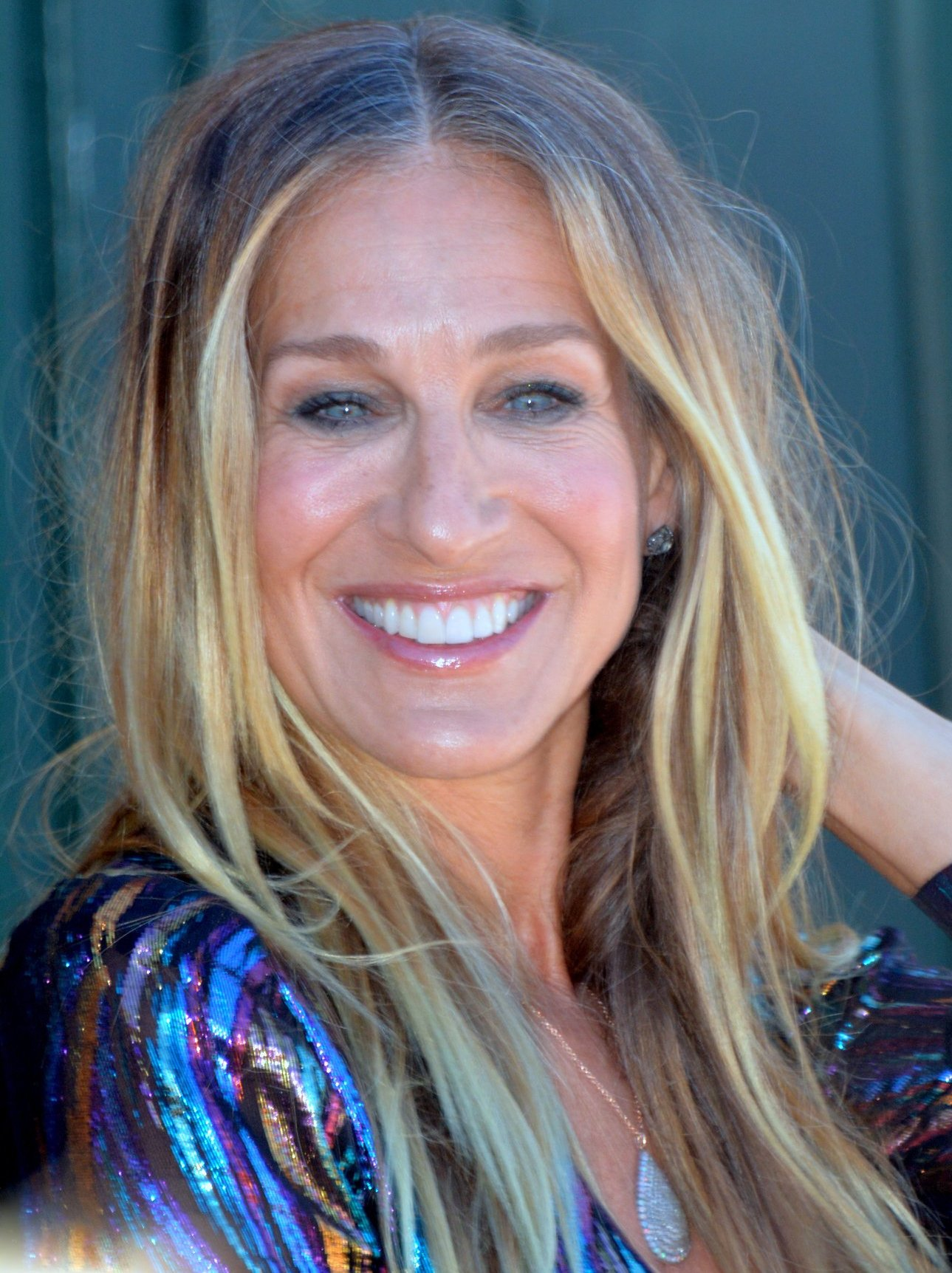
Sarah Jessica Parker played Vogue.com director Isabelle Wright.

Sarah Jessica Parker is introduced in the third episode of the fourth season, "Makeover" as Isabelle Wright, who is Kurt's mentor at Vogue.com after having signed him on as an intern. She appears in several episodes during the season.

British actor Oliver Kieran Jones first appears in the fourth-season episode "Sadie Hawkins" in a recurring role as Adam Crawford, a NYADA senior and the leader of the school's glee club: Adam's Apples, which Kurt looks into joining when he starts classes at the school for the spring semester. Kurt and Adam subsequently begin seeing each other, though the relationship doesn't become serious. Oliver Kieran Jones graduated from LAMDA, a real London school similar to Glee's fictional NYADA.

Amy Aquino and Michael Lerner appear in the fourth season as producers of a Broadway production of Funny Girl that Rachel auditions for; Lerner's character was named Sidney Greene. Lerner appears again in the fifth season, and in that season's premiere, two more Funny Girl–related roles were introduced: Peter Facinelli plays Rupert Campion, the musical's director, and Ioan Gruffudd appears as Paolo San Pablo, the show's lead male actor.

Santana, then Rachel, and finally Kurt go to work at the Spotlight Diner, run by Gunther (Christopher Curry). Another employee is Dani, played by Demi Lovato, a "struggling artist" who becomes Santana's romantic interest, and who debuted in the season's second episode, "Tina in the Sky with Diamonds".

Adam Lambert debuted in the fourth episode of the fifth season, "A Katy or a Gaga", as Elliot "Starchild" Gilbert, a student at NYU. Starchild auditions for a band that Kurt is starting, and after initially being refused as too flamboyant, is ultimately asked to join the band—along with Dani, Santana, and Rachel—because he is extremely talented. Starchild was something of a "nemesis" to Kurt, who saw him as a rival, though ultimately they became friends, and Rachel was Elliott's roommate when she temporarily moved out of the loft she shared with Kurt.
