= List of songs in Glee season 4 =

Glee is an American musical comedy-drama television series produced by Fox. It focuses on the glee club New Directions, at the fictional William McKinley High School in Lima, Ohio. The show was created by Ryan Murphy, Brad Falchuk and Ian Brennan, and features many cover versions of songs sung on-screen by the characters. Murphy is responsible for selecting all of the songs used, and strives to maintain a balance between show tunes and chart hits, as he wants there to be "something for everybody in every episode." Once Murphy selects a song, rights are cleared with its publishers by music supervisor P.J. Bloom, and music producer Adam Anders rearranges it for the Glee cast. Numbers are pre-recorded by the cast, while choreographer Zach Woodlee constructs the accompanying dance moves, which are then taught to the cast and filmed. Studio recordings of tracks are then made. The process begins six to eight weeks before each episode is filmed, and can end as late as the day before filming begins. The list below contains all 136 musical performances of the fourth season, with each performance delivering an individual song or a mashup of two or more songs in a single performance.

== Songs ==
List of songs in Glee season four
Title	Version covered	Performed by	Episode	Single	Album	Ref.
"Sister Christian"	Night Ranger	Brody Weston	1. "The New Rachel"	No	No	
"Call Me Maybe"	Carly Rae Jepsen	Unique Adams, Blaine Anderson, Tina Cohen-Chang and Brittany Pierce	1. "The New Rachel"	Yes	The Complete Season Four	
"Americano" / "Dance Again" (Note: Glee: The Music, Season 4, Volume 1 bonus tracks.)	Lady Gaga / Jennifer Lopez feat. Pitbull	Cassandra July with NYADA students	1. "The New Rachel"	Yes	Season 4, Volume 1	
"Busters Get Popped"	Original composition	Stoner Brett Bukowski	1. "The New Rachel"	No	No	
"Never Say Never"	The Fray	Jake Puckerman	1. "The New Rachel"	Yes	The Complete Season Four	
"Ave Maria"	Franz Schubert	Beatrice McClaine	1. "The New Rachel"	No	No	
"New York State of Mind"	Billy Joel	Rachel Berry and Marley Rose	1. "The New Rachel"	Yes	Season 4, Volume 1	
"It's Time"	Imagine Dragons	Blaine Anderson	1. "The New Rachel"	Yes	Season 4, Volume 1	
"Chasing Pavements"	Adele	Marley Rose with New Directions	1. "The New Rachel"	Yes	The Complete Season Four	
"Hold It Against Me"	Britney Spears	Brittany Pierce and Kitty Wilde with the McKinley High Cheerios	2. "Britney 2.0"	Yes	Britney 2.0	
"Boys" / "Boyfriend"	Britney Spears feat. Pharrell Williams / Justin Bieber	Artie Abrams and Blaine Anderson	2. "Britney 2.0"	Yes	Britney 2.0	
"Womanizer"	Britney Spears	Unique Adams, Tina Cohen-Chang and Marley Rose with McKinley's female gym class	2. "Britney 2.0"	Yes	Britney 2.0	
"3"	Britney Spears	Tina Cohen-Chang, Joe Hart and Sam Evans	2. "Britney 2.0"	Yes	Britney 2.0	
"Crazy" / "(You Drive Me) Crazy"	Aerosmith / Britney Spears	Marley Rose and Jake Puckerman	2. "Britney 2.0"	Yes	Britney 2.0	
"Oops!... I Did It Again"	Britney Spears	Rachel Berry with Brody Weston and NYADA students	2. "Britney 2.0"	Yes	Britney 2.0	
"Gimme More"	Britney Spears	Brittany Pierce with New Directions	2. "Britney 2.0"	Yes	Britney 2.0	
"Everytime"	Britney Spears	Marley Rose	2. "Britney 2.0"	Yes	Britney 2.0	
"Everybody Wants to Rule the World"	Tears for Fears	Blaine Anderson	3. "Makeover"	Yes	The Complete Season Four	
"Celebrity Skin"	Hole	Brittany Pierce and Sam Evans	3. "Makeover"	Yes	The Complete Season Four	
"The Way You Look Tonight" / "You're Never Fully Dressed Without a Smile"	Fred Astaire / Annie	Isabelle Wright, Kurt Hummel and Rachel Berry	3. "Makeover"	Yes	The Complete Season Four	
"A Change Would Do You Good"	Sheryl Crow	Rachel Berry and Brody Weston	3. "Makeover"	Yes	The Complete Season Four	
"Barely Breathing"	Duncan Sheik	Blaine Anderson and Finn Hudson	4. "The Break Up"	Yes	The Complete Season Four	
"Give Your Heart a Break"	Demi Lovato	Rachel Berry and Brody Weston	4. "The Break Up"	Yes	Season 4, Volume 1	
"Teenage Dream" (Acoustic Version)	Katy Perry	Blaine Anderson	4. "The Break Up"	Yes	The Complete Season Four	
"Don't Speak"	No Doubt	Finn Hudson, Blaine Anderson, Rachel Berry and Kurt Hummel	4. "The Break Up"	Yes	The Complete Season Four	
"Mine"	Taylor Swift	Santana Lopez	4. "The Break Up"	Yes	Season 4, Volume 1	
"The Scientist"	Coldplay	Finn Hudson, Blaine Anderson, Santana Lopez, Kurt Hummel, Brittany Pierce, Will Schuester, Emma Pillsbury and Rachel Berry	4. "The Break Up"	Yes	Season 4, Volume 1	
"Hopelessly Devoted to You"	Grease	Blaine Anderson	5. "The Role You Were Born to Play"	Yes	Presents Glease	
"Blow Me (One Last Kiss)"	Pink	Unique Adams and Marley Rose	5. "The Role You Were Born to Play"	Yes	The Complete Season Four	
"Juke Box Hero"	Foreigner	Finn Hudson and Ryder Lynn	5. "The Role You Were Born to Play"	Yes	The Complete Season Four	
"Everybody Talks"	Neon Trees	Jake Puckerman and Kitty Wilde	5. "The Role You Were Born to Play"	Yes	Season 4, Volume 1	
"Born to Hand Jive"	Grease	Mercedes Jones, Marley Rose, Jake Puckerman and Ryder Lynn with Unique Adams, Mike Chang, Sam Evans, Joe Hart, Sugar Motta, Brittany Pierce and Kitty Wilde	5. "The Role You Were Born to Play"	Yes	Presents Glease	
"Greased Lightnin'"	Grease	Ryder Lynn and Sam Evans with Artie Abrams, Mike Chang, Joe Hart, Finn Hudson and Jake Puckerman	6. "Glease"	Yes	Presents Glease	
"Look at Me, I'm Sandra Dee"	Grease	Kitty Wilde with Unique Adams, Tina Cohen-Chang, Sugar Motta and Brittany Pierce	6. "Glease"	Yes	Presents Glease	
"Beauty School Dropout"	Grease	Blaine Anderson with Tina Cohen-Chang, Santana Lopez, Sugar Motta, Brittany Pierce and Kitty Wilde	6. "Glease"	Yes	Presents Glease	
"Look at Me, I'm Sandra Dee (Reprise)"	Grease	Marley Rose	6. "Glease"	Yes	Presents Glease	
"There Are Worse Things I Could Do"	Grease	Santana Lopez, Cassandra July and Unique Adams	6. "Glease"	Yes	Presents Glease	
"You're the One That I Want"	Grease	Ryder Lynn, Marley Rose, Finn Hudson, Rachel Berry, Santana Lopez, Blaine Anderson, Kurt Hummel and Brittany Pierce	6. "Glease"	Yes	Presents Glease	
"Dark Side"	Kelly Clarkson	Blaine Anderson with Dalton Academy Warblers	7. "Dynamic Duets"	Yes	Season 4, Volume 1	
"Superman"	R.E.M.	Jake Puckerman and Ryder Lynn	7. "Dynamic Duets"	Yes	The Complete Season Four	
"Holding Out for a Hero"	Bonnie Tyler	Kitty Wilde and Marley Rose with New Directions	7. "Dynamic Duets"	Yes	Season 4, Volume 1	
"Heroes"	David Bowie	Sam Evans and Blaine Anderson	7. "Dynamic Duets"	Yes	Season 4, Volume 1	
"Some Nights"	fun.	New Directions	7. "Dynamic Duets"	Yes	Season 4, Volume 1	
"Homeward Bound" / "Home"	Simon & Garfunkel / Phillip Phillips	Quinn Fabray, Noah Puckerman, Mike Chang, Santana Lopez, Mercedes Jones and Finn Hudson	8. "Thanksgiving"	Yes	Season 4, Volume 1	
"Come See About Me"	The Supremes	Quinn Fabray, Santana Lopez and Brittany Pierce	8. "Thanksgiving"	Yes	The Complete Season Four	
"Whistle"	Flo Rida	Hunter Clarington with Dalton Academy Warblers	8. "Thanksgiving"	Yes	The Complete Season Four	
"Live While We're Young"	One Direction	Sebastian Smythe with Dalton Academy Warblers	8. "Thanksgiving"	Yes	Season 4, Volume 1	
"Let's Have a Kiki" / "Turkey Lurkey Time" (Note: Version on album does not include "Turkey Lurkey Time.")	Scissor Sisters / Promises, Promises	Isabelle Wright, Kurt Hummel and Rachel Berry with Isabelle's party guests and Brody Weston	8. "Thanksgiving"	Yes	Season 4, Volume 1	
"Over the River and Through the Wood" / "She'll Be Coming 'Round the Mountain"	Lydia Maria Child / Traditional	The Rosedale Mennonites	8. "Thanksgiving"	No	No	
"Gangnam Style"	PSY	Tina Cohen-Chang with New Directions	8. "Thanksgiving"	Yes	Season 4, Volume 1	
"Somethin' Stupid"	Frank Sinatra and Nancy Sinatra	Sam Evans and Brittany Pierce	9. "Swan Song"	Yes	Season 4, Volume 1	
"All That Jazz"	Chicago	Cassandra July and Rachel Berry with NYADA students	9. "Swan Song"	Yes	The Complete Season Four	
"Being Good Isn't Good Enough"	Barbra Streisand	Rachel Berry	9. "Swan Song"	Yes	The Complete Season Four	
"O Holy Night"	Traditional	Rachel Berry	9. "Swan Song"	Yes	The Christmas Album	
"Being Alive"	Company	Kurt Hummel	9. "Swan Song"	Yes	The Complete Season Four	
"Don't Dream It's Over"	Crowded House	Finn Hudson, Marley Rose, Tina Cohen-Chang, Blaine Anderson, Sam Evans and Brittany Pierce with New Directions	9. "Swan Song"	Yes	The Complete Season Four	
"Feliz Navidad"	José Feliciano	Artie Abrams	10. "Glee, Actually"	Yes	The Christmas Album Volume 3	
"White Christmas"	Bing Crosby with Ken Darby and John Scott Trotter	Blaine Anderson and Kurt Hummel	10. "Glee, Actually"	Yes	The Christmas Album Volume 3	
"Oh Hanukkah"	Barenaked Ladies	Jake Puckerman and Noah Puckerman	10. "Glee, Actually"	Yes	The Christmas Album Volume 3	
"Jingle Bell Rock"	Bobby Helms	Sam Evans with the McKinley High Cheerios	10. "Glee, Actually"	Yes	The Christmas Album Volume 3	
"The First Noël"	Traditional	Marley Rose	10. "Glee, Actually"	Yes	The Christmas Album Volume 3	
"Have Yourself a Merry Little Christmas"	Judy Garland	Marley Rose, Noah Puckerman, Jake Puckerman, Sam Evans, Brittany Pierce, Blaine Anderson and Kurt Hummel with Finn Hudson and New Directions	10. "Glee, Actually"	Yes	The Christmas Album Volume 3	
"I Don't Know How to Love Him"	Jesus Christ Superstar	Tina Cohen-Chang	11. "Sadie Hawkins"	Yes	The Complete Season Four	
"Baby Got Back"	Jonathan Coulton	Adam's Apples	11. "Sadie Hawkins"	Yes	The Complete Season Four	
"Tell Him"	The Exciters	Marley Rose and Brittany Pierce with New Directions females	11. "Sadie Hawkins"	Yes	The Complete Season Four	
"No Scrubs"	TLC	Artie Abrams, Blaine Anderson, Ryder Lynn, Sam Evans and Joe Hart	11. "Sadie Hawkins"	Yes	The Complete Season Four	
"Locked Out of Heaven"	Bruno Mars	Marley Rose and Unique Adams with Tina Cohen-Chang, Sugar Motta and Brittany Pierce	11. "Sadie Hawkins"	Yes	The Complete Season Four	
"I Only Have Eyes for You"	The Flamingos	Ryder Lynn with Artie Abrams and Joe Hart	11. "Sadie Hawkins"	Yes	The Complete Season Four	
"Torn"	Natalie Imbruglia	Rachel Berry	12. "Naked"	Yes	The Complete Season Four	
"Centerfold" / "Hot in Herre"	The J. Geils Band / Nelly	Sam Evans, Jake Puckerman, Ryder Lynn, and Kitty Wilde with Blaine Anderson, Joe Hart and the McKinley High Cheerios	12. "Naked"	Yes	The Complete Season Four	
"A Thousand Years"	Christina Perri	Marley Rose and Jake Puckerman	12. "Naked"	Yes	The Complete Season Four	
"Let Me Love You (Until You Learn to Love Yourself)"	Ne-Yo	Jake Puckerman	12. "Naked"	Yes	The Complete Season Four	
"Love Song"	Sara Bareilles	Rachel Berry, Quinn Fabray and Santana Lopez	12. "Naked"	Yes	The Complete Season Four	
"This Is the New Year"	A Great Big World	New Directions	12. "Naked"	Yes	The Complete Season Four	
"Diva"	Beyoncé	Unique Adams, Brittany Pierce and Tina Cohen-Chang with Blaine Anderson, Marley Rose and Kitty Wilde	13. "Diva"	Yes	The Complete Season Four	
"Don't Stop Me Now"	Queen	Blaine Anderson with New Directions	13. "Diva"	Yes	The Complete Season Four	
"Nutbush City Limits"	Ike & Tina Turner	Santana Lopez with Louisville cheerleaders	13. "Diva"	Yes	The Complete Season Four	
"Make No Mistake, She's Mine"	Kenny Rogers and Ronnie Milsap	Santana Lopez and Sam Evans	13. "Diva"	Yes	The Complete Season Four	
"Bring Him Home"	Les Misérables	Kurt Hummel and Rachel Berry	13. "Diva"	Yes	The Complete Season Four	
"Hung Up"	Madonna	Tina Cohen-Chang	13. "Diva"	Yes	The Complete Season Four	
"Girl on Fire"	Alicia Keys	Santana Lopez	13. "Diva"	Yes	The Complete Season Four	
"You're All I Need to Get By"	Marvin Gaye and Tammi Terrell	Jake Puckerman and Marley Rose with Artie Abrams, Sam Evans and Ryder Lynn	14. "I Do"	Yes	The Complete Season Four	
"Getting Married Today"	Company	Will Schuester, Emma Pillsbury and Mercedes Jones with the wedding congregation	14. "I Do"	Yes	The Complete Season Four	
"Just Can't Get Enough"	Depeche Mode	Blaine Anderson and Kurt Hummel with Brittany Pierce and Marley Rose	14. "I Do"	Yes	The Complete Season Four	
"We've Got Tonite"	Kenny Rogers and Sheena Easton	Finn Hudson, Rachel Berry, Kurt Hummel, Blaine Anderson, Marley Rose, Jake Puckerman, Quinn Fabray, Santana Lopez, Artie Abrams and Betty Pillsbury	14. "I Do"	Yes	The Complete Season Four	
"Anything Could Happen"	Ellie Goulding	Marley Rose, Artie Abrams and Jake Puckerman with New Directions	14. "I Do"	Yes	The Complete Season Four	
"You're All the World to Me"	Royal Wedding	Will Schuester and Emma Pillsbury	15. "Girls (and Boys) On Film"	Yes	The Complete Season Four	
"Shout"	The Isley Brothers	Blaine Anderson and Brittany Pierce with New Directions	15. "Girls (and Boys) On Film"	Yes	The Complete Season Four	
"Come What May"	Nicole Kidman and Ewan McGregor	Blaine Anderson and Kurt Hummel	15. "Girls (and Boys) On Film"	Yes	The Complete Season Four	
"Old Time Rock and Roll" / "Danger Zone"	Bob Seger / Kenny Loggins	Blaine Anderson and Sam Evans with New Directions males	15. "Girls (and Boys) On Film"	Yes	The Complete Season Four	
"Diamonds Are a Girl's Best Friend" / "Material Girl"	Marilyn Monroe / Madonna	Unique Adams and Marley Rose with New Directions females	15. "Girls (and Boys) On Film"	Yes	The Complete Season Four	
"In Your Eyes"	Peter Gabriel	Will Schuester with New Directions	15. "Girls (and Boys) On Film"	Yes	The Complete Season Four	
"Unchained Melody"	The Righteous Brothers	Jake Puckerman and Ryder Lynn	15. "Girls (and Boys) On Film"	Yes	The Complete Season Four	
"Footloose"	Kenny Loggins	Sam Evans and Artie Abrams with New Directions	15. "Girls (and Boys) On Film"	Yes	The Complete Season Four	
"How to Be a Heartbreaker"	Marina and the Diamonds	Brody Weston and Rachel Berry with escorts and female clients	16. "Feud"	Yes	The Complete Season Four	
"The Bitch Is Back" / "Dress You Up"	Elton John / Madonna	Ryder Lynn and Unique Adams with New Directions	16. "Feud"	Yes	The Complete Season Four	
"Cold Hearted"	Paula Abdul	Santana Lopez with NYADA students	16. "Feud"	Yes	The Complete Season Four	
"Bye Bye Bye" / "I Want It That Way"	'N Sync / Backstreet Boys	Will Schuester and Finn Hudson with New Directions males	16. "Feud"	Yes	The Complete Season Four	
"I Still Believe" / "Super Bass"	Mariah Carey / Nicki Minaj	Blaine Anderson and Sue Sylvester with the McKinley High Cheerios	16. "Feud"	Yes	The Complete Season Four	
"Closer"	Tegan and Sara	Ryder Lynn and Jake Puckerman with New Directions	16. "Feud"	Yes	The Complete Season Four	
"Wake Me Up Before You Go-Go"	Wham!	Blaine Anderson and Sam Evans with New Directions	17. "Guilty Pleasures"	Yes	The Complete Season Four	
"Copacabana"	Barry Manilow	Sam Evans with New Directions	17. "Guilty Pleasures"	Yes	The Complete Season Four	
"Against All Odds (Take a Look at Me Now)"	Phil Collins	Blaine Anderson	17. "Guilty Pleasures"	Yes	The Complete Season Four	
"Wannabe"	Spice Girls	New Directions females	17. "Guilty Pleasures"	Yes	The Complete Season Four	
"My Prerogative"	Bobby Brown	Jake Puckerman with New Directions	17. "Guilty Pleasures"	Yes	The Complete Season Four	
"Creep"	Radiohead	Brody Weston and Rachel Berry	17. "Guilty Pleasures"	Yes	The Complete Season Four	
"Mamma Mia"	ABBA	Rachel Berry, Santana Lopez, Kitty Wilde, Marley Rose, Sam Evans, Blaine Anderson and Unique Adams with Kurt Hummel and New Directions	17. "Guilty Pleasures"	Yes	The Complete Season Four	
"Your Song"	Elton John	Ryder Lynn	18. "Shooting Star"	Yes	The Complete Season Four	
"More Than Words"	Extreme	Sam Evans and Brittany Pierce with New Directions	18. "Shooting Star"	Yes	The Complete Season Four	
"Say"	John Mayer	New Directions	18. "Shooting Star"	Yes	The Complete Season Four	
"Next to Me"	Emeli Sandé	Shelby Corcoran and Rachel Berry	19. "Sweet Dreams"	Yes	The Complete Season Four	
"(You Gotta) Fight for Your Right (To Party!)"	Beastie Boys	Finn Hudson and Noah Puckerman with fraternity partygoers	19. "Sweet Dreams"	Yes	The Complete Season Four	
"You Have More Friends Than You Know"	Jeff Marx	Marley Rose, Blaine Anderson, Unique Adams and Sam Evans	19. "Sweet Dreams"	Yes	The Complete Season Four	
"Don't Stop Believin'"	Journey	Rachel Berry with original New Directions	19. "Sweet Dreams"	Yes	The Complete Season Four	
"Outcast"	Original composition	Marley Rose, Jake Puckerman, Unique Adams and Ryder Lynn with New Directions	19. "Sweet Dreams"	Yes	The Complete Season Four	
"The Star-Spangled Banner"	Traditional	Frida Romero	20. "Lights Out"	No	No	
"You've Lost That Lovin' Feelin'"	The Righteous Brothers	Sam Evans and Ryder Lynn with New Directions	20. "Lights Out"	Yes	The Complete Season Four	
"Everybody Hurts"	R.E.M.	Ryder Lynn	20. "Lights Out"	Yes	The Complete Season Four	
"We Will Rock You"	Queen	New Directions	20. "Lights Out"	Yes	The Complete Season Four	
"Little Girls"	Annie	Sue Sylvester	20. "Lights Out"	Yes	The Complete Season Four	
"At the Ballet"	A Chorus Line	Santana Lopez, Kurt Hummel, Rachel Berry and Isabelle Wright	20. "Lights Out"	Yes	The Complete Season Four	
"The Longest Time"	Billy Joel	Artie Abrams, Kitty Wilde, Sam Evans, Marley Rose, Ryder Lynn and Jake Puckerman with New Directions	20. "Lights Out"	Yes	The Complete Season Four	
"Signed, Sealed, Delivered I'm Yours"	Stevie Wonder	Kitty Wilde with New Directions	21. "Wonder-ful"	Yes	The Complete Season Four	
"Superstition"	Stevie Wonder	Mercedes Jones, Marley Rose and Blaine Anderson with New Directions	21. "Wonder-ful"	Yes	The Complete Season Four	
"You Are the Sunshine of My Life"	Stevie Wonder	Kurt Hummel with Tina Cohen-Chang, Marley Rose and Kitty Wilde	21. "Wonder-ful"	Yes	The Complete Season Four	
"I Wish"	Stevie Wonder	Jake Puckerman with Mike Chang, Marley Rose and New Directions	21. "Wonder-ful"	Yes	The Complete Season Four	
"Uptight (Everything's Alright)"	Stevie Wonder	Cassandra July with NYADA students	21. "Wonder-ful"	Yes	The Complete Season Four	
"Higher Ground"	Stevie Wonder	Mercedes Jones	21. "Wonder-ful"	Yes	The Complete Season Four	
"For Once in My Life"	Stevie Wonder	Artie Abrams with Kitty Wilde, Blaine Anderson, Tina Cohen-Chang, Ryder Lynn, Sam Evans, Marley Rose, Unique Adams and New Directions	21. "Wonder-ful"	Yes	The Complete Season Four	
"To Love You More"	Celine Dion	Rachel Berry	22. "All or Nothing"	Yes	The Complete Season Four	
"Rainbow Connection"	Kermit the Frog	The Waffletoots	22. "All or Nothing"	Yes	The Complete Season Four	
"Clarity"	Zedd feat. Foxes	Frida Romero and The Hoosierdaddies	22. "All or Nothing"	Yes	The Complete Season Four	
"Wings"	Little Mix	Frida Romero and The Hoosierdaddies	22. "All or Nothing"	Yes	The Complete Season Four	
"Hall of Fame"	The Script feat. will.i.am	Jake Puckerman, Ryder Lynn, Sam Evans, Joe Hart and Artie Abrams with New Directions	22. "All or Nothing"	Yes	The Complete Season Four	
"I Love It"	Icona Pop feat. Charli XCX	Tina Cohen-Chang, Kitty Wilde, Marley Rose, Unique Adams, Sugar Motta and Brittany Pierce with New Directions	22. "All or Nothing"	Yes	The Complete Season Four	
"All or Nothing"	Original composition	Marley Rose and Blaine Anderson with New Directions	22. "All or Nothing"	Yes	The Complete Season Four	

== See also ==
- List of songs in Glee (season 1)
- List of songs in Glee (season 2)
- List of songs in Glee (season 3)
- List of songs in Glee (season 5)
- List of songs in Glee (season 6)
- Glee albums discography
