= Glee, Actually =

- Glee episode
- Episode no.: Season 4 Episode 10
- Directed by: Adam Shankman
- Written by: Matthew Hodgson
- Production code: 4ARC10
- Original air date: December 13, 2012

Guest appearances
- Jessalyn Gilsig as Terri Schuester; Mike O'Malley as Burt Hummel; Dot-Marie Jones as Shannon Beiste; Aisha Tyler as Jake's mother; Gina Hecht as Mrs. Puckerman; Melissa Benoist as Marley Rose; Jacob Artist as Jake Puckerman; Becca Tobin as Kitty Wilde; Blake Jenner as Ryder Lynn; Damian McGinty as Rory Flanagan; Samuel Larsen as Joe Hart; Lauren Potter as Becky Jackson; Trisha Rae Stahl as Millie Rose

Episode chronology
← Previous "Swan Song"	Next → "Sadie Hawkins"
- Glee season 4

"Glee, Actually" is the tenth episode of the fourth season of the American musical television series Glee, and the seventy-sixth episode overall as well as the show's third and last canonical Christmas-themed episode. Written by Matthew Hodgson and directed by Adam Shankman, it aired on Fox in the United States on December 13, 2012.

The episode garnered mixed reviews from critics; and was watched by 5.26 million viewers, receiving an 18-49 rating of 2.0.

== Plot ==
Artie Abrams (Kevin McHale) injures himself on an icy wheelchair ramp at McKinley High. Finn Hudson (Cory Monteith) helps him to the school nurse's office, where Artie tells Finn he wishes that the accident that paralyzed him had never happened. Artie falls asleep in the nurse's office and enters a dream sequence inspired by It's a Wonderful Life. In the dream, as explained by his guide Rory Flanagan (Damian McGinty), Artie was never paralyzed and as a result many of the events as he knows them never took place. The glee club never got off the ground, and Will Schuester (Matthew Morrison) has become an apathetic alcoholic under the control of his wife, Terri Schuester (Jessalyn Gilsig). Kurt Hummel (Chris Colfer) is bullied by jocks – including several of the glee club members – because of his homosexuality, and as a result never graduated from high school. Rachel Berry (Lea Michele) works as a librarian in the school library, having never had a chance to be a star. Becky Jackson (Lauren Potter) is the school slut because she was never treated with respect because Artie never took her on a date. Artie gathers the glee club as he knows it and performs "Feliz Navidad" in an attempt to inspire them to establish a glee club, but fails. Last, Rory informs Artie that Quinn Fabray (Dianna Agron) never managed to recover from her car accident, which happened regardless of her participation in the glee club, and, since she didn't have the support of her friends, died of a broken heart. Rory explains to Artie that Artie is the heart and soul of the glee club, and Artie wakes up from the dream with a better appreciation of his role in the club.

Burt Hummel (Mike O'Malley) surprises Kurt and Rachel by showing up at their New York apartment. Burt explains to Rachel the significance of Christmas in Kurt's life, especially after the death of Kurt's mother. Rachel goes on a cruise, while the Hummels continue to bond in New York. Burt reveals to Kurt that he has prostate cancer, but it was diagnosed at an early stage and his chances for survival are very high. Burt then surprises Kurt again by revealing that he has paid for Blaine Anderson (Darren Criss) to travel to New York to spend Christmas with them. They have an awkward but cordial reunion, and sing "White Christmas". Back at the apartment, Burt, Kurt, and Blaine continue several of the Hummels' Christmas traditions, and have dinner.

Noah "Puck" Puckerman (Mark Salling) invites Jake Puckerman (Jacob Artist) to travel to Los Angeles with him. Puck tries to impress Jake with the lifestyle he lives in Los Angeles, but when the actual owner of the house where Puck told Jake he had been living returns home and kicks them out, Puck admits he has been lying about his lifestyle. The brothers return to Lima and later have a Hanukkah dinner at Breadstix, together with their respective mothers. The dinner goes badly at first, as the two women resent each other, but Puck and Jake convince their mothers that all four of them have a common bond: they were all placed into a difficult situation by Puck and Jake's father. The women begin to talk and soon start to bond. Puck informs Jake that he will be staying in Lima, while he works on a screenplay.

Brittany Pierce (Heather Morris) and Sam Evans (Chord Overstreet) reveal to each other that they believe in the 2012 Mayan apocalypse. Believing that the world is about to end, Brittany cashes out her savings and gives her friends expensive gifts, and Sam proposes to Brittany. Coach Shannon Beiste (Dot-Marie Jones) performs the wedding ceremony. When the apocalypse does not occur as expected, Sam and Brittany realize that they are still married, and meet Coach Beiste at Breadstix to ask for help. Beiste reveals that she is not actually qualified to perform weddings, and that they are not officially married. She did this because she didn't really want them to get married. Both Brittany and Sam are disappointed that the world didn't end, but they realized that it felt good being nice to others. Coach Beiste, feeling sorry for them, pretended that an archaeologist named Indiana Jones found a Mayan calendar predicting that the world would end on September 27, 2014. This lifted Brittany and Sam's spirits, who were delighted to find out that there was still time to tell others how they felt.

After failing to satisfy Becky with her Christmas gifts, Sue Sylvester (Jane Lynch) draws Millie Rose's (Trisha Rae Stahl) name in a Secret Santa event held among the McKinley High faculty and staff. Unsure what to get Millie, Sue happens upon a conversation between Millie and her daughter Marley Rose (Melissa Benoist). Marley wants to have a Christmas tree and at least some gifts, but Millie explains that they need to save money to pay a counselor to treat Marley for her eating disorder. After seeing this, Sue breaks into the Roses' home that night and surreptitiously leaves them a Christmas tree, several presents, and enough money to pay Marley's counselor. Becky reveals to Millie that Sue was behind the surprise when bribed by candy and Millie attempts to return the money, but Sue insists that Millie keep it. Millie then brings Sue to the auditorium, where several of the glee club members including Marley sing "Have Yourself a Merry Little Christmas", joined in unison by the four glee clubbers singing in Breadstix and the two singing in the New York apartment.

== Production ==
Guest star Aisha Tyler appears in this episode as the mother of Jake Puckerman. Recurring guest stars include Kurt's father Burt Hummel (O'Malley), Will's ex-wife Terri Schuester (Gilsig), former glee club member Rory Flanagan (McGinty), football coach Shannon Beiste (Jones), glee club members Joe Hart (Samuel Larsen), Marley Rose (Benoist), Jake Puckerman (Artist), Kitty Wilde (Becca Tobin) and Ryder Lynn (Blake Jenner), cheerleader Becky Jackson (Potter), Puck's mother (Gina Hecht) and Marley's mother, whose first name is revealed to be Millie in this episode (Trisha Rae Stahl).

This episode includes six songs, all of which were released on the soundtrack album Glee: The Music, The Christmas Album, Volume 3 on December 11, 2012. The songs are José Feliciano's "Feliz Navidad" performed by McHale, the Irving Berlin classic "White Christmas" performed by Criss and Colfer, the traditional song "Hanukkah, Oh Hanukkah" performed by Artist and Salling, Bobby Helms' "Jingle Bell Rock" performed by Overstreet, the traditional carol "The First Noël" performed by Benoist, and "Have Yourself a Merry Little Christmas", originally from the MGM film Meet Me in St. Louis, performed by Benoist, Salling, Artist, Overstreet, Morris, Criss, Colfer, and the glee club members.

== Reception ==
=== Ratings ===
The episode was watched by 5.26 million American viewers, and received a 2.0/5 rating/share among adults 18–49. The show placed third in its timeslot behind Grey's Anatomy and Person of Interest. With DVR numbers, the episode was watched by 2.59 million viewers with a 2.0 rating, totaling 7.85 million viewers and a 3.2 rating.

=== Reviews ===
The episode received mixed reviews from critics. Laurel Brown of Zap2it gave the episode a mixed review, and wrote, "If you were hoping (like me) that Glee would pay homage to the brilliance of Love, Actually in its holiday-themed 'Glee, Actually', you may have been sorely disappointed." She criticized the Marley storyline calling it "a bit of a snooze", but called Artie's dream segment "a strong (if insane) segment". The storyline that featured Kurt and Burt was characterized as "cheesy", though she called the Hummel duo and Blaine "just so darn sweet!"

Rae Votta of Billboard also gave the episode a mixed review, and noted, "The one truth of Glee is the Christmas episode always involves a plethora of holiday sweet with just a dash of WTF."

== Music ==
=== Performances ===
The songs performed in the episode were all featured on the Christmas album Glee: The Music, The Christmas Album, Volume 3, which was released December 11, 2012. Therefore, the songs were not sold as singles.

=== Chart history ===
The Christmas album debuted at number 20 on the US Billboard 200 chart.
