= Glease =

- Glee episode
- Episode no.: Season 4 Episode 6
- Directed by: Michael Uppendahl
- Written by: Roberto Aguirre-Sacasa
- Production code: 4ARC06
- Original air date: November 15, 2012

Guest appearances
- Kate Hudson as Cassandra July; Iqbal Theba as Principal Figgins; Naya Rivera as Santana Lopez; Vanessa Lengies as Sugar Motta; Alex Newell as Wade "Unique" Adams; Samuel Larsen as Joe Hart; Melissa Benoist as Marley Rose; Blake Jenner as Ryder Lynn; Jacob Artist as Jake Puckerman; Becca Tobin as Kitty Wilde; Dean Geyer as Brody Weston; Trisha Rae Stahl as Millie Rose; Mark Christopher Lawrence as Rob Adams; Davenia McFadden as Betty Adams

Episode chronology
← Previous "The Role You Were Born to Play"	Next → "Dynamic Duets"
- Glee season 4

"Glease" is the sixth episode of the fourth season of the American musical television series Glee, and the seventy-second episode overall. It aired on Fox in the United States on November 15, 2012, and features the McKinley High production of the musical Grease, and the return of special guest star Kate Hudson as Cassandra July. Kurt and Rachel have awkward reunions with their exes, Will prepares to leave for his vacation and puts Finn in charge of the Glee Club while he is gone. Rachel and Kurt sever ties with their respective exes and leave at the end.

== Plot ==
With the McKinley production of Grease approaching, Will Schuester (Matthew Morrison) names Finn Hudson (Cory Monteith) as interim director of New Directions during his sabbatical in Washington, D.C. Cheerleading coach Sue Sylvester (Jane Lynch) opposes, citing Finn's age and lack of qualifications, but Principal Figgins (Iqbal Theba) agrees, which angers Sue. Finn later apologizes to Sue for the insensitive comment he made about her daughter, but she rejects his apologies and declares her truce with the glee club to be over. In order to sabotage the play, Sue reserves the school auditorium for the Cheerios, preventing New Directions from practicing there. Forced to find a new rehearsal venue, he invites the male glee club members to rehearse at Burt Hummel's auto repair shop, where Ryder Lynn (Blake Jenner) and Sam Evans (Chord Overstreet) lead them in a rendition of "Greased Lightnin'".

In New York City, Rachel Berry (Lea Michele) tells her friend Brody Weston (Dean Geyer) that she has landed an audition for an off-Broadway production. Though dance instructor Cassandra July (Kate Hudson) attempts to dissuade her, Rachel remains determined and asks Cassandra to audition with her. Later, Rachel and Kurt Hummel (Chris Colfer) discuss whether or not to return to Lima to support their friends in the musical in the wake of their recent breakups with Finn and Blaine Anderson (Darren Criss), respectively. Overhearing their discussion, Cassandra convinces them to go and gives her frequent flyer miles to them.

Back at McKinley, Kitty Wilde (Becca Tobin) surreptitiously tampers with Marley Rose's (Melissa Benoist) costume, and convinces Marley that she is genetically predisposed to be overweight like her mother (Trisha Rae Stahl). Later, during a sleepover at her house, Kitty convinces Marley that she needs to induce vomit in order to maintain a healthy weight, and sings "Look At Me, I'm Sandra Dee" to mock Marley. Meanwhile, Sue continues her efforts to sabotage the play by convincing the parents of Wade "Unique" Adams (Alex Newell) that it is not a good idea for him to perform the female role of Rizzo. However, Sue's plan backfires when Finn enlists Glee club graduate Santana Lopez (Naya Rivera) to replace Wade, despite current student Tina Cohen-Chang (Jenna Ushkowitz) being willing to step in.

Arriving in Lima, Rachel and Kurt have an awkward reunion with Finn and Blaine. Blaine later performs "Beauty School Dropout", followed by Santana, who performs "There Are Worse Things I Could Do". Ryder finds Marley trying to vomit in the bathroom. He convinces her that she looks good and that it is not healthy to induce vomit, and kisses her backstage as Jake Puckerman (Jacob Artist) looks on. Marley and Ryder sing their rendition of "You're the One That I Want", while Rachel imagines herself performing with Finn and her friends. She calls Brody for support, only to learn that Cassandra has seduced him in order to spite Rachel. Finn finds Rachel crying and attempts to comfort her, however, once he learns she is crying over Brody they decide to sever all ties. Kurt also refuses to speak with Blaine and leaves with Rachel, both claiming that McKinley is no longer their home.

At the choir room, New Directions celebrates the positive reviews of "Grease" and Will says his goodbyes to the glee club before leaving, and Finn officially takes over.

== Production ==
"Glease" is the third time Glee has featured the high school production of a Broadway musical, following on the second season's The Rocky Horror Show, which was ultimately not performed before an audience, and the third season's West Side Story, which was.

Recurring characters in this episode include NYADA dance instructor Cassandra July played by special guest star Kate Hudson, glee club members Sugar Motta (Vanessa Lengies), Joe Hart (Samuel Larsen), Wade "Unique" Adams (Alex Newell), Marley Rose (Benoist) and Jake Puckerman (Jacob Artist), Principal Figgins (Iqbal Theba), football player Ryder Lynn (Jenner), cheerleader Kitty Wilde (Tobin), NYADA junior Brody Weston (Dean Geyer), and McKinley's lunch lady and Marley's mother Mrs. Rose (Trisha Rae Stahl).

All of the songs from the episode are included on the EP Glee: The Music Presents Glease, which was released on November 6, 2012. They were not released separately as singles. The songs, all from Grease, include "There Are Worse Things I Could Do", which features Hudson, "You're the One That I Want" performed by Benoist, Jenner, Monteith and Michele, and "Look at Me, I'm Sandra Dee" featuring Tobin.
