= The Break Up (Glee) =

- Glee episode
- Episode no.: Season 4 Episode 4
- Directed by: Alfonso Gomez-Rejon
- Written by: Ryan Murphy
- Production code: 4ARC04
- Original air date: October 4, 2012

Guest appearances
- Jayma Mays as Emma Pillsbury; Alex Newell as Wade "Unique" Adams; Samuel Larsen as Joe Hart; Melissa Benoist as Marley Rose; Dean Geyer as Brody Weston; Jacob Artist as Jake Puckerman; Becca Tobin as Kitty Wilde; Dan Domenech as Chase Madison

Episode chronology
← Previous "Makeover"	Next → "The Role You Were Born to Play"
- Glee season 4

"The Break Up" is the fourth episode of the fourth season of the American musical television series Glee, and the seventieth episode overall. Written by Ryan Murphy and directed by Alfonso Gomez-Rejon, it aired on Fox in the United States on October 4, 2012, and features the end of several long-established romantic relationships on the show: the couples Finn and Rachel, Kurt and Blaine, and Santana and Brittany all break up.

== Plot ==
In New York City, Rachel Berry (Lea Michele) reunites with her former fiancé, Finn Hudson (Cory Monteith), who has been discharged from the Army, and gives him a tour through the New York Academy of Dramatic Arts (NYADA), causing Finn to feel out of place. Meanwhile, in Lima, Blaine Anderson (Darren Criss), feeling neglected by his boyfriend, Kurt Hummel (Chris Colfer), who is busy with his work at Vogue.com, cheats on him. Finn and Blaine sing Duncan Sheik's "Barely Breathing" and Blaine, feeling guilty, decides to surprise Kurt by visiting him in New York City.

Finn, Rachel, Kurt and Blaine attend a local bar where NYADA students meet, and where Finn runs into Brody Weston (Dean Geyer). Suspicious of his and Rachel's relationship, Finn encourages them to sing Demi Lovato's "Give Your Heart a Break" together. They are followed by Blaine, who performs a heartfelt acoustic version of Katy Perry's "Teenage Dream." Outside, Finn and Kurt confront Rachel and Blaine, and Rachel admits to kissing Brody, while Blaine admits to cheating on Kurt, leading to them singing No Doubt's "Don't Speak" as they return to Rachel and Kurt's apartment.

The following day, Finn leaves without telling Rachel and returns to Lima, where he visits glee club director Will Schuester (Matthew Morrison) and breaks down in his arms. Finn is introduced to the new members of New Directions and suggests that they perform Grease for the school musical, which impresses Will. Will later tells Emma Pillsbury (Jayma Mays), that he has been accepted to the blue ribbon government panel to improve arts education nationwide, but that it requires him to move to Washington, D.C. for six months. Emma is reluctant to leave Lima for such a long time to accompany Will, and they argue, but do not break up.

Santana Lopez (Naya Rivera) visits her girlfriend, Brittany Pierce (Heather Morris), and learns that she joined a club created by cheerleader Kitty Wilde (Becca Tobin) to prepare for the Rapture. Kitty's boyfriend, Jake Puckerman (Jacob Artist), invites Marley Rose (Melissa Benoist) to one of the meetings, but becomes disappointed when Kitty uses it to play a harmful prank on one of the members. Jake eventually decides to break up with Kitty after she mistreats Marley, but also ignores Marley's romantic advances.

Santana serenades Brittany with Taylor Swift's "Mine" and confides with Brittany that their relationship isn't working due to the long distance and her new priorities. She and Brittany break up, which leaves Brittany devastated. Blaine continuously attempts to contact Kurt, but Kurt won't communicate with him, and he becomes uncertain of where they're standing.

Rachel, having flown all the way to Lima, confronts Finn at the McKinley auditorium, where she calls him immature and a coward for hiding from her for months. She says she loves him, but states that she can't keep their current relationship up, and she breaks up with him despite Finn's claims that he was giving her freedom. She gives him a last kiss, and leaves. After she leaves, Finn performs Coldplay's "The Scientist" alone, and imagines that Rachel, Kurt, Blaine, Santana, Brittany, Will and Emma are there performing with him.

== Production ==
In a July 2012 interview with E! News, Colfer elaborated in regard to the progression of the Kurt-Blaine relationship in the show's fourth season. Colfer said, "I would like to do something besides say 'I love you,' and I think Darren [Criss] and I agree on that. We're ready for the next step. They've been together for a while. Let's throw some spice and drama into that." Colfer quipped that he did not know what was in store for the couple, "I hear mixed things. I hear they're still together but then maybe they're breaking up." In a September 2012 interview with the same publication, on whether the couple would break up or not in the show's fourth season, Criss stated, "I don't know. We still have episodes to shoot." Criss ultimately echoed Colfer's sentiment, "We're like an old married couple now. Let's shake it up!" Prior to the episode's debut, series co-creator Ryan Murphy dubbed it "the best episode we have ever done".

Scenes from the episode were filmed on location in New York City the weekend of August 11 and 12, 2012, including the walk through the park for the song "Don't Speak".

Recurring characters in this episode include McKinley guidance counselor Emma Pillsbury (Mays), glee club members Joe Hart (Samuel Larsen), Wade "Unique" Adams (Alex Newell), Marley Rose (Benoist) and Jake Puckerman (Artist), cheerleader Kitty (Tobin), NYADA junior Brody Weston (Geyer) and Vogue.com employee Chase Madison (Dan Domenech).

Six songs are being released as singles, including Duncan Sheik's "Barely Breathing" performed by Criss and Monteith, No Doubt's "Don't Speak" performed by Colfer, Criss, Monteith and Michele, Coldplay's "The Scientist" performed by Monteith, Michele, Colfer, Criss, Rivera, Morris, Morrison and Mays, Demi Lovato's "Give Your Heart a Break" performed by Michele and Geyer, Taylor Swift's "Mine" performed by Rivera, and an acoustic version of Katy Perry's "Teenage Dream" performed by Criss.
