= Feud (Glee) =

- Glee episode
- Episode no.: Season 4 Episode 16
- Directed by: Bradley Buecker
- Written by: Roberto Aguirre-Sacasa
- Production code: 4ARC16
- Original air date: March 14, 2013

Guest appearances
- Blake Jenner as Ryder Lynn; Jacob Artist as Jake Puckerman; Alex Newell as Wade "Unique" Adams; Becca Tobin as Kitty Wilde; Dean Geyer as Brody Weston; Lauren Potter as Becky Jackson; Melissa Benoist as Marley Rose; Ginny Gardner as Katie Fitzgerald

Episode chronology
← Previous "Girls (and Boys) On Film"	Next → "Guilty Pleasures"
- Glee season 4

"Feud" is the sixteenth episode of the fourth season of the American musical television series Glee, and the eighty-second episode overall. Written by Roberto Aguirre-Sacasa and directed by Bradley Buecker, it aired on Fox in the United States on March 14, 2013.

== Plot ==
In New York City, Rachel Berry (Lea Michele) confirms that she is not pregnant, and Santana Lopez (Naya Rivera) remains convinced that Brody Weston (Dean Geyer) is hiding something. Unbeknownst to them, he is moonlighting as a gigolo to pay his NYADA tuition.

In Lima, New Directions, noticing tension between Will Schuester (Matthew Morrison) and Finn Hudson (Cory Monteith) (Finn kissed Will's fiancé in Diva), decides to assign them a week of songs covering musical feuds. Wade "Unique" Adams (Alex Newell) confronts Ryder Lynn (Blake Jenner) over interfering in the relationship between Marley Rose (Melissa Benoist) and Jake Puckerman (Jacob Artist), and they fight after Ryder refers to Unique as a boy. Artie Abrams (Kevin McHale) suggests that they express their feelings through song, and they duet on "The Bitch Is Back" and "Dress You Up", but Ryder still struggles to accept Unique as a girl. Meanwhile, Marley reconciles with Jake, but he acts hostile towards Ryder for betraying him by kissing Marley.

In NYC, Santana confronts Brody at NYADA, performing "Cold Hearted" to mock him. Upon learning about this, Rachel and Kurt Hummel (Chris Colfer) kick Santana out of their apartment. In Lima, Will and Finn duet on "Bye Bye Bye" and "I Want It That Way", and although Will forgives Finn, he tells Finn that their relationship can never be the same. Marley later convinces Finn that he is a natural leader and encourages him to get a teacher's degree. Santana eventually discovers Brody's secret and calls Finn, who travels to NYC and confronts Brody in a motel, threatening to tell Rachel the truth if Brody doesn't leave her alone. When Brody attempts to prevent Finn from leaving, they get into a fight, with Finn beating Brody and saying "Stay away from my future wife!"

Cheerleading coach Sue Sylvester (Jane Lynch) attempts to force Blaine Anderson (Darren Criss) to rejoin the Cheerios, and after he refuses, she initiates a series of attacks on his personal life. Blaine challenges Sue to a duel, and they sing "I Still Believe" and "Super Bass". Sue is elected the winner and welcomes Blaine into the Cheerios, naming him co-captain alongside Becky Jackson (Lauren Potter), unaware that this is part of Blaine and Sam Evans's (Chord Overstreet) plan to prevent Sue from further threatening the glee club once they graduate.

Ryder begins chatting online with a girl named Katie Fitzgerald (Ginny Gardner), who convinces him to make amends with his friends. Ryder calls Marley, Jake, and Unique and apologizes to them. They are joined by Kitty Wilde (Becca Tobin), who reminds them that, after the seniors graduate, they'll be taking over glee club. Ryder and Jake lead New Directions in a performance of "Closer" to celebrate their strengthened bond, and Ryder later messages Katie to thank her. However, when he asks if they can meet, he hears typing coming from the school library before Katie mysteriously goes offline.

== Production ==
The episode was written by Glee producer Roberto Aguirre-Sacasa and directed by co-executive producer Bradley Buecker.

Recurring characters in this episode include glee club members Wade "Unique" Adams (Newell), Marley Rose (Benoist), Jake Puckerman (Artist), Kitty Wilde (Tobin) and Ryder Lynn (Jenner), cheerleader Becky Jackson (Lauren Potter) and NYADA junior Brody Weston (Geyer).

Nine songs from the episode are being released as six singles. These include three mash-ups, NSYNC's "Bye Bye Bye" with Backstreet Boys' "I Want It That Way" performed by Morrison and Monteith, Elton John's "The Bitch Is Back" with Madonna's "Dress You Up" sung by Jenner and Newell, and Mariah Carey's "I Still Believe" with Nicki Minaj's "Super Bass" performed by Criss and Lynch, and the individual songs Tegan and Sara's "Closer" sung by Jenner and Artist, Marina and the Diamonds' "How to Be a Heartbreaker" performed by Geyer and Michele, and Paula Abdul's "Cold Hearted" performed by Rivera.

== Reception ==
=== Ratings ===
The episode was watched by 5.37 million American viewers and received a 2.0/6 rating/share among adults 18–49. The show finished third in its timeslot against Person of Interest and Grey's Anatomy. This was a decrease from the previous episode "Girls (and Boys) On Film", which was watched by 6.72 million viewers and received a 2.4/7 rating/share among adults 18–49.

2.73 million viewers watched this episode via DVR, bringing the total viewership to 8.10 million and a 3.2 18-49 rating.

=== Critical reception ===
Tierney Bricker of E! Online praised Will and Finn's "boy-band off", saying "'Twas awesome!" She also complimented Finn's realized dream and confrontation with Brody. She ranked this episode as one of Thursday's "Best TV Moments."

Erin Strecker of Entertainment Weekly was less thrilled about Will and Finn's musical performance, saying "The number was 100% ridiculous but honestly had 100% of the things I wanted to see once I heard the song happening. Schu on strings! Schu with JT hair! The girls being crazed fans!" Erin complimented Finn and Will's storyline, but then said "Perhaps because the plotline was so serious, the rest of the episode was completely silly", specifically talking about Blaine's subplot.

Jane Lynch submitted this episode for consideration due to her nomination for the Primetime Emmy Award for Outstanding Supporting Actress in a Comedy Series at the 65th Primetime Emmy Awards.
