= Makeover (Glee) =

- Glee episode
- Episode no.: Season 4 Episode 3
- Directed by: Eric Stoltz
- Written by: Ian Brennan
- Production code: 4ARC03
- Original air date: September 27, 2012

Guest appearances
- Sarah Jessica Parker as Isabelle Wright; Jayma Mays as Emma Pillsbury; Vanessa Lengies as Sugar Motta; Michael Hitchcock as Dalton Rumba; Melissa Benoist as Marley Rose; Dean Geyer as Brody Weston; Jacob Artist as Jake Puckerman; Lauren Potter as Becky Jackson; Phyllis Applegate as Birdie Lawrence; Sean Gunn as Phineas Hayes; Dan Domenech as Chase Madison; Suzanne Krull as a woman describing Isabelle Wright

Episode chronology
← Previous "Britney 2.0"	Next → "The Break Up"
- Glee season 4

"Makeover" is the third episode of the fourth season of the American musical television series Glee, and the sixty-ninth episode overall. Written by Ian Brennan and directed by Eric Stoltz, it aired on Fox in the United States on September 27, 2012. In the episode, Brittany (Heather Morris) and Blaine (Darren Criss) go head-to-head in a debate for student council president, while Kurt (Chris Colfer) lands an internship at Vogue.com and Rachel decides to give herself a makeover. The episode features the introduction of special guest star Sarah Jessica Parker as Isabelle Wright of Vogue.com.

== Plot ==
In Lima, Ohio, Blaine Anderson (Darren Criss) decides to sign up for the student council presidential election; concurrently, Brittany Pierce (Heather Morris) asks Artie Abrams (Kevin McHale) to join her ticket, and after Sam Evans (Chord Overstreet) becomes disappointed Brittany did not pick him, she sets him up with Blaine as a running mate. When the debates roll around Brittany's speech is completely off the mark, leading to Blaine and Sam being elected.

Glee club director Will Schuester (Matthew Morrison) confides with cheerleading coach Sue Sylvester (Jane Lynch) that he feels as if he has run out of ideas for New Directions. Sue believes that Will has lost his passion for school choir after achieving his dream of leading New Directions to victory in Nationals, and advises him to seek for a new project. Will later tells his fiancé, guidance counselor Emma Pillsbury (Jayma Mays), that he is considering joining a blue ribbon government panel to improve on arts education nationwide, and Emma encourages him to follow his dreams.

In New York City, Kurt Hummel (Chris Colfer) is successfully interviewed by Isabelle Wright (Sarah Jessica Parker) for an internship at Vogue.com. Kurt consoles Rachel Berry (Lea Michele), who is being taunted by classmates, proposing a makeover that will both change Rachel's look and give him a chance to impress Isabelle with his idea of turning a makeover montage into a music video for Vogue.com. Isabelle joins in once she hears that they're giving Rachel a makeover. Vogue.com eventually decides to re shoot the video of Rachel's makeover and use it as the launching point of a new marketing strategy, giving Kurt credit for his contribution. He is asked to sit down in the pitch meetings from now on, and Isabelle tells him that while his ambition in the performing arts is great, he has an aptitude for fashion and should consider it as a career possibility going forward.

Artie's electoral ambitions gets him a date with Sugar Motta (Vanessa Lengies), while Kurt is inadvertently pulling away from Blaine. Distraught, Blaine complains to Sam that now Kurt's not at McKinley anymore nothing seems to have a point, and Sam tries to reassure Blaine of his importance to Kurt and the school.

In New York City, after Rachel shares a duet of Sheryl Crow's "A Change Would Do You Good" with NYADA friend Brody Weston (Dean Geyer), she invites Brody to have dinner. Subsequently, while talking in the living room, Rachel and Brody share their first kiss before being interrupted by a knock on the door. Thinking it is Kurt, Rachel is surprised to see instead her former fiancé Finn Hudson (Cory Monteith).

== Production ==
Special guest star Sarah Jessica Parker begins a multi-episode arc as Isabelle Wright of Vogue.com, who will be Kurt's mentor. The name of Parker's character was originally reported to be Isabelle Klempt. Parker was in the recording studio on August 16, 2012, Series co-creator Ryan Murphy ran a photo of her first scene with Colfer on August 20, and she had a dance rehearsal with Colfer and Michele the following day. Murphy has characterized Isabelle as "sweet and vulnerable", and said that "she and Kurt become best friends".

The episode features the return of Cory Monteith as Finn Hudson, who was absent from the first two episodes of the season, after having left to join the army at the end of the third season. Recurring characters in this episode include guidance counselor Emma Pillsbury (Jayma Mays), glee club members Sugar Motta (Vanessa Lengies), Marley Rose (Melissa Benoist) and Jake Puckerman (Jacob Artist), McKinley cheerleader Becky Jackson (Lauren Potter), NYADA junior Brody Weston (Dean Geyer) and deaf-school choir director Dalton Rumba (Michael Hitchcock).

Four songs from the episode were released as singles, including the Tears for Fears song "Everybody Wants to Rule the World" performed by Criss, Hole's "Celebrity Skin" performed by Morris and Chord Overstreet, a mashup of "The Way You Look Tonight" by Jerome Kern with lyrics by Dorothy Fields, and "You're Never Fully Dressed Without a Smile" from the musical Annie, performed by Parker, Colfer, and Lea Michele and Sheryl Crow's "A Change Would Do You Good" performed by Michele and Dean Geyer. "Mr. Monotony" was initially announced as being released as a single, but was not released as it was cut from the episode. It would have been performed by Matthew Morrison and Jane Lynch.

== Reception ==
=== Ratings ===
"Makeover" received a 2.4/7 Nielsen rating/share in the 18–49 demographic and attracted 5.79 million American viewers during its initial broadcast. In Australia, it was broadcast on 7 November 2012 on Network Ten. It received 473,000 viewers and was the 21st most watched program of the night. Its total viewership numbers were down 125,000 from the previous week's episode "Britney 2.0".
