= Britney 2.0 (EP) =

EP by Glee Cast
- Released: September 18, 2012
- Recorded: 2012
- Genre: Pop, dance-pop, soundtrack
- Length: 24:19
- Label: Columbia / 20th Century Fox TV

Glee Cast chronology
Glee: The Music, The Graduation Album (2012)	Britney 2.0 (2012)	Glee: The Music Presents Glease (2012)

Britney 2.0 is an extended play (EP) by the cast of the musical television series Glee. It contains eight songs from the season four Glee episode of the same name, "Britney 2.0", which was the second tribute episode dedicated to American pop singer Britney Spears. The EP is composed of six songs and two mash-ups of Spears songs from her debut album ...Baby One More Time up to her seventh studio album Femme Fatale. The EP was only released digitally.

== Chart performance ==
The EP debuted at number one on the Billboard Top Soundtracks Album chart and at number forty-three on the Billboard 200.

== Track listing ==
No.	Title	Original artist	Length
1.	"3"	Britney Spears	3:27
2.	"Boys" / "Boyfriend"	Britney Spears / Justin Bieber	2:43
3.	"Gimme More"	Britney Spears	3:25
4.	"Hold It Against Me"	Britney Spears	3:38
5.	"Womanizer"	Britney Spears	3:32
6.	"Everytime"	Britney Spears	3:41
7.	"Oops!... I Did It Again"	Britney Spears	2:51
8.	"(You Drive Me) Crazy" / "Crazy"	Britney Spears / Aerosmith	2:22

== Personnel ==
- Rafael Akinyemi – composer
- Tiffany Amber – composer
- Adam Anders – arranger, engineer, producer, soundtrack producer, vocals
- Marcella Araica – composer
- Jacob Artist – vocals
- Melissa Benoist – vocals
- Justin Bieber – composer
- Nikesha Briscoe – composer
- Darren Criss – vocals
- Desmond Child – composer
- Peer Åström – engineer, mixing, producer
- Geoff Bywater – executive in charge of music
- Dante Di Loreto – executive producer
- Jörgen Elofsson – composer
- Brad Falchuk – executive producer
- Lukasz Gottwald – composer
- Nate Hills – composer
- Keri Hilson – composer
- Chad Hugo – composer
- Mathieu Jomphe – composer
- Samuel Larsen – vocals
- David Kreuger – vocals
- Mason Levy – composer
- Per Magnusson – composer
- Max Martin – composer
- Kevin McHale – vocals
- Bonnie McKee – composer
- Lea Michele – vocals
- Heather Morris – vocals
- Ryan Murphy – producer, soundtrack producer
- Matthew Musto – composer
- Alex Newell – vocals
- Chord Overstreet – vocals
- Joe Perry – composer
- Ryan Peterson – engineer
- Mike Posner – composer
- Rami – composer
- Shellback – composer
- Annette Stamatelatos – composer
- Britney Spears – composer
- Steven Tyler – composer
- Jenna Ushkowitz – vocals
- James Washington – composer
- Pharrell Williams – composer
