= Swan Song (Glee) =

- Glee episode
- Episode no.: Season 4 Episode 9
- Directed by: Brad Falchuk
- Written by: Stacy Traub
- Production code: 4ARC09
- Original air date: December 6, 2012

Guest appearances
- Whoopi Goldberg as Carmen Tibideaux; Kate Hudson as Cassandra July; Iqbal Theba as Principal Figgins; Samuel Larsen as Joe Hart; Alex Newell as Wade "Unique" Adams; Melissa Benoist as Marley Rose; Dean Geyer as Brody Weston; Becca Tobin as Kitty Wilde; Jacob Artist as Jake Puckerman; Blake Jenner as Ryder Lynn; Lauren Potter as Becky Jackson; Brad Ellis as Brad

Episode chronology
← Previous "Thanksgiving"	Next → "Glee, Actually"
- Glee season 4

"Swan Song" is the ninth episode of the fourth season of the American musical television series Glee, and the seventy-fifth episode overall. Written by Stacy Traub and directed by co-creator Brad Falchuk, it aired on Fox in the United States on December 6, 2012. The episode features the return of special guest stars Whoopi Goldberg as New York Academy of Dramatic Arts (NYADA) dean Carmen Tibideaux and Kate Hudson as NYADA dance instructor Cassandra July, on the eve of the school's Winter Showcase.

== Plot ==
Immediately after her collapse onstage at Sectionals, the glee club helps Marley Rose (Melissa Benoist) backstage. Unknown to the glee club at the time, leaving the stage in the middle of a performance is grounds for disqualification, and despite Will Schuester's (Matthew Morrison) efforts to get New Directions to return to the stage, Sue Sylvester (Jane Lynch) informs them that the Dalton Academy Warblers have been declared the winners of Sectionals. With New Directions' performance season over, Sue claims the choir room and auditorium for her own use, leaving the glee club without a practice venue, but confides to Becky Jackson (Lauren Potter) that she considers it an empty victory. Interim director Finn Hudson (Cory Monteith) tries to rally the glee club members to prepare for the upcoming holiday concert, but the entire club is dejected and points out to Finn that several members are seniors and do not have a "next year" to make another run at Nationals; Tina Cohen-Chang (Jenna Ushkowitz) and Artie Abrams (Kevin McHale) in particular blame Marley for their loss. As a result of the glee club's performance season ending early, most of the club members take up other extracurricular activities. The loss also spurs Sam Evans (Chord Overstreet) and Brittany Pierce (Heather Morris) to express their feelings for each other.

In New York, Kurt Hummel (Chris Colfer) prepares for his second NYADA audition, and dean Carmen Tibideaux (Whoopi Goldberg) hands Rachel Berry (Lea Michele) a highly coveted invitation to perform at the Winter Showcase. Dance teacher Cassandra July (Kate Hudson) believes that Rachel is not ready to perform at Winter Showcase, and the two have a dance showdown to "All That Jazz" from Chicago. Rachel realizes that she is not as good a dancer as Cassandra, and chooses to focus on singing for her Winter Showcase performance. Kurt visits Carmen's office and inquires about his second audition; she is highly critical of the audition and tells him that he is not suited for NYADA. At the Winter Showcase, Rachel performs "Being Good Isn't Good Enough" and "O Holy Night", receiving standing ovations after both songs. After Rachel's performance, Carmen surprises everyone by saying that the next performance will be Kurt's audition for NYADA. Rachel helps a panicked Kurt calm down and decide on a song to perform; he performs "Being Alive" from Company and also receives a standing ovation. Rachel ends up winning the Winter Showcase, and Kurt gets admitted to NYADA.

Rachel calls Finn, who is dejected after having cleared the glee club's trophies from the choir room and seeing the glee club break up. Finn confides that he feels like a failure after all that has happened. After reflecting on their mutual experiences with the glee club, she tells him to never give up on his dreams. Marley – the only student who remained committed to the glee club – tells Finn that she has found a new rehearsal space: the steps outside the school. Finn asks the other glee club members to meet there. When only Marley shows up at the appointed time, Finn and Marley begin singing "Don't Dream It's Over", but they are slowly joined by the other glee club members.

== Production ==
Special guest stars Whoopi Goldberg and Kate Hudson return as NYADA dean Carmen Tibideaux and NYADA dance instructor Cassandra July respectively. Recurring guest stars include Principal Figgins (Iqbal Theba), glee club members Joe Hart (Samuel Larsen), Wade "Unique" Adams (Alex Newell), Marley Rose (Melissa Benoist), Jake Puckerman (Jacob Artist), Kitty Wilde (Becca Tobin) and Ryder Lynn (Blake Jenner), cheerleader Becky Jackson (Lauren Potter), and NYADA junior Brody Weston (Dean Geyer). In addition, pianist Brad Ellis, who has acted as the glee club's accompanist ever since the pilot, speaks for the very first time - displaying his hatred for the Glee club students.

This episode includes six songs, all of which were released as singles and one of which was released as a track on the deluxe version of the album Glee: The Music, Season 4, Volume 1. The songs include Frank Sinatra and Nancy Sinatra's "Somethin' Stupid" performed by Chord Overstreet and Heather Morris, "All That Jazz" from the musical Chicago performed by Hudson and Michele, Barbra Streisand's cover of "Being Good Isn't Good Enough" from Hallelujah, Baby! performed by Michele, "Being Alive" from Company performed by Colfer, and Crowded House's "Don't Dream It's Over" performed by New Directions. Michele's rendition of the Christmas carol "O Holy Night", which was released in 2010 on Glee: The Music, The Christmas Album, was also performed, but not released as an individual single.

== Reception ==
=== Ratings ===
The episode was watched by 5.43 million American viewers, and garnering a 2.2/6 rating/share among adults 18-49. The show finished third in its timeslot against Grey's Anatomy which placed first, and Person of Interest which placed second. Including DVR viewership, the episode was watched by 2.54 million, bringing the total viewership to 7.98 million viewers.

In Canada, the episode was watched by 1.074 million viewers and placed nineteenth for the week.

=== Music and performances ===
In December 2012, TV Guide named the "Somethin' Stupid" rendition one of Glee's best performances, with the periodical commenting: "this sweet oldie proved the two could dance, crack jokes and make beautiful music together. In a season chock-full of highly choreographed top 40 hits, this simple song was a breath of fresh air."
