= The Role You Were Born to Play =

- Glee episode
- Episode no.: Season 4 Episode 5
- Directed by: Brad Falchuk
- Written by: Michael Hitchcock
- Production code: 4ARC05
- Original air date: November 8, 2012

Guest appearances
- Jayma Mays as Emma Pillsbury; Iqbal Theba as Principal Figgins; Dot-Marie Jones as Shannon Beiste; Vanessa Lengies as Sugar Motta; Adina Porter as the history teacher; Alex Newell as Wade "Unique" Adams; Samuel Larsen as Joe Hart; Melissa Benoist as Marley Rose; Becca Tobin as Kitty Wilde; Blake Jenner as Ryder Lynn; Jacob Artist as Jake Puckerman; Ric Sarabia as Mr. Clippinger

Episode chronology
← Previous "The Break Up"	Next → "Glease"
- Glee season 4

"The Role You Were Born to Play" is the fifth episode of the fourth season of the American musical television series Glee, and the seventy-first episode overall. It was written by Michael Hitchcock and directed by Brad Falchuk, and aired on Fox in the United States on November 8, 2012. The episode features the return of Mercedes (Amber Riley) and Mike (Harry Shum, Jr.), and the introduction of The Glee Project second-season winner Blake Jenner as McKinley student Ryder Lynn. This is the first episode of the show where lead star Lea Michele did not appear as Rachel Berry since her introduction in the show's pilot episode.

== Plot ==
Artie Abrams (Kevin McHale) recruits Finn Hudson (Cory Monteith), who is working at his stepfather's tire shop and feeling like a failure, to co-direct McKinley High's production of Grease with him. Blaine Anderson (Darren Criss) auditions for them, but after singing "Hopelessly Devoted to You", he breaks down and says he can't play Danny, the male lead, since the musical is about love and his relationship with Kurt has been shattered. Finn tells Artie he's not going to direct, because he doesn't know what he's doing, but Artie reveals that he's called in help in the form of graduates Mercedes Jones (Amber Riley) and Mike Chang (Harry Shum, Jr.), who arrive and join them to help run auditions.

In the girls restroom, Marley Rose (Melissa Benoist) and Wade "Unique" Adams (Alex Newell) talk about the musical, and Unique reveals she wants to play the female role of Rizzo. Cheerleading coach Sue Sylvester (Jane Lynch) overhears them and tells Unique that she's a boy, and can't get cast as a female. Marley defends Unique, and later the two audition together, duetting on "Blow Me (One Last Kiss)". When asked what roles they want to play, Marley asks for Sandy, and Unique for Rizzo. Artie is not enthusiastic about the latter casting, but Mercedes praises Unique's voice, and Finn pushes for it.

Without Blaine, there's no good candidate for Danny as Sam Evans (Chord Overstreet) prefers to play Kenickie, Joe (Samuel Larsen) refuses to cut his dreadlocks for the part and Jake Puckerman (Jacob Artist) refuses to audition. Artie reminds Finn that Will Schuester (Matthew Morrison) had difficulties recruiting a male lead for New Directions before he found Finn, which gives Finn the idea to ask Coach Shannon Beiste (Dot-Marie Jones) whether any of the football players might be candidates for the musical. She suggests Ryder Lynn (Blake Jenner), a sophomore who has recently transferred in. Finn approaches Ryder, who is struggling with his grades, and convinces him that glee club might help improve his studying. Although he is initially reluctant, Ryder later meets Finn at the auditorium, where they perform an impromptu duet of "Juke Box Hero", which turns out to be Ryder's audition song.

Ryder later introduces himself to Marley, since she's also auditioned, and Jake, seeing their encounter and egged on by Kitty Wilde (Becca Tobin), decides to audition. To spite Marley, Kitty also auditions, and Jake and her duet on "Everybody Talks", showing off their dance abilities. The directors decide to call back Ryder and Jake for Danny, and Marley and Kitty for Sandy: Mercedes and Mike lead all four of them in singing and dancing "Born to Hand Jive" to test the chemistry between the potential pairings.

Sue objects to Finn's plan to cast Unique as Rizzo, and demands that Will and Principal Figgins (Iqbal Theba) intervene. Finn stands by his decision, but angers Sue when he refers to her daughter as "retarded". Sue becomes livid when she discovers that Unique was cast as Rizzo despite her objections, and more so after Will asks Finn to take over New Directions for him while he is in Washington, D.C., for three months, working on a blue ribbon government panel to improve arts education nationwide. Finn agrees to take over glee club and the cast list for the musical is announced, with Ryder as Danny, Marley as Sandy, Jake as Putzie and Kitty as Patty Simcox, much to her anger.

Will plans to bring his fiancé, Emma Pillsbury (Jayma Mays), with him to Washington, but she's reluctant to go, and the two bring in Coach Beiste to mediate. Emma agrees to accompany Will, but Beiste realizes she doesn't want to, and later urges Emma to be honest. She finally admits to Will that she wants to stay and work at McKinley, and the two agree to visit each other on weekends while he's away, and to marry once Will has returned.

== Production ==
"The Role You Were Born to Play" was directed by co-creator Brad Falchuk and written by supervising producer Michael Hitchcock. Filming was set to begin by August 31, 2012, and was still being shot when the fourth season premiered on Fox on September 13, 2012, the same evening that Falchuk revealed the episode's title in a tweet.

Blake Jenner, the winner of the second season of The Glee Project, whose prize was a role with a seven-episode arc on Glee's fourth season, is introduced in this episode as Ryder Lynn, a football-playing student at McKinley. Co-creator Ryan Murphy had Jenner's hair cut for the role on August 31, 2012, and his first day of filming was two weeks later on September 13, 2012.

Main cast members Amber Riley as Mercedes Jones and Harry Shum, Jr. as Mike Chang make their first fourth-season appearances in this episode. Their first day of filming was September 12, 2012. A recurring character returning for the first time this season is Coach Beiste, played by Dot-Marie Jones. This is also the first episode of the season to focus exclusively on McKinley High and Lima, Ohio: neither Rachel (Lea Michele) nor Kurt (Chris Colfer), who are in New York City, appeared.

Other recurring characters in this episode include guidance counselor Emma Pillsbury (Jayma Mays), glee club members Sugar Motta (Vanessa Lengies), Joe Hart (Samuel Larsen), Wade "Unique" Adams (Newell), Marley Rose (Benoist) and Jake Puckerman (Artist), Principal Figgins (Theba), and cheerleader Kitty Wilde (Tobin).

Three songs from the episode are being released as singles, including Foreigner's "Juke Box Hero", performed by Jenner and Monteith, "Everybody Talks" by Neon Trees performed by Artist and Tobin, and Pink's "Blow Me (One Last Kiss)" performed by Benoist and Newell. The episode also includes two songs from the EP Glee: The Music Presents Glease: "Hopelessly Devoted to You" performed by Criss, and "Born to Hand Jive" performed by Riley, Jenner, Benoist, and Artist.
