= All or Nothing (Glee) =

- Glee episode
- Episode no.: Season 4 Episode 22
- Directed by: Bradley Buecker
- Written by: Ian Brennan
- Production code: 4ARC22
- Original air date: May 9, 2013

Guest appearances
- Jayma Mays as Emma Pillsbury; Jessica Sanchez as Frida Romero; Amy Aquino as the Funny Girl producer; Vanessa Lengies as Sugar Motta; NeNe Leakes as Roz Washington; Meredith Baxter as Liz Stevens; Patty Duke as Jan; Blake Jenner as Ryder Lynn; Melissa Benoist as Marley Rose; Becca Tobin as Kitty Wilde; Jacob Artist as Jake Puckerman; Samuel Larsen as Joe Hart; Alex Newell as Wade "Unique" Adams; Bob Bancroft as Dr. Donald Langdon; Jack Plotnick as Dr. Leonard Haltman

Episode chronology
← Previous "Wonder-ful"	Next → "Love, Love, Love"
- Glee season 4

"All or Nothing" is the twenty-second episode and season finale of the fourth season of the American musical television series Glee, and the eighty-eighth episode overall. Written by Ian Brennan and directed by Bradley Buecker, it aired on Fox in the United States on May 9, 2013. Patty Duke and Meredith Baxter make their only appearances as a lesbian couple, Jan and Liz, who were briefly considered for an ongoing storyline. Jessica Sanchez returns as Frida Romero, a powerhouse singer for a show choir competing against McKinley High's New Directions at Regionals. Meanwhile, Rachel is auditioning for a Broadway role. Brittany develops an unusual attitude and gives out weird demands and Blaine reveals that he plans to propose marriage to Kurt after he meets a lesbian couple who legally marry. Brittany finally reveals she was given an acceptance into MIT and says a tearful goodbye to her friends including Santana and Sam, Ryder refuses to perform at Regionals unless a "Catfish" is revealed and Will and Emma get married in the choir room.

The episode received generally negative reviews, and most critics felt the episode forced due to the multiple plots in it, but enjoyed the musical performances of Sanchez.

Upon its initial airing, this episode was viewed by 5.92 million American viewers and received a 2.0/6 Nielsen rating/share in the 18–49 demographic. The total viewership was up slightly from the previous episode, "Wonder-ful", which had been broadcast one week previously.

== Plot ==
Glee club director Will Schuester (Matthew Morrison) announces that Regionals will be held at McKinley High due to bad weather in the competition's original location, Indianapolis. He also encourages the glee club to send well wishes to Rachel Berry (Lea Michele), who is concurrently performing in her callback audition for the Broadway revival of Funny Girl, performing "To Love You More".

Brittany Pierce (Heather Morris) visits MIT, where she is dubbed a mathematical genius. Returning to Lima, she becomes arrogant, refuses to perform at Regionals (unless she sings every song as a solo), leaves the Cheerios, and breaks up with Sam Evans (Chord Overstreet).

Blaine Anderson (Darren Criss) remains determined to propose to Kurt Hummel (Chris Colfer). While shopping for a ring, he meets Jan (Patty Duke), a lesbian jeweler who has been with her partner Liz (Meredith Baxter) for many years. Blaine and Kurt later have dinner with Jan and Liz, where Jan and Liz explain how their relationship evolved over the years and their experience with the growing mainstream acceptance of homosexuals. Noting the increasing number of states legalizing same-sex marriage, Jan proposes to Liz, which further encourages Blaine.

Much like Brittany, Ryder Lynn (Blake Jenner) also refuses to perform at Regionals unless "Katie/Catfish" reveals themselves. Marley Rose (Melissa Benoist) initially takes the blame, but Wade "Unique" Adams (Alex Newell) later confesses to Ryder that she is actually "Katie/Catfish"; Unique has a crush on Ryder and created a false identity to become closer to him. She had Marley cover for her out of fear of losing Ryder. An angry and hurt Ryder vows to never speak to her again. After Will and former cheerleading coach Sue Sylvester (Jane Lynch) fail to get Brittany to change her attitude, Sam gets Santana Lopez (Naya Rivera) to return to Lima to intervene. Ryder later decides to perform at Regionals for the benefit of the team, but will be leaving the glee club afterward. After talking with Santana, Brittany decides to perform at Regionals. Brittany reveals to the glee club she has been offered early admission to MIT and delivers an emotional goodbye, as she will be leaving after Regionals. She says that the glee club was the one place where she felt accepted and New Directions gets ready to perform.

At Regionals, the Hoosierdaddies, led by Frida Romero (Jessica Sanchez), perform "Clarity" and "Wings". New Directions performs "Hall of Fame" and "I Love It", followed by Marley's original song, "All or Nothing". New Directions wins Regionals and return to the choir room, where guidance counselor Emma Pillsbury (Jayma Mays) shows up with an officiant and announces that she and Will are getting married immediately. After exchanging vows, Will and Emma celebrate with New Directions, while Blaine holds a jewelry box behind his back.

== Production ==
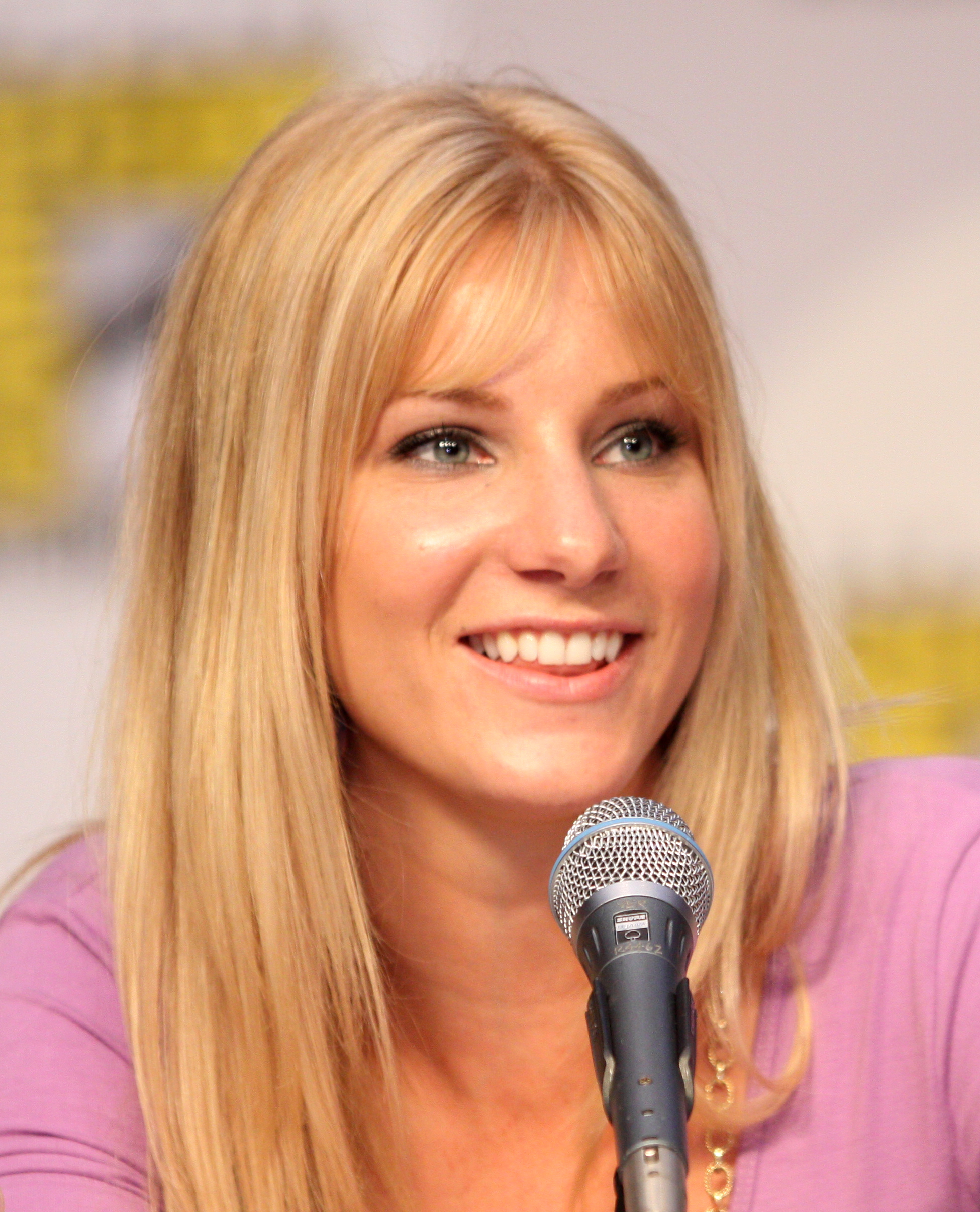
"All Or Nothing" marked Heather Morris's final appearance as series regular

Shooting for the episode began on April 11, 2013, in parallel with the previous episode, which had started shooting earlier in the month. Ryan Murphy has described the finale as leaving "many cliffhangers". Shooting for the episode and the fourth season ended the evening of April 24, 2013.

Cory Monteith, who played Finn Hudson, does not appear in the season finale. Monteith entered a rehab facility on March 31, 2013, causing him to miss the remainder of the season. The storyline planned for him was changed, and the scripts for the final two episodes were revised to include replacement scenes for those that had been plotted to include Monteith.

Two new characters were introduced in this episode who were briefly expected to continue into the show's fifth season. Patty Duke and Meredith Baxter played Jan and Liz, a lesbian couple in a 25-year committed relationship; Duke's character, who works in a jewelry store, meets Blaine who is shopping for a ring for Kurt. Plans were later cancelled to have the elder couple continue mentoring the younger in season five.

Unlike in past seasons, the end of the fourth season does not mean the end of the current school year; classes for it continued into the fifth season. According to Overstreet, "It's one of those finales that's going to be picked right up when season five begins."

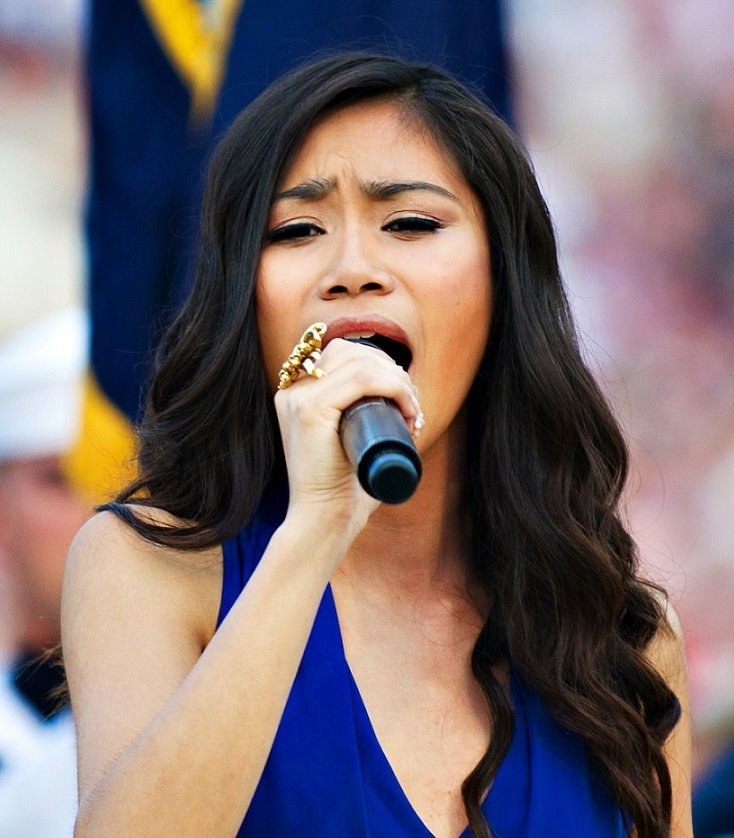
Jessica Sanchez (pictured) guest stars in "All Or Nothing" as Frida Romero.

Special guest star Jessica Sanchez who made a cameo in "Lights Out", officially debuts as Frida Romero, the lead singer of the Hoosierdaddies a rival show choir for the New Directions.

Other recurring characters in this episode include McKinley High's guidance counselor Emma Pillsbury (Mays), McKinley's new cheerleading coach Roz Washington (NeNe Leakes), glee club members Sugar Motta (Vanessa Lengies), Joe Hart (Samuel Larsen), Wade "Unique" Adams (Newell), Marley Rose (Benoist), Jake Puckerman (Jacob Artist), Kitty Wilde (Becca Tobin) and Ryder Lynn (Jenner), and a producer of the Broadway revival of Funny Girl (Amy Aquino).

Six songs from the episode are being released as singles: Celine Dion's "To Love You More" sung by Michele; The Script's "Hall of Fame" performed by Kevin McHale, Chord Overstreet, Artist, Jenner and Larsen; Zedd and Foxes' "Clarity" and Little Mix's "Wings", both performed by Sanchez; Icona Pop's "I Love It" performed by Morris, Jenna Ushkowitz, Newell and Tobin; and an original song with the same title as the episode, "All or Nothing", performed by Benoist and Criss.

== Reception ==
=== Ratings ===
"All Or Nothing" was first broadcast on May 9, 2013 in the United States. It garnered a 2.0/6 Nielsen rating/share and received 5.92 million American during its initial airing. Viewership and ratings were up slightly from those of the previous episode, "Wonder-ful", which was watched by 5.19 million American viewers and acquired a 1.9/5 rating/share in the 18–49 demographic upon first airing.

=== Critical response ===
"All Or Nothing" received generally negative reviews from critics. Jessica Zaleski of Huffington Post wrote that the episode was "forgettable" and she said the episode just didn't measure up to the other finales of the series. Also she criticized the Will and Emma wedding plot and called it "boring and void of emotion" and she was concerned that Rachel's audition plot failed to have an end in the fourth season.

Brandon Nowalk of The A.V. Club graded the episode "C+" he said there's no wonder in the episode and that it feels "like just another episode" and it seems "unfinished". He said: "it's been a rocky, rewarding season limited mostly by its own reticence to move forward".

Rae Votta of Billboard wrote that the episode did not feel like a finale and called it "lackluster". She said that enjoyed the presence of Jessica Sanchez as Frida Romero, but considered it unfortunate that Sanchez did not have any lines or plot points, adding that the vocals of Sanchez are "astounding".

Lauren Hoffman of Vulture wrote that the episode had very strong moments and said that the episode felt "a little forced" due to the many plots in the episode, she also commented that the Brittany plot was more poignant than she would have expected it to be. She enjoyed the performance of "Clarity" by Frida Romero and the Hoosierdadies, and thought that New Directions winning the regionals was "just fine". She said that this season wasn't bad at all and it had some good episodes.

Mary Ann Sleasman of TV.com said that the episode was "predictable" and she said that Brittany's early admission in MIT plot was weak and very excessive, also she criticized the writers for not taking the time to show us how Schue and Emma patched up their broken relationship. She said: "Season 4 did work as a cohesive unit. It wasn't perfect, but a lot of that can be chalked up to the growing pains associated with figuring out how to switch back and forth between Lima and New York, figuring out what to do with the new students, and figuring out how to utilize the McKinley graduates without overshadowing the new faces—all of which, to be honest, still need some improvement. But season 4 was very much a transitional season, and when you look at it as such, the season did what it needed to do".
