= I Do (Glee) =

- Glee episode
- Episode no.: Season 4 Episode 14
- Directed by: Brad Falchuk
- Written by: Ian Brennan
- Production code: 4ARC14
- Original air date: February 14, 2013

Guest appearances
- Jayma Mays as Emma Pillsbury; Dianna Agron as Quinn Fabray; Melissa Benoist as Marley Rose; Jacob Artist as Jake Puckerman; Blake Jenner as Ryder Lynn; Lauren Potter as Becky Jackson; Ali Stroker as Betty Pillsbury; Dean Geyer as Brody Weston

Episode chronology
← Previous "Diva"	Next → "Girls (and Boys) On Film"
- Glee season 4

"I Do" is the fourteenth episode of the fourth season of the American musical television series Glee, and the eightieth episode overall. Written and directed by co-creators Ian Brennan and Brad Falchuk, respectively, it aired on Fox in the United States on February 14, 2013, and features the events surrounding the long-anticipated wedding of Will Schuester and Emma Pillsbury.

== Plot ==
Rachel Berry (Lea Michele), Kurt Hummel (Chris Colfer), Santana Lopez (Naya Rivera), Quinn Fabray (Dianna Agron), Mercedes Jones (Amber Riley), and Mike Chang (Harry Shum Jr.) return to Lima to attend the wedding of Will Schuester (Matthew Morrison) and Emma Pillsbury (Jayma Mays) on Valentine's Day. Emma is extremely anxious about the wedding, and Finn Hudson (Cory Monteith) believes it might be because he kissed her. Meanwhile, Ryder Lynn (Blake Jenner) decides to help Jake Puckerman (Jacob Artist) give his girlfriend Marley Rose (Melissa Benoist) a great Valentine's Day, even though Ryder also has feelings for her. On Ryder's advice, Jake serenades Marley with one of her favorite songs, "You're All I Need to Get By".

At the wedding, Artie Abrams (Kevin McHale) is paired with Emma's niece, Betty Pillsbury (Ali Stroker), who rejects him. Emma finds herself unable to go through with the wedding and performs "Getting Married Today" from Company. Sue Sylvester (Jane Lynch) announces Emma's departure, and Will leaves to search for her, but agrees to proceed with the wedding reception. Kurt and Blaine Anderson (Darren Criss) sing "Just Can't Get Enough" and decide to briefly rekindle their relationship, causing Tina Cohen-Chang (Jenna Ushkowitz) to become jealous and accidentally reveal to Kurt that she's in love with Blaine. Santana and Quinn start to flirt with each other after getting drunk.

Ryder continues to provide Jake with presents for Marley, but is disappointed when Jake voices his belief that he'll have sex with Marley. Sue decides to throw the bouquet, and Rachel catches it. Afterwards, Finn confronts Rachel and announces that, even though she's living with Brody Weston (Dean Geyer), they are meant to be together. They sing "We've Got Tonight", and later Finn and Rachel, Kurt and Blaine, Santana and Quinn, and Artie and Betty have sex, while Marley decides not to go through with it with Jake. Afterwards, Rachel sneaks out and returns to New York City, reuniting with Brody. They both lie about having spent Valentine's Day alone.

The following day, Marley thanks Ryder, revealing that she knows he's been helping Jake, and gives him a Valentine's card. Ryder reveals that he did everything for her and not Jake, and kisses her before she leaves. Betty decides to give Artie another chance and they begin a relationship. Tina apologizes to Blaine for her actions and he promises to help her find a boyfriend. Finn convinces Will not to give up on Emma and they arrange a performance of "Anything Could Happen" in the auditorium, during which Jake notices Marley and Ryder's strange interactions. Meanwhile, in New York, Rachel takes a pregnancy test and appears surprised by the result.

== Production ==
The episode was written by Glee co-creator Ian Brennan and directed by a second co-creator, Brad Falchuk, both of whom are executive producers for the show. Shooting for the episode had begun by January 15, 2013, and overlapped with that for the previous episode, "Diva".

Recurring characters in this episode include school guidance counsellor Emma Pillsbury (Jayma Mays), Yale student Quinn Fabray (Dianna Agron), glee club members Marley Rose (Melissa Benoist), Jake Puckerman (Jacob Artist) and Ryder Lynn (Blake Jenner), cheerleader Becky Jackson (Lauren Potter) and NYADA junior Brody Weston (Dean Geyer). In addition, Ali Stroker, one of the two runners-up from the second season of The Glee Project, is guest starring as Emma's niece, Betty Pillsbury.

Five songs from the episode are being released as singles. These are Marvin Gaye and Tammi Terrell's "You're All I Need to Get By" performed by Artist and Benoist, "Getting Married Today" from Company performed by Morrison, Mays and Amber Riley, Depeche Mode's "Just Can't Get Enough" performed by Chris Colfer and Darren Criss, Bob Seger's "We've Got Tonite" performed by Cory Monteith, Lea Michele, Colfer, Criss, Benoist, Artist, Agron, Naya Rivera, Kevin McHale and Stroker and Ellie Goulding's "Anything Could Happen" performed by Benoist, McHale and Artist.
