= Girls (and Boys) On Film =

- Glee episode
- Episode no.: Season 4 Episode 15
- Directed by: Ian Brennan
- Written by: Michael Hitchcock
- Production code: 4ARC15
- Original air date: March 7, 2013

Guest appearances
- Jayma Mays as Emma Pillsbury; Vanessa Lengies as Sugar Motta; Alex Newell as Wade "Unique" Adams; Samuel Larsen as Joe Hart; Melissa Benoist as Marley Rose; Jacob Artist as Jake Puckerman; Blake Jenner as Ryder Lynn; Becca Tobin as Kitty Wilde; Don Most as Rusty Pillsbury; Valerie Mahaffey as Rose Pillsbury; Oliver Kieran-Jones as Adam Crawford

Episode chronology
← Previous "I Do"	Next → "Feud"
- Glee season 4

"Girls (and Boys) On Film" is the fifteenth episode of the fourth season of the American musical television series Glee, and the eighty-first episode overall. Written by Michael Hitchcock and directed by co-creator Ian Brennan, it aired on Fox in the United States on March 7, 2013, and features the 500th musical number filmed by Glee since its inception.

== Plot ==
Glee club director Will Schuester (Matthew Morrison) dreams of singing "You're All the World to Me" with his ex-fiancée, guidance counselor Emma Pillsbury (Jayma Mays), who left him at the altar, and becomes inspired to assign New Directions to perform songs from their favorite movies. In preparation for Regionals, Will makes it the club's annual mash-up competition, and announces that the winning team will star in a low-budget student film directed by Artie Abrams (Kevin McHale). Blaine Anderson (Darren Criss) and Brittany Pierce (Heather Morris) lead the club in a performance of "Shout" to warm up for the competition.

In New York City, Rachel Berry (Lea Michele), Kurt Hummel (Chris Colfer), Santana Lopez (Naya Rivera) and Adam Crawford (Oliver Kieran Jones) get stuck in Rachel and Kurt's apartment during a snowstorm and decide to watch Moulin Rouge! together, during which Kurt fantasizes about singing "Come What May" with Blaine. Santana later voices her suspicions that Brody Weston (Dean Geyer) is a drug dealer after finding a large amount of money in his possession and due to his constant disappearances, which irritates Rachel.

In Lima, Ohio, the boys perform a mash-up of "Old Time Rock and Roll" and "Danger Zone", followed by the girls' performance of "Diamonds Are a Girl's Best Friend" and "Material Girl". Marley Rose (Melissa Benoist) confides with Kitty Wilde (Becca Tobin) that Ryder Lynn (Blake Jenner) kissed her on Valentine's Day, and Finn tricks Emma's parents into revealing that she's at her sister's house, and convinces Will to fight to get her back.

Will and New Directions serenade Emma with "In Your Eyes", and Emma admits she ran away because she feels that she doesn't know Will anymore. They agree to take their relationship slowly. Meanwhile, Jake Puckerman (Jacob Artist) admits that his Valentine's Day presents to Marley were Ryder's idea, and invites her to do pottery with him, during which he sings to her "Unchained Melody". Marley, however, is divided between him and Ryder, and confesses about Ryder kissing her, causing Jake to storm off.

In NYC, Kurt admits to Adam that he's still in love with Blaine, but wants to move on, and Adam decides to progress with their relationship, while Santana confronts Rachel about the pregnancy test that she found. Rachel breaks down in her arms, and Santana realizes Rachel might be pregnant.

In Lima, Will announces that both groups won the competition and will appear in Artie's movie, and thanks Finn for finding Emma. Finn then admits that he kissed her when she began to have a breakdown over the marriage, and an enraged Will leaves him alone, while the students gather to celebrate their shared victory with a performance of "Footloose".

== Production ==
The episode was written by Glee supervising producer Michael Hitchcock and directed by co-creator Ian Brennan. The 500th musical number filmed for the series thus far was shot for it: "Shout" from the movie Animal House, performed by the show's glee club, New Directions. The song was filmed on January 30, 2013.

Recurring characters in this episode include school guidance counsellor Emma Pillsbury (Jayma Mays), glee club members Sugar Motta (Vanessa Lengies), Joe Hart (Samuel Larsen), Wade "Unique" Adams (Alex Newell), Marley Rose (Melissa Benoist), Jake Puckerman (Jacob Artist), Kitty Wilde (Becca Tobin) and Ryder Lynn (Blake Jenner), NYADA senior Adam Crawford (Oliver Kieran Jones), and Emma's parents Rose and Rusty Pillsbury (Valerie Mahaffey and Don Most).

The ten songs from the episode, all of which are movie-related, are being released as eight singles. These consist of two mash-ups: "Diamonds Are a Girl's Best Friend" from Gentlemen Prefer Blondes and "Material Girl", based on "Sparkling Diamonds" from Moulin Rouge! and performed by Benoist and Newell, and "Old Time Rock and Roll" from Risky Business and "Danger Zone" from Top Gun performed by Chord Overstreet and Darren Criss, and six individual songs including "Come What May" from Moulin Rouge! sung by Criss and Colfer, "Unchained Melody" from Ghost sung by Artist and Jenner, "You're All the World to Me" from Royal Wedding performed by Matthew Morrison and Mays, "Footloose" from the movie of the same name performed by Overstreet, Kevin McHale and Larsen, and "In Your Eyes" from Say Anything... performed by Morrison and Newell. The proceeds from downloads of the remaining song, "Shout", which is performed by Criss and Heather Morris with New Directions, are being donated through the end of the fourth season to the Give a Note Foundation, a music education charity for children.
