= Lights Out (Glee) =

- Glee episode
- Episode no.: Season 4 Episode 20
- Directed by: Paris Barclay
- Written by: Ryan Murphy
- Production code: 4ARC20
- Original air date: April 25, 2013

Guest appearances
- Sarah Jessica Parker as Isabelle Wright; Iqbal Theba as Principal Figgins; NeNe Leakes as Roz Washington; Jessica Sanchez as Frida Romero; Jane Lanier as the dance teacher; Blake Jenner as Ryder Lynn; Melissa Benoist as Marley Rose; Lauren Potter as Becky Jackson; Alex Newell as Wade "Unique" Adams; Becca Tobin as Kitty Wilde; Jacob Artist as Jake Puckerman

Episode chronology
← Previous "Sweet Dreams"	Next → "Wonder-ful"
- Glee season 4

"Lights Out" is the twentieth episode of the fourth season of the American musical television series Glee, and the eighty-sixth episode overall. Written by Ryan Murphy and directed by Paris Barclay, it aired on Fox in the United States on April 25, 2013, and features the third and final special appearance of Sarah Jessica Parker as Isabelle Wright.

== Plot ==
Glee club director Will Schuester (Matthew Morrison) finds out that the lead singer of rival glee club The Hoosierdaddies is Frida Romero (Jessica Sanchez), a young woman with a powerful voice. A power outage at McKinley High School prompts Will to assign the club to perform "unplugged", as he believes the glee club has become too reliant on electronic instruments.

Sam Evans (Chord Overstreet) and Ryder Lynn (Blake Jenner) lead with a performance of "You've Lost That Lovin' Feelin'". Ryder continues his effort to meet "Katie" and admits to Jake Puckerman (Jacob Artist) that he told her his greatest secret. Jake encourages Ryder to share it with the club. After a rendition of "Everybody Hurts", Ryder admits that he was sexually molested by a female babysitter when he was 11 years old. Sam and Artie Abrams (Kevin McHale) believe Ryder's experience to be a boy's dream come true, but Kitty Wilde (Becca Tobin) later states that she transferred to McKinley after being molested by her best friend's older brother and that she understands his pain.

Artie leads New Directions in a performance of "We Will Rock You", using everyday objects to create music. Blaine Anderson (Darren Criss) later locates Sue Sylvester (Jane Lynch), who has become an aerobics instructor since she was dismissed for firing a gun at the school. He tries to convince her to return to McKinley, as he believes her replacement as coach of the Cheerios, Roz Washington (Nene Leakes), is not fit for the job. Sue refuses but later visits the school, where Becky Jackson (Lauren Potter) also tries to convince her to return. Sue once again refuses, claiming she has grown tired of the Cheerios through a performance of "Little Girls". Becky, who had actually been the one who accidentally fired the gun, later goes to talk to Principal Figgins (Iqbal Theba).

In New York City, Isabelle Wright (Sarah Jessica Parker) recruits her intern Kurt Hummel (Chris Colfer) to help her organize a benefit party sponsored by Vogue.com. Kurt convinces his roommates Santana Lopez (Naya Rivera) and Rachel Berry (Lea Michele) to help with the benefit, and during the party, Rachel, Kurt, Santana and Isabelle perform "At the Ballet". Santana reconnects with her youthful dream of becoming a dancer and signs up for extension classes at the New York Academy of Dramatic Arts (NYADA), the school Rachel and Kurt attend full-time.

The power comes back at McKinley, but Will convinces the students to continue with their assignment and perform an a cappella number. Ryder talks with Katie about how he will find out who she is and how their interactions have helped him overcome his traumas. Kitty tries to become closer to him but is hurt by his continuing interest in Katie. Ryder and Kitty continue to struggle with their feelings during New Directions' performance of "The Longest Time" in the auditorium.

== Production ==
Shooting for the episode began in March and continued at least through April 3, 2013. Special guest star Sarah Jessica Parker returns as Kurt's boss at Vogue.com, Isabelle Wright. According to show co-creator Ryan Murphy, the musical number that Parker appears in—"At the Ballet", along with Michele, Colfer and Rivera—was Parker's idea.

Jane Lynch appears as former cheerleading coach Sue Sylvester in this episode, and performs "Little Girls" from the musical Annie. Lynch made her Broadway debut in Annie in May 2013, playing Miss Hannigan, the role that sings that song.

A number of scenes for the episode shown in previews and advance publicity were not included in the broadcast version. Although Cory Monteith had shot scenes as Finn Hudson prior to entering rehab at the end of March 2013, at least one of which was shown in the "Episodic photos" section of the FoxFlash website, and the press release for the episode stated that "Will and Finn enlist the members of New Directions to 'unplug'", Finn does not appear in the episode as broadcast. Similarly, scenes of Blaine in costume and of Blaine and Sam interrogating Becky were also not shown.

Jessica Sanchez, the runner-up on American Idol in its eleventh season, makes her acting debut in this episode as Frida Romero, a powerhouse singer in the Hoosierdaddies glee club that is a rival to New Directions in the upcoming Regionals show choir competition. Sanchez will also be appearing in the final two episodes of Glee this season.

Other recurring characters in this episode include Principal Figgins (Theba), new cheerleading coach Roz Washington (Leakes), glee club members Wade "Unique" Adams (Alex Newell), Marley Rose (Melissa Benoist), Jake Puckerman (Artist), Kitty Wilde (Tobin) and Ryder Lynn (Jenner), and cheerleader Becky Jackson (Potter).

Six songs from the episode are being released as singles, including the previously mentioned Broadway numbers "At the Ballet" and "Little Girls", plus The Righteous Brothers' "You've Lost That Lovin' Feelin'" sung by Overstreet and Jenner, Queen's "We Will Rock You", R.E.M.'s "Everybody Hurts" sung by Jenner, and Billy Joel's "The Longest Time" performed by McHale, Overstreet, Jenner, Benoist, Artist and Tobin.

== Reception ==
=== Ratings ===
In its original American broadcast, "Lights Out" was watched by 5.24 million, down by 0.90 from the previous episode.

=== Critical reception ===
Miranda Wicker, from TV Fanatic praised the music performed in the episode during the power outage, "But the stretch of my imagination was worth it because that power outage gave us some incredible music" and also commented on the success of the music so far in the season - "It was all fantastic. If nothing else, Glee is really winning with the music this season."

The episode however did receive slightly negative reviews. Freddy Millian from Trendy Spoon claimed the episode was too "dark for its own good" and that the show is only favourable when it implements "a happy, escapist fantasy" and not when it "..[makes] us cringe at poorly-handled personal trauma."
