= Wonder-ful =

- Glee episode
- Episode no.: Season 4 Episode 21
- Directed by: Wendey Stanzler
- Written by: Brad Falchuk
- Production code: 4ARC21
- Original air date: May 2, 2013

Guest appearances
- Katey Sagal as Nancy Abrams; Kate Hudson as Cassandra July; Mike O'Malley as Burt Hummel; Romy Rosemont as Carole Hudson-Hummel; Melissa Benoist as Marley Rose; Blake Jenner as Ryder Lynn; Becca Tobin as Kitty Wilde; Jacob Artist as Jake Puckerman; Phillip Rhys as Martin; Alex Newell as Wade "Unique" Adams; Don Franklin as Burt's doctor; Patrick Stafford as the sycophant #1; J.D. Phillips as the sycophant #2

Episode chronology
← Previous "Lights Out"	Next → "All or Nothing"
- Glee season 4

"Wonder-ful" is the twenty-first episode of the fourth season of the American musical television series Glee, and the eighty-seventh episode overall. It aired on Fox in the United States on May 2, 2013, and features the introduction of special guest star Katey Sagal as Nancy Abrams and the final appearance of special guest star Kate Hudson as Cassandra July.

The episode is a tribute to the music of Stevie Wonder.

== Plot ==
Rachel Berry (Lea Michele) calls glee club director Will Schuester (Matthew Morrison) to let him know she is one of the finalists for the role of Fanny Brice in the upcoming Broadway revival of Funny Girl; he tells the club the good news and encourages them to perform Stevie Wonder songs to celebrate the wonderful things in their lives.

Kitty Wilde (Becca Tobin) finds out that Artie Abrams (Kevin McHale) has been accepted in a film school in New York City but scared of how his mother will react to him living in New York by himself if he doesn't tell her. She performs "Signed, Sealed, Delivered I'm Yours" to encourage him to go, but Artie remains decided about staying. Kitty then approaches Nancy Abrams (Katey Sagal), who is surprised to learn about Artie's feelings about leaving. After being confronted by his mother, Artie admits he is afraid to be on his own, but Nancy assures him he'll adapt, and now emboldened, Artie decides to go to New York.

Mercedes Jones (Amber Riley), who is recording her first album, returns to Lima with Mike Chang (Harry Shum, Jr.) and Kurt Hummel (Chris Colfer) to help coach New Directions for Regionals. She helps Marley Rose (Melissa Benoist) improve her voice, and the two sing "Superstition" alongside Blaine Anderson (Darren Criss) in the auditorium.

Kurt learns his father Burt Hummel's (Mike O'Malley) cancer is in remission, and celebrates his recovery with a performance of "You Are the Sunshine of My Life". Blaine later asks Burt's permission to propose to Kurt, but Burt tells him they're not ready for that type of commitment, and they'll be together eventually. Meanwhile, Mercedes and Mike notice Jake Puckerman's (Jacob Artist) talents, and motivate him be a more active voice in the glee club, which Jake accomplishes through a rendition of "I Wish".

In New York, Cassandra July (Kate Hudson) finds out about Rachel's callback and initially seems to continue on her harassment of her, setting up an extremely difficult dance exam for the next day and telling her she'll go to her audition to see her fail. However, the exam turns out to be a party where Cassandra and the students congratulate Rachel on the callback by performing "Uptight (Everything's Alright)". Cassandra tells Rachel that she's proud of her, and that all her bullying and apparent hate of her was meant to push her into becoming a better artist. Rachel thanks Cassandra for her lessons.

Mercedes becomes disappointed when the record label tries to force her to change her image to have the album released, and decides to cancel their contract and pursue her dreams through different means. She reminds New Directions to always remain true to themselves by singing "Higher Ground". The club later meets at the auditorium, where they celebrate Artie's success with a rendition of "For Once in My Life".

== Production ==
Shooting for the episode had begun by April 8, 2013, and was done in parallel with the final episode, which started by April 10.

Cory Monteith, who plays Finn Hudson, does not appear in this episode or the season finale that follows it. Monteith entered a rehabilitation program facility on March 31, 2013, causing him to miss the remainder of the season. The storyline planned for him was changed, and the scripts for the final two episodes were revised accordingly. Romy Rosemont, who plays Finn's mother Carole on the show, makes her first appearance of the fourth season.

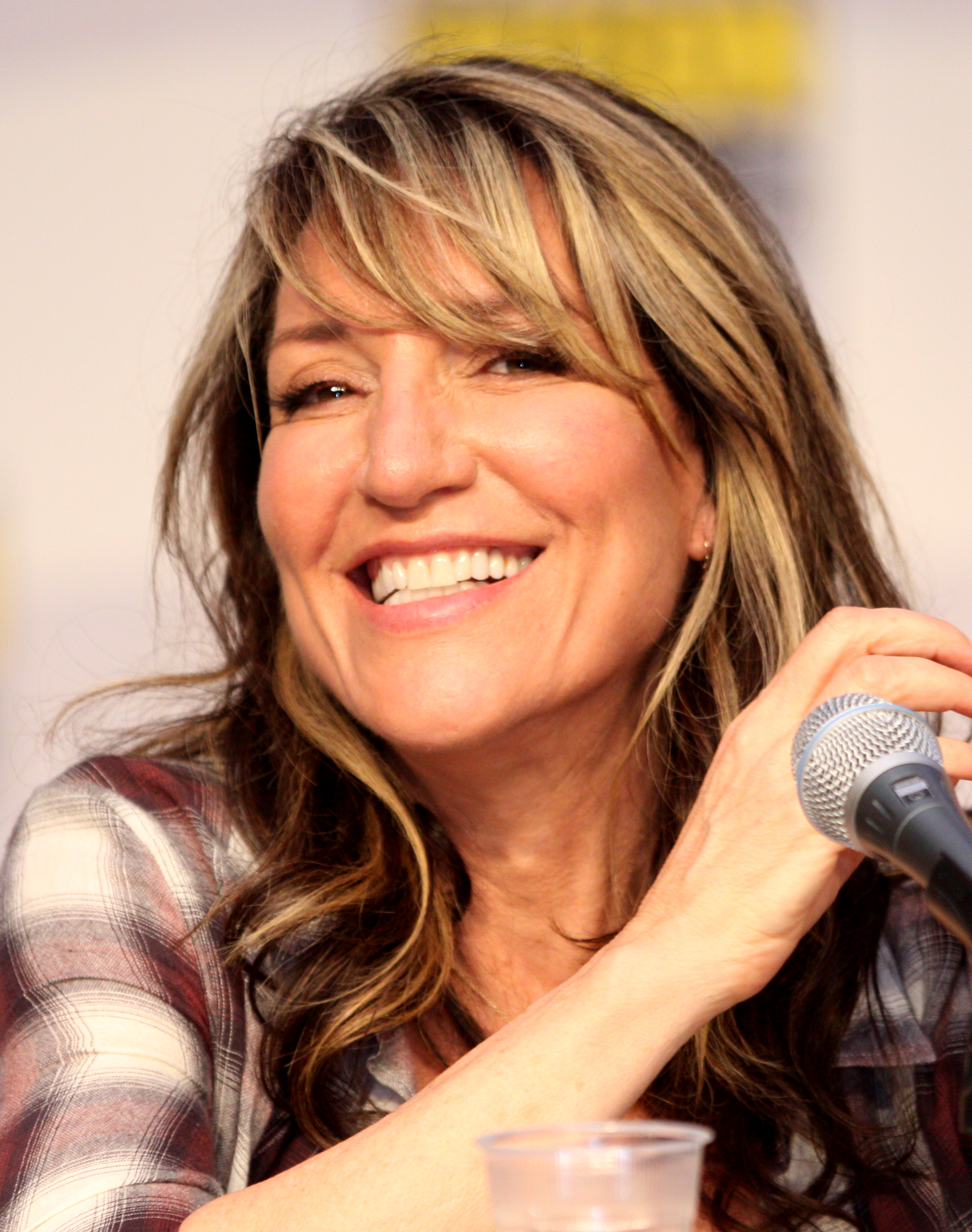
Katey Sagal appears as Artie's mother, Nancy Abrams

Special guest star Katey Sagal debuts as Nancy Abrams, Artie's mother. Kevin McHale, who plays Artie, had proposed Sagal—along with Harry Connick, Jr.—as the character's yet-to-be-seen parents at the Glee panel held during the 2012 Comic-Con shortly before the fourth season began shooting. Show co-creator Ryan Murphy announced Sagal's casting on April 5, 2013. Sagal filmed her scenes on April 10.

Special guest star Kate Hudson returns as Cassandra July, Rachel's dance instructor at NYADA. Other recurring characters in this episode include Kurt's father Burt Hummel (O'Malley), Burt's wife and Finn's mother Carole Hudson-Hummel (Rosemont), glee club members Wade "Unique" Adams (Alex Newell), Marley Rose (Benoist), Jake Puckerman (Artist), Kitty Wilde (Tobin) and Ryder Lynn (Blake Jenner), and two unnamed sycophantic students at NYADA (Patrick Stafford and J.D. Phillips).

Seven Stevie Wonder songs from the episode are being released as singles: "For Once in My Life" sung by McHale, "You Are the Sunshine of My Life" performed by Chris Colfer, "Signed, Sealed, Delivered I'm Yours" sung by Tobin, "I Wish" performed by Artist, "Higher Ground" sung by Amber Riley, "Uptight (Everything's Alright)" performed by Hudson and "Superstition" sung by Riley, Darren Criss and Benoist.

== Ratings ==
"Wonder-ful" was first broadcast on May 2, 2013 in the United States. It garnered a 1.9/5 Nielsen rating/share and received 5.19 million American during its initial airing. Viewership was down slightly from those of the previous episode, but the ratings was slightly up from those of the previous episode "Lights Out", which was watched by 5.24 million American viewers and acquired a 1.8/5 rating/share in the 18–49 demographic upon first airing.
