= Britney 2.0 =

- Glee episode
- Episode no.: Season 4 Episode 2
- Directed by: Alfonso Gomez-Rejon
- Written by: Brad Falchuk
- Production code: 4ARC02
- Original air date: September 20, 2012

Guest appearances
- Kate Hudson as Cassandra July; Jayma Mays as Emma Pillsbury; Iqbal Theba as Principal Figgins; Alex Newell as Wade "Unique" Adams; Samuel Larsen as Joe Hart; Melissa Benoist as Marley Rose; Dean Geyer as Brody Weston; Jacob Artist as Jake Puckerman; Becca Tobin as Kitty Wilde; Josh Sussman as Jacob Ben Israel; Trisha Rae Stahl as Millie Rose

Episode chronology
← Previous "The New Rachel"	Next → "Makeover"
- Glee season 4

"Britney 2.0" is the second episode of the fourth season of the American musical television series Glee, and the sixty-eighth episode overall. Written by Brad Falchuk and directed by Alfonso Gomez-Rejon, it aired on Fox in the United States on September 20, 2012, and features Glee's second episode dedicated to the music of Britney Spears. This episode features the New Directions attempting to cheer up a depressed Brittany Pierce (Heather Morris) with Britney Spears songs. Special guest star Kate Hudson returns as Rachel's dance instructor, Cassandra July.

The episode was watched by 7.46 million viewers, making it the most watched episode of the fourth season.

== Plot ==
In New York City, Rachel Berry (Lea Michele) and Kurt Hummel (Chris Colfer) rent a small apartment and move in together. At the New York Academy of Dramatic Arts (NYADA), Rachel continues to be pressured by her dance instructor, Cassandra July (Kate Hudson), who refuses to teach Rachel tango because she thinks she lacks sex appeal. Kurt plays Rachel a video of Cassandra which reveals that ten years earlier, she used to be a promising star on Broadway but wrecked her first performance so dramatically due to pressure that no one wanted to hire her again.

Meanwhile, in Lima, Ohio, Brittany Pierce (Heather Morris) once again finds her true identity as she performs Britney Spears's "Hold It Against Me" during cheerleading practice before being interrupted by coach Sue Sylvester (Jane Lynch), who kicks her off the Cheerios due to her bad grades and replaces her with Kitty Wilde (Becca Tobin). This, in addition to the busy schedule of her girlfriend, Santana Lopez (Naya Rivera), who is attending University of Louisville, causes Brittany to become depressed. Hoping to cheer her up, guidance counselor Emma Pillsbury (Jayma Mays) convinces glee club director Will Schuester (Matthew Morrison) to have New Directions perform Britney Spears' songs. Subsequently, Artie Abrams (Kevin McHale) and Blaine Anderson (Darren Criss) perform a mash-up of "Boys" and Justin Bieber's "Boyfriend", for Brittany, and she is once more inspired by Spears.

New member Marley Rose (Melissa Benoist) confides to Wade "Unique" Adams (Alex Newell) that she is interested in troublemaker Jake Puckerman (Jacob Artist), leading to a performance of "Womanizer", during which Jake invites Marley to "hang out". At the bleachers, Marley meets up with Jake and they perform a mash-up of "(You Drive Me) Crazy" and Aerosmith's "Crazy", as they share a romantic moment. Jake later hears two students mocking Marley and her mother (Trisha Rae Stahl) and confronts them, leading to a fight. Will interrupts the altercation and sends Jake to the choir room, where he's surprised to find his half-brother Noah "Puck" Puckerman (Mark Salling), who now lives in Los Angeles. Puck introduces himself to Jake and convinces him to join New Directions, so that the experience can help Jake just as it helped him.

In New York City, Rachel enlists the help of her friend, NYADA upperclassman Brody Weston (Dean Geyer), to prove to Cassandra that she can be sexy by performing a sultry rendition of "Oops!... I Did It Again"; however, the number fails to impress Cassandra. Rachel accuses her of picking on her students because they may have a future in show business, while Cassandra wrecked her future by becoming a "YouTube joke." Infuriated, Cassandra kicks Rachel out of her class. Brody later comforts Rachel and tries to kiss her, but she refuses, as she is still in love with Finn Hudson (Cory Monteith). Brody agrees to respect Rachel's relationship, but admits he has feelings for her. Rachel apologizes to Cassandra and Cassandra allows her to come back to class. Cassandra then explains that show business is a world with harsh realities and that although she did not realize that ten years earlier, she knows it now and she wants Rachel to know that as well and that is why she's hard on Rachel and the other students.

In Lima, Tina Cohen-Chang (Jenna Ushkowitz) performs an acoustic version of "3" with Sam Evans (Chord Overstreet) and Joe Hart (Samuel Larsen). Brittany attempts to shave her head and is stopped by Will, after which she walks into the hallway, only to be provoked by Jacob Ben Israel (Josh Sussman), who she beats up with an umbrella in front of the student body. To cheer Brittany up, New Directions members suggest she should lead the school assembly. Brittany objects that her voice is not up to par, and suggests they lip sync, an idea they rebuke at first, but she manages to convince them. New Directions performs "Gimme More" at the school assembly, but the performance is a disaster due to Brittany's lack of motivation, leading the student body to discover that Brittany was lip-synching to the song. They are booed off of the stage and reprimanded by Will in the choir room. Brittany resigns from the club and marches out of the room.

Sam later invites Brittany to meet him at the auditorium, where she admits she staged her breakdown in order to have a more effective comeback, and tells him that she misses Santana. Sam tells Brittany that he will be her friend. Brittany later asks Sue to reinstate her on the Cheerios, and shows some marginal improvements on her grades. Sue agrees on the condition that Brittany's grades continue to improve so she can graduate.

The following day, Jake tells Marley he is going to join New Directions, and she learns that he is now dating Kitty. Jake joins New Directions, and an upset Marley performs "Everytime" in the choir room. As this plays, Brittany pines alone in her bedroom for Santana who is offline on iChat, and Rachel paints over a drawing of Finn's name that she had made on her apartment's wall.

== Production ==
The episode is the second to feature the music of Britney Spears; the first was the second season's second episode, "Britney/Brittany", which remains one of the show's highest-rated episodes. It was initially reported on May 15, 2012, that this episode would feature eight of her songs; the report also noted that Spears was one of the new judges on the show that would be preceding Glee in its new Thursday night slot, The X Factor.

In a July 2012 interview with E! News, Colfer said he hoped to perform a song from Spears' 2011 album, Femme Fatale, since he did not get to sing one of her songs during the show's first Spears tribute episode. Overstreet revealed that on July 22, 2012, he was recording for this episode. Overstreet spoke to the same publication, "It's probably one of her most recent singles. We're doing a really cool version of it. It's going to be a little group number. It's going to be fun."

Eight songs featured in the episode have been released to iTunes as an extended play album entitled Britney 2.0, though not also as individual singles. Details on most of these have been reported: Morris sings "Hold It Against Me" and "Gimme More" by Spears, Michele performs "Oops!... I Did It Again" as a big production number, McHale and Criss perform a mashup of "Boys" and Justin Bieber's "Boyfriend", a stripped-down acoustic version of Spears' "3" is performed by Ushkowitz, Overstreet and Larsen, "Everytime" is sung by Benoist, and a second mashup features "(You Drive Me) Crazy", called "U Drive Me Crazy", and Aerosmith's "Crazy", sung by Benoist and Artist. The eighth song is "Womanizer", performed by Newell, Benoist and Ushkowitz.

Returning recurring characters in this episode include special guest star Kate Hudson as NYADA dance instructor Cassandra July, McKinley's guidance counselor and Will's fiancée Emma Pillsbury (Mays), glee club members Joe Hart (Larsen), Wade "Unique" Adams (Newell) and Marley Rose (Benoist), new McKinley student Jake Puckerman (Artist), Principal Figgins (Iqbal Theba), cheerleader Kitty (Tobin), NYADA upperclassman Brody Weston (Geyer), McKinley gossip blogger Jacob Ben Israel (Sussman), and Marley's mother (Stahl).

== Reception ==
=== Ratings ===
"Britney 2.0" received a 2.9/8 Nielsen rating/share in the 18–49 demographic and attracted 7.46 million American viewers during its initial broadcast. In Australia, the episode was broadcast October 31, 2012 on Network Ten and received 598,000 viewers, making it the 18th most watched program of the night. This number was up by 46,000 viewers in comparison to the previous episode "The New Rachel" which had an audience of 552,000. The episode was the most watched episode of the fourth season of Glee.

=== Music and performances ===
In December 2012, TV Guide named the mash-up "(You Drive Me) Crazy" / "Crazy" one of Glee's best performances, with the periodical commenting: "Fortunately, the producers weren't afraid to infuse the hour with some classic Aerosmith, which made a memorable combination years after it seemed the best mash-ups were behind Glee" and calling the arrangement "beautiful".
