= Beauty School Dropout =

Song from the musical Grease

Song by Frankie Avalon

from the album Grease (musical) Grease (1978 soundtrack)
- Released: 1971; 1978
- Genre: Rock and roll
- Songwriters: Jim Jacobs, Warren Casey

"Beauty School Dropout" is a song from the musical Grease. It was written by Jim Jacobs and Warren Casey, and was performed by Frankie Avalon for the film version and soundtrack album.

== Overview ==
In the musical, the song is the showcase piece of the Teen Angel, a phantom teen idol who makes his only appearance in the musical to sing the song. The Teen Angel is Frenchy's guardian angel, and script notes specifically identify him as a Fabian look-alike, dressed in all-white. The Teen Angel appears to Frenchy, who, having recently dropped out of beauty school out of frustration with her teachers, asks for a guardian angel in the mold of those seen in Debbie Reynolds movies. The Angel descends from the heavens, then pointedly sings to her that she lacks work ethic and suggests that she return to high school so that she might eventually qualify for a career as a stenographer later in life. Frenchy silently refuses and walks away, leading the Angel to close his number by lamenting her refusal to listen and ascending back to the heavens. (The lyrics are adjusted in the film version to leave Frenchy's decision unstated; she does return for the sock hop and the last day of school—along with others in her class who failed to graduate—and eventually briefly appears as a student in Grease 2 two years later.)

Alan Paul, later a member of The Manhattan Transfer, originated the role on Broadway. It is not uncommon for the role of the Teen Angel to be held as a dual role by one of the other characters in the cast during stage adaptations (in Paul's case, he also appeared as bandleader Johnny Casino). As originally conceived, the angel was more akin to Elvis Presley; after Presley died and Fabian, Donny Osmond and Frankie Valli all turned the role down (Fabian because he was overseas at the time of filming, Valli because he chose to sing the theme song instead, and Osmond because his sister Marie had also declined the role of Sandy), producer Allan Carr turned to Frankie Avalon—who, like Fabian, was a client of Bob Marcucci's during his heyday and whom director Randal Kleiser recalled from filming Fireball 500 with Avalon—to fill the role for the 1978 film adaptation of Grease. Avalon, who had seen the musical and enjoyed it, did not view himself as a fit for the role and initially declined as well but relented when the role was redesigned to match the "Golden Boy" image of Avalon and Fabian.

The Wild Angels recorded an earlier version for Decca Records in 1972.

== Other versions ==
In the Noddy episode "The Tooth Fairy", a parody of the song entitled "Tooth Fairy" is performed by Johnny Crawfish, Whiny, Whimper and the Ruby Reds, with the lyrics altered to be about Johnny's first childhood encounter with the Tooth Fairy.

In 2012, the song was featured in an episode of the TV musical series Glee and in the related extended play soundtrack in a version sung by Darren Criss.

In 2016, Randy Rainbow parodied the song for six candidates for the 2016 Republican Presidential nomination.

From 1972 through 1976, The New Dimensions, a group from the Chicago area, performed a '50s show featuring "Teen Angel" and the music of that era. Teen Angel, played by Pat Hysell, was a ghost of the '50s who reminisced of his days at the malt shop with Betty Sue and their dates at the drive-in theater. The band, led by Gordon Prigge included Hysell, Dick Gerlach and Jim Lyons performed throughout the Midwest for more than 25 years.

Sandy and Richard Riccardi parodied the song as "Tiki Torch Nazis", in reference to the neo-Nazi rally held in Charlottesville, Virginia, in 2017.

== See also ==
Beauty School Dropout (band)
