= Being Alive =

Song by Stephen Sondheim, from the musical Company

"Being Alive" is a song from the musical Company with music and lyrics by Stephen Sondheim. The song appears at the end of act two and is sung by Robert, a 35-year-old bachelor at the center of the show, who "... realizes being a lone wolf isn't all it's cracked up to be ... he declares that he wants to take the chance, be afraid, get his heart broken—or whatever happens when you decide to love and be loved".

== Context ==
Situated at the end of musical's second act, the song expresses the central character's concerns while facing his 35th birthday. Prior to singing "Being Alive", Robert reflects on the relationships of five couples, his "good and crazy married friends"—Susan and Peter, Sarah and Harry, Amy and Paul, Jenny and David, Joanne and Larry—along with three girlfriends: April, Kathy, and Marta. While each relationship has its problems, Robert concludes that it's better to live with someone rather than remain alone.

== Background ==
"Being Alive" was introduced after three previous closing numbers for the second act had been tried. The first of these was "Multitudes of Amys", but as Sondheim describes, writer George Furth "transferred the situation in which it was to be sung – Robert's proposal to Amy – to Act One and the song had to be replaced". The second was "Marry Me A Little"; Sondheim later said that he realized halfway through the writing process of that song that it would not work for the character, and finished it only as "a favor for a friend who loved it". The third was "Happily Ever After", which made it to the Boston tryout before it was "deemed too dark to serve as a closing number". Hence Sondheim wrote "Being Alive", in which he tried to express the same thoughts as "Happily Ever After" with a touch more optimism.

Sondheim was initially reluctant to write a second-act closing song with a positive tone, and made efforts to combine cynical and hopeful sentiments. He wrote in his 2009 memoir Finishing the Hat that he worried a plainly optimistic approach would be "unearned and pandering, not to mention monotonous, since there would be only one thing to say: namely, marriage is wonderful". His concerns were resolved when "Michael Bennett came up with the idea of using the same technique of interlaced spoken voices from Robert's friends that we used in 'Side by Side by Side', helping him break through his moment of crisis. That suggested to me a song which could progress from complaint to prayer. Thus, 'Being Alive'."

In June 2026, CBS News included the song in its list of the 250 essential American songs of the past 250 years.

== Performances ==
"Being Alive" was first recorded by Dean Jones, who originated the role of Robert on Broadway in 1970. After Jones's short tenure playing the role, his replacement Larry Kert also recorded the song, which has since been included as a bonus track on reissues of the original cast album.

The song was performed by Alex (Judd Hirsch) on the US sitcom Taxi, during the 1980 episode "Alex Jumps Out of a Plane".

"Being Alive" has become popular outside its original musical setting, and while written for a male part, the song is frequently performed by women: Bernadette Peters, Patti LuPone, Barbra Streisand, Dusty Springfield, Margaret Whiting, Lea Salonga, Ute Lemper, and Lauren Samuels, among others.

Raul Esparza was a nominee at the 2007 Tony Awards for his role in Company and performed the song on the awards telecast. On the fourth season of the television series Glee, the character Kurt Hummel (Chris Colfer) performed the song in the episode "Swan Song", as his audition for the fictional school NYADA. Neil Patrick Harris also performed it as Bobby in the 2011 revival of Company.

The American composer Gabriel Kahane wrote the piano scherzo "Being Alive" for the 2015 album Liaisons: Re-Imagining Sondheim from the Piano.

In the British soap opera EastEnders, the song is played during the wedding of Linda Carter (Kellie Bright) and Mick Carter (Danny Dyer) on New Year's Day 2016, performed by West End star Alice Fearn. The song also appears on her album "Where I've Been... Where I'm Going".

In the 2019 film Marriage Story, written and directed by Noah Baumbach, lead character Charlie Barber (portrayed by Adam Driver) performs much of the song in a New York piano bar.

The 2023 season finale of 9-1-1: Lone Star featured Tommy singing the song at the wedding of TK and Carlos.
