= Guilty Pleasures (Glee) =

- Glee episode
- Episode no.: Season 4 Episode 17
- Directed by: Eric Stoltz
- Written by: Russel Friend; Garrett Lerner
- Production code: 4ARC17
- Original air date: March 21, 2013

Guest appearances
- Dean Cameron as Kurt's acting teacher; Jacob Artist as Jake Puckerman; Melissa Benoist as Marley Rose; Becca Tobin as Kitty Wilde; Alex Newell as Wade "Unique" Adams; Dean Geyer as Brody Weston; Blake Jenner as Ryder Lynn

Episode chronology
← Previous "Feud"	Next → "Shooting Star"
- Glee season 4

"Guilty Pleasures" is the seventeenth episode of the fourth season of the American musical television series Glee, and the eighty-third episode overall. Written by Russel Friend and Garrett Lerner and directed by Eric Stoltz, it aired on Fox in the United States on March 21, 2013. Kelley Mitchell, Jennifer Greenberg, Melissa Buell, Tym Shutchai Buacharern, Paula Jane Hamilton and Darla Albright were nominated at the 65th Primetime Emmy Awards for Outstanding Makeup for a Single-Camera Series for this episode.

== Plot ==
Blaine Anderson (Darren Criss) and Sam Evans (Chord Overstreet) take over the glee club while Will Schuester (Matthew Morrison) is out sick, and have New Directions perform their musical guilty pleasures in order to strengthen the bond between its members. Blaine and Sam perform "Wake Me Up Before You Go-Go" as a demonstration, and Sam later performs "Copacabana", followed by Blaine, who performs "Against All Odds". Sam notices that Blaine directs the song at him, and Blaine admits he had a crush on him. Sam reveals that he's known for a while and respects Blaine's feelings as they reaffirm their friendship.

Marley Rose (Melissa Benoist), Kitty Wilde (Becca Tobin), Brittany Pierce (Heather Morris), Tina Cohen-Chang (Jenna Ushkowitz) and Wade "Unique" Adams (Alex Newell) perform "Wannabe", and Artie Abrams (Kevin McHale) notes how Kitty became closer to New Directions. The girls later confront Jake Puckerman (Jacob Artist) over performing a Chris Brown song, and although he claims that they should differentiate an artist's personal life from their work, he agrees to change the song and performs "My Prerogative".

In New York, Santana Lopez (Naya Rivera) returns to the loft, and Brody Weston (Dean Geyer) moves out after his fight with Finn Hudson (Cory Monteith). Santana reveals to Rachel Berry (Lea Michele) that Brody was a gigolo, and Rachel later confronts him at NYADA, where they decide that their relationship has definitely come to an end. Rachel thanks Santana for not giving up on trying to make her see the truth. Santana and Kurt Hummel (Chris Colfer) later comfort Rachel, and they sing "Mamma Mia" together, simultaneously with New Directions, who perform it to celebrate the success of the assignment.

== Production ==
The episode was written by Glee executive producers Russel Friend and Garrett Lerner and directed by Eric Stoltz. Shooting continued as late as February 25, 2013.

Recurring characters in this episode include glee club members Wade "Unique" Adams (Alex Newell), Marley Rose (Melissa Benoist), Jake Puckerman (Jacob Artist), Kitty Wilde (Becca Tobin) and Ryder Lynn (Blake Jenner), and NYADA junior Brody Weston (Dean Geyer).

Seven songs from the episode are being released as singles: Barry Manilow's "Copacabana" performed by Overstreet, Radiohead's "Creep" performed by Michele and Geyer, Bobby Brown's "My Prerogative" performed by Artist, Phil Collins's "Against All Odds (Take a Look at Me Now)" sung by Criss, Wham!'s "Wake Me Up Before You Go-Go" performed by Criss and Overstreet, Spice Girls' "Wannabe" performed by Newell, Benoist, Tobin, Ushkowitz and Morris, and ABBA's "Mamma Mia" performed by Michele, Rivera, Colfer and New Directions.

== Reception ==
=== Ratings ===
The episode was watched by 5.91 million American viewers and garnering a 2.0/6 rating/share among adults 18-49. The show placed second in its timeslot, behind Grey's Anatomy. This episode tied in 18-49 ratings from the previous episode "Feud," but this episode saw an increase in viewers.

Via DVR, the episode was watched by 2.42 million viewers with a 1.5 rating, bringing the total to 8.33 million viewers and a 3.1 rating.

=== Critical reception ===
The episode received mainly positive reviews from critics. Lesley Goldberg of The Hollywood Reporter gave the episode a positive review, complimenting the Radiohead cover, calling it "solid," and also saying the episode "set the stage for the final five episodes of the season." Jennifer Broadwater of The Baltimore Sun also complimented the Radiohead cover, calling it "probably my favorite song of the show."

Tierney Bricker of E! Online called the breakup of Rachel and Brody one of Thursday's "Best TV Moments."

MaryAnn Sleasman of TV.com gave the episode a positive review, saying it "was a solid episode to leave us with while the show goes off on a mini-hiatus. We got some Fondue for Two and a few solid performances and some drama that actually kind of made sense except for Rachel swooning over Finn punching Brody in the face." She also called the theme of the week "a strong one and by keeping it in sight at all times, Glee remained on the straight and narrow of decent storytelling. That, and guilty pleasures are just inherently fun. Occasionally mortifying. But fun."

One of few negative reviews of the episode came from Daniel Sperling of Vulture, saying "We've had silly Glee before. For instance, the superhero episode earlier this season was goofy and tongue-in-cheek enough for us to get into. But for whatever reason, it's all too much this time." He also gave a mixed review to the Chris Brown subplot, saying "The debate among the characters is a mature one with reasonable arguments being made all round. But on the other hand, it doesn't feel right for Glee to use a very delicate and troubling situation involving a real-life domestic violence case for shock value. Note how Jake's plan to cover Brown is discovered right before an ad break and jars severely with the rest of the light and fluffy episode." He also called Rachel and Brody's breakup "the most substantial development of the episode, and we can't help but mourn the lack of other good story stuff." Rae Votta of Billboard said "This episode tastes great, but did we learn anything we needed to learn to get to a satisfying thematic end for the season? Not really, at least in Lima. At least in New York Rachel finally feels ready to shake off the weirdness of being a fish out of water and clinging to both the old and the shiny new and in turn focus on her own singular triumphs. For the growing kids in Ohio this was an adult-less episode, and left to run amuck in Ohio even with the best of intentions, the group didn't do much pat each other on the back and eliminate 99 percent of any lingering drama."
