= Dan Domenech =

American actor

Dan Domenech is an American actor best known for his portrayal of Jason Dean in Heathers: The Musical, Drew in the Broadway theatre musical Rock of Ages (musical) and a recurring guest appearance on Glee (TV series). Domenech has also appeared in the pre-Broadway runs of Wonderland (musical) and Sister Act (musical). National/International tours include Rent (musical) and Rock of Ages (musical). He also played Che in Evita in Pennsylvania Shakespeare Festival 2017.

== Early life ==
Domenech grew up in Farmingdale, New York, and went to Vocational school for computer graphics and web design. An active member of the Long Island theater community, he performed in multiple shows at The Cultural Arts Playhouse.

== Acting career ==
Domenech began his acting career as part of the cast of the musical Rent, and toured with the show from 2002 to 2006. He then acted in the pre Broadway run of Sister Act (musical) in 2006 and 2007 and the regional premier of Altar Boyz in 2007. For the next two years he served as an associate choreographer for television and film including Step Brothers (film),Semi-Pro, Fame (2009 film) and the music video for Chasing Pavements which earned a 2008 MTV Video Music Award nomination for Best Choreography. He also was the understudy for JD in the Off-Broadway performance of Heathers The Musical.

Domenech performed in the pre-Broadway run of Wonderland in 2009. He was part of the first national tour of Rock of Ages in 2010 and played Drew in the Broadway production for the next two years. In 2012 Domenech appeared as Chase Madison on Season 4 of Glee on Fox and performed in the Disney Theatrical Productions workshop of Aladdin

In 2013 Domenech played the title role in a stage adaptation of Tarzan The Stage Musical at Meralco Theater.

Domenech understudied the role of Jason Dean, Kurt Kelly and Ram Sweeney in the off-Broadway production of Heathers.

== Filmography ==
=== Television ===
Year	Title	Role	Notes
2012	Glee	Chase Madison	2 episodes
2015	Gotham	Guitar player	Beasts of Prey

=== Theatre ===
Year	Title	Role	Production
2002-2004	Rent	Paul	National Tour
2011-2012	Rock of Ages	Drew	Helen Hayes Theatre
2013	Tarzan	Tarzan	Meralco Theater
2014	Heathers	Jason Dean	New World Stages
2015	Kinky Boots	Ensemble	Royal Alexandra theatre
2017	Evita	Che	Pennsylvania Shakespeare Festival 2017
2018	Smokey Joe's Cafe	Standby	Stage 42

== Personal life ==
When not on tour, Domenech lives in New York. He's been involved with several non-profit organizations including Love146, Lollipop Theater Network which bring movies currently in theaters to children confined to hospitals due to chronic or life-threatening illnesses and award-winning non for profit Broadway Sings for Pride.
