= Diva (Glee) =

- Glee episode
- Episode no.: Season 4 Episode 13
- Directed by: Paris Barclay
- Written by: Brad Falchuk
- Production code: 4ARC13
- Original air date: February 7, 2013

Guest appearances
- Jayma Mays as Emma Pillsbury; Alex Newell as Wade "Unique" Adams; Dean Geyer as Brody Weston; Melissa Benoist as Marley Rose; Jacob Artist as Jake Puckerman; Becca Tobin as Kitty Wilde; Blake Jenner as Ryder Lynn; Oliver Kieran-Jones as Adam Crawford; Patrick Stafford as the sycophant #1; J.D. Phillips as the sycophant #2

Episode chronology
| ← Previous "Naked" | Next → "I Do" |
- Glee season 4

"Diva" is the thirteenth episode of the fourth season of the American musical television series Glee, and the seventy-ninth episode overall. Written by co-creator Brad Falchuk and directed by Paris Barclay, it aired on Fox in the United States on February 7, 2013. Paris Barclay was nominated at the 65th Primetime Emmy Awards for a Primetime Emmy Award for Outstanding Directing for a Comedy Series for this episode.

== Plot ==
Glee club director Finn Hudson (Cory Monteith) is convinced by guidance counselor Emma Pillsbury (Jayma Mays) to create a "diva-off" assignment to prepare New Directions for Regionals. Blaine Anderson (Darren Criss), Kitty Wilde (Becca Tobin), Tina Cohen-Chang (Jenna Ushkowitz), Brittany Pierce (Heather Morris), Wade "Unique" Adams (Alex Newell) and Marley Rose (Melissa Benoist), then perform "Diva" in preparation for the assignment. Meanwhile, in New York City, Kurt Hummel (Chris Colfer) is becoming increasingly irritated by Rachel Berry's (Lea Michele) arrogance after winning the Winter Showcase and challenges her to a "diva-off". They both perform "Bring Him Home", and Kurt is declared the winner, which shakes Rachel's confidence in herself until Kurt reassures her of her talent and encourages her to audition for an upcoming production of Funny Girl.

In Lima, following Blaine's performance of "Don't Stop Me Now", Finn reveals that Santana Lopez (Naya Rivera) has agreed to perform for New Directions with her fellow cheerleaders from the University of Louisville and Santana leads a rendition of "Nutbush City Limits". She reveals that she has discovered about Brittany's relationship with Sam Evans (Chord Overstreet) through Tina, and attempts to undermine their relationship. They duel with "Make No Mistake (She's Mine)", while Brittany secretly watches.

Meanwhile, Tina struggles with her romantic feelings for Blaine, and, after failing to declare herself to him, she expresses her feelings through a performance of "Hung Up", which convinces Finn and Emma to declare her winner of the diva-off, and Blaine to apologize for taking her for granted by asking her to be his date to Will Schuester and Emma's upcoming wedding. Throughout this, Finn, still reeling from having discovered that Rachel has moved in with her boyfriend Brody Weston (Dean Geyer), helps Emma prepare for the wedding, and, when she has a breakdown over a series of trivial matters, Finn attempts to calm her down by kissing her, but quickly realizes it was a mistake and leaves a shocked Emma behind.

Cheerleading coach Sue Sylvester (Jane Lynch) reveals that she knows Santana has dropped out of college and offers her a job as interim coach for the Cheerios, but, after a talk with Brittany, encouraging her to follow her dreams, Santana sings "Girl on Fire" to empower herself before relocating to NYC and moving in with Rachel and Kurt, much to their surprise.

== Production ==
The episode was written by Glee co-creator Brad Falchuk and directed by Paris Barclay. The episode was being shot as late as January 15, 2013, overlapping with the following episode, which was being directed by Falchuk.

Recurring characters in this episode include school guidance counsellor Emma Pillsbury (Jayma Mays), glee club members Wade "Unique" Adams (Alex Newell), Marley Rose (Melissa Benoist), Jake Puckerman (Jacob Artist), Kitty Wilde (Becca Tobin) and Ryder Lynn (Blake Jenner), and NYADA junior Brody Weston (Dean Geyer) and senior Adam Crawford (Oliver Kieran Jones).

Seven songs from the episode are being released as singles. These include "Bring Him Home" from Les Misérables performed by Colfer and Michele, which is being released in two solo versions, one by Michele and one by Colfer, Beyoncé's "Diva" performed by Newell, Morris, Jenna Ushkowitz, and Darren Criss the Barbra Streisand and Kim Carnes duet "Make No Mistake (She's Mine)" performed by Rivera and Overstreet, Alicia Keys' "Girl on Fire" and Ike & Tina Turner's "Nutbush City Limits", both sung by Rivera, Queen's "Don't Stop Me Now" performed by Criss, and Madonna's "Hung Up" performed by Ushkowitz.

== Reception ==
=== Ratings ===
The episode, including DVR numbers, was watched by 8.71 million American viewers.

=== Critical response ===
Erin Strecker of Entertainment Weekly gave a mixed review to the episode, especially with the end scene with Finn and Emma, saying "Did anyone see that coming? We'll have to wait until next week for the fall out, because as soon as he kissed her, he freaked out and immediately left her office. I'm no psychic, but I don't think this is going to have fans cheering quite as much as Nick and Jess' big kiss on New Girl." He then talked positively about the performance of "Bring Him Home" and "Diva", calling the first song of the two "'Defying Gravity Part 2' for our NYADA kids." The second song was "a ton of fun. Loved the idea of turning an auditorium into a runway, did not love Blaine's feathered top. Unique taking lead vocals on this was a great choice."

L'Oreal Thompson of The Baltimore Sun commented on Tina's role in the episode, saying "I really do feel bad for her. It's no fun feeling unappreciated and being on the spurned side of unrequited love." Thompson then gave a mixed review to Santana's end song, saying "I know it's a good message and all, but I just feel like it should be in the Gabby Douglas Lifetime movie or something."

Paris Barclay was nominated at the 65th Primetime Emmy Awards for a Primetime Emmy Award for Outstanding Directing for a Comedy Series for this episode.
