= Glee: The Music, The Christmas Album Volume 3 =

Soundtrack album by the cast of the American television series Glee

Glee: The Music, The Christmas Album, Volume 3

Soundtrack album by Glee Cast
- Released: December 11, 2012
- Recorded: 2012
- Genre: Pop
- Label: Columbia / 20th Century Fox TV

Glee Cast chronology
Glee: The Music, Season 4, Volume 1 (2012)	Glee: The Music, The Christmas Album, Volume 3 (2012)	Glee Sings the Beatles (2013)

Glee: The Music, The Christmas Album, Volume 3 is the fourteenth soundtrack album by the cast of the American musical television series Glee. It features six songs from the fourth season and four bonus songs. It was released on December 11, 2012.

== Commercial performance ==
The album debuted at number 20 on the US Billboard 200, and in its second week, the album fell to number 54, selling 25,000 copies.

== Track listing ==
No.	Title	Original artist	Length
1.	"Jingle Bell Rock"	Bobby Helms	2:32
2.	"White Christmas"	The Drifters	3:36
3.	"Have Yourself a Merry Little Christmas"	Judy Garland	3:35
4.	"Silent Night"	Traditional	4:07
5.	"Joy to the World"	Traditional	3:49
6.	"The First Noel"	Traditional	2:24
7.	"I'll Be Home for Christmas"	Bing Crosby	3:16
8.	"Feliz Navidad"	José Feliciano	2:50
9.	"Hanukkah, Oh Hanukkah"	Traditional	2:08
10.	"Happy Xmas (War Is Over)"	John Lennon and Yoko Ono	3:39
Total length:			31:56

== Charts ==
Chart performance for Glee: The Music, The Christmas Album Volume 3
Chart (2012)	Peak position
Australian Albums (ARIA)	68
US Billboard 200	20
US Soundtrack Albums (Billboard)	2
