= Glee: The Music Presents Glease =

EP by Glee Cast
- Released: November 6, 2012
- Recorded: 2012
- Genres: Pop, soundtrack
- Length: 24:45
- Label: Columbia / 20th Century Fox TV
- Producers: Dante Di Loreto (exec.), Brad Falchuk (exec.), Adam Anders, Peer Åström, Ryan Murphy

Glee Cast chronology
Britney 2.0 (2012)	Glee: The Music Presents Glease (2012)	Glee: The Music, Season 4, Volume 1 (2012)

Glee: The Music Presents Glease is the fifth extended play (EP) by the cast of the musical series Glee. It was released on November 6, 2012, and contains covers of nine songs from the 1971 musical, Grease, and from the film based on it.

== Track listing ==
No.	Title	Length
1.	"Hopelessly Devoted to You" (Featuring Darren Criss)	3:01
2.	"Born to Hand Jive" (Featuring Amber Riley, Melissa Benoist, Blake Jenner and Jacob Artist)	2:43
3.	"Greased Lightnin'" (Featuring Blake Jenner and Chord Overstreet)	3:13
4.	"Look at Me I'm Sandra Dee" (Featuring Becca Tobin)	1:38
5.	"Beauty School Drop Out" (Featuring Darren Criss)	3:59
6.	"Look at Me I'm Sandra Dee (Reprise)" (Featuring Melissa Benoist)	1:27
7.	"There Are Worse Things I Could Do" (featuring Naya Rivera, Kate Hudson and Alex Newell)	2:21
8.	"You're the One That I Want" (Featuring Lea Michele, Cory Monteith, Chris Colfer, Darren Criss, Heather Morris, Naya Rivera, Blake Jenner and Melissa Benoist)	2:47
9.	"Summer Nights" (Featuring Chord Overstreet, Amber Riley, Vanessa Lengies, Damian McGinty, Mark Salling, Jenna Ushkowitz, Naya Rivera, Chris Colfer and Cory Monteith)	3:36
Total length:		24:45
