= Lauren Potter =

American actress

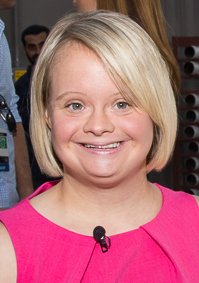
- Lauren Potter celebrating the opening ceremony of the LA 2015 Special Olympics at the Coliseum.
- Born: Lauren Elizabeth Potter; May 10, 1990 (age 36); Inland Empire, California, U.S.
- Occupations: Actress, Comedian
- Years active: 2007–present

Lauren Elizabeth Potter (born May 10, 1990) is an American actress, advocate, and comedian known for her role as Becky Jackson on the FOX series Glee. Potter advocates for those with disabilities through organizations including AbilityPath, Best Buddies International, the National Down Syndrome Society the American Association of People with Disabilities, and Special Olympics.

== Early life ==
Potter was born May 10, 1990, and grew up in Southern California's Inland Empire. At birth, she was diagnosed with Down syndrome. She did not have the ability to walk until the age of two, but then began attending dancing and acting classes at a young age. She graduated from Riverside Polytechnic High School in Riverside, California, and was studying at Irvine Valley College in Irvine, California, as of late 2011.

== Career ==
At the age of 16, Potter obtained her first acting role, starring in the film, Mr. Blue Sky.

From 2009 to 2015, Potter portrayed the recurring character Becky Jackson, a cheerleader with Down syndrome, in all six seasons of the TV show Glee. Cheerleading coach Sue Sylvester (Jane Lynch) takes a special interest in Becky in part because Sue's older sister, Jean, also has Down syndrome. In 2012, Potter was nominated for a SAG award in the Ensemble in a Comedy Series category for her work in Glee. She also received the SAG/AFTRA Harold Russell Award at the 2012 Media Access Awards.

In November 2011, President Barack Obama appointed Potter to the President's Committee for People with Intellectual Disabilities, where she would advise the White House on issues related to that demographic. Twenty-one members are involved in the committee along with 13 U.S. federal government staff. During periodic meetings throughout the year, the committee would discuss a variety of different issues affecting those with disabilities including items such as education and workplace integration issues.

In 2015, Potter appeared as Jenny in the short film Guest Room, which premiered at SXSW. Potter played a young woman with Down syndrome, who dealt with the difficulties of an unplanned pregnancy.

Potter was an ambassador for the 2015 Special Olympics World Games in Los Angeles. She acted as a speaker and role-model to promote inclusion and disability awareness.

Bullied as a young child, Potter has partnered with AbilityPath to put an end to bullying. Additionally, she works with Special Olympics to help promote the Spread the Word to End the Word campaign. Her efforts include starring in a 2011 PSA commercial with co-star Jane Lynch. The commercial, "Not Acceptable", advocates to end the use of the R-word in everyday language.

As of 2016, Potter continues to give speeches across the United States to stand up for these causes.

== Filmography ==
Film
Year	Title	Role	Notes
2007	Mr. Blue Sky	Young Andra Little	
2015	Guest Room	Amber	Also executive producer
2015	Guest Room	Amber	Short film
2017	Headshot	Kate	Short film
2021	Those Who Wish Me Dead	Waitress #2	Credited as Charissa Lauren Potter

Television
Year	Title	Role	Notes
2007	Law & Order: Special Victims Unit	Poisoned Child	
2009–2015	Glee	Rebecca "Becky" Jackson	Recurring role
2012	Leader of the Pack	Jenny	Episode: "Pilot"
2016	Veep	Polly	Episode: "Congressional Ball"
2017	Switched at Birth	Nina	Episode: "Long Live Love"
2017	Born This Way	Herself	
2018	Drunk History	Ventilator Woman	Episode: "Civil Rights"
2019	Chicago Med	Barbara Duncan	Episode: "The Thing We Do"

== See also ==
- List of people with Down syndrome
