= Samuel Larsen =

American actor and singer (born 1991)

- Born: Samuel Peter Acosta Larsen; August 28, 1991 (age 34)
- Occupations: Actor; singer; model; musician
- Years active: 2010–present
- Label: Roc Nation

Samuel Peter Acosta Larsen (born August 28, 1991) is an American actor and singer. On August 21, 2011, Larsen won the reality competition program The Glee Project on the Oxygen network, which led to his having a recurring role as Joe Hart on the Fox television show Glee. Larsen was also a member of the band Bridges I Burn.

He is pursuing his solo career, and released his debut EP, Vices, on October 27, 2014.

== Life and career ==
Larsen is the son of Henrik and Lupe Acosta Larsen. His father is from Denmark and his mother from Mexico. Larsen has an older brother, Manolo Acosta, and a sister named Morgan. As a young boy, Larsen played drums, bass, guitar and keyboards. He graduated from Murrieta Valley High School in 2009. In his sophomore year, he became vocalist and guitarist of the school band 15 North and the band performed in festivals.

In 2010, Larsen auditioned in season 9 of American Idol but was cut after making it to Hollywood, failing to make it to the semi-finals. After doing some runway modeling for fashion designer Ashton Michael, he met his soon-to-be bandmate Skip Arnold during a runway show, moved to Los Angeles busking and applied to The Glee Project. Meanwhile, Larsen and Skip Arnold formed the band "Bridges I Burn" and soon a third member, Salvatore Spinelli, joined them. Larsen writes and performs most of his music. He spent some time touring with the rock band Palaye Royale in 2017–2018. He auditioned for the role of Sam Evans on Glee but did not get the part, which went to Chord Overstreet.

His first Glee appearance was on the thirteenth episode of the third season, titled "Heart", as Joe Hart, a formerly home-schooled Christian. During that episode he performed in two songs: Gym Class Heroes' "Stereo Hearts", and a mashup of The Association's "Cherish" and Madonna's "Cherish". Although his prize for having won The Glee Project was seven episodes, he appeared in each of the final ten episodes of Glee's third season. In addition, he appeared as a mentor for The Glee Project's second season, appeared in 12 episodes in Glee's fourth season, and appeared twice in the final season. In July 2018, Larsen was cast as Zed Evans in the film adaptation of Anna Todd's bestselling novel After. The film was released on 12 April 2019. Larsen plays the role again in its 2020 sequel After We Collided.

== Discography ==
- Pocket Love (2012)
- 3 Blind Costumes (2013)
- Vices - EP (2014)
- Education - Single (2016)
- You Should Know (2016)
- Blue - Single (2017)

== Filmography ==
=== Television ===
Year	Title	Role	Notes
2010	American Idol	Contestant	Season 9, eliminated during Hollywood Week
2011–2012	The Glee Project	Contestant	Contestant (season 1, winner); Guest judge (season 2, episode 2: "Dance-ability")
2012–2013, 2015	Glee	Joe Hart	Recurring (seasons 3–4, 6) (23 episodes)
2015	Hawaii Five-0	Alfie Tucker	Guest; Season 6, episode 9: "Hana Keaka" "Charade"

=== Film ===
Year	Title	Role
2015	The Breakup Girl	Uri
2016	The Remains	Tommy
2016	Recovery	Logan
2017	Disconnected	Dirk
2019	After	Zed Evans
2020	After We Collided	Zed Evans
2023	Beautiful Disaster	Jesse Viveros
2023	Shoulder Dance	Shawn
2024	The Sintern	Gage
