= Shooting Star (Glee) =

- Glee episode
- Episode no.: Season 4 Episode 18
- Directed by: Bradley Buecker
- Written by: Matthew Hodgson
- Production code: 4ARC18
- Original air date: April 11, 2013

Guest appearances
- Dot-Marie Jones as Shannon Beiste; Iqbal Theba as Principal Figgins; Blake Jenner as Ryder Lynn; Melissa Benoist as Marley Rose; Jacob Artist as Jake Puckerman; Becca Tobin as Kitty Wilde; Lauren Potter as Becky Jackson; Alex Newell as Wade "Unique" Adams; Ginny Gardner as Katie Fitzgerald / Marissa; Trisha Rae Stahl as Millie Rose

Episode chronology
← Previous "Guilty Pleasures"	Next → "Sweet Dreams"
- Glee season 4

"Shooting Star" is the eighteenth episode of the fourth season of the American musical television series Glee, and the eighty-fourth episode overall. Written by Matthew Hodgson and directed by Bradley Buecker, it aired on Fox in the United States on April 11, 2013.

== Summary ==
An ordinary day at McKinley is disrupted by a traumatic event that has lasting effects on the school community.

== Plot ==
Glee club director Will Schuester (played by Matthew Morrison) creates a week assignment of "Last Chances" after Brittany Pierce (Heather Morris) announces her beliefs that an asteroid will destroy the city, although she soon finds out that it was actually a ladybug that was on her telescope. Brittany later tells Becky Jackson (Lauren Potter) that she'll be graduating soon, and Becky becomes scared of what will happen once Brittany is gone, but Brittany tells her she will be fine if she prepares herself. Meanwhile, football coach Shannon Beiste (Dot-Marie Jones) reveals her feelings for Will, but he reveals that he has gotten back together with Emma Pillsbury (Jayma Mays), leaving Beiste heartbroken.

Ryder Lynn (Blake Jenner) spots Katie Fitzgerald (Ginny Gardner), the girl he has been texting and that he has developed feelings for, and leads her to the choir room, where he serenades her with "Your Song", only to learn that her name is Marissa, and that she has never texted Ryder: someone else has been using Marissa's picture to pose online as "Katie". Ryder decides to find out who "Katie" is, having shared all of his secrets and fears with her, and arranges a meeting with her over text in front of the choir room the following day. Meanwhile, Sam Evans (Chord Overstreet) announces his love for Brittany and serenades her with "More Than Words" in the auditorium, but she struggles with her own feelings, and instead dedicates the song to her cat, Lord Tubbington, whom she feels is being neglected by her relationship with Sam.

As the glee club gathers in the choir room, two gunshots are heard, and the school goes into lockdown, with Brittany trapped in the bathroom and Tina stranded outside because she was late. Will and Beiste try to keep the students calm, but Sam wants to go after Brittany. Kitty breaks down and admits that she altered Marley's Sandy costumes and apologizes to her, and the two embrace. Ryder calls Katie's phone, and it rings inside the choir room; Artie Abrams (Kevin McHale) encourages the glee club members to record their goodbyes to their families in case they die. Meanwhile, Will leaves the students in Beiste's care and goes to bring Brittany and two other students into the choir room. However, after several hours in lockdown, the police clear the area and the students are allowed to leave.

After the police fail to find the gun, cheerleading coach Sue Sylvester (Jane Lynch) announces that it belonged to her, and misfired, in order to cover up for Becky, who had stolen her father's gun and brought it to school as she was afraid of being out of school after graduating. Principal Figgins (Iqbal Theba) is forced to fire Sue, but Will remains convinced of her innocence. Will also creates an online dating profile for Beiste, and is surprised when one of her suitors turns out to be former football coach Ken Tanaka (Patrick Gallagher), while Sam presents Brittany with another cat, Lady Tubbington, and she finally declares her love for him as well.

Ryder goes to the choir room the following day, but "Katie" never shows up. He then returns to the auditorium and joins his friends in a performance of "Say", during which they comfort each other after the traumatic experience.

== Production ==
The episode was directed by co-executive producer Bradley Buecker and written by Matthew Hodgson. It is centered on McKinley High in Lima, Ohio, and the New York cast does not appear. Show co-creator Ryan Murphy described it as "the most powerful emotional Glee ever".

Prior to the episode, a warning was shown: "This episode of Glee addresses the topic of school violence. Viewer discretion is advised." This marks the first time that a parental advisory warning was used in the show.

The episode features the feline character Lord Tubbington, Brittany's cat. A video about the episode released by the show to YouTube discussed the difficulties of working with animals.

Recurring characters in this episode include McKinley High football coach Shannon Beiste (Dot-Marie Jones), Principal Figgins (Iqbal Theba) and glee club members Wade "Unique" Adams (Alex Newell), Marley Rose (Melissa Benoist), Jake Puckerman (Jacob Artist), Kitty Wilde (Becca Tobin) and Ryder Lynn (Blake Jenner), cheerleader Becky Jackson (Lauren Potter), Marley's mother and McKinley lunch lady Millie Rose (Trisha Rae Stahl) and Ryder's online love interest "Katie Fitzgerald", who has used the likeness of a McKinley student named Marissa (Ginny Gardner). When Ryder calls "Katie" he finds that a glee club member is the mysterious "Katie".

The three songs from the episode are all being released as singles: Extreme's "More Than Words" sung by Overstreet and Morris with New Directions, Elton John's "Your Song" performed by Jenner, and John Mayer's "Say" performed by New Directions.

== Reception ==
=== Ratings ===
The episode had 6.67 million American viewers, up from 5.91 million when its previous episode, "Guilty Pleasures", aired three weeks previously. It garnered 2.4/6 rating/share among adults 18-49, a 20 percent ratings increase from the last episode's 2.0/6 rating/share.

Via DVR, the episode was watched by 2.43 million viewers with an 18-49 rating of 1.0, bringing the total to 9.09 million viewers and a 3.4 rating.

=== Public reception ===
The episode, airing four months after the Sandy Hook Elementary School shooting in Newtown, Connecticut, was too much for the parents of that town, as noted by Los Angeles Times contributor Patrick Kevin Day. Andrew Paley, whose children survived the shooting at Sandy Hook, appeared on CNN on April 12, 2013 to complain that no one from Glee or its network, Fox, reached out to warn the people of Newtown about the content of the episode. Paley and other parents of Newtown had no problem with the network airing such an episode, but noted: "What's really upsetting is that no one, none of the producers, reached out to the town of Newtown to let us residents, who are so close to this, know that this episode was airing and that if anybody is a fan of Glee... it would have been a shocker to them if they didn't know what the episode was about." However, residents of Newtown did receive a warning via a Newtown victims' advocacy group, the Newtown Action Alliance, which got wind of the episode's content early and sent out a warning email.

=== Critical response ===
Critical reception of the episode was mixed. Early reviews from pre-broadcast screenings were mostly positive. Jenna Mullins of E! Online declared it "an emotional roller coaster" and "one of the most unsettling episodes of Glee ever". Mullins singled out the performances by Chord Overstreet, Matthew Morrison, and Jane Lynch as "most likely make you feel like you've been punched straight in the heart". While he conceded that the series "has never been a show that shied away from hot-button topics", TVLine correspondent Michael Slezak noted that episode's central plot "runs headlong into one of the most polarizing debates facing the [United States] today." Slezak asserted that the "harrowing" episode has effective, powerful sequences that "stick with [the viewer] after the credits stop rolling", and lauded the writing for preventing "Shooting Star" from "turning into Law & Order: Lima, while still retaining its teeth". However, some reviews from after the episode's debut were negative. Carina Adly McKenzie of Zap2it suspected the show had chosen a school shooting for storyline "to boost its dwindling ratings" and that "instead of making a real statement about guns in school, or about gun control in general, Glee shied away from the issue." Vulture's Lauren Hoffman gave the installment a one-star rating out of five, saying the show is not very good at tackling a big issue such as a school shooting, unlike My So-Called Life and Degrassi: The Next Generation. She wrote, "It seems far more respectful to point to real stories with real consequences as a means of generating awareness, rather than making up a story where everything turns out just fine in the end." She also pointed out that a problem was the insufficient time given to the actual shooting and its aftermath. Brandon Nowalk of The A.V. Club panned the episode as "exploitative trash", gave it an "F" grade, and wrote that it turned "a school shooting into another empty inspirational card".
