= Dynamic Duets =

- Glee episode
- Episode no.: Season 4 Episode 7
- Directed by: Ian Brennan
- Written by: Ian Brennan
- Production code: 4ARC07
- Original air date: November 22, 2012

Guest appearances
- Dot-Marie Jones as Shannon Beiste; Vanessa Lengies as Sugar Motta; Samuel Larsen as Joe Hart; Lauren Potter as Becky Jackson; Melissa Benoist as Marley Rose; Jacob Artist as Jake Puckerman; Blake Jenner as Ryder Lynn; Becca Tobin as Kitty Wilde; Grant Gustin as Sebastian Smythe; Nolan Gerard Funk as Hunter Clarington; Trisha Rae Stahl as Millie Rose; Jodi Harris as Mrs. Pathello

Episode chronology
← Previous "Glease"	Next → "Thanksgiving"
- Glee season 4

"Dynamic Duets" is the seventh episode of the fourth season of the American musical television series Glee, and the seventy-third episode overall. Written and directed by series co-creator Ian Brennan, it aired on Fox in the United States on November 22, 2012.

== Plot ==
Kitty Wilde (Becca Tobin) and Ryder Lynn (Blake Jenner) join New Directions just as their Nationals trophy is stolen by Hunter Clarington (Nolan Gerard Funk), the new captain of the Dalton Academy Warblers. Blaine Anderson (Darren Criss) goes to Dalton to retrieve it. There, Hunter and Sebastian Smythe (Grant Gustin) attempt to convince Blaine to return to the Warblers. After singing Kelly Clarkson's "Dark Side" with them, Blaine becomes conflicted about his future. Meanwhile, interim glee club director Finn Hudson (Cory Monteith), struggling to convince New Directions to view him as a leader, takes inspiration from McKinley High's superhero club, which several members of New Directions are part of, to create a week assignment named "Dynamic Duets", in which enemies are forced to work together, in order to prepare the club for Sectionals.

Jake Puckerman (Jacob Artist) and Ryder, who have been competing for Marley Rose's (Melissa Benoist) affections, are one of the pairs created by Finn, and serenade Marley with "Superman", but end up getting into a fight in the middle of their performance. Finn then gives them another assignment: to share their deepest fears with one another. Jake eventually admits that he feels insecure over being mixed-race and Jewish, while Ryder admits that he cannot read properly. Jake tells Finn about this, and Finn convinces Ryder to take a test, revealing that Ryder is dyslexic. He is directed to a professional and begins treatment to improve his studying.

Jake and Ryder become friends, and Ryder later defends Jake from jocks who were planning to beat him up. Conflicted about his feelings for Marley, knowing that he previously turned down her advances and that Ryder is now interested in her, Jake calls his half-brother Noah "Puck" Puckerman (Mark Salling), who is working as a street performer in Los Angeles, for advice. Puck advises Jake to not give up on Marley, but to play it cool for now and let her come to him.

Marley is paired with Kitty, who convinces Marley that she is putting on weight in order to further Marley's bulimia. Kitty pretends to become Marley's friend and they sing "Holding Out for a Hero". When Ryder cancels his date with Marley in order to prepare for a meeting with the special teacher, Kitty attempts to convince Marley that Ryder is ignoring her advances, but her plan backfires when Marley decides to date Jake.

Believing that he doesn't belong in New Directions after cheating on his boyfriend Kurt Hummel, Blaine decides to transfer to Dalton and rejoin the Warblers. Upon learning of this, Sam Evans (Chord Overstreet) convinces him that, despite having done a bad thing, Blaine is still a good person and an important member of New Directions. After performing several good deeds throughout the school, Blaine and Sam sing David Bowie's "Heroes" and Blaine decides to stay at McKinley. They return to Dalton one more time and steal back their trophy.

Having successfully brought the glee club closer together with his assignment, Finn is embraced by New Directions as a competent director. They later do a group performance of "Some Nights" in the school auditorium as Finn looks on.

== Production ==
This is the second episode both written and directed by Glee co-creator Ian Brennan.

The Dalton Academy Warblers return in this episode. Nolan Gerard Funk makes his debut as Hunter Clarington, the new leader of the Warblers. Last year's leader, recurring character Sebastian Smythe (Grant Gustin), also appears.

Other recurring characters in this episode include football coach Shannon Beiste (Dot-Marie Jones), glee club members Sugar Motta (Vanessa Lengies), Joe Hart (Samuel Larsen), Marley Rose (Melissa Benoist), and Jake Puckerman (Jacob Artist), cheerleaders Kitty Wilde (Becca Tobin) and Becky Jackson (Lauren Potter), football player Ryder Lynn (Jenner) and McKinley's lunch lady and Marley's mother Mrs. Rose (Trisha Rae Stahl). This is the first episode in which Matthew Morrison does not appear as Will Schuester, and both Rachel Berry (Lea Michele) and Kurt Hummel (Chris Colfer) are also absent. Other main characters absent from the episode include Sue Sylvester (Jane Lynch), Mercedes Jones (Amber Riley), Santana Lopez (Naya Rivera), Mike Chang (Harry Shum, Jr.), and Wade "Unique" Adams (Alex Newell).

== Reception ==
=== Ratings ===
The episode was watched by 4.62 million American viewers and garnered a 1.5/5 rating/share among adults 18-49. The episode's ratings drop is predicted to have been due to the show airing on Thanksgiving.

=== Critical reception ===
Screener copies of the episode were sent to reviewers in advance of the air date, and reaction has been positive. John Kubicek of BuddyTV loved the costume designs of the superhero versions of New Directions and called them "hilarious and totally Emmy-worthy". Laurel Brown of Zap2It called the episode "a super episode in every way".
