= Sweet Dreams (Glee) =

- Glee episode
- Episode no.: Season 4 Episode 19
- Directed by: Elodie Keene
- Written by: Ross Maxwell
- Production code: 4ARC19
- Original air date: April 18, 2013

Guest appearances
- Idina Menzel as Shelby Corcoran; Dot-Marie Jones as Shannon Beiste; NeNe Leakes as Roz Washington; Amy Aquino as a Funny Girl producer; Michael Lerner as Sidney Greene; Alex Newell as Wade "Unique" Adams; Lauren Potter as Becky Jackson; Melissa Benoist as Marley Rose; Jacob Artist as Jake Puckerman; Becca Tobin as Kitty Wilde; Blake Jenner as Ryder Lynn; Brad Benedict as Matt Cromley; Casey Deidrick as Chip

Episode chronology
← Previous "Shooting Star"	Next → "Lights Out"
- Glee season 4

"Sweet Dreams" is the nineteenth episode of the fourth season of the American musical television series Glee, and the eighty-fifth episode overall. Written by Ross Maxwell and directed by Elodie Keene, it aired on Fox in the United States on April 18, 2013. Special guest star Idina Menzel returns as Rachel's biological mother, Shelby Corcoran. This is the last episode to feature Cory Monteith as Finn Hudson, who missed the remainder of the season because he entered drug rehabilitation the week after filming, then died of an overdose three months after the episode aired.

== Plot ==
Glee club director Will Schuester (Matthew Morrison) announces that the theme for Regionals is "Dreams", and finds out that Roz Washington (Nene Leakes) has been called to replace Sue Sylvester (Jane Lynch) as coach of the Cheerios. Football coach Shannon Beiste (Dot-Marie Jones) encourages Will to make amends with Finn Hudson (Cory Monteith), who is attending the University of Lima with Noah "Puck" Puckerman (Mark Salling), but Finn rejects Will's apologies, stating that he is too busy with college.

In New York City, Rachel Berry (Lea Michele) is preparing for her audition for the revival of Funny Girl. Her biological mother, Shelby Corcoran (Idina Menzel) visits her and advises her not to perform one of the musical's songs and instead do something new. They then duet on "Next to Me". Meanwhile, Finn and Puck join a fraternity after performing "(You Gotta) Fight for Your Right (To Party!)" in a party after their sound system breaks down.

The New Directions disagrees with Will's set list for Regionals, and Marley Rose (Melissa Benoist) suggests that they perform original songs, but Will refuses. Marley later reunites Blaine Anderson (Darren Criss), Sam Evans (Chord Overstreet) and Wade "Unique" Adams (Alex Newell) at the auditorium, where they perform one of Marley's songs, "You Have More Friends Than You Know". Will overhears them and realizes he needs to listen to his students.

Rachel calls Finn to ask for a suggestion of what to perform in her audition, and Finn tells Rachel to sing something meaningful to her. Rachel then performs "Don't Stop Believin'", dedicating the song to her friends, and impressing the producers. Meanwhile, Puck encourages Finn to dedicate himself to becoming a teacher rather than partying, and Finn later meets with Will. They apologize to one another and decide to lead New Directions to Regionals together.

Rachel is invited for a callback for Funny Girl, while Blaine becomes suspicious that Becky Jackson (Lauren Potter) knows more about Sue's dismissal than she is letting everyone know. Meanwhile, Will apologizes to the New Directions for his past stubbornness, and asks Marley to teach them one of her original songs. The New Directions then perform Marley's song "Outcast" with her in the auditorium.

== Production ==
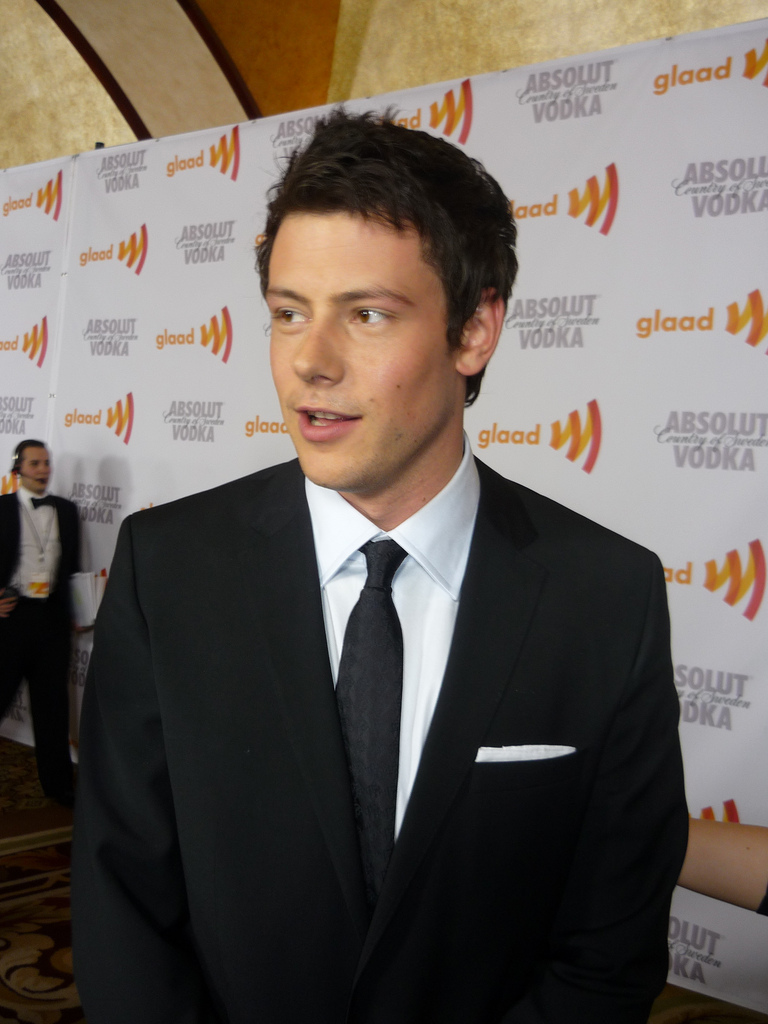
"Sweet Dreams" marked Cory Monteith's final appearance in the series

The episode was directed by Elodie Keene, having previously directed five episodes in season one, and written by Ross Maxwell.

Michele sings the show's million-selling hit from the pilot episode, Journey's "Don't Stop Believin'", as part of her character's Funny Girl audition. Michele recorded her vocals for the song on March 19, 2013, had dance rehearsal with the other five actors the next day, and the scene was shot two days later, March 21, 2013. Due to Monteith entering rehabilitation a week after filming was completed, and less than four months before his death, this episode marks Finn Hudson's final appearance on the show.

Special guest star Idina Menzel returns for the first time since the third season as Shelby Corcoran, who had previously coached both the Vocal Adrenaline and Troubletones show choirs. Also returning for the first time this season is NeNe Leakes as Coach Roz Washington.

Other recurring characters in this episode include McKinley's football coach Shannon Beiste (Dot-Marie Jones), glee club members Wade "Unique" Adams (Alex Newell), Marley Rose (Melissa Benoist), Jake Puckerman (Jacob Artist), Kitty Wilde (Becca Tobin) and Ryder Lynn (Blake Jenner), and cheerleader Becky Jackson (Lauren Potter).

Five songs from the episode are being released as singles, including the previously mentioned "Don't Stop Believin'". The other four are Emeli Sandé's "Next to Me" performed by Michele and Menzel, Beastie Boys' "Fight for Your Right (To Party)" performed by Mark Salling and Cory Monteith, "You Have More Friends Than You Know" written by Mervyn Warren and Jeff Marx and performed by Darren Criss, Chord Overstreet, Newell and Benoist, and an original song: "Outcast" performed by Benoist, Artist, Newell, Jenner and Tobin. The song "You Have More Friends Than You Know" was written for a show centered on the "It Gets Better" campaign. A portion of the proceeds from digital sale of the tracks will go to support The Trevor Project.

== Reception ==
=== Ratings ===
The episode was watched by 6.14 million American viewers, and received 2.1/6 adults 18/49 rating/share, placing second in its timeslot behind a repeat of The Big Bang Theory. This episode saw a decrease from the previous episode "Shooting Star," which was watched by 6.67 million viewers and received a 2.4/6 18/49 rating/share.

Via DVR, the episode was watched by 2.36 million viewers and received an 18-49 rating of 1.1, bringing the total to 8.50 million viewers and a rating of 3.2.

=== Critical reception ===
Laurel Brown of Zap2it gave the episode a positive review, calling "the absurdity of Sam's twin especially entertaining," and applauding Rachel's Broadway audition, calling it "amusingly reminiscent of the Smash pilot." She did, however, criticize how the plot shifted sharply from the previous school shooting episode, saying "it came only a week after a school-shooting episode. That's not something that can be taken lightly and then blown-off by a single line about Coach Roz growing up in the ghetto. That is, however, just what Glee did. Yes, the weird behavior of people like Sam was attributed to "PTSD," but these emotions were played for laughs. The only true follow-up to the shooting was the impressively underplayed moment between Blaine and Becky."
