= Naked (Glee) =

- Glee episode
- Episode no.: Season 4 Episode 12
- Directed by: Ian Brennan
- Written by: Ryan Murphy
- Production code: 4ARC12
- Original air date: January 31, 2013

Guest appearances
- Jayma Mays as Emma Pillsbury; Dianna Agron as Quinn Fabray; Iqbal Theba as Principal Figgins; Alex Newell as Wade "Unique" Adams; Samuel Larsen as Joe Hart; Melissa Benoist as Marley Rose; Jacob Artist as Jake Puckerman; Becca Tobin as Kitty Wilde; Dean Geyer as Brody Weston; Blake Jenner as Ryder Lynn; Nolan Gerard Funk as Hunter Clarington; Jacob Wysocki as the cameraman; Leah Pipes as Electra; Lauren Potter as Becky Jackson; Bill A. Jones as Rod Remington; Earlene Davis as Andrea Carmichael

Episode chronology
← Previous "Sadie Hawkins"	Next → "Diva"
- Glee season 4

"Naked" is the twelfth episode of the fourth season of the American musical television series Glee, and the seventy-eighth episode overall. Written and directed by co-creators Ryan Murphy and Ian Brennan, respectively, it aired on Fox in the United States on January 31, 2013.

== Plot ==
The Dalton Academy Warblers are exposed for using steroids for their participation in Sectionals, and New Directions is given another chance to compete in Regionals. To raise money for the bus, Tina Cohen-Chang (Jenna Ushkowitz) successfully proposes they make a sexy "Men of McKinley" calendar with the male members of the New Directions.

Meanwhile, in New York City, Rachel Berry (Lea Michele) is asked to star in a student film, but becomes conflicted when she learns the role requires her to be topless. After singing "Torn", Rachel decides to go through with it. Although her boyfriend Brody Weston (Dean Geyer) supports her, Kurt Hummel (Chris Colfer) does not agree with her decision and calls Quinn Fabray (Dianna Agron) and Santana Lopez (Naya Rivera) to convince Rachel not to do it, but Rachel remains decided.

In Lima, Principal Figgins (Iqbal Theba) informs Brittany Pierce (Heather Morris) that she had excellent grades in her SATs, but her boyfriend Sam Evans (Chord Overstreet) had a terrible score. Sam becomes convinced that he can only rely on his body to be successful, and through a mash-up of "Centerfold" and "Hot in Herre", pushes the guys of New Directions for the calendar, causing conflict with Artie Abrams (Kevin McHale), who is uncomfortable with his body. Cheerleading coach Sue Sylvester (Jane Lynch) tries to stop the calendar from being released, but Finn (Cory Monteith) blackmails her with her own nude photoshoot for Penthouse magazine.

Brittany also convinces Marley Rose (Melissa Benoist) to declare her feelings for Jake Puckerman (Jacob Artist). They duet on "A Thousand Years", but Marley cannot bring herself to say it. Advised by Ryder Lynn (Blake Jenner), Jake then declares his feelings through a performance of "Let Me Love You (Until You Learn to Love Yourself)", and Marley reciprocates his feelings. Meanwhile, Blaine convinces Sam to stop pushing himself so hard, and, with help from guidance counselor Emma Pillsbury (Jayma Mays), selects colleges that do not require good SAT scores.

In New York City, Rachel eventually decides not to do the topless scene and thanks Quinn and Santana for their support. They perform "Love Song" together, and Santana voices her interest in moving to New York City. Meanwhile, in Lima, Sam apologizes to Artie for his actions, and convinces Tina to change the themes of the calendar so Artie can pose without having to be nude. They then join the others in a performance of "This Is the New Year".

== Production ==
The episode was written by Glee co-creator Ryan Murphy and directed by a second co-creator, Ian Brennan.

Murphy tweeted a picture from the Men of McKinley calendar shoot for this episode over the weekend of December 15, 2012; the calendar was subsequently confirmed to be in an upcoming episode.

One of the songs in the episode, "Torn", is performed by Michele as a duet between the "old" Rachel and "new" Rachel after Rachel has been cast in a student film; her role includes a topless sequence. Shooting the song required her to perform the entire song twice, once as each of the two Rachels: "they're syncing it together to have me on-screen together".

Recurring characters in this episode include school guidance counselor Emma Pillsbury (Jayma Mays), Yale student Quinn Fabray (Dianna Agron), and glee club members Joe Hart (Samuel Larsen), Wade "Unique" Adams (Alex Newell), Marley Rose (Melissa Benoist), Jake Puckerman (Jacob Artist), Kitty Wilde (Becca Tobin) and Ryder Lynn (Blake Jenner), Principal Figgins (Iqbal Theba), cheerleader Becky Jackson (Lauren Potter), NYADA junior Brody Weston (Dean Geyer), local television news anchors Rod Remington (Bill A. Jones) and Andrea Carmichael (Earlene Davis), and Hunter Clarington (Nolan Gerard Funk), captain of the Dalton Academy Warblers. Amber Riley's character, Mercedes Jones, also does a cameo, in a testimony video where she tells how Sam was good to her.

Seven of the songs from the episode are being released as six singles: Natalie Imbruglia's cover of Ednaswap's "Torn" performed by Michele; A Great Big World's "This Is the New Year" performed by New Directions, Christina Perri's "A Thousand Years" performed by Benoist and Artist; Ne-Yo's "Let Me Love You (Until You Learn to Love Yourself)"; Sara Bareilles's "Love Song" performed by Michele, Agron and Naya Rivera; and a mashup of The J. Geils Band's "Centerfold" and Nelly's "Hot in Herre" as one single, performed by Artist, Chord Overstreet, Jenner and Becca Tobin.

== Reception ==
=== Ratings ===
The episode was watched by 5.58 million American viewers, and garnered a 2.1/6 rating/share among adults 18–49. The show placed fourth in its timeslot behind Person of Interest, Grey's Anatomy, and a one-hour broadcast of The Office. This episode was down significantly from the previous episode "Sadie Hawkins," which was watched by 6.79 million viewers.

=== Critical response ===
The episode garnered mixed to positive reviews from critics. Lauren Hoffman of Vulture said regarding Rachel's topless scene that her getting cold feet was "okay. [But] I wish Glee had done a bit more to show that it would've been okay if she’d gone through with the topless shoot. I know that’s dangerous territory, but it’s territory Glee will need to figure out how to tread if it’s going to be a show about college kids for high-school kids." Laurel Brown of Zap2it said, "It's really too bad that only one female newsreader realizes the insanity of it all. But if everybody realized the insanity, there would be no more Glee." She complimented the Marley and Jake subplot, dubbing it "one of the sweetest storylines ever to be seen on Glee... The sweetness culminates in Jake writing that he loves Marley on one of the calendars. Her "I love you back" is just about enough to make you cry with loving happiness."

Many critics highlighted the scene with Quinn and Santana. Ryan Gajewski of Wetpaint wrote, "Frankly, the idea of Quinn and Santana acting as the angel on Rachel’s shoulder was hilarious and awesome, and the three of them performing “Love Song” was magical." Josee Rose of The Wall Street Journal applauded Quinn and Santana's return in the episode, "It’s nice to hear Quinn and Santana again, there definitely isn't enough of them this season. And they also set it up for Santana to move to the Big Apple." Daniel Sperling of Digital Spy assessed, "There's no denying that most of the semi-nudity is gratuitous, and initially Glee tries to offset this by overloading the episode with ideas." Sperling noted, "it's when 'Naked' quits being superficial and peers a little deeper that it starts to perk up." He also complimented Quinn and Santana's appearance, "Their brief cameo works wonders."

Rae Votta from Billboard gave the episode a positive review, "Glee stripped down this week in an episode that highlighted nakedness (physical and emotional) of its characters, plus provided fans with the utter eye candy of shirtless dudes in crazy costumes, a landscape of equal parts nostalgia and current pop hits, and realistic storylines that didn't make the viewer want to tear out his or her hair. There's not much to dislike about Glee right now." MaryAnn Sleasman of TV.com said "In a season that's been plagued by uneven quality, "Naked" ended up being pleasantly enjoyable.." Lesley Goldberg of The Hollywood Reporter wrote that the cover of "This is the New Year" by A Great Big World was "one of the most dynamic and appropriate songs the show has covered of late (if ever). It's filled with cute moments from Sam and Blaine and from Sam and Artie and one tremendously funny eye-roll from Kitty."
