= Sadie Hawkins (Glee) =

- Glee episode
- Episode no.: Season 4 Episode 11
- Directed by: Bradley Buecker
- Written by: Ross Maxwell
- Production code: 4ARC11
- Original air date: January 24, 2013

Guest appearances
- Dot-Marie Jones as Shannon Beiste; Vanessa Lengies as Sugar Motta; Alex Newell as Wade "Unique" Adams; Samuel Larsen as Joe Hart; Melissa Benoist as Marley Rose; Jacob Artist as Jake Puckerman; Becca Tobin as Kitty Wilde; Dean Geyer as Brody Weston; Blake Jenner as Ryder Lynn; Oliver Kieran-Jones as Adam Crawford; Lauren Potter as Becky Jackson; Ashley Fink as Lauren Zizes; Nolan Gerard Funk as Hunter Clarington

Episode chronology
← Previous "Glee, Actually"	Next → "Naked"
- Glee season 4

"Sadie Hawkins" is the eleventh episode of the fourth season of the American musical television series Glee, and the seventy-seventh episode overall. Written by Ross Maxwell and directed by Bradley Buecker, it aired on Fox in the United States on January 24, 2013.

== Plot ==
Tina Cohen-Chang convinces Blaine Anderson to organize a Sadie Hawkins dance at McKinley to empower the female students. Glee club director Finn Hudson decides to have the female members of New Directors perform to the people they want to invite to the dance, and Tina sings "I Don't Know How to Love Him" for Blaine, having developed a crush on him. However, Blaine declines her invitation, having himself developed a crush on Sam Evans, who is investigating the possibility whether the Dalton Academy Warblers cheated at Sectionals.

In New York City, Kurt Hummel joins the New York Academy of Dramatic Arts (NYADA), and with Rachel Berry occupied with her relationship with Brody Weston, Kurt decides to join NYADA's glee club, the Adam's Apples, to make new friends. Rachel tells Kurt not to, as it would be "social suicide", although Kurt becomes interested in the club's captain, Adam Crawford, who impresses him with a performance of Jonathan Coulton's cover of "Baby Got Back". Kurt later asks Adam out on a date.

In Lima, Brittany Pierce convinces Marley Rose to invite Jake Puckerman to the dance with a performance of "Tell Him", but Jake becomes divided when Kitty Wilde also invites him. His brother, Noah "Puck" Puckerman, convinces him to go with Marley and ends up going with Kitty himself. Meanwhile, Blaine confides with Tina about his crush on Sam, and they decide to go together as friends.

At the dance, the guys of New Directions perform "No Scrubs", followed by the girls' performance of "Locked Out of Heaven". There, Sam reveals to Blaine and Finn evidence that he has acquired that Warblers captain Hunter Clarington had the Warblers use steroids to enhance their performance, which Finn decides to use against the Warblers after getting more information from Trent, one of the Warblers who refused to take the steroids.

Ryder Lynn ends the dance with a performance of "I Only Have Eyes for You" while Jake and Marley begin a relationship. Rachel invites Brody to move in with her.

== Production ==
The episode was written by Ross Maxwell and directed by Glee co-executive producer Bradley Buecker.

Oliver Kieran-Jones joins the recurring cast as Adam Crawford, the leader of NYADA's glee club, Adam’s Apples, and sings a song in this episode. Ashley Fink returns as former New Directions member and wrestling champion Lauren Zizes for the first time since early in the show's third season. Other recurring characters in this episode include glee club members Sugar Motta (Vanessa Lengies), Joe Hart (Samuel Larsen), Wade "Unique" Adams (Alex Newell), Marley Rose (Melissa Benoist), Jake Puckerman (Jacob Artist), Kitty Wilde (Becca Tobin) and Ryder Lynn (Blake Jenner), football coach Shannon Beiste (Dot-Marie Jones), cheerleader Becky Jackson (Lauren Potter), NYADA junior Brody Weston (Geyer), and the captain of the Dalton Academy Warblers, Hunter Clarington (Nolan Gerard Funk).

The episode features six songs, all of which are being released as singles, including "I Don't Know How to Love Him" from Jesus Christ Superstar performed by Jenna Ushkowitz; "Tell Him" by The Exciters performed by Heather Morris and Benoist; "Locked Out of Heaven" by Bruno Mars performed by Newell and Benoist; "No Scrubs" by TLC performed by Kevin McHale, Darren Criss, Overstreet, Larsen and Jenner; and "I Only Have Eyes for You" by The Flamingos performed by Jenner. The sixth song is Jonathan Coulton's arrangement of Sir Mix-a-Lot's "Baby Got Back", used without permission or attribution, performed by new cast member Oliver Kieran Jones. In response, Coulton re-released his version as "Baby Got Back (In the Style of Glee)", a "cover of Glee’s cover of my cover of Sir Mix-a-Lot’s song, which is to say it’s EXACTLY THE SAME as my original version". Coulton said he would donate the proceeds from all sales until the end of February 2013 to two Glee-related charities: The VH1 Save the Music Foundation, and The It Gets Better Project.

== Reception ==
=== Ratings ===
2.80 million Americans watched the episode through DVR playback, with a 1.4 rating among adults 18-49.

In Australia, the episode garnered 269 000 viewers, one of the worst recorded for a prime time slot, and was subsequently moved to the digital only channel Eleven, beginning with the following episode, Naked.
