= Glee season 4 =

2012–13 season of American musical comedy drama

Glee
- Season 4
- Promotional poster and home media cover art
- Starring: Chris Colfer; Darren Criss; Jane Lynch; Kevin McHale; Lea Michele; Cory Monteith; Heather Morris; Matthew Morrison; Chord Overstreet; Amber Riley; Naya Rivera; Mark Salling; Harry Shum Jr.; Jenna Ushkowitz
- No. of episodes: 22

Release
- Original network: Fox
- Original release: September 13, 2012 – May 9, 2013

Season chronology
- ← Previous; Season 3 Next → Season 5

The fourth season of the Fox musical comedy-drama television series Glee was commissioned on April 9, 2012. It premiered on September 13, 2012, and is produced by 20th Century Fox Television, Ryan Murphy Television and Brad Falchuk Teley-Vision with executive producers Dante Di Loreto and series co-creators Ryan Murphy, Brad Falchuk and Ian Brennan.

The series features the New Directions glee club at the fictional William McKinley High School in the town of Lima, Ohio. The fourth season continues in Lima with a new generation of students but will also follow some of the McKinley graduates from the third season, notably to the fictional New York Academy of the Dramatic Arts (NYADA) in New York City. The season follows the club competing on the show choir circuit, while its members, faculty and alumni deal with sex, bulimia, gender identity, child molestation, dyslexia, school violence, pregnancy scares and other social issues. As of the season premiere, fourteen main cast members retained that status from the third season: glee club director Will Schuester (Matthew Morrison), cheerleading coach Sue Sylvester (Jane Lynch), glee club members Artie Abrams (Kevin McHale), Blaine Anderson (Darren Criss), Tina Cohen-Chang (Jenna Ushkowitz), and Brittany Pierce (Heather Morris), and graduates Rachel Berry (Lea Michele), Mike Chang (Harry Shum Jr.), Finn Hudson (Cory Monteith), Kurt Hummel (Chris Colfer), Mercedes Jones (Amber Riley), Santana Lopez (Naya Rivera) and Noah "Puck" Puckerman (Mark Salling). Previously recurring character Sam Evans (Chord Overstreet), a glee club member, was promoted to the main cast in the fourth season.

Dianna Agron, who played Quinn Fabray, appeared less frequently in the season than in previous ones, as did some of the other actors from the first three seasons, including Riley, Shum Jr. and Salling, despite still being credited as main cast members. Agron and Jayma Mays, who continued to appear as guidance counselor Emma Pillsbury, were credited as guest stars this season rather than as series regulars.

This season marked the final appearance of Monteith on the show before his death on July 13, 2013. The season was nominated for four Primetime Emmy Awards including one for Lynch's performance as Sue Sylvester and the Screen Actors Guild Award for Outstanding Performance by an Ensemble in a Comedy Series.

== Production ==
=== Development ===
The fourth season continued with McKinley High in Lima, Ohio as the primary setting, while also following several of the just-graduated characters to New York City and the fictional performing arts school (NYADA). The Ohio portion of the show featured a number of new characters.

Co-creator Ryan Murphy had confirmed that all regular cast members from the third season will be returning to the show for its fourth season, though "it doesn't mean everyone will be doing 22 episodes".

Fox announced on May 14, 2012, that Glee would be moving to Thursday nights at 9 pm ET for the fourth season. Episodes aired after that evening's 8 pm ET music competition "results" shows—The X Factor in the fall and American Idol in midseason. The season premiered on September 13, 2012 with the second episode of the season serving as the show's second Britney Spears tribute, featuring eight of her songs.

In the UK, Glee airs as part of Sky 1 Sundays at 8pm and broadcast began on January 6, 2013.

Some changes were made to the show's writing staff. Marti Noxon announced that she would no longer be a writer or consulting producer on the show, and co-executive producer and writer Ali Adler stated that she would be scaling back her work on Glee to focus on her new NBC comedy The New Normal, which she co-created with Murphy.

On July 14, 2012, Glee attended San Diego Comic-Con in California. Co-creator Brad Falchuk revealed that Damian McGinty (Rory) would not be returning in the fall but stated he could return in the spring. Falchuk announced that Vanessa Lengies (Sugar) and Samuel Larsen (Joe) would be returning. Falchuk also had aspirations to bring back Alex Newell (Wade) at some point during Season 4. Other season details include the following: Sue had her baby when Season 4 commenced; episodes alternated between Ohio and New York, much like McKinley High and Dalton Academy in Season 2; and Kurt (Chris Colfer) remained in Ohio before moving to New York. Brad Falchuk also revealed that Will (Matthew Morrison) and Emma (Jayma Mays) would still be engaged when the season began, and he went on to state there would be many new faces during the season, also commenting that Rachel would have a roommate and new friends in New York. Season 4 featured a teaming up of Coach Roz (NeNe Leakes) and Sue (Jane Lynch) to take down Principal Figgins (Iqbal Theba).

On July 31, 2012, executive producer Murphy revealed on his Twitter account that the first group number of the season would be a cover of Adele's "Chasing Pavements". Murphy also tweeted that there would be an episode titled "The Break-Up" and a two-part Thanksgiving episode in which the Sectionals competition will take place. Murphy also stated that the show would be doing another Christmas episode this season.

Executive producer Falchuk stated that Season 4 will not revolve around relationships as much as past seasons, commenting, "Relationships in general will be less of a focus this year, I personally think a lot of these characters are more interesting not in relationships. And I think with a lot of them we will be exploring that. Whether they break up or not, we’re really focused on giving them more individual stories."

=== Filming ===
Season four of Glee began filming on Tuesday, July 24, 2012. A substantial amount of exterior shots depicting New York City were shot on location in that city. Studio recording for the season began earlier, by July 19, 2012, with Jenna Ushkowitz and Heather Morris recording on that day.

== Episodes ==
No. overall	No. in season	Title	Directed by	Written by	Original release date	Prod. code	US viewers (millions)
67	1	"The New Rachel"	Brad Falchuk	Ryan Murphy	September 13, 2012	4ARC01	7.41
Rachel begins school at NYADA, where she bonds with junior Brody Weston and accidentally offends her tough dance instructor, Cassandra July, who begins to push Rachel as much as she can. At McKinley High, the rebuilding of New Directions begins; Wade "Unique" Adams transfers schools to join the group, who have become popular after winning Nationals. Tina, Brittany, Blaine, and Unique compete to see who will be "The New Rachel". Kurt aids director Will Schuester in finding potential recruits, which includes the timid Marley Rose and Puck's half brother Jake, who refuses to join the group when he is not allowed to finish his audition song. Marley is welcomed into New Directions, but is upset when she hears them making fun of an obese lunch lady, whom she reveals is her mother. The glee club members apologize, and their actions motivate head cheerleader Kitty Wilde to deem them unpopular once more. Blaine encourages Kurt to go to New York and follow his dreams.
68	2	"Britney 2.0"	Alfonso Gomez-Rejon	Brad Falchuk	September 20, 2012	4ARC02	7.46
Sue kicks Brittany off the Cheerios due to her bad grades and replaces her with Kitty, causing Brittany to become depressed. Hoping to cheer her up, Emma convinces Will to have New Directions perform Britney Spears' songs to help Brittany find inspiration. Brittany reveals to Sam that she misses Santana, who is attending University of Louisville. Sam tells Brittany that he will be her friend, and Britany later convinces Sue to reinstate her on the Cheerios. Rachel confronts Cassandra for picking on her students; Cassandra explains that she wants to show them the harsh realities of the show business world. Marley expresses a romantic interest in Jake, and the two share a romantic moment. Puck returns after being called by Will; he meets Jake for the first time and encourages him to join New Directions. Jake later tells Marley that he is joining the group, but she is upset to learn that he is dating Kitty.
69	3	"Makeover"	Eric Stoltz	Ian Brennan	September 27, 2012	4ARC03	5.79
Blaine and Sam run against Brittany and Artie for the student council and win. Sue advises Will to seek a new project, deducing that he has lost his passion after achieving his goal at leading New Directions into winning Nationals; Will later tells Emma that he is considering joining a blue ribbon government panel to improve on arts education nationwide. Kurt gets an internship in New York at Vogue.com working for Isabelle Wright; the two give Rachel a makeover, after which Isabelle advises him to consider pursuing a career in fashion. Blaine is distraught over Kurt's absence and confides his frustrations to Sam. Rachel starts to warm up to Brody and invites him to her and Kurt's apartment for dinner. The two share their first kiss, but are interrupted by a knock on the door. Thinking it is Kurt, Rachel is surprised to instead see her former fiancé Finn.
70	4	"The Break Up"	Alfonso Gomez-Rejon	Ryan Murphy	October 4, 2012	4ARC04	6.07
Finn, who has been discharged from the Army, feels out of place in Rachel's life at NYADA and becomes suspicious of Brody. Feeling left behind in their relationship, Blaine briefly cheats on Kurt before realizing his error, and he surprises Kurt by visiting him in New York City. Finn and Kurt confront their respective partners; Blaine admits his infidelity, and Rachel admits to kissing Brody. The following day, Finn leaves without telling Rachel and returns to Lima, where he reunites with Will and meets the new members of New Directions. Santana and Brittany break up due to the long distance between them. Jake breaks up with Kitty after she mistreats Marley. Will is accepted into the government panel, which requires him to move to Washington for several months, but Emma is reluctant to leave Lima. Rachel returns to Lima to confront Finn, lambasting him for hiding from her for months, and breaks up with him.
71	5	"The Role You Were Born to Play"	Brad Falchuk	Michael Hitchcock	November 8, 2012	4ARC05	5.68
The McKinley High production of Grease is being cast, and after Artie recruits Finn to help him direct, he calls in McKinley graduates Mercedes and Mike to help him and Finn with auditions for the musical. Competitors for the lead role of Danny include Jake and football player Ryder Lynn, who is struggling with his grades. Meanwhile, Kitty auditions for the lead role of Sandy to spite Marley, while Sue objects to Finn's plan to cast Unique for the female role of Rizzo. The cast list for the musical is announced, with Ryder as Danny, Marley as Sandy, Jake as Putzie and Kitty as Patty. Finn agrees to take over New Directions while Will is in Washington, while Emma decides to stay in Lima; Will and Emma agree to visit each other on weekends, and to marry once Will has returned.
72	6	"Glease"	Michael Uppendahl	Roberto Aguirre-Sacasa	November 15, 2012	4ARC06	5.22
Sue opposes to Finn's new role as interim director of New Directions, citing his age and lack of qualifications, and declares her truce with the glee club to be over. The McKinley High production of Grease opens, and Santana returns to replace Unique, who has been pulled out to perform by her parents. Rachel lands an audition for an off-Broadway production, and she and Kurt return to Lima to watch the musical. While they are away, Cassandra seduces Brody to spite Rachel. Kitty convinces Marley that she is genetically predisposed to be overweight and that she needs to induce vomit in order to maintain a healthy weight. Ryder finds Marley trying to vomit in the bathroom; he convinces her against inducing vomit, and later kisses her backstage as Jake looks on. The New Directions celebrate the positive reviews of Grease, and Will says his goodbyes to the glee club as Finn officially takes over.
73	7	"Dynamic Duets"	Ian Brennan	Ian Brennan	November 22, 2012	4ARC07	4.62
As Kitty and Ryder join New Directions, Finn assigns the glee club members to perform duets. Jake and Ryder, who have been competing for Marley's affections, are paired by Finn, who advises them to share their deepest fears with one another. Jake admits that he feels insecure over being mixed-race and Jewish, while Ryder admits that he cannot read properly. Finn convinces Ryder to take a test, after which Ryder learns he is dyslexic. Kitty pretends to befriend Marley, who decides to date Jake. The glee club's Nationals trophy is stolen by Hunter Clarington, the new captain of the Warblers. Blaine visits Dalton and is given a tempting offer by Sebastian and Hunter to rejoin the Warblers. Despite contemplating, Blaine ultimately decides to stay at McKinley, and he and Sam return to Dalton to steal back their trophy.
74	8	"Thanksgiving"	Bradley Buecker	Russel Friend & Garrett Lerner	November 29, 2012	4ARC08	5.39
In preparation for Sectionals, Finn enlists McKinley graduates Quinn, Mercedes, Santana, Mike, and Puck—who are all home for the Thanksgiving holiday—to mentor the new members of New Directions. Ryder agrees to no longer romantically pursue Marley now that she is dating Jake, while Kitty falsely tells Quinn that Jake is pressuring Marley into having sex with him. Santana discovers that Kitty has given Marley laxatives in order to further Marley's bulimia, and expresses her concerns to Quinn. Rachel and Kurt celebrate Thanksgiving in New York; Rachel confronts Brody for having sex with Cassandra, but Brody reminds Rachel that she ignored him when Finn briefly visited her. Isabelle advises Kurt to mend his relationship with Blaine, and Kurt agrees to meet with Blaine during Christmas to determine the status of their relationship. At Sectionals, Marley begins to feel sick and collapses on-stage before their first song is finished.
75	9	"Swan Song"	Brad Falchuk	Stacy Traub	December 6, 2012	4ARC09	5.43
In the wake of Marley's collapse, the New Directions leave the stage to tend to Marley, disqualifying them from the competition; the Warblers are declared the winners of Sectionals. With New Directions' performance season over, Sue claims the choir room and auditorium for her own use, while the dejected glee club members take up other extracurricular activities. Brittany and Sam begin dating. Finn starts to contemplate his future with the glee club upon their loss and disbanding, but Rachel advises him to never give up on his dreams, after which Finn convinces the New Directions to regroup. In New York, Rachel gets invited to perform for the Winter Showcase by Carmen Tibideaux as the tension between her and Cassandra increases. At the showcase, Carmen gives Kurt a second chance to audition for NYADA by having him perform for the showcase's audience. Kurt's performance receives a standing ovation, and he is admitted to NYADA.
76	10	"Glee, Actually"	Adam Shankman	Matthew Hodgson	December 13, 2012	4ARC10	5.26
A tribute to the film Love, Actually with five different storylines all dealing with the holidays. Sam and Brittany reveal to each other that they believe in the 2012 Mayan apocalypse, and live as if it's the end of the world. The Puckermans, including half-brothers Puck and Jake and their mothers, come together for Hanukkah; Puck reveals that he will be staying in Lima. Artie suffers a head injury in which he slips on ice and experiences a dream sequence in which he reflects on what may have happened if he was never in a wheelchair and glee club never formed. In his black-and-white vision, Artie sees Rory as his guardian angel, reminding him of who he was to the glee club. Kurt spends Christmas with Blaine and his father in New York; Burt reveals that he has prostate cancer, but his chances for survival are very high. Sue struggles to get a Secret Santa present for Marley's mother, Millie, but has a change of heart after seeing Marley and Millie struggle.
77	11	"Sadie Hawkins"	Bradley Buecker	Ross Maxwell	January 24, 2013	4ARC11	6.79
Tina convinces Blaine to organize a Sadie Hawkins dance at McKinley, and Finn advises the female members of New Directions to perform to the people they want to invite to the dance. Tina sings to Blaine, having developed a crush on him, but Blaine declines her invitation, having himself developed a crush on Sam, who is investigating whether the Warblers cheated at Sectionals. Brittany convinces Marley to invite Jake, who becomes conflicted when Kitty also invites him. Puck convinces Jake to go with Marley and ends up going with Kitty himself. At the dance, Sam reveals to Blaine and Finn evidence that the Warblers had used steroids to enhance their performance. With Rachel preoccupied with Brody, Kurt decides to join NYADA's glee club, the Adam's Apples, to make new friends. He meets and forms a friendship with Adam, the leader of the group, and later asks Adam out on a date.
78	12	"Naked"	Ian Brennan	Ryan Murphy	January 31, 2013	4ARC12	5.48
The New Directions are reintegrated into the show choir competition after the Warblers are disqualified for using steroids to enhance their Sectionals performance. To raise money for the bus, Tina proposes they make a sexy "Men of McKinley" calendar with the male members of New Directions. Sue tries to prevent the calendar from being released, but Finn blackmails her with her own nude photoshoot for Penthouse. After discovering that Artie is self-conscious about his body, Sam convinces Tina to change the themes of the calendar to make Artie more comfortable. Meanwhile, Brittany and Ryder separately try to convince Marley and Jake to declare their feelings for one another. After being called by Kurt, Quinn and Santana visit Rachel in New York to advise her not to shoot a nude scene for a student film project. In the process, Santana voices her interest in moving to New York City.
79	13	"Diva"	Paris Barclay	Brad Falchuk	February 7, 2013	4ARC13	6.03
Concerned New Directions doesn't have the killer instinct to win at Regionals, Finn assigns the club to let loose their inner divas. Tina struggles with her romantic feelings for Blaine. With Will away, Emma is distressed over preparations for the upcoming wedding; Finn briefly kisses Emma to calm her down. Kurt objects to Rachel's arrogant attitude and challenges her to a sing-off for bragging rights at NYADA. Kurt is declared the winner, shaking Rachel's confidence, but Kurt reassures her of her talent and encourages her to audition for an upcoming production of Funny Girl. Santana returns to Lima to perform for New Directions and attempts to undermine Brittany and Sam's relationship. Sue reveals that she knows Santana has dropped out of college and offers her an interim coach position for the Cheerios, but Santana instead decides to relocate to New York and move in with Rachel and Kurt, much to their surprise.
80	14	"I Do"	Brad Falchuk	Ian Brennan	February 14, 2013	4ARC14	5.13
Past and present New Directions members return to Lima to attend Will and Emma's Valentine's Day wedding, where they are invited to be the singers. Emma is extremely anxious about the wedding and is unable to go through with it, leaving Will at the altar. Will leaves to search for her, but agrees to proceed with the wedding reception. Kurt and Blaine briefly rekindle their relationship, causing a jealous Tina to accidentally reveal that she's in love with Blaine. Ryder is disappointed when Jake voices his belief that he'll have sex with Marley. Santana and Quinn get drunk and flirt with each other, while Finn confronts Rachel and proclaims that they are meant to be together. That night, Finn and Rachel, Kurt and Blaine, and Santana and Quinn have sex. Marley decides not to have sex with Jake, but ends up getting kissed by Ryder. Rachel returns to New York City and reunites with Brody; she is later seen taking a pregnancy test.
81	15	"Girls (and Boys) On Film"	Ian Brennan	Michael Hitchcock	March 7, 2013	4ARC15	6.72
Reeling from being left at the altar, Will states that movies and films are another way to calm people down from the day-to-day anxieties, and assigns the New Directions to perform songs from their favorite movies. Marley confesses that Ryder kissed her on Valentine's Day, angering Jake. Finn tricks Emma's parents into revealing that she's at her sister's house, and convinces Will to fight to get her back. Emma admits to Will that she ran away because she feels she doesn't know Will anymore; they agree to take their relationship slowly. Will is enraged when Finn admits that he kissed Emma to calm her down before the wedding. While Adam, Kurt, Rachel and Santana are snowbound, Santana voices her suspicions that Brody is a drug dealer after finding a large amount of money in his possession, irritating Rachel. Santana later discovers that Rachel may be pregnant after discovering a pregnancy test.
82	16	"Feud"	Bradley Buecker	Roberto Aguirre-Sacasa	March 14, 2013	4ARC16	5.37
After visiting a clinic, Rachel discovers that she is not pregnant. Santana remains convinced that Brody is hiding something and confronts Brody at NYADA, causing Kurt and Rachel to kick her out of their apartment. As tensions rise between Will and Finn, the New Directions members deal with their own conflicts by performing songs created by feuding artists. Since working with Will is untenable, Finn decides to leave New Directions. Ryder starts online chatting with a mysterious girl named Katie, who convinces him to make amends with Marley and Jake. Sue forces Blaine to rejoin the Cheerios, unaware that he and Sam are scheming to prevent her from further threatening the glee club after they graduate. Brody is revealed to be a gigolo; Santana discovers Brody's secret and informs Finn, who travels to New York to confront him. Finn beats Brody in a motel and threatens to tell Rachel the truth if Brody doesn't leave her alone.
83	17	"Guilty Pleasures"	Eric Stoltz	Russel Friend & Garrett Lerner	March 21, 2013	4ARC17	5.91
While Will is out sick, Sam and Blaine take over the glee club and assign the New Directions to perform their musical guilty pleasures in order to strengthen their bond between its members. Blaine admits to Sam that he has a crush on him; Sam reveals that he's known for a while and respects Blaine's feelings as they reaffirm their friendship. The New Direction girls confront Jake for his plans to perform a Chris Brown song, leading to a discussion about differentiating an artist's personal life from their work. Santana returns to Rachel and Kurt's loft, while Brody moves out after his fight with Finn. Santana reveals to Rachel that Brody was a gigolo, after which Rachel confronts Brody at NYADA to cut off their relationship. Rachel later thanks Santana for not giving up on trying to make her see the truth.
84	18	"Shooting Star"	Bradley Buecker	Matthew Hodgson	April 11, 2013	4ARC18	6.67
After Brittany predicts that a meteor will strike Lima, Will assigns the kids the theme "Last Chance" to inspire them to live each day as if it could be their last. His lesson prompts a confession from Coach Beiste, who confesses that she has feelings for Will, but he reveals that he has gotten back together with Emma. Ryder spots Katie at school, only to discover that her name is Marissa and that she never texted Ryder. While the glee club gathers in the choir room, two gunshots are heard, and the school goes into lockdown. As Will and Beiste try to keep the students calm, Kitty breaks down and admits to Marley that she altered her Sandy costumes; they embrace. Ryder calls Katie's phone, and it rings inside the choir room. After the police clear the area, Sue announces that the gun belonged to her and misfired, in order to cover up for Becky, who had stolen her father's gun and brought it to school. Principal Figgins is forced to fire Sue, but Will remains convinced of her innocence.
85	19	"Sweet Dreams"	Elodie Keene	Ross Maxwell	April 18, 2013	4ARC19	6.14
Rachel psyches herself up for her audition to play "Fanny Brice" in an all-new Broadway production of Funny Girl. She gets a surprise visit from Shelby, who advises her against performing one of the musical's songs. After Finn advises her to sing something meaningful to her, Rachel performs "Don't Stop Believin'", dedicating the song to her friends – visualising their original performance ("Pilot") during the audition. She impresses the producers and she is invited for a callback. Marley suggests to Will that they perform original songs at Regionals. Roz replaces Sue as coach of the Cheerios, while Blaine becomes suspicious that Becky knows more information about Sue's dismissal. Beiste encourages Will to make amends with Finn, who has settled into new life as a college student at The University of Lima with Puck. While he initially takes to the school's party atmosphere with ease, Puck encourages Finn to dedicate himself to becoming a teacher, and Finn later meets with Will to reconcile. Note: This is Cory Monteith's last appearance as Finn.
86	20	"Lights Out"	Paris Barclay	Ryan Murphy	April 25, 2013	4ARC20	5.24
Will discovers that the lead singer of rival glee club The Hoosierdaddies is Frida Romero, who has a powerful voice. McKinley High loses power, and New Directions performs acoustically while electricity is unavailable. Ryder continues his effort to meet "Katie" and admits to Jake that he told her his biggest secret. After being encouraged by Jake to share it with the club, Ryder reveals that he was sexually abused by his female babysitter when he was a child. Kitty consoles Ryder, revealing that she transferred to McKinley after being molested by her best friend's older brother. Isabelle recruits Kurt to help out at a company-sponsored event to raise money for charity; Rachel and Santana join along, during which Santana is inspired to sign up for extension classes at NYADA. Unimpressed with Roz's coaching style, Blaine and Becky try to convince Sue to return to the Cheerios, but she refuses. Becky later meets with Principal Figgins, as she wants to tell him something important.
87	21	"Wonder-ful"	Wendey Stanzler	Brad Falchuk	May 2, 2013	4ARC21	5.19
Will encourages the New Directions to perform Stevie Wonder songs to celebrate the wonderful things in their lives. Rachel worries when Cassandra finds out about her Funny Girl audition, but is surprised when Cassandra congratulates her; Cassandra tells Rachel that her bullying and apparent hate was meant to push her into becoming a better artist. Mercedes, who is recording her first album, returns to Lima with Mike and Kurt to help the New Directions prepare for Regionals. Mercedes cancels her contract when the record label tries to force her to change her image, and instead plans to pursue her dreams through different means. Kurt discovers that Burt's cancer is in remission. Artie has been accepted into a film school in New York City, but is scared of how his mother will react to him living by himself. Kitty steps in by telling Artie's mother about his feelings on leaving; Artie's mother later confronts him and shows her support, after which an emboldened Artie decides to go to New York.
88	22	"All or Nothing"	Bradley Buecker	Ian Brennan	May 9, 2013	4ARC22	5.92
Rachel has her Funny Girl callback whilst the New Directions take on the Hoosierdaddies and the Waffletoots at Regionals. Ryder refuses to perform at Regionals unless "Katie" reveals themselves; Marley initially takes the blame, but Unique confesses to Ryder that she is actually "Katie", having created a false identity to get closer to him. Blaine remains determined to propose to Kurt. After being dubbed a mathematical genius at MIT, Brittany returns to McKinley with a new arrogant attitude; she refuses to perform and breaks up with Sam, who gets Santana to return to Lima and intervene. After talking with Santana, Brittany reveals that she has been offered early admission at MIT and emotionally says goodbye to the glee club, as she will be leaving after Regionals. New Directions ultimately win Regionals, and they return to the choir room, where Emma arrives with an officiant to announce that she and Will are getting married immediately. As the New Directions celebrate Will and Emma's marriage, Blaine holds a jewelry box behind his back.

== Cast ==
Glee season 4 main cast

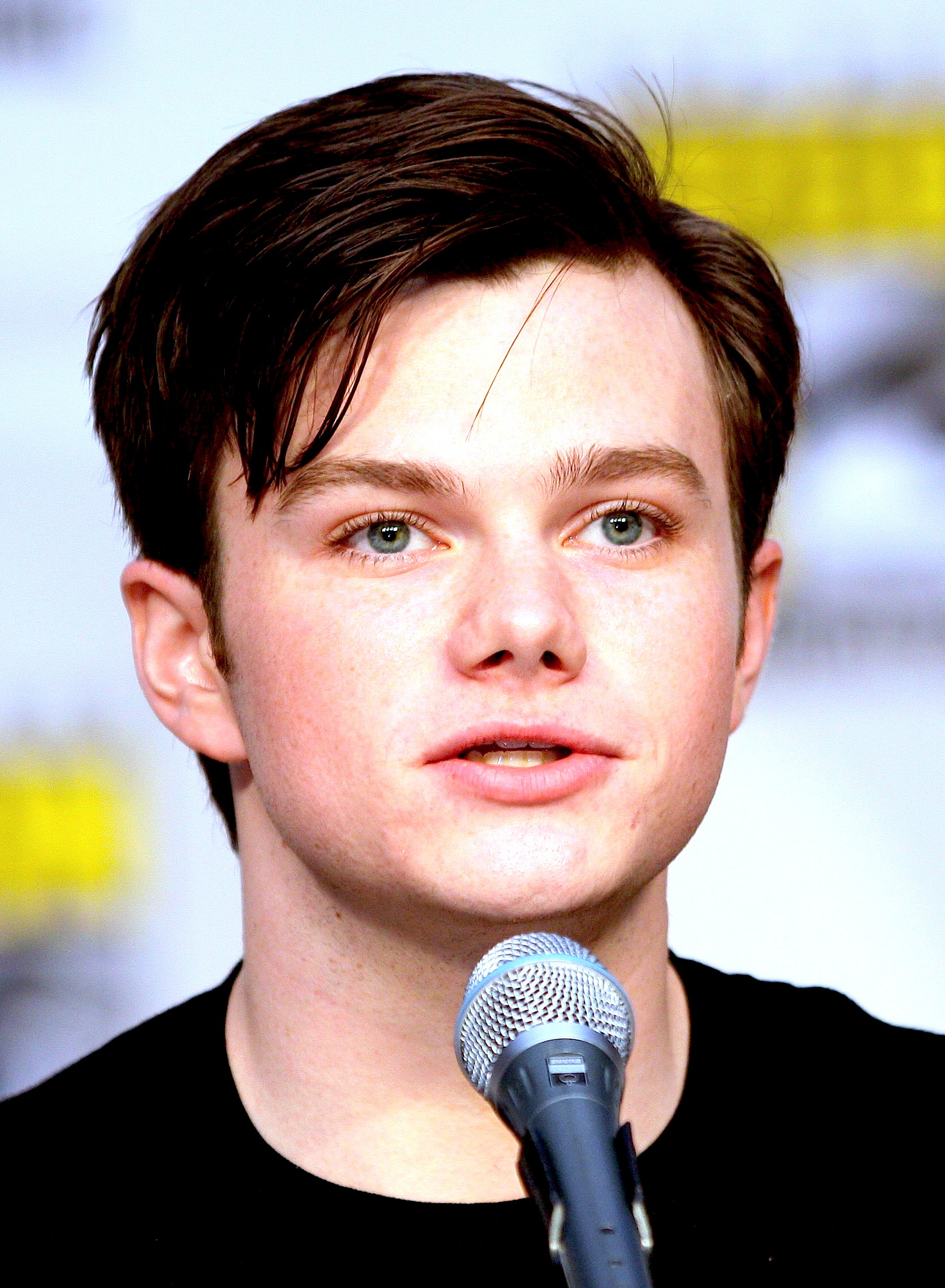
Chris Colfer

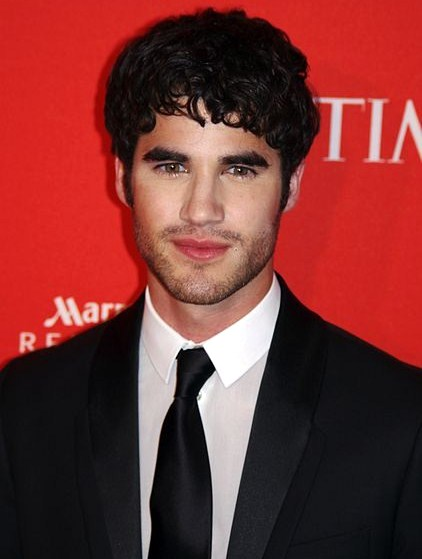
Darren Criss

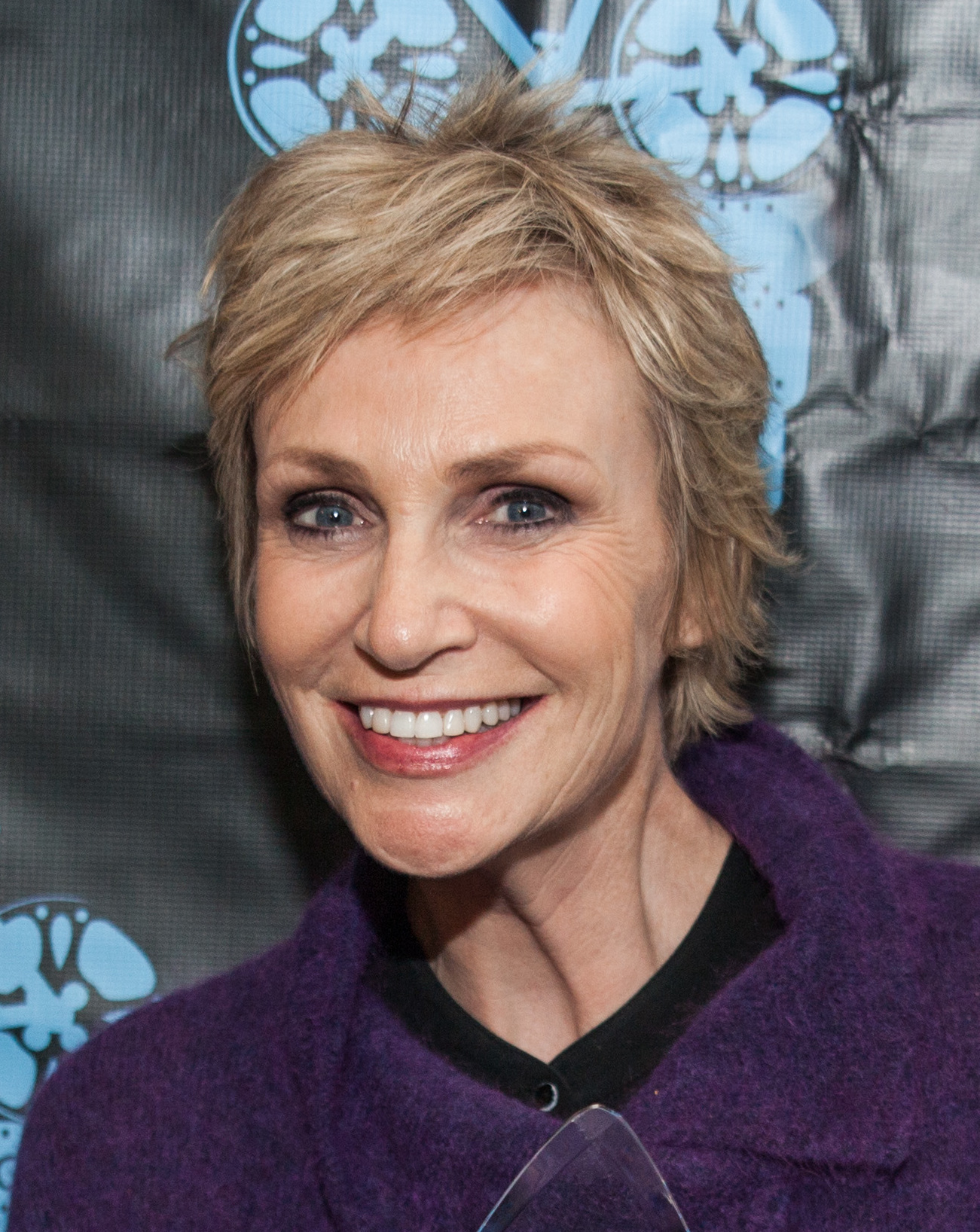
Jane Lynch

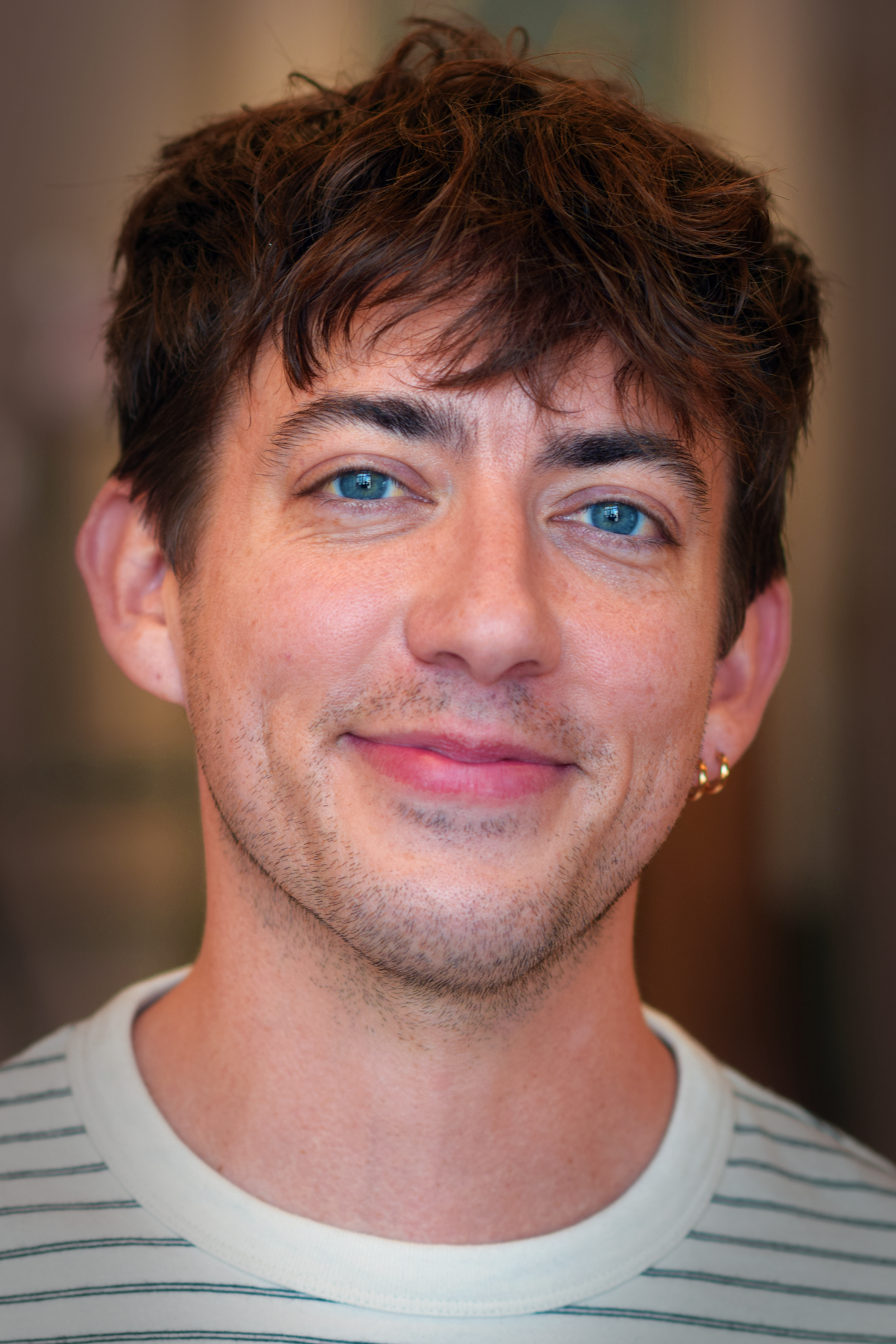
Kevin McHale

Lea Michele

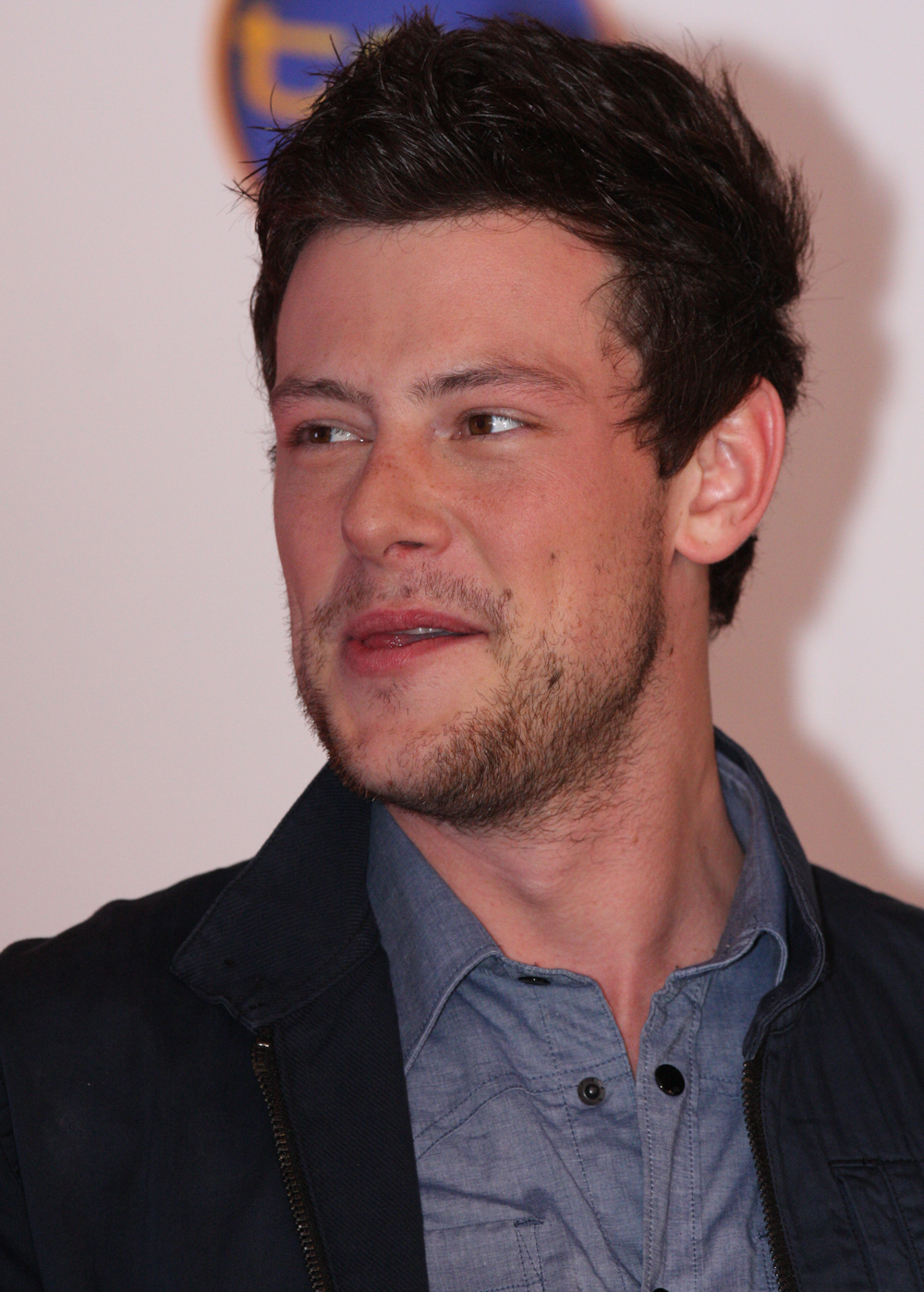
Cory Monteith

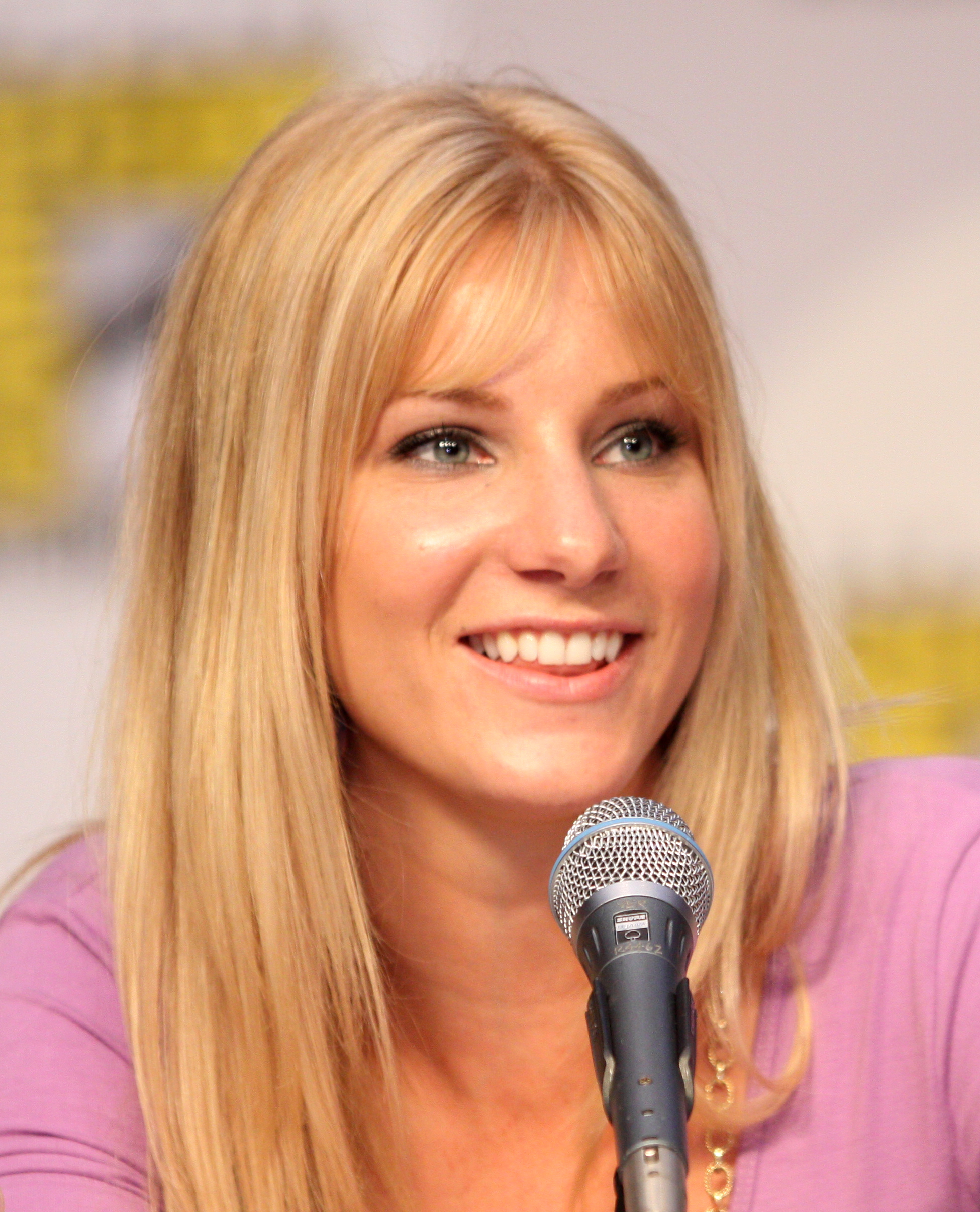
Heather Morris

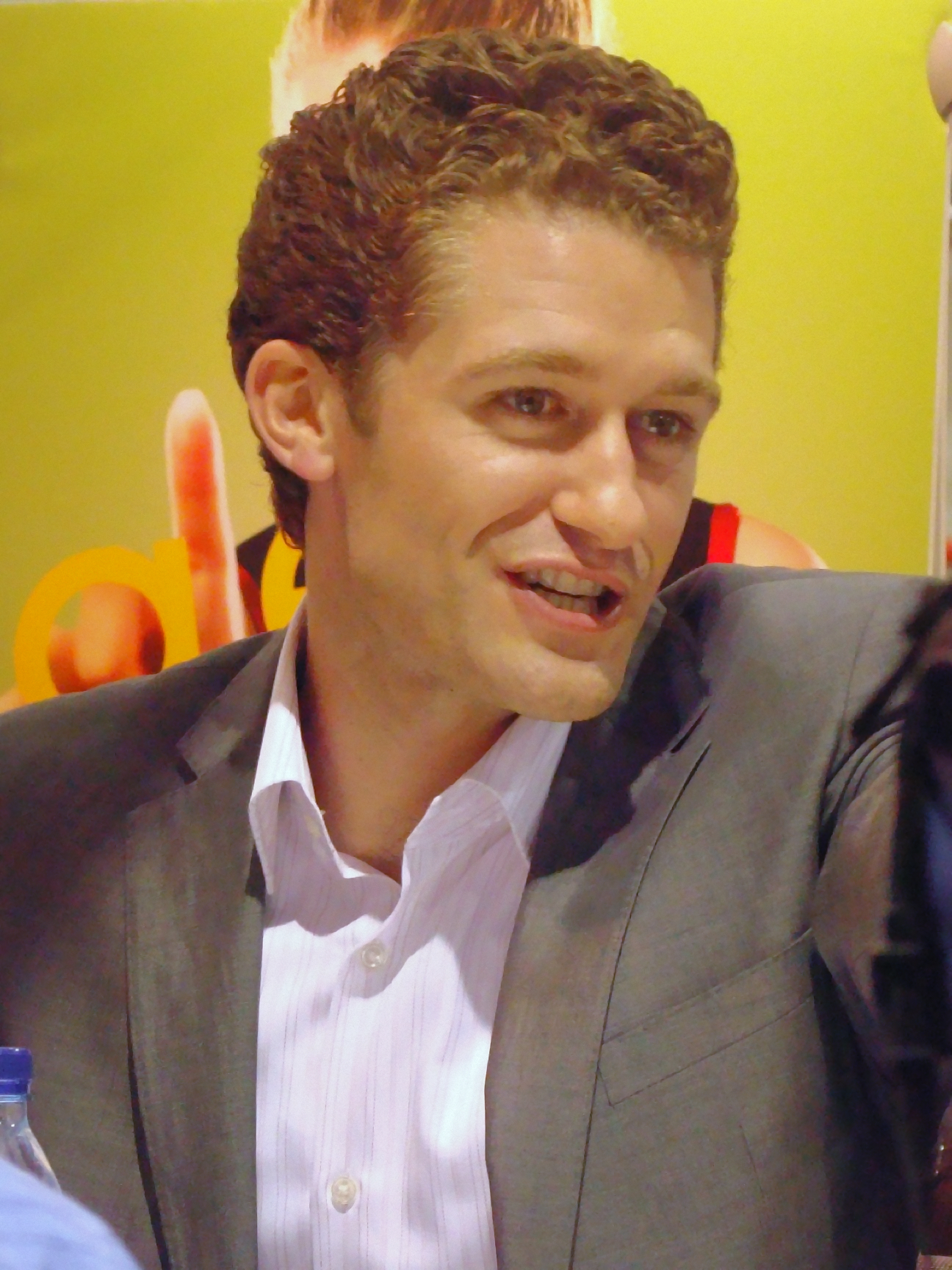
Matthew Morrison

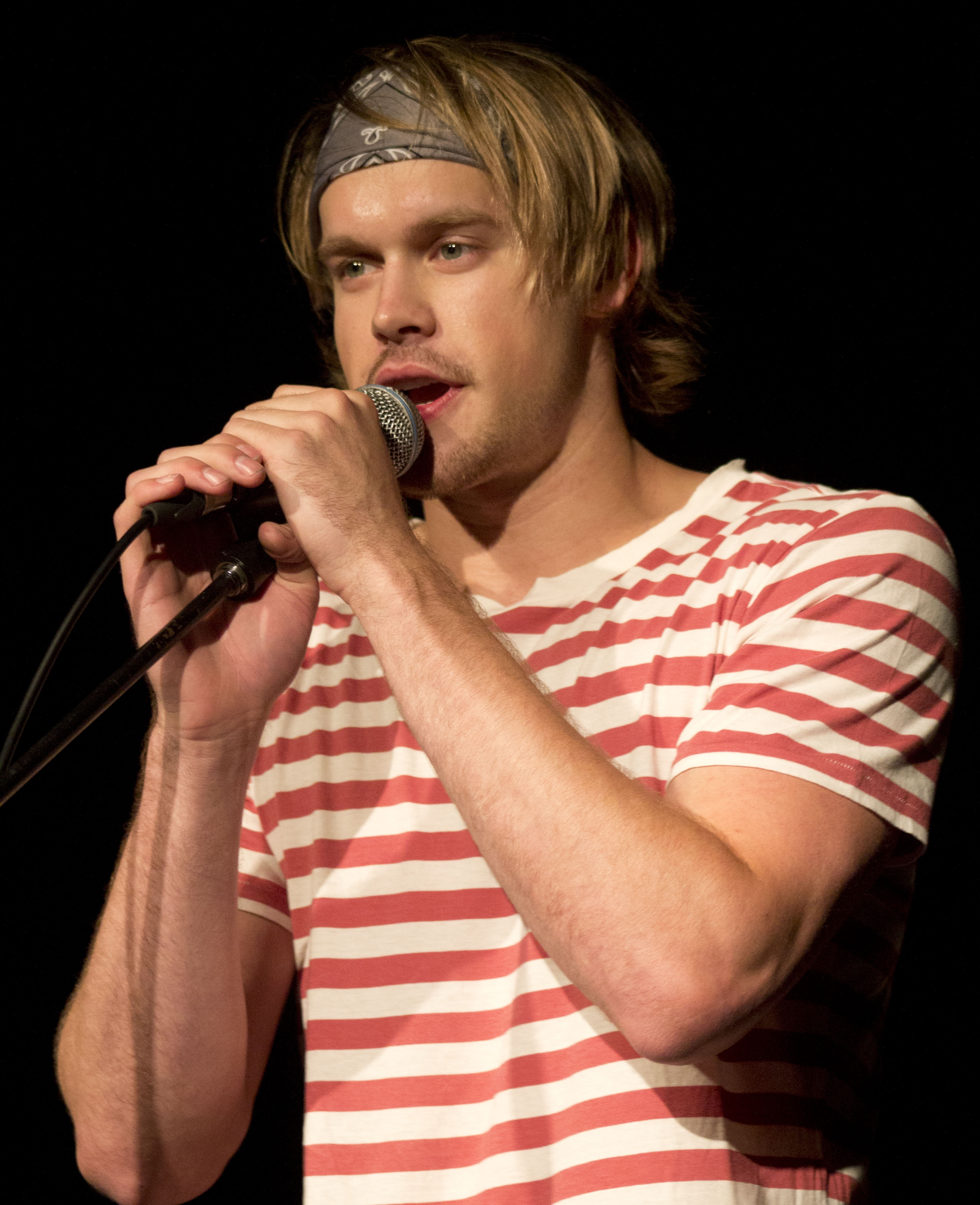
Chord Overstreet

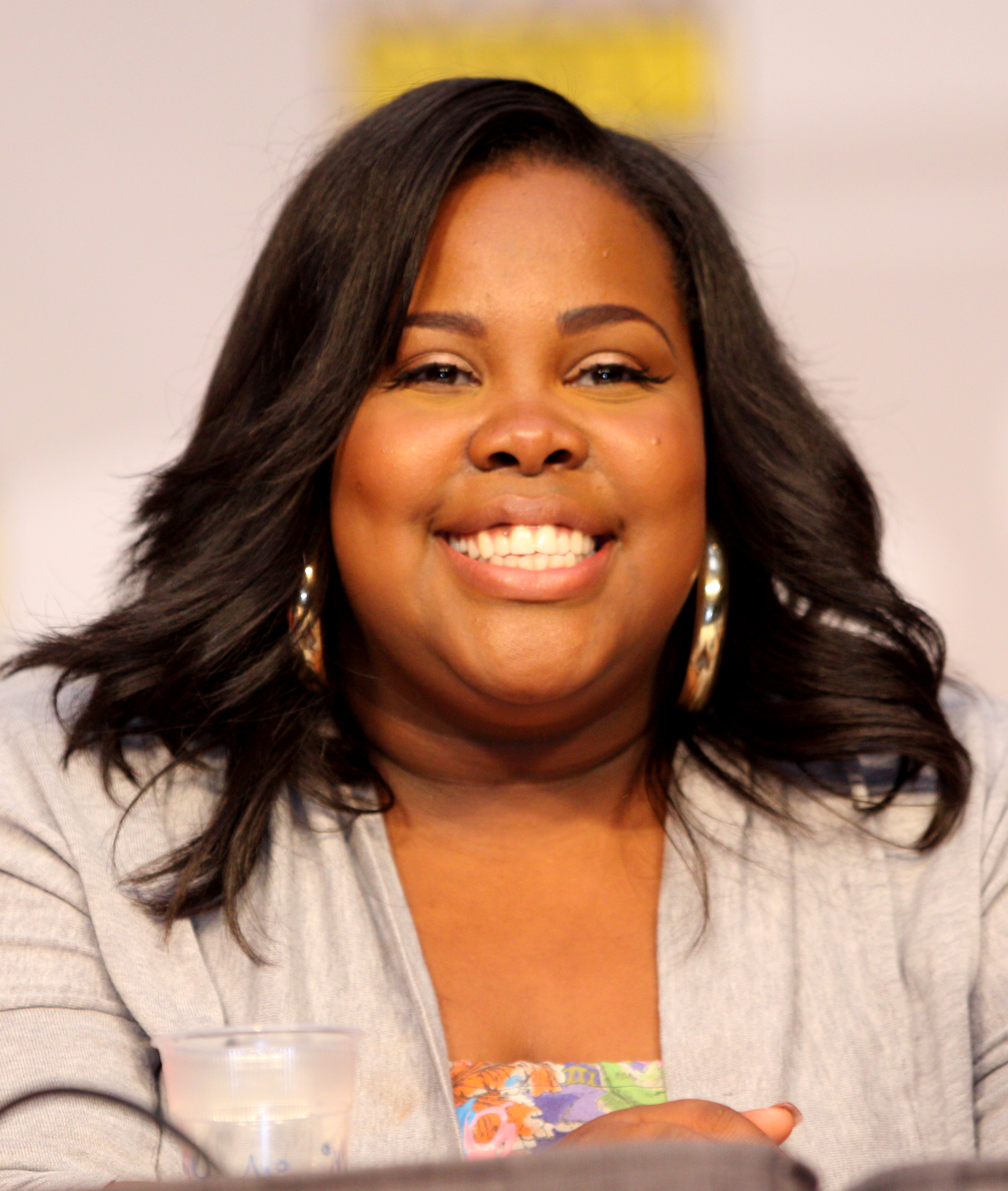
Amber Riley

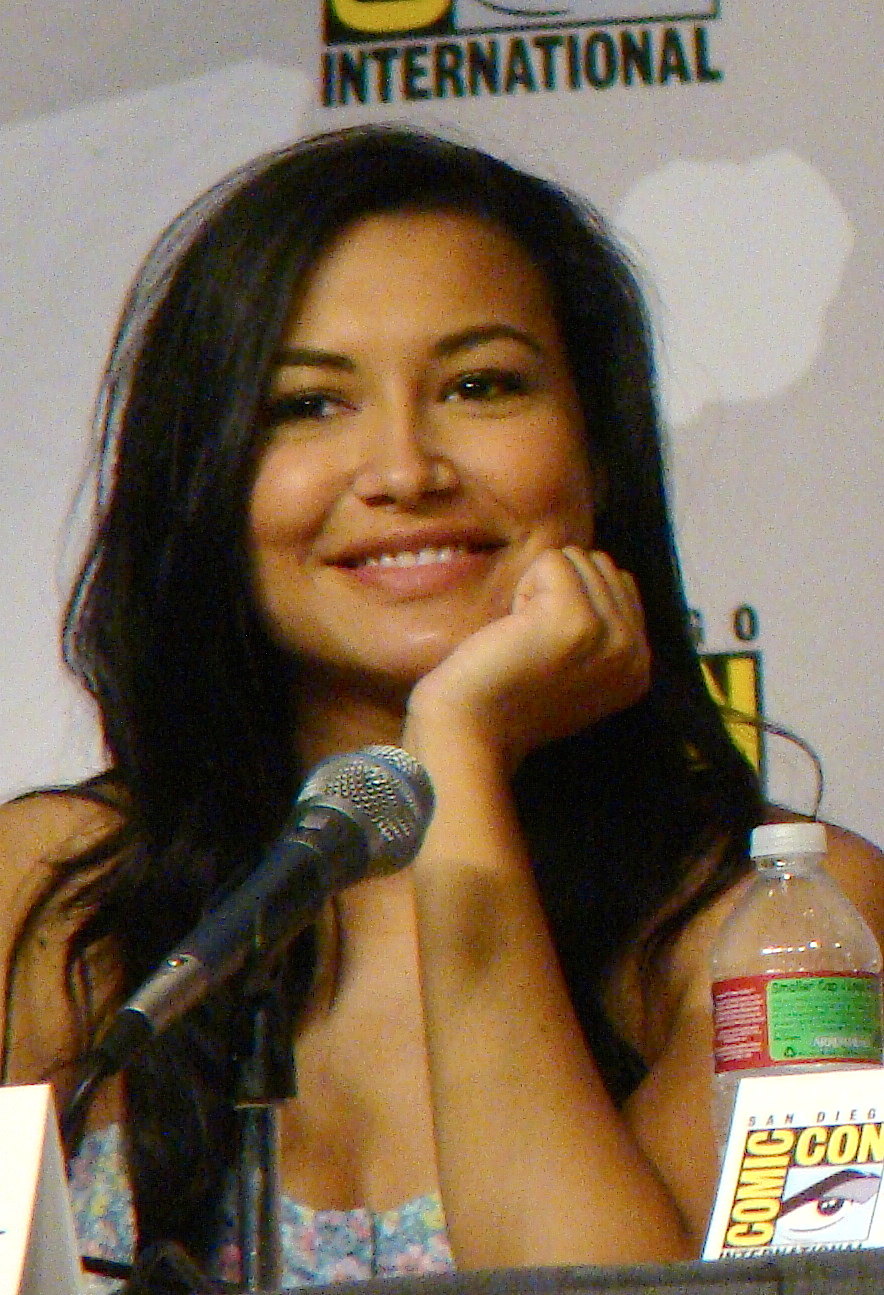
Naya Rivera

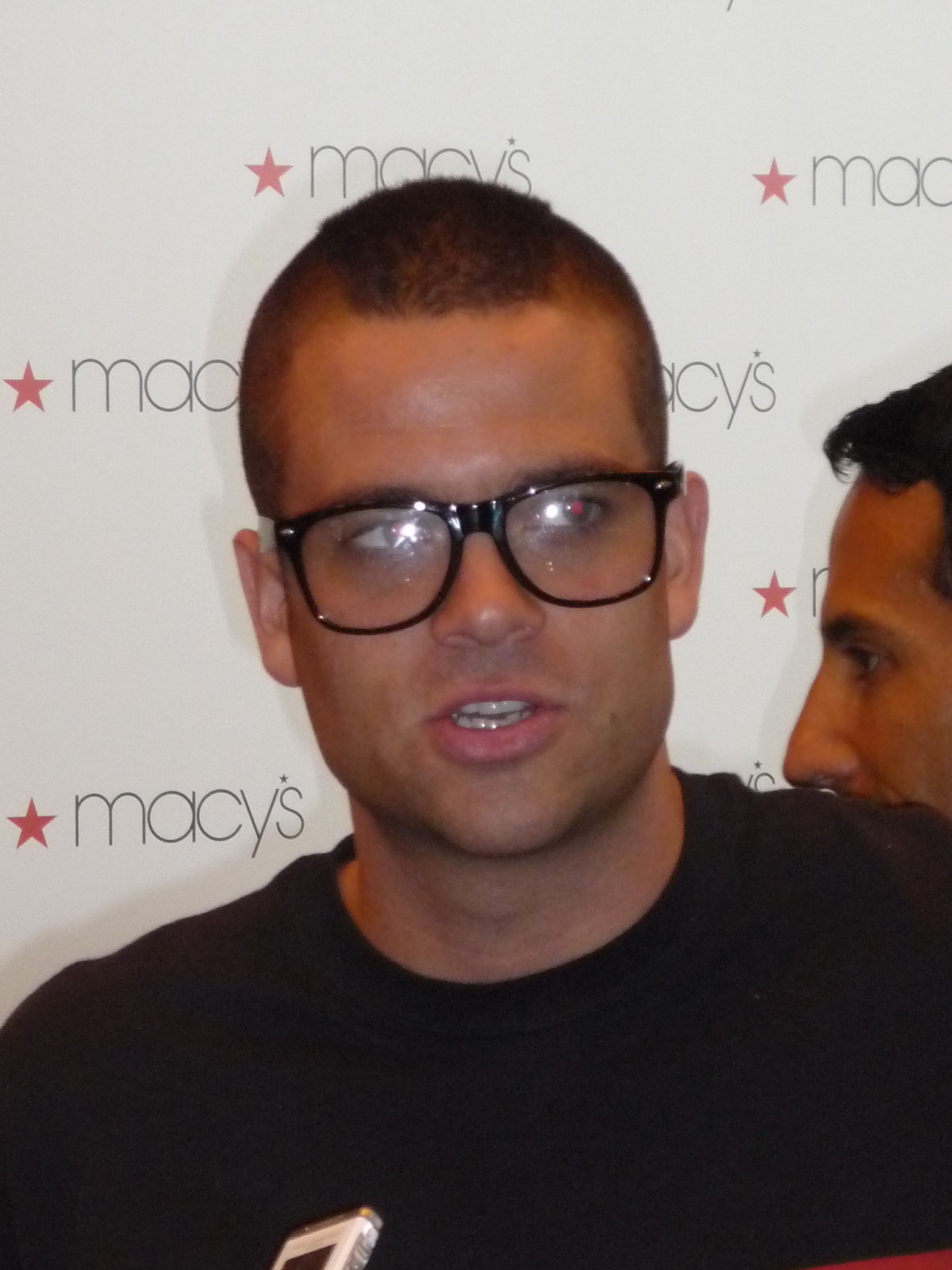
Mark Salling

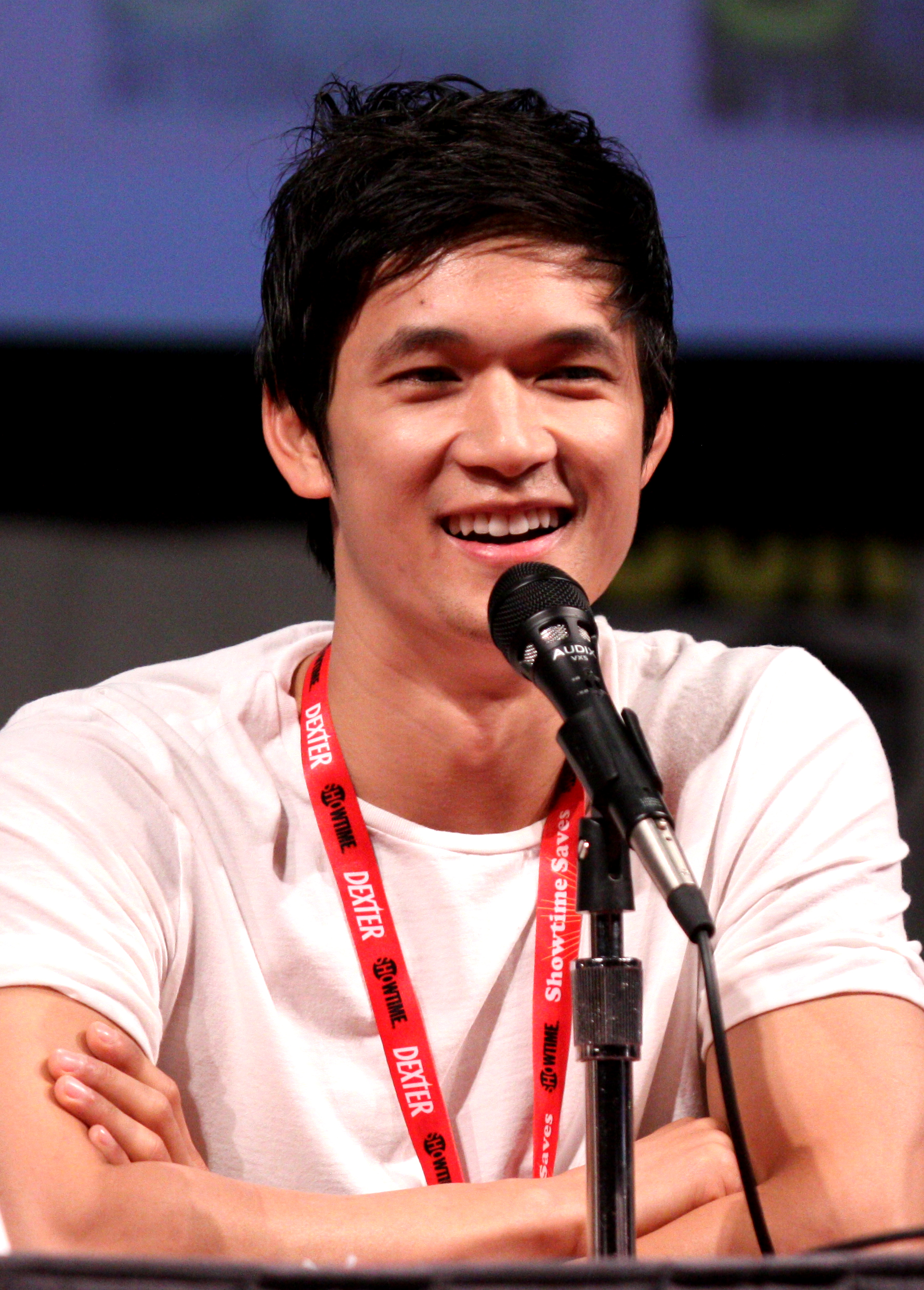
Harry Shum, Jr.

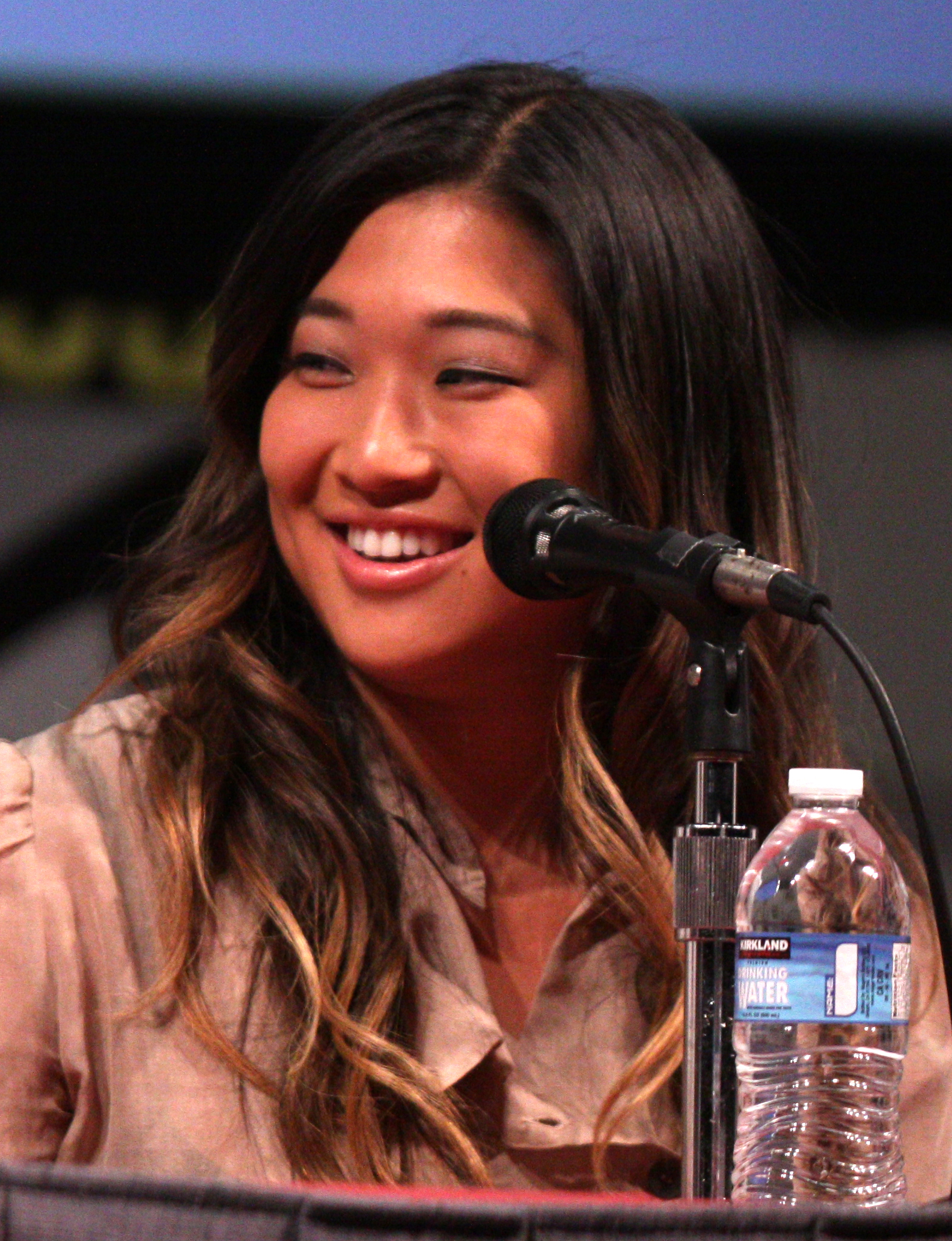
Jenna Ushkowitz

Fox credits fourteen main cast members for the season: Matthew Morrison as Glee Club director Will Schuester; Jane Lynch as cheerleading coach Sue Sylvester; Chris Colfer, Lea Michele, Cory Monteith, Amber Riley, Naya Rivera, Mark Salling and Harry Shum Jr. as McKinley graduates and former glee club members Kurt Hummel, Rachel Berry, Finn Hudson, Mercedes Jones, Santana Lopez, Noah "Puck" Puckerman and Mike Chang respectively; and Darren Criss, Kevin McHale, Heather Morris, Chord Overstreet and Jenna Ushkowitz as current glee club members Blaine Anderson, Artie Abrams, Brittany Pierce, Sam Evans, and Tina Cohen-Chang respectively. Overstreet received a contractual upgrade, having formerly been a recurring cast member. Two previous main cast members who are no longer series regulars are Jayma Mays as guidance counselor Emma Pillsbury, and Dianna Agron as Quinn Fabray, though both are listed among the guest cast for this season.

Two actresses appeared in multi-episode guest-starring arcs as part of the New York sequences: Sarah Jessica Parker as Isabelle Wright (first reported as Isabelle Klempt), and Kate Hudson as Cassandra July. Parker's character is a mentor to Kurt, and Hudson's character is Rachel's dance teacher at NYADA; Hudson was originally reported to be appearing in six episodes during the fall.

Several new recurring characters were added for the new season. Dean Geyer as Brody Weston, a handsome junior at Rachel's new school, Jacob Artist as McKinley sophomore Jake Puckerman, Puck's (Mark Salling) younger half brother, Becca Tobin as Kitty, a cheerleader, and Melissa Benoist as Marley Rose. Marley's mother Millie was played by Trisha Rae Stahl.

The Glee Project winner Blake Jenner was awarded a recurring role, initially set for at least seven episodes, starting with the fifth episode; he plays Ryder Lynn, a new McKinley student, who joins New Directions with Finn's aid. Jenner has commented that he would enjoy playing a character like Finn. Glee Project runner-up Ali Stroker had a guest role on "I Do" as Betty, Emma's niece and Artie's love interest.

Actress Whoopi Goldberg reprised her Season 3 role, Carmen Tibideaux, Dean of Vocal Performance and Song Interpretation at NYADA. She recurred throughout the season. Other recurring guests who returned include Vanessa Lengies as Sugar Motta, Samuel Larsen as Joe Hart and Alex Newell as Wade "Unique" Adams. Lauren Potter as cheerleader Becky Jackson also returned, and filmed scenes on August 22, 2012. Damian McGinty (Rory Flanagan) was not a part of the regular cast, but he made a special appearance in "Glee, Actually" as Artie's guardian angel in a dream sequence. From the cast of recurring adult characters, Dot-Marie Jones as Coach Beiste, Iqbal Theba as Principal Figgins and NeNe Leakes as Coach Roz Washington all returned. Jessalyn Gilsig, like McGinty, made a special appearance in "Glee, Actually" in Artie's dream sequence, reprising her role as Terri Schuester. Grant Gustin returned as Dalton Academy Warbler Sebastian Smythe, and the group's new leader, Hunter, was played by Nolan Gerard Funk. Ashley Fink also returned for a guest appearance in "Sadie Hawkins" reprising her role as Lauren Zizes after being absent for most of Season 3 and the first ten episodes of Season 4. American Idol season 11 runner-up Jessica Sanchez appeared near the end of the season as a student from a rival school named Frida Romero, who has been described as a "powerhouse singer". Idina Menzel also reprised her role as Shelby Corcoran for a guest appearance in "Sweet Dreams" for the first time since her multi-episode arc in Season 3.

== Reception ==
=== Critical response ===
The review aggregator website Rotten Tomatoes gives the season a 65% with an average rating of 7.07/10, based on 23 reviews. The site's critics consensus reads, "Glee may have lost a few of its major characters, but several strong storylines help to compensate, and the songs are as strong as ever."

On Metacritic it received a score of 73 out of 100 based on 6 reviews, indicating "generally favorable" reviews.

=== Ratings ===
As of April 19, 2013, after 19 of 22 episodes in the season, the season had averaged a 3.6/10 rating/share among adults 18-49 and 8.70 million viewers when counting live plus 7 Day (DVR) Ratings.

==== Live + SD Ratings ====
Viewership and ratings per episode of Glee season 4
No.	Title	Air date	Rating/share (18–49)	Viewers (millions)
1	"The New Rachel"	September 13, 2012	3.1/8	7.41
2	"Britney 2.0"	September 20, 2012	2.9/8	7.46
3	"Makeover"	September 27, 2012	2.4/7	5.79
4	"The Break Up"	October 4, 2012	2.6/7	6.07
5	"The Role You Were Born to Play"	November 8, 2012	2.4/6	5.68
6	"Glease"	November 15, 2012	2.1/6	5.22
7	"Dynamic Duets"	November 22, 2012	1.5/5	4.62
8	"Thanksgiving"	November 29, 2012	2.2/6	5.39
9	"Swan Song"	December 6, 2012	2.2/6	5.43
10	"Glee, Actually"	December 13, 2012	2.0/5	5.26
11	"Sadie Hawkins"	January 24, 2013	2.6/7	6.79
12	"Naked"	January 31, 2013	2.1/6	5.48
13	"Diva"	February 7, 2013	2.2/6	6.03
14	"I Do"	February 14, 2013	1.7/5	5.13
15	"Girls (and Boys) On Film"	March 7, 2013	2.4/7	6.72
16	"Feud"	March 14, 2013	2.0/6	5.37
17	"Guilty Pleasures"	March 21, 2013	2.0/6	5.91
18	"Shooting Star"	April 11, 2013	2.4/6	6.67
19	"Sweet Dreams"	April 18, 2013	2.1/6	6.14
20	"Lights Out"	April 25, 2013	1.8/5	5.24
21	"Wonder-ful"	May 2, 2013	1.9/5	5.19
22	"All or Nothing"	May 9, 2013	2.0/6	5.92

== Home video releases ==
Glee: The Complete Fourth Season was released on October 1, 2013, in DVD (with 6-set discs) and Blu-ray (with 4-set discs), and contains the special features; "Glee Music Jukebox", "Movin' On Up: Glee in NYC", "Deleted Scenes", "Jarley", "Building New York", "Glee on Film", "The Road to 500", "Blaine's Time Capsule" and "Glee Premiere Party!". After Cory Monteith's death on July 13, 2013, they decided to re-design the Season 4 DVD cover art to include an image of Finn. However, this change has altered the release date.

Glee – The Complete Fourth Season
Set details	Special features	
22 episodes; 6-disc set; Running Time: 965 minutes; 1.77:1 aspect ratio; English; Subtitles: English, French, Spanish	Glee Music Jukebox; Deleted Scenes; Movin' On Up: Glee in NYC; Jarley; Building New York; Glee on Film; The Road to 500; Blaine's Time Capsule; Glee Premiere Party!	
DVD release dates
Region 1	Region 2	Region 4
October 1, 2013	October 7, 2013	October 16, 2013
