= You Have More Friends Than You Know =

Song by Jeff Marx

from the album You Have More Friends Than You Know
- Released: April 15, 2013
- Recorded: April 12, 2013; Los Angeles, California
- Genre: Musical theatre
- Length: 4:42
- Label: Fantasies Come True
- Songwriters: Jeff Marx and Mervyn Warren

"You Have More Friends Than You Know", by Jeff Marx and Mervyn Warren, was commissioned by Hancher Auditorium at the University of Iowa for It Gets Better, a touring stage production which premiered at the University of Iowa in 2013.

Marx recorded the song and released the single online along with an instrumental version, with a portion of the proceeds to benefit The Trevor Project. A variety of other versions are featured on the song's website, where others touched by the song are encouraged to record their own version to spread its message.

The television show Glee featured a cover of the song in its April 18, 2013, episode and sung by Darren Criss, Melissa Benoist, Alex Newell and Chord Overstreet. However, in Glee, it is portrayed as an “original song” written by Benoist’s character Marley Rose.
