= Ryder Lynn =

Fictional character from the Fox series Glee

- Glee character
- Blake Jenner as Ryder Lynn in Glee
- First appearance: "The Role You Were Born to Play" (2012)
- Last appearance: "Dreams Come True" (2015)
- Created by: Ryan Murphy; Brad Falchuk; Ian Brennan
- Portrayed by: Blake Jenner

In-universe information
- Occupation: High school student

Ryder Lynn is a fictional character from the Fox musical comedy-drama series Glee. The character is portrayed by actor Blake Jenner, and appeared in Glee from the fifth episode of the fourth season, "The Role You Were Born to Play", first broadcast on November 8, 2012 up until the thirteenth episode of season five ("New Directions"). Ryder is a transfer student to McKinley High who arrives as a sophomore, is on the football team, has trouble with his grades, and is recruited by Finn Hudson (Cory Monteith) to try out for the school musical, and later to join the glee club, New Directions.

The character was created when Jenner won a seven-episode arc in Glee's fourth season after having successfully competed in the second season of the reality television show The Glee Project. As Ryder, Jenner has sung several solo covers on the show, and appeared in many group performances. Jenner appeared as a recurring guest star beyond his seven-episode prize, and he has been promoted to the main cast effective with the start of the show's fifth season, but was written out mid season. He guest starred in the series finale briefly, during the last musical number of the series.

== Storylines ==
=== Season 4 ===
Ryder Lynn (Blake Jenner), a new transfer student to McKinley High as a sophomore, is on the football team and is not getting good grades. He is approached by Finn Hudson (Cory Monteith), who was the team's quarterback before he graduated the previous year, and is co-directing the school musical, Grease. Finn urges Ryder to try out for Grease, telling him that it was Finn's participation in the school's glee club that helped him bring up his grades. Although initially dubious, a bad test grade makes Ryder decide to audition. He meets potential co-star Marley Rose (Melissa Benoist). They both got called back and compete for the lead roles, Danny and Sandy, with Jake Puckerman (Jacob Artist), who has a mutual attraction to Marley, and Jake's ex-girlfriend Kitty Wilde (Becca Tobin). He is ultimately chosen as Danny, alongside Marley as Sandy. Ryder is attracted to Marley. Marley and Jake are members of the New Directions glee club, and when Ryder joins it after the musical is over, he and Jake become rivals and get into fights over Marley, before eventually coming to understand each other and become friends. Ryder's difficulties with schoolwork are diagnosed as dyslexia, and he begins to get help.

When New Directions loses to the Dalton Academy Warblers at Sectionals, it is on the verge of disbanding, but Finn, who has temporarily taken over as director, pulls it back together, and the glee club becomes eligible for Regionals when drug abuse retroactively disqualifies the Warblers. Jake and Marley are dating, and Ryder gives Jake good advice about how to handle his romance, but it turns out that although he helps Jake make Valentine's Day a great success, this is because Ryder has been noticing Marley's likes while falling in love with her himself; he ultimately kisses her, which strains his friendship with them both. The situation is exacerbated when a good friend of Marley's, fellow club member Wade "Unique" Adams (Alex Newell), tells Ryder to stay away from Marley. Unique is a transgender female student who is forced much of the time to dress as a male, and Ryder insists on calling her a "dude" because that is what Unique was born as. He is eventually convinced by an online chat friend, Katie Fitzgerald, that Unique's reality is that she is a female inside, and apologizes to her and to Jake and Marley as well.

Ryder and Katie develop a close online bond, telling each other their innermost secrets, and he pushes her to meet him in person, though she demurs. When he sees her in the hall at McKinley and realizes she is a student there, he arranges to serenade her with Elton John's "Your Song". She is flattered, but completely puzzled as to why he would do so: it turns out that her name is Marissa, not Katie, and someone else has used pictures of Marissa as the images for Katie's online accounts. Later, at glee club practice, two gunshots are heard in the school—the classroom is barricaded and everyone takes cover. Ryder, even though hurt by Katie's deception, decides to call her cell phone—he feels that close to her still—and a phone starts ringing in across the room, in one of the backpacks. When he finally hangs up, the ringing stops. Eventually, the all clear is given.

Ryder fails to convince Katie to meet him, and Jake points out that it is strange for Ryder to be revealing things to an online person that he has not told his own friends. Ryder later sings "Everybody Hurts", and tells the glee club that he was molested by his babysitter when he was eleven years old. Two of the guys in the club, Sam and Artie, fail to understand why this was a traumatic thing, but Kitty does, and later tells Ryder that she herself had been molested. Kitty later asks Ryder out for an impromptu snack, but he is in the middle of a conversation with Katie, and asks her if they could try some other time. She is hurt by his refusal, and declines.

In the week before Regionals, Ryder announces that he will not participate in the competition unless the glee club member who is masquerading as Katie reveals her or himself. His withdrawal would deprive the club of the twelfth member it needs to compete. In a tense moment, Marley confesses to being Katie, but it later turns out that she was covering for Unique, who finally admits to Ryder that she had initially posed as Katie because she liked him, but knew he would not accept her given the way she actually looks; she balked at revealing herself because she did not want to lose the relationship they had. Ryder tells her that he will never speak to her again, and announces in glee club that although he will compete at Regionals, afterward he would be quitting immediately; New Directions goes on to win Regionals.

=== Season 5 ===
Ryder is promoted to the main cast in this season. After Regionals, Ryder is still participating in the glee club. Apart from a small mention by Kitty, there's no resolution to his cliffhanger storyline with Unique, as he seems to be fine around Unique and does not show any hard feelings during the screentime. Over time, it is evident that Ryder still has feelings for Marley, especially in the episode "Movin' Out": after she has broken up with Jake for cheating, she is serenaded by Ryder with the song "An Innocent Man". The two go on a date, and Ryder is excited at the prospect of the two dating. However, Marley claims that just because they went on a date, doesn't mean they are a couple, effectively ending any romantic relations between the two. When New Directions goes to Los Angeles to compete in Nationals, he discovers that Marley is giving up on songwriting and plans to quit the glee club after Nationals. He reaffirms his friendship with Jake despite all the rivalry and together they give New Direction successful alumna and friend Mercedes Jones (Amber Riley) copies of Marley's songs as a means to convince her not to give up on her dreams. The New Directions come in second. He last appear in the season when principal Sue Sylvester officially disbands the glee club because they did not win and share one last group hug with Marley, Jake, Unique, and Kitty before attending his upperclassmen graduation.

=== Season 6 ===
He is transferred to another school after the glee club is disbanded. His whereabouts during the season remain unknown. In “The Hurt Locker, Part Two”, he is mentioned by Rachel as “Raider” – still cannot remember his name properly after she mentioned him as “Rick” in the 100th episode – only to be corrected by Kurt. In the same episode, Kitty mentions that all the old members stopped talking to her once they got transferred. He briefly returns in the closing minutes of the series finale "Dreams Come True" for one last performance and takes a bow with the rest of the Glee Cast.

== Development ==
Jenner was the sole winner of the second season of the reality television competition The Glee Project in 2012, which earned him a seven-episode arc on the fourth season of Glee. The prize was awarded by Ryan Murphy, who had the final decision on who was eliminated after each episode and who the eventual winner would be. Glee casting director Robert Ulrich, who was one of the mentors and judges of the competition, cited Jenner's versatility and skill as an actor, and noted that with the character of Finn having graduated at the end of the show's third season, Murphy, Glee's showrunner, said they needed a new "anchor in the choir room". He quoted Murphy as having said many times during the competition—though it never appeared on screen in a Glee Project episode—"Robert, the most difficult person to cast for Glee is the jock. Because to find a masculine, good-looking guy who can sing and act is so tough."

Jenner continued appearing as a recurring guest star for the remainder of the fourth season beyond the seven episodes he had won. Jenner as Ryder has been promoted to the main cast as of the beginning of Glee's fifth season.

== Musical performances ==
In his first Glee episode, "The Role You Were Born to Play", Ryder performed Foreigner's "Juke Box Hero" with Finn, in what turned out to be an audition for Grease. Entertainment Weekly's Erin Strecker gave the performance a "B" grade, and added, "Nice debut, Blake Jenner."

In the following episode, having been cast as the musical's lead, Danny Zuko, he sang lead in "Greased Lightnin'", and co-lead in parts of "You're the One That I Want". In the former number, Sandra Gonzalez of Entertainment Weekly called Ryder "very promising" and added that the number made her "really hopeful about New Direction's future" if the character stayed in the group; she gave it a "B+" grade; Mike Slezak of TVLine was more generous, giving it an "A".

Samantha Highfill of Entertainment Weekly gave a "B+" grade to Ryder's rendition of "Everybody Hurts" in the "Lights Out" episode, and wrote, "This song was the perfect example of why Ryder needs to sing, like, all the time." Slezak also gave the number a "B+". Ryder was heard in vocals on three other songs in that episode: Highfill thought "You've Lost That Lovin' Feelin'", for which he supplied the harmony line, was "a little underwhelming" and gave it a "B−"; "The Longest Time" received an "A−"; and she complimented the "strong male vocalists" in "We Will Rock You", to which she gave an "A" grade.

== Reception ==
In Ryder's second episode, "Glease", Sandra Gonzalez of Entertainment Weekly was unenthusiastic about the bulimia storyline involving Marley, but noted that it did serve for the audience to get to know Ryder better, and that "so far, I'm liking everything about him." Slezak called Ryder "undeniable leading man material" in his review of the episode, though he was also unhappy with the bulimia sequence.

The A.V. Club's Brandon Nowalk expressed dissatisfaction with the timing of Ryder's advent: "it seems like a problem to introduce Ryder Lynn one week, cast him as Danny Zuko the next, and ask us to care about some romantic entanglement of his while all the established plots fight for attention".

Ryder's scene with Finn in Dynamic Duets right after he learns he is dyslexic was praised by Strecker, who wrote that Jenner "did a great job", and by Slezak, who called it "a sweet, genuinely emotional scene". Rae Votta of Billboard magazine praised the entire dyslexia storyline: "What's great about this is it's Glee focusing on a story that isn't about a relationship at its core, it's about a boy and his own struggles … It's one of the most worthwhile and interesting things Glee has done".

In her review of the "Lights Out" episode near the end of the fourth season, Votta wrote of Ryder's telling the glee club that he had been molested when he was eleven years old: "Ryder's reveals have been the most interesting of the season, and this one is no disappointment."
