= Trisha Rae Stahl =

American actress (born 1973)

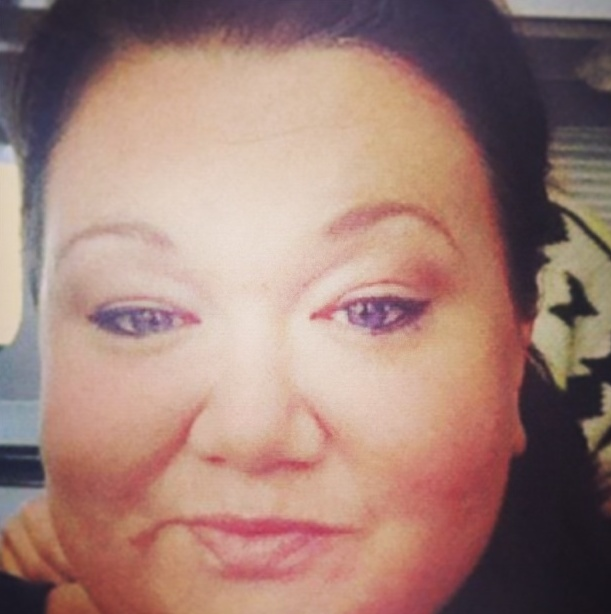
- Stahl in 2013
- Born: Trisha Rae Stahl; August 10, 1973 (age 52)
- Education: Indiana University of Pennsylvania
- Occupation: Actress
- Years active: 2008–2018

Trisha Rae Stahl (born August 10, 1973) is an American actress.

== Personal life ==
Stahl is from Williamsport, Pennsylvania. She holds a degree in theatrical performance from Indiana University of Pennsylvania and a Master of Arts in teaching special education.

== Career ==
Her feature films include Trailer Park of Terror and Kiss the Abyss. Ms. Stahl has also had roles on television (ER, "Punk'd") and on webisodes (The Romantic Foibles of Esteban). Stahl joined the cast of Glee with a recurring guest star role for its fourth season, starting in September 2012. Trisha Stahl has also worked as a commercial actress.

== Filmography ==
Film
| Year | Title | Role | Notes |
|---|---|---|---|
| 2008 | Trailer Park of Terror | Larlene | Direct-to-video film |
| 2008 | Life at the Trailer Park of Terror | Larlene | Short film |
| 2010 | Kiss the Abyss | Ethel | Film debut |
| 2013 | Single and Ready to Mingle | Holly Sensari | Short film |
| 2013 | Boulevard H | Kathy | post-production |
| 2017 | Walk of Fame | Kathy | |
Television
| Year | Title | Role | Notes |
| 2008 | ER | Bertha | Episode: "Under Pressure" |
| 2009 | Sekai Gyoten News | Amy | Documentary |
| 2009 | The Romantic Foibles of Esteban | Bull Dyke | Webisode: "The Dinner Party" |
| 2011 | Svetlana | Cellmate | Episode: "Narnia" |
| 2012 | Punk'd | Herself | Episode: "Nick Cannon" |
| 2012–2013 | Glee | Millie Rose | Recurring role |
| 2014 | Criminal Minds | Michelle Fader | Episode: "Gabby" |
| 2016–2017 | Too Close to Home | Jolene Hayes | Series Regular |
| 2017 | How to Get Away with Murder | New Prisoner | Episode: "Go Cry Somwhere Else" |
