= Marley Rose =

Fictional character from the Fox series Glee

- Glee character
- Melissa Benoist as Marley Rose in Glee
- First appearance: "The New Rachel" (2012)
- Last appearance: "New Directions" (2014)
- Created by: Ryan Murphy; Brad Falchuk; Ian Brennan
- Portrayed by: Melissa Benoist

In-universe information
- Occupation: High school student
- Family: Millie Rose (mother)
- Significant others: Jake Puckerman (former); Ryder Lynn (former)

Marley Rose is a fictional character from the Fox musical comedy-drama series Glee. The character is portrayed by actress Melissa Benoist, and appeared in Glee since the premiere of the fourth season, "The New Rachel" first broadcast on September 13, 2012, up until the thirteenth episode of season five ("New Directions"). Marley is a shy, unambitious wallflower who is the daughter of McKinley High's cafeteria lady, and aspires to be a singer on radio rather than on Broadway.

The character was created by Ryan Murphy as a means to create a character that had the talent of Rachel Berry but a different personality and aspirations. Benoist auditioned for the role and immediately got the part, after impressing Murphy. While Benoist was praised for her performance, the character has received mixed to positive reviews from critics and fans alike with some critics praising Marley for her original storyline contrasting sharply to that of Rachel Berry's while others found her storylines to be lackluster.

== Storylines ==
=== Season 4 ===
Marley is introduced as the shy wallflower with a hidden passion for singing, the daughter of cafeteria lady Millie Rose. Following auditions for Glee club, she impresses Will Schuester, the seniors, and Unique with her rendition of "New York State of Mind" by Billy Joel (which Rachel Berry coincidentally happened to be singing for her NYADA audition). During her time at Glee club, Marley grows attracted to Jake Puckerman, the younger brother of Noah Puckerman and forms a close friendship with Wade "Unique" Adams. However, when Marley discovers that Jake is dating Kitty Wilde, a cheerleader that bullied her and said awful things about her mother's obesity, she is devastated. When Jake and Kitty break up, it is around the time that Finn announces a musical performance of Grease, which undergoes budget cuts leading to difficulties in funding. When auditioning, Marley meets Ryder Lynn, a football player and transfer student whom she grows briefly attracted to. Marley and Unique ignore Sue Sylvester deriding them, telling Unique she is not a girl, and the two impress Mercedes Jones, Finn Hudson, Artie Abrams, and Mike Chang with their rendition of "Blow Me (One Last Kiss)". Marley gets the role of Sandy and Unique gets Rizzo but is forced to surrender the part to Santana Lopez after Sue exploits bullying from her peers to her parents.

During rehearsals, Kitty tries to undermine Marley's confidence by making her skip lunches and tampering with her costume to make her believe that she is getting fat like her mother. After the musical, which Rachel leaves New York to attend to show support for Finn, Marley develops bulimia and skips lunches after losing confidence in her body. During sectionals, in a rendition of "Gangnam Style", Marley passes out. When Santana blames Kitty for undermining Marley's confidence, the rest of the Glee club blames Marley for losing sectionals. However, when Sue disbands Glee club, she is the only one to stand beside Finn as he tries to keep the group together and finds them a place to practice. The group is reunited but they still haven't entirely forgiven Marley. However, they also acknowledge that Kitty is also at fault.

On Christmas, Marley is depressed when they are unable to afford a Christmas tree because they need to pay her doctor. When Sue, who was assigned to be Millie's Secret Santa, overhears this, she feels bad for them and, with Becky Jackson, gives Marley a Christmas tree and $800 in cash to pay her doctor (a rare act of kindness shown by Sue). Marley thanks Sue by having the Glee club perform a rendition of "Have Yourself a Merry Little Christmas" by Judy Garland.

Come Valentine's Day, Jake expresses his love for Marley with help from Ryder (who also had feelings for Marley) via a rendition of You're All I Need to Get By by Marvin Gaye, leading to Marley being impressed. At the time of Mr. Schuester's wedding to Emma Pillsbury, following Emma running from the altar after kissing Finn Hudson, Ryder intimately expresses himself to Marley and kisses her, leading to a conflict with Jake when he finds out after Marley tells him. Following Finn confessing to Mr. Schue that he kissed Emma, the tension between the two becomes unbearable and leads to Finn resigning. Before he does, Marley goes to thank him and tells him that he is a good teacher and should get a teaching degree. This is what inspires Finn to go back to college.

Marley starts to write original songs but no one seems to take notice. However, when Becky Jackson brings a gun to school and it accidentally fires, the students hide in fear of a school shooter. During this time, Kitty confesses that she sabotaged Marley's costume and apologizes for making her bulimic. After the school shooting, Sue takes responsibility to protect Becky and resigns as the coach of the Cheerios. Later, three of Marley's songs are performed, one of them at Regionals, "All or Nothing", to a standing ovation.

=== Season 5 ===
Marley is promoted to the main cast in this season. In this season, she gets into a skirmish with a Cheerio named Bree, who is tasked by Sue Sylvester, who has returned to McKinley High and demoted Principal Figgins to the role of janitor, to take down the Glee Club and promoted to Cheerio captain, despite having drenched Tina Cohen-Chang during her senior prom when she wins prom queen. This season, the first not to feature Finn Hudson following the passing of Cory Monteith, goes on to further explore how the Glee club is faring without him. It is tested in "A Katy or a Gaga" when Marley, who was supposed to dress in a seashell bikini, refuses and instead wears a Katy costume during a rendition of Lady Gaga's "Applause". This leads to a frustrated Will suspending her from Glee Club for a week. Jake comforts her by taking her back to his house to copulate but when she refuses to go further because she is uncomfortable, this leads to an argument between the two where she lashes out at Jake for objectifying girls.

Marley finds out that Jake had been cheating on her with Bree and as a result, she breaks up with him, despite his numerous apologies and attempts to win her back. She decides that they are better off as friends. She puts her love life to the side to focus on her songwriting career but is unsuccessful at getting anyone to accept her music, later revealing to Ryder her intentions to quit the New Directions. In order to change her mind, Ryder teams up with Jake Puckerman and give Marley's songs to Mercedes Jones, who comforts Marley and advises her never to give up on her dreams. Things take a turn for the worse when the New Directions loses Nationals, giving Sue Sylvester the excuse she needed to disband Glee Club. Even Holly Holliday and April Rhodes are unable to convince her to change her mind. Marley consoles her friends by telling her that Sue could never take away what they had, telling them that Glee Club brought them together, bidding them all farewell.

=== Season 6 ===
Marley is transferred to another school after the glee club is disbanded. She appears in Jagged Little Tapestry through the use of archival footage, seen sitting behind Blaine Anderson during a mashup of Will You Love Me Tomorrow and Head Over Feet. Her whereabouts during the season remain unknown. In The Hurt Locker, Part Two, she is mentioned by Rachel as "the one with the fat mom". Benoist did not return in the series finale "Dreams Come True", despite being invited, due to scheduling conflicts.

== Creation and casting ==
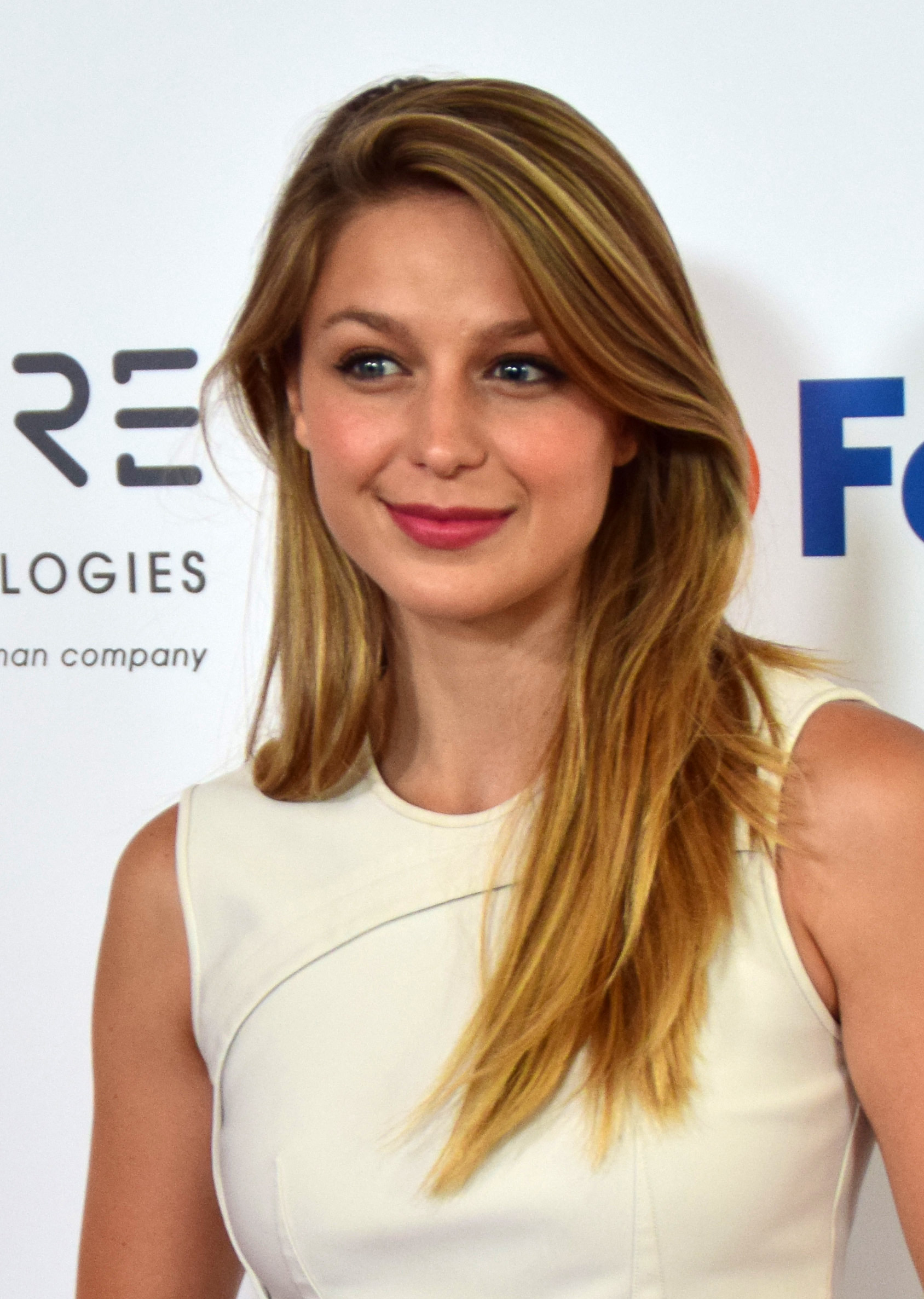
Melissa Benoist (pictured) was praised by Carl Cortez of Assignment X for "adding softness to a show wading in a sea of bitchiness".

Marley first appears in the season premiere of the fourth season of Glee. Introduced as a wallflower who was also the daughter of the obese lunch lady, Millie Rose (played by Trisha Rae Stahl), Marley is written as a frequent target of bullying in regards to her mother being the cafeteria lady and overweight. Marley is played by actress Melissa Benoist. Growing up, Benoist, a native of Colorado, grew up as a fan of the series, revealing that she would watch it with a friend. She describes the cast members, including Kevin McHale and Heather Morris, as kind and extremely welcoming. In an interview with Sierra Tishgart of Teen Vogue, Benoist said of her casting:

I first auditioned in New York at the Roundabout Theatre Company, and then went through five auditions all with different songs. I sang a Regina Spektor song, "Fidelity," a couple of musical theatre songs, and the last songs I performed were "King of Anything" by Sara Bareilles and a Colbie Caillat song. I love female singer-songwriters! And then I had two screen tests in California for [creator] Ryan Murphy and his team, and I haven't been back to New York since I got the job. I started working the day I found out that I got the part. The producers had been looking for Marley for a really long time, and then when it happened, they threw me into wardrobe fittings and dance rehearsals.

Although marketed as "the New Rachel", there has been a lot pointed out in how dissimilar the two characters are. Some fans have also expressed disappointment in Lea Michele and Melissa Benoist not sharing a scene together despite Marley's first song being a duet with Rachel Berry. In the show, Marley is not portrayed as ambitious as Rachel, instead having smaller interests and a completely opposite lifestyle. In an "I Heart Glee" interview, Benoist herself has stated that she does not think of Marley as a new Rachel, stating, "I would never even want to compare myself to Lea Michele, you know? She is amazing, like, on her own level, and so I always get, like, weird when people say that." Benoist has also expressed a desire for young girls to be able to relate to Marley's struggles with issues like bullying and bulimia.

While promoting the show, Benoist appeared on Anderson Live, where Anderson Cooper gifted her with a face mask to prevent her from getting slushied again. She also appeared in interviews alongside Jacob Artist and Kevin McHale. Outside the Denver Center for Performing Arts, Matthew Morrison, who plays Will Schuester on the series, revealed in an interview with John Moore that he and Benoist both shared stories of skiing when in Colorado and praised Benoist as an absolute delight to work with.

== Musical performances ==
Erin Strecker of Entertainment Weekly gave the "New York State of Mind" duet an A−, writing "Sung in part by both Marley and Rachel, in an arrangement that was lovely for both voices, it was a great introduction for newcomer Marley, as well as a reminder after a summer apart that Berry has still got it." Strecker also offered praise to Benoist's rendition of "Chasing Pavements" by Adele.

Lauren Hoffman of Vulture also wrote positively, stating, "Marley goes riff for riff and punch for punch with Rachel. And the difference between watching Marley and Rachel perform is that when Marley sings it looks like fun, and when Rachel sings it looks like work." The rendition of New York State of Mind by Michele and Benoist peaked at number 24 on the Bubbling Under Hot 100 chart.

Later performances by Marley received more critical responses. In The Role You Were Born to Play, the decision to use "Blow Me (One Last Kiss)" by P!nk was criticized by Karen Walsh of Entertainment Weekly as being a poor choice for an audition song but nevertheless, insisted that she "dug the harmonies on this, and the word changes." Natalie Fisher of Hypable described Benoist's duet with Becca Tobin in a rendition of Bonnie Tyler's "Holding Out for a Hero" as having "more lesbian sexual tension than anything in the entire Brittana plot line. Kitty’s got a whip, Kitty’s wrapping Marley up in her whip, and Kitty’s using her whip as a rotating fan to create a wind machine effect on Marley’s hair." Michael Slezak of TV Line praised Benoist's duet with Cory Monteith on "Don't Dream It's Over" which later developed into a group performance, writing, "What an absolutely gorgeous choice…someone ought to sagely scoop this one up on The Voice or The X Factor".

Erin Strecker of Entertainment Weekly gave Benoist's duet with Heather Morris, a rendition of "Tell Him" by the Exciters, a B+, writing, "it wasn’t the strongest of the night, but it was a fun couple of minutes". She responded more positively to her duet with Alex Newell in a performance of "Locked Out of Heaven" by Bruno Mars. Sandra Gonzalez gave Benoist's rendition of "Superstition" by Stevie Wonder alongside Amber Riley and Darren Criss an A−, writing, "Marley gets in touch with her inner diva, thanks to some help (and killer riffs) from Mercedes. Nicely done, ladies. Where were you when Marley was having her freak out in November, Mercedes?"

Rae Votta of Billboard was critical of Benoist's rendition of "Wrecking Ball" in The End of Twerk, writing, "Jake’s cheating comes out this episode, and in response Marley performs the most demur [sic] version of “Wrecking Ball” that you get why Miley Cyrus might have wanted to change her whole vibe. They try to recreate the video, but it comes off more like a college comedy troupe tried to spoof it, without the intentional humor."

== Reception ==
Critical reception towards Marley has been somewhat lukewarm. In a review for "The New Rachel", Emily St. James of The A.V. Club expressed hope for the character, stating that she hoped "Benoist would be up for the challenge as Lea Michele was." Carl Cortez of Assignment X praised Marley as adding "softness to a show wading in a sea of bitchiness".

Fan reception to Marley was more polarized. A majority of fans who were in support of Rachel Berry took to express discomfort towards casting a replacement while some were disappointed that she was not living up to expectations. Others, however, reacted more positively to the fresh take on personality and offered praise to Benoist's performance.
