= Blake Jenner =

American actor (born 1992)

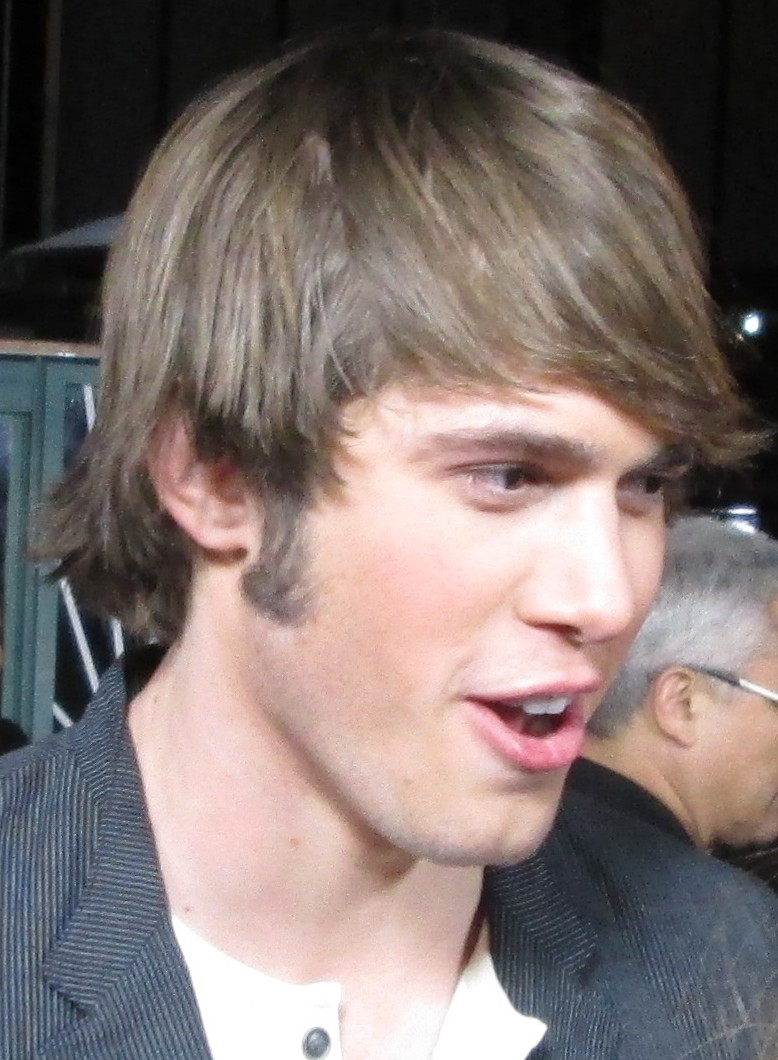
- Jenner in 2013
- Born: Blake Alexander Jenner; August 27, 1992 (age 34); Miami, Florida, U.S.
- Occupations: Actor; singer
- Years active: 2010–present
- Spouses: Melissa Benoist; (m. 2013 or 2015; (Note: Sources disagree as to the year Jenner and Benoist were married. See §Personal life) div. 2017)

Blake Alexander Jenner (born August 27, 1992) is an American actor. Jenner won the second season of Oxygen's The Glee Project and, as a result, portrayed Ryder Lynn on the Fox musical comedy-drama series Glee. He has since had starring and supporting roles in Everybody Wants Some!! (2016), The Edge of Seventeen (2016), American Animals (2018), and What/If (2019).

== Early life ==
Jenner was born in Miami, Florida, on August 27, 1992, the son of Mitzy and Richard Vernon Jenner. His mother is of Cuban descent, from a family from Santiago de Cuba. He is the youngest of four sons, having three elder brothers, Mike, Derrick and Richard.

He grew up interested in music and film and began playing drums at age nine. He attended Felix Varela High School, where he joined the school's drama society Troupe 6162 and played varsity football and wrestled.

Saying he was "in love with improv and comedy," he began improvisation lessons and participated in stage productions at the Roxy Performing Arts Center. In 2008, he became a member of "Impromedy", a sketch comedy improv group based in Miami.

== Career ==
Eager to pursue a career in acting, Jenner left Miami and moved to Los Angeles after graduating from high school a year early, with just $2,500. While residing in California, he took on many jobs including a waiter, clothing store associate, and parrot salesman while auditioning for acting roles. He continually attended improv classes at The Groundlings, and eventually did a guest show with that company two years later. By 2011, he was cast in the short films Wurlitzer and The Truth In Being Right and the horror film Cousin Sarah. He also made a guest appearance on ABC Family's sitcom Melissa & Joey as Miller Collins.

In 2012, he was selected through industry channels to audition as one of 15 contestants on the second season of The Glee Project, a television reality show for which the prize was a guaranteed seven-episode arc on the following season of Glee. He was one of three finalists and ultimately won. After appearing as Ryder Lynn on the fourth season of Glee, he was later nominated and won the Teen Choice Award for Choice TV Breakout Star. Jenner, along with co-stars Jacob Artist, Becca Tobin, Alex Newell, and Melissa Benoist, was promoted to series regular status for the fifth season.

In the summer of 2013, Jenner wrote the screenplay for Billy Boy. He and Benoist went on Kickstarter to ask fans to help fund the project's production; as of December 11, 2013, the project has reached its $100,000 goal. Jenner was subsequently cast in the horror film Within. In late 2015, Jenner was cast in a recurring role as Adam Foster on Supergirl, playing opposite his then-wife Melissa Benoist, who stars as the series' title character. His first appearance aired on January 25, 2016.

In 2016, Jenner starred as Jake Bradford in Richard Linklater's comedy film Everybody Wants Some!!, which was released on March 30, and played Hailee Steinfeld's character's brother in the coming-of-age drama The Edge of Seventeen. He was in the cast of Shawn Christensen's drama film The Vanishing of Sidney Hall, which premiered at the 2017 Sundance Film Festival and was released in 2018. He was in the cast of Bart Layton's crime drama film American Animals. It premiered at the 2018 Sundance Film Festival and was released in June 2018, by The Orchard and MoviePass Ventures. Jenner played Christian de Neuvillette in the Goodspeed Musical production's Cyrano at the Norma Terris Theatre in August and September 2018.

Jenner played Sean in What/If, Netflix's 2019 anthology neo-noir thriller series. In August 2019, it was announced that Jenner would star in Richard Linklater's film adaptation of Merrily We Roll Along, which would be shot over the course of twenty years. Jenner had been set to star alongside Beanie Feldstein and Ben Platt. On January 10, 2023, it was announced that Jenner would be replaced in Merrily We Roll Along by Paul Mescal.

== Personal life ==
Jenner became engaged to his former Glee co-star Melissa Benoist in 2013 and the pair reportedly married in 2015. The same year, Benoist commented that they had been married "longer than anybody knows," with some sources claiming that the couple actually wed in 2013. Benoist filed for divorce in late December 2016, citing irreconcilable differences, and the divorce was finalized in December 2017.

In 2019, Benoist shared an Instagram video detailing her experience as a survivor of domestic violence. She revealed that a 2015 injury, which tore her iris and permanently enlarged her pupil, resulted from a phone being thrown at her during a domestic dispute. Benoist described the incident as a part of a pattern of repeated abuse in the relationship. She and Jenner were married at the time. Benoist also stated she had experienced extreme control, manipulation, and cycles of severe violence including being slapped, punched, shoved into a wall, dragged by her hair, and choked during the relationship. In October 2020, Jenner responded via an Instagram post in which he admitted to causing the eye injury and confirmed the infliction of abuse throughout the relationship. He also alleged that the abuse during their relationship had been mutual and that she had physically assaulted him during the relationship, resulting in injury. Benoist had previously stated in her original Instagram video that she began fighting back in defense against Jenner's attacks during their relationship.

== Filmography ==
=== Film ===
Year	Title	Role	Notes
2010	Fresh 2 Death	Connor	Short film
2011	Wurlitzer	Alexander Moore	Short film; also producer
2011	Cousin Sarah	Brett Marks	
2012	The Truth In Being Right	Jeffrey	Short film
2014	Love at First Site	Sydney Reynolds	Short film
2016	Everybody Wants Some!!	Jake Bradford	
2016	The Edge of Seventeen	Darian Franklin	
2016	Within	Tommy	
2017	The Vanishing of Sidney Hall	Brett Newport	
2017	Billy Boy	Billy Forsetti	Also writer and producer
2018	American Animals	Chas Allen	
2022	Paradise City	Ryan Swan	

=== Television ===
Year	Title	Role	Notes
2011	Melissa & Joey	Miller Collins	Episode: "A House Divided"
2012	The Glee Project	Himself	Reality television; main cast (season 2)
2012–2015	Glee	Ryder Lynn	Recurring role (season 4); main cast (season 5); guest star (season 6)
2013	MasterChef	Himself	Episode: "Top 14 Compete"
2016	Supergirl	Adam Foster	2 episodes
2019	What/If	Sean	Main cast
2023	The Proposal Spot	Pete Sandres	Television film

=== Video games ===
Year	Title	Role	Notes
2018	NBA 2K19 – My Career Mode	Howie Carter	Voice and motion pictures
2019	NBA 2K20 - My Career Mode	Assistant GM	Voice and motion pictures

== Stage ==
=== Regional ===
Year	Title	Role	Venue	Refs
2018	Cyrano	Christian de Neuvillette	Goodspeed Musical production	

=== Off-Broadway ===
Year	Title	Role	Venue	Refs
2019	Cyrano	Christian de Neuvillette	The New Group production	

== Awards and nominations ==
Year	Award	Category	Work	Result
2013	Teen Choice Awards	Choice TV: Breakout Star	Glee	Won
2017	San Diego Film Festival	Rising Star		Won
