= Fábrica de Cine =

Mexican film production company

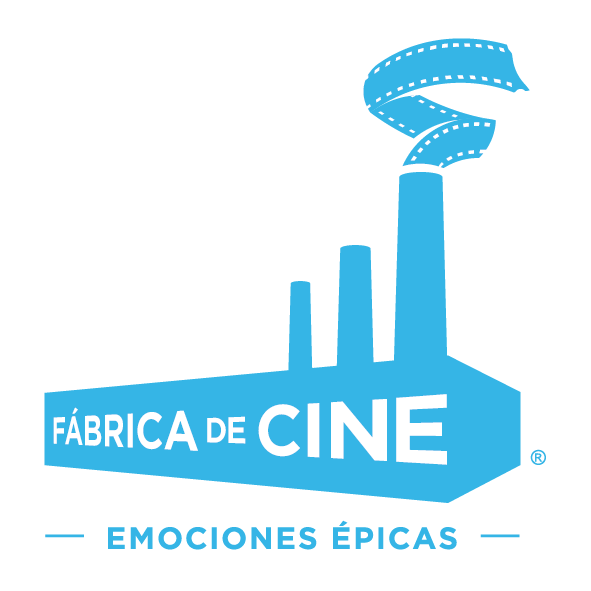
- Trade name: Fabrica Global Media
- Company type: Private
- Industry: Entertainment; Motion picture
- Founder: Gastón Pavlovich
- Headquarters: Los Angeles; Mexico City
- Number of locations: 2
- Area served: Worldwide
- Products: Film production; Television shows
- Services: Film production; Television production

Fábrica de Cine is a production company founded in October 2013 by Gastón Pavlovich and specializes in film and television production. Gastón has worked alongside Jerry Lewis in Max Rose, Tom Hanks in A Hologram for the King and Mel Gibson in the biopic The Professor and the Madman. Fábrica de Cine was also responsible for the production of Silence and The Irishman, both directed by Martin Scorsese.

As of 2022, the company has received a total of 13 Academy Award nominations.

== Filmography ==
- El Estudiante (2009)
- Little Baby Jesus (2013)
- Max Rose (2013)
- The Price of Desire (2015)
- A Hologram for the King (2016)
- Silence (2016)
- Sun Dogs (2017)
- Loving Vincent (2017)
- Waiting for the Miracle to Come (2018)
- 108 Costuras (2018)
- Prometo No Enamorarme (2018)
- The Professor and the Madman (2019)
- The Irishman (2019)
