= Melissa Benoist =

American actress and singer (born 1988)

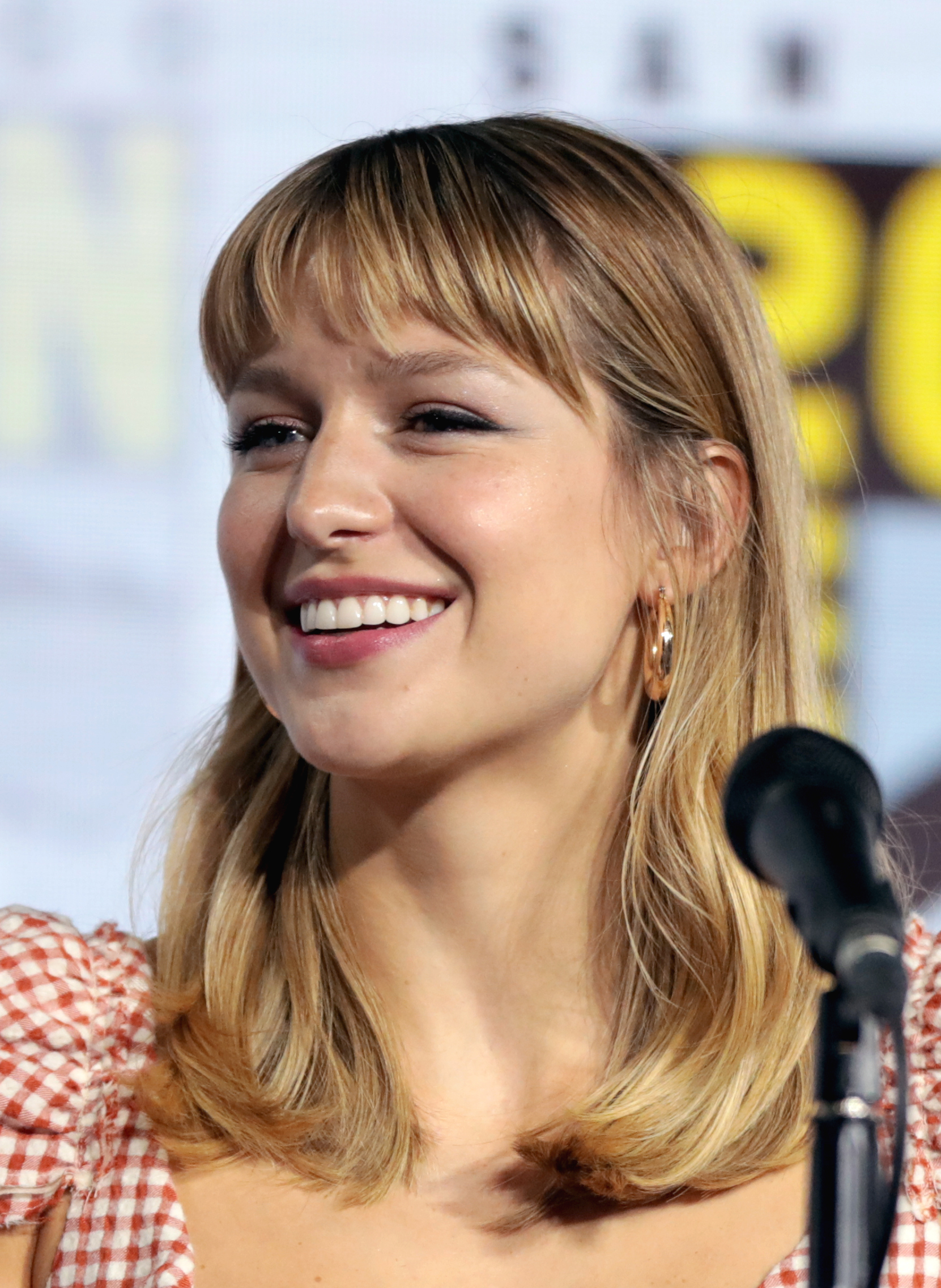
- Benoist at the 2019 San Diego Comic-Con
- Born: Melissa Marie Benoist; October 4, 1988 (age 38); Houston, Texas, U.S.
- Education: Marymount Manhattan College (BA)
- Occupations: Actress; singer
- Years active: 2000–present
- Spouses: Blake Jenner (m. c. 2013; (Note: Married between 2013 to 2015; sources differ. See § Personal life.) div. 2017); Chris Wood (m. 2019)
- Children: 1

Melissa Marie Benoist (/bəˈnɔɪst/ bə-NOYST; born October 4, 1988) is an American actress and singer. Her first major role was as Marley Rose on the Fox musical comedy-drama Glee (2012–2014), in which she was a series regular during the fifth season. She rose to widespread prominence for portraying Kara Danvers on the CBS/CW superhero series Supergirl (2015–2021).

Benoist's film appearances include the drama Whiplash (2014), the comedy-drama Danny Collins (2015), the crime comedy Band of Robbers (2015), the romantic Western The Longest Ride (2015), the action thriller Patriots Day (2016), the drama Lowriders (2016), and the comedy-drama Sun Dogs (2017). She also portrayed the wife of cult leader David Koresh on the Paramount Network miniseries Waco (2018). On stage, Benoist made her Broadway debut in 2018 as Carole King in the jukebox musical Beautiful: The Carole King Musical.

== Early life and education ==
Benoist was born in Houston, Texas, to Julie and Jim Benoist, a physician. They divorced when she was thirteen years old in 2002. Her paternal great-grandfather was of French descent. She has two sisters: Jessica, a novelist, and Kristina, an ecological scientist, and five half-siblings from her father's remarriage. She was raised mostly by her mother in the suburbs of Denver, Colorado, after her parents' separation. Growing up in Colorado, a large part of her childhood was spent exploring national parks and immersing herself in nature.

She began dance classes at the age of three in 1992, focusing on jazz, ballet, and tap. In 1993 when she was four years old, her aunt put her in a church play that she was directing. Following that she began performing in community children's theatre in her hometown.

As a teenager, Benoist performed at Disneyland in various medleys of musical songs for three summers with the Academy of Theatre Arts, a musical theatre school she was attending, located in Littleton, Colorado. Benoist performed locally in a number of theatrical productions, including A Month in the Country, Cinderella, A Chorus Line, and Bye Bye Birdie at the Town Hall Arts Center, a professional theatre located in the Denver metro area. Instead of attending high school graduation parties, she performed the play Evita with other cast members at the former Country Dinner Playhouse.

In 2006, The Denver Post named Benoist one of Colorado's five "Can't Miss Kids". She graduated from Arapahoe High School in Centennial, Colorado, in 2007, and relocated to New York City to pursue a career in musical theatre. Benoist initially attended Marymount Manhattan College for the BFA musical theatre program but in her sophomore year, she switched majors to theatre, this was due to her admiration for 19th-century Russian plays. In 2011, Benoist graduated from Marymount Manhattan College with a Bachelor of Arts in Theatre Arts. While attending college, she played Millie Dilmount in an urban off-off-Broadway production of Thoroughly Modern Millie and Rosalind in As You Like It at the Theresa Lang Theatre.

== Career ==
=== 2008–2011: Early work ===
Benoist's first film was Tennessee in 2008 along with singer Mariah Carey. Afterwards, she made guest appearances on the shows Law & Order: Criminal Intent, Blue Bloods, Homeland, and The Good Wife, while attending college. She played Kelly in the 2011 Goodspeed Musicals theatrical production of The Unauthorized Autobiography of Samantha Brown by Bree Lowdermilk and Kait Kerrigan at the Norma Terris Theatre.

=== 2012–2014: Rise to prominence with Glee and film roles ===
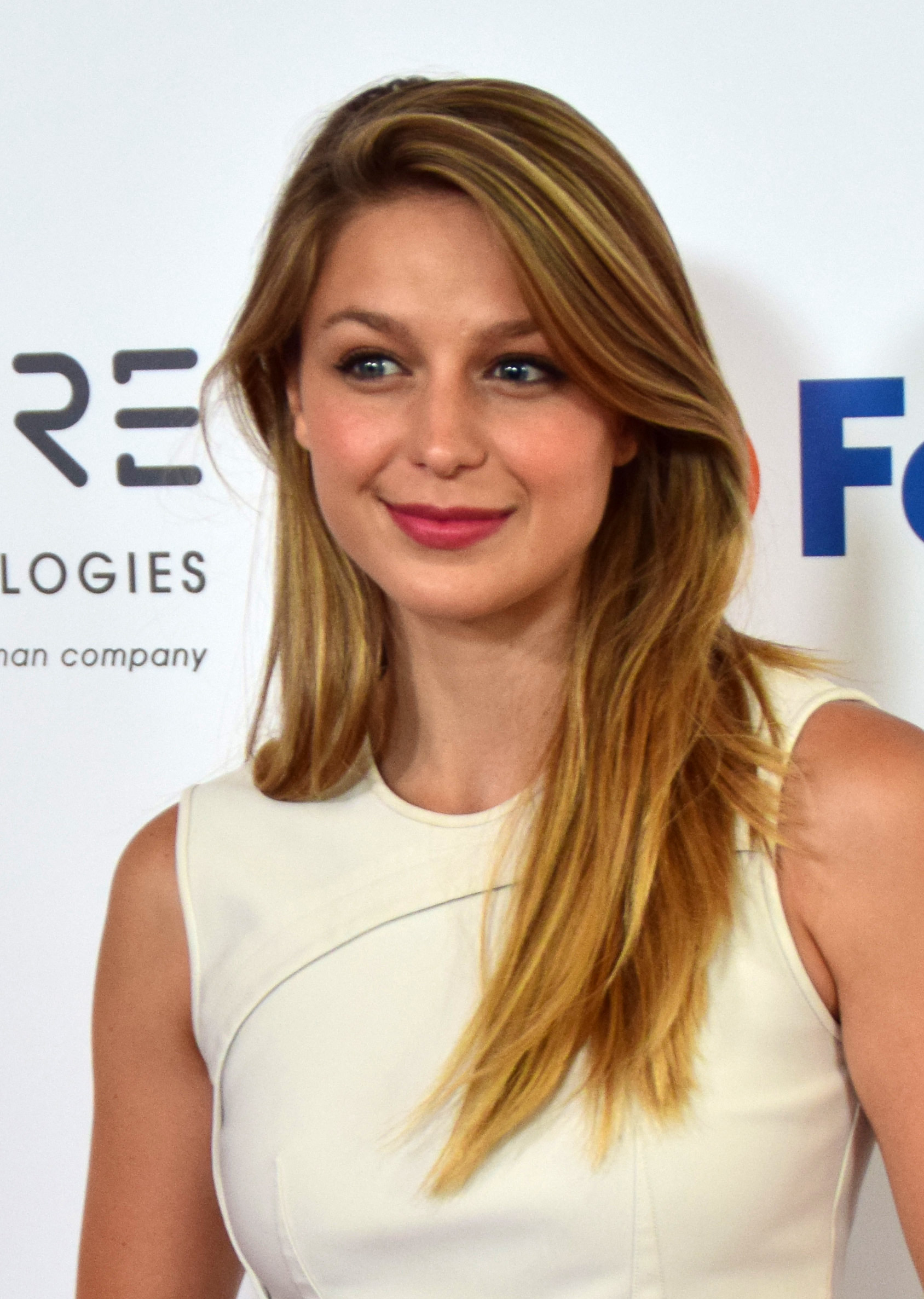
Benoist in 2015 at the 6th Annual Thirst Project Gala

In May 2012, Benoist auditioned for the musical comedy-drama series Glee in New York at the Roundabout Theatre Company, singing a different song for each of her five auditions including: "Fidelity" by Regina Spektor, "King of Anything" by Sara Bareilles, a Colbie Caillat song, and several musical theatre pieces. In July, she had two screen tests in California for series creator/writer, Ryan Murphy, the casting directors, and executive producers. She portrayed Marley Rose on the fourth and fifth seasons of Glee. Her first appearance as Marley Rose was in the first episode of season four, titled "The New Rachel". Because the creators had been looking for Marley for a long time, she started working the same day she found out that she got the part. Benoist's first performance was a duet of "New York State of Mind" with Lea Michele, during the first episode of season 4. The cover of the song reached twenty-four on the Bubbling Under Hot 100 Singles chart. She and Glee co-star Darren Criss appeared with Josh Duhamel in the opening of the 2013 Kids' Choice Awards. That same year, she was selected as an ambassador for Coca-Cola's new product, P10 300 mL Coke Mismo. In June 2013, they were flown to Manila, Philippines, to endorse the product by visiting various malls and meeting with fans. She, along with several other actors, was not called back for Glee in early 2014.

In mid-2013, Benoist and Blake Jenner held a Kickstarter campaign to help fund the production of their feature film Billy Boy. The project reached its $100,000 goal. Benoist played Nicole in Damien Chazelle's 2014 independent drama film Whiplash, which won top prizes (Grand Jury and Audience awards) at the 2014 Sundance Film Festival. In June 2014, she joined Nicholas Sparks' film adaptation of The Longest Ride as Marcia. She had a role in the 2015 film Danny Collins. She played the part of Jamie, a desk clerk at a hotel frequented by one of Jamie's all-time favorite rock stars. That same year, Benoist also played Becky Thatcher in Band of Robbers, a modern-day retelling of The Adventures of Tom Sawyer and Adventures of Huckleberry Finn by Mark Twain. In May 2015, it was announced that Benoist would be playing Lorelai in the film Lowriders, replacing Lily Collins and Nicola Peltz, who were in talks for the role previously. In August of that year, she landed the leading role in the Screen Gems drama feature film Oxford.

=== 2015–present: Supergirl and Broadway debut ===
In October 2015, the superhero adventure series Supergirl, with Benoist in the lead role of Kara Zor-El, premiered on CBS. She became the first woman to lead a prime time superhero television series since Lynda Carter's Wonder Woman went off the air in 1979. The premiere was watched by 12.96 million viewers and received a full season order by CBS on November 30, 2015. She was reportedly the first actress looked at for the role. Benoist generally received positive reviews for her portrayal of Kara Zor-El. The series later moved to The CW before its second-season premiere. She reprised her role in The CW's Arrowverse crossovers "Invasion!", "Crisis on Earth-X", "Elseworlds", and "Crisis on Infinite Earths" as well as The Flash musical episode "Duet". She reprised her role as Earth-X's Supergirl doppelgänger Overgirl in the CW Seed animated series Freedom Fighters: The Ray. She also made her directorial debut for one episode during season five. For her portrayal of Supergirl, she received the Breakthrough Performance Award at The 42nd Saturn Awards and two Best Actress on a Television Series Award at the 44th and 45th editions respectively. The series concluded on November 9, 2021, after six seasons and 126 episodes.

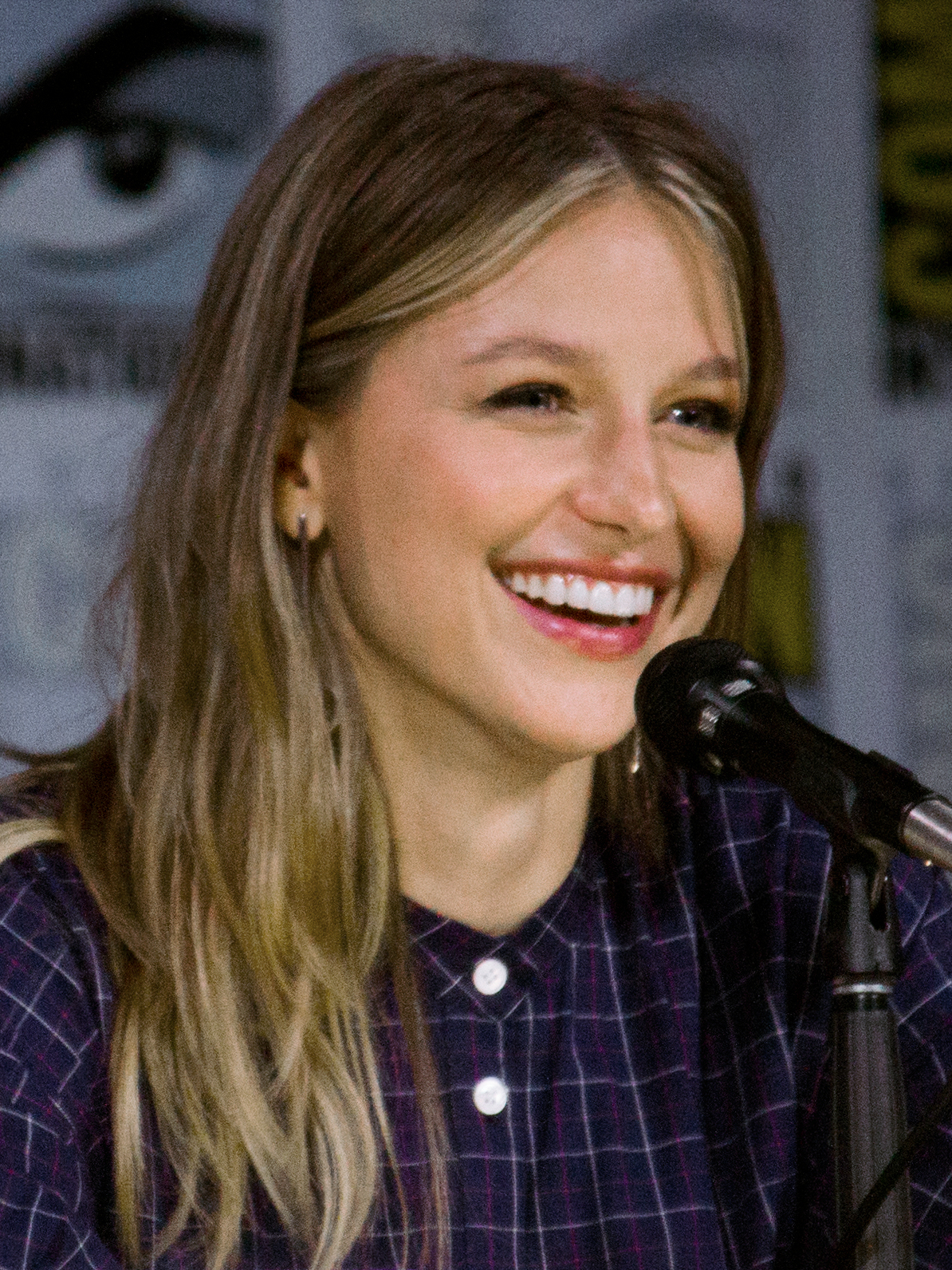
Benoist at 2017 San Diego Comic-Con

In May 2016, Benoist was cast as Katherine Russell, the widow of deceased Boston Marathon bomber Tamerlan Tsarnaev, in Peter Berg's drama film Patriots Day. In June, it was announced that she was set to star in the comedy-drama film Sun Dogs. Also in that month, the Human Rights Campaign released a video in tribute to the victims of the Orlando nightclub shooting; in the video, Benoist and others told the stories of the people killed there. In April 2017, Benoist was cast as Rachel Koresh, the legal wife of Branch Davidians cult leader David Koresh in Paramount Network's miniseries Waco. Benoist was featured in "The Super Duper Minecraft Musical!" which was made for Minecraft's Super Duper Graphics Pack in November.

On May 7, 2018, it was announced that Benoist would be playing the titular character in the Broadway show Beautiful: The Carole King Musical at the Stephen Sondheim Theatre, which marked her Broadway debut for a limited run from June 7 through August 4, 2018. Benoist stated that the run felt like “coming home” to her theater roots and a “manifestation of a lot of her childhood dreams,” as theater was her first passion. In February 2021, she started a production company, Three Things Productions, with an overall deal at Warner Bros. Television Studios.

In June 2022, it was announced that Three Things Productions had renewed its overall deal with Warner Bros. Television and that she will officially join the HBO Max series The Girls on the Bus inspired by a chapter in Amy Chozick’s 2018 novel Chasing Hillary, which was based on the author’s time covering Hillary Clinton’s 2016 presidential campaign as a political reporter. Deadline revealed in February that Benoist was in talks to reunite with Berlanti Productions for the political campaign drama series. In June, it was confirmed that she will star as Sadie McCarthy, a journalist who romanticizes Tim Crouse's The Boys on the Bus book and who scrapped her whole life for her own shot at covering a presidential campaign. Benoist also served as a producer for the series.

On September 18, 2024, Deadline Hollywood reported that she had joined the cast of the Netflix family drama The Waterfront.

On December 5, 2024, Deadline Hollywood reported Benoist would star in and executive produce a new NBC drama series, Duo, which was in development by her company, Three Things Productions.

== Other ventures ==
On October 26, 2021, she published her first book, Haven’s Secret, the first installment of The Powers series from Abrams Kids. The series is a middle grade fantasy and was co-written by Benoist with her sister Jessica Benoist and author Mariko Tamaki. Haven's Secret received recognition as a 2022 Kansas Notable Book in June of 2022.

== Personal life ==
During her first semester in college, when she was learning to ride a bike, a cab backed into her and left a visible scar above her eyebrows. She also has a tattoo of a bicycle on her left foot.

In 2015, it was announced that she and her Glee co-star Blake Jenner were married. Benoist commented that they had been married "longer than anybody knows", with some sources claiming that the couple actually wed the same year of their engagement in 2013. In late December 2016, she filed for divorce citing "irreconcilable differences". The divorce was finalized in December 2017.

Also in 2015, Benoist suffered an injury that tore her iris. The incident caused one pupil to be enlarged. In November 2019, Benoist shared an Instagram video chronicling her experience as a survivor of domestic violence in order to raise awareness. She revealed that the injury to her iris was due to an iPhone being thrown at her during a domestic dispute, in a relationship marred by repeated abuse. Previously, the injury had been said to have been caused when she tripped down stairs and fell into a potted plant. Benoist also stated in her video that she had experienced extreme control, manipulation, and cycles of severe violence including being slapped, punched, shoved into a wall, dragged by her hair, and choked during the relationship. In October 2020, her ex-husband Blake Jenner wrote a lengthy Instagram post in which he admitted to causing the eye injury and confirmed the infliction of abuse throughout the relationship. He also stated that she had physically assaulted him at other times, resulting in injury. Benoist previously stated in her original video that she began fighting back in defense against Jenner's attacks during the relationship. Benoist has discussed healing from the trauma of the relationship and stated that doing EMDR therapy saved her life.

In 2016, Benoist met Chris Wood when he was cast as Mon-El in the second season of Supergirl, and their romantic relationship was confirmed in 2017. On the relationship she recalls, "we met each other at the perfect time in our lives." In October 2017, Benoist helped with Wood's launch of his campaign "IDONTMIND" which works to decrease stigma around mental health and provide resources and education. She discussed her own struggle with depression and anxiety attacks since she was 13 years old. She said that Wood's words encouraged her to share her own issues with depression with others. Benoist and Wood announced their engagement on February 10, 2019, and married in September 2019, holding a private ceremony in Ojai, California. Their son was born in September 2020.

== Filmography ==
=== Film ===
Year	Title	Role	Notes
2008	Tennessee	Laurel	
2014	Whiplash	Nicole	
2015	Band of Robbers	Becky Thatcher	
2015	Danny Collins	Jamie	
2015	The Longest Ride	Marcia	
2016	Lowriders	Lorelai Baker	
2016	Patriots Day	Katherine Russell	
2017	Billy Boy	Jennifer	
2017	Sun Dogs	Tally Petersen	
2019	Jay and Silent Bob Reboot	Herself / female Chronic	Cameo
2022	Clerks III	Auditioner	Cameo

=== Television ===
Year	Title	Role	Notes
2010	Blue Bloods	Renee	Episode: "Privilege"
2010	The Good Wife	Molly	Episode: "Nine Hours"
2010	Law & Order: Criminal Intent	Jessalyn Kerr	Episode: "Delicate"
2010	Law & Order: Special Victims Unit	Ava	Episode: "Wet"
2011	Homeland	Stacy Moore	Episodes: "Grace", "Clean Skin"
2012–2014	Glee	Marley Rose	Recurring role (season 4); main role (season 5)
2015–2021	Supergirl	Kara Danvers / Supergirl (Note: Benoist also portrayed Bizarro in the episode "Bizarro".) (Note: Benoist also portrayed Overgirl in the crossover "Crisis on Earth-X".)	Main role, 126 episodes; also director: "Deus Lex Machina"
2016–2019	The Flash	Kara Danvers / Supergirl	Recurring role; 5 episodes
2016–2020	Arrow	Kara Danvers / Supergirl	Recurring role; 5 episodes
2016–2020	Legends of Tomorrow	Kara Danvers / Supergirl	Recurring role; 3 episodes
2018	Waco	Rachel Koresh	Miniseries; 6 episodes
2019	Batwoman	Kara Danvers / Supergirl	Episode: "Crisis on Infinite Earths, Part Two"
2020	Robot Chicken	Laura, Malorie Hayes, Glen's Classmate	Voice role; episode: "Sundancer Craig in: 30% of the Way to Crying"
2024	Masters of the Universe	Teela	Voice role; main role (in Revolution)
2024	The Girls on the Bus	Sadie McCarthy	Main role; also producer
2025	The Waterfront	Bree Buckley	Main role
TBA	Myron Bolitar	Valerie Simpson	Recurring role, upcoming series

=== Web ===
Year	Title	Role	Notes
2017–2018	Freedom Fighters: The Ray	Kara Zor-El / Overgirl	Voice role Earth-X version of Supergirl; 3 episodes

== Theatre ==
Year	Title	Role	Venue	Ref.
2000	The Sound of Music	Brigitta von Trapp	Country Dinner Playhouse	
2003	The Sound of Music	Liesl von Trapp	Littleton Town Hall Arts Center	
2006	Bye Bye Birdie	Kim McAfee	Littleton Town Hall Arts Center	
2006	A Chorus Line	Bebe Benzenheimer	Littleton Town Hall Arts Center	
2006	A Month in the Country	Vera Aleksandrovna	Littleton Town Hall Arts Center	
2006	Rodgers and Hammerstein's Cinderella	Cinderella	Littleton Town Hall Arts Center	
2007	Footloose	Ariel Moore	Littleton Town Hall Arts Center	
2007	Evita	Perón's Mistress	Country Dinner Playhouse	
2007	The 25th Annual Putnam County Spelling Bee	Olive Ostrovsky	Arapahoe High School (Colorado)	
2009	As You Like It	Rosalind	Theresa Lang Theatre	
2009	Thoroughly Modern Millie	Millie Dilmount	Marymount Manhattan College	
2011	The Unauthorized Biography of Samantha Brown	Kelly	Goodspeed Musicals	
2018	Beautiful: The Carole King Musical	Carole King	Stephen Sondheim Theatre	
2018	Terms of Endearment	Emma Greenway-Horton	Geffen Playhouse	
2026	Spectacular	Unknown	Hayworth Theatre	

== Soundtrack performances ==
Year	Songs	Album
2012	"Born to Hand Jive", "Look at Me I'm Sandra Dee (Reprise)", "You're the One That I Want"	Glee: The Music Presents Glease
2012	"New York State of Mind", "Holding Out for a Hero", "Some Nights"	Glee: The Music, Season 4, Volume 1
2012	"Have Yourself a Merry Little Christmas", "The First Noël"	Glee: The Music, The Christmas Album Volume 3
2012	"Chasing Pavements", "Blow Me (One Last Kiss)", "Don't Dream It's Over" , "Locked Out of Heaven", "Diamonds Are A Girl's Best Friend"/"Material Girl", "Anything Could Happen", "You Have More Friends Than You Know", "You're All I Need To Get By" "A Thousand Years"	Glee: The Music – The Complete Season Four
2012	"Crazy"/"(You Drive Me) Crazy", "Everytime", "Womanizer"	Britney 2.0
2013	"Mary's Boy Child", "Love Child", "Rockin' Around the Christmas Tree"	The Christmas Album Volume 4
2017	"Moon River", "Super Friend"	The Flash – Music from the Special Episode: Duet
2017	"Runnin' Home to You"	Supergirl – Crisis on Earth-X part 1 soundtrack
2021	"We Belong" ft. Jeremy Jordan	Supergirl: Season 6 (Original Television Soundtrack)

== Awards and nominations ==
Year	Award	Category	Nominated work	Result	Ref.
2013	Teen Choice Awards	Choice TV Breakout Star	Glee	Nominated	
2016	Saturn Awards	Best Actress on a Television Series	Supergirl	Nominated	
2016	Saturn Awards	Breakthrough Performance Award	Supergirl	Won	
2017	Saturn Awards	Best Actress on a Television Series	Supergirl	Won	
2017	Teen Choice Awards	Choice Action TV Actress	Supergirl	Won	
2017	Teen Choice Awards	Choice Liplock (with Chris Wood)	Supergirl	Nominated	
2017	Teen Choice Awards	Choice TV Ship (with Chris Wood)	Supergirl	Nominated	
2018	Saturn Awards	Best Actress on a Television Series	Supergirl	Nominated	
2018	Teen Choice Awards	Choice Action TV Actress	Supergirl	Won	
2019	Saturn Awards	Best Actress on a Television Series	Supergirl	Won	
2019	Teen Choice Awards	Choice Action TV Actress	Supergirl	Nominated	
2021	Critics' Choice Super Awards	Best Actress in a Superhero Series	Supergirl	Nominated	
2021	Saturn Awards	Best Actress on a Television Series	Supergirl	Nominated	
