= Mosaic Christian Church =

Mosaic Christian Church may refer to:

- Mosaic Church
- Megiddo church (Israel), an ancient Christian church that contains a mosaic
- Southeast Christian Church (Louisville, Kentucky)
