= Sun Dogs (2017 film) =

American comedy-drama film by Jennifer Morrison

- Film poster
- Directed by: Jennifer Morrison
- Written by: Raoul McFarland
- Produced by: Jennifer Morrison; Dickey Abedon; Andrew Carlberg; Anthony Tambakis; Gastón Pavlovich
- Starring: Michael Angarano; Melissa Benoist; Alvin "Xzibit" Joiner; Allison Janney; Ed O'Neill; Eric Christian Olsen; J. R. Ramirez
- Cinematography: Michael Alden Lloyd
- Edited by: Joe Talbot Hall
- Music by: Mark Isham
- Production company: Fábrica de Cine
- Distributed by: Netflix
- Release dates: June 18, 2017 (LAFF); April 6, 2018 (Netflix)
- Running time: 94 minutes
- Country: United States
- Language: English

Sun Dogs is a 2017 American comedy-drama film written by Raoul McFarland and starring Michael Angarano, Melissa Benoist, Xzibit, Allison Janney, and Ed O'Neill. The film marks the feature film directorial debut of actress Jennifer Morrison, who also plays a supporting role in the film. The film premiered at the LA Film Festival in June 2017 and was released on Netflix on April 6, 2018.

== Plot ==
Ned, mildly brain damaged during childbirth, lives with his mother Rose and stepfather Bob. His birthday is on September 11, so he repeatedly tries to enlist in the Marines. He works as a janitor at a casino. Bob can't work, being in a lawsuit against his truck-driving company for back injuries. Rose is frustrated but stays strong for Ned.

In Ned's latest attempt to enlist, Staff Sergeant Jenkins concocts a secret unit known as the Sun Dogs that watch out for Al-Qaeda cells in the US, appealing to Ned's desire to save lives. Ned believes him, passing out business cards identifying himself as a Marine special operative.

Ned encourages Rose to follow her dreams of becoming an EMT and moving to NYC. Realizing she has been using Ned as an excuse, she decides to finally go.

At the casino, Ned approaches Tally, unaware she is a prostitute trolling for business. When she is thrown out of the casino, he tells her about his mission. Believing Ned to be a Marine, Tally helps with his investigation of his boss, Sameer Udday, who Ned believes is an Al-Qaeda agent.

They grow close during multiple stakeouts of Udday, trailing and filming him. Tally, talented at filmmaking, makes and edits videos they submit as "evidence" to Jenkins. They enter the casino and steal Udday's emails. When Tally is seen, she is almost arrested for trespassing until Ned uses the sleeper hold on the security guard. He gets fired and Bob bails him out of jail.

Ned invites Tally to Thanksgiving, but she is hesitant, having previously attempted to solicit Bob. She tells Ned about her mother's suicide; she had felt invisible and, before dying, wrote that if anyone said hello to her before she reached the bridge, she wouldn't kill herself. Tally declares Ned is a caring person and that he would've seen her and said hi. Realizing that she cares about him, she accepts the dinner invite.

At Thanksgiving, Bob is clearly displeased. Rose, after learning of Tally's filmmaking talents, suggests applying to film school. Later, Bob is shocked that Rose has accepted an internship as an EMT in NYC. She says it's time for her to find her calling, as he is still waiting on the lawsuit. Rose kisses Bob goodbye before leaving.

Tally reads the Udday emails, learning that he and his friends "are confirmed to fly". She goes to pick up Ned, finding Bob there, who tells her the truth about him. Tally is unsure, but enthusiastically takes Ned to track Udday. He calls 911 to declare an Al-Qaeda attack, but she sees that Udday and his friends are there to fly model airplanes. Tally lashes out at Ned, calling him a retard and leaving just before multiple police arrive to arrest him.

Bailed out of jail (again), Ned informs Jenkins that he resigns. His depression prompts Bob to ask Jenkins to talk to him. Jenkins apologizes for lying to him and frankly explains why Ned will never be accepted into the Marines and tells him to find his purpose in life.

Ned receives postcards from his mother and Tally, who wrote to apologize. Inspired by Ned, Tally submitted the videos from the stakeout to a film school in San Francisco and received a scholarship.

Bob buys a metal detector and he and Ned search for a gold mine. They go at night to avoid being seen doing physical activity. Bob ultimately decides to drop the lawsuit, then gives fatherly advice to Ned, telling him to know his limits and set realistic goals.

Ned recalls Tally's theory that if someone could prevent suicides from jumping from the Golden Gate Bridge, in 50 years it would even out 9/11. Inspired by the story of her mother's suicide note and Tally's reading about Holden Caulfield in The Catcher in the Rye, Ned makes notecards with the phrase "HELLO, HOW ARE YOU TODAY?" and goes to the Golden Gate Bridge. He hands one of them to a woman who is evidently contemplating suicide.

== Cast ==
- Michael Angarano as Ned Chipley
- Melissa Benoist as Tally Petersen
- Alvin "Xzibit" Joiner as Master Sergeant Jenkins
- Allison Janney as Rose Chipley
- Ed O'Neill as Bob Garrity
- J. R. Ramirez as Staff Sergeant Kendrick
- Eric Christian Olsen as Thad
- Niko Nicotera as Lyle
- Nicholas Massouh as Sameer Singh
- Alexander Wraith as Ramos
- Fernando Chien as Lee
- Tom Beringer as Cliff
- Jennifer Morrison as Marie

== Release ==
The film premiered at the LA Film Festival on June 18, 2017. The film was also featured at the 2017 Austin Film Festival, SCAD Savannah Film Festival, Los Cabos International Film Festival, Cucalorus Film Festival.

In 2018, the film aired at the inaugural Mammoth Film Festival, winning the Grand Jury Prize and the awards for Best Picture, Best Director and Best Actor (Angarano). The film also won Best Narrative Feature at the 2017 SCAD Savannah Film Festival.

== Reception ==
On review aggregator Rotten Tomatoes, the film holds an approval rating of 80% based on five reviews. Sheri Linden from The Hollywood Reporter wrote: "Morrison balances her affection for all the characters with droll naturalism and an assured visual style."

Renee Schonfeld from Common Sense Media gave a positive review, writing, "Jennifer Morrison's initial feature direction is a delicate movie, honest within the constraints of its fantastical premise. It focuses on relationships, compassion, and every individual's right to live a life of purpose. Sun Dogs is gentle, heartfelt, and skilled. Working with notable actors, she brings nuance and grace to what, in lesser hands, might have been stereotypes of America's struggling working class."
