= Erwin McManus =

El Salvadoran-American author, filmmaker, and fashion designer

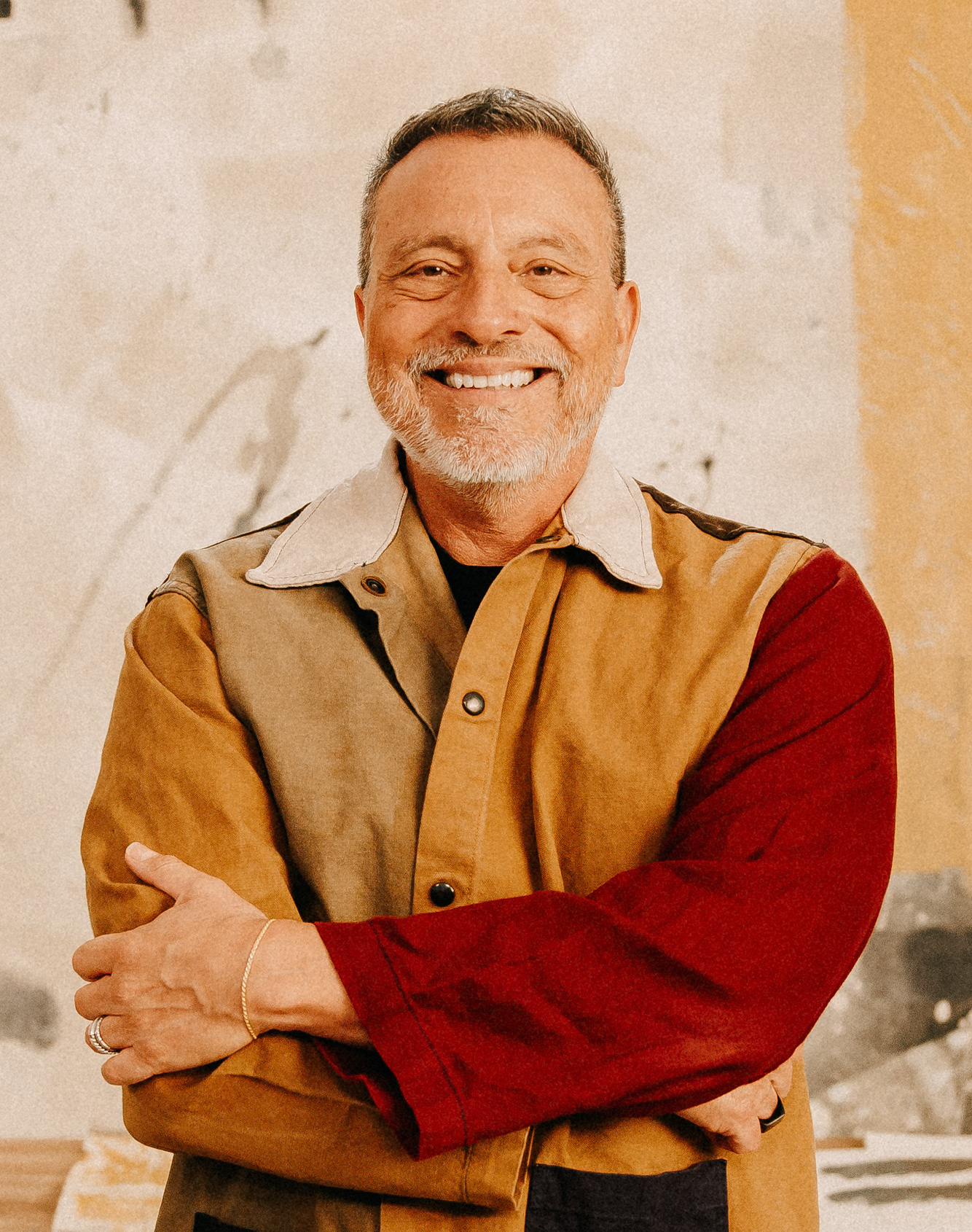
- McManus in 2021
- Born: Irving Rafael Mesa-Cardona; August 28, 1958 (age 68); San Salvador, El Salvador
- Occupations: Pastor, author, public speaker
- Website: Erwin Raphael McManus

Erwin Raphael McManus (born Irving Rafael Mesa-Cardona. August 28, 1958) is a Salvadoran-American author, filmmaker, and fashion designer. He is the lead pastor of Mosaic, a megachurch based in Los Angeles. McManus is a speaker and writer on issues related to postmodernism and postmodern Christianity.

== Early life ==
Born Irving Rafael Mesa-Cardona in San Salvador, El Salvador, McManus was raised by his grandparents for the first years of his life. They were Catholic but McManus says he attended Mass only sparingly during his childhood.

McManus, along with his brother Alex, immigrated to the United States when he was young, joining his mother. He grew up on the east coast – primarily in Miami, Florida, but also in Queens, New York, and Raleigh, North Carolina.

== Personal life ==
McManus and his wife Kim have three children.

== Christian minister ==
While working on his master's degree in Dallas/Fort Worth, McManus began two congregations while serving among the urban poor.

McManus has used psychological personality metrics in his church, such as the Myers-Briggs type indicator and Gallup's Strengths Finder. He is currently an advisor with the Awaken Group, a transformation design company.

== Motivational speaker ==
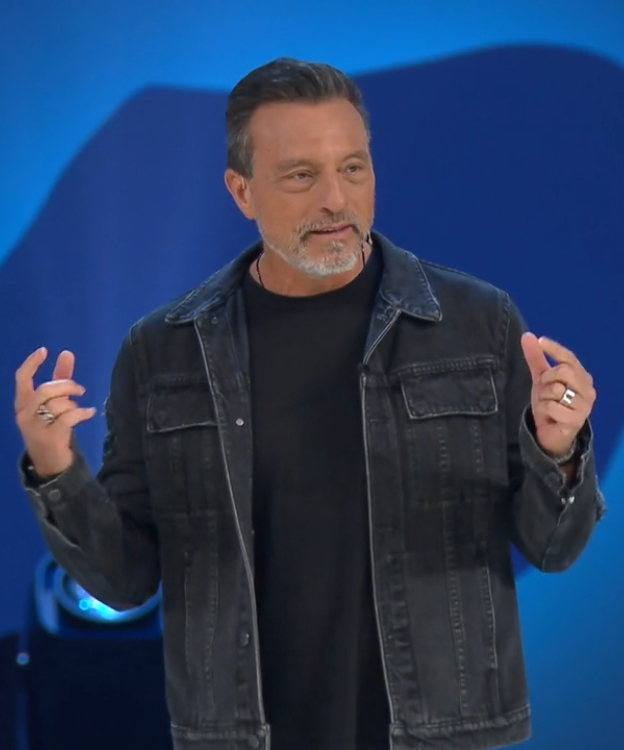
McManus speaking in July 2019

McManus is active as a motivational speaker, having been paid by Fortune 100, Fortune 500, and companies such as Nike, HYPEBEAST, Sony, Fox News, Apple, Liberty University, and TED. He speaks on topics like reinventing organizations, culture, community, equality, humanity, leadership, general motivation, futuristic ideas, inspiration, and spirituality.

== Controversies ==
=== Stance on LGBTQ and human equality ===
On May 28, 2019, McManus in HYPEBEAST said that the church he is the senior pastor and CEO of, Mosaic, are inclusive to the gay (LGBTQ) community.

"I don’t have data on this, but I'm going to guess that we probably have more people who identify themselves in the gay community at Mosaic" he adds. "And so our posture has always been we're for everybody."

On June 25, 2019, the writer of the article, Emily Jensen, updated it after several verified ex-Mosaic staff members claimed that McManus's position on the LGBTQ community is false, and that he and the church itself are anti-LGBTQ. They also claimed that McManus's leadership training spoke less of women, treated the homeless poorly, and do not allow LGBTQ members to be in church leadership positions.

McManus responded by saying, "To be clear anyone and everyone is welcome at Mosaic. Mosaic is one of the most diverse communities that exists. There are currently many people of varied race, color, ethnicity, economic status, sexual orientation, and religious beliefs who attend Mosaic."

== Works ==
McManus has written fourteen books:

- An Unstoppable Force: Daring to Become the Church God Had in Mind (ISBN 0764423061) (June 1, 2001)
- Uprising: A Revolution of the Soul (ISBN 0785264310) (September 4, 2003)
- The Church in Emerging Culture: Five Perspectives (ISBN 0310254876) (October 1, 2003) Este libro no es de MacManus, sino de Michael Horton.
- The Barbarian Way: Unleash the Untamed Faith Within (ISBN 0785264329) (February 10, 2005)
- Chasing Daylight: Seize the Power of Every Moment (ISBN 0785281134) (January 10, 2006)
- Stand Against the Wind: Fuel for the Revolution of Your Soul (ISBN 1404102965) (February 14, 2006)
- Seizing Your Divine Moment (ISBN 0785263160) (June 30, 2006)
- Soul Cravings (ISBN 0785214941) (November 14, 2006)
- Wide Awake (ISBN 078521495X) (July 1, 2008)
- The Artisan Soul: Crafting Your Life Into A Work Of Art (ISBN 0062270273) (February 25, 2014)
- The Last Arrow: Save Nothing for the Next Life (ISBN 1601429533) (September 5, 2017)
- The Way of the Warrior: An Ancient Path to Inner Peace (ISBN 1601429568) (February 26, 2019)
- The Genius of Jesus: The Man Who Changed Everything (ISBN 0593137388) (September 14, 2021)
- Mind Shift: It doesn't take a genius to think like one (ISBN 9780593137413) (October 3, 2023)

=== Filmmaker ===
Since 2004, McManus has worked as a filmmaker in multiple roles. McManus started and owned companies in both the fashion industry and film industry.

In 2013 McManus Studios and McManus shut down after investors pulled funding from the failing business. McManus took out loans to pay employees and finish contracted projects.

In 2020, McManus launched a TV show called McManus on Trinity Broadcasting Network's Hillsong Channel with his son Aaron McManus. The show includes a group of millennials discussing the "hottest, hardest topics" and current events.

=== Selected filmography ===
| Year | Title | |
|---|---|---|
| 2008 | Turnipseed | producer |
| 2008 | Wide Awake (short film series) | writer, director, producer, and actor |
| 2010 | Crave: The Documentary | writer, director, and producer |
| 2011 | A Day Without Rain | writer, director, and producer |
| 2012 | Signs (short film series) | writer, director, and producer |
| 2012 | Crave: Calgary | writer, director, and artist |
| 2013 | Interne | producer and actor |
| 2018 | Waiting for the Miracle to Come | actor |
| 2020 | McMANUS | host |
