= Gastón Pavlovich =

Mexican film producer

- Born: José Gastón Pavlovich Rodríguez; June 19, 1968 (age 58); Agua Prieta, Mexico
- Occupation: film producer

José Gastón Pavlovich Rodríguez (born June 19, 1968) is a Mexican film producer. He is the founder of Fábrica de Cine. He is of Croatian ancestry.

== Filmography ==
Producer

- El estudiante (2009) (Also story writer)
- Prijde letos Jezísek (2013)
- Silence (2016)
- Sun Dogs (2017)
- 108 Costuras (2018)
- Prometo No Enamorame (2018)
- Waiting for the Miracle to Come (2018)
- The Professor and the Madman (2019)
- The Irishman (2019)
- 91 Nights a Left to Tell Story (2019)

Executive producer

- Max Rose (2013)
- The Price of Desire (2015)
- A Hologram for the King (2016)
