= Siouzana Melikián =

Ukrainian-Mexican actress

Siouzana Melikian
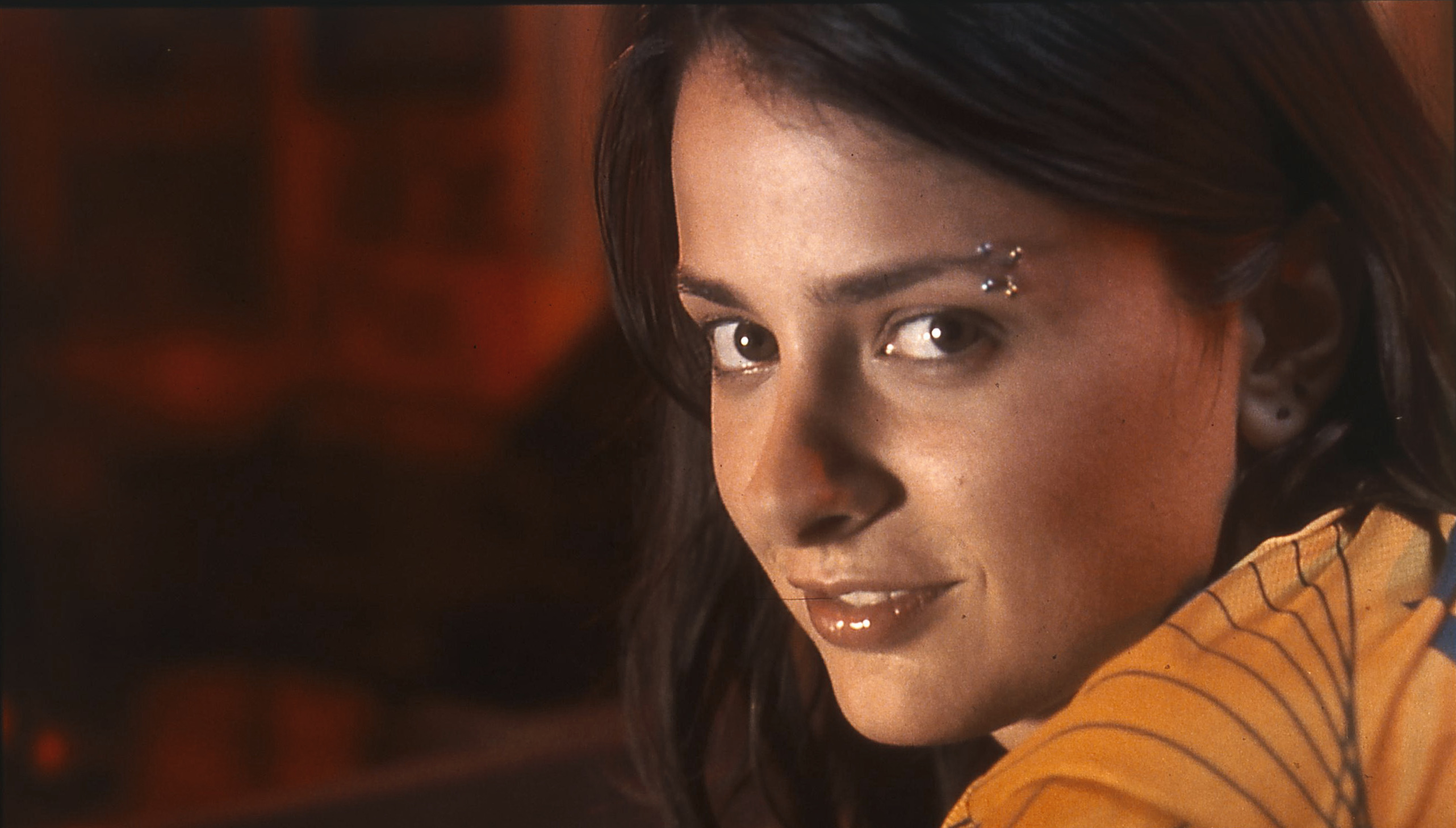
- Born: Siouzana Melikian Lizowsky; 14 August 1986 (age 39); Donetsk, Ukraine
- Other name: Siouzana Lusovskaya
- Occupation: Actress
- Years active: 2005–present

Siouzana Melikian (Spanish pronunciation: [sjuˈsana meliˈkjan]) is a Ukrainian-Mexican actress of Armenian descent.

== Biography ==
Melikian was born on 14 August 1986, into a family of circus performers in Donetsk, Ukrainian SSR, USSR. Before moving to Mexico with her family, she spent the first years of her life in Moscow, where she learned gymnastics and ballet.

Once in Mexico, Siouzana studied acting and appeared on several TV commercials. She got her first opportunity as an actress in Transit, a movie made by MTV Europe and her first starring role in El estudiante (2009).

She has performed in several Mexican films and TV series such as Capadocia. She also played a teacher in Atrevete a Soñar, a telenovela (2009).

== Filmography ==
=== Films ===
- Morgana (2012)
- El estudiante (2009)
- Cómo no te voy a querer (2008)
- Mexican Standoff (2008)
- La invención de Morel (2006)
- Transit (2005)
- A La Mala (2015)

=== TV series ===
- Nueva Vida (2013)
- El Ánima (2011)
- Gritos de muerte y libertad (2010)
- Morir en martes (2010)
- Capadocia (2008)
- Tiempo final (2008)
- Josè Josè La Serie (2016)

=== Telenovelas ===
- Atrévete a soñar (2009)
