= The Girls on the Bus =

2024 American TV series

- Genre: Political drama
- Created by: Amy Chozick & Julie Plec
- Inspired by: Chasing Hillary by Amy Chozick
- Starring: Melissa Benoist; Carla Gugino; Christina Elmore; Natasha Behnam; Brandon Scott
- Music by: Blake Neely
- Country of origin: United States
- Original language: English
- No. of seasons: 1
- No. of episodes: 10

Production
- Executive producers: Rina Mimoun; Amy Chozick; Sarah Schechter; Julie Plec; Greg Berlanti; Leigh London Redman; Jesse Peretz; Marcos Siega
- Producers: Carl Ogawa; Melissa Benoist
- Cinematography: Joe Collins; Autumn Eakin; David Tuttman
- Editors: Leigh Dodson; Harry Jierjian; Howard Leder; Erin Wolf; Jeffrey D. Brown
- Running time: 42–49 minutes
- Production companies: Berlanti Productions; Tsiporah; Warner Bros. Television

Original release
- Network: Max
- Release: March 14 – May 9, 2024

The Girls on the Bus is an American political drama television series created by Amy Chozick and Julie Plec, inspired by Chozick's 2018 memoir Chasing Hillary. It is produced by Berlanti Television, My So Called Company, and Warner Bros. Television Studios, and it premiered on Max on March 14, 2024. In May 2024, the series was canceled after one season.

== Premise ==
The Girls on the Bus chronicles four female journalists who follow every move of a parade of flawed presidential candidates, while finding friendship, love, and scandal along the way.

== Cast ==
=== Main ===
- Melissa Benoist as Sadie McCarthy, a journalist for The New York Sentinel
- Carla Gugino as Grace Gordon Greene, an experienced journalist who has been in the bus for a long time
- Christina Elmore as Kimberlyn Anaya Kendrick, a reporter for a conservative network called "Liberty News Direct"
- Natasha Behnam as Lola Rahaii, a Gen Z reporter who is also an influencer and activist
- Brandon Scott as Malcolm

=== Recurring ===
- Griffin Dunne as Bruce Turner (Note: Griffin Dunne is credited as "Special Guest Star" but is a recurring cast member.)
- Hettienne Park as Felicity Walker
- Mark Consuelos as Biff de la Peña
- Scott Cohen as Charlie
- Kyle Vincent Terry as Eric Jordan
- P.J. Sosko as Hunter S. Thompson
- Tala Ashe as Althea Abdi
- Rose Jackson Smith as Annie
- Leslie Fray as Nellie Carmichael
- Scott Foley as Hayden Wells Garrett
- Adam Kaplan as Gary
- Terry Hu as Josie
- BD Wong as Declan Morales
- Peter Jacobson as Benji Newman

== Episodes ==
| No. | Title | Directed by | Written by | Original release date | Prod. code |
|---|---|---|---|---|---|
| 1 | "Pilot" | Jesse Peretz | Television story by : Amy Chozick & Julie Plec; Teleplay by : Amy Chozick & Julie Plec | March 14, 2024 | T64.10201 |
| 2 | "She's with Her" | Marta Cunningham | Rina Mimoun | March 14, 2024 | T64.10202 |
| 3 | "The Audacity of Nope" | Marcos Siega | Amy Chozick | March 21, 2024 | T64.10203 |
| 4 | "Two Americas" | Maggie Carey | Jenna Richman | March 28, 2024 | T64.10204 |
| 5 | "Everything Is Copy" | Marcos Siega | Candace Jackson & Amy Chozick | April 4, 2024 | T64.10205 |
| 6 | "The Debate" | Erica Dunton | Kevin A. Garnett | April 11, 2024 | T64.10206 |
| 7 | "She Was Against It, Before She Was For It" | DeMane Davis | Tawal Panyacosit Jr. | April 18, 2024 | T64.10207 |
| 8 | "Life Is a Highway" | Kyra Sedgwick | Tim Stack & Rina Mimoun | April 25, 2024 | T64.10208 |
| 9 | "Slouching Towards Brooklyn" | Marcos Siega | Jenna Richman & Kevin A. Garnett | May 2, 2024 | T64.10209 |
| 10 | "The Everydays" | Erica Dunton | Amy Chozick | May 9, 2024 | T64.10210 |

== Production ==
The series first began development in August 2019 at Netflix, inspired by the novel Chasing Hillary by Amy Chozick, who created the series with Julie Plec. However, by September 2021, Netflix had dropped the series, which would then move over to The CW and receive a rework by Chozick and Plec. The series would again change networks in February 2022 to HBO Max, where it was issued a series order. Melissa Benoist would enter negotiations to star in the series that same month as well as serve as a producer. In June, Rina Mimoun joined the series to serve as showrunner, while Benoist would be confirmed to participate in the series and Natasha Behnam was cast. In July, Christina Elmore joined the cast. The following month, Brandon Scott was added to the main cast, while Scott Foley and Griffin Dunne were among several additions to the recurring cast. CNN anchor Abby Phillip would also join the production to serve as a consultant. In September, Carla Gugino would join in a lead role, and Mark Consuelos would join in a recurring role in October.

Production on the series had begun by October 1, 2022, when Chozick announced on Instagram that filming had wrapped on the pilot episode. On May 24, 2024, Max canceled the series after one season.

== Release ==
The series premiered on March 14, 2024, launching with its first two episodes, followed by a new episode every week until May 9 on Max.

== Reception ==
The review aggregator website Rotten Tomatoes reported a 55% approval rating with an average rating of 6.4/10, based on 20 critic reviews. The website's critics consensus reads, "The Girls on the Bus goes round and round a fictionalized campaign trail with high drama and ideals to spare, although it swerves bumpily between its frothy and civic-minded lanes." Metacritic assigned a score of 64 out of 100 based on 12 critics, indicating "generally favorable reviews".
