= Amy Chozick =

American political reporter

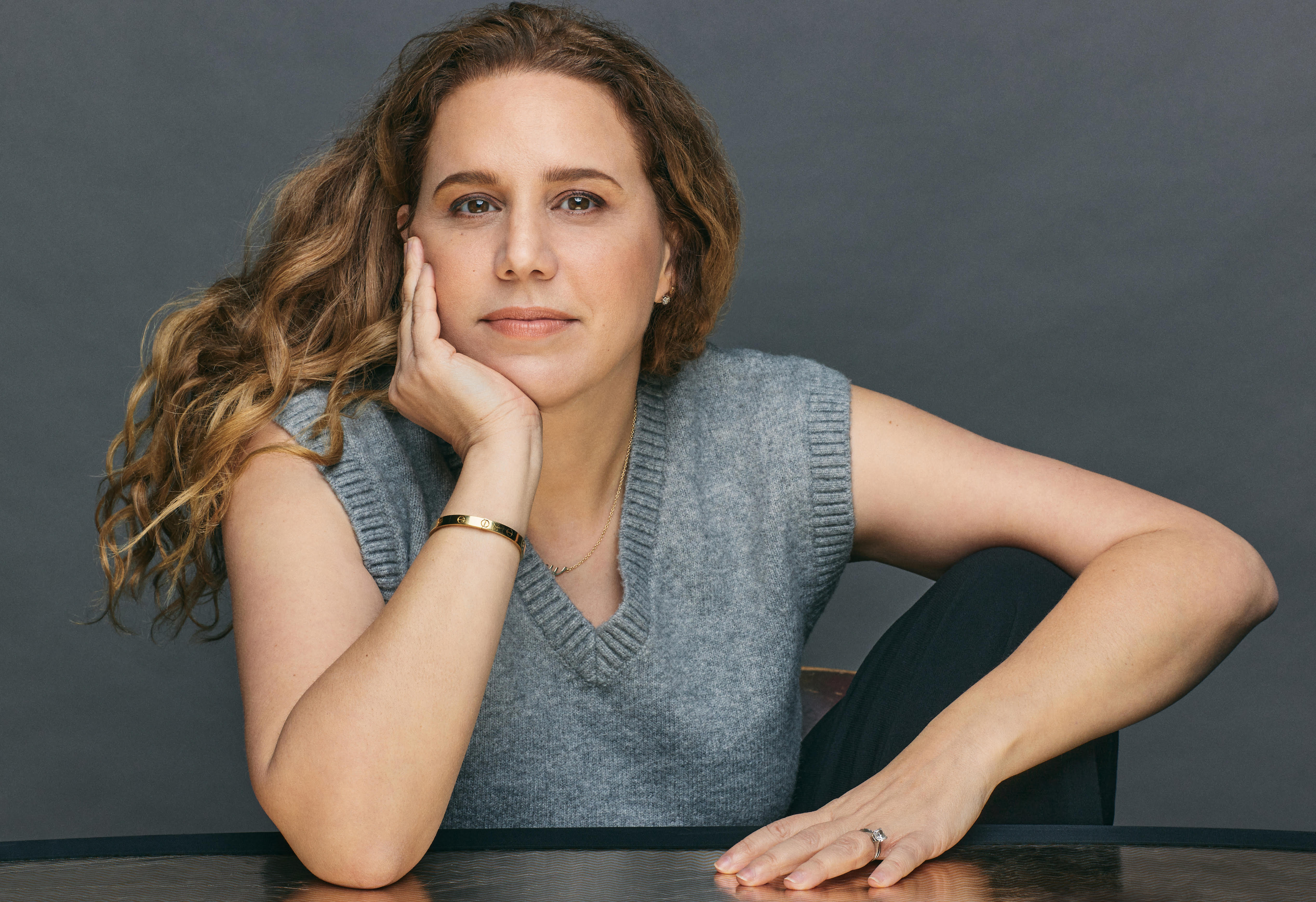
- Amy Chozick in 2024
- Born: 1979 or 1980 (age 46–47)
- Education: The University of Texas at Austin
- Occupation: Political journalist
- Spouse: Robert Ennis
- Children: 1

Amy Chozick (born 1979 or 1980) is an American journalist, author, and screenwriter. She has worked as a reporter for The Wall Street Journal and The New York Times, and is the author of Chasing Hillary, a memoir about covering Hillary Clinton's 2016 presidential campaign. Chozick adapted the book into the HBO Max series The Girls on the Bus. She has also written for publications such as Vanity Fair and Vogue.

== Early life and education ==
Chozick grew up in a Jewish family in San Antonio, Texas, where she began working in journalism writing for the San Antonio Express-News as part of a program offering school credit for working off campus. She attended Tom C. Clark High School, then the University of Texas at Austin, where she was originally a journalism major, but switched to English and Latin American studies after three weeks.

== Career ==
Chozick began her career at The Wall Street Journal, where she served as a foreign correspondent based in Tokyo and a political reporter covering the 2008 presidential campaigns of Hillary Clinton and Barack Obama. After eight years at the Journal, she joined The New York Times in 2011, first reporting on corporate media before moving to the politics team in 2013. At the Times, she became a national political reporter and was a lead correspondent covering Hillary Clinton's 2016 presidential campaign.

In 2012, she accompanied President Bill Clinton on a philanthropic trip to Africa. Chozick has also written for Vogue, including profiles of Stormy Daniels and all of the women running for president in 2020.

In 2015, then-presidential candidate Donald Trump referred to her as a "third-rate reporter".

In 2016, she said that as a result of her reporting on Clinton, specifically on her clinching the Democratic nomination for president in June of that year, that she had received death threats from supporters of Clinton's rival in this campaign, Bernie Sanders.

In 2018, Chozick published Chasing Hillary, a memoir about covering Clinton's campaigns. The book, which the Times called "The Devil Wears Prada meets The Boys on the Bus," became a bestseller. Chozick and Julie Plec adapted the book as a television series called The Girls on the Bus.

In 2023, Chozick got an exclusive interview with Elizabeth Holmes for The New York Times shortly before Holmes began her prison sentence. The profile drew mixed responses from media commentators. A quote from the interview, regarding Holmes' public persona, was a major topic in the documentary You Can See Everything. Holmes and her boyfriend Billy Evans both disputed the accuracy of the quote. At the end of the film, and following its release, Chozick stood by the accuracy of the interview. However, she admitted that while her editor had verified the notebook in 2023, she no longer had it with her.

In November 2024, it was announced that she will be writing a Netflix series that will star Meghann Fahy and will be produced by Chernin Entertainment.

Chozick's debut novel With Friends Like You was released on July 21, 2026. Chozick is adapting the novel into a movie with Fifth Season and producer Brad Weston.

== Personal life ==
Chozick lives in Los Angeles with her husband, Robert Ennis, and their son, born in 2018.

== Works ==
=== Bibliography ===
- Chasing Hillary: Ten Years, Two Presidential Campaigns, and One Intact Glass Ceiling, Harper, 2018, ISBN 978-0062413598
- With Friends Like You, Diversified Publishing, 2026. ISBN 9798217349319

=== Filmography ===
- The Girls on the Bus
- MORE (pilot, HBO Max, Creator/Executive Producer)
- House of Cards (Netflix, Consultant)

=== Select articles ===
- Liz Holmes Wants You to Forget About Elizabeth, New York Times, May 7, 2023. The article was referenced in the 2026 documentary film You Can See Everything.
- Los Angeles Is Being Crushed Under the Weight of Inaction, New York Times, January 13, 2025. Description: An opinion piece criticizing California's leadership for their lack of response to the fire.
- Chozick, Amy (2026-04-11), Someone Has to Be Happy. Why Not Lauren Sánchez Bezos?, ISSN 0362-4331
