= Mosaic (church) =

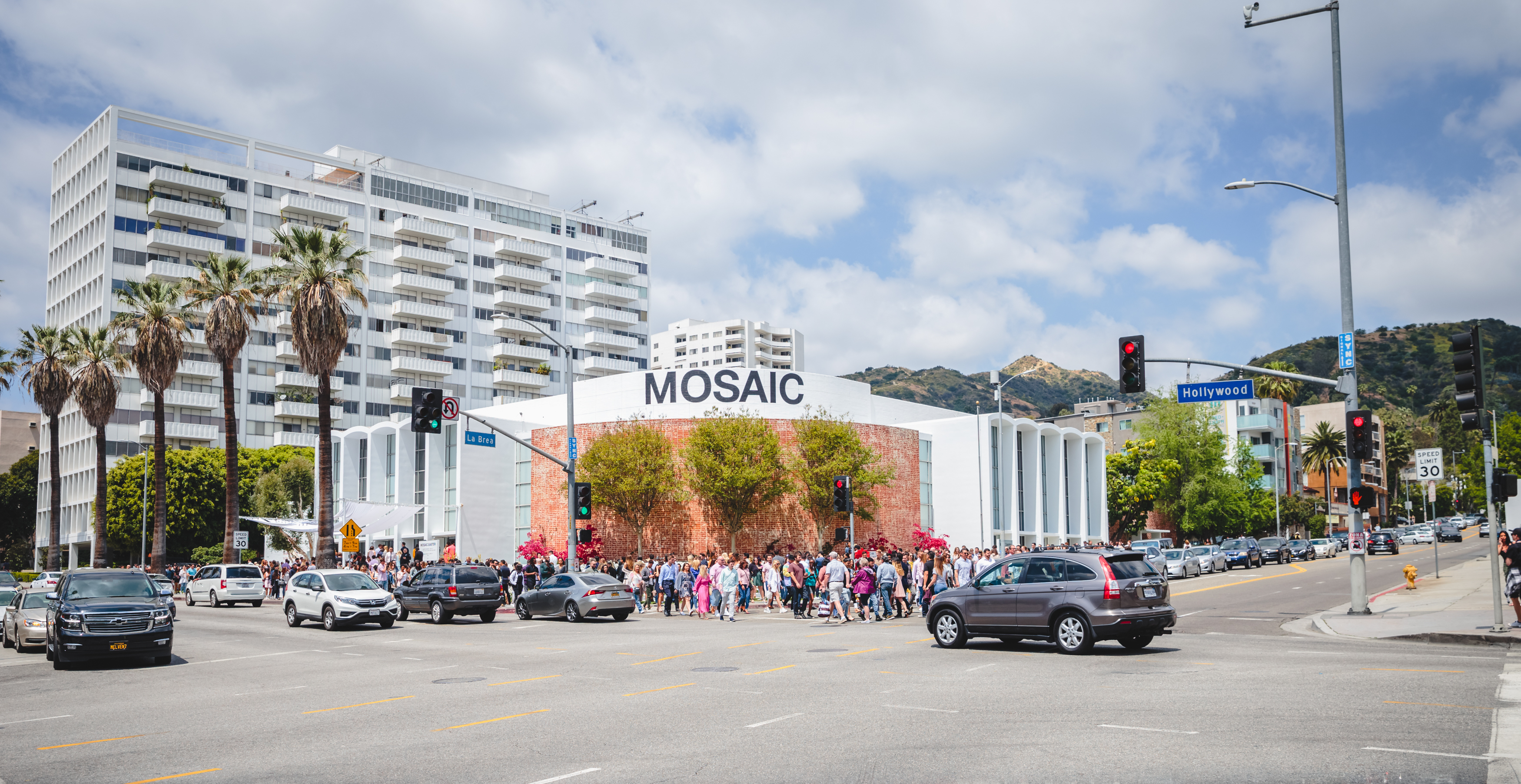
- Country: United States and Mexico
- Denomination: Non-denominational
- Website: www.mosaic.org

History
- Founded: 1943

Mosaic is a multi-site Christian megachurch based in Los Angeles, California, and is currently led by Erwin McManus. The church had been affiliated with the Southern Baptist Convention, but today, it describes itself as non-denominational.

== History ==
On January 3, 1943, thirty-five charter members of Bethel Baptist Church began meeting in a rented storefront at Brady Avenue, Los Angeles, California. Members brought their own chairs to the first service. By 1958, two more "missions" or services were established in Baldwin Park and Monterey Park.

In 1969, at the age of 24, Thomas A. Wolf ("Brother Tom") became the senior pastor of the then-named First Southern Baptist Church of East Los Angeles. At that time, the small number of people still attending were predominantly Caucasian/Anglo and elderly in an area that was becoming more diverse with Hispanic, Armenian, and Asian families moving into the locality. The churches' new make-up was approximately 50% Hispanic, 40% white, and 10% Asian. Wolf created a leadership team that reflected this new cultural make-up with Hispanics filling over 50% of elder and leadership roles and Asians serving approximately 20% of these roles.

Wolf introduced a practice called "Oikos Evangelism", reaching out to one's circle of influence; home church groups or "Share Groups".

By 1983 the original building on Brady Avenue was growing and the building was extended in 1987. At this time Wolf developed a training program and "LA Tour" which pointed out the mosaic quality of diverse populations of LA, rather than the "melting pot" concept that many media sources used to describe the city. This "mosaic" terminology later became central to the re-naming of the congregation.

== Modern Era ==
In October 1991, Erwin McManus was first introduced to The Church on Brady as the keynote speaker at Brady's Spare-Not Conference on World Evangelism. He was then invited to move to LA and become Senior Pastor of the church and he did so in early 1994. Wolf then moved into the role of "Teaching Pastor" and simultaneously accepted a teaching position at Golden Gate Seminary in San Francisco.

At this time McManus made several changes at Brady church, starting with promoting the use of multi-media, art and dance in worship.

A new name was sought for the church and "MOSAIC" became the accepted choice. Regular night-time services began to be offered and these were moved to the Club Soho, a nightclub in downtown Los Angeles (relocating several years later to the Mayan Theater, also in downtown LA). MOSAIC has since become a single church with multiple sites.

In 2006, Mosaic had approximately 2,000 people attending weekly, from 60 different nationalities. By 2019, they had expanded to 7 campuses along the Pacific Coast and has a weekly attendance of over 5,000.

== Campuses ==
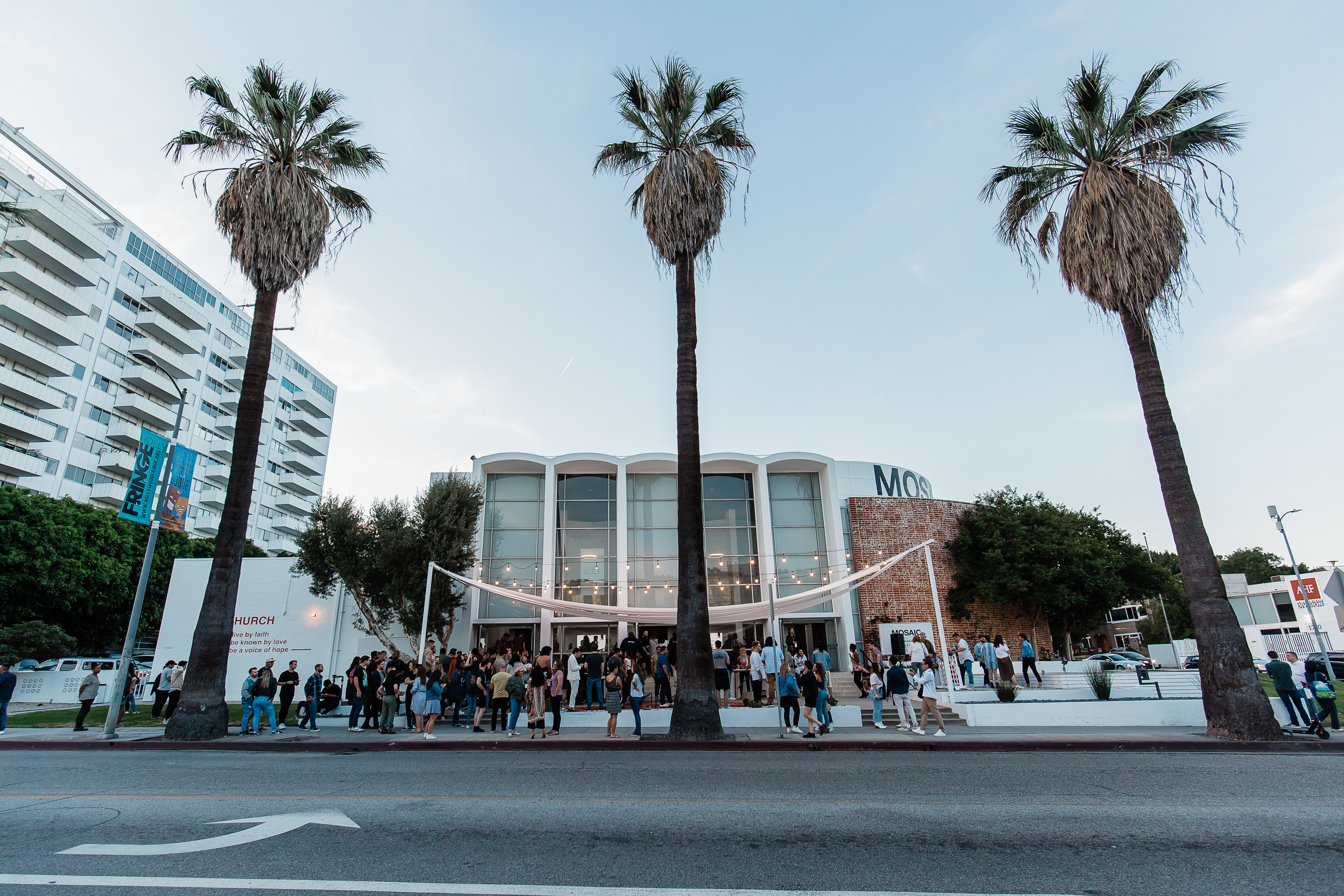
Mosaic Hollywood

Mosaic Hollywood launched in 2011 at the former Fifth Church of Christ, Scientist building. The 1959 structure is located at the intersection of Hollywood Boulevard and La Brea Avenue and has been designated a Los Angeles Historic-Cultural Monument.

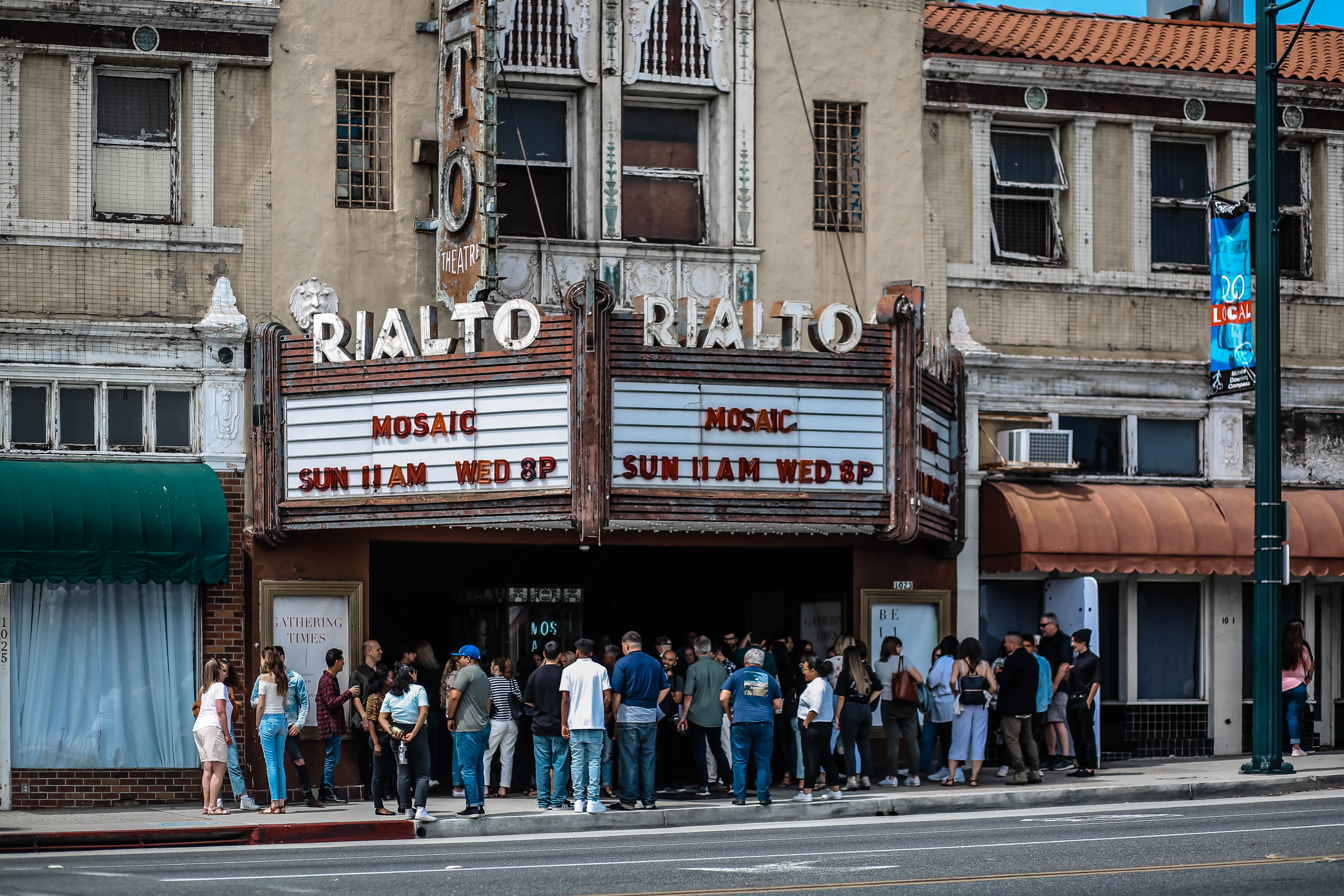
Mosaic South Pasadena

Mosaic South Pasadena launched in 2017 in the historic Rialto Theatre, with a lease agreement running until 2039.

Mosaic Venice was launched in 2017.

Mosaic Orange County and Mosaic Mexico City were launched in 2018.

Mosaic Seattle was launched in 2019.

Mosaic Ecuador was launched in 2020.

== Media ==
Mosaic has a worship band named Mosaic MSC, led by Worship Pastor Mariah McManus. The band has released three live albums and three EPs.

The church also produces the Battle Ready podcast, hosted by Erwin and Aaron McManus.

They also host McManus, a current affairs TV show.

== Advocacy ==
Mosaic has advocated for refugees, both in the US and globally. World Vision International listed McManus, as one of the top 25 mission-minded church leaders. On April 29, 2019, CCM Magazine released an article, mentioning Mosaic's involvement abroad.

== Beliefs on the LGBT+ community ==
On May 28, 2019, the online magazine Hypebeast which quoted McManus as having a large gay attendance and being "for everybody". On June 25, 2019, the article was updated after several former members disputed McManus's comment. McManus responded with a statement describing the church's community as diverse.

On July 13, 2019, Refinery29 published an article that described megachurches in general as being image-obsession and claiming to have "open doors" while also being unwelcoming to members of the LGBTQ+ community. One former Mosaic attendee said that openly gay people were denied leadership positions due to their homosexuality.

ChurchClarity.org rates the congregation as having a "non-clear/non-affirming" policy towards the inclusion of LGBTQ members in the church.
