= Waiting for the Miracle to Come =

2018 fantasy drama film

- Directed by: Lian Lunson
- Written by: Lian Lunson
- Produced by: Lian Lunson; Terence Berry; Dale A. Brown; Molly M. Mayeux; Gastón Pavlovich; Tyler Zacharia
- Starring: Sophie Lowe; Charlotte Rampling; Willie Nelson; Waylon Payne; Todd Terry; Erwin Raphael McManus; Sile Bermingham
- Cinematography: Kimberly Culotta
- Edited by: Melanie Annan
- Music by: Ryan Beveridge
- Production company: Spotlight Pictures
- Release dates: 27 October 2018 (Austin Film Festival); 29 April 2019 (DVD & VOD)
- Running time: 75 minutes
- Country: United States
- Language: English

Waiting for the Miracle to Come is a 2018 fantasy drama film written and directed by Lian Lunson, and stars Sophie Lowe, Charlotte Rampling, and Willie Nelson.

== Plot ==
A young woman receives a letter after her father's death. The content, encrypted in enigmatic words, serves as a guide for her on a journey into the past. Eventually, she makes a discovery that changes her family forever.

== Cast ==
- Sophie Lowe as Adeline Winter
- Charlotte Rampling as Dixie Riggs
- Willie Nelson as Jimmy Riggs
- Waylon Payne as Shooter Jones
- Todd Terry as Jack Winter
- Erwin Raphael McManus as Father Carlos Romero
- Sile Bermingham as Betty Winter

== Production ==
=== Filming ===
Filming took place at various locations in the Austin, Texas area and a preserved film set on Nelson's ranch in Spicewood, Texas.

== Soundtrack ==
Bono of U2 wrote a song for the film titled "Where the Shadows Fall," with Nelson performing the vocals.

== Reception ==
Joe Leydon of Variety praised Rampling and Nelson's chemistry together and acting, and said, "... it’s entirely possible that many impatient viewers will give up on “Waiting for the Miracle to Come” after the first 20 minutes or so. It is equally possible, however, that Lunson will get you on her wavelength, and you’ll be sufficiently enthralled to complete the journey with her." Barbara Shulgasser of Common Sense Media gave the film 2/5 stars, and called it an, "Offbeat, but mundane drama...," criticizing the plot structure and character development, but praised Rampling's performance. Sam K. of Dove.org said, "Sometimes the film is confusing or frustrating...," but called it, "a truly unique experience."
