= Finn (given name) =

Finn is a masculine given name. The name has several origins. In some cases it is derived from the Old Norse personal name and byname Finnr, meaning "Sámi" or "Finn". In some cases the Old Norse name was a short form of other names composed with this element (Thorfinn). In other cases, the name Finn is derived from the Irish Fionn, meaning "white" or "fair". One of the related given names through Finnr is Finnur.

It is rarely used as a female given name.

== Given name ==
- Finn (2009–2023), English police dog
- The Finn (1912–1925), American-bred Thoroughbred racehorse
- Finn Aabye (born 1953), Danish film producer
- Finn Aamodt (born 1952), Norwegian sports coach
- Finn Amundsen (1897–1958), Norwegian sports journalist
- Finn Anderson (born 1990), Danish-German professional Counter-Strike 2 player
- Finn Andrews (born 1983), British-New Zealand musician and singer-songwriter
- Finn Árnasson (died c. 1065), Norwegian nobleman and advisor
- Finn Arnestad (1915–1994), Norwegian composer and musician
- Finn Atkins (born 1989), British actor
- Finn Azaz (born 2000), Irish-Israeli footballer
- Finn Bálor (born 1981), Irish professional wrestler
- Finn Ole Becker (born 2000), German footballer
- Finn Bell (born 2004), English footballer
- Finn Benestad (1929–2012), Norwegian musicologist and music critic
- Finn Bennett (born 1999), British actor
- Finn Bergstrand (born 1932), Swedish diplomat
- Finn Bilous (born 1999), New Zealand freestyle skier
- Finn Bjelke (born 1959), Norwegian journalist
- Finn Borchgrevink (born 1959), Norwegian sprint canoer
- Finn van Breemen (born 2003), Dutch footballer
- Finn Butcher (born 1995), New Zealand slalom canoeist
- Finn Carnduff (born 2004), English rugby union player
- Finn Carter (born 1960), American actress
- Finn M. W. Caspersen (1941–2009), American financier
- Finn Christensen (born 1962), Danish footballer
- Finn Christensen (1920–2009), Norwegian painter and graphic artist
- Finn Thunbo Christensen (born 1951), Danish sailor
- Finn Cole (born 1995), English actor
- Finn Coren (born 1961), Norwegian singer-songwriter and multi-instrumentalist
- Finn Crockett (born 1999), Irish cyclist
- Finn Cousin-Dawson (born 2002), English footballer
- Finn Dahmen (born 1998), German footballer
- Finn Delany (born 1995), New Zealand basketball player
- Finn Delap (born 2005), English footballer
- Finn Devold (1902–1977), Norwegian explorer and marine biologist
- Finn Dicke (born 2004), Dutch footballer
- Finn Døssing (1941–2022), Danish footballer
- Finn Ecrepont (born 2002), Scottish footballer
- Finn Ferner (1920–2001), Norwegian sailor
- Finn Fisher-Black (born 2001), New Zealand road cyclist
- Finn Flanagan (born 2005), English association football player
- Finn Florijn (born 1999), Dutch rower
- Finn Fuglestad (born 1942), Norwegian historian
- Finn Gehrsitz (born 2004), German racing driver
- Finn Geipel (born 1958), German architect and urbanist
- Finn Graff (born 1938), Norwegian illustrator
- Finn Graham (born 1996), Scottish footballer
- Finn Olav Gundelach (1925–1981), Danish diplomat
- Finn Gustavsen (1926–2005), Norwegian politician
- Finn Guttormsen (born 1968), Norwegian Jazz musician
- Finn Halvorsen (born 1947), Norwegian ski jumper
- Finnegan "Finn" Harries, YouTuber on the YouTube channel JacksGap
- Finn Haunstoft (1928–2008), Danish canoeist
- Finn Hawkins (born 2002), British windsurfer
- Finn Hiorthøy (1903–1991), Norwegian judge
- Finn Hodt (1919–2016), Norwegian speed skater
- Finn Hødnebø (1919–2007), Norwegian philologist and lexicographer
- Finn Høffding (1899–1997), Danish composer
- Finn Hösch (born 2003), German ski mountaineer
- Finn Hurley (born 2003), New Zealand rugby union player
- Finn Hvistendahl (born 1942), Norwegian businessperson
- Finn Iles (born 1999), Canadian mountain bike racer
- Finn Isaksen (1924–1987), Norwegian politician
- Finn Iunker (born 1969), Norwegian playwright
- Finn Christian Jagge (1966–2020), Norwegian alpine skier
- Finn Jebsen (born 1950), Norwegian businessperson
- Finn Jeltsch (born 2006), German footballer
- Finn Jensen (1957/58–2007), Danish darts player
- Finn Jensen (born 1957), Danish speedway rider
- Finn Jensen (1914–1987), Danish swimmer
- Finn Johannesson (1943–2024), Swedish gymnast
- Finn Arne Johansen, Norwegian handball player
- Finn Jones (born 1988), English actor
- Finn Jor (born 1929), Norwegian journalist and writer
- Finn Juhl (1912–1989), Danish architect and industrial designer
- Finn Kalvik (born 1947), Norwegian singer and composer
- Finn Karlsen (born 1952), Greenlandic politician
- Finn Keane, British songwriter and record producer
- Finn Kjelstrup (1884–1961), Norwegian civil servant
- Finn Knutsen (1932–2021), Norwegian politician
- Finn Kobberø (1936–2009), Danish badminton player
- Finn Hågen Krogh (born 1990), Norwegian cross-country skier
- Finn Krokeide (born 1986), Norwegian politician
- Finn E. Kydland (born 1943), Norwegian economist
- Finn Laudrup (born 1945), Danish international footballer
- Finn Lambrechts (1900–1956), Norwegian military officer
- Finn Lau (born 1993), Hong Kong activist
- Finn Lemke (born 1992), German handball player
- Finn Lied (1916–2014), Norwegian politician
- Finn Lowery (1990–2019), New Zealand water polo player
- Finn Lynch (born 1996), Irish sailor
- Finn Lynggaard (1930–2011), Danish artist
- Finn Mackay (born 1976 or 1977), British sociologist and feminist
- Finn Maginness (born 2001), Australian rules footballer
- Finn Malmgren (1895–c.1928), Swedish meteorologist and Arctic explorer
- Finn McGeever (born 2000), Irish swimmer
- Finn McKenty (born 1978), American marketing strategist
- Finn Mittet (1933–2004), Danish footballer
- Finn Mortensen (1922–1983), Norwegian composer, critic and educator
- Finn Münster (1887–1965), Norwegian gymnast
- Finn Murphy (born 1958), American long haul trucker and author
- Finn Nagell (1899–1977), Norwegian military officer, Milorg pioneer, economist and businessperson
- Finn Nørbygaard (born 1952), Danish actor, entertainer, musician and psychotherapist
- Finn Nørgaard (1959–2015), Danish filmmaker
- Finn Nygaard (born 1955), Danish graphic designer
- Finn Øen (1902–1979), Norwegian businessperson and politician
- Finn O'Mara (born 1999), English footballer
- Finn Palmstrøm (1903–1987), Norwegian jurist
- Finn Pedersen (1925–2012), Danish Olympic rower
- Finn Peters, flautist and saxophonist
- Finn Porath (born 1997), German footballer
- Finn Qvale (1873–1955), Norwegian military officer, cartographer, and sports official
- Finn Rausing (born 1954), Swedish billionaire heir and businessman
- Finn Reynolds (born 2000), New Zealand tennis player
- Finn Ronne (1899–1980), Norwegian Antarctic explorer
- Finn Russell (born 1992), British rugby union player
- Finn Jarle Sæle (born 1947), Norwegian newspaper editor, activist, theologian and former priest
- Finn Salomonsen (1909–1983), Danish ornithologist
- Finn Schiander (1889–1967), Norwegian sailor
- Finn Seemann (1944–1985), Norwegian footballer
- Finn Skårderud (born 1956), Norwegian psychiatrist
- Finn Sonnekalb (born 2007), German speed skater
- Finn Stam (born 2003), Dutch footballer
- Finn Stokkers (born 1996), Dutch footballer
- Finn Støren (1893–1962), Norwegian businessperson and civil servant
- Finn Sullivan, American basketball player
- Finn Surman (born 2003), New Zealand professional footballer
- Finn Tapp (born 1999), English footballer and television personality
- Finn Tarp (born 1951), Danish professor and researcher
- Finn Taylor (born 1958), American-Norwegian screenwriter and director
- Finn Theobald-Thomas (born 2003), English rugby union player
- Finn Thorsen (born 1940), Norwegian footballer and manager
- Finn Tugwell (born 1976), Danish table tennis player
- Finn Urdal (born 1944), Norwegian handball player
- Finn Vådahl (born 1950), Norwegian footballer
- Finn Viderø (1906–1987), Danish organist
- Finn Wagle (1941–2026), Norwegian theologian and bishop in the Church of Norway
- Finn Wentworth (born 1958), American entrepreneur and philanthropist
- Finn Wiberg (born 1943), Danish football manager and player
- Finn Wiebelhaus (born 2006), German racing driver
- Finn Wirlmann (born 1996), German footballer
- Finn Wischmann (1918–2011), Norwegian botanist
- Finn Wittrock (born 1984), American actor
- Finn Wolfhard (born 2002), Canadian actor and musician

== As a nickname ==
- F1NN5TER (born 2000), video game streamer

== Fictional characters ==
- Finn, a character from the Star Wars sequel trilogy
- Finn, a character from the British Channel 4 science fiction comedy-drama, Misfits
- Finn, a character from the British fortnightly anthology comic, Crisis
- Finn the Human, a main character from the American animated television series, Adventure Time
- Finn Hudson, a main character in the Fox musical comedy television series Glee
- Finn DeTrolio, a character and former lover of Meadow Soprano on The Sopranos
- Finn Kelly, a character from the Australian soap opera, Neighbours
- Finn Larsen, a character from the 2024 American romantic sports film, Challengers
- Finn Shelby, a main character from the British period crime drama television series, Peaky Blinders
- Finn Warner, a character on the New Zealand soap opera, Shortland Street
- Finn, a character from the 2021 animated fantasy series, Arcane
- Finn, a character from The Lego Movie franchise
- Finn Abernathy, a character from the American crime procedural drama TV series, Bones
- Finn McCool or MacCool (Fionn mac Cumhaill), hero in Irish mythology
  - protagonist of the 1994 Finn Mac Cool by Morgan Llywelyn
- Finn McMissile (Cars 2) by Pixar
- Finn, a character from the Canadian animated television series, Storm Hawks
- Finn Finnegan, a character from American romantic action comedy film, Fool's Gold
- Finnick (in The Hunger Games) is called Finn sometimes, story by Suzanne Collins
