= Finn Christensen =

Finn Christensen may refer to:

- Finn Christensen (footballer)
- Finn Christensen (artist)
- Finn Thunbo Christensen, Danish sailor
