= List of awards and nominations received by Glee =

Glee awards and nominations
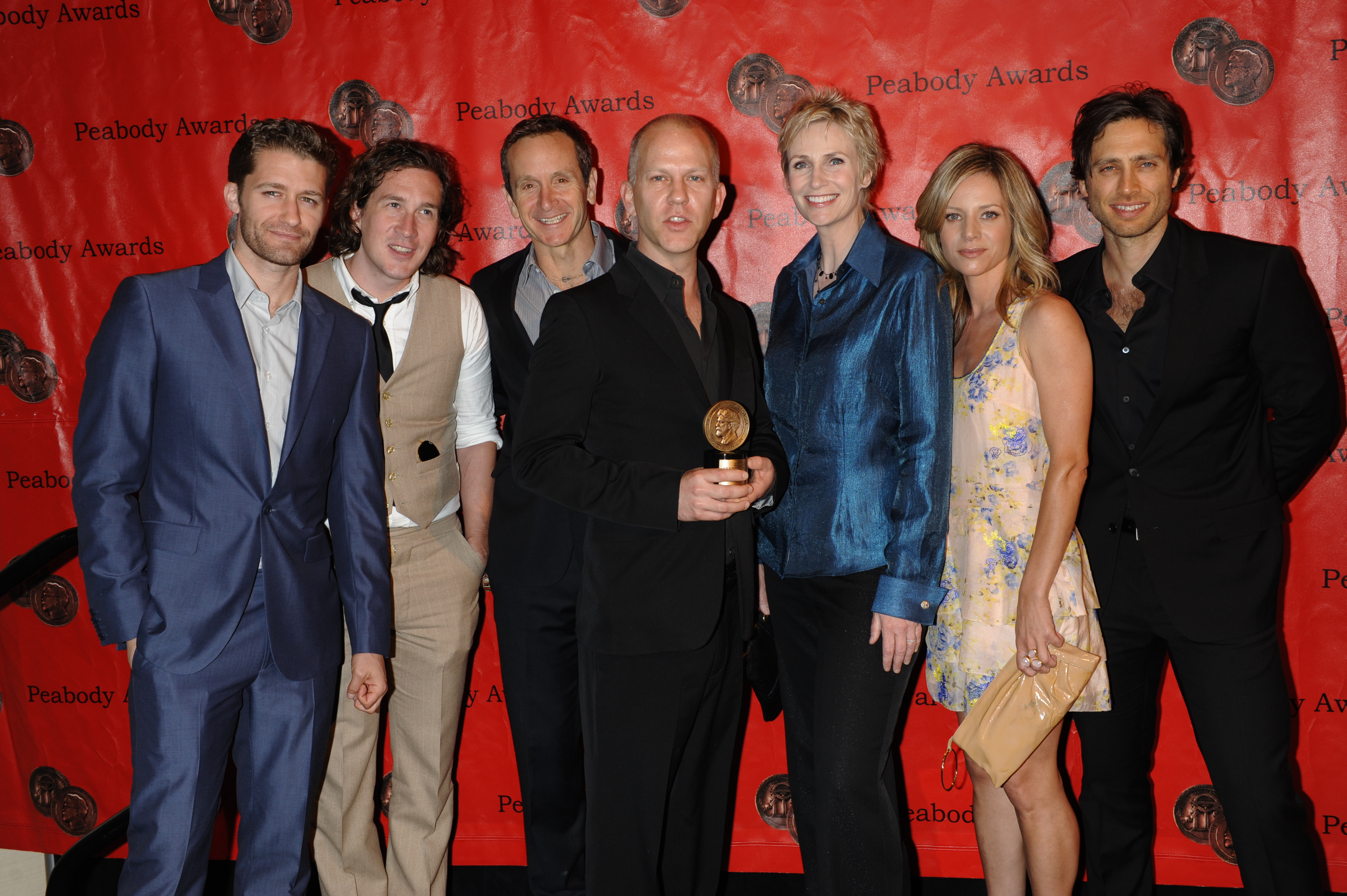
- The cast and crew of Glee at the Peabody Awards in 2010
Awards and nominations
| Award | Wins | Nominations |
| ACE Eddie Awards | 0 | 1 |
| Art Directors Guild Awards | 0 | 1 |
| AfterEllen.com and AfterElton.com Awards | 11 | 17 |
| ALMA Awards | 1 | 2 |
| American Film Institute Awards | 2 | 2 |
| American Music Awards | 1 | 1 |
| Artios Awards | 1 | 1 |
| BAFTA Awards | 0 | 2 |
| Brit Awards | 0 | 1 |
| Cinema Audio Society Awards | 0 | 2 |
| The Comedy Awards | 0 | 1 |
| Costume Designers Guild Awards | 2 | 3 |
| Critics' Choice Television Awards | 0 | 2 |
| Directors Guild of America Awards | 0 | 3 |
| Diversity Awards | 1 | 1 |
| Dorian Awards | 9 | 9 |
| Primetime Emmy Awards | 4 | 17 |
| Creative Arts Emmy Awards | 2 | 15 |
| Do Something Awards | 2 | 2 |
| GLAAD Media Awards | 2 | 4 |
| Golden Globe Awards | 4 | 10 |
| Golden Reel Awards | 2 | 3 |
| Grammy Awards | 0 | 3 |
| Hollywood Music in Media Awards | 1 | 1 |
| HPA Awards | 0 | 4 |
| Imagen Awards | 0 | 1 |
| Just for Laughs Awards | 1 | 1 |
| Media Access Awards | 1 | 1 |
| NAACP Image Awards | 0 | 4 |
| National Television Awards | 0 | 1 |
| Nickelodeon Australian Kids' Choice Awards | 0 | 2 |
| Peabody Awards | 1 | 1 |
| People's Choice Awards | 4 | 13 |
| Producers Guild of America Awards | 0 | 2 |
| PRISM Awards | 0 | 1 |
| Satellite Awards | 5 | 11 |
| Screen Actors Guild Awards | 1 | 5 |
| SOC Lifetime Achievement Awards | 0 | 1 |
| Teen Choice Awards | 14 | 30 |
| Television Critics Association Awards | 3 | 4 |
| Television Academy Honors | 1 | 1 |
| TV Choice Awards | 1 | 1 |
| TV Land Awards | 1 | 1 |
| WIN Awards | 1 | 3 |
| Writers Guild of America Awards | 0 | 3 |

Totals (Note: Certain award groups do not simply award one winner. They acknowledge several different recipients, have runners-up, and have third place. Since this is a specific recognition and is different from losing an award, runner-up mentions are considered wins in this award tally. For simplification and to avoid errors, each award in this list has been presumed to have had a prior nomination.)
- Wins: 78
- Nominations: 194

Glee is an American musical comedy-drama television series that aired on Fox from May 19, 2009, to March 20, 2015. It was nominated for a variety of different awards including thirty-two Emmy Awards (six wins), eleven Satellite Awards (five wins), nine Golden Globe Awards (four wins), thirty Teen Choice Awards (fourteen wins), three Writers Guild of America Awards, and three Directors Guild of America Awards. Amongst the wins for the series are a Satellite Award for "Best Television Series – Musical or Comedy", a Screen Actors Guild Award for Outstanding Performance by an Ensemble in a Comedy Series", and a People's Choice Award for "Favorite New TV Comedy".

The series had an ensemble cast and several different Glee actors received acting award nominations. Jane Lynch, Matthew Morrison, Lea Michele and Chris Colfer all won Satellite Awards and were nominated for Golden Globe and Emmy Awards. Lynch was nominated for eighteen individual awards (winning eight), the most of any cast members. Several crew members were also nominated for awards, with series creator Ryan Murphy nominated for three Writers Guild of America Awards and two Directors Guild of America Awards. As of October 2026, Glee was nominated for over 150 awards, of which it won more than 70.

== AfterEllen.com and AfterElton.com Awards ==
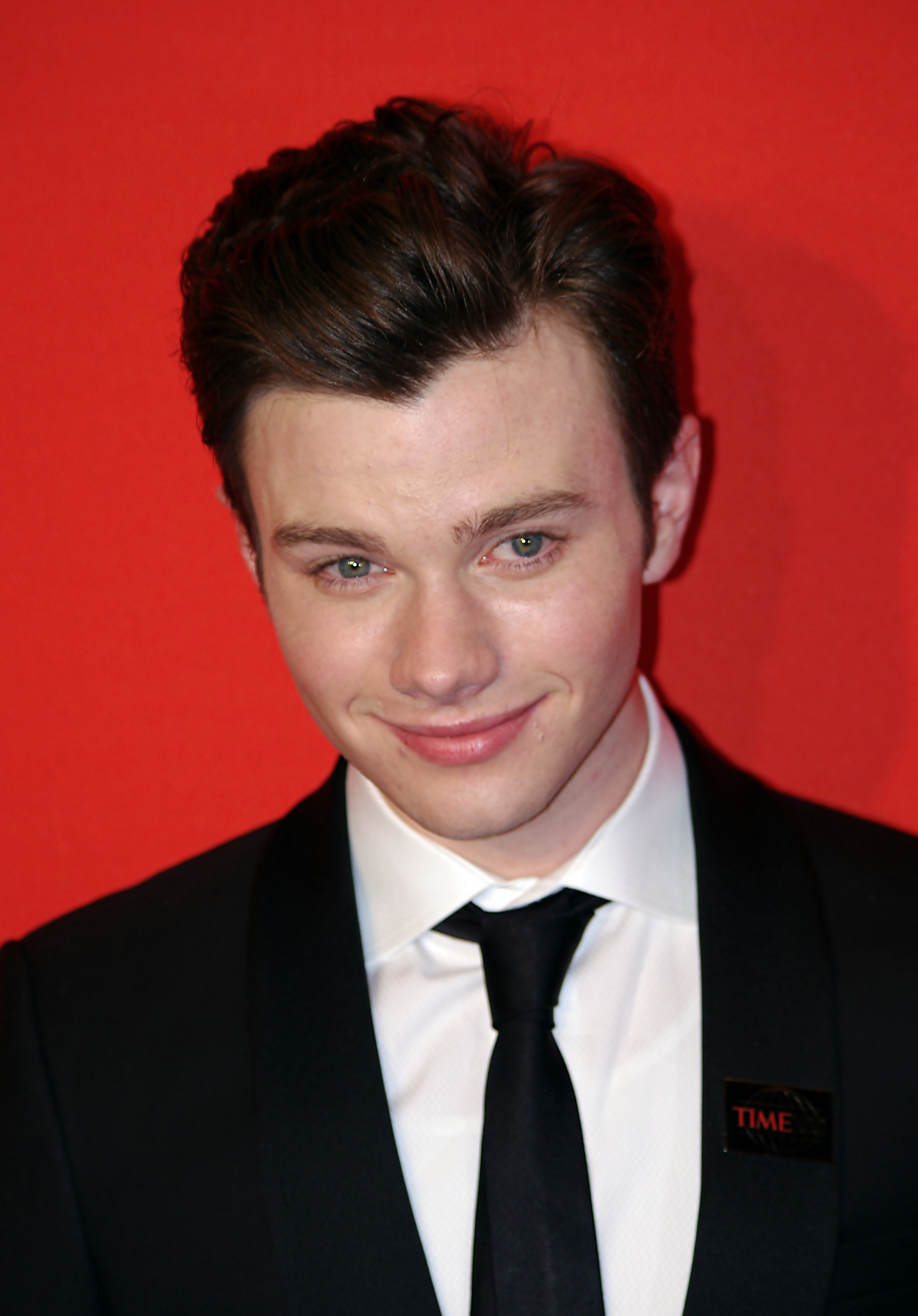
Colfer was named "Favorite Breakout Actor" at the 2010 Gay People's Choice Awards.

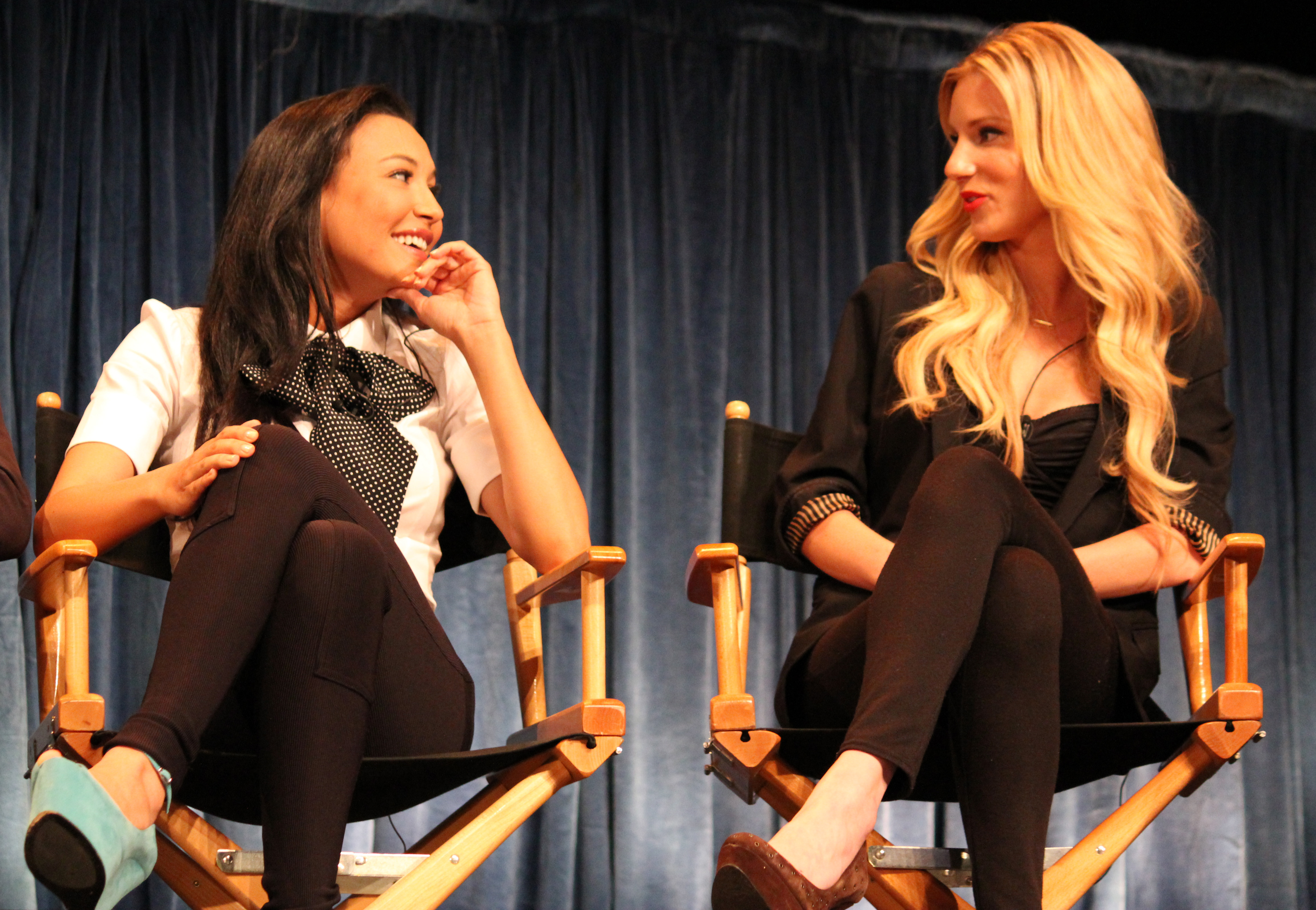
Santana (Rivera, left) and Brittany (Morris, right) were nominated "Favorite Fictional Lesbian Couple" at the 2010 AfterEllen.com Visibility Awards.

The gay media websites AfterEllen.com and AfterElton.com run Lesbian/Bisexual and Gay People's Choice Awards respectively, as well as Visibility Awards for the LGBT community. The awards are voted on by the websites' users.

| Year | Award | Category | Nominee | Result | Ref |
|---|---|---|---|---|---|
| 2010 | Lesbian/Bi People's Choice Awards | Favorite Female TV Star (Comedy) | Jane Lynch | Won | |
| 2010 | Lesbian/Bi People's Choice Awards | Favorite New Show | | Won | |
| 2010 | Lesbian/Bi People's Choice Awards | Favorite Music Duo or Group | Glee Cast | Nominated | |
| 2010 | Gay People's Choice Awards | Favorite New Show | | Won | |
| 2010 | Gay People's Choice Awards | Favorite Breakout Actor | Chris Colfer | Won | |
| 2010 | Gay People's Choice Awards | Favorite Breakout Actress | Lea Michele | Won | |
| 2010 | Gay People's Choice Awards | Best Ensemble TV Cast | | Won | |
| 2010 | Gay People's Choice Awards | Favorite Music Duo or Group | Glee Cast | Won | |
| 2010 | AfterEllen.com Visibility Awards | Favorite TV Comedy | | Won | |
| 2010 | AfterEllen.com Visibility Awards | Favorite TV Actress | Naya Rivera | Nominated | |
| 2010 | AfterEllen.com Visibility Awards | Favorite TV Actress | Jane Lynch | Nominated | |
| 2010 | AfterEllen.com Visibility Awards | Favorite Fictional Lesbian Couple | Brittany Pierce and Santana Lopez | Nominated | |
| 2010 | AfterElton.com Visibility Awards | Favorite TV Comedy | | Won | |
| 2010 | AfterElton.com Visibility Awards | Favorite TV Actor | Chris Colfer | Won | |
| 2010 | AfterElton.com Visibility Awards | Favorite TV Couple | Kurt Hummel and Blaine Anderson | Won | |
| 2010 | AfterElton.com Visibility Awards | Best Gay Moment of the Year | Glee's "Teenage Dream" performance | Nominated | |
| 2010 | AfterElton.com Visibility Awards | Favorite Music Video | Glee's "Teenage Dream" | Nominated | |

== Dorian Awards ==
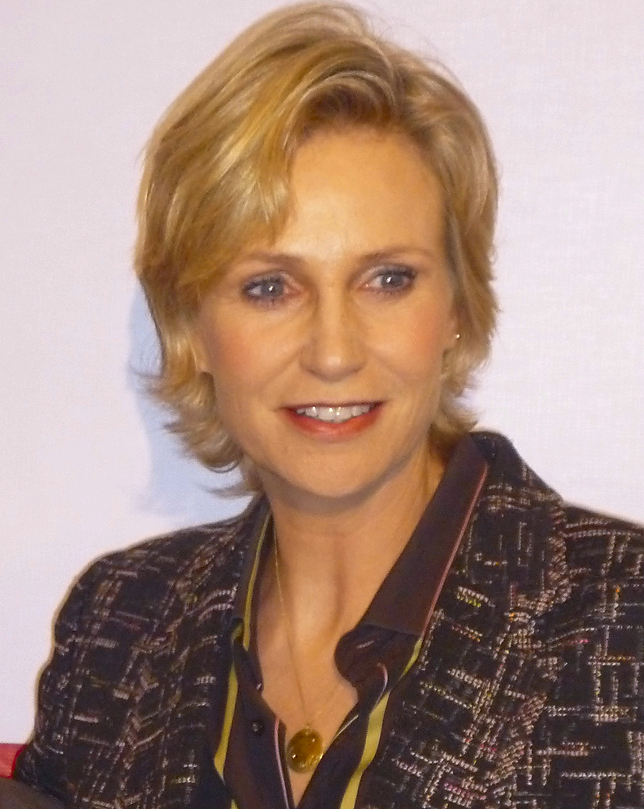
Lynch won Dorian Awards in 2010 and 2011.

In the Dorian Awards' inaugural year, 2010, Glee won in three categories. It won in four categories in 2011, with the "TV Comedy Performance of the Year" award resulting in a tie between Chris Colfer and Jane Lynch.

| Year | Category | Nominee | Result | Ref |
|---|---|---|---|---|
| 2010 | TV Musical or Comedy of the Year | | Won | |
| 2010 | Campy TV Show of the Year | | Won | |
| 2010 | TV Performance of the Year: Musical or Comedy | Jane Lynch | Won | |
| 2011 | TV Musical or Comedy of the Year | | Won | |
| 2011 | LGBT-Themed TV Show of the Year | | Won | |
| 2011 | TV Comedy Performance of the Year | Chris Colfer | Won | |
| 2011 | TV Comedy Performance of the Year | Jane Lynch | Won | |
| 2011 | We're Wilde About You Rising Star Award | Darren Criss | Won | |
| 2012 | TV Musical Program of the Year | | Won | |
| 2013 | TV Musical Performance of the Year | Darren Criss | Nominated | |

== Emmy Awards ==
=== Primetime Emmy Awards ===
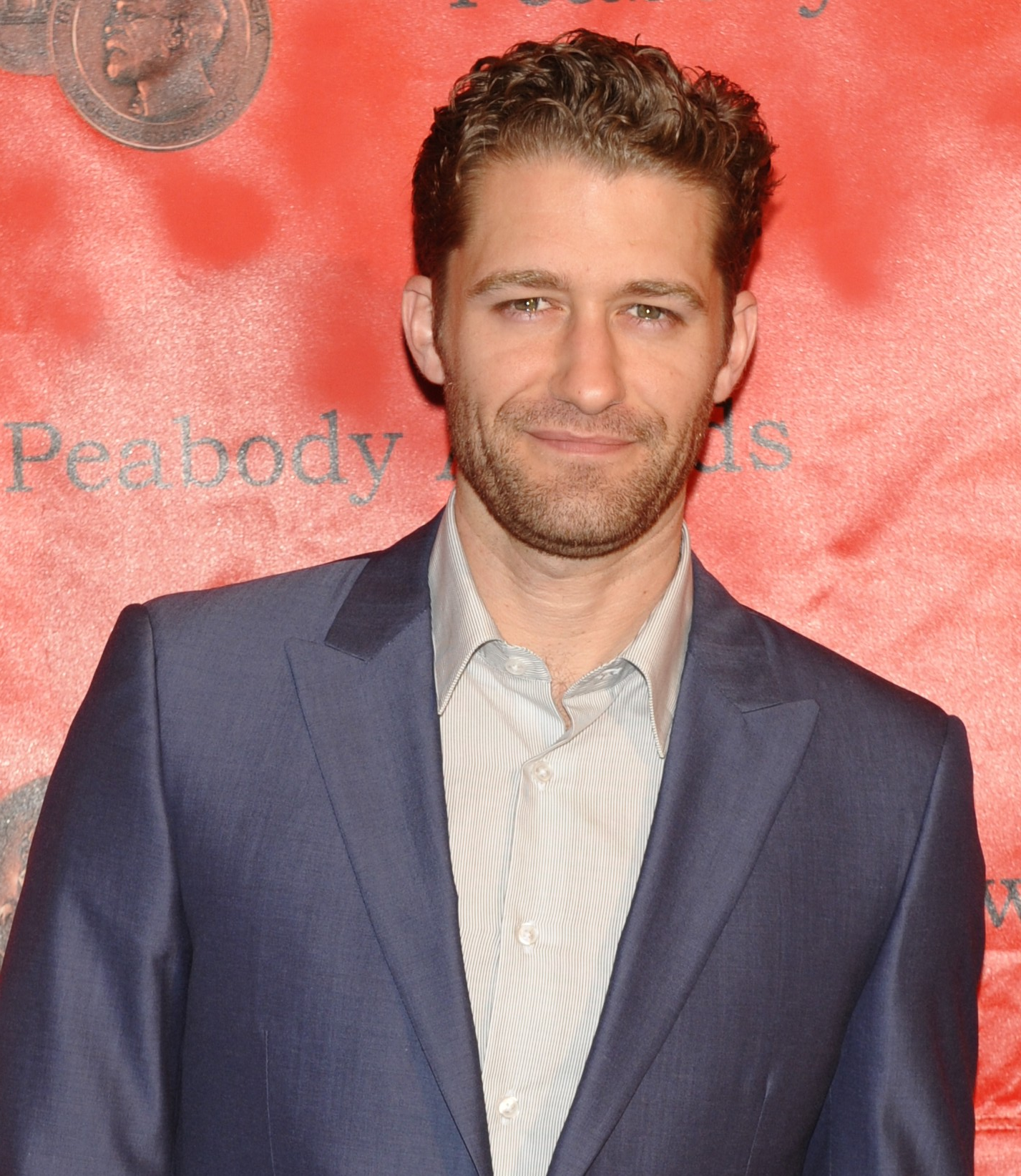
Morrison was nominated for Outstanding Lead Actor in a Comedy Series at the 62nd Primetime Emmy Awards.

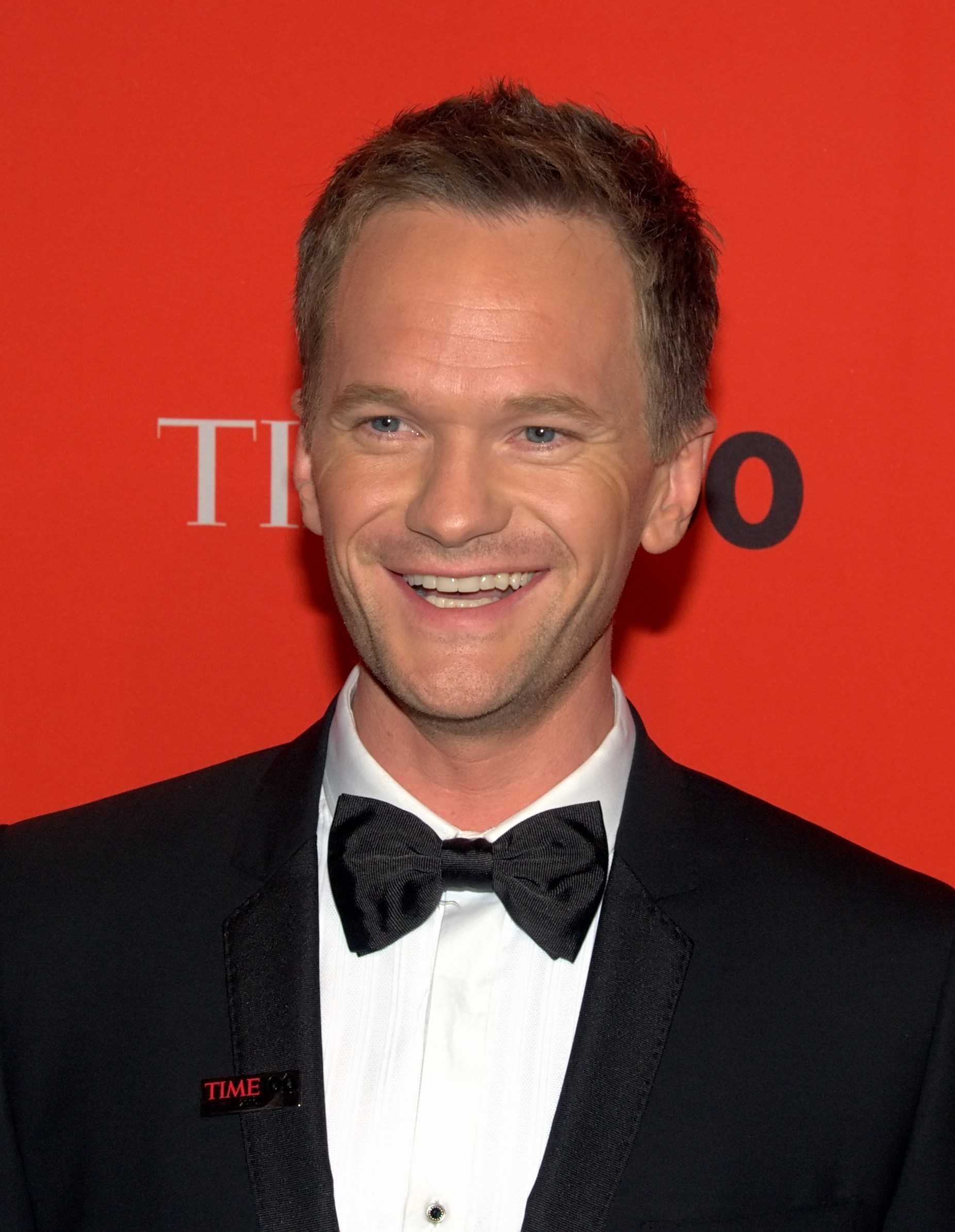
Harris won Outstanding Guest Actor in a Comedy Series for his role in "Dream On".

| Year | Category | Nominee | Episode(s) | Result | Ref |
|---|---|---|---|---|---|
| 2010 | Outstanding Lead Actor in a Comedy Series | Matthew Morrison | "Mash-Up" | Nominated | |
| 2010 | Outstanding Lead Actress in a Comedy Series | Lea Michele | "Sectionals" | Nominated | |
| 2010 | Outstanding Supporting Actor in a Comedy Series | Chris Colfer | "Laryngitis" | Nominated | |
| 2010 | Outstanding Supporting Actress in a Comedy Series | Jane Lynch | "The Power of Madonna" | Won | |
| 2010 | Outstanding Guest Actor in a Comedy Series | Neil Patrick Harris | "Dream On" | Won | |
| 2010 | Outstanding Guest Actor in a Comedy Series | Mike O'Malley | "Wheels" | Nominated | |
| 2010 | Outstanding Guest Actress in a Comedy Series | Kristin Chenoweth | "The Rhodes Not Taken" | Nominated | |
| 2010 | Outstanding Comedy Series | | ^{See below} | Nominated | |
| 2010 | Outstanding Writing for a Comedy Series | Ryan Murphy, Brad Falchuk, Ian Brennan | "Pilot" – Director's Cut | Nominated | |
| 2010 | Outstanding Directing for a Comedy Series | Ryan Murphy | "Pilot" – Director's Cut | Won | |
| 2010 | Outstanding Directing for a Comedy Series | Paris Barclay | "Wheels" | Nominated | |
| 2011 | Outstanding Comedy Series | | ^{See below} | Nominated | |
| 2011 | Outstanding Supporting Actor in a Comedy Series | Chris Colfer | "Grilled Cheesus" | Nominated | |
| 2011 | Outstanding Supporting Actress in a Comedy Series | Jane Lynch | "Funeral" | Nominated | |
| 2011 | Outstanding Guest Actress in a Comedy Series | Kristin Chenoweth | "Rumours" | Nominated | |
| 2011 | Outstanding Guest Actress in a Comedy Series | Gwyneth Paltrow | "The Substitute" | Won | |
| 2011 | Outstanding Guest Actress in a Comedy Series | Dot-Marie Jones | "Never Been Kissed" | Nominated | |
| 2012 | Outstanding Guest Actress in a Comedy Series | Dot-Marie Jones | "Choke" | Nominated | |
| 2013 | Outstanding Supporting Actress in a Comedy Series | Jane Lynch | "Feud" | Nominated | |
| 2013 | Outstanding Guest Actress in a Comedy Series | Dot-Marie Jones | "Shooting Star" | Nominated | |
| 2013 | Outstanding Directing for a Comedy Series | Paris Barclay | "Diva" | Nominated | |
| 2014 | Outstanding Directing for a Comedy Series | Paris Barclay | "100" | Nominated | |

=== Creative Arts Emmy Awards ===
| Year | Category | Nominee | Episode | Result | Ref |
|---|---|---|---|---|---|
| 2010 | Outstanding Art Direction for a Single-Camera Series | Mark Hutman, Christopher Brown, Barbara Munch | "Pilot" – Director's Cut | Nominated | |
| 2010 | Outstanding Casting for a Comedy Series | Robert J. Ulrich, Eric Dawson, Jim Carnahan | —N/a | Nominated | |
| 2010 | Outstanding Hairstyling for a Single-Camera Series | Lynda K. Walker, Ann Marie Luddy, Michael Ward, Gina Bonacquisti | "Hairography" | Nominated | |
| 2010 | Outstanding Hairstyling for a Single-Camera Series | Stacey K. Black, Mary G. Stultz, Roxanne N. Sutphen, Gina Bonacquisti | "The Power of Madonna" | Nominated | |
| 2010 | Outstanding Costumes for a Series | Lou A. Eyrich, Marisa Aboitiz | "The Power of Madonna" | Nominated | |
| 2010 | Outstanding Makeup for a Single-Camera Series (Non-Prosthetic) | Eryn Krueger Mekash, Kelley Mitchell, Jennifer Greenberg, Robin Neal-Luce, Kelcey Fry, Zoe Haywas | "The Power of Madonna" | Nominated | |
| 2010 | Outstanding Makeup for a Single-Camera Series (Non-Prosthetic) | Eryn Krueger Mekash, Kelley Mitchell, Trent Cotner, Jennifer Greenberg, Mike Mekash | "Theatricality" | Nominated | |
| 2010 | Outstanding Creative Achievement in Interactive Media — Fiction | Coincident TV, Fox Broadcasting Company, Glee Hyperpromo And Superfan | —N/a | Nominated | |
| 2010 | Outstanding Sound Mixing for a Comedy or Drama Series (One Hour) | Phillip W. Palmer, Doug Andham, Joseph H. Earle | "The Power of Madonna" | Won | |
| 2011 | Outstanding Casting for a Comedy Series | Robert J. Ulrich and Eric Dawson | —N/a | Won | |
| 2011 | Outstanding Costumes for a Series | Lou A. Eyrich and Marisa Aboitiz | "New York" | Nominated | |
| 2011 | Outstanding Hairstyling for a Single-Camera Series | Janis Clark, Sterfon Demings, Monte Haught, Susan Zietlow-Maust and Stacy Black | "The Sue Sylvester Shuffle" | Nominated | |
| 2011 | Outstanding Prosthetic Makeup for a Series, Miniseries, Movie or a Special | Eryn Krueger Mekash, Jen Greenberg, Kelley Mitchell, Robin Luce, Mike Mekash, Melissa Buell, Christien Tinsley and Hiroshi Yada | "The Sue Sylvester Shuffle" | Nominated | |
| 2011 | Outstanding Makeup for a Single-Camera Series (Non-Prosthetic) | Eryn Krueger Mekash, Jen Greenberg, Robin Luce and Mike Mekash | "The Rocky Horror Glee Show" | Nominated | |
| 2011 | Outstanding Sound Mixing for a Comedy or Drama Series (One Hour) | Phillip W. Palmer, Joseph H. Earle and Doug Andham | "The Substitute" | Nominated | |
| 2012 | Outstanding Cinematography for a Single-Camera Series | Michael Goi | "Asian F" | Nominated | |
| 2012 | Outstanding Makeup for a Single-Camera Series | Kelley Mitchell, Jennifer Greenberg, Melissa Buell, Tym Shutchai Buacharern, Paula Jane Hamilton and Darla Albright | "Yes/No" | Nominated | |
| 2013 | Outstanding Makeup for a Single-Camera Series | Kelley Mitchell, Jennifer Greenberg, Melissa Buell, Tym Shutchai Buacharern, Paula Jane Hamilton and Darla Albright | "Guilty Pleasures" | Nominated | |
| 2015 | Outstanding Original Music and Lyrics | Darren Criss | "Dreams Come True" – "This Time" | Nominated | |

== Golden Globe Awards ==
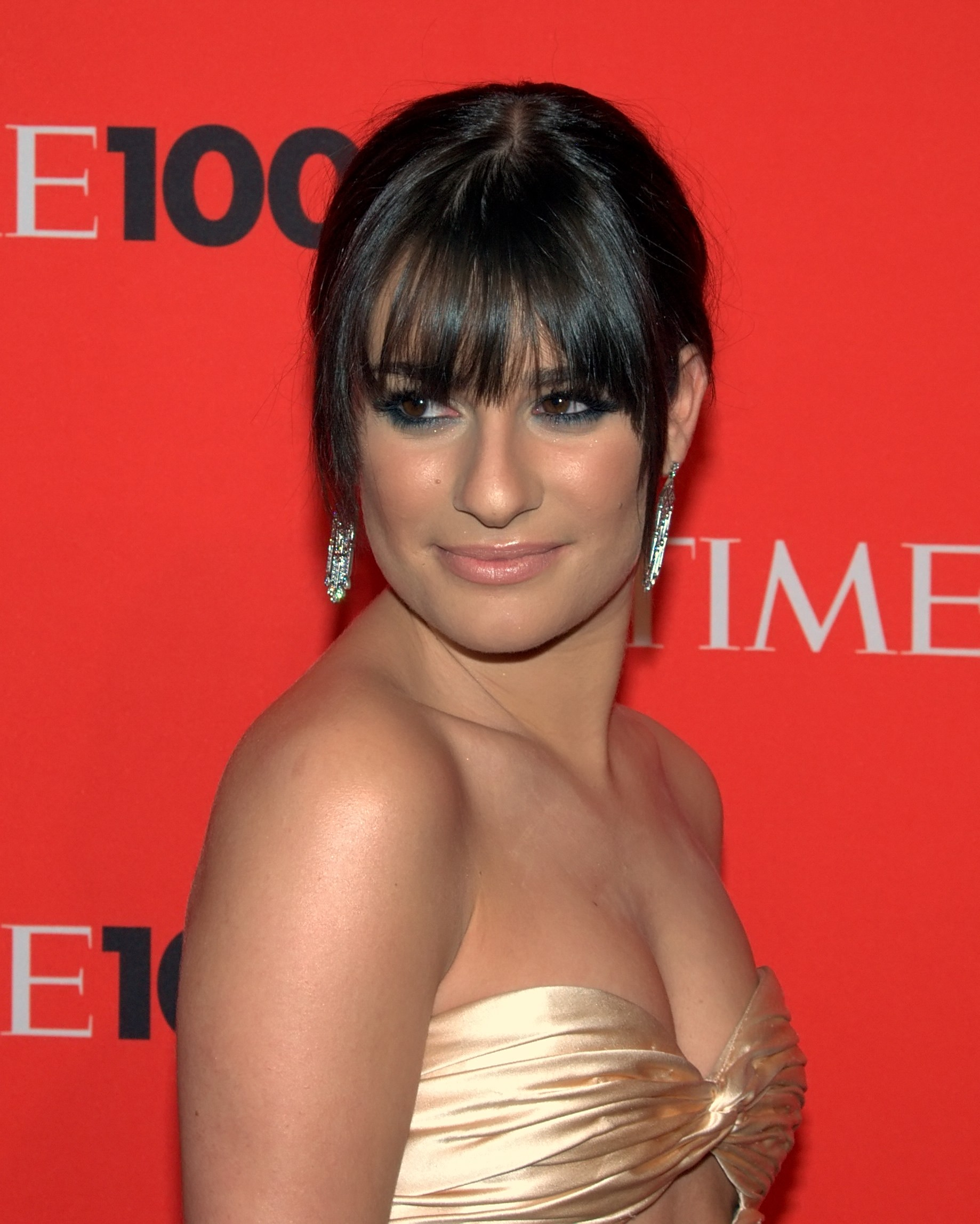
Michele was nominated "Best Actress – TV Series Musical or Comedy" at the 2010 and 2011 Golden Globe Awards.

Glee won "Best Television Series – Musical or Comedy" at the Hollywood Foreign Press Association's 2010 Golden Globe Awards. Lea Michele, Jane Lynch and Matthew Morrison all received nominations in acting categories. The show was nominated for exactly the same awards at the 2011 Golden Globe Awards with the addition of a nomination for Chris Colfer for Best Supporting Actor, and Colfer and the series both won. In 2012, it was only nominated in the series category, and did not win.

| Year | Category | Nominee | Result | Ref |
|---|---|---|---|---|
| 2010 | Best Television Series – Musical or Comedy | | Won | |
| 2010 | Best Actor – Television Series Musical or Comedy | Matthew Morrison | Nominated | |
| 2010 | Best Actress – Television Series Musical or Comedy | Lea Michele | Nominated | |
| 2010 | Best Supporting Actress – Series, Miniseries or Television Film | Jane Lynch | Nominated | |
| 2011 | Best Television Series – Musical or Comedy | | Won | |
| 2011 | Best Actor – Television Series Musical or Comedy | Matthew Morrison | Nominated | |
| 2011 | Best Actress – Television Series Musical or Comedy | Lea Michele | Nominated | |
| 2011 | Best Supporting Actress – Series, Miniseries or Television Film | Jane Lynch | Won | |
| 2011 | Best Supporting Actor – Series, Miniseries or Television Film | Chris Colfer | Won | |
| 2012 | Best Television Series – Musical or Comedy | | Nominated | |

== Grammy Awards ==
The Grammy Awards are awarded annually by the National Academy of Recording Arts and Sciences of the United States. Glee Cast has been nominated for three awards.

| Year | Nominee / work | Award | Result |
|---|---|---|---|
| 2011 | Glee: The Music, Volume 1 | Best Compilation Soundtrack Album for a Motion Picture, Television or Other Visual Media | Nominated |
| 2011 | "Don't Stop Believin' (Regionals Version)" | Best Pop Performance by a Duo or Group with Vocals (Note: Nominated vocalists: Cory Monteith, Lea Michele, Chris Colfer, Amber Riley, Kevin McHale, Jenna Ushkowitz, Mark Salling and Naya Rivera) | Nominated |
| 2012 | Glee: The Music, Volume 4 | Best Compilation Soundtrack Album for a Motion Picture, Television or Other Visual Media | Nominated |

== People's Choice Awards ==
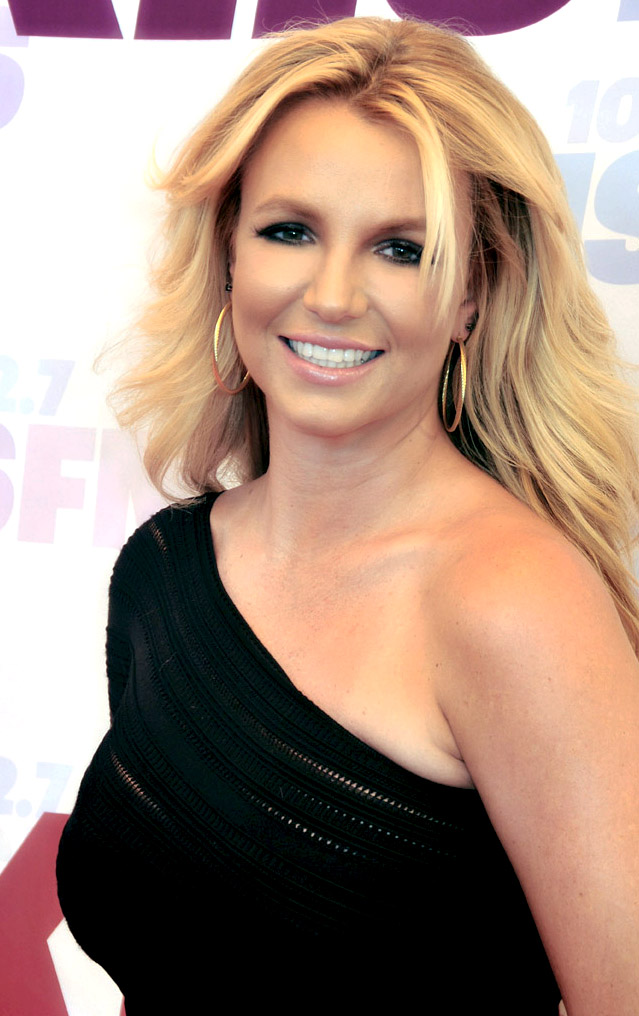
Spears was nominated "Favorite TV Guest Star" at the 2011 People's Choice Awards for her appearance in the episode "Britney/Brittany".

The People's Choice Awards recognize the people and work of popular culture, and are voted on by the general public. Glee won the "Favorite New TV Comedy" award in 2010, and was nominated for three awards in 2011.

| Year | Category | Nominee | Result | Ref |
|---|---|---|---|---|
| 2010 | Favorite New TV Comedy | | Won | |
| 2011 | Favorite TV Comedy | | Won | |
| 2011 | Favorite TV Guest Star | Britney Spears | Nominated | |
| 2011 | Favorite TV Guest Star | Neil Patrick Harris | Nominated | |
| 2011 | Favorite TV Comedy Actor | Matthew Morrison | Nominated | |
| 2011 | Favorite TV Comedy Actress | Jane Lynch | Won | |
| 2012 | Favorite TV Comedy | | Nominated | |
| 2012 | Favorite TV Actor Comedy | Chris Colfer | Nominated | |
| 2012 | Favorite TV Actor Comedy | Cory Monteith | Nominated | |
| 2012 | Favorite TV Actress Comedy | Jane Lynch | Nominated | |
| 2012 | Favorite TV Actress Comedy | Lea Michele | Won | |
| 2012 | Favorite TV Guest Star | Gwyneth Paltrow | Nominated | |
| 2012 | Favorite TV Guest Star | Kristin Chenoweth | Nominated | |
| 2013 | Favorite TV Comedy | | Nominated | |
| 2013 | Favorite TV Actor Comedy | Chris Colfer | Won | |
| 2013 | Favorite TV Actress Comedy | Jane Lynch | Nominated | |
| 2013 | Favorite TV Actress Comedy | Lea Michele | Won | |
| 2013 | Favorite TV Fan Following | Gleeks | Nominated | |
| 2014 | Favorite Network TV Comedy | | Nominated | |
| 2014 | Favorite Comedic TV Actor | Chris Colfer | Won | |
| 2014 | Favorite Comedic TV Actor | Darren Criss | Nominated | |
| 2014 | Favorite Comedic TV Actress | Jane Lynch | Nominated | |
| 2014 | Favorite Comedic TV Actress | Lea Michele | Nominated | |
| 2014 | Favorite On-Screen Chemistry | Kurt (Chris Colfer) and Blaine (Darren Criss) | Nominated | |
| 2014 | Favorite TV Bromance | Blaine (Darren Criss) and Sam (Chord Overstreet) | Nominated | |
| 2014 | Favorite TV Gal Pals | Rachel (Lea Michele) and Santana (Naya Rivera) | Won | |
| 2015 | Favorite Comedic TV Actor | Chris Colfer | Won | |

== Satellite Awards ==
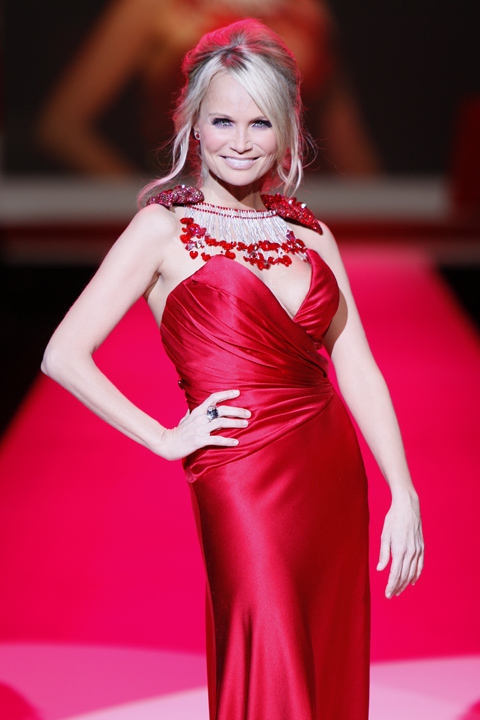
Chenoweth won "Outstanding Guest Star" at the 2009 Satellite Awards for her performance in the episode "The Rhodes Not Taken".

The Satellite Awards, formerly known as the Golden Satellite Awards, are presented both for cinema and television. Glee has won five awards, including "Outstanding Guest Star" for special guest star Kristin Chenoweth.

| Year | Category | Nominee | Result | Ref |
|---|---|---|---|---|
| 2009 | Best Television Series – Musical or Comedy | | Won | |
| 2009 | Best Actress in a Musical or Comedy TV Series | Lea Michele | Won | |
| 2009 | Best Actor in a Musical or Comedy TV Series | Matthew Morrison | Won | |
| 2009 | Best Supporting Actress | Jane Lynch | Won | |
| 2009 | Best Supporting Actor | Chris Colfer | Nominated | |
| 2009 | Outstanding Guest Star | Kristin Chenoweth | Won | |
| 2010 | Best Television Series – Musical or Comedy | | Nominated | |
| 2010 | Best Actress in a Musical or Comedy TV Series | Lea Michele | Nominated | |
| 2010 | Best Actor in a Musical or Comedy TV Series | Matthew Morrison | Nominated | |
| 2010 | Best Supporting Actress | Jane Lynch | Nominated | |
| 2010 | Best Supporting Actor | Chris Colfer | Nominated | |

== Teen Choice Awards ==
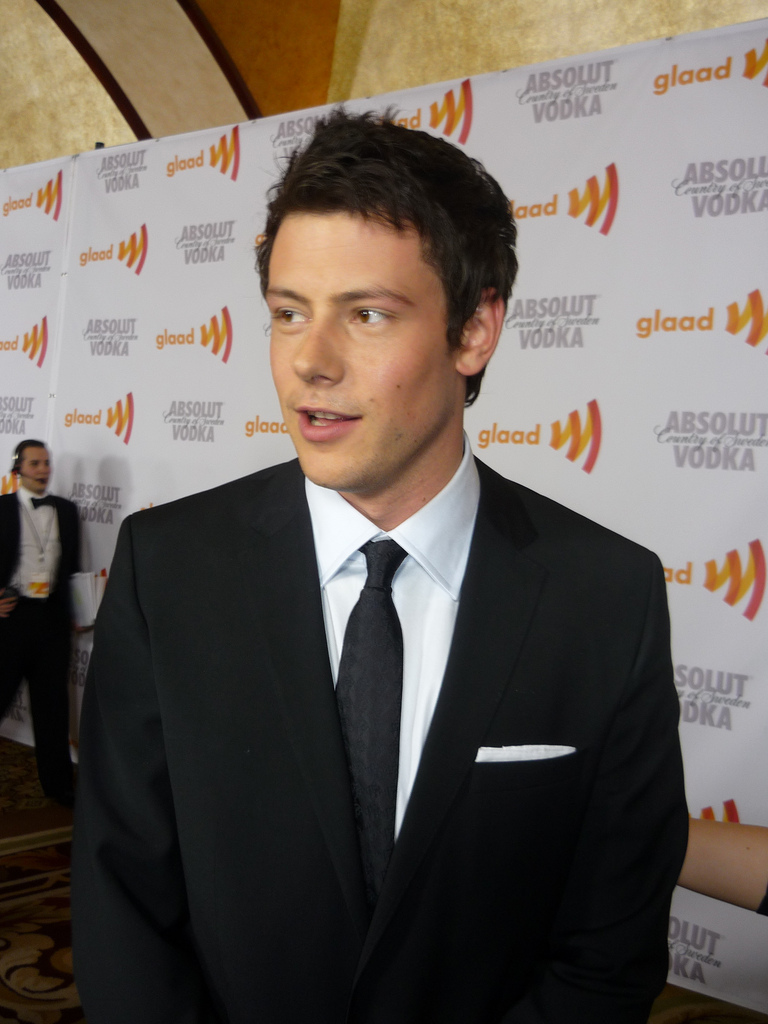
Cory Monteith won the 2011 Choice TV: Actor Comedy Award.

The Teen Choice Awards are voted on by teenagers. Glee was nominated for three awards in 2009, thirteen awards in 2010, and nine awards in both 2011 and 2013. It won three awards annually starting in 2010, increasing to four in 2013.

| Year | Category | Nominee | Result | Ref |
|---|---|---|---|---|
| 2009 | Choice TV: Breakout Series | | Nominated | |
| 2009 | Choice TV: Breakout Star Female | Lea Michele | Nominated | |
| 2009 | Choice TV: Breakout Star Male | Cory Monteith | Nominated | |
| 2010 | Choice TV Show: Comedy | | Won | |
| 2010 | Choice TV Actor: Comedy | Cory Monteith | Nominated | |
| 2010 | Choice TV Actress: Comedy | Lea Michele | Nominated | |
| 2010 | Choice TV: Villain | Jane Lynch | Nominated | |
| 2010 | Choice Music: Group | Glee Cast | Nominated | |
| 2010 | Choice TV: Female Scene Stealer | Amber Riley | Nominated | |
| 2010 | Choice TV: Male Scene Stealer | Chris Colfer | Won | |
| 2010 | Choice TV: Male Scene Stealer | Matthew Morrison | Nominated | |
| 2010 | Choice TV: Female Breakout Star | Dianna Agron | Nominated | |
| 2010 | Choice TV: Male Breakout Star | Mark Salling | Nominated | |
| 2010 | Choice TV: Male Breakout Star | Kevin McHale | Nominated | |
| 2010 | Choice TV: Parental Unit | Mike O'Malley | Won | |
| 2010 | Most Fanatic Fans | | Nominated | |
| 2011 | Choice TV: Comedy | | Won | |
| 2011 | Choice TV: Actor Comedy | Cory Monteith | Won | |
| 2011 | Choice TV: Scene Stealer Male | Mark Salling | Nominated | |
| 2011 | Choice TV: Scene Stealer Male | Chris Colfer | Nominated | |
| 2011 | Choice TV: Scene Stealer Female | Dianna Agron | Nominated | |
| 2011 | Choice TV: Scene Stealer Female | Amber Riley | Nominated | |
| 2011 | Choice Music: Group | Glee Cast | Nominated | |
| 2011 | Choice TV: Villain | Jane Lynch | Nominated | |
| 2011 | Choice TV: Breakout Star | Darren Criss | Won | |
| 2012 | Choice TV: Comedy | | Won | |
| 2012 | Choice TV: Scene Stealer Female | Dianna Agron | Nominated | |
| 2012 | Choice TV: Actor Comedy | Chris Colfer | Won | |
| 2012 | Choice TV: Actress Comedy | Lea Michele | Won | |
| 2013 | Choice TV: Comedy | | Won | |
| 2013 | Choice TV: Actor Comedy | Chris Colfer | Nominated | |
| 2013 | Choice TV: Actress Comedy | Lea Michele | Won | |
| 2013 | Choice TV: Villain | Becca Tobin | Nominated | |
| 2013 | Choice TV: Male Scene Stealer | Chord Overstreet | Won | |
| 2013 | Choice TV: Female Scene Stealer | Heather Morris | Nominated | |
| 2013 | Choice TV: Breakout Star | Melissa Benoist | Nominated | |
| 2013 | Choice TV: Breakout Star | Blake Jenner | Won | |
| 2013 | Candie's Style Icon | Lea Michele | Nominated | |
| 2014 | Choice TV Show: Comedy | | Nominated | |
| 2014 | Choice TV Actor: Comedy | Chord Overstreet | Nominated | |
| 2014 | Choice TV Actress: Comedy | Lea Michele | Won | |
| 2014 | Choice TV: Villain | Jane Lynch | Nominated | |
| 2014 | Choice TV: Male Scene Stealer | Darren Criss | Nominated | |
| 2014 | Choice TV: Female Scene Stealer | Naya Rivera | Nominated | |
| 2015 | Choice TV Actor: Comedy | Chris Colfer | Nominated | |
| 2015 | Choice TV Actress: Comedy | Lea Michele | Won | |

== Other awards ==
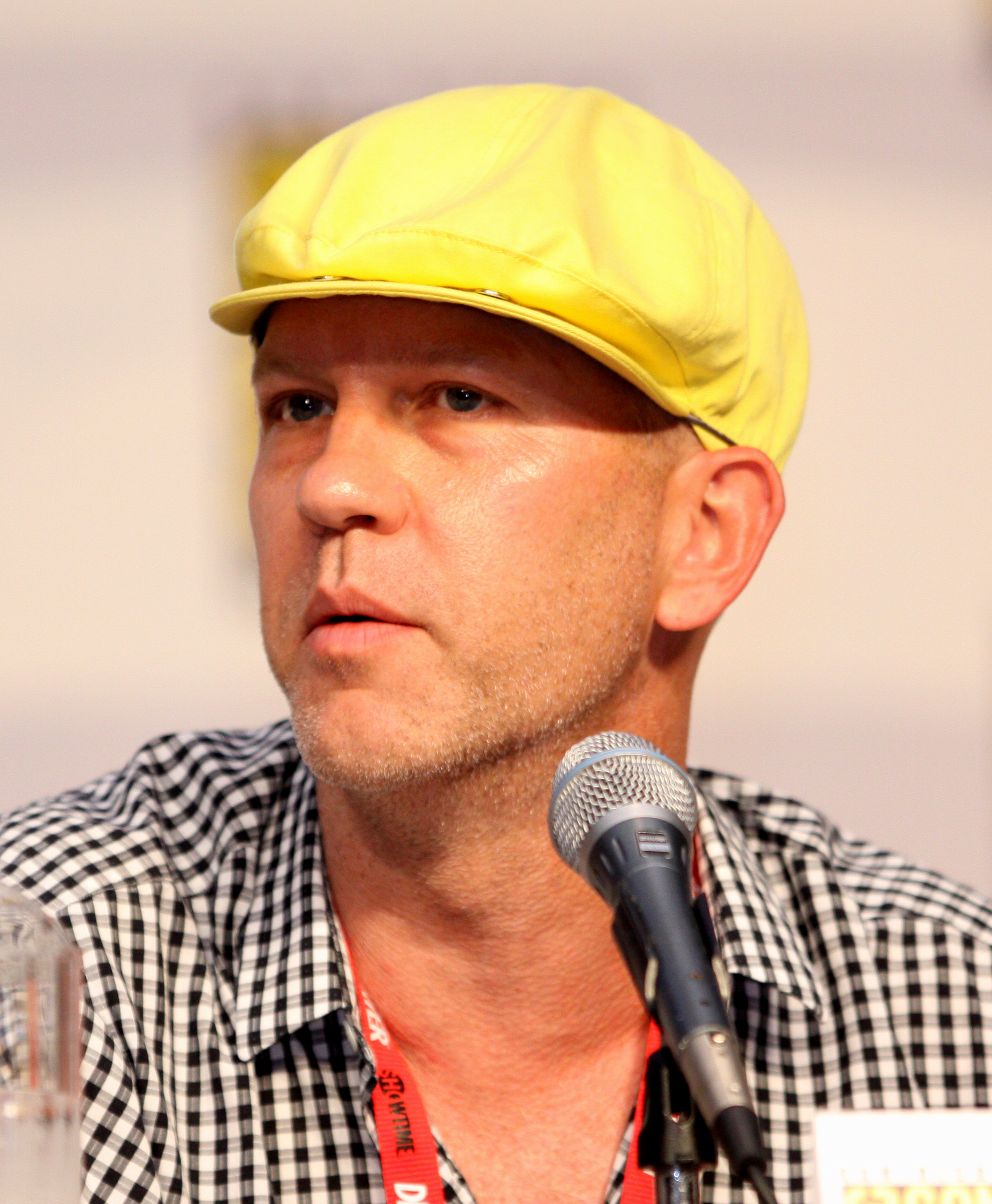
Murphy, along with Brennan and Falchuk, won the 2010 "Comedy Writer of the Year" award at the Just for Laughs awards.

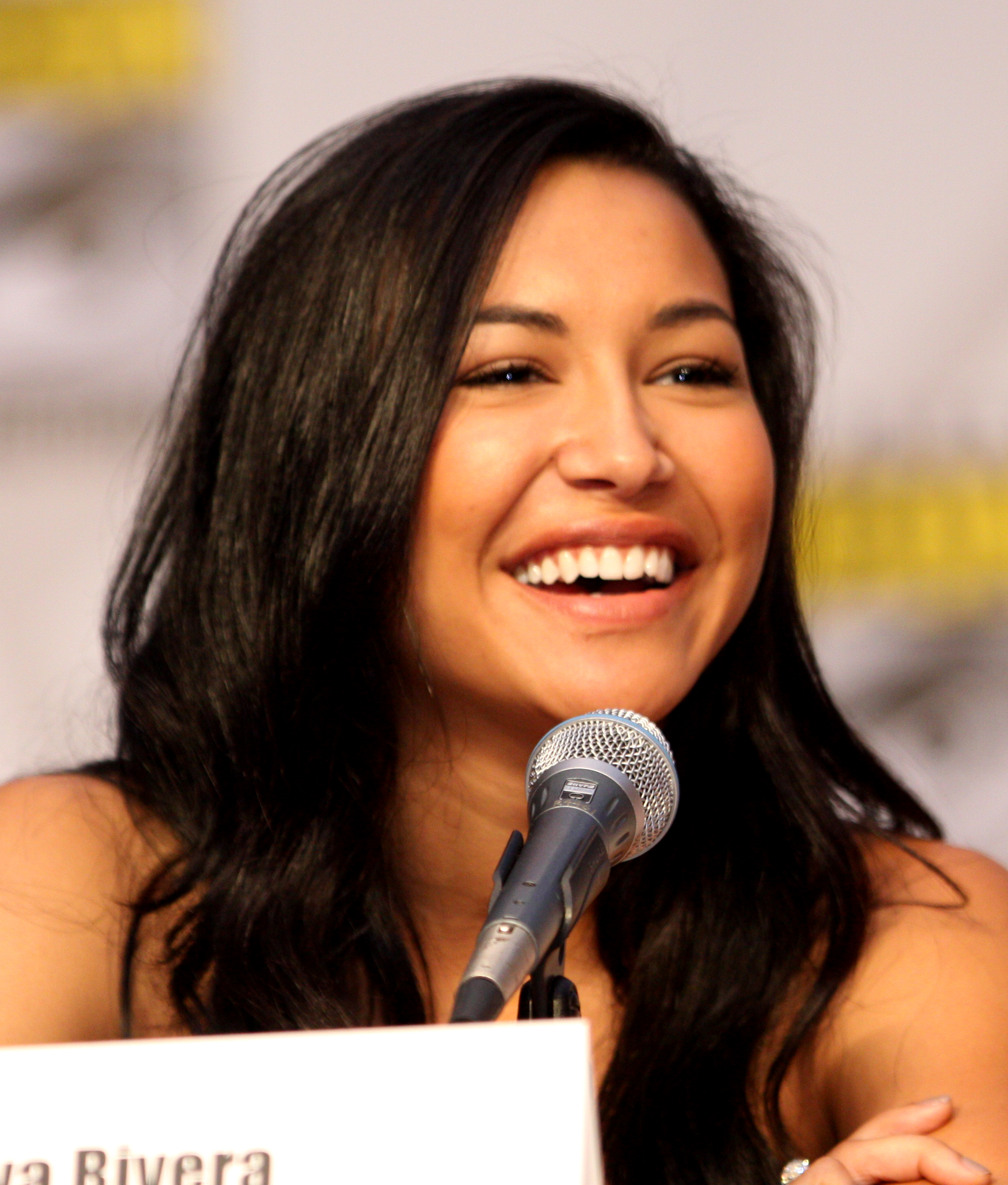
Rivera won best "Female Music Artist" at the 2011 ALMA Awards.

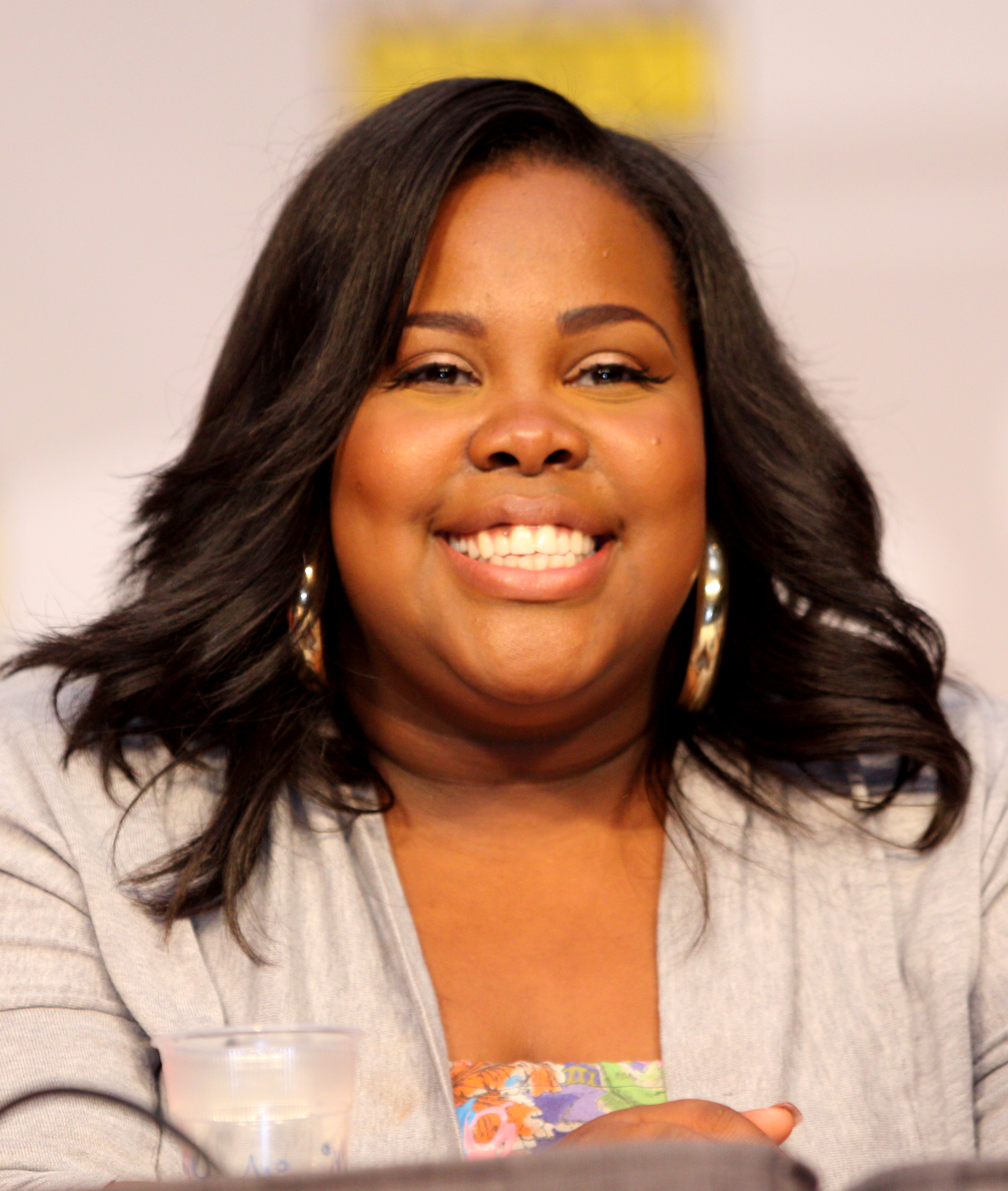
Riley was nominated for NAACP Image Awards in 2011 and 2012.

| Year | Award | Category | Nominee | Result | Ref |
|---|---|---|---|---|---|
| 2010 | ACE Eddie Awards | Best Edited One-Hour Series for Commercial Television | Bradley Buecker, Doc Crotzer, Joe Leonard & John Roberts for "Journey to Regionals" | Nominated | |
| 2009 | AFI Awards | Television Program of the Year | Glee | Won | |
| 2010 | AFI Awards | Television Program of the Year | Glee | Won | |
| 2011 | ALMA Awards | Favorite TV Actress – Leading Role in a Comedy | Naya Rivera | Nominated | |
| 2011 | ALMA Awards | Female Music Artist | Naya Rivera | Won | |
| 2010 | American Music Awards | Soundtracks – Favorite Album | Glee: The Music, Volume 3 Showstoppers | Won | |
| 2009 | Art Directors Guild Awards | Single Camera Television Series | Mark Hutman for "Pilot" | Nominated | |
| 2009 | Artios Awards | Television Pilot — Comedy | Robert J. Ulrich, Eric Dawson, Carol Kritzer and Jim Carnahan | Won | |
| 2010 | BAFTA Awards | YouTube Audience Award | Glee | Nominated | |
| 2011 | BAFTA Awards | International TV Show | Glee | Nominated | |
| 2011 | Brit Awards | International Breakthrough Act | Glee | Nominated | |
| 2010 | CDG Awards | Outstanding Contemporary Television Series | Lou Eyrich | Won | |
| 2011 | CDG Awards | Outstanding Contemporary Television Series | Lou Eyrich | Won | |
| 2012 | CDG Awards | Outstanding Contemporary Television Series | Lou Eyrich and Jennifer Eve | Won | |
| 2009 | Cinema Audio Society Awards | Outstanding Achievement in Sound Mixing for a Television Series | Phillip W. Palmer, Joseph H. Earle Jr. and Doug Andham, for "Wheels" | Nominated | |
| 2010 | Cinema Audio Society Awards | Outstanding Achievement in Sound Mixing for a Television Series | Phillip W. Palmer, Joseph H. Earle Jr. and Doug Andham, for "The Power of Madonna" | Nominated | |
| 2011 | The Comedy Awards | Comedy Actress – TV | Jane Lynch | Nominated | |
| 2011 | Critics' Choice Television Awards | Best Comedy Series | Glee | Nominated | |
| 2011 | Critics' Choice Television Awards | Best Supporting Actress in a Comedy Series | Jane Lynch | Nominated | |
| 2009 | Directors Guild of America Awards | Outstanding Directing – Comedy Series | Paris Barclay for "Wheels" | Nominated | |
| 2009 | Directors Guild of America Awards | Outstanding Directing – Comedy Series | Ryan Murphy for "Pilot" | Nominated | |
| 2010 | Directors Guild of America Awards | Outstanding Directing – Comedy Series | Ryan Murphy for "The Power of Madonna" | Nominated | |
| 2009 | Diversity Awards | Favorite New Television Cast Ensemble | Glee | Won | |
| 2010 | Do Something Awards | Do Something TV Show | Glee | Won | |
| 2011 | Do Something Awards | Do Something TV Show | Glee | Won | |
| 2010 | GLAAD Media Awards | Outstanding Comedy Series | Glee | Won | |
| 2011 | GLAAD Media Awards | Outstanding Comedy Series | Glee | Won | |
| 2012 | GLAAD Media Awards | Outstanding Comedy Series | Glee | Nominated | |
| 2012 | GLAAD Media Awards | Outstanding Reality Program | The Glee Project | Nominated | |
| 2013 | GLAAD Media Awards | Outstanding Comedy Series | Glee | Nominated | |
| 2010 | Golden Reel Awards | Best Sound Editing: Short Form Music in Television | David Klotz for "Pilot" | Won | |
| 2011 | Golden Reel Awards | Best Sound Editing: Short Form Musical in Television | David Klotz for "The Power of Madonna" | Won | |
| 2012 | Golden Reel Awards | Best Sound Editing: Short Form Musical in Television | David Klotz for "The First Time" | Nominated | |
| 2009 | Hollywood Music in Media Awards | Outstanding Musical Supervision — TV | PJ Bloom | Won | |
| 2010 | HPA Awards | Outstanding Editing – Television | Joe Leonard for "The Power of Madonna" | Nominated | |
| 2010 | HPA Awards | Outstanding Editing – Television | Doc Crotzer for "Dream On" | Nominated | |
| 2010 | HPA Awards | Outstanding Editing – Television | Bradley Buecker for "Journey to Regionals" | Nominated | |
| 2010 | HPA Awards | Outstanding Sound – Television | John Benson for "Preggers" | Nominated | |
| 2010 | Imagen Awards | Best Supporting Actress/Television | Naya Rivera | Nominated | |
| 2010 | Just for Laughs Awards | Comedy Writer of the Year | Ian Brennan, Brad Falchuk, Ryan Murphy | Won | |
| 2012 | Kids' Choice Awards Argentina 2012 | International TV Program | Glee | Nominated | |
| 2010 | Media Access Awards | CSA Award | Robert J. Ulrich, Eric Dawson, Carol Kritzer | Won | |
| 2012 | MTV Las Listas 2012 | TV show del año | Glee | Nominated | |
| 2010 | NAACP Image Awards | Outstanding Comedy Series | Glee | Nominated | |
| 2011 | NAACP Image Awards | Outstanding Comedy Series | Glee | Nominated | |
| 2011 | NAACP Image Awards | Outstanding Supporting Actress in a Comedy Series | Amber Riley | Nominated | |
| 2012 | NAACP Image Awards | Outstanding Supporting Actress in a Comedy Series | Amber Riley | Nominated | |
| 2011 | National Television Awards | Digital Choice | Glee | Nominated | |
| 2010 | Nickelodeon Australian Kids' Choice Awards | Fave International Band | Glee | Nominated | |
| 2010 | Nickelodeon Australian Kids' Choice Awards | Fave TV Show | Glee | Nominated | |
| 2009 | Peabody Awards | — | Glee | Won | |
| 2011 | PGA Awards | The Danny Thomas Award for Outstanding Producer of Episodic Television – Comedy | Ian Brennan, Dante Di Loreto, Brad Falchuk, Ryan Murphy, Kenneth Silverstein | Nominated | |
| 2012 | PGA Awards | The Danny Thomas Award for Outstanding Producer of Episodic Television – Comedy | Ian Brennan, Dante Di Loreto, Brad Falchuk, Ryan Murphy, Kenneth Silverstein | Nominated | |
| 2010 | PRISM Awards | Comedy Series | "Vitamin D" | Nominated | |
| 2010 | SAG Awards | Outstanding Performance by an Ensemble in a Comedy Series | ^{See below} | Won | |
| 2011 | SAG Awards | Outstanding Performance by a Male Actor in a Comedy Series | Chris Colfer | Nominated | |
| 2011 | SAG Awards | Outstanding Performance by a Female Actor in a Comedy Series | Jane Lynch | Nominated | |
| 2011 | SAG Awards | Outstanding Performance by an Ensemble in a Comedy Series | ^{See below} | Nominated | |
| 2012 | SAG Awards | Outstanding Performance by an Ensemble in a Comedy Series | ^{See below} | Nominated | |
| 2013 | SAG Awards | Outstanding Performance by an Ensemble in a Comedy Series | ^{See below} | Nominated | |
| 2012 | SOC Lifetime Achievement Awards | Television Camera Operator of the Year | Andrew Mitchell | Won | |
| 2010 | TCA Awards | Outstanding New Program | Glee | Won | |
| 2010 | TCA Awards | Outstanding Achievement in Comedy | Glee | Nominated | |
| 2010 | TCA Awards | Program of the Year | Glee | Won | |
| 2010 | TCA Awards | Individual Achievement in Comedy | Jane Lynch | Won | |
| 2010 | Television Academy Honors | Television With a Conscience | "Wheels" | Won | |
| 2010 | TV Choice Awards | Best New Drama | Glee | Won | |
| 2010 | TV Land Awards | Future Classic | Glee | Won | |
| 2010 | Women's Image Network (WIN) Awards | Outstanding Television Produced by a Woman | Alexis Martin Woodall | Won | |
| 2010 | Women's Image Network (WIN) Awards | Comedy Series | Glee | Nominated | |
| 2010 | Women's Image Network (WIN) Awards | Actress Comedy Series | Jane Lynch | Nominated | |
| 2010 | Writers Guild of America Awards | Comedy Series | Ian Brennan, Brad Falchuk, Ryan Murphy | Nominated | |
| 2010 | Writers Guild of America Awards | New Series | Ian Brennan, Brad Falchuk, Ryan Murphy | Nominated | |
| 2011 | Writers Guild of America Awards | Comedy Series | Ian Brennan, Brad Falchuk, Ryan Murphy | Nominated | |

== Notes ==
^2010 Primetime Emmy Awards episode submissions for "Outstanding Comedy Series": "Pilot" and "Preggers"; "Wheels" and "Sectionals"; "The Power of Madonna" and "Home".

^2011 Primetime Emmy Awards episode submissions for "Outstanding Comedy Series": "Audition" and "Silly Love Songs"; "Original Song" and "The Substitute"; "Duets" and "Never Been Kissed".

^2010 Screen Actors Guild Award winners for "Outstanding Performance by an Ensemble in a Comedy Series": Dianna Agron, Chris Colfer, Patrick Gallagher, Jessalyn Gilsig, Jane Lynch, Jayma Mays, Kevin McHale, Lea Michele, Cory Monteith, Heather Morris, Matthew Morrison, Amber Riley, Naya Rivera, Mark Salling, Harry Shum, Jr., Josh Sussman, Dijon Talton, Iqbal Theba and Jenna Ushkowitz.

^2011 Screen Actors Guild Award nominees for "Outstanding Performance by an Ensemble in a Comedy Series": Max Adler, Dianna Agron, Chris Colfer, Jane Lynch, Jayma Mays, Kevin McHale, Lea Michele, Cory Monteith, Heather Morris, Matthew Morrison, Mike O'Malley, Amber Riley, Naya Rivera, Mark Salling, Harry Shum, Jr., Iqbal Theba, Jenna Ushkowitz.

^2012 Screen Actors Guild Award nominees for "Outstanding Performance by an Ensemble in a Comedy Series": Dianna Agron, Chris Colfer, Darren Criss, Ashley Fink, Dot-Marie Jones, Jane Lynch, Jayma Mays, Kevin McHale, Lea Michele, Cory Monteith, Heather Morris, Matthew Morrison, Mike O'Malley, Chord Overstreet, Lauren Potter, Amber Riley, Naya Rivera, Mark Salling, Harry Shum, Jr., Iqbal Theba, Jenna Ushkowitz.

^2013 Screen Actors Guild Award nominees for "Outstanding Performance by an Ensemble in a Comedy Series": Dianna Agron, Chris Colfer, Darren Criss, Samuel Larsen, Vanessa Lengies, Jane Lynch, Jayma Mays, Kevin McHale, Lea Michele, Cory Monteith, Heather Morris, Matthew Morrison, Alex Newell, Chord Overstreet, Amber Riley, Naya Rivera, Mark Salling, Harry Shum, Jr., Jenna Ushkowitz.
