= Jan Elgarøy =

Norwegian organist and composer (1930–2018)

Jan Elgarøy (20 December 1930 − 24 June 2018) was a Norwegian organist and composer.

He was born in Moss, and was a brother of astronomer Øystein Elgarøy. His instrument was the organ, and he graduated from the Music Conservatory of Oslo in 1950. He also studied in several European countries. He spent most of his professional career as the organist of Lambertseter Church from 1960 to 1992, and composed several pieces.
