= Finnur =

Finnur (/ˈfɪnːʊr/) is a Faroese and Icelandic masculine given name which is a derivative of the Old Norse Finnr. Notable people with the name are as follows:

- Finnur Garðarsson (born 1952), Icelandic swimmer
- Finnur Ingólfsson (born 1954), Icelandic politician
- Finnur Jónsson (1858–1934), Icelandic-Danish philologist and academic
- Finnur Jónsson (bishop) (1704–1789), Icelandic pastor
- Finnur Justinussen (born 1989), Faroese football player
- Finnur Kolbeinsson (born 1972), Icelandic football player
- Finnur Magnússon (1781–1847), Icelandic scholar
- Finnur Atli Magnússon (born 1985), Icelandic basketball player
- Finnur Orri Margeirsson (born 1991), Icelandic football player
- Finnur Tómas Pálmason (born 2001), Icelandic football player
- Finnur Freyr Stefánsson (born 1983), Icelandic basketball coach
- Finnur Nielsen (born 1996), Faroese bassist
