= Pretending (Glee song) =

2011 song by Glee

Song by Glee Cast

from the album Glee: The Music, Volume 6
- Released: May 23, 2011
- Genre: Pop
- Length: 3:57
- Label: Columbia
- Songwriters: Adam Anders, Peer Åström, Shelly Peiken
- Producers: Adam Anders, Peer Åström

"Pretending" is an original song from the second season of the American musical comedy-drama Glee, entitled "New York". The episode included two other original songs: "As Long as You're There" and "Light Up the World". The song was featured on the show's Volume 6 soundtrack.

The song was written by Adam Anders, Peer Astrom and Shelly Peiken.

== Context ==
Rachel Berry and Finn Hudson perform the duet to an enthusiastic audience at Nationals (a metaphor for their rocky relationship and uncertain future). They conclude the song by kissing each other, stunning the entire theatre into silence and "likely ruining their chances of a win with such a blatant display of unprofessionalism".

== Critical reception ==
PopCrush described the song as "heartfelt...one-of-a-kind" song as "the gem of the 'Glee' originals we've seen so far", noting it's "especially poignant" for "encompass[ing] the [Season 2] roller coaster ride" and for not providing "clear answers" to the "destiny" of Rachel and Finn's "broken relationship"; the site rated the song 4 and a half stars out of 5. Idolator called the song a "heartfelt ballad", and partially incorrectly predicted the song would "hit an emotional story beat possibly involving the on-again/off-again lovebirds working out their feelings for each other" rather than being performed as a song at Nationals. Blogcritics deemed it "a heck of a love duet", while Screencrave said it had "heartfelt lyrics and a performance to match by both." Twocents TV wrote the song was "not as good as Faithfully" (performed in the finale of Season 1 - Part 1) and that the "unprofessional and vulgar" performance "just added to the Finchel distaste". DouxReviews gave the song a grade of B+. Jacksonville.com deemed it "forgettable", writing "the duet improves with multiple listens, but still pales to previous Rachel/Finn numbers".
