= Øystein Elgarøy =

Norwegian astronomer

- Born: 13 June 1929; Moss, Norway
- Died: 8 September 1998 (aged 69)
- Scientific career
- Fields: • Astronomy • Solar radio astronomy
- Institutions: University of Oslo

Øystein Elgarøy (13 June 1929 – 8 September 1998) was a Norwegian astronomer, with a specialty in solar radio astronomy. He was appointed as a lecturer of astrophysics at the University of Oslo, located in Oslo, Norway, in 1968, and was a professor from 1983. Elgarøy published several books, including textbooks.

Elgarøy was a brother of composer Jan Elgarøy. His son, also named Øystein Elgarøy (born 1972), is a professor of astrophysics at the University of Oslo.
