= Finn Hudson =

Fictional character from the Fox series Glee

- Glee character
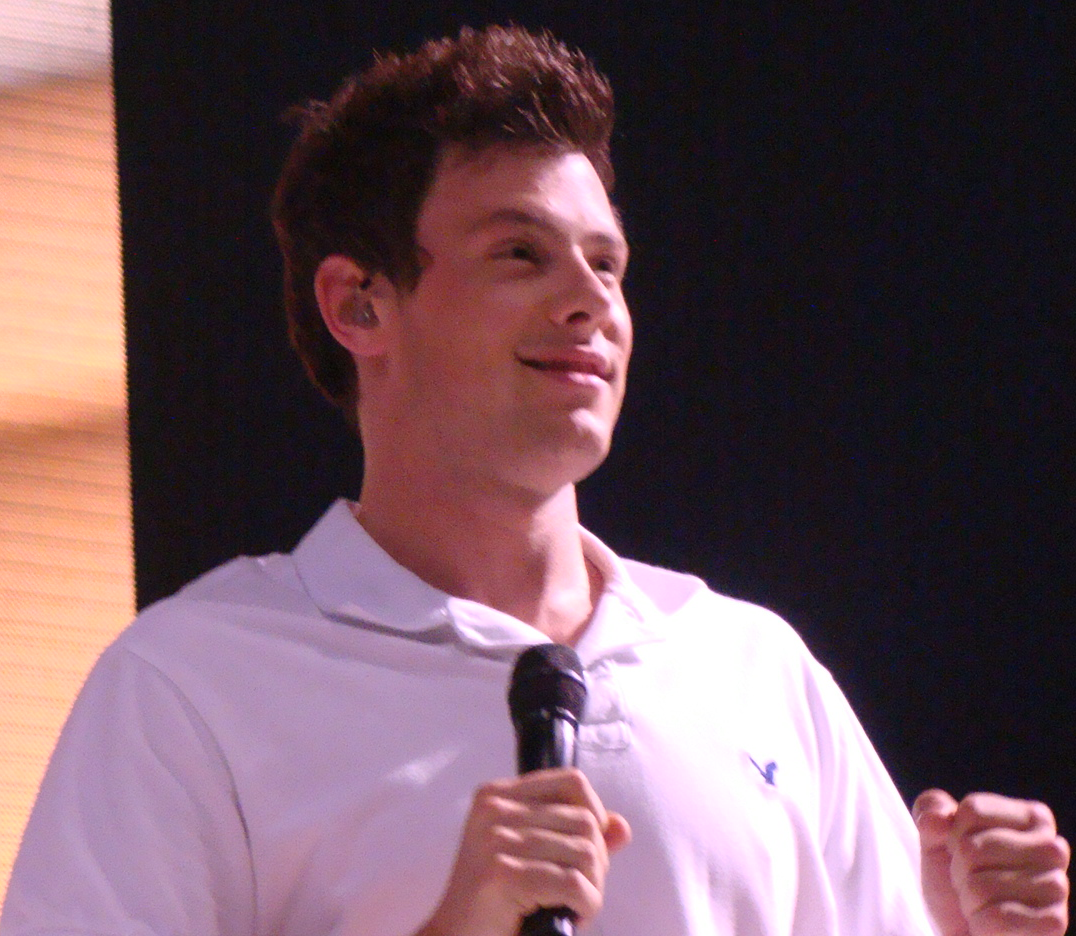
- Monteith performing as Finn during the Glee Live! In Concert! tour in Manchester, June 2011
- First appearance: "Pilot" (2009)
- Last appearance: "Sweet Dreams" (2013)
- Created by: Ryan Murphy; Brad Falchuk; Ian Brennan
- Portrayed by: Cory Monteith

In-universe information
- Occupation: Mechanic; Student; Glee Club Director
- Family: Christopher Hudson (father, deceased); Carole Hudson (mother); Burt Hummel (stepfather); Kurt Hummel (stepbrother); Blaine Anderson (stepbrother-in-law)
- Significant others: Rachel Berry (ex-fiancée); Quinn Fabray (ex-girlfriend)
- Status: Deceased

Finn Christopher Hudson is a fictional character from the Fox musical comedy-drama series Glee. The character was portrayed by Cory Monteith and first appeared on television when Glee premiered its pilot episode on Fox on May 19, 2009. Finn was developed by Glee creators Ryan Murphy, Brad Falchuk, and Ian Brennan. Glee follows the trials of the New Directions glee club at the fictional William McKinley High School in the town of Lima, Ohio. Finn is the quarterback of his high school football team the McKinley Titans. As a popular jock at the top of the school's social hierarchy, he is seen going along with his peers who bully the less popular students. He begins as a self centered hostile quarterback with a bad attitude. When he is forced to join the school's very unpopular glee club, he discovers that he loves it and chooses to continue in the club despite the risk of alienation by his friends for remaining a member.

His storylines often see him struggle with his decision to stay in the club, which is at the bottom of the social ladder, while he maintains his popular reputation and the respect of the other jocks. The character has dealt with his attraction to both the stunning, self centered head cheerleader Quinn Fabray (Dianna Agron) and ambitious glee club star singer Rachel Berry (Lea Michele), the series' female lead.

Following Monteith's death on July 13, 2013, it was announced that Finn's own death would occur in the third episode of the fifth season, titled "The Quarterback".

Monteith felt that Finn has had to grow up a lot during his time on the show. The actor said, "Finn started off as the stereotypical dumb jock but as the show has gone on, Finn's not dumb anymore, really, he's just a little naïve." Early reviews of Finn from television critics were mixed; Emily St. James of The A.V. Club said that he and Michele were "both agreeable and a little desperate for an outlet" in the pilot episode. Commenting on the fifth episode of the first season, Eric Goldman of IGN wrote, "We got to see a bit of a darker side to Finn [...] it's good to see this, because up until now, Finn's been a bit too straight-laced to totally invest in." In the second season's eighth episode, "Furt", Entertainment Weekly's Tim Stack said, "It's been a while since we’ve gotten some Finn focus, and I think I just missed Cory Monteith. But I also forgot what a good, natural actor he can be." Monteith as Finn won the 2011 Teen Choice Award for Choice TV: Actor Comedy, and was nominated in the same category in 2010.

Although he was not a singer before being cast as Finn, Monteith sang lead or joint lead on many songs on the show, most of which have charted in the US and abroad. "Jessie's Girl", which Finn performed as a solo, was certified gold in Australia, one of only three singles to do so from the show's releases in that country; he was joint lead on "Don't Stop Believin'" in the pilot episode, the show's first single sung by the glee club, which was certified gold and platinum in Australia and the US.

== Development ==
=== Casting and creation ===
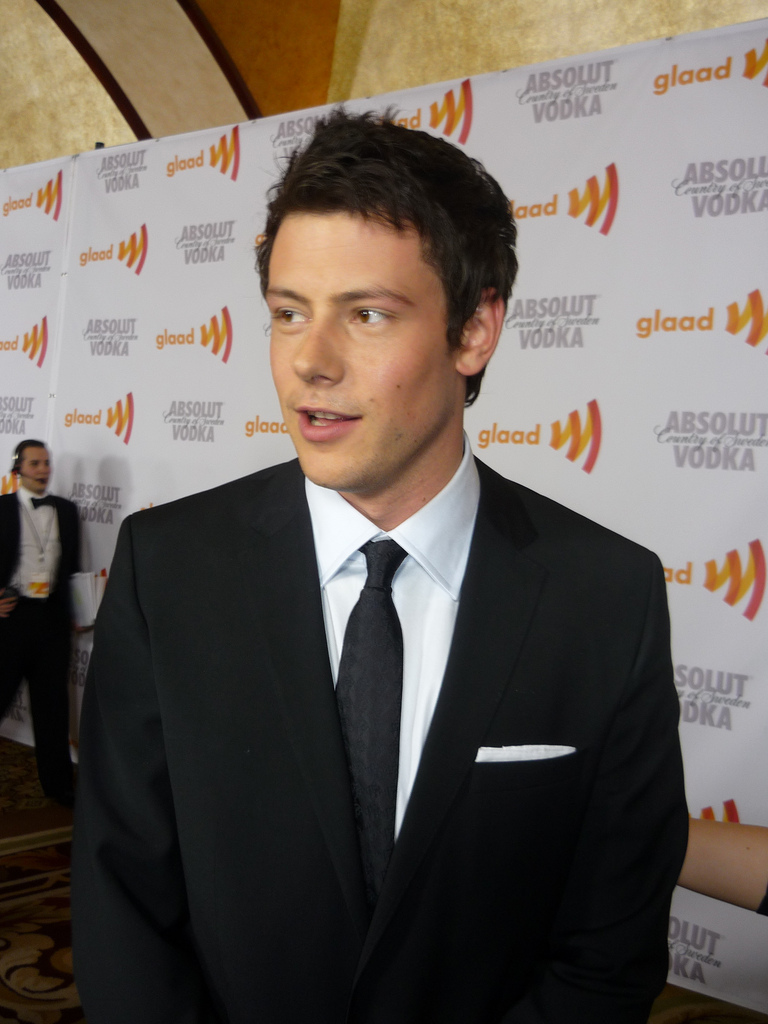
Cory Monteith at the 21st GLAAD Media Awards in 2010

Finn Hudson is portrayed by Cory Monteith. He has also been portrayed as a child by Jerry Phillips in "Pilot" and as a preschooler by Jake Vaughn in the episode "The Substitute". When Glee was being cast, Monteith's Vancouver agent, Elena Kirschner, submitted a video of him drumming with some pencils and Tupperware containers. Series creator (Ryan Murphy) took notice of the video, but pointed out that he had to be singing, as auditioning actors for Glee with no theatrical experience were required to prove they could sing and dance as well as act. Monteith submitted a second, musical tape, in which he sang "a cheesy, '80s music-video-style version" of REO Speedwagon's "Can't Fight This Feeling". He then attended a mass audition in Los Angeles; his vocal skills were considered weak, but he later performed very well with one of Glee's casting directors, who said that his audition captured the most elusive quality of Finn's, his "naive, but not stupid sweetness". Monteith said of his casting process, "I was like a lot of kids, looking for something to be interested in. Something to be passionate about. All you need is permission. Not only for Glee, but for anything in life." Jonathan Groff stated that the role was initially written for him, but turned it down because he didn't want to spend seven years as a singing teenager after having done two years on Spring Awakening.

In December 2010, Murphy announced that some members of the cast of Glee would be replaced after the end of the third season in spring 2012, to coincide with their graduation. Murphy said: "Every year we're going to populate a new group. There's nothing more depressing than a high schooler with a bald spot." He added, "I think you have to be true to the fact that here is a group of people who come and go in these teachers' lives." Although Murphy said in July 2011 that Monteith would be one of the actors leaving at the end of the third season, Falchuk later stated that while Monteith, along with Lea Michele and Chris Colfer, would graduate at the end of the third season, "because they're graduating doesn't mean they're leaving the show." Falchuk insisted that "it was never our plan or our intention to let them go.... They are not done with the show after this season."

=== Characterization ===
Finn originated as a character who "walks a fine line between following his dreams and balancing what other people expect of him." Monteith's former acting coach said: "You've got to be incredibly smart to understand how dim Finn can be", though Monteith appreciated the fact that Finn is more than "just a dumb jock". He has admitted that he is sometimes frustrated by Finn's "convenient dumb-guy writing", and commented, "I think every actor wants to be stretched. But it's also important to realize that whatever we're doing works. I realize that this happens to an actor about once every ten lifetimes. To be on a show that's this good, it's rarefied air." Finn has matured during his run on the series—in January 2011, Monteith noted that he had "grown up a little bit" and become "a little wiser". He later expanded, "Finn's not dumb anymore, really, he's just naive. The opposite of me. I love Finn's optimism. He's very idealistic; he wants a good girl to love him, and he chases after what he wants in life—that I can relate to." The actor hoped that in time his character would be able to grow and mature more. He said in an interview with MTV, "I think the harder it is for him, the better, you know? I think Finn has a lot of growing up to do and I think that Finn has a lot of struggle left for him. I think dealing with a lot of his dad stuff, the passing of his father and dealing with the unrequited love all of a sudden from Rachel, I think the more trouble he goes through, the more interesting it is for me as an actor."

Over the course of his run on the series, Finn's primary relationship has been with the glee club's main singer, Rachel. In a meeting with the press at PaleyFest2011, which occurred when the characters were in the middle of a months-long breakup, Monteith commented: "That's a very important central relationship to the show. I think it's important, and I think they're endgame, but I can't be sure of when. I try not to get too attached to the pairing, so I can focus on storyline that does come my way." Falchuk said of the Finn–Rachel relationship ahead of the third season, "We're not interested in breaking them up this year but at the same time the challenge is they are graduating, they are different kinds of people and where does that take you?" During the PaleyFest2011 Glee cast interview, Monteith said, "There are a lot of people who really, really want Finn and Rachel to be together. But at the same time, I think that it's really interesting when they're clearly in love with each other but they're apart. I think it makes for good television." He added, "I think there's a different dynamic to Finn with Quinn and with Rachel, and single."

== Storylines ==
=== Season 1 ===
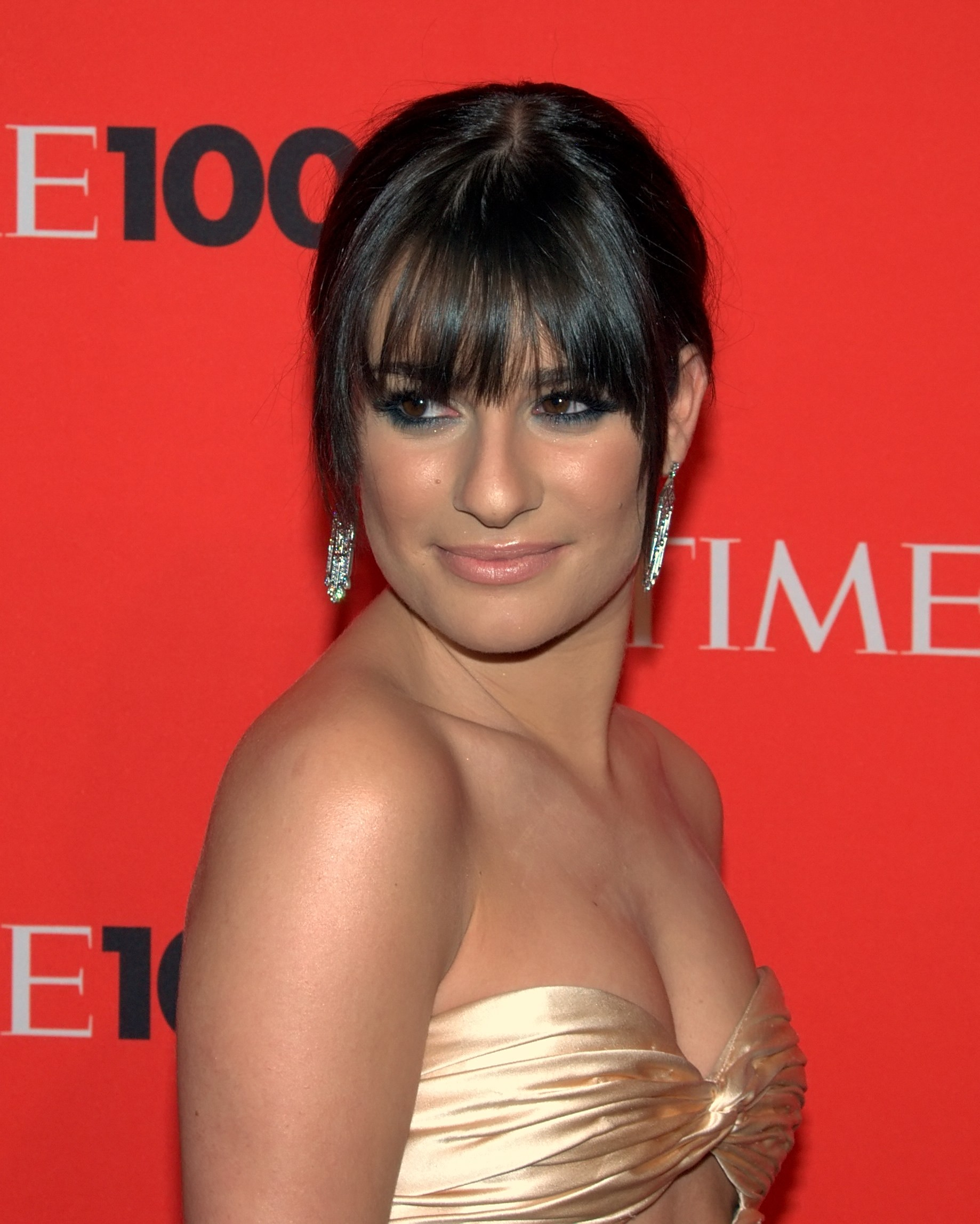
Finn's storylines have mainly revolved around that of glee club co-captain Rachel Berry (Lea Michele, pictured).

Finn is introduced as the stereotypical, self centered, unkind, ill tempered, and somewhat clueless popular jock, captain and quarterback of the William McKinley High School football team. Finn is seen as a 'go with the flow' character in the beginning, concerned more with popularity and reputation than exerting real leadership, but is also shown to have a conscience. He's aware of the bullying and pranking that he is expected to participate in, but he does his best to avoid or downplay his level of participation without actually taking a stand against it. For example, in his opening scene he stands by idly as his teammates throw Kurt Hummel (Chris Colfer) into a dumpster, but not before Finn first allows Kurt to remove an expensive designer jacket.

Finn is discovered singing in the locker room shower by his Spanish teacher/Glee Club Faculty Director Will Schuester (Matthew Morrison), who then blackmails him into joining the glee club in hopes that securing a popular, strong male lead will attract interest of other students and entice them to join the club as well as improving the overall status of the club.

Despite being ostracized by the other football players, including his best friend Puck (Mark Salling), Finn comes to enjoy being in the club. After rescuing Artie Abrams (Kevin McHale), who uses a wheelchair, from a bullying incident in a port-a-pottie, Finn finally begins to find his voice as a leader and takes a stand against bullying, proclaiming to Puck and the football team that both football and glee need him to succeed, therefore he will continue to do both.

Finn exercises his leadership skills, introducing the glee club members to the show's most identifiable quintessential song, Journey's Don't Stop Believin'. As Finn spends more time singing and rehearsing with female lead Rachel Berry (Lea Michele), it becomes apparent there is a growing attraction and strong musical chemistry between them, to the point where during vocal practice in the second episode "Showmance", he kisses Rachel in the auditorium. His decision to remain in glee worries his girlfriend, head cheerleader Quinn Fabray (Dianna Agron), who joins glee to keep an eye on him, afraid that Rachel's apparent interest in Finn may be reciprocated.

Quinn discovers that she is pregnant, and while she had cheated on Finn with Puck, she tells Finn that the baby is his, even though they never actually had intercourse. Due to Quinn joining the club and a perceived lack of acknowledgement of her talent from Mr. Schuester, Rachel quits glee club, leaving the team short a strong female lead and diminishing their chance of success at competitions. Realizing he needs to plan a future to support his child and hopeful to gain a music scholarship, Finn entices Rachel to return to glee club by using her feelings for him and invites her on a date to a bowling alley where they kiss again. Finn is increasingly conflicted by his feelings for Rachel while feeling obligated to stand by his responsibilities to Quinn and the baby. After convincing her to return to the club, Rachel learns of the pregnancy and confronts Finn, slapping him in the face and again refusing to rejoin the club. Quinn moves in with Finn and his mother Carole (Romy Rosemont) after Finn reveals her pregnancy to her parents through song, and they evict her. In episode 13 "Sectionals," Rachel figures out that Puck is the father and informs Finn, who then attacks Puck, breaks up with Quinn, and quits the glee club in a fury. However, after cheerleading coach Sue Sylvester (Jane Lynch) sabotages the glee club's first show choir competition, Finn is able to set aside his anger and return to lead the club to victory. He and Rachel briefly date, but he follows advice proffered by Mr. Schue and ends the relationship to focus on his own well-being. By the time Finn realizes that he truly does want to be with Rachel, he is chagrined to discover that she has started dating Jesse St. James (Jonathan Groff), the lead singer of rival glee club Vocal Adrenaline.

Cheerleader Santana Lopez (Naya Rivera) offers to take Finn's virginity to improve her social status and his, and he accepts, but afterward he regrets having done so and tells Rachel that he did not go through with it; she, in turn, falsely claims to have had sex with Jesse. Finn becomes increasingly jealous of Jesse, who had transferred schools to McKinley (supposedly to win Rachel's affections) and joined their glee club. When Rachel becomes ill in episode 18 "Laryngitis" and loses her singing voice, Finn takes her to the doctor and again confesses his feelings to her in an effort to win her back. At the next glee rehearsal, he sings Rick Springfield's "Jessie's Girl" in an obvious effort to prove his feelings to Rachel.

Fellow Glee club member Kurt, who is gay, has a private crush on Finn, and sets up his widower father Burt (Mike O'Malley) with Finn's widowed mother Carole (Romy Rosemont) in the hopes of spending more time with him. Finn initially opposes the relationship between his mom and Burt, worried that his mother will forget about his late father, but relents when Burt tells Finn that he loves Carole, though Kurt is dismayed by the deepening rapport between Finn and Burt. Finn and his mother eventually move in with the Hummels. Finn becomes uncomfortable rooming with Kurt, realizing he has a crush on him. During an argument, Finn uses a homophobic slur in reference to the way Kurt redecorated their shared space which is overheard by Burt, who then throws Finn out of his house. Finn is ashamed, and in episode 20 "Theatricality" makes amends by standing up for Kurt at school when he is victimized by bullies Azimio Adams (James Earl III) and Dave Karofsky (Max Adler).

By the time the club reach the next stage of show choir competitions, Jesse has betrayed Rachel and broken up with her, opening the door for Finn and Rachel to get back together. In the season finale, as Finn and Rachel are about to go onstage, Finn finally tells her that he loves her. They lose the competition but become a couple as of episode 22, Journey to Regionals.

=== Season 2 ===
At the beginning of the second season, Finn recruits new student Sam Evans (Chord Overstreet), who is also trying out for football, to join Glee. In an effort to help wheelchair-using Glee friend Artie Abrams (Kevin McHale) join the football team, Finn is misunderstood by new football coach Shannon Beiste (Dot-Marie Jones) to be making fun of her and she kicks him off the team. Sam makes the team and replaces Finn as quarterback, causing Finn to become jealous. Rachel is happy that Finn is not on the football team anymore, and when he tries to get back on the team, she gives him an ultimatum to choose her or football. Eventually she relents, and Finn is reinstated to the team and soon becomes quarterback again through the events of episode 3 "Grilled Cheesus". Bullying against Kurt has intensified, but Finn doesn't stand up for him, afraid of himself being bullied and that it may jeopardize his position as quarterback. When their parents marry, Finn uses his best man speech as an opportunity to apologize to Kurt, which begins a brotherly bond between the two. Rachel learns the truth about Finn sleeping with Santana. Hurt, she makes out with Puck to get even with Finn; she confesses her betrayal which causes Finn to break up with her.

The football team clinches a spot in the championship game, but animosity is running high between glee and the football team and harming the team's performance. In "The Sue Sylvester Shuffle", Coach Beiste and Will Schuester force the entire football team to join the glee club for a week to settle their differences and dispel their prejudices. After a promising start, the football team members eventually quit the club and as a result are banned from participating in the big game. At the same time, Sue arranges to have the cheerleading Regionals rescheduled to conflict with the football championship to sabotage both Beiste and Will, whose glee club now has to do the halftime show. With the football team down to half strength and the glee club without its cheerleader members, Finn again shows his strong leadership, settling his differences with Puck and having Puck convince the non-glee football players to perform in the halftime show, which will also get them back on the team, while Finn convinces Quinn, Santana, and Brittany (Heather Morris) to quit the Cheerios and support glee club by performing in the halftime show instead. The show is a great success, and the football team wins the championship game.

Emboldened by leading the team to the championship, Finn sets his eyes on a new prize: Quinn, who is currently dating Sam. Quinn had kissed Finn after the game having been impressed by his leadership abilities. Finn is convinced he can win her back by getting her to kiss him again. After setting up a kissing booth ostensibly to raise money for the glee club, Finn succeeds in kissing Quinn again and they begin secretly dating behind Sam's back, and much to the dismay of broken hearted Rachel, who is still trying to make amends and reunite with Finn. At the kissing booth, Rachel attempts to buy a kiss, which Finn gives as a peck on the cheek. He then gives her a star necklace he'd intended as a Christmas gift before they broke up, telling her he still believes in her even if they aren't together.

Finn and Quinn officially reunite after Sam finds out she cheated and breaks up with her. Finn wants to keep their reunion quiet to protect Rachel's feelings. Finn agrees to advise Rachel as she attempts to write an original song for their next Regionals competition. Rachel learns that Finn and Quinn have reunited and, after being confronted by Quinn about leaving Finn alone, she writes a personal song called "Get It Right" about wanting to fix her relationship with Finn. This leads to their victory at Regionals and gains Finn's attention at Rachel's obvious remorse for hurting him.

Finn and Quinn campaign together for junior prom king and queen. Meanwhile, Finn becomes jealous again when he learns that Jesse is back and going to prom with Rachel. Finn is seen rather sullen as Rachel sings "Jar of Hearts," suggesting that he cannot keep playing with her emotions. Finn is then kicked out of prom for fighting with Jesse over Rachel.

Finn and Kurt team up to arrange the funeral of Sue Sylvester's sister, Jean (Robin Trocki), when Sue is too upset to do so. Finn breaks up with Quinn immediately after the funeral, inspired by Sue's eulogy and realizing how deep his feelings are for Rachel. At Nationals in New York City, Finn attempts to win Rachel back by taking her on a romantic date in the city. She rejects him by the end of the date, choosing to focus on her future career instead of romance. Later, as the New Directions are about to go on stage, Finn begs Rachel to come back to him. Although she professes her love, she still reluctantly refuses him. By the end of their duet "Pretending", an original song written by Finn about their relationship, the audience responds with awkward silence as Rachel and Finn actually kiss on stage. The club consequently fails to place at Nationals due to the overly personal nature of the performance. Back in Ohio, Rachel tells Finn she doesn't regret the kiss, but reminds him she is moving to New York for college and will not be coming back. Finn reminds her that they have a whole year until graduation and they kiss, renewing their relationship.

=== Season 3 ===
As the new school year begins, Finn, a senior, has trouble figuring out what he wants to do with his life after graduation. In the fifth episode, "The First Time", Finn is not recruited to play football in college, as he had hoped. He and Rachel decide to have sex together for the first time. In the episode "Mash Off", Santana, who has joined the rival Troubletones, is relentlessly bullying Finn. After a fake apology pushes him to the edge, Finn tells her to just "come out of the closet" and accuses her of being a coward for tearing other people down only because she can't admit to everyone that she's in love with Brittany. They are overheard by a girl whose uncle is running against Sue in a congressional campaign, and he uses Santana's lesbianism—because she's Sue's cheerleading co-captain—against Sue in a campaign commercial, effectively publicly "outing" her. Santana, devastated by this, slaps Finn during Glee rehearsals, but he later claims it was a fake "stage slap" to prevent her from being suspended. In the episode "Yes/No", Finn asks Rachel to marry him. Rachel hesitates to answer at first, but Finn serenades her in the episode "Michael" and she ultimately agrees to marry him. In the episode "On My Way", the wedding is set for after the Regionals competition, which New Directions wins, but it is canceled after Quinn is badly injured in a car crash on her way to the ceremony. Finn works hard on his dancing skills in preparation for their upcoming Nationals competition, while also offering support and encouragement to Rachel, who had choked during her initial NYADA audition, but was getting a second chance during the competition. Finn is so confident of their impending win at Nationals he bets their honeymoon money on the win with Rick the Stick Nelson. Following their win at Nationals, they move the wedding date until after graduation, with a plan to move to New York together to attend their respective colleges. However, when Finn fails to get into his New York acting school, Rachel - who was accepted to her school - offers to defer a year to help him reapply. Meanwhile, Finn learns his mother has lied about his father's death, which was actually due to a drug overdose likely connected to untreated PTSD following dishonorable discharge from the army and not killed in action as a hero. He decides he needs to defend his father's legacy and prove he was really a hero. Finn is seen spiraling into a crisis of conscience by the end of the season, with fear of having no direction and becoming a 'Lima Loser' or worse - following the footsteps of his father into drugs and suicide - while also fearing he will only hold Rachel back from achieving her goals. In the season finale "Goodbye", the paths of Finn's separate story arcs finally converge and Finn makes the ultimate personal sacrifice. He refuses to allow Rachel to jeopardize her future dreams as a Broadway performer, and on what was supposed to be the day of their wedding, instead sends her off on a train to New York without him, telling her that he has enlisted in the army and is "setting her free".

=== Season 4 ===
Finn has not been in touch with Rachel or Kurt all summer and into the fall—the two friends are now rooming together in Brooklyn while Rachel is attending NYADA—but he reappears unexpectedly at the end of the third episode. He has been given an early discharge from the army after injuring himself. He finds out she kissed Brody (Dean Geyer), a NYADA junior, and feels that he doesn't belong in her world in New York, so he returns to Lima without telling her. She then breaks up with him. In Lima, Finn is working at Burt's tire shop again, and Artie enlists his help to co-direct the school musical, Grease, which had been Finn's suggestion. When Rachel comes to see the musical in the "Glease" episode, their reunion does not go well, and they agree to refrain from contact when Rachel visits Lima in the future. Will takes a leave of absence from McKinley to be a member of a blue-ribbon panel in Washington, DC, so starting in "Dynamic Duets", Finn becomes the interim director of New Directions. While he has a rocky start in the position, they come to accept him as their leader. At Sectionals, the glee club loses to the Warblers after Marley (Melissa Benoist) passes out on stage, interrupting the performance. Afterward, Finn does what he can to keep the club together and finally succeeds despite Sue's opposition—she has deprived New Directions of rehearsal space at school. With the help of Blaine Anderson (Darren Criss), Finn is able to prove The Warblers cheated which gets them disqualified. New Directions is again eligible to compete in Regionals and the choir room is returned to them. Finn enlists Emma, who is deep in wedding preparations in advance of Will's return, to help him judge a glee club competition for which member is the best diva. When he finds her panicking over the reception arrangements, he kisses her. In "I Do", when Emma flees the church the day of the wedding, Finn blames himself, but Rachel sets him straight. The reception goes on despite the failed wedding, where Finn delivers a speech to Rachel, clearly stating his intent for them to eventually reunite and tells her that they are endgame. Finn and Rachel then sing a duet and later sleep with each other. In "Girls (and Boys) On Film", Finn teams up with Artie to help find Emma for Will; he later confesses to Will that he kissed Emma, and Will is unable to forgive him. Since working with Will is untenable, Finn leaves New Directions though he enjoyed directing them; Marley tells him he's a good teacher, and he should get a teaching degree. He goes to college, where he shares a dorm room with Puck—who isn't actually attending the school. Will later asks Finn to return to co-lead New Directions, and he agrees. Meanwhile, Santana has discovered that Brody, who is now living with Rachel, is a gigolo, and tells Finn, who goes to New York and warns Brody away, ultimately beating him up and saying, "Stay away from my future wife." When Rachel finds out and breaks up with Brody, she admits that the relationship never would have worked because she was using it to try to get over her heartache and to make Finn jealous. Rachel later thanks Finn for his intervention in "Sweet Dreams" when she calls him to get advice for choosing an audition song for the upcoming Broadway revival of Funny Girl. During her audition, she takes Finn's advice to choose a very personal song and performs "Don't Stop Believin'", while the original six Glee members are seen performing with her on stage in Glee 'dream state' including Finn playing drums and singing. This marked Finn's final appearance and performance on the show.

=== Season 5 ===
"The Quarterback", the third episode of the fifth season, opens three weeks after Finn's funeral. No cause of death is given. Kurt, in a voiceover, explains that it is not the circumstances of Finn's death that matter, but how he lived his life. A memorial tree is planted on the campus at McKinley High along with a commemorative plaque in his honor. A grieving Rachel returns to Lima wearing her 'Finn' necklace, and presents a photo plaque of Finn to Mr. Schuester with Finn's famous quote from season 2 "the show's gotta go all over the place or something" and they hang it in the choir room. From this point forward, Finn's image and memory are occasionally referenced throughout the remainder of the series.

In the eleventh episode "City of Angels," Finn is honored at the National show choir competition in Los Angeles. Finn's parents are in attendance as chaperones as New Directions performs all Finn's favorite songs for the competition, where Sam holds up Finn's drumsticks at the end of their performance. During the competition a scandal unfolds as Finn's photo plaque - which was brought along as both reminder and inspiration - is stolen by their rival choir in an effort to sabotage New Direction's performance. The plaque is eventually recovered after the competition.

=== Season 6 ===
In the flashback episode "2009", the original Glee club members have second thoughts about Finn being in the club. After talking about how different Finn is from the other school jocks and recognizing he is more like them, they decide to let him stay in the club. The scene moves to the New Directions including Finn, singing Don't Stop Believing from the previously aired "Pilot" episode. In the series finale "Dreams Come True", U.S. Vice President Sue Sylvester rededicates the McKinley High auditorium to be renamed the Finn Hudson Memorial Auditorium.

== Musical performances ==
As Finn is the most frequent male lead in New Directions numbers, Monteith features in a great many musical performances which have been released as singles available for digital download and are also featured in the show's soundtrack albums. He frequently shares vocal leads with the main female singer, Rachel, as in the pilot episode's closing song, Journey's "Don't Stop Believin'", the single of which has sold over a million copies and been certified platinum in the US and Australia.

Like Finn, Monteith was a novice singer when the show started. In an interview with GQ's Alex Pappademus, he noted that, early on, "you could hear the Auto-Tune." He was not called on to sing much on the first few episodes, as he rapped in "Push It" for "Showmance", had a short solo phrase in the song "I Wanna Sex You Up" in "Acafellas", and was not featured as a vocal lead in "Preggers". Over the next three episodes, he shares the lead on four group numbers. Two are with Rachel and One with Artie, Rachel, and Mercedes: Queen's "Somebody to Love", "No Air" and "Keep Holding On". The fourth is a boys-only mash-up of Bon Jovi's "It's My Life" with Usher's "Confessions Part II", where Finn sings lead on the "It's My Life" sections and Artie on the rest.

Excluding a scene from the pilot of him singing a portion of "Can't Fight This Feeling" in the shower, Finn's first solo songs are not until the show's tenth episode, "Ballad". Finn sings "I'll Stand By You" to the unborn child he thinks is his, and later sings "(You're) Having My Baby" to Quinn, the mother of the child, in front of her parents. He has two solo numbers later in the season: "Hello, I Love You" by The Doors, characterized by Bobby Hankinson of the Houston Chronicle as "one of Finn's best vocal performances to date", and "Jessie's Girl" by Rick Springfield; the latter song charted in the top ten in Australia, Canada and Ireland, and was certified gold in Australia, one of only three singles from Glee to have received gold certification in that country.

Finn sings lead more frequently in the second half of the first season, as he is featured in over a dozen songs, including several with Rachel. However, in Glee's second season, he sings lead in fewer songs than in the first, though he again sings a significant proportion with Rachel, including the duets "Don't Go Breaking My Heart", "With You I'm Born Again", "Last Christmas", and the one ostensibly written by Finn at the end of the season, "Pretending". His first solo performance of the second season, in the episode "Grilled Cheesus", is R.E.M.'s "Losing My Religion". Monteith said he and series music producer Adam Anders "had a bit of a different idea" about how the song should be performed. While Anders "always brings the songs in very positive, very upbeat", he felt the song "was expressing a betrayal", and with Finn feeling both betrayal and anger, Monteith wanted his performance to reflect that. Anthony Benigno of the Daily News commented positively on the arrangement of Monteith's song, and graded the performance an "A", but Erica Futterman of Rolling Stone was critical of the arrangement, and said Monteith's performance was "more awkward than inspired." Finn's other solo is Sammy Davis' "I've Gotta Be Me" in the episode "Born This Way".

In the episode "Furt", when Finn's mother marries Kurt's father and the glee club provides music for the wedding, two of the songs are by Bruno Mars: "Marry You", which is sung by the entire club as a big processional production number, and "Just the Way You Are", which is sung by Finn to Kurt at the reception. Raymund Flandez of The Wall Street Journal characterized the "two Bruno Mars songs" as "brilliant in execution and touching in sentiment", and Futterman agreed: "the Bruno Mars songs gave the show two of its best performances this season". While Benigno and Stack also praised "Just the Way You Are", and both gave the song an "A", Jen Harper of BuddyTV thought Monteith's vocals as Finn "aren't the strongest" and AOL TV's Jean Bentley also wished Finn had not been the soloist. In "The Sue Sylvester Shuffle", Finn led his football teammates, some of whom were performing with the glee club under duress, in The Zombies' "She's Not There". St. James called it "one of the better numbers of the season", and Futterman felt that Monteith's vocals were a "perfect fit" for the song. Finn's sole duet with Quinn, Fleetwood Mac's "I Don't Want to Know" from the episode "Rumours", was given an "A−" by Entertainment Weekly's Sandra Gonzalez, and Futterman said it was "better than Quinn and Sam's 'Lucky'", which she had called "charming" when it was performed in "Duets".

== Reception ==
=== Critical response ===
The character of Finn has gotten mixed to positive reviews from television critics. St. James praised the "terrific" cast in the pilot episode, and wrote that Monteith and Michele "are both agreeable and a little desperate for an outlet as the show choir's central two singers". The Chicago Tribune's Maureen Ryan opined that "Cory Monteith gives quarterback Finn Hudson a jock-ish authority mixed with an appealingly square naivete." Korbi Ghosh of Zap2it enjoyed Finn's "sweet nature" and observed, "it's clear that at Finn's core, he's a good person." Shawna Malcom of the Los Angeles Times noted a contradiction in his characterization in the episode "Preggers"—she questioned whether the intelligence he demonstrated in striving for a football scholarship was incongruent in a character who believed he had impregnated Quinn by sharing a hot tub with her.

Goldman welcomed the emergence of Finn's "darker side" as he manipulated Rachel in "The Rhodes Not Taken", as "up until now, Finn's been a bit too straight-laced to totally invest in". Denise Martin of the Los Angeles Times added, "Did anyone not want to kill Finn for coming on to Rachel to get her to come back to the club? (Yes, the logic was there. He wants to win a scholarship so he can provide for the baby he thinks is his. But a girl's heart is a fragile thing, and like Rachel tells him, he could have just tried being honest.)" In his review of "Ballad", Goldman commented: "Finn singing 'I'll Stand By You' to the unborn baby he thinks is his was very sweet". He found the scene that followed Finn's revelation of Quinn's pregnancy to her parents the grimmest on Glee to that point. The intense sequence featuring Finn, Kurt and Burt in "Theatricality" garnered praise for Monteith from James Poniewozik of Time, who wrote: "One thing I love about his performance, here and throughout Glee, is that he plays Finn as a kid, which of course he still is. He's basically a good kid, but as his 'faggy' outburst shows, he's flawed and often overwhelmed. And while he has little to do during Burt's lecture but react, his reactions are great: he's scared and defensive, but shows Finn's guilt at the same time."

When Finn's mother marries Kurt's father in the second season's eighth episode, "Furt", Stack was pleased to see Finn being featured: "It's been a while since we’ve gotten some Finn focus, and I think I just missed Cory Monteith. But I also forgot what a good, natural actor he can be." While giving "The Sue Sylvester Shuffle" episode a "C" grade, St. James wrote as an aside, "Let's pause for a moment to give Cory Monteith some praise, though, since he was asked to do a lot of difficult things in this episode, in regards to selling the idea of Finn as a leader, bringing disparate groups together, and he mostly managed that task, much better than he has in past episodes." While reviewing "Funeral", the season's penultimate episode, Gonzalez said, "I was glad that the writers chose [...] Finn and Kurt to be the ones to connect with Sue because I think they're two of the most genuine characters on the show. [...] I think they pulled it off well." In his review of "Funeral", St. James noted that Finn was not the best vocalist among the male students: "the show hits on something very odd in its DNA: Finn continues to be the male lead of the group because he's the male lead of the show, less because he's the best singer New Directions has. [...] But because he's trying to get better, that's OK".

At the conclusion of the second season, Poniewozik wrote that he had not found the relationship between Finn and Rachel "the most compelling story" of the season, and as such "didn't enjoy 'New York' as much as [he] might have", and St. James commented that their storyline had "ceased being too interesting long ago." However, the former conceded "I may not be that invested in Finn/Rachel, but the startling moment where the audience disappeared in the middle of their kiss made me feel like I was", and the latter opined that their kiss resonated, despite being unoriginal and "too neat way of suggesting that Rachel can't have both Finn and her Broadway dreams".

=== Accolades ===
Monteith won the 2011 Teen Choice Award in the Choice TV: Actor Comedy category for his portrayal of Finn, and was a member of the Glee cast ensemble given the Outstanding Performance by an Ensemble in a Comedy Series award at the 16th Screen Actors Guild Awards. He received several other nominations for the role, including Teen Choice Awards in 2009 for Choice TV: Breakout Star Male and in 2010 for Choice TV: Comedy Actor, and the 17th Screen Actors Guild Awards ensemble nomination for Outstanding Performance by an Ensemble in a Comedy Series.
