= Finn Christensen (artist) =

Norwegian painter and graphic artist

Finn Christensen (26 February 1920 – 28 February 2009) was a Norwegian painter and graphic artist.

He was born in Kristiania and attended the Norwegian National Academy of Fine Arts from 1945 to 1947. He had several substantial decorating assignments, among others at hospitals (Rikshospitalet 1964, Ullevål and Aker 1969), churches (Lambertseter 1967, Åssiden 1968) and NRK. The National Gallery of Norway owns the relief Relieff (1971–72) and nine drawings; works were also bought by Riksgalleriet, Gothenburg Museum of Art, Nationalmuseum, Statens Museum for Kunst and the Museum of Modern Art. He was a member of the Arts Council Norway from 1985 to 1988.
