= Finn Hiorthøy =

Norwegian judge (1903–1991)

Finn Hiorthøy (1903–1991) was a Norwegian judge.

He graduated with the cand.jur. degree in 1926, and then worked as a deputy judge in Nord-Hedmark for some time before being hired in the Norwegian Ministry of Justice and the Police in 1930. His specialty was constitutional law and international law, and he represented Norway internationally. He also wrote books and articles. From 1942 to 1945, during World War II, Hiorthøy stayed in London where he aided the Norwegian government-in-exile. He was promoted to deputy under-secretary of state in the Ministry of Justice in 1945, and represented Norway as an advisor in the United Nations, NATO and the Council of Europe.

In 1955, he was named as a Supreme Court Justice. He served in this position until his retirement in 1973. He died in 1991.
