= Preggers =

- Glee episode
- Episode no.: Season 1 Episode 4
- Directed by: Brad Falchuk
- Written by: Brad Falchuk
- Production code: 1ARC03
- Original air date: September 23, 2009

Guest appearances
- Stephen Tobolowsky as Sandy Ryerson; Patrick Gallagher as Ken Tanaka; Mike O'Malley as Burt Hummel; Iqbal Theba as Principal Figgins; Jennifer Aspen as Kendra Giardi; Kurt Fuller as Mr. McClung; Naya Rivera as Santana Lopez; Heather Morris as Brittany Pierce; Harry Shum Jr. as Mike Chang; Dijon Talton as Matt Rutherford; Bill A. Jones as Rod Remington; Earlene Davis as Andrea Carmichael

Episode chronology
← Previous "Acafellas"	Next → "The Rhodes Not Taken"
- Glee season 1

"Preggers" is the fourth episode of the American television series Glee. The episode premiered on the Fox network on September 23, 2009, and was written and directed by executive producer Brad Falchuk. "Preggers" sees glee club member Kurt (Chris Colfer) join the football team and come out as gay to his father, Burt (Mike O'Malley). Cheerleader Quinn (Dianna Agron) discovers she is pregnant and tells her boyfriend Finn (Cory Monteith) the baby is his, when in fact the father is his best friend Puck (Mark Salling). Faculty members Sue Sylvester (Jane Lynch) and Sandy Ryerson (Stephen Tobolowsky) team up in an effort to bring down the glee club, luring away a disillusioned Rachel (Lea Michele), who quits when club director Will (Matthew Morrison) refuses to award her a solo song. This episode features the first appearance of O'Malley as Burt Hummel.

"Preggers" features covers of two songs, and several dance performances of Beyoncé's "Single Ladies (Put a Ring on It)". A studio recording of Michele's cover of "Taking Chances" was released as a single, available for digital download and features on the album Glee: The Music, Volume 1. The scene in which Kurt comes out to his father was based on the personal experience of series creator Ryan Murphy. Murphy's intention was to move away from previous shows he has worked on in which gay characters have not been given happy endings, by allowing Kurt to succeed and be accepted.

The episode was watched by 6.64 million United States viewers and received mixed reviews from critics. Shawna Malcom of the Los Angeles Times praised the show's fast pacing; however, The New York Times's Mike Hale felt that key characters were not given enough screen time. The football team's performance of "Single Ladies" and Kurt's coming out to his father were generally well received; however, Rachel's actions garnered little sympathy, and several reviewers commented negatively on Quinn's pregnancy, with Eric Goldman of IGN deeming it "a very soap opera plotline". However, the episode has grown in stature in later years, with many recognizing it as a key episode in building the major plotlines for the show's first season. In 2020, it was included on The Ringer's list of the 100 best television episodes of the 21st century.

== Plot ==
Glee club member Kurt Hummel (Chris Colfer) is caught dancing to Beyoncé's "Single Ladies" by his father Burt (Mike O'Malley), and claims that it is a football exercise, and that he is now part of the team. Fellow glee club member and football quarterback Finn Hudson (Cory Monteith) helps Kurt to practice, and finds him to be a skilled kicker. Finn convinces coach Ken Tanaka (Patrick Gallagher) to let Kurt try out for the team. Ken is delighted to find such an asset for the team and adds Kurt as the kicker.

Finn's girlfriend Quinn Fabray (Dianna Agron) tells him she is pregnant, claiming her pregnancy as a result of Finn's premature ejaculation when they made out in Quinn's hot tub. Finn worries that his future prospects will be diminished by fatherhood. He asks glee club director Will Schuester (Matthew Morrison) to coach the football team at dancing, believing it will help them to improve, increasing his chances of securing a football scholarship. Finn confides Quinn's news to his best friend Puck (Mark Salling), who later confronts Quinn, claiming to be the baby's father, since she said she was a virgin when they had sex. Quinn rejects Puck, calling him a "Lima loser" who could never support her and the baby like Finn. Will's wife Terri (Jessalyn Gilsig) reveals to her sister Kendra (Jennifer Aspen) that she experienced a hysterical pregnancy and is not really carrying Will's baby. Kendra suggests that they acquire a baby, and when Terri learns of Quinn's pregnancy from Will, she confronts her, asking questions about her prenatal care.

Cheerleading coach Sue Sylvester (Jane Lynch) approaches former glee club director Sandy Ryerson (Stephen Tobolowsky) and enlists him in her plan to sabotage the club. She blackmails Principal Figgins (Iqbal Theba) into appointing Sandy as the school's new Arts director, and together they hold auditions for a school production of Cabaret, hoping to entice away the glee club's star, Rachel Berry (Lea Michele). Rachel feels slighted when Will awards Tina Cohen-Chang (Jenna Ushkowitz) a solo that she wanted, so she auditions for the musical and is given the lead role. When Will refuses to reassign the solo to Rachel, she quits the club.

The football team puts their dance training into practice by performing the "Single Ladies" routine in the middle of a game, confusing and distracting the opposition, and with Kurt's help is able to win. Buoyed by his success, Kurt comes out to his father Burt and tells him that he's gay; Burt tells him he knew all along and loves Kurt just the same.

== Production ==
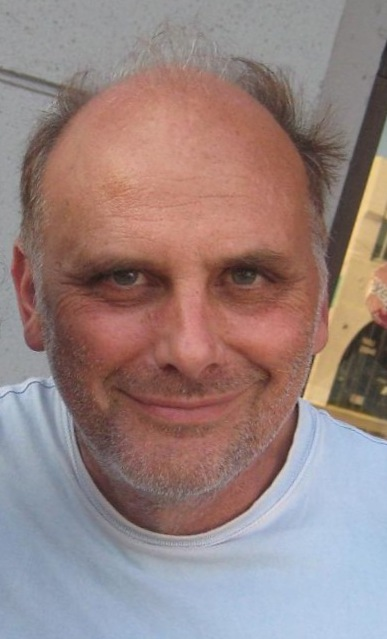
Kurt Fuller (pictured) made a guest appearance in "Preggers" as local news station owner Mr. McClung.

"Preggers" was written and directed by Glee's executive producer and co-creator Brad Falchuk. Kurt Fuller guest stars as local news station owner Mr. McClung. The episode features covers of "Taking Chances" by Celine Dion and "Tonight" from West Side Story. Beyoncé's "Single Ladies (Put a Ring on It)" is also featured in several dance performances. Kurt's backup dancers for "Single Ladies (Put a Ring on It)" are series regular Tina (Jenna Ushkowitz) and recurring character Brittany (Heather Morris). Dancer Morris was one of Beyonce's backup dancers for "Single Ladies (Put a Ring on It)" appearing on The Today Show, Ellen, and others. A studio recording of "Taking Chances" was released as a single, available for digital download, and appeared on the album Glee: The Music, Volume 1. The track charted at number 79 in Australia, 73 in Canada and 71 in the United States.

The scene in which Kurt comes out to his father was taken verbatim from series creator Ryan Murphy's own life. Murphy felt that the scene was "a great thing to put on television", as, while audiences have seen gay characters isolated and attacked, they have rarely seen them ultimately winning and triumphing. He commented that: "The show is about making you feel good in the end. It's about happy endings and optimism and the power of your personal journey and making you feel that the weird thing about me is the great thing about me. I’ve done other shows with gay characters, and I will say that in many of those cases, the gay characters didn't have a happy ending. And I thought you know what? Enough." Colfer has commented that his biggest challenge was in ensuring the scene felt "honest" and not comical or "used as a punchline". He explained: "I think it's probably the first time a character's sexuality has been respected and almost dignified in a way, and I think that's really important, and there needs to be more of that on TV."

== Reception ==
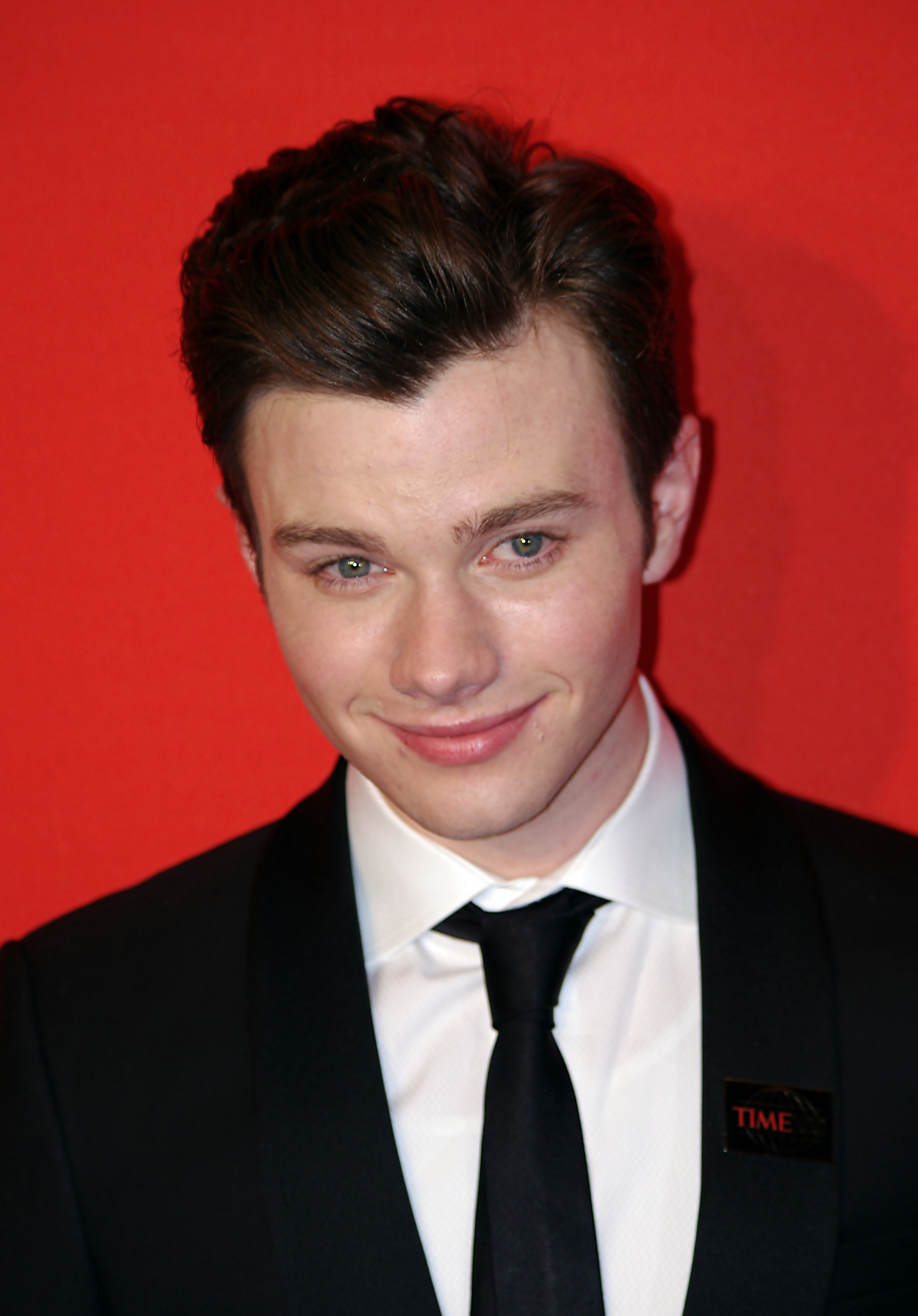
Colfer's performance in Kurt's coming out scene was well received by critics.

"Preggers" was watched by 6.64 million United States viewers and attained a 3.1/8 rating/share in the 18-49 demographic. It was the twenty-second most watched show in Canada for the week of broadcast, with 1.39 million viewers. In the UK, the episode was watched by 1.804 million viewers (1.397 million on E4, and 407,000 on timeshift), becoming the most-watched show on E4 and E4+1 for the week, and the most-watched show on cable for the week, as well as the most watched episode of the series at the time. The episode received mixed reviews from critics. Shawna Malcom for the Los Angeles Times reviewed the episode positively, praising the football team's performance of the "Single Ladies" dance and Kurt coming out to his father. Malcom also commented positively on the show's fast pacing; however, Mike Hale of the New York Post was less favorable, deeming the episode "overstuffed with story lines". He felt that key characters did not receive enough screentime, and that: "There was so much exposition going on that there didn’t seem to be much room for laughs."

Tim Stack for Entertainment Weekly wrote that, although the dancing in the episode was fun, "Preggers" was lacking in "big singing moments" apart from Rachel's performance of "Taking Chances". He deemed Quinn's pregnancy "a good dramatic twist", but hoped that it would not be a long-lasting storyline. Eric Goldman of IGN rated the episode 8.8 out of 10. He called the "Single Ladies" performance "a memorable TV moment", and wrote that Quinn's pregnancy was a "very soap opera plotline" however commented: "luckily Glee is the kind of show to handle it with humor."

James Poniewozik for Time deemed Kurt's coming out "beautifully handled", commenting: "the fact that Dad (Mike O'Malley, who has turned out to be a pretty good character actor) ends up not being the boor we think he's going to be is one of the first signs that Glee is growing up as a series, that having established a world of primary-color stereotypes, it's now willing to subvert those expectations." Raymund Flandez of The Wall Street Journal criticized Rachel's actions in the episode, and felt that: "Rachel has become insufferable. The disagreements with Mr. Schue about her own development as a bona fide triple-threat have branded her as an overbearing prima donna to the rest of Glee."

The comedic pairing of Sue and Sandy attracted some praise, with Stack deeming them "the best villains ever". Goldman said that: "Tobolowsky is terrific in this role, as Sandy manages to make everything he says [...] sound amazingly disturbing." Hale criticized Lynch as Sue, however, writing that she gave a "one-note performance", suggesting that she had been miscast in the role.
