= Finnur Garðarsson =

Icelandic swimmer

Personal information
- Born: 20 March 1952 (age 74)

Sport
- Sport: Swimming

Finnur Garðarsson (born 20 March 1952) is an Icelandic former freestyle swimmer. He competed in two events at the 1972 Summer Olympics.
