= Finn Christensen (footballer) =

Danish footballer (born 1962)

Personal information
- Full name: Finn Vind Christensen
- Date of birth: 25 March 1962 (age 64)
- Place of birth: Denmark
- Position: Midfielder

Youth career
- Vejle Boldklub

Senior career*
Years	Team	Apps	(Gls)
	Vejle Boldklub	457	(27)
- Ikast FS
- Vejle Boldklub

International career
1982	Denmark U21	3	
- * Club domestic league appearances and goals

Finn Christensen (born 25 March 1962) is a Danish former footballer.

== Biography ==
Finn Christensen played most of his career in Vejle Boldklub. However, in 1984 he played a single season for Ikast FS. The same year Vejle won the Danish Championship.

In the 1990s Finn was captain of a young Vejle Boldklub team that won silver medals in 1997 and played in the UEFA Cup twice. In this period Finn was the gran old man who controlled the game from his midfield position. His impact on the team made him a popular figure among the fans, who nicknamed him Ferrari Finn.

With 457 matches Finn is number three on the alltime match record list in Vejle Boldklub. Only Gert Eg and Knud Herbert Sørensen have played more games for the club.
