= Lambertseter Church =

Coordinates: 59°52′12.385″N 10°48′48.996″E

- Lambertseter kirke
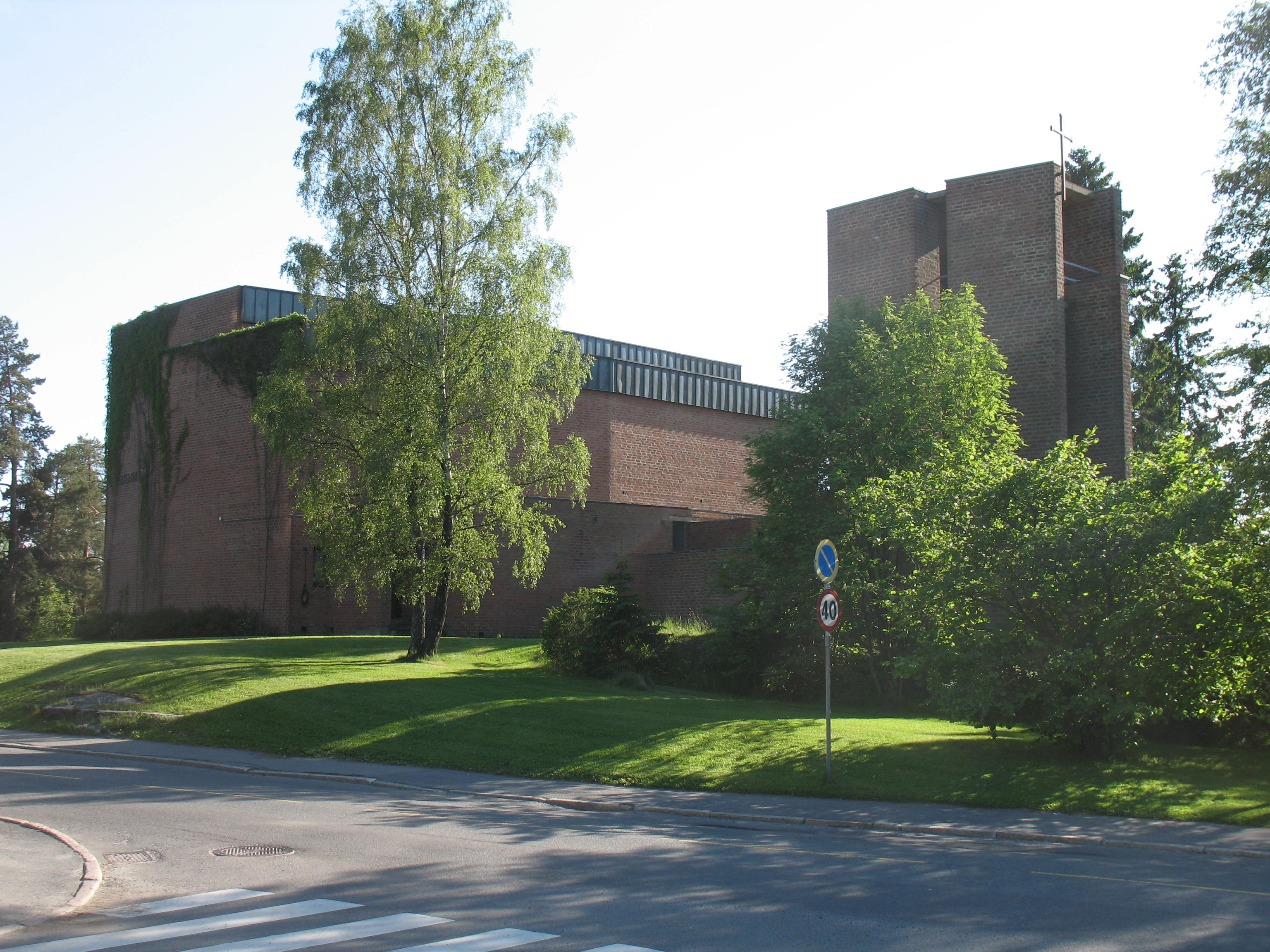

- Location within Oslo Location within Norway
- Location: Langbølgen 33, Lambertseter, Oslo,
- Country: Norway
- Denomination: Church of Norway
- Churchmanship: Evangelical Lutheran
- Website: kirken.no/lambertseter

History
- Status: Parish church
- Consecrated: 1966

Architecture
- Functional status: Active
- Architect: Harald Hille

Specifications
- Capacity: 400 seats
- Materials: brick, concrete

Administration
- Diocese: Diocese of Oslo
- Deanery: Søndre Aker
- Parish: Lambertseter

Lambertseter Church is a church center in Oslo, Norway.

The church center from 1966 contains distinctive art in the church room, congregation hall and chapel. The seven meter high altarpiece is in brass, copper, steel, iron and glass delivered to the church's consecration, one of the artist Finn Christensen's main works.

The wall in the congregation hall is adorned with a large work of glass and steel by Benny Motzfeldt on loan from the Oslo municipal art collection from 2003. The chapel has an altarpiece by Tor Lindrupsen (2000) who also made the sandblasted window in the choir at the church room's baptismal font (1997). In 1999, eight new chandeliers were mounted into the church. The church organ has 20 voices. The stone reliefs on the southern long wall are created by Einar Stoltenberg.

The church building is in reinforced concrete, the facades are dazzled with brick. The roofs are flat.

Next to the church is a separate bell tower. There are three church bells, created by Olsen Nauen Bell Foundry in 1966. The bells are named "Faith", "Hope" and the largest church bell, "Love".

Lambertseter Church is listed by the Norwegian Directorate for Cultural Heritage.
