= List of Glee episodes =

Glee logo

Glee is an American musical comedy-drama television series that aired on Fox. It was created by Ryan Murphy, Brad Falchuk, and Ian Brennan. The pilot episode of the series was broadcast on May 19, 2009, and the rest of the first season began on September 9, 2009. Fox initially ordered thirteen episodes of Glee, picking the show up for a full season on September 21, 2009, ordering nine more episodes. The remainder of the first season aired for nine consecutive weeks starting on April 13, 2010, and ending on June 8, 2010, when the season finale was broadcast.

The series focuses on a high school show choir, also known as a glee club, in the fictional William McKinley High School in Lima, Ohio. Will Schuester (Matthew Morrison) takes over the glee club after the former teacher (Stephen Tobolowsky) is fired for inappropriate contact with a male student. With a rag-tag group of misfit teenagers, Will attempts to restore the glee club to its former glory while tending to his developing feelings for his co-worker Emma (Jayma Mays), as well as defending the glee club's existence from the conniving cheerleading coach Sue Sylvester (Jane Lynch). A major focus of the series is the students in the glee club: their relationships as couples, their love of singing and desire for popularity coming into conflict due to their membership in the low-status club, and the many vicissitudes of life in high school and as a teenager.

The series' sixth and final season premiered on January 9, 2015, and ended on March 20 of the same year. During the course of the series, 121 episodes of Glee aired.

== Series overview ==
Season	Episodes	Originally released		Average total viewers including DVR (millions)	Rank
Season	Episodes	First released	Last released	Average total viewers including DVR (millions)	Rank
1	22	May 19, 2009	June 8, 2010	9.77	33
2	22	September 21, 2010	May 24, 2011	10.11	43
3	22	September 20, 2011	May 22, 2012	8.71	56
4	22	September 13, 2012	May 9, 2013	8.26	50
5	20	September 26, 2013	May 13, 2014	4.57	105
6	13	January 9, 2015	March 20, 2015	3.14	148

== Episodes ==
=== Season 1 (2009–10) ===
No. overall	No. in season	Title	Directed by	Written by	Original release date	Prod. code	US viewers (millions)
1	1	"Pilot"	Ryan Murphy	Ryan Murphy & Brad Falchuk & Ian Brennan	May 19, 2009 (Note: An extended director's cut of the pilot was broadcast on September 2, 2009 as a lead-in to the series premiere. On its broadcast, the extended episode attracted 4.2 million viewers.)	1ARC79	9.62
2	2	"Showmance"	Ryan Murphy	Ryan Murphy & Brad Falchuk & Ian Brennan	September 9, 2009	1ARC01	7.50
3	3	"Acafellas"	John Scott	Ryan Murphy	September 16, 2009	1ARC02	6.69
4	4	"Preggers"	Brad Falchuk	Brad Falchuk	September 23, 2009	1ARC03	6.63
5	5	"The Rhodes Not Taken"	John Scott	Ian Brennan	September 30, 2009	1ARC04	7.40
6	6	"Vitamin D"	Elodie Keene	Ryan Murphy	October 7, 2009	1ARC05	7.28
7	7	"Throwdown"	Ryan Murphy	Brad Falchuk	October 14, 2009	1ARC06	7.65
8	8	"Mash-Up"	Elodie Keene	Ian Brennan	October 21, 2009	1ARC07	7.15
9	9	"Wheels"	Paris Barclay	Ryan Murphy	November 11, 2009	1ARC08	7.35
10	10	"Ballad"	Brad Falchuk	Brad Falchuk	November 18, 2009	1ARC09	7.36
11	11	"Hairography"	Bill D'Elia	Ian Brennan	November 25, 2009	1ARC10	6.08
12	12	"Mattress"	Elodie Keene	Ryan Murphy	December 2, 2009	1ARC11	8.15
13	13	"Sectionals"	Brad Falchuk	Brad Falchuk	December 9, 2009	1ARC12	8.13
14	14	"Hell-O"	Brad Falchuk	Ian Brennan	April 13, 2010	1ARC13	13.66
15	15	"The Power of Madonna"	Ryan Murphy	Ryan Murphy	April 20, 2010	1ARC14	12.98
16	16	"Home"	Paris Barclay	Brad Falchuk	April 27, 2010	1ARC15	12.18
17	17	"Bad Reputation"	Elodie Keene	Ian Brennan	May 4, 2010	1ARC16	11.62
18	18	"Laryngitis"	Alfonso Gomez-Rejon	Ryan Murphy	May 11, 2010	1ARC17	11.57
19	19	"Dream On"	Joss Whedon	Brad Falchuk	May 18, 2010	1ARC18	11.47
20	20	"Theatricality"	Ryan Murphy	Ryan Murphy	May 25, 2010	1ARC20	11.37
21	21	"Funk"	Elodie Keene	Ian Brennan	June 1, 2010	1ARC19	9.02
22	22	"Journey to Regionals"	Brad Falchuk	Brad Falchuk	June 8, 2010	1ARC21	10.92

=== Season 2 (2010–11) ===
"The Sue Sylvester Shuffle" (episode 11), broadcast immediately after Super Bowl XLV on February 6, 2011, was watched by 26.8 million viewers in the U.S., as the highest-rated scripted TV broadcast in 3 years.

No. overall	No. in season	Title	Directed by	Written by	Original release date	Prod. code	US viewers (millions)
23	1	"Audition"	Brad Falchuk	Ian Brennan	September 21, 2010	2ARC01	12.45
24	2	"Britney/Brittany"	Ryan Murphy	Ryan Murphy	September 28, 2010	2ARC02	13.51
25	3	"Grilled Cheesus"	Alfonso Gomez-Rejon	Brad Falchuk	October 5, 2010	2ARC03	11.20
26	4	"Duets"	Eric Stoltz	Ian Brennan	October 12, 2010	2ARC04	11.36
27	5	"The Rocky Horror Glee Show"	Adam Shankman	Story by : Ryan Murphy & Tim Wollaston; Teleplay by : Ryan Murphy	October 26, 2010	2ARC05	11.76
28	6	"Never Been Kissed"	Bradley Buecker	Brad Falchuk	November 9, 2010	2ARC06	10.99
29	7	"The Substitute"	Ryan Murphy	Ian Brennan	November 16, 2010	2ARC07	11.70
30	8	"Furt"	Carol Banker	Ryan Murphy	November 23, 2010	2ARC08	10.41
31	9	"Special Education"	Paris Barclay	Brad Falchuk	November 30, 2010	2ARC09	11.68
32	10	"A Very Glee Christmas"	Alfonso Gomez-Rejon	Ian Brennan	December 7, 2010	2ARC10	11.07
33	11	"The Sue Sylvester Shuffle"	Brad Falchuk	Ian Brennan	February 6, 2011	2ARC11	28.32
34	12	"Silly Love Songs"	Tate Donovan	Ryan Murphy	February 8, 2011	2ARC12	11.58
35	13	"Comeback"	Bradley Buecker	Ryan Murphy	February 15, 2011	2ARC13	10.53
36	14	"Blame It on the Alcohol"	Eric Stoltz	Ian Brennan	February 22, 2011	2ARC14	10.58
37	15	"Sexy"	Ryan Murphy	Brad Falchuk	March 8, 2011	2ARC15	11.92
38	16	"Original Song"	Bradley Buecker	Ryan Murphy	March 15, 2011	2ARC16	11.15
39	17	"A Night of Neglect"	Carol Banker	Ian Brennan	April 19, 2011	2ARC17	9.80
40	18	"Born This Way"	Alfonso Gomez-Rejon	Brad Falchuk	April 26, 2011	2ARC18	8.62
41	19	"Rumours"	Tim Hunter	Ryan Murphy	May 3, 2011	2ARC19	8.85
42	20	"Prom Queen"	Eric Stoltz	Ian Brennan	May 10, 2011	2ARC20	9.29
43	21	"Funeral"	Bradley Buecker	Ryan Murphy	May 17, 2011	2ARC21	8.97
44	22	"New York"	Brad Falchuk	Brad Falchuk	May 24, 2011	2ARC22	11.80

=== Season 3 (2011–12) ===
No. overall	No. in season	Title	Directed by	Written by	Original release date	Prod. code	US viewers (millions)
45	1	"The Purple Piano Project"	Eric Stoltz	Brad Falchuk	September 20, 2011	3ARC01	9.21
46	2	"I Am Unicorn"	Brad Falchuk	Ryan Murphy	September 27, 2011	3ARC02	8.60
47	3	"Asian F"	Alfonso Gomez-Rejon	Ian Brennan	October 4, 2011	3ARC03	8.42
48	4	"Pot o' Gold"	Adam Shankman	Ali Adler	November 1, 2011	3ARC04	7.47
49	5	"The First Time"	Bradley Buecker	Roberto Aguirre-Sacasa	November 8, 2011	3ARC05	6.91
50	6	"Mash Off"	Eric Stoltz	Michael Hitchcock	November 15, 2011	3ARC06	7.08
51	7	"I Kissed a Girl"	Tate Donovan	Matthew Hodgson	November 29, 2011	3ARC07	7.90
52	8	"Hold On to Sixteen"	Bradley Buecker	Ross Maxwell	December 6, 2011	3ARC08	7.11
53	9	"Extraordinary Merry Christmas"	Matthew Morrison	Marti Noxon	December 13, 2011	3ARC09	7.13
54	10	"Yes/No"	Eric Stoltz	Brad Falchuk	January 17, 2012	3ARC10	7.50
55	11	"Michael"	Alfonso Gomez-Rejon	Ryan Murphy	January 31, 2012	3ARC11	9.07
56	12	"The Spanish Teacher"	Paris Barclay	Ian Brennan	February 7, 2012	3ARC12	7.81
57	13	"Heart"	Brad Falchuk	Ali Adler	February 14, 2012	3ARC13	6.99
58	14	"On My Way"	Bradley Buecker	Roberto Aguirre-Sacasa	February 21, 2012	3ARC14	7.46
59	15	"Big Brother"	Eric Stoltz	Michael Hitchcock	April 10, 2012	3ARC15	6.76
60	16	"Saturday Night Glee-ver"	Bradley Buecker	Matthew Hodgson	April 17, 2012	3ARC16	6.23
61	17	"Dance with Somebody"	Paris Barclay	Ross Maxwell	April 24, 2012	3ARC17	6.90
62	18	"Choke"	Michael Uppendahl	Marti Noxon	May 1, 2012	3ARC18	6.01
63	19	"Prom-asaurus"	Eric Stoltz	Ryan Murphy	May 8, 2012	3ARC19	6.67
64	20	"Props"	Ian Brennan	Ian Brennan	May 15, 2012	3ARC20	6.09
65	21	"Nationals"	Eric Stoltz	Ali Adler	May 15, 2012	3ARC21	6.03
66	22	"Goodbye"	Brad Falchuk	Brad Falchuk	May 22, 2012	3ARC22	7.46

=== Season 4 (2012–13) ===
No. overall	No. in season	Title	Directed by	Written by	Original release date	Prod. code	US viewers (millions)
67	1	"The New Rachel"	Brad Falchuk	Ryan Murphy	September 13, 2012	4ARC01	7.41
68	2	"Britney 2.0"	Alfonso Gomez-Rejon	Brad Falchuk	September 20, 2012	4ARC02	7.46
69	3	"Makeover"	Eric Stoltz	Ian Brennan	September 27, 2012	4ARC03	5.79
70	4	"The Break Up"	Alfonso Gomez-Rejon	Ryan Murphy	October 4, 2012	4ARC04	6.07
71	5	"The Role You Were Born to Play"	Brad Falchuk	Michael Hitchcock	November 8, 2012	4ARC05	5.68
72	6	"Glease"	Michael Uppendahl	Roberto Aguirre-Sacasa	November 15, 2012	4ARC06	5.22
73	7	"Dynamic Duets"	Ian Brennan	Ian Brennan	November 22, 2012	4ARC07	4.62
74	8	"Thanksgiving"	Bradley Buecker	Russel Friend & Garrett Lerner	November 29, 2012	4ARC08	5.39
75	9	"Swan Song"	Brad Falchuk	Stacy Traub	December 6, 2012	4ARC09	5.43
76	10	"Glee, Actually"	Adam Shankman	Matthew Hodgson	December 13, 2012	4ARC10	5.26
77	11	"Sadie Hawkins"	Bradley Buecker	Ross Maxwell	January 24, 2013	4ARC11	6.79
78	12	"Naked"	Ian Brennan	Ryan Murphy	January 31, 2013	4ARC12	5.48
79	13	"Diva"	Paris Barclay	Brad Falchuk	February 7, 2013	4ARC13	6.03
80	14	"I Do"	Brad Falchuk	Ian Brennan	February 14, 2013	4ARC14	5.13
81	15	"Girls (and Boys) On Film"	Ian Brennan	Michael Hitchcock	March 7, 2013	4ARC15	6.72
82	16	"Feud"	Bradley Buecker	Roberto Aguirre-Sacasa	March 14, 2013	4ARC16	5.37
83	17	"Guilty Pleasures"	Eric Stoltz	Russel Friend & Garrett Lerner	March 21, 2013	4ARC17	5.91
84	18	"Shooting Star"	Bradley Buecker	Matthew Hodgson	April 11, 2013	4ARC18	6.67
85	19	"Sweet Dreams"	Elodie Keene	Ross Maxwell	April 18, 2013	4ARC19	6.14
86	20	"Lights Out"	Paris Barclay	Ryan Murphy	April 25, 2013	4ARC20	5.24
87	21	"Wonder-ful"	Wendey Stanzler	Brad Falchuk	May 2, 2013	4ARC21	5.19
88	22	"All or Nothing"	Bradley Buecker	Ian Brennan	May 9, 2013	4ARC22	5.92

=== Season 5 (2013–14) ===
No. overall	No. in season	Title	Directed by	Written by	Original release date	Prod. code	US viewers (millions)
89	1	"Love, Love, Love"	Bradley Buecker	Brad Falchuk	September 26, 2013	5ARC01	5.06
90	2	"Tina in the Sky with Diamonds"	Ian Brennan	Ian Brennan	October 3, 2013	5ARC02	4.42
91	3	"The Quarterback"	Brad Falchuk	Ryan Murphy & Brad Falchuk & Ian Brennan	October 10, 2013	5ARC03	7.39
92	4	"A Katy or a Gaga"	Ian Brennan	Russel Friend & Garrett Lerner	November 7, 2013	5ARC04	4.01
93	5	"The End of Twerk"	Wendey Stanzler	Michael Hitchcock	November 14, 2013	5ARC05	4.22
94	6	"Movin' Out"	Brad Falchuk	Roberto Aguirre-Sacasa	November 21, 2013	5ARC06	4.09
95	7	"Puppet Master"	Paul McCrane	Matthew Hodgson	November 28, 2013	5ARC07	2.84
96	8	"Previously Unaired Christmas"	Wendey Stanzler	Ross Maxwell	December 5, 2013	5ARC08	3.29
97	9	"Frenemies"	Bradley Buecker	Ned Martel	February 25, 2014	5ARC09	2.99
98	10	"Trio"	Ian Brennan	Sophia Rivka Rossi	March 4, 2014	5ARC10	2.68
99	11	"City of Angels"	Elodie Keene	Jessica Meyer	March 11, 2014	5ARC11	2.30
100	12	"100"	Paris Barclay	Ryan Murphy & Brad Falchuk & Ian Brennan	March 18, 2014	5ARC12	2.80
101	13	"New Directions"	Brad Falchuk	Brad Falchuk	March 25, 2014	5ARC13	2.68
102	14	"New New York"	Sanaa Hamri	Ryan Murphy	April 1, 2014	5ARC14	2.59
103	15	"Bash"	Bradley Buecker	Ian Brennan	April 8, 2014	5ARC15	2.78
104	16	"Tested"	Paul McCrane	Russel Friend & Garrett Lerner	April 15, 2014	5ARC16	2.44
105	17	"Opening Night"	Eric Stoltz	Michael Hitchcock	April 22, 2014	5ARC17	2.45
106	18	"The Back-Up Plan"	Ian Brennan	Roberto Aguirre-Sacasa	April 29, 2014	5ARC18	2.41
107	19	"Old Dog, New Tricks"	Bradley Buecker	Chris Colfer	May 6, 2014	5ARC19	2.10
108	20	"The Untitled Rachel Berry Project"	Brad Falchuk	Matthew Hodgson	May 13, 2014	5ARC20	1.87

=== Season 6 (2015) ===
No. overall	No. in season	Title	Directed by	Written by	Original release date	Prod. code	US viewers (millions)
109	1	"Loser Like Me"	Bradley Buecker	Ryan Murphy & Brad Falchuk & Ian Brennan	January 9, 2015	6ARC01	2.34
110	2	"Homecoming"	Bradley Buecker	Ryan Murphy	January 9, 2015	6ARC02	2.34
111	3	"Jagged Little Tapestry"	Paul McCrane	Brad Falchuk	January 16, 2015	6ARC03	1.98
112	4	"The Hurt Locker, Part One"	Ian Brennan	Ian Brennan	January 23, 2015	6ARC04	1.82
113	5	"The Hurt Locker, Part Two"	Barbara Brown	Ian Brennan	January 30, 2015	6ARC05	1.85
114	6	"What the World Needs Now"	Barbara Brown	Michael Hitchcock	February 6, 2015	6ARC06	1.58
115	7	"Transitioning"	Dante Di Loreto	Matthew Hodgson	February 13, 2015	6ARC07	1.81
116	8	"A Wedding"	Bradley Buecker	Ross Maxwell	February 20, 2015	6ARC08	1.86
117	9	"Child Star"	Michael Hitchcock	Ned Martel	February 27, 2015	6ARC10	1.69
118	10	"The Rise and Fall of Sue Sylvester"	Anthony Hemingway	Jessica Meyer	March 6, 2015	6ARC11	1.81
119	11	"We Built This Glee Club"	Joaquin Sedillo	Aristotle Kousakis	March 13, 2015	6ARC12	2.02
120	12	"2009"	Paris Barclay	Ryan Murphy & Brad Falchuk & Ian Brennan	March 20, 2015	6ARC09	2.69
121	13	"Dreams Come True"	Bradley Buecker	Ryan Murphy & Brad Falchuk & Ian Brennan	March 20, 2015	6ARC13	2.54

== Ratings ==
=== Seasons 1–3 ===
Glee : U.S. viewers per episode (millions)

Season	Episode number																					
Season	1	2	3	4	5	6	7	8	9	10	11	12	13	14	15	16	17	18	19	20	21	22
1	9.62	7.50	6.69	6.63	7.40	7.28	7.65	7.15	7.53	7.36	8.17	8.15	8.13	13.66	12.98	12.18	11.62	11.57	11.47	11.37	9.02	11.07
2	12.45	13.51	11.20	11.36	11.76	10.99	11.70	10.41	11.68	11.07	28.32	11.58	10.53	11.58	11.92	11.15	9.80	8.62	8.85	9.29	8.87	11.80
3	9.21	8.60	8.42	7.47	6.91	7.08	7.90	7.11	7.13	7.50	9.07	7.81	6.99	7.46	6.76	6.23	6.90	6.01	6.67	6.09	6.03	7.46

Audience measurement performed by Nielsen Media Research

=== Seasons 4–6 ===
Glee : U.S. viewers per episode (millions)

Season	Episode number																					
Season	1	2	3	4	5	6	7	8	9	10	11	12	13	14	15	16	17	18	19	20	21	22
4	7.41	7.46	5.79	6.07	5.68	5.22	4.62	5.39	5.43	5.26	6.79	5.48	6.03	5.13	6.72	5.37	5.91	6.67	6.14	5.24	5.19	5.91
5	5.06	4.42	7.39	4.02	4.22	4.09	2.84	3.29	2.99	2.68	2.30	2.80	2.68	2.59	2.78	2.44	2.45	2.41	2.10	1.87	–	
6	2.34	2.34	1.98	1.82	1.85	1.58	1.81	1.86	1.69	1.81	2.02	2.69	2.54	–								

Audience measurement performed by Nielsen Media Research

== See also ==
- Glee albums discography
- Glee songs discography
- List of songs in Glee
