= Red Hood: The Lost Days =

2010 comic series by Judd Winick and Pablo Raimundi

- Cover of Red Hood: The Lost Days #1, art by Billy Tucci.

Publication information
- Publisher: DC Comics
- Schedule: Monthly
- Format: Limited series
- Genre: Superhero
- Publication date: June – November 2010
- No. of issues: 6
- Main characters: Jason Todd; Ra's al Ghul; Talia al Ghul

Creative team
- Written by: Judd Winick
- Pencillers: Pablo Raimundi (#1–2); Cliff Richards (#2); Jeremy Haun (#3–6)
- Inkers: Pablo Raimundi (#1–3); Cliff Richards (#2); Brian Reber (#4–6)
- Letterer: Pat Brosseau
- Colorist: Brian Reber
- Editor(s): Mike Marts; Janelle Asselin

Collected editions
- Trade Paperback: ISBN 978-1401231644

Red Hood: The Lost Days is a six-issue comic book limited series published by the publishing company DC Comics in 2010 which depicts the resurrection of the character Jason Todd, later known as Red Hood. The series was written by Judd Winick and illustrated by Pablo Raimundi, Cliff Richards, and Jeremy Haun.

== Publication history ==
Winick had previously brought back the character Jason Todd from the dead in the series Batman: Under the Hood. The new limited series was meant to explain the missing years from Todd's life that had been left.

== Plot ==
Jason Todd is reawakened from death; as he is taken care of by Talia al Ghul, he plans to take revenge on those who hurt him in life.

Talia finds Jason on the streets of Gotham after Jason’s resurrection. She cares for Jason while he is catatonic, and eventually throws him into a Lazarus Pit. Jason's mind is healed, but he is deeply hurt by the circumstances of his death. Batman had replaced him as Robin and failed to kill the Joker after the Joker killed Jason. Jason tries to kill Batman at first, but can't find it within himself to go through with it. Instead, he spends the next few years training under the various teachers Talia sends him to, usually killing them afterwards. Jason intends to return to Gotham and have Batman kill the Joker as recompense for Jason's death.

== Reception ==
The series holds an average rating of 7.8 by 13 professional critics on review aggregation website Comic Book Roundup.

== Prints ==
=== Issues ===
No.	Title	Cover date	Comic Book Roundup rating	Estimated sales (first month)
#1	The Lost Days, Part One: The First Step	August 2010	7.3 by six professional critics.	34,197, ranked 57th in North American
#2	Baptism	September 2010	6.9 by four professional critics.	26,560, ranked 92d in North American
#3	Part Three, School	October 2010	—N/a	24,701, ranked 81st in North American
#4	Part Four, Higher Learning	November 2010	7.2 by two professional critics.	24,104, ranked 83rd in North American
#5	Part Five, After School Activities	December 2010	—N/a	22,967, ranked 85th in North American
#6	Conclusion, Benediction and Commencement	January 2011	9.0 by one professional critic.	22,123, ranked 81st in North American

=== Collected editions ===
Title	Format	Material collected	Pages	Publication date	ISBN	Estimated sales
Red Hood – The Lost Days	Trade paperback (TPB)	Red Hood: The Lost Days (2010) #1-6	144	July 5, 2011	1401231640; ISBN 978-1401231644	2,520

== See also ==
- List of DC Comics publications
- List of Batman comics
