= Jeremy Haun =

American comic book writer

- Haun at the 2026 Rose City Comic Con
- Born: October 9, 1975 (age 51)
- Areas: Writer, Artist
- Notable works: The Beauty; The Realm; Red Mother; Detective Comics; Gotham City Sirens

Jeremy Haun (born October 9, 1975) is an American comic book writer and artist. Beginning his career in 2002, Haun has worked for publishers including Image Comics, BOOM! Studios, DC Comics, Marvel Comics, IDW Publishing, Oni Press, and Top Cow. He is best known for creator-owned horror series such as The Beauty (with Jason A. Hurley), The Realm, and Red Mother.

Haun serves as Creative Director of Ignition Press and hosts the video podcast Curious Haunts. He resides in Joplin, Missouri.

== Career ==
=== Early career ===
Haun entered the comics industry in 2002, producing work for Image Comics, IDW Publishing, Oni Press, Devil's Due Publishing, and Top Cow. His early credits include the Image/Top Cow miniseries Berserker and Battle Hymn.

Marvel Comics hired Haun for the 2006 New Excalibur series during the Civil War event. He transitioned to DC Comics in 2008, contributing art to Detective Comics and other Batman-family titles.

Haun is largely self-taught, though art instructors from grade school through college influenced his development; he has described formal training as "all pretty bad" but credits on-the-job practice for honing skills like anatomy and fashion rendering on projects such as Batwoman. He cites Bernie Wrightson, Tim Sale, and 1970s–80s horror films as key visual influences.

=== Work for major publishers ===
Haun illustrated arcs on DC titles including Gotham City Sirens, Batwoman, Constantine: Hellblazer, and Batman: Arkham Reborn. At Marvel, he drew portions of Captain America and Red Hood: The Lost Days. Other credits include Wolf Moon (DC/Vertigo), Masters of Horror (IDW), and King Spawn (Image).

=== Creator-owned work ===
Haun's creator-owned projects emphasize horror and thriller genres. With Jason A. Hurley, he developed The Beauty from Top Cow's 2011 Pilot Season anthology, which won that year's "Crown" contest; Image Comics published the ongoing series from 2015 to 2019 (29 issues), a 2021 one-shot, and six trade paperbacks, with Ignition Press relaunching it in 2025. According to Comichron, The Beauty #1 sold an estimated 25,245 copies in its first month—Image's fourth-best launch that August—and went through three printings. Critics praised its body-horror premise satirizing beauty standards.

Haun wrote and drew The Realm (Image, 2018–2020) and Haunthology, a Kickstarter-funded short story collection released by Image in 2023. For BOOM! Studios, he created Red Mother (2019–2021, three volumes) and The Approach (2023–). Other titles include 40 Seconds (ComiXology/Dark Horse) and Murder Podcast (Ignition Press, 2025).

=== Ignition Press and other media ===
As Creative Director of Ignition Press (an Image imprint launched 2025), Haun oversees titles including the Murder Podcast relaunch and signing tours. He hosts the podcast Curious Haunts.

=== Adaptations ===
Haun executive produces FX's The Beauty (2026), created by Ryan Murphy with stars Evan Peters, Anthony Ramos, Ashton Kutcher, and others; the series premiered footage at New York Comic Con 2025. Netflix is developing The Leading Man (with B. Clay Moore) as a film starring John Cena and Kevin Hart.

== Bibliography ==
=== Image Comics ===
- The Beauty (with Jason A. Hurley, 2015–2019, 2025–; six trade paperbacks)
- The Realm (2018–2020)
- Haunthology (2023)
- King Spawn (artist, 2021–)
- Berserker (early 2000s)
- Battle Hymn (early 2000s)

=== DC Comics ===
- Detective Comics #850–866 (artist, 2008–2009)
- Gotham City Sirens #1–26 (artist, 2009–2011)
- Batwoman (artist, selected issues)
- Constantine: Hellblazer (artist)
- Batman: Arkham Reborn (artist, 2009)
- Red Hood: The Lost Days (artist, 2010)
- Wolf Moon (Vertigo)

=== BOOM! Studios ===
- Red Mother (2019–2021; three volumes)
- The Approach (2023–)

=== Marvel Comics ===
- New Excalibur #16–20 (artist, 2006)
- Captain America (artist, selected issues)

=== Other publishers ===
- Masters of Horror (IDW Publishing)
- 40 Seconds (ComiXology/Dark Horse)
- Murder Podcast (with Mike Tisserand, Ignition Press, 2025–)

=== Television ===
- The Beauty (FX, 2026; executive producer)
