= The Beauty (comics) =

American comic book series

Publication information
- Publisher: Top Cow (pilot); Image Comics (2015–2022); Ignition Press (2025–)
- Schedule: Monthly
- Format: Ongoing
- Genre: Horror; Science fiction; Crime

Creative team
- Created by: Jeremy Haun; Jason A. Hurley
- Written by: Jeremy Haun; Jason A. Hurley
- Artist: Jeremy Haun

The Beauty is an American creator-owned comic book series written by Jeremy Haun and Jason A. Hurley, with art by Haun. The series debuted as a pilot story in Top Cow’s 2011 Pilot Season anthology before launching as an ongoing series at Image Comics in August 2015. It blends horror, crime, and science fiction, centering on a sexually transmitted disease that grants physical perfection but results in death after approximately 800 days, investigated by detectives Drew Foster and Kara Vaughn.

The Image Comics run published issues #1 through #29 between August 12, 2015, and September 11, 2019; two later issues were solicited but canceled. A one-shot conclusion, The Beauty: All Good Things, was released on September 1, 2021. The series was collected into six trade paperbacks, with the final volume released in 2022.

In 2025, Ignition Press relaunched the series with new issues, with Haun serving as creative director of the imprint.

== Publication history ==
The Beauty originated in Top Cow Productions’ 2011 Pilot Season anthology, where it was selected for further development.

The ongoing series launched at Image Comics with The Beauty #1 on August 12, 2015, and ran through issue #29, released September 11, 2019. Issues #30 and #31 were later solicited but ultimately canceled. A one-shot conclusion, The Beauty: All Good Things, was released on September 1, 2021. The Image Comics run was collected across six trade paperbacks, with Volume 6 published in 2022.

Ignition Press announced a relaunch of the series in 2025, coinciding with the development of a television adaptation.

== Collected editions ==
Vol.	Title	Material	Publication date	ISBN
1	The Beauty Vol. 1	#1–6	December 7, 2016	978-1-63215-842-0
2	The Beauty Vol. 2	#7-11	August 23, 2017	978-1-5343-0172-6
3	The Beauty Vol. 3	#12-18	June 13, 2018	978-1-5343-0603-5
4	The Beauty Vol. 4	#19–22	August 1, 2018	978-1-5343-1076-6
5	The Beauty Vol. 5	#23–26	February 20, 2019	978-1-5343-1043-8
6	The Beauty Vol. 6	#27–30	January 5, 2022	978-1-5343-1496-2

== Reception ==
The series received critical attention for its use of body horror and social commentary. In a 2016 review, Vox described The Beauty as a “terrifying comic book,” praising its framing of beauty as a contagious threat rather than an aspiration.

== Adaptation ==
In September 2024, FX ordered a television adaptation of The Beauty, created by Ryan Murphy. The series premiered in January 2026 and stars Evan Peters, Anthony Ramos, Jeremy Pope, Ashton Kutcher, and Rebecca Hall. Jeremy Haun serves as an executive producer on the adaptation.
