= Batman: Under the Hood =

DC Comics story arc

"Under the Hood"
- Cover of Batman #638 (March 2005), art by Matt Wagner and Todd Klein.
- Publisher: DC Comics
- Publication date: February 2005 – April 2006
- Genre: Superhero
- Title(s): Batman #635–641, 645–650, Annual #25
- Main character(s): Batman; Red Hood; Nightwing; Black Mask; Joker

Creative team
- Writer: Judd Winick
- Artist(s): Doug Mahnke; Eric Battle; Shane Davis

"Batman: Under the Hood" (also known as "Batman: Under the Red Hood") is a comic book story arc published by the comic book publishing company DC Comics, written by Judd Winick and primarily illustrated by Doug Mahnke. Featuring Batman in the monthly title of the same name, it ran from February to August 2005, before going on a short hiatus and returning from November 2005 to April 2006. The story arc is also a part of the crossover Infinite Crisis.

The story was notable for bringing long-dead Batman ally Jason Todd, the second Robin, back to life, and reimagining him as a brutally violent and vengeful antihero known as the Red Hood. Writer Jeph Loeb suggested in his Batman story "Hush" that Jason may, in fact, be alive, and Winick attached his return story to Jason's appearance in "Hush", before building an entire story around it. In the summer of 2010, Winick penned the six-issue arc, Red Hood: The Lost Days, further detailing Jason's return and his training across the globe before his eventual collaboration with his former mentor's foe, Hush. The same year, the arc was adapted as a DC Universe Animated Original Movie entitled Batman: Under the Red Hood, earning widespread acclaim from critics and audiences.

== Background ==
In 1988, writer Jim Starlin wrote the Batman story "A Death in the Family", that featured Jason Todd's death at the hands of the Joker. The story of Jason Todd remained virtually untouched for the better part of 15 years, until the character appeared to have been active in the "Batman: Hush" storyline. Although it was later revealed that Clayface had posed as Jason, the end of "Hush" raised questions about the whereabouts of Jason's body, as it was not in its grave.

== Plot summary ==
A flashback to Batman's early years (post Dick Grayson's retirement as Robin) shows a young Jason Todd attempting to steal the wheels of the Batmobile. He becomes the new Robin. Years later, after being resurrected from his murder by the Joker due to an overlap of Hypertime-lines, Jason is institutionalized, escapes, and begins living on the streets. Ra's al Ghul and his daughter Talia kidnap Jason and hold him in care for a year. Ra's takes the trip to his Lazarus Pit. Talia pushes Jason into the pit, empowering and unleashing a new, stronger, more violent creature. Talia smuggles him out of the estate, giving him a bag containing money, a computer and memories of Batman, the Joker, and Red Hood. Jason attempts to reconnect with Batman but his former mentor fights and defeats him. Jason reveals the empire he has built for himself as he dons an initial costume identity of the Joker: the "Red Hood".

Shortly after, the gangster Black Mask controls most of Gotham City's criminal underworld but is being countered by the Red Hood, who then destroys the top floor of Black Mask's fortress with a long-range explosive. Black Mask teams up with the Secret Society of Super Villains (Deathstroke, Captain Nazi, Hyena, and Count Vertigo) to combat Red Hood. Batman and Red Hood defeat Black Mask's villains but end on bad terms due to Red Hood's deadly tactics.

Alfred receives a package with a lock of green hair and a note from Jason asking for Batman to meet him. Black Mask calls a meeting of his top associates and murders them under the eye of Red Hood. Black Mask and Red Hood fight and Batman arrives just as Red Hood is stabbed in the heart. Removing Red Hood's helmet, Black Mask sees that it is not Jason Todd. Batman traps Black Mask and goes to meet Jason.

Jason has kidnapped and savagely beats the Joker, who laughs maniacally until falling silent when Jason says he sees through his crazy act. Batman enters and their brief fight is interrupted when a bomb is dropped on Blüdhaven by the Society, where Dick Grayson now fights crime as Nightwing. Jason tosses a gun to Batman and points his own gun at the Joker's head, saying that Batman must either kill Jason, or let Jason kill the Joker on a count of three. At the last half-second, Batman throws a batarang at Jason. The Joker triggers explosives throughout the building. Batman and the Joker survive the blast, and Jason escapes.

== In other media ==
- The storyline was adapted (with some changes for pacing and storytelling purposes) into a 2010 animated film called Batman: Under the Red Hood, featuring Bruce Greenwood as the voice of Batman and Jensen Ackles as the voice of the Red Hood.
  - The film had a 2020 follow-up titled Batman: Death in the Family, which was an interactive film in which viewers could determine Jason's fate. If viewers select "Robin Dies", Bruce provides a recap of Under the Red Hood to Clark Kent. While Jason survives in the other alternative paths, he still ends up becoming a violent vigilante and his stories take elements from Under the Hood and Batman: Hush.
- The storyline was adapted in the 2015 video game Batman: Arkham Knight. Unlike the original comic, Jason was tortured by Joker for over a year in Arkham Asylum, with Joker faking his death and sending the footage to Batman after turning the Dark Knight's former sidekick against him. After eventually escaping, Jason took on the identity of the Arkham Knight and worked together with Scarecrow to take over Gotham and kill Batman. After Batman learns the Arkham Knight's true identity and defeats him, he apologizes and Jason escapes after refusing to accept his help. He later assists Batman in defeating the Scarecrow, having forgiven him. After the events of the game, Jason becomes the Red Hood.
- The storyline was loosely adapted in the 2019 animated film Lego DC Batman: Family Matters with a more comedic and lighthearted tone. Unlike the original comic and other media adaptations, Jason did not die and instead became the Red Hood when he believed Batman did not care about him.
- The storyline was adapted in the third season of Titans. In this version, Jason's death, resurrection, and murderous rampage as the Red Hood were a result of him being manipulated by Jonathan Crane.
