= The Beauty (TV series) =

2026 American body horror television series

- Genre: Body horror; Science fiction
- Created by: Ryan Murphy & Matthew Hodgson
- Based on: The Beauty by: Jeremy Haun; Jason A. Hurley
- Starring: Evan Peters; Anthony Ramos; Jeremy Pope; Rebecca Hall; Ashton Kutcher
- Music by: Mac Quayle
- Country of origin: United States
- Original language: English
- No. of seasons: 1
- No. of episodes: 11

Production
- Executive producers: Ryan Murphy; Matthew Hodgson; Eric Kovtun; Scott Robertson; Nissa Diederich; Michael Uppendahl; Evan Peters; Anthony Ramos; Jeremy Pope; Alexis Martin Woodall; Eric Gitter; Peter Schwerin; Jeremy Haun
- Producer: Kip Davis Myers
- Cinematography: Jason McCormick; Stanley Fernandez
- Editors: Peggy Tachdjian; Julia Franklin; Travis Weaver; Shannon Baker Davis; Philip Welch; Caroline Wang
- Running time: 24–52 minutes
- Production companies: Ryan Murphy Productions; 20th Television

Original release
- Network: FX; FX on Hulu
- Release: January 21 – March 4, 2026

The Beauty is an American science fiction body horror television series created by Ryan Murphy and Matthew Hodgson. It is based on the comic book The Beauty, written by Jeremy Haun and Jason A. Hurley, and stars Evan Peters, Anthony Ramos, Jeremy Pope, Rebecca Hall, and Ashton Kutcher. The series premiered on FX and Hulu on January 21, 2026. In July 2026, it was reported that the entire cast had been released so the actors can pursue other projects, leaving the future of the series unclear. In November 2026, it was reported that the series had been canceled.

== Premise ==
FBI agents Cooper Madsen and Jordan Bennett investigate a series of unexplained deaths among international supermodels. Their inquiry leads to the discovery of a sexually transmitted virus called "The Beauty," which grants physical attractiveness but carries fatal consequences. As they trace its origins, the agents uncover a connection to a powerful and secretive tech figure known as "The Corporation," who seeks to protect the drug and its global expansion. Pursued by a hired operative known as "The Assassin," the agents continue their investigation across multiple international cities amid the growing outbreak.

== Cast and characters ==
=== Main ===
- Evan Peters as Cooper Madsen, a former Navy SEAL and FBI agent investigating deaths linked to "the Beauty"
  - Hudson Barry as Cooper after the transformation
- Anthony Ramos as Antonio / the Assassin, an enforcer working for "the Corporation" who took the drug soon after it was invented. He is 65 years old in a 30-something year old's body.
  - Teddy Cañez as the Assassin before the transformation
- Jeremy Pope as Jeremy, an outsider drawn into the chaos surrounding the epidemic
  - Jaquel Spivey as Jeremy before the transformation
- Rebecca Hall as Jordan Bennett, an FBI agent and Cooper's partner
  - Jessica Alexander as Jordan after the transformation
- Ashton Kutcher as Byron Forst / the Corporation, a tech billionaire tied to the "Beauty" drug who took it three years ago to keep himself from aging
  - Vincent D'Onofrio as Byron before the transformation

=== Recurring ===
- Isabella Rossellini as Franny Forst, Byron's estranged wife
  - Nicola Peltz Beckham as Franny after the transformation
- John Carroll Lynch as FBI Supervisor Meyer Williams
  - Patrick Luwis as Meyer after the transformation
- Rob Yang as Dr. Ray Lee, a scientist and the original developer of the "Beauty" drug who now works for Byron
- Ari Graynor as Dr. Diana Sterling, a roboticist and the creator of the "Deacons"

=== Guest ===
- Bella Hadid as Ruby Rossdale, a supermodel who combusted from the "Beauty"'s side effects after rampaging in Paris
- Jon Jon Briones as Dr. Dilegre, a plastic surgeon who works at ANUU
- Céline Menville as Vincent Seraphine
- Chanel Stewart as Claire, a mysterious woman who infected Jeremy
- Joey Pollari as Mike McGuinn, a scientist and Ray's colleague
  - Eddie Kaye Thomas as Mike before the transformation
- Ben Platt as Manny, a Condé Nast employee who is infected by Harper after her combustion
  - Isaac Powell as Manny after the transformation
- Meghan Trainor as Brittany, a Condé Nast employee
- Amelia Gray Hamlin as Harper Rose, an assistant editor for Vogue who infected numerous Condé Nast employees during her combustion
- Gus Halper as Ashley Sanders, a Condé Nast employee and survivor of Harper's rampage
- T. Ryder Smith as Dr. Terry
- Peter Gallagher as Axel Zufo, a fossil fuels billionaire
- Billy Eichner as Waylen Lemming, a crypto billionaire
- David Pittu as Ronan Wylde, a banking billionaire
- Julie Halston as Kitty Munson, a multinational retail billionaire
- Matthew Laureano as Nate, a victim who is tortured and killed by the Assassin and Jeremy
- Rev Yolanda as Clara Gardner, a transgender scientist and Mike's best friend
  - Lux Pascal as Clara after the transformation
- Laura Dreyfuss as Jennifer King
- Robert Harrington as Jefferson, Byron's bodyguard
- Kelli O'Hara as Juliana Williams, Meyer's wife
  - Hazel Graye as Juliana after the transformation
- Kaylee Halko as Joey, the teenage daughter of Meyer and Juliana who has progeria
  - Augusta Liv as Joey after the transformation
- Kevin Cahoon as Tiger "Tig" Forst, one of Byron and Franny's sons
  - Ray Nicholson as Tig after the transformation
- Eric Petersen as Gunther Forst, one of Byron and Franny's sons
  - Brandon Gillard as Gunther after the transformation
- Anthony Rapp as a Scientist who worked for the space colonization division of Byron's corporation
- Emma Halleen as Bella Grant, a school student who becomes fixated on the "Beauty"
- Annabelle Wachtel as Ruthie, Bella's best friend who is lamenting a failed nose job
  - Paige McGarvin as Ruthie after the transformation
- Maria Dizzia as Marcy Grant, Bella's mother
- Daniel Stewart Sherman as Bella's father
- Carson Rowland as Conor, an employee of Byron's corporation who administers doses of the "Beauty"
  - Ethan Eisenstein as Conor before the transformation
- Red Concepcion as Sir Ma'am, a social media influencer
  - Sky Kawai as Sir Ma'am after the transformation

== Episodes ==
No.	Title	Directed by	Written by	Original release date
1	"Beautiful Pilot"	Ryan Murphy	Ryan Murphy & Matthew Hodgson	January 21, 2026
Amidst a Balenciaga fashion show in Paris, supermodel Ruby Rossdale suddenly goes on a rampage throughout the city, during which she exhibits erratically violent behavior, superhuman strength and resilience, and a fixation towards water before spontaneously exploding. While investigating the case, FBI agents Cooper Madsen and Jordan Bennett discover Rossdale, among other models who died under similar circumstances, all began their careers two years prior, had no social media presence beforehand, and all tested positive for a highly virulent sexually transmitted virus. Meanwhile, a lonely and directionless young man named Jeremy seeks to become more attractive, leading him to follow an internet chatroom recommendation for a mysterious "solution". He heads to a plastic surgery center called ANUU, where a specialist named Dr. Dilegre gives him a new facial structure. After being tricked into paying three women's bar tab, an incensed Jeremy returns to ANUU and murders several employees until Dilegre agrees to give him an experimental treatment. Traveling to a hotel, Jeremy has intercourse with a mysterious woman named Claire, after which he undergoes a violent transformation and gains a new body.
2	"Beautiful Jordan"	Alexis Martin Woodall	Ryan Murphy & Matthew Hodgson	January 21, 2026
Cooper and Jordan head to Venice to investigate a death connected to the virus. There, they find the Egyptian hieroglyph "Nefer", meaning "beauty", painted in blood on a wall near the victim, who they theorized was killed as part of an organized operation. They later uncover a video posted by a previous victim in which she repeatedly says "Don't do it" before learning an assistant editor for Vogue combusted in New York. During their last night in Italy, the pair discuss their sexual relationship, with Jordan clarifying her desire for it to remain casual and Cooper expressing his nihilistic belief that all human behavior is driven by sex. This and his disinterest in traditional monogamy or commitment offend Jordan and so later that evening she has a sexual encounter with a mysterious man. Afterward, she undergoes a similar transformation as Jeremy, gaining a new body. Elsewhere, Cooper prepares to leave for New York. Though he is attacked by two unknown assailants, he eventually kills them. Meanwhile, in Rome, an assassin eliminates people on behalf of billionaire tech mogul Byron "The Corporation" Forst.
3	"Beautiful Christopher Cross"	Ryan Murphy	Ryan Murphy & Matthew Hodgson	January 21, 2026
In New York City, Harper Rose, an assistant editor for Vogue, goes on a rampage at Condé Nast before infecting numerous bystanders while combusting. In Venice, Cooper is detained by Italian police before FBI Supervisor Meyer Williams has him released and sent to New York after he tests negative for the virus. In Croatia, Byron tasks the Assassin with killing Dilegre for treating a contaminated client. Soon after, his estranged wife, Franny, informs him that their son Tig relapsed and is in a methadone clinic, but Byron refuses to visit him. Upon reaching him, the Assassin forces Dilegre to help him locate Jeremy before killing the former. The Assassin captures Jeremy and forces him to help him locate Marcy, a maid Jeremy had infected. While driving to her home, the Assassin tells Jeremy his belief that the world is cruel to those who are not beautiful before revealing he was hired by Byron to kill people for spreading the virus before his company's IPO. Upon their arrival, the pair subdue Marcy before the Assassin prepares to kill Jeremy. Seeing the latter's submissive behavior, the Assassin decides to recruit him as an apprentice instead.
4	"Beautiful Chimp Face"	Alexis Martin Woodall	Ryan Murphy & Matthew Hodgson	January 28, 2026
In a flashback, Cooper and Jordan go on a date in Rome, during which they hint at sharing romantic feelings for each other. In the present, Cooper probes two survivors of Harper's rampage: her boyfriend Ashley Sanders, who is believed to have had unprotected sex with her beforehand and is potentially infected; and Manny, who Ashley claims is a sexual predator. Manny takes an interest in Cooper before going on his own rampage. Cooper pursues him to a high-security room containing full human skins donated by "beautiful" people before their deaths, where Manny transforms and attacks Cooper, blaming him for what happened. Cooper gains backup and subdues Manny. Sometime later, Jordan reunites with Cooper. Concurrently, the Assassin coaches an eager Jeremy while Byron takes booster shots to maintain his body's stability and declares "World Beauty Day" will be the official public launch of his new drug, dismissing concerns from a scientist named Dr. Ray Lee about lack of testing and third-party mutated variants, and orders production to be doubled.
5	"Beautiful Billionaires"	Alexis Martin Woodall	Ryan Murphy & Matthew Hodgson	February 4, 2026
In a flashback, Byron joins a group of fellow billionaires in gathering for an exclusive trial of an experimental gene therapy developed by Ray. After transforming, Byron kills the other billionaires and witnesses before kidnapping Ray to ensure he becomes the sole proprietor of Ray's work. In the present, Cooper verifies Jordan's identity and embraces her. Upon learning what happened to her, he promises to help her avert the infection's side effects, insisting she eschews contact with the authorities to avoid being quarantined. Meanwhile, the Assassin and Jeremy torture a man named Nate for information, who contracted the virus from a sex worker and spread it to several people, before Byron orders the Assassin to eliminate Cooper. As Cooper and Jordan return to the former's apartment, they find Nate's corpse and the "Nefer" hieroglyph on the wall.
6	"Beautiful Patient Zero"	Michael Uppendahl	Ryan Murphy & Matthew Hodgson	February 11, 2026
In a flashback, shortly after kidnapping Ray, Byron notices side effects and agrees to let him live to perfect the formula while killing anyone who has the virus to prevent it from becoming a street drug. Byron later attempts to convince Franny to take the drug, outlining his plan to use himself and the extreme cosmetic appeal it grants to amass power and circumvent the FDA's laws, but she declines and threatens to expose him. Ray discovers the virus causes "ignition ketosis" after 855 days and promises to find a treatment that Byron can sell alongside it. Meanwhile, Ray's colleagues Mike and Clara bond over insecurities related to their appearances, their social confidence and Clara's male-to-female gender-affirming hormone therapy. After hearing of a chimpanzee transforming after being given the Beauty, Mike steals two vials and administers them to himself and Clara, giving her the female body she had desired. Two years later, the Assassin executes Mike in Rome to prevent the virus from spreading beyond Byron's control.
7	"Beautiful Living Rooms"	Michael Uppendahl	Ryan Murphy & Matthew Hodgson	February 18, 2026
Cooper takes Jordan to a safe house, where she confesses her love for him. Byron visits Meyer and his wife Juliana, offering to cure their daughter Joey of her progeria using the Beauty, plus doses for them and financial compensation, in exchange for shutting down the FBI investigation and handing over Cooper. They accept Byron's deal. Elsewhere, Jeremy pushes the Assassin to reveal his history and name, Antonio, and the two bond over similar family trauma. Meyer arranges for Cooper to access the NIH and collect a DNA sample before the Assassin and Jeremy ambush him and Jordan at the hospital. The Assassin forces Cooper to surrender by threatening Jordan, whom he reciprocates feelings for as they are both taken captive. Subsequently, Meyer, Juliana, and Joey all undergo the Beauty procedure and reunite as a newly transformed family, as Byron watches proudly.
8	"Beautiful Brothers"	Michael Uppendahl	Ryan Murphy & Matthew Hodgson	February 25, 2026
As Byron prepares his presentation for the Beauty's upcoming launch, he cuts down his company's budget and disbands its other divisions to reinvest in the drug, disaffecting roboticist Dr. Diana Sterling. He later uses the Beauty procedure on his estranged sons, Tig and Gunther, to save them from drug overdose; for which Franny swears vengeance on Byron. Elsewhere, the Assassin is betrayed by Byron before he, Jeremy, Cooper, and Jordan are taken to an NIH quarantine facility, where the survivors of the Condé Nast incident had previously been killed by mercenaries. Jeremy and the Assassin clash over the latter not informing the former about the Beauty's side effects, before Cooper stops them. He is then summoned by Meyer, now an NIH supervisor, and told to follow orders. Upon his return, Cooper and the others are extracted from the quarantine zone by Diana's "Deacon" robots.
9	"Beautiful Evolution"	Crystle Roberson Dorsey	Ryan Murphy & Matthew Hodgson	February 25, 2026
Believing her Deacons are superior to Byron's drug and wanting to regain the rights to her work back from him, Diana joins forces with Franny to formulate a plan to assassinate him. After masterminding Cooper, Jordan, the Assassin, and Jeremy's escape, she asks for their help. As Byron knows what they all look like, Cooper must take the Beauty and use his new appearance to get close to him. Cooper agrees as long as he contracts it through sex with Jordan rather than injection so that he can spend more time with her first, despite Diana's warning that the drug is more stable. Jordan, the Assassin, and Jeremy are alarmed as Cooper's transformation, unlike their own, turns out to be longer and more painful, and Cooper emerges in the form of an adolescent.
10	"Beautiful Beauty Day"	Michael Uppendahl	Ryan Murphy & Matthew Hodgson	March 4, 2026
Following Cooper's transformation, he, Jordan, the Assassin, and Jeremy devise a plan to assassinate Byron, but are too late as the Beauty is suddenly launched and released all over the world a day earlier than anticipated. A week later, high school student Bella Grant becomes fixated on the Beauty after her best friend Ruthie, who had a botched nose job, undergoes the Beauty procedure with successful results and is treated to a luxurious high-end experience her parents paid for. Since Bella cannot afford "the shot" officially and her parents do not approve of it, Ruthie gives her a card with a number to call for a cheaper backdoor method of obtaining the Beauty.
11	"Beautiful Betrayal"	Michael Uppendahl	Ryan Murphy & Matthew Hodgson	March 4, 2026
Tig and Gunther inject Franny with the Beauty against her will in an attempt to please Byron, leading her to attempt suicide, though Byron has doctors stabilize her with the Beauty's regenerative properties. Meanwhile, Bella pawns her parents' possessions for money and meets with a man named Conor, who had taken a second dose of the Beauty to increase the strength. Bella pays him to have sex with her, but the resulting transformation leaves her with grotesque mutations. Moved by his wife's suicide attempt and learning that the public and government no longer support the Beauty due to widely reported side-effects, Byron halts sales and closes down the operation to reinvest in cures and fixes, while providing boosters for free. Diana convinces Byron to allow her to "improve" the Beauty using AI. Wishing to continue distributing the drug and inherit Byron's business, Tig enlists Diana, Cooper, Jordan, the Assassin, and Jeremy's help to assassinate him. In exchange, Cooper is given an untested drug based on Ray's research and developed by Diana's AI systems to reverse the Beauty's effects. The others are stunned when he emerges from his transformation.

== Production ==
=== Development ===
On September 30, 2024, FX gave the project an 11-episode series order. The series is based on The Beauty, a creator-owned comic book written by Jeremy Haun and Jason A. Hurley and published by Image Comics. The original comic follows two detectives investigating a sexually transmitted disease that makes those infected physically beautiful but ultimately proves fatal due to side effects.

Mac Quayle, a frequent collaborator with Murphy, composed the score for the series.

=== Casting ===
Upon the series order announcement, Peters, Ramos, Pope, and Ashton Kutcher were cast in starring roles. Rebecca Hall was cast as part of the main cast by the time the series had begun production. In February 2025, it was reported that Isabella Rossellini had joined the cast in a recurring role.

In July 2026, it was reported that the entire cast had been released so the actors can pursue other projects.

In November 2026, TVLine reported that the series had been canceled.

=== Filming ===
Filming began in New York City on December 2, 2024. The production filmed in Pearl River, New York in late January 2025.

=== Themes ===
Murphy has described The Beauty as a commentary on "Ozempic culture" and the broader social fixation on rapid, drug-assisted physical transformation. In promotional interviews, Murphy framed the story around the question of how much people would be willing to sacrifice in pursuit of beauty, positioning the series as an extension of themes explored in his earlier work Nip/Tuck while emphasizing its science fiction and body-horror elements.

== Release ==
The trailer for The Beauty was released on January 5, 2026. Within seven days, it amassed nearly 190 million views across social media platforms, making it FX's most-viewed trailer to date. The Beauty premiered on January 21, on FX, Hulu, and Hulu on Disney+, with the first three episodes released immediately and the remaining episodes released weekly in the United States. Internationally, the series was made available to stream on Disney+.

== Reception ==
=== Critical response ===
On Rotten Tomatoes, the first season holds an approval rating of 68% based on 66 reviews. On Metacritic, the season has a weighted average score of 64 out of 100 based on 33 critics, which the site categorizes as "generally favorable" reviews.

Some reviewers drew unfavorable comparisons to Coralie Fargeat's 2024 film The Substance, which had explored similar themes of body horror and beauty culture the prior year. Writing for IndieWire, Ben Travers described the series as a "misshapen mess" and a "feeble spin" on The Substance. The review on RogerEbert.com argued the series had "so much style and very little substance" and did not go sufficiently deep into its central ideas. Tech Advisor similarly described the series as "messy and pretentious" and "not entertaining enough for a decent guilty pleasure." Writing for Bloody Disgusting, Daniel Kurland called it a "botched, ugly embarrassment," acknowledging the show's practical effects as "genuinely remarkable" but arguing that its satire grows "increasingly repetitive and meandering" and that its final act "transforms it into an almost completely different series."

=== Ratings ===
On FX, The Beauty premiered on January 21, 2026, drawing a total audience (P2+) of 512,400 viewers with a 0.16 rating, including 294,600 household viewers (0.23 rating). Subsequent episodes drew 297,900 viewers (0.09) on January 28, 183,000 (0.06) on February 4, and 206,000 (0.06) on February 11, followed by 266,000 viewers (0.08) on February 18 and 251,000 viewers (0.08) on February 25. The episode broadcast on March 4 drew 170,000 viewers (0.05), including 40,800 viewers aged 18–49 (0.03 rating), 37,700 viewers aged 25–54 (0.03 rating), and 166,500 household viewers (0.13 rating). Across this period, total viewership (P2+) ranged from 170,000 to 512,400 viewers, while ratings among adults aged 18–49 varied between 0.03 and 0.07.

On streaming, The Beauty ranked No. 1 on Hulu's "Top 15 Today" list—a daily ranking of the platform's most-watched titles—on January 23, 2026, and remained on the chart through March 6, 2026.

=== Accolades ===
Year	Award	Category	Nominee(s)	Result	Ref.
2026	Astra Television Awards	Best Cable Drama Ensemble	The Beauty	Nominated	
2026	Astra Television Awards	Best Supporting Actress in a Drama Series	Rebecca Hall	Nominated	
2026	Astra Television Awards	Best Guest Actress in a Drama Series	Isabella Rossellini	Nominated	
2026	Critics' Choice Super Awards	Best Horror Series, Limited Series or Made-for-TV Movie	The Beauty	Nominated	

== Impact ==
Following the release of The Beauty, renewed interest emerged in the original comic, The Beauty #1, published by Image Comics. The issue appeared on Key Collector Comics' "Trending 20" list and was featured by the YouTube channel ComicTom101 in its "Hot 10" rankings over multiple consecutive weeks. Secondary market activity increased, with raw copies reportedly selling for as much as $64 on eBay, while higher-grade and later printings recorded correspondingly higher prices. During the week of the series' premiere, The Beauty #1 placed No. 7 among trending comics in the United States and was reported to have reached a sale price of $199 for a CGC 9.8 copy, with a near-mint fair market value of $53 for raw copies.
