= Glee (TV series) =

American television series (2009–2015)

- Genre: Jukebox musical; Comedy-drama; Romantic comedy; Teen drama
- Created by: Ryan Murphy; Brad Falchuk; Ian Brennan
- Showrunner: Ryan Murphy
- Starring: Dianna Agron; Chris Colfer; Jessalyn Gilsig; Jane Lynch; Jayma Mays; Kevin McHale; Lea Michele; Cory Monteith; Matthew Morrison; Amber Riley; Mark Salling; Jenna Ushkowitz; Heather Morris; Mike O'Malley; Naya Rivera; Darren Criss; Harry Shum Jr.; Chord Overstreet; Jacob Artist; Melissa Benoist; Blake Jenner; Alex Newell; Becca Tobin; Dot-Marie Jones
- Ending theme: "Time for Some Girl Talk"
- Composer: James S. Levine
- Country of origin: United States
- Original language: English
- No. of seasons: 6
- No. of episodes: 121 (list of episodes)

Production
- Executive producers: Ryan Murphy; Brad Falchuk; Dante Di Loreto; Ian Brennan; Russel Friend; Garrett Lerner; Bradley Buecker; Matthew Morrison (season 6)
- Producers: Alexis Martin Woodall; Michael Novick; Kenneth Silverstein; Robert Del Valle; Roberto Aguirre-Sacasa
- Production locations: Hollywood, California
- Cinematography: Christopher Baffa; Michael Goi; Joaquin Sedillo
- Camera setup: Single-camera
- Running time: 40–48 minutes 58 minutes (season 2, episode 18)
- Production companies: Brad Falchuk Teley-Vision; Ryan Murphy Productions; 20th Century Fox Television

Original release
- Network: Fox
- Release: May 19, 2009 – March 20, 2015

Related
- The Glee Project

Glee (stylized in all lowercase as glee) is an American jukebox musical comedy-drama television series created by Ryan Murphy, Brad Falchuk, and Ian Brennan for the Fox Broadcasting Company. Set at the fictional William McKinley High School in Lima, Ohio, the series follows the members of the New Directions, a glee club competing in the show choir circuit, as they navigate social issues regarding sexuality, gender, race, family, relationships, and teamwork. Each episode features on-screen musical performances chosen by Murphy and produced by Adam Anders and Peer Åström, ranging from show tunes to chart hits.

Conceived by Brennan as a feature film, Glee was primarily written by him, Murphy, and Falchuk in its first two seasons; Murphy and Falchuk also served as the initial directors. The pilot episode was broadcast on May 19, 2009, with the first season officially premiering on September 9 later that year. In 2013, Murphy announced that the sixth season would be the series' last. Glee concluded on March 20, 2015, after 121 episodes and over 729 musical performances.

Glee received generally favorable reviews for its first season, while reception to the later five varied. Its accolades include six Primetime Emmy Awards, four Golden Globe Awards, and the 2009 Screen Actors Guild Award for Outstanding Performance by an Ensemble in a Comedy Series. Fox chose the show as the lead-out program for its coverage of Super Bowl XLV in 2011. The series' music accumulated over 36 million digital single sales and 11 million album sales worldwide through October 2011. The cast embarked on live concert tours following the first and second seasons; a concert film based on the 2011 tour had a limited theatrical release that August. Other merchandise includes DVD and Blu-ray releases, an iPad application, and karaoke games for the Wii.

A sequel to the series is in the works for Disney+ and Hulu, with Murphy, Falchuk and Brennan returning. Lea Michele is confirmed to reprise her role as Rachel Berry, Chord Overstreet is confirmed to reprise his role as Sam Evans, and Heather Morris has been confirmed to reprise her role as Brittany S. Pierce for the 2027 revival series.

== Series overview ==
Season	Episodes	Originally released		Average total viewers including DVR (millions)	Rank
Season	Episodes	First released	Last released	Average total viewers including DVR (millions)	Rank
1	22	May 19, 2009	June 8, 2010	9.77	33
2	22	September 21, 2010	May 24, 2011	10.11	43
3	22	September 20, 2011	May 22, 2012	8.71	56
4	22	September 13, 2012	May 9, 2013	8.26	50
5	20	September 26, 2013	May 13, 2014	4.57	105
6	13	January 9, 2015	March 20, 2015	3.14	148

The series centers on a show choir and glee club at the fictional William McKinley High School in Lima, Ohio. Spanish teacher Will Schuester (Matthew Morrison) takes over the club after former teacher Sandy Ryerson (Stephen Tobolowsky) is fired for inappropriate conduct. Will's attempts to restore the renamed "New Directions" to its former glory are made difficult due to marital issues with his wife Terri Schuester (Jessalyn Gilsig) and his developing feelings for his co-worker, guidance counselor Emma Pillsbury (Jayma Mays). Will must also defend the glee club's existence from scheming cheerleading coach Sue Sylvester (Jane Lynch) and at times, school Principal Principal Figgins (Iqbal Theba). The series gives focus to the lives of the eventual members of the New Directions: their romances, their love of singing and desire for popularity clashing with their membership in the low-status club, and the many vicissitudes that come with high school and teen-hood.

The first season follows the New Directions competing for the first time on the show choir circuit, from their win at the Sectionals competition (episode 13) to their loss at Regionals (episode 22). Social issues explored in this season include sex, relationship problems, homosexuality, teenage pregnancy, disabilities, and acceptance. The inaugural members of the New Directions include Rachel Berry (Lea Michele), an ambitious performer driven by her dreams of becoming a Broadway theatre star; Finn Hudson (Cory Monteith), the school's sometimes-slow-witted star quarterback; Artie Abrams (Kevin McHale), a boy with a physical disability; Kurt Hummel (Chris Colfer), an effeminate, openly gay boy; Mercedes Jones (Amber Riley), an aspiring vocal diva whose talents go unrecognized; Tina Cohen-Chang (Jenna Ushkowitz), a shy goth longing to be popular; Noah "Puck" Puckerman (Mark Salling), a delinquent in need of direction; and Quinn Fabray (Dianna Agron), a popular cheerleader who experiences a teenage pregnancy.

The second season follows the club through wins at Sectionals (episode 9) and Regionals (episode 16) before losing at the Nationals competition in New York City (episode 22), while dealing with relationship problems, religion, homophobia, bullying, rumors, teenage drinking, and death. Club members promoted to the main cast this season include Santana Lopez (Naya Rivera), a snarky, cynical cheerleader struggling with her sexuality; Brittany S. Pierce (Heather Morris), a ditzy, promiscuous cheerleader who later dates Santana; and Kurt's father Burt Hummel (Mike O'Malley).

Characters like Santana Lopez and Kurt Hummel brought in LGBTQ+ storylines which was new to primetime television. This show helped to set a foundation in media while addressing themes of coming out, bullying, and acceptance. Additionally, the show featured multiple characters from multiple different backgrounds such as Mercedes Jones and Mike Chang, showing ethnic imbalances and inequalities within high school settings.

The third season follows the club through wins at Sectionals (episode 8), Regionals (episode 14), and their first win at Nationals (episode 21) in Chicago, while dealing with gender identity, adoption, domestic abuse, teenage suicide, bullying, disabilities, texting while driving, and college prospects. Two club members were promoted to the main cast: Mike Chang (Harry Shum Jr.), a soft-spoken athlete-turned-dancer with unsupportive parents, and Blaine Anderson (Darren Criss), a Dalton Academy transfer student who dates Kurt. Terri (Jessalyn Gilsig) was written out of the series while Burt (Mike O'Malley) returned to recurring status. At the end of the season, the McKinley High class of 2012 graduates.

The fourth season introduces a new generation of McKinley students while following certain graduates from the previous season, notably Rachel and Kurt at the fictional New York Academy of the Dramatic Arts (NYADA) in New York City. The season follows the club through their loss and subsequent reinstatement at Sectionals (episodes 9 and 12) before winning at Regionals (episode 22), marking their third consecutive appearance at Nationals. Rachel and Kurt, meanwhile, navigate NYADA and their lives as aspiring performers atop their relationships with Finn and Blaine. Issues explored in the season include sex, bulimia, gender identity, child molestation, dyslexia, school violence, and pregnancy scares. Former main cast members Emma (Jayma Mays) and Quinn (Dianna Agron) are credited as guest stars, while previously recurring glee club member Sam Evans (Chord Overstreet) was promoted to the main cast.

The fifth season, unlike previous seasons, continues the school year begun in the previous season. The New Directions finish second at Nationals (episode 11) before they are permanently disbanded by Sue Sylvester, now school principal (after framing Figgins in episode 1), for budgetary reasons (episode 12). Following graduation, the show jumps several months forward in time to focus on the alumni's lives in New York City for the remainder of the season, including Rachel's successful Broadway debut. Throughout this season, the club and its alumni deal with relationship issues, death and mourning, anger issues, body image, gay bashing, and intimacy. Several cast members dropped to recurring guest stars as of this season: Amber Riley (Mercedes), Mark Salling (Puck), Harry Shum Jr. (Mike), and Heather Morris (Brittany). New main cast members included glee club members introduced in the fourth season: Marley Rose (Melissa Benoist), a kind teenager who develops an eating disorder; Unique Adams (Alex Newell), a shy, nerdy teenager who becomes more bold and glamorous after coming out as transgender; Ryder Lynn (Blake Jenner), a dyslexic teen; Jake Puckerman (Jacob Artist), a biracial teen struggling with anger issues; Kitty Wilde (Becca Tobin), a Christian mean girl. Cory Monteith died in the summer before the fifth season was shot; Finn subsequently died off-screen in the third episode.

The sixth and final season sees Rachel return to McKinley after her television pilot fails and deciding to reconstitute the New Directions with all-new students and help from Kurt. Will now coaches rival club Vocal Adrenaline, while Blaine coaches the Dalton Academy Warblers. All of the new main cast members from the fifth season have returned to guest star status in the final season, as well as Santana (Naya Rivera) Tina (Jenna Ushkowitz); Mercedes (Amber Riley) rejoins the main cast, and Coach Beiste (Dot-Marie Jones) joins the main cast for the first time. Social issues faced by the characters this season include gay marriage, gender identity, and transitioning. The New Directions wins Nationals, Sue is fired as principal, and McKinley High is repurposed as a magnet arts school with Will as principal and Sam as director of New Directions. The finale jumps five years into the future: Rachel has married Jesse St. James (Jonathan Groff), won a Tony Award, and is a surrogate mother for Kurt and Blaine (who are themselves Broadway stars). Artie has directed Tina in a film, Mercedes is a highly successful recording artist, and Sue has just been re-elected Vice President of the United States. The McKinley auditorium is renamed after Finn.

== Cast and characters ==
In casting Glee, Murphy sought out actors who could identify with the rush of starring in theatrical roles. Instead of using traditional network casting calls, he spent three months on Broadway, where he found Matthew Morrison, who had previously starred on stage in Hairspray and The Light in the Piazza; Lea Michele, who starred in Spring Awakening; and Jenna Ushkowitz, who had been in the Broadway revival of The King and I.

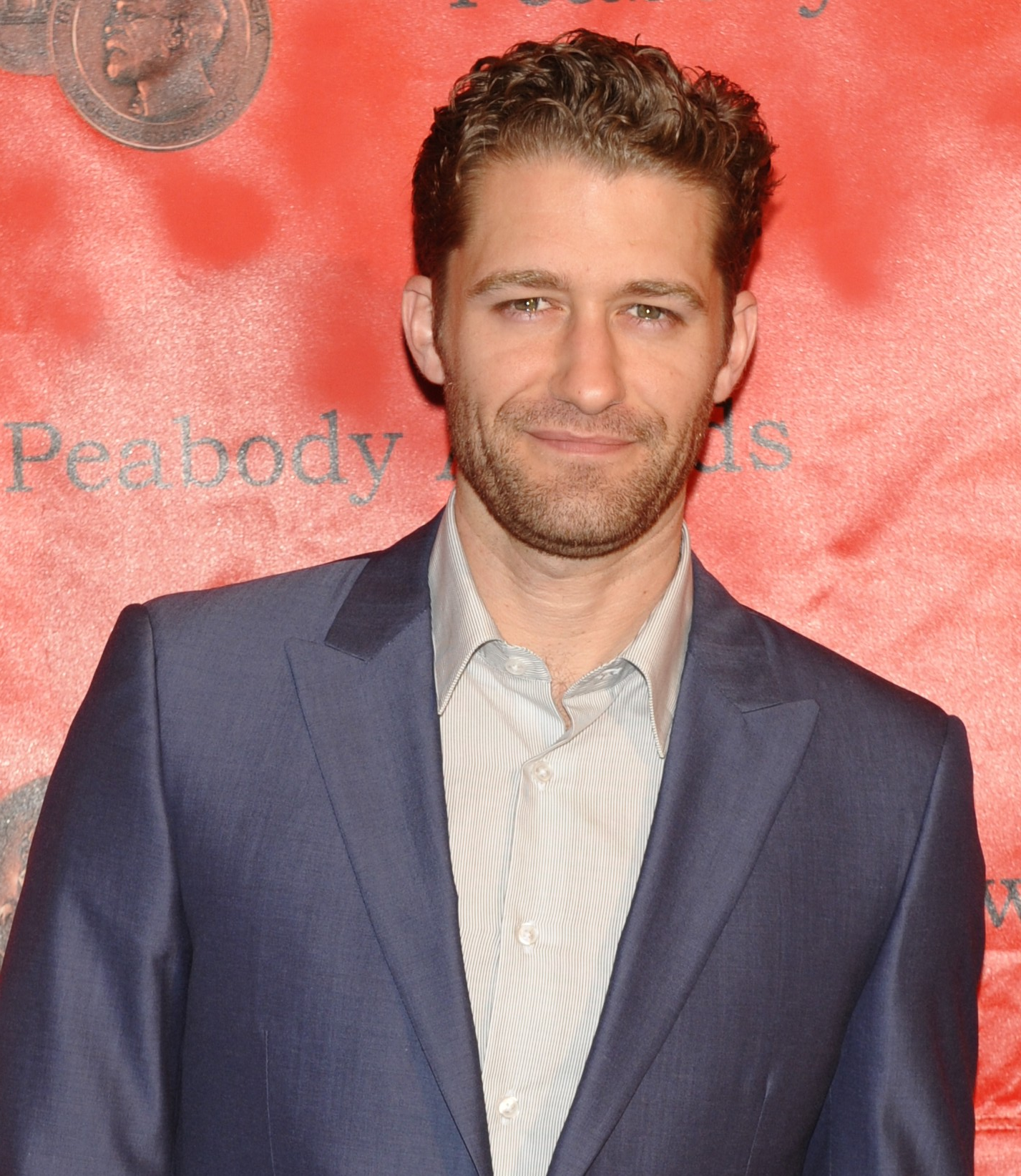
Matthew Morrison was cast after Murphy spent three months observing actors on Broadway.

During their auditions, actors without any theatrical experience needed to demonstrate that they could also sing and dance. Chris Colfer had no previous professional experience, but Murphy wrote in the character Kurt Hummel for him. Jayma Mays auditioned with the song "Touch-a, Touch-a, Touch-a, Touch Me" from The Rocky Horror Show, while Cory Monteith initially submitted a tape of himself acting only, and was requested to submit a second, musical tape, in which he sang "a cheesy, '80s music-video-style version" of REO Speedwagon's "Can't Fight This Feeling". Kevin McHale came from a boy-band background, having previously been part of the group Not Like Them. He explained that the diversity of the cast's backgrounds reflects the range of different musical styles within the show itself: "It's a mix of everything: classic rock, current stuff, R&B. Even the musical theatre stuff is switched up. You won't always recognize it." Jane Lynch was originally supposed to have a recurring role as Sue Sylvester, but was made a series regular when a Damon Wayans pilot she was working on for ABC fell through. The cast was contracted for three potential Glee films, with their contract stating that "[The actor] hereby grants Fox three exclusive, irrevocable options to engage [the actor] in up to, respectively, three feature-length motion pictures." Murphy said in December 2010 that he wasn't interested in doing a Glee movie "as a story", and added, "I might do it as a live concert thing." Glee: The 3D Concert Movie, filmed during the 2011 Glee Live! In Concert! tour and the only film related to the show, was released on August 12, 2011.

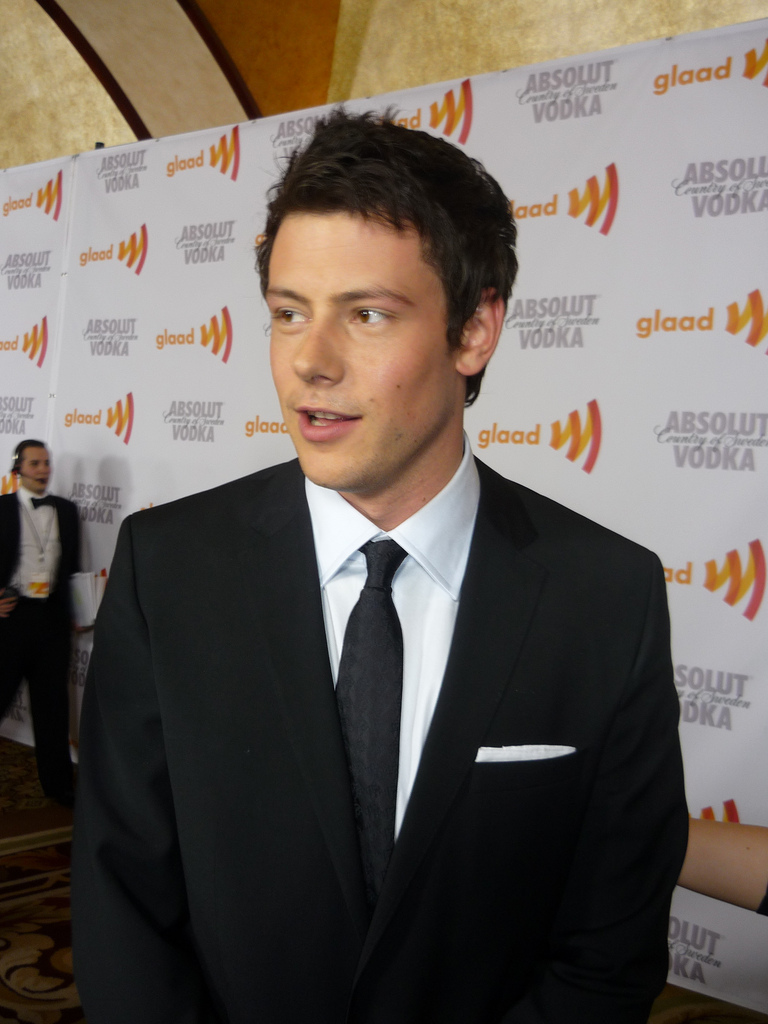
Cory Monteith portrayed glee club member Finn Hudson.

Glee featured as many as fifteen main roles with star billing, after starting with twelve. Morrison plays Will Schuester, McKinley High's Spanish teacher, who becomes glee-club director and hopes to restore it to its former glory. Lynch plays Sue Sylvester, head coach of the "Cheerios" cheerleading squad, and the Glee Club's nemesis. Mays appears as Emma Pillsbury, the school's mysophobic guidance counselor who has feelings for Will, and Jessalyn Gilsig plays Terri Schuester, Will's wife whom he eventually divorces after five years of marriage and the discovery that she has faked being pregnant instead of revealing she had suffered a false pregnancy. Michele plays Rachel Berry, talented star of the glee club whose ambition sometimes causes her to be insensitive toward others. Often bullied by the Cheerios and football players, she grows closer to them as the show progresses and begins an on-and-off relationship with Finn Hudson starting in season one; they become engaged in season three. Monteith played Finn, star quarterback of the school's football team who risks alienation by his friends after joining the glee club. Also in the club are Amber Riley as Mercedes Jones, a fashion-conscious diva who resents having to sing back-up but eventually finds her place in the choir; Colfer as Kurt Hummel, a fashionable gay man countertenor who is often bullied by the jocks in the school; McHale as Artie Abrams, a guitar player and paraplegic who longs to be seen for his personality rather than only his physical injuries; and Ushkowitz as Tina Cohen-Chang, a painfully shy Asian American student who fakes a speech impediment as a defense mechanism. Dianna Agron plays Quinn Fabray, Finn's cheerleader girlfriend, who later joins the glee club to keep an eye on him. Mark Salling plays Noah "Puck" Puckerman, a good friend of Finn's on the football team who at first disapproves of Finn joining the glee club, but later joins it himself. Naya Rivera and Heather Morris portray Cheerios and glee club vocalists Santana Lopez and Brittany S. Pierce respectively and were originally recurring actors, but were promoted to series regulars in the second season. Mike O'Malley, who plays Kurt's father Burt Hummel, also became a series regular on season two. Gilsig and O'Malley no longer appeared on the list of starring actors at the beginning of the third season, though O'Malley was a recurring guest star in at least six episodes during the season. Two actors were promoted to series regulars as of the third season: Harry Shum Jr. as football player and glee club member Mike Chang and Darren Criss as former Dalton Academy Warbler and new club member Blaine Anderson, both of whom started as recurring actors, Shum in the first season and Criss in the second. For the fourth season, Chord Overstreet, who started as a recurring actor in the second season, playing glee club member Sam Evans, was promoted to the main cast, while Agron and Mays were credited as recurring guest stars.

Many of the original characters graduated from McKinley High at the end of the third season. Murphy said, "We didn't want to have a show where they were in high school for eight years. We really wanted to be true to that experience." Adult characters played by Matthew Morrison and Jane Lynch remained to provide continuity to the series, though according to Falchuk, some students—Rachel, Finn and Kurt in particular—would likely remain on the show after they graduate. In May 2012, Murphy said that just because a character on the show graduates high school does not mean that they are leaving, "A lot of people have been writing Dianna's off the show, Amber's off the show — they're not off the show. I think Amber was talking about that bittersweet feeling of, 'I'll never be in the choir room with that exact group of people.' At least that's what she told me ... When I read that [tweet,] I said, 'I think people will misconstrue that.' She's excited about where her character is going. They all are. I wanted to do the right thing by all of them." He then continued: "They're all coming back. Anyone who is a regular is coming back. Everyone said yes."

On June 28, 2013, the media reported that Morris, Riley, Salling, and Shum would be changing from starring status to guest starring roles for the fifth season, and on the following day that Jacob Artist, Melissa Benoist, Blake Jenner, Alex Newell, and Becca Tobin (who play Jake Puckerman, Marley Rose, Ryder Lynn, Wade "Unique" Adams, and Kitty Wilde, respectively), were all being promoted to the show's main cast.

On July 13, 2013, Cory Monteith was found dead in his room at the Fairmont Pacific Rim hotel in Vancouver, British Columbia, after failing to check out. Staff were sent to his room where his body was discovered. An autopsy completed on July 15 indicated that he died of an accidental alcohol and heroin overdose. On July 20, 2013, Ryan Murphy said in various media outlets that Cory would have a tribute in season five's third episode, which would deal with the death of Monteith's character, Finn.

On July 30, 2013, Mays confirmed that she would depart the show after the fifth season to work on other projects, but stated that she would be open to returning as a guest star in the future.

On July 7, 2014, it was confirmed that Rivera and Ushkowitz would be placed on a recurring status for the sixth and final season. On August 28, a website revealed that Amber Riley would once again become a regular along with Dot-Marie Jones while Jayma Mays would be on a recurring status.

== Production ==
=== Conception ===
Ian Brennan conceived Glee based on his own experience as a member of the Prospect High School show choir in Mount Prospect, Illinois. He initially envisioned Glee as a film, rather than a television series, and wrote the first draft in August 2005 with the aid of Screenwriting for Dummies. He completed the script in 2005, but could not generate interest in the project for several years. Mike Novick, a television producer and a friend of Brennan's from Los Angeles, was a member of the same gym as Ryan Murphy, and gave him a copy of Brennan's script. Murphy had been in a show choir in college and felt he could relate to the script. Murphy and his Nip/Tuck colleague Brad Falchuk suggested that Glee be produced as a television show. The script was entirely rewritten, and was picked up by Fox within fifteen hours of being received. Murphy attributed that, in part, to the network's success with American Idol. "It made sense for the network with the biggest hit in TV, which is a musical, to do something in that vein," he said. Murphy and Falchuk became the show's executive producers and showrunners, Brennan became a co-executive producer and Novick a producer. Brennan, Falchuk and Murphy started by writing "all the episodes".

Glee is set at the fictional William McKinley High School in Lima, Ohio. Murphy chose a Midwest setting as he himself grew up in Indiana, and recalled childhood visits to Ohio to the Kings Island theme park. Although set in Lima, the show is filmed at Paramount Studios and Helen Bernstein High School in Hollywood.

Murphy has said that he has never seen a High School Musical film, to which Glee has been compared, and that his interest lay in creating a "postmodern musical", rather than "doing a show where people burst into song", drawing more heavily on the format of Chicago. Murphy intended the show to be a form of escapism. "There's so much on the air right now about people with guns, or sci-fi, or lawyers running around. This is a different genre, there's nothing like it on the air at the networks and cable. Everything's so dark in the world right now, that's why Idol worked. It's pure escapism," he said. Murphy intended to make a family show to appeal to adults as well as children, with adult characters starring equally alongside the teenage leads, and as of October 2009 he had already mapped out plans for the series covering three years of broadcast.

=== Writing ===
The three creators—Murphy, Falchuk, and Brennan—planned the stories together. For the first two seasons, they were the only writers, and after taking joint credit for the pilot episode and the episode that opened the fall 2009 season, they began rotating taking a single auctorial credit, based in large part on the person "who's taken the lead in story breaking or who wrote a draft". Brennan noted that the writing process is "fast and loose, with the emphasis on fast", and quotes Murphy as having said, in terms of their roles in episode creation, "I'm sort of the brain. Brad's sort of the heart. Ian's sort of the funny bone", which Brennan says "is true in a lot of ways". Some of the characters are written more by one writer than by the others. Brennan writes most of Sue's material, and Falchuk frequently writes the scenes between Kurt and Burt Hummel, though Murphy contributes a great deal to Kurt.

Starting with season three, a writing staff of six was hired: Ali Adler, Roberto Aguirre-Sacasa, Marti Noxon, Michael Hitchcock, Matthew Hodgson and Ross Maxwell. The season's fourth episode, "Pot o' Gold", was written by Adler, the first not credited to the show's three creators.

Adler and Noxon did not return for the show's fourth season and instead House writers Russel Friend and Garrett Lerner, and Stacy Traub were hired.

=== Music and choreography ===
The series features numerous song covers sung onscreen by the characters. Ryan Murphy was responsible for selecting all of the songs used, and has said that he strove to maintain a balance between chart hits and show tunes: "I want there to be something for everybody in every episode. That's a tricky mix, but that's very important—the balancing of that." According to Murphy, the song choices are integral to script development, "Each episode has a theme at its core. After I write the script, I will choose songs that help to move the story along." In a 2010 interview with Allison Kugel, Chris Colfer noted that "there have been a couple of times when I have gone to Ryan Murphy (Glee creator) and told him a couple of things that have happened to me, and then he writes it into the show. Or he'll ask me what song I would want to sing, in this situation or in that situation. I don't think any of us directly try to give input on the character or on the storyline, but they definitely steal things from us." For the second season, a shift toward using more Top 40 songs was seen, in an effort to appeal more to the 18–49 demographic.

Murphy was surprised at the ease with which use of songs was approved by the record labels approached, and explained: "I think the key to it is they loved the tone of it. They loved that this show was about optimism and young kids, for the most part, reinterpreting their classics for a new audience." A minority of those approached refused to allow their music to be used, including Bryan Adams, Guns N' Roses and Coldplay; however, in June 2010, Coldplay reversed their decision, allowing Glee the rights to their catalog. Adams posted on his Twitter account that the producers of Glee had never requested permission from him and urged them to "pick up the phone". Composer and musician Billy Joel offered many of his songs for use on the show, and other artists have offered use of their songs for free. A series of Glee soundtrack albums have been released through Columbia Records. Songs featured on the show were available for digital download through iTunes up to two weeks before new episodes aired, and through other digital outlets and mobile carriers a week later. Glee music producers Adam Anders and Peer Astrom began to add original music to the show, including two original songs, "Loser like Me" and "Get It Right", on the March 15, 2011, episode.

Glee was choreographed by Zach Woodlee and featured four to eight production numbers per episode. Once Murphy selected a song, rights were cleared with its publishers by music supervisor P. J. Bloom, and music producers Adam Anders and Peer Astrom rearranged it for the Glee cast. Numbers were pre-recorded by the cast, while Woodlee constructed the accompanying dance moves, which were then taught to the cast and filmed. Studio recordings of tracks were then made. The process began six to eight weeks before each episode was filmed, and could end as late as the day before filming began. Each episode cost at least $3 million to produce, and could take up to ten days to film as a result of the elaborate choreography. In late 2010, Bloom reported the process had been even shorter; "as quick as a few weeks". For the second season, the creators were offered listens of upcoming songs in advance by publishers and record labels, with production occurring even before song rights were cleared.

=== Promotion ===
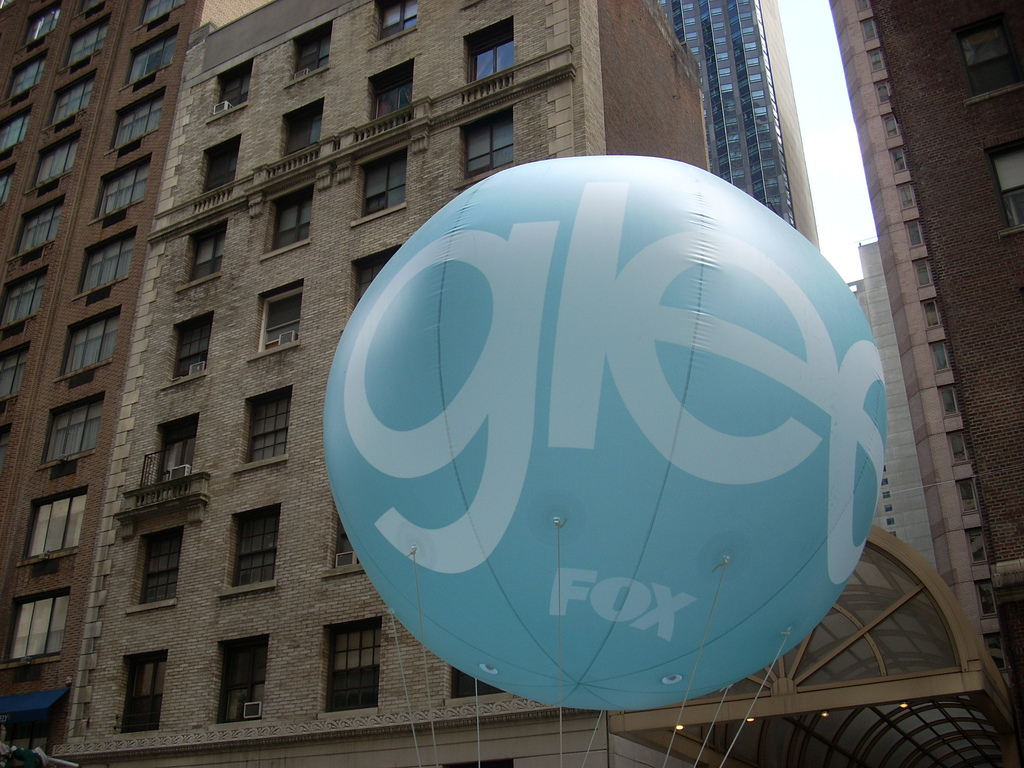
A promotional balloon for Glee in New York City.

Prior to the second episode's premiere, Glee's cast went on tour at several Hot Topic stores across the nation. The cast sang the U.S. national anthem at the third game of the 2009 World Series. Macy's invited them to perform at the 2009 Macy's Thanksgiving Day Parade, but host broadcaster NBC declined because Glee aired on a rival network. Ryan Murphy commented on the cast's exclusion: "I completely understand NBC's position, and look forward to seeing a Jay Leno float."

The show's success sent the cast on a concert tour, Glee Live! In Concert! after the first season's wrapup. They visited Phoenix, Chicago, Los Angeles, and New York. The cast also recorded a cover of Wham!'s "Last Christmas", which was released as a single in late 2009 but didn't appear in the show until "A Very Glee Christmas" on December 10, 2010. Morrison, Lynch, Michele, Monteith, and Colfer reprised their roles as Will, Sue, Rachel, Finn, and Kurt respectively for a cameo appearance in an episode of The Cleveland Show that aired January 16, 2011. Michele, Monteith, and Riley appeared as campers in the twenty-second season premiere of The Simpsons.

Lynch, Colfer, Monteith, and Riley appeared at the 2010 MTV VMAs on September 12, 2010. When Agron, Michele, and Monteith posed for a set of risqué photos for the November 2010 edition of GQ magazine, Parents Television Council (PTC) criticized the show; PTC president Tim Winter commented that Glee has many young fans, and that "by authorizing this kind of near-pornographic display, the creators of the program have established their intentions on the show's direction. And it isn't good for families."

The promotional posters for the first season have the show's stars using their right hands to make an "L" to fill in the L of the word Glee. The second season's promotional posters have the stars throwing slushies at the camera in pairs. The third season's promotional posters have the stars getting dodgeballs thrown at them by Sue Sylvester. While the cast concert tour, Glee Live! In Concert!, began on May 15, 2010, and presented concerts in four cities in the US that month, the second edition, with an almost-entirely new set list, toured for four weeks in the US and Canada from May 21 through June 18, 2011, and followed with twelve days in England and Ireland, from June 22 through July 3, 2011. The cast also performed on the seventh season of The X Factor on December 5, 2010.

=== Revival ===
In 2020, celebrating the show's 11-year anniversary, Ryan Murphy made an Instagram post about his idea of re-doing the show's pilot with Lea Michele, Ben Platt, and Beanie Feldstein. Murphy eventually deleted the post. In 2021, Fox President Michael Thorn revealed he was interested in reviving past Fox programs, most notably 24 and Glee. In 2022, in an interview with Kevin McHale and Jenna Ushkowitz, Ryan Murphy revealed he was interested in re-examining the series as a brand through a reboot or a Broadway musical. In July 2026, Murphy reaffirmed his interest in revisiting the series. Two months later Murphy confirmed that he had finished the script for a reboot and was in contact with at least ten cast members regarding potential returns. A revival of the series was officially ordered by Disney+ and Hulu in October 2026. There are no details of returning original cast members, or if the show's returning creators are officially back on. So far, only a social media post on October 21, 2026, was published on the official Glee instagram confirming the reboot.

== Broadcast ==
The first season of Glee consists of twenty-two episodes. The pilot episode was originally broadcast on May 19, 2009. The series returned on September 9, 2009, airing an additional twelve episodes on Wednesdays in the 9:00 pm timeslot until December 9, 2009, for a total of thirteen episodes. On September 21, 2009, nine more episodes were ordered for the first season by Fox, and the first of these episodes was broadcast on April 13, 2010. These episodes aired on Tuesday evenings at 9:00 pm. On January 11, 2010, it was announced that Fox had commissioned a second season of the show. The second season began production in June 2010. Season two began on September 21, 2010, airing in the 8:00 pm time slot on Tuesdays, and consists of twenty-two episodes. The show was chosen by Fox to fill the coveted timeslot that followed the network's coverage of Super Bowl XLV in 2011, and the network originally planned to move the show to the 9:00 pm time slot on Wednesdays following the post–Super Bowl broadcast. However, Fox later revised its schedule, leaving Glee on Tuesdays in order to concentrate on building up its weaker Wednesday and Thursday line-ups. A third season was ordered by Fox on May 23, 2010, before the end of the first season. The early renewal of the show allowed the production team to cut costs and to plan ahead when writing scripts. The third season broadcasts remained in the show's Tuesday 8:00 pm time slot, and began airing on September 20, 2011. The show's fourth season changed both date and time of broadcast: it moved to Thursdays in the 9:00 pm time slot, and aired after that evening's 8:00 pm music competition "results" shows—The X Factor in the fall and American Idol in midseason. The show was renewed for both a fifth and sixth season at the same time, on April 19, 2013. Reruns were also syndicated to local US stations from 2013 to 2015.

Glee has been syndicated for broadcast in many countries worldwide, including Australia, where cast members visited to promote the show prior to its September 2009 debut on Network Ten. Midway through season four, Glee was moved to Network Ten's digital channel Eleven due to poor ratings. It also airs in Canada on City and, previously, Global, New Zealand, Fiji, and Trinidad and Tobago. It is broadcast in South Africa, where Fox beams the episodes directly to the M-Net broadcast center in Johannesburg rather than delivering the tapes. Asian countries that broadcast Glee include Bangladesh, the Philippines, India, Malaysia, and Singapore and Myanmar.

All the episodes of the series were announced to be arriving on Disney+ in Latin America in February 2021. In the United States, the series was made available on Disney+ and Hulu starting on June 1, 2022, following its December 2021 departure from Netflix after over seven years, as well as a year on Prime Video.

=== British trademark dispute ===
In the United Kingdom, E4 broadcast the first two seasons of Glee, showing episodes months after they were first aired in the United States. Sky 1 broadcast the series starting with the third season, airing episodes two days after their American broadcast. However, the show has come under a trademark dispute in the United Kingdom with the Glee Club, a small chain of independent live stand-up comedy and live music venues. In February 2014, a High Court judge ruled that the show "diluted and tarnished" the reputation of the comedy club chain. In a later ruling in July 2014, the High Court ordered Fox to use a different title for the show in the UK, saying there was a "likelihood of confusion" between the two brands. In February 2016, Fox lost an appeal against the decision.

== Merchandise ==
Three soundtrack albums were released to accompany Glee's first season: Glee: The Music, Volume 1, Glee: The Music, Volume 2 and Glee: The Music, Volume 3 Showstoppers. Two extended plays (EP) accompanied the episodes "The Power of Madonna" and "Journey to Regionals": Glee: The Music, The Power of Madonna and Glee: The Music, Journey to Regionals respectively. Glee: The Music, The Complete Season One, a compilation album featuring all 100 studio recordings from the first season, was released exclusively to the iTunes Store. Five soundtrack albums were released to accompany Glee's second season: Glee: The Music, The Christmas Album, featuring Christmas-themed songs, and Glee: The Music, Volume 4, were both released in November 2010; Glee: The Music, Volume 5, Glee: The Music Presents the Warblers, and Glee: The Music, Volume 6 were 2011 releases, in March, April, and May, respectively. An EP entitled Glee: The Music, The Rocky Horror Glee Show was released to accompany the Halloween episode, "The Rocky Horror Glee Show". Two EPs were released exclusively at the Target discount chain: Glee: The Music, Love Songs in the last week of 2010, and Glee: The Music, Dance Party in early September 2011.

Glee has been released on several DVD and Blu-ray box-sets. Glee – Pilot Episode: Director's Cut features the pilot episode and a preview of the second episode, "Showmance". Glee – Volume 1: Road to Sectionals contains the first thirteen episodes of season one, and Glee – Volume 2: Road to Regionals contains the final nine episodes of the first season. Glee – The Complete First Season was released on September 13, 2010. Three boxed sets were released for the second season: Glee Season 2: Volume 1 containing the first ten episodes on January 25, 2011, and both Glee Season 2: Volume 2 with the final twelve episode and Glee: The Complete Second Season with all twenty-two on September 13, 2011. All three were released on DVD; only the complete season is available on Blu-ray.

Little, Brown Books has published three Glee-related young adult novels, all of which were developed in collaboration with the show's producers and writers. All three have been written by Sophia Lowell; the first, Glee: The Beginning, was released in August 2010 and serves as a prequel to the events of the television series. Subsequent novels include Glee: Foreign Exchange, released in February 2011, and Glee: Summer Break, released in July 2011.

Twentieth Century Fox Consumer Products have plans for a line of Glee-related merchandise including games, electrical products, greeting cards, apparel and stationery. Macy's carry a line of Glee-related clothing, and Claire's stock accessories.

Halfbrick Studios published a Glee content version of the mobile game Band Stars by Six Foot Kid in collaboration with Fox Digital Entertainment on March 27, 2014, currently available on iOS platforms, but with plans to release to Android. The game is available for free download with some Glee content available immediately including Kurt Hummel and Will Schuester. 12 characters from the Glee TV show are available for purchase and download in two separate packs. Pack 1 contains: Rachel Berry, Mercedes Jones, Noah (Puck) Puckerman, Jake Puckerman, Sam Evans, and Quinn Fabray. Pack 2 contains: Artie Abrams, Tina Cohen-Chang, Blaine Anderson, Santana Lopez, Brittany S. Pierce and Unique Adams.

== Reception ==
=== Ratings ===
The pilot episode of Glee averaged 9.62 million viewers, and the following eleven episodes attained between 6.10 and 7.65 million. The mid-season finale was watched by 8.13 million viewers, with the show returning in April 2010 to a season high of 13.66 million viewers. The following six episodes attained between 11.49 and 12.98 million viewers, falling to 8.99 million for the penultimate episode "Funk". Viewing figures rose to 11.07 million viewers for the season finale, giving Glee the highest finale rating for a new show in the 2009–10 television season. Only the first twenty episodes of the first season were accounted for when calculating the season average due to the final two episodes airing outside the traditional sweeps period. On February 6, 2011, after the Super Bowl, Glee received its highest ever ratings, with over 26.8 million tuning in to see the special episode, with a peak of 39.5 million.

In 2011, Glee generated $2 million advertising revenue per half-hour. In 2012, the show was the fourth-highest revenue earning show of the year, with US$2.83 million ad revenue per half-hour, behind Two and a Half Men, The X Factor and American Idol.

Viewership and ratings per season of Glee
Season	Episodes	First aired		Last aired		TV season	Viewership rank	Avg. viewers (millions)	18–49 rank	Avg. 18–49 rating
Season	Episodes	Date	Viewers (millions)	Date	Viewers (millions)	TV season	Viewership rank	Avg. viewers (millions)	18–49 rank	Avg. 18–49 rating
1	22	May 19, 2009	9.62	June 8, 2010	10.92	2009–10	33	9.77	15	4.3/11
2	22	September 21, 2010	12.45	May 24, 2011	11.80	2010–11	43	10.11	43	6.0
3	22	September 20, 2011	9.21	May 22, 2012	7.46	2011–12	56	8.71	25	3.6/10
4	22	September 13, 2012	7.41	May 9, 2013	5.92	2012–13	50	8.26	25	3.3
5	20	September 26, 2013	5.06	May 13, 2014	1.87	2013–14	105	4.57	77	2.2
6	13	January 9, 2015	2.34	March 20, 2015	2.54	2014–15	148	3.14	120	1.2

=== Critical reception ===
Critical response of Glee
Season	Rotten Tomatoes	Metacritic
1	88% (49 reviews)	78 (19 reviews)
2	79% (29 reviews)	76 (11 reviews)
3	53% (19 reviews)	—N/a
4	65% (23 reviews)	73 (6 reviews)
5	71% (14 reviews)	—N/a
6	72% (18 reviews)	—N/a

Glee received a Metacritic score of 78 out of 100 in its first season, based on reviews by eighteen critics, indicating "generally favorable reviews". It was praised by several critics in year-end "best of" reviews in 2009. James Poniewozik of Time ranked it the eighth best television show of the year, commenting: "when Glee works—which is often—it is transcendent, tear-jerking and thrilling like nothing else on TV." Entertainment Weekly's Ken Tucker ranked it ninth, calling it "Hands down the year's most novel show [and] also its least likely success", Lisa Respers France of CNN wrote that while ordinarily Glee's premise would have been "a recipe for disaster", the show has "such quirky charm and bravado that it is impossible not to get swept up". Reviews for subsequent seasons on Metacritic, reflecting their initial episodes, were not quite as good—the second season's score was 76 out of 100 from eleven reviews, and the fourth season received a score of 73 out of 100 from six reviews. Even with these stellar reviews from a multitude of critics, Glee's later seasons lost millions of viewers.

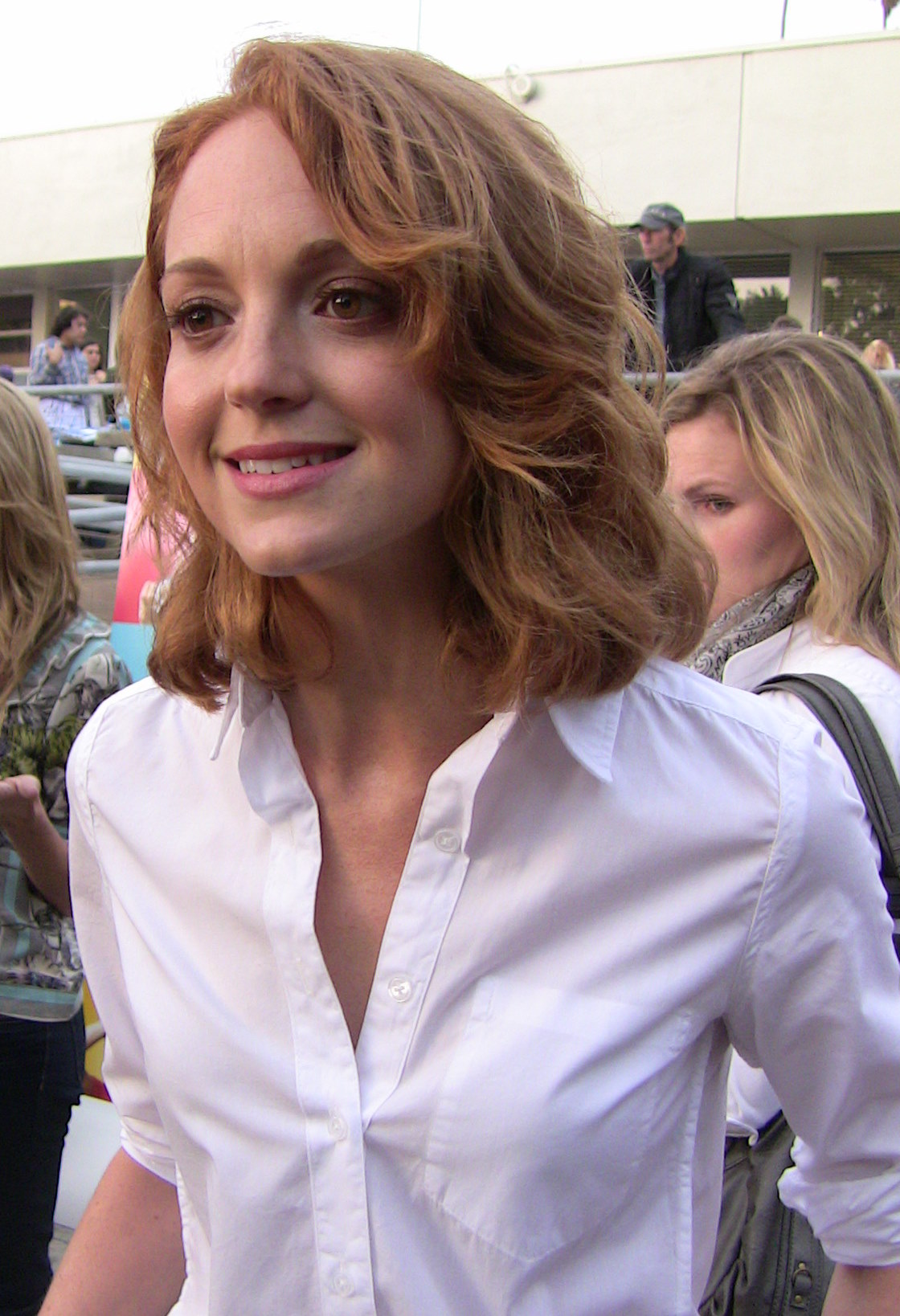
Variety's Brian Lowry said that Jayma Mays as Emma offered "modest redemption" to an adult cast of "over-the-top buffoons".

Nancy Gibbs of Time magazine wrote that she had heard the series described as "anti-Christian" by a youth minister, and commented:

It is easy to see his point, if you look at the specifics. ... The students lie, they cheat, they steal, they lust, they lace the bake-sale cupcakes with pot in order to give the student body a severe case of the munchies. Nearly all the Ten Commandments get violated at one point or another, while the audience is invited to laugh at people's pain and folly and humiliation. ... It insults kids to suggest that simply watching Characters Behaving Badly onscreen means they'll take that as permission to do the same themselves. ... And it's set in high school, meaning it's about a journey not just to college and career but to identity and conviction, the price of popularity, the compromises we must make between what we want and what we need.

Variety's Brian Lowry was critical of the show's early episodes, highlighting acting and characterization issues and deeming the adult cast "over-the-top buffoons", with the exception of Mays' Emma, who he felt offered "modest redemption". Though he praised Colfer and Michele's performances, Lowry wrote that the show's talent was squandered by its "jokey, cartoonish, wildly uneven tone", deeming the series a "one-hit wonder". Following the show's mid-season finale, Lowry wrote that while Glee "remains a frustrating mess at times", its "vibrant musical numbers and talented cast have consistently kept it on [his] TiVo must list" conceding that "even with its flaws, TV would be poorer without Glee."

As Glee's initial success pulled in a large audience, John Doyle of The Globe and Mail wrote that the early shows "felt fresh, mainly because the motley crew of kids had a kind of square naïveté." Doyle notes that the early success took Glee away from its original characters and plot, focusing more on celebrity guests. "The gaiety is gone from Glee. You should have set it in its prime, mere months ago". Matthew Gilbert of The Boston Globe similarly wrote that "It has become a powerful, promotional machine, long on hype and short on the human feeling—the glee—that once made it so addictive."

=== Music ===
The show's 754 musical performances, with each performance delivering an individual song or a mashup of two or more songs in a single performance, have led to commercial success, with over thirty-six million copies of Glee cast single releases purchased digitally, and over eleven million albums purchased worldwide through October 2011. In 2009, the Glee cast had twenty-five singles chart on the Billboard Hot 100, the most by any artist since The Beatles had thirty-one songs in the chart in 1964; in 2010, it placed eighty singles on the Billboard Hot 100, far outstripping the previous record. In February 2011, Glee surpassed Elvis Presley as the act with the most songs placed on the Billboard Hot 100 chart, though fewer than one-fourth of them have charted for more than one week. The cast performance of "Don't Stop Believin'" was certified gold on October 13, 2009, achieving over 500,000 digital sales, and on March 16, 2011, received platinum certification for having sales of over a million. The series' cover version had a positive effect on sales of Rihanna's "Take a Bow", which increased by 189 percent after the song was covered in the Glee episode "Showmance".

However, there has also been critical condemnation of the cast performances. Jon Dolan of Rolling Stone commented that Matthew Morrison "couldn't rap his way out of a 98° rehearsal", and AllMusic's Andrew Leahey wrote that Cory Monteith and Dianna Agron "can't sing nearly as well as their co-stars". E! Online's Joal Ryan criticized the show for its "overproduced soundtrack" and complained that many songs rely too heavily on the pitch-correcting software Auto-Tune: "For every too-brief moment of Lea Michele sounding raw—and lovely—on a "What a Girl Wants", or Monteith singing a perfectly credible REO Speedwagon in the shower, there's Michele and Monteith sounding like 1990s-era Cher on "No Air", or Monteith sounding like the Monteith XRZ-200 on the out-of-the-shower version of "Can't Fight This Feeling".

During the second season, Rob Sheffield for Rolling Stone noted the Britney Spears and Rocky Horror tribute episodes as examples when he lauded Glee and its choice of music. He praised Murphy for his selection and resurrection of "forgotten" pop songs and compared the show's uniqueness to "MTV in its prime" as the embodiment of popular culture.

Some artists, including Slash, Kings of Leon and Foo Fighters, have declined to have their songs used on the show. Murphy has been publicly critical of these refusals, which has led to exchanges in the press between him and a number of artists. The cover of Sir Mix-a-Lot's "Baby Got Back" in the season four episode "Sadie Hawkins" was particularly criticized by Jonathan Coulton for borrowing the melody (and allegedly portions of the recording) of Coulton's rendition of the song without credit or permission. Other artists have come forward with allegations of plagiarism in light of this development. It was reported that musician Prince had not given permission for Glee to cover his hit "Kiss" before filming the performance of the cover. Gorillaz founder Damon Albarn said on CBC Radio One that he would not let the show cover any Gorillaz songs: "Firstly, write your own songs. Two, have your own identity and stop being the ... slaves of TV producers ... who don't give a shit about you."

=== Fandom ===
Fans of Glee are commonly referred to as "Gleeks", a portmanteau of "Glee" and "geek". In the summer of 2009, the cast stopped at select Hot Topic stores on a "Gleek Tour" to promote the series' debut. Also in 2009, Fox ran a "Biggest GLEEK" competition, measuring fans' Glee-related activity on social networking websites such as Facebook and MySpace, and found that the growth of the fanbase outpaced the network's science-fiction shows. In its initial seasons, Glee was one of TV's most tweeted-about shows. Fans have recreated many of its musical numbers in tribute to the show, sharing them on YouTube. Based on this trend, show producers included instrumental versions of some songs on the show's soundtracks.

Similarly, Glee fans have created portmanteaus of character couples, such as "Finchel" for Finn and Rachel, "Samcedes" for Sam and Mercedes, "Klaine" for Kurt and Blaine, and "Brittana" for Brittany and Santana. This fact has been referenced in various second-season episodes, notably "Furt", which is itself a coinage for the new stepbrothers Finn and Kurt, and "Rumours".

=== Awards and accolades ===
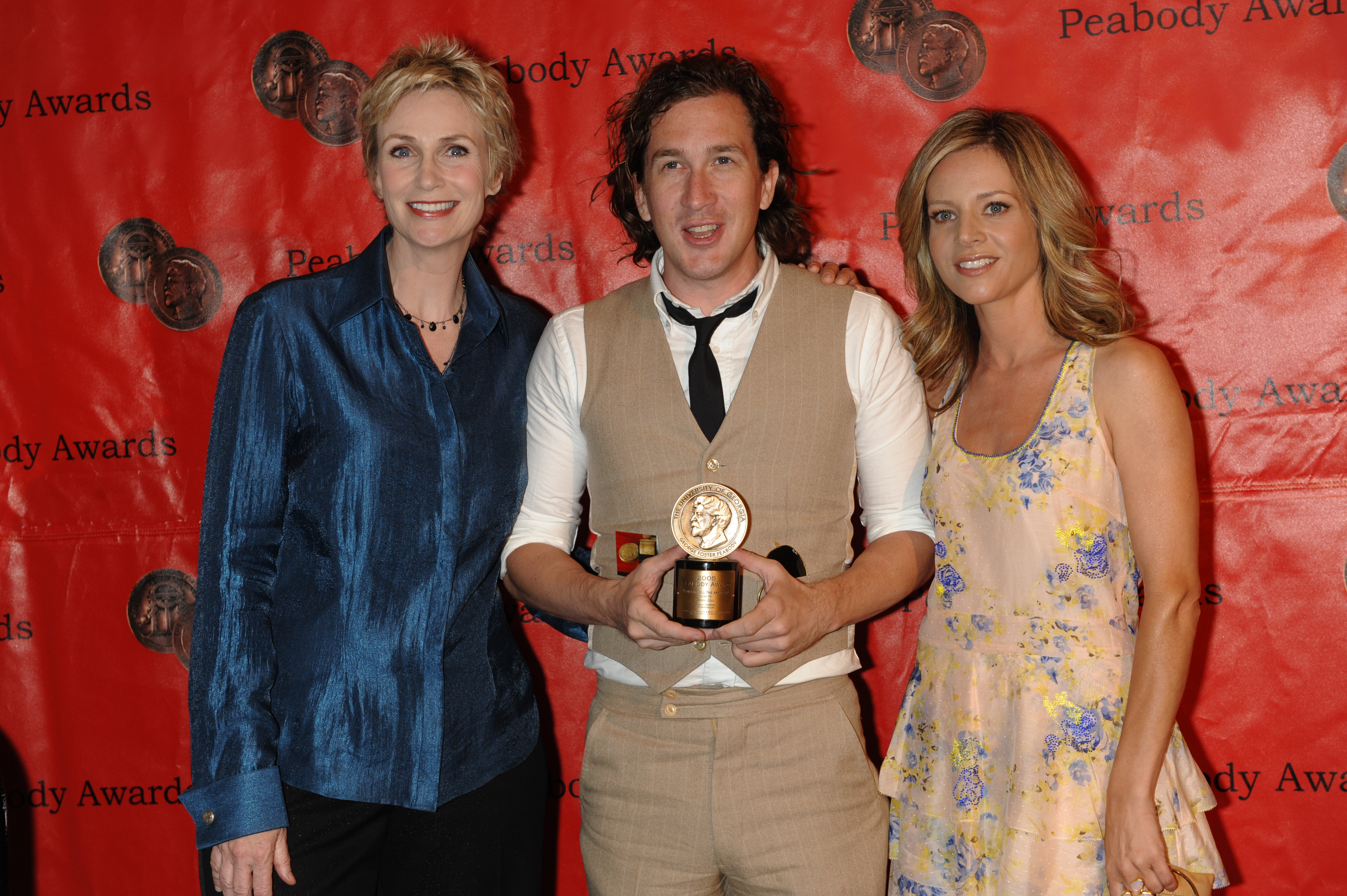
Jane Lynch, Ian Brennan and Jessalyn Gilsig at the 69th Annual Peabody Awards for Glee

Glee has received a number of awards and nominations. In 2009, the series won five Satellite Awards: "Best Musical or Comedy TV Series", "Best Actor" and "Actress in a Musical or Comedy TV Series" for Morrison and Michele, "Best Supporting Actress" for Lynch and "Special Achievement for Outstanding Guest Star" for Kristin Chenoweth. In 2010, the show won a Golden Globe Award for "Best Television Series – Musical or Comedy". Morrison, Michele and Lynch also received acting nominations. The series was nominated for two Writers Guild of America Awards, with screenplays nominated in the "Comedy Series" and "New Series" categories. It also won a Peabody Award in 2009. The Glee cast won the "Outstanding Performance by an Ensemble in a Comedy Series" award at the 16th Screen Actors Guild Awards. Paris Barclay and Ryan Murphy both received nominations for "Outstanding Directing – Comedy Series" at the Directors Guild of America Awards for their work on Glee. In July 2010, Glee received nineteen Emmy Award nominations, including "Outstanding Comedy Series", "Outstanding Lead Actor – Comedy Series" for Morrison and "Outstanding Lead Actress – Comedy Series" for Michele; it won four of these, including "Outstanding Supporting Actress in a Comedy Series" for Lynch and "Outstanding Guest Performance by a Male Actor in a Comedy Series" for Neil Patrick Harris. Paris Barclay was also nominated for a Primetime Emmy for Best Directing in a Comedy Series in 2010 for his episode "Wheels".

On January 16, 2011, the show won a Golden Globe for "Best Television Series – Musical or Comedy" and both Lynch and Colfer won Golden Globes for Best Supporting Actress and Best Supporting Actor in a Television Series, Miniseries, or TV Film. In July 2011, Glee received twelve Emmy nominations and won two: Gwyneth Paltrow was named Outstanding Guest Actress in a Comedy Series for her portrayal of Holly Holliday, and the show won the Outstanding Casting for a Comedy Series category. It received three Emmy nominations in July 2012, and four in July 2013. The whole cast was invited to sing at the White House by Michelle Obama in April 2010 for the annual Easter Egg Roll.

== Related media ==
=== Concert film ===
Glee: The Concert Movie, a concert film based on the four-week North American segment of the 2011 Glee Live! In Concert! tour and featuring the cast of the series in performance and backstage, was released in the United States and the United Kingdom on August 12, 2011, for a two-week limited engagement. The film is directed by Kevin Tancharoen.

=== Reality television ===
In summer 2010, Channel 5 in the United Kingdom aired Don't Stop Believing, a reality talent show inspired by Glee's success. The series featured live shows in which established and new musical performance groups competed against each other, performing well-known songs in new arrangements, with viewers voting on the winner. Solo singers were also sought to join a group to represent the United Kingdom on the American glee club circuit. Five's controller Richard Woolfe stated: "There's an explosion in musical performance groups and Don't Stop Believing will tap into that exciting groundswell." The show was hosted by Emma Bunton, who told The Belfast Telegraph that she is a "huge fan" of Glee. The show's judges were former EastEnders actress Tamsin Outhwaite, Blue member Duncan James, singer Anastacia and High School Musical choreographer Charles "Chucky" Klapow.

=== The Glee Project ===
The Glee Project is a reality television series that serves as an audition for the main series. It ran for two seasons, each of which aired in the summers of 2011 and 2012. The winning prize was a seven-episode guest-starring role in Glee's third season, which was awarded to two contestants, Damian McGinty (Rory) and Samuel Larsen (Joe), with a two-episode role given to the two runner-ups, Alex Newell (Wade/Unique) and Lindsay Pearce (Harmony). The Glee Project was renewed for a second season that ran from June 5 to August 14, 2012. This season the winner was Blake Jenner (Ryder), with Ali Stroker (Betty) as runner-up.

=== Documentary films ===
On June 7, 2010, UK broadcaster Channel 4 aired Gleeful: The Real Show Choirs of America on its E4 station. The documentary explored the American show choir phenomenon which inspired Glee. Narrated by Nick Grimshaw, it went behind the scenes with real-life glee clubs and detailed celebrity show choir alumni including Lance Bass, Ashton Kutcher, Blake Lively and Anne Hathaway. It was selected as recommended viewing by The Guardian, with the comment: "it's a fascinating look at the real-life New Directions, and it's equally as crackers as its TV champion." The newspaper's Lucy Mangan reviewed the documentary positively, writing: "It will, one way or another, fill your heart to bursting", and commenting that: "Glee, it turns out, is not a gloriously ridiculous, highly polished piece of escapism. It is cinéma vérité." It was watched by 411,000 viewers, a 2.3% audience share.

A three-episode documentary miniseries about the deaths of three Glee main cast members – and claiming to investigate the effect of the sudden fame they experienced due to the show on their personal lives – called The Price of Glee, was produced in 2022, with people related to the series finding it in poor taste.

=== International remakes ===
A Vietnamese version named Glee Việt Nam aired on FPT Play, DANET, Zing TV in 2017.

== Discography ==
=== Albums ===
- Glee: The Music, Volume 1 (2009)
- Glee: The Music, Volume 2 (2009)
- Glee: The Music, Volume 3 Showstoppers (2010)
- Glee: The Music, The Christmas Album (2010)
- Glee: The Music, Volume 4 (2010)
- Glee: The Music, Volume 5 (2011)
- Glee: The Music Presents the Warblers (2011)
- Glee: The Music, Volume 6 (2011)
- Glee: The Music, The Christmas Album Volume 2 (2011)
- Glee: The Music, Volume 7 (2011)
- Glee: The Music, The Graduation Album (2012)
- Glee: The Music, Season 4, Volume 1 (2012)
- Glee: The Music, The Christmas Album Volume 3 (2012)
- Glee Sings the Beatles (2013)
- Glee: The Music – Celebrating 100 Episodes (2014)
