= Rumours (Glee) =

- Glee episode
- Episode no.: Season 2 Episode 19
- Directed by: Tim Hunter
- Written by: Ryan Murphy
- Production code: 2ARC19
- Original air date: May 3, 2011

Guest appearances
- Kristin Chenoweth as April Rhodes; Harry Shum, Jr. as Mike Chang; Chord Overstreet as Sam Evans; Ashley Fink as Lauren Zizes; Josh Sussman as Jacob Ben Israel; James Earl as Azimio; Cathy Doe as the barista; Ava Chelsea Ingram as Stacey Evans; Cody Hamilton as Stevie Evans; Lauren Potter as Becky Jackson

Episode chronology
← Previous "Born This Way"	Next → "Prom Queen"
- Glee season 2

"Rumours" is the nineteenth episode of the second season of the American musical television series Glee, and the forty-first overall. The episode was written by series co-creator Ryan Murphy, directed by Tim Hunter, first aired on May 3, 2011 on Fox in the United States, and it features the return of guest star Kristin Chenoweth. In "Rumours", the glee club is swept by rumors that strain the friendships and relationships of the members, so director Will Schuester (Matthew Morrison) has them perform songs from Fleetwood Mac's 1977 album Rumours. The episode is a tribute to that album, and all the songs covered in the episode are from it. This generated strong interest in the album: Rumours reentered the Billboard 200 chart at number eleven the week after the show was aired in the US, and the Australian album charts at number two five days after the show was aired in that country.

The episode received mixed reviews from critics. Amy Reiter of the Los Angeles Times wrote that "the episode had its moments that made lovin' Glee fun", but called the Sue Sylvester subplot "tired". Many critics were impressed with how well the album's music was incorporated into the episode including Erica Futterman of Rolling Stone, who wrote "the songs of Rumours fit the New Directions' drama in an organic way." The "Fondue for Two" segments were a favorite of reviewers, and were developed from an idea by one of the show's fans.

The musical performances received mostly praise, especially "Never Going Back Again" and "Go Your Own Way". Five of the six Rumours cover versions debuted on the Billboard Hot 100, and four of these were featured on the subsequent Glee: The Music, Volume 6 soundtrack album. Upon its initial airing, the "Rumours" episode was viewed by 8.85 million American viewers and garnered a 3.7/11 Nielsen rating/share in the 18–49 demographic. The total viewership and ratings for this episode was up slightly from the previous episode, "Born This Way".

== Plot ==
Cheerleading coach Sue Sylvester (Jane Lynch) revives the student newspaper The Muckraker. She wants to publish libel about the McKinley High glee club to cause conflict between the club's members and destroy it from within. Brittany's (Heather Morris) new internet talk show—"Fondue for Two"—gives the newspaper some grist when she seems to out Santana (Naya Rivera) on it. Santana berates Brittany for her ill-chosen words, and Finn (Cory Monteith) nearly comes to blows with Sam (Chord Overstreet) over another item that pairs Sam and Finn's girlfriend Quinn (Dianna Agron). Although Quinn and Sam both deny dating, Finn plans a stakeout with Rachel's help to see if it is true. Their surveillance of a shabby motel instead finds Sam and Kurt (Chris Colfer) leaving a room, after which Sam goes back inside alone.

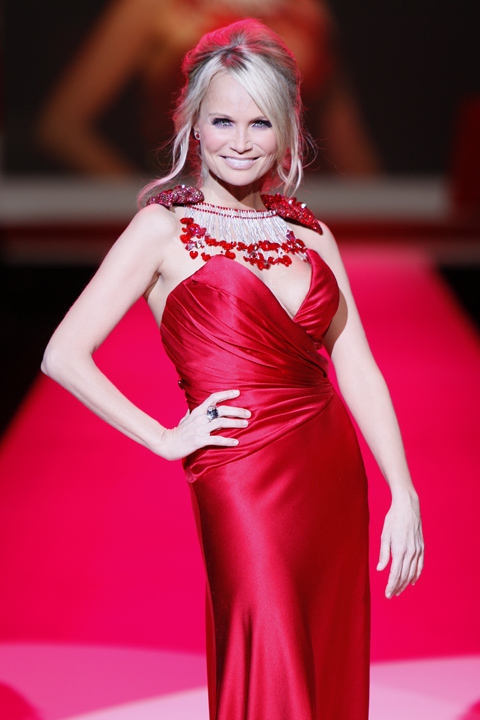
Kristin Chenoweth (pictured) makes her third appearance as April Rhodes

April Rhodes (Kristin Chenoweth) visits Will to ask for his help with her new Broadway project: a one-woman show entitled CrossRhodes. He tells her about the current glee club tensions, which she likens to Fleetwood Mac when they made their Rumours album. Will and April sing "Dreams" to the club, and he assigns them to perform songs from the album, to focus them back on music.

Artie Abrams (Kevin McHale) confronts Brittany: he becomes upset that Brittany cannot recognize that she is cheating on him with Santana, and calls her stupid. Brittany walks away in tears, stating that he was the only one who never called her that up until then, and he sings "Never Going Back Again". Santana further opens up to Brittany about her true feelings by singing "Songbird" to her. She agrees to go on Brittany's online talk show to let Brittany ask her to the prom, but she backs out at the last minute. Brittany later overhears Santana claim in an interview for The Muckraker that she is in love with Dave Karofsky (Max Adler), her running mate for prom king and queen.

Most of New Directions, minus Kurt and Sam, meet for coffee and speculate about the absent pair. Quinn maintains that Kurt would never cheat on his boyfriend Blaine (Darren Criss), and states that Sam is not gay. When Finn and Rachel resume their stakeout that night, they see Quinn leaving the same motel room, and Sam giving her a hug before going back inside.

The next day, the newspaper has an item about Finn and Rachel, who were spotted on their stakeout. Quinn is furious with Finn, and Finn is already mad about seeing Quinn with Sam. They confront each other, then sing a barbed version of the duet "I Don't Want to Know" as their glee club assignment. Quinn then gives an ultimatum: if Finn wants their relationship to continue, he cannot sing any more duets with Rachel. Rachel has other ideas, and later sings "Go Your Own Way" to Finn, who accompanies her on the drums. Some sharp accusations are thrown before Sam bitterly reveals that he was at the motel because his parents are unemployed and his family lives there now that their house has been foreclosed on—Kurt was bringing Sam some clothes, and Quinn was helping Sam babysit his younger brother and sister. Sam storms out. When the club discovers from Quinn that Sam has pawned his guitar, they buy it back for him and offer their support. Sam brings his siblings to a glee club rehearsal, and everyone sings "Don't Stop".

== Production ==
"We [Glee co-creators] have always wanted to do an episode that is a tribute not to a musical act but to an album. ... One of the albums that we all three love, that meant a lot to us: Rumours by Fleetwood Mac. ... We can get Stevie Nicks on the phone now, and we can get Lindsey Buckingham, who has kids, who's like, 'Oh my God, I'd love that', so twelve hours later you get the rights to Rumours."

— Ryan Murphy, PaleyFest 2011.

The show's co-creators Ryan Murphy, Brad Falchuk and Ian Brennan had long "wanted to do an episode" that would be a tribute to a single album rather than to a "musical act". Glee had covered "Landslide" by Stevie Nicks several weeks earlier in the episode "Sexy"; Nicks had visited the set to watch the song being filmed, and stayed for six hours. This relationship helped them obtain the rights to cover the songs on the 1977 Fleetwood Mac studio album from which the episode is named.

The idea for Brittany's "Fondue for Two" segments in the episode came from a Glee fan. Teresa Musumeci went to the 2010 Glee Live! In Concert! show at Radio City Music Hall in New York, and she had a letter delivered to Cory Monteith that mentioned she was writing her own internet program: "More like a Youtube show called 'Fondue for Two.'" According to wsvn.com, "Heather Morris who plays Brittany admits the idea came from a letter", and the show later sent Musumeci an autographed copy of the script and an autographed cast picture in thanks.

Chenoweth's reappearance marks her third time on the series as April. She last appeared in the season one episode "Home". Murphy explained the reason for her return as the failure of her attempt at an all-white musical production of The Wiz. Other recurring guest stars in the episode include glee club members Mike Chang (Harry Shum, Jr.), Sam Evans (Chord Overstreet), and Lauren Zizes (Ashley Fink), school bully Azimio (James Earl), school reporter Jacob Ben Israel (Josh Sussman), and cheerleader Becky Jackson (Lauren Potter). Additional guests include Sam's sister Stacey and brother Stevie, played by Ava Chelsea Ingram and Cody Hamilton respectively, a barista played by Cathy Doe, and a coffee shop patron played by Connie Ventress.

All six songs from Rumours covered in the episode were released as singles, available for digital download. Chenoweth and Morrison were featured on "Dreams", McHale sang "Never Going Back Again", Rivera covered "Songbird", Monteith and Agron duetted on "I Don't Want to Know", Michele sang "Go Your Own Way", and the glee club combined on "Don't Stop". The episode also included a portion of an original song, "Nice to Meet You, Have I Slept with You?"—written by Brennan and Adam Anders and sung by Chenoweth and Morrison—which was not released. "The Chain", also from Rumours, was used as backing music in the second motel stakeout scene.

== Reception ==
=== Ratings ===
"Rumours" was first broadcast on May 3, 2011 in the United States on Fox. It garnered a 3.7/11 Nielsen rating/share in the 18–49 demographic, and received 8.85 million American viewers during its initial airing. It was the third most-watched scripted show of the week among adults aged 18–49. The total viewership and ratings for this episode were slightly up from those of the previous episode, "Born This Way", which was watched by 8.62 million American viewers and acquired a 3.4/11 rating/share in the 18–49 demographic upon first airing.

The episode's Canadian broadcast, also on May 3, 2011, drew 1.49 million viewers and was the eighteenth most-watched program of the week. It dropped three places from the previous episode, which attained 82,000 more viewers. In Australia, "Rumours" was watched by 959,000 viewers, which made Glee the twelfth most-watched show of the night. The episode was the thirty-second most-watched program of the week, but ranked fifth in the 16–39 demographic. Viewership again increased from "Born This Way", which drew 805,000 viewers and ranked fourteenth on the night of broadcast. In the UK, the episode was watched by 2.50 million viewers—2.07 million on E4, and 432,000 on E4+1. It was the most-watched show on E4 and E4+1 for the week, and the second most-watched on cable. Here, viewership registered a slight decline on the previous episode, which attained 20,000 more viewers and ranked first on cable.

=== Critical response ===
"Rumours" was met with mixed to favorable reviews from the critics, though many of the latter listed significant caveats. Amy Reiter of the Los Angeles Times wrote that "the episode had its moments that made lovin' Glee fun". MTV's Aly Semigran said "It wasn't a perfect episode, but it was certainly an improvement over the last few". Lisa Respers France of CNN "had a whole ball of tissue" in her hand by the time the cast sang the "Don't Stop" finale, and concluded, "Well played, Glee."

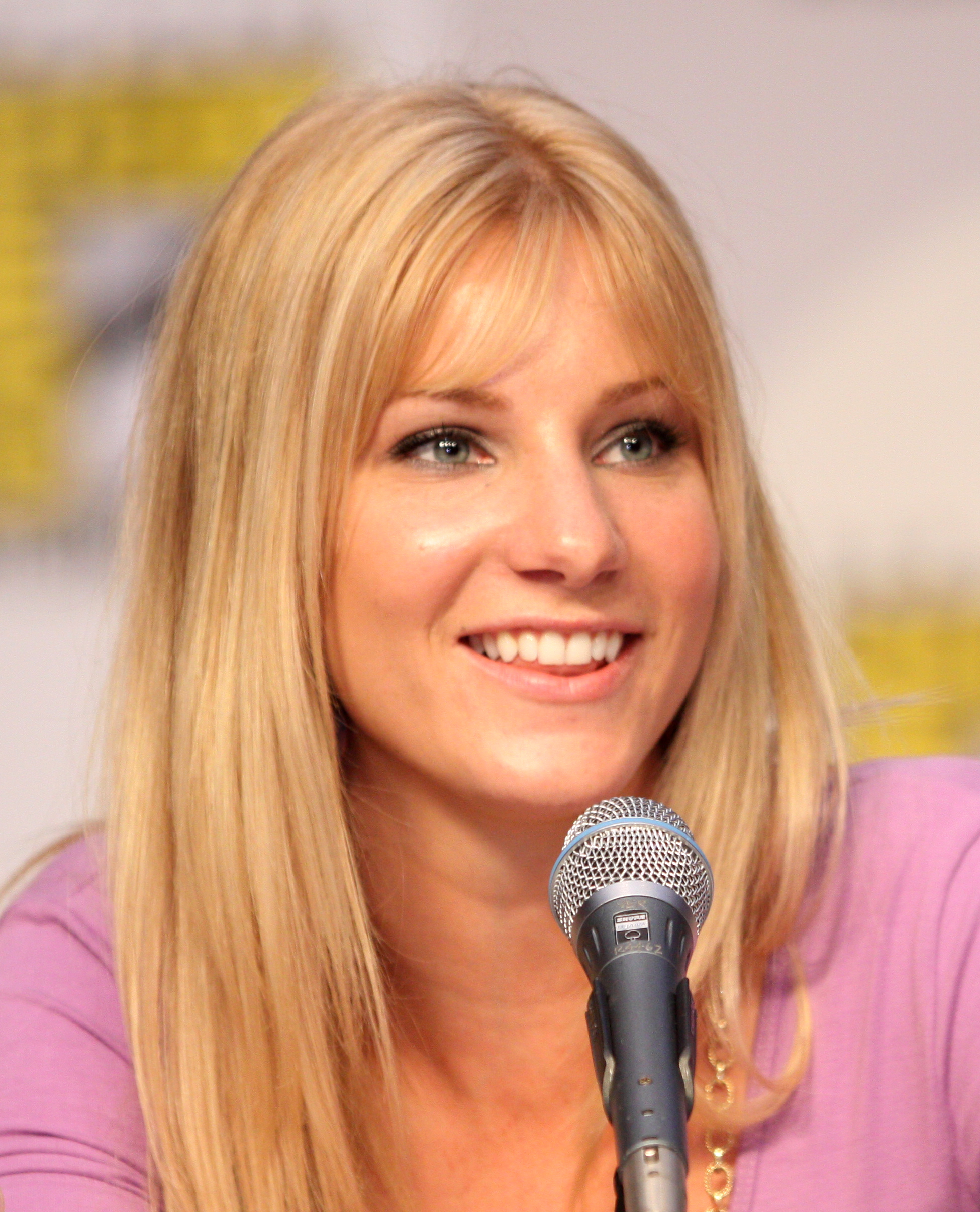
Brittany's (Morris, pictured) "Fondue for Two" segment was deemed an episode highlight

Time's James Poniewozik said "while 'Rumours' had its flaws ... the structure allowed the show to serve the stories, rather than feeling like the stories were there to service the songs", and particularly praised how "the songs were integrated into the drama". Semigran and Erica Futterman of Rolling Stone concurred with the latter point, and Futterman wrote that "despite a forced theme premise, the songs of Rumours fit the New Directions' drama in an organic way." The Atlantic's Kevin Fallon called the episode's focus on the Fleetwood Mac songs "a refreshing change of pace". Robert Canning of IGN liked the album concept, but felt it "didn't fully deliver". He gave "Rumours" a "good" rating of 7 out of 10, and wrote, "What made the episode at least mildly entertaining were the comedy bits. Brittany's 'Fondue For Two' segments were fantastic". Most other reviewers were similarly smitten with the "Fondue for Two" segments, including the aforementioned Reiter, Poniewozik, Semigran, and Respers France.

Futterman praised the return of Chenoweth's character April Rhodes, and The Wall Street Journal's Raymund Flandez said that she "brings such lightness, humor and zaniness that's endearingly button-nose cute". Fallon wrote, "Chenoweth's every sly smirk, eyebrow tick, and note sung—well, that was my week's highlight." Reiter was unenthusiastic: she acknowledged "Chenoweth's amazing pipes", but added "her character, which was thin to start with, has kind of worn out its welcome". The subplot of Will thinking about going to Broadway with April was roundly criticized: both Meghan Brown of The Atlantic and Bobby Hankinson of the Houston Chronicle said there was no tension at all because the viewer knows that he will stay. The A.V. Club's Zack Handlen called the entire scenario "ludicrous", made even more so by the highly compressed time frame, and their dress rehearsal "bizarre", criticisms echoed by Brown.

Sue's scenes were generally not well-liked. Although Canning wrote that the newspaper "delivered on the laughs", Entertainment Weekly's Sandra Gonzalez characterized the newspaper subplot was "neither important nor substantive" and was unimpressed with the "random, frightening costume changes", and Reiter said Sue's storyline was one that "felt as tired as secondhand news". Poniewozik said that the episode "recognized that she is not really a character but a human obstacle", which he suggested was "a better way for the show to use her".

According to Hankinson, "One of the best parts of the episode centered around Brittany and Santana, but I think all the principals—Artie, Finn, Rachel, and Quinn too—did a great job portraying the tension and distrust pervading the team." Anthony Benigno of The Faster Times felt the show was "absurdly preachy" on the matter of rumors, though he said the episode was "decent". The scene in the motel room with Sam, Rachel, Finn and Sam's brother and sister was called "arguably the most affecting scene of the entire episode" by Handlen, and Poniewozik wrote that "Chord Overstreet sold Sam's feeling of loss". Canning felt otherwise: "It may have had a better impact if we cared more about Sam or if Chord Overstreet had delivered more believable tears, but as things were, it was just some ordinary, blah drama."

The developments in the relationship between Brittany and Santana received considerable attention. John Kubicek of BuddyTV thought the plot was pointless, and said it "boiled down to: I'm not ready to come out. I'm ready. Now I'm not again." He added, "If you're going to have Santana question herself, at least show it and don't have it all happen off screen." Both Hankinson and Respers France were impressed by the acting of both Morris and Rivera. Hankinson wrote, "It feels like their relationship is developing organically", while Respers France commended Morris for Brittany's breakup scene with Artie, and Rivera for far surpassing her expectations.

=== Music and performances ===
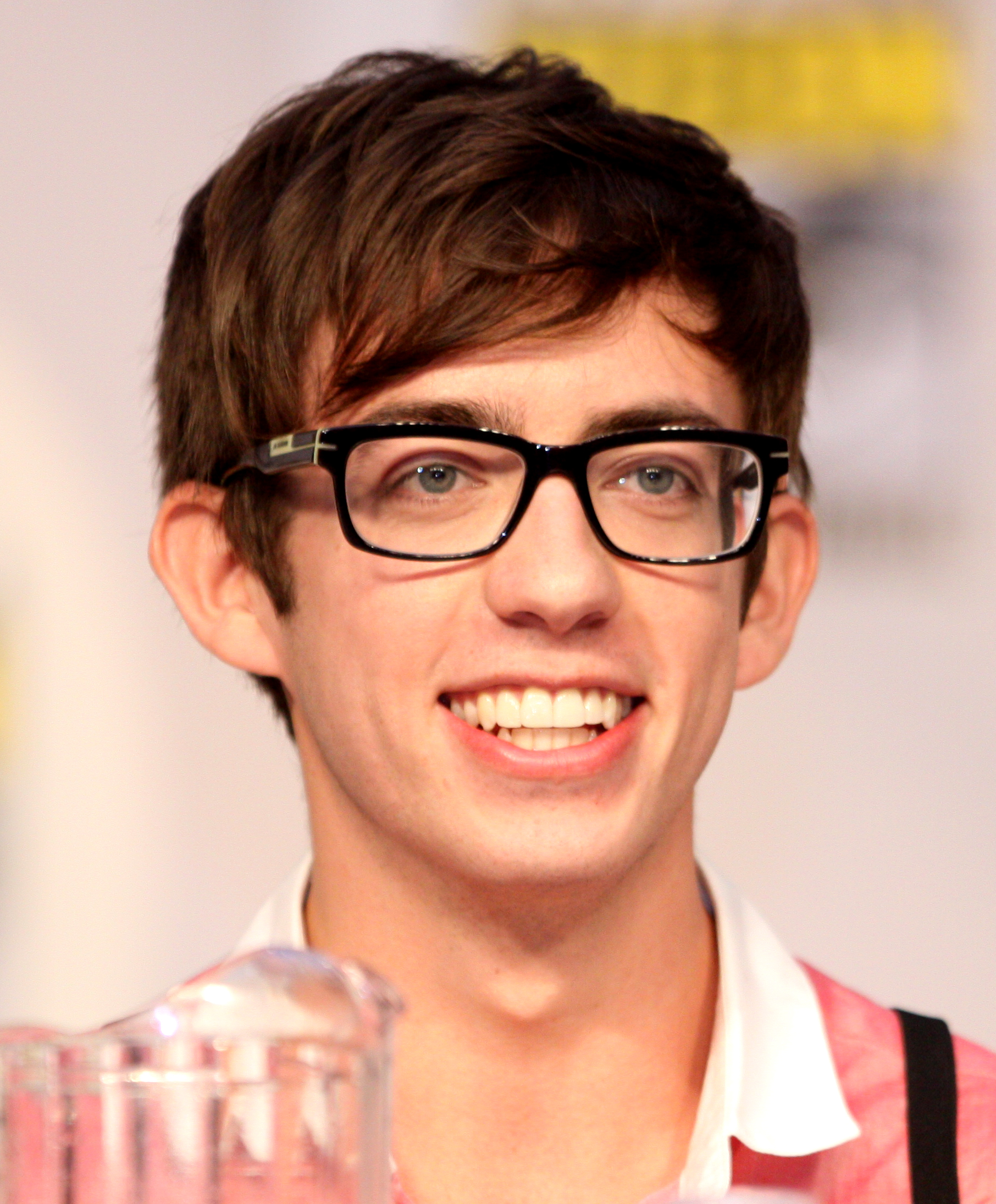
Reviewers hailed Artie's (McHale, pictured) performance of "Never Going Back Again"

All of the musical numbers were generally praised, though not every number was received with the same enthusiasm. Benigno was disappointed that there was "nothing special" in any of the arrangements, but Futterman saw the performances from a different perspective: "They're not as visually stunning, but they're vocally some of the more impressive renditions Glee has done all season." She said of the "Dreams" rendition by Chenoweth with Morrison, "The harmonies and bare-bones arrangement make for one of Glee's most faithful covers yet." Most critics welcomed the Chenoweth version. Gonzalez gave the song a "B+" and Brett Berk of Vanity Fair awarded it four stars of five; both praised Chenoweth but criticized Morrison. Semigran and Kubicek simply gave kudos to Chenoweth alone. Benigno wondered why the pair were trying to imitate Nicks and Lindsey Buckingham when he felt they were better singers than those two, and gave the song a "B".

Hankinson wrote, "I enjoyed all the smaller numbers tonight because I felt like the kids really sold the performances and infused some nice emotional context." Of these, "Never Going Back Again" received the most consistent approval. Futterman said it was "better than Artie's post-Tina 'Stronger'", and Kubicek declared it "proof that he's quite good at hitting emotional notes", while Semigran said she was "blown away". Both Gonzalez and Benigno gave it an "A−", while Berk gave it all five stars. Berk also gave five stars to "Songbird", which Gonzalez again gave an "A−", while Benigno was slightly less generous with a "B+". Futterman described Santana's vocals as "raw and restrained", and called her rendition of the song a "heartbreaking performance", but while Semigran called it "sweet enough", she also wrote "Rivera's voice doesn't pack quite the punch the tune requires". Kubicek, however, said it was "easily the best song from the episode".

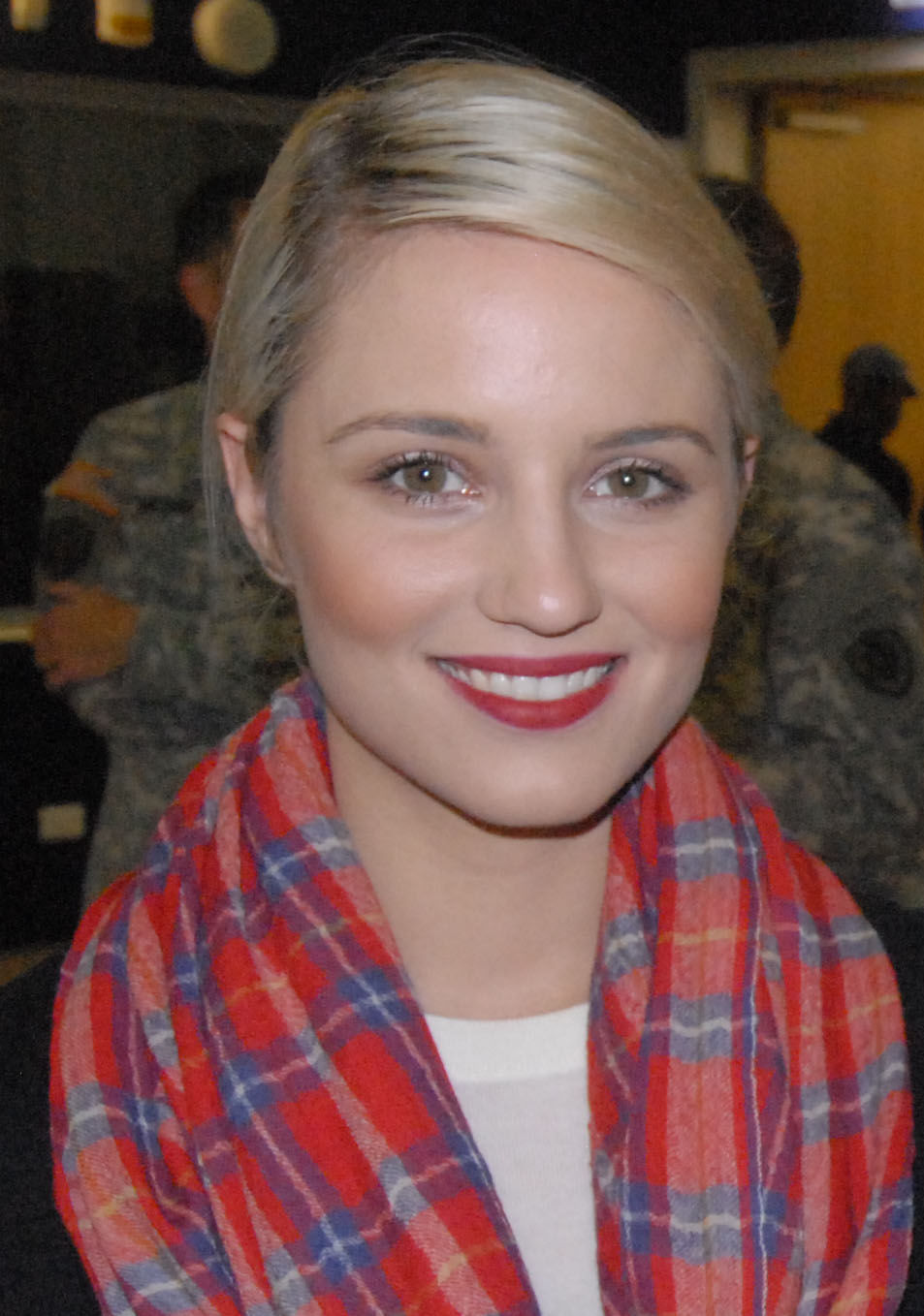
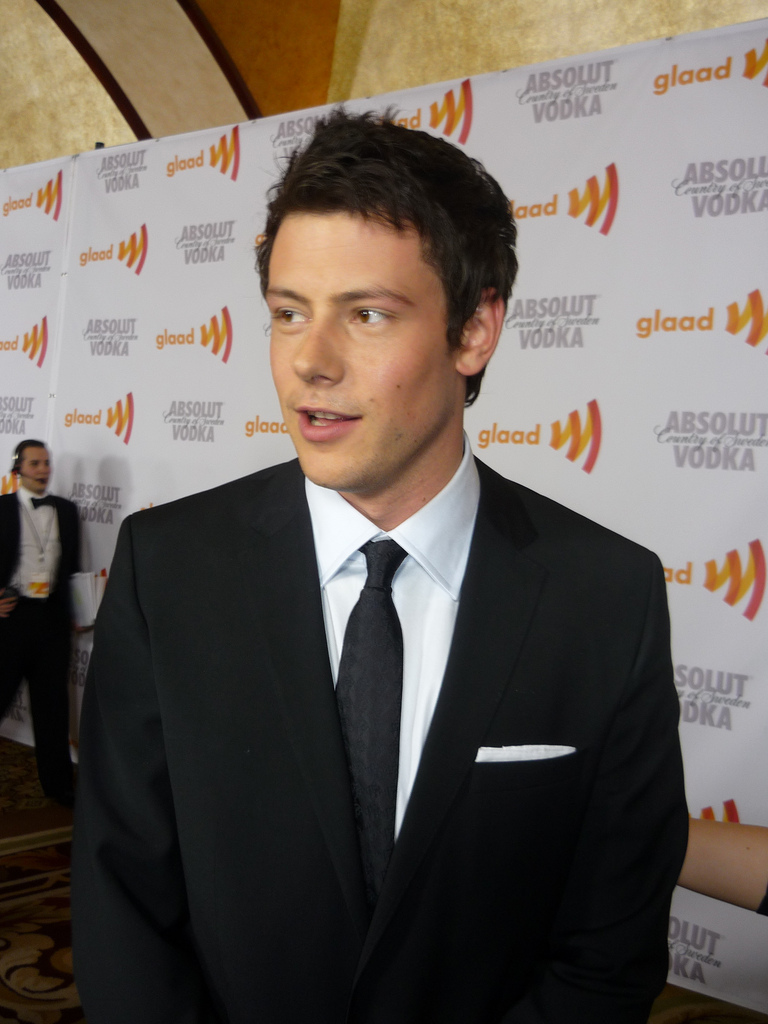
The first full-length vocal duet between Quinn (Agron, left) and Finn (Monteith, right) is featured in this episode, and drew praise from many reviewers

Many reviewers appreciated the pointed "I Don't Want to Know" performance. Kubicek called it "quite entertaining", Gonzalez felt the "angry singing" was "hot" and gave it an "A−", the same grade as Benigno, who said the song had "a bit more oomph than the original", though he added that Finn "sings with the subtlety of an artillery barrage" and he was happy with Quinn's "strong foundation in the back". Futterman wrote that it was "better than Quinn and Sam's 'Lucky'", but Berk gave the song only two stars out of five, the same grade he gave to "Go Your Own Way". Although both Kubicek and Gonzalez criticized Rachel's motivations in singing the song, the latter still gave it an "A" and noted "if I had to listen to someone cover this song, it'd be her". Semigran called it "one of Lea Michele's strongest outings all season", while Benigno said "this is one of those rare times her balls-to-the-walls delivery works with the arrangement instead of distracting from it" and gave it an "A". Hankinson was "particularly fond" of the song, and added that it had "great energy".

The group finale of "Don't Stop" received good grades—"A" from Gonzales and "B+" from Benigno, and four of five stars from Berk. Kubicek found a bright spot in that Sam got to sing a solo. The performance received encomiums such as "pretty great" from Semigran and "inspired" from Futterman. The portion of an original song for the April Rhodes musical sung by April and Will, "Nice to Meet You, Have I Slept with You?", received little commentary, though Flandez made specific mention of "her operatic range, and their charismatic stage presence".

=== Chart history ===
Five of the six Rumours cover versions debuted on the Billboard Hot 100: "Go Your Own Way" debuted at number forty-five, "Songbird" at number sixty-eight, "Don't Stop" at number seventy-nine, "Never Going Back Again" at number eighty-one, and "Dreams" at number ninety-two. The sixth, "I Don't Want to Know", did not chart. The first four Glee songs on the Hot 100 also charted on the Billboard Canadian Hot 100: "Go Your Own Way" debuted at number thirty-one, "Don't Stop" at number sixty-five, "Songbird" at number seventy, and "Never Going Back Again" at number eighty. The peak positions attained by "Songbird" and "Go Your Own Way" were fifty-four and thirty, in the UK and Australia respectively. Out of the six songs from Rumours that were featured in the episode, four were also featured on the eighth soundtrack album of the series, Glee: The Music, Volume 6: "Songbird", "Don't Stop", "Go Your Own Way", and "Dreams".

The episode also sparked renewed interest in Fleetwood Mac and its most commercially successful album, and Rumours reentered the Billboard 200 chart at number eleven, the same week that Nicks' new solo album In Your Dreams debuted at number six. The two recordings sold a little less than 30,000 and 52,000 units, respectively. Music downloads accounted for ninety-one percent of the Rumours sales. The spike in sales for Rumours represented an uptick of 1,951%, and it had the highest US chart entry by a previously issued album since The Rolling Stones' reissue of Exile on Main St. entered the chart at number two on June 5, 2010. In Australia, the interest had an even more profound effect: five days after the episode aired, the Rumours album entered the Australian charts at number two, and was at number three the following week. Most sales came from digital downloads. In all, the album was in the top forty for nine consecutive weeks. Rumours received its 13× Platinum certification in Australia at the end of May 2011.
