= Matthew Hodgson (writer) =

American television writer (born 1982)

- Born: 1982 (age 43–44); United States
- Education: Ithaca College
- Occupations: Television writer; producer

Matthew Hodgson is an American television writer and producer known for such television series as Glee and The Beauty.

== Early life and career ==
Hodgson was born in 1982 and was raised in Stow, Massachusetts. He graduated from Ithaca College.

In 2006, he moved to Los Angeles and launched his Hollywood career working as a production assistant for the television series Nip/Tuck. Hodgson later became writer and producer Ryan Murphy's assistant. He then worked his way up as a writer for Glee season three after being script coordinator on the series.

Hodgson went on to write for television series like 9-1-1, American Sports Story and The Beauty.

== Personal life ==
In 2012, Glee star Naya Rivera described Hodgson as her "best friend."

It was eventually revealed that Rivera and Hodgson were in fact dating.
