= Dream On (Glee) =

- Glee episode
- Episode no.: Season 1 Episode 19
- Directed by: Joss Whedon
- Written by: Brad Falchuk
- Production code: 1ARC18
- Original air date: May 18, 2010

Guest appearances
- Neil Patrick Harris as Bryan Ryan; Jonathan Groff as Jesse St. James; Idina Menzel as Shelby Corcoran; Molly Shannon as Brenda Castle; John Michael Higgins as Russell; Iqbal Theba as Principal Figgins; Naya Rivera as Santana Lopez; Paul C. Vogt as Herb Duncan; Heather Morris as Brittany Pierce; Harry Shum, Jr. as Mike Chang; Dijon Talton as Matt Rutherford

Episode chronology
← Previous "Laryngitis"	Next → "Theatricality"
- Glee season 1

"Dream On" is the nineteenth episode of the American television series Glee. The episode premiered on the Fox network on May 18, 2010. It was directed by Joss Whedon and written by series creator Brad Falchuk. Neil Patrick Harris guest-stars as former glee club star Bryan Ryan. Working as a school board auditor, he threatens to cut the glee club out of the budget, bitter at never having attained his own show-business dreams. Rachel (Lea Michele) attempts to find her birth mother, and Artie (Kevin McHale) struggles with his desire to walk. The episode title is a reference to Aerosmith's song "Dream On", also performed during the episode.

The episode features cover versions of seven songs, four of which were released as singles, available for digital download, and three of which are included on the soundtrack album Glee: The Music, Volume 3 Showstoppers. "Dream On" was watched by 11.59 million American viewers and received generally positive reviews from critics. Maureen Ryan of the Chicago Tribune, Bobby Hankinson of the Houston Chronicle, Gerrick. D Kennedy of the Los Angeles Times and Emily VanDerWerff of The A.V. Club all deemed it one of the best episodes of the season, while Aly Semigran of MTV, Entertainment Weekly's Tim Stack and Raymund Flandez of The Wall Street Journal praised the musical performances. Blair Baldwin of Zap2it in contrast felt that the songs were inconsistent, and while Harris' appearance was generally well received, Eric Goldman of IGN felt that his storyline was lacking in impact.

== Plot ==
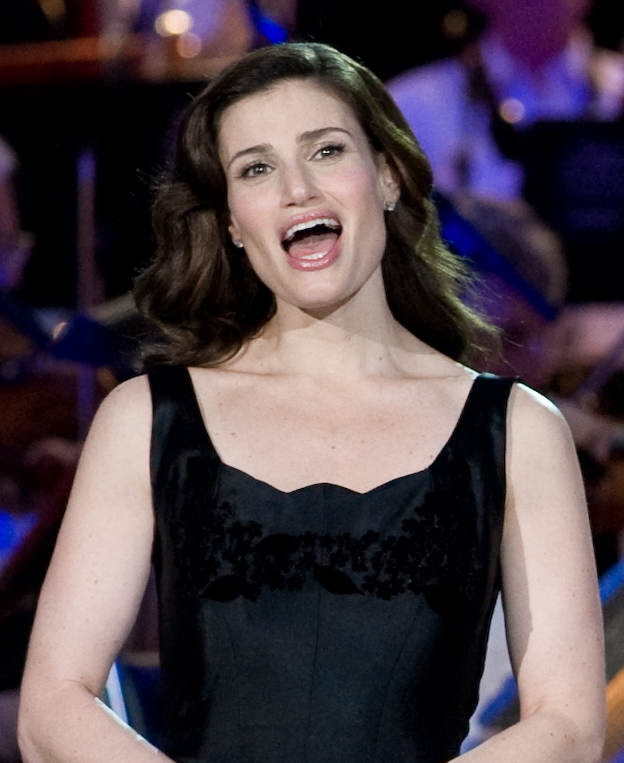
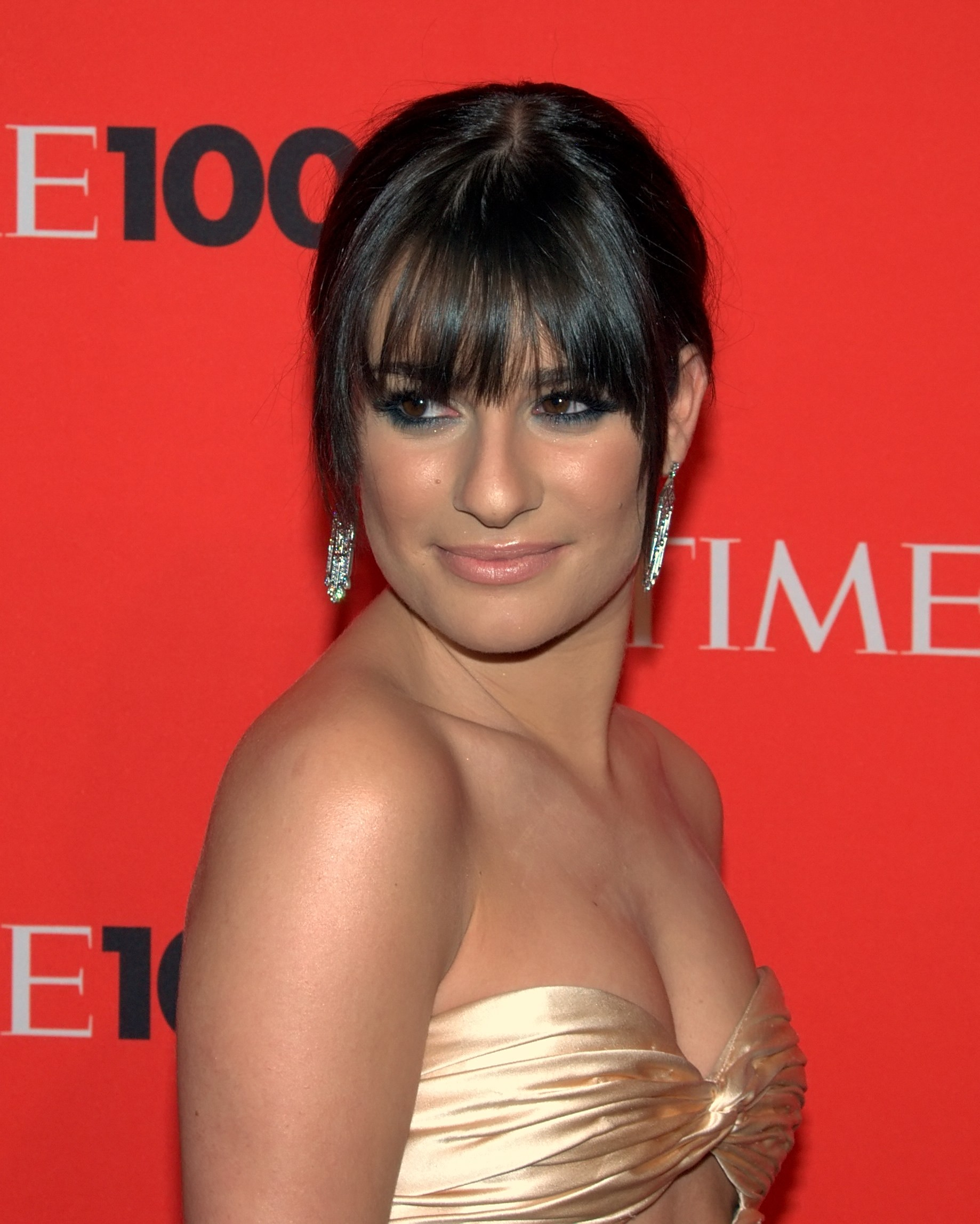
Idina Menzel (left) was cast in Glee following a fan campaign based on her resemblance to Lea Michele (right). Her character, Shelby, is revealed to be Rachel's mother in this episode.

Bryan Ryan (Neil Patrick Harris), a former McKinley High glee club member, arrives as an auditor from the school board. He speaks to the glee club, asking everyone to write their biggest dream on a piece of paper. He then takes Artie's (Kevin McHale) paper and tosses it into the trash, making a point that their dreams will never come true. Having failed to realize his own dreams, he intends to cut the glee club. Glee club director Will Schuester (Matthew Morrison) convinces him that it is not too late to pursue his dreams and sings "Piano Man" with him. They both audition for the role of Jean Valjean in the local production of Les Misérables, singing "Dream On" as a duet. Bryan decides not to cut the glee club, and even presents them with new costumes and sheet music, but changes his mind when cheerleading coach Sue Sylvester (Jane Lynch) announces that Will landed the lead role. Will gives up his role in Les Misérables to Bryan in order to save the glee club.

Rachel (Lea Michele) confides in Jesse (Jonathan Groff) of her lifelong dream to discover the identity of her mother. While they are searching through boxes of records from her basement, Jesse takes a cassette tape from his jacket and pretends that it came from the box. The tape is labeled as a message from mother to daughter. Rachel refuses to listen to the tape, stating that she is not ready. Jesse later meets with Shelby Corcoran (Idina Menzel), the coach of Vocal Adrenaline, who reveals that she is Rachel's biological mother, but a contractual agreement with Rachel's two fathers prevents her from meeting with her until she is 18. Jesse reveals that though he had "befriended" Rachel just to get more acting practice, he had actually started liking her. She implores Jesse to convince Rachel to listen to the tape. Back at Rachel's house, Jesse starts the tape playing as Rachel enters her bedroom, then leaves her to listen to it. On the tape, Shelby sings "I Dreamed a Dream", leading to a duet with Rachel in a dream sequence, ending with Rachel back in her room in tears.

Artie Abrams dancing with the song "The Safety Dance."

After Bryan's discouraging speech, Tina (Jenna Ushkowitz) retrieves Artie's paper from the trash and learns that his biggest dream is to become a dancer. Tina would like to dance with Artie, but he falls off his crutches when he tries to stand up from his wheelchair. Tina comforts Artie by showing him some of the latest research in spinal cord injury treatments. While waiting for Tina to buy pretzels at the mall, Artie fantasizes about being able to stand up from his wheelchair and dances to "The Safety Dance" in a flash mob dream sequence. He later asks guidance counsellor Emma Pillsbury (Jayma Mays) for advice on how to cope with the possibility of walking again in light of the new research, but is disappointed when Emma tells him that such treatments may not become available for a long time. Tina continues to offer to dance with him but he declines, insisting that she choose another partner but agreeing to sing during the dance. Tina chooses Mike (Harry Shum, Jr.) as her dance partner as Artie leads the glee club into "Dream a Little Dream of Me".

== Production ==
"Dream On" was filmed in March 2010. In October 2009, Michael Ausiello of Entertainment Weekly reported that 20th Century Fox, the studio behind Glee, had approached Joss Whedon about directing an episode during the show's first season. Series creator Ryan Murphy is a fan of Whedon's work, and praised the musical episode of his series Buffy the Vampire Slayer, commenting: "Joss directed one of the great musical episodes in the history of television on Buffy, so this is a great, if unexpected, fit. I'm thrilled he'll be loaning us his fantastic groundbreaking talent." Whedon deemed Glee his favorite television show, but downplayed his influence over the episode. Asked by Ileane Rudolph of TV Guide whether the episode would feature songs from Buffy, or his 2008 musical Dr. Horrible's Sing-Along Blog, Whedon replied: "I would have to say a resonant 'no way.' The episode isn't about me. It's the next episode of Glee. Hopefully my hands will be invisible on the show." Whedon felt that his job was to be anonymous: "to find the most compelling way to present a story without calling attention to himself." He acknowledged his proclivity for killing off fans' favorite characters, jesting that he planned to murder Principal Figgins (Iqbal Theba).

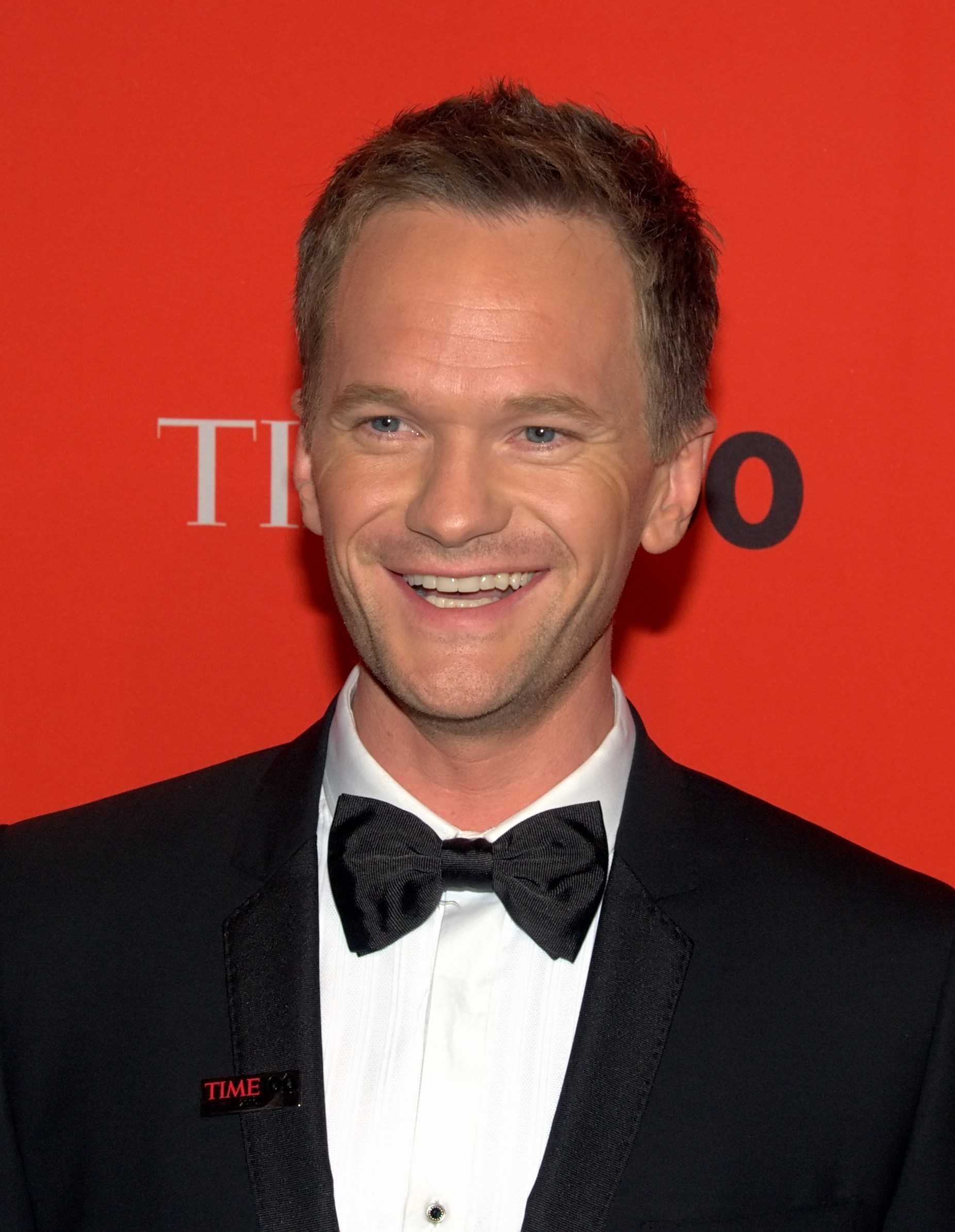
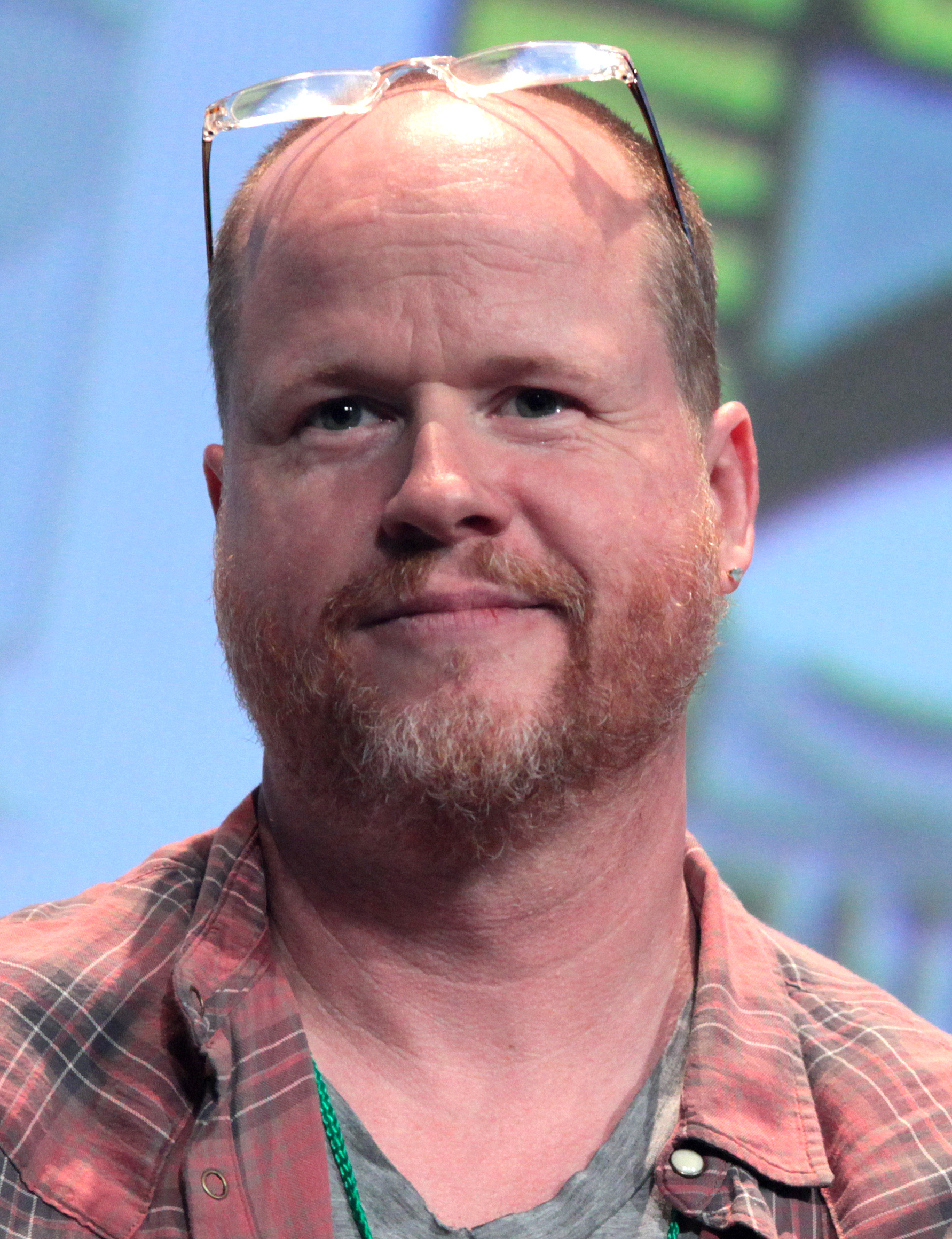
Neil Patrick Harris (left) guest-stars in "Dream On", directed by his Dr. Horrible colleague Joss Whedon (right).

Whedon feels the episode's title is pertinent to the storylines, explaining that the aim was to examine the desires at the core of the central characters, including Will's desire to perform, Rachel's desire to find her biological mother and Artie's desire to walk again. He stated: "I was really lucky because there's a real phonetic coherence of the episode that brought them all together on an emotional level. For me, it was just a question that they dovetailed and didn't feel random and you understood why these three stories were all in the same show."

Kristin Dos Santos of E! Online commented on Whedon's tendency to work repeatedly with the same actors, and hoped that Dr. Horrible star Neil Patrick Harris might appear in the episode. Four months later, in February 2010, Dos Santos reported that Harris had signed a contract to appear on Glee. Murphy created a role especially for the actor, who received clearance from CBS to appear on Fox for the episode. Ausiello reported that Harris would play Bryan Ryan, a former high school rival of glee club director Will Schuester (Matthew Morrison), now a member of the Lima school board, intent on revenge for never having fulfilled his own potential by cutting the school arts program. Morrison stated that Harris' character is two years older than Will, and "got all the girls and the good songs" during their high school days.

Recurring characters who appear in "Dream On" are glee club members Santana Lopez (Naya Rivera), Brittany Pierce (Heather Morris), Mike Chang (Harry Shum, Jr.), Matt Rutherford (Dijon Talton) and Jesse St. James (Jonathan Groff), astronomy teacher Brenda Castle (Molly Shannon, appearing alongside her Kath & Kim co-star, John Michael Higgins), and Vocal Adrenaline coach Shelby Corcoran (Idina Menzel). The episode features cover versions of seven songs. Will and Bryan duet on "Dream On" by Aerosmith, and "Piano Man" by Billy Joel. Bryan also sings "Daydream Believer" by The Monkees, and a Les Misérables auditionee played by Wendy Worthington sings "Big Spender" from Sweet Charity. Artie performs "The Safety Dance" by Men Without Hats and "Dream a Little Dream of Me" by The Mamas & the Papas, and Shelby and Rachel sing "I Dreamed a Dream" from Les Misérables. Each of the songs except "Piano Man", "Big Spender" and "Daydream Believer" were released as singles, available for digital download, and "Dream On", "The Safety Dance" and "I Dreamed a Dream" are also included on the soundtrack album Glee: The Music, Volume 3 – Showstoppers. "I Dreamed a Dream" charted at number 36 on the Irish Singles Chart.

== Reception ==
=== Ratings ===
In its original broadcast, "Dream On" was watched by 11.59 million American viewers and attained a 4.8/12 rating/share in the 18–49 demographic. In the United Kingdom, the episode was watched by 1.54 million viewers and was the most-watched show of the week on the non-terrestrial channels. In Canada, it was watched by 1.86 million viewers, making Glee the tenth most-viewed show of the week. In Australia, Glee drew its highest-ever overnight audience with 1.30 million viewers, and won its timeslot in all key demographics. Its consolidated ratings were adjusted up to 1.56 million, making "Dream On" the eleventh most-viewed program of the week.

=== Critical response ===
The episode received generally positive reviews from critics. Maureen Ryan of the Chicago Tribune deemed "Dream On" a "highly enjoyable", "emotionally satisfying" episode, and possibly her favorite since the pilot. Ryan praised Whedon's directing, writing that it is clear "Whedon really gets what this show is good at when it's working". Lee Ferguson of CBC also called "Dream On" one of his favorite episodes of the season, commenting that: "NPH easily outperformed some of the other recent celebs (including Molly Shannon and Olivia Newton-John) who've stopped by the show", and hoped that his character would return in the future.

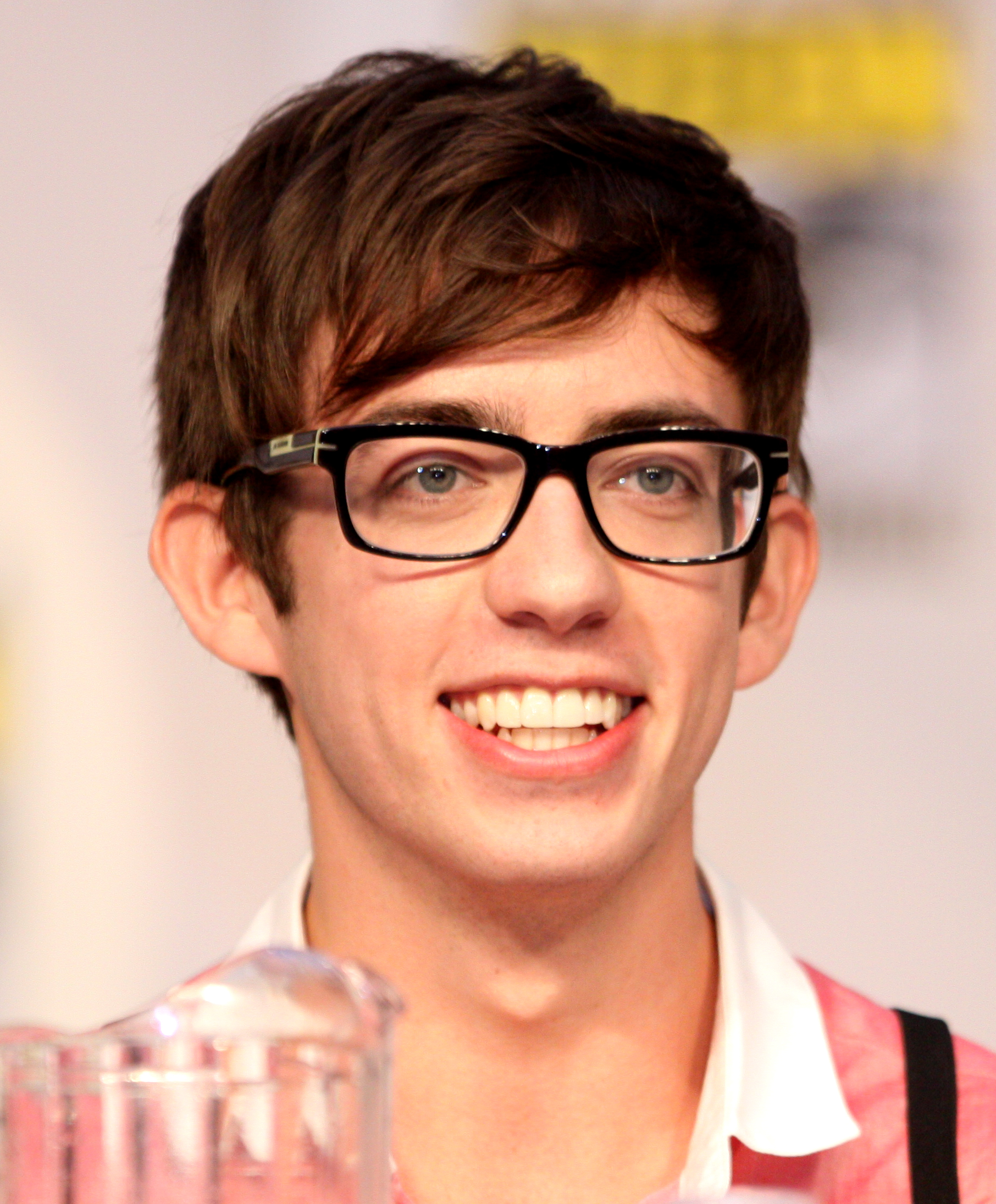
McHale's songs in "Dream On" attracted praise from critics.

CNN's Lisa Respers France praised both the Artie and Rachel storylines, and wrote that: "Harris' Bryan Ryan character had it all: timing, great singing and a crazy chemistry with Jane Lynch's character, Sue Sylvester." James Poniewozik of Time deemed the episode "exceptional in ways that went beyond guest appearances", noting: "it was not just good compared with recent episodes, but entertaining, arresting and moving in an unqualified sense." Bobby Hankinson of the Houston Chronicle called "Dream On": "one of the best episodes in one of the greatest freshman seasons in recent history", while Gerrick D. Kennedy of the Los Angeles Times similarly deemed the episode one of the best of "an already stellar freshman season", and Emily VanDerWerff of The A.V. Club graded the episode "A" and called it "one of the two or three best Glee episodes ever. Hell, it might be THE best."

Aly Semigran of MTV reviewed the episode's musical performances positively, calling "Piano Man" the series' "most realistic musical number" and writing that "nothing even came close to the amount of awesome" that was the "Dream On" duet. Semigran noted that McHale's songs "proved he was a force to be reckoned with", and called the "I Dreamed a Dream" duet "goosebump-inducing", observing: "Pretty sure that's what musical theater lovers' dreams are made of." Raymund Flandez of The Wall Street Journal called Michele and Menzel's number "one of the most touching duets in the show so far", stating: "the vulnerability they both convey is stunning in its simplicity and perfection." Entertainment Weekly's Tim Stack wrote that the "Piano Man" duet was so good he wished it had been released for download. He rated the songs performed "B+" through to "A" and called "Safety Dance" one of his favorite moments of the episode, deeming it a "joyous, huge performance—definitely one of the most elaborate numbers the show has done before."

Blair Baldwin of Zap2it wrote that while the "Dream On" performance began perfectly, Harris "killed the song" with an "ear-wrenching" lead-in to the chorus. Baldwin also highlighted synchronization problems with the "Safety Dance" choreography, and wrote that Shum's dancing to "Dream a Little Dream" was "terrible" and "sloppy". Baldwin did enjoy the "I Dreamed a Dream" performance, and hoped for greater consistency in the future. Eric Goldman of IGN rated the episode 7.7/10, writing that while he had expected the episode to be "freaking awesome", instead it was merely "okay". He felt that the musical numbers "failed to really resonate", and called Harris' character "amusing in theory" but ultimately "one-note" and lacking in impact, with a storyline that "fizzled out". In December 2012, TV Guide named the "Safety Dance" rendition one of Glee's best performances.

In August 2010, the 62nd Primetime Creative Emmys awarded Harris an Emmy (out of two total) in the 'Best Guest Actor in a Comedy Series' category for his "Dream On" appearance and performance.
