= Wheels (Glee) =

- Glee episode
- Episode no.: Season 1 Episode 9
- Directed by: Paris Barclay
- Written by: Ryan Murphy
- Production code: 1ARC08
- Original air date: November 11, 2009

Guest appearances
- Stephen Tobolowsky as Sandy Ryerson; Iqbal Theba as Principal Figgins; Mike O'Malley as Burt Hummel; Naya Rivera as Santana Lopez; Heather Morris as Brittany Pierce; Harry Shum Jr. as Mike Chang; Dijon Talton as Matt Rutherford; Josh Sussman as Jacob Ben Israel; Cheryl Francis Harrington as the residential facility nurse; Lauren Potter as Becky Jackson; Robin Trocki as Jean Sylvester; Ashley Fink as Lauren Zizes

Episode chronology
← Previous "Mash-Up"	Next → "Ballad"
- Glee season 1

"Wheels" is the ninth episode of the American television series Glee. Written by series co-creator Ryan Murphy and directed by Paris Barclay, the episode premiered on the Fox network on November 11, 2009. "Wheels" sees the glee club hold a bake sale to raise money for a handicap accessible bus, so that club member Artie (Kevin McHale) can travel with them to sectionals and Will (Matthew Morrison) challenges the students to experience life from a different point of view. Quinn (Dianna Agron) struggles with the medical expenses incurred by her pregnancy, and Puck (Mark Salling) renews his offer to support her. Sue (Jane Lynch) accepts a student with Down syndrome (Lauren Potter) onto the cheerleading squad, and Kurt (Chris Colfer) and Rachel (Lea Michele) compete for a solo performance.

McHale called "Wheels" the "most serious" episode of Glee so far, while Murphy deemed it "the turning point for the show". The episode introduces two new characters, Lauren Potter as Becky Jackson and Robin Trocki as Jean Sylvester. It features covers of Nouvelle Vague's rendition of "Dancing with Myself", "Defying Gravity" from Wicked and Ike & Tina Turner's rendition of "Proud Mary". "Dancing With Myself" is McHale's first solo performance on the show. "Defying Gravity" was included as a reflection of Colfer's own high school experience, which saw his drama teacher refuse to allow him to sing the song because of his sex. "Proud Mary" is staged entirely in wheelchairs, and was described by series choreographer Zach Woodlee as the "scariest" number produced to date.

"Wheels" was watched by 7.35 million US viewers, and saw Barclay nominated for the Directors Guild of America Award for Outstanding Directing of a Comedy Series. It prompted criticism from a committee of performers with disabilities, who felt that it was inappropriate to cast a non-disabled actor in a disabled role. The episode received generally positive reviews from critics, with Entertainment Weekly's Tim Stack and Aly Semigran of MTV both writing that it brought them to tears. Reviewers Alan Sepinwall of The Star-Ledger and Maureen Ryan of the Chicago Tribune both commented positively on the episode, despite formerly having given unfavorable reviews of the series as a whole. In contrast, The New York Times's Mike Hale deemed the episode problematic, and Eric Goldman of IGN described it as "very afterschool special".

== Plot ==
Glee club director Will Schuester is informed that the school budget will not cover a handicap-accessible bus to transport the glee club to sectionals, which means that Artie Abrams (Kevin McHale) will have to travel separately from the rest of the club. Will encourages the other club members to support Artie, not only by holding a bake sale to raise funds for a handicap bus, but also by spending time in wheelchairs to experience what life is like for him. Meanwhile, Quinn Fabray (Dianna Agron) is struggling to cover the medical expenses of her pregnancy, and threatens to break up with Finn Hudson (Cory Monteith) if he cannot pay her ultrasound bill. Puck (Mark Salling) fights with Finn, whom he feels is not doing enough to support Quinn. By including cannabis in the cupcakes, Puck ensures the bake sale is a success and offers Quinn the money raised. She apologizes for previously calling him a loser, but refuses to accept the money, and is relieved when Finn is able to find a job.

Rachel Berry (Lea Michele) and Kurt Hummel (Chris Colfer) compete for a solo on "Defying Gravity". The part, normally performed by a female, is initially offered to Rachel, but when Kurt's father Burt (Mike O'Malley) complains to Principal Figgins (Iqbal Theba) that his son is being discriminated against, Kurt is allowed to audition along with Rachel. Burt receives an anonymous abusive phone call about his son's sexual orientation, and Kurt deliberately sabotages his own audition to spare his father further harassment.

Artie reveals the origin of his disability to Tina Cohen-Chang (Jenna Ushkowitz), explaining that he was paralyzed in a car accident at the age of eight. He likens his wheelchair use to Tina's speech impediment. The two go on a date and kiss, but part on bad terms when Tina confesses that she has been faking her speech impediment since the sixth grade, in order to deflect attention from herself, but now feels she no longer needs to, having been given confidence by the glee club.

Having previously removed Quinn from the cheerleading squad due to her pregnancy, coach Sue Sylvester is forced to hold open auditions to find a replacement. She accepts Becky Jackson (Lauren Potter), a sophomore with Down syndrome. Will is suspicious of her motives, increasingly so when Sue donates money to the school to fund three new handicap ramps for students with disabilities. Sue is later seen visiting her older sister, Jean (Robin Trocki), who also has Down syndrome, and lives in a residential home for people with disabilities. In the end, the glee club performs "Proud Mary", staging the entire routine in wheelchairs in support of Artie.

== Production ==
Kevin McHale deemed "Wheels" the "most serious" episode of Glee so far. Of the burgeoning romance between Artie and Tina, McHale opined: "I think Tina and Artie will be together. I think they will be a couple for a long time." McHale and Ushkowitz hoped that their characters would ultimately become a couple, as they are best friends in real life.

"As we go forward, this episode has reverberations for the whole season. This is a comedy first and foremost. But we see the obligation to go deeper. This isn't just a genre show to me. It's about the desperate need for a place in the world and how we all fit in and how hard it is for some people to get by."

— Murphy, on his hopes for the episode and its ultimate impact on the series.

Murphy called "Wheels" "the turning point for the show". He elaborated: "Certainly, after this, it remains a comedy, and it's fun. But writing this made me feel the responsibility of showing the truth of the pain that outcasts go through. It's not all razzle-dazzle show business. It's tough, and it's painful, and it was for me growing up, and it is for most people." Murphy commented that the episode caused him to realize that, as well as highlighting the "fun and glamour" of glee clubs, it is also occasionally "really great [...] to show the underbelly of what people who are different feel."

Recurring characters who appear in the episode are Kurt's father Burt Hummel (O'Malley), glee club members Brittany (Heather Morris), Santana Lopez (Naya Rivera), Mike Chang (Harry Shum, Jr.) and Matt Rutherford (Dijon Talton), school reporter Jacob Ben Israel (Josh Sussman), Principal Figgins (Theba) and former glee club director Sandy Ryerson (Stephen Tobolowsky). "Wheels" guest stars Cheryl Francis Harrington and Jeff Lewis as a nurse and manager at a local residential facility, and also introduces two characters with Down syndrome, Robin Trocki as Sue's sister Jean Sylvester, and Lauren Potter as Becky Jackson, a sophomore at William McKinley High School. Potter is a member of the Down's Syndrome Association of Los Angeles, and was contacted about auditioning through the association's in-house talent agency, Hearts and Hands. Fourteen actresses auditioned for the role, which Potter deemed "a great experience" to perform.

=== Music and choreography ===
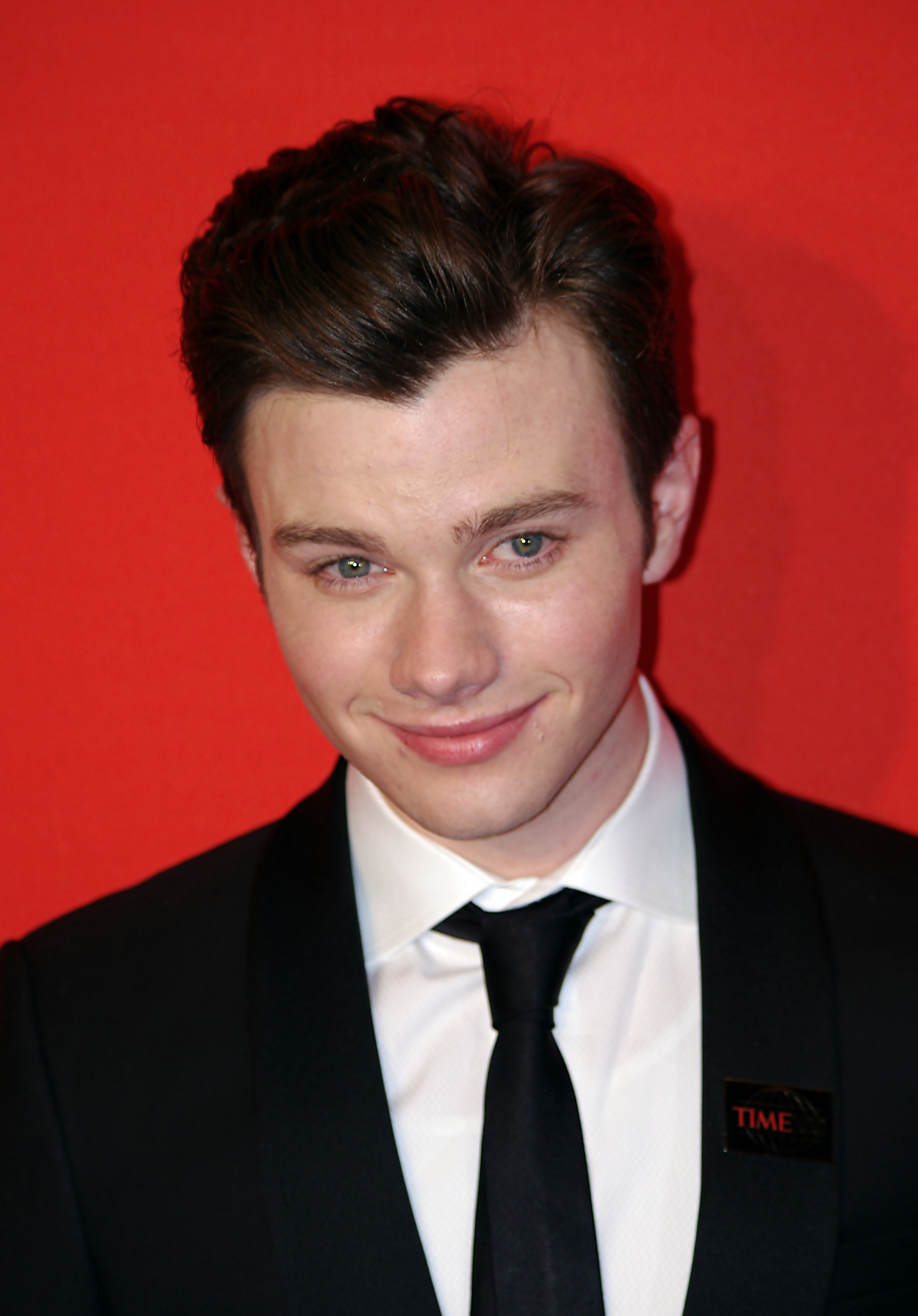
The "Defying Gravity" storyline was based on a high school experience of Chris Colfer

The episode features cover versions of Nouvelle Vague rendition of "Dancing with Myself", "Defying Gravity" from Wicked and the Ike & Tina Turner rendition of "Proud Mary". Glee cast versions of the songs, including both Michele and Colfer's solo performances of "Defying Gravity", were all released as singles available for digital download. While "Proud Mary" and "Dancing With Myself" did not chart, "Defying Gravity" reached number 58 in Australia, 38 in Canada and 31 in America. A duet version of "Defying Gravity" appeared on the soundtrack album "Glee: The Music, Volume 1".

Murphy selected "Defying Gravity" for the episode after Colfer relayed a story from his own high school days, whereby his drama teacher refused to let him sing the song because of his sex. Murphy explained: "I found a way to write it into the show because that's in a nutshell what this show is about: someone being told that they can't do something because of what the perception of them is as opposed to what their real ability is." Colfer stated that the opportunity to finally sing the song "really meant the world" to him, and that: "It's absolutely terrifying to watch yourself do something you've dreamed about for such a long time. I know I'm definitely not the best singer, but I think the message, the story behind the song about defying limits and borders placed by others, hopefully all that gets across with the performance. Although I do some very 'Kurtsy' things in the song, it's probably one of the most honest and close-to-heart scenes I've ever filmed or performed for that matter."

"Dancing With Myself" is McHale's first solo performance on the show. Murphy commented that the performance is Artie's chance to "break away from being misunderstood by everyone" and express himself, explaining that although Artie is usually "a very secure guy" who does not care about others' opinions of him, "Wheels" sees his friends take his disability for granted: "So this performance is all about him saying, 'Look, this is who I am, and this is who I want to be.'" McHale has stated that performing as Artie has made him more aware of the challenges that people with disabilities face: "It's a completely different side of life. More than ever, I realize how grateful I am to be able to get up between each take and walk around. I'm glad that I can represent that kind of life on television so millions of people see it every week. And the whole point of it is to show that Artie can still do everything everyone else can that matters."

Glee choreographer Zach Woodlee described "Proud Mary" as the "scariest" number produced to date, citing concerns with choreographing an entire routine in wheelchairs and problems building the correct staging. Woodlee explained the stage ramps were initially built too steeply, preventing the actors from ascending them in wheelchairs, and that the actors experienced problems learning to distribute their weight correctly, flipping the wheelchairs over backwards: "It was like roller derby. All of the actors would fall backwards and hit their heads—particularly Lea Michele. You lose your balance really quick when you try to go up a ramp in a wheelchair. Amber Riley caught an edge going down a ramp and fell off completely. There were pile-ups; there were crashes. Basically, everything that could go wrong, did." Murphy specified to Woodlee that cast members should not be able to leave their wheelchairs during the number, as: "Artie doesn't get to get up ever, so I didn't want anyone to get up." Woodlee agreed: "If it looked too fun and easy, it wouldn't read right. Ryan really wanted people to understand what Artie deals with."

== Reception ==
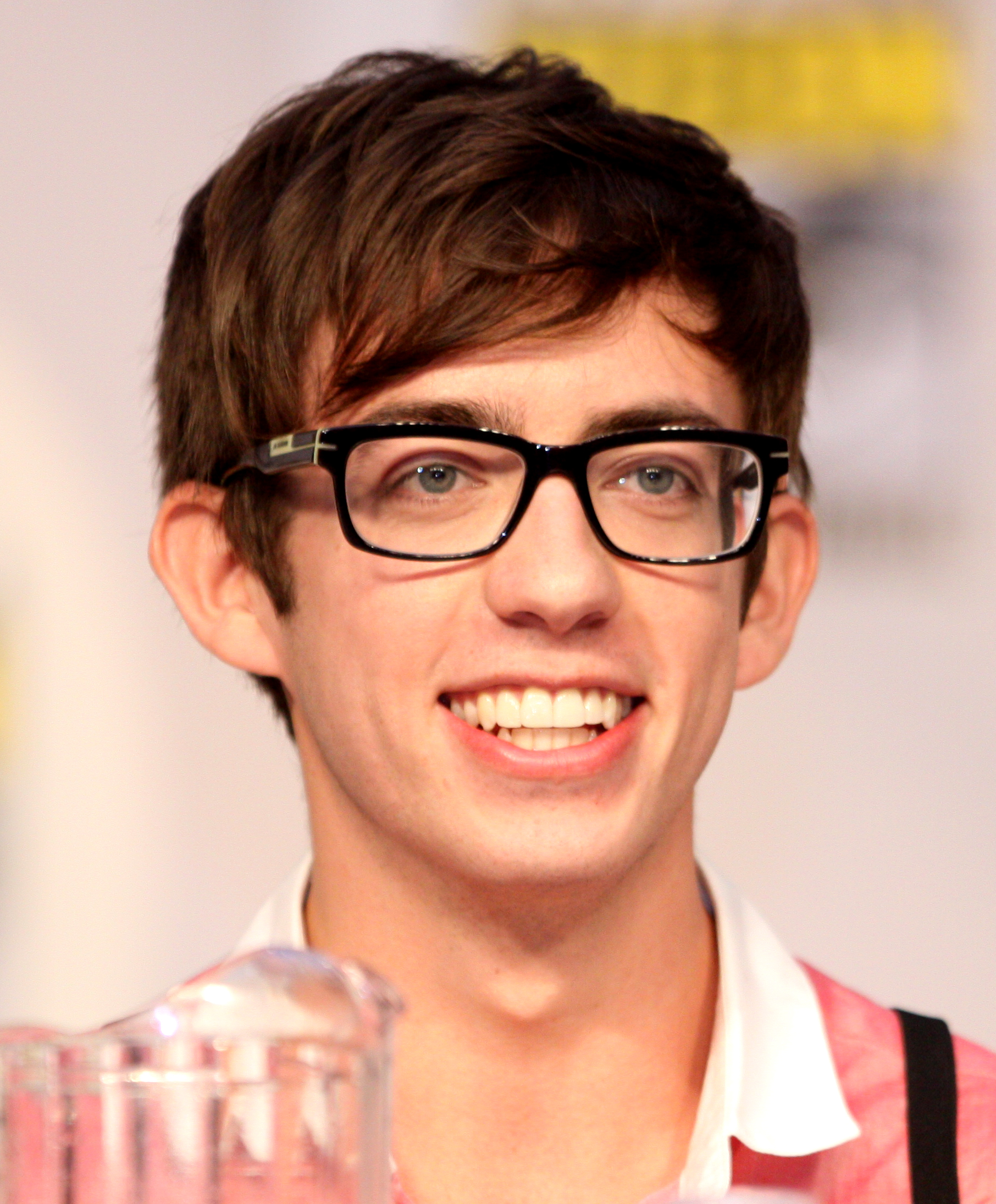
The casting of Kevin McHale, an able-bodied actor, as a character who uses a wheelchair, drew criticism from a committee of performers with disabilities

"Wheels" was watched by 7.35 million US viewers, and attained a 3.3/8 rating/share in the 18–49 demographic. It was the twenty-second most watched show in Canada for the week of broadcast, attaining 1.69 million viewers. In the UK, the episode was watched by 1.877 million viewers (1.463 million on E4, and 414,000 on E4+1), becoming the most-watched show on E4 and E4 +1 for the week, and the most-watched show on cable for the week.

Director Paris Barclay was nominated for the Directors Guild of America Award for Outstanding Directing of a Comedy Series for his work on "Wheels", competing against Glee creator Ryan Murphy, who was nominated for his work on Glee's pilot episode. The 62nd Primetime Emmy Awards again saw Barclay nominated for the "Outstanding Directing for a Comedy Series" award for "Wheels" against Murphy for "Pilot". O'Malley was also nominated for the "Outstanding Guest Actor in a Comedy Series" award for his role in the episode as Burt Hummel. Production mixer Phillip W. Palmer and re-recording mixers Joseph H. Earle Jr. and Doug Andham were nominated for the "Outstanding Achievement in Sound Mixing for a Television Series" award at the 2009 Cinema Audio Society Awards for their work on "Wheels". The episode was honored at the 2010 Television Academy Honors for exemplifying "Television with a Conscience". The Academy of Television Arts & Sciences called it a "dynamic" episode, which "paint[s] a portrait of how we treat others—and how we can do it better."

=== Critical reaction ===
The episode attracted criticism from a committee of performers with disabilities, who felt that casting a non-disabled actor to play a disabled student was inappropriate. CSI star Robert David Hall commented: "I think there's a fear of litigation, that a person with disabilities might slow a production down, fear that viewers might be uncomfortable." Glee's executive producer Brad Falchuk responded that while he understood the concern and frustration of disability advocates, McHale had the singing and acting ability and charisma required for the role and: "it's hard to say no to someone that talented". McHale has stated that he is pleased to represent a character in a wheelchair, and that: "I think what's great about it is just because he's in a wheelchair, he can still do what everyone else does." Kristin Dos Santos of E! refuted criticism of the episode, opining that: "'Wheels' is all about empowering people with disabilities and sends out an uplifting message to the disabled community." Gerrick Kennedy of the Los Angeles Times expressed a similar sentiment, stating: "Here we have an episode bluntly addressing the complexities of disability and doing so with so much respect and dignity, and there are complaints about Artie not being wheelchair-bound [sic] in real life? Cooooome on, guys."

Tim Stack for Entertainment Weekly called "Wheels" a "great, great episode", stating that it made him cry several times. MTV's Aly Semigran also commented that the episode brought her to tears, suggesting that Lynch's performance was Emmy-worthy and deeming "Wheels" "a truly standout hour of TV". Raymund Flandez of The Wall Street Journal reviewed the episode positively, calling Artie's rendition of "Dancing With Myself" "catchy" and "upbeat" and praising Rachel's "Defying Gravity" audition, which he wrote: "leaves us wanting for more." Kennedy described the episode as "sheer perfection", and James Poniewozik of Time made the pun: "Glee's always been a pleasure, but if it raises its storytelling ambitions this way, it can really defy gravity."

Alan Sepinwall of The Star-Ledger wrote that while he generally finds Glee to be "a show with a serious identity crisis", he did not dislike "Wheels" as much as previous episodes. Sepinwall wrote that while Glee can be "broad and in-your-face and self-congratulatory", this episode was "much more human-scaled [and] much more interesting." Maureen Ryan of the Chicago Tribune similarly commented that while other episodes of Glee lack "coherence and narrative drive", "Wheels" did not have this problem, describing it as "a case study of what Glee does right" and deeming Artie and Kurt's storylines "provocative and thoughtfully handled."

Mike Hale of The New York Times felt that the episode was problematic. He thought that having Kurt sabotage his own audition sent out a "mixed message", and believed that actress Lauren Potter was "used as a prop in the continuing humanization of Sue Sylvester." Hale wrote that the storyline felt "smarmy and artificial", though praised Lynch for making the scene with Sue's sister "warm and real". Entertainment Weekly's Dan Snierson felt that the revelation about Sue's sister was "a little manipulative", though wrote that he "didn't care in that glorious moment." He hoped that Glee's writers would not humanize Sue too often, however, fearing that she would lose her "dictatorial swagger". Eric Goldman for IGN rated the episode 7.5/10, commenting: "I really hope that episode was about getting a lot of 'issue' storylines out of the way all at once, because that was a lot of overkill." He felt that, although the episode contained "the usual strong humor, warm character moments and catchy musical performances", overall it felt "very afterschool special".
