= 100 (Glee) =

- Glee episode
- Episode no.: Season 5 Episode 12
- Directed by: Paris Barclay
- Written by: Ryan Murphy; Brad Falchuk; Ian Brennan
- Production code: 5ARC12
- Original air date: March 18, 2014

Guest appearances
- Gwyneth Paltrow as Holly Holliday; Kristin Chenoweth as April Rhodes; Dianna Agron as Quinn Fabray; Heather Morris as Brittany Pierce; Amber Riley as Mercedes Jones; Mark Salling as Noah "Puck" Puckerman; Harry Shum Jr. as Mike Chang; Lauren Potter as Becky Jackson; Chace Crawford as Biff McIntosh

Episode chronology
← Previous "City of Angels"	Next → "New Directions"
- Glee season 5

"100" is the twelfth episode of the fifth season of the American musical television series Glee, and the 100th episode of the series overall. Written by series co-creators Ryan Murphy, Brad Falchuk and Ian Brennan, and directed by Paris Barclay, it aired on Fox in the United States on March 18, 2014. The episode features the apparent end of New Directions after the club is shut down by principal Sue Sylvester (Jane Lynch). Many graduates of the glee club return, as do special guest stars Kristin Chenoweth as April Rhodes and Gwyneth Paltrow as Holly Holliday.

== Plot ==
Rachel Berry (Lea Michele), Kurt Hummel (Chris Colfer), Santana Lopez (Naya Rivera), Mercedes Jones (Amber Riley), Quinn Fabray (Dianna Agron), Noah "Puck" Puckerman (Mark Salling), Brittany S. Pierce (Heather Morris) and Mike Chang (Harry Shum Jr.) return to Lima for the glee club's last week. For their 100th assignment, glee club director Will Schuester (Matthew Morrison) asks old and new members alike to sing remixed versions of their favorite songs, and announces he has invited April Rhodes (Kristin Chenoweth) to join them. Will and April then lead the students in a performance of "Raise Your Glass".

Puck plans to rekindle his relationship with Quinn, only to find out she's dating Biff McIntosh (Chace Crawford), an arrogant billionaire, and has been hiding her past from him. Quinn, Santana and Brittany later perform "Toxic", but Brittany feels her dancing was not up to par, and feels she's lost her creative streak since learning she's a mathematical genius. Meanwhile, Rachel and Mercedes begin feuding over who is more successful, and decide to settle their dispute through a "diva-off", in which they perform "Defying Gravity" alongside Kurt, and leave it to the others to vote for who was better.

Will and April remind Principal Sue Sylvester (Jane Lynch) that April's charity foundation owns the auditorium, which means the glee club could move to the auditorium and rely on the foundation's funding to move forward, but Sue reveals that Will has already blown most of the money on costumes and scenery, and April's assets have been frozen, meaning glee club is still over.

Santana cheers up Brittany through a performance of "Valerie", backed up by Mike and Jake Puckerman (Jacob Artist). Puck then serenades Quinn with "Keep Holding On" and encourages her not to be ashamed of her past. Quinn tells Biff the truth, including that she has a daughter with Puck. He is infuriated and insults her, causing Puck to beat him up and throw him into the dumpster. Biff then breaks up with Quinn and returns to Yale.

During the diva-off voting, Santana humiliates Rachel, who is consoled by Mercedes. They reaffirm their friendship and gleefully accept that the votes are tied. They are soon joined by Holly Holliday (Gwyneth Paltrow), who was invited by April, and convinces the glee club to sing something new, leading to a rendition of "Happy". Puck and Quinn develop a relationship, and Brittany declares her love for Santana, though Santana is reluctant to date her again after their painful break-up.

Will reunites Rachel, Kurt, Santana, Mercedes, Artie, Tina, Puck, Quinn, Brittany and Mike in the auditorium and thanks them for being part of his life. April and Holly, who have been watching from the sidelines, realize how important glee club is to Will and decide to team up to save it.

== Production ==
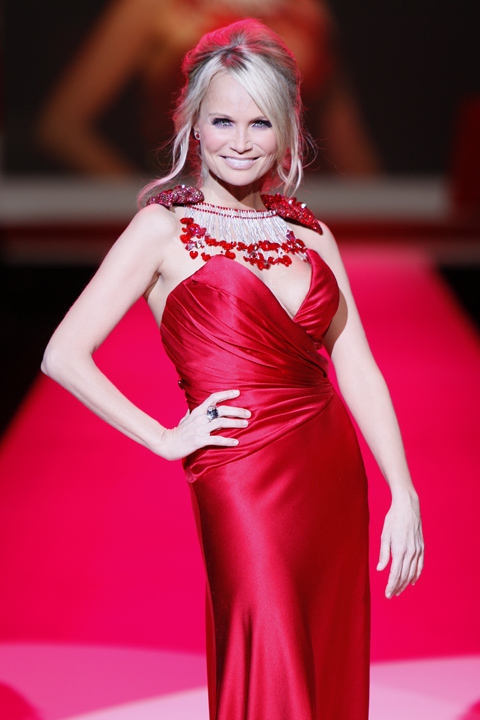
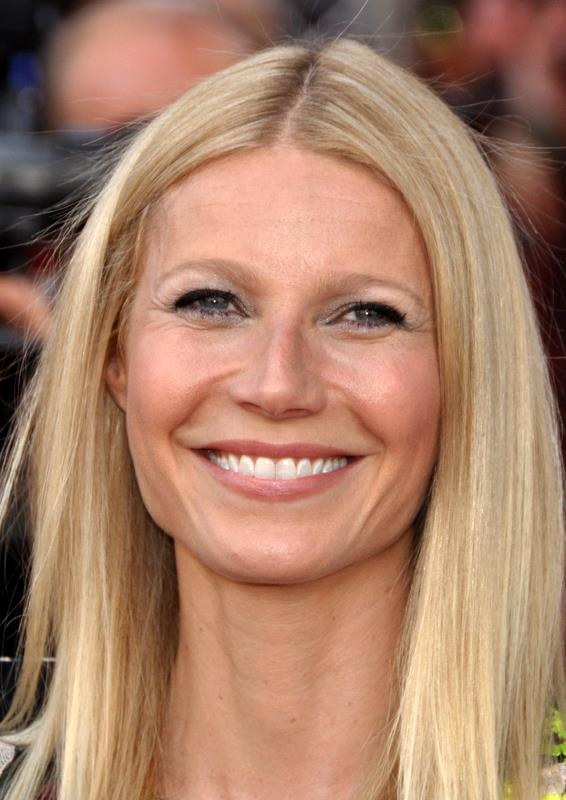
April Rhodes (Chenoweth, left) and Holly Holliday (Paltrow, right) return in this episode as special guest stars.

The 100th episode of Glee started production on December 19, 2013, the second-to-last day of filming in 2013, and resumed in January 2014. The episode had completed filming by January 29, 2014, when director Paris Barclay posted a number of tweets with photos from the final day of shooting. Barclay was responsible for the first part of the episode, scheduled to air on March 18, 2014; the second part, which is set to air a week later, was directed by series co-creator Brad Falchuk.

The show made a list of thirty songs that had previously been performed on the show, and invited fans to vote on which ones should appear in the 100th episode in a promotion called "Gleek's Choice" that was run at the end of November 2013. At least ten of these, which were not immediately announced, were set to be featured in this episode, though not necessarily sung by the same artists as before. The list of thirteen songs that was eventually released in late February 2014 for what turned out to be a two-part 100th episode contained eight songs from the original thirty-song list, not ten.

A number of former main characters on the show have returned for this two-part episode. These include Yale student Quinn Fabray (Dianna Agron), MIT student Brittany Pierce (Heather Morris), Noah "Puck" Puckerman (Mark Salling), who was last seen riding off to join the military, UCLA student and aspiring singer Mercedes Jones (Amber Riley), and Joffrey Ballet School student Mike Chang (Harry Shum Jr.).

Two characters played by special guest stars return as well: April Rhodes (Kristin Chenoweth), who went to Broadway to star in an original musical that won at least one Tony award, and substitute teacher Holly Holliday (Gwyneth Paltrow). A recurring character in this episode is cheerleader Becky Jackson (Lauren Potter). There is a new character appearing in the episode who is a potential Yale "love interest" for Quinn: Biff McIntosh, played by Chace Crawford.

An album, Glee: The Music – Celebrating 100 Episodes was released with thirteen songs on it, featuring music from both this episode and the next one (its second part). The full album was released on March 25, 2014, but the six songs from this episode were made available a week early on the day the episode aired. Five of the songs are new covers of songs that have previously appeared on Glee: the Mark Ronson and Amy Winehouse version of "Valerie" performed by Naya Rivera and Morris; Pink's "Raise Your Glass" sung by Chenoweth and Morrison; "Toxic" by Britney Spears, performed by Rivera, Morris, and Agron; "Defying Gravity" from the musical Wicked, featuring Lea Michele, Chris Colfer, and Riley; and Avril Lavigne's "Keep Holding On" sung by Salling. The sixth song, "Happy" by Pharrell Williams, which is new to the show, features Paltrow, Chenoweth, Morrison, Riley, and Darren Criss.

== Critical response ==
Suzanne Davis of TV Fanatic gave the episode a 3.5 out of 5 giving generally positive reviews, praising Gwyneth Paltrow's performance in "Happy" and Salling's version of "Keep Holding On" describing it "incredibly superior to the original" but gave a negative review of "Raise Your Glass" saying it had "so much auto-tune and very inappropriate for high school students".

Jerome Wetzel of Blog Critics gave the episode a negative review

"100" has great character moments, amid lots of story flaws and inconsistencies, and an overall weak lineup of musical numbers. What should be a celebrated milestone for the show ends up as another disappointing, mediocre let down. This is only part one of a two-parter, but it seems unlikely the next hour will redeem this one. I really hope I'm not writing the same thing about the series finale fifteen months or so from now.

Laura Frances of Screen Crave gave the episode an 8.5 out of 10, saying "Despite the cheesy scenes between Puck and Quinn, and Santana and Brittany, '100' was filled with great performances, sass and warmth. It was great to see the former Glee kids back singing and dancing and bickering. However, this also reminds us of how great Glee use [sic] to be. That's not necessarily a good thing."

Lauren Hoffman of Vulture gave the episode a 3 out of 5,

It would seem that the end of last week's episode wasn't all bluster – and forgive me for assuming it might have been, And while it's sad for everyone that glee club has been defunded, especially in the "end of an era" sense, it's arguably most difficult for the kids who will still be left at McKinley when it's over, with no choir room as a safe haven.

She mainly gave negative reviews on April Rhodes and Holly Holliday feeling that they had no real purpose. Hoffman did comment positively on Kurt Hummel performance of "Defying Gravity", saying "not just because he got to finally prove that he'd intentionally tanked the high note all those years ago. Rachel and Mercedes needed to prove something in the choir room; Kurt didn't. Good for him." and she also gave positive feedback on the Quinn and Puck storyline and the return of Heather Morris saying she was the "True MVP" of the episode.
