= Artie Abrams =

Fictional character from the Fox series Glee

- Glee character
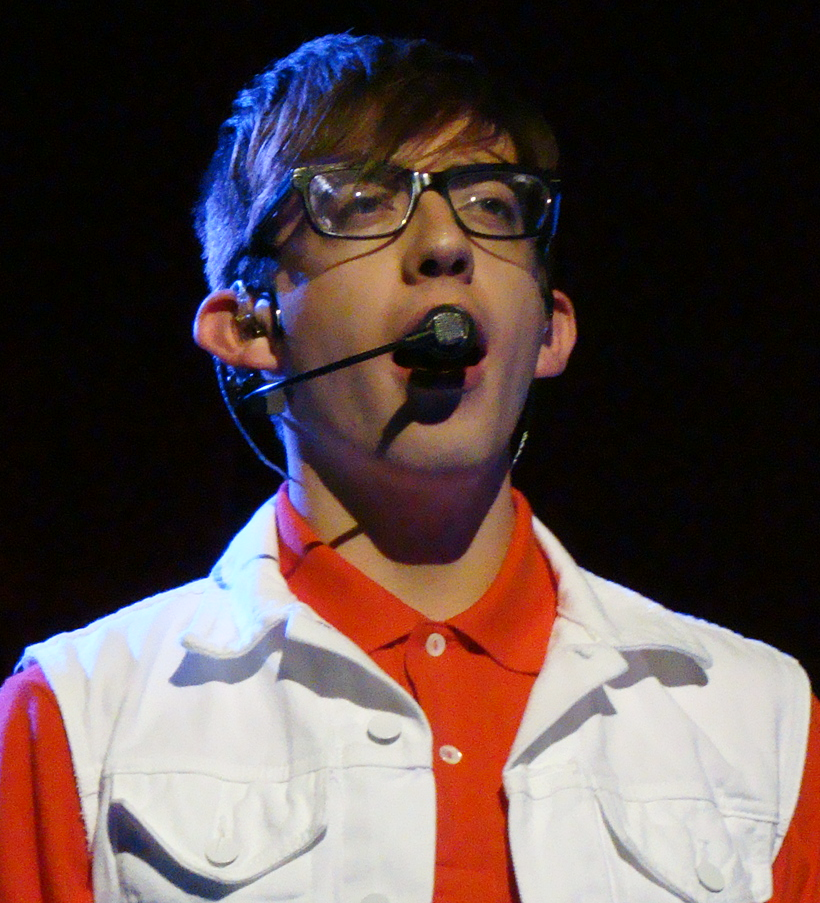
- Kevin McHale as Artie Abrams performing "Don't Stop Believin'" in June 2011 during Glee Live! In Concert!
- First appearance: "Pilot" (2009)
- Last appearance: "Dreams Come True" (2015)
- Created by: Ryan Murphy; Brad Falchuk; Ian Brennan
- Portrayed by: Kevin McHale

In-universe information
- Occupation: High school student (graduated); Film director
- Family: Nancy Abrams (mother)
- Significant others: Brittany Pierce; Kitty Wilde; Tina Cohen-Chang

Arthur "Artie" Abrams is a fictional character from the Fox musical comedy-drama series Glee portrayed as the "glue" of the glee club. The character is portrayed by actor Kevin McHale, and appeared in Glee since its pilot episode, first broadcast on May 19, 2009. Artie was developed by Glee creators Ryan Murphy, Brad Falchuk and Ian Brennan. He is a guitarist and paraplegic manual wheelchair user who is a member of the glee club at the fictional William McKinley High School in Lima, Ohio, where the show is set. Artie uses a wheelchair due to a spinal cord injury he sustained in a car crash at the age of eight. His storylines have seen him accept his disability, pine for the affections of fellow New Directions members, and dabble in film directing.

As Artie, McHale featured in many musical performances which were released as singles available for download. McHale joined Glee from a dance background, and found it challenging to adapt to using a wheelchair, but was able to utilize his dancing ability in episodes such as "Dream On", in which he dances in a shopping mall during a fantasy flash mob sequence. McHale stated that performing as Artie has made him more aware of the challenges that people with disabilities face, and was grateful to showcase how Artie can "still do everything everyone else can that matters".

== Storylines ==
Artie is introduced in "Pilot" as a guitar-playing member of the William McKinley High School glee club. He uses a wheelchair. He is constantly bullied by members of the school football team. He is also in the school's jazz ensemble, and it is later revealed that he is in the A.V. Club and a member of the Academic Decathlon team as well. During preparations for the Sectionals round of show choir competition, Principal Figgins (Iqbal Theba) decrees that there is no money in the school budget to hire a handicap-accessible bus to transport the glee club. The other students hold a fund-raising bake sale, but although they make enough money to hire a bus, Artie requests that they donate it to the school to pay for more wheelchair ramps in order to benefit future students. He goes on a date with club member Tina Cohen-Chang (Jenna Ushkowitz), who stutters, and explains that he was left paralyzed following a car crash when he was eight years old. The two share a kiss, but Artie is hurt when Tina confesses she has been faking her speech impediment since the sixth grade. He later forgives Tina, but makes sexist remarks about her fashion sense, demanding that she begin wearing skimpier clothes if she wants to be with him. Tina publicly confronts him for this behavior, and Artie apologizes; they kiss and become a couple.

When Tina learns that Artie's dream is to become a dancer, she asks him to perform in a tap dancing routine with her despite his paralysis, but their attempt fails miserably, and Artie asks Tina to leave. She later presents him with research on the progress of spinal cord injury treatments, raising Artie's hopes that he may soon be able to walk again, but guidance counselor Emma Pillsbury (Jayma Mays) reminds him that testing for these treatments will take many years. Artie comes to accept that he may never be a dancer, and tells Tina to choose another dance partner. Artie is dismayed when New Directions lose at Regionals, but thankful for having been a member of the glee club, admitting that Tina was his first kiss.

At the beginning of the second season, Artie asks Finn Hudson (Cory Monteith) to help him join the football team. He hopes to win back Tina, who has broken up with him to date Mike Chang (Harry Shum Jr.). The new football coach, Shannon Beiste (Dot-Marie Jones), believes that Finn is colluding against her by forcing her to reject a wheelchair-reliant student, and drops Finn from the team. After re-considering she accepts them both. Brittany Pierce (Heather Morris) pairs with Artie for the duets assignment and competition, and they start dating. Artie loses his virginity to Brittany, but before they compete Santana Lopez (Naya Rivera) tells him that Brittany only wanted him for his voice so she could win the competition. He is deeply upset that his first sexual experience was the consequence of such motivations, so he breaks up with Brittany and dissolves their partnership. Artie later realizes he wants her back, and with encouragement from Puck, they start a real relationship. Later, Artie confronts Brittany: he becomes upset that Brittany cannot recognize that she is cheating on him with Santana, and calls her stupid. Artie deeply regrets his words and tries to salvage their relationship, but she refuses.

At the beginning of the third season, Artie, now a junior, is asked to direct the school musical, West Side Story. Though assailed by self-doubt at the last minute, he is thanked by the cast, and he thanks them for trusting him. At the end of the school year, Artie and the others lead New Directions to victory at the Nationals competition. In the first episode of the fourth season, Artie chooses the new lead singer of New Directions, Blaine. Brittany runs for senior class president and picks Artie as her vice president, though they lose to Blaine and Sam. Finn returns to McKinley, and Artie visits him at work and asks him to help direct Grease, which Finn accepts. In the episode "Glee, Actually", after Artie injures himself on an icy ramp, he is angry and humiliated, and wishes he'd never had to be in a wheelchair. A subsequent dream, in which he imagines himself walking, but where New Directions failed to get off the ground without his presence, makes him realize his importance to the club. He began dating his underclassman and fellow glee club member Kitty Wilde (Becca Tobin) at the beginning of the fifth season, but broke up with her after he graduated in the mid season, right after the glee club was disbanded. He goes to a film school in New York.

In the final season, Artie, still at the film school, comes back to McKinley to help Rachel Berry (Lea Michele) recruit new members for the newly rebooted glee club. He occasionally returns to help the glee club during the season, and also attending Santana and Brittany's wedding. In "2009", the parallel episode to the "Pilot", it is revealed that he auditions for the glee club with the song "Pony", and that he (along with Tina) auditions because they were dared by their goth friends to do so. Artie is a successful film director as of the series finale, "Dreams Come True". His film, which stars Tina (who is also revealed to be his girlfriend), was accepted into Slamdance Film Festival in 2020. He returns to McKinley to attend a rededication to McKinley's auditorium to the late Finn Hudson and performs "I Lived" with former members of the New Directions for the final time and then takes a bow with the rest of the Glee cast.

== Development ==
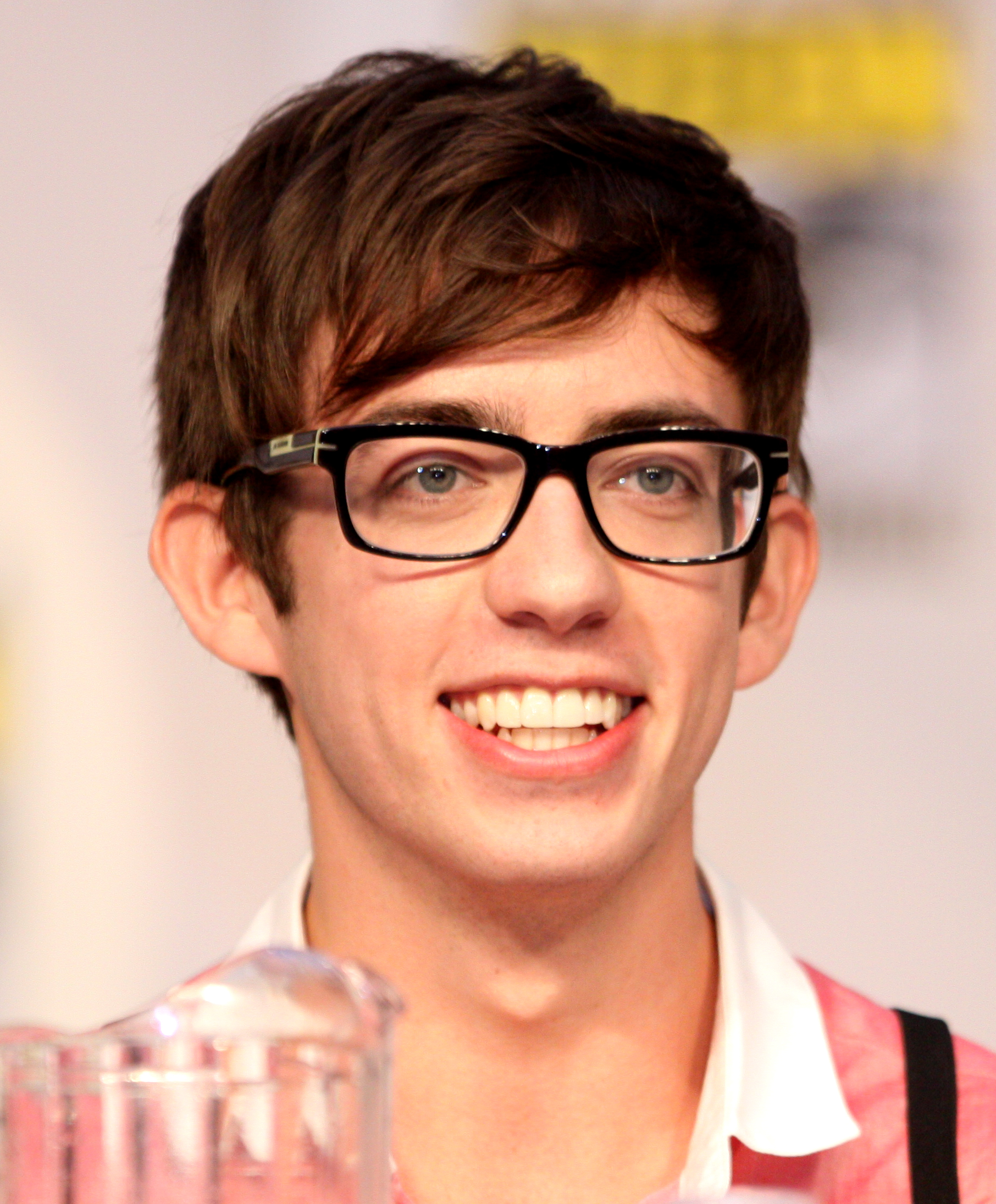
Kevin McHale plays Artie Abrams on Glee.

McHale auditioned for Glee coming from a boy-band background, having previously been a member of the quartet group NLT (Not Like Them) as one of two lead singers, with the song "Let It Be" by The Beatles. He found it challenging to adapt to using a wheelchair, having to overcome the instinctive urge to dance along or tap his foot during musical performances. He found it difficult to watch his colleagues dancing while he used a wheelchair, but still learned the same dance routines as the other cast members, and was able to stand in during rehearsals in the event of absences.

McHale performed in the 2010 Glee Live! In Concert! tour in character as Artie, remaining in a wheelchair during live performances. He used a wireless microphone headset instead of a regular wireless handheld microphone, as his hands were needed to control his wheelchair. He performed in a wheelchair when the Glee cast were invited to perform at the White House for the Obama family and guests in April 2010. McHale was able to utilize his dancing background in the episode "Dream On", in which Artie dances in a shopping mall during a fantasy flash mob sequence. He enjoyed the performance, but took time to pick up the choreography having spent so long working in a wheelchair. Although McHale prefers contact lenses, he auditioned for the part wearing glasses to enhance the "nerd" element of Artie's personality, and the thick glasses became a part of his costume.

McHale describes Artie as a "nerd" who loves the glee club whole–heartedly and uses it as a form of escapism. He believes that Artie has more confidence than he himself possesses, explaining: "I think he knows who he is and he doesn't care what anyone thinks." He enjoyed Artie's character development in the episode "Wheels," explaining that when he was cast in the role, he did not know Artie's background and thus made up his own backstory for him. He believed that Artie became paralyzed later in life, rather than being born that way, which is confirmed in "Wheels". Of the burgeoning romance between Artie and Tina, McHale opined: "I think Tina and Artie will be together. I think they will be a couple for a long time." He explained that from the beginning of the show's production, creator Ryan Murphy expressed the belief that Artie and Tina should be together, and so he and Jenna Ushkowitz deliberately sat close to one another during filming, assuming that it would eventually happen. McHale was shocked by Artie's reaction to Tina's faked stutter. He was initially unsure "why he was being so dramatic". He concluded however: "I really think Artie fell for Tina because they were set apart by their disabilities. They're already kind of outcasts being in glee, but within that group they shared a connection. So he based their whole relationship on that and when it went away, Artie didn't know what to do." McHale is close to his co–star Jenna Ushkowitz, and the two of them are in support of the relationship between their characters, referred to by the portmanteau "Artina", for Artie and Tina. McHale described Artie and Tina's relationship as being similar to the one between Cory (Ben Savage) and Topanga (Danielle Fishel) in the ABC comedy–drama Boy Meets World, and he believes they will always be together.

Artie, like a number of the students at McKinley High, is the "namesake" of one of Brad Falchuk's high school friends at Beaver Country Day School in Chestnut Hill, Massachusetts. The character was named for Arthur Stroyman, who helped Falchuk make horror films when they were teens. Stroyman was not much like Artie, however: he was an athlete who "never fully understood the artsy kids" in high school.

== Musical performances ==
As Artie, McHale features in many musical performances, which have been released as singles, available for download. In the episode "Wheels" he has his first solo performance on the show "Dancing With Myself". Murphy commented that the performance is Artie's chance to "break away from being misunderstood by everyone" and express himself, explaining that although Artie is usually "a very secure guy" who does not care about others' opinions of him, "Wheels" sees his friends take his disability for granted: "So this performance is all about him saying, 'Look, this is who I am, and this is who I want to be.'" McHale has stated that performing as Artie has made him more aware of the challenges that people with disabilities face: "It's a completely different side of life. More than ever, I realize how grateful I am to be able to get up between each take and walk around. I'm glad that I can represent that kind of life on television so millions of people see it every week. And the whole point of it is to show that Artie can still do everything everyone else can that matters."

In the episode "Dream On", Artie performs "The Safety Dance" and "Dream a Little Dream of Me", which received generally positive reviews. Aly Semigran of MTV noted that McHale's songs "proved he was a force to be reckoned with", and called the "I Dreamed a Dream" duet "goosebump-inducing", observing: "Pretty sure that's what musical theater lovers' dreams are made of." Entertainment Weekly's Tim Stack called "Safety Dance" one of his favorite moments of the episode, deeming it a "joyous, huge performance—definitely one of the most elaborate numbers the show has done before."

In the episode, "Britney/Brittany", Artie performs the Britney Spears song "Stronger". Tim Stack of Entertainment Weekly deemed it his favorite performance of the episode, as well as the best incorporation of Spears' music, as the song served Artie's storyline. He praised the increased use of McHale as a vocalist in the second season, enjoying his soulful voice. Raymund Flandez of The Wall Street Journal also enjoyed it, appreciating the twist of having males sing a feminist empowerment song. In "Never Been Kissed", Artie performs "One Love"/"People Get Ready" as a duet with Puck (Mark Salling), which received generally positive reviews. BuddyTV's Jen Harper enjoyed the harmonies and simple arrangement of "One Love/People Get Ready", and Anthony Benigno of the Daily News gave it an "A", with praise for the vocals. Tim Stack of Entertainment Weekly graded it "B−". He called it a "nice performance", but incongruous in context, a concern shared by Erica Futterman of Rolling Stone.

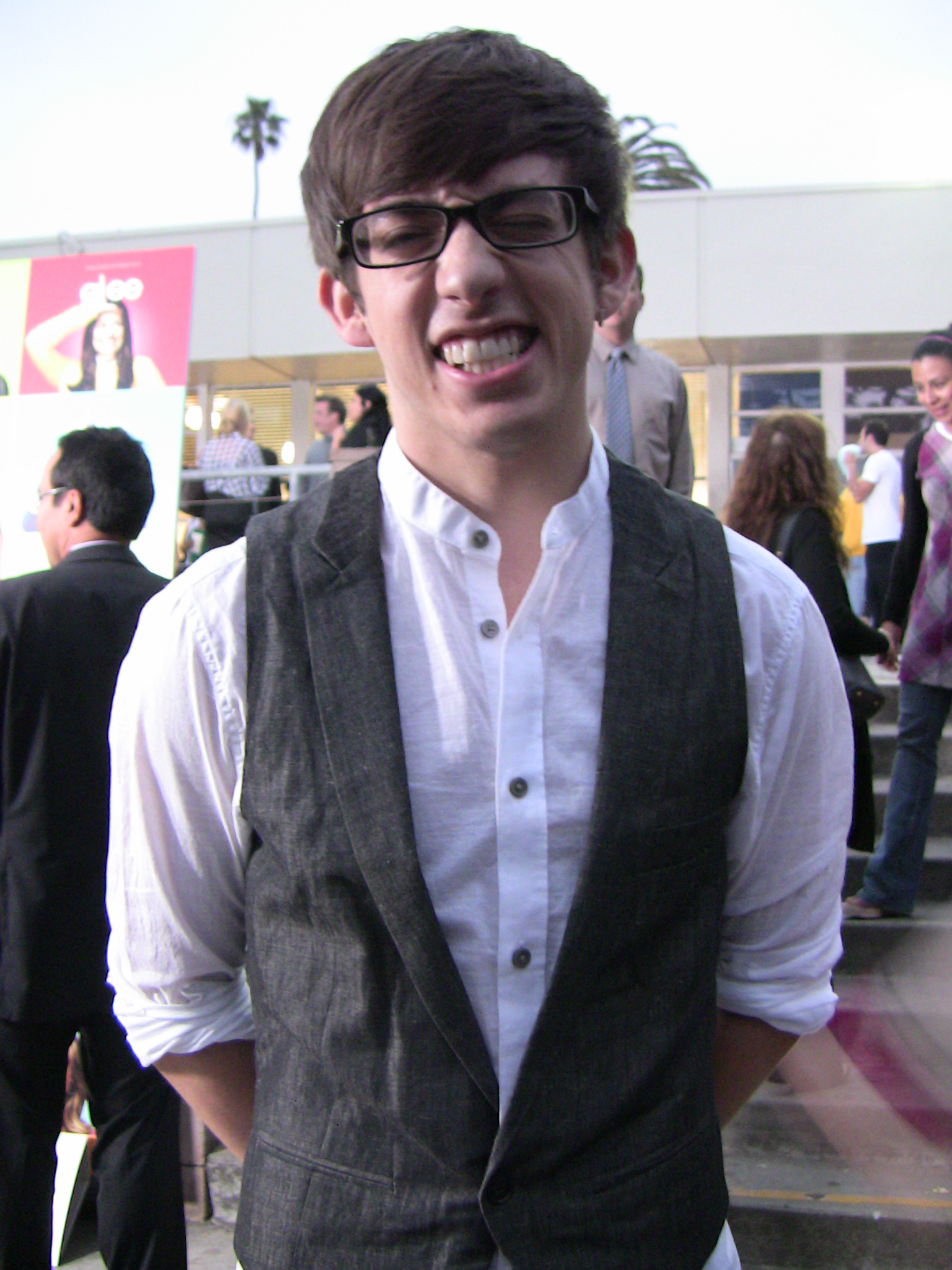
Artie (McHale, pictured) performed a mash-up of "Moves Like Jagger" and "Jumpin' Jack Flash" and was said to outshine "even Mike and Will who dance beside him".

In "Rumours", Artie performs "Never Going Back", which was very well received. Futterman said it was "better than Artie's post-Tina 'Stronger'", and John Kubicek of BuddyTV declared it "proof that he's quite good at hitting emotional notes", while Semigran said she was "blown away". Entertainment Weekly's Sandra Gonzalez and Anthony Benigno of The Faster Times both gave it an "A−", while Brett Berk's of Vanity Fair gave it all five stars. In the episode "Prom Queen", Artie performs "Isn't She Lovely", which was as enthusiastically received—it was Meghan Brown's of The Atlantic "favorite number", and she added that Artie's "voice sounded great". It was also Berk's favorite; he commented, "I still melt at Artie's serenade", and gave it four stars out of five. Both Gonzalez and Benigno gave it an "A", and the latter explained: "the arrangement ... gives the track a wonderful, spontaneous feel", and "this nerdy white boy has himself some soul." Kubicek dissented, and explained that Artie getting emotional in song two weeks in a row "is a tad boring".

In "Yes/No", Artie performs a mash-up of "Moves Like Jagger" and "Jumpin' Jack Flash". Flandez called it one of the episode's "highlights", and Billboard's Rae Votta lauded Ariey's "Jagger moves while sitting in a chair" and said he "outshines even Mike and Will who dance beside him". MTV's Kevin P. Sullivan described Artie as "consistently awesome", and TVLine's Michael Slezak said it was "one of Artie's more appealing musical moments this season" and gave it a "B". Entertainment Weekly's Joseph Brannigan Lynch characterized the song as a "spunky diversion" and gave it a "B+", but he noted it was "not a good song for marriage proposals by any stretch of the imagination", a point also made by Futterman, who said the number would have "fared much better as a stand-alone performance".

McHale's performance of "Scream" in "Michael" inspired several reviewers, including Kate Stanhope of TV Guide and Crystal Bell of HuffPost, to write of their regret that McHale could not dance more often on the show. Amy Reiter of The Los Angeles Times said he was "a sorely underused Glee resource" and called the number "the best dance moment" of the episode, and Bell declared, "I have one word for this number: Epic." The Wall Street Journal's Raymund Flandez called it a "phenomenal job", and Stanhope cited "killer performances" by McHale on this number and others as evidence that with Artie only a junior "there is life" in New Directions after McKinley's current seniors graduate. Joseph Brannigan Lynch of Entertainment Weekly called the number "awesome" and gave it an "A+", and The Hollywood Reporter's Lesley Goldberg described it as "a perfect example of what the show looks like when it's firing on all cylinders"; both reviewers praised the dancing of both performers. Jen Chaney of The Washington Post wrote that the performance "lacked the energy and genuine aggression of the original Michael/Janet Jackson collaboration, although at least Kevin McHale and Harry Shum Jr. got to show off their dance skills", and gave it a "C".

== Reception ==
Shawna Malcom of the Los Angeles Times reviewed the episode "Vitamin D" positively, praising the focus it gave Artie: "Until now, the character, who is a wheelchair user, has served mostly as a punchline. Last night, he got a much-deserved moment in the spotlight, and he rolled with it, doing his best Richie Sambora on the talk box, then taking lead vocals on the Usher track." The episode "Wheels", which placed focus on Artie and his disability, drew criticism from a committee of performers with disabilities, who felt that casting a non-disabled actor to play a disabled student was inappropriate. CSI star Robert David Hall commented, "I think there's a fear of litigation, that a person with disabilities might slow a production down, fear that viewers might be uncomfortable." Glee creator Brad Falchuk responded that while he understood the concern and frustration of disability advocates, McHale had the singing and acting ability and charisma required for the role and "it's hard to say no to someone that talented". McHale has stated that he is pleased to represent a character in a wheelchair, and that "I think what's great about it is just because he's in a wheelchair, he can still do what everyone else does." Kristin Dos Santos of E! Online refuted criticism of the episode, opining that: "'Wheels' is all about empowering people with disabilities and sends out an uplifting message to the disabled community." Gerrick Kennedy of the Los Angeles Times expressed a similar sentiment, stating: "Here we have an episode bluntly addressing the complexities of disability and doing so with so much respect and dignity, and there are complaints about Artie not being wheelchair-bound [sic] in real life? Cooooome on, guys." Despite playing a wheelchair user, he is actually one of the best dancers on the set, he was able to showcase his dancing skills in the 1x19 episode "Dream On", in which Artie imagines dancing with his Glee club friends and shoppers in a flash mob singing "Safety Dance" at a mall. He also showcases his dancing skills in the episode Michael, in which Artie imagines dancing and singing "Scream" along with Mike Chang (Harry Shum Jr.) in a remade "Scream" music video, and the episode Glee, Actually, in which Artie dreams about never being in a wheelchair, realizes that the lives of his friends have changed for the worse, and decides to found his own glee club, singing and dancing to Feliz Navidad.
