= Maureen Ryan =

American film and television critic, writer, and reporter (born 1966)

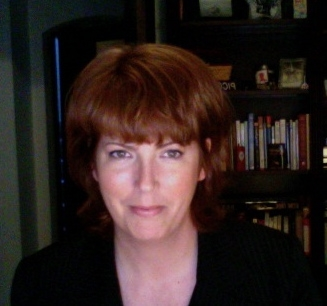
- Ryan in 2018
- Born: 1966 (age 59–60)
- Education: Washington University; Northwestern University
- Occupations: Film and TV critic; writer
- Children: 1
- Writing career
- Years active: 1993–present
- Website: www.moryan.com

Maureen "Mo" Ryan (born 1966) is an American film and television critic, writer and reporter. From 2000 to 2018, she was a TV critic at the Huffington Post and the Chicago Tribune. From 2015 to 2018, Ryan was the chief TV critic for Variety. Ryan is currently a contributing editor at Vanity Fair. Her book Burn It Down: Power, Complicity and a Call for Change in Hollywood was released on June 6, 2023.

== Early life and education ==
Ryan grew up in both Chicago's South Side and South Holland, Illinois.

Ryan graduated from Chicago Heights Marian Catholic High School. In 1988, she graduated from Washington University in St. Louis with a double major in psychology and English. In 1993, Ryan received a master's degree in journalism from Northwestern University's Medill School of Journalism.

== Career ==
From 1994 to 1998, Ryan edited and was chief contributor of the Chicago indie music zine, Steve Albini Thinks We Suck.

In 1992, Ryan began working at the Chicago Tribune. From 1997 to 2000, Ryan was an arts and entertainment editor, writer, and reporter. From 2000 to 2010, Ryan became the TV critic at the Trib. During her time there, Ryan created the Tribune's popular blog "The Watcher," which was nominated for an Espy Award.

From 2010 to 2015, Ryan worked at the Huffington Post as a TV critic.

In 2015, Ryan became the chief TV critic for Variety, a position she held until 2018.

In 2020, Ryan became a contributing editor at Vanity Fair.

Ryan has written for many publications including Broadcasting & Cable, Entertainment Weekly, MSNBC, NPR, Rolling Stone, Slate, among others.

=== #MeToo ===
In 2017, in the wake of #MeToo and the Harvey Weinstein scandal, Ryan revealed that she had been sexually assaulted in 2014 by a television executive, though for legal reasons she did not name him. Ryan said he was investigated after it happened, but continued to harass other women before he was hired by a different network. Ryan states this incident is what caused her two-month hiatus in 2015.

== Membership ==
- 2009-2015: Peabody Awards, Board of Jurors
- Television Critics Association, Board Member

== Selected works and publications ==
- Ryan, Maureen Mo; Bone, Simon G.; Joey the Germ; Nelson, Rylan; Sandberg, Pat (April 1995). "The interview issue" (zine). Steve Albini Thinks We Suck (6). Self Published.
- Ryan, Maureen Mo; Griffin, Robert (1998). "Issue 9" (zine). Steve Albini Thinks We Suck (9). Self Published.
- Ryan, Maureen (March 20, 2007). "The Watcher: The revolutionary 'Friday Night Lights' makes all the right moves". Chicago Tribune. Archived from the original on 23 March 2007.
- Ryan, Maureen (March 6, 2014). "Who Creates Drama At HBO? Very Few Women Or People Of Color". HuffPost.
- Ryan, Maureen (November 10, 2015). "Peak Inequality: Investigating the Lack of Diversity Among TV Directors". Variety.
- Ryan, Maureen (August 9, 2016). "FX CEO John Landgraf on the 'Racially Biased' System and Taking Major Steps to Change His Network's Director Rosters". Variety.
- Ryan, Maureen (December 6, 2016). "The Progress and Pitfalls of Television's Treatment of Rape". Variety.
- Ryan, Maureen (May 9, 2017). "'Peak' Performance: Director David Lynch had a vision to bring his iconic cult series back to tv -- but making it a reality proved a challenge all its own". Variety.
- Ryan, Maureen (October 9, 2017). "Men Must Step Up to Change the Hollywood Culture That Enabled Harvey Weinstein (Opinion)". Variety.
- Ryan, Maureen (October 18, 2017). "A TV Executive Sexually Assaulted Me: A Critic's Personal Story". Variety.
- Ryan, Maureen (October 26, 2017). "Can We End the Myth That You Have to Be a Bully to Make It in Hollywood?". Variety.
- Ryan, Maureen (February 14, 2018). "Showrunner and Activist Glen Mazzara on Creating Real Change in the TV Industry". Variety.
- Ryan, Maureen (July 6, 2018). "A Cult Show's Recipe for Success: Whiskey, Twitter and Complex Women". The New York Times.
- Ryan, Maureen (August 3, 2018). "Brad Kern and the House That Moonves Built at CBS". Vulture. New York Magazine.
- Ryan, Maureen (March 20, 2020). "How 'One Day at a Time' Came Back From the Brink". The New York Times.
- Ryan, Maureen (July 20, 2020). ""This Was Abuse": The Fall of a CBS Showrunner". Vanity Fair.
- Ryan, Maureen (June 6, 2023). Burn It Down: Power, Complicity and a Call For Change in Hollywood. Mariner Books. ISBN 978-0063269279.
