= Brittany Pierce =

Fictional character from the Fox series Glee

- Glee character
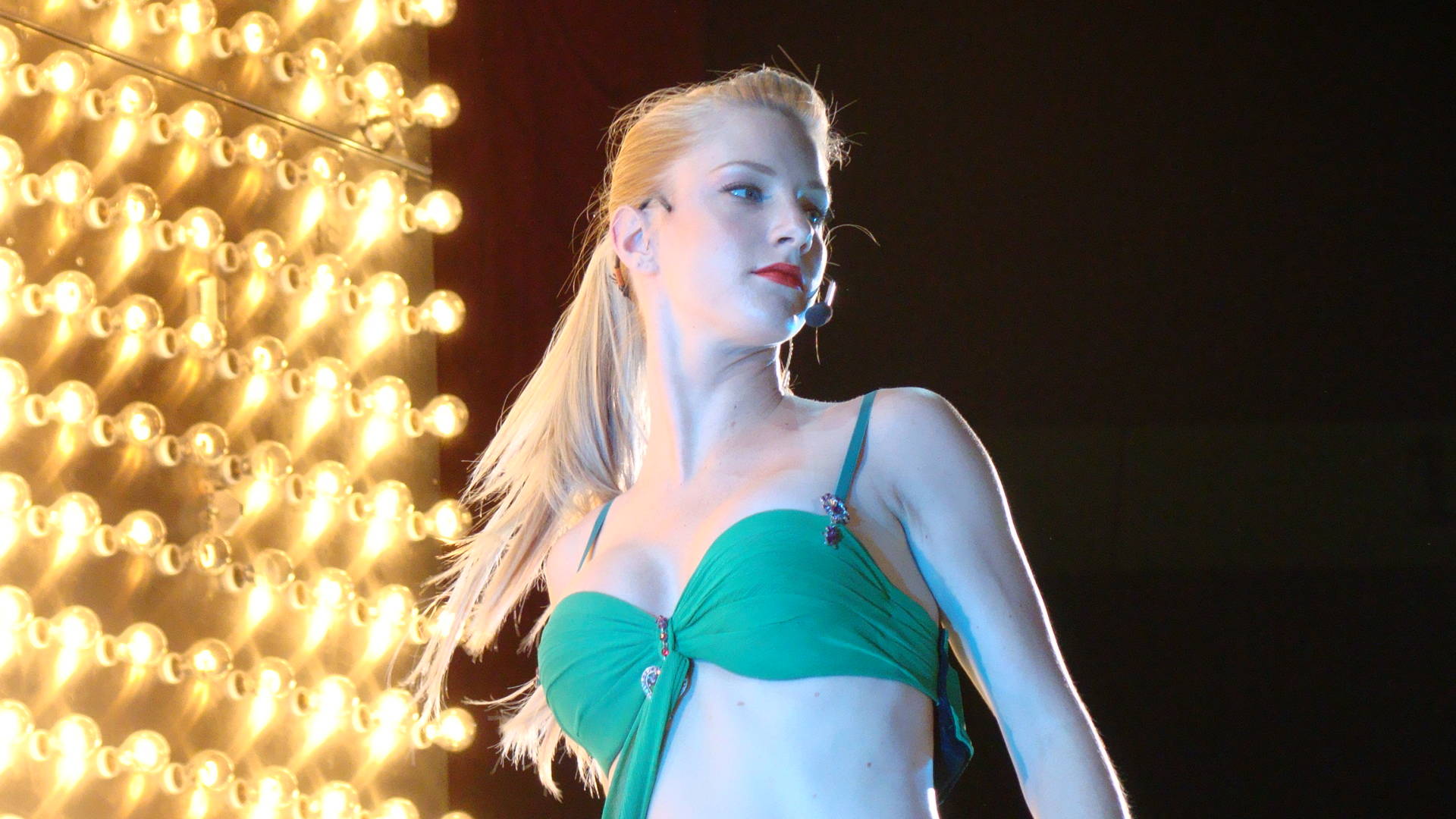
- Heather Morris as Brittany S. Pierce, performing "I'm a Slave 4 U" at the Glee Live! In Concert! 2011 tour
- First appearance: "Showmance" (2009)
- Last appearance: "Dreams Come True" (2015)
- Created by: Ryan Murphy; Brad Falchuk; Ian Brennan
- Portrayed by: Heather Morris

In-universe information
- Occupation: College Student (MIT); High School Student (WMHS)
- Family: Pierce Pierce (step-father); Whitney Pierce (mother); Stephen Hawking (biological father)
- Spouse: Santana Lopez
- Significant others: Artie Abrams; Sam Evans

Brittany Susan Pierce is a fictional character from the Fox musical comedy-drama series Glee. The character is portrayed by actress Heather Morris, and first appeared in the show's second episode, "Showmance". Brittany was developed by Glee creators Ryan Murphy, Brad Falchuk, and Ian Brennan. In Glee, Brittany is a ditzy cheerleader, or "Cheerio", for the fictional William McKinley High School, and a member of the school's glee club led by Will Schuester (Matthew Morrison). Morris was originally hired to teach Beyoncé's "Single Ladies (Put a Ring on It)" dance to the Glee cast. At that time, the series was looking for a third cheerleader, and Morris landed the role. Morris was upgraded to a series regular in the series' second season, in which Brittany is given a larger storyline, solos and dance routines to perform.

Morris plays Brittany as unconventional, often scatterbrained, but also entirely well-meaning and goodhearted. She has said that Brittany "love[s] everybody, no matter who they are"; she is frequently smiling and being nice to people. Brittany's character traits include her finding recipes confusing, mistaking her nipples for pepperoni, thinking her cat, Lord Tubbington, is reading her diary, and not knowing her right hand from her left. These facts are often presented in one-liners delivered by Morris, many of which she has ad-libbed. The character's perceived lack of intelligence, well-intentioned cluelessness, and entirely forthright manner of speaking mean, as Morris puts it, that "Brittany is used by the series' writers to say things no other character would". The character has also received positive reviews related to her romantic storyline with her closeted best friend Santana Lopez (Naya Rivera). While Brittany is bisexual, and is unashamed of that, Santana had trouble accepting her sexuality. However, Brittany always supported Santana and urged her to be true to herself.

The character has been received favorably with television critics. Snarker called Brittany and Santana her "new favourite Glee pairing", and commented: "While Heather Morris (Brittany) and Naya Rivera (Santana) have had minimal screen time, they’ve made it count. Heather in particular has brought the laughs as the Cheerio least likely to get a Mensa invitation." Brittany has attracted comparison to Amanda Seyfried's character from the 2004 hit teen comedy Mean Girls. Morris also received acclaim for her dancing and her portrayal as Brittany.

== Storylines ==
=== Season 1 ===
Brittany first appears in Glee during the show's second episode, as a member of William McKinley High's cheerleading team, the Cheerios. She joins the glee club, New Directions, with her friends and fellow cheerleaders Quinn Fabray (Dianna Agron) and Santana Lopez (Naya Rivera). Cheerleading coach Sue Sylvester (Jane Lynch) then enlists the three of them to help her destroy the club from the inside. When the club is due to compete at the sectionals round of show choir competition, Brittany unknowingly leaks their set list to Sue, who leaks the routines to competing glee clubs. New Directions put a new set list together at the last minute, and go on to win the competition regardless. Brittany also reveals that she and Santana have had sex, but are not dating. Following the club's victory at sectionals, Sue renews her effort to bring them down, and enlists Brittany and Santana to break up co-captains Rachel Berry (Lea Michele) and Finn Hudson (Cory Monteith). They invite Finn on a date with the both of them, but ignore him throughout the evening and ultimately request that he sit in the car and leave them to finish their meal alone. She mentions in the episode "Bad Reputation" that she has made out with almost everyone in the school – guys and girls alike, and the school janitor. She also briefly dates Kurt Hummel (Chris Colfer) in the episode "Laryngitis" as he wants to appear more masculine to impress his father and he is the only guy she has not made out with in the school.

=== Season 2 ===
In the second season episode "Duets", she asks Santana to be her partner for the duet competition while they are making out. Santana rejects her, so Brittany attempts to make her jealous by dating fellow glee club member Artie Abrams (Kevin McHale). She sleeps with Artie, but Santana tells him that Brittany was just using him for his voice, so he breaks up with her, to Brittany's dismay. Brittany's relationship with Artie continues to develop; in "Never Been Kissed", he gets her to go out with him again. As of "Furt", they are officially dating. In "Sexy", following her performance of "Landslide" with Santana and Holly Holliday (Gwyneth Paltrow), Santana admits her true feelings for Brittany. Although Santana fears being ostracized by the McKinley High student body for being in a same-sex relationship, she confesses her romantic love to Brittany, feelings which are reciprocated. However, Brittany states that she loves Artie too, and would never do anything to hurt him, even if it means not being able to be with Santana. She says that if she and Artie ever break up, she would be Santana's, proudly so. Brittany and Artie do break up, but she and Santana don't start dating until the third season.

=== Season 3 ===
Brittany runs for senior class president in the third season, starting in "I Am Unicorn", and wins the election in "I Kissed a Girl", defeating Kurt in the balloting. She and Santana join the Troubletones, a rival all-girls show choir at McKinley, and formally begin dating; after Santana is outed by Finn, they are open about their relationship. The two rejoin New Directions after the Troubletones lose to them at Sectionals. Santana sends Brittany a singing valentine in "Heart", and the two publicly kiss afterward. In "Saturday Night Glee-ver", concerned about Santana's future plans, Brittany gets the idea to ask Sue to arrange for Santana to get a full scholarship to the top college cheerleading program in the country. After a year of being a do-nothing class president, Brittany puts on a dinosaur-themed senior prom. In the season finale, Brittany reveals that she has a 0.0 GPA, has gotten into the Purdue Chicken Factory, and will have to repeat her senior year.

=== Season 4 ===
In the first episode of the fourth season, Brittany competes to become the lead singer of New Directions, but loses to Blaine (Darren Criss). She then loses to him again when she runs to be a second-term senior class president. Santana formally breaks up with Brittany because she feels that their long-distance relationship is not working, though the two remain friends. She then becomes 'blonde buddies' with Sam Evans (Chord Overstreet), and then starts to date him. Santana comes back to try and break them up, however fails. Brittany visits MIT, where she is dubbed a mathematical genius. Returning to Lima, she becomes arrogant, refuses to perform at Regionals, leaves the Cheerios, and breaks up with Sam. After Will and Sue fail to get Brittany to change her attitude, Sam gets Santana to return to Lima to intervene. After talking with Santana, Brittany decides to perform at Regionals. Brittany reveals to the glee club she has been offered early admission to MIT and delivers an emotional goodbye, as she will be leaving after Regionals.

=== Season 5 ===
Brittany returns to McKinley in "100" along with other New Directions alumni following the closure of the Glee club. Brittany states her unhappiness at being a math genius and kisses her ex-girlfriend Santana. In "New Directions", Brittany agrees to dropping out of MIT before going on a trip to Lesbos with Santana. Santana asks Brittany to go with her to New York after their trip, and Brittany accepts. Brittany finally graduates in the episode, one year late. Brittany returns to New York in the last episode of the season "The Untitled Rachel Berry Project" but she finds out that Santana is out of town shooting another Yeast-I-Stat commercial.

=== Season 6 ===
At the beginning of season six, Brittany returns with Santana and the rest of Glee club alumni to McKinley High School in "Homecoming" to help Rachel and Kurt recruit for New Directions. In "Jagged Little Tapestry", while the alumni stick around for another week, Brittany is surprised by Santana's marriage proposal and gladly accepts. Brittany and Santana then return in "What The World Needs Now" to deal with Santana's disapproving grandmother Alma – with whom she hasn’t spoken since coming out as a lesbian. Brittany takes matters into her own hands and tries to invite Alma to the wedding, but Alma's prejudice is too strong and she rejects their engagement, and Brittany tells her off for doing so. Later the New Directions serenade them in an attempt to be invited to their upcoming wedding. Brittany and Santana are wed in a double ceremony with Kurt and Blaine in the eighth episode "A Wedding". Before the ceremony, Sue arrives with Alma, who she has helped to realize that although she may not believe females should marry each other, family is the most important thing, leading her and Santana to reconcile. Brittany and Santana return briefly in the last minutes of the series finale "Dreams Come True" for a last performance with the rest of the Glee Cast to take a bow.

== Creation and casting ==
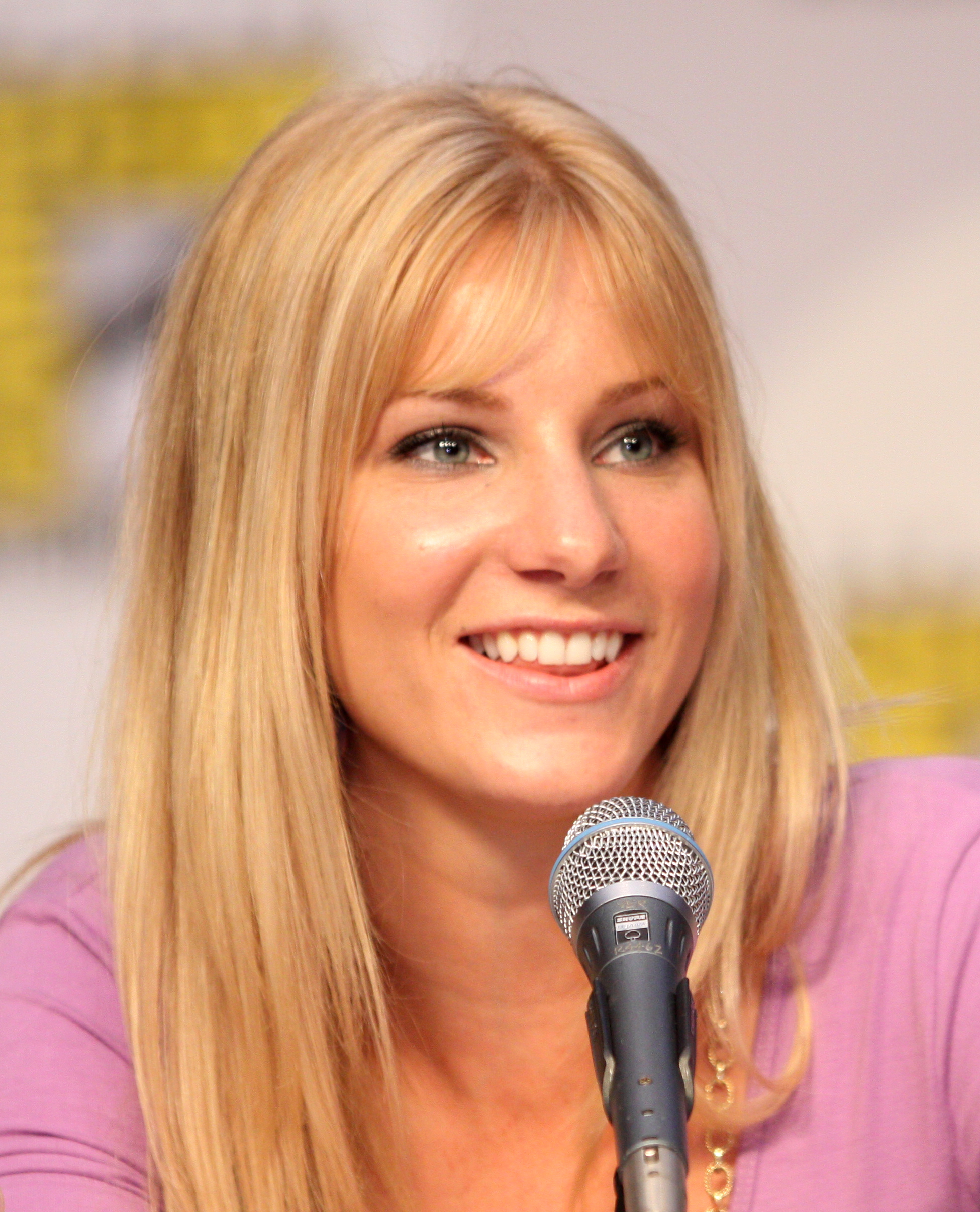
Heather Morris (pictured) improvised many of Brittany's one-liners during filming

Brittany first appears as a guest character in the second episode of the first season of Glee. She was brought in as a member of William McKinley High's cheerleading team, the Cheerios. Brittany is regularly played by actress Heather Morris. Morris grew up with a strong background in choreography. She was taking acting classes and actively pursuing an acting career when she was offered a spot on recording artist Beyoncé world tour as a dancer. Morris, however, turned down the job. Shortly thereafter, she was asked by Glee's choreographer Zach Woodlee to teach the choreography for Beyoncé's "Single Ladies (Put a Ring on It)" dance to the Glee actors. At the same time, the show was looking for a third cheerleader, they originally wanted to have the third be African American, but Morris ended up landing the role of Brittany Pierce. Initially a background character who hardly ever spoke, the role grew as writers discovered Morris had a gift for delivering one-liners. In an interview with Brandon Voss of The Advocate, Morris said of her casting:

"About six months after I first moved to L.A., I got a job doing Beyoncé's tour. After I finished the tour, I started working with choreographer Zach Woodlee, who started hiring me to do things like Fired Up! and Eli Stone. Prior to the Single Ladies tour I was supposed to move to New York to do West Side Story, but then I dropped dancing and started acting classes because I didn't want to dance anymore and I really wanted to fulfill my lifelong dream of acting. Zach called me and was like, 'Are you in New York?' I was like, 'No, I'm still here in L.A. and I'm acting.' He was like, 'OK, I need you to come in and teach the 'Single Ladies' dance to Chris Colfer and Jenna Ushkowitz for this TV show I'm doing, Glee. Since you're acting now, I know Ryan Murphy would love to consider you for a part. Look as cute as you can so he'll love you even more.' So I went in to teach the kids with a full-on outfit. I was scheduled to read with Ryan Murphy twice, but he canceled both times. After that, Zach called me and said they might not hire me anyway because they wanted the third cheerleader to be black, so my hopes were shot. But then my agent called a week later and said, 'You're now cast as Brittany in Glee.' So it was nuts."

Brittany's role in the show was initially intended to be minor, but grew towards the end of the first season. She does not have any solo musical performances during season one, but Morris hoped she would have one in the second season. On April 27, 2010, Michael Ausiello of Entertainment Weekly reported that Morris would be upgraded to a series regular for season two. Speaking to E!, Morris commented: "It's so fun. I literally just stand there and doze off and then I'm like, 'Oh yeah, I have to speak now!'" At the 2010 Television Critics Association Summer Press Tour, Murphy stated that Brittany would have "big storylines" in the new season, as viewers want to know more about her.

== Characterization ==
Some of Brittany's most memorable lines are unscripted, and are instead devised by Murphy during filming, or improvised by Morris. Morris portrays Brittany as being "literally insane". She is used by the series' writers to say things no other character would, to the point that Morris considers some of her lines nonsensical. Brittany's character traits include her finding recipes confusing, cheating off intellectually disabled classmates, thinking her cat is reading her diary, and not knowing her right hand from her left. She is friendly towards all the other characters, and Morris has explained that Brittany "love[s] everybody, no matter who they are", so she is frequently smiling and being nice to people. Morris bases her portrayal of Brittany on the character Karen Smith from the film Mean Girls. She plays Brittany as being very innocent, rather than stupid. In the episode "A Night of Neglect", Brittany participates in an academic decathlon as a seat warmer, but surprisingly ends up contributing to the win due to the fact that she is somewhat of an idiot savant on the topic of cat diseases. It is also revealed in "Britney/Brittany" that Brittany is also "Britney Spears" as her middle initial is "S" making her "Brittany S. Pierce".

At the Paley Festival Glee panel in March 2010, Murphy stated that Brittany and Santana would be seen to make out during the show's first season. Morris and Rivera only became aware of this after reading a Paley Festival report online. When they asked Murphy about the development, he claimed to have made the statement "to get a kick" out of the "dirty guy" asking about them. Murphy told Morris and Rivera that Glee would not push relationships to appease the show's fans, but would only pursue those which were "organic and natural." While there are moments on the show which depict Brittany and Santana as being very close to one another, Morris attributes these to her close relationship with Rivera: "that is just Naya and I joking around with each other and being really close. It's always her and I just messing around and they end up using it."

Later in 2010, when interviewed by After Ellen and discussing the large lesbian audience of Glee, Ryan Murphy confirmed that season two would contain at least one kiss between Brittany and Santana. In January 2011, several months after Brittany and Santana are seen in bed together, Glee co-creator Brad Falchuk further confirmed that "Brittana is on. Brittana was always on."

== Musical performances ==
Brittany performs in many of the series' musical numbers, though she does not have a solo line until the second season. In that season's second episode "Britney/Brittany", Brittany performs "I'm a Slave 4 U" as a solo and "Me Against the Music" as a duet with Santana. Songs by Morris as Brittany have been released as singles, available for digital download, and have also featured on the show's soundtrack albums. Brittany sings lead for Kesha's "Tik-Tok" in the episode "Blame It on the Alcohol". Candace Bulter of ScreenCrave praised the New Directions performance of the song and wrote, "Ke$ha might be able to out-drink the Glee members, but their cover of her song was phenomenal." She went on to praise Brittany's choreography and voice, calling it "mad" and "awesome". Sandra Gonzalez of Entertainment Weekly praised all of the musical performances and covers of that episode. In the season finale, she sings solo lines in the glee club's Nationals performance of the original song "Light Up the World". In the third season, Brittany's first major performance was in the third episode "Asian F", where she sings lead on Beyoncé's "Run the World (Girls)", which garnered superlatives from many reviewers including Kevin Fallon of The Atlantic, who wrote, "Brittany's performance of 'Run the World (Girls)' was thrilling. It was the most adrenaline-pumping musical number the series has produced: intricately choreographed, expertly shot and edited, perfectly woven into the story, and performed exquisitely by Heather Morris." She also performs a duet with Santana on "I Wanna Dance With Somebody (Who Loves Me)" in the Whitney Houston tribute episode "Dance With Somebody".

== Critical reception ==
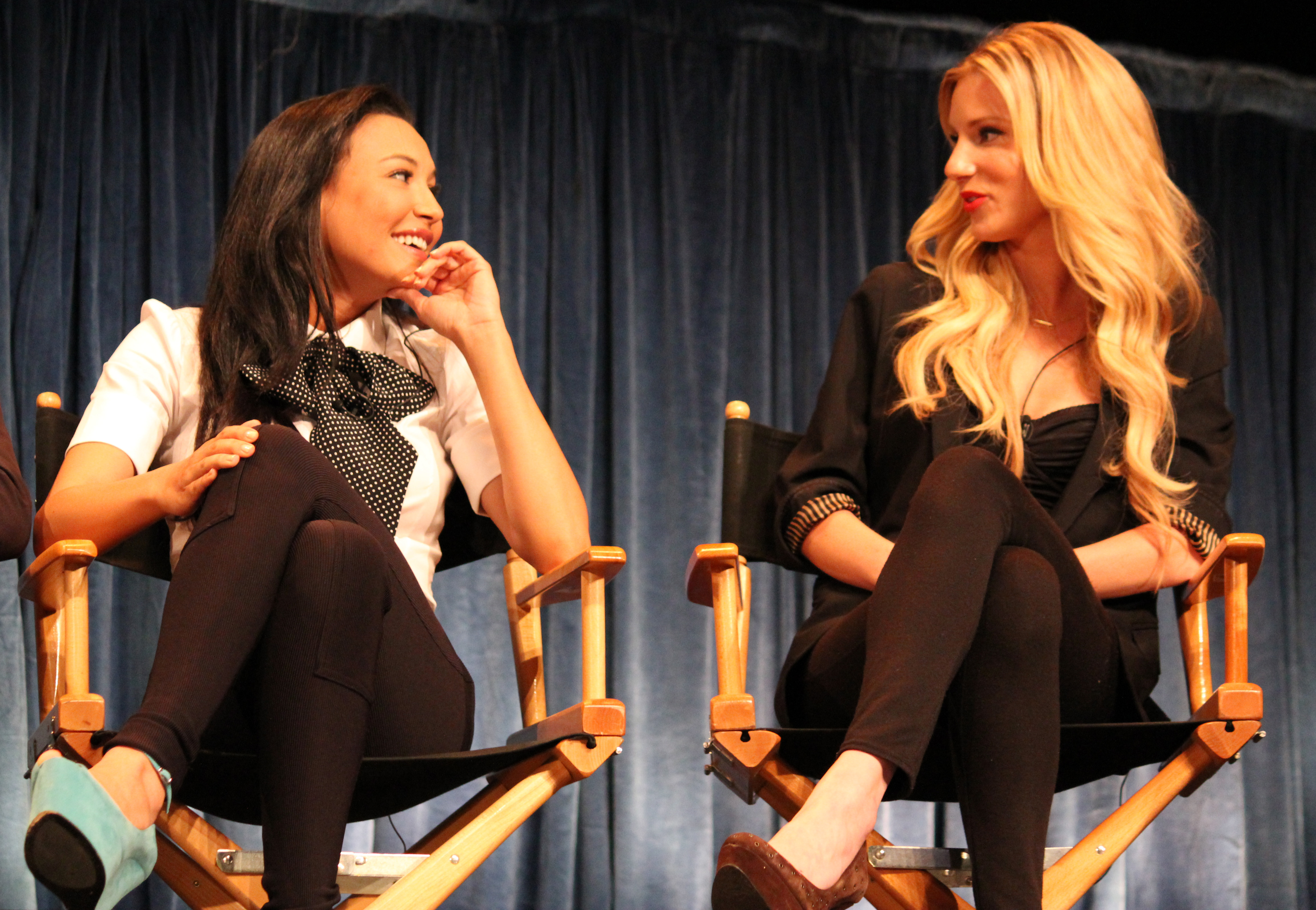
The relationship between Santana (Naya Rivera, left) and Brittany (Heather Morris, right) has been well received by critics and viewers.

E! Online's Megan Masters has compared Brittany to Sue, and stated that Brittany's one-liners "easily rival" Sue's. She deemed Brittany "brainlessly brilliant", and thanked the Glee producers for creating her: "Never before have we had the pleasure of enjoying such a ridiculously dumb—yet always loveable—character on television." When a promotional clip for the episode "Sectionals" indicated that Brittany and Santana had slept together, Dorothy Snarker, when writing for lesbian entertainment website AfterEllen, praised the pairing and referred to it by the portmanteau "Brittana". Snarker called the two her "new favourite Glee pairing", and commented: "While Heather Morris (Brittany) and Naya Rivera (Santana) have had minimal screen time, they’ve made it count. Heather in particular has brought the laughs as the Cheerio least likely to get a Mensa invitation. Never mind Finn and Rachel – I’m on Team Brittana now."

Morris' performance in "Britney/Brittany" attracted critical praise; Lisa de Moraes called "Britney/Brittany" a "great showcase" for the actress, and praised her "spectacular dance moves" and "deadpan flare". In her otherwise negative review, Emily St. James deemed Morris "hysterical throughout" and the cast's best dancer. She stated, "Murphy seems intent on running this character into the ground, but Morris isn't going to have her stop being funny without a fight." Jenna Mullins of E! Online observed, "When Ryan Murphy said this episode was a celebration of Heather, he wasn't kidding", and commended her musical performances. Robert Canning of IGN was initially concerned that the episode would diminish Morris' appeal by elevating her from a background role, but was ultimately pleased that it managed to retain her "fan favorite" secondary character status. While Poniewozik asked "have we gotten to the point as a society where it's unremarkable that the most popular scripted TV show in the 18 to 49 demographic is also—almost without comment or controversy—the gayest show on broadcast TV?", Ann Oldenburg of USA Today questioned whether Glee had gone too far by its depiction of Brittany and Santana kissing and their reference to the sexual act called "scissoring". Christie Keith, in writing for the lesbian and bisexual media website AfterEllen, suggested that "Duets" was the "queerest episode of any series that's ever been on television", and stated that she was moved to tears by the final scene of Brittany forlorn without Santana. AfterEllen.com also listed her in their Top 50 Favorite Female TV Characters.

Robert Canning praised Morris for her performance in "A Very Glee Christmas", and wrote: "The heart of "A Very Glee Christmas" was found in Artie Abrams attempt to keep Brittany's belief in Santa Claus alive. Heather Morris perfectly played up Brittany's innocence and joy surrounding everything Santa. Her interaction with the black mall Santa was a highlight. Watching Artie, and eventually the rest of the club, work to keep Brittany's belief intact was truly in the spirit of Christmas and should have been made into a fuller part of the episode. Also shining in this storyline was Dot Jones as Coach Bieste. Her scene as Santa, and then her knowing expression as she watched Artie walk, were the best moments of the episode." In January 2010, Morris and her co-stars won the Screen Actors Guild Award for Outstanding Performance by an Ensemble in a Comedy Series. Later that year, Brittany and Santana were nominated for the "Favorite Fictional Lesbian Couple" award at the AfterEllen.com Visibility Awards.
