= Heather Morris =

American actress, dancer, and singer

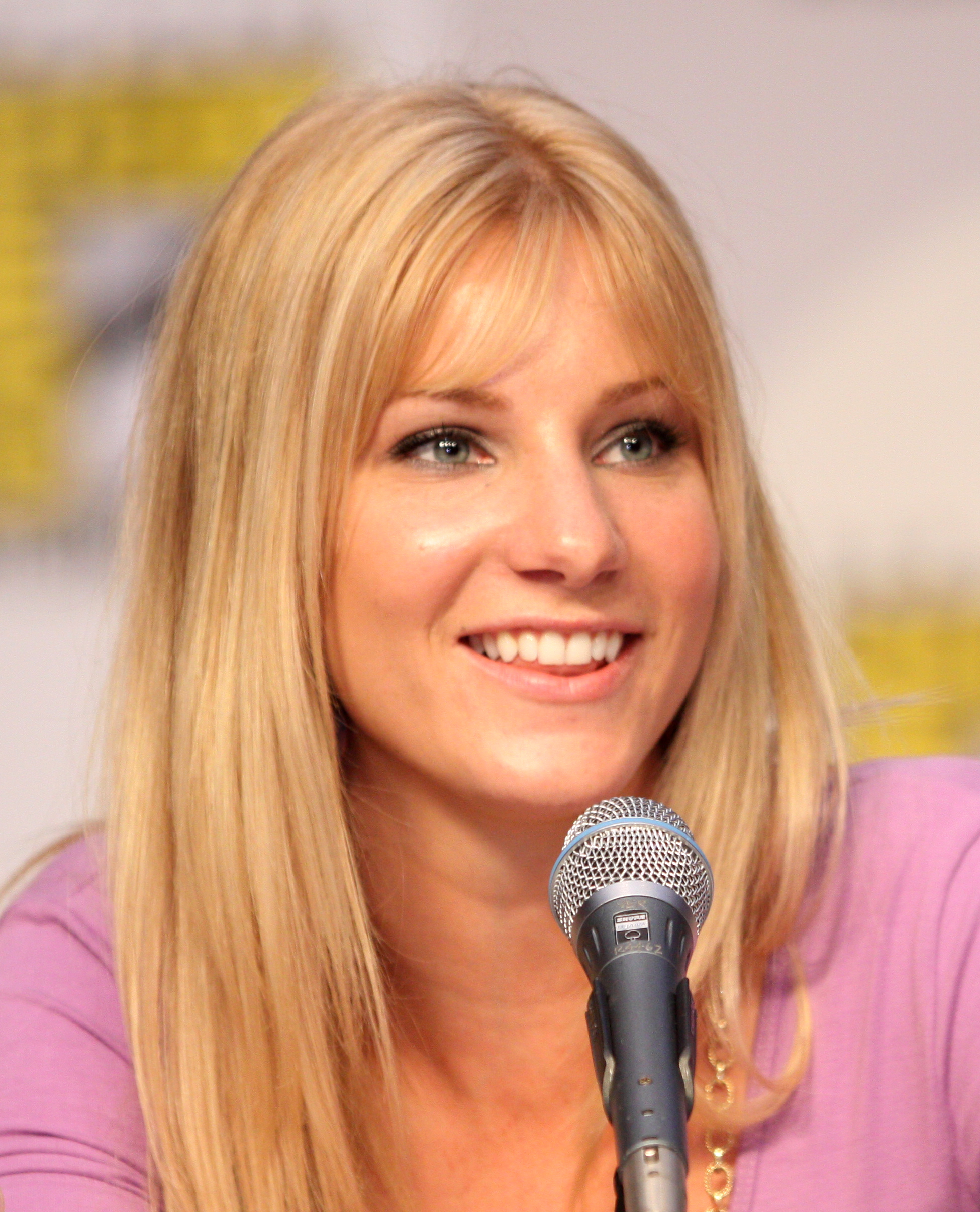
- Morris in 2010
- Born: Heather Elizabeth Morris; Thousand Oaks, California, U.S
- Occupations: Actress; dancer; singer
- Years active: 2006–present
- Spouse: Taylor Hubbell (m. 2015)
- Children: 2

Heather Elizabeth Morris is an American actress, dancer, and singer. She played the role of Brittany S. Pierce in the Fox musical comedy-drama series Glee.

== Early life and education ==
Morris was born in Thousand Oaks, California, and raised in Scottsdale, Arizona. She began dancing in early childhood. Morris competed at a young age in a variety of styles including jazz, tap, and contemporary. Her father died of cancer when she was 14 years old. After graduating from Desert Mountain High School, where she was homecoming queen, Morris spent a year at Arizona State University before moving to Los Angeles to pursue a dance career.

== Career ==
Morris' first significant appearance was in 2006 on So You Think You Can Dance Season 2 where she made it through "Vegas Week" without being cut, but failed to make the final 20 by a vote of 3 to 2.

Not discouraged, Morris actively pursued a career in dancing. Her big break came in 2007 via Beyoncé. Morris was one of Beyoncé's backup dancers on The Beyoncé Experience world tour and, following that, worked again with Beyoncé on a mini "Single Ladies (Put a Ring on It)" promotional tour that included 2008 performances on the American Music Awards, Saturday Night Live, The Ellen DeGeneres Show, Today, and MTV's Total Request Live finale. She also danced backup for Beyoncé and Tina Turner at the 50th Annual Grammy Awards in 2008. She later appeared in a small role in the movie Fired Up, where she met choreographer Zach Woodlee. Following that film, Woodlee brought Morris in to dance on other shows he was choreographing, including episodes of Eli Stone and Swingtown, and the movie Bedtime Stories; eventually, Morris landed a role as Brittany on Glee.

In December 2010, Morris was named the Celebrity Style Ambassador for FLIRT! Cosmetics, an Estee Lauder cosmetics line. In 2010, Morris made the Maxim Hot 100 list, coming in at number 85. On the AfterEllen hot 100 list, she was ranked #2 behind her close friend Naya Rivera.

In 2011, Morris starred in a back-to-school commercial for Staples Canada that featured her dancing.

In the October 2011 issue of Fitness magazine, she stated that she had her breast implants removed. "Implants were something I thought I wanted when I was younger, and now I don't. It was hard being active with them, because my chest was always sore. It hurt a lot, and I didn't like always being in pain, so they had to go!" Her breast implant surgery was done sometime between her time on So You Think You Can Dance at age 18, and age 21 when she was a backup dancer for Beyoncé.

=== Glee ===
Morris was taking acting classes and actively pursuing an acting career when she was asked by Woodlee to teach the choreography for Beyoncé's "Single Ladies" dance to the Glee actors. At the same time, the show was looking for a third cheerleader, and Morris ended up landing the role of Brittany. Initially a background character who hardly ever spoke, the role grew as writers discovered Morris had a gift for delivering one-liners. Jarrett Wieselman of the New York Post opined that Morris had "emerged as one of the funniest second bananas on TV right now" and an LA Times writer mentioned having a "comedy crush on Morris, who plays the galactically dim Glee Club cheerleader Brittany".

When a promotional clip for the episode "Sectionals" indicated that Brittany Pierce and Santana Lopez had slept together, Dorothy Snarker, writing for lesbian entertainment website AfterEllen, praised the pairing, referring to them by the portmanteau "Brittana". Snarker called the two her "new favorite Glee pairing", commenting that: "While Heather Morris (Brittany) and Naya Rivera (Santana) have had minimal screen time, they've made it count. Heather in particular has brought the laughs as the Cheerio least likely to get a Mensa invitation. Never mind Finn and Rachel — I'm on Team Brittana now."

Morris' role became more prominent during the final nine episodes of season one and, due to the overwhelmingly positive response to her character, was promoted to official series regular status during season two. She was at the center of the second episode, "Britney/Brittany" (a tribute to Britney Spears), where she made her singing debut covering Spears' "I'm a Slave 4 U" solo and dueting with Naya Rivera on "Me Against the Music". She later got many other singing and dancing solos. The second half of season two saw Morris' character engage in a lesbian storyline with Rivera's character. The arc and Rivera's and Morris' performances were met with critical acclaim. As on Glee, Morris was best friends in real life with co-star Rivera, until Rivera's death in 2020.

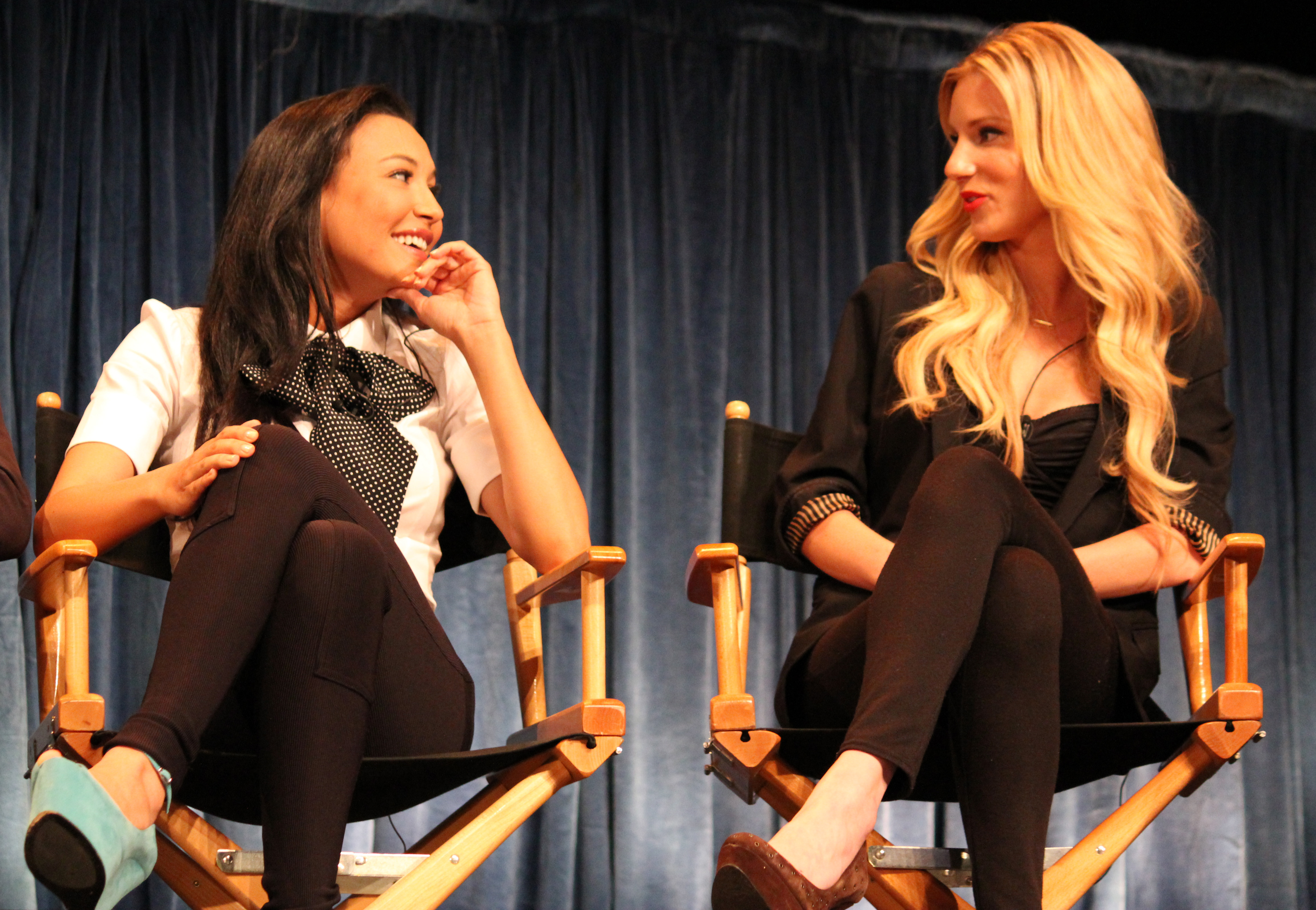
Morris (right) and Naya Rivera at the 2011 PaleyFest event

In season 3, she and Rivera's characters continued their relationship as a couple. Morris had a leading role in the episode "Prom-asaurus". During the season finale, Brittany (played by Morris) revealed that she had an 0.0 GPA and that she would not be graduating.

During the 2011 Glee Tour, Morris performed Britney Spears' song "I'm a Slave 4 U". She also had a dance spotlight with castmate Harry Shum Jr. during Naya Rivera's performance of "Valerie", and was one of the dancers in the "Single Ladies" and "Safety Dance" numbers.

Morris co-wrote and appeared in a January 2011 video for the comedy website Funny or Die, "Nuthin' But A Glee Thang" a parody of "Nuthin' but a 'G' Thang" by Dr. Dre featuring Snoop Dogg. Co-written with actresses Ashley Lendzion and Riki Lindhome, the video features appearances from Modern Family's Sofia Vergara and Morris' Glee castmates Matthew Morrison, Cory Monteith, Harry Shum Jr., and Naya Rivera.

On June 28, 2013, it was reported that Morris would not be returning as a regular on Glee's fifth season. However, Morris reprised her role for the show's hundredth episode and the final episode of the show's fifth season. Morris also appeared in five episodes in the show's sixth and final season, including the series finale.

=== Dancing with the Stars, The Masked Dancer ===
On March 1, 2017, Morris was revealed as one of the contestants who would compete on season 24 of Dancing with the Stars, causing massive criticism, with many citing her professional dancing experience as an unfair advantage. The producers defended their decision to cast Morris by saying that she does not have ballroom or partnering experience. She was paired with professional dancer Maksim Chmerkovskiy, though she danced with troupe member Alan Bersten starting on the second until the fifth week of the competition due to Maks suffering a calf muscle injury. Maks reunited with her to dance in the sixth week of the competition on April 24, 2017, but they were eliminated despite receiving the first perfect score of the season and topping the results board, causing fans to boo loudly.

On October 22, 2022, Morris was revealed to be the winner of the second and final season of The Masked Dancer. She participated in the show under the character of "Scissors". Due to the show being cancelled in 2024, she was the last ever celebrity to be unmasked on the show, and closed the entire show, the final, and its final season by dancing unmasked to "Respect" by Aretha Franklin, which marked the show's final performance in whole.

=== HEAT Faculty ===
Morris joined the HEAT Convention and Competition Faculty in 2020. Morris teaches master classes and serves as a judge.

== Personal life ==
Morris married Taylor Hubbell on May 16, 2015. They began dating when he was a college baseball player, having formerly attended the same high school in Arizona, though they did not know each other there. They began dating after Morris moved to Los Angeles and Hubbell contacted her on Myspace. In a 2011 interview with Fitness, Morris said of Hubbell, "I want to marry him so bad. That's what I really care about. I want to marry Taylor and have kids with him. I love acting, but if it affects my relationship, then I won't continue doing it." After graduating from the University of Louisiana in Lafayette, Hubbell began living with Morris in Los Angeles in early 2012. They have two sons.

== Filmography ==
=== Film ===
| Year | Title | Role | Notes |
|---|---|---|---|
| 2007 | The Beyoncé Experience Live | Dancer | Concert film Supporting role |
| 2008 | Bedtime Stories | Dancer | Supporting role |
| 2009 | Fired Up! | Fiona | Supporting role |
| 2011 | A Sense of Humor | Laura | Short film Lead role |
| 2011 | The Elevator | Girl | Short film; also writer, director and producer |
| 2011 | Andy Made a Friend | Kate | Short film lead role |
| 2011 | Post | Lily | |
| 2011 | Glee: The 3D Concert Movie | Brittany S. Pierce | Concert film main role |
| 2012 | Courage to Create | Bella | Short film Main role |
| 2012 | Ice Age: Continental Drift | Katie | Voice role |
| 2013 | Spring Breakers | Bess | Supporting role |
| 2015 | Horrible Parents | Meg | Short film Lead role |
| 2015 | Most Likely to Die | Gaby (Gabriella) | Lead role |
| 2016 | Folk Hero & Funny Guy | Nicole | Main role |
| 2016 | The Cleansing Hour | Heather | Short film |
| 2017 | Romantically Speaking | Ariel | Main role |
| 2018 | All Styles | Elizabeth | |
| 2019 | Dance with a Demon | Mother | Short film |
| 2019 | Santa Fake | Emily | |
| 2022 | Moon Manor | Karen | |
| 2023 | Cora Bora | | |
| TBA | A.I. Heart U | | |

=== Television ===
| Year | Title | Role | Notes |
|---|---|---|---|
| 2008 | Saturday Night Live | Beyonce's Dancer | Episode: "Paul Rudd/Beyoncé" |
| 2008 | Swingtown | Disco Dancer | Uncredited, episode: "Get Down Tonight" |
| 2008 | Eli Stone | Dancer | Uncredited, 2 episodes |
| 2009–2015 | Glee | Brittany Pierce | Main role (seasons 2-4); Recurring role (seasons 1, 5-6); 92 episodes |
| 2010 | How I Met Your Mother | Suit Dancer | Uncredited, episode: "Girls Versus Suits" |
| 2012 | Punk'd | Herself | Guest host |
| 2015 | Romantically Speaking | Ariel Cookson | Television film |
| 2015 | Whose Line Is It Anyway? | Herself | Episode: "Heather Morris" |
| 2015 | Comedy Bang! Bang! | Eliza Hansenback | Episode: "Weird Al Yankovic Wears A Different Hawaiian Shirt" |
| 2016 | Go-Go Boy Interrupted | Katie | 3 episodes |
| 2016 | LA LA Living | Lizbet | Main role |
| 2017 | Dancing with the Stars | Herself | Contestant on season 24 |
| 2017 | GLOW | Member of aerobics class | Uncredited; episode: Pilot |
| 2017 | Psycho Wedding Crasher | Jenna Kravitz | TV movie lead role |
| 2017 | Mondays | Kia | Episode: "That Time When I Got Life Coached" |
| 2018 | I.R.L. | Lizbet | Main role |
| 2018 | The Troupe | Kennedy Dawson | Main role |
| 2018 | Raven's Home | Lady | Cameo, episode "Raven's Home: Remix" |
| 2018 | Pretty Little Stalker | Kelsey | TV movie lead role |
| 2022 | Fatal Fandom | Addison Bright | Television film |
| 2022 | The Masked Dancer | Scissors | Winner, series 2 |
| 2024 | So Help Me Todd | Judy Maxon | Recurring cast (season 2) |

=== Music videos ===
| Year | Artist | Song |
|---|---|---|
| 2009 | The White Tie Affair | "Allow Me To Introduce Myself...Mr. Right/Candle (Sick And Tired)" |
| 2009 | Hit the Lights | "Drop the Girl" |
| 2011 | Leo Moctezuma | "2 Da Left" |
| 2021 | Whitney Houston and Clean Bandit | "How Will I Know" |

== Awards and nominations ==
| Year | Award | Category | Work | Result |
|---|---|---|---|---|
| 2010 | Screen Actors Guild Awards | Outstanding Performance by an Ensemble in a Comedy Series | Glee | Won |
| 2010 | TV Land Awards | Future Classics (with: Glee Cast) | Glee | Won |
| 2010 | Teen Choice Awards | Choice Music: Group (with: Glee Cast) | Glee | Nominated |
| 2010 | Lesbian/Bi People's Choice Awards | Favorite Music Duo or Group (with: Glee Cast) | Glee | Nominated |
| 2010 | Gay People's Choice Awards | Favorite Music Duo or Group (with: Glee Cast) | Glee | Won |
| 2011 | Screen Actors Guild Awards | Outstanding Performance by an Ensemble in a Comedy Series | Glee | Nominated |
| 2011 | Grammy Awards | Best Compilation Soundtrack for Visual Media | Glee | Nominated |
| 2011 | Grammy Awards | Best Pop Performance by a Duo or Group with Vocals | "Don't Stop Believin' (Regionals Version)" | Nominated |
| 2011 | Teen Choice Awards | Choice Music: Group (with: Glee Cast) | Glee | Nominated |
| 2012 | Screen Actors Guild Awards | Outstanding Performance by an Ensemble in a Comedy Series | Glee | Nominated |
| 2012 | Grammy Awards | Best Compilation Soundtrack for Visual Media (with: Glee Cast) | Glee | Nominated |
| 2013 | Screen Actors Guild Awards | Outstanding Performance by an Ensemble in a Comedy Series | Glee | Nominated |
| 2013 | Teen Choice Awards | Scene Stealer Female | Glee | Nominated |
