= A Chorus Line (film) =

1985 film by Richard Attenborough

- Theatrical release poster
- Directed by: Richard Attenborough
- Screenplay by: Arnold Schulman
- Based on: A Chorus Line by James Kirkwood Jr. and Nicholas Dante
- Produced by: Cy Feuer; Ernest H. Martin
- Starring: Michael Douglas
- Cinematography: Ronnie Taylor
- Edited by: John Bloom
- Music by: Marvin Hamlisch; Edward Kleban
- Production companies: Embassy Films Associates; PolyGram Pictures
- Distributed by: Columbia Pictures
- Release date: December 9, 1985 (New York)
- Running time: 118 minutes
- Country: United States
- Language: English
- Budget: $25 million
- Box office: $14.2 million

A Chorus Line is a 1985 American musical drama film directed by Richard Attenborough, and starring Michael Douglas and Terrence Mann. The screenplay by Arnold Schulman is based on the book of the 1975 stage musical by James Kirkwood Jr. and Nicholas Dante. The songs were composed by Marvin Hamlisch and Edward Kleban. The plot centers on a group of dancers auditioning for a part in a new Broadway musical.

Released theatrically by Columbia Pictures on December 9, 1985, the film received mixed reviews from critics and grossed $14.2 million.

== Plot ==
In a Broadway theater, from a darkened place in the audience, director Zach judges dozens of dancers and their performances. After initial eliminations, sixteen hopefuls remain. Arriving late is former lead dancer Cassie, who once had a tempestuous romantic relationship with Zach but left him for Hollywood. Now she has not worked in over a year, and is desperate enough to be part of the chorus line.

Zach is looking for eight dancers (four men and four women) and has them introduce themselves. As they each step forward, he interviews them and coaxes the dancers into talking about a variety of topics. This includes how they began dancing, first sexual experiences, their families, and hardships they have faced. Through their stories, the group reveals how being a performer is a difficult profession.

As Cassie enters the stage, Zach tells his assistant Larry to take all the dancers to a rehearsal room. Cassie pleads to continue the audition. Zach relents and sends her to learn the routine with everyone else. Paul re-enters the stage and tells Zach about how he was sexually molested as a child while watching musicals on 42nd Street. Paul describes his first job at a drag cabaret. When his parents found out that he was gay and performing in drag, they could not look him in the eye. Zach embraces Paul, showing compassion for the first time in the audition.

Larry brings the dancers back onstage to perform the newly learned routine. Zach shouts at Cassie, as she cannot blend in. They argue about their past romantic relationship while Larry leads the group in a tap combination. Suddenly, Paul slips, falls and injures his knee. As he is rushed to the hospital, Zach asks the dancers what they will do once they can no longer perform. Diana is the only one that can truly answer the question, telling him that she wants to be remembered, even just for dancing in a chorus, which all the hopefuls seem to agree with. Zach chooses Val, Cassie, Bebe, Diana, Mike, Mark, Richie, and Bobby to be in his line.

Months later, the eight dancers − now dressed in identical costumes − perform "One" in front of an audience. As the song progresses, the ones who were cut during auditions also join the show and the dancers' reflections begin to emerge from the mirrored stage backdrop. The song's tag vamps as the stage fills with dozens of dancers, who arrange themselves into a series of kicklines.

== Cast ==
- Michael Douglas as Zach, choreographer
- Alyson Reed as Cassie
- Terrence Mann as Larry, assistant choreographer
- Sharon Brown as Kim, Zach's secretary

Dancers

- Michael Blevins as Mark Tobori
- Yamil Borges as Diana Morales
- Jan Gan Boyd as Connie Wong
- Gregg Burge as Richie Walters
- Cameron English as Paul San Marco
- Tony Fields as Al DeLuca
- Audrey Landers as Val Clarke
- Nicole Fosse as Kristine Evelyn Erlich-DeLuca
- Vicki Frederick as Sheila Bryant
- Michelle Johnston as Beatrice Ann "Bebe" Benson
- Janet Jones as Judy Monroe
- Pam Klinger as Maggie Winslow
- Charles McGowan as Mike Cass
- Justin Ross as Greg Gardner
- Blane Savage as Don Kerr
- Matt West as Bobby Mills

== Musical numbers ==
1. "I Hope I Get It" - Entire cast
2. "Who Am I Anyway?" - Paul
3. "I Can Do That" – Mike
4. "At the Ballet" – Sheila, Bebe, and Maggie
5. "Surprise, Surprise" – Richie and dancers (replaces "Hello Twelve, Hello Thirteen, Hello Love")
6. "Nothing" - Diana
7. "Dance: Ten; Looks: Three" – Val
8. "Let Me Dance for You" – Cassie (replaces "The Music and the Mirror")
9. "One" (rehearsal) – entire cast
10. "What I Did for Love" – Cassie (In the stage version, the company performs the number, with Diana leading)
11. "One" (Finale) - Entire cast

The songs "And...", “Sing!”, "Mother", "Gimme the Ball", and "The Tap Combination" from the stage version are eliminated.

=== Charts ===
Chart (1986)	Peak position
Australia (Kent Music Report)	100

== Production ==
=== Development ===
Even before the show had premiered on Broadway, Hollywood producers had expressed interest in a motion picture version of the musical. Universal Pictures acquired the rights for $5.5 million, in addition to agreeing to pay royalties of 20% of the distributor's gross rentals above $30 million, with the stage musical's director Michael Bennett hired as producer and director. Bennett declined to participate when his proposal to present the film as an audition to cast the movie version of the stage play instead of a literal translation of the play (cf. the 1971 film adaptation of The Boy Friend) was rejected.

Many directors turned down the project, insisting that not only was A Chorus Line too beloved, but it would not translate well to the screen. In addition, the requirement to start paying royalties after the gross reached $30 million—by which time the film might not yet have broken even—made the film a difficult financial prospect. When Attenborough accepted the project in 1984, there was some apprehension as to the treatment the British director would give the musical's quintessentially American story.

Universal sold the rights to PolyGram for $7.8 million in 1982 and in 1983 Embassy Pictures joined as co-producers, investing 20% in Embassy Film Associates, which financed the picture.

Arnold Schulman later said "for years, writer after writer tried to find a way to turn the musical into a movie, and nobody could. Finally, I came up with a surrealistic approach that [the producers] Norman Lear and Jerry Perenchio must have liked, because they put up twenty-four million dollars of their own money to make it. Richard Attenborough must have liked it, because he agreed to direct it; but for reasons known only to him, Attenborough threw away the script completely and tried to photograph the play."

=== Casting ===
In February 1984, according to Attenborough, the singer Madonna auditioned at the Royale Theatre on Broadway for a dance role in the movie using her birth name of Ciccone. He rejected her.

The dance numbers were choreographed by Jeffrey Hornaday.

Matt West, Vicki Frederick, Pam Klinger, Justin Ross, and Alyson Reed had all appeared in A Chorus Line on Broadway or in other major productions of the stage show prior to appearing in the film version. Gregg Burge, Charles McGowan, and Blane Savage joined stage productions of A Chorus Line after filming the movie.

Audrey Landers could move well but was not a trained dancer as was the rest of the cast. Attenborough cast her in the film despite her lack of formal dance training. She is absent from some of the more difficult choreographed dance numbers.

=== Production ===
The decision to tamper with the score disappointed fans of the show. "Hello Twelve, Hello Thirteen, Hello Love" and "The Music and the Mirror" were replaced by new songs, "Surprise, Surprise" and "Let Me Dance for You", whereas "And...", "Sing!", "Mother", and "Gimme the Ball" were deleted entirely. "What I Did for Love," the show's breakout tune, originally was performed by Diana leading the company as a paean to dancers and their dedication to their craft, but in the film it is a wistful love song by Cassie about Zach as she leaves the stage. Another change from the stage show is Bebe being selected at the end rather than Judy.

The stage musical was one of the early productions to address the subject of gay actors within the theatre. However, the film version opted instead to make a more "family friendly" film by dealing less with the experiences of gay actors.

Six months before release, Embassy Pictures was sold to The Coca-Cola Company, which also owned Columbia Pictures. Five months later, Dino DeLaurentiis acquired Embassy but he did not acquire the 20% interest in Embassy Film Associates, which created some confusion over who would handle the film, which was scheduled to be distributed by Columbia.

Arnold Schulman said "after Lear and Perenchio put up the money and the picture was being made, they sold their company to Columbia, and Columbia wanted nothing to do with A Chorus Line. So every single element was fighting with every other element, and all the pressure landed on Attenborough. Columbia versus Embassy versus the two producers; everybody disagreeing with each other about the casting, this and that, about everything. How Attenborough survived it, I have no idea, but he is the most decent man in the world, a truly warm, intelligent, beautiful human being."

== Release ==
The film opened on December 9, 1985, on 15 screens in New York and then opened on 4 screens in Los Angeles 2 days later. It grossed $306,509 in its first 6 days of release from the 19 screens.

== Reception ==
=== Critical response ===
In his review in The New York Times, Vincent Canby observed "Though it was generally agreed that Hair would not work as a film, Miloš Forman transformed it into one of the most original pieces of musical cinema of the last 20 years. Then they said that A Chorus Line couldn't be done — and this time they were right [...] Mr. Attenborough has elected to make a more or less straightforward film version that is fatally halfhearted."

Roger Ebert of the Chicago Sun-Times stated "The result may not please purists who want a film record of what they saw on stage, but this is one of the most intelligent and compelling movie musicals in a long time — and the most grown up, since it isn't limited, as so many contemporary musicals are, to the celebration of the survival qualities of geriatric actresses."

Variety wrote "Chorus often seems static and confined, rarely venturing beyond the immediate. Attenborough merely films the stage show as best he could. Nonetheless, the director and lenser Ronnie Taylor have done an excellent job working within the limitations, using every trick they could think of to keep the picture moving. More importantly, they have a fine cast, good music and a great, popular show to work with. So if all they did was get it on film, that's not so bad."

Time Out London wrote "The grit and drive of the original have been dissipated into studiously unkempt glitz as empty as plasticised pop [...] It's too corny and unbelievable for words."

Kelly Bishop, the original stage Sheila, noted "It was appalling when director Richard Attenborough went on a talk show and said 'this is a story about kids trying to break into show business.' I almost tossed my TV out the window; I mean what an idiot! It's about veteran dancers looking for one last job before it's too late for them to dance anymore. No wonder the film sucked!"

On Rotten Tomatoes, the film has an approval rating of 48%, based on reviews from 44 critics. The website's critics consensus states: "On stage, A Chorus Line pulled back the curtain to reveal the hopes and fears of showbiz strivers, but that energy and urgency is lost in the transition to the big screen." On Metacritic, the film has a score of 46% based on reviews from 13 critics, indicating "mixed or average" reviews.

=== Accolades ===
Award	Category	Nominee(s)	Result
Academy Awards	Best Film Editing	John Bloom	Nominated
Academy Awards	Best Original Song	"Surprise Surprise"; Music by Marvin Hamlisch; Lyrics by Edward Kleban	Nominated
Academy Awards	Best Sound	Donald O. Mitchell, Michael Minkler, Gerry Humphreys and Chris Newman	Nominated
British Academy Film Awards	Best Editing	John Bloom	Nominated
British Academy Film Awards	Best Sound	Jonathan Bates, Chris Newman and Gerry Humphreys	Nominated
Golden Globe Awards	Best Motion Picture – Musical or Comedy		Nominated
Golden Globe Awards	Best Director – Motion Picture	Richard Attenborough	Nominated
Japan Academy Film Prize	Outstanding Foreign Language Film		Nominated

== Home media ==
A Chorus Line was released to DVD by MGM Home Entertainment on April 15, 2003, as a Region 1 widescreen DVD, with a re-release in new packaging on January 14, 2014, and a Blu-ray release on the same date.
