= A Chorus Line (original cast recording) =

A Chorus Line: Original Cast Recording

Cast recording by the original cast
- Released: 1975
- Recorded: 1975
- Genre: Show tunes
- Length: 48.04
- Label: Columbia Masterworks

Professional ratings
Review scores
Source	Rating
AllMusic	5/5 stars

A Chorus Line, subtitled Original Cast Recording, is an album containing a recording of the 1975 musical A Chorus Line made by its original Broadway cast. The album was released in the same year by Columbia.

The album peaked at number 98 on the U.S. Billboard Top LPs & Tape chart.

== Track listing ==
LP (Columbia Masterworks PS 33581)

Side 1
No.	Title	Artist(s)	Length
1.	"I Hope I Get It"	Company	4:58
2.	"I Can Do That"	Cilento	1:32
3.	"At the Ballet"	Bishop, Lane, Cole	5:53
4.	"Sing!"	Baughman, Percassi	1:51
5.	"Hello Twelve, Hello Thirteen, Hello Love" (Montage)	Company	6:45
6.	"Nothing"	Lopez	4:19

Side 2
No.	Title	Artist(s)	Length
1.	"The Music and the Mirror"	McKechnie	6:38
2.	"Dance: Ten; Looks: Three"	Blair	2:51
3.	"One"	Company	4:46
4.	"What I Did for Love"	Lopez and Company	3:45
5.	"One" (Reprise) – "Finale"	Company	5:02

== Charts ==
Chart (1975)	Peak position
US Billboard Top LPs & Tape	98

== Certifications ==
Region	Certification	Certified units/sales
United States (RIAA)	2× Platinum	2,000,000^{^}
^{^} Shipments figures based on certification alone.

== Awards ==
Year	Award type	Categories	Results	Ref.
1976	Grammy Awards	Best Cast Show Album	Nominated	
