= Duets (Glee) =

- Glee episode
- Episode no.: Season 2 Episode 4
- Directed by: Eric Stoltz
- Written by: Ian Brennan
- Production code: 2ARC04
- Original air date: October 12, 2010

Guest appearances
- Harry Shum, Jr. as Mike Chang; Chord Overstreet as Sam Evans; Max Adler as Dave Karofsky; James Earl as Azimio

Episode chronology
← Previous "Grilled Cheesus"	Next → "The Rocky Horror Glee Show"
- Glee season 2

"Duets" is the fourth episode of the second season of the American television series Glee, and the twenty-sixth episode overall. It was written by series creator Ian Brennan, directed by Eric Stoltz, and premiered on Fox on October 12, 2010. The episode featured seven cover versions, including a mash-up of "Happy Days Are Here Again" and "Get Happy" by Barbra Streisand and Judy Garland, respectively.

In the episode, transfer student Sam Evans (Chord Overstreet) joins the glee club. Director Will Schuester (Matthew Morrison) assigns the members to perform a duet with another classmate, and offers a prize for the best performance. The students form their duos and begin practicing, testing several relationships and initiating others; after first being recruited by Kurt Hummel (Chris Colfer), Sam ultimately finds himself partnered with Quinn Fabray (Dianna Agron).

"Duets" received generally positive reviews from critics, and many praised the show for its character development and varied song choices. The episode also featured a neck-nuzzle between Santana (Naya Rivera) and Brittany (Heather Morris), which was a subject of interest to many critics and led Christie Keith of AfterEllen.com to refer to the episode as "queerest episode of any series that's ever been on television". In its original broadcast, "Duets" was watched by 11.36 million American viewers. It was the top-rated program of the night in the 18–49 demographic, attaining a 4.7/13 Nielsen rating/share. Both viewership and ratings rose from the previous episode, "Grilled Cheesus".

== Plot ==
Glee club director Will Schuester (Matthew Morrison) announces a duets assignment and competition; the prize for the winning duo is dinner at Breadstix. He tells them that club member Puck (Mark Salling) has been sent to juvenile detention for stealing an ATM, and introduces a new member, Sam Evans (Chord Overstreet). Kurt (Chris Colfer) suspects that Sam is gay and asks him to be his duet partner; Sam agrees. Club co-captain Finn Hudson (Cory Monteith) separately attempts to convince them not to be partners, as he fears that Sam will be bullied to the point of quitting if he sings a duet with another guy, but Sam insists on honoring his given word to Kurt, and Kurt is still angry at Finn for some homophobic comments he made when they were roommates. (Note: This occurred in the season one episode "Theatricality".) After his father Burt (Mike O'Malley) points out that just as Kurt had a crush on Finn the year before, he may now be taking advantage of Sam, Kurt releases Sam from their partnership, and as his competition entry sings "Le Jazz Hot!" from Victor Victoria in a "duet" with himself. Kurt comes away from this feeling lonelier than ever and wonders if he will ever truly be accepted for who he is by his peers and family and withdraws from everyone else in the group.

Cheerleaders Santana (Naya Rivera) and Brittany (Heather Morris) make out, but when Brittany suggests they sing Melissa Etheridge's "Come to My Window" together, Santana refuses and trivializes their relationship. Santana believes her best chance of winning is by partnering with Mercedes (Amber Riley), and together they sing "River Deep – Mountain High". Brittany pairs up with Artie (Kevin McHale), and they start dating. Artie loses his virginity to Brittany who carried him to bed, but before they compete Santana tells him that Brittany only wanted him for his voice so she could win the competition. He is deeply upset that his first sexual experience was the consequence of such petty motivations, so he breaks up with Brittany and dissolves their partnership. Tina (Jenna Ushkowitz) and her boyfriend Mike (Harry Shum, Jr.) argue about whether they should duet at all, but he ultimately agrees to join her on "Sing!" from A Chorus Line, his first solo performance for glee club; their duet draws praise from Will.

Finn and his girlfriend Rachel Berry (Lea Michele) initially practice singing "Don't Go Breaking My Heart", but Rachel suggests they should throw the competition so Sam can win, to make him more likely to stay in the glee club. When Sam has a slushee thrown in his face by Dave Karofsky (Max Adler) and Azimio (James Earl), Quinn (Dianna Agron) helps him to clean up. They subsequently become duet partners, and during a rehearsal he attempts to kiss her. Quinn is upset and tells him they cannot sing together, but she is later convinced to reconsider by Rachel. Rachel and Finn, dressed as a schoolgirl and a priest in an intentionally offensive move to damage their chances of victory, perform "With You I'm Born Again" by Billy Preston and Syreeta Wright. Sam and Quinn sing "Lucky" by Jason Mraz and Colbie Caillat. The club members all vote for themselves except Finn and Rachel, who vote for the winners, Sam and Quinn. Over the victory dinner at Breadstix they form a bond, and Quinn tells Sam that she considers the meal their first date. The episode ends with Brittany (Heather Morris) sitting by herself leaning her nose against the meatball as seen in Lady and the Tramp wishing she has a partner by her side like Santana or Artie whom she ended up hurting.

Noticing that Kurt is lonely and acting more withdrawn, Rachel tells him how much the club members value and accept him and asks him to duet with her for fun now that the competition is over in an act of solidarity. The episode ends with them singing the Judy Garland/Barbra Streisand mash-up of "Happy Days Are Here Again" and "Get Happy" for the glee club.

== Production ==
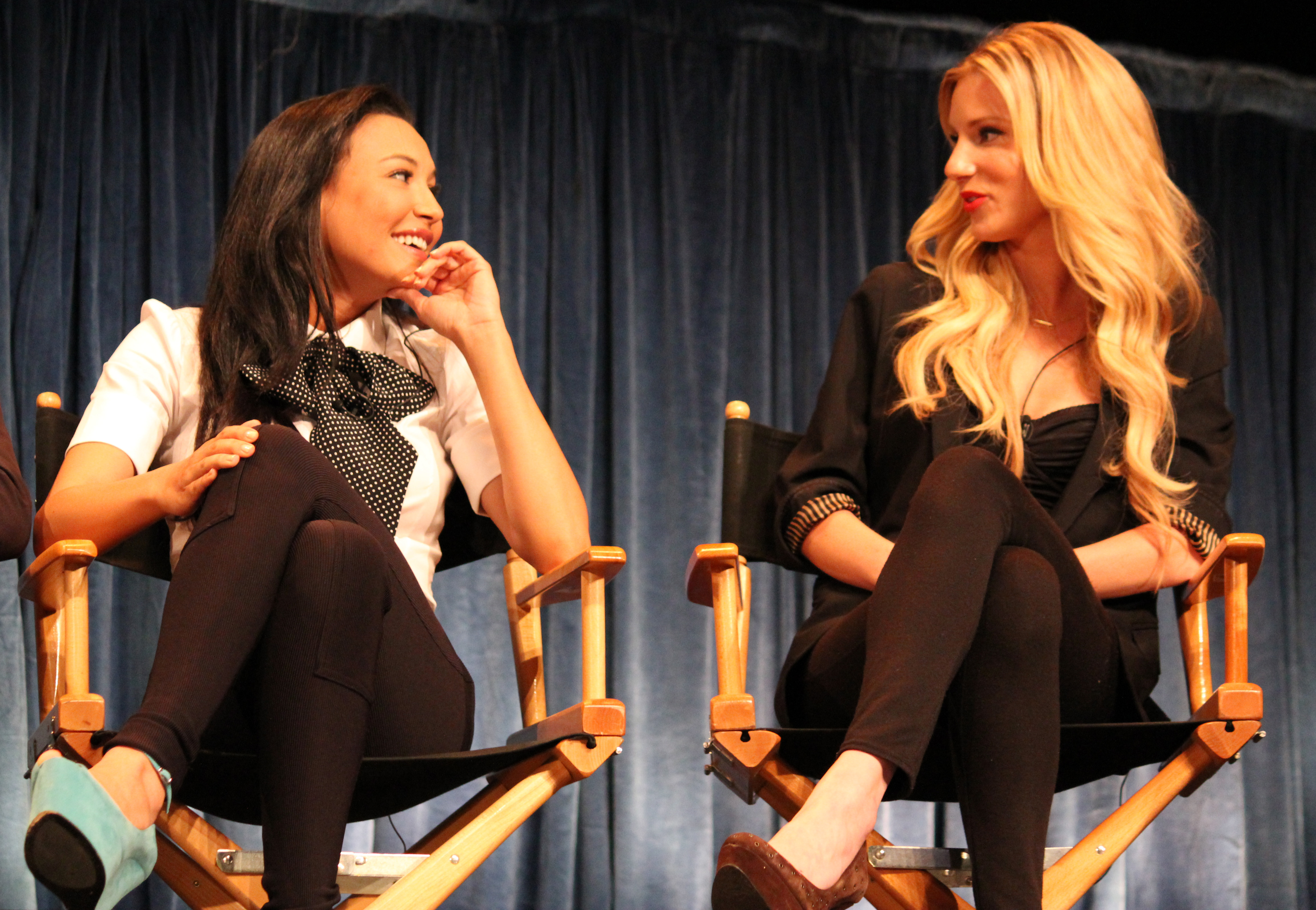
"Duets" develops the relationship between Santana (Naya Rivera, left) and Brittany (Heather Morris, right).

In "Duets", Brittany and Santana are shown together in bed. A physical relationship between the two was first alluded to in the season one episode "Sectionals". Rivera sought clarification on the nature of their relationship from "Sectionals" director Brad Falchuk, who informed her that the two characters had been intimate in the past. Series creator Ryan Murphy told Morris that as Glee is a primetime series, he did not want to show them making out. Interviewed by Brett Berk of Vanity Fair in May 2010, Morris stated that Brittany and Santana were simply best friends, and the show would not be taking them in a "friends with benefits" direction. However, at the Television Critics Association Summer Press Tour in August 2010, Murphy stated that the characters would in fact kiss on screen in an upcoming episode. Falchuk later explained that the Brittany/Santana storyline had begun "almost as a goof at first", however "then we realised this show is so inclusive, and then there were people we weren't representative of. This whole lesbian-bisexual female community. We're fortunate the network wasn't resistant of it and let us try it out, then it became something much deeper." In "Duets", Brittany also had a brief relationship with Artie. Morris told Jarett Wieselman of the New York Post that she is a fan of McHale's, and had been pressing Murphy to give their characters a storyline together since the beginning of the season.

Series regular Mark Salling did not appear in "Duets", which prompted media speculation that he would not return to the show due to a breach of contract. However, his absence was for creative reasons, as it allowed Sam to establish himself within the glee club and begin a relationship with Puck's ex-girlfriend Quinn. Overstreet stated that Sam was initially created as a romantic interest for Kurt, but his storyline was adjusted to pair him with Quinn as a result of the chemistry the producers detected between himself and Agron.

The episode featured cover versions of seven songs: Ike & Tina Turner's "River Deep – Mountain High", Jason Mraz and Colbie Caillat's "Lucky", Elton John and Kiki Dee's "Don't Go Breaking My Heart", "Le Jazz Hot!" from Victor Victoria, "Sing!" from A Chorus Line—which was Shum's first lead vocal performance on the series, Billy Preston and Syreeta Wright's "With You I'm Born Again", and a mash-up of "Happy Days Are Here Again" and "Get Happy" as performed by Judy Garland and Barbra Streisand. Colfer and Michele's costumes and positions in the latter number matched those in the Garland and Streisand original. Although it was not performed, Melissa Etheridge's "Come to My Window" was suggested as a performance piece by Brittany; five months prior to the episode's broadcast, Etheridge had jested that her songs were not "gay enough" for use on Glee. All of the songs except "With You I'm Born Again" were released as singles, available for download. "River Deep – Mountain High" and "Lucky" were also featured on the fifth soundtrack album of the series, Glee: The Music, Volume 4, while "Don't Go Breaking My Heart" was included on the fourth extended play, Glee: The Music, Love Songs.

== Reception ==
=== Ratings ===
In its original broadcast, "Duets" was watched by 11.36 million American viewers. It was the top-rated program of the night in the 18–49 demographic, as it attained a 4.7/13 Nielsen rating/share. Both viewership and ratings rose from the previous episode, "Grilled Cheesus", which was watched by 11.20 million viewers and attained a 4.6/13 rating/share among adults 18–49. In the weekly program rankings, Glee was the fourth most-viewed show among adults 18–49, and the second scripted show behind only Modern Family. In overall viewers, it placed nineteenth for the week. In Canada, the episode was watched by 2.25 million viewers, which placed it at seventh for the week. Viewership again rose from the previous episode, which was watched by 1.99 million viewers and ranked eleventh. In Australia, "Duets" drew 1.04 million viewers, making Glee the ninth most-viewed show of the night and twenty-eighth of the week. It was also up from "Grilled Cheesus", which attracted 1.02 million viewers and ranked eleventh on the night, and thirty-second for the week. In the UK, the episode was watched by 2.51 million viewers (2.11 million on E4, and 397,000 on E4+1), which made it the most-watched show on E4 and E4+1 for the week, and the second most-watched show on cable for the week.

=== Critical response ===
"You know how, in a perfectly sung duet, the two voices ebb and flow and twist and blend and play and lift in a way that makes a wonderfully pure whole? That's sort of what Tuesday night's episode of Glee felt like to me. The plot and the music were in perfect balance. No one was being pushed out of character by some tacked-on theme, facing the trauma of a dying parent, or tackling deep issues about the presence of a deity. Every member of the choir was given a storyline and a voice."

— Amy Reiter of the Los Angeles Times on "Duets"

"Duets" was generally well received by critics, many of whom contrasted it favorably with the preceding season two episodes. (Note: These critics included: Jarett Wieselman, New York Post: "After three somewhat underwhelming episodes, Glee hit a major high note with last night's 'Duets.'"; Lisa Respers France, CNN: "Shout hallelujah, come on and get happy, because Glee is back to awesome! I've made no secret of the fact that I wasn't super thrilled by the last two Glee episodes, but on Tuesday night I was reminded why I love this show so much."; Damian Holbrook, TV Guide: "For the second week in a row, the Tuesday night treat that was rapidly going from a hit to a 'huh?' nailed it with an episode that had—wait for it—actual plot."; Robert Canning, IGN: "After several weeks of 'event' television and some hit-and-miss drama, Glee finally found its groove with 'Duets.'") The New York Times's Rebecca Milzoff called it the best of the season to that point "in terms of old-school Glee", and indeed, both Lisa Respers France of CNN and Jarett Wieselman of the New York Post found it a reminder of why they originally loved the show. Raymund Flandez of The Wall Street Journal summarized: "This was a return to that honeymoon feeling, when Glee first surprised, scandalized and satisfied you." TV Guide's Damian Holbrook and the Houston Chronicle's Bobby Hankinson appreciated the lack of gimmicks; the former explained "No Britney numbers. No forced guest stars. No reasons to check out. It's amazing how satisfying a show can be when the characters we invested in a year ago get to do something more than set-dress a stunt." James Poniewozik of Time labelled it "easily the strongest character episode so far this season". While The Atlantic's Kevin Fallon opined that the series finally achieved the correct "tonal balance of comedy and drama", his colleague Meghan Brown provided one of few dissenting reviews; she called it a lazy, nonsensical episode which contributed to a building "sophomore slump". MTV's Aly Semigran found it lackluster after "Grilled Cheesus", and although Anthony Benigno of the Daily News deemed it an improvement on the previous episode, he concluded that it was not one of the season's best.

Several themes ran through the reviews, one of which was the lack of focus on adult characters. IGN's Robert Canning—who rated "Duets" 8.5/10, signifying a great episode—felt that this contributed to its success, as it "allowed for small but interesting character development to take place, even with some of the minor characters." Emily VanDerWerff of The A.V. Club was surprised that she did not miss the presence of cheerleading coach Sue Sylvester, but Hankinson, Semigran and Rolling Stone's Erica Futterman all lamented her absence. The gay-centered storylines also attracted much commentary. Christie Keith of lesbian and bisexual media website AfterEllen.com suggested that "Duets" was "the queerest episode of any series that's ever been on television". Entertainment Weekly's Tim Stack wrote that Kurt "stole the show in terms of pure emotional power" and called him "the most important character on television right now". USA Today's Ann Oldenburg questioned whether Glee had gone "too far" by depicting a physical relationship between Santana and Brittany. Several reviewers appreciated the resultant development of Brittany's character: Poniewozik enjoyed the exploration of her "basic loneliness", E! Online's Jenna Mullins was pleased to see more than her usual "deadpanning and one-liners", and Wieselman called it a "wonderful moment" when she and Artie broke up, which led to the depiction of "real feelings" in Brittany for the first time. Canning found Brittany and Artie's coupling "uneven" and preferred her with Santana, as their development made them "uniquely interesting and a blast to watch." VanDerWerff conversely deemed Brittany's pairing with Artie "one of the most resonant things the show's ever done".

The storylines that involved Rachel received mixed commentary. Both Poniewozik and Stack appreciated the pairing of Rachel and Kurt: the former called them "probably the strongest pairing" of the episode due to similarities in their characterization, and the latter lauded Rachel's line "I know you're lonely...but you're not alone" as "an incredibly powerful statement coming in the midst of all these gay youth suicides[, which] further illuminates the relevance and importance of a show like Glee." Fallon said that the episode "added some flavor" to the relationship between Rachel and Finn, which was "in danger of going stale", and Berk noted that "Duets" was the first time he had ever been "marginally compelled" by a storyline which involved the pair. Benigno was far less favorable: he called Rachel a lunatic, and a "self-absorbed crazy woman who will do anything short of black-ops assassination to secure the [Nationals] trophy."

Sam and Quinn's burgeoning relationship met with a fairly positive response. Canning would have preferred for them to become friends first, and Benigno deemed their sexual tension unrealistic, based on Sam's success at charming Quinn in Na'vi, the fictional language of Avatar. However, while Berk declared himself "fully exhausted with the flimsy cheerleader/quarterback paradigm", Sam's Na'vi and Matthew McConaughey impression led him to concede that they are "cute together". Stack and Mullins shared this sentiment, and VanDerWerff called their flirtation "exceptionally well-handled".

=== Music and performances ===
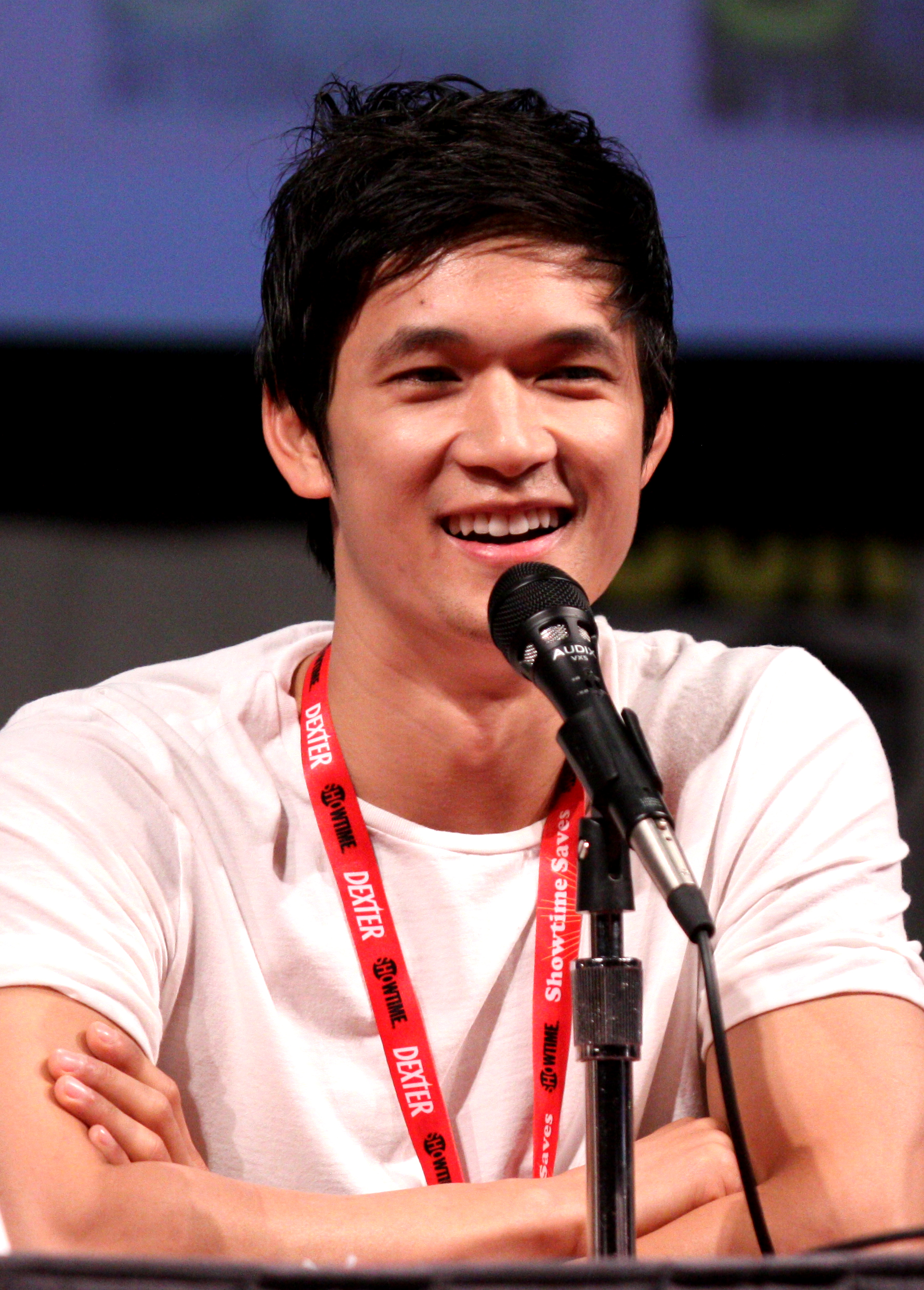
In "Duets", Mike Chang (Harry Shum, Jr., pictured) gives his first featured vocal performance in a musical number.

The episode's musical performances—deemed "among the most varied and terrific in the show's history" by VanDerWerff—were also generally well received. Futterman found it refreshing for the main characters to receive equal performance time. Although Poniewozik opined that some numbers were included based on iTunes sales potential rather than how well they served the plot, Holbrook was pleased that the songs "drove the story instead of drowning out the characters", and both Hankinson and Dave Itzkoff of The New York Times welcomed the contextually appropriate song selection. Opinions were divided over the best performance. Both Futterman and VanDerWerff felt that Mercedes and Santana should have won the duet competition with their performance of "River Deep – Mountain High". The former called it "one of the series' best" duets, and the latter further praised it as potentially "the best musical number the show's ever done from a pure performance standpoint." Wieselman wrote that it was the best song of the episode, and that he "didn't want it to ever end". However, Hankinson highlighted its lack of "emotional punch", and Semigran deemed it her least favorite performance. She and Benigno named "Sing!" as their favorite routine, though Benigno gave it only a "B" grade, as its appeal hinged on Mike's dancing, rather than his vocal performance. Berk gave it four stars out of five, his highest rating of the episode, tied with "River Deep – Mountain High". Though Flandez and Hankinson also commented positively on the song, the former thought that Tina's sung interjections became annoying and the latter called it "far from the best of the evening".

Burns chose "Lucky" as "the most impressive number of the evening", and Respers France called it the most adorable. Semigran and the Los Angeles Times's Amy Reiter agreed that it was cute, and Flandez praised its "charm and simplicity". Stack and Benigno gave it an "A"; Stack eagerly anticipated more duets between Quinn and Sam, and Benigno called it "absolutely fantastic", with particular praise for Agron, who he opined is often overlooked. Though Futterman also noted its charm, she did not think it was a worthy winner of the duets competition. Berk gave it just two stars out of five, as he found it "kind of boring". The mash-up of "Happy Days Are Here Again" and "Get Happy" was widely acclaimed. Respers France, Reiter and Hankinson named it the musical highlight of the episode; Fallon and Stack went further and hailed it as a highlight of the entire series. Poniewozik commented that the number was "so appropriate that, had it not existed, Glee probably would have had to invent it". Wieselman suggested that Colfer and Michele "redefined show-stopper" with their performance, and Itzkoff lauded it as "a powerful reminder of why it's worth sticking with Glee through what has quickly proved a polarizing season."

Of the remaining songs, Rachel and Finn's performance of "Don't Go Breaking My Heart" attracted praise for Monteith's vocals, which Stack and Yahr commented "sounded better than ever". "Le Jazz Hot!" received a split response. Burns wrote that Kurt "pulled it off flawlessly", and Fallon called the performance "far more moving and rousing" than any of the songs in "Grilled Cheesus". Stack and Benigno both graded it "B+"; the latter deemed it "very good" but "not transcendent". Reiter felt that the costumes and choreography overpowered the emotion of the piece, and Futterman found the number "too self-indulgent and reminiscent of previous performances like 'Rose's Turn'." Berk rated it two stars out of five, and commented, "I get the idea, and the execution is commendable, but it still kind of sucked." Rachel and Finn's deliberately offensive version of "With You I'm Born Again" received a "C" and "C+" from Benigno and Stack respectively. Both conceded that it was acceptable vocally, but as Stack acknowledged, "the point of this song was to hate it, and I gotta say, Glee: you played me like a fiddle." In December 2012, TV Guide named their rendition one of Glee's worst performances. Regardless of being a send-up, Respers France found the number "oddly endearing".

=== Chart history ===
All six of the cover versions released as singles debuted on the Billboard Hot 100, and appeared on other musical charts. On the Hot 100, the show's rendition of "Lucky" debuted at number twenty-seven; it was at number seventeen on the Billboard Canadian Hot 100. The other five songs on the Hot 100 were "River Deep – Mountain High" at number forty-one, which also made number thirty-six on the Canadian Hot 100; "Happy Days Are Here Again / Get Happy" at number forty-eight, which also made number fifty-five on the Canadian Hot 100; "Don't Go Breaking My Heart" at number fifty, which also made number thirty-one on the Canadian Hot 100; "Sing!" at number eighty-seven, which also made number sixty-seven on the Canadian Hot 100; and "Le Jazz Hot!" at number ninety-four, which also made number eighty-eight on the Canadian Hot 100.

== Cultural references ==
"Viewing Party", a November 2010 episode of The Office, centers around the entire Dunder-Mifflin staff gathering at a co-worker's apartment to watch this episode.
