= Sammy Williams =

American actor (1948–2018)

Samuel Joseph Williams (November 13, 1948 – March 17, 2018) was an American actor of stage and film. He was best known for his role as Paul in the musical A Chorus Line, for which he won Broadway's 1976 Tony Award for Best Performance by a Featured Actor in a Musical.

== Early life and career ==
Williams was born in Trenton, New Jersey to Joseph Williams, a factory worker and Nona Dibella, a hospital employee. He started taking dance classes at age 8 at a studio run by John Tucci. He used to tag along to his sister's dance class, and one day when she refused to attend, he said "I can do that!" and his career was born. (This anecdote is the basis for the song "I Can Do That" in the musical A Chorus Line, although it was not related by Williams' character in the play.) After graduating from Steinert High School in Hamilton Township, Mercer County, New Jersey, where he performed school plays, he left for New York City in 1967 at age 19 to make it on Broadway.

He landed some tours and then appeared on Broadway in The Happy Time and Applause in chorus roles between 1968 and 1972.

== A Chorus Line and Broadway success ==
In 1974, Williams was then invited to participate in the famous workshops which led to the creation of 1975's A Chorus Line. He originated the role of Paul, a Puerto-Rican dancer who shared a heart-breaking and touching story of growing up gay in a Catholic high school, his years as a drag performer, and ultimate acceptance of his family. While the overall characterization of Paul was based on Williams, the bulk of the story was the true life experience of A Chorus Line co-author Nicholas Dante. Williams was extremely successful in the role and won the 1976 Tony Award for Best Featured Actor in a Musical. Along with the rest of the cast, Williams also won the 1976 Theatre World Award for Ensemble Performance for the show.

Williams continued on stage for several years, but he was unable to translate his success into significant credits in television and film, appearing in only a handful of projects, such as a guest appearance in Kojak. Frustrated, he eventually quit acting in the late 1980s and moved to West Hollywood, California, where he went into business as a florist. He designed floats for the Tournament of Roses Parade for 10 years.

== Later career ==
Eventually, Williams decided to give acting another try and began performing in California and even touring in a one-man show about his experiences in A Chorus Line, among other things. He commented, "It tells of my journey through the rehearsal process and the experience of doing the show and the things that happened after I left the show. So many people ask me what happened, so I just wrote a show about it."

He died on 17 March 2018, of cancer in North Hollywood, Los Angeles, California.

== Filmography ==
Year	Title	Role	Notes
1976	God Told Me To	Harold Gorman	
