= Jessica Lee Goldyn =

American Broadway actress (born 1985)

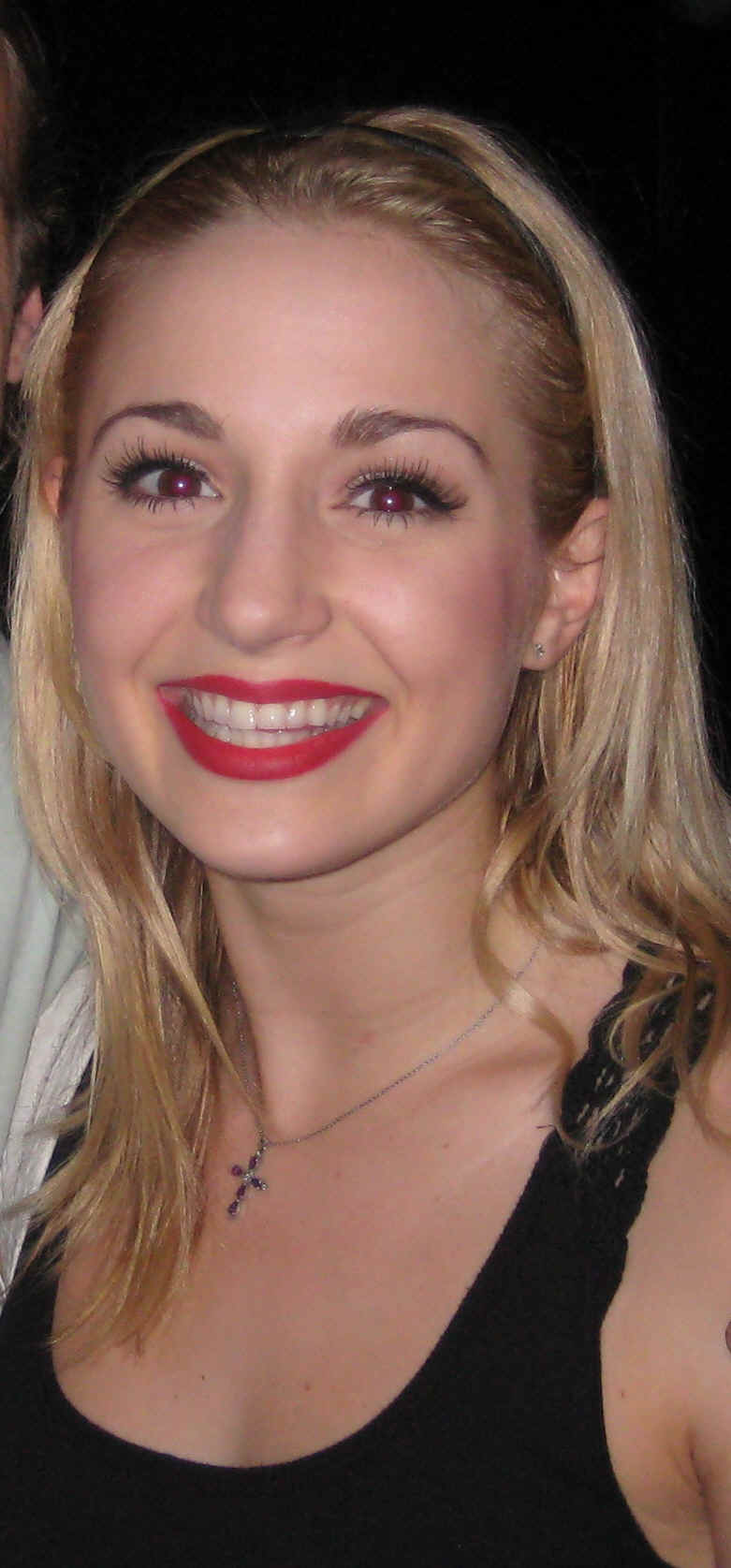
- Born: December 26, 1985 (age 40); Staten Island, New York, U.S.
- Occupation: Stage actress
- Years active: 2006 ─ present

Jessica Lee Goldyn (born December 26, 1985) is an American musical theatre actress, singer, and dancer best known for creating the role of Val in the Broadway revival of A Chorus Line. Goldyn played the lead role of Cassie from August 10, 2008 opposite Mario Lopez as Zack, until the show ended its Broadway revival run on August 17, 2008. Goldyn had been an understudy for the lead character of Cassie. She appeared as Nini (replacement) in Moulin Rouge! The Musical. Goldyn appeared in The Paper Mill Playhouse (NJ) rendition of A Chorus Line in the star role of Cassie from October 7 through October 28, 2012.

== Early Training ==
Goldyn grew up in Parsippany-Troy Hills, New Jersey where she spent her early years dancing. Her mother taught her dance until she was old enough to attend dance class. Additionally, she did gymnastics competitively, starting around age 7.

At 12, she was cast in a production of Gypsy at the Paper Mill Playhouse. During her teen years she played nearly every female character in a A Chorus Line, including a female version of Mike.

She attended the Professional Performing Arts School in New York but never graduated. Instead she received her GED after getting hired in a non-Equity tour of Fosse.

Goldyn has trained with the New Jersey Ballet Company and has been a student and instructor at the Worth Tyrrell Studios.

Goldyn was a Children's Foundation for the Arts grant recipient from 1998 to 2003.

== Personal life ==
On Instagram, Goldyn has posted openly about her sobriety. She has been sober since 2013.

In March 2023, Goldyn was engaged to fellow performer Blake Zelesnikar (credits include the national tours of Mean Girls, An American in Paris, The Phantom of the Opera, and Flashdance the Musical).

== Previous Work ==
Goldyn's professional debut was in the ensemble of Gypsy at Paper Mill Playhouse in September 1998.

Goldyn’s various regional theatrical credits include Fosse, A Chorus Line (Val), Sweet Charity (Charity), A Christmas Carol at North Shore Music Theatre, and Pippin at the Arvada Center.

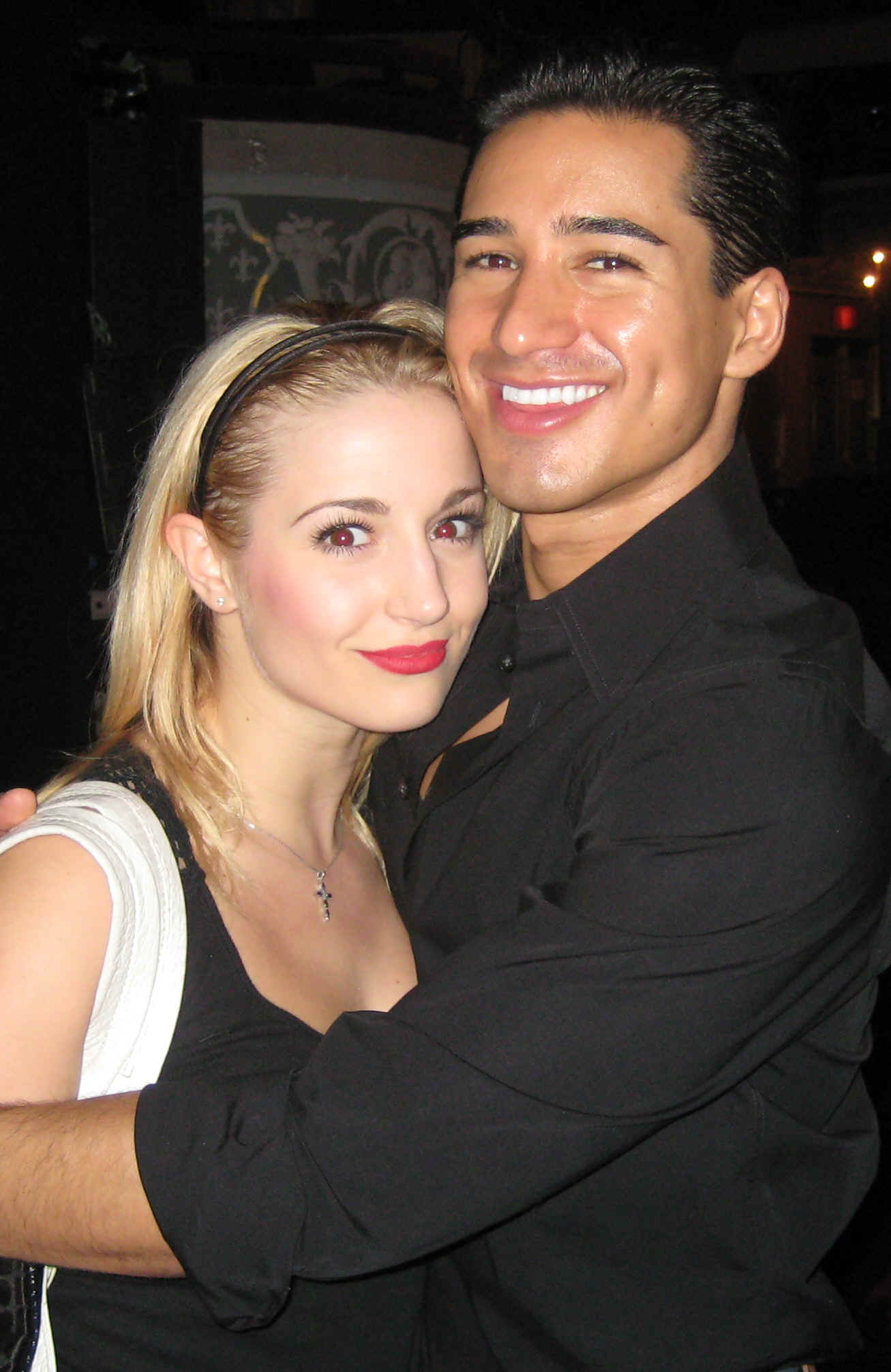
Jessica Lee Goldyn with her co-star from A Chorus Line Mario Lopez on August 14, 2008

== Broadway ==
Goldyn made her Broadway debut on October 5, 2006 when she opened as Val in the revival of A Chorus Line. Goldyn is one of the few original revival cast members who closed the show, finishing as Cassie. At the auditions for the revival, Goldyn was originally considered as a cover for the character Val, but won the role at the final callback. Goldyn replaced Charlotte d'Amboise as Cassie from August 13–17, 2008.

In 2015, Goldyn returned to Broadway in Finding Neverland at the Lunt-Fontanne Theatre. Goldyn was previously featured in the short-lived Broadway production of Tuck Everlasting, which opened April 26, 2016 at the Broadhurst Theatre. The show only ran a total of 28 previews and 39 regular performances and closed on May 29, 2016.

From 2017-2018, Goldyn performed in the ensemble of the hit Bette Midler-led revival of Hello, Dolly! at the Shubert Theatre (New York City).

She succeeded Broadway’s original Nini Robin Hurder in Moulin Rouge! The Musical at the Al Hirschfeld Theatre on February 22, 2022 and departed the role on April 9, 2023.

== Other Stage Work ==
=== On the Town ===
Goldyn portrayed the dance-intensive Ivy in On the Town as part of New York City Center’s 2008-2009 Encores! season, part of a citywide celebration of On the Town composer Leonard Bernstein’s 90th birthday. Goldyn appeared opposite Justin Bohon as Chip, Christian Borle as Ozzie, and Tony Yazbeck, her former Chorus Line colleague, as Gabey. Leslie Kritzer as Hildy Esterhazy and Jennifer Laura Thompson as Claire DeLoone rounded out the trio of the sailors’ romantic counterparts.

=== Crazy for You ===
Goldyn starred as Polly in the Maine State Music Theatre production of Crazy for You in July 2009 opposite Tony Yazbeck.

=== Sweet Charity ===
From July 30, 2009 to August 9 Goldyn choreographed Sweet Charity at The Mac-Haydn Theatre in Chatham, N.Y. using original Fosse choreography.

=== Peter Pan ===
From June 2 to 27, 2010, Goldyn returned to Paper Mill Playhouse as Tiger Lilly in their production of Peter Pan.

=== Damn Yankees ===
In August 2010 Jessica replaced Felicia Finley as Lola in Damn Yankees at the John W. Engeman Theater in Northport.

=== Chicago ===
In January–February 2019, Goldlyn starred as Roxie Hart in Fulton Theatre's production of Chicago alongside fellow Chorus Line cast member Heather Parcells as Velma.

Year(s)	Production	Role	Notes
2006-08	A Chorus Line	Valerie Clark	Closed show as Cassie
2015-16	Finding Neverland	Ensemble	Replacement
2016	Tuck Everlasting	Ensemble	U/S Mother
2017-18	Hello, Dolly!	Ensemble	
2022-23	Moulin Rouge! The Musical	Nini-Legs-In-The-Air	Broadway Replacement

== External sources ==
- IBDB Jessica Lee Goldyn at the Internet Broadway Database
- A Chorus Line: Now Playing On Broadway; The Cast: Jessica Lee Goldyn (Val)
- Playbill: Jessica Lee Goldyn
- Broadway.Com: On The Line: Meeting The Stars Of A Chorus Line
- CBS Evening News: Jersey Girl Is A Singular Sensation
- MASTER CLASS with Jessica Lee Goldyn
- Rocky Mountain News - Broadway bound: Arvada Center actress wins a key role in 'Chorus Line'
- NJTheater.com
- The New Yorker - Toeing The Line: "A Chorus Line" is back on Broadway
- NJ.COM - A Chorus Line: Ready to tread the boards
