= Grilled Cheesus =

- Glee episode
- Episode no.: Season 2 Episode 3
- Directed by: Alfonso Gomez-Rejon
- Written by: Brad Falchuk
- Production code: 2ARC03
- Original air date: October 5, 2010

Guest appearances
- Iqbal Theba as Principal Figgins; Romy Rosemont as Carole Hudson; Dot-Marie Jones as Shannon Beiste; Harry Shum, Jr. as Mike Chang; Chord Overstreet as Sam Evans; James Earl as Azimio; Robin Trocki as Jean Sylvester

Episode chronology
← Previous "Britney/Brittany"	Next → "Duets"
- Glee season 2

"Grilled Cheesus" is the third episode of the second season of the American television series Glee, and the twenty-fifth episode overall. It was written by Brad Falchuk, directed by Alfonso Gomez-Rejon, and premiered on the Fox network on October 5, 2010. Prior to its broadcast, series co-creator Ryan Murphy predicted the episode would be Glee's most controversial, as it focuses on religion, and on what God means to the members of the glee club.

When Burt Hummel (Mike O'Malley) has a heart attack, the glee club rally around his son Kurt (Chris Colfer), attempting to support the Hummels through their various faiths. Meanwhile, club co-captain Finn Hudson (Cory Monteith) believes he has found the face of Jesus in a grilled cheese sandwich.

Murphy hoped to produce a balanced depiction of religion, and he, Falchuk and series co-creator Ian Brennan worked to ensure that there was an equality between pro and anti-religious sentiments expressed. The episode features seven cover versions of songs, each of which charted on the Billboard Hot 100, marking the series' one-week debut high in the US. Critics disagreed over the appropriateness of the musical performances, with some complaining of the tangential relationship between the numbers and religion, and others appreciating that the Glee versions brought new meaning to the songs.

"Grilled Cheesus" was watched by 11.20 million US viewers, and was the second most watched scripted show of the week among adults aged 18–49. It received mixed reviews, with Colfer and O'Malley receiving critical acclaim, and several reviewers praising Glee for successfully balancing opposing viewpoints. However, other reviewers criticized the episode for its lack of subtlety, and Lisa Respers France of CNN denounced "Grilled Cheesus" as an Emmy-submission showpiece for Colfer.

== Plot ==
Glee club co-captain Finn Hudson (Cory Monteith) believes he has found the face of Jesus in a grilled cheese sandwich and asks for three prayers to be granted: for the school football team to win a game, for his girlfriend Rachel Berry (Lea Michele) to let him touch her breasts, and for him to be reinstated as quarterback. When his first prayer comes true, he asks the glee club to join him in honoring Jesus through song.

Club member Kurt Hummel (Chris Colfer) is devastated when his father Burt Hummel (Mike O'Malley) suffers a heart attack. His best friend Mercedes Jones (Amber Riley) sings Whitney Houston's "I Look to You" to him, hoping he will find strength in faith. However, Kurt reveals that he is an atheist. Cheerleading coach Sue Sylvester (Jane Lynch), also an atheist, takes umbrage at the glee club singing religious songs in a public school setting, and has Kurt make a formal complaint. When confronted by guidance counselor Emma Pillsbury (Jayma Mays), Sue admits that as a child, she prayed that God would cure her sister Jean (Robin Trocki), who has Down syndrome. Her prayers went unanswered, leading her to conclude that God simply does not exist.

Mercedes, Rachel and Quinn Fabray (Dianna Agron) pray for Burt, with Rachel singing "Papa, Can You Hear Me?" from Yentl at his bedside. Kurt is resistant, and later at glee club rehearsal sings The Beatles' "I Want to Hold Your Hand", stating that his faith takes the form of love for his father. He accepts an invitation from Mercedes to attend her church, where the choir sing "Bridge over Troubled Water". At the church service, Mercedes asks the congregation to pray for the Hummels.

Finn's remaining prayers also come true. Rachel comes to Finn's house one evening, and in his bedroom she admits that she would prefer to raise her children in the Jewish faith; she would not be able to have a future with him if he puts his faith in Jesus. Finn agrees that their children would be raised as she chooses, so to confirm her trust and appreciation of him, she allows him to touch the side of her breast as they make out. Later, Finn is also reinstated as quarterback, but it occurs because his replacement Sam Evans (Chord Overstreet) is injured during a game, dislocating his shoulder. Finn feels responsible and confesses his guilt to Emma, who tells him it is unlikely God is communicating specifically with him through a grilled cheese sandwich. A despondent Finn doubts his new-found faith, singing R.E.M.'s "Losing My Religion".

At Burt's bedside, Kurt tells his still unconscious father that he feels he should have accepted his friends' prayers. As Kurt cries, Burt begins to regain consciousness and is able to squeeze his son's hand. Meanwhile, Sue visits Jean in her residential home and discusses God with her sister. Jean asks Sue if she may pray for her, and Sue accepts. Later, the glee club comes together to sing Joan Osborne's "One of Us". Sue watches the performance, but tells Will she will not report him for allowing a religious song. At home, Finn eats the remainder of the grilled cheese sandwich.

== Production ==
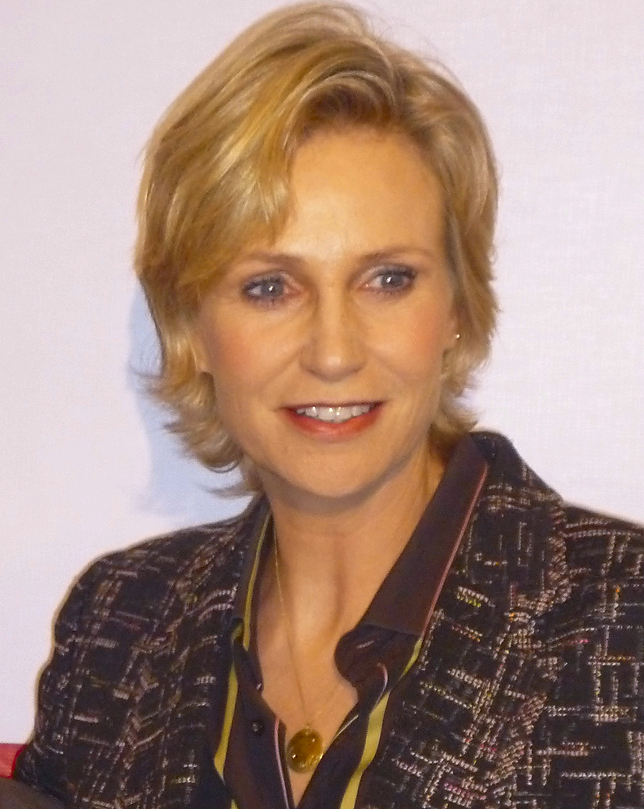
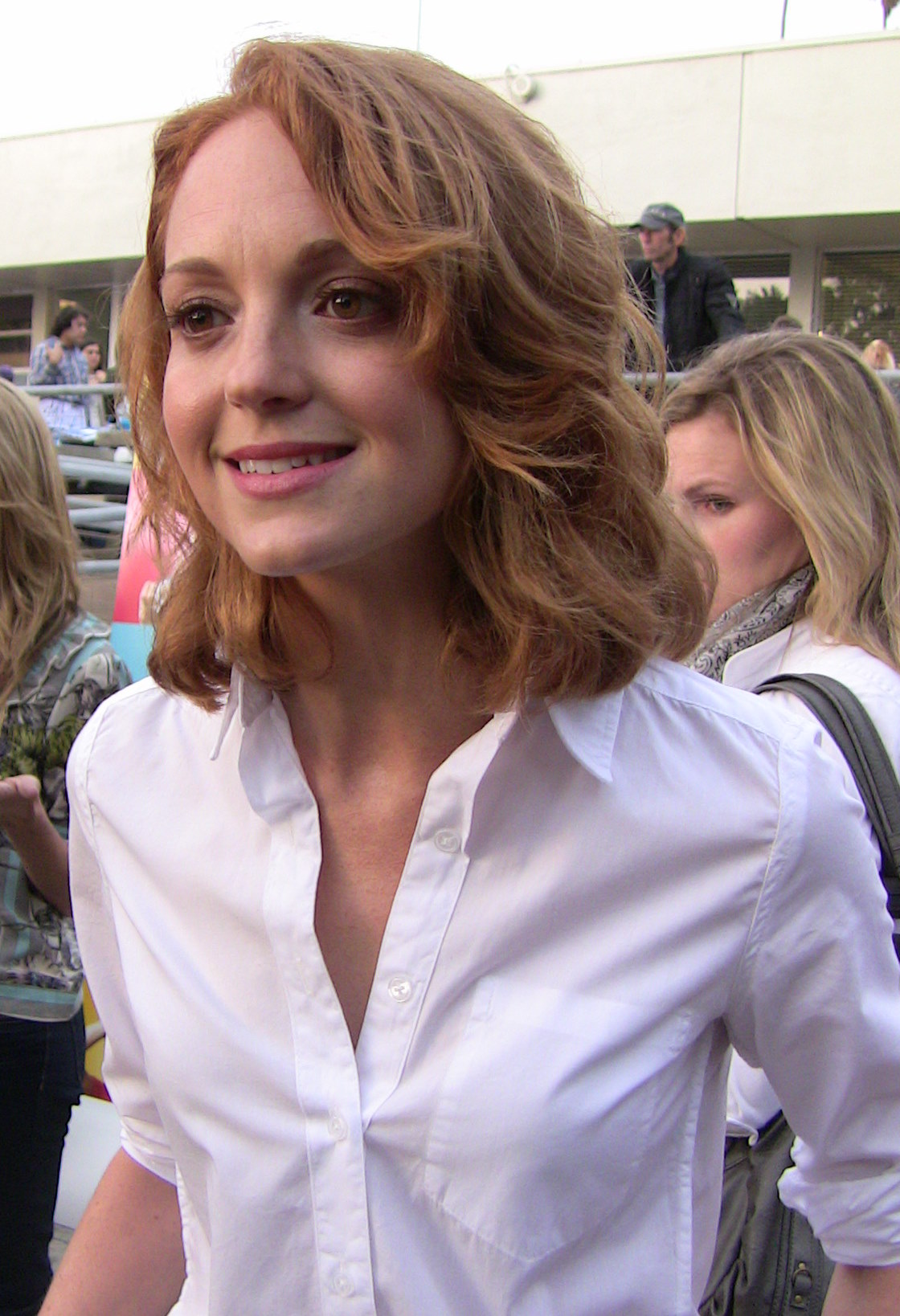
Series co-creator Ryan Murphy expressed pride in the "Grilled Cheesus" scene involving a philosophical disagreement between Sue (Jane Lynch, left) and Emma (Jayma Mays, right)

"Grilled Cheesus" is intended to begin a season arc depicting the glee club members rallying around those who are subject to bullying and persecution. For Glee's second season, Murphy confirmed plans to cast a Christian character on the show, expressing desires to keep Glee a "show about inclusiveness". In an interview with TV Guide, Murphy said on Christianity, "If we're trying to form a world of inclusiveness, we've got to include that point of view as well." He predicted "Grilled Cheesus" would be the most controversial episode of the series to date, as it depicts the spiritual and emotional importance of God to the characters. Murphy aimed to address religion in a "socially responsible" way, and compared "Grilled Cheesus" to topical Norman Lear shows of the 1970s. He hoped to produce a balanced depiction of the subject matter, and he, along with co-writers Brennan and Falchuk, checked the script to ensure that for every anti-religious sentiment conveyed, there was a pro-religious one to counterbalance it. The episode references several religions apart from Christianity; Puck and Rachel are both Jewish, Kurt hires an acupuncturist who is a Sikh, and makes a reference to the Flying Spaghetti Monster.

Sue's philosophical argument with Emma about religion is the scene that Murphy is "most proud to have been involved with in [his] entire career." Explaining Sue's stance on religion, he stated: "Sue's an atheist, but I love that she doesn't want to be. She and [Kurt] are both saying to the world, 'Prove us wrong: If God is kindness and love, make me believe in God.'" Murphy felt it would have been easy to have Kurt sing an anti-religious song, but instead chose to have him sing about his faith in love.

O'Malley was a recurring cast member throughout Glee's first season, and was promoted to a series regular starting in season two. He commented that the episode would be an emotional one, developing the father-son relationship further. Recurring characters who appear in this episode include glee club member Mike Chang (Harry Shum, Jr.), football player Sam Evans, Principal Figgins (Iqbal Theba), football coach Shannon Beiste (Dot-Marie Jones), Finn's mother Carole Hudson (Romy Rosemont), and Sue's sister Jean Sylvester. An eight-year-old Kurt appears in a series of flashback scenes, including his mother's funeral, played by child actor Adam Kolkin.

== Music ==
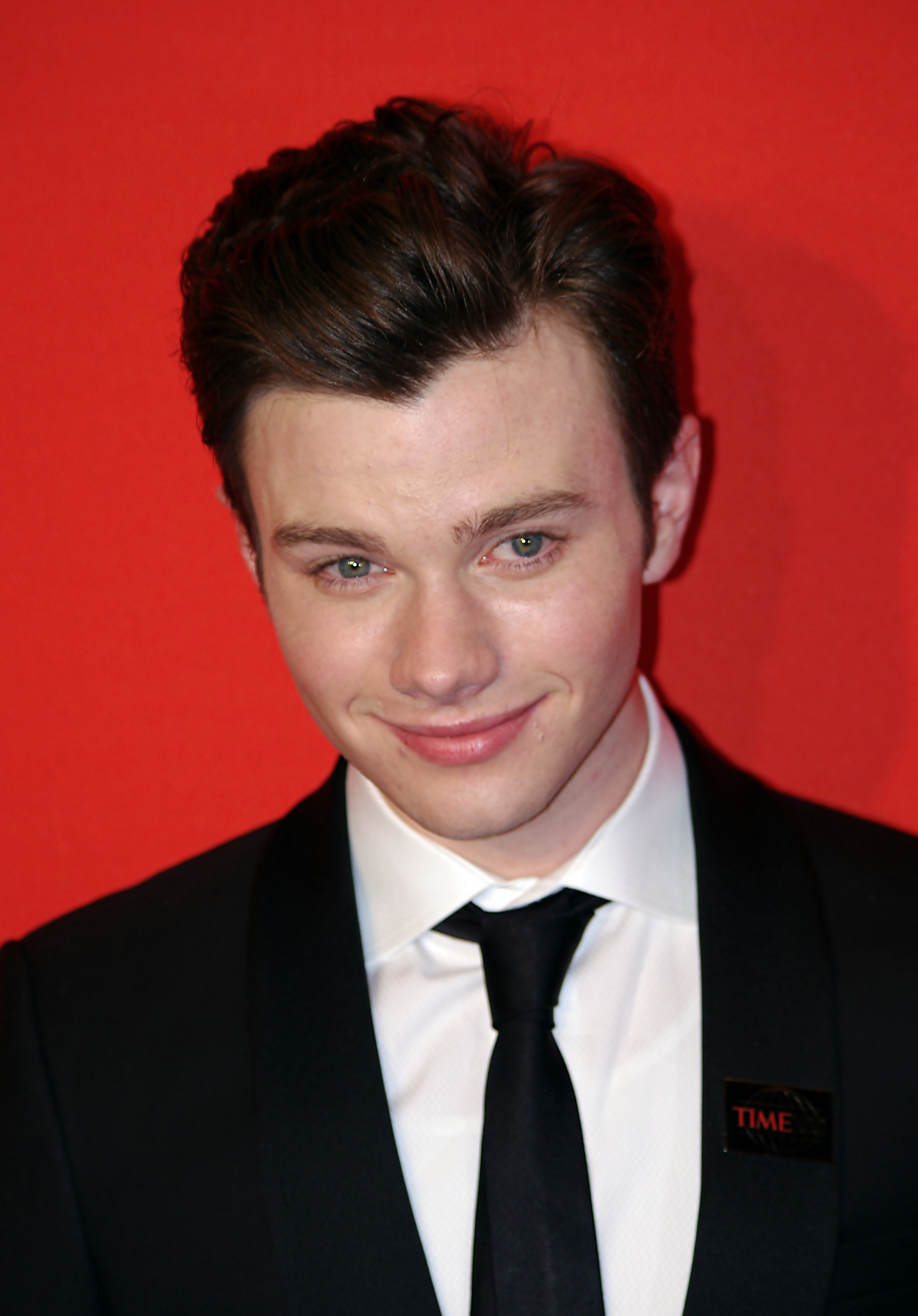
In "Grilled Cheesus", atheist Kurt (Chris Colfer, pictured) sings The Beatles' "I Want to Hold Your Hand" about his faith in love. Critics disagreed over the appropriateness of this song choice.

The episode featured cover versions of Billy Joel's "Only the Good Die Young", Whitney Houston's "I Look to You", "Papa, Can You Hear Me?" as performed by Barbra Streisand in the musical film Yentl, The Beatles' "I Want to Hold Your Hand" as covered by T. V. Carpio in the musical film Across the Universe, R.E.M.'s "Losing My Religion", Simon & Garfunkel's "Bridge over Troubled Water" as covered by Aretha Franklin, and Joan Osborne's "One of Us". Monteith said he and series music producer Adam Anders "had a bit of a different idea" about how "Losing My Religion" should be performed. While Anders "always brings the songs in very positive, very upbeat", he felt the song "was expressing a betrayal", and with Finn feeling both betrayal and anger, Monteith wanted his performance to reflect that. All songs performed were released as singles, available for download, and "I Want to Hold Your Hand" and "One of Us" are included on the album Glee: The Music, Volume 4. All singles charted on the Billboard Hot 100 and Canadian Hot 100. With seven new entries, it marked the series' one-week debut high in the US. The best performing single was "I Want to Hold Your Hand", which reached number 21 in Canada and 36 in the US. With 69,000 copies sold in the US, it also reached number 15 on the Hot Digital Songs chart.

Zap2it's Carina Adly MacKenzie commented positively on Michele's "beautiful" rendition of "Papa, Can You Hear Me?", however expressed displeasure that Rachel had cried during her solo in three consecutive episodes, suggesting the producers give her a more uplifting song. She praised Salling's "Only the Good Die Young", which was selected by Lisa de Moraes of The Washington Post as the best performance of the episode, for being the most in-keeping with Glee's usual tone. Erica Futterman of Rolling Stone praised "I Want to Hold Your Hand", writing that, "the Beatles' coy flirtation is replaced with a simple, wistful plea that hits just the right note." She commended Riley's vocals on "Bridge over Troubled Water", commenting that Murphy should assign Mercedes more solo performances. Futterman criticized "Losing My Religion", however, observing that Monteith struggled to reach the notes, resulting in a performance "more awkward than inspired."

Anthony Benigno of the Daily News commented positively on the arrangement of Monteith's song, grading the performance "A". His lowest grade went to "Papa, Can You Hear Me?", which he gave a "C". Benigno felt that both Michele and Colfer's solos were damaged by the fact that the songs' only link to the episode's plot were their titles, finding it particularly jarring to hear Kurt singing "I wanna be your man" about his father. The A.V. Club's Emily St. James felt that the music was the worst aspect of the episode, similarly criticizing song selections based on their tangential relationship to religion. She felt that Kurt's performance was the only number which worked even slightly, commenting, "it genuinely grows out of the moment, although the fact that Kurt is singing it to his dad never stops being kind of weird." Both Jessica Derschowitz of CBS News and MTV's Aly Semigran enjoyed that the performance of "I Want to Hold Your Hand" brought new meaning to the song, with Semigran naming it her favourite number of the episode. She felt that "I Look to You" was the episode's weakest song, preferring Riley's "more powerful" rendition of "Bridge over Troubled Water". Amy Reiter of the Los Angeles Times expressed disappointment in both of Riley's songs, which left her "strangely unmoved". She suggested that, "Mercedes sang admirably, beautifully even, but she didn’t seem truly transported by the music; so we weren't."

== Reception ==
=== Ratings ===
During its original broadcast, "Grilled Cheesus" was watched by 11.20 million American viewers and attained a 4.6/13 Nielsen rating/share in the 18–49 demographic. Viewership and ratings both decreased from the previous episode, which was watched by 13.51 million viewers and attained a 5.9/17 rating/share. "Grilled Cheesus" was the most watched scripted show for the week of broadcast among adults aged 18–49, and the twenty-second most watched show among all viewers. In Canada, the episode was watched by 1.99 million viewers and was the eleventh most watched show of the week. It was again down on the previous episode, which was watched by 2.46 million viewers, making it the sixth most watched programme of the week. In Australia, "Grilled Cheesus" drew 1.029 million viewers, placing eleventh for the night. In the UK, the episode was watched by 2.502 million viewers (2.175 million on E4, and 327,000 on E4+1), becoming the most watched show on E4 and E4 +1 for the week, and the most watched show on cable for the week.

=== Critical response ===
The episode received mixed reviews from critics. Tim Stack of Entertainment Weekly named it as one of his favorite episodes of the series, calling it "not only funny and moving, but incredibly important", both for its religious element and message of tolerance. Stack praised the performances by Colfer and O'Malley, as did USA Today's Robert Bianco, who deemed the episode a "smart, moving, musical exploration of the power and limits of faith and religion in a democratic society". Bianco commented positively on the way Colfer's singing was used to "dig beneath the archness and anger in Kurt's behavior", calling it "a textbook example of what music can add to drama." Mark Perigard of the Boston Herald went further in his praise, deeming "Grilled Cheesus" "the perfect blend of music, characterization and plot - and easily the most provocative scripted hour in prime-time of the new season." Perigard appreciated the fact there were no easy answers presented, with no characters undergoing religious conversions during the course of the episode. Raymund Flandez of The Wall Street Journal felt that "Grilled Cheesus" succeeded in balancing opposing viewpoints, resulting in "a nuanced, atypical episode of Glee that was both conflictingly emotional and confidently serious about the topic of religion", and Semigran similarly commended the episode's balance, writing that Falchuk "covered both sides of controversial debate with grace, humor, and most importantly, respect." In an article discussing Glee's increasingly inconsistent tone, characterizations, and weird moments in the second season, film and television critic Matt Zoller Seitz cited "Grilled Cheesus" as an exception: "an episode built around an earnest, Afterschool Special-style contemplation of faith that improbably turned out to be one of the series' boldest, silliest, maybe finest hours".

"There are times when I like Glee because it is genuinely good, and there are times when I like it because it is simply not awful, against all odds. Regardless of your thoughts on the show, it sets its sights enormously high much of the time, taking aim at things that a musical dramedy with heavy camp elements about high school kids who like to sing really shouldn't even be cognizant of. Sometimes, praising an episode of Glee can turn into an exercise less about praising it for what it did and more about praising it for not completely embarrassing itself."

— Emily St. James of The A.V. Club, on reviewing "Grilled Cheesus"

Robert Canning of IGN felt that "Grilled Cheesus" was too varied tonally, failing to effectively bring together the "true anguish" of Kurt's storyline and "lunacy" of Finn's. He rated it 7.5/10, signifying a good episode, though his overall opinion was mixed. Canning commented that the Hummels' relationship is "the most affecting" of the show, and praised O'Malley's "outstandingly nuanced" performance as Burt, yet felt that the religious element gave the episode an after school special vibe and almost became "over-the-top preachy and self-important". St. James graded the episode "B−", commenting that she was uncertain whether she genuinely loved it, or was overlooking flaws because it handled the religious element acceptably. St. James stated that it would be easy to criticize Glee, but while television as a whole does not do earnestness well, Glee at its best, as in "Grilled Cheesus", "revels in just how damn earnest it can be". James Poniewozik of Time wrote that the episode's premise was "absurdly ambitious", yet felt it was largely successful in being respectful to both atheism and religion. He criticized the musical numbers for detracting from the plot, but appreciated the focus on Kurt and Burt, also naming theirs one of Glee's "strongest and most nuanced relationships".

Lisa Respers France of CNN was dismayed that the episode felt forced, like an Emmy submission showpiece for Colfer. She disliked Kurt's angry, "overwrought" reaction to his friends' prayers and the "silly" grilled cheese sandwich subplot, however wished there had been more focus on the "rich, barely tapped vein" of the Sue subplot. The Atlantic's Kevin Fallon criticized the episode's lack of subtlety, feeling that in its attempt to be controversial, Glee became a clichéd after school special. Fallon had been excited to see religion and homosexuality tackled on Glee, but was disappointed that the end result was "completely devoid of humor", with dialogue "so stilted, wooden, and earnest that the treatment of the subject was largely ineffective and far too easy to make fun of." Benigno also commented negatively on the lack of subtlety, deeming it Glee's "biggest flaw". He commended Lynch's performance as Sue, however, writing: "It's outrageous how good she is despite having only three scenes of screen time."
