= Sing! (song) =

Song from the musical A Chorus Line

Sing! is a song from the musical A Chorus Line. It is performed by Kristine and Al.

== Synopsis ==
The song "comically makes it cringe-ably clear that Kristine is tone deaf while her husband (Al) helps her through it".

It features "newly married dancers auditioning for the same show. Kristine is the ditzy tone-deaf hopeful who is cleverly interjected by her husband Al in her "solo.""

== Critical reception ==
Norwood Stage described it as a "comic song". Wicked Local North of Boston said it was a "cute comical song and dance". Independent Newspapers said it "provide[s] comic relief". AussieTheatre called it a "comedy number".

The Real Chrisparkle commented: "When Bad Wolf and I were talking about the show beforehand, we both agreed that “Sing” is probably our least favourite number, because of its potential to irritate; just slightly. But it occurred to me whilst watching it, that it must be extraordinarily demanding for its performers. You need the verbal dexterity of a Gilbert and Sullivan patter song, coupled with immaculate comedy timing and, from Kristine, the ability to sing credibly off-key." StageWhispers named it a "funny, rapid-fire duet". The Rider News noted "“Sing!” makes for a great contrast in the play, breaking the tension and adding in quirky humor".

== In popular culture ==
The song was covered in the musical comedy television series Glee. In the season 2 episode "Duets", Mike Chang (Harry Shum Jr.) and Tina Cohen-Chang (Jenna Ushkowitz) perform the duet with Mike largely speaking and Tina singing.
