= Nervi International Ballet Festival =

Nervi International Ballet Festival (Festival internazionale del balletto di Nervi) held during summer in Nervi (now a quartiere of Genoa) from 1955 to 2004 was the first event entirely dedicated to dance in post-war Italy. Together with the Festival dei Due Mondi in Spoleto it is considered the most significant event of the Italian dance scene.

== History ==
In 1953, in Genoa Mario Porcile opened a classical ballet school, assisted by his friend and La Scala dancer Ugo Dell'Ara. In 1955 they opened the first Italian festival dedicated solely to ballet, set up for many years in the famous Nervi parks.

Since then, and until 2004, the event has had 34 editions, set up until 1992 exclusively outdoors in the Parks of Nervi; from 1995 to 1999 the shows took place between Teatro ai Parchi and Teatro Carlo Felice, from 2000 exclusively to Carlo Felice and other theaters in the city center.

== See also ==
- List of opera festivals
