= Hello Twelve, Hello Thirteen, Hello Love =

"Hello Twelve, Hello Thirteen, Hello Love" is a song from the musical A Chorus Line.

== Production ==
This song, just like all others in the musical A Chorus Line, was devised from the audio of real life dancers, recounting their experiences.

== Synopsis ==
The official website of Marvin Hamlisch explains that in this song, "The conversation turns to sex, puberty. All reminisce about their circumstances growing up".

== Composition ==
Talkin' Broadway wrote "The musical is still innovative in the way it melds song, dance and dialogue into a single piece of art: "Hello Twelve, Hello Thirteen, Hello Love" envelops the audience as it incorporates full songs, brief melodies, and single spoken lines with almost constant movement."

== Analysis ==
Musicals 101 analyses this song:

"Hello Twelve, Hello Thirteen, Hello Love" is a montage sequence, Bennett at his best. All of the dancers share memories of their traumatic early teens. The number is constantly surprising and alive with shifting emotions, symptomatic of the years it thematically epitomizes. This is the first of several places in the show where homosexuality is dealt with in a matter of fact style. A Chorus Line was the first Broadway musical to do that.

== Critical reception ==
New City Stage wrote that "the brilliance of A Chorus Line has always been in the undeniable synergy of all its creative elements. Case in point: the show’s fifteen-minute "Hello Twelve, Hello Thirteen, Hello Love" number, better known as the 'Montage' since it actually consists of musical numbers within numbers, monologues, lyrical fragments and all-out dance sequences." The LA Times describes the number as "dazzling". Hi-Def Digest wrote "arguably the show's most exuberant song, "Hello Twelve, Hello Thirteen, Hello Love", [is] a clever, catchy celebration of adolescent agony". Florida Theatre On Stage wrote "Another memorable stretch was the extended fever dream of internal monologues about adolescence "Hello Twelve, Hello Thirteen, Hello Love". Besides the perfect staging and performances, it highlighted the fluid lighting design by Paul Black (including considerable backlighting) and split-second calls of stage managers Brandy Demil and Michael J. Iannelli." The New York Times wrote "Driven by the rush of Mr. Bennett’s dynamic choreography, the mesh of story and songs is wonderfully seamless, especially in extended montages like the frenetic opening, "I Hope I Get It", and "Hello Twelve, Hello Thirteen, Hello Love", a complex salute to the million and one pains of growing up." RecordOnline wrote: "Most impressive might have been the wondrous "Montage Part 1: Hello Twelve, Hello Thirteen, Hello Love". The ensemble packed great energy into this number, which sheds the innocence from the stage and turns the dancers into professionals."
