= Heather Parcells =

American actress, singer and dancer

Heather Parcells is an American actress, singer and dancer. She is a graduate of Florida State's musical theatre training BFA program.

She has toured the US as Velma Kelly in the musical show Chicago, as well as Miss Dorothy in Thoroughly Modern Millie and the ensemble in Some Like It Hot. She made her Broadway debut in Chitty Chitty Bang Bang and in 2007 played Judy in the revival of A Chorus Line on Broadway.

She attended Hampton Roads Academy in Newport News, Virginia, where she got her first taste of performing when she landed the role of Audrey in Little Shop of Horrors during her junior year of high school. Her first paying performance was playing Gordon the Dragon (immersed in a sweltering full-body costume) at Busch Gardens at Williamsburg, Virginia.

Her most recent appearance on Broadway came in Tuck Everlasting.

In 2024 she performed in Timberlake Playhouses production of “Anything Goes” in the lead role of Reno Sweeney
