= A Chorus Line =

Musical by Michael Bennett and Marvin Hamlisch

- Original Broadway windowcard
- Music: Marvin Hamlisch
- Lyrics: Edward Kleban
- Book: James Kirkwood Jr. Nicholas Dante
- Productions: 1975 Off-Broadway; 1975 Broadway; 1976 North American tour 1976 US tour 1976 West End; 1990 US tour 1996 North American tour 2006 Broadway revival 2008 North American tour 2013 West End revival
- Awards: Tony Award for Best Musical; Tony Award for Best Book of a Musical; Tony Award for Best Original Score; Pulitzer Prize for Drama; Olivier Award for Best Musical; Drama Desk Award for Outstanding Musical; Helpmann Award for Best Musical

A Chorus Line is a 1975 musical conceived by Michael Bennett with music by Marvin Hamlisch, lyrics by Edward Kleban, and a book by James Kirkwood Jr. and Nicholas Dante.

Set on the bare stage of a Broadway theater, the musical is centered on seventeen Broadway dancers auditioning for spots on a chorus line. A Chorus Line provides a glimpse into the personalities of the performers and the choreographer, as they describe the events that have shaped their lives and their decisions to become dancers.

Following several workshops and an Off-Broadway production, A Chorus Line opened at the Shubert Theatre on Broadway July 25, 1975, directed by Michael Bennett and co-choreographed by Bennett and Bob Avian. An unprecedented box office and critical hit, the musical received twelve Tony Award nominations and won nine, in addition to the 1976 Pulitzer Prize for Drama.

The original Broadway production ran for 6,137 performances, becoming the longest-running production in Broadway history until surpassed by Cats in 1997, and the longest-running Broadway musical originally produced in the US, until surpassed in 2011 by the revival of Chicago. It remains the seventh longest-running Broadway show ever. A Chorus Line's success has spawned many successful productions worldwide. It began a lengthy run in the West End in 1976 winning the Laurence Olivier Award for Best New Musical and was revived on Broadway in 2006, and in the West End in 2013.

== Synopsis ==
The show opens during an audition for an upcoming Broadway production. The formidable director Zach and his assistant choreographer Larry put the 24 dancers through their paces. Every dancer is desperate for work ("I Hope I Get It"). After a round of cuts, 17 dancers remain. Zach tells them he is looking for a strong eight-member dancing chorus of four boys and four girls. Wanting to learn more about them, he asks the dancers to introduce themselves. Reluctantly, the dancers reveal their pasts. The stories generally progress chronologically from early life experiences through adulthood to their chosen career.

The first candidate, Mike Costa, explains that he is the youngest of 12 children. He recalls his first experience with dance, watching his sister Rosalie's dance class when he was a preschooler ("I Can Do That"). Mike replaced her one day when she refused to go to class—and he stayed. As Bobby Mills tries to hide his unhappy childhood by making jokes, the other dancers distrust this strange audition process and debate what they should reveal to Zach ("And..."), but since they all need the job, the session continues.

Zach is angered that the streetwise Sheila Bryant is seemingly not taking the audition seriously. Opening up, she reveals that her mother married at a young age and her father neither cared about nor loved them. At age six she realized, as had fellow auditionees Bebe Benzenheimer and Maggie Winslow, that ballet helped her escape her unhappy family life ("At the Ballet"). Scatterbrained and tone-deaf Kristine Urich-DeLuca laments being unable to sing, while her husband Al finishes her phrases in tune ("Sing!").

Mark Anthony, the youngest dancer, relates his first exposure to the male and female anatomy and his first wet dream, and the 4 ft 10 in (1.47 m) Connie Wong laments the problems of being short, while the other dancers share their own memories of adolescence ("Hello Twelve, Hello Thirteen, Hello Love"). Diana Morales describes her horrible high school acting class ("Nothing"), Don Kerr remembers his first job at a nightclub and Judy Turner reflects on her problematic childhood while others talk about their parents' opinions ("Mother"). Greg Gardner discusses discovering his homosexuality and Richie Walters recounts nearly becoming a kindergarten teacher ("Gimme the Ball"). Finally, the newly-buxom Val Clark explains that talent alone isn't everything without good looks, and plastic surgery can really help improve one's image and career prospects ("Dance: Ten, Looks: Three").

The dancers go downstairs to learn a song for the audition's next section, but experienced dancer Cassie Ferguson, who has had notable successes as a soloist, stays onstage to talk to Zach. They have a history together: Zach had previously cast her in featured parts, and they had lived together for several years. Zach tells Cassie that she is too good for the chorus and shouldn't be at this audition. However, she explains her current inability to find solo work and is willing to "come home" to the chorus where she can at least express her passion for dance ("The Music and the Mirror"). Zach relents and sends her downstairs to learn the dance combination.

Zach calls Paul San Marco, who has been reluctant to share his past, onstage for a private talk, and he emotionally details his childhood and teenage years, his early career in a drag act, facing his manhood and his homosexuality, and his parents ultimately discovering his lifestyle and disowning him for it, before breaking down, with Zach comforting him. Cassie and Zach's complex relationship resurfaces during a run-through of the number created to showcase an unnamed star ("One"). Zach confronts Cassie, feeling that she is "dancing down," and they rehash the issues in their relationship and her career. Zach points to the machine-like movement of the other dancers, who have all blended together and will probably never be recognized individually, and mockingly asks if she wants this. Cassie defiantly defends the dancers: "I'd be proud to be one of them. They're wonderful....They're all special. I'd be happy to be dancing in that line. Yes, I would...and I'll take chorus...if you'll take me."

During a tap sequence, Paul falls and injures his knee that recently underwent surgery. After Paul is carried off to the hospital, all at the audition stand in disbelief, realizing that their careers can also end in an instant. Zach asks the remaining dancers what they will do when they can no longer dance. Led by Diana, they assert that whatever happens next in their lives and/or careers, they will be free of regret for pursuing their dreams ("What I Did for Love"). The final eight dancers are selected: Mike, Cassie, Bobby, Judy, Richie, Val, Mark, and Diana.

"One" (Reprise/Finale) begins with an individual bow for each of the 19 characters, their hodgepodge rehearsal clothes replaced by identical spangled gold costumes. As each dancer joins the group, it is suddenly difficult to distinguish one from the other: ironically, each character who was an individual to the audience seems now to be an anonymous member of a never-ending ensemble.

== Musical numbers ==
- "I Hope I Get It" – Company
- "I Can Do That" – Mike
- "And..." – Bobby, Richie, Val, and Judy
- "At the Ballet" – Sheila, Bebe, and Maggie
- "Sing!" – Kristine, Al, and Company
- "Montage Part 1: Hello Twelve, Hello Thirteen, Hello Love" – Mark, Connie, and Company
- "Montage Part 2: Nothing" – Diana
- "Montage Part 3: Mother" – Don, Judy, Maggie, and Company
- "Montage Part 4: Gimme the Ball" – Greg, Richie, and Company
- "Dance: Ten; Looks: Three" – Val
- "The Music and the Mirror" – Cassie
- "One" – Company
- "The Tap Combination" – Company
- "What I Did for Love" – Diana and Company
- "One (Reprise)/Finale" – Company

=== Original cast album ===
The original cast album was Issued by Columbia Records (PS33581).

==== Charts ====
Chart (1977)	Position
Australia (Kent Music Report)	47

== Notable casts ==
Character	Off-Broadway	Broadway	U.S. Tour	International Tour	West End	Broadway Revival	U.S. Tour	West End Revival
Character	1975		1976			2006	2005	2013
Zach	Robert LuPone	Robert LuPone	Robert LuPone	Eivind Harum	Eivind Harum	Michael Berresse	Michael Gruber	John Partridge
Larry	Clive Clerk	Clive Clerk	Roy Smith	T. Michael Reed	T. Michael Reed	Tyler Hanes	John Carroll	Alastair Postlethwaite
Don Kerr (#5)	Ron Kuhlman	Ron Kuhlman	Ron Kuhlman	Ronald Young	Ronald Young	Brad Anderson	Derek Hanson	Gary Watson
Maggie Winslow (#9)	Kay Cole	Kay Cole	Kay Cole	Jean Fraser	Jean Fraser	Mara Davi	Hollie Howard	Vicki Lee Taylor
Mike Costa (#81)	Wayne Cilento	Wayne Cilento	Don Correia	Jeff Hyslop	Jeff Hyslop	Jeffrey Schecter	Clyde Alves	Adam Salter
Connie Wong (#149)	Baayork Lee	Baayork Lee	Baayork Lee	Jennifer Ann Lee	Jennifer Ann Lee	Yuka Takara	Jessica Wu	Alexzandra Sarmiento
Greg Gardner (#67)	Michel Stuart	Michel Stuart	Michel Stuart	Andy Keyser	Mark Dovey	Michael Paternostro	Denis Lambert	Andy Rees
Cassie Ferguson	Donna McKechnie	Donna McKechnie	Donna McKechnie	Sandy Roveta	Sandy Roveta	Charlotte d’Amboise	Nikki Snelson	Scarlett Strallen
Sheila Bryant (#152)	Kelly Bishop	Kelly Bishop	Charlene Ryan	Jane Summerhays	Jane Summerhays	Deidre Goodwin	Emily Fletcher	Leigh Zimmerman
Bobby Mills (#84)	Thomas J. Walsh	Thomas J. Walsh	Scott Pearson	Ron Kurowski	Ron Kurowski	Ken Alan	Ian Liberto	Ed Currie
Bebe Benzenheimer (#37)	Nancy Lane	Nancy Lane	Nancy Lane	Miriam Welch	Miriam Welch	Alisan Porter	Pilar Millhollen	Daisy Maywood
Judy Turner (#23)	Patricia Garland	Patricia Garland	Patricia Garland	Yvette Mathews	Yvette Mathews	Heather Parcells	Stephanie Gibson	Lucy Adcock
Richie Walters (#44)	Ronald Dennis	Ronald Dennis	Ronald Dennis	A. Wellington Perkins	A. Wellington Perkins	James T. Lane	Anthony Wayne	James T. Lane
Al DeLuca (#17)	Don Percassi	Don Percassi	Don Percassi	Steve Baumann	Steve Baumann	Tony Yazbeck	Colt Prattes	Simon Hardwick
Kristine Urich-DeLuca (#10)	Renee Baughman	Renee Baughman	Renee Baughman	Christine Barker	Christine Barker	Chryssie Whitehead	Jessica Latshaw	Frances Dee
Val Clark (#179)	Pamela Blair	Pamela Blair	Pamela Blair	Mitzi Hamilton	Mitzi Hamilton	Jessica Lee Goldyn	Natalie Hall	Rebecca Herszenhon
Mark Anthony (#63)	Cameron Mason	Cameron Mason	Paul Charles	Tim Scott	Tim Scott	Paul McGill	Jay Armstrong Johnson	Harry Francis
Paul San Marco (#45)	Sammy Williams	Sammy Williams	Sammy Williams	Tommy Aguilar	Tommy Aguilar	Jason Tam	Kevin Santos	Gary Wood
Diana Morales (#2)	Priscilla Lopez	Priscilla Lopez	Priscilla Lopez	Loida Iglesias	Loida Iglesias	Natalie Cortez	Gabrielle Ruiz	Victoria Hamilton-Barritt

== Production history ==
The musical was formed from several taped workshop sessions with Broadway dancers, known as "gypsies," including eight who eventually appeared in the original cast. The sessions were originally hosted by dancers Michon Peacock and Tony Stevens. The first taped session occurred at the Nickolaus Exercise Center on January 26, 1974. They hoped that they would form a professional dance company to make workshops for Broadway dancers.

Michael Bennett was invited to join the group primarily as an observer, but quickly took control of the proceedings. Although Bennett's involvement has been challenged, there has been no question about Kirkwood and Dante's authorship. In later years, Bennett's claim that A Chorus Line had been his brainchild resulted not only in hard feelings but a number of lawsuits as well. During the workshop sessions, random characters would be chosen at the end for the chorus jobs based on their performance quality, resulting in a different "cast" being selected every run-through. However, several of the costumers objected to this ending, citing the stress of having to change random actors in time for the finale. This resulted in the ending being cut in exchange for the same set of characters being "cast." Marvin Hamlisch, who wrote A Chorus Line's score, recalled how, during the first previews, audiences seemed put off by something in the story. This problem was solved when actress Marsha Mason told Bennett that Cassie (Donna McKechnie in the original production) should win the part in the end because she did everything right. Bennett changed it so that Cassie would always win the part.

=== Original production ===
A Chorus Line opened Off-Broadway at The Public Theater on April 15, 1975. At the time, the Public did not have enough money to finance the production so it borrowed $1.6 million to produce the show. The show was directed by Bennett and co-choreographed by Bennett and Bob Avian. Advance word had created such a demand for tickets that the entire run sold out immediately. Producer Joseph Papp moved the production to Broadway, and on July 25, 1975, it opened at the Shubert Theatre, where it ran for 6,137 performances until April 28, 1990.

Additional Opening Night cast members Carole Schweid and John Mineo were understudies named "Barbara" and "Jarad", although they only went on covering other roles.

The production was nominated for 12 Tony Awards, winning nine: Best Musical, Best Musical Book, Best Score (Hamlisch and Kleban), Best Director, and Best Choreography, Best Actress (McKechnie), Best Featured Actor (Sammy Williams), Best Featured Actress (Bishop), and Best Lighting Design. The show won the 1976 Pulitzer Prize for Drama, one of the few musicals ever to receive this honor, swept nearly all the main categories at the 1976 Drama Desk Awards, and the New York Drama Critics' Circle Award for Best Play of the season.

In 1976, many of the original cast went on to perform in San Francisco. Open roles were recast, and the play was again reviewed as the "New" New York Company which included Ann Reinking, Sandahl Bergman, Christopher Chadman, Justin Ross (who would go on to appear in the film), and Barbara Luna.

When it closed, A Chorus Line was the longest running show in Broadway history until its record was surpassed by Cats in 1997. On September 29, 1983, Bennett and 332 A Chorus Line veterans gathered to celebrate the musical becoming the longest-running show in Broadway history.

Up to February 19, 1990, A Chorus Line had generated $146 million from its Broadway gross and $277 million in total U.S. grosses and had 6.5 million Broadway attendees. At the time, it was the second most profitable show in Broadway history after Cats with profits of $50 million (including ancillary income). 75% of the profits went to Papp's New York Shakespeare Festival and 25% to Bennett's Plum Productions. Since its inception, the show's many worldwide productions, both professional and amateur, have been a major source of income for The Public Theater that Papp had founded.

=== Subsequent productions ===
U.S. and international tours were mounted in 1976, including a sit-down engagement in Los Angeles at the Shubert Theatre.

A London production opened in the West End at the Theatre Royal Drury Lane in 1976, initially with the International Cast from the US, including Jane Summerhays as Sheila. The production ran for three years and won the Laurence Olivier Award as Best Musical of the Year in 1976, the first year the awards were presented. The original British cast took over in 1977. It included Jean-Pierre Cassel as Zach, Diane Langton as Diana Morales, Jeff Shankley as Al, Michael Staniforth as Paul, Stephen Tate as Greg (later replacing Cassel as Zach) and Geraldine Gardner (aka Trudi van Doorn of The Benny Hill Show) as Sheila. Elizabeth Seal was cast as Cassie but was replaced at the eleventh hour by her understudy Petra Siniawski who played the role for the entire British cast run.

The original Australian production opened in Sydney at Her Majesty's Theatre in May 1977 and moved to Melbourne's Her Majesty's Theatre in January 1978. The cast featured Peta Toppano as Diana, David Atkins as Mike, and Ross Coleman as Paul.

In 1980, under the direction of Roy Smith, the Teatro El Nacional of Buenos Aires produced a Spanish version of A Chorus Line lasting 10 months (and then only to make way for an already scheduled subsequent production).

In Spain, the show opened in December 1984 at Teatre Tívoli in Barcelona, directed by Roy Smith and translated into Spanish by Nacho Artime and Jaime Azpilicueta, before transferring to Teatro Monumental in Madrid.

In July 1986, A Chorus Line was produced in Italy for the first time. It premiered at the Nervi Festival of Dance in Genoa, followed by a five-week Italian tour. The choreography was adapted for the festival's performing space by Baayork Lee who had played Connie in the original production and subsequently became a close collaborator of Michael Bennett, the original choreographer.

The German-language version was again directed by Lee and first opened in 1987 in Vienna, Austria, where it ran for one season followed by the German-language CD release produced by Jimmy Bowien in 1988.

The first—and as of 2016 only—professional Hungarian production of the musical opened its limited run on March 25, 1988, under the title Michael Bennett emlékére (In Memory of Michael Bennett). It was performed by Ódry Színpad (the company of the Academy of Drama and Film in Budapest) translated into Hungarian by György Gebora, and directed by Imre Kerényi. The character Zach was renamed Michael and played by Kerényi.

The 2006 Broadway revival opened at the Gerald Schoenfeld Theater on October 5, 2006, following a run in San Francisco. The revival closed on August 17, 2008, after 759 performances and 18 previews. It cost $8 million to finance and recouped its investment in 19 weeks. The production was directed by Bob Avian, with the choreography reconstructed by Baayork Lee, who had played Connie Wong in the original Broadway production. The opening night cast included Paul McGill, Michael Berresse, Charlotte d'Amboise, Mara Davi, James T. Lane, Tony Yazbeck, Heather Parcells, Alisan Porter, Jason Tam, Jessica Lee Goldyn, Deidre Goodwin, and Chryssie Whitehead. On April 15, 2008, Mario Lopez joined the cast as the replacement for Zach. The production was the subject of the documentary film Every Little Step.

The production received two Tony Award nominations in 2007 for Featured Role (Charlotte d'Amboise) and Revival (Musical). The original contract for A Chorus Line provided for sharing the revenue from the show with the directors and dancers that had attended the original workshop sessions. However, the contract did not specify revenue when the musical was revived in 2006. In February 2008, an agreement was reached between the dancers and Michael Bennett's estate.

A 2008 U.S. touring production opened on May 4, 2008, at the Denver Center for the Performing Arts and toured through June 2009. This production featured Michael Gruber as Zach, Nikki Snelson as Cassie, Emily Fletcher as Sheila, and Gabrielle Ruiz as Diana.

In 2012, the musical toured Australia, gaining much critical acclaim. Baayork Lee directed the production and it gained many nominations, including Helpmann nominations for Best Actress in a Musical for West End star, Anita Louise Combe playing Cassie, Best supporting Actress in a musical, Deborah Krizak and Best supporting Actor in a musical, Euan Doidge and it won best musical. The same production and cast then came to Singapore, playing at the Marina Bay Sands, Sands Theater from May 4 to 27, 2012.

The show returned to London for a West End revival in February 2013 at the London Palladium, running through August of that year. It was directed by original choreographer Bob Avian, with John Partridge, Scarlett Strallen, and Victoria Hamilton-Barritt starring. James T. Lane is reprising his Broadway role and Leigh Zimmerman won the Laurence Olivier Award for Best Performance in a Supporting Role in a Musical for her portrayal of Sheila in this production. Producers announced on June 9, 2013, that the London revival cast would record a new cast album featuring never-before-heard songs which were written for the show but never made the final cut.

In 2015, the Original Broadway cast of Hamilton paid tribute to A Chorus Line's 40th anniversary and performed "What I Did For Love", with the original cast of A Chorus Line joining them onstage.

In 2016, reports indicated that a Broadway revival was being planned for 2025, in honor of the show's 50th anniversary.

For its annual fully staged musical event, the Hollywood Bowl produced a limited run of A Chorus Line from July 29–31, 2016, directed and choreographed by Baayork Lee. The cast included Sabrina Bryan as Valerie Clark, Robert Fairchild as Mike Costa, Spencer Liff as Larry, Ross Lynch as Mark Anthony, Mara Davi as Maggie Winslow, J. Elaine Marcos as Connie Wong, Jason Tam as Paul San Marco, Leigh Zimmerman as Sheila Bryant, Mario Lopez as Zach, Sarah Bowden as Cassie Ferguson, Krysta Rodriguez as Diana Morales, and Courtney Lopez as Kristine Ulrich.

In 2016, approval was granted to director Donna Feore to allow changes in choreography so the show could be performed for the first time on a thrust stage, in the Festival Theatre at the Stratford Festival of Canada.

In 2018, New York City Center presented A Chorus Line as their annual gala presentation. The production was directed by Bob Avian, co-choreographer of the original 1975 production, and choreographed by Baayork Lee, Broadway's original Connie Wong.

In 2019, a Spanish-language version of the musical premiered as part of the inaugural season of Teatro del Soho in Málaga, Spain, starring the theater's founder Antonio Banderas as Zach. Banderas also co-directed the musical with Baayork Lee.

The one-night special event A Chorus Line Official 50th Anniversary Celebration at the Shubert Theatre was staged July 27, 2025. Original 1975 Broadway cast members Kelly Bishop, Wayne Cilento, Baayork Lee, Priscilla Lopez, and Donna McKechnie participated, and included special performances by Charlotte d’Amboise, Ariana DeBose, and Bebe Neuwirth, among others. The performance was directed by Baayork Lee and included original choreography by Michael Bennett and Bob Avian. The performance benefited Entertainment Community Fund programs serving dancers.

== Awards and nominations ==
=== Original Broadway production ===
Year	Award	Category	Nominee	Result
1976	Tony Award	Best Musical		Won
1976	Tony Award	Best Book of a Musical	James Kirkwood Jr. and Nicholas Dante	Won
1976	Tony Award	Best Performance by a Leading Actress in a Musical	Donna McKechnie	Won
1976	Tony Award	Best Performance by a Featured Actor in a Musical	Sammy Williams	Won
1976	Tony Award	Best Performance by a Featured Actor in a Musical	Robert LuPone	Nominated
1976	Tony Award	Best Performance by a Featured Actress in a Musical	Kelly Bishop	Won
1976	Tony Award	Best Performance by a Featured Actress in a Musical	Priscilla Lopez	Nominated
1976	Tony Award	Best Original Score	Marvin Hamlisch and Edward Kleban	Won
1976	Tony Award	Best Direction of a Musical	Michael Bennett	Won
1976	Tony Award	Best Choreography	Michael Bennett and Bob Avian	Won
1976	Tony Award	Best Costume Design	Theoni V. Aldredge	Nominated
1976	Tony Award	Best Lighting Design	Tharon Musser	Won
1976	Drama Desk Award	Outstanding Musical		Won
1976	Drama Desk Award	Book of a Musical	James Kirkwood Jr. and Nicholas Dante	Won
1976	Drama Desk Award	Outstanding Actress in a Musical	Kelly Bishop	Won
1976	Drama Desk Award	Outstanding Actress in a Musical	Donna McKechnie	Won
1976	Drama Desk Award	Outstanding Director of a Musical	Michael Bennett	Won
1976	Drama Desk Award	Outstanding Choreography	Michael Bennett and Bob Avian	Won
1976	Drama Desk Award	Outstanding Music	Marvin Hamlisch	Won
1976	Drama Desk Award	Outstanding Lyrics	Edward Kleban	Won
1976	Pulitzer Prize for Drama			Won
1976	Theatre World Award	Special Award		Won
1976	New York Drama Critics' Circle Award	Best Musical		Won
1978	Gold Record Award from Columbia Records			Won
1984	Tony Award (special)	Longest-running Broadway musical		Won

=== Original London production ===
Year	Award	Category	Nominee	Result
1976	Laurence Olivier Award	Best New Musical		Won
1977	Evening Standard Theatre Award	Best Musical		Won

=== 2006 Broadway revival ===
Year	Award	Category	Nominee	Result
2007	Tony Award	Best Revival of a Musical		Nominated
2007	Tony Award	Best Performance by a Featured Actress in a Musical	Charlotte d'Amboise	Nominated

=== 2012 Australian revival ===
Year	Award	Category	Nominee	Result
2012	Helpmann Award	Best Musical		Won
2012	Helpmann Award	Best Actress in a Musical	Anita Louise Combe	Nominated

=== 2013 London revival ===
Year	Award	Category	Nominee	Result
2013	Laurence Olivier Award	Best Musical Revival		Nominated
2013	Laurence Olivier Award	Best Performance in a Supporting Role in a Musical	Leigh Zimmerman	Won

== Film adaptation ==
In 1975, the rights for a film were sold to Universal Pictures for $5.5 million plus 20% of the distributor's gross rentals above $30 million. Universal subsequently sold the rights to PolyGram. The film was released in 1985, starring Michael Douglas as Zach, Alyson Reed as Cassie, and Terrance Mann as Larry. The film was directed by Richard Attenborough with a screenplay by Arnold Schulman. It was produced by Cy Feuer and distributed by Columbia Pictures, Metro-Goldwyn-Mayer, and Universal Pictures.

The film received mixed reviews from critics and was a box office bomb, grossing $14 million on a $25 million budget. The songs "Hello Twelve, Hello Thirteen, Hello Love" and "The Music and the Mirror" were replaced with new songs, "Surprise, Surprise" and "Let Me Dance for You", written by Marvin Hamlisch and Edward Kleban. Additionally, "What I Did for Love" is a solo sung by Cassie instead of Diana and the company, and is recontextualized as a romance song instead of passion for one's craft. The songs "And...", "Sing!", "Mother", and "Gimme the Ball" were cut entirely.

== Notes ==
Preceded by Grease	Longest-running Broadway show 1983–1997	Succeeded by Cats
