= Nothing (A Chorus Line song) =

Nothing, also referred to as Montage Part 2, is a song from the musical A Chorus Line. It is sung by the Puerto Rican character Diana. "Nothing" was written in 1968 by Edward Kleban.

== Synopsis ==
CityBeat explains "Diana Morales...talks about a teacher who berated her". All About Theatre talks about "Diana's recollections of a horrible high school acting class". The Independent describes it as "an account of her humiliations at the hands of a high-school Method Acting teacher".

== Critical reception ==
The Arts Desk described it as "the song about theatrical pretension". Metro Theatre Arts wrote the song had "the essence of a star waiting to bloom". CT Theatre News and Reviews described the song as "dead-on and quite moving". The Independent called it "hilarious, gutsy to attack...that is one of the best songs in Marvin Hamlisch's snappy, agile score".
