= At the Ballet =

Song
- Released: 1975
- Composer(s): Marvin Hamlisch
- Lyricist(s): Edward Kleban

"At the Ballet" is a song from the musical A Chorus Line.

== Production ==
Changed for Good: A Feminist History of the Broadway Musical noted:

Composer Marvin Hamlisch said that the song set the tone for all the music in the show; once the song was written, the creators understood "the shape and color of the piece as a whole".

== Synopsis ==
The dancers explain their experiences with attending dance school, as well as family-related trauma. No matter how dark the rest of their world seems, they always feel happy and engaged "at the ballet".

Musicals101 explains "At the Ballet" as a "poignant tribute to the escape Sheila, Bebe, and Maggie found in the beauty of ballet."

== Analysis ==
Changed for Good: A Feminist History of the Broadway Musical explains: "Sheila, Bebe, and Maggie sing the same wistful melody; then their harmonies grow and build, one layering on the other".

== Critical reception ==
AussieTheatre.com described it as a "poignant song".

== In popular culture ==
The song was covered by the cast of Glee in the fourth season episode "Lights Out", performed by regular cast members Naya Rivera, Lea Michele and Chris Colfer with recurring guest star Sarah Jessica Parker. Barbra Streisand recorded the song in 2016 for her Encore: Movie Partners Sing Broadway album, with guest vocal performances by Anne Hathaway and Daisy Ridley.
