= Nicholas Dante =

American dancer and writer

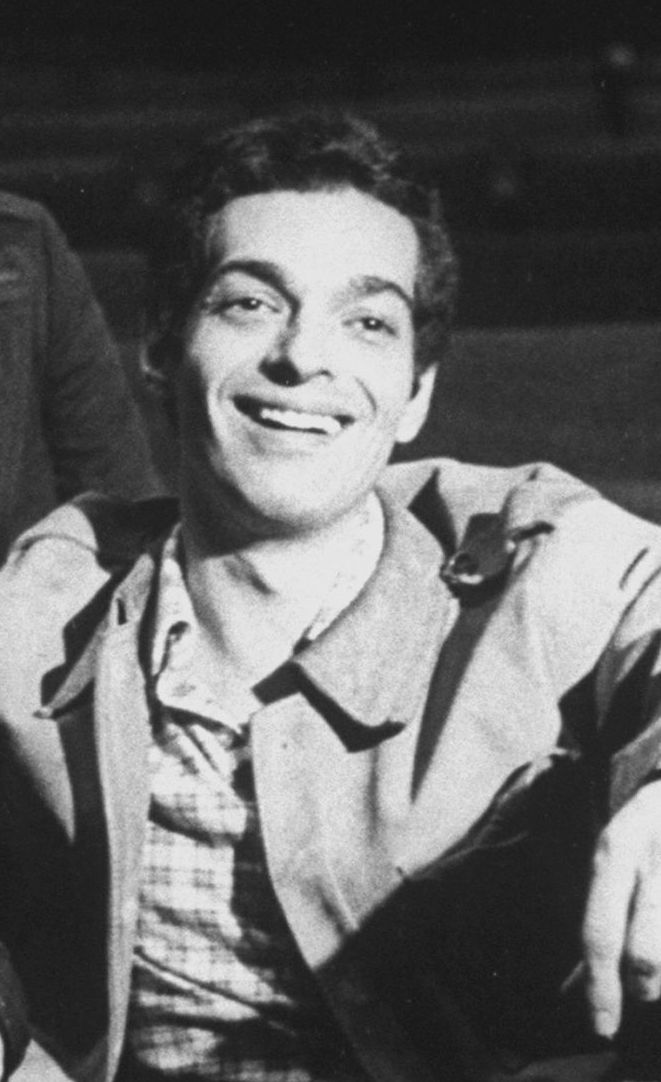
- Born: Conrado Morales; November 22, 1941; New York, New York, U.S.
- Died: May 21, 1991 (aged 49); New York, New York, U.S.
- Writing career
- Notable awards: Pulitzer Prize for Drama (1976); Tony Award for Best Book of a Musical (1976); Drama Desk Award for Outstanding Musical (1976)

Nicholas Dante (November 22, 1941 – May 21, 1991) was an American dancer and writer, best known for having co-written the book of the musical A Chorus Line. He was the first Latino to win a Pulitzer Prize for Drama.

== Biography ==
Born Conrado Morales in New York City to Puerto Rican parents, his early career was spent dancing in the chorus of Broadway musicals such as Applause and Ambassador.

In 1974, he was approached by his friend Michael Bennett who invited him to the sessions which led to the basis of material for the book of a musical about Broadway "gypsies", the dancers who serve as a backdrop for the leading performers. Eventually, collaborating with James Kirkwood Jr., the result was A Chorus Line, which earned him the 1976 Tony Award and Drama Desk Award for Best Book of a Musical and the Pulitzer Prize for Drama. In particular, the story of Paul, the gay Puerto Rican dancer whose early career consisted of working in a drag show, was based primarily on Dante. The actor who originated the role with the famous monologue, Sammy Williams, won a Tony Award for Best Featured Actor in a Musical award in 1976 for the role. Dante played the role himself later on.

He authored a screenplay, Fake Lady, and a stage musical based on the life of entertainer Al Jolson entitled Jolson Tonight, but never again achieved the success he did with A Chorus Line.

== Death ==
Dante died on May 21, 1991, aged 49, from AIDS-related complications in New York City.
