= I Hope I Get It =

Song from A Chorus Line

"I Hope I Get It" is a song from the musical A Chorus Line.

== Production ==
A Chorus Line premiered Off-Broadway at The Public Theater in May 1975. The musical moved to Broadway at the Shubert Theatre in July 1975.

== Synopsis ==
The dancers sing about their worries, fears, and doubts regarding a new job opportunity. Only a select few may be chosen, so they are trying to keep their cool under enormous pressure. They feel like everything they have done throughout their life had led up to this moment. The song features Zach (with spoken lines), Tricia (in a featured singing solo near the beginning) and Paul (in a featured singing solo at the end).

== Analysis ==
Musicals101 explains:

"I Hope I Get It" is a ten-minute sequence, one of the most exciting openings in all musical theatre. We are watching the beginning of the final phase of a Broadway tryout. A rehearsal piano plays as Bennett fills the stage with flying arms and legs, as groups of dancers in rehearsal clothes vanish and reappear. The dancers eventually surge forward into a line, holding their eight-by-ten inch head shots in front of them.

== Critical reception ==
Ken Mandelbaum, author of A Chorus Line and the Musicals of Michael Bennett, commented "This moment – one of the show's most celebrated – represents the perfect blend of theme, staging concept, musical underscoring, lighting, and set design that marks the entire evening".
