= Amaan Reza =

Bangladeshi film actor

- আমান রেজা
- Born: 20 May 1986 (age 39); Dhaka, Bangladesh
- Education: Law, LLM
- Alma mater: University of London International Programmes; The World University
- Occupation: Actor

Amaan Reza (Bengali: আমান রেজা; born 20 May 1986) is a Bangladeshi film actor.

== Early life and education ==
Reza was born and brought up in Dhaka, Bangladesh. He attended Motijheel Government Boys' High School. He graduated in LLB Law (Hons) from the University of London International Programmes. He is currently studying LLM at The World University.

Reza's father Abu Naser is a businessman and his mother Jahanara Begum is a judge in Jessore District. He is the eldest of three siblings, he has two younger sisters, Samina and Safina Wahid.

== Acting career ==
Reza met film producer Golam Morshed through photographer L K Liton with whom he got acquainted in a studio in Paltan in 2008. From that meeting, Reza acted in his first film Shei Tufan directed by Hafiz Uddin. Reza acted in his second movie Valobashar shesh Nei directed by Reja Latif, which was Reza's first Bangla film to be released.

In 2013, he acted in 29 films in Bangla cinema including, Zakir Khan's Ranga Mon, Faruk Hossain's Kaktarua, MA Rahim's Murder II, Minhaj Kibria's Shotorupe Shotobar and Teg, Ahmed Ahmed Ali Mondal's Probashir Prem, Munsur Ali's Shongram, G Sarkar's Jaan, Anwar Siraj's Vabir Ador and Rikiya Masudo's The Story of Samara.

In March 2016, Reza started in the film Vromor, his first time as an anti-hero, directed by Sohel Arman.

In January 2017, he started working in the film Shesh Bella, directed by Sushant Mandal and Bishnu Maity. In May of the same year, Amaan worked in a small film Nodi Kabbo, directed by Mohammad Hossain Jaimy. In August 2017, Amaan started in two films simultaneously, Aleya and Gorum Cha. In September 2017, he began acting in Jhora Palak directed by Sayantan Mukherjee, a biographical film on the famous poet Jibanananda Das.

In January 2018, Reza began his role in Nayok, a flm directed by Ispahani Arif Jahan. In February, he took the title role in Gontobbo a film directed by Aranya Polash, followed up by Sultan: The Saviour which was a joint venture film between Bangladesh and India. Reza has also completed the action film Before I Die.

== Filmography ==
Year	Title	Role	Notes	Ref.
2013	Premik Number One	Amaan		
2014	Shongram	Karim		
2018	Nayok	Shiab		
2018	Sultan: The Saviour	Aahir	Indian Bengali film	
2019	Kia and Cosmos	Anup	Indian Bengali film	
2019	Gohiner Gaan	Amaan		
2021	Gontobbyo			
2022	Before I Die	Danny Shah	Also as executive producer	
2025	Mayna			

== Music career ==
In 2015, Reza worked with British singer Rubayyat Jahan and Raja Kaasheff on a music video.

== Personal life ==
Reza is Single.
