= The Spectacular Jihad of Taz Rahim =

- Theatrical Release Poster
- Directed by: Raghav Murali
- Produced by: Zaki Hossain
- Starring: Rahsaan Noor; Monica Dogra
- Cinematography: Titus Fox
- Music by: Rusho Mahtab; Navin Kundra; Bilal Khan
- Production company: Onai Entertainment
- Distributed by: Ziryab Films
- Release dates: 15 April 2015 (Los Angeles); 29 May 2015 (United States)
- Running time: 113 Minutes
- Countries: India glish Hindi

The Spectacular Jihad of Taz Rahim is a 2015 Indian crime drama film directed by Raghav Murali and produced by Zaki Hossain. The film stars Rahsaan Noor, Monica Dogra, Kal Parekh, and Sorab Wadia in pivotal roles. The film is loosely inspired by true stories of the NYPD, FBI, and CIA's use of Muslim informants. The film was produced in English and in Hindi and premiered in the United States 15 April 2015.

== Plot ==
Sabrina Jiwan is filming a news piece about a Muslim informant who was encouraged by the NYPD to entrap his victims. She proceeds to interview the informant, Taz Rahim, where he discloses his story.

Six months earlier, Taz was a struggling rapper living in Jackson Heights, New York, an immigrant Bangladeshi neighborhood. To make ends meet he sells marijuana and is one day arrested by an undercover cop. Around the same time, Sabrina receives permission from Mo Khan to make a documentary about his congressional campaign. Later he is revealed to have impregnated his mistress.

After spending a few days incarcerated, Taz meets with the undercover cop, whose real name is Nick Patel. Nick threatens to deport Taz unless he agrees to work as a Muslim informant. Taz proceeds to get involved with the neighborhood mosque under the guise that he is trying to turn his life around. While working with his new friends, Taz's path collides with Sabrina's. On the recommendation of Ali Uncle, Sabrina decides to hire Taz as an intern for her documentary.

As time passes on, discussions prompted by Taz concern his friends at the mosque. They decide to report to the NYPD and Nick Patel that they believe Taz is a terrorist planning a terror attack. News of accusation spreads through the community and Mo asks Sabrina to fire Taz from her documentary. Nick is also thinking about removing Taz from the operation after the embarrassment but Taz is able to convince Nick to give him one more chance. Taz then convinces Ali Uncle to talk to Mo about giving Taz another chance. In a private discussion, Mo requests Taz to murder his mistress.

Taz feels that he has enough evidence to arrest Mo but is rebutted by Nick, whom wants to arrest Mo for terrorism not murder. Nick encourages Taz to pretend to move forward with Mo's request in an attempt to uncover real terrorist activities. Unsure whom to trust, Taz moves forward with the plot to murder Mo's mistress and then goes missing.

Nick begins to feel the heat from his superiors and interviews Sabrina about Taz's disappearance and his connection to the murders of two women at a local strip club. Sabrina does not have any information. Later she is confronted by Taz on the street where he reveals the truth to Sabrina that he is being framed by Mo. Eventually, she is convinced of Taz's innocence and she plans to help him gain his freedom by having him confess to being an informant.

Back in the present, Sabrina releases her interview with Taz. In a final showdown, Taz is able to get Mo arrested with an admission of guilt and the help of Nick. In the end, it is revealed that Taz faked the murder of Mo's mistress in an effort to put pressure on Nick to arrest Mo. Taz now has his freedom but is scarred by all things he did to let people down in his life.

== Cast ==
- Rahsaan Noor as Taz Rahim
- Monica Dogra as Sabrina Jiwan
- Kal Parekh as Nick Patel
- Sorab Wadia as Mo Khan
- Sana Serrai as Meera
- Farah Bala as Yasmina Khan
- Lipica Shah as Natasha
- Marc Goldberg as Roy Kellogg
- Gerrard Lobo as Imran Qureshi
- Subhan Choudhury as Ali Uncle
- Kabir Chopra as Asad
- Nikita Chaudhry as Samira

== Production ==
=== Casting ===
After watching Simanaheen, Zaki Hossain approached Rahsaan Noor to cast the latter in a film they would make together. The result of their collaboration was the script of The Spectacular Jihad of Taz Rahim, which was finalized in February 2014. Kal Parekh and Sana Serrai were next to be cast. Parekh was noticed by the casting team by his work in ABC Television's Pan Am and Serrai was noticed after being named one of the "ten sexiest Indian models who wooed America" by Technology magazine. The producers had a desire to work with Monica Dogra ever since the release of her Star World television show The Dewarists and were able to cast her in the lead role of The Spectacular Jihad of Taz Rahim.

=== Filming ===
Shooting for The Spectacular Jihad of Taz Rahim began in June 2014 in New York City. The film was shot exclusively in the city until August 2014 and took place in every borough of New York City except for the Bronx.
