= Before I Die (film) =

- Poster
- Directed by: Minhaj Kibriyah
- Written by: Minhaj Kibriyah & Ifte Amed (co-writer)
- Screenplay by: Minhaj Kibriyah
- Produced by: Movie Mad & Adworks; Amaan Reza (Executive Producer)
- Starring: Ifte Amed; Affri Selina; Shimul Khan; Laboni Marma; Shanku Panja; Amaan Reza; Shampa Reza
- Narrated by: MD Mohasin Hossain Dipu Howlader
- Cinematography: Enamul Sohail Haque
- Edited by: Sattyajit Gazmer
- Music by: Dobromir Kisyov; Aydin Ayaan Ahmed (Theme Music); Sattya Manik Afsar (Original Background Music)
- Production companies: Adworks & Movie Mad
- Release date: 10 July 2022
- Countries: Bangladesh; United Kingdom
- Languages: Bangla; English

Before I Die is a 2022 Bangladeshi Bengali English-language film. It is a martial arts thriller film directed by Minhaj Kibriyah, starring Ifte Amed and Affri Selina in the lead roles. The principal photography of the film began on 25 December 2019, and the film will have a simultaneous release in Bangladesh, the US, the UK, and India.

It is actor Ifte Amed's first leading role in a feature film.

== Summary ==
Before I Die tells the story of a highly skilled, dehumanized assassin who has an emotional and spiritual awakening. Then becomes a savior of a nation.

== Cast ==
- Ifte Amed as Roy
- Affri Selina as Joya
- Amaan Reza as Danny Shah
- Shimul Khan as
- Laboni Marma as Monica
- Shanku Panja as Sultan Gazi
- Shampa Reza as Helen

== Production ==
Minhaj Kibriyah, director of films like Surinagar and Shotorupe Shotobar, decided to make a Bangla martial arts film matching international standards. The film was announced as Before I Die. Bangladeshi actor Amaan Reza joined the film as executive producer. The production team focused on Ifte Amed, a professional critic award-winning British actor of Bangladeshi origin. Ifte Amed was a professional footballer for Sporting Bengal United F.C. and winner of the first Mr Asia UK modelling contest as the leading man. Actress Shampa Reza and Laboni Marma joined the cast later. Actress Affri Selina was signed as the leading lady of the film. Action director Abjol Miah integrated Filipino fight action combat in the movie, for which actor Ifte Amed had to undergo training for more than one and a half years under Abjol Miah. The film was shot at different locations in London, Sylhet, Dhaka and Comilla, with the pack up announced on 15 November 2021, and the post-production was done in Bollywood Mumbai. This was a collaborative teamwork by creatives in the UK, Bangladesh, India and Bulgaria. The world premiere of the film was held at London Genesis Cinema on 10 July 2022, attended by personalities like Dabirul Islam and Anwar Choudhury.

== Soundtrack ==
No.	Title	Singer(s)	Length
1.	"Nishshash Cholena"	S I Tutul, Rizia Parveen	04:40
2.	"Kotha Kotha"	Nirjer Chowdhury, Mithi	03:38
3.	"Thread connection"	Arnob Islam, Mithi	04:17
Total length:			12:58
