= Bengali Beauty =

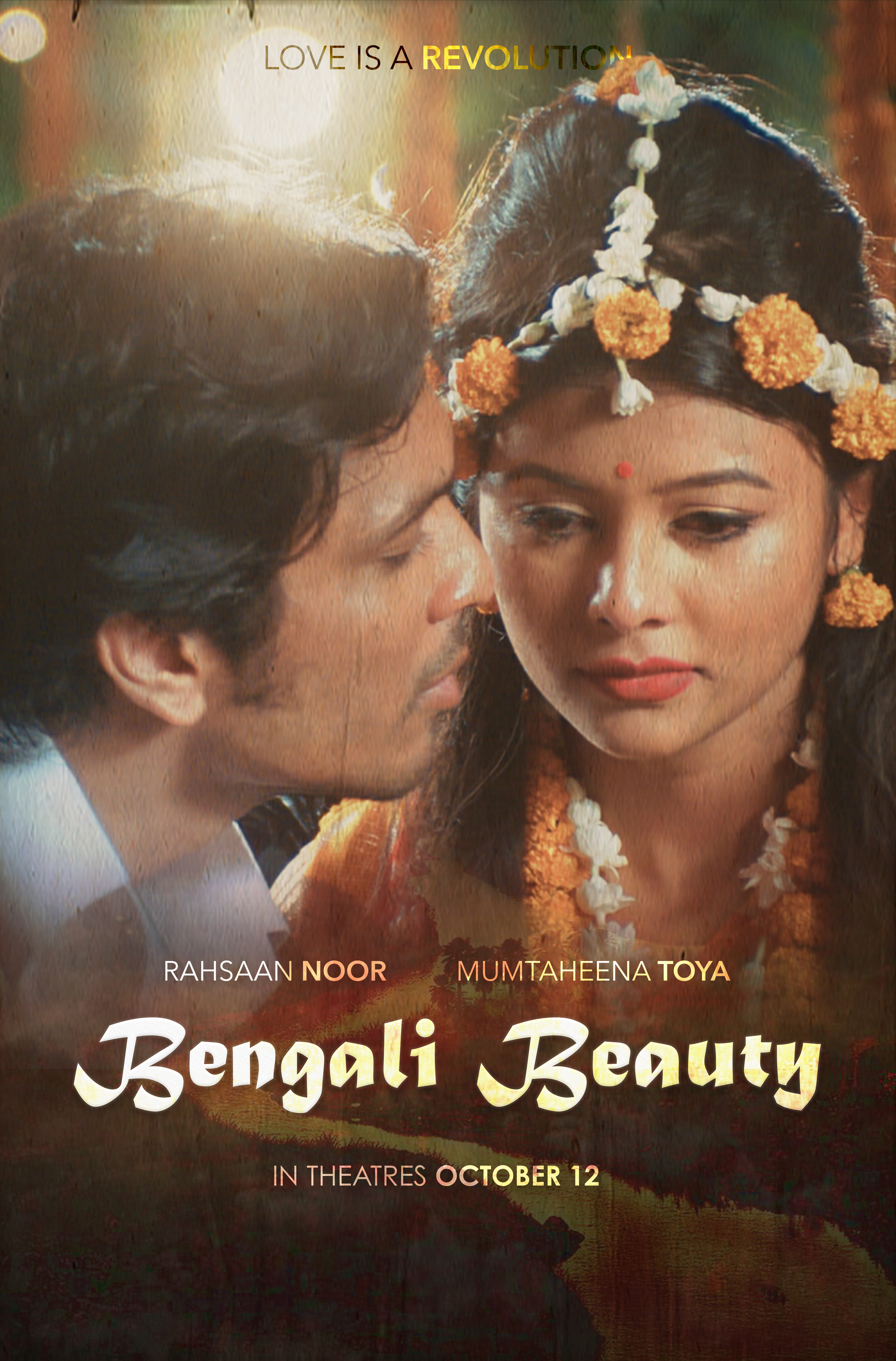
- Theatrical release poster
- Bengali: বাঙালি বিউটি
- Directed by: Rahsaan Noor
- Written by: Rahsaan Noor
- Produced by: Ridwan Islam; Ahad Bhai
- Starring: Rahsaan Noor; Mumtaheena Toya; Sarah Alam; Ashfique Rizwan
- Cinematography: Reghu Shanker
- Music by: Rusho Mahtab
- Production company: Ziryab Films
- Distributed by: Ziryab Films; Guangzhou Fashion Industry Culture Development Co. Ltd.
- Release dates: 16 February 2018 (United States); 12 October 2018 (Bangladesh)
- Running time: 104 minutes
- Country: Bangladesh
- Language: Bengali
- Budget: $60,000
- Box office: $21.4 million

Bengali Beauty (Bengali: বাঙালি বিউটি) is a Bangladeshi period romantic comedy-drama film written and directed by Rahsaan Noor. It stars Noor as a brash radio deejay and Mumtaheena Toya as a demure medical student, who fall in love in Dhaka during a politically turbulent 1975. Sarah Alam and Ashfique Rizwan make their feature film debuts in supporting roles.

After being offered a film set during the Bangladesh famine of 1974 and told that the early years after the Bangladesh Liberation War had never been explored in film before, Noor instead became creatively curious to explore the political turmoil in the aftermath of the famine. The inspiration to write the script for Bengali Beauty came to him after one day hearing Can't Take My Eyes Off You by Frankie Valli. To research for the film, Noor sourced stories from his family and family friends about what it was like growing up in post-independence Bangladesh, including a series of interviews with his aunt, actress Mita Rahman, who used to be a DJ for the popular World Music program on Bangladesh Betar. Filming took place in Dhaka in May 2017, with the film's music and score being composed by Rusho Mahtab.

Initially scheduled to release in Bangladesh on 9 February 2018, Bengali Beauty was banned by the Bangladesh Film Censor Board and became the center of controversy. However, the film went on to release in the United States on 16 February 2018, and received widespread critical acclaim, with praise directed at Noor's screenplay and direction, the performances of Noor, Alam, and Rizwan, the score, musical numbers, cinematography, and production design. In June 2018, the Bangladesh Appeal Board overturned the Censor Board's ban, and the film was released in Bangladesh on 12 October 2018. Bengali Beauty was then released in the United Kingdom on 23 November 2018 and in China on 3 May 2019. The film was a record-breaking commercial success, grossing $21.4 million worldwide on a production budget of $60,000, while becoming the first Bengali-language film ever to release in China, the United Kingdom, and the United States. The film also started the trend of movies depicting historical events from recent Bangladeshi history, including the 15 August 1975 Bangladesh coup d'état and assassination of Sheikh Mujibur Rahman.

== Plot ==
In 1975 Dhaka, Moyna Iftekhar takes her studies as a medical student seriously. Her only escape being books and movies, Moyna idolises Sofia Loren. Her father, Brigadier General K.M. Iftekhar, in a conversation with a friend, agrees to invite a family home to meet Moyna. After meeting Nadeem (Kazi Asif Rahman) and his family, Iftekhar and his wife Moshfeka (Naila Azad) agree to arrange Nadeem and Moyna's marriage. Moyna agrees to the proposal obediently.

Around this time, an angsty Afzal Khan returns to Bangladesh after having studied in the United States for four years. Using his father's connections, Afzal joins DJ Mita Rahman as a DJ for the popular World Music program at Bangladesh Betar, much to the chagrin of the show's producer, Rafel. Afzal's presentation and radio play 'Bengali Beauty' instantly become a hit with the youth of Dhaka, including Moyna.

Moyna's wedding date is set for 15 August, and her family merrily moves forward with wedding preparations. However, Moyna finds excuses and ways to sneak away to listen to Afzal and Mita's ever more popular radio show. At the library during one show, Moyna reflects on a photo of her and Afzal – taken years before. It's a picture similar to a scenario narrated by Afzal on the radio. Later that day, Moyna goes to donate supplies to a supply drive called by DJ Afzal and DJ Mita. And there, amidst all the fans, Bengali Babu (Afzal) and Bengali Beauty (Moyna) are reunited.

Soon thereafter, Afzal learns of Moyna's upcoming marriage. In a fit of frustration and rage, Afzal rants against the existing government and societal problems on air, leading promptly to his suspension. A gleeful Rafel takes Afzal's place next to DJ Mita on the World Music program. Moyna is devastated to hear the news of Afzal's suspension, not knowing what will happen to him. The people of Dhaka write to complain about Rafel's presentation, and Mita pleads with the DG of Bangladesh Betar to bring Afzal back.

Afzal is reinstated, and a more subdued version of his radio personality is back on air with Mita. Upon hearing Afzal back on the radio, Moyna calls Afzal, and they make a plan to run away together and elope before Moyna's wedding the next day. However, their plans fall apart as Prime Minister Sheikh Mujibur Rahman is assassinated the very next morning. After sneaking through the streets of Dhaka and then to Bangladesh Betar, a devastated Afzal announces the news over the radio. Moyna listens, and both weep at their lost hope of a future together.

One week later, Moyna listens as DJ Mita presents the World Music program solo. Mita talks about missing her friend Afzal, who has left to continue his studies in the United States, and narrates her version of the ending of 'Bengali Beauty'. A dream sequence unfolds in which Moyna imagines what might have been had her relationship with Afzal continued. Moyna sheds a tear as Mita completes her poignant narration.

== Cast ==
- Rahsaan Noor as Afzal Khan, aka RJ Afzal
- Mumtaheena Toya as Moyna
- Sarah Alam as Mita Rahman, aka RJ Mita
- Ashfique Rizwan as Rafel, producer of World Music
- Masum Basher as Siraj Haider Khan, Afzal's father and editor of the Observer newspaper
- GM Shahidul Alam as Muzzaqir, director general of Bangladesh Betar
- Naziba Basher as Tushi, Moyna's cousin
- Naila Azad as Moshfeka, Moyna's mother
- Pijush Bandyopadhyay as K.M. Iftekhar, Moyna's father and brigadier general in the Bangladesh Army
- Kazi Asif Rahman as Nadeem, Moyna's fiancé
- Aref Syed as Wasif Chowdhury, Afzal's friend

== Production ==
=== Development ===
Noor became inspired to write the script for Bengali Beauty one day after hearing Can't Take My Eyes Off You by Frankie Valli. The setting of the film came to him from a film that had been offered to him before as well as a series of interviews with his aunt, actress Mita Rahman, who used to be a DJ for the popular World Music program on Bangladesh Betar. Bangladesh Betar and World Music are central to the film's narrative. The style and tone of the film was inspired by Hollywood Vietnam War movies such as Apocalypse Now, Good Morning Vietnam, and Full Metal Jacket, as well as Bollywood classics such as Silsila and Dilwale Dulhania Le Jayenge.

The film was first announced at CinemaCon in Las Vegas, Nevada, in May 2016. Ridy Sheikh was originally cast as Moyna; however, she was later replaced by Toya.

=== Filming ===
The principal photography commenced on 2 May 2017 and lasted for one month. Bengali Beauty was shot on location at various iconic settings in Dhaka, such as Bangladesh Betar, the University of Dhaka, and Notre Dame College, among others, as these locations had remained without renovation since the 1970s and were authentic to the film's script.

== Reception ==
=== Box office ===
Bengali Beauty grossed US$546,000 in the United States, £334,000 in the United Kingdom, and $20.4 million in China for a worldwide total of US$21.4 million, against a production budget of $60,000. By the end of its theatrical run, the film had become the first Bengali film ever to release in the United States, the United Kingdom, and China, and the highest-grossing Bengali film ever at the worldwide box office.

Bengali Beauty began its theatrical release in the United States with a limited release in nine Regal Theaters and AMC Theatres in six cities on 16 February 2018. It made $92,592 in its opening weekend and would expand to additional cities and theaters in the following week. The film was next released in Bangladesh on 12 October 2018, in two theaters in Dhaka and Chittagong. The film earned BDT 600,000 from sold-out shows in Bangladesh despite only being scheduled for one show a day (at 2 PM) for one week at Dhaka's STAR Cineplex and Chittagong's Silver Screen. The following month, the film was released in the UK's Vue and Cineworld cinemas on 23 November 2018, and ran for two weeks. On 3 May 2019, Bengali Beauty became the first Bengali-language movie to theatrically release in China, releasing under the Chinese title 金色的孟加拉 (pinyin: Jīnsè de mèngjiālā, "Golden Bengal"). The film ran in Chinese theaters for seven weeks on as many as 700 screens.

=== Critical response ===
Bengali Beauty received widespread critical acclaim, with praise going toward Noor's screenplay and direction, the score, musical numbers, cinematography, production design, and the performances of Noor, Alam, and Rizwan. Faraz Hossain of Prothom Alo described Bengali Beauty as "a movie that touches the heart" and complimented its writing and direction. He further stated, "Outside the traditional Bengali film, this film brings a different taste. There is no need to say this to anyone. The movie itself is saying this to the viewer." Smita Bannerjee of Brown Girl Magazine similarly lauded the filmmaking, stating, "Bengali Beauty sweeps you away on waves of humor, heartbreak, and ravishing romance." She went on to name it her favourite movie of the year, awarding the film four out of five stars. Sanjay Pati of Urban Asian described the film as "daring and beautiful", in addition to highlighting Noor and Alam's performances, stating, "The film comes alive when DJ Afzal (Noor) and DJ Mita (Sarah Alam) take the mic." Despite being less enthusiastic about Toya's and Bandyopadhyay's performances, Pati nevertheless gave the film four out of five stars, declaring it "a welcome gift of vintage goods in a dazzling new package." Dick Johnson of NBC News added in praise of Noor, calling him "one the great new talents of our time."

Nice Noor of NTV documented audience response in Bangladesh, with one audience member stating that "watching Bengali Beauty felt like watching a Hollywood movie. The making and direction were excellent. Rahsaan Noor's acting was the best." Another audience member remarked, "I watched a good Bangla movie after a long time. Rahsaan and Sarah [Alam's] acting was outstanding. Toya suited her character very well."

In the United Kingdom, Qasa Alom of BBC Asian Network likened Noor's direction to that of a "Satyajit Ray film," while Syed Rumman of NTV Europe praised the film, stating, "In a word, Rahsaan Noor's talented entry is an extraordinary addition to Bengali cinema."

=== Accolades ===
==== Awards and nominations ====
Awards	Date of ceremony	Category	Recipient and Nominee	Result	Ref
21st Meril Prothom Alo Awards	26 April 2018	Best Newcomer	Mumtaheena Toya	Nominated	
1st Bharat Bangladesh Film Awards	22 October 2019	Best Supporting Actress	Sarah Alam	Nominated	

==== China Fashion Awards ====
On 30 June 2019, at the China Fashion Awards, Noor was honored and recognized for Bengali Beauty's commercial success in the country.

== Controversy ==
On 21 March 2018, the Bangladesh Film Censor Board banned the film from release in Bangladesh, claiming that the film's title was unsuitable and that the film "distorted history" among a multitude of objections. Noor appealed against the Censor Board's decision, and on 5 June, the Appeal Committee overturned the board's ban, citing the freedom of speech and expression.

On 5 October 2018, the film's distributor in Bangladesh, Jaaz Multimedia, abdicated from its obligation to release Bengali Beauty. Several prominent journalists noted that producers and distributors had colluded with cinema hall owners, including Jaaz Multimedia and Star Cineplex, to prevent Bengali Beauty from releasing in theaters in order to keep competition out of the market. After public pressure, the film was eventually released on 12 October 2018, to sold-out shows and audience acclaim before being abruptly pulled from the schedule again one week later. Noor would note that the experience left him "more embarrassed than he had ever felt in his life."
