= Rahsaan Noor =

American film actor (born 1986)

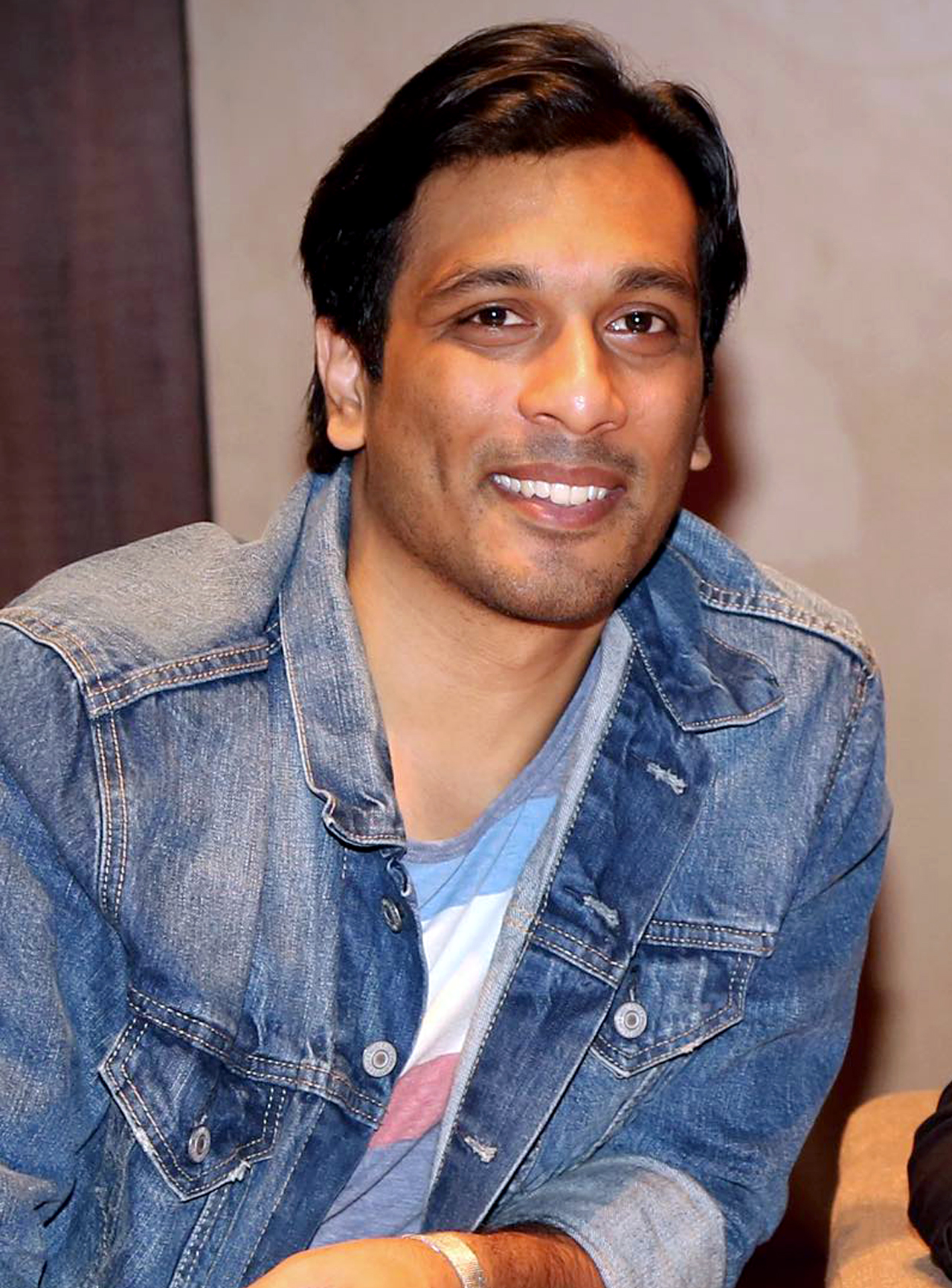
- Noor at event for Bengali Beauty in 2018
- Born: Rahsaan Nur Islam; September 24, 1986 (age 40); Chicago, Illinois, US
- Education: Lake Forest College; UCLA
- Occupations: Actor; director; writer
- Years active: 2013–present

Rahsaan Nur Islam (Bengali: রাহশান নূর ইসলাম; born September 24, 1986), known as Rahsaan Noor (English: /ˈrɑː(h)ʃɑːn ˈnʊər/ RAH-(h)shahn NOOR), is an American actor, director, and writer known for his work in the Bengali film industry. He made his debut in Simanaheen (2013) and broke out to gain international recognition in 2018 for acting in and directing the commercially successful romance Bengali Beauty.

Born and raised in Chicago, Noor began his career by acting in commercials for Bengali and Bangladeshi television. His first film role was a supporting character in the independent American social drama Promise Land (2013), and in another early role, he went on to star in the crime drama The Spectacular Jihad of Taz Rahim (2015). Noor has been credited with "putting new-age Bengali cinema on a global map," and has been further recognized by many to be "one of the great new talents of our time."

Aside from acting, Noor played Division III college basketball at Lake Forest College. He is also active in social and economic development initiatives, working with BRAC (organization) as well as Muhammad Yunus to promote social business, in addition to supporting schools for underprivileged children in Dhaka and his father's ancestral home in Chandpur, Bangladesh.

== Early life ==
Noor was born on September 24, 1986, in Chicago, Illinois, the oldest son of Munir Islam, a software engineer, and Rakhshanda Munir, a physician. His parents are Bangladeshi immigrants to the United States and he grew up in Chicago with his younger brother, Ridwan. From a young age, Noor's parents kept him in touch with their culture by teaching him to read and write Bengali as well as by including him in local Bangladeshi cultural events where he would recite poetry and act in stage plays. Noor's paternal grandfather is journalist and author Nurul Islam Patwari, the former editor of The Daily Ittefaq and Dainik Bangla newspapers and founder of Bichitra magazine. His maternal grandfather, Chowdhury Mahtabuddin, was the managing director of Adamjee Jute Mills. He is also the great-grandnephew of former Prime Minister of Bangladesh, Mizanur Rahman Chowdhury.

Growing up, Noor's first love was basketball. So much so, he "would sleep with his basketball." At 16, Noor was recruited for a role in a Disney campaign. After successfully auditioning, Noor passed on the opportunity to instead focus his attention on his basketball aspirations. He has said that at that age he was "constantly afraid of rejection," questioned whether he was good enough for acting, and "foolish" to think his "macho athlete street cred would be ruined by acting on the Disney channel." Despite his early hesitance to pursue acting, Noor was inspired by the experience and would end up taking creative writing and acting classes while still in high school. He would go on to play Division III college basketball at Lake Forest College and participate in the Midwest Conference Championship game in 2007. Playing the point guard position for the team, he was named an Academic All-American. Noor graduated from college with magna cum laude honors in economics and international relations. While in college, Noor had internships with current United States Senator Tammy Duckworth and Nobel Peace Prize Laureate Muhammad Yunus; calling the latter "a life-altering experience."

In college, Noor also began experimenting with filmmaking. Encouraged by the praise he received for his short films, Noor produced, directed, and acted in Kings of Devon, a full-length feature film that he made with friends and family to raise money for a charitable school in Dhaka, Bangladesh. Initially planning to screen the film at a local community center, Noor received an offer to release it theatrically in four US cities. The film's release coincided with the loss of his financial analyst job, and Noor decided to then focus on his acting career.

== Career ==
=== Career beginnings (2011–2017) ===
While still working as a financial analyst, Noor began work on his first Bengali language feature film Kings of Devon. He would later describe the movie as an "amateur film" that he made with his "home movie camera on the weekends with friends and family." Made on a budget of US$3,000, the film still managed a theatrical release in four US cities and successfully raised money for the charitable school supported by Noor. After losing his financial analyst job, Noor began focusing on his acting career and appeared in several commercials on Bengali and Bangladeshi television. Noor was also cast in a supporting role in the independent English language American film Promise Land directed by Kevin Dalvi.

In 2013, Noor brought together a group of Bangladeshi Americans from around the United States to make Simanaheen with the aim of producing a Bengali film with "higher production value" for the "global market." The romantic drama depicting a Hindu-Muslim relationship across eras was co-directed by Noor's Promise Land director, Kevin Dalvi, and Ria Mahtab. Noor featured in a double role, portraying a young Hindu man in 1947 Calcutta and a young Muslim man in modern-day Chicago. Simanaheen went on to release in the United States and Bangladesh, and declared a hit after becoming a commercial success. Noor's performance received critical acclaim, with the Deccan Herald crediting Noor "for putting new-age Bengali cinema on a global map." For his work in the film, Noor was presented with the Outstanding Contributions to Bengali Cinema Award by the Bengali Writers Association.

Following Simanaheen, Noor moved to Los Angeles and enrolled in UCLA to study acting, directing, and the movie business in greater detail. During this time he was unable to sign with an agent and found it difficult to find work because he was not getting invited to audition for roles either. Instead, two angel investors came together with Noor to make the 2015 crime drama movie, The Spectacular Jihad of Taz Rahim. The film was directed by Raghav Murali, with Noor and Monica Dogra in the lead cast. Though the film was a commercial and critical failure, Noor's portrayal of a struggling rapper turned NYPD informant was described by the New Indian Express as a "charming, fun, and exciting experience," and that Noor "is a global desi on the cusp of becoming a dominant global player." Grazia India added that Noor is "an actor on-the-brink-of-fame." Noor has described working with Dogra, Kal Parekh, and Sorab Wadia in the film as the "pivotal learning experience that helped [him] improve as an actor."

=== Breakthrough (2018–present) ===
In 2018, Noor broke out to gain international attention after starring in and directing Bengali Beauty. Noor made the decision to produce, direct, and star in the film because he felt "embarrassed" and "frustrated" with the failure of The Spectacular Jihad of Taz Rahim as well as the direction of his career, and wanted to "prove" that he could "make a good movie." The film saw him portray the character of a brash radio DJ that challenges authority and romances a demure medical student (Mumtaheena Toya) during the politically turbulent year of 1975 in Bangladesh. Bengali Beauty opened in the United States in February 2018 and grossed $546,000 at the box office. Sanjay Pati of Urban Asian likened Noor's direction to that of "a capable bandleader or stage illusionist" who "knows how to structure a story." Smita Bannerjee of Brown Girl Magazine added that Noor's performance "oozes with charm," while Dick Johnson of NBC News praised Noor as "one of the great new talents of our time."

In Bangladesh, however, the Noor directorial became the center of much controversy after the Bangladesh Film Censor Board banned the film in March 2018, claiming it "distorted history" amongst its multitude of objections. The ban was overturned in June 2018 after Noor appealed the ruling, but, he still struggled to release the movie in the country. In October 2018, several prominent journalists noted that producers and distributors had colluded with cinema hall owners, including Jaaz Multimedia and Star Cineplex, to prevent Bengali Beauty from releasing in theaters in order to keep competition out of the market. After public pressure, the film eventually released on October 12, 2018, to sold-out shows and audience acclaim before being abruptly pulled from the schedule again one week later. Noor would note that the experience left him "more embarrassed than he had ever felt in his life." Bengali Beauty would go on to release in the United Kingdom in November 2018 with Qasa Alom of BBC Asian Network likening Noor's direction to that of a "Satyajit Ray film." In May 2019, the film released in China and became the first Bengali language film in history to release in the United States, United Kingdom, and China. Bengali Beauty grossed $21.4 million at the worldwide box office.

Noor will next star in the musical romance film Coco & Nut.

== Personal life ==
Aside from acting, Noor continues to play basketball regularly and is an avid fan of the NBA. He considers Michael Jordan and Kobe Bryant his childhood idols, and Clint Eastwood as his career inspiration. Noor is also active in social and economic development initiatives, working with BRAC as well as Muhammad Yunus to promote social business. He also provides support to schools for underprivileged children in Dhaka and his father's ancestral home in Chandpur.

== Filmography ==
Key
†	Denotes films that have not yet been released

Year	Title	Role	Notes
2010	Kings of Devon	Johnny	Bengali film; also director, writer, and producer
2013	Simanaheen	Amar/Raiyan	Bengali film; double role
2013	Promise Land	Asad Khan	
2015	The Spectacular Jihad of Taz Rahim	Taz Rahim	
2018	Bengali Beauty	Afzal Khan	Bengali film; also director, writer, and producer
2025	Coco & Nut †		Pre-production; also director

== See also ==
- List of Asian Americans
