= Mario Carrozzo =

British businessman and housing provider

- Occupations: Businessman, property developer
- Known for: Founder of Caridon Group
- Title: Founder and chief executive, Caridon Group
- Website: caridongroup.co.uk

Mario Carrozzo is a British businessman and property developer. He is the founder and chief executive of Caridon Group, a housing provider based in Croydon that supplies guaranteed-rent, temporary and supported accommodation to local authorities in London and south-east England. He founded Caridon Property in 2009 and later established the Caridon Foundation, which claims to support vulnerable tenants, and Caridon Young Living, which reportedly provides supported accommodation for looked-after children and care leavers. He has raised money for the British Asian Trust and other charities through sponsored cycle rides. In 2026 Caridon Group was named Employer of the Year (wider sector) at Inside Housing’s Housing Heroes Awards.

== Career ==
=== Caridon Property ===
Caridon Property Limited was incorporated on 21 April 2009, and Carrozzo has been a director since July 2010. The Big Issue reported that the company was set up in Croydon as a family-run business after Carrozzo housed a homeless person in one of his own properties. The business began by offering private landlords guaranteed rents and by housing tenants referred through the social sector. Carrozzo's company biography describes the arrangement as one of London's first rent guarantee schemes. By 2017 the company said it was working with all 32 London boroughs and receiving referrals from housing associations and charities.

=== Caridon Group ===
Carrozzo formed Caridon Group in 2015 to bring the business under a single holding structure. In June that year Caridon Holdings secured a £50 million financing facility from a fund advised by RoundShield Partners to expand its social housing portfolio, beginning with the conversion of a vacant office building in Crawley; at the time the business managed more than 700 homes in Greater London, about 400 of which it owned. In 2017 Carrozzo said that the group's development arm had delivered more than 1,700 homes in the preceding 18 months. The group's operating companies came to include Caridon Developments, the not-for-profit Caridon Foundation, Caridon Young Living, the energy-efficiency business Caridon Eco and, from December 2024, the estate agency Caridon Estates. At the launch of Caridon Estates the group's portfolio was reported at about 2,500 units.

== Social programmes ==
=== Caridon Foundation ===
Carrozzo established the Caridon Foundation in 2017. It was incorporated in April that year as Caridon Housing, a company limited by guarantee, and adopted its present name in January 2018. The foundation provides housing-related support to tenants considered vulnerable, helping them to sustain tenancies, manage money and move towards independent or long-term housing, and works with partner organisations on training in employability, CV writing, budgeting and self-esteem. Its board has included the former Labour MP and health minister Ann Keen, Richard Pacitti, a former chief executive of Mind in Croydon, and the chartered accountant Nash Jaffer, who chairs it.

=== Caridon Young Living ===
Caridon Young Living Ltd was incorporated in July 2019 and provides supported accommodation for looked-after children and care leavers, regulated by Ofsted. After a full inspection in June 2025, Ofsted found "consistently strong service delivery" at a service with capacity for 18 young people across three shared homes, the highest of the three outcomes used in inspections of supported accommodation. The company was a London regional finalist in the 2025 Great British Care Awards.

== Charitable activity ==
=== British Asian Trust ===
In February 2025 Carrozzo rode in the British Asian Trust's Most Exotic Bicycle Tour, a 250-kilometre ride over four days from 4 to 9 February, of which Caridon Group was an official sponsor. The 2025 tour, the seventh in the series, raised more than £450,000 for the trust's work in education, mental health and economic empowerment in South Asia. Carrozzo has said that the route crossed Goa and that he personally raised more than £28,000 for disadvantaged children. The tour, founded in 2016 by the trust's supporters Rohit Chadha and Bobby Ahluwalia, had raised more than £3.5 million for vulnerable children and communities across South Asia by 2026.

=== Other causes ===
In September 2025 he attended the launch at the House of Lords of a partnership between the Safeguarding Alliance and BDO UK in support of Della's Law, a campaign to close the legal gap that allows registered sex offenders to change their names to avoid detection; Caridon Group supports the campaign. Caridon Property became a corporate supporter of The Big Issue in 2019.

== Recognition ==
Caridon Group won the Employer of the Year (wider sector) category at Inside Housing’s Housing Heroes Awards in 2026. The winning entry cited a workforce of 170, a rise in staff retention from 93 per cent to almost 98 per cent over twelve months, and support for more than 10,000 people since 2009. The group was awarded bronze in the Community Champion of the Year category at The Negotiator Awards in 2022 and silver in 2023.
