= Rubayyat Jahan =

Bangladeshi-born British singer (born 1979)

Rubayyat Jahan রুবায়াত জাহান
- Born: 26 February 1979 (age 47); Chittagong, Bangladesh
- Origin: London, England
- Occupation: Singer
- Instruments: Vocals; guitar
- Years active: 2008–present
- Label: Movie Box

Rubayyat Jahan (Bengali: রুবায়াত জাহান; born 26 February 1979) is a Bangladeshi-born British singer.

== Early life ==
Jahan was born in Chittagong, Bangladesh and spent her formative years growing up in Kushtia, Khulna Division, Bangladesh. Her late father, AKM Shamsuddin, a chemistry graduate from University of Dhaka, would take her to the Lalon akra in Kushtia where she watched musical performances. Her mother, Jainab Chaudhury, is a graduate from the University of Chittagong.

== Music career ==
Jahan started singing from the age of eight. She has sung and performed at Asian festivals in the UK and has featured on British Asian television channels and other media. Since, 2008, She has performed regularly in London and other cities. In 2010, Jahan reached the final round of Brit Asia TV's Asian Superstars.

Jahan met Raja Kaasheff at a music festival and, in February 2013, they formed a musical partnership. They have collaborated on songs such as "Meri Pardesi Babu", "Srabone", "Koh Jaon" and "Sathe Robe Tumi". They have performed live music together in UK and abroad.

On 14 March 2013, Jahan's debut single "Meri Pardesi Babu" was released. The song was produced by Rishi Rich. On 17 July 2014 her second single "Donno Ami Dhonno Mago" was released. On 26 March 2015, her third single "Tomake Balobashe – O Amar Desh" was released in commemoration of 44 years of Bangladesh independence. It was composed by Raja Kaasheff and written by Dilu Nasir.

In August 2013, Jahan along with Kaasheff was interviewed by Gagan Grewel on BBC Asian Network. In April 2012 she was interviewed by Shawkat Hashmi on BBC Radio Sheffield. In February 2015, Jahan and Kaasheff were interviewed on BBC World's Impact focusing on International Mother Language Day.

In July 2014, she performed at the Palace of Westminster. In May 2015, she performed at the Boishakhi Mela. In July of the same year, two songs "Tumake Balobashi – O Amar Desh" and "Jaavidan", co-recorded with Raja Kaasheff, were launched at the Houses of Parliament.

In 2015, Jahan and Kaasheff worked on an original soundtrack for Habibul Islam's film Rathrir Jathri. In April 2015, a song released by Conservative Friends of India about Prime Minister David Cameron. It featured Jahan and Navin Kundra, and is written by Pandit Dinesh.

In 2015, she worked with Bangladeshi actor and model Amaan Reza on a music video.

Jahan is signed to Movie Box. She writes and sings songs in Bengali, Hindi, Urdu and English.

== Awards and nominations ==
In September 2013, she was nominated for Best Female Act at the Brit Asia TV Music Awards.

== Discography ==
=== Singles ===
Year	Single	Chart positions	Album
2013	"Mere Pardesi Babu"		
2013	"Kho Jaon" (with Raja Kaasheff)		
2014	"Akhiyon Se Door" (with Raja Kaasheff)		
2014	"Shathe Robe Tumi (Promise Me)" (with Raja Kaasheff)		
2014	"Bangladesh" (with Raja Kaasheff)		
2014	"Srabone" (with Raja Kaasheff)		
2014	"Teri Jawani Hai Masti" (with Raja Kaasheff, featuring Tania)		
2014	"Nazroon (Duet)" (with Raja Kaasheff, featuring Tania)		
2014	"Tanhaiyaan " (with Raja Kaasheff)		
2015	"Raat" (with Raja Kaasheff)		
2015	"Jaavidaan" (with Raja Kaasheff)		
2015	"Ami Shundori Nari" (with Raja Kaasheff)		
2015	"Tomake Bhalobeshe – O Amar Desh" (with Raja Kaasheff)		

== See also ==
- British Bangladeshi
- List of British Bangladeshis
