= Shongram =

- Theatrical release poster
- Directed by: Munsur Ali
- Screenplay by: Munsur Ali; Billy Mackinnon
- Story by: Munsur Ali
- Produced by: Munsur Ali; Amir Ahmed; Charlene Campbell
- Starring: Anupam Kher; Asia Argento; Amaan Reza; Dilruba Yasmeen Ruhee; Arman Parvez Murad; Steve Hope Wynne; Raffaella Coleman; Max Pepper
- Cinematography: Lorenzo Levrini
- Edited by: Richard Gordon-Colebrooke
- Music by: Armeen Musa; Emon Saha; Kevin Melnick
- Production company: Spotlight UK
- Distributed by: Shongram Motion Pictures
- Release dates: 28 March 2014 (Bangladesh); 14 July 2014 (United Kingdom)
- Running time: 118 minutes
- Countries: United Kingdom; Bangladesh
- Language: Bengali

Shongram (Bengali: সংগ্রাম; English: Struggle; classified under the name 71 er Shongram in Bangladesh) is a 2014 British-Bangladeshi romantic historical drama film written, directed and produced by Munsur Ali, stars Anupam Kher, Asia Argento, Amaan Reza and Dilruba Yasmeen Ruhee, and co-stars Arman Parvez Murad and Ananta Hira.

The film depicts an English reporter speaking to an old freedom fighter who reveals his past, account, involvement, loss and struggle during the conflict of 1971 Bangladesh Liberation War.

== Plot ==
Set against the backdrop of the present time UK, the storyline of the film shows the memories of an ailing British-Bangladeshi Muslim man Karim Uddin (Anupam Kher) recalling, recounting and sharing his horrific experiences during the war of independence on his hospital deathbed in an interview with daring British journalist Sarah (Asia Argento) in London.

The story focuses on flashback scenes of the war from the perspective of a young Karim (Amaan Reza) who falls in love with a beautiful young Hindu woman Asha (Dilruba Yasmeen Ruhee). His world is then torn apart when his peaceful village is interrupted by a war and he is separated from his girlfriend so he can do his duty. He is soon forced to join an underground band of freedom fighters after the genocide and abduction of innocent Bangladeshis and his girlfriend.

In a destructive whirlwind of mass murder, abductions, rape, and arson, Karim faces new challenges and decisions, attempts to serve his country, fight for his freedom and seeks revenge against the man who ruined his life before he can finally search for and save Asha.

== Cast ==
- Anupam Kher as Old Karim: A quiet, long suffering, ailing man who finally reveals his past, shares his experience and narrates the story in flashback.
  - Amaan Reza as Young Karim: A young, cheery, childish and energetic village man with no goals in his life except trying to impress Asha. However, the war affects him and his village directly and forces him to mature quickly to survive and take on new challenges and decisions. He goes from an innocent and carefree civilian to a broken soul mired in the conflict.
- Asia Argento as Sarah: A daring London journalist intending to report on undiscovered stories. She bonds with Old Karim who she sympathises with and believes his story needs to be told.
- Dilruba Yasmeen Ruhee as Asha: An attractive, young, jovial, lively, loudmouthed, rural Hindu woman, who is fiery at Karim and hides a softer side from him.
- Arman Parvez Murad as Major Iftikhar: A cool and cruel senior Pakistani officer who is not easily fazed, and is used to war and the benefits he can reap from it.
- Ananta Hira as Altaf: Karim's elder brother and leader of the freedom fighters.
- Steve Hope Wynne as Mike
- Naj Modak as Doctor
- Shubrodho as Suraj
- Raffaella Coleman as Coleman
- Max Pepper as Doctor 2

== Production ==
=== Development and pre-production ===
The film is Munsur Ali's first feature film, who wrote, directed and produced it. It was the first time a British film was simultaneously written, produced and directed by a British Bangladeshi. The film is a fictional romantic drama based around the factual and historical events. In a June 2013 interview, Ali said, "I've actually been learning about this topic [Bangladesh Liberation War] of 1971 from a young age, having heard a lot of stories about the struggles of 1971. I viewed archive footage and read testimonials from both Bangladeshi and Pakistani points of view. I also spoke to eye witnesses, including an Englishman who was in Dhaka on the night everything kicked off, 25th of March 1971. Forty-two years on, it's difficult to formulate a picture of what happened that is 100% correct, and as a filmmaker I understand that. I avoided disputed issues such as how many were killed during the genocide, but I accepted that there was genocide. It was important for me to find my own opinion and give that a narrative structure." The research included talking to people of the liberation army, researchers, victims of the war, people in the Pakistani Army who are in the UK and going material on the war.

Although it is fiction, the film is loosely based around key events and dates, such as Sheikh Mujibur Rahman after the war speech on the 7 March 1971, just before his arrest, the first day of attack on the Bengali civilian population on 25 March 1971, while also explaining the atrocities that took place. The film includes a narrative of political, historical and romantic overtones.

The film starts with rare original archive footage on NBC from 26 March 1971 (when Operation Searchlight started) setting the backdrop to the film. The 60 second footage talks of 200 years of British rule, Partition and the context of the Liberation War is developed from there.

The film is produced in its authentic languages of Bengali and Urdu, while it is also wrapped in English. It starts and finishes in English and the flashback period is in Bengali and Urdu with subtitles.

=== Casting ===
Ali had a team in Bangladesh that arranged the pre-selection cast for him to choose from. The film is aimed at an international audience, so Ali selected actors from Hollywood and Bollywood for the international exposure. When he approached Anupam Kher and Asia Argento, they agreed to act in the film for its "beautiful story".

Ali had personal contact with the actors and crews. A few British actors, as well as British and American technical crews worked on the film. The film also stars Amaan Reza, Dilruba Yasmeen Ruhee, Arman Parvej Murad and Ananta Hira.

In an August 2013 interview with Sakaal Times, Kher said, he accepted the role because "As a 16-year-old living in Shimla, I know about 1971 and what happened at that time." In March 2014, Ruhee said to Dhaka Tribune, "When I decided to start career in film I didn't get any suitable character and then Munsur Ali came to me with the script and I felt this is the best option to start my film career. I am grateful that I got to act in this film." In July, she said to The Daily Ittefaq, "It's a landmark of an achievement to have a Bangladeshi based story accepted at a mainstream festival [London Indian Film Festival], I am very excited and happy as this is my first film and I'm very hopeful for our industry."

=== Filming and post-production ===
Promotional poster

Ali brought all the equipment of film making from the UK in order to make the film of international standard. Shooting began for the film on 18 December 2011 with a pre-launch event at Rich Mix in London. Production started in the region rural and semi-rural parts of Sylhet Division, Bangladesh. 80 per cent of shooting took place in Bangladesh, during the six weeks of shooting in Bangladesh there were regular power cuts while filming so breaks were taken, which meant losing time and money. After completing the first shoot phase in Bangladesh a rough cut of the film was already complete with the dubbing stage in motion. Director of photography Lorenzo Levrini said, "It was truly a memorable, exciting and challenging time to shoot in a mostly remote rural terrain, within a tight deadline and budget, but high expectations!"

The final parts of the film were shot in London and India. After the majority of the film shooting and post-production was already complete, the UK phase was shot in London in summer 2013.

"On the surface it's a love story between a Muslim boy and a Hindu girl, how the war changes their lives and how Karim is forced to become a freedom fighter before he can search for the love of his life. It's a different kind of love story set during a different kind of war. It's an entertaining dramatic portrayal of an era that was largely missed by the world."

— Munsur Ali, writer, director and producer of Shongram

Ali worked on the project for three years. The film is the most expensive war film ever made in Bangladesh, with a budget of £400,000.

In March 2014, Ali said to New Age, "I wanted to change the situation by making a film which is of international standard and has a moving story about our country and people so that I can satisfy both local and international audiences." He added to The News Today: "On the surface it's a love story between a Muslim boy and a Hindu girl, how the war changes their lives and how Karim is forced to become a freedom fighter before he can search for the love of his life. It's a different kind of love story set during a different kind of war. It's an entertaining dramatic portrayal of an era that was largely missed by the world." In November 2015, Ali told The Hindu, "For me, the film was about finding my own roots and satisfying the craving for my own identity. I grew up in East London, which was a very racist place in the 1980s. When I was 18-19 years old, I seriously questioned my own identity... For me it is important that I know my roots now, I know where I come from. For me, it is self exploration."

== Soundtrack ==
Ali wrote a scene based on the song "Ey Shondhay", which Armeen Musa co-wrote with Saif Q and featured on her debut album Aye Ghum Bhangai. Ali contacted Musa via Twitter for permission to use the song for the film in September 2011. Coincidentally, Musa was intending to visit London the following month, and after meeting in person, Ali offered her the job of soundtrack composer in December 2011.

The film's soundtrack album contains seven songs which are sung by Dr. Nashid Kamal, Kona, Armeen Musa, Kevin Melnick, Nolok Babu, Razu and Zanita Ahmed. The soundtrack was composed by Armeen and the background music score was composed by Emon Saha.

A seven-track album was released by Laser Vision in Bangladesh on 18 March 2014. A full nine-track edition of the album was made available for digital download internationally after June 2014.

== Promotion and release ==
The initial distribution marketing trailer for Shongram was first screened at Rich Mix Cinema in London as part of Brick Lane Circle's third annual conference on the "Story of Bangladesh and Bangladeshi People, At Home and in the Diaspora" on 27 April 2013. Anupam Kher, Munsur Ali and Dilruba Yasmeen Ruhee attended a press conference at Grange City Hotel in London on 9 August 2013. Trailers of the film were shown at the University of Manchester, where Ruhee took part in a seminar while visiting the UK to campaign for the film.

The film had its first private screening at the Rich Mix Cinema on 10 February 2014. The film premiered at Blockbuster Cinema screen in Jamuna Future Park in Dhaka on 27 March 2014 (the day after Bangladesh Independence Day), with theatrical release on 28 March in 50 cinemas in Bangladesh (including Star Cinplex in Bashundhara City), before heading for Cannes, then a UK release and world premier at The O2 Arena in London on 14 July, a special screening at London's Leicester Square on 16 July at the London Indian Film Festival, and followed by Europe and international release in Malaysia and Singapore.

The film was screened at the Darpan Singapore Film Festival in November 2014, the Keswick Film Festival in February 2015, the Indian Film Festival of Los Angeles in April 2015, the Tribeca Film Festival in April 2015 and the NETPAC category of the Kolkata International Film Festival in November 2015.

The title of the film in Bangladesh is 71 er Shongram. The film is subtitled: The Struggle for Love and Survival – Bangladesh 1971 and A romantic drama set during the untold era of genocide, rape and war in Bangladesh 1971.

== Reception ==
The Independent (in Bangladesh) said, "It's an entertaining dramatic portrayal of a modern tragic era that was largely missed by the world... Shongram is a historic film; it is gritty, raw, romantic and nostalgic, while having an international appeal through the production techniques and a subject matter which is still very relevant today." Mandy called the film "A moving tale focusing on a village that experienced firsthand, the tyranny that the Bengali people felt in 1971, how the experience converts civilians and farmers to fighters."

WhatsOn rated the film 3/5. Zia Nazmul Islam of The Daily Star rated the film 2/5 and thought "The final message that Munsur Ali wanted convey to the international audience was successfully delivered through the last scene – which is that the genocide of 1971 is probably one of the most ignored events in recent times." Miftaul Islam and Amran of Cutting East Film Festival said, "Yasmeen Ruhee who plays Asha was the standout in this movie, delivering an emotional ride of a full of life yet vulnerable Hindu living in Bangladesh..." Daniel Nelson of One World thought "The film has plenty of drama and lashings of violence, but the starkness with which its goodies and baddies are painted means it cannot rise beyond adventure yarn status." FilmDoo said, "...Shongram is an ugly movie with problems right at it's [sic] core, regardless of it's [sic] budget and origin...." Shiv Sahay Singh of The Hindu said, "Shongram, drew wide praise at the 21st Kolkata International Film Festival."

Film director Morshedul Islam said, "Everyone involved in the film is the generation after the war, yet they have performed excellently, that itself is a big deal."

== Awards and nominations ==
Year	Award	Category	Result
2014	London Indian Film Festival	Official Selection	Nominated
2014	Singapore International Film Festival	Official Selection	Nominated
2015	Kolkata International Film Festival	Official Selection	Nominated

== See also ==
- 7th March Speech of Sheikh Mujibur Rahman
- 1971 Bangladesh Genocide
- 1971 Dhaka University massacre
- Artistic depictions of Bangladesh Liberation War
- Bangladesh Liberation War
- British Bangladeshi
