= Navin Kundra =

British singer-songwriter (born 1985)

- Born: Navin Kundra; 11 January 1985 (age 41); Coventry, England
- Occupations: Singer, songwriter, composer, producer, musician
- Instruments: Guitar, piano, harmonium, drums
- Years active: 2004–present
- Website: navinkundra.com

Navin Kundra is a British singer-songwriter, who writes, composes and performs songs in Hindi, Punjabi and English.

Navin has achieved six number one singles in the Asian Charts, and won the 2013 'Entertainer of the Year' Award in the Houses of Parliament. In 2011, he became an ambassador for the British Asian Trust, and used his music to break a Guinness World Record raising £10,000 for the Trust. In 2012, Navin was appointed ambassador of the diabetes charity, Silver Star. Since becoming one of their ambassadors, Navin has helped the charity raise in excess of £10,000 by performing at fundraising events across the UK. Navin has delivered talks at youth conferences across the UK. In October 2013, Navin became the first British Asian singer to be invited to St James's Palace to perform for TRH Charles, Prince of Wales and Camilla, Duchess of Cornwall along with other guests. In November 2015, Navin was a headline performer at Wembley Stadium in London, for the visit of the PM of India, Shri Narendra Modi

== Early life ==
Kundra grew up on Wyken Grange Road in Coventry. He attended Caludon Castle School.

== Career ==
His first break came on his 19th birthday when he represented the UK in a World Series of Zee TV's Sa Re Ga Ma Pa filmed in Dubai. This gave him the opportunity to showcase his talent to figures in the Indian music industry, as well as presenting his singing to a worldwide television audience.

He performed live at Birmingham Symphony Hall.

Navin has released eleven music videos – 'Bandagi', 'Tear It Up', 'Dangerous', 'Jind', 'Pa Na Na', 'Zinda Hoon' (I am Alive) with dancers from the Eastern Illusion Dance Troupe, the following were co-written and produced by Mushtaq – 'Love Thing', 'Mehbooba', 'Jee Le', 'Shudaayi' and 'Hamesha'.

Navin has also collaborated with Rishi Rich and Jay Sean on a track called "Fade Away" which he has chosen to use it as a tribute to Michael Jackson.

He became an ambassador for the British Asian Trust on 7 July 2011.

In 2012, Navin was appointed ambassador of diabetes charity, Silver Star.

Navin was awarded as an ambassador for Sewa Day at the House of Commons of the United Kingdom, Palace of Westminster, London, 26 March 2014.

== Performances ==
Performed with percussionist and producer Pandit Dinesh, and virtuoso piano player Kishon Khan.

Food For Life Charity Event – London – 10 October 2009

Star Act at British Asian Sports Awards - London, 2010

Performance at a Silver Star event – 22 February 2010

Worked with Canadian director Jazz Virk and artist Prita Chhabra on Virk's project Dance on 28 May 2011.

Star Act and Guest Judge on the Asian dance show, 'Boogie Woogie', New York, 2011

Guinness World Records for largest Bollywood Dance at Manchester Mega Mela at Platt Fields Park in Fallowfield (1,406 people breaking the previous record of 1,336 people in Bandra, Mumbai, India) to his song Mehbooba on 23 July 2011.

In Concert with Raghav at Nawaab in Manchester, on 16 March 2012

Headline Act & Co-Presenter at Miss India UK Worldwide Beauty Pageant, London, 2012

In Concert with Atif Aslam, Bollywood playback singer at LockDown 2012 Bridgewater Hall, Manchester – 27 April 2012

An Exclusive Evening with Shahrukh Khan at the CSN International Exhibition & Conference Centre In Birmingham 26 January 2013

Headline Act for 'Save Wild Tigers' Gala Event - London, 21 March 2013

Asian Express' 100 Years of Bollywood With Jackie Shroff in Bradford, 3 May 2013

Reception for Silver Star (charity) initiative for diabetes 6th anniversary – 12 September 2013

Performed for TRH Charles, Prince of Wales and Camilla, Duchess of Cornwall – St James's Palace – 24 October 2013

Performance in The House of Commons of the United Kingdom, Palace of Westminster, London – 20 March 2014

Acoustic version of Amazing Grace in the River Room within the House of Lords, in support of the Lily Foundation; a charity which works to combat human trafficking and child abuse in India – 15 July 2014.

Navin was a headline performer at Wembley Stadium on 13 November 2015, on the occasion of Community Reception for Prime Minister of India Narendra Modi.

Navin performed for a second time for the Prime Minister of India Narendra Modi in Brussels to address the European Union (EU) on 30 March 2016.

== Projects ==
Navin wrote the lyrics for Avina Shah's debut song "Tere Bina", released in October 2010. It is a charity song to raise awareness of domestic violence and is supported by the Southall Black Sisters. The song was inspired by the real-life story of Kiranjit Ahluwalia, played by Aishwarya Rai in the film Provoked.

Navin reworks his song 'Mehbooba', adding English lyrics, and performing it as a duet with Rekha Sawhney for a Bollywood proposal on BBC One Doctors (2000 TV series)

Navin in Bollywood

Filmmaker Sajid Nadiadwala chose Navin to be the playback singer for Bollywood actor Akshay Kumar in Kambakth Ishq (Damned Love), released on 29 May 2009.

Navin in Hollywood

Navin's sixth No. 1 Punjabi Track Shudaayi features in director Raghav Murali's film – The Spectacular Jihad of Taz Rahim, released on 29 May 2015

== Discography ==
- 'Tukde, Tukde' (Pieces), which released on 19 September 2006, was Navin's debut song, sung in Punjabi. He co-wrote with M. Johal.
- 'Main Ha Tere Naal' (I am with You) released in July 2007 was his second release, sung in Punjabi.
- 'Zinda Hoon' (I am Alive) released 17 December 2007
- 'Khalli Dil' (Empty Heart) written and composed by Navin.
- 'Love Thing' hits BBC Asian Network Charts at No. 16 – 23 February 2009.
- 'Tere Liye' (For You) a love song (co-written with Mushtaq, composed and sung by Navin) was released 14 February 2009.
- 'Fade Away' (A Hindi and English track) released in June 2009 as a tribute to Michael Jackson.
- 'Mehbooba' released – 26 July 2009.
- 'Jee Le' released – 29 July 2010
- 'Aaja' released on iTunes – 14 February 2011.
- 'Nach Le' released on iTunes – 30 September 2011
- 'Shudaayi' released on iTunes – 20 August 2012.
- 'Hamesha' (Forever) released on 14 February 2013. It is the cover of the Heatwave R&B song Always and Forever.
- 'Pa Na Na' released on iTunes – 7 November 2013.
- 'Paint the Town' released on iTunes – 11 June 2014 as part of The Heights EP by Naamless a.k.a. Sahil Sabh.
- 'Dangerous' released on iTunes – 4 December 2014.
- 'Jind' (feat. Alison Gabrielle) released on iTunes – 12 February 2015
- 'Tear It Up' released on iTunes 12 August 2016.
- 'Bandagi' was released on iTunes – 27 January 2017.
- 'No Games' was released on iTunes 8 May 2017.
- 'Burning Slow' released on iTunes 9 February 2018.
- 'Ishq Humara' released on iTunes 11 May 2018.
- 'Khush Rahi' released on iTunes 6 January 2021.

== Albums ==
The Collection released on 19 September 2015. This eighteen track album includes Navin's six No. 1 hit tracks and three Hindi mix covers.
