= Mumtaheena Toya =

Bangladeshi model, dancer and television actress

Mumtaheena Chowdhury Toya
- মুমতাহিনা চৌধুরি টয়া
- Toya in 2026
- Born: Mumtaheena Chowdhury Toya; 24 April 1991 (age 35); Rangamati, Bangladesh
- Education: Holy Cross College
- Alma mater: Eastern University
- Occupations: Model; Actress
- Years active: 2010–present
- Notable work: Bengali Beauty
- Spouse: Sayed Zaman Shawon (m. 2020)

Mumtaheena Chowdhury Toya (born 24 April 1991) is a Bangladeshi model, dancer and television actress, who has worked in various Bengali language television dramas and serials. She has acted in many commercials as well as short films. In 2010, she was ranked fifth on the Lux Channel I Superstar.

== Early life ==
Toya was born on 24 April 1991 in Rangamati to a Muslim family. Her father is a businessman by profession and her mother is a school teacher.

== Personal life ==
Toya fell in love with Kathbirali actor Sayed Zaman Shawon while attending an acting training workshop in India in late 2019. She married Shawon on 29 February 2020.

== Career ==
Toya competed as a contestant on Lux Channel I Superstar in 2010, where she finished 5th and began her career as a model. Her acting career began with the Odekha Megher Kabya drama directed by Rumana Rashid Ishita. She later worked in many television shows, dramas, telefilms and commercials. She has also done many video songs. Toya is a brand representative of "La Reve".

== Filmography ==
Key
†	Denotes productions that have not yet been released

Year	Title	Role	Director	Notes	Ref(s)
2018	Bengali Beauty	Moyna Iftekhar	Rahsaan Noor	Debut in film	

=== Television ===
- Nine and a Half
- Shongjog Bichinno
- Odekha Megher Kabya
- Laboni (2021) (Telefilm)

== Awards and honors ==
- 5th place in Lux Channel I Superstar (2010)
