= Kings of Devon =

- Movie poster
- Directed by: Rahsaan Noor
- Produced by: Rahsaan Noor
- Starring: Rahsaan Noor; Bakhtiar Hafeez; Tamim Chowdhury; Trishna Murad
- Distributed by: Sadhana Pictures
- Release date: 17 September 2010
- Running time: 107 minutes
- Country: USA
- Language: Bengali

Kings of Devon is a 2010 Bengali language dark comedy film written, produced, and directed by Rahsaan Noor. Noor also stars in the film, which was made for charity. It was released in the United States on 17 September 2010.

== Plot ==
In 1982, Bengali people ruled the streets of Chicago. Arif Choudhury comes to Chicago at the request of his uncle but gets caught in the middle of a bitter rivalry between the two biggest gangs in the Devon area of the city, Apon Desh and BD-Chicago. Accused of murder and on the run from the authorities, Arif befriends Johnny – who pledges to help Arif and get revenge on Sikander Saab. Did Arif commit murder or is he being framed? Will they get revenge on Sikander Saab? Who will climb the mountain and become the king of Devon...?

== Cast ==
- Rahsaan Noor as Johnny
- Bakhtiar Hafeez as Sikandar Saab
- Tamim Chowdhury as Arif Chowdhury
- Trishna Murad as Tasfia

== Release ==
Kings of Devon was released throughout the United States in association with BIG Cinemas. The film also featured music from The Times Group and Saregama. The film ran successfully in various cities throughout the United States. Islam was interviewed on Channel i through the lead-up to the release of the film.

=== Charitable cause ===
The box office revenues from Kings of Devon went to raise money for Shishu Bikash Kendra, a school for underprivileged children in the Dhanmondi district of Dhaka, Bangladesh. Home media DVDs were also made available to raise money for the charity. Shishu Bikash Kendra is a part of Zonta International.

== Soundtrack ==
The soundtrack of Kings of Devon was licensed from Times Music and Saregama.

No.	Title	Singers	Length
1.	"Mon Hariye Jai"	Bhoomi	03:44
2.	"Chalo Chalein"	Bappi Lahiri, Runa Laila	03:55
3.	"Disco 82"	Lata Mangeshkar, Kishore Kumar	03:46
4.	"Leelabali"	Lopamudra Mitra	04:27
5.	"Pag Ghungroo"	Kishore Kumar	11:37
6.	"Asha Chilo"	Kishore Kumar	04:13
