= Zero Degree (film) =

- Theatrical release poster
- Directed by: Animesh Aich
- Written by: Animesh Aich
- Produced by: Mahfuz Ahmed
- Starring: Mahfuz Ahmed; Joya Ahsan; Dilruba Yasmeen Ruhee; Iresh Zaker; Tariq Anam Khan; Iftekhar Zaib; Mir Rabbi; Tele Samad
- Cinematography: Nehal Qureshi
- Music by: Faruq Mahfuz Anam James
- Production company: PlayHouse
- Distributed by: PlayHouse Production
- Release date: 6 February 2015
- Running time: 146 minutes
- Country: Bangladesh
- Languages: Bangla; English

Zero Degree is a 2015 Bangladeshi psychological thriller film written and directed by Animesh Aich, starring Mahfuz Ahmed, Joya Ahsan, and Dilruba Yasmeen Ruhee in lead roles. The film focuses on a love triangle that later turns fatal and revengeful. The film's first look was launched on 5 November 2014 and a trailer was released on 15 January 2015. The film is produced by Mahfuz Ahmed under the banner Playhouse Production. The film was released on 6 February 2015.

== Plot ==
Iresh Zaker, Head of the Police Department tries to hunt them down after several murders caused by them and in the same time, not knowing what happened after she left, Nira decides to come back to Amit and her son. After escaping the Police, Amit and Saniya take a hideout in an abandoned factory. Upon learning that Nira came back for him, Amit calls her to the factory intending to kill her. After she arrives, police surround the whole factory, leaving them no choice but to surrender or stay inside. Amit, Saniya and Nira end up face to face with no option to escape. The story takes an unexpected twist at the end.

== Cast ==
- Mahfuz Ahmed as Amit
- Joya Ahsan as Saniya
- Dilruba Yasmeen Ruhee as Nira
- Iresh Zaker as Police Officer
- Tariq Anam Khan
- Iftekhar Zaib
- Mir Rabbi
- Tele Samad as Saniya's dance teacher
- Laila Hasan

== Production ==
Filming was conducted in Bangladesh and Singapore, from 2013 to 25 April 2014. The film went to post-production in May and the film received its release certificate on 23 November 2014.

== Critical response ==
Towheed Feroze wrote in the Dhaka Courier, "Bangladeshi movie makers need to concentrate more on a tightly knit plot and minimize goof-ups." He criticized the film's mounting implausibilities and its loss of momentum two-thirds of the way through, but praised the photography. Abdullah Al Amin (Rubel) of The Daily Star gave the film two-and-a-half stars out of five. Although he praised the cinematography as "wonderful", the soundtrack for enhancing the movie, and the originality of the story, the story-telling was disappointing. He wrote, "Expectations were high with Animesh Aich at the helm, but unfortunately expectations weren't met with this film".
