= Nina Nannar =

British journalist

Nina Nannar is a British journalist, who has worked for ITN News for more than 20 years.

Born and brought up in Scunthorpe, North Lincolnshire to Punjabi parents, along with her two brothers and sister, she worked on BBC Midlands Today, Children in Need (1999–2000) and the BBC News's 2000 Today.

She joined ITN in March 2001 as the media and arts correspondent for ITV News, later becoming a news correspondent. On 13 December 2016, it was announced that Nannar was to become arts editor from 2017.

She has interviewed celebrities and covered major arts events, including the Oscars and BAFTAs. Nannar is a member of BAFTA and the Brit Awards Voting Academy.

Nannar is an ambassador for the King's Trust and the British Asian Trust. In 2025, she was awarded a fellowship at the Royal Society of Arts.
