= Tele Samad =

Bangladeshi actor (1945–2019)

- টেলি সামাদ
- Born: 8 January 1945; Munshiganj District, Bengal Presidency, British India
- Died: 6 April 2019 (aged 74); Dhaka, Bangladesh
- Occupation: Actor

Tele Samad (8 January 1945 – 6 April 2019) was a Bangladeshi actor. He acted in over 600 films.

== Education ==
Samad studied at the Faculty of Fine Arts, University of Dhaka.

== Career ==
Samad made his debut in 1973 film Kar Bou, directed by Nazrul Islam. He got his breakthrough in the film Noyonmoni, directed by Amjad Hossain. He also performed as a playback singer in more than 50 films. He served as the music director of the film Mona Pagla.

== Later life and death ==
Samad suffered from different medical complications including kidney and heart problems and infections in his leg and had undergone a leg operation. He died on 6 April 2019 at the age of 74.

== Filmography ==
- 1973 Kar Bou
- 1974 Shesh Theke Shuru
- 1975 Sujon Sokhi Boga
- 1975 Ovagi
- 1975 Chashir Meye - Mohabbat Khan
- 1975 Badshah
- 1976 Bondini
- 1976 Nayanmoni - Golap Ali
- 1976 Gunda- Jabbar
- 1977 Moti Mahal - Hadi
- 1977 Jadur Bashi - Peyar Ali
- 1978 Toofan
- 1978 Oshikkhito - Kala
- 1978 Nagardola
- 1978 Bodhu Biday - Ashiq
- 1978 Golapi Ekhon Traine - Bonga
- 1979 The Father
- 1979 Rajkumari Chandraban
- 1979 Matir Ghar
- 1979 Bijoyini Sonavan
- 1979 Din Jai Kotha Thakey
- 1980 Ekhoni Somoy
- 1980 Chandralekha
- 1980 Shesh Uttar - Keramot
- 1980 Alif Laila
- 1981 Badhon Hara
- 1981 Kalmilata - Bioscopewala
- 1982 Lal Kajal
- 1982 Boro Barir Meye
- 1983 Notun Bou
- 1983 Laili Majnu
- 1984 Sokhinar Juddho
- 1984 Noyoner Alo - Biju
- 1984 Mayer Achol
- 1984 The Hunger Sadhu
- 1985 Miss Lolita
- 1990 Chhutir Phande - Brojendramohan Ghosh
- 1991 Streer Paona Kader
- 1991 Swashur Bari
- 1992 Bondhu Amar
- 1993 Ondho Prem Micheal - Cherag Ali
- 1993 Keyamot Theke Keyamot - Matchmaker Ghuri
- 2008 Akkel Alir Nirbachon
- 2009 Ke Ami - Hashem
- 2010 Mayer Chokh
- 2010 Mughal-E-Azam
- 2012 Raja - Surja Kha
- 2015 Zero Degree
