= Dilruba Yasmeen Ruhee =

Bangladeshi model and actress

- দিলরুবা ইয়াসমীন রূহী
- Born: 25 May 1988 (age 37); Dhaka, Bangladesh
- Occupations: Model, Actor
- Years active: 2006–present
- Spouse: Munsur Ali (m. 2014)
- Modeling information
- Height: 5 ft 5 in (1.65 m)
- Hair color: Black
- Eye color: Brown

Dilruba Yasmeen Ruhee (born 25 May 1988) is a Bangladeshi model and actress.

== Early life ==
Ruhee was born in Dhaka, Bangladesh. She studied science at Agrani School and College but later changed her studies to economics. In the meantime, she took short courses in fashion design. While in class six or seven, she designed clothes for her neighbours, and since the age of 16, she has designed her own clothes. In 2009, she graduated with a degree in economics from North South University.

== Modelling career ==
Ruhee started her career as a model. Photographer Farque Helal and fashion designer Emdad Haq first recognised Ruhee's potential in 2006 and ushered her into modelling for the ramp, print media, and TV commercials. In March 2006, she started modelling, Banglar Mela was her first work. In 2007, she was first noticed when she was selected as a model for her first television advertisement, for Parachute hair oil, made by Amitabh Reza. She was also cast in Grameenphone Xplore's advertisement, made by Abed Maullick. She also worked on an advertisement for Diamond World jewelry, made by Sohel Arman, and Elite Paint. Within two years, Ruhee had worked for many renowned companies.

Ruhee has worked as a model for fashion houses such as Bangler Mela, Mayasir, Kay Kraft, Dressidel, Mantra, and Arong. She has also worked as a model in West Bengal. Since January 2014, she has worked as a brand ambassador for Joconde.

== Acting career ==
In 2007, Ruhee started acting in television dramas. Her debut television drama (Bangla natok) was Oporichita, based on Rabindranath Tagore's short story and directed by Ahmed Shushmoy. She then shifted her focus to Dhallywood films (Bangladeshi Bangla Cinema) and worked in films. She acted in Shahidujamman Selim's Britter Bhitore Eka, Ahmed Shushmoy's Shopnomukh, Ripon Nabi's Ochena Manush, Giashuddin Selim's Obogunthon (written by Monju Sarkar about a female entrepreneur) and Love. She was the lead role as Gulbahar, a woman with two children (a role for which she had to gain 12 kg). Another television production was Shondha by Gisauddin Selim, where she played an NGO worker. She also worked with director Abu Sayeed in a drama titled Jonmo Amar, which was inspired by the Bangladesh Liberation War and patriotism. She has also worked in Giasuddin Selim's television drama Obogunthoon, which garnered her popularity.

The first film Ruhee signed for was a Kolkata-based film. For various reasons, the work has been delayed. With Parambrata Chatterjee, she worked on two other Tollywood films called Sporsho and Glamour. In Mohua Chakrabarty's Glamour, Ruhee enacted the role of a fashion model co-starring Prambrata, and it was her first break in the Indian film industry.

Her first film to be released was Munsur Ali's Shongram, a period film based on the war of independence and set in the wartime of '71 in East Pakistan, where she enacted the role of a Hindu woman who is a rape victim. The film was about how ruthless people can become and how women fall prey in any conflict. Another one of her films is Mayanagar, directed by Shanti Chowdhury and co-starring model Nipun, about the tension between a woman's relationship and her career. Her character is an international supermodel who owns a modelling agency where she grooms upcoming models. Vogue was involved in the project. Her third film is the psychological thriller Zero Degree, which was made by Animesh Aich, and co-stars Mahfuz Ahmed and Joya Ahsan. She plays the mother of a son who dies in an accident, and her husband loses stability and blames her and sets out to take revenge on her. She worked with British-Bangladeshi director Aminul Islam Bappi in a film called Three Illegal, which is about people who go abroad for a better life through illegal means. Her character is an expat from the UK who helps illegal immigrants find ways to become legal. In February 2015, Glamour and Zero Degree were both released.

In June 2014, Ruhee was interviewed by Nadia Ali on BBC Asian Network. In September 2015, she will host the London Bengali Film Festival (LBFF).

== Personal life ==
In December 2011, while working on the film Shongram, Ruhee met and became close friends with British film director Munsur Ali. On 3 September 2014, Ruhee married Ali in Dhaka, Bangladesh. This was followed by a gaye holud ceremony on 4 September and a wedding reception on 5 September. Ruhee divides her time between Dhaka and London.
