= Kal Parekh =

American actor

- Born: Gujarat, India 1985
- Education: School of Visual Arts
- Occupation: Actor
- Years active: 2002–present
- Website: kalparekh.com

Kal Parekh (Gujarati: કલ પારેખ) is an Indian-American film and television actor best known for his starring role as detective Nick Patel in The Spectacular Jihad of Taz Rahim and as Sanjeev, an Indian-American flight engineer in the ABC television series, Pan Am, set in the 1960s.

== Early life ==
Parekh was born in India, and spent his early years in Jaipur. In the late 1980s, his parents moved the family to the United States, settling in Verona, New Jersey. Parekh graduated from Verona High School. He next studied at and graduated from the School of Visual Arts (SVA) in New York City. While at SVA, Parekh produced an animated short that was screened at various film festivals. During his time at SVA, he learned to dance by watching music videos.

He said,

Dancing liberated me, I was no longer an introverted individual, which I had been my whole life. Dancing came very naturally to me. I never took classes. It's something I just picked up and ended up being good at.

In 2002 he was cast in the first ever South Asian production on Broadway titled "Rang: Shades of my soul." He went on to teach for four years at Arya Dance Academy. Parekh has said that dancing and animation helped him to imagine acting.

== Career ==
After graduating from SVA, Parekh took classes in live-action film at the New York Film Academy (NYFA) and later studied at Juilliard and T. Shreiber Studios. Soon after, he landed his first major role, as Shaheed in the Bollywood Hindi-language film, Khel Shuru. He learned Hindi for the part.

Parekh next appeared in the film Kehtaa Hai Dil Baar Baar. and Siddharth Anand's NYC based feature film Ta Ra Rum Pum as the character Nilesh.

In 2010, Parekh had a lead role in the independent film Karma Road, as the character Ronick. Directed by Mihir Pathak, the film won the Silver Award for Best Feature Film at the 2010 Philadelphia Film Festival and the Gold Level Award for a feature film at the 2010 California Film Awards.

In early 2011, he was cast as Sanjeev in the ABC prime-time period drama Pan Am. He and the show were quite popular, especially in Europe, and won a Rose d'Or in 2012.

In 2013, he co-starred as Aaron on the FOX drama, The Following.

In 2014 he starred as Prakash Dutta alongside Pooja Batra in the Indie action film The Spirit of Mumbai directed by John Tillotson.

In 2015 he played detective Nick Patel in the feature film The Spectacular Jihad of Taz Raheem, which was based on true events.

Parekh later co-starred in Orange is the New Black, Quantico alongside Priyanka Chopra Jonas and FBI: Most Wanted.

Parekh will next star in the musical romance film Coco & Nut alongside Pranutan Bhal and Rahsaan Noor.

== Personal life ==
Parekh resides in New York City, and previously lived in Los Angeles. He is in a relationship.

== Filmography ==
=== Film ===
Year	Title	Role	Notes	Ref(s)
2006	Khel Shuru	Shaheed		
2011	New Year's Eve	Male Obstetrician		
2014	The Spirit of Mumbai	Prakash Dutta		
2015	The Spectacular Jihad of Taz Rahim	Nick Patel		
2025	Coco & Nut †	TBA		

=== Television ===
Year	Title	Role	Notes	Ref(s)
2007	House	Passenger	Uncredited Role; Episode: "Airborne"	
2007	Entourage	Miller Gold Agent	Uncredited Role; Episode: "Gary's Desk"	
2012	Gossip Girl	Chuck's Doctor	Episode: "The End of the Affair?"	
2012	Blue Bloods	Dr. Pruit	Episode: "Parenthood"	
2011-2012	Pan Am	Sanjeev	Recurring Role	
2013	The Following	Aaron	Recurring Role	
2013	Law & Order: Special Victims Unit	Doctor	Episode: "American Tragedy"	
2014	Black Box	OR Nurse	Episode: "Who Are You?" "Kodachrome" "Free Will"	
2016	Orange Is The New Black	CO Thorpe	Episode: "Work That Body for Me"	
2018	Quantico	Fahad Harith	Episode: "The Blood of Romeo"	
2022	FBI: Most Wanted	Boris Paulsen	Episode: "Incendiary"	
