= Silver Star (charity) =

British-based diabetes charity

Silver Star is a charity based in the United Kingdom. It specialises in raising awareness of diabetes.

In raising awareness the charity has contacted numerous celebrities including Bollywood actresses Shilpa Shetty and Kareena Kapoor.

== Controversy ==
Charity money was linked to hiring prostitutes for local politician Keith Vaz.
