= Raja Kaasheff =

Raja Kaasheff (Raja Kashif)
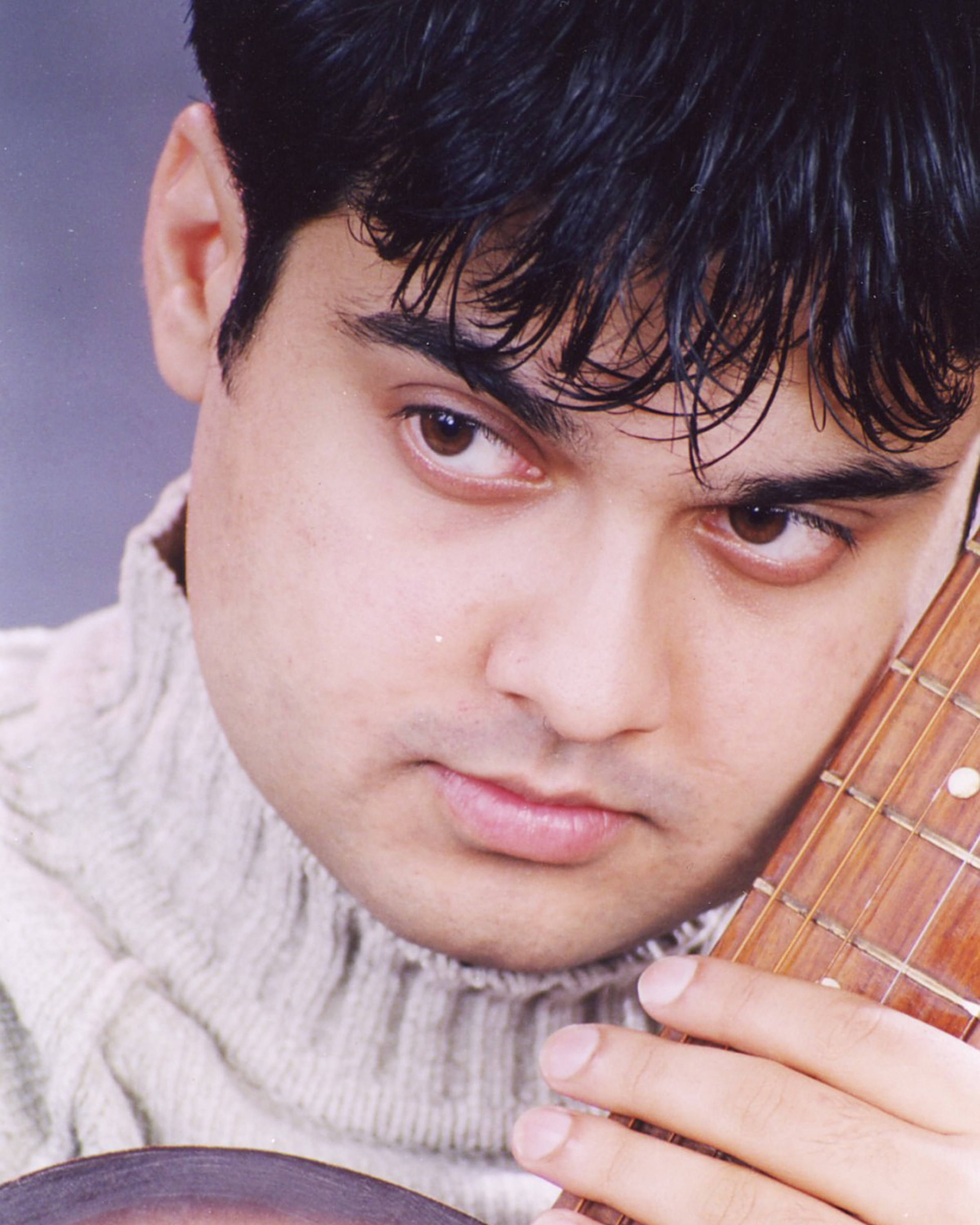

Background information
- Born: 26 August 1978 (age 47)
- Genres: Indian, Bollywood music, Bangla Music
- Occupation: Singer / music director / arranger
- Website: http://rajakashif.com

Raja Kaasheff or Raja Kashif (born 26 August 1978) is a United Kingdom-based Asian singer/music director equally known in India and Bangladesh Urdu/Hindi & Bangla-speaking diaspora around the world. He learned music under the guidance of music director Ravi and the Sham-Churasi, Gharana (meaning family). Ravi's films include Do Badan, Chaudhavin Ka Chand, Hamraaz, Gumrah, and Nikah.

== Early career ==
Born in Isleworth, Kaasheff started in the industry presenting a kids' programme raising money for Imran Khan's Shaukat Khanum Memorial Cancer Hospital & Research Centre in the UK. He also performed live in the charity events that were organised.

== Current works ==
While learning under the guidance of Music Director Ravi Raja Kaasheff was introduced to Indian film singer Alka Yagnik. He has now announced the completion of a duet album with Alka Yagnik. The duet, produced by Indian company Moviebox His Master's Voice, is Yagnik's first non-film work.

He has recently entered the Bollywood music industry. Dev Anand has given him a breakthrough as a music director and singer in his latest film Chargesheet Senior lyricist Gopaldas Neeraj has written the song and Shankar Mahadevan has sung the song with Kaasheff.

Raja has released an album on Kamlee Records named My Dearest Maa which is a tribute to mothers. This song is also a tribute to 4 Living Legends Dilip Kumar, Dev Anand, Dharmendra & Pran, from Pakistan Nadeem & Moin Akhtar. The song also features these highly respected legends of Bollywood. The album was released in March 2009 in the UK and worldwide in May 2009.

Kaasheff has had three albums released in the UK so far: Pyar kar lay, Yaar tera sharmana, and Haseen Raatein, in which, he has collaborated with a very famous singer of Bollywood Alka Yagnik. This album was a big success in India, Pakistan and also the UK. He has recently composed and sung for the Dev Anand's current film Charge-Sheet which is on location presently.

For the first time in film history these artists have come together to make a rare appearance in the video of the title song "Maa". Saira Bano (Mrs. Dilip Kumar) has supporting him. Kaasheff has gained a lot of publicity, recognition and admiration for these projects both in India, Pakistan and the UK. He has worked very closely with Indian artists and has been a great ambassador for promoting and maintaining Indo- Pak relations.

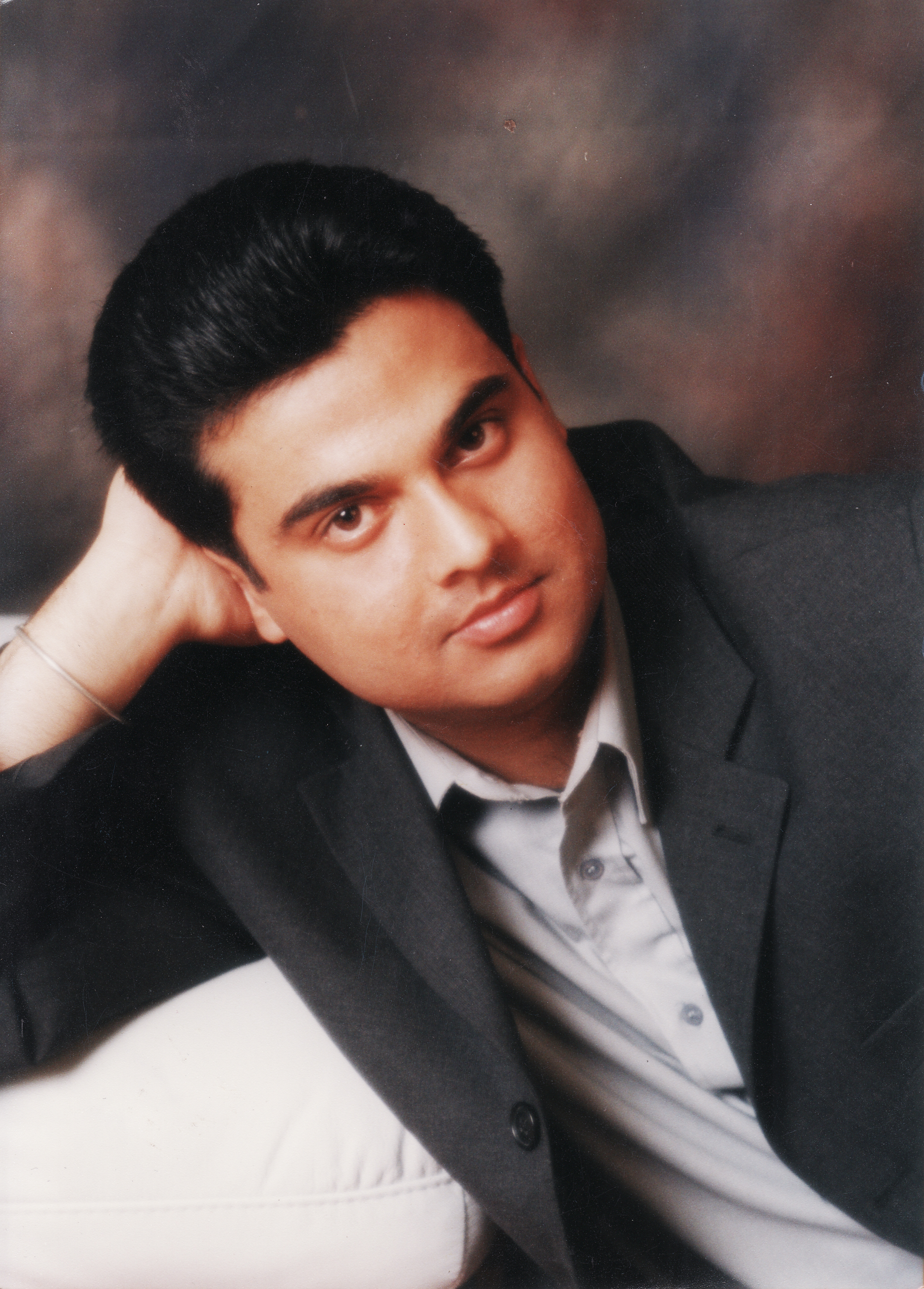
Raja Kaasheff 2001

Kaasheff has collaborated with a Bollywood singer Adnan Sami. He has producing songs for the Bollywood film industry. The song performed as a duet by Kaasheff and Adnan Sami. This song is due to feature in Kaasheff's forthcoming release. Also Raja has worked with Suzana Ansar, Anuradha Paudwal, music director Pyarelal, Uttam Singh, Preeti Uttam, Anwar, Suresh Wadekar, Mohd. Aziz and UK based Bengali singer Rubayyat Jahan.

In 2012, Kaasheff joined forces with British singer Suzana Ansar to record a duet album titled Mehvashaa (Urdu: محوشاہ) is a studio album by English singers Raja Kaasheff and Suzana Ansar, released on 14 February 2013 by Movie Box UK in the Hindi/Urdu, Bengali and Persian languages. The album contains 12 songs and comes with 10 glossy music videos shot in the UK, Italy, New York and Sweden. Released by MovieBox records on Valentine's Day 2013. The album contains 12 songs^{[1]} and features tracks in Hindi, Urdu, Bengali and Persian.^{[4]} 10 music videos were shot for the album in the UK, Italy, New York and Sweden.^{[1]} The album's press release was held at the House of Commons on 6 February 2013.

In 2015, Rubayyat Jahan and Kaasheff worked on an original soundtrack for Habibul Islam's film Rathrir Jathri.

In 2015, Kaasheff & Jahan both worked with Bangladeshi actor and model Amaan Reza on a music video Asho Na Tumi Ar Which is Composed and arranged by both of them and lyrics by Rubayyat Jahan.

Raja Kaasheff is signed to Movie Box. He writes and sings songs in Bengali, Hindi, Urdu and English.

== Albums ==
Album	Label	Year
Pyar Kar Lay	Saregama RPG	2001
Yaar Tera Sharmana	Saregama RPG	2003
Haseen Raatein with Alka Yagnik	Kamlee Records	2006
My Dearest Maa	Kamlee Records / Geo Music	2009
Mehvashaa	Moviebox – Kamlee Records	2013
