= Mita Rahman =

Actress (died 2023)

- Born: 22 January 1958
- Died: 29 June 2023 (aged 65); Hertfordshire, England

Mita Rahman (also Mita Chowdhury; 22 January 1958 – 29 June 2023) was a Bangladeshi-British actress.

In the 1970s, Rahman became a notable actress in post-independence Bangladesh, with several television and stage performances. She was known for her role as 'Rabeya' in a 1978 Bangladesh Television adaptation of Nondito Norokey, a novel by Humayun Ahmed. She was also a presenter on the World Music radio programme on Bangladesh Betar.

At the height of her career, Rahman got married and moved to Guernsey in the Channel Islands, where she spent the next few decades, raising a family and working in a number of careers. In 2006, she returned to acting. Among others, she performed in a Tara Theatre production of Sonata by Mahesh Elkunchwar, which also played in Dhaka afterwards. She became a more regular presence in Bangladeshi television dramas. On British television, she had supporting roles in series such as This is Going to Hurt, We Are Lady Parts and The Good Karma Hospital.

Rahman died near her home in Hitchin, Hertfordshire after suffering from pancreatic cancer on 29 June 2023, at the age of 65. She had two children.
