= British Asian Trust =

British charity addressing poverty and hardship in South Asia

The British Asian Trust
- Industry: Charity Sector
- Founded: 2007
- Headquarters: United Kingdom
- Key people: Charles III (president)
- Revenue: 5,834,030 pound sterling (2020)
- Number of employees: 45 (2024)
- Website: BritishAsianTrust.org

The British Asian Trust was founded in 2007 by King Charles III (then Prince of Wales) and a group of pre-eminent British Asian business leaders. The Trust works to tackle the widespread poverty and hardship in South Asia to which millions are currently subjected.

Since its establishment in 2007, the Trust has positively impacted the lives of 6.6 million disadvantaged people in India, Pakistan, Bangladesh and Sri Lanka.

== Focus ==
The Trust's programmes are categorized into several key areas: livelihoods, education, mental health, conservation and anti-human trafficking. The Trust works with local delivery partners in India, Pakistan, Bangladesh and Sri Lanka.

== Innovative finance ==
The recent evolution in philanthropy to incorporate business principles has led to ground-breaking developments in the voluntary sector. Social-impact financing, a relatively new charity finance model, offers funders an investment return if the programme to which they are committed is successful. This outcome-based finance mechanism requires clear targets and focuses on gathering data to demonstrate the results. Such meticulousness is attracting donors to invest, bringing new capital into the sector and playing a critical role in bridging the financing gap to achieve the UN's Sustainable Development Goals. This approach appeals to other lenders, such as charities, governments and entrepreneurs, as it substantiates the positive impact that their donations have made.

The British Asian Trust is leading an innovative model of social-impact financing, in the form of Development Impact Bonds (DIB), allowing the Trust to set up initiatives to improve the quality education in India. The DIB mechanism involves public-private relationships between ‘risk’ investors, programme implementers and outcome funders. In the case of the aforementioned Quality Education India Development Impact Bond, UBS Optimus Foundation are the ‘risk’ investors who have raised US$3 million to offer upfront working capital to the consortium, thus enabling the administration of the programme for the duration of its four-year lifetime. The programme implementers, Gyan Shala, Kaivalya Education Foundation and Society for All Round Developments, then use this capital to fund the delivery of the programme. Granted that the outcomes of the programme are achieved, the outcome funders, who are convened by the Trust, make a payment and the initial ‘risk’ investors may earn a 6% interest on the capital lent.

Advocates of this form of innovative finance include Sir Ronald Cohen who maintained that "these bonds are an innovative and… a tremendously effective way of raising the funds needed to address some of the greatest challenges in the region at the kind of scale necessary to make a significant difference."

== Ambassadors and trustees ==
Ambassadors from the worlds of television, film, music, sport and cuisine support the Trust, including: Katy Perry, Mahira Khan, Asad Ahmad, Gurinder Chadha, Ikram Butt, Isa Guha, Azhar Mahmood, James Caan, Konnie Huq, Kumar Sangakkara, Laila Rouass, Manish Bhasin, Manish Malhotra, Meera Syal, Monica Yunus, Muttiah Muralitharan, Naughty Boy, Navin Kundra, Neev Spencer, Nina Nannar, Nina Wadia, Nitin Ganatra, Noreen Khan, Preeya Kalidas, Rahul Dravid, Ray Panthaka, Rahat Fateh Ali Khan, Reshmin Chowdhury, Ritula Shah, Sanjeev Bhaskar, Sonali Shah, Sophie Choudry, Zayn Malik, and Sriram Vishwanathan.

On the Board of Trustees, headed by Chairman Lord Gadhia, are Shalni Arora, Farzana Baduel, Varun Chandra, Ganesh Ramani, Asif Rangoonwala and Dr Shenila Rawal.
