= Simanaheen =

- Theatrical Release Poster
- Directed by: Kevin Dalvi; Ria Mahtab
- Starring: Rahsaan Noor; Ismat
- Music by: Rusho Mahtab
- Production company: NEQUA Studios
- Distributed by: NEQUA Studios; Priya Entertainments
- Release dates: 14 February 2013 (India); 1 March 2013 (Bangladesh)
- Languages: Bengali; English

Simanaheen (সীমানাহীন; English: Limitless) is a 2013 Bengali romance film directed by Kevin Dalvi and Ria Mahtab. The film marks the debuts of Rahsaan Noor and Ismat. Simanaheen released in theatres worldwide on Valentine's Day 2013 and in Bangladesh on 1 March 2013.

== Plot ==
During the time of violent religious riots in partition time Bengal, Suraiya (Ismat) secretly receives classical dance lessons from Amar's sister, while Amar (Rahsaan Noor) spies on the sessions. Stealing glances at one another, Amar and Suraiya fall in love despite Amar being a Hindu and Suraiya being a Muslim.

Running side-by-side, but in a different time, Kavita (Ismat) is a medical student living obediently with her parents in modern-day Chicago. One night, while at a party, Kavita meets Raiyan (Rahsaan Noor) and they slowly fall in love despite Kavita's fears that her parents will not accept her relationship with a Muslim Boy.

Kavita tries to slowly introduce Raiyan, under a false Hindu name, to her family during her cousin's wedding. After the festivities, Raiyan and Kavita finally confront their religious differences and agree that they accept each other for who they are. However, Kavita's parents soon find out Raiyan's true identity and force her to break up with him. Parallel to this, Amar tries to stop Suraiya's wedding but is ridiculed and beaten up by her family.

Kavita tries to move forward with a new life by agreeing to marry Joy Bose. She is, however, constantly distracted by thoughts of Raiyan when she is with Joy. Raiyan is similarly torn apart and goes as far as praying at a Hindu temple in order to test his belief that two faiths can live together.

After hearing news of the death of Raiyan's father, Kavita secretly attends his funeral where she runs into Raiyan. After a brief encounter, the two part again with the understanding that Kavita will marry Joy Bose. In the past storyline, touched by the fact that Amar was willing to become a Muslim for her, Suraiya runs away with him. The two run away to a Kolkata church but are tracked down by Suraiya's family. In the resulting fight, Amar is killed by Suraiya's brother.

In the present, Raiyan decides to return a family heirloom that Kavita had gifted him. He meets Suraiya's family at their home only to discover that they have canceled Kavita's wedding. In flashback, the discussion at Kavita's wedding reveals that Kavita's maternal grandmother was a Muslim whom converted to Hinduism after her family killed her Hindu boyfriend. Kavita's grandmother was Suraiya.

After hearing the story, Raiyan rushes to the mandir to meet Kavita and they have a heart-touching reunion.

== Cast ==
- Rahsaan Noor as Amar/Raiyan
- Ismat as Suraiya/Kavita
- Nafees Ahmed as Arun Mukherjee
- Dilara M. Ahmed as Soumitra Mukherjee
- Trishna Murad as Nazia
- Apshara Islam as Priya Mukherjee
- Tanim Hossain as Joy Bose
- Anita Hossain as Seema
- Sabbir Ahsanullah as Arnob
- Rezai Islam as Salman
- Bakhtiar Hafeez as Mohammad Khaled
- Selina Ahmed as Farzana Khaled
- Munir Islam as Syed Saleem Jamaluddin
- Apurba Islam as Guam
- Narmeen Samad as Shefali
- Ridwan Islam as Ziauddin
- Mobin Rahman as Prosenjit Bose
- Praerona Murad as Sayeeda

== Production ==
In 2011, Rahsaan Noor brought the story to the attention of director Kevin Dalvi and NEQUA Studios. The studio decided to take up the project and put together a team to finish the scripting of the film. The production of the film took place completely in Chicago, USA; beginning in 2011 and ending in 2012.

For the film's cast, NEQUA Studios didn't want any "established stars or people that are easily recognizable" as they were looking "to build a new brand of film for the international Bengali audience" and felt that familiar faces wouldn't have had the "intended effect on the audience". As such, the film is unique in that it features a cast of second-generation Bengali-Americans and diaspora Bengalis from around the United States and is completely composed of newcomers. Noor was the first one to be cast and was followed by Ismat, as the producers felt her personality closely resembled that of the characters to be portrayed.

Since the film was entirely shot in Chicago, the film crew attempted to get the locations, costume design and language as similar as possible to that of 1947 Bengal as was required for a number scenes. Victorian era architectures and sets were used to create the colonial Victorian feel of the old-style architectures in Bengal. The filmmakers also believed such a style and vision was appropriate in "creating a dreamy, nostalgic, and larger than life rendition of partition time Bengal that the modern characters of the film would imagine and dream of."

== Soundtrack ==
The music of the film was released on 3 January 2013 at Dhaka's Thirty3 Music Cafe to rave reviews.

Simanaheen

Studio album by Rusho Mahtab
- Released: 3 January 2013
- Genre: Feature film soundtrack
- Length: 35:52
- Label: NEQUA Studios

Rusho Mahtab chronology
Durey Kothai (2010)	Simanaheen (2013)

Song	Singer(s)	Duration	Notes
"Mukti"	Tushar Ahmed & Shudeepta Rahman	02:43	Picturised on Rahsaan Noor & Ismat
"Simanaheen"	Runa Laila & Tushar Ahmed	04:50	Picturised on Rahsaan Noor & Ismat
"Aakash Jemon"	Tushar Ahmed & Shudeepta Rahman	05:03	Picturised on Rahsaan Noor & Ismat
"Kachhey Pabo Tomay"	Rusho Mahtab	05:16	Picturised on Rahsaan Noor & Ismat
"Balukona"	Tushar Ahmed & Shudeepta Rahman	04:33	Picturised on Rahsaan Noor & Ismat
"Jai Ki Phera"	Tushar Ahmed	05:07	Picturised on Rahsaan Noor, Ismat, Trishna Murad, Mouzam Makkar, & Rezai Islam
"Together, Forever"	Instrumental	03:39	Picturised on Rahsaan Noor & Ismat
"Aakash Jemon Reprise"	Tushar Ahmed & Shudeepta Rahman	03:09	Picturised on Rahsaan Noor & Ismat
"Chironton Saathi"	Rahsaan Noor	01:32	Picturised on Rahsaan Noor & Ismat; Poem By: Kumar Islam

=== Reception ===
The Daily Star Lifestyle Magazine rated the album 9/10, saying that "On the whole, the soundtrack accomplishes what the film itself sets out to do. We hope the film can reach the same standards. The Simanaheen Soundtrack is a very impressive film debut for Rusho Mahtab, Tushar Ahmed, and Shudeepta Rahman and Runa Laila impresses as always. Many years down the road, we will be listening back to this soundtrack as an eternal classic."

== Reception ==
=== Critical reception ===
Simanaheen received positive reviews from critics and fans alike. The Dhally/Tolly Report gave the film 4.4/5 stars, stating, "Simanaheen is a beautiful, timeless love story. Watch it for the music, the dialogues, the message, and last but not least, the acting. The direction by Kevin Dalvi and Ria Mahtab is superb, Rusho Mahtab's music is tops, and Rahsaan (Noor) is someone to watch out for." A fan poll conducted by Bengali distributors and multiplexes gave Simanaheen a rating of 4.7/5 - the highest of any film playing in Bengal in 2013.

=== Box office ===
Despite the fact that the film released during the 2013 Shahbag Protest, the "Simanaheen" had a strong opening, with an occupancy of 70–80% in theaters over its opening weekend. Word of mouth has helped the film pick up business throughout the course of its first week and Bengali Kolkata Radio declared it a worldwide 'hit' after its first week in theaters.

Simanaheen holds the record of highest first weekend and first week collections for a Bengali non starcast film. Tehreen Islam of New Age reported that, "Simanaheen has attracted the audience at large numbers...adding to the positive changes that the Bengali film scenario is going through.".
