= Munsur Ali =

British film producer, screenwriter, director and social entrepreneur (born 1978)

- মুনসুর আলী
- Born: 25 May 1978 (age 48); Sylhet, Bangladesh
- Education: London Metropolitan University, BA
- Occupations: Film producer, screenwriter, director, social entrepreneur
- Years active: 2002–present
- Political party: Independent (since 2022)
- Other political affiliations: Labour (until 2022)
- Spouse: Dilruba Yasmeen Ruhee (m. 2014)
- Website: www.munsur.co.uk

Munsur Ali (Bengali: মুনসুর আলী; born 25 May 1978) is a Bangladeshi-born British film producer, screenwriter, director and social entrepreneur, Labour Party politician, and councillor for Portsoken ward. He is best known for his film Shongram, the first time a British film has been simultaneously written, produced and directed by a British Bangladeshi.

== Early life ==
Ali was born in Bangladesh, arrived in England at the age of two in 1980 and grew up in Aldgate where he still lives. He attended a Church of England school, studied Arabic/Islam on weekends and Bangla after school, and also taught himself to speak in Urdu.

From an early age, Ali was influenced by films and in his late teens he took an interest in looking at alternative points of view in mainstream cinema. Going to the cinema a lot as a teenager gave him his inspiration.

Ali attended Sir John Cass Redcoat School and says he "didn't do too well at GCSE." He learned film and photography at Epping Forest College. However, he "was confused and couldn't commit to A-level," so he left in the second year. In 2004, he graduated with a 2:1 in BA Film and Broadcast Productions from London Metropolitan University.

Ali's father was born in British India (now Bangladesh). Ali's father has been in the UK since early 1950s. He gave up his Bangladeshi citizenship and became a British citizen. The majority of Ali's relatives live in the UK.

== Filmmaking career ==
After graduating, Ali made documentaries and short films on social issues such as policing, knife crime and gang violence.

In 2003, he set up an independent video and film production company Spotlight UK before formalising it as a company in 2005. Since then he has worked alongside global US, UK and Bollywood names. In September 2006, he founded Limelight Film Awards, an initiative to identify and celebrate emerging film talent. With the first event taking place in 2007, it is one of the largest independent short film awards ceremony. In 2009, he founded Epic Media Wedding Productions and set about specialising in producing cinematic quality wedding videos.

In 2014, Ali wrote, directed and produced his debut feature film Shongram. The film is a romantic drama set during the 1971 Bangladesh Liberation War. He worked on the project for three years and it was the first time a British film was simultaneously written, produced and directed by a British Bangladeshi.

In February, March and June 2014, he was interviewed by Nadia Ali on BBC Asian Network.

Ali is working on two new films: Cinema which is about a young actor who enters the world of cinema and discovers a whole world of exploitation, corruption, drugs, thugs and betrayal, and The Final Message which is a supernatural horror based around Hebrew scriptures, Christian scriptures and the Quran.

Cllr Munsur Ali

City of London Councillor for Portsoken
- Incumbent
- Assumed office 23 May 2017

Personal details
- Party: Independent (since 2022)
- Other political affiliations: Labour (until 2022)

== Political career ==
On 23 March 2017, Ali was elected as a Labour Party councillor for Portsoken ward in Aldgate in his home town of the City of London, where Labour won five seats. Ali's decision to contest came after he was unhappy with the recent multimillion-pound housing development plans that is affecting his community's future.

In June 2017, he was inaugurated at the Guildhall in London as a member of the Court of Common Council that governs the City of London.

== Awards ==
In 2012, Ali was presented with a Civic Award by Tower Hamlets, in recognition for his contribution of promoting young artists through the Limelight Film Awards.

== Personal life ==
Ali is a Muslim. He lives in Aldgate, London. In December 2011, while working on the film Shongram, Ali met and became close friends with Bangladeshi actress Dilruba Yasmeen Ruhee. On 3 September 2014, Ali married Ruhee in Dhaka, Bangladesh, this was followed by a gaye holud ceremony on 4 September and a wedding reception on 5 September.

== Filmography ==
Year	Title	Credit	Notes
2014	Shongram	Writer, director, producer	
2014	Spirit2Power	Editor	

== See also ==
- British Bangladeshi
- List of British Bangladeshis
