= Motijheel Government Boys' High School =

High school in Motijheel, Dhaka, Bangladesh

Coordinates: 23.7389°N 90.4204°E

Motijheel Government Boys' High School And College
- মতিঝিল সরকারি বালক উচ্চ বিদ্যালয় এন্ড কলেজ
- Outer Circular Road, Motijheel, Dhaka; 1000; Bangladesh

Information
- Type: Government
- Established: 1957
- Principal: Tahmina Yasmin
- Staff: About 70
- Grades: 1 to 12
- Enrollment: About 3,500
- Campus type: Urban
- Color: White
- Education Board: Dhaka
- Website: www.mgbhs.edu.bd

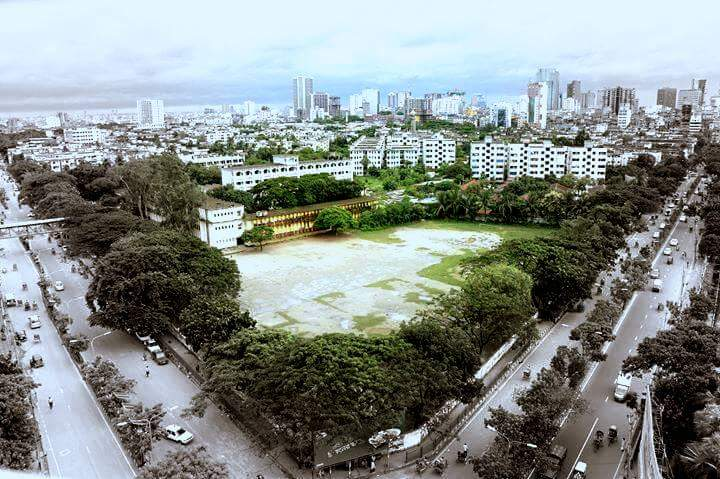
A bird's-eye view of the school. The outer circular road is in grayscale

Motijheel Government Boys' High School And College (Bengali: মতিঝিল সরকারি বালক উচ্চ বিদ্যালয় এন্ড কলেজ) is located at Outer Circular Road, Motijheel, Dhaka, Bangladesh. It was established in 1957 as 'Motijheel Central Government High School'. The students of the school liked to call this school 'Centralian'. The school campus is 7.5 acres with 2 big playgrounds. It was founded by Mr. Sayed Anwar Ahmed. He was the first headmaster of this school.

Classes are held in two shifts: morning shift, from 7:15 am to 11:30 am and day shift, from 12:30 pm to 5:00pm (5:30 for 9-10). There are two faculties for secondary education: Science and Commerce. The school does not have any Arts faculty. There is a science club for science enthusiasts students of the school.

In 2008, the Government of Bangladesh declared it as the provider of Higher Secondary Education. Classes of college are held from 8 am to 2 pm in a six-story building.

The school is regarded as one of the best schools in the locality. It frequently takes place in top ten schools in Dhaka Education Board by result of SSC examination.

In 2016, a short film named 'ইস্কুল' was made featuring the school.

== History ==
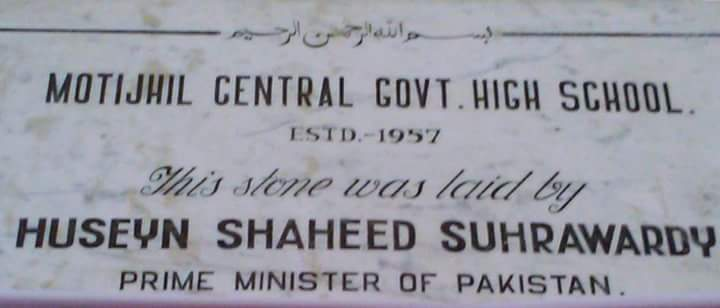
Foundation Stone

On 14 June 1957, the school was founded by Huseyn Shaheed Suhrawardy, the then prime minister of Pakistan. The name of the school was 'Motijheel Central Government High School' then. Later, it was changed to the current name. But even today, the name Central Government remains popular.

Starting with only a few students, the school is now an institution of more than 3500 students.

In 1995, the school was awarded as the Best Educational Institution of Bangladesh, by the Education Ministry of People's Republic of Bangladesh Government. And the Headmaster of that time was Mr. Rashid Uddin Zahid whom awarded as the Best Teacher.

In 2008, the Government of Bangladesh declared it as the Higher Secondary Education provider. A new 6 storied building was built to hold college classes.

== Uniform ==
• White shirt with school monogram

• White pants with black belt

• White shoes

° Navy blue sweater in winter

== Co-curricular activities ==
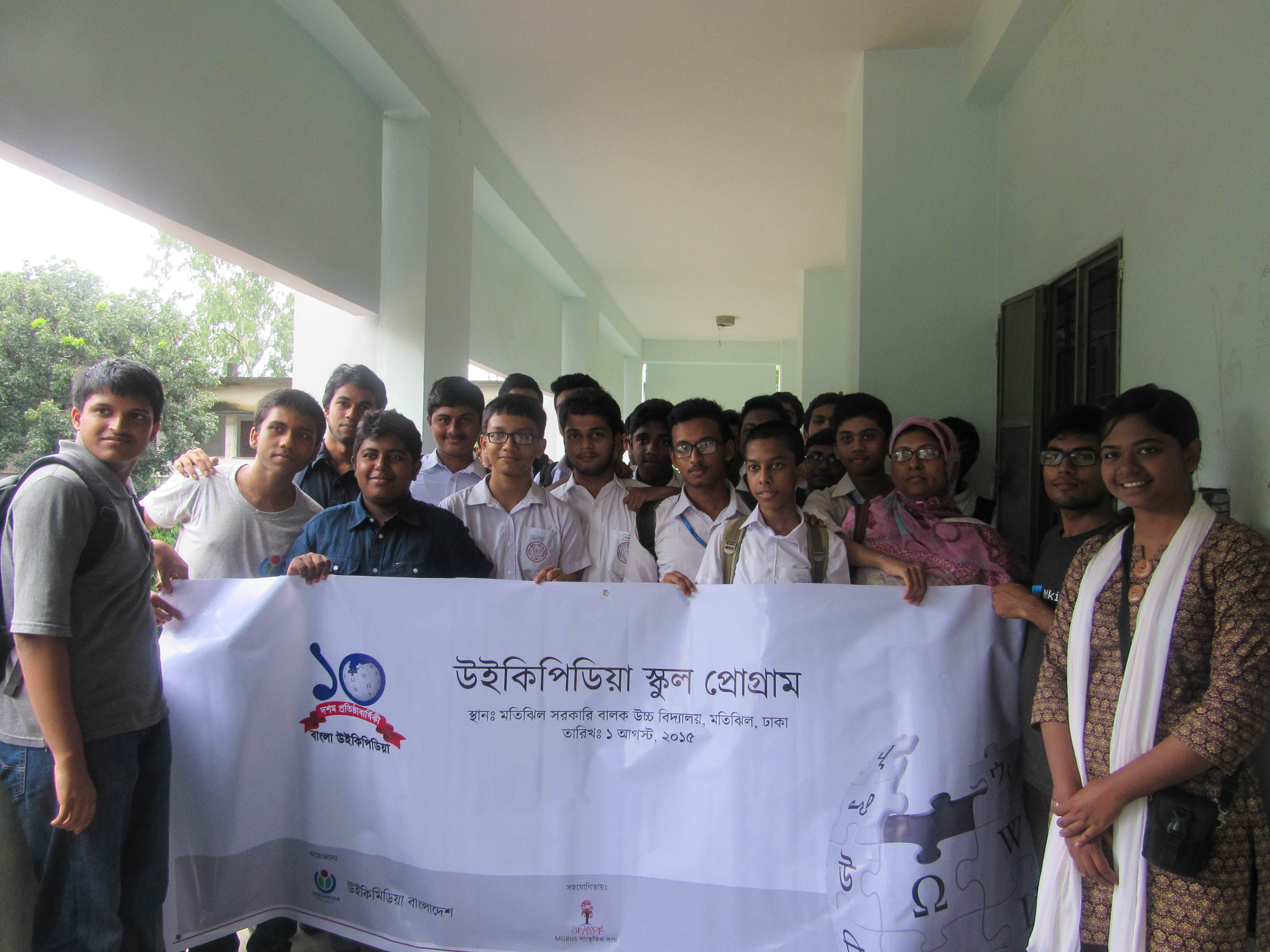
Bangla Wikipedia School Program at the school

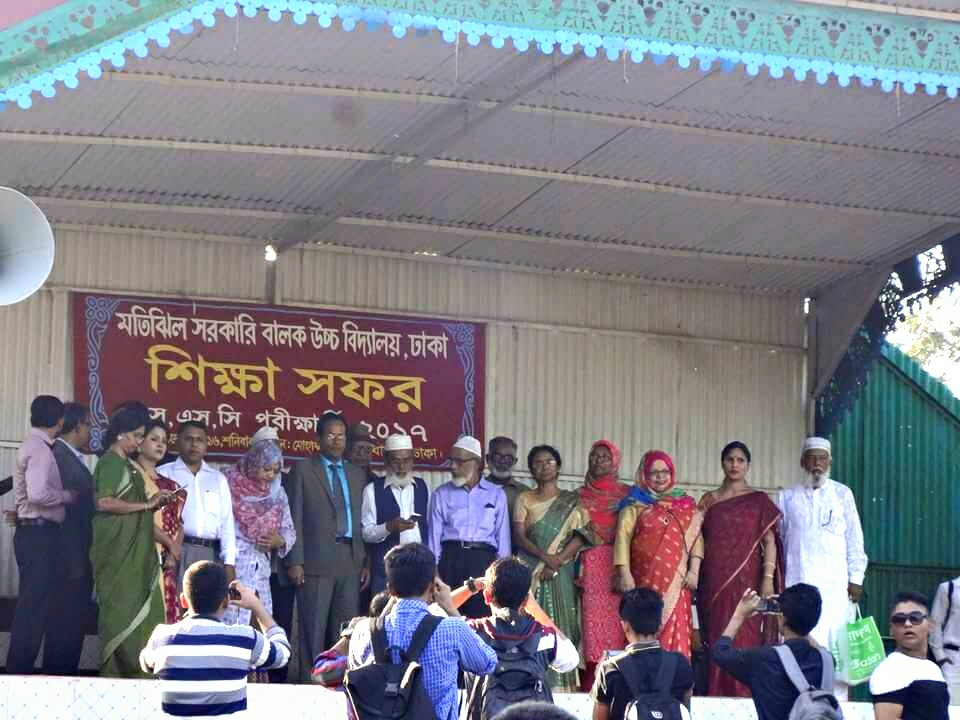
Study Tour of the Institute in 2016

=== MGBHS Green Enthusiastic' Club ===
MGBHS Green Enthusiastic' Club is an active environmental and astronomical club founded in 2016 by a group of students from class X. Dedicated to the motto "Say Green," the club works to nurture young minds and promote environmental awareness among students. The club primarily consists of students from classes IX and X, with guidance from teachers across various disciplines to ensure impactful activities.

=== MGBS Science club (MGBSSC) ===
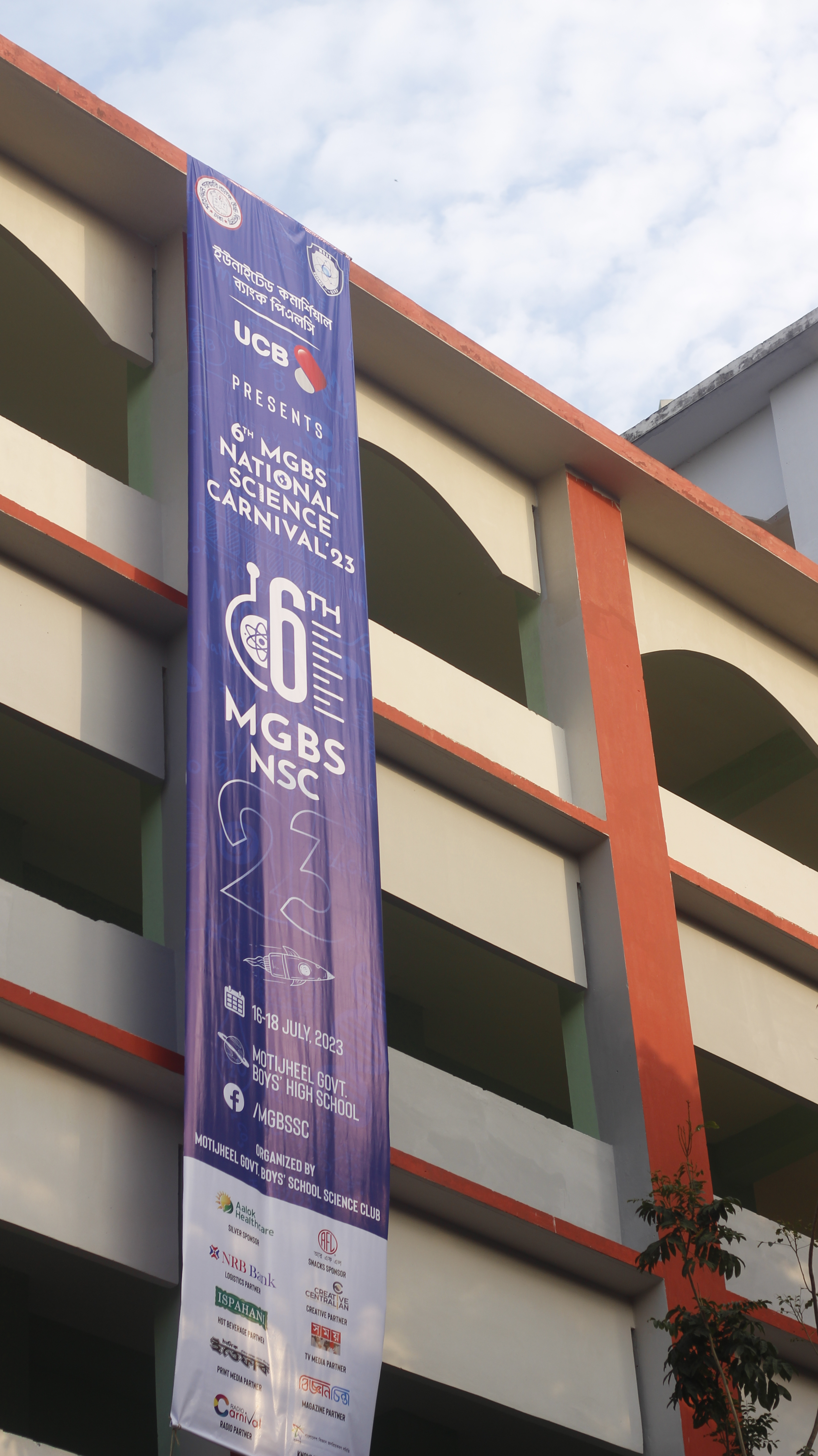
Sunshine on MGBS National Science Carnival Day

The Science Club of Motijheel Government Boys' High School holds a position of high esteem within Dhaka's academic community. Its inception dates back to 2002; however, due to the far-reaching effects of the COVID-19 pandemic, the club's operations were temporarily suspended. In 2022, a dedicated cohort of tenth-grade students took the initiative to reinstate the club's activities. Notably, in 2023, the 22nd edition of the MGBS Intra Science Festival was successfully orchestrated. Spanning from the 16th to the 18th of July 2023, the event marked the resurgence of the MGBS Science Club through its annual flagship event, the 6th MGBS National Science Carnival 2023.

=== Central FC ===
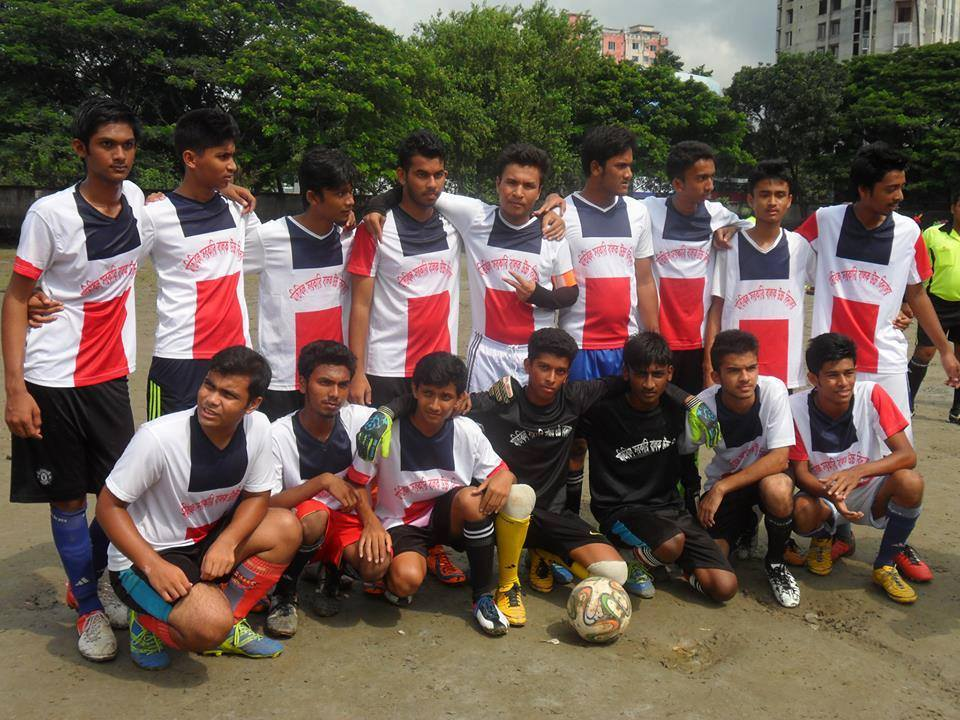
Central FC 2016

Motijheel Government Boys' High school has an excellent football club known as Central FC. Central FC has been the champion of inter-school football tournament for many times. The school often holds inter-school football tournament, too.

=== Debating Club (MGBHSDC) ===
Motijheel Government Boys' High School Debating Club (MGBHSDC) was founded in 1996. Every year they organize inter-school and inter-class debate competitions. In 2009, they started a children's debate. In 2010, they organized a Club debate (university and college) competition. On that time, MGBHSDC was the only school which organized a club debate in Bangladesh. In 2010, they organized the twelfth Inter-school, fourth Children, third Club debate competition and workshop, and 80 teams participated.

Motijheel Government Boys' High school also has an English language club.

=== BNCC ===
Motijheel Government Boys' High school also has a unit and regularly take part on BNCC.

=== Scouts ===
Motijheel Government Boys' High school is a part of Bangladesh Scouts. The school was awarded as first position in singing at the 1974 Jamboree in Mouchak Gazipur. The troop leader was Zia (1977 batch). The song was written, composed and performed by Hanif Mohammad (1978 batch). Later, the song became popular in scouting. The song was performed live in the presence of Bongobondhu Sheikh Mujibur Rahman on his birthday on 17 March 1975 in Banga Bhaban. The performers were Hanif Mohammad, Abu Osman and Imtiaz Kabir. It was played as a documentary in cinema halls before the movies.

In 1989, two students: Munshi Anisul Islam, and Md. Ariful Islam received President's Scout award. In 2016, Sarowar Jahan Sady received the President's Scout Award National Evaluation Camp (C.N.484). At the present, the Unit leaders of MGBHSSG are A.K.M. Jahangir Hossain Mojumder, and the Senior Patron Leaders are Eyafee Al Hossain, Syed Inan Fattah, and Md.Abdulla Al Noman.

=== Red Crescent ===
The school Red Crescent Unit helps people who are affected by floods and other natural calamities. They organize Basic First Aid workshops for the students of schools and colleges.

=== MGBHS Cultural Club ===
The school has a cultural club named সংশপ্তক (Shongshoptok). সংশপ্তক made a short film named 'ইস্কুল' (Ischool) in 2016 featuring the school. The short film recalls the memory of an ex-student of the school. The Cultural Club of Motijheel Government Boys' High School arranges ceremonial gatherings to commemorate significant events and notable occurrences. Additionally, it orchestrates the institution's eminent cultural affair, known as the MGBHS Annual Cultural Program. Remarkably, the club's constituents have garnered repeated recognition in prestigious nationwide competitions, including the National Education Week and the "Jatiyo Shishu Protijogita" (National Children's Competition). Currently, Suvasish Halder is serving as the President of the Administration of MGBS Cultural Club.

=== Motijheel Government Boys' Handball Team ===
The Motijheel Government Boys' Handball Team represents Motijheel Government Boys' High School in handball competitions. The team participates annually in national-level handball competitions across different age categories, including under-10, under-12, under-15, and under-16 divisions. Through its participation, the team provides students with opportunities to develop their athletic abilities, teamwork, discipline, and sportsmanship. Its involvement in these competitions also contributes to the school's sporting activities and encourages students to pursue physical fitness and competitive sports.

Notable players associated with the Motijheel Government Boys' High School Handball Team include Md Faysal, who was selected to represent the Bangladesh national beach handball team at the 6th Asian Beach Games; Jobayer Bin Mahin, who was selected for the primary squad of the Bangladesh under-18 national handball team as a goalkeeper; and Miva For, who was selected for trials for the Bangladesh under-16 national handball team. Rashid Udoy is also associated with the school's handball team.

== Gallery ==
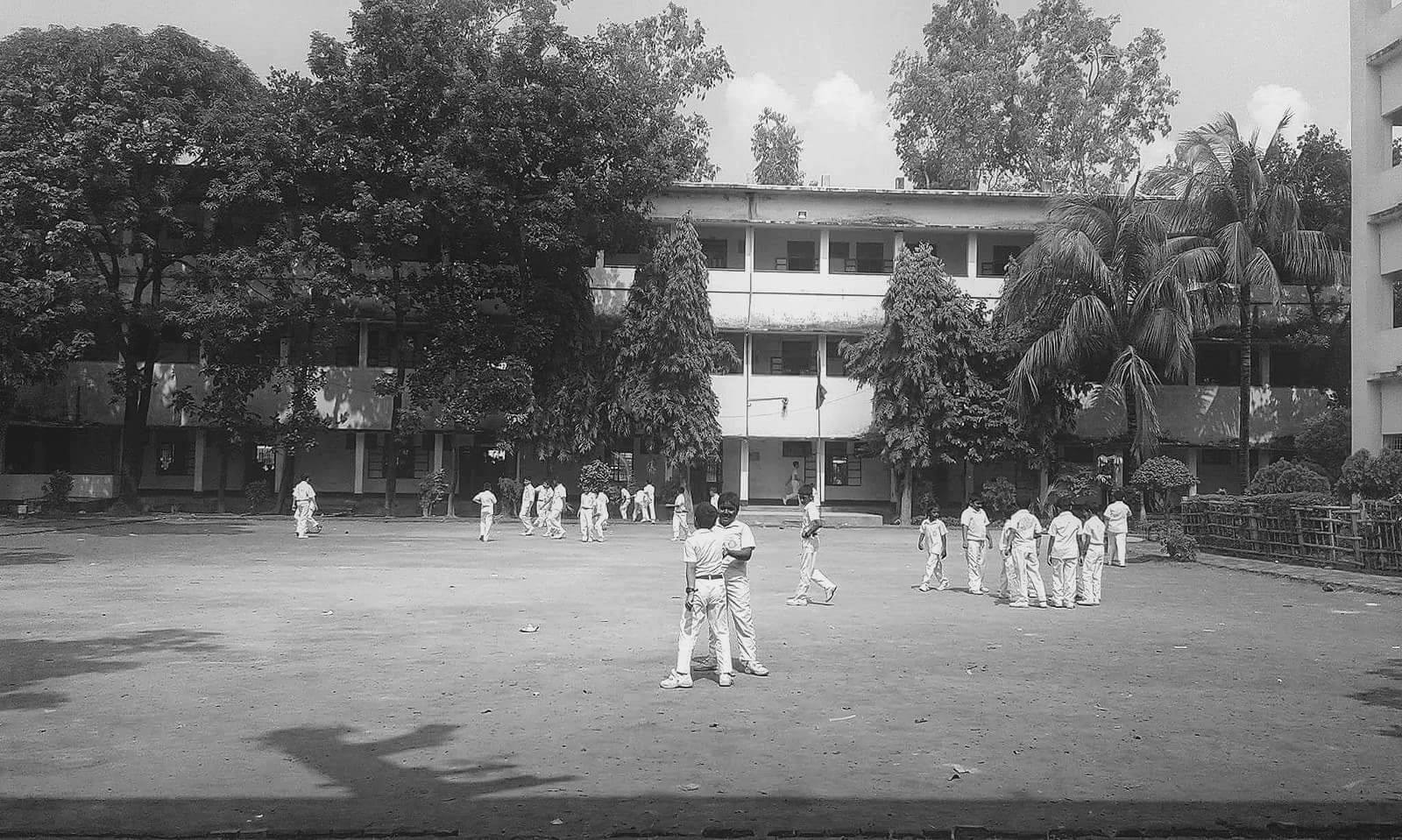
Loitering in Leisure

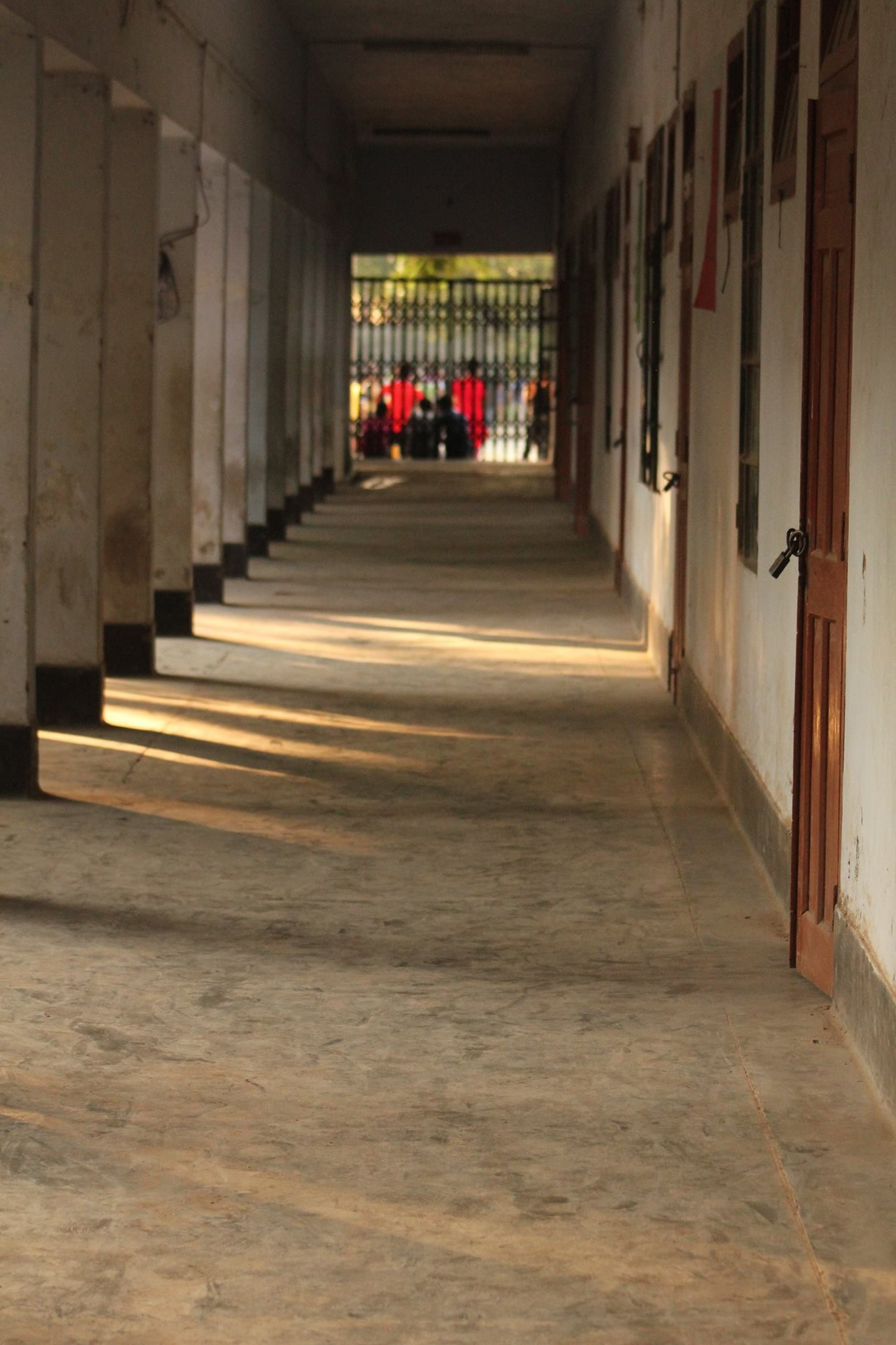
Hallway

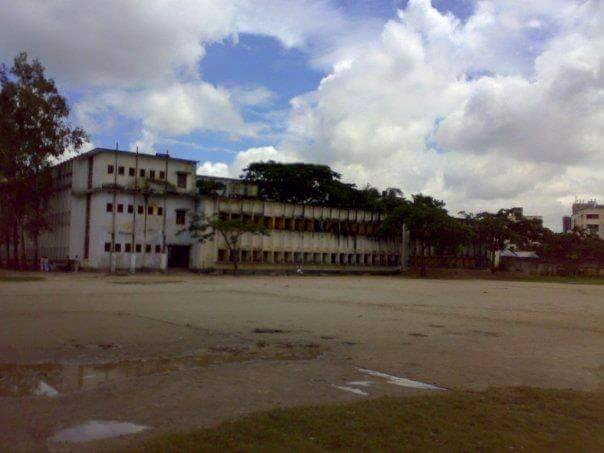
Playground

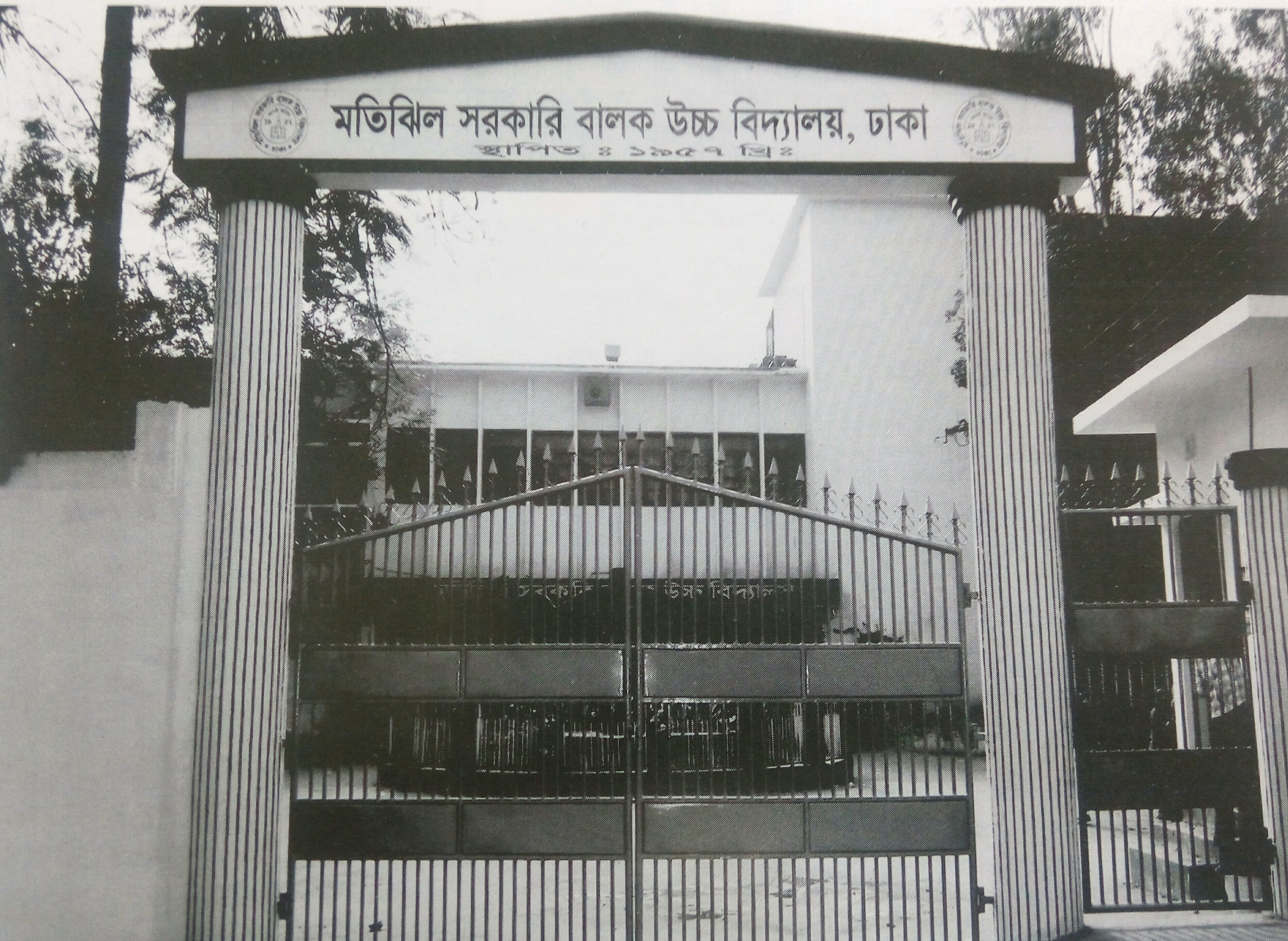
The Main Entrance
