= Rizia Parveen =

Bangladeshi singer

- Born: August 20, 1966 (age 60)
- Origin: Kishorganj, Bangladesh
- Occupation: singer
- Instruments: instrumental, vocal

Rizia Parveen (born August 20) is a Bangladeshi singer. She specializes in play back singing and has done over 600 playback songs. Her popular playback songs includes "Tumi Amar Chad Ami Chaderi Alo", "Premer Naame Mitthey Bolona", "Sotti Kotha Gopon Korona", "Sobar Jibone Prem Ase, Tai Sobai Bhalobase" and "Oh Hero Oh Hero I Love You".

== Early life ==
Parveen was born in Kishorganj but grew up in Rajshahi District in Bangladesh. Her father Abdul Hasid was a business man. She has four brothers and two sisters. As a child, she used to play the harmonium. Parveen graduated from Rajshahi University.

== Career ==
Parveen has released 24 solo musical albums. Her first solo album named Prem was released in 1993. Parveen first gave her voice for play back song in Azharul Islam Khan's movie Talakq(film) Talak.

== Politics ==
In 2017. She was included as a vice-president in the 30-member (partial) national executive committee of Jatiotabadi Samajik Sangskritik Sangstha (JASAS), an affiliate of the Bangladesh Nationalist Party (BNP).

== Discography ==
- Tara vora rat (solo)
- Chokher e Mayayai (solo)
- sukhi hote chai (Duet)
- Mukhe Mukhe rote jabe (Duet)
- Bristy (Duet)
- Chupi chupi bolo (duet)
- E Deher Pran
- 12 kanna
- Chotto ekta valobasha (duet)
- Ektai sopno (Album)
- Ei buke tomake pete chai (Album)
- Prodip jole (duet)
- Prem kokhono kadai (Album)
- Hason raza o lalon shah er gan (Album)
- Exclusive songita top chart (Album)
- Pasa (Album)

== Jingles ==
Year	Product	Song	Composer(s)	Songwriter(s)	Co-artist(s)
2004	Brittle Biscuit	"Raag Koirona Bondhu Amar"	N/A	N/A	Andrew Kishore

== Awards ==
- Asian Journalism of human rights cultural foundation celebrates 17th anniversary, NISCHA chairman awarded
- National child artiste award in 1980
- Best Singer, Dhallywood Film and Music Award (2008)
- Popular Singer of the year, Bangladesh cultural Reporters association(2006)
- Fulkoli Award for Song (2001)
- CJFB, Best playback singer female (2005)
- BCRA, Best playback singer of the year (2008)
- Virginia people Entertainment Award (2003)
- Popular singer, Daily Nobochatona (2016)
- Sawdeshi sanskriti shilpi gosti Award (2009)
- Dhaka Film and Media institute compliments (2012)
- Bangladesh Cultural Reporters Award(2002)
- Forbana Newyork Award (2000)
- TDF Playback Female Singer, Television Dorshok Forum (2008)
- Shako Telefilm Award (2002)
- Best Band Singer, TRAB (2002)
- Best Singer, Mizaf Creative Award (2012)
- Best Playback singer, BCF (2008)
