= The World University =

Former distance learning school in Benson, Arizona

The World University (WU) was an educational institution based in Benson, Arizona, United States. It was dedicated to education in esoteric, spiritual, and non-traditional subjects.

== History ==
It was founded by H. John Zitko (1911–2003), who served as WU's president. The World University Roundtable, the university's parent corporation, was proposed in Los Angeles, California, on December 21, 1946, and formed as a nonprofit corporation on February 24, 1947. The World University was established on December 21, 1967, by the Roundtable membership.

In 1969, WU purchased a complex of buildings in Tucson, Arizona, which served as the university's campus. In 1985, WU purchased an 80-acre (320,000 m^{2}) property, the "Desert Sanctuary Campus," located at the foot of the Rincon Mountain Range near Benson, Arizona, and in 1987 completed the move of its operations to the latter location. After Dr. Zitko's death in 2003, interest in the University has waned. The Benson property was sold and the money is held in trust by Beth Zitko, Dr. Zitko's daughter. Very little is being done with the World University except for the sale of Dr. Zitko's Lemurian Theo-Christic Conception lessons.
