= Billy Long =

American politician (born 1955)

- Official portrait, 2026

United States Ambassador to Iceland
- Incumbent
- Assumed office August 10, 2026
- President: Donald Trump
- Preceded by: Carrin Patman

51st Commissioner of Internal Revenue
- In office June 16, 2025 – August 8, 2025
- President: Donald Trump
- Deputy: Gary Shapley
- Preceded by: Daniel Werfel
- Succeeded by: Scott Bessent (acting)

Member of the U.S. House of Representatives from Missouri's 7th district
- In office January 3, 2011 – January 3, 2023
- Preceded by: Roy Blunt
- Succeeded by: Eric Burlison

Personal details
- Born: William Hollis Long II; August 11, 1955 (age 71) Springfield, Missouri, U.S.
- Party: Republican
- Spouse: Barbara Long (m. 1984)
- Children: 2
- Awards: Order of the Rising Sun
- Long's voice Long jokingly auctions Laura Loomer's phone in a committee hearing. Recorded September 5, 2018

William Hollis Long II (born August 11, 1955) is an American politician, diplomat, and auctioneer who is currently serving as United States Ambassador to Iceland since August 2026. A member of the Republican Party, Long also served as the 51st commissioner of internal revenue from June to August 2025 and as U.S. representative for Missouri's 7th congressional district from 2011 to 2023.

Long was elected to fill the district's seat in 2010, succeeding Roy Blunt upon his election to the U.S. Senate. The district included much of the southwestern quadrant of the state and was anchored in Springfield. It also included Branson and Joplin. After Blunt announced he would not run for re-election to the Senate in 2022, Long became a candidate in the 2022 senate race to succeed him but lost the Republican primary to Eric Schmitt.

Long was nominated by President Donald Trump to serve as commissioner of the Internal Revenue Service. He was confirmed by the U.S. Senate in June 2025 and took office the following month. On August 8, 2025, The New York Times reported Long was being removed by Trump in preparation for an ambassadorship to Iceland.

Long was nominated to serve as U.S. ambassador to Iceland. While awaiting confirmation, he served as a senior advisor at the Office of Personnel Management. His nomination was confirmed by the U.S. Senate in May 2026. Long has claimed that Iceland should become the 52nd U.S. state.

== Early life and education ==
William Hollis Long II was born in Springfield on August 11, 1955. He is a fourth-generation native of Missouri. He graduated from the K–12 Greenwood Laboratory School in 1973. He attended the University of Missouri from 1973 to 1976 but did not graduate. Long then attended and later graduated in 1979 from Missouri Auction School, based in Kansas City. In 1983, he received a professional designation from the Certified Auctioneers Institute, hosted at Indiana University Bloomington.

== Early career ==
Long was an auctioneer and owned Billy Long Auctions, LLC, from 1979 to 2011. He was named Best Auctioneer in the Ozarks for seven years in a row. In 2016, he was inducted into the National Auction Association Hall of Fame after his 2009 induction into the Missouri Professional Auctioneers Association Hall of Fame. He was a talk radio show host on Springfield-based station KWTO and a realtor part-time. He is a member of the National Association of Realtors, National Auction Association, the Springfield Area Chamber of Commerce, the National Rifle Association of America, and the Greater Springfield Board of Realtors. He was also the former president of the Missouri Auctioneers' Association.

== U.S. House of Representatives ==
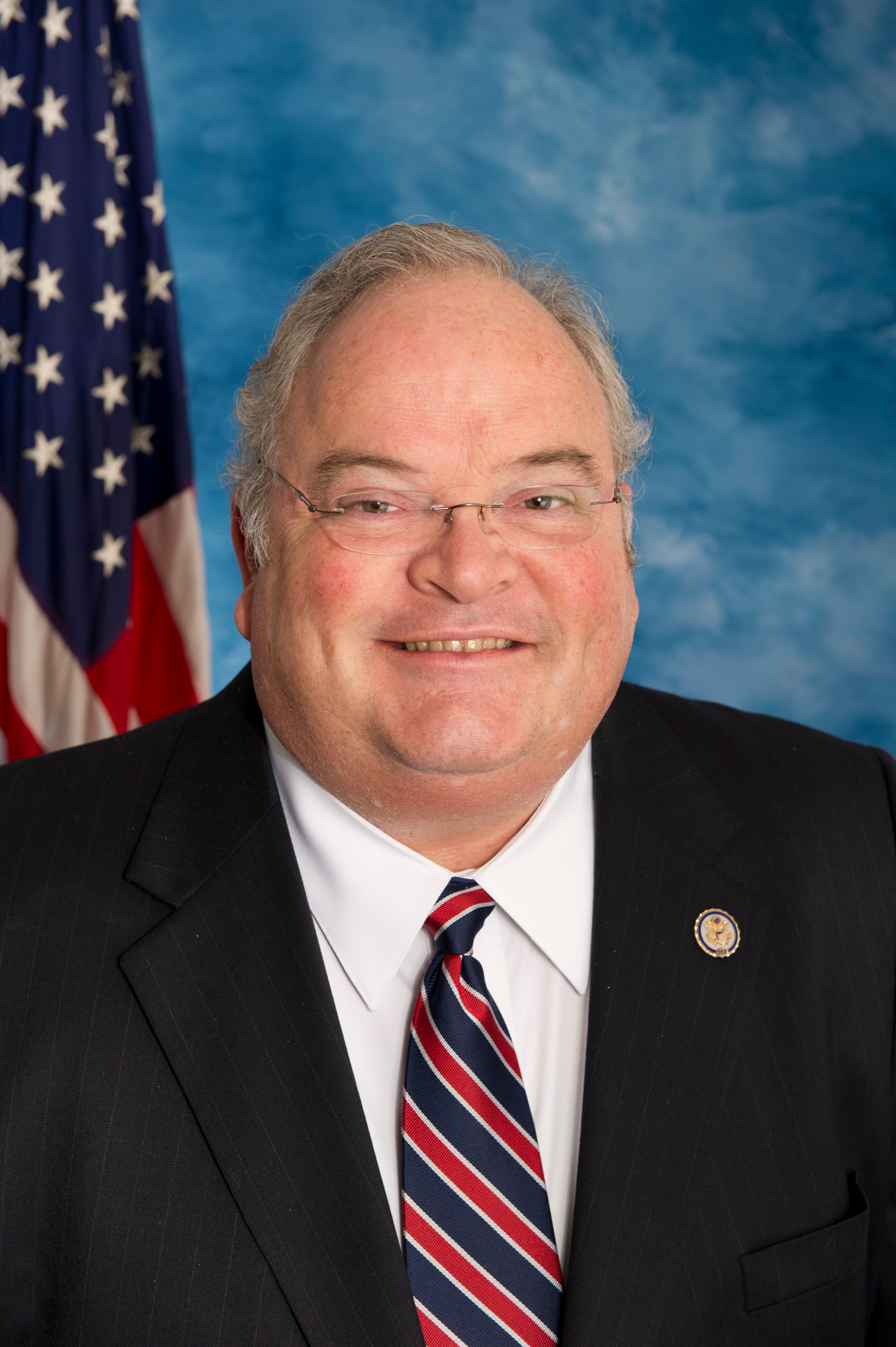
Long's official congressional portrait in 2011

Long was a member of the U.S. House of Representatives from 2011 to 2023.

Long was among the 75 Republican cosponsors to the Fair Tax Act (H.R. 25/S. 18), first introduced in 2015 by Representative Rob Woodall (R-GA) and then again in 2017. The bill would have phased out all IRS funding and abolished the IRS in 2019. It also would have scrapped the income tax system and replaced it with a 23% national retail sales tax, administered primarily by the states.

During a September 2018 House Committee on Energy and Commerce hearing on alleged anti-conservative bias on social media, far-right Internet personality Laura Loomer interrupted the meeting. Long began a mock auction chant, pretending he was selling Loomer's mobile phone, until she was escorted out. The incident generated considerable laughter and applause from the audience.

In September 2018, in response to sexual assault allegations against Supreme Court nominee Brett Kavanaugh, Long retweeted a Twitter post comparing the allegations to a "kiss on the forehead".

In December 2021, Long was given the Order of the Rising Sun on behalf of the emperor of Japan in recognition of Long's "significant contributions to deepening bilateral relations and promoting legislative exchanges between Japan and the United States".

== 2022 U.S. Senate campaign ==
Long announced on August 3, 2021, that he would run in the 2022 United States Senate election in Missouri. Long joined a crowded field of candidates, including former Governor of Missouri Eric Greitens, Attorney General of Missouri Eric Schmitt, fellow United States Representative Vicky Hartzler, and President Pro Tempore of the Missouri Senate Dave Schatz.

Long came in fourth place, receiving 5% of the vote.

== Return to the private sector ==
=== Tax consulting ===
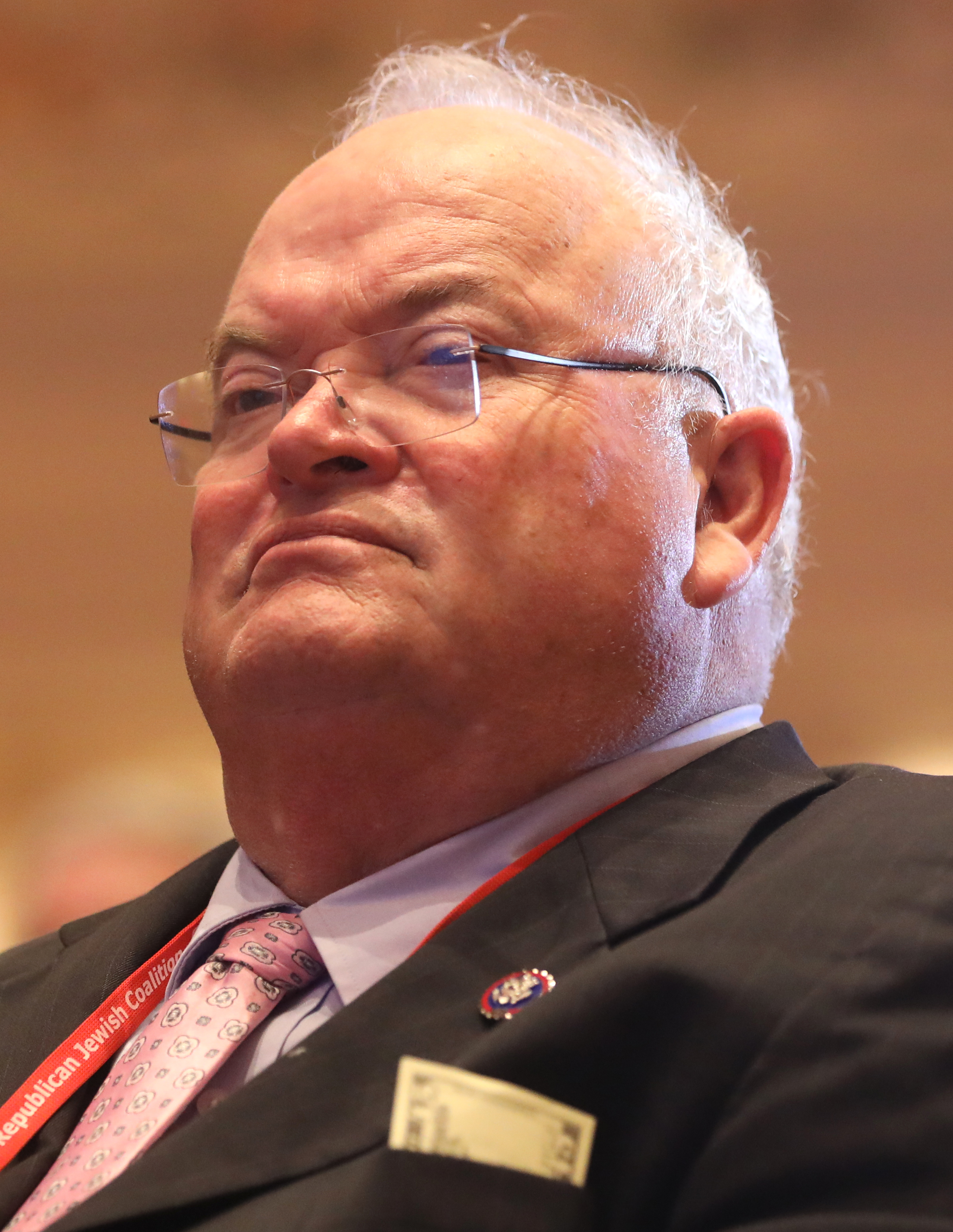
Long in 2023

In 2023, Long worked as a salesperson for Lifetime Advisors and Commerce Terrace Consulting, two companies that encourage clients to apply for tax credits and subsequently take a cut of the benefits. On his X profile, Long self-describes as a "Certified Tax & Business Advisor". The "Certified Tax & Business Advisor" certificate was given to Long after he attended a three-day course offered by a Florida tax consultancy.

At Lifetime Advisors, Long encouraged eligible clients to apply for a tax credit, the Employee Retention Credit (ERC), for which the IRS temporarily stopped accepting applications because a large number of firms were making improper claims. Lifetime Advisors took an expansive view of eligibility for the tax credit, sometimes even challenging clients who did not believe they qualified. Companies that erroneously apply for the credit are at risk of having to pay penalties to the IRS. The IRS has warned companies not to rely on companies that ask for a cut of a tax credit. Lifetime has helped companies claim $1.3 billion in ERTC tax credits. In a September 2023 interview, Long stated that he helped only eligible companies claim the credit. The credit itself has cost the government $230 billion.

In 2024, Long lobbied in Washington, D.C., for the IRS to approve more tax credit claims.

=== Real estate ===
In July 2023, Long became a realtor with Murney Associates.

== Trump administration ==
=== Commissioner of Internal Revenue ===
On December 4, 2024, President-elect Donald Trump announced his intention to nominate Long to serve as the commissioner of the Internal Revenue Service. During his time in Congress, Long repeatedly sponsored bills to abolish the IRS. President Trump "described him as a 'people person' who was 'well respected on both sides of the aisle.'"

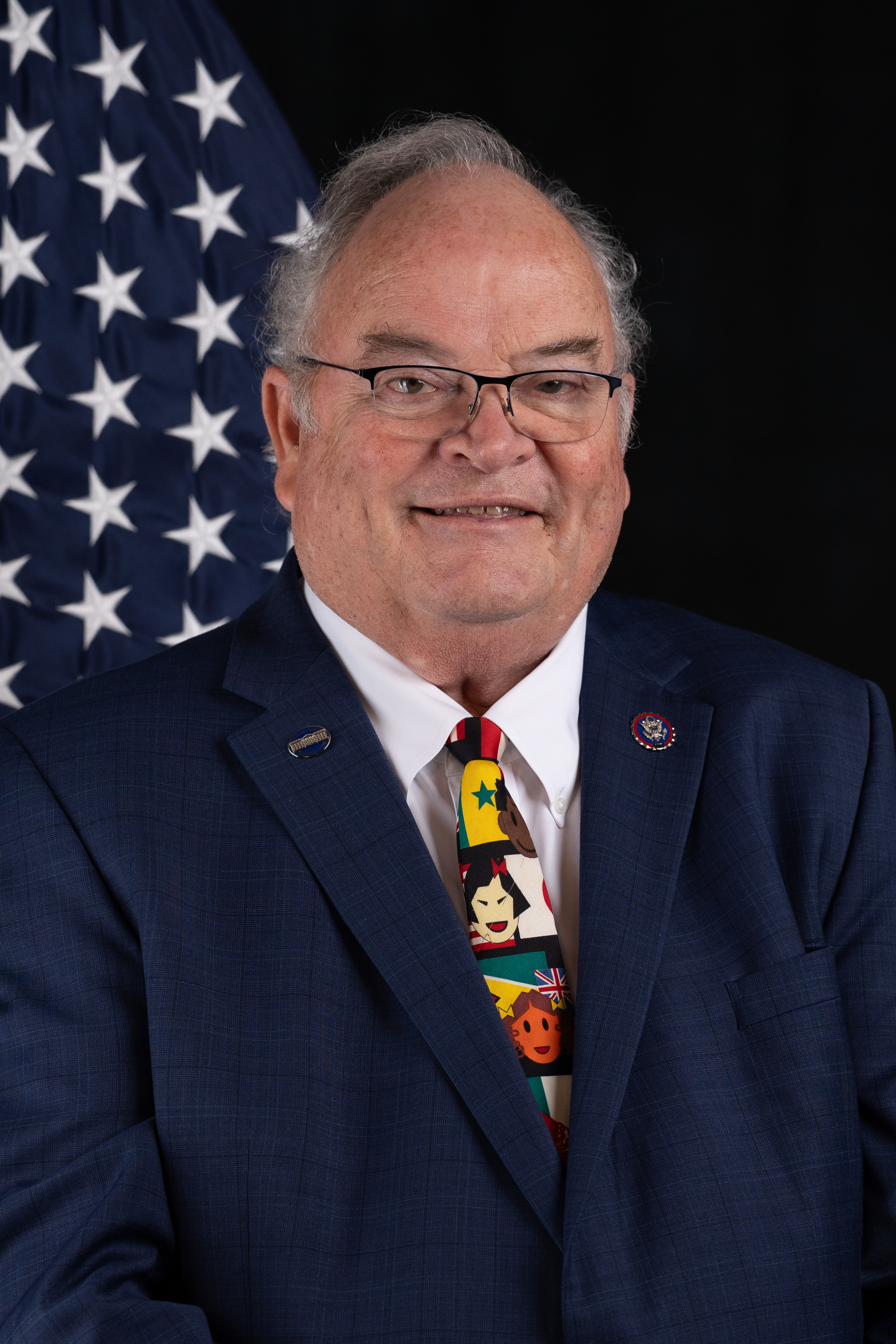
IRS Portrait, 2025

Long was an early and enthusiastic supporter of Donald Trump. Long's experience in the tax industry is less than a typical IRS commissioner, but his twelve years in the U.S. House of Representatives is the most of any IRS commissioner since at least 1900, commissioners typically coming from other federal bureaucratic posts or private practice. Long has previously called for abolishing the IRS, as well as replacing much of the tax code with a flat tax.

In January 2025, following his nomination to head the IRS, Long received nearly $137,000 in campaign contributions to his Senate campaign committee, which had raised less than $36,000 during the previous two years. Long then paid himself $130,000 in remuneration for the outstanding portion of a $250,000 loan he had made to his 2022 US Senate campaign. Watchdog groups noted the "highly unusual" nature of a failed candidate being given donations after being nominated to a position where he could influence government policy for those donors.

Republican senator Mike Crapo stated that he was looking forward to Long's ideas on the agency. The National Taxpayers Union, a conservative advocacy organization, praised President Trump's selection for Long to lead the agency in reform. Jason Smith, the House Ways and Means chairman, also praised Trump's choice to lead the tax-collection agency, stating that: "I couldn’t have picked anyone better."

However, some Democrats raised concern. Senator Ron Wyden of Oregon criticized President Trump for wanting to replace Danny Werfel, who later stepped down as commissioner on January 20, 2025, and Long's involvement with the scam-plagued Employee Retention Credit. House representative Don Beyer, who serves on the House Ways and Means Tax Subcommittee, echoed his support for Werfel to complete his term, and dismay at Long's lack of qualifications and previous efforts to eliminate the agency he was nominated to lead.

In March 2025, while Long's IRS nomination was pending in the Senate, he was appointed as a senior advisor in the Office of Personnel Management. In June, Talking Points Memo reported that Long was said by Senator Ron Wyden (Democrat of Oregon) to be earning $195,200, "which is the maximum salary for a federal worker in Washington D.C.," in this position, while Long's "internal OPM calendar . . . shows him averaging less than three items per week over the past three months".

Long was confirmed by the U.S. Senate on June 12, 2025, by a 53–44 vote. He was sworn in four days later on June 16, 2025.

On August 8, 2025, President Trump removed Long as IRS commissioner, less than two months after his confirmation. Treasury Secretary Scott Bessent became acting commissioner.

=== Ambassador to Iceland ===
On his removal as IRS commissioner, Trump had asked Long to become his ambassador to Iceland. Long was vetted as competent to serve in the post by the State Department in November 2025. Long was nominated to serve as the U.S. Ambassador to Iceland.

During his confirmation hearing, Long suggested that Iceland could become the 52nd U.S. state, amid rising tensions over Greenland, the threats from Donald Trump about making Canada become the 51st state of USA, and the 2026 United States intervention in Venezuela. This resulted in an Icelandic petition demanding that Long should be rejected as an ambassador to Iceland.

While awaiting confirmation, he served as a Senior Advisor for the Office of Personnel Management.

Long was narrowly confirmed by the U.S. Senate on May 18, 2026 by a 46 to 43 vote, and presented his credentials on August 10, 2026.

== Political positions ==
=== Donald Trump ===
Long was an early enthusiastic supporter of Donald Trump and claimed to have coined the phrase "getting on the Trump train." Trump has praised him, saying, "He (Billy) is an extremely hard worker, and respected by all, especially by those who know him in Congress."

After Joe Biden won the 2020 presidential election and Donald Trump refused to concede, Long pushed Trump's false claims of voter fraud in the election. In December 2020, Long supported an amicus brief in support of Texas v. Pennsylvania, a lawsuit filed at the United States Supreme Court contesting the results of the election based on allegations of fraud.

Long supported President Donald Trump's 2017 executive order banning entry to the U.S. to citizens of seven Muslim-majority countries.

=== Energy ===
Long served on the Energy and Commerce Committee during his entirety in Congress. He advocated for access to affordable energy for Americans. In 2010, he signed the No Climate Pledge by AFP. Long was a proponent of drilling for oil, voting for opening the outer continental shelf to oil drilling. During the Russian invasion of Ukraine, Long called for the sanctioning of Russia's oil to cut off Putin's ability to wage war.

=== Tax ===
Long has stated that he is open to either a flat tax or a fair tax as a way to fix the American tax system. He has voted in support of tax relief and said that the government takes too much, penalizes success, and has created a tax code that is too complex.

In his first year of Congress, Long co-sponsored the Fair Tax Act of 2011. This bill called for the replacement of income tax and estate tax with 23% sales tax. Also in 2011, he was part of a push to get the IRS to launch a probe of the tax-exempt status of the Humane Society of the United States. The letter followed the Humane Society's support of a successful Missouri ballot measure strengthening regulations on dog breeders. In 2015, Long co-sponsored H.R.25 & S.155, a bill to "promote freedom, fairness, and economic opportunity by repealing the income tax and other taxes, abolishing the Internal Revenue Service, and enacting a national sales tax to be administered primarily by the States." In December 2024, he was appointed to lead the IRS, the organization he previously called to abolish in that vote.

=== Healthcare ===
In 2014, Long introduced the Taxpayer Transparency Act. The bill required that federal agencies label any distributed promotional or educational material carry the "paid for by taxpayers" label. The act was a response to a multi-million-dollar ad campaign by the Department of Health and Human Services to promote the Affordable Care Act. The bill passed the House, amended, before the Senate then passed it on to the Committee on Homeland Security and Governmental Affairs.

=== Gun control ===
Long opposed stricter gun control measures, including universal background checks and red-flag laws. He argued that such measures infringe on Second Amendment rights and would not effectively prevent gun violence. In 2022, in an interview following the Uvalde school shooting, Long blamed the increase in mass shootings on society's lack of respect for human life, which he believes began with the legalization of abortion.

Long was repeatedly endorsed by the National Rifle Association of America, earning an "A" rating from them for his demonstrated record of being a pro-gun congressman.

=== Violence Against Women Act ===
In 2013, Long voted no on re-authorizing the Violence Against Women Act.

=== Abortion ===
Long holds a pro-life position on abortion. He has supported efforts to limit abortion access, including legislation aimed at defunding Planned Parenthood, and co-sponsored the Sanctity of Human Life Act, which proposed to grant full personhood to fertilised embryos. Long has also expressed his support for the overturning of Roe v. Wade and believes that abortion laws should be regulated at the state level. Additionally, he opposes federal funding for abortion services.

In 2015, Long cosponsored the Pain-Capable Unborn Child Protection Act (H.R. 36). This bill sought to prohibit most abortions after 20 weeks of pregnancy.

=== LGBTQ rights ===
In 2015, Long condemned the Supreme Court ruling in Obergefell v. Hodges, which held that same-sex marriage bans violated the U.S. Constitution. In 2022, Long voted against the Respect for Marriage Act, which required all states and territories to recognize same-sex and interracial marriages.

=== Religion ===
Long considers himself to be an advocate for freedom of religion. He voted yes in support of both the First Amendment Defense Act, which aimed to legally protect religious opposition to homosexuality and same-sex marriage as free speech, and H.Con.Res.13, which reaffirmed the use of “In God We Trust” as the official motto of the U.S. government and encouraged use of the motto in public institutions. Long is a member of the First and Calvary Presbyterian Church in Springfield, Missouri.

== Awards ==
- Long was awarded the Order of the Rising Sun by the emperor of Japan in 2021.
- A medical clinic named "Billy Long Medical & Dental Education Center" by Jordan Valley Community Health Center
- Outstanding Young Alumni Award from Greenwood Laboratory School, Missouri State
- National Auctioneers Association Hall of Fame
- Guardian of Small Business Award by the National Federation of Independent Business
- National Association of Manufacturers Award for Manufacturing Legislative Excellence

== Electoral history ==
=== 2022 ===
Results by county: Schmitt: 30–40%; 40–50%; 50–60%; Hartzler: 30–40%; 40–50%; Greitens: 40–50%

Republican primary results
Party	Candidate	Votes	%
Republican	Eric Schmitt	299,282	45.6
Republican	Vicky Hartzler	144,903	22.1
Republican	Eric Greitens	124,155	18.9
Republican	Billy Long	32,603	5.0
Republican	Mark McCloskey	19,540	3.0
Republican	Dave Schatz	7,509	1.1
Republican	Patrick A. Lewis	6,085	0.9
Republican	Curtis D. Vaughn	3,451	0.5
Republican	Eric McElroy	2,805	0.4
Republican	Robert Allen	2,111	0.3
Republican	C. W. Gardner	2,044	0.3
Republican	Dave Sims	1,949	0.3
Republican	Bernie Mowinski	1,602	0.2
Republican	Deshon Porter	1,574	0.2
Republican	Darrell Leon McClanahan III	1,139	0.2
Republican	Rickey Joiner	1,084	0.2
Republican	Robert Olson	1,081	0.2
Republican	Dennis Lee Chilton	755	0.1
Republican	Russel Pealer Breyfogle Jr.	685	0.1
Republican	Kevin C. Schepers	681	0.1
Republican	Hartford Tunnell	637	0.1
Total votes		655,675	100.0

=== 2010 ===
Republican primary

Long joined the race for the 7th Congressional District after incumbent U.S. representative Roy Blunt chose to run for the U.S. Senate seat being vacated by Kit Bond. In the crowded seven-way Republican primary—the de facto election in the state's most Republican district—Long won with 36% of the vote.

Missouri's 7th district Republican primary, August 3, 2010
Party	Candidate	Votes	%
Republican	Billy Long	38,218	36.56
Republican	Jack Goodman	30,401	29.08
Republican	Gary Nodler	14,561	13.93
Republican	Darrell Moore	9,312	8.91
Republican	Jeff Wisdom	4,552	4.36
Republican	Mike Moon	4,473	4.28
Republican	Steve Hunter	2,173	2.08
Republican	Michael Wardell	844	0.81
Total votes		104,534	100.00

General election

2010 election for U.S. Representative of Missouri's 7th Congressional District
Party	Candidate	Votes	%
Republican	Billy Long	141,010	63.39
Democratic	Scott Eckersley	67,545	30.37
Libertarian	Kevin Craig	13,866	6.23
Write-In	Others	10	0.00

=== 2012 ===
2012 election for U.S. Representative of Missouri's 7th Congressional District
Party	Candidate	Votes	%
Republican	Billy Long	203,565	63.87
Democratic	Jim Evans	98,498	30.90
Libertarian	Kevin Craig	16,668	5.23
Write-In	Others	9	0.00

=== 2014 ===
In the August 5 Republican primary, Long defeated Marshall Works, 62.4% to 37.6%.

2014 election for U.S. Representative of Missouri's 7th Congressional District
Party	Candidate	Votes	%
Republican	Billy Long	104,054	63.46
Democratic	Jim Evans	47,282	28.84
Libertarian	Kevin Craig	12,584	7.68
Write-In	Others	37	0.02

=== 2016 ===
In the August 2 Republican primary, Long defeated Nathan Clay, Christopher Batsche, Matthew Evans, Lyndle Spencer, Matthew Canovi, James Nelson and Mary Byrne.

2016 election for U.S. Representative of Missouri's 7th Congressional District
Party	Candidate	Votes	%
Republican	Billy Long	228,692	67.5
Democratic	Genevieve Williams	92,756	27.4
Libertarian	Benjamin Brixey	17,153	5.1
Write-In	Others	6	0.0

=== 2018 ===
In the Republican primary, Long defeated Jim Evans, Lance Norris, and Benjamin Holcomb. In the general election, he defeated Democratic nominee Jamie Schoolcraft, who had defeated Kenneth Hatfield, John Farmer de la Torre, and Vincent Jennings in the Democratic primary.

2018 election for U.S. Representative of Missouri's 7th Congressional District
Party	Candidate	Votes	%
Republican	Billy Long	195,872	66.3
Democratic	Jamie Schoolcraft	88,642	30
Libertarian	Benjamin Brixey	10,833	3.7
Write-In	Others	270	0.1

=== 2020 ===
In the August 4 Republican primary, Long defeated Eric Harleman, Kevin VanStory, Steve Chetnik and Camille Lombardi-Olive.

Missouri's 7th congressional district, 2020
Party	Candidate	Votes	%
Republican	Billy Long	254,318	68.9
Democratic	Teresa Montseny	98,111	26.6
Libertarian	Kevin Craig	15,573	4.2
Independent	Audrey Richards (write-in)	1,279	0.3
Write-in		2	0.0

=== Committee assignments ===
- Committee on Energy and Commerce
  - Subcommittee on Energy and Power
  - Subcommittee on Communications and Technology
  - Subcommittee on Health
- Committee on Transportation and Infrastructure
- Committee on Homeland Security
- Republican Steering Committee

=== Caucus memberships ===
- Congressional Arts Caucus
- Congressional Constitution Caucus

U.S. House of Representatives
Preceded by Roy Blunt	Member of the U.S. House of Representatives from Missouri's 7th congressional district 2011–2023	Succeeded by Eric Burlison
Government offices
Preceded by Michael Faulkender; Acting	Commissioner of Internal Revenue; 2025	Succeeded by Scott Bessent; Acting
Diplomatic posts
Preceded by Erin Sawyer; Acting	United States Ambassador to Iceland; Taking office 2026	Designate
U.S. order of precedence (ceremonial)
Preceded by Vicky Hartzler as Former U.S. Representative	Order of precedence of the United States as Former U.S. Representative	Succeeded by Mike Ross as Former U.S. Representative
