= Jón úr Vör =

Icelandic poet

Jón úr Vör (1917–2000) was an Icelandic poet. He has been credited, along with Steinn Steinarr, as being one of those who brought a modernist approach into Icelandic poetry. This was through the publication of his book of poems in 1946 entitled Þorpið (The Village).

== Selected publications ==
- Jón úr Vör. (1956) Þorpið, Reykjavík: Heimskringla.
- Steinn Steinarr, Jón úr Vör, Matthías Johannessen, and Marshall Brement (1985) Three modern Icelandic poets: selected poems of Steinn Steinarr, Jón úr Vör and Matthías Johannessen. Reykjavík, Iceland: Iceland Review.
