= Jeffrey Ross (disambiguation) =

Jeff Ross (born 1965) is an American stand-up comedian and actor.

Jeffrey Ross may also refer to:

- Jeffrey Ross Gunter, American dermatologist and diplomat
- Jeffrey Ross Toobin (born 1960), American lawyer and author
