= NRST =

NRST may refer to:

- National retail sales tax
- Non-Resident Speculation Tax, a real-estate tax levied in the Golden Horseshoe
- Nancy Grace Roman Space Telescope, NASA infrared satellite telescope
- School of Natural Resources Science and Technology, former name of the Beaverton, Oregon, USA, high school School of Science and Technology
