= List of shipwrecks in October 1868 =

The list of shipwrecks in October 1868 includes ships sunk, foundered, grounded, or otherwise lost during October 1868.

== 1 October ==
List of shipwrecks: 1 October 1868
Ship	State	Description
Elizabeth	United Kingdom	The brig ran aground on the William Bank, in the White Sea. She was abandoned the next day. Two of her seven crew subsequently died.

== 2 October ==
List of shipwrecks: 2 October 1868
Ship	State	Description
Alin	United Kingdom	The schooner was wrecked on Skierenaffin, in the Sound of Islay. She was on a voyage from Glasgow, Renfrewshire to Fort William, Inverness-shire.
Diana	United Kingdom	The steamship ran aground on the Maplin Sand, in the North Sea off the coast of Essex. She was refloated.
Fremad	Danzig	The ship was driven ashore. She was on a voyage from Danzig to Dublin, United Kingdom.
Gunso	Norway	The ship ran aground on the Galloper Sand. She was on a voyage from Piteå, Sweden to London, United Kingdom. She was refloated and taken in to Dover, Kent, United Kingdom in a leaky condition.
Harkaway	United Kingdom	The ship was driven ashore. She was on a voyage from Stettin to Leith, Lothian. She was refloated and towed in to Granton, Lothian.
Heinrich	Rostock	The barque was driven ashore and wrecked on the west coast of Jutland. She was on a voyage from Grangemouth, Stirlingshire, United Kingdom to Rostock.
Josephine	United Kingdom	The ship foundered in the North Sea. Her crew were rescued by Union (United Kingdom). Josephine was on a voyage from Grimsby, Lincolnshire to Christiania, Norway.
Komna	Greece	The ship caught fire at Navarino and was scuttled.
Peace and Plenty	United Kingdom	The ship was driven ashore at Dunbar, Lothian in a capsized condition.
Siff	Canada	The ship departed from Falmouth, Cornwall for Boston, Lincolnshire, United Kingdom. No further trace, presumed foundered with the loss of all hands.
Utility	United Kingdom	The ship ran aground on the Galloper Sand. She was on a voyage from South Shields, County Durham to Dunkirk, Nord. She was refloated the next day and taken in to Dover in a leaky condition.

== 3 October ==
List of shipwrecks: 3 October 1868
Ship	State	Description
Ann	United Kingdom	The ship was wrecked in the Sound of Islay. She was on a voyage from Glasgow, Renfrewshire to Fort William, Inverness-shire.
Blanche	United Kingdom	The schooner was driven ashore and wrecked at Cape Henry, Virginia, United States. She was on a voyage from Great Isaac Cay, Bahamas to Baltimore, Maryland, United States.
Orion	United Kingdom	The ship was destroyed by fire at Paraíba, Brazil.
Zodiac	United Kingdom	The ship ran aground in the Sunda Strait. She was on a voyage from Singapore, Straits Settlements to London. She was refloated and put in to Anjer, Netherlands East Indies.
No. 43	United Kingdom	The pilot boat was run down and sunk in the English Channel off the Isle of Wight by Syria (United Kingdom) with the loss of all four people on board.

== 4 October ==
List of shipwrecks: 4 October 1868
Ship	State	Description
Fame	United Kingdom	The barque was driven ashore near "Jakli", Russia. She was refloated.
Vier Gebroeders	Netherlands	The ship was abandoned in the North Sea. Her crew were rescued by Vertrouwen (Belgium). Vier Gebroeders was on a voyage from the Meuse (Dutch: Maas) to Newcastle upon Tyne, Northumberland, United Kingdom.

== 5 October ==
List of shipwrecks: 5 October 1868
Ship	State	Description
Dream	United Kingdom	The ship was wrecked on The Needles, Isle of Wight. She was on a voyage from Newport, Monmouthshire to Southampton, Hampshire.
Emily	United Kingdom	The ship was wrecked on the Taylor Reef, off "Lamley Island". Her crew were rescued. She was on a voyage from Maryport, Cumberland to Dublin.
Hero	United Kingdom	The ship ran aground west of Point Molinos, Spain. She was on a voyage from Alexandria, Egypt to Falmouth, Cornwall. She was refloated on 7 October and towed in to Málaga, Spain.
Isabella	United Kingdom	The schooner sank in the North Sea 90 nautical miles (170 km) off the coast of Norway. Her crew were rescued by the brig Anne Mariana (United Kingdom). Isabella was on a voyage from Fraserburgh, Aberdeenshire to Stettin.
Mersey	United Kingdom	The ship caught fire at Lindisfarne, Northumberland. She was on a voyage from Sunderland, County Durham to Arbroath, Forfarshire.
Naomi	United Kingdom	The ship struck a sunken wrecked 10 nautical miles (19 km) south west of the Old Head of Kinsale, County Cork.
Perseverance	United States	The steamship caught fire and sank in Lake Ontario with the loss of fourteen of her nineteen crew. She was on a voyage from Buffalo to Oswego, New York.

== 6 October ==
List of shipwrecks: 6 October 1868
Ship	State	Description
Dream	United Kingdom	The ship was driven ashore and wrecked in The Needles, Isle of Wight. Her crew survived. She was on a voyage from Newport, Monmouthshire to Southampton, Hampshire.
Geertje Dykstra	Netherlands	The ship was driven ashore and wrecked at Løkken-Vrå, Denmark. Her crew were rescued. She was on a voyage from Middelburg, Zeeland to Memel, Prussia.
Sir James Duke	United Kingdom	The steamship collided with another vessel and sank in the Girond at Pauillac, Gironde, France. She was on a voyage from Cardiff, Glamorgan to Bordeaux, Gironde.
Victoria	United Kingdom	The schooner struck a sunken pile at the mouth of the River Tees and sank. She was on a voyage from Middlesbrough, Yorkshire to Exeter, Devon. She was refloated on 18 October.

== 7 October ==
List of shipwrecks: 7 October 1868
Ship	State	Description
Diadem	United Kingdom	The ship foundered in the North Sea. Her crew were rescued. She was on a voyage from South Shields, County Durham to London.
Gustav	Wismar	The schooner was driven ashore and wrecked at Berwick upon Tweed, Northumberland, United Kingdom. Her crew were rescued.
Hagen	Norway	The sloop was discovered off Buchan Ness, Aberdeenshire, United Kingdom in a capsized condition. She was taken in to Peterhead, Aberdeenshire.
J. C. Dering	Canada	The schooner capsized off Cape Cod, Massachusetts, United States with the loss of seven of the ten people on board. She was on a voyage from Digby, Nova Scotia to Boston, Massachusetts.
Mangalore	United Kingdom	The ship caught fire in the River Mersey. She was on a voyage from Liverpool, Lancashire to Calcutta, India. The fire was extinguished and she resumed her voyage.
Unnamed	Flag unknown	The schooner capsized and sank off Cuttyhunk, Massachusetts with the loss of all hands.

== 8 October ==
List of shipwrecks: 8 October 1868
Ship	State	Description
Chimborazo	United States	The barque was driven ashore and wrecked south of Tabasco. Her crew were rescued.
Forfar	United States	The schooner sank in Lake Michigan with the loss of four lives.
Swift	United Kingdom	The schooner sprang a leak and foundered off Lundy Island, Devon. Her crew were rescued by the pilot boat No. 8 (United Kingdom). Swift was on a voyage from Cardiff, Glamorgan to Teignmouth, Devon.
Vim	United States	The tug suffered a boiler explosion and sank at New York.

== 9 October ==
List of shipwrecks: 9 October 1868
Ship	State	Description
Mersey	United Kingdom	En route from Sunderland, to Arbroath, Scotland, the schooner sprang a leak in the North Sea off Lindisfarne. Water came in contact with her cargo of quicklime, causing her to catch fire. She was beached, saving the crew, but the vessel was lost.
Rover	United Kingdom	The ship ran aground and sank off Silloth, Cumberland. The only person on board was rescued by the Silloth Lifeboat. She was on a voyage from Skinburness, Cumberland to Annan, Dumfriesshire.

== 10 October ==
List of shipwrecks: 10 October 1868
Ship	State	Description
Alma	United Kingdom	The ship foundered in the North Sea. Her crew survived. She was on a voyage from Newcastle upon Tyne, Northumberland to Exeter, Devon.
Anna	United Kingdom	The ship sprang a leak and sank in the North Sea. Her crew were rescued. She was on a voyage from South Shields, County Durham to Teignmouth, Devon.
Brill	United Kingdom	The ship departed from the Clyde for Saint John, New Brunswick, Canada. No further trace, presumed foundered with the loss of all hands.
Powerful	United Kingdom	The steamship collided with the ferry Tynemouth (United Kingdom) and sank in the River Tyne. Her crew survived.
Joachim	Bremen	The barque was destroyed by fire in the South Atlantic (35°57′S 7°50′W). Her crew were rescued by China (United States) Joachim was on a voyage from Bremen to Rangoon, Burma.
Repeal	United Kingdom	The ship collided with the steamship Marion (United Kingdom) and foundered in the North Sea off Whitby, Yorkshire with the loss of one of her three crew. Survivors were rescued by Marion. Repeal was on a voyage from Rochester, Kent to South Shields, County Durham.
Speedwell	United Kingdom	The ship was assisted in to Grimsby, Lincolnshire in a sinking condition. She was on a voyage from Middlesbrough, Yorkshire to Ipswich, Suffolk.

== 11 October ==
List of shipwrecks: 11 October 1868
Ship	State	Description
Thomas Chalmers	United Kingdom	The collier ran aground on the Oosterbank, in the North Sea off Brouwershaven, Zeeland, Netherlands. She was refloated the next day and taken in to Hellevoetsluis, Zeeland.
Urania	United Kingdom	The steamship ran aground at Saint-Nazaire, Ille-et-Vilaine, France. She was on a voyage from Nantes, Loire-Inférieure, France to Gloucester. She was refloated and beached.

== 12 October ==
List of shipwrecks: 12 October 1868
Ship	State	Description
Fancy	(United Kingdom of Great Britain and Ireland) New Zealand	The schooner was wrecked at Greville Harbour, D'Urville Island with the loss of three of her crew. The sole surviving crewman was rescued by the schooner Jane Anderson.
Manhattan	United Kingdom	The steamship ran aground on the Burbo Bank, in Liverpool Bay. She was on a voyage from New York to Liverpool, Lancashire. She was refloated with the assistance of two tugs and taken in to Liverpool.
Nelson	(United Kingdom of Great Britain and Ireland) New Zealand	The steamer was wrecked when it hit a heavy swell while trying to leave Whanganui Inlet. All those on board were saved.

== 14 October ==
List of shipwrecks: 14 October 1868
Ship	State	Description
George and Anne	United Kingdom	The fishing lugger was run into by the fishing lugger Alma (United Kingdom) and sank in the North Sea 4 nautical miles (7.4 km) off Corton, Suffolk. Her crew were rescued by Alma.
Hibernia	United Kingdom	The ship ran aground in the Dardanelles. She was on a voyage from Taganrog, Russia to Plymouth, Devon. She was refloated with the assistance of a tug and resumed her voyage.
Punjaub	United Kingdom	The ship was driven ashore at Miscou Island, New Brunswick, Canada. She was on a voyage from Liverpool, Lancashire to Bathurst, New Brunswick. She was consequently condemned. Punjaub was refloated on 27 April 1869 and taken in to Bathurst, where she arrived on 4 May.

== 15 October ==
List of shipwrecks: 15 October 1868
Ship	State	Description
Elizabeth	(United Kingdom of Great Britain and Ireland) New Zealand	The cutter was wrecked after being driven ashore on the Otago coast during a gale.
Festina Lente	Argentina	The ship was wrecked on the English Bank, in the River Plate. She was on a voyage from Cardiff, Glamorgan, United Kingdom to Buenos Aires.
Isabella	(United Kingdom of Great Britain and Ireland) New Zealand	The brigantine was driven ashore near Hokitika during a gale.
Woodman	United Kingdom	The ship was wrecked on a reef off Soa Island, Outer Hebrides with the loss of two lives. She was on a voyage from Easdale, Argyllshire to Leith, Lothian.

== 16 October ==
List of shipwrecks: 16 October 1868
Ship	State	Description
Clyde	United Kingdom	The ship was driven ashore in Loch Tarbert. She was on a voyage from Maryport, Cumberland to Londonderry.
Defiance	United Kingdom	The brigantine was driven ashore and severely damaged at Maryport, Cumberland. Her crew were rescued. She was on a voyage from Bangor to Maryport.
Rapid	United Kingdom	The tug caught fire at Greenock, Renfrewshire and was scuttled.
Satellite	(United Kingdom of Great Britain and Ireland) New Zealand	The 27-ton cutter was wrecked on the South Island west coast during a gale.

== 17 October ==
List of shipwrecks: 17 October 1868
Ship	State	Description
C. A. Jones	Canada	The barque ran aground at Cape Canso, Nova Scotia. She was on a voyage from Windsor, Nova Scotia to Liverpool, Lancashire, United Kingdom.
Countess of Selkirk	United Kingdom	The ship was driven ashore and damaged in Buyhouse Bay. She was on a voyage from Buyhouse Bay to Maryport, Cumberland.
Echo	United Kingdom	The ship sprang a leak and foundered in the North Sea. Her crew were rescued by Antina (Netherlands). Echo was on a voyage from Sunderland, County Durham to Dordrecht, South Holland, Netherlands.
Letitia	United Kingdom	The ship capsized at Portsmouth, Hampshire. She was on a voyage from Cardiff, Glamorgan to Portsmouth. She was righted the next day.
Mary Ann	(United Kingdom of Great Britain and Ireland) Guernsey	The cutter was wrecked at Cap Fréhel, Côtes du Nord, France. Her crew were rescued by a pilot boat. She was on a voyage from Pontrieux, Côtes-du-Nord to Guernsey.
Phantom	United Kingdom	The schooner collided with a collier and sank off Whitby, Yorkshire. Her crew survived. She was on a voyage from Sunderland, County Durham to Southampton, Hampshire.
Union	United Kingdom	The steamship foundered with the loss of all 40 crew. She was on a voyage from Cardiff to New York, United States.

== 18 October ==
List of shipwrecks: 18 October 1868
Ship	State	Description
Almo	Russia	The ship put in to Brest, Finistère, France on fire. She was on a voyage from Rangoon, Burma to Cork or Falmouth, Cornwall, United Kingdom.
Maggie Armstrong	United Kingdom	The ship departed from Queenstown, County Cork for Boston, Massachusetts, United States. No further trace, presumed foundered with the loss of all hands.
Margaret	United Kingdom	The ship was driven ashore at Ramsgate, Kent. She was on a voyage from Waterford to Hull, Yorkshire. She was refloated the next day.

== 19 October ==
List of shipwrecks: 19 October 1868
Ship	State	Description
Despatch	United States	The ship was driven ashore in Jeddo Bay.
Louvre	United Kingdom	The ship was abandoned in the Atlantic Ocean and set afire. Her crew were rescued by Jane (United Kingdom). Louvre was on a voyage from Quebec City, Canada to Liverpool, Lancashire.
Orient	United Kingdom	The steamship ran aground at Warnemünde, Prussia. She was on a voyage from Stralsund to Leith, Lothian. She was refloated and put in to Swinemünde, Prussia in a leaky condition.

== 20 October ==
List of shipwrecks: 20 October 1868
Ship	State	Description
Ellen	United Kingdom	The steamship was destroyed by fire off the coast of Loire-Inférieure, France. Her crew were rescued.

== 21 October ==
List of shipwrecks: 21 October 1868
Ship	State	Description
Amelia	United Kingdom	The ship was abandoned off the Tongue Lightship ( Trinity House). Her crew survived.
Annie	United Kingdom	The ship was driven ashore "south of Black". She was on a voyage from Whitehaven, Cumberland to Troon, Ayrshire. She was refloated and towed in to Troon.
Del Norte	United States	Wreck of Del Norte watercolor The 601-ton sternwheel paddle steamer was lost. Sources disagree on the location of the incident. One claims that she was lost at Valdez, Department of Alaska. Another claims that Del Norte was wrecked in fog approximately 50 nautical miles (93 km; 58 mi) north of Victoria, Colony of British Columbia, during a southbound voyage from Sitka, Territory of Alaska. Others place her wreck at Porlier Pass (49°01′00″N 123°35′00″W) in British Columbia.
Esther and Margaret	United Kingdom	The ship collided with Ida (United Kingdom) and was abandoned by her crew, who were rescued by Ida. Esther and Margaret was on a voyage from Whitehaven, Cumberland to Troon, Ayrshire. She came ashore near Whitehaven and sank.
Gladstone	United Kingdom	The ship was driven ashore at L'Islet, Quebec, Canada. She was on a voyage from Glasgow, Renfrewshire to Quebec City, Canada. She was later refloated and taken in to Quebec City in a severely damaged condition.
Henrietta	Flag unknown	The schooner ran aground at the mouth of the Goatzacoalcos River. She was on a voyage from Minatitlán, Mexico to a British port.
Jacques Cartier	Canada	The schooner was wrecked on the coast of Labrador, Newfoundland Colony.
Juligs	Grand Duchy of Mecklenburg-Schwerin	The ship ran aground off Dragør, Denmark. She was on a voyage from Gävle, Sweden to Grimsby, Lincolnshire, United Kingdom.
Mary Curley	United Kingdom	The schooner was driven ashore in Vineyard Sound. She was on a voyage from New York, United States to Saint John's, Newfoundland Colony. She was refloated.

== 22 October ==
List of shipwrecks: 22 October 1868
Ship	State	Description
Argos	United Kingdom	The brig was driven ashore at "Vatergarn", Sweden. She was on a voyage from Riga, Russia to Hartlepool, County Durham. She was consequently condemned.
Australian	United Kingdom	The passenger ship ran ashore and was wrecked north of San Christorão, Brazil. All twenty people on board were rescued. She was on a voyage from Sydney, New South Wales to London.
Christine	Prussia	The ship collided with a British barque in the North Sea. She consequently foundered off the Dudgeon Sandbank the next day. Her crew were rescued. She was on a voyage from South Shields, County Durham, United Kingdom to Messina, Sicily, Italy.
Comet	Bremen	The ship was sighted off the South Foreland, Kent, United Kingdom whilst on a voyage from Bahia, Brazil to Bremen. No further trace, presumed foundered with the loss of all hands.
Congress	United States	While bound for Chicago, Illinois, with a cargo of salt, apples, and railroad iron, the wooden steamer ran aground and burned in Lake Huron on the coast of Michigan near North Point. Her wreck lies in 17 feet (5.2 m) of water at 45.014459°N 83.259048°W.
Devon	United Kingdom	The steamship was wrecked on the Brisson Rock, off the coast of Cornwall with the loss of fourteen lives. A survivor was rescued by the Sennen Lifeboat Matthew Nicholas ( Royal National Lifeboat Institution).
Emma	United Kingdom	The brig was driven ashore and damaged at Falmouth, Cornwall.
Francisco Alvarez	Chile	The ship was wrecked on "Musgora Island". She was on a voyage from Port Gamble, Washington Territory to Valparaíso.
Jules	United Kingdom	The ship collided with the steamship Buda and capsized. Her crew were rescued. She was towed in to Berwick upon Tweed, Northumberland.
Koophandel	Flag unknown	The barque ran aground at Hellevoetsluis, Zeeland, Netherlands.
Perkanos	Sweden	The barque was wrecked at Eckerö, Grand Duchy of Finland. She was on a voyage from Nyhamn to Grimsby, Lincolnshire, United Kingdom.

== 23 October ==
List of shipwrecks: 23 October 1868
Ship	State	Description
Christina	Grand Duchy of Mecklenburg-Schwerin	The schooner collided with a barque in the North Sea. She was on a voyage from South Shields, County Durham, United Kingdom. She foundered the next day off the Dudgeon Lightship ( Trinity House). Her crew were rescued by George (United Kingdom).
Devon	United Kingdom	The lighter was wrecked on the Brisons, off the coast of Cornwall with the loss of eighteen of the nineteen people on board. The Mate, the sole survivor, was rescued the following day from the rocks by the RNLI Sennen Cove lifeboat.
F. T. Barney	United States	F. T. Barney The wooden schooner was on a voyage from Cleveland, Ohio, to Milwaukee, Wisconsin, with a cargo of coal when the schooner T. J. Bronson accidentally rammed her in Lake Huron, sinking her in 160 feet (49 m) of water off the coast of Michigan at 45.485833°N 83.8425°W. Her crew survived.
Governor General	United Kingdom	The ship was driven ashore at Teignmouth, Devon. She was on a voyage from Newcastle upon Tyne, Northumberland to Martinique. She was refloated with assistance from a fishing trawler.
Leichhardt	United Kingdom	The full-rigged ship, anchored near the Girdler Sand, The Nore in the Thames estuary, preparing for her voyage to Wellington, New Zealand, was run into by the steamship North Star (United Kingdom) and cut to the waterline. All 49 people on board were transferred to North Star. She subsequently capsized and was wrecked.
Leo	United Kingdom	The brigantine was driven ashore and severely damaged on Walney Island, Lancashire. She had become a wreck by 29 October.
Martha Ann	United Kingdom	The ship was driven ashore and wrecked east of Wells-next-the-Sea, Norfolk with the loss of a crew member. She was on a voyage from King's Lynn, Norfolk to the River Tyne.
North Hampton	United States	The steamship was run into by the steamship Continental (United States) and sank off Newhaven, Connecticut. All on board were rescued.
Speedwell	United Kingdom	The schooner was run down and sunk in the North Sea by the steamship J. M. Strachan (United Kingdom) with the loss of two of her four crew. Speedwell was on a voyage from Stockton-on-Tees, County Durham to Swansea, Glamorgan.
Venus	United Kingdom	The ship departed from Waterford for Swansea. No further trace, presumed foundered with the loss of all hands.

== 24 October ==
List of shipwrecks: 24 October 1868
Ship	State	Description
Augusta	United Kingdom	The steamship ran aground on the Doom Bar. Her thirteen crew were rescued by the Padstow Lifeboat. She was on a voyage from Saint-Nazaire, Ille-et-Vilaine, France to Liverpool, Lancashire. She was refloated the next day and taken in to Padstow, Cornwall.
Betty and Louise	Hamburg	The barque was driven ashore and wrecked in St Andrews Bay. Her nine crew were rescued by the Broughty Ferry Lifeboat. She was on a voyage from Hamburg to Burntisland, Fife, United Kingdom.
Carrie	United Kingdom	The ship was driven ashore and wrecked at Johnshaven, Aberdeenshire with the loss of all five crew.
Cora	United Kingdom	The schooner foundered off Johnshaven with the loss of all nads. She was on a voyage from Sunderland, County Durham to Aberdeen.
Dahlia	United Kingdom	The schooner ran aground on the Annat Bank, off Montrose, Forfarshire and was wrecked. Her crew were rescued by the Montrose Lifeboat. She was on a voyage from Sunderland to Stonehaven, Aberdeenshire.
Demetrius, and Trojan	United Kingdom	The steamship Trojan collided with the steamship Demetrius and was beached at Seacombe, Cheshire. She was on a voyage from Patras, Greece to Liverpool, Lancashire. She was refloated on 25 October and beached at Tranmere, Cheshire Demetrius was on a voyage from Alexandria, Egypt to Liverpool. She was taken in to Liverpool for repairs.
Eagle	United Kingdom	The ship sank off the Tongue Sand. Her crew were rescued. She was on a voyage from Looe, Cornwall to Gravesend, Kent.
Frances	United Kingdom	The brig sank off the Galloper Sandbank. Her crew were rescued by the steamship Henry Morton (United Kingdom). Frances was on a voyage from Seaham, County Durham to Le Tréport, Seine-Inférieure, France.
Ganges	United Kingdom	The steamship ran aground on the Haisborough Sands, in the North Sea off the coast of Norfolk. She was on a voyage from South Shields, County Durham to Alexandria, Egypt. She was refloated the next day with the assistance of a number of fishing smacks and tugs and taken in to Great Yarmouth, Norfolk in a leaky condition.
Malta	United Kingdom	The brig was abandoned off Happisburgh, Norfolk. Her crew were rescued by a fishing lugger. She subsequently came ashore at Happisburgh. Malta was later run into and broke up.
Maria Sophia	United Kingdom	The ship foundered in Morecambe Bay with the loss of all twelve crew. She was on a voyage from Saint Petersburg, Russia to Liverpool.
Ocean Belle	United Kingdom	The ship was abandoned in the Atlantic Ocean. Her crew were rescued by Aurora (United Kingdom). Ocean Belle was on a voyage from Quebec City, Canada to Cardiff, Glamorgan.
Speedwell	United Kingdom	The schooner was run down and sunk by the steamship James Strachan (United Kingdom) with the loss of two of her crew. Survivors were rescued by James Strachan.
Vulcan	Norway	The brig was driven ashore and wrecked at Johnshaven with the loss of thee of her eight crew. Survivors were rescued by rocket apparatus. She was on a voyage from Sunderland to Aberdeen.
William	United Kingdom	The schooner was driven ashore at Cairnryan, Wigtownshire. She was refloated on 4 November and taken in to Stranraer, Wigtownshire.
Unnamed	United Kingdom	The sloop sank at the mouth of the River Trent. Her crew survived.

== 25 October ==
List of shipwrecks: 25 October 1868
Ship	State	Description
Active	United Kingdom	The ship ran aground on the Lunner Platte, in the North Sea.
A. H. Chitton	United States	The barque was destroyed by fire off Cleveland, Ohio. Her crew were rescued. She was on a voyage from Cleveland to Liverpool, Lancashire, United Kingdom.
Colgrain	United Kingdom	The ship was sighted in the Atlantic Ocean whilst on a voyage from London to Galle, Ceylon. No further trace, presumed foundered with the loss of all hands.
Croxdale	United Kingdom	The brig foundered in the North Sea with the loss of all hands. She was on a voyage from the River Tyne to Hamburg.
Eclat	United Kingdom	The ship ran aground off Bembridge, Isle of Wight. She was on a voyage from Liverpool to Rotterdam, South Holland, Netherlands. She was refloated on 27 October and taken in to Portsmouth, Hampshire.
Gesser	flag unknown	The ship ran aground on the Lunner Platte.
Jane	United Kingdom	The schooner foundered off the mouth of the Humber. Her crew were rescued by the brig George Andrews (United Kingdom).
John Roberts	United Kingdom	The ship ran aground, capsized and sank at Waren Mill, Northumberland. She was on a voyage from Newton, Northumberland to Glasgow, Renfrewshire. She was refloated the next day and taken in to Berwick upon Tweed, Northumberland.
Lord Hartington	United Kingdom	The brigantine was destroyed by fire at Hunter's Point, New York City, United States with the loss of three of her crew. She was on a voyage from New York City to Queenstown, County Cork.
Princess	United Kingdom	The ship was driven ashore near Wremen, Prussia She was on a voyage from Brement to Hartlepool, County Durham.
Prosper	United Kingdom	The ship was wrecked at Audierne, Finistère, France. She was on a voyage from Gallipoli, Ottoman Empire to Hull, Yorkshire.
Rogate	United Kingdom	The schooner ran aground between Glückstadt, Prussia and "the Stor". She was refloated on 6 November with the assistance of two steamships and towed in to Glückstadt.
Spitfire	United Kingdom	The ship was driven ashore near Imsum, Prussia. She was on a voyage from Bremen to London.
Trave	Flag unknown	The brig was driven ashore near Wremen. She was on a voyage from Bremen to Grangemouth, Stirlingshire, United Kingdom.
Warwick	United Kingdom	The ship ran aground on the Nordergrunde, in the North Sea and was wrecked. She was on a voyage from Newcastle upon Tyne, Northumberland to Hamburg.
William	United Kingdom	The ship caught fire at Dartmouth, Devon and was scuttled with assistance from HMS Britannia and HMS Enchantress (both Royal Navy).
Unnamed	United Kingdom	The collier, a brig, was driven ashore near Wremen.

== 26 October ==
List of shipwrecks: 26 October 1868
Ship	State	Description
Arrow	United Kingdom	The ship ran aground on the Luner Platte, in the North Sea. She was on a voyage from Bremen to South Shields, County Durham. She was refloated on 3 November and taken in to the Geeste.
Blackness	United Kingdom	The brig was abandoned in the North Sea. Her crew were rescued. She was on a voyage from Sunderland, County Durham to the Nieuwe Diep.
Donor	United Kingdom	The collier ran aground on the Zuidwal, in the Wadden Sea.
Empress	United Kingdom	The hulk was driven ashore at Pwllcrochan, Pembrokeshire and became hogged.
Norma	United Kingdom	The barque was driven ashore at "Larche", Denmark. She was on a voyage from London to Memel, Prussia.
Pilote	France	The schooner ran aground on the Goodwin Sands, Kent, United Kingdom. She was on a voyage from Nantes, Loire-Inférieure to Hull, Yorkshire, United Kingdom. She was refloated and taken in to Ostend, West Flanders, Belgium in a severely leaky condition and was placed under repair.
Sovereign	India	The ship struck rocks at "Kwing Island", China. She was on a voyage from Shanghai, China to London. She was refloated and taken in to Foo Chow Foo, China for repairs.
Speedwell	United Kingdom	The sloop sprang a leak and foundered in the Irish Sea 2 nautical miles (3.7 km) north east of Great Orme Head, Caernarfonshire. Her crew were rescued by the steamship Prince of Wales (United Kingdom). Speedwell was on a voyage from Port Dinorwic, Caernarfonshire to Runcorn, Cheshire.
Unnamed	United States	The ship was driven ashore near Southport, Lancashire, United Kingdom.

== 27 October ==
List of shipwrecks: 27 October 1868
Ship	State	Description
Bismarck	Prussia	The ship was wrecked at "Tennyama".
Borderer	United Kingdom	The ship struck a sunken rock off Cape Agulhas, Cape Colony and foundered. Eight of her crew reached land, the boat with the other twelve crew was discovered in a capsized condition. She was on a voyage from Penang, Straits Settlements to London.
Constantia	United Kingdom	The schooner was driven ashore and wrecked on Düne, Heligoland with the loss of a crew member. She was on a voyage from Berwick upon Tweed, Northumberland to Hamburg.
Crest	(United Kingdom of Great Britain and Ireland) New Zealand	The ketch was wrecked near the mouth of Akaroa Harbour when it struck rocks, with the loss of two lives.
Forest Queen	United Kingdom	The ship departed from South Shields, County Durham for Guadeloupe. No further trace, presumed foundered with the loss of all hans.
Franklin	United Kingdom	The ship was wrecked at Cairnryan, Wigtownshire.
Jane	United Kingdom	The ship foundered off the Outer Dowsing Sandbank, in the North Sea off the coast of Norfolk. She was on a voyage from London to Newcastle upon Tyne, Northumberland.
John and Ann	United Kingdom	The ship was wrecked at Lemvig, Norway with the loss of her captain. She was on a voyage from Riga, Russia to Antwerp, Belgium.
Nordpolen	Norway	The ship was towed in to Ulvesund in a waterlogged condition. She was on a voyage from a Baltic port to Liverpool, Lancashire, United Kingdom.
Prosper	United Kingdom	The ship was driven ashore on Heligoland.
No. 11	Heligoland	The fishing sloop was driven ashore on Düne.
Two unnamed vessels	Netherlands	The ships were driven ashore on Düne. One of them was wrecked.

== 28 October ==
List of shipwrecks: 28 October 1868
Ship	State	Description
Alexander	Hamburg	The schooner departed from the Rio Grande do Sul for a British port. No further trace, presumed foundered with the loss of all hands.
Ellen and Mary	United Kingdom	The schooner was scuttled at Garlieston, Wigtownshire. She was on a voyage from Workington, Cumberland to the Isle of Whithorn, Wigtownshire.
Robert Anderson	United Kingdom	The brigantine ran aground on the Blacktail Sand, in the Thames Estuary.
Unnamed	United Kingdom	The Mersey Flat was wrecked on the West Hoyle Bank, in Liverpool Bay with the loss of all hands.

== 29 October ==
List of shipwrecks: 29 October 1868
Ship	State	Description
Champion	United Kingdom	The schooner was driven ashore on Walney Island, Lancashire. Her crew were rescued.
John	United Kingdom	The ship was driven ashore on the Dutch coast in a wrecked condition.
Malvern	United Kingdom	The ship, which had caught fire on 25 October, was abandoned off Sea Lion Island, Falkland Islands. Her crew survived. She was on a voyage from Liverpool, Lancashire to Valparaíso, Chile.
Newton	United Kingdom	The ship ran aground near Porthcawl, Glamorgan. She was refloated on 2 November and towed to Appledore, Devon for repairs.
Unnamed	Flag unknown	The brig sank off the Hugo Bank, in the Bristol Channel.

== 30 October ==
List of shipwrecks: 30 October 1868
Ship	State	Description
RMS Grecian	United Kingdom	The steamship struck a rock and sank in the Saint Lawrence River. Her passengers were rescued.
Karsinde	United Kingdom	The ship was driven ashore. She was on a voyage from Lowestoft, Suffolk to Groningen, Netherlands.
Primus	Sweden	The barque was sighted off Fortress Monroe, Virginia, United States whilst on a voyage from Baltimore, Maryland, United States to London, United Kingdom. No further trace, presumed foundered with the loss of all hands.
Tempest	United Kingdom	The ship departed from New York for London. No further trace, presumed foundered with the loss of all hands.
Theodorus	United Kingdom	The ship ran aground on the Salthouse Bank, in the Irish Sea off the coast of Lancashire. Her fifteen crew were rescued by the Blackpool and Lytham Lifeboats. She was on a voyage from Liverpool, Lancashire to Edina, Liberia. She was refloated and taken in to Lytham St. Annes, Lancashire.
Unnamed	Flag unknown	The schooner foundered off Ameland, Friesland, Netherlands with the loss of all hands.
Unnamed	Flag unknown	The schooner foundered off Amrum, Prussia with the loss of all hands.

== 31 October ==
List of shipwrecks: 31 October 1868
Ship	State	Description
Ariadne	United Kingdom	The schooner was run down and sunk in the North Sea 6 nautical miles (11 km) south of Scarborough, Yorkshire by a French lugger. Her four crew survived.
Bonita	(United Kingdom of Great Britain and Ireland) Jersey	The ship foundered in the English Channel 10 nautical miles (19 km) off the coast of Devon with the loss of her captain. The two survivors were each rescued by a fishing trawler.
Florence	United Kingdom	The steamship ran aground at "Eitzenloch". She was on a voyage from Leith, Lothian to Cuxhaven. She was refloated and completed her voyage.
Jura	United Kingdom	The schooner departed from South Shields, County Durham for Dublin. No further trace, presumed foundered with the loss of all hands.
Lion	United Kingdom	The steamship struck a sunken wreck and foundered off Dagerort, Russia. All on board were rescued. She was on a voyage from Hull, Yorkshire to Kronstadt, Russia.
HMS Pallas	Royal Navy	The ironclad caught fire off Gibraltar. Seventeen crew were injured. The fire was extinguished with assistance from a United States Navy warship.
Paraguay	United Kingdom	The steamship was driven ashore on Amrum, Friesland, Netherlands. She was refloated and found to be leaky.
Persia	United Kingdom	The ship was destroyed by fire at sea. Her crew were rescued by Black Watch (United Kingdom). Persia was on a voyage from Greenock, Renfrewshire to Bombay, India.
St. Helier	United Kingdom	The brig was wrecked at Wyk auf Föhr, Prussia. She was on a voyage from Lagos, Africa to Hamburg.
T. F. Gates	United Kingdom	The ship was wrecked on the Dutch coast. She was on a voyage from Galaţi, Ottoman Empire to Amsterdam, North Holland, Netherlands.

== Unknown date ==
List of shipwrecks: Unknown date in October 1868
Ship	State	Description
Daniel	Italy	The ship was wrecked on the coast of Brazil.
Enterprise	United Kingdom	The ship sank near Fort Mahon, Mallorca, Spain. She was on a voyage from Livorno, Italy to a port in Dorset.
Falcon	Flag unknown	The ship was destroyed by fire at Swatow, China before 27 October.
Fritz and Betsey	Flag unknown	The ship was driven ashore on the coast of Sweden.
Helena	France	The steamship was destroyed by fire off Capbreton, Landes.
Neptunus	Rostock	The ship was driven ashore on Læsø, Denmark. She was on a voyage from Bergen, Norway to Rostock. She had been refloated by 8 October and taken in to Fredrikshavn, Denmark in a severely leaky condition.
Prince Consort	United Kingdom	The ship was driven ashore and wrecked near Visby, Sweden.
Protector	United Kingdom	The ship departed from Hull, Yorkshire for Saint John, New Brunswick, Canada. No further trace, presumed foundered with the loss of all 25 crew.
R. Hines	Canada	The schooner was abandoned in the Atlantic Ocean before 12 October.
Sulina	United Kingdom	The ship foundered in Dingle Bay after 2 October with the loss of all hands. She was on a voyage from Falmouth, Cornwall for Dingle, County Kerry.
Souvenir	United Kingdom	The galeas was abandoned in the North Sea (54°50′N 4°05′E) on or before 5 October. She was on a voyage from Burntisland, Fife to the Elbe.
Spes	United Kingdom	The ship was lost off "Platorf".
Stag	United Kingdom	The ship was destroyed by fire at Bombay, India.
Stockton	United Kingdom	The ship was driven ashore in Boston Bay.
Vesta	United Kingdom	The schooner was driven ashore on Saaremaa, Russia. She was on a voyage from Hartlepool, County Durham to Saint Petersburg, Russia. She was refloated on 12 October and taken in to "Hafen Attel".
Virgen de Solidad	Spain	The ship was wrecked on the English Bank, in the River Plate. She was on a voyage from Barcelona to Montevideo, Uruguay.
