= Arreaga =

Arreaga is a surname. Notable people with the surname include:

- Brandon Arreaga (born 1999), American singer
- Luis Arreaga (born 1952), Guatemalan diplomat and government official
