= Jill Esposito =

American diplomat

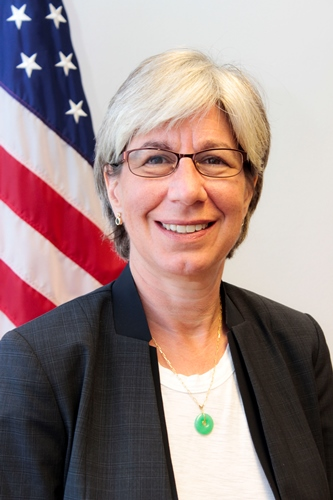
Jill M. Esposito

Jill Esposito is an American diplomat who was Chargé d’Affaires of the U.S. Embassy in Iceland from 2017 to 2019. Esposito had previously served as “Consul General at the U.S. Embassy in Baghdad, with responsibility for coordinating consular affairs throughout the three U.S. Posts operating in Iraq.”
