= James I. Gadsden =

American diplomat (born 1948)

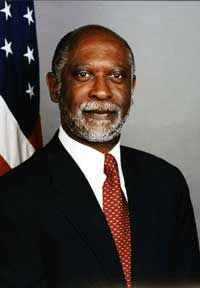

United States Ambassador to Iceland
- In office December 9, 2002 – July 14, 2005
- President: George W. Bush
- Preceded by: Barbara J. Griffiths
- Succeeded by: Carol van Voorst

Personal details
- Born: March 12, 1948 (age 78) Charleston, South Carolina
- Spouse: Sally Freeman Gadsden
- Children: 2
- Education: Harvard University; Stanford University; Princeton University
- Profession: Diplomat

James Irvin Gadsden (born March 12, 1948) is an American former diplomat who served as U.S. Ambassador to Iceland.

Gadsden graduated from Harvard University (1970, cum laude) with a B.A. in Economics, MA in East Asian Studies, from Stanford University (1972), and Princeton University (1984) with a Scholar in Economics.

He entered the Foreign Service in 1972 and became a career member of the Senior Foreign Service. After serving in various roles, he finished his career as a Senior Counselor for International Affairs at the Woodrow Wilson National Fellowship Foundation, serving from 2011 to 2016.

== Posts ==
- U.S. Ambassador to Iceland (2002–2005)
- Special Negotiator for Agricultural Biotechnology (2001–2002)
- Deputy Assistant Secretary for European Affairs (1997–2001)
- Deputy Chief of Mission, Budapest, Hungary (1994–1997)
- Counselor for Economic Affairs, Paris, France (1989–1993)
- Economic/Political Officer, US Mission to the EU (1985–1989)
- European Communities Desk Officer (1981–1984)
- Staff Assistant to Assistant Secretary for Economic and Business Affairs (1980–1981)
- Commercial Officer, Budapest, Hungary (1977–1979)
- Market Research Officer, US Trade Center, Taipei, Taiwan (1974–1976)
- Political Officer, Office of East Asian Regional Affairs (1972–1974)

Diplomatic posts
Preceded by Barbara J. Griffiths	United States Ambassador to Iceland; 2002–2005	Succeeded by Carol van Voorst
