= Barbara J. Griffiths =

American ambassador to Iceland (born 1949)

United States Ambassador to Iceland
- In office September 10, 1999 – October 23, 2002
- Preceded by: Day O. Mount
- Succeeded by: James I. Gadsden

Personal details
- Born: August 1, 1949 (age 77) Verona, New Jersey, U.S.
- Parent(s): Arthur Griffiths; Gloria Griffiths
- Education: Verona High School; Montclair State College (BA); University of Connecticut (MA)
- Profession: Diplomat

Barbara J. Griffiths (born August 1, 1949) was the US Ambassador to Iceland from September 10, 1999 to 2002.

Griffiths was born on August 1, 1949, and is a native of Verona, New Jersey, where she graduated from Verona High School. She received a B.A. degree in economics from Montclair State College in New Jersey, and an M.A. degree in economics from the University of Connecticut. She has studied French, Russian, German, Spanish, and Icelandic.

Griffiths began her career in the U.S. Foreign Service in 1977. From 1996 to 1999 she was Deputy Assistant Secretary of State for Economic and Business Affairs at the Department of State in Washington, D.C. Prior to that she was Minister Counselor for Economic Affairs at the U.S. Embassies in Seoul and Moscow. She held previous assignments in Washington, Mexico City and Ottawa.
