= Robert C. Barber =

American attorney

Robert Barber
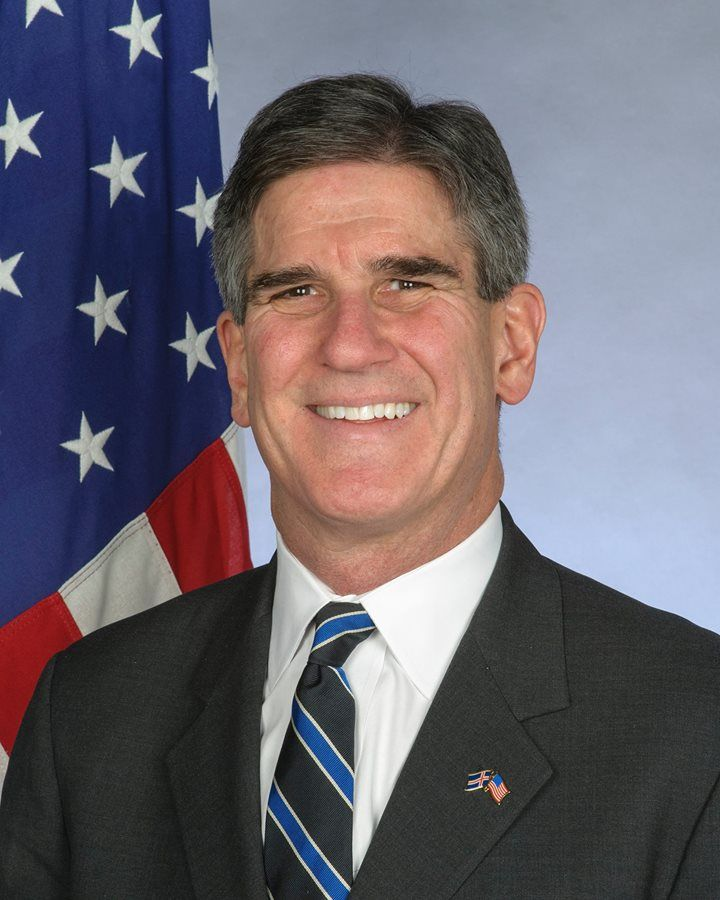

United States Ambassador to Iceland
- In office January 28, 2015 – January 20, 2017
- President: Barack Obama
- Preceded by: Luis E. Arreaga
- Succeeded by: Jeffrey Ross Gunter

Personal details
- Born: 1950 (age 75–76) Columbus, Georgia, U.S.
- Education: Harvard University (AB, MA); Boston University (JD)

Robert C. Barber is an American attorney and diplomat who served as United States Ambassador to Iceland in the Obama administration.

== Early life and education ==
Barber was born in Columbus, Georgia in 1950 and raised in Charleston, South Carolina. After attending Phillips Academy, he earned an A.B. in social studies from Harvard College in 1972, a Juris Doctor from the Boston University School of Law in 1977, and a master's degree in city and regional planning from the Harvard Graduate School of Design in 1977.

== Career ==
After graduating from law school, Barber served as an assistant district attorney for New York County from 1977 to 1981. In 1981, Barber joined the Boston-based law firm of Looney & Grossman, becoming a partner in 1985 and serving as managing partner from 2001 to 2003. His law practice focused on start-up companies and commercial litigation. During the 2008 United States presidential election, Barber was a fundraiser and frequent donor to the Barack Obama 2008 presidential campaign. Barber was a member of the Obama for America National Finance Committee.

Barber was nominated to serve as U.S. Ambassador to Iceland on October 30, 2013, succeeding career United States Foreign Service officer, Luis E. Arreaga. After a delay, Barber was confirmed on December 12, 2014 and presented his credentials to the president of Iceland, Ólafur Ragnar Grímsson on January 28, 2015. Barber served as ambassador until the inauguration of Donald Trump. He was succeeded by Jeffrey Ross Gunter. Barber resumed his legal career in 2017 and joined Prince Lobel as a corporate attorney.
