= Carol van Voorst =

American diplomat

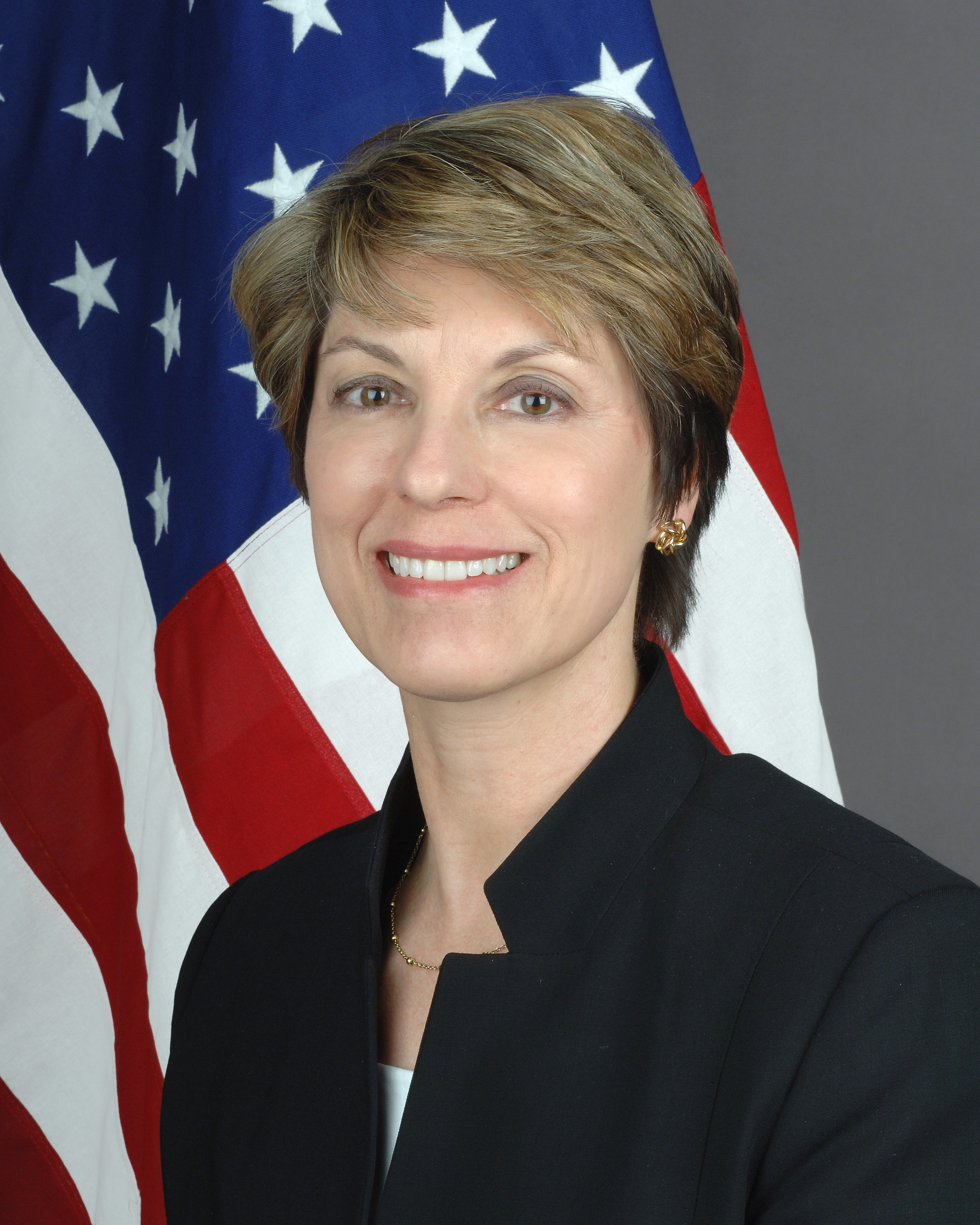

United States Ambassador to Iceland
- In office 2006–2009
- President: George W. Bush
- Preceded by: James Irvin Gadsden
- Succeeded by: Luis E. Arreaga

Personal details
- Born: Carol Lee van Voorst; 1952 (age 73–74) Holland, Michigan
- Education: Hope College; Princeton University; National War College

Carol Lee van Voorst (born 1952) is an American diplomat who served as the former United States Ambassador to Iceland. She was confirmed by the U.S. Senate on November 18, 2005, after being nominated by President George W. Bush on October 28, 2005. Her mission was terminated on January 20, 2009.

== Early life ==
Van Voorst was born in Holland, Michigan. She attended Hope College, where she received her B.A. She also has an M.A. and a Ph.D. in history from Princeton University, and an M.A. in international security policy from the National War College. Her 1978 Ph.D. thesis was entitled The Anglican clergy in Maryland, 1692-1776, and was published as one of the Outstanding Studies in Early American History. She is married to William Garland.

== Career ==
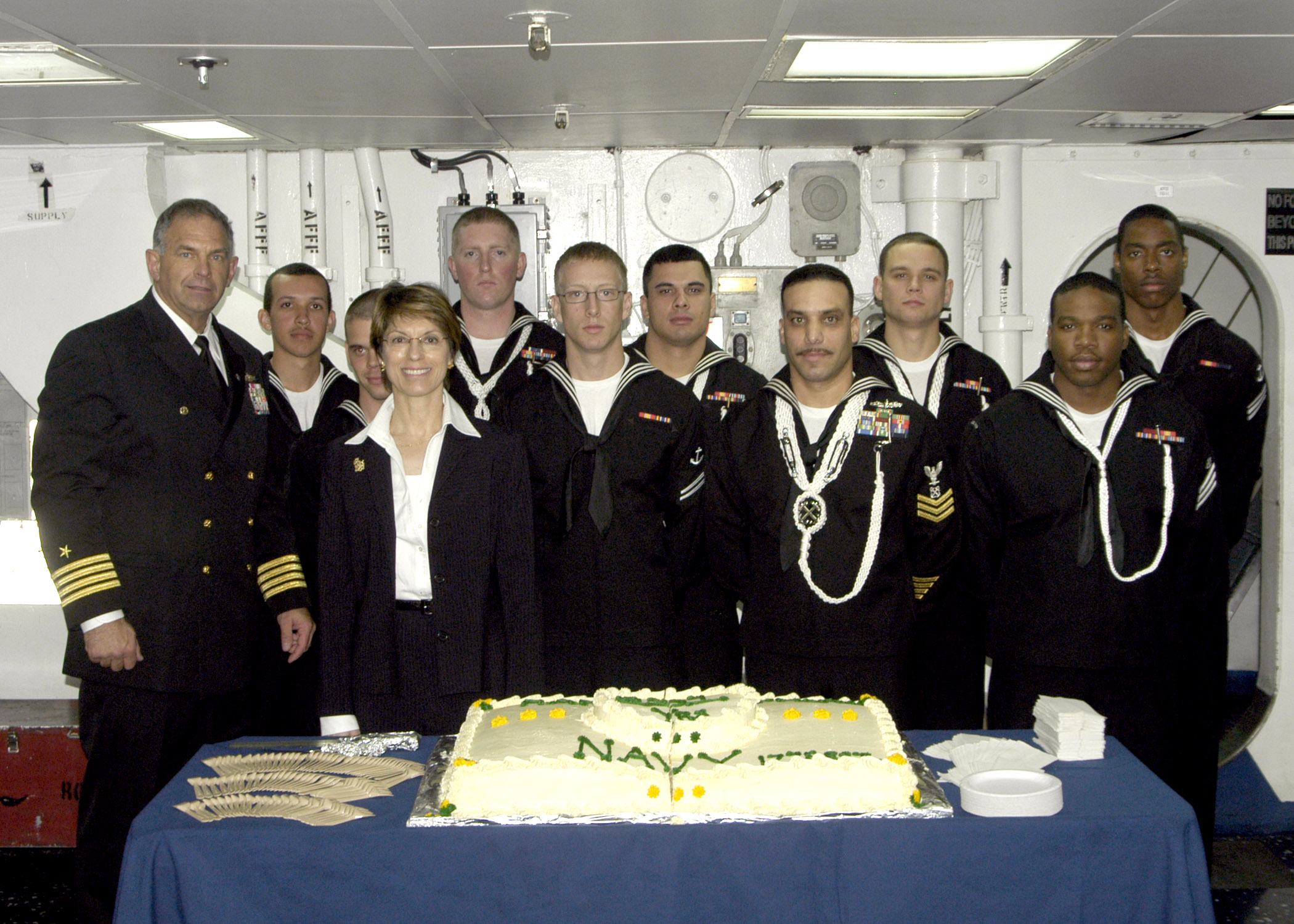
Van Voorst and sailors stand in front of a cake for the U.S. Navy's 231st birthday.

Before she joined the Foreign Service, van Voorst was an American history teacher at the City University of New York. She was also a congressional aide for the Helsinki Commission.

In 1980, van Voorst joined the Foreign Service. She then served as an Embassy Officer to the Netherlands. From 1999 to 2002, she served as Deputy Chief of Mission of the U.S. Embassy in Helsinki, Finland after previously serving as the Deputy High Representative in Sarajevo, Bosnia. She also served as the Director of the Office of Nordic and Baltic Affairs from 1995 to 1997, and as the Director of Austrian, German, and Swiss Affairs, from 2002 to 2004.

=== U.S. Ambassador to Iceland ===
Van Voorst was sworn in as the United States Ambassador to Iceland on January 3, 2006. She presented her credentials to President Ólafur Ragnar Grímsson of Iceland on January 26, 2006. While she was Ambassador, the United States, which had provided Iceland with its only military force since 1951, announced that it would withdraw most of its service members and all of its fighter jets and helicopters. Ambassador van Voorst successfully negotiated the closure of the American airbase at Keflavik and a follow-on mutual defense agreement with the Icelandic government. Her mission was terminated on April 30, 2009. Upon her leaving, President Grímsson's office mistakenly announced that she would be honored with the Order of the Falcon. Reportedly, Grímsson apologized to Ambassador van Voorst and "explained to her that only those who were deemed worthy were honored this way." Ambassador van Voorst had just previously received the Department of State's Distinguished Honor Award in recognition of her outstanding performance as Ambassador to Iceland.

In July 2009 she was appointed deputy commandant for international affairs at the Army War College.

Diplomatic posts
Preceded by James Irvin Gadsden	United States Ambassador to Iceland; 2006–2009	Succeeded by Luis E. Arreaga
