= Charles E. Cobb =

American businessman

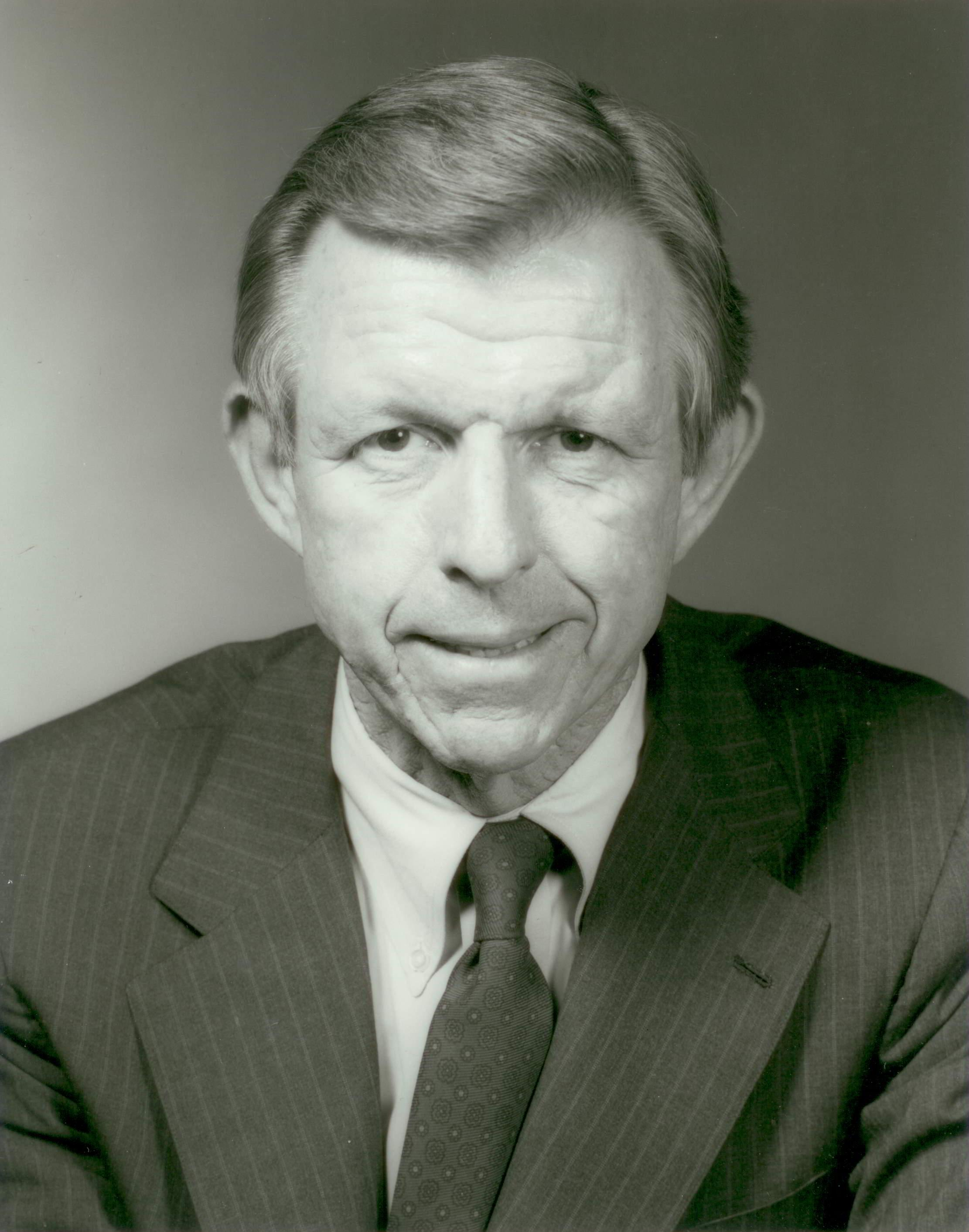
Cobb in 2013

Charles Elvan Cobb, Jr. (born May 9, 1936) is an American businessman. He is currently the chief executive officer and senior managing director of Cobb Partners, Ltd., an investment firm. He was the chairman and chief executive officer of Arvida Corporation and Disney Development Company during the 1970s and 1980s. Arvida was a public company and then a subsidiary of Penn Central Transportation Company and later of The Walt Disney Company.

He has also served as a member of the Walt Disney board of directors and the executive committee of the Disney board. Prior to this, he was the chief operating officer and a director of Penn Central Transportation Corporation, a multi-industry company that had approximately 40,000 employees. He led a leveraged buy-out of Arvida Corporation from Penn Central with the Bass family in Texas and subsequently merged Arvida with Walt Disney. Earlier, he was an investment manager with Dodge & Cox and the chief executive officer of subsidiaries at Kaiser Aluminum.

== Career ==
Cobb was the United States Ambassador to Iceland during the George H. W. Bush administration. Cobb received the Order of the Falcon from the Iceland (Iceland’s highest honor to a non-Icelandic citizen). During the Reagan Administration, he served as under secretary and assistant secretary at the United States Department of Commerce. In the 1950s he served as an officer in the United States Navy. Florida Governors, Jeb Bush and Charlie Crist, appointed Cobb as chairman of Florida FTAA and Gateway Florida, which have the responsibility for Florida’s international trade agenda. Cobb created the Charles E. Cobb Jr. Award for Initiative and Success in Trade Development within the U.S. Department of State that is awarded annually to the career ambassador who best leads U.S. trade policy.

== Community development career ==
In his 40 years as the CEO of Arvida Corporation, Disney Development, Kaiser Community Development, and Cobb Partners, Cobb has had the responsibility for the development of more than 30 new towns and master-planned communities. Notably, he oversaw the development of Weston, Florida, where in 1978 he directed a strategic reduction in the project’s density—from 25,000 to 17,000 units—to ensure long-term property value and quality of life. This planning laid the groundwork for Weston’s reputation for safety, its AAA credit rating, and its efficient contract-based municipal management.

== Education involvement ==
Cobb was educated at Stanford University where he received his BA and MBA. He is the past chairman of the Board of Trustees of the University of Miami, having been the chairman, vice chairman or past chairman of the trustees for over 35 years. He is a former trustee of the Stanford Business School Trust Fund, a member of the Advisory Council for the Stanford Business School, and the past president of two Stanford alumni organizations. He was the chairman of the Board of the Florida Business/Higher Education Partnership, the co-founder and trustee of the Barry University Charter School, a director of the South Florida Annenberg Challenge, a director of the Council for Educational Change and a former member of the Florida Governor’s Commission on Education.

== Directorships and civic affairs ==
Cobb has served on the Boards of nine publicly traded corporations (Arvida, Penn Central, Walt Disney, LNR Property Corporation, WCI Communities, Ameritas, Pan Am Corporation, CLC of America, and Southeast Banking) and many private corporate boards (Florida Savings, Kirkwood Mountain Resort, Durango Mountain Resort, Telluride Resort, Tubac Resort, and Observer Media Group). Cobb has been an officer and/or member of the Executive Committee of The Florida Council of 100 (Chairman 2000–2002), Florida Chamber of Commerce, the South Florida Coordinating Council, the Greater Miami Chamber of Commerce and several other economic development organizations. Cobb also serves on the Board and the Investment Committee for the Florida State Board of Administration, University of Miami, Woodrow Wilson International Center for Scholars, Eisenhower Fellowships, Orange Bowl Committee, Council of American Ambassadors and Cobb Family Foundation. He was the co-chairman of the committee that secured $9 billion of federal funds for South Florida after Hurricane Andrew. Other civic boards and memberships include Plymouth Congregational Church, The American-Scandinavian Foundation, the Icelandic-American Chamber of Commerce, Orange Bowl Committee, Council on Foreign Relations, the Urban Land Institute, and the Lincoln Institute of Land Policy.

Cobb was a member of the Non-Group, a civically influential group of Miami-Dade business elites.

== Personal life ==
Cobb has been married since 1959 to Sue M. Cobb, former U.S. Ambassador to Jamaica and Secretary of State of Florida. She is a lawyer, sportswoman, and author who chronicled her 1988 attempt to be the first American woman to reach the summit of Mount Everest with a book entitled The Edge of Everest. They have two sons, Christian (architect and Harvard MBA) and Tobin (investment banker and NYU MBA), and seven grandchildren.

Diplomatic posts
Preceded by L. Nicholas Ruwe	United States Ambassador to Iceland; 1989–1992	Succeeded by Sigmund Rogich
