= Carrin Patman =

American lawyer and diplomat

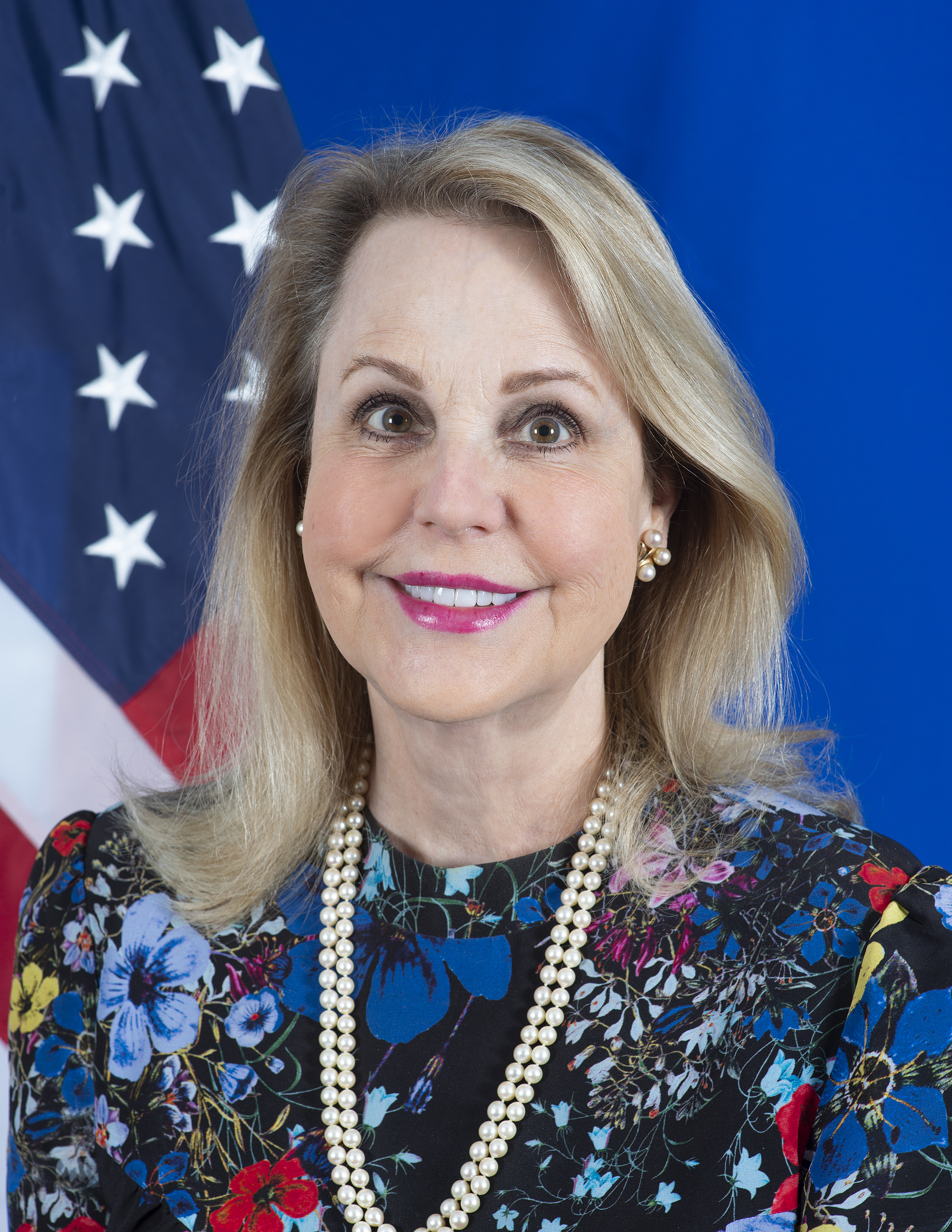
- Official portrait, 2022

United States Ambassador to Iceland
- In office October 6, 2022 – January 18, 2025
- President: Joe Biden
- Preceded by: Jeffrey Ross Gunter
- Succeeded by: Billy Long

Chair of Houston Metro
- In office 2016 – February 23, 2022
- Appointed by: Sylvester Turner
- Preceded by: Gilbert Garcia
- Succeeded by: Sanjay Ramabhadran

Personal details
- Born: Carrin Foreman Patman; April 20, 1956 (age 70)
- Spouse: James V. Derrick Jr. (m. 1997)
- Parent: Bill Patman (father)
- Relatives: Wright Patman (grandfather)
- Education: Duke University (BA); University of Texas (JD)

Carrin Foreman Patman (born April 20, 1956) is an American attorney who had served as United States ambassador to Iceland. She formerly served as the chair of Houston Metro from 2016 to 2022.

== Education ==
Patman earned a Bachelor of Arts from Duke University and a Juris Doctor from the University of Texas School of Law in 1982.

== Career ==
Patman has a distinguished record of civic engagement, which includes service as a member of the Houston Chapter of the International Women’s Forum, and on the boards of the Greater Houston Partnership and the Houston-Galveston Area Transportation Policy Council. Patman was also a Founding Board Member of The Center for Women in Law, as well as an executive committee member of Girls, Inc. of Greater Houston and Sheltering Arms Senior Services.

Patman is a partner at Bracewell LLP, where she specializes in class action litigation, commercial disputes, antitrust and competition issues, environmental violations, and regulatory compliance. She was a member of the board of Houston Metro from 2010 to 2022 and was appointed chair by Sylvester Turner in 2016. Patman was a major fundraiser to the Hillary Clinton 2016 presidential campaign and Joe Biden 2020 presidential campaign.

=== Ambassador to Iceland ===
On February 11, 2022, President Joe Biden nominated Patman to be the next United States ambassador to Iceland. Hearings on her nomination were held before the Senate Foreign Relations Committee on July 28, 2022. Her nomination was favorably reported on August 4, 2022. Patman was confirmed by the full Senate on August 7, 2022, by voice vote. She presented her credentials to President Guðni Th. Jóhannesson on October 6, 2022.

== Awards and recognitions ==
Patman has received multiple awards and was the first woman to receive the Karen H. Susman Jurisprudence Award, given by the Anti-Defamation League Southwest Region.

== Personal life ==
Patman's father, Bill Patman, served as a member of the Texas Senate and United States House of Representatives. Her paternal grandfather Wright Patman also served in the U.S. House, and her maternal grandfather Fred Mauritz was a Texas state senator.

In 1997, Carrin Patman married James V. Derrick Jr, former executive vice president and general counsel to Enron Corporation.

Diplomatic posts
Preceded by Jeffrey Ross Gunter	United States Ambassador to Iceland; 2022–2025	Succeeded by Billy Long
