= L. Nicholas Ruwe =

United States Ambassador to Iceland (1985–1989)

United States Ambassador to Iceland
- In office July 12, 1985 – October 7, 1989
- President: Ronald Reagan; George H. W. Bush
- Preceded by: Marshall Brement
- Succeeded by: Charles E. Cobb

Personal details
- Born: Lester Nicholas Ruwe; September 22, 1933 Detroit, Michigan, U.S.
- Died: May 2, 1990 (aged 56) Rochester, Minnesota, U.S.
- Party: Republican
- Education: Brown University; University of Michigan Business School

Lester Nicholas Ruwe (September 22, 1933 – May 2, 1990) was the United States Ambassador to Iceland from 1985 until 1989. (Note: "L. Nicholas Ruwe (1933–1990)". Office of the Historian. United States Department of State.)

Ruwe helped settle disputes involving shipping and whaling and was responsible for the operation of the 1986 summit meeting between President Ronald Reagan and Mikhail Gorbachev. He was chief of staff in New York for former President Richard M. Nixon (1980-1984), assistant chief of protocol at the State Department from 1969 to 1975, and was responsible for the state funerals of former Presidents Harry S. Truman and Dwight D. Eisenhower and for the world tour of Apollo 11 astronauts Neil Armstrong, Buzz Aldrin, and Michael Collins after their return from the Moon in 1969. (Note: "L. Nicholas Ruwe". Corpus Christi Caller-Times. Rochester, Minnesota. Associated Press. 1990-05-06. p. 35. Archived from the original on 2022-06-10 – via Newspapers.com.)

Ruwe graduated from Brown University in 1955 and the University of Michigan Graduate School of Business Administration in 1956.

He died of cancer at the Mayo Clinic.

Diplomatic posts
Preceded by Marshall Brement	Ambassador Extraordinary and Plenipotentiary of the United States to Iceland; 1985-07-12 – 1989-10-07	Next: Charles E. Cobb
Notes and references
1. "Chiefs of Mission for Iceland". Office of the Historian. United States Department of State. Archived from the original on 2022-05-22.
