= Luis E. Arreaga =

Guatemalan-American diplomat (born 1952)

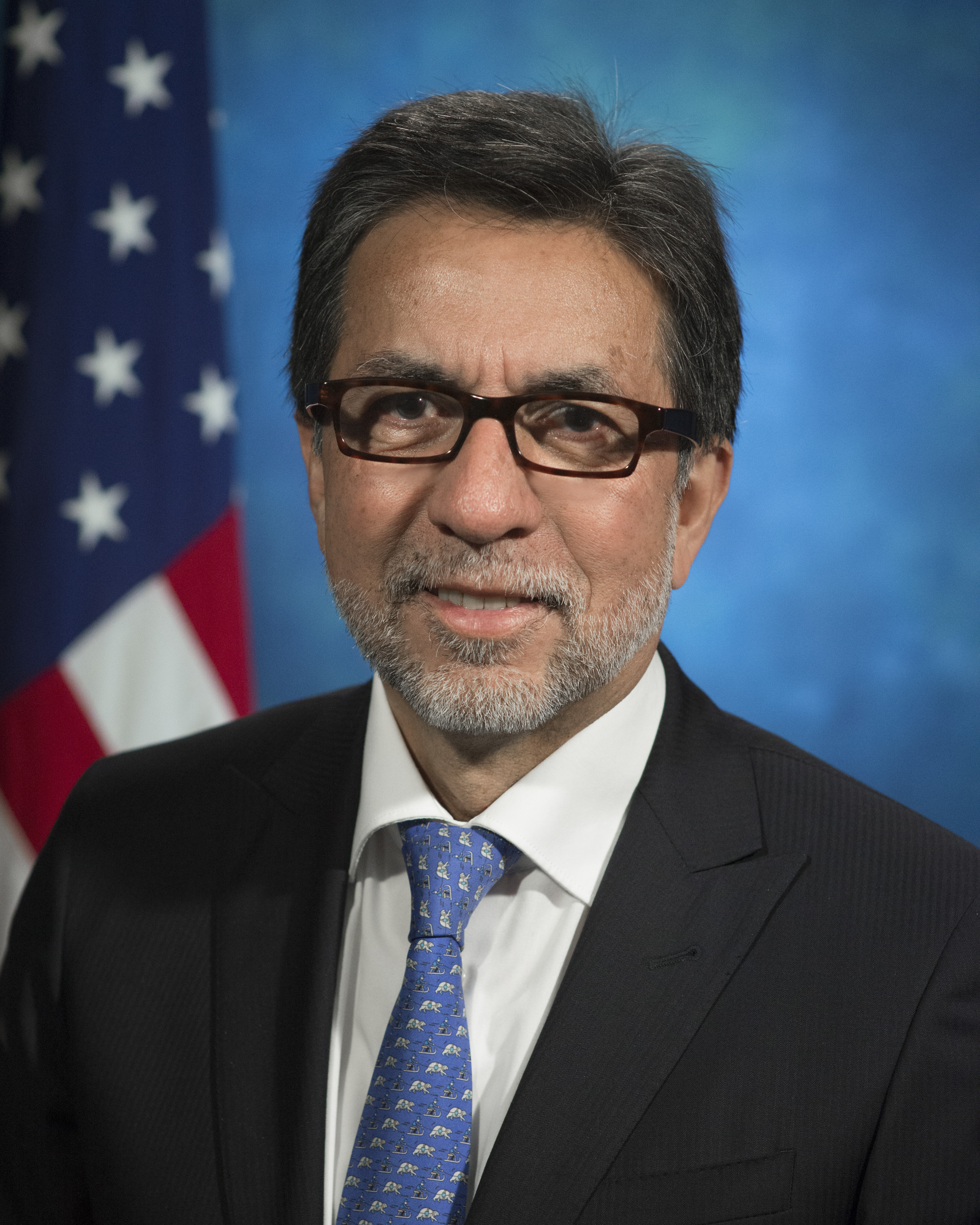

United States Ambassador to Guatemala
- In office October 3, 2017 – October 2, 2020
- President: Donald Trump
- Preceded by: Todd D. Robinson
- Succeeded by: William W. Popp

United States Ambassador to Iceland
- In office September 20, 2010 – November 23, 2013
- President: Barack Obama
- Preceded by: Carol van Voorst
- Succeeded by: Robert C. Barber

Personal details
- Born: 1952 (age 73–74) Guatemala
- Spouse: Mary F. Kelsey
- Children: 3
- Education: University of Wisconsin–Milwaukee
- Occupation: Ambassador

Luis Edmundo Arreaga-Rodas (born 1952) is a Guatemalan American diplomat and government official who served as the United States Ambassador to Guatemala from 2017 to 2020. He previously served as United States Ambassador to Iceland from 2010 to 2013. In January 2016, he was appointed Principal Deputy Assistant Secretary of State for the Bureau of International Narcotics and Law Enforcement Affairs. In June 2017, President Donald Trump nominated Arreaga to become the United States Ambassador to Guatemala. This nomination was confirmed by the U.S. Senate on August 3, 2017.

== Early life and education ==
Arreaga was born in Guatemala City in 1952 to a migrant worker and an elementary school teacher. At age 18, Arreaga immigrated to the US and began attending Milwaukee Area Technical College. Arreaga transferred to the University of Wisconsin-Milwaukee, where he earned a bachelor's degree in 1976 and a master's in management and a PhD in economics in 1981.

== Career ==
He previously served as Deputy Chief of Mission at the United States Embassy in Panama; U.S. Consul General in Vancouver, British Columbia, Canada; and as director of the Executive Secretariat Staff at the U.S. Department of State in Washington, D.C. He has also served as deputy director of the State Department's Operations Center and Special Assistant to the Under Secretary for Political Affairs. Other overseas postings include United States Mission to the United Nations in Geneva, the United States Embassy in Spain, and the Agency for International Development in Peru, El Salvador, and Honduras.

== Personal life ==
Arreaga married Mary Kelsey in 1973, whom he met during his time on the Milwaukee Area Technical College fencing team. Arreaga and Kelsey have a daughter, Melania, who served in the Foreign Service; and two sons: Juan Carlos and Luis.

He became a U.S. citizen in 1975.

Diplomatic posts
Preceded by Carol van Voorst	United States Ambassador to Iceland; 2010–2013	Succeeded by Robert C. Barber
Preceded by Todd D. Robinson; David Hodge (as Chargé d'Affaires)	United States Ambassador to Guatemala; 2017–2020	Succeeded by William W. Popp
