= List of ambassadors of the United States to Iceland =

Ambassador of the United States to Iceland
- Seal of the United States Department of State

- United States ambassador flag

- Incumbent; Billy Long since August 10, 2026
- Nominator: The president of the United States
- Appointer: The president; with Senate advice and consent
- Inaugural holder: Lincoln MacVeagh; as Envoy Extraordinary and Minister Plenipotentiary
- Formation: August 8, 1941
- Website: is.usembassy.gov

Until 1874, Iceland was a dependency of Denmark rather than an independent nation. In 1874, Denmark granted Iceland home rule, which again was expanded in 1904. In 1918, The Act of Union, an agreement between Denmark, recognized Iceland as a fully sovereign state united with Denmark under a common king. Iceland established its own flag and asked that Denmark represent its foreign affairs and defense interests; thus, the United States ambassador to Denmark conducted foreign relations between the United States and Iceland.

The German invasion and occupation of Denmark on April 9, 1940, severed communications between Iceland and Denmark. As a result, on April 10, the Parliament of Iceland elected to take control of their own foreign affairs. The United States thus commissioned Lincoln MacVeagh as its first ambassador to Iceland on August 8, 1941. MacVeagh presented his credentials to the foreign minister of Iceland on September 30, 1941. His title was Envoy Extraordinary and Minister Plenipotentiary. The US has maintained continuous diplomatic relations with Iceland since then.

Following a plebiscite, Iceland formally became an independent republic on June 17, 1944.

== List of ambassadors ==
#	Name	Title	Appointment	Presentation of credentials	Termination of mission	Nature of appointment	Nature of termination
1	Lincoln MacVeagh	Envoy Extraordinary and Minister Plenipotentiary	1941-08-08	1941-09-30	1942-06-27	Political appointee	Left post
2	Leland Burnette Morris	Envoy Extraordinary and Minister Plenipotentiary	1942-08-13	1942-10-07	1944-05-10	Career FSO	Relinquished charge
3	Louis Goethe Dreyfus, Jr.	Envoy Extraordinary and Minister Plenipotentiary	1944-03-21	1944-06-14	1946-10-21	Career FSO	Left post
4	Richard P. Butrick	Envoy Extraordinary and Minister Plenipotentiary	1948-02-26	1948-04-29	1949-08-10	Career FSO	Left post
5	Edward B. Lawson	Envoy Extraordinary and Minister Plenipotentiary	1949-07-22	1949-09-22	1954-05-29	Career FSO	Left post
6	John Joseph Muccio	Envoy Extraordinary and Minister Plenipotentiary	1954-08-23	1954-10-12	1955-10-19	Career FSO	Mission title changed
6	John Joseph Muccio	Ambassador Extraordinary and Plenipotentiary	1955-10-19	1955-11-03	1959-12-16	Career FSO	Left post
7	Tyler Thompson	Ambassador Extraordinary and Plenipotentiary	1960-01-27	1960-02-19	1961-04-16	Career FSO	Left post
8	James K. Penfield	Ambassador Extraordinary and Plenipotentiary	1961-04-27	1961-05-24	1967-03-16	Career FSO	Left post
9	Karl Fritjof Rolvaag	Ambassador Extraordinary and Plenipotentiary	1967-04-05	1967-05-09	1969-03-27	Political appointee	Left post
10	Luther I. Replogle	Ambassador Extraordinary and Plenipotentiary	1969-07-08	1969-09-12	1972-06-15	Political appointee	Left post
11	Frederick Irving	Ambassador Extraordinary and Plenipotentiary	1972-09-11	1972-10-11	1976-04-21	Career FSO	Left post
12	James J. Blake	Ambassador Extraordinary and Plenipotentiary	1976-07-01	1976-09-08	1978-09-29	Career FSO	Left post
13	Richard A. Ericson, Jr.	Ambassador Extraordinary and Plenipotentiary	1978-10-12	1978-11-21	1981-08-15	Career FSO	Left post
14	Marshall Brement	Ambassador Extraordinary and Plenipotentiary	1981-07-27	1981-09-16	1985-08-01	Career FSO	Left post
15	L. Nicholas Ruwe	Ambassador Extraordinary and Plenipotentiary	1985-07-12	1985-08-21	1989-10-07	Political appointee	Left post
16	Charles Elvan Cobb, Jr.	Ambassador Extraordinary and Plenipotentiary	1989-10-10	1989-11-08	1992-01-10	Political appointee	Left post
17	Sigmund Rogich	Ambassador Extraordinary and Plenipotentiary	1992-05-11	1992-06-04	1993-10-14	Political appointee	Left post
18	Parker W. Borg	Ambassador Extraordinary and Plenipotentiary	1993-10-08	1993-11-24	1996-07-13	Career FSO	Left post
19	Day O. Mount	Ambassador Extraordinary and Plenipotentiary	1996-06-11	1996-09-03	1999-08-12	Career FSO	Left post
20	Barbara J. Griffiths	Ambassador Extraordinary and Plenipotentiary	1999-08-09	1999-09-29	2002-07-29	Career FSO	Left post
21	James Irvin Gadsden	Ambassador Extraordinary and Plenipotentiary	2002-10-03	2002-12-09	2005-07-14	Career FSO	Left post
22	Carol van Voorst	Ambassador Extraordinary and Plenipotentiary	2006-01-03	2006-01-26	2009-04-30	Career FSO	Left post
23	Luis E. Arreaga	Ambassador Extraordinary and Plenipotentiary	2010-09-10	2010-09-20	2013-11-23	Career FSO	Left post
24	Robert C. Barber	Ambassador Extraordinary and Plenipotentiary	2015-01-02	2015-01-28	2017-01-20	Political appointee	Left post
25	Jeffrey Ross Gunter	Ambassador Extraordinary and Plenipotentiary	2019-05-23	2019-07-02	2021-01-20	Political appointee	Left post
26	Carrin Patman	Ambassador Extraordinary and Plenipotentiary	2022-08-07	2022-10-06	2025-01-18	Political appointee	Left post
27	Billy Long	Ambassador Extraordinary and Plenipotentiary	2026-05-18	2026-08-10	Present	Political appointee	

== See also ==
- Ambassadors of the United States
- Foreign relations of Iceland
- Iceland–United States relations
