= Marshall Brement =

American diplomat

United States Ambassador to Iceland
- In office July 27, 1981 – August 1, 1985
- Appointed by: Ronald Reagan

Personal details
- Born: January 10, 1932 New York City
- Died: April 6, 2009 (aged 77) Tucson, Arizona
- Education: Brooklyn College; University of Maryland

Marshall Brement (January 10, 1932 – April 6, 2009) was a career United States Foreign Service officer who served as United States Ambassador to Iceland in 1981–1985 and, after retirement, was a professor at the University of Virginia. (Note: "Marshall Brement Diplomat". Washington Post. 2009-04-09.)

== Early life and education ==
Brement was born on January 10, 1932, in New York City. He graduated from Brooklyn College with a Bachelor of Arts in 1952 and earned his Master of Arts at the University of Maryland in 1955. His foreign languages were Russian, Chinese (Mandarin and Cantonese), French, Spanish, Icelandic, and Indonesian. He was the first American Ambassador to publicly address the Icelandic people in their own language. Mr. Brement was married and had three children.

== Foreign Service career ==
Brement entered the Foreign Service in 1956 as staff assistant in the Bureau of East Asian and Pacific Affairs. He attended Chinese language training in Taichung in 1958–1960, and was political officer in Hong Kong in 1960–1963. In 1963–1964, he attended Russian language training at the Foreign Service Institute. He was political officer in Moscow in 1964–1966. He attended the National Institute of Public Affairs at Stanford University in 1966–1967. He was chief of the political section in Singapore (1967–1970), counselor for public affairs in Jakarta, Indonesia in 1970–1973, counselor for public affairs in Saigon (1973–1974), counselor for political affairs in Moscow (1974–1976), and in Madrid, Spain (1977–1979). He later served on the National Security Council as a Soviet adviser to President Jimmy Carter and was a deputy to U.S. Ambassador Jeane Kirkpatrick at the United Nations before being appointed ambassador in Reykjavík in 1981. (Note: "Nominations, July 8, 1981". Ronald Reagan Presidential Library. Archived from the original on 2022-06-10.)

After leaving Iceland, he spent four years at the United States Naval War College in Newport, Rhode Island, where he directed the Chief of Naval Operations Strategic Studies Group, an advisory think tank to the Chief of Naval Operations.

He served as distinguished visiting professor at the National Defense University and, from 1999 to 2002, he was an international affairs professor at the University of Virginia. He was fluent in French, Spanish, Hebrew, Russian, Chinese (Mandarin and Cantonese), Icelandic, and Indonesian.

== Published works ==
- ———— (1978). "Organizing ourselves to deal with the Soviets". RAND Corporation Papers (P-6123). Santa Monica, California: RAND Corporation. OL 22395468M.
- Steinarr, Steinn; Vör, Jón úr; Johannessen, Matthías (1985). Three Modern Icelandic Poets. Translated by ————. Reykjavík: Iceland Review. ASIN B000EHLDXC. OL 21963327M.
- Johannessen, Matthías (1988-12-28). The Naked Machine. Translated by ————. Almenna Bókafélagid. ISBN 978-0-9482-5944-9. OL 21918826M.
- ———— (1991). Reaching Out to Moscow: From Confrontation to Cooperation. Præger. ISBN 978-0-2759-4073-7. LCCN 91018920. OL 1540314M – via Internet Archive.
- Johannessen, Matthías (2004). New Journeys. Translated by Scudder, Bernard; Allard, Joe; ————. Reykjavík: Vaka-Helgafell. ISBN 978-9-9792-1790-9.
- ———— (2006-05-30). Day of the Dead. Moyer Bell. ISBN 978-1-5592-1387-5. LCCN 2005019491. OL 3404192M.

Diplomatic posts
Preceded by Richard A. Ericson, Jr.	Ambassador Extraordinary and Plenipotentiary of the United States to Iceland; 1981-07-27 – 1985-08-01	Next: L. Nicholas Ruwe
Notes and references
1. "Chiefs of Mission for Iceland". Office of the Historian. United States Department of State. Archived from the original on 2022-05-22.
