= Jeffrey Ross Gunter =

American physician and diplomat

Jeff Gunter
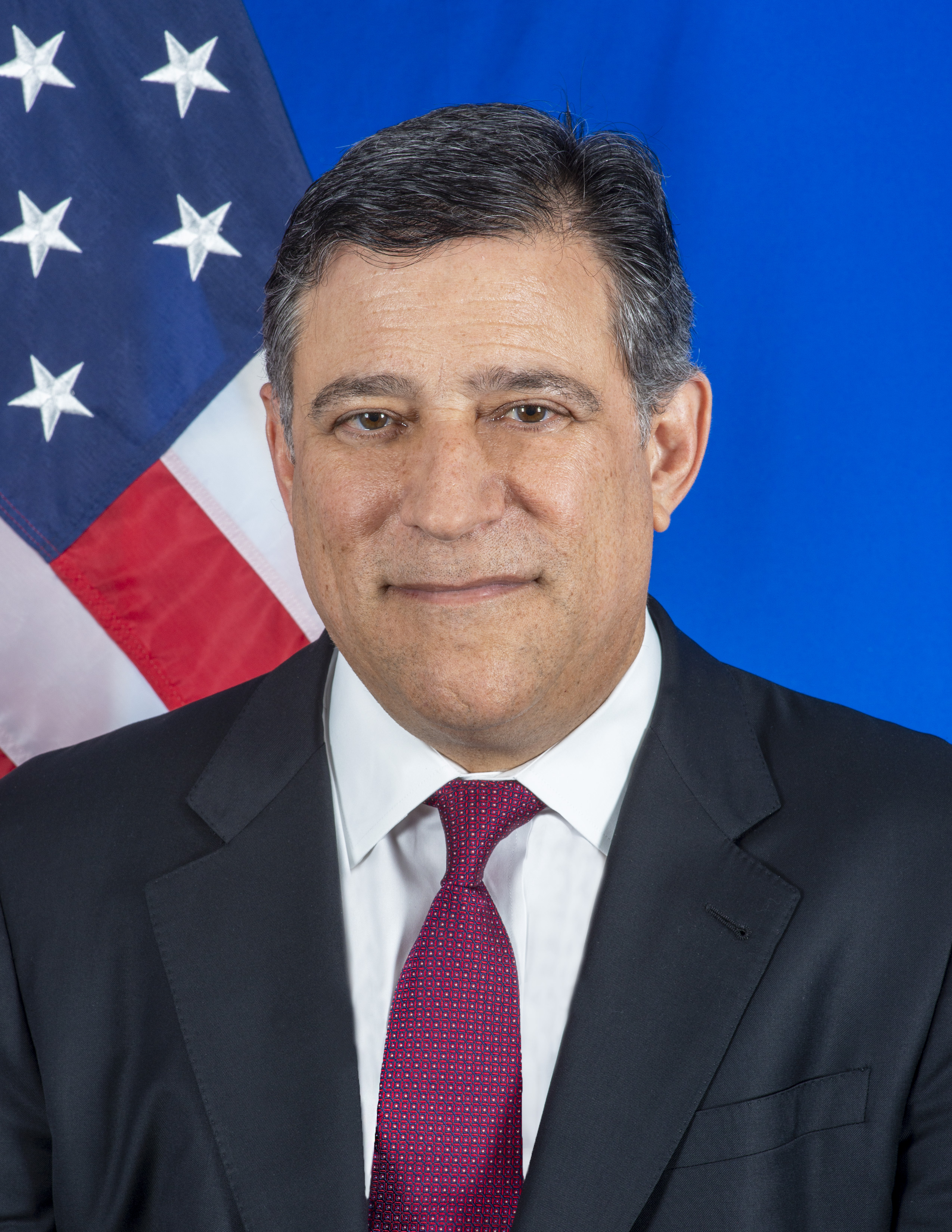
- Official portrait, 2019

United States Ambassador to Iceland
- In office July 2, 2019 – January 20, 2021
- President: Donald Trump
- Preceded by: Robert C. Barber
- Succeeded by: Carrin Patman

Personal details
- Born: January 31, 1961 (age 65)
- Party: Democratic (before 2021); Republican (2023–present)
- Education: University of California, Berkeley (BA); University of Southern California (MD)

Jeffrey Ross Gunter (born January 31, 1961) is an American dermatologist, healthcare executive, and diplomat who served as U.S. Ambassador to Iceland from 2019 to 2021. Gunter was a candidate for the Republican nomination for U.S. Senate from Nevada in the 2024 election, finishing second to Sam Brown. Gunter was then a candidate for the United States House of Representatives in 2026 in Nevada's 3rd congressional district. He placed third in the Republican primary, losing to Martin O'Donnell.

== Education ==
Gunter graduated from Beverly Hills High School. He received his Bachelor of Arts in psychology from the University of California, Berkeley, in 1983 and his Doctor of Medicine degree from the USC School of Medicine in 1987.

Gunter completed his residency in 1991 at the Los Angeles General Medical Center, where he served as the chief resident of dermatology.

== Medical career ==
In addition to practicing dermatology, Gunter served as a Clinical Professor of Medicine at the Keck School of Medicine of USC.

During his 2024 Senate campaign, NBC News reported that Gunter's medical practice had received a number of very negative reviews on customer feedback sites. Gunter was also named as a defendant in two medical malpractice lawsuits filed in California in the mid-2000s: both were settled. According to his campaign, neither case involved patients he personally treated.

== U.S. Ambassador to Iceland ==
=== Appointment ===
On August 21, 2018, Trump nominated Gunter to serve as U.S. Ambassador to Iceland. The Senate took no action on the nomination, which expired on January 3, 2019, at the end of the 115th Congress. Trump then renominated Gunter on January 16, 2019, at the outset of the 116th Congress. On May 23, 2019, following a hearing in the Senate Foreign Relations Committee, Gunter was confirmed by the Senate by voice vote. Gunter presented his credentials on July 2, 2019.

Gunter had never visited Iceland prior to his nomination to the ambassadorship.

=== Tenure ===
In July 2020, CBS News reported that Gunter was "paranoid" about his security in the Icelandic capital, Reykjavík, despite its status as one of the world's safest cities. Gunter asked the State Department to seek special permission from the Icelandic government for him to carry a gun, had requested to wear a "stab-proof vest" and have door-to-door armored car service. Three diplomatic sources interviewed by CBS News said that Gunter was persuaded not to arm himself because doing so would be perceived as insulting to Iceland; the embassy nevertheless placed an advertisement in the Icelandic press seeking full-time Icelandic bodyguards, which CBS News' sources described as a way to "placate Gunter's 'irrational' concerns".

According to those interviewed by CBS News, the work climate at the Embassy in Reykjavík was "untenable" under Gunter's leadership. In fewer than two years on the job, Gunter had seven deputy chiefs of mission (DCMs). (The deputy chief of mission is the second-highest position at the embassy.) One DCM was reportedly rejected by Gunter because the ambassador "didn't like the look of him" at their first meeting. The second DCM spent only six months in Iceland, and was followed a series of short-term temporary DCMs with whom Gunter reportedly clashed. CBS News also reported that Gunter "accused others of various, unsubstantiated infractions, including trying to undermine him to Washington and being complicit with the 'deep state.'"

In February 2020, after taking personal leave after a conference in Washington, Gunter refused to return to his post in Reykjavík. The State Department attributed Gunter's delayed return to Iceland to the COVID-19 pandemic; however, "multiple sources in Washington, Reykjavík, and elsewhere said Gunter wanted to work remotely from California and told senior officials he would not go back overseas unless expressly ordered to do so by Secretary of State Mike Pompeo". A series of senior State Department officials failed to persuade Gunter to return. After Pompeo called him, Gunter returned to Iceland in May 2020. Gunter is controversial in Iceland, with many objecting to his description of COVID-19 as "the Invisible China Virus!" on Twitter.

In 2021, the State Department's Office of the Inspector General released a report indicating that Gunter had created a "threatening and intimidating environment" at the embassy.

== Political involvement ==
Gunter was registered as a Democrat in California, but did not contribute to Democratic candidates. However, Federal Election Commission records show that in 2006 he contributed to former Democratic vice-presidential nominee Joe Lieberman—by then running as an independent—in his U.S. Senate campaign against Republican Alan Schlesinger and Democrat Ned Lamont. Gunter's dermatology practice began in California in 1992 and expanded to Nevada in 1995.

=== Donations to Republican Party ===
Gunter has a history of donating to Republican Party candidates, including Liz Cheney, Susan Collins, and Thom Tillis. He is a member of the board of directors of the Republican Jewish Coalition. In 2016, he donated $58,563 to several state Republican Party organizations, $33,400 to the Republican National Committee and $5,400 to Donald Trump's presidential campaign. Gunter also gave $100,000 to the Trump Victory PAC and $100,000 to Trump's 2017 inaugural committee.

=== 2024 U.S. Senate campaign ===
Gunter ran for the Republican nomination for U.S. Senate from Nevada in 2024, seeking to challenge Democratic incumbent Jacky Rosen. In the Republican primary, he ran against Sam Brown, former state Representative Jim Marchant, former lieutenant governor candidate Tony Grady, and nine other candidates.

Republican Party leaders discouraged Gunter from entering the 2024 race, in part because of his record as ambassador and in part because he had not previously voted in any Nevada election. Donald Trump, the National Republican Senatorial Committee and its chair Steve Daines, as well as Senate Minority Leader Mitch McConnell, instead supported Brown. The Koch network's Americans for Prosperity Action super PAC also ran ads in support of Brown. On the campaign trail, Gunter emphasized his loyalty to Trump, described himself as a "staunch supporter" of Trump and what he called Trump's "brilliant" policies, and airing a television ad calling himself "110% pro-Trump" and using Trump slogans. During the race, Gunter declined to say whether he believed the 2020 elections was "stolen" from Trump, declined to say whether he supported a national restriction on abortion, and expressed uncertainty on the causes of climate change.

Gunter faced criticism for attack ads targeting fellow Republican candidate and wounded Afghanistan veteran Sam Brown. The ads, referring to Brown as "the newest creature to emerge from the swamp," included manipulated images that accentuated Brown’s facial scars from a 2008 IED explosion during his military service. Critics, including Brown’s wife Amy and the National Republican Senatorial Committee, called the ads “disgusting” and “inexcusable,” arguing that they mocked a veteran’s combat injuries for political gain. Gunter rejected the criticism, stating that the imagery was intended to portray Brown's political ties to the "Washington swamp" and that he does not "judge people based on appearances".

Following Donald Trump's endorsement of Sam Brown in the Nevada Republican Senate primary, Gunter posted on X (formerly Twitter) suggesting that the endorsement was the result of a "pay for play" arrangement. The Trump campaign responded by rejecting the accusation. Senior advisor Chris LaCivita wrote on X that the claim was "proof point as to why @DrJeffGunter didn’t earn the endorsement of @realDonaldTrump", adding that Gunter had "a habit of making up crap" and that "President Trump makes his own decisions and this is another example of him choosing wisely".

=== 2026 U.S. House campaign ===
Gunter was then a candidate for the United States House of Representatives in 2026 in Nevada's 3rd congressional district. He placed third in the Republican primary, losing to Martin O'Donnell.

Diplomatic posts
Preceded by Robert C. Barber	United States Ambassador to Iceland; 2019–2021	Succeeded by Carrin Patman
