= Steinn Steinarr =

Icelandic poet

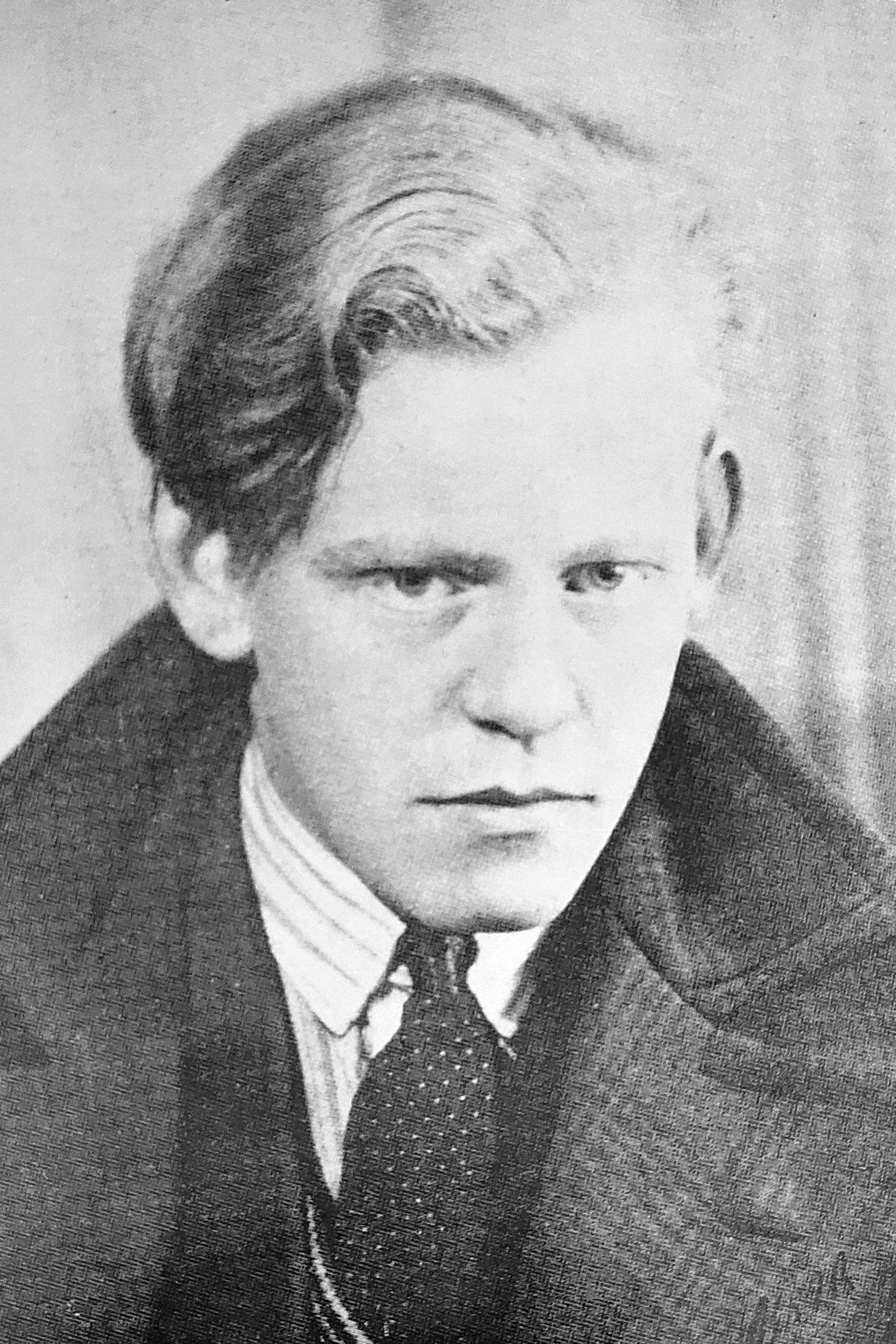
Steinn Steinarr

Steinn Steinarr (born Aðalsteinn Kristmundsson, 13 October 1908 – 25 May 1958) was an Icelandic poet. He is one of Iceland's major poets and wrote both modernist and traditional poems.

== Early life ==
Steinn Steinarr was nicknamed Alli (a standard nickname for Aðalsteinn). His farm laborer parents in northwest Iceland (sveitabæ) were so poor that the local authorities divided up the family. The three oldest children were shipped off for adoption, during which relocation the oldest died. The rest of the family was escorted off to a west coast farm. Before long Alli was the only family member left on the farm, where he languished in misery. In all probability the world would never have heard from him again had it not been for an elderly governess three years later. Her name was Kristin Tómasdóttir. She discovered the boy by accident and was so shocked to witness the abuse he had suffered that she adopted him on the spot.

Steinn wasn't an ordinary child, but a rebellious, undisciplined loner who loved to ponder and read but detested physical work. His attitude soon earned him the wrath of the local kids who wasted no time before ganging up on him. Though he was quick to wield nasty limericks.

His second lucky break came in the person of a widely beloved Icelandic poet, Stefán frá Hvítadal, who happened to live in his county. When he heard some of the boy's “poetry” he urged his foster family not to punish but to encourage him. One of his teachers, a talented young poet, Jóhannes úr Kötlum, agreed. But poetry was a luxury for a destitute farm boy. In 1926, at the age of 18, he moved to Reykjavík. Penniless and friendless in the fast-growing capital, he was determined to make good. Despite his aversion to physical work he swallowed his pride and labored day and night in the building industry. His reward was a serious attack of polio that left him with a paralyzed left side.

Once again Stefán came to his rescue. He took him to his friend Erlendur who ran the "infamous" Unuhús coffee-house, a hangout for avant-garde artists and thinkers. It was there that a new generation of well-known left wing writers, including Halldór Laxness and Þórbergur Þórðarson, met and discussed the fate of their nation and the world.

== The Great Depression ==
Stefán and Laxness were fervent Catholics and urged their protégé to follow suit. By then had the arrival of the Great Depression reached Iceland. Along with some of his Unuhús friends he was present when the Communist Party of Iceland saw its first light of day towards the end of 1930. Suddenly, his only childhood friend drowned when his fishing boat went down in a storm. The aftermath resulted in Alli's first official poem, which was a eulogy to his former ally.

Soon Iceland was sinking into chaos. After a riot ripped the capital apart in 1932 he got involved in the workers’ struggle. A year later he and a group of men trampled on a Nazi flag in a fishing village in the north of the country. The case went all the way to the Supreme Court. Despite the two-month suspended jail sentence, his comrades used this opportunity to oust Steinn from the Communist Party.

In 1933 his idol, Tómas Guðmundsson, published his second book of poetry. Adalsteinn's first book – written under his new pen name, Steinn Steinarr - came out a year later (both parts of his pen name derive from the second half of his given name, Aðalsteinn). Although it was obvious that he had studied Tómas's poetry, their view of the world could hardly have been more different. Tómas' volume was called Beautiful World (Fagra veröld). An instant hit, the book made its author the darling of the bourgeoisie. By contrast Steinn called his work The Red Flame Burns (Rauður loginn brann) and got a glowing reception from Iceland's working classes.

When his second book, Poems (Ljóð), came out three years later his former comrades were quick to point out that the red flame of revolution had given way to the white smoke of self-doubt. Soon afterward he met an attractive young lady, Ásthildur Björnsdóttir, who was a great admirer of him and his poetry. No sooner had they started to date, however, than her family forced her to terminate this unwelcome relationship.

== The later years ==
Ever since Iceland had obtained its independence from Denmark in 1918 the arts in Iceland had been on a roll. Then the Depression set in and by 1939 professional artists could no longer survive without government stipends and handouts. At that very moment in time one of the nation's most powerful politician, Jónas frá Hriflu, was put in charge of government funding of the arts. The timing could not have been more unfortunate for Steinarr, since Jónsson was a cultural reactionary who considered all forms of modern art "degenerate", and anyone who opposed him a “Communist”.

Meanwhile, thanks to the war, avant-garde artists from around the world were returning home in droves full of new and revolutionary ideas, dying to turn this cultural backwater upside down. Among the newcomers were two young and attractive abstract painters, Louisa Matthíasdóttir and Nína Tryggvadóttir, fresh from their studies in Paris. Erlendur suggested that Steinn model for Nína. Through Nína he soon met and modeled for Louisa. Before long Steinn and “his girls” were the talk of town.

In May 1940, the Allied occupation of Iceland began. Finally Iceland's economy began to pick up steam. The same year Steinn's third book of poems, Footprints in Sand (Fótspor í sandi) came out and was well received. For the first time he was earning a bit of money from his poetry. Meanwhile, Louisa was beginning to turn his life around. From now on some of his greatest poetry would be inspired by his deepening love and admiration for her. They even began to work on a book together based on his poem about a little country girl, Halla. Just as his fourth and most successful book of poetry to date, Journey without Destination (Ferð án fyrirheits), hit the stores in December 1942. Louisa went to New York to continue her studies. Not long after Nina joined her.

In 1943 Steinn's brilliant satire about Hitler and the Nazis, The Tin Soldiers (Tindátarnir), superbly illustrated by Nína, came out. In 1948, he married his former girlfriend, Ásthildur Björnsdottir. The same year his masterpiece, Time and Water, was finally published securing his reputation as Iceland's foremost modern poet. In 1955 Halldór Laxness, his mentor and ally, received the Nobel Prize for literature. Steinn Steinarr died three years later, on 25 May 1958. He was 49 years old. His widow, Ásthildur, died on 18 July 1998. She was 81. After Louisa died in the year 2000 the manuscript that they worked on together, Halla, was rediscovered and published. The book became Steinn Steinarr's seventh and final book of poetry.

== The poetry ==
Steinn Steinarr is sometimes considered the first important Icelandic modernist poet, but he also had a strong command of traditional Icelandic poetics. His poetry has aged remarkably well. In fact it is in many ways more relevant today than it was when it was written. One reason may be that his principal theme, the struggle of the eternal loner/outsider against the entrenched tyranny of corrupt power, remains at least as true now as it did back in the 1930s and '40s. Another reason may be that Steinn's works are an outgrowth of one of the world's great literary traditions: the poetry of the mediaeval Icelandic skalds, noted for their complex and riddling style, although Steinn was also one of the first Icelandic poets to move away from the dominance of strict meter and alliteration.

== Examples of style ==
Here is a well known stanza from one of his works (VI 1):

Lífs um angurs víðan vang
víst ég ganginn herði,
eikin spanga, í þitt fang
oft mig langa gerði.

Translation:

Across life's broad plain of grief
I surely quickened my pace;
oh lady, in your embrace
often I did long to be.

This is not only a perfect imitation of the style of the rímur, with the sometimes inherent repetitiveness of syntax and the circumlocutions known as kenningar (the word for "lady" in the original is a traditional kenning component literally denoting an oak tree, though the skaldic device of the heiti happens to be absent here), but it has just that little bit of its author's own invention to make it art in its own right too.

Another stanza actually makes the whole point clear (I 4):

Þó ég meini þetta og hitt,
þér ég reyna vil að segja:
þú ert eina yndið mitt
unz ég seinast fer að deyja.

Translation:

Although I mean this and that,
I want to try to tell you:
you alone are my darling
until at last I die.

Here there are no poetical circumlocutions, just ice-cold irony.

Steinn Steinarr's best known work is The Time and the Water, of which the following is the first part.

Tíminn er eins og vatnið,
og vatnið er kalt og djúpt
eins og vitund mín sjálfs.

Translation:

Time is like the water,
and the water is cold and deep
like my own consciousness.

— Translation by Marshall Brement

The second stanza here may be regarded as an object lesson in the difficulty of translation, and perhaps of translating the work of Steinn Steinarr in particular. Its second line may refer to a picture painted "of" the water, or, just as readily, to a picture painted "by" the water, i.e. to a picture the water paints, since "of" and "by" are both among the possible translations of the preposition af. This is all the more important since the first two words of the third line of the stanza simply mean "and me" and do not themselves indicate whether the picture is painted of the narrator or by him. Also, whereas the translator here has interpreted til hálfs in the third line of the stanza as indicating that the narrator has painted half the picture, it is commonly used as an idiom to mean "imperfectly" or "inadequately". Thus the third line here may, for example, mean "and me, imperfectly". This would be consistent with an interpretation according to which both the water and the narrator were inadequate painters. Furthermore, the word máluð in the second line, translated here as "painted", can also mean "worded" or "put into words": this use of the word was archaic by the time this poem was written, but so was a good deal of the skaldic diction Steinn used elsewhere in his poetry.

Steinn satirized anything and everything, and spared nobody, as can be seen from his poem "Ein sorgleg vísa um Sósíalistaflokkinn og mig" ("One Tragic Poem about the Socialist Party and Me"). Another very well known poem is "Passíusálmur No. 51" ("Passion Psalm No. 51"). The title is a reference to the greatest work of legendary Icelandic poet Hallgrímur Pétursson (d. 1674), Passíusálmar (Passion Psalms), 50 in all.

== List of original works ==
- 1934-Rauður loginn brann (The Red Flame Burnt)
- 1937-Ljóð (Poems)
- 1940-Fótspor í sandi (Footprints in Sand)
- 1942-Ferð án fyrirheits (Journey without Destination)
- 1943-Tindátarnir (The Tin Soldiers)
- 1948-Tíminn og vatnið (The Time and the Water)
- 2000-Halla
