= National retail sales tax =

A national retail sales tax (NRST) is a type of retail sales tax levied on a national level, a sales tax levied on retail sales.

Taxes and proposals for such taxes include:

- FairTax (U.S.A.), a proposal to replace most existing nationally levied taxes with a single retail sales tax
- nationally levied consumer value-added tax (VAT)
  - Value-added tax (United Kingdom)
- nationally levied consumer goods and services tax (GST)
  - Goods and Services Tax (Australia)
  - Goods and Services Tax (Canada)
  - Goods and Services Tax (Hong Kong)
  - Goods and Services Tax (New Zealand)
  - Goods and Services Tax (Singapore)

== See also ==
- Consumption tax
