= Mel Behney =

American baseball player (born 1947)

- Pitcher
- Born: September 2, 1947 (age 77); Newark, New Jersey
- Batted: Left Threw: Left

MLB debut
- August 14, 1970, for the Cincinnati Reds

Last MLB appearance
- September 20, 1970, for the Cincinnati Reds

MLB statistics
- Win–loss record: 0–2
- Earned run average: 4.50
- Strikeouts: 2
- Stats at Baseball Reference

Teams
- Cincinnati Reds (1970)

Melvin Brian Behney (born September 2, 1947) is an American former professional baseball player. Behney was a left-handed pitcher who had a five-game trial, one as a starting pitcher, with the 1970 Cincinnati Reds of Major League Baseball. He stood 6 feet 2 inches (1.88 m) tall and weighed 180 pounds (82 kg).

Behney is a 1965 graduate of Verona High School in Verona, New Jersey, where he was a two-time all-state selection in baseball and also starred in basketball. He received a four-year baseball scholarship to Michigan State University, where he studied chemistry and business. He played on the Spartans' baseball teams in 1967 and 1968 and was named all-Big Ten during the latter season. He was later named one of the top 100 MSU athletes of the 20th century. He later earned a Bachelor of Arts degree in Economics.

== Career ==
The Cincinnati Reds chose him with their first selection in the June secondary phase of the 1968 Major League Baseball draft, and Behney began his professional career at the Short Season-A level. In 1969, he won 14 games for the Asheville Tourists, to finish one game behind the Southern League's leader in victories, Bill Zepp.

The following season, 1970, Behney made his debut in the Major Leagues with the first incarnation of the Reds' "Big Red Machine" team that dominated the National League West Division race, winning by 14 1/2 games, then swept the Pittsburgh Pirates in the 1970 National League Championship Series. In his debut on August 14 at Riverfront Stadium against the Philadelphia Phillies, he relieved starter Wayne Simpson in the fourth inning of a scoreless contest, but gave up five hits and five runs (three of them earned), and was pinned with the defeat in a 5–4 Philadelphia win.

Four days later, in his only MLB starting assignment, at home against the Montreal Expos, Behney lasted 4 2/3 innings and gave up six hits and five runs — but only one run was earned as the Reds committed three errors behind him. The Reds could not overcome the five-run deficit, losing 7–4. Behney then appeared in three more MLB games that season in relief and surrendered only one more earned run in four innings. He did not appear in the postseason. In 10 innings for Cincinnati, Behney gave up 15 hits, five earned runs, and eight bases on balls and struck out two.

After spending the full seasons of 1971–1972 at the Triple-A level, Behney was traded to the Boston Red Sox during spring training in 1973 for pinch hitter and utility man Phil Gagliano and reserve outfielder Andy Kosco, who were role players on Cincinnati's 1973 NL West championship team. Behney played one more season of Triple-A before leaving the game.

== Personal life ==
After his pro baseball career ended, he became a licensed real estate appraiser and from 1987 to 2000 he was Commercial Department Manager for the Tarrant County, Texas Appraisal District. He was the department's Litigation Specialist from 2000 to 2003. In 2005, he was elected to the Verona High School Alumni Association Hall of Fame.

He currently lives in Arlington, Texas and since 2007 has been a manager at First American Commercial Real Estate Services.
