= Samantha Futerman =

Korean-American actress

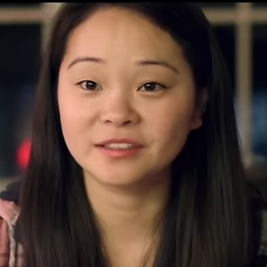
- Born: Ra-Hee Chung; Busan, South Korea
- Occupations: Actress, Director, Activist
- Years active: 2005–present
- Spouse: Ryan Miyamoto (m. 2022)
- Children: 1 (daughter)

Samantha Futerman (Korean 서맨사 푸터먼, born Ra-Hee Chung), is a South Korean-born American actress, writer, director, and activist. She is known for her supporting role in the drama film Memoirs of a Geisha, set in Japan around World War II. She is also known for her self-made documentary film Twinsters, about how she discovered the identical twin sister she was not aware she had through Facebook and their journey after the truth is revealed.

== Personal life ==
Futerman was born in Busan, South Korea and given the name Ra-Hee Chung. She was later adopted by American parents, Jackie and Judd Futerman, and has two brothers, Matt and Andrew. Raised in Verona, New Jersey, Futerman graduated from Verona High School in 2005. Afterward, she went to Boston University's College of Fine Arts and received her Bachelor of Fine Arts. In 2011, Futerman moved to Los Angeles to pursue her interest in acting. In 2012, Futerman made an appearance in KevJumba's YouTube video, High School Virgin. After coming across this video, Futerman's identical twin sister, Anaïs Bordier, from whom she had been separated at birth and of whom she had no knowledge, contacted Futerman through Facebook on February 21, 2013. Immediately after, Futerman decided to work with co-director Ryan Miyamoto to document the twins' journey. With the help of Nancy Segal, the women took a DNA test, which confirmed that Futerman and Anaïs are, in fact, twins. In May 2013, the women met in person for the first time when Futerman decided to visit Anaïs at school in London.

The two sisters have made a documentary film about their lives called Twinsters, which debuted on March 15, 2015, at the South by Southwest Film Festival. The film begins with the women's first Skype conversation and moves on to them meeting each other in person and their trip to the adoptee conference in Seoul, South Korea, where they also meet their foster mothers.

Since meeting her sister, Futerman has been advocating for adoption. She worked with Jenna Ushkowitz to co-found the Kindred: Foundation of Adoption.

On March 19, 2022, Futerman married Ryan Miyamoto, who co-directed the film Twinsters with her, at a ceremony held in New York City. In 2024, she gave birth to her daughter.

== Career ==
At the age of 16, Futerman made her feature film debut in 2005 with the leading role in The Motel. That same year, Futerman received her role in the movie Memoirs of a Geisha, for which she gained international attention with her role of Satsu. In early 2007, Futerman had a supporting role in Dear Lemon Lima opposite Meaghan Martin and Academy Award winner Melissa Leo. Futerman is also known for roles in Going the Distance and 21 & Over.

== Filmography ==
Film
Year	Title	Role	Notes
2005	The Motel	Christine	
2005	Memoirs of a Geisha	Satsu	
2007	Dear Lemon Lima	Nothing Madeline Amigone	
2007	Across The Universe	Prom Dancer	Uncredited
2008	Harold	Katy	
2010	Going The Distance	Very Young Intern	
2013	21 & Over	Sally Huang	
2013	Man-Up	Regan	
2014	Alice	Alice	Short Film
2015	Twinsters	Herself	Documentary, also screenwriter and director LAAPFF Grand Jury Prize (2015); Nominated - SXSW Grand Jury Award (2015); Nominated - SXSW Gamechanger Award (2015)
2017	How to Define the Relationship	Jan	Short Film
2021	From Here	Jess	Short Film, also screenwriter and director

Television
Year	Title	Role	Notes
2011	A Gifted Man	Monica Lee	Episode: "In Case of Loss of Control"
2012	Up All Night	Riley	Episode: "Daddy Daughter Time"
2012	Harry's Law	Madison Tanaka	Episode: "The Contest"
2013	The Big C	Lydia Hye	Episodes: "Quality of Life", "You Can't Take It With You"
2013–15	Kroll Show	Tunes	5 episodes
2014	Suburgatory	Katie	Episode: "About a Boy-Yoi-Yoing"
2014	Law and Order Special Victims Unit	Annie Lin	Episode: "Pattern 17"
2015–2016	John Hughes Ruined My Life	Sam	
2023	The Rookie	Gamer	Episode: "The Naked and the Dead"

== Bibliography ==
- Separated @ Birth: A True Love Story of Twin Sisters Reunited, with Anaïs Bordier, G. P. Putnam's Sons, 2014
