= Verona High School (New Jersey) =

High school in Essex County, New Jersey, US

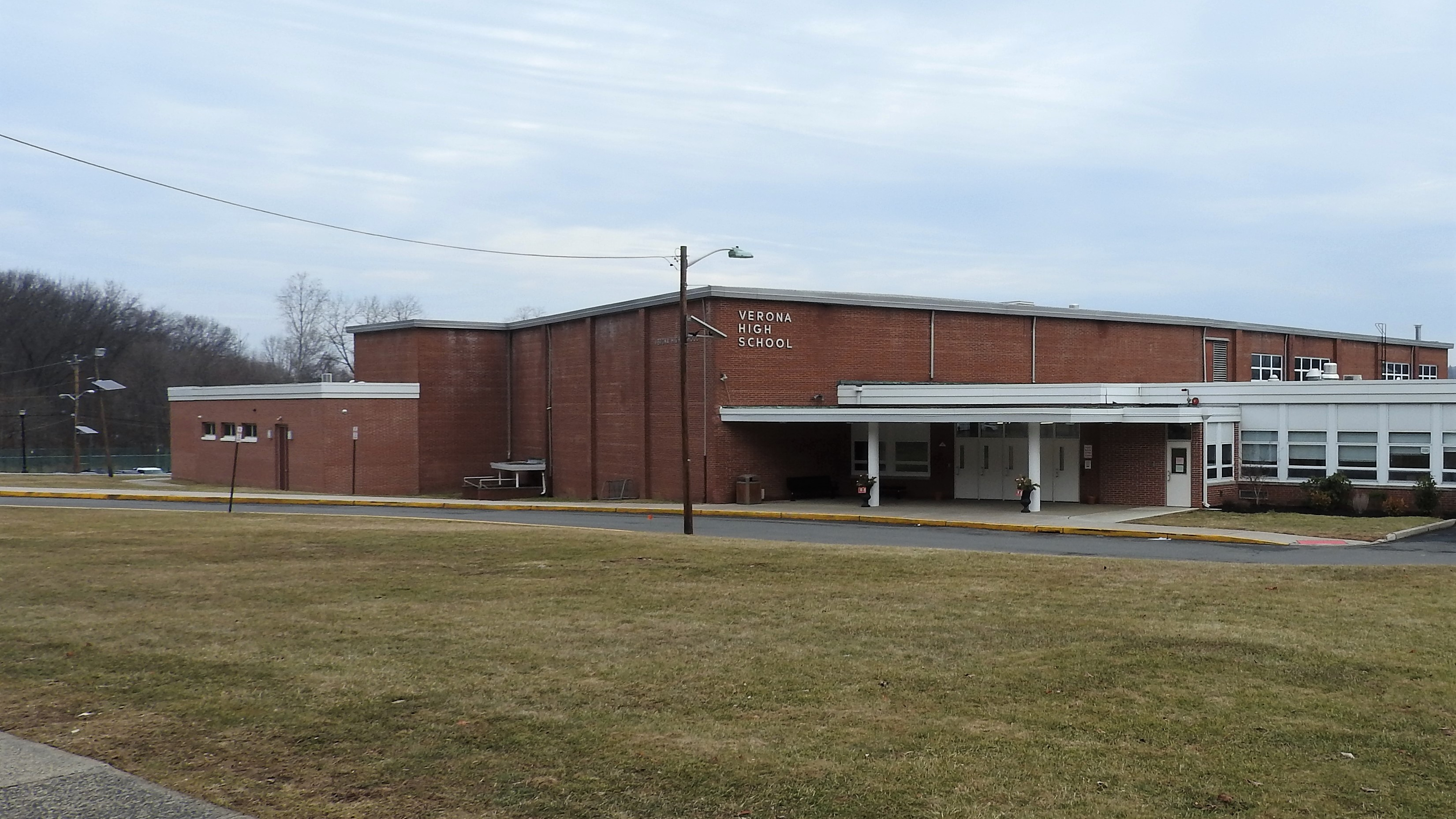
- Verona High School, February 2018

Location
- 151 Fairview Avenue; Verona, Essex County, New Jersey 07044; United States; 40.842635°N 74.247717°W

Information
- Type: Public high school
- Motto: Your Future Starts Here
- School district: Verona Public Schools
- NCES School ID: 341674002448
- Principal: Joshua Cogdill
- Faculty: 54.0 FTEs
- Grades: 9–12
- Enrollment: 628 (as of 2023–24)
- Student to teacher ratio: 11.6:1
- Colors: Maroon and white
- Athletics conference: Super Essex Conference (general); North Jersey Super Football Conference (football)
- Team name: Hillbillies
- Publication: Avant Garde (literary magazine)
- Newspaper: The Fairviewer
- Yearbook: Shadows
- Website: www.veronaschools.org/o/vhs

Verona High School is a four-year comprehensive community public high school, serving students in ninth through twelfth grade in Verona, in Essex County, in the U.S. state of New Jersey, operating as the lone secondary school of the Verona Public Schools. The school has been accredited by the Middle States Association of Colleges and Schools Commission on Elementary and Secondary Schools since 1947.

As of the 2023–24 school year, the school had an enrollment of 628 students and 54.0 classroom teachers (on an FTE basis), for a student–teacher ratio of 11.6:1. There were 3 students (0.5% of enrollment) eligible for free lunch and none eligible for reduced-cost lunch.

The school mascot is the Verona Hillbilly, which reflected the remote, rural nature of the community. It was originally created in the 1950s and pictured with a bottle of moonshine and a shotgun. The mascot later was redesigned with a dog and a fishing pole due to concerns of school violence and under-age drinking.

== Awards, recognition and rankings ==
Verona High School won the New Jersey Star School Award for the 1995–96 school year. The school won the New Jersey Best Practice Award in the 1995–96 school year for Citizenship / Tolerance in recognition of its program in Prejudice Reduction. In the 1997–98 school year, it received the Best Practice Award for Citizenship & Character Education in recognition of Teaching Responsibility Through Involvement.

The school was the 56th-ranked public high school in New Jersey out of 339 schools statewide in New Jersey Monthly magazine's September 2014 cover story on the state's "Top Public High Schools", using a new ranking methodology. The school had been ranked 70th in the state of 328 schools in 2012, after being ranked 53rd in 2010 out of 322 schools listed. The magazine ranked the school 53rd in 2008 out of 316 schools. The school was ranked 47th in the magazine's September 2006 issue, which included 316 schools across the state. Schooldigger.com ranked the school tied for 133rd out of 381 public high schools statewide in its 2011 rankings (an increase of 33 positions from the 2010 ranking) which were based on the combined percentage of students classified as proficient or above proficient on the mathematics (83.7%) and language arts literacy (95.4%) components of the High School Proficiency Assessment (HSPA).

In the 2011 "Ranking America's High Schools" issue by The Washington Post, the school was ranked 59th in New Jersey and 1,718th nationwide.

In its 2013 report on "America's Best High Schools", The Daily Beast ranked the school 718th in the nation among participating public high schools and 56th among schools in New Jersey.

== Athletics ==
The Verona High School Hillbillies compete in the Super Essex Conference, which is comprised of public and private high schools in Essex County and was established following a reorganization of sports leagues in Northern New Jersey by the New Jersey State Interscholastic Athletic Association (NJSIAA). Prior to the realignment in 2010, the school had participated in the Colonial Hills Conference, which included public and private high schools covering Essex County, Morris County and Somerset County in Northern New Jersey. With 529 students in grades 10-12, the school was classified by the NJSIAA for the 2019–20 school year as Group II for most athletic competition purposes, which included schools with an enrollment of 486 to 758 students in that grade range. The football team competes in the National White division of the North Jersey Super Football Conference, which includes 112 schools competing in 20 divisions, making it the nation's biggest football-only high school sports league. The school was classified by the NJSIAA as Group I North for football for 2024–2026, which included schools with 254 to 474 students.

The school participates as the host school / lead agency in a joint ice hockey team with Glen Ridge High School. The co-op program operates under agreements scheduled to expire at the end of the 2023–24 school year.

The boys spring / outdoor track team won the Group I state championship in 1943-1945, 1948-1950 and 1952-1954.

The boys' basketball team won the Group II state championship in 1957 (defeating Ocean City High School in the tournament's final game) and 2017 (vs. Woodbury High School). The 1957 team won the Group II title with a 43-40 win against an Ocean City team that came into the championship game undefeated. The 2017 team won the program's second state title with a 69-54 win against Woodbury in the Group II tournament championship game and went into the Tournament of Champions as the sixth seed, falling in the quarterfinals to Don Bosco Preparatory High School by a score of 61-51 after leading in the middle of the fourth quarter.

The boys' soccer team won the Group II championship in 1957 and 1960 (vs. Irvington Tech High School both years), 1966 (vs. Morris Knolls High School) and 1976 (vs. Lawrence High School), and won the Group I title in 1981 (vs. Montgomery High School) and 2016 (as co-champion with Haddon Township High School) and won the Group III state title in 1958 (as co-champion with Chatham Borough High School) and 1959 (vs. Jonathan Dayton High School), won .

The boys' tennis team won the Group I state championship in 1981, against Pitman High School in the final match of the tournament.

The football team has won the North II Group I state sectional championship in 2001 and 2008, the North I Group I title in 2014 and 2015, and the North II Group II title in 2019. A successful pass for a two-point conversion by future NFL player Anthony Fasano on a flubbed point after touchdown provided the margin of victory, as the 2001 team defeated Cedar Grove High School by a score of 15-14 in the North II Group I sectional championship game and finished the season with an 8-4 record. In 2008, the football team finished the season with an 11–1 record and were North II Group I state champions with a 13–12 victory over Hoboken High School in the final, earning the program's first sectional title since 2001. The 2014 football team won the North I Group I state championship defeating Cresskill High School by a score of 20–0 in MetLife Stadium in East Rutherford. The Hillbillies finished the season 11–0, clinching the first undefeated season in program history. The football team won the North I Group I state championship in 2015, defeating rival Cedar Grove by a score of 21–14 at Kean University, finishing the season 12-0 and clinching the second undefeated season in program history. The team won the North II Group II sectional championship in 2019 with a 43-2 win against Lenape Valley Regional High School in the tournament final and went on to win the Group II North regional bowl with a 47-0 win against Lyndhurst High School, finishing the season undefeated. In October 2017, Lou Racioppe, the head coach of Verona's football team, was suspended as part of an administrative investigation into conduct towards his players following complaints from parents. In 2017, many members of the community voiced concern over the investigation and publicly expressed their anger towards the administration during a hearing before the Board of Education. Former players showed up in support of the former coach. In early November, Racioppe was informed that he would not be reinstated as coach of the team to much dismay of the community.

The girls spring track team was Group I champion in 2005.

The softball team won the North II Group II title in 2005 (after an 8-2 ein in the tournament final against Belvidere High School), 2019 (with a 6-2 win against Hanover Park High School) and 2021 (defeating Parsippany High School by a score of 1-0).

The girls volleyball team won the Group I title in 2017, the program's first, defeating Bogota High School in a rematch of the 2016 final.

=== 2007–08 ===
In the 2007–08 school year, the men's cross country team defeated Pingry School for the conference victory. It was the first in school history. The following week, the team followed up with a state sectional championship, the first since 1980 when they tied with Kinnelon High School for the title.

=== 2008–09 ===
The boys indoor track and field team won their first conference championship, as well as winning the North II Group I state sectional championship. The boys and girls both won the North I, Group I state sectional championship for indoor and outdoor track, a first for the boys' squad, and for the second consecutive year for the girls' squad.

=== 2009–10 ===
The boys' indoor track and field team won their second consecutive Colonial Hills Conference championship, and North I Group I state sectional championship.

The girls' basketball team won the Super Essex Conference (SEC) championship, the program's first conference title since 1976.

=== 2015–16 ===
The Verona / Glen Ridge ice hockey team defeated Montclair Kimberley Academy by a score of 4–2 to win the McInnis Cup.

== Drama ==
Verona High has a long history of drama clubs and productions.

Productions began in the 1920s with Edmond Rostand's The Romancers (1926) being the final production directed by Winifred Bostwick, a long-time teacher at the school. Other shows helmed by Bostwick had included The Exchange (1922), The Man Who Married a Dumb Wife (1923) and The Knave of Hearts in 1925.

Harold Butterworth was a longtime director for the club (1936–1956). Under his direction, the drama club boasted its largest membership (137 registered members in 1945), became The Troupers in 1951 and continued to present contemporary dramas. Then, after Butterworth's tenure, The Troupers presented their first "classic" play: Thornton Wilder's Our Town, also the last play performed at the then-VHS building that is now H. B. Whitehorne Middle School.

A series of directors took the Troupers into Fairview Avenue's newly constructed Verona High School, where they performed such classics as The Man Who Came to Dinner (1958), You Can't Take It with You (1960), and Arsenic and Old Lace (1962). Sometime in this era, the title Troupers disappeared in favor of the more generic Drama Club.

In the early 1970s, classic productions dominated: Harvey (1972, directed by Ruth Garoni), a new production of Arsenic and Old Lace (1973 and presented again in 1993) and the first production of a true Broadway musical – Oliver!, combining the students of the high school and middle school under the music direction of long-time Verona band teacher, Harry Owens. Director Jim Walsh continued dramatic shows on alternate years with Scapino, Count Dracula, and The Good Doctor.

In the early 80s, Maurice J. Moran began his 27-year tenure as drama advisor and introduced both a non-musical and musical in the same school year. The Importance of Being Earnest, Mame (1982), Grease (1984), The Fantasticks (1985), Godspell (1986), The Odd Couple, "Story Theater" and The Crucible are some examples of shows done in the 80s.

In 1991, the VHS Drama Club became The Spotlight Players. In 1996, VHS joined 100 other New Jersey high schools participating in the Paper Mill Playhouse's Rising Star Awards, winning a "best actress" nomination in its first year with a repeat production of Anything Goes. New plays and classic musicals (and Star nominations) continued as the 90s closed: All in the Timing, The Canterbury Tales, and Senior Square contrasting with Gypsy, The Music Man, and Pippin.

The 21st century began with what was apparently only the second VHS Shakespeare presentation thus far: A Midsummer Night's Dream. In that same year, parent volunteers organized themselves to help the performing arts as The Spotlight Players Parents Association. To raise funds for the theater program, the parents' group began the annual Verona Talent Night, which continues to give an opportunity for Verona students, adults, and friends to sing, dance, play musical instruments, or tell jokes without the need for competition.

In 2002, for the first time, a completely student-produced musical was presented, Bat Boy: The Musical. The show was presented by the then-recently established local chapter of the International Thespian Society, and featured a student cast, with a student director, music director, band, and choreographer. Other productions have included Godspell, You're A Good Man, Charlie Brown, and the 2006 presentation of Musical of Musicals, being featured in The Star-Ledger's "Young and Talented" column.

Another major change was the hiring of an outside director. After 30 years directing school musicals around North Jersey, Moran decided to give up that role and serve instead as a producer of the musicals. He continued to direct the non-musicals (Moon Over Buffalo in 2005, for example) but recent musicals have been directed by non-VHS faculty, with 2008's On the Town being the third production directed by Danielle Aldrich.

Verona's drama program expanded in 2008, with the revamping of the theater including new seats, better acoustics, and a new lighting and sound booth. A One-Act Play Festival began in May of that year, bringing the number of theater offerings to four per year.

In Fall 2016, the program relaunched with the hiring of Laurence Fry and Steven Munoz to head the program after the retirement of Fran Young. The first production put on under the new team was You Can't Take It With You by George S. Kaufman and Moss Hart in November 2016. Next was the classic Cole Porter musical Anything Goes in March 2017. The next year, Fry departed the program, and it continued under Munoz with their next production, The Curious Savage by John Patrick in November 2017, with two of the performers being nominated for "Foxy Awards" - Ava Vasalani (Ethel Savage) for Lead Actress, and Maya Fortgang (Fairy May) for Supporting Actress. The musical that school year was Curtains in March 2018, which became the first VHS musical to participate in the Rising Star Awards since Munoz took over. In fall 2018, the production was The Secret in the Wings, a Mary Zimmerman play. To fundraise for the program, the Spotlight Players put on a "murder mystery" dinner, where the actors, with packets of information on the mystery, would go table to table, talking to the guests about the investigation at hand. The dinner took place in January 2019. The next musical was The Addams Family in March 2019, which was one of the more successful productions in recent years for the program, earning around $9,000 in ticket sales alone.

On April 12, 2019, the nominations for Montclair State University's Theatre Night "Foxy" Awards were announced. VHS's production of The Secret in the Wings was nominated in five categories, including Outstanding Achievement in Choreography/Movement, Outstanding Achievement in Stage Crew, Outstanding Achievement by an Acting Ensemble of a Dramatic Stage Adaptation of a Literary Work or Film, Outstanding Production of a Drama Stage Adaptation of Literary Work or Film, and Excellence in Dramaturgy.

The fall play of 2019 was the classic William Shakespeare comedic play, The Comedy of Errors, one of few Shakespearean productions ever performed at Verona High School. The production was performed on November 14, 15, and 16th, 2019. Their next production was the musical The Mystery of Edwin Drood on March 5, 6, and 7th, 2020. In addition, the Spotlight Players also presented their second annual murder mystery, "Once Upon a Murder", in January 2020 at Verona Community Center. On April 15, the nominations for the 2020 Theatre Night "Foxy" Awards were announced, and VHS's production of The Comedy of Errors was nominated in four categories - Supporting Actor in a Classical Play (Griffin Willner as Egeon), Lead Actor in a Classical Play (Aidan Callari as Antipholus of Syracuse), Lead Actress in a Classical Play (Abby Bermeo as Dromio of Ephesus), and Acting Ensemble of a Classical Play.

== Student organizations ==
=== Do Anything Nice (D.A.N.) ===
Do Anything Nice (D.A.N.) is a student-led organization that demonstrates the importance of acts of kindness in everyday life and leads in creative strategies for people to practice kindness in their daily lives. D.A.N. members engage in innovative new methods to bring community service to educational institutions.

Founded by a small group of senior students, VHS D.A.N. is now in its 7th year active at Verona High School. In fall 2001 the first random act of kindness was to put candy in every student's locker during the evening hours of the night. Since then the club has expanded to include a second D.A.N. chapter located at Ithaca College, Ithaca, New York, that is now in its 3rd year active.

== Administration ==
The school's principal is Joshua Cogdill. His core administration team includes the assistant principal.

== Controversies ==
In April 2022, school librarian and technology coordinator Elissa Malespina was unexpectedly terminated from her role due to her attempts to include diversity within displays in the library. Her annual evaluation noted that her "approach to library displays creates a student space that is not inclusive enough," and that she would not be asked to return for the 2022-23 school year. Math and computer science teacher and 20 year veteran of the school Richard Wertz suggested that this sudden negativity followed outcries from parents in the community. Malespina went on medical leave for the remainder of the school year.

== Notable alumni ==
- Kevin Bannon (born 1957, class of 1975), basketball coach at The College of New Jersey (Trenton State College), Rider University and Rutgers University
- Mel Behney (born 1947, class of 1965), former MLB pitcher who played for the Cincinnati Reds
- Lorinda Cherry (1944–2022), computer scientist and programmer who spent much of her career at Bell Labs
- Jay Curtis (1950–2018, class of 1968), author, producer, writer, director and actor, who co-directed 75-0: The Documentary, about a 1966 loss by a score of 75–0 to Madison High School, part of a 32-game losing streak
- Dan DePalma (born 1989), wide receiver who played in the Canadian Football League for the Saskatchewan Roughriders
- Anthony Fasano (born 1984), former NFL tight end
- Samantha Futerman (born 1987), actress known for her supporting role in the drama film Memoirs of a Geisha and for her self-made documentary film Twinsters, about her newly discovered identical twin
- Jed Graef (born 1942, class of 1960), gold medal winner in the men's 200-meter backstroke at the 1964 Summer Olympics in Tokyo
- Barbara J. Griffiths (born 1949), diplomat who was the United States Ambassador to Iceland from 1999 to 2002
- Fred Hill Jr. (born 1959, class of 1977), head coach of Rutgers University men's basketball team 2006–10; assistant coach at Seton Hall
- Nicole McLaughlin (class of 2011), artist and designer, best known for upcycled fashion pieces
- Jay Mohr (born 1970), comedian, actor and sports radio personality
- Kal Parekh, actor who appeared in ABC-TV series Pan Am
- Steve Santarsiero (born 1965, class of 1983), politician who has served in the Pennsylvania State Senate
- Donald J. Strait (1918–2015), flying ace in the 356th Fighter Group during World War II and a career officer in the United States Air Force
- Bruce Wands (1949–2022, class of 1967), educator, author, artist, and musician, with a specific interest in digital art

== Popular culture ==
The original, unaired pilot of the television show Strangers with Candy was filmed in Verona High School. The VHS signboard is also used in almost every episode thereafter to display various witticisms, although the name has been changed to that of the school in the show, Flatpoint High School.

Portions of the 2024 film I Saw the TV Glow were filmed at the high school.
