= Disasterpiece (disambiguation) =

Disasterpiece or Disasterpieces may refer to:

- "Disasterpiece", a 2001 song by Slipknot from Iowa (album)
- Disasterpieces, a 2002 video album by Slipknot
- Disasterpiece, a 2026 album by Mori Calliope

== See also ==
- Disasterpeace (born 1986), American musician
- Disasterpiece Theatre, US television program
