= Eugénie Olson =

American-born author of three books

Eugénie Seifer Olson
- Occupations: novelist, editor
- Writing career
- Genre: Chick lit

Eugénie Seifer Olson is an American-born author of three books. Raised in Verona, New Jersey, Eugénie has lived in several locations on the Eastern Seaboard including Princeton, Philadelphia and Boston. She currently lives in Somerville, Massachusetts, with her husband David, their two cats, Kiddun and Loki, and their fish, Lulu.

She is in the chick lit category of writers.

Eugénie's first book, Babe in Toyland released in March 2004 from Avon, follows Toby Morris, a 25-year-old working in a toy company who falls for her handsome weatherman, J.P. Cody. Her second, The Pajama Game, was released a year later in March 2005 (Avon). The Pajama Game is a story about Moxie Brecker, an ex-science teacher gone lingerie store employee who is bored with her job and just about everything else. Moxie deals with an attractive repeat customer, disappointment, and depression, although the story remains humorous and enjoyable. Eugénie's third and most recent book, Love in the Time of Tafetta (Avon, March 2006), is about Iley Gilbert, who is a struggling photographer, and her encounter with her married boss, William.
