= Jenna Ushkowitz =

American actress and singer (born 1986)

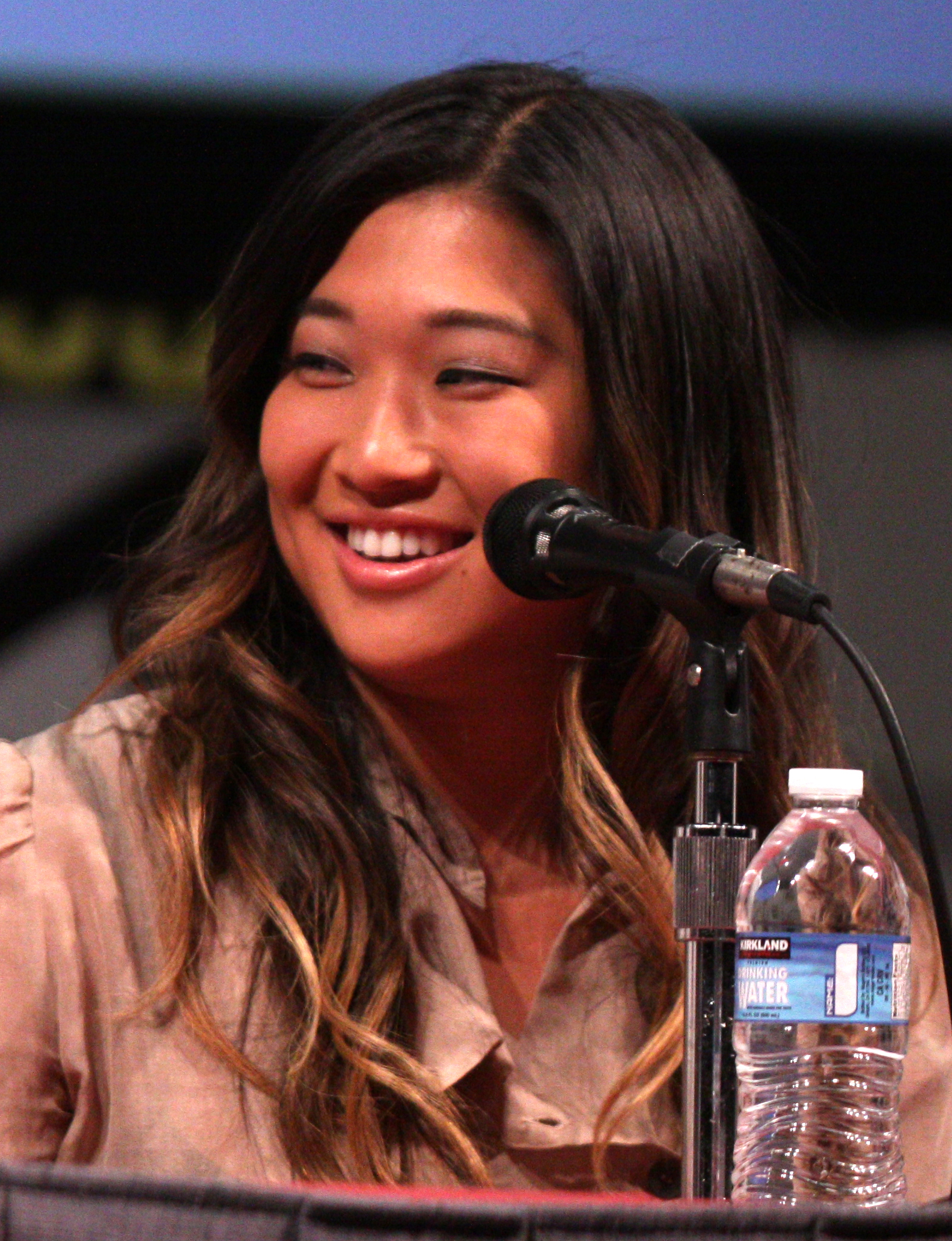
- Ushkowitz in 2011
- Born: April 28, 1986 (age 40); Seoul, South Korea
- Education: Marymount Manhattan College (BA)
- Occupations: Actress; singer; dancer; producer; podcaster
- Years active: 1989–present
- Spouse: David Stanley (m. 2021)
- Children: 2

Korean name
- Hangul: 민지
- RR: Minji
- MR: Minji

Jenna Noelle Ushkowitz (/ˈʌʃkəwɪts/; born April 28, 1986) is an American actress, singer, producer and podcast host. She is known for her performances in Broadway musicals such as The King and I and Waitress and in the role of Tina Cohen-Chang on the Fox musical comedy-drama series Glee, for which she received a Grammy Award nomination. She is a two-time Tony Award winner for her work as a producer of the Broadway musical Once on This Island and the Broadway play The Inheritance.

== Early life ==
Born in Seoul, South Korea, Ushkowitz was adopted at the age of four months and raised in East Meadow, New York. Ushkowitz's Korean given name is Min Jee (Korean: 민지). Her mother Judi was a secretary turned housewife, and her father Brad was in transportation-industry sales. She has an older brother, Gregg. Her immediate adoptive family is Catholic, her adoptive paternal grandfather was Jewish. She attended elementary school at the Parkway School in East Meadow, followed by Holy Trinity Diocesan High School, a Catholic school in Hicksville, Long Island. As a young child, she began her career in print advertisements, beginning with an ad for Playskool's Dress Me Up Ernie doll. She next did a Toys R Us television commercial, and went on to do three Burger King and Hess toy truck commercials each, and at ages 3, 6 and 11 did three Jell-O commercials starring comedian Bill Cosby. She also has been a regular child actor on Sesame Street for four years.

During high school, Ushkowitz appeared in numerous musicals, including the first high school production of Les Misérables. Her other roles included Penny in Honk!, Inez in The Baker's Wife, Little Red Riding Hood in Into the Woods, and Romaine Patterson in The Laramie Project. Ushkowitz graduated from high school in 2004 and moved on to attend Marymount Manhattan College, where she once again took the role of Little Red Riding Hood in Into the Woods. She graduated from Marymount Manhattan in 2007 with a Bachelor of Arts in theatre arts, with a concentration in performance and a minor in musical theatre.

== Career ==
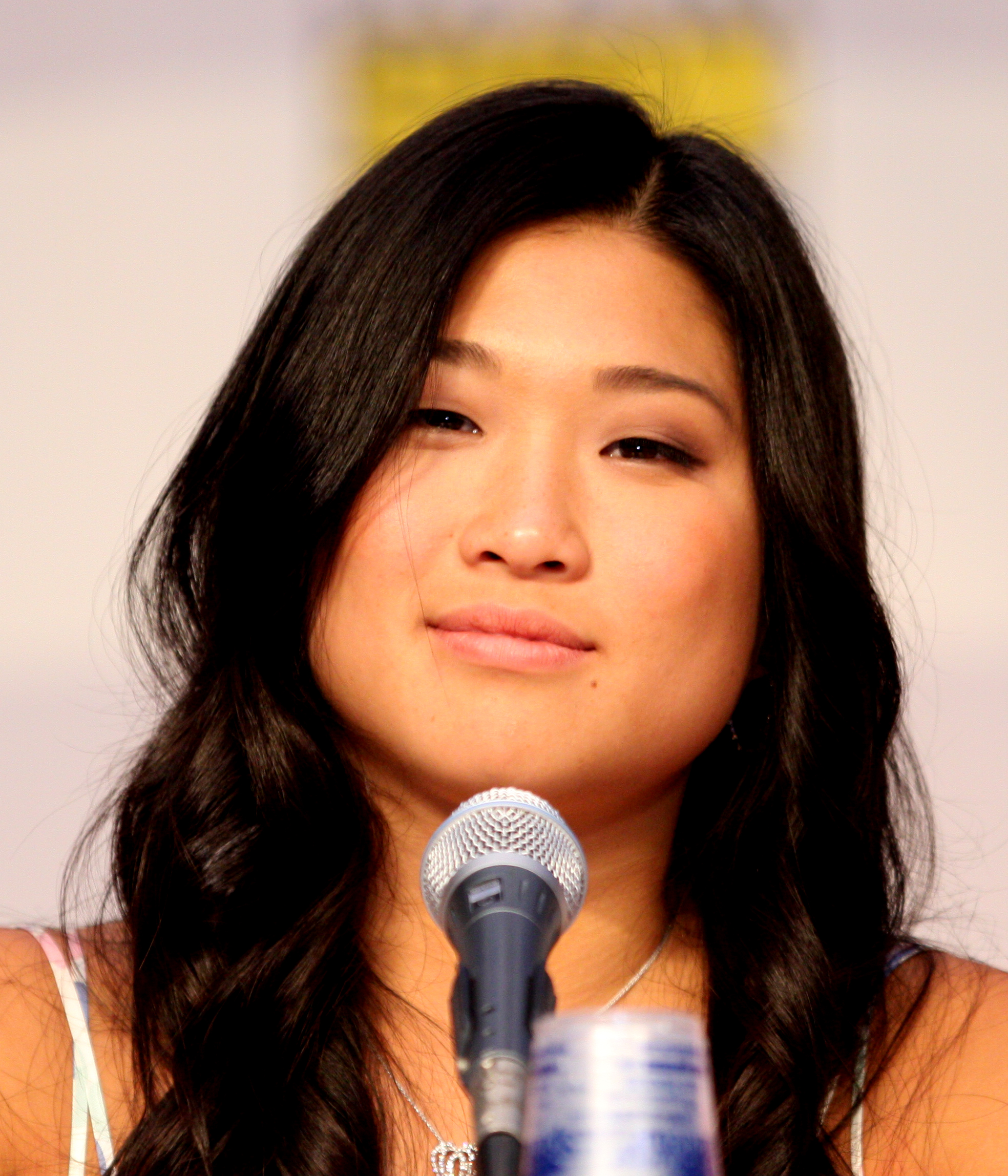
Ushkowitz at San Diego Comic-Con in 2010

At age 3, Ushkowitz began appearing on Sesame Street and other children's television shows. Her Broadway musical debut was in the 1996 revival of The King and I. Ushkowitz sang the American National Anthem at a New York Knicks game at Madison Square Garden when she was 13. Ushkowitz understudied the roles of Ilse, Anna, Martha, and Thea in the Broadway musical Spring Awakening in 2008. In 2009, Ushkowitz landed the role of Tina Cohen-Chang on Fox's musical comedy-drama series Glee. In casting Glee, series creator Ryan Murphy sought out actors who could identify with the rush of starring in theatrical roles. Instead of using traditional network casting calls, he spent three months on Broadway, where he found Ushkowitz.

Ushkowitz's solos have included the songs "True Colors" by Cyndi Lauper, "I Follow Rivers" by Lykke Li, "Because You Loved Me" by Celine Dion, "Gangnam Style" by PSY, "I Don't Know How to Love Him" from the musical Jesus Christ Superstar, "Hung Up" by Madonna, and "I Kissed a Girl" by Katy Perry. Raymund Flandez of The Wall Street Journal hailed the "True Colors" cover as showcasing Ushkowitz's "strong crystalline voice". Gerrick D. Kennedy, writing for the Los Angeles Times, wrote that the "poignant" rendition was one of his "feel-good, tearjerker moments". The version charted at number 47 on the Australian Singles Chart, 38 on the Canadian Hot 100, 15 on the Irish Singles Chart, 35 on the UK Singles Chart, and 66 on the Billboard Hot 100. Rolling Stone journalist Erica Futterman wrote that her "Because You Loved Me" performance "removes some of the Lite FM softness embedded in the tune" and added that it was "really is great to see Tina get a song that suits her vocal abilities".

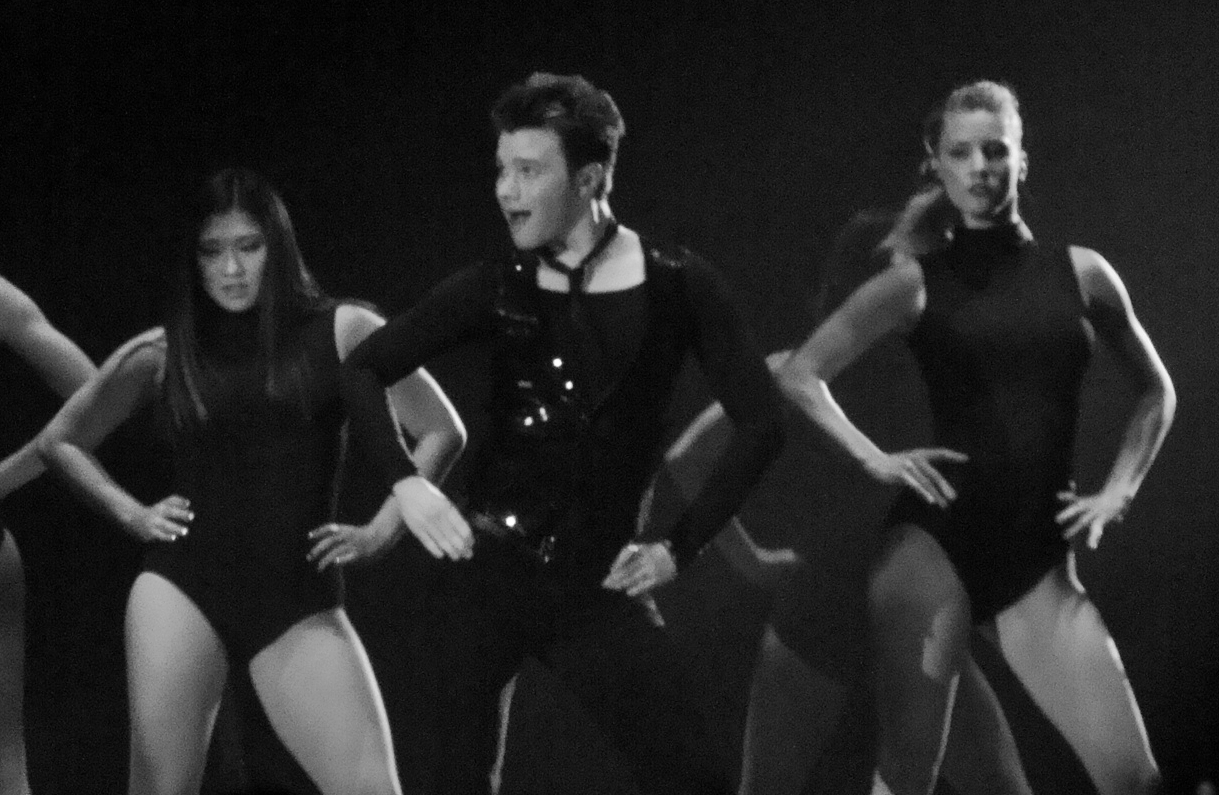
Ushkowitz, Chris Colfer and Heather Morris during a performance of Beyonce's "Single Ladies" on the tour Glee Live! In Concert! in 2011

In both 2010 and 2011, Ushkowitz embarked on live concert tours with her Glee co-stars, with performances taking place in the United States, Canada, England, and Ireland. In 2011, Ushkowitz appeared briefly in Lady Gaga's music video for "Marry the Night", playing the role of Gaga's friend. Ushkowitz's autobiography, Choosing Glee, was released on May 14, 2013. During Glee's fifth season, Ushkowitz's character graduated and was accepted into Brown University.

In August 2014, Ushkowitz was cast as Jeannie Ryan in the Hollywood Bowl production of Hair. Also in 2014, Ushkowitz was approached by fellow adoptee Samantha Futerman to found Kindred: The Foundation for Adoption, created to provide international and domestic adoptees and their families (both adoptive and biological) with services such as travel, translation, and support for those who wish to reunite. With the same spirit that made her create Kindred, in 2015, Ushkowitz executive produced the documentary Twinsters, a film showing the story that connected Samantha and Anaïs, identical twin sisters separated at birth. The film premiered at the 2015 South by Southwest. That same year, she was cast as the lead character, Julia Sullivan, in a special production of The Wedding Singer at the Pittsburgh Civic Light Opera. The play was initially set to last one week, but the positive response from critics and audiences extended its run.

In December 2015, it was announced that Ushkowitz had been cast as Marie the Nurse in the film adaptation of the musical Hello Again, alongside Nolan Gerard Funk, Audra McDonald, and Martha Plimpton. In 2016, Ushkowitz co-founded the podcast network At Will Radio with Will Malnati. The network debuted Infinitie Positivities, a show hosted by Ushkowitz that contains discussions of topics from her book Choosing Glee, and conversations with people who inspire her; guests include fellow actors, authors, and experts. In each episode, she talks about a new way to live life with a positive outlook.

Ushkowitz temporarily assumed the role of Dawn Williams from Kimiko Glenn in the Broadway production of Waitress, beginning performances July 29, 2016, and completing her run on October 19, 2016. She then appeared alongside Tracie Thoms and Rachel Dratch in Broadway's The 24 Hour Plays, with a performance on November 14, 2016. In 2018, she won a Tony Award for her role as a producer of that year's Best Revival of a Musical, Once on This Island. In 2020, she won a Tony Award for her role as a co-producer of that year's Best Play, The Inheritance.

In 2019, Ushkowitz and former Glee co-star Kevin McHale launched the podcast Showmance to discuss their on-screen and offline relationship. One of the most requested discussion topics of Season 1 of the podcast was their time on Glee. In season 2, they started an in-depth recap of Glee Season 1. Each episode of season 2 features McHale and Ushkowitz re-watching episodes of Glee, and sharing behind-the-scenes secrets while also sharing personal sentiments and reflections about filming. The podcast is part of the LadyGang network on PodcastOne. The podcast started an indefinite hiatus in July 2020 following the death of Naya Rivera.

In September 2022, McHale and Ushkowitz announced their new podcast endeavor And That's What You Really Missed on iHeartRadio. Their rebranded and reimagined Glee recap podcast will start at the beginning, recapping and sharing memories from all six seasons of the show.

== Activism and personal life ==
Besides her work with Kindred Foundation, Ushkowitz has advocated for several causes. In 2012, she posed with Glee co-star Kevin McHale for the NOH8 Campaign, supporting the repeal of Proposition 8 in California, which had previously banned same-sex marriages in the state. Ushkowitz has worked with NYCLASS and Oceana. A long time supporter of ocean conservation, Ushkowitz took a trip during summer of 2015 with Oceana to the Channel Islands, in order to raise awareness on the overfishing of forage fish and its effects on their survival. That same year, she hosted the 2015 Nautica Oceana Beach House event. She has made efforts to raise awareness about the declining population of sea lions in California, also caused by the overfishing of forage fish.

In August 2020, Ushkowitz announced her engagement to David Stanley. In May 2021, Ushkowitz celebrated her bachelorette party along with friend and Glee co-star Kevin McHale, who served as her "man of honor" during the ceremony. She and Stanley wed on July 24, 2021. On January 26, 2022, Ushkowitz announced on Instagram that she and Stanley are expecting their first child. In June 2022, she gave birth to their daughter, Emma. On June 28, 2024, Ushkowitz announced that she and her husband were expecting their second child. In November 2024, she gave birth to their son, Graham.

== Stage ==
=== As actress ===
Year	Title	Role	Notes
1996–1998	The King and I	Royal Child	Neil Simon Theatre
2008	Spring Awakening	Ensemble / Ilse Neumann	Eugene O'Neill Theatre
2014	Hair	Jeannie Ryan	Hollywood Bowl
2015	The Wedding Singer	Julia Sullivan	Pittsburgh Civic Light Opera
2016	Waitress	Dawn Williams	Lena Horne Theatre
2016	The 24 Hour Plays	Various	American Airlines Theatre

=== As producer ===
Year	Title	Role	Notes
2017	Once on This Island	Producer	2017 Broadway Revival
2019	Be More Chill	Producer	Broadway premiere
2019	The Inheritance	Co-producer	Broadway premiere

== Filmography ==
=== Television ===
As actress

Year	Title	Role	Notes	Ref.
2000	Little Bill	Basketball Girl	Episode: "The Promise/The Practice"	
2007	The Suite Life of Zack & Cody	Violin Player	Episode: "Orchestra"	
2009–2015	Glee	Tina Cohen-Chang	Main role (seasons 1–5); Recurring role (season 6); 106 episodes	
2022	RuPaul's Secret Celebrity Drag Race (season 2)	Milli von Sunshine	Episode 1: I'm Coming Out - First Time in Drag! Episode 2: Dance Your Padded Ass Off! Episode 3: Money, Honey; Episode 4: Drag Duet (6th Place)	
2022	Naked Mole Rat Gets Dressed: The Underground Rock Experience	Secret Service Mole		
2023–2024	Princess Power	Queen Ryung	9 episodes; voice role	

As herself

Year	Title	Role	Notes
2010	When I Was 17	Herself	Episode 32
2011	The Glee Project	Herself	Episode: "Believability"
2013	This Is How I Made It	Herself	Episode 10
2013	MasterChef	Herself	Episode: "Top 14 Compete"
2014–2015	Celebrity Name Game	Herself	6 episodes
2024	After Midnight	Herself	Episode 70

=== Film ===
Year	Title	Role	Notes
2001	Educated	Wendy	Short film
2011	Glee: The 3D Concert Movie	Tina Cohen-Chang	Concert film
2014	Twinsters	—	Executive producer
2017	Yellow Fever	Asia Bradford	
2017	Hello Again	Marie (The Nurse)	
2020	1 Night in San Diego	Hannah	
2020	The Right Girl	—	
2022	The Dinner Party	Cassidy	Short film; also director

=== Music videos ===
Year	Title	Artist(s)
2011	"Marry the Night"	Lady Gaga
2017	"Swish Swish"	Katy Perry featuring Nicki Minaj

== Awards and nominations ==
Year	Award	Category	Work	Result
2010	Screen Actors Guild Awards	Outstanding Performance by an Ensemble in a Comedy Series	Glee	Won
2010	TV Land Awards	Future Classics (with Glee cast)	Glee	Won
2010	Teen Choice Awards	Choice Music: Group (with Glee cast)	Glee	Nominated
2010	Lesbian/Bi People's Choice Awards	Favorite Music Duo or Group (with Glee cast)	Glee	Nominated
2010	Gay People's Choice Awards	Favorite Music Duo or Group (with Glee cast)	Glee	Won
2011	Screen Actors Guild Awards	Outstanding Performance by an Ensemble in a Comedy Series	Glee	Nominated
2011	Grammy Awards	Best Pop Performance by a Duo or Group with Vocals	Don't Stop Believin' (Note: Shared with Cory Monteith, Lea Michele, Chris Colfer, Kevin McHale, Amber Riley, Mark Salling and Naya Rivera)	Nominated
2011	Teen Choice Awards	Choice Music: Group (with Glee cast)	Glee	Nominated
2012	Screen Actors Guild Awards	Outstanding Performance by an Ensemble in a Comedy Series	Glee	Nominated
2013	Screen Actors Guild Awards	Outstanding Performance by an Ensemble in a Comedy Series	Glee	Nominated
2015	South by Southwest	Grand Jury Award for Documentary Feature	Twinsters	Nominated
2015	Los Angeles Asian Pacific Film Festival	Best Documentary Feature (Grand Jury Prize)	Twinsters	Won
2017	International Filmmaker Festival of World Cinema London	Best Lead Actress	Yellow Fever	Nominated
2018	Tony Awards	Best Revival of a Musical	Once On This Island	Won
2018	Drama Desk Awards	Outstanding Revival of a Musical	Once On This Island	Nominated
2019	Drama Desk Awards	Outstanding Musical	Be More Chill	Nominated
2020	Tony Awards	Best Play	The Inheritance	Won
2020	Drama Desk Awards	Outstanding Play	The Inheritance	Won
