= Jay Curtis (writer) =

American writer and film director (1950–2018)

- Born: Joseph Curtis; April 3, 1950; Jersey City, New Jersey, U.S.
- Died: January 25, 2018 (aged 67); San Diego, California, U.S.
- Occupations: Writer, poet, producer, actor, director
- Children: JT Curtis
- Writing career
- Period: 1979–2018
- Genres: Poetry, comedy
- Notable works: Disasterpiece Theatre, 75-0: The Documentary, In and Out of Dreaming, Flaws in the Road

Joseph "Jay" Curtis (April 5, 1950 – January 25, 2018) was an American author, producer, writer, director and actor. He won a Writers Guild of America award for "Outstanding script TV on-air promotion" in 2004. He is also known for being the creator, producer and star of the cult XETV program Disasterpiece Theatre, co-directing 75-0: The Documentary, and writing two books of poetry for Lexingford Publishing chronicling his battle with ALS.

== Early life and education ==
Jay Curtis grew up in Verona, New Jersey. He attended Verona High School, where he played football. During his three-year tenure as a player, the team never won a single game, even losing 75–0 to Madison High School in 1966. This lopsided loss, part of a 32-game losing streak, would eventually become the subject matter of the documentary Curtis co-directed with fellow student Venanzio Cortese, 75-0: The Documentary.

Curtis attended Montclair State University, studying English, and later New York University where he studied film. In 1976, he relocated to San Diego where he began working at XETV.

== Career ==
In 1980, Curtis and Bruce Mueller created the cult-XETV show Disasterpiece Theatre, where they presented the worst movies ever made (long before Mystery Science Theater 3000). Curtis hosted the show as "Sal U. Lloyd" and acted in skits to interrupt the show as well as displaying subtitles to comment on the movie. The show enjoyed a local following, and once beat Saturday Night Live in the ratings. Curtis' Sal U. Lloyd persona became a local celebrity.

Throughout the 1980s, Curtis freelanced in television, including producing sessions with the Promax Awards 'State of Our Art' sessions where he humorously predicted "The ability to interface video into the computer realm I think is going to change television. You can write that down." He also produced sessions with Siskel and Ebert.

In the 1990s, Curtis branded himself "The Creative Lifeguard" and became the on-air brand manager for CBS, producing and writing IDs, promos and marketing pieces that won over 40 PromaxBDA Awards. He also produced pieces for NFL, NCAA, Fox, NBC, ABC and others. In 2004, he received a Writers Guild of America Award for "Outstanding script TV on-air promotion".

== Later life ==
Curtis retired from television in 2011 and collaborated with his high-school friend Venanzio Cortese to produce a documentary about their losing football team. 75-0: The Documentary was a finalist in the New Jersey Film Festival, which called the film "a multi-layered documentary about the impact of winning and losing in youth sports." He also produced music videos for his son JT Curtis, including "Bootleg Gasoline" and "Home (Last Stand)", which were both featured on ReverbNation.

=== Poetry ===
Throughout his life, Curtis had written poetry as a hobby. In 2015, he was diagnosed with ALS (Lou Gehrig Disease) and chronicled the progression of his illness through a book of poems called In and Out of Dreaming, which was published by Lexingford Publishing LLC. In 2017, a second book was published, Flaws in the Road which chronicled many poems he had written over the years. Curtis finished the book by typing with one finger.

=== Death ===
On January 26, 2018, Curtis' son announced that he died from ALS the day before. He was 67. Producer Howard Barish said of Curtis: "He will be missed dearly by all."
