= This Is How I Made It =

2012–2013 American TV series

- Genre: Documentary
- Country of origin: United States
- Original language: English
- No. of seasons: 1
- No. of episodes: 12

Production
- Executive producers: Chris Williams; Dave Sirulnick; Jonathan Mussman; Ryan Kroft
- Running time: 21 minutes

Original release
- Network: MTV
- Release: October 13, 2012 – January 19, 2013

This Is How I Made It is an American reality-documentary television series on MTV. The series premiered on October 13, 2012. The series sheds light on the obstacles that various athletes, actors, artists and other celebrities overcame in order to become the person they are today.

== Episodes ==
No.	Title	Original release date
1	"Ashley Rickards and 2 Chainz"	October 13, 2012
2	"Mac Miller and Gabrielle Douglas"	October 20, 2012
3	"Chris Brown and Naya Rivera"	October 27, 2012
4	"Tyler Posey and Meek Mill"	November 10, 2012
5	"Flo Rida and Amber Riley"	November 17, 2012
6	"Demi Lovato and B.o.B"	December 1, 2012
7	"Big Sean & Karlie Kloss"	December 8, 2012
8	"Carly Rae Jepsen & Miguel"	December 22, 2012
9	"Wiz Khalifa & Jamie Lynn Sigler"	December 29, 2012
10	"Ciara & Jenna Ushkowitz"	January 12, 2013
11	"Joan Smalls & Afrojack"	January 19, 2013
12	"Ed Sheeran & Brandy"	January 19, 2013
