= Spark: A Burning Man Story =

- Directed by: Steve Brown and Jessie Deeter
- Produced by: Steve Brown (Ignite Channel) and Jessie Deeter
- Cinematography: John Behrens
- Edited by: Andrew Gersh
- Music by: Joachim Cooder
- Production company: Spark Pictures
- Distributed by: Filmbuff
- Release dates: August 1, 2013 (SXSW); August 16, 2013 (USA)
- Running time: 91 minutes
- Country: United States
- Language: English

Spark: A Burning Man Story is a 2013 independent documentary film with its world premiere at the South by Southwest film festival (SXSW) in Austin, Texas. That is about some 60,000 or so people that gather from around the world for a week at the annual Burning Man festival in Black Rock Desert of Nevada to collaborate building a temporary city that operates on a "gifting" economy where nothing is bought or sold. Participants bring in everything; food, water, and shelter. The week features large-scale art installations and partying, at the conclusion of the week a celebration in the ritual burning of a giant effigy, and after one week, take it all away.

The film also focuses on the individual artists and their dreams and struggles. The Burning Man organization is made up of 50 year-round staff and over 4,000 volunteers. Burning Man operates on ten principles or ideologies written by founder Larry Harvey.

== Awards ==
- Official Selection, Ashland Independent Film Festival, 2013
- Official Selection, Seattle International Film Festival, 2013

=== Critics reviews ===
The film has appeared in the following critics reviews:

Critic	Publication	Date
Hilary Armstrong	Huffington Post (San Francisco)	March 14, 2013
Lauren Musacchio	RollingStone (New York)	August 12, 2013
Geoff Berkshire	Variety (Los Angeles)	August 13, 2013
Andy Webster	New York Times (New York)	August 15, 2013
David Lewis	SFGate (San Francisco)	September 5, 2013
Zel McCarthy	Billboard (New York)	September 19, 2013

== Soundtrack ==
Disc 1

1. "Feel the Love" by Rudimental ft. John Newman
2. "Heroes" by Cazzette
3. "Coastal Brake" by Tycho
4. "The Event" by Marcus Andersson / Alex Talan
5. "Dubstep Dark" by Scoredraw
6. "Let it Fo" by Michael Franti / Spearhead
7. "We Ride" by Missy Higgins
8. "Man On Fire" by Edward Sharpe and the Magnetic Zeros
9. "Wave" by Crystal Fighters
10. "Going to the Desert" by Mathew Jonson / Damian Lazarus
11. "In My Mind" by Amanda Palmer
12. "Quietly Happy" by Scoredraw

Disc 2

1. "Flutes" [Sasha Remix] by Hot Chip
2. "Running" by The Scumfrog
3. "Let it Go" [Stanton Warriors Remix] by Michael Franti
4. "Time" by Pachanga Boys
5. "Summit" by Colombo
6. "Express Yourself" by Diplo
7. "One Type of Dark" [Ta-Ku Remix] by Ginger & the Ghost
8. "Man On Fire" [Adam Freeland Remix] by Edward Sharpe & the Magnetic Zeros
9. "Principles" by Benoit & Sergio
10. "Scorpion Frog" by Infected Mushroom
11. "Clubbing" by Colombo
12. "Promised Land" by Joe Smooth
