= Leila T. Bauman =

American female painter from the 19th century

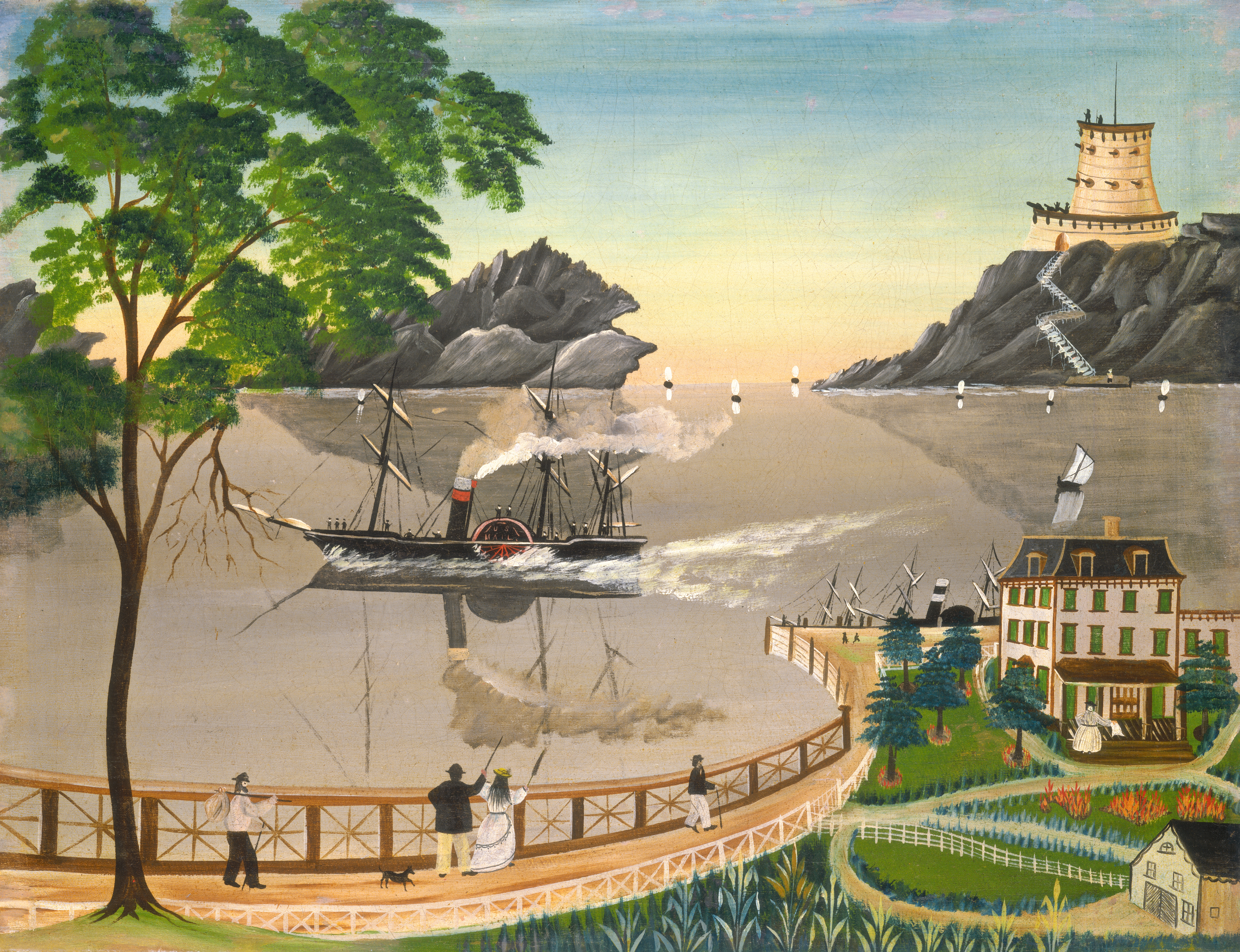
U.S. Mail Boat, n.d., oil on canvas, in the collection of the National Gallery of Art

Leila T. Bauman (active c. 1855–1870) was an American painter. Almost nothing is known of her life.

Bauman is known to have come from Verona, New Jersey, near Newark, but a search of genealogical and other records has as yet provided no further information about her life and career. It is possible that she worked for Currier and Ives at some point. Two oil-on-canvas river landscapes in the Edgar William and Bernice Chrysler Garbisch Collection in the National Gallery of Art are currently her only known paintings. One is titled Geese in Flight, and the other U.S. Mail Boat; internal evidence dates the two paintings to the 1850s, and suggests that they were inspired by views around the New York City area.

Geese in Flight was included in the inaugural exhibition of the National Museum of Women in the Arts, American Women Artists 1830–1930, in 1987.
