= Verona Public Schools =

School district in Essex County, New Jersey, US

Address
- 121 Fairview Avenue Verona, Essex County, New Jersey, 07044; United States
- Coordinates: 40.840756°N 74.248713°W

District information
- Grades: PreK-12
- Superintendent: Diane DiGiuseppe
- Business administrator: Jorge Cruz
- Schools: 6

Students and staff
- Enrollment: 2,211 (as of 2020–21)
- Faculty: 182.3 FTEs
- Student–teacher ratio: 12.1:1

Other information
- District Factor Group: I
- Website: veronaschools.org
Ind.	Per pupil	District spending	Rank (*)	K-12 average	%± vs. average
1A	Total Spending	$16,219	12	$18,891	−14.1%
1	Budgetary Cost	11,632	4	14,783	−21.3%
2	Classroom Instruction	6,776	4	8,763	−22.7%
6	Support Services	1,836	16	2,392	−23.2%
8	Administrative Cost	1,370	17	1,485	−7.7%
10	Operations & Maintenance	1,258	7	1,783	−29.4%
13	Extracurricular Activities	380	32	268	41.8%
16	Median Teacher Salary	64,128	38	64,043
Data from NJDoE 2014 Taxpayers' Guide to Education Spending. *Of K-12 districts with 1,800-3,500 students. Lowest spending=1; Highest=68

The Verona Public Schools is a comprehensive community public school district that serves students in pre-kindergarten through twelfth grade from Verona, in Essex County, in the U.S. state of New Jersey. The Verona Public Schools (VPS) consist of six campuses: four neighborhood elementary schools, one middle school, and one high school.

As of the 2020–21 school year, the district, comprising six schools, had an enrollment of 2,211 students and 182.3 classroom teachers (on an FTE basis), for a student–teacher ratio of 12.1:1.

The district is classified by the New Jersey Department of Education as being in District Factor Group "I", the second-highest of eight groupings. District Factor Groups organize districts statewide to allow comparison by common socioeconomic characteristics of the local districts. From lowest socioeconomic status to highest, the categories are A, B, CD, DE, FG, GH, I and J.

The schools provide students with a liberal education that meets and exceeds the New Jersey Core Curriculum Content Standards. With nearly 95% of Verona's graduates pursuing a college education, most curricular offerings are oriented to college preparation. Vocational programs and transitional services are offered through the schools of the Essex County Vocational Technical Schools for those planning on heading directly to the working world. The schools offer special education programs to support students with learning disabilities including one of the state's model pre-school intervention programs.

== Awards and recognition ==
For the 2004-05 school year, Laning Avenue School was named a "Star School" by the New Jersey Department of Education, the highest honor that a New Jersey school can achieve. Other schools in the district recognized as Star Schools are Verona High School for 1995-96 and Forest Avenue Elementary School for 1998-99.

The district has been recognized on three occasions with the Best Practice Award, honoring specific practices implemented by a district for exemplary and/or innovative strategies. Initiatives recognized include "Citizenship / Character Education: Teaching Responsibility Through Involvement" in 1997-98, "World Languages: Mandarin and Me" in 1998-99 and "Educational Technology: Rain Forest Robotics" in 2001-02.

== Schools ==
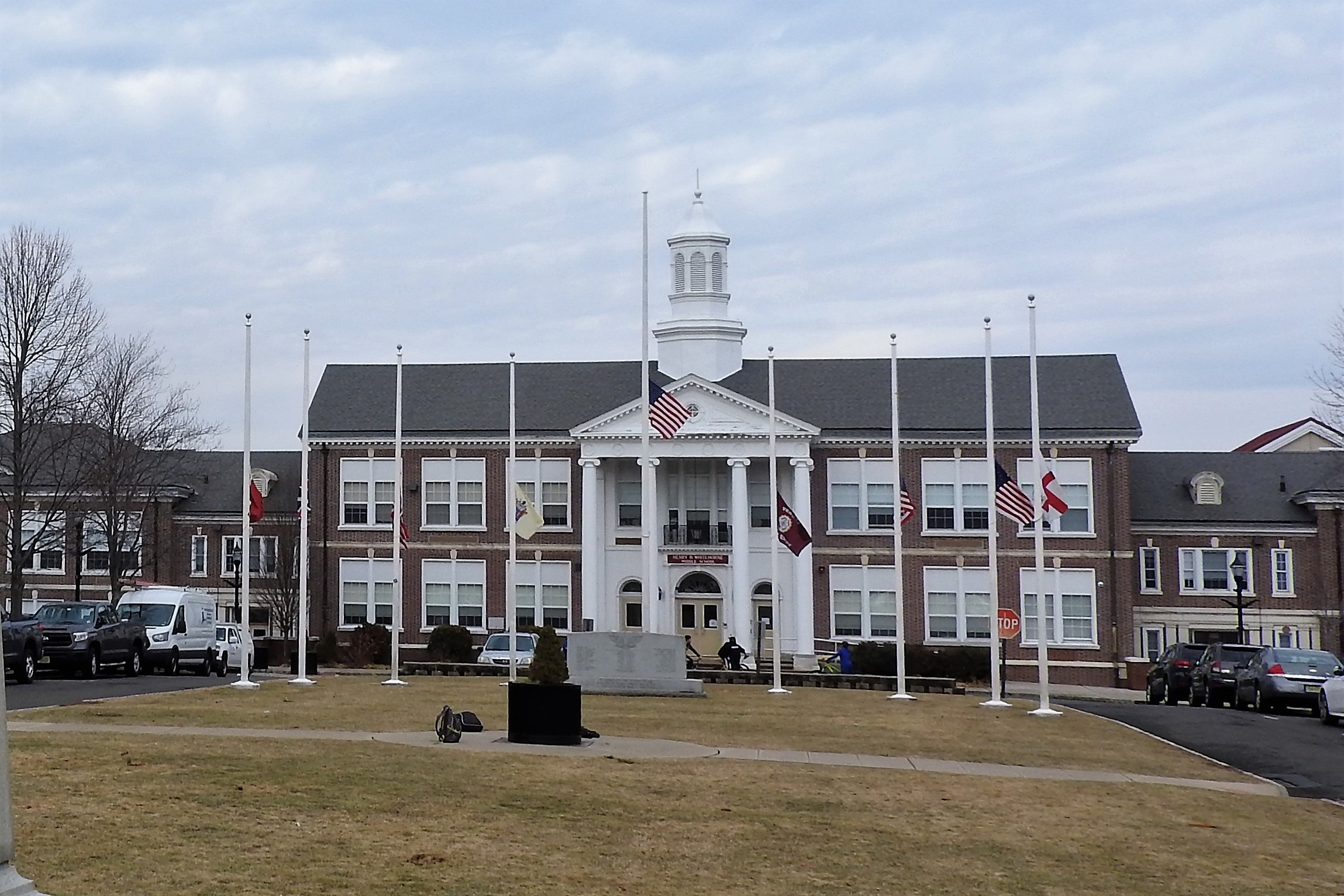
Middle School

Schools in the district (with 2020–21 enrollment data from the National Center for Education Statistics) are:

Elementary schools

- Brookdale Avenue School with 131 students in grades K-4
  - Nicole Stuto, principal
- Frederic N. Brown School with 274 students in grades K-4
  - Anthony Lanzo, principal
- Forest Avenue School with 213 students in grades K-4
  - Jeffrey Monacelli, principal
- Laning Avenue School with 233 students in grades PreK-4
  - Howard Freund, principal

Middle school

- Henry B. Whitehorne Middle School with 643 students in grades 5-8
  - David Galbierczyk, principal

High school

- Verona High School with 686 students in grades 9-12
  - Joshua Cogdill, principal

== Administration ==
Core members of the district's administration are:

- Diane DiGiuseppe, superintendent of schools
- Jorge Cruz, school business administrator and board secretary

== Board of education ==
The district's board of education, composed of five members, sets policy and oversees the fiscal and educational operation of the district through its administration. As a Type II school district, the board's trustees are elected directly by voters to serve three-year terms of office on a staggered basis, with either one or two seats up for election each year held (since 2012) as part of the November general election. The board appoints a superintendent to oversee the district's day-to-day operations and a business administrator to supervise the business functions of the district.
