= Dan DePalma =

American football player (born 1989)

No. 82
- Position: Wide receiver

Personal information
- Born: July 21, 1989 (age 37); Verona, New Jersey, U.S.
- Listed height: 5 ft 11 in (1.80 m)
- Listed weight: 200 lb (91 kg)

Career information
- College: West Chester
- NFL draft: 2011: undrafted

Career history
- New York Jets (2011)*; New York Giants (2011−2012)*; San Diego Chargers (2013)*; Saskatchewan Roughriders (2014)
- * Offseason or practice squad member only

Awards and highlights
- Super Bowl Champion (XLVI)
- Stats at Pro Football Reference

Dan DePalma (born July 21, 1989) is an American former professional football player who was a wide receiver in the National Football League (NFL). He played college football for West Chester Golden Rams and signed with the New York Jets as an undrafted free agent in 2011. He also played for the New York Giants, San Diego Chargers, and Saskatchewan Roughriders.

== Early life ==
DePalma played high school football at Verona High School in Verona, New Jersey. He attended West Chester University.

== Professional career ==
=== New York Jets ===
On July 27, 2011, DePalma was signed by the New York Jets as an undrafted free agent. He was released on September 3, 2011.

=== New York Giants ===
On September 7, 2011, DePalma signed to the New York Giants' practice squad. He re-signed with the Giants on February 8, 2012 and was waived on August 31. DePalma re-signed to the Giants’ practice squad on November 22, 2012.

=== San Diego Chargers ===
On April 8, 2013, DePalma was signed by the San Diego Chargers. On August 27, 2013, he was placed on the reserve/injured list. On August 31, 2013, he was waived with an injury settlement. On November 26, 2013, DePalma was signed to the Chargers' practice squad.

=== Saskatchewan Roughriders ===
DePalma signed with the Saskatchewan Roughriders in June 2014. He was released on June 21, 2014
