= Ignite Channel =

Independent film stufio

The Ignite Channel is an independent film studio in Woodside, California, which produces and distributes films about arts, culture, and innovation. The studio has produced and co-produced a number of award-winning documentaries, including Twinsters and Poached (2015). In 2015, Ignite acquired the distribution rights in North America of the movie Brand: A Second Coming by Ondi Timoner.

The studio is owned by the tech entrepreneur Steve Brown.

== Filmography ==
Year	Title
TBA	Dreams At Sea
2019	Chasing Einstein
2015	Twinsters
2015	Poached
2015	Sweet Micky For President
2014	Occupy the Farm
2013	Spark: A Burning Man Story
