= David Hoagland Slayback =

American politician

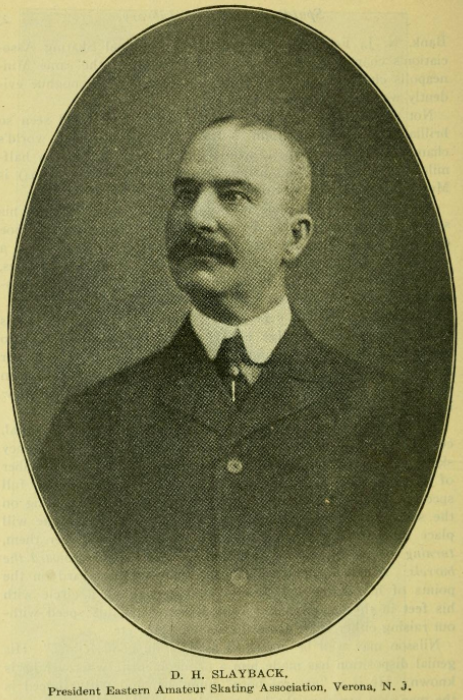

Mayor of Verona, New Jersey
- In office 1914–1942

Personal details
- Born: August 27, 1861 Hunterdon County, New Jersey
- Died: January 26, 1942 (aged 80) Montclair, New Jersey
- Spouse: Henrietta Grosch

David Hoagland Slayback I (August 27, 1861 – January 26, 1942) was the Mayor of Verona, New Jersey from 1914 to 1942, he served for 24 years. He was president of the Eastern Skating Association.

== Biography ==
He was born in Hunterdon County, New Jersey, on August 27, 1861, to William Slayback.

With his brother John H. Slayback he started an ice trade, later expanding into coal delivery.

In March 1893 he married Henrietta Grosch, the daughter of William Grosch. William Grosch was one of the first manufactures of bronze in the United States. The couple had children, including at least three daughters: Gertrude, Henrietta, and Linda. Gertrude was a schoolteacher.

He died on January 27, 1942, in Montclair, New Jersey.

== Ice skating ==
Slayback was active in early United States ice skating organizations. In 1902, Slayback was manager of champion ice skater, Peter Sinnerud. In 1907, Slayback was president of the National Skating Association. In that year, Slayback's group contended with the Amateur Athletic Union for control over the organization of skating. In March, the National Association dissolved and Slayback became president of the new, Eastern Skating Association under the umbrella of the International Skating Union of America. The dispute was resolved in favor of the Skating Association in December.

In early 1909, Slayback and other leaders in the Eastern Amateur Skating Association resigned in protest for the treatment of Edmund Lamy, whose victories at the International Speed Skating Championships was disqualified when he registered only with the Western Association but not the Eastern Association. The International Skating Union later supported Lamy, vindicating Slayback's position. In early 1910, the body itself dissolved a new Eastern Skating Association was formed with Slayback as president.

In 1916, Slayback was a member of the board of directors under chairman Louis Rubenstein and President Cornelius Fellowes when a similar dispute to the 1907 dispute with the AAU developed. In 1916, there was a question over whether the International Skating Union of America should have jurisdiction over the American Hockey League. Eventually, control of hockey was turned over to the Amateur Hockey League and the American National Hockey Association led by Roy Schooley.

== Politics ==
Slayback later entered politics. He headed the Verona Borough Council. In 1937 he defeated Stephen Bergdahl in the primary to run for Mayor of Verona, New Jersey.

On May 14, 1938, a Teaneck police officer was killed in a traffic accident, and on May 22, 1938, Slayback introduced a 20-mile-per-hour speed limit, enforced by ten policemen and fifteen deputies, so that "people [would] obey the law, and remember Verona." He even deployed a robot traffic patrolman "whose arms wave electrically and whose eyes doggedly follow any onlooker" to slow down speeders.
