= Disasterpiece Theatre =

US television program

- Genre: Comedy
- Created by: Jay Curtis; Bruce Mueller
- Presented by: Gary Cocker
- Music by: Fred Stern
- Countries of origin: United States; Mexico
- Original language: English

Disasterpiece Theatre was a comedy television program that aired in the early 1980s on XETV, a station in Tijuana, Mexico, owned by Mexican media company Grupo Televisa, which broadcasts in English across the border to neighboring San Diego, California. The show's title is both a play on the PBS anthology program Masterpiece Theatre and a reference to the low-budget, campy science fiction and horror films that were lampooned each week. At the time of Disasterpiece Theatre's run, XETV was an independent station; today it serves as the Tijuana affiliate of Canal 5.

== Summary ==
The premise of the show was simple: show the worst movies ever made and make fun of them. Among the films shown were Shriek of the Mutilated, Monster on Campus, The Thing That Couldn't Die, The Mummy's Hand, Born to Speed, Big Boy Rides Again, First Spaceship on Venus, and Curse of the Undead. Comments would be written as subtitles during the movie; for example, in Track of the Moonbeast a character says, "I'm somewhat of an...(laughs) an adventurer," and the word "IDIOT" appeared on screen during the pause in the middle of the sentence. Sometimes music would be added and, in some cases, redubbing by the writers would occur. On a showing of First Spaceship on Venus, the soundtrack was replaced by the writers' voices arguing about which television show they are going to watch, similar to the overdubbing idea in What's Up, Tiger Lily?

Jay Curtis hosted the show as Sal U. Lloyd, a play on the word celluloid. Bruce Mueller played "The Other Guy" and would often dress up as The Mummy, A Lion Tamer, and the Network Producer. Curtis and Mueller wrote and produced the show. Fred Stern was a constant contributor and served as the show's musical director. Stern chose popular music that was added to scenes for comic punctuation. As an example, during the film Beginning of the End, giant grasshoppers are attacking Chicago, scientists decide to use the grasshopper mating call to lure the creatures into Lake Michigan, but instead of the mating call coming from a boat loudspeaker, the audience hears "At the Hop" by Danny and the Juniors and the monsters hop in and drown. San Diego radio announcer Gary Cocker appeared on the show many times. Guests included Whoopi Goldberg, Richard Simmons, and J. Michael Straczynski. The show was done so cheaply, the producers would tape over the same reels, thus erasing the previous episode. In the show, Curtis and Mueller's microphone cords are easily visible, but it is the poor production quality that makes the show more humorous. In 1980 Sal U. Lloyd and The Other Guy hosted the first (and only) Disasterpiece Film Festival at the Ken Cinema in San Diego where "Robot Monster" and "Plan 9 From Outer Space" were shown to a capacity house.

Sal U. Lloyd was portrayed as a big loser who hates his job. In one episode, he explains his position: "I'm sick of television... I wanna be a rock and roll star. I wanna make some money." He is often seen receiving some kind of brain damage after showing a movie. Several times, Lloyd has a run-in with the network producer, George Mucas (obviously a parody of George Lucas), who hates the show. In reality, Curtis had a strong rivalry with the actual network producer of XETV, who eventually cancelled the show.

== After cancellation ==
In 2009, the creators of Disasterpiece Theatre created a YouTube page posting archival footage of the show.

Jay Curtis died on January 25, 2018, at the age of 67. He remained creative during his struggle with ALS continuing to write poetry and near the end typing with one finger.

Bruce Mueller aka "The Other Guy" remained at XETV for many years. He was murdered in 2021 while attempting to evict a transient living on family owned property in the rural Lyons Valley area of Eastern San Diego County.
