= Twinsters =

- Theatrical release poster
- Directed by: Samantha Futerman; Ryan Miyamoto
- Screenplay by: Samantha Futerman
- Starring: Anaïs Bordier; Samantha Futerman; Kanoa Goo
- Cinematography: Ryan Miyamoto
- Edited by: Jeff Consiglio
- Music by: Mark De Gli Antoni; Martin Molin
- Production companies: Small Package Films; Ignite Channel
- Distributed by: Netflix
- Release date: March 15, 2015 (South by Southwest 2015)
- Running time: 81 minutes
- Country: United States
- Language: English

Twinsters is a 2015 documentary film which covers the true-life story of identical twin sisters, separated at birth, discovering each other on-line, meeting, confirming their identity with a DNA test, and exploring aspects of their background together.

The film was released as a biography genre documentary on March 15, 2015, at South by Southwest. After that, the film was made available through various streaming platforms, including Netflix, iTunes and Freeform.

In September 2016, the network ABC bought a comedy based on the Twinsters documentary from the creators responsible for Funny or Die.

== Background ==
Anaïs Bordier is a French student studying in the UK. She is sitting on a London bus when a friend sends her a still picture from a YouTube video. She is amazed by the physical similarity of the American woman in the video to herself, but fails to find more information. Some weeks later, she receives the trailer of the film 21 & Over, which features the same woman. After some research, she finds that her doppelgänger is actress Samantha Futerman, who like her was born in South Korea and adopted as a baby. She is also shocked to find that they have the same date of birth, so she reaches out to her potential twin via Facebook.

== Plot ==
The film opens with Futerman explaining to the audience that she wants to share the crazy story that happened to her a few days previously. It introduces her family and explains that she received a friend request on Facebook from a stranger, and when she looks at the account's profile picture, she sees her own face looking back at her. She accepts the friend request, and receives a message from Bordier hinting strongly that they may be twins and asking her for more details of her birthplace. The two women then text back and forth and agree to speak to each other on Skype. After the two women experience their first video call, they can confirm that they do in fact bear a striking resemblance to each other, and from that point set out to prove whether they are sisters, and furthermore if they are in fact twins.

Futerman visits twin expert Dr. Nancy Segal and the two women take DNA samples together while using Skype. A trip to London is organized and using friends as buffers, the women finally meet. That evening, they both speak to Dr. Segal over Skype who confirms it is beyond doubt that they are identical twins. The film documents their further experiences, including Bordier's visit to Futerman in California, and the twins' subsequent trip to Seoul for the International Korean Adoptee Associations Conference. All along, they have pursued their birth mother, who denies having the twins. At the end, they compose a message to this woman, to thank her for giving them life.

== Impact ==
The movie premiered on March 15, 2015, at the South by Southwest Film Festival, where the film was well-received and got special jury recognition for its editing. The film was also met with praise at the Los Angeles Asian Pacific Film Festival in which the film then later received the recognition as the best documentary through the grand jury prize.

Following the success of the movie, the twins, Futerman and Bordier were able to publish a book, Separated @ Birth: A True Love Story of Twin Sisters Reunited, recounting their story and process of adapting to life with the knowledge of each other, as well as their experiences adjusting back to normal life after they parted ways. The book served to give some more minuscule details of the twins' conversations and life after meeting each other, and gave more context on their situation from the perspectives of each woman.

In the following years after the premiere of the movie, Futerman has served as an adoption advocate with Jenna Ushkowitz, a fellow actress known in the public to be a Korean adoptee and star of Glee. The two worked together to cofound a company dedicated to providing a resource online for adoptees to learn about options for travel, support, and translation, if they should choose to attempt to reunite with their birth families. The organization, Kindred: The Foundation for Adoption, aims to help adoptees with varying needs and issues, as well as their families, in trying to reconnect and reestablish their lives together.
