= Verona, New Jersey =

Township in Essex County, New Jersey, US

- Township
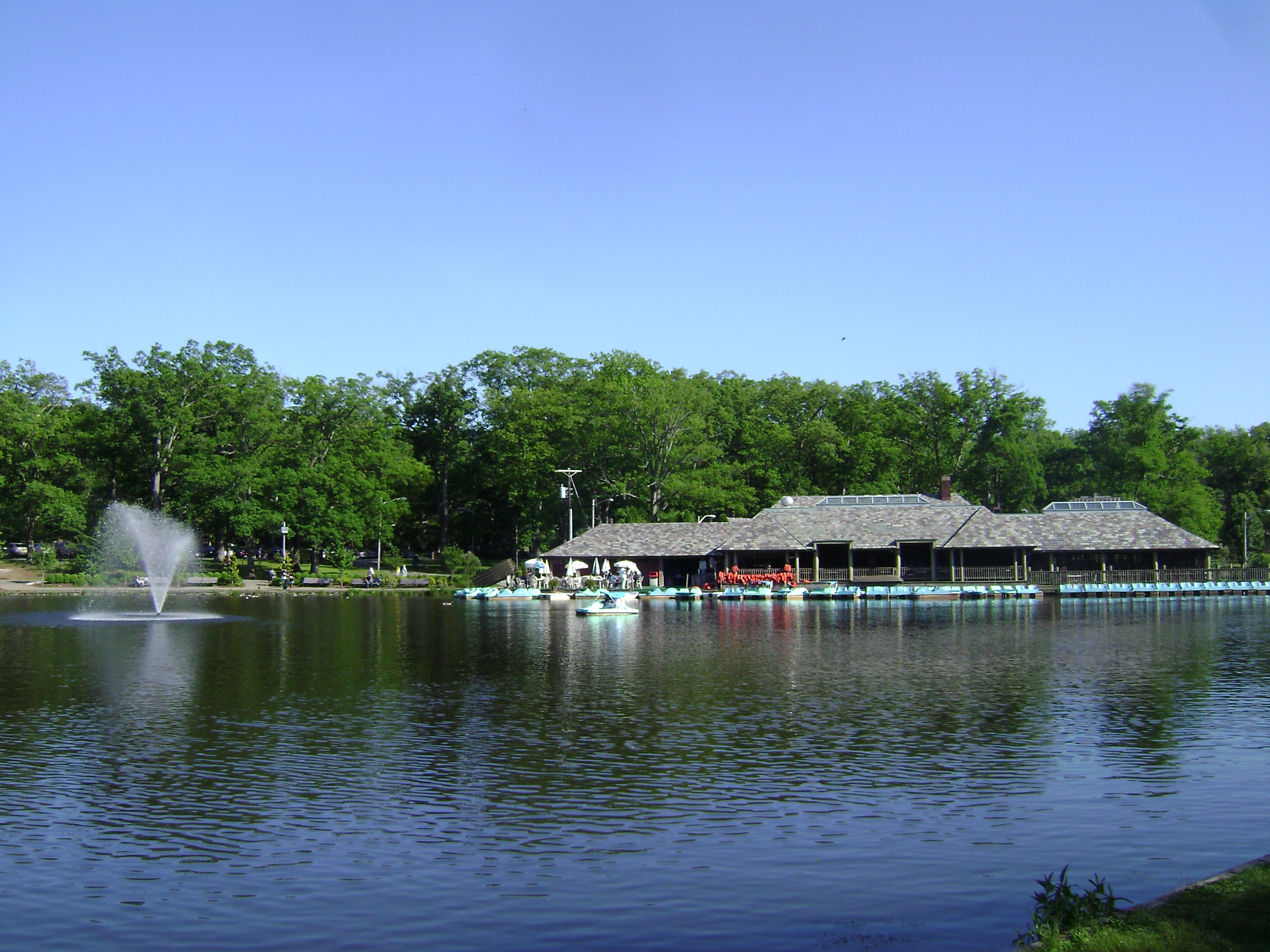
- The Verona Park Boathouse, viewed from the north-west shore of Verona Park Lake

- Flag Seal
- Interactive map of Verona, New Jersey
- Location in Essex County Location in New Jersey Location in the United States
- Coordinates: 40.832468°N 74.242863°W
- Country: United States
- State: New Jersey
- County: Essex
- Settled: 1702
- Incorporated: April 30, 1907
- Named for: Verona, Italy

Government
  - Type: Faulkner Act (council–manager)
  - Body: Township Council
  - Mayor: Christopher Tamburro (term ends January, 2028)
  - Manager: Kevin O'Sullivan
  - Clerk: Jennifer Kiernan

Area
  - Total: 2.81 sq mi (7.29 km^{2})
  - Land: 2.80 sq mi (7.24 km^{2})
  - Water: 0.019 sq mi (0.05 km^{2}) 0.74%
  - Rank: 353rd of 565 in state 18th of 22 in county
- Elevation: 335 ft (102 m)

Population (2020)
  - Total: 14,572
  - Estimate (2024): 14,779
  - Rank: 182nd of 565 in state 14th of 22 in county
  - Density: 5,215.5/sq mi (2,013.7/km^{2})
  - Rank: 110th of 565 in state 13th of 22 in county
- Time zone: UTC−05:00 (Eastern (EST))
  - Summer (DST): UTC−04:00 (Eastern (EDT))
- ZIP Code: 07044
- Area codes: 973/862 exchanges: 239, 571, 857
- FIPS code: 3401375815
- GNIS feature ID: 1729716
- Website: www.veronanj.org

Verona is a township in Essex County in the U.S. state of New Jersey. As of the 2020 United States census, the township's population was 14,572, an increase of 1,240 (+9.3%) from the 2010 census count of 13,332, which in turn reflected a decline of 201 (−1.5%) from the 13,533 counted in the 2000 census.

== History ==
Verona and several neighboring towns were all originally one consolidated area known as the Horseneck Tract.

=== 18th century ===
In 1702, a group of settlers left Newark and purchased a large tract of land northwest of their home city for the equivalent of a few hundred dollars from the Lenape Native Americans. This piece of land extended west and north to the Passaic River, south to the town center of what would become Livingston, and east to the First Watchung Mountain, and was called Horseneck by the natives because it resembled the neck and head of a horse. What was then known as Horseneck contained most of the present day northern Essex County towns: Verona, along with Caldwell, West Caldwell, Cedar Grove, Essex Fells, Fairfield, North Caldwell, and Roseland are all located entirely in Horseneck, and parts of what are today Livingston, Montclair, and West Orange also were contained in the Horseneck Tract.

After the Revolutionary War, the area of Horseneck was incorporated as "Caldwell Township" in honor of local war hero James Caldwell, a pastor who used pages from his church's bibles as wadding to ignite the ammo in soldiers' cannons and helped to drive the British out of Horseneck.

=== 19th century ===
In the 19th century, the area of present-day Verona was part of what was known as Vernon Valley. The name was rejected when residents applied to the United States Postal Service, as the name had already been in use for an area in Sussex County. Verona was chosen as the alternative name for the community. The township's name is derived from Verona, Italy.

At various times between 1798 and 1892, issues arose which caused conflict between the Caldwell and Verona areas. These included a desire of the citizens of Verona to more closely control their own governmental affairs. With the population growing, Verona residents wanted to centrally locate essential services such as schools and places of worship, as well as problems with the water supply; and the disposition of road repair funds.

On February 17, 1892, the citizens of Verona voted to secede from Caldwell Township to form Verona Township.

=== 20th century ===
Further growth and the need for a water system and other public utilities found Verona moving ahead of the other half of the township and in 1902 the two areas decided to separate into two separate municipalities: Verona Township and Verona Borough. It took two sessions of the state legislature to approve the new borough, but on April 18, 1907, the borough of Verona was approved by an act of the New Jersey Legislature, pending the results of a referendum held on April 30, 1907, in which the new borough passed by a 224–77 margin.

In 1907, residents of the newly formed borough had sought to disassociate themselves from the Overbrook County Insane Asylum and the Newark City Home, a reform school, and from the settlement of Cedar Grove, which was considered a settlement of farmers. On April 9, 1908, Verona Township changed its name to Cedar Grove Township.

In 1981, the borough was one of seven Essex County municipalities to pass a referendum to become a township, joining four municipalities that had already made the change, of what would ultimately be more than a dozen Essex County municipalities to reclassify themselves as townships in order take advantage of federal revenue sharing policies that allocated townships a greater share of government aid to municipalities on a per capita basis.

In 1976, Verona Borough received $213,000 in federal aid while similarly sized Cedar Grove Township received $1.24 million, suggesting financial benefits to structuring communities as townships as opposed to boroughs when possible. Today, Verona uses just "Township of Verona" in most official documents.

== Geography ==
According to the U.S. Census Bureau, the township had a total area of 2.82 square miles (7.29 km^{2}), including 2.79 square miles (7.24 km^{2}) of land and 0.02 square miles (0.05 km^{2}) of water (0.74%).

Unincorporated communities, localities and place names located partially or completely within the township include Hillcrest and Verona Lake.

The township is bordered by Cedar Grove Township, Essex Fells, Montclair Township, North Caldwell and West Orange Township. Verona lies between two mountains, the First and Second Watchung Mountains with a small river, the Peckman, flowing at the bottom of the valley towards the Passaic River at Little Falls.

=== Climate ===
Verona has a humid continental climate (Dfa), with warm/hot humid summers and moderately cold winters. The climate is slightly cooler overall than in New York City, especially at night, because there is no urban heat island effect, as well as higher elevation and a more interior location (greater distance away from the moderating effects of the Atlantic Ocean).

January tends to be the coldest month, with average high temperatures in the upper 30s (Fahrenheit) and lows in the lower 20s °F (-6 °C). July is the warmest months with high temperatures in the mid 80s °F (29-30 °C) and lows in the mid 60s °F (17-18 °C). From April to June and from September to early November, Verona enjoys temperatures from the lower 60s to upper 70s °F (16 to 25 °C). Rainfall is plentiful, with around 44 inches (1,100 mm) a year. Snowfall is common from December to March and nor'easters can bring significant amounts of snow. In January 1996, a weather station in nearby Newark, New Jersey, recorded over 31.8 inches (81 cm) of snow from the North American blizzard of 1996.

Climate data for Verona
Month	Jan	Feb	Mar	Apr	May	Jun	Jul	Aug	Sep	Oct	Nov	Dec	Year
Mean daily maximum °F (°C)	36 (2)	40 (4)	49 (9)	60 (16)	71 (22)	79 (26)	84 (29)	82 (28)	75 (24)	64 (18)	53 (12)	41 (5)	61 (16)
Mean daily minimum °F (°C)	19 (−7)	21 (−6)	29 (−2)	38 (3)	48 (9)	57 (14)	62 (17)	60 (16)	52 (11)	41 (5)	33 (1)	24 (−4)	40 (5)
Average precipitation inches (mm)	4.10 (104)	3.05 (77)	4.13 (105)	4.60 (117)	4.93 (125)	4.48 (114)	4.74 (120)	4.39 (112)	5.11 (130)	4.02 (102)	4.23 (107)	4.12 (105)	51.9 (1,320)

== Demographics ==
Historical population
Census	Pop.	Note	%±
1910	1,675		—
1920	3,039		81.4%
1930	7,161		135.6%
1940	8,957		25.1%
1950	10,921		21.9%
1960	13,782		26.2%
1970	15,067		9.3%
1980	14,166		−6.0%
1990	13,597		−4.0%
2000	13,533		−0.5%
2010	13,332		−1.5%
2020	14,556		9.2%
2024 (est.)	14,779		1.5%
Population sources: 1910–1920; 1910 1910–1930; 1940–2000 2000; 2010 2020

=== 2020 census ===
Verona township, Essex County, New Jersey – Racial and Ethnic Composition (NH = Non-Hispanic) Note: the US Census treats Hispanic/Latino as an ethnic category. This table excludes Latinos from the racial categories and assigns them to a separate category. Hispanics/Latinos may be of any race.
Race / Ethnicity	Pop 2010	Pop 2020	% 2010	% 2020
White alone (NH)	11,569	11,591	86.79%	79.54%
Black or African American alone (NH)	239	323	1.79%	2.22%
Native American or Alaska Native alone (NH)	2	11	0.02%	0.08%
Asian alone (NH)	535	696	4.01%	4.78%
Pacific Islander alone (NH)	1	2	0.01%	0.01%
Some Other Race alone (NH)	27	52	0.20%	0.36%
Mixed Race/Multi-Racial (NH)	164	466	1.23%	3.20%
Hispanic or Latino (any race)	795	1,431	5.96%	9.82%
Total	13,332	14,572	100.00%	100.00%

=== 2010 census ===
The 2010 United States census counted 13,332 people, 5,315 households, and 3,524 families in the township. The population density was 4,838.4 per square mile (1,868.1/km^{2}). There were 5,523 housing units at an average density of 2,004.4 per square mile (773.9/km^{2}). The racial makeup was 91.24% (12,164) White, 1.97% (262) Black or African American, 0.03% (4) Native American, 4.03% (537) Asian, 0.01% (1) Pacific Islander, 1.11% (148) from other races, and 1.62% (216) from two or more races. Hispanic or Latino of any race were 5.96% (795) of the population.

Of the 5,315 households, 30.5% had children under the age of 18; 56.1% were married couples living together; 7.6% had a female householder with no husband present and 33.7% were non-families. Of all households, 29.7% were made up of individuals and 15.9% had someone living alone who was 65 years of age or older. The average household size was 2.47 and the average family size was 3.12.

23.2% of the population were under the age of 18, 5.2% from 18 to 24, 23.1% from 25 to 44, 29.2% from 45 to 64, and 19.3% who were 65 years of age or older. The median age was 44.0 years. For every 100 females, the population had 89.1 males. For every 100 females ages 18 and older there were 86.0 males.

The Census Bureau's 2006–2010 American Community Survey showed that (in 2010 inflation-adjusted dollars) median household income was $93,839 (with a margin of error of +/− $6,753) and the median family income was $126,000 (+/− $9,193). Males had a median income of $71,917 (+/− $9,659) versus $52,433 (+/− $5,765) for females. The per capita income for the township was $47,689 (+/− $3,282). About 1.8% of families and 2.3% of the population were below the poverty line, including 0.7% of those under age 18 and 6.2% of those age 65 or over.

=== 2000 census ===
As of the 2000 United States census there were 13,533 people, 5,585 households, and 3,697 families residing in the township. The population density was 4,917.4 inhabitants per square mile (1,898.6/km^{2}). There were 5,719 housing units at an average density of 2,078.1 per square mile (802.4/km^{2}). The racial makeup of the township was 92.99% White, 1.53% African American, 0.02% Native American, 3.41% Asian, 0.06% Pacific Islander, 0.71% from other races, and 1.27% from two or more races. Hispanic or Latino of any race were 3.45% of the population.

There were 5,585 households, out of which 29.4% had children under the age of 18 living with them, 56.3% were married couples living together, 7.3% had a female householder with no husband present, and 33.8% were non-families. 30.0% of all households were made up of individuals, and 15.8% had someone living alone who was 65 years of age or older. The average household size was 2.42 and the average family size was 3.06.

In the township the population was spread out, with 22.5% under the age of 18, 4.3% from 18 to 24, 28.8% from 25 to 44, 25.1% from 45 to 64, and 19.3% who were 65 years of age or older. The median age was 41 years. For every 100 females, there were 89.1 males. For every 100 females age 18 and over, there were 83.8 males.

The median income for a household in the township was $74,619, and the median income for a family was $97,673. Males had a median income of $60,434 versus $43,196 for females. The per capita income for the township was $41,202, making it the eighth highest community in Essex County and 95th highest in the State of New Jersey. About 1.4% of families and 3.3% of the population were below the poverty line, including 2.6% of those under age 18 and 6.2% of those age 65 or over.

== Economy ==
Annin & Co., the world's oldest and largest flag manufacturer, had its main manufacturing plant in Verona from 1916 to 2013. The building was sold and redeveloped as apartments, which opened to tenants in 2018. Annin is the official flag manufacturer to the United Nations, and a major supplier to the United States Government. Annin produced flags that were used on Iwo Jima, at the North and South Poles, atop Mount Everest and the rubble of the World Trade Center.

Annin's Verona factory also produced 186 stick flags that were carried to the Moon in the Apollo 11 lunar lander and later distributed as mementos of the first Moon landing. Annin does not claim that the flag planted on the Moon was produced by Annin, either in Verona or at a company plant in Bloomfield, although the company's president says that it has been assured by multiple sources that it was. The stars sections of all Annin flags were produced in Verona then. Annin President Carter Beard said that uniforms of the Apollo 11 astronauts were decorated with a silk-screened patch that may have been produced in Verona.

== Parks and recreation ==
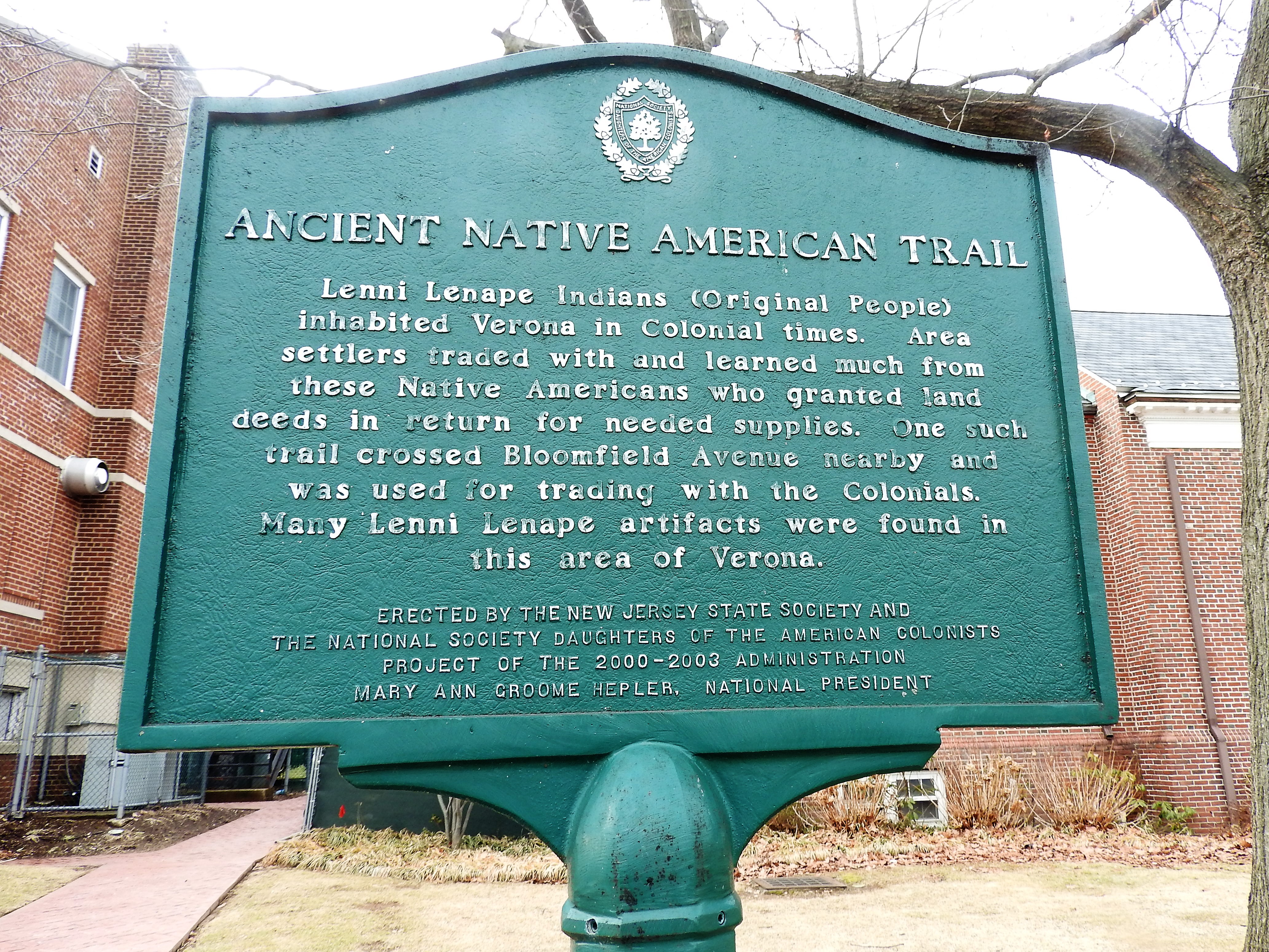
A Lenape Trail sign

- Eagle Rock Reservation, a 408.33 acres (1.6525 km^{2}) forest reserve and recreational park. Most of this reservation is in West Orange or in Montclair.
- Everett Field, a small park with baseball and football fields dedicated to the family of Fillmore Condit. who donated the land to the township in memory of his son Everett.
- Hilltop Reservation, opened in spring 2003, includes the grounds of the former Essex Mountain Sanatorium, is home to many hiking and mountain biking trails.
- Kip's Castle Park, the newest park to the Essex County Park System, features a castle-style mansion with large carriage house on 10.5 acres (42,000 m^{2}).
- Verona Park, the fifth-largest in the Essex County Park System, it was designed by the same designer as Central Park in New York City.
- Lenape Trail, a trail that runs from the Pulaski Skyway in Newark to the Passaic River in Roseland. The Verona section runs from the West Essex Trail, down and through Verona Park, and up toward Eagle Rock Reservation before entering West Orange.
- Verona Community Center, built in 1997, provides a gym, game room, ballroom, and conference room for any group or organization. also adjacent are:
  - Veteran's Field, a grass turf field, provides two softball/baseball fields as well as an athletic field
  - Centennial Field, an artificial turf field, opened in 2007.
  - Liberty Field, an artificial turf field, opened in 2015.
  - Freedom Field, an artificial turf field, opened in 2016.
- Verona Pool, features an Olympic-size swimming pool of various depths, with two water slides and two springboards, as well as a wading pool for younger children; playground, volleyball, basketball, racquetball and shuffleboard courts, in addition to ping-pong tables, full showers and a snackbar
- West Essex Trail, acquired in 1985 through Green Acres funding, is a 2.84-mile (4.57 km) trail which runs from Arnold Way in Verona to the Passaic County line near the Lenape Trail, on the former right-of-way of the Caldwell Branch of the old Erie Lackawanna Railroad.

== Government ==
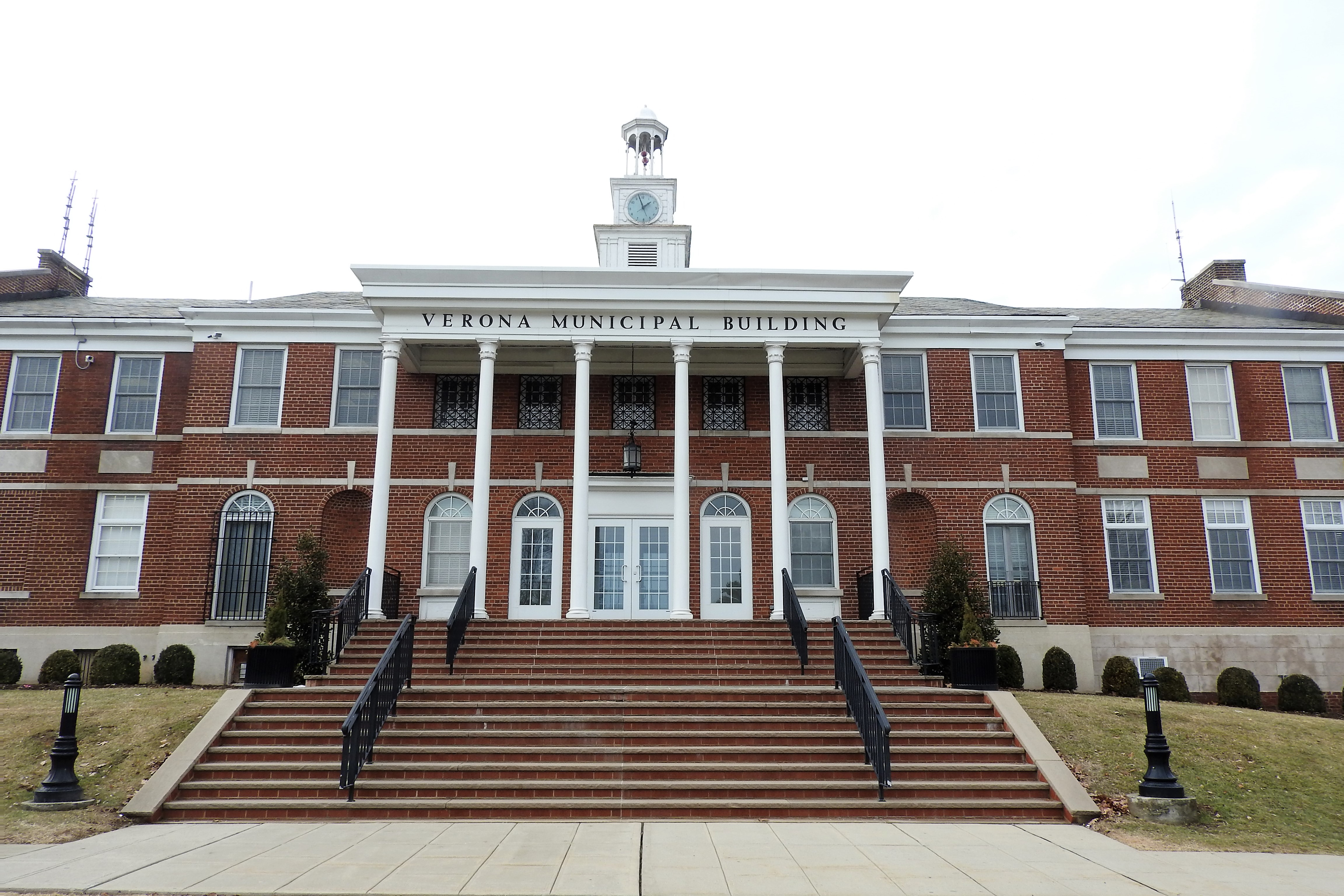
Township of Verona Municipal Building

=== Local government ===
Verona operates within the Faulkner Act, formally known as the Optional Municipal Charter Law, under the Council-Manager form of New Jersey municipal government. The township is one of 42 municipalities (of the 564) statewide that use this form of government. The governing body is comprised of the five-member Township Council, who are elected at-large on a non-partisan basis to staggered four-year terms of office, with either two or three seats coming up for election in odd-numbered years as part of the November municipal election. At a reorganization meeting held between January 14 and January 21 after each election, the council selects a mayor and deputy mayor from among its members.

As of 2025, the members of the Verona Township Council are Mayor Christopher Tamburro (term on council expires January, 2030 and as mayor ends January, 2028), Deputy Mayor Jack McEvoy (term on council expires January, 2030 and as deputy mayor ends January, 2028), Cynthia Holland (January, 2030), Christine McGrath (January 2028) and Alex Roman (January, 2028).

The day-to-day operations of the township are supervised by Township Manager Kevin O'Sullivan, who has served as chief executive officer since taking office in February 2025.

=== Federal, state, and county representation ===
Verona is located in the 10th Congressional District and is part of New Jersey's 40th state legislative district.

For the 119th United States Congress, New Jersey's 10th congressional district is represented by LaMonica McIver (D, Newark). New Jersey is represented in the United States Senate by Democrats Cory Booker (Newark, term ends 2027) and Andy Kim (Moorestown, term ends 2031).

For the 2026–2027 session, the 40th legislative district of the New Jersey Legislature is represented in the State Senate by Kristin Corrado (R, Totowa) and in the General Assembly by Al Barlas (R, Cedar Grove) and Christopher DePhillips (R, Wyckoff).

Essex County is governed by a directly elected county executive, with legislative functions performed by the Board of County Commissioners. As of 2025, the County Executive is Joseph N. DiVincenzo Jr. (D, Roseland), whose four-year term of office ends December 31, 2026. The county's Board of County Commissioners is composed of nine members, five of whom are elected from districts and four of whom are elected on an at-large basis. They are elected for three-year concurrent terms and may be re-elected to successive terms at the annual election in November. Essex County's Commissioners are:

Robert Mercado (D, District 1 – Newark's North and East Wards, parts of Central and West Wards; Newark, 2026), A'Dorian Murray-Thomas (D, District 2 – Irvington, Maplewood and parts of Newark's South and West Wards; Newark, 2026), Vice President Tyshammie L. Cooper (D, District 3 - Newark: West and Central Wards; East Orange, Orange and South Orange; East Orange, 2026), Leonard M. Luciano (D, District 4 – Caldwell, Cedar Grove, Essex Fells, Fairfield, Livingston, Millburn, North Caldwell, Roseland, Verona, West Caldwell and West Orange; West Caldwell, 2026), President Carlos M. Pomares (D, District 5 – Belleville, Bloomfield, Glen Ridge, Montclair and Nutley; Bloomfield, 2026), Brendan W. Gill (D, at large; Montclair, 2026), Romaine Graham (D, at large; Irvington, 2026), Wayne Richardson (D, at large; Newark, 2026), Patricia Sebold (D, at-large; Livingston, 2026).

Constitutional officers elected countywide are: Clerk Christopher J. Durkin (D, West Caldwell, 2025), Register of Deeds Juan M. Rivera Jr. (D, Newark, 2029), Sheriff Amir Jones (D, Newark, 2027), and Surrogate Alturrick Kenney (D, Newark, 2028).

=== Politics ===
As of March 2011, there were a total of 9,911 registered voters in Verona, of which 3,194 (32.2%) were registered as Democrats, 2,329 (23.5%) were registered as Republicans and 4,387 (44.3%) were registered as Unaffiliated. There were no voters registered as Libertarians or Greens.

United States presidential election results for Verona
Year	Republican		Democratic		Third party(ies)	
Year	No.	%	No.	%	No.	%
2024	3,663	41.03%	5,137	57.54%	127	1.42%
2020	3,693	39.64%	5,507	59.11%	117	1.26%
2016	3,480	43.77%	4,199	52.81%	272	3.42%
2012	3,563	48.90%	3,662	50.26%	61	0.84%
2008	3,730	50.06%	3,664	49.17%	57	0.76%
2004	3,900	51.56%	3,597	47.55%	67	0.89%

In the 2012 presidential election, Democrat Barack Obama received 50.3% of the vote (3,662 cast), ahead of Republican Mitt Romney with 48.9% (3,563 votes), and other candidates with 0.8% (61 votes), among the 7,366 ballots cast by the township's 10,396 registered voters (80 ballots were spoiled), for a turnout of 70.9%. In the 2008 presidential election, Republican John McCain received 49.6% of the vote (3,730 cast), ahead of Democrat Barack Obama with 48.8% (3,664 votes) and other candidates with 0.8% (57 votes), among the 7,515 ballots cast by the township's 9,750 registered voters, for a turnout of 77.1%. In the 2004 presidential election, Republican George W. Bush received 51.4% of the vote (3,900 ballots cast), outpolling Democrat John Kerry with 47.4% (3,597 votes) and other candidates with 0.7% (67 votes), among the 7,587 ballots cast by the township's 9,697 registered voters, for a turnout percentage of 78.2.

Gubernatorial election results for Verona
Year	Republican		Democratic		Third party(ies)	
Year	No.	%	No.	%	No.	%
2025	2,953	39.11%	4,569	60.51%	29	0.38%
2021	2,636	44.21%	3,293	55.23%	33	0.55%
2017	1,750	37.70%	2,747	59.18%	145	3.12%
2013	2,645	59.19%	1,768	39.56%	56	1.25%
2009	2,521	49.35%	2,062	40.37%	525	10.28%
2005	2,329	47.28%	2,477	50.28%	120	2.44%

In the 2013 gubernatorial election, Republican Chris Christie received 59.2% of the vote (2,645 cast), ahead of Democrat Barbara Buono with 39.6% (1,768 votes), and other candidates with 1.3% (56 votes), among the 4,527 ballots cast by the township's 10,442 registered voters (58 ballots were spoiled), for a turnout of 43.4%. In the 2009 gubernatorial election, Republican Chris Christie received 49.1% of the vote (2,521 ballots cast), ahead of Democrat Jon Corzine with 40.1% (2,062 votes), Independent Chris Daggett with 9.4% (482 votes) and other candidates with 0.8% (43 votes), among the 5,137 ballots cast by the township's 9,738 registered voters, yielding a 52.8% turnout.

United States Senate election results for Verona1
Year	Republican		Democratic		Third party(ies)	
Year	No.	%	No.	%	No.	%
2024	3,522	40.63%	5,018	57.88%	129	1.49%
2018	2,730	44.92%	3,144	51.74%	203	3.34%
2012	2,943	45.73%	3,359	52.20%	133	2.07%
2006	2,300	48.37%	2,372	49.88%	83	1.75%

United States Senate election results for Verona2
Year	Republican		Democratic		Third party(ies)	
Year	No.	%	No.	%	No.	%
2020	3,672	40.80%	5,239	58.21%	89	0.99%
2014	1,717	45.29%	2,025	53.42%	49	1.29%
2013	1,387	45.52%	1,631	53.53%	29	0.95%
2008	3,204	49.05%	3,214	49.20%	114	1.75%

=== Current and previous mayors ===
Current and Previous Mayors of Verona, New Jersey

Mayor	Term start	Term end	Notes
Jack McEvoy	7/2019	6/2021	Jack McEvoy is the current mayor of Verona, New Jersey
Kevin J. Ryan	7/2015	6/2019	
Robert Manley	7/2013	6/2015	
Frank J. Sapienza	7/2011	6/2013	
Teena Schwartz	7/2009	6/2011	
Kenneth McKenna	7/2007	6/2009	
Jay H. Sniatkowski (born 1964)	7/2005	6/2007	He was a four-term member of the Verona city council. He is a member of the Republican Party and serves as chairman of the Verona Republican Party and is an Essex County Republican Party committee member. Sniatkowski graduated from Seton Hall University, where he was a member of the baseball team.
Robert R. Detore	7/2001	6/2005	
Maria T. Force	7/1999	6/2001	
Matthew J. Kirnan	7/1997	6/1999	Disbarred attorney sentenced to seven years in 2012 for stealing $750,000 from three clients
Nicholas M. Rolli	1/1995	6/1997	
James William Treffinger (born 1950)	7/1993	12/1994	Republican Party politician who served as County Executive of Essex County, New Jersey, from 1995 to 2003. He pleaded guilty to federal charges of obstruction of justice and mail fraud in 2003.
Nicholas M. Rolli	7/1991	6/1993	
Robert Pignatello	7/1989	6/1991	
Nicholas M. Rolli	7/1987	6/1989	
James William Treffinger (born 1950)	1984	6/1987	
Frank Albright (D)	1980	1983	
Jerome D. Greco (D)	1976	1979	
Walter D. McKinley (R)	1968	1975	
Robert B. Howe (R)	1962	1967	
Willard E. Dodd (R)	1948	1961	
William A. Hugget (R)	1943	1947	
Alexander P. Waugh (R)	1942	1942	He was born in Caldwell, New Jersey, on August 24, 1907, and attended Caldwell Public Schools. He graduated from Columbia College and Mercer Beasley Law School (now Rutgers School of Law). He served in the New Jersey General Assembly from 1933 to 1934. He held the office of Magistrate of Verona from 1934 to 1937 and later as Verona City Councilman and Mayor of Verona, New Jersey. He served as a judge for the Essex County District Court from 1948 to 1953, and a judge for the Essex County, New Jersey, system from 1953 to 1956.
David Hoagland Slayback (R) (1861–1942)	1924	1941	He was the mayor of Verona, New Jersey, for 24 years. He was born in Hunterdon County, New Jersey, on August 27, 1861, to William Slayback. With his brother John H. Slayback he started an ice trade, later expanding into coal delivery. In March 1893 he married Henrietta Grosch, the daughter of William Grosch. William Grosch was one of the first manufactures of bronze in the United States. In 1937 he defeated Stephen Bergdahl in the primary to run for Mayor of Verona, New Jersey. On May 14, 1938, a Teaneck police officer was killed in a traffic accident, and on May 22, 1938, he introduced a 20-mile per hour speed limit, enforced by ten policemen and fifteen deputies, so that "people [would] obey the law, and remember Verona." He even deployed a robot traffic patrolman "whose arms wave electrically and whose eyes doggedly follow any onlooker" to slow down speeders.
Ralph M. North (R)	1922	1923	
Charles W. Brower (R)	1920	1921	
David Hoagland Slayback (R) (1861–1942)	1914	1919	He was the mayor of Verona, New Jersey, for 24 years. He was born in Hunterdon County, New Jersey, on August 27, 1861, to William Slayback. With his brother John H. Slayback he started an ice trade, later expanding into coal delivery. In March 1893 he married Henrietta Grosch, the daughter of William Grosch. William Grosch was one of the first manufactures of bronze in the United States. In 1937 he defeated Stephen Bergdahl in the primary to run for Mayor of Verona, New Jersey. On May 14, 1938, a Teaneck police officer was killed in a traffic accident, and on May 22, 1938, he introduced a 20-mile per hour speed limit, enforced by ten policemen and fifteen deputies, so that "people [would] obey the law, and remember Verona." He even deployed a robot traffic patrolman "whose arms wave electrically and whose eyes doggedly follow any onlooker" to slow down speeders.
Carl Mau (D)	1912	1913	
John R. Pratt (R)	November 2, 1909	1911	He was a Republican.
Robert Palm (R)	1908	1909	

== Education ==
=== Public schools ===
The Verona Public Schools is the public school district in Verona, which serves students in pre-kindergarten through twelfth grade. The district has six campuses: four neighborhood elementary schools, one middle school and one high school. As of the 2020–21 school year, the district, comprised of six schools, had an enrollment of 2,211 students and 182.3 classroom teachers (on an FTE basis), for a student–teacher ratio of 12.1:1. Schools in the district (with 2020–21 enrollment data from the National Center for Education Statistics) are Brookdale Avenue School with 131 students in grades K–4, Frederic N. Brown School with 274 students in grades K–4, Forest Avenue School with 213 students in grades K–4, Laning Avenue School with 233 students in grades Pre-K–4, Henry B. Whitehorne Middle School with 643 students in grades 5–8, and Verona High School with 686 students in grades 9–12.

The high school mascot is the "Hillbilly". However, this mascot has become controversial as a result of opposition from previous school Superintendent Earl Kim. In the face of community support for the traditional name, the mascot was retained. The original mascot was depicted with a rifle and jug of moonshine. The rifle and jug and have been replaced with a fishing pole and a dog.

The district has been recognized on three occasions with the Best Practice Award, honoring specific practices implemented by a district for exemplary and/or innovative strategies. In addition, three schools in the district was named a "Star School" by the New Jersey Department of Education, the highest honor that a New Jersey school can achieve. The school was the 70th-ranked public high school in New Jersey out of 328 schools statewide in New Jersey Monthly magazine's September 2012 cover story on the state's "Top Public High Schools", after being ranked 53rd in 2010 out of 322 schools listed.

In 2020, Verona High School was the 31st-ranked public high school in New Jersey out of 305 schools statewide.

=== Private schools ===
Founded in 1924 and located near Verona Park, Our Lady of the Lake Catholic School serves students in pre-school through eighth grade, operating under the auspices of the Roman Catholic Archdiocese of Newark. The school was recognized by the National Blue Ribbon Schools Program in 2011, one of 305 schools recognized nationwide and one of 14 selected from New Jersey. The school was honored a second time when it was one of eight private schools recognized in 2017 as an Exemplary High Performing School by the Blue Ribbon Schools Program of the United States Department of Education.

Academy360 Lower school, a school run by Spectrum360, is a private non-profit school approved by the New Jersey Department of Education, which serves children ages 3–21 who face learning, language and social challenges. Dating back to an orphanage founded in 1883 in Newark, New Jersey, the school moved to Verona in 1999 after remodeling a building that had been donated by Hoffmann-LaRoche. The name of the school was changed from "The Children's Institute" in the fall of 2016.

== Transportation ==
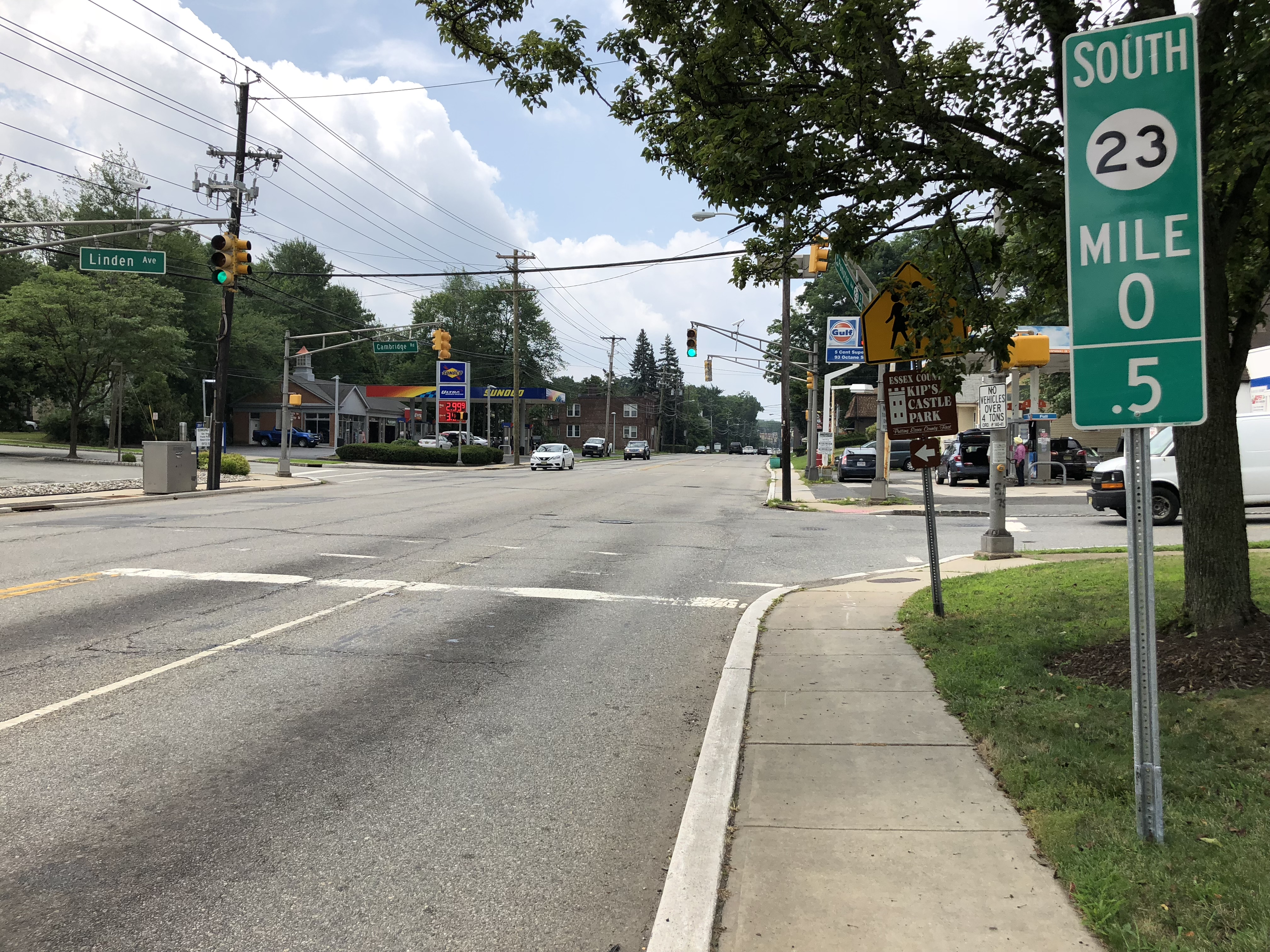
Route 23 southbound in Verona

=== Roads and highways ===
As of May 2010, the township had a total of 37.83 miles (60.88 km) of roadways, of which 31.88 miles (51.31 km) were maintained by the municipality, 5.23 miles (8.42 km) by Essex County and 0.72 miles (1.16 km) by the New Jersey Department of Transportation.

Major roadways in Verona include Route 23 and County Route 506 which runs directly through the township. County Route 577 runs through the southeastern portion of Verona. Other highways near Verona include the Garden State Parkway, Interstate 80 and the New Jersey Turnpike.

=== Public transportation ===
NJ Transit bus routes 11 and 29 serve the township, providing service to and from Newark. In September 2012, as part of budget cuts, NJ Transit suspended service to Newark on the 75 line.

DeCamp Bus Lines offers commuter service on their 33 bus route between West Caldwell and the Port Authority Bus Terminal in Midtown Manhattan.

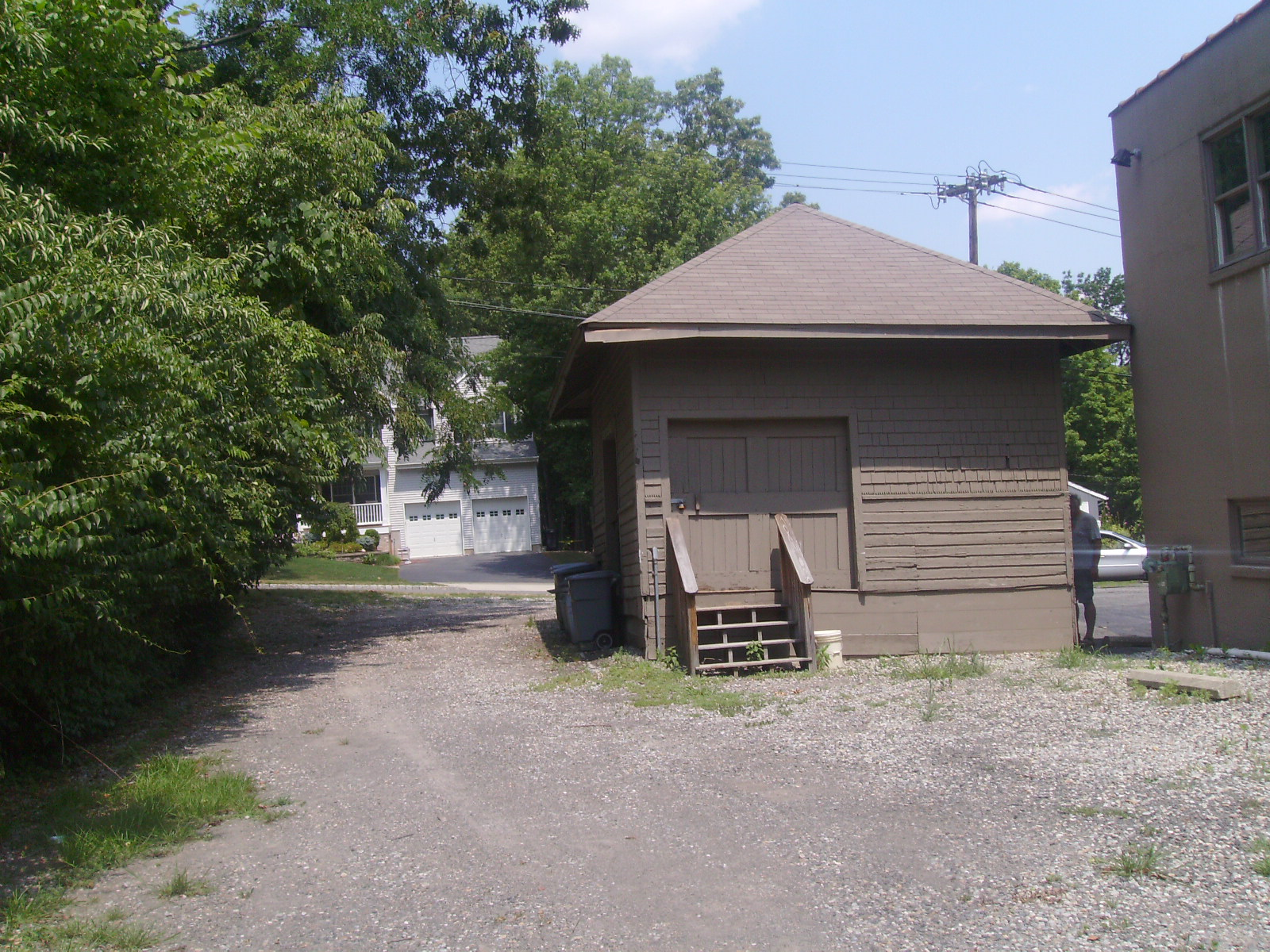
The last vestige of the Erie Railroad's Caldwell Branch, the Verona Freight station with the former right-of-way

Train stations, also run by New Jersey Transit, are located in the neighboring towns of Little Falls and Montclair. Prior to 1966, the Erie Railroad's Caldwell Branch (a part of New York and Greenwood Lake Railway) ran passenger service through Verona from Great Notch. The line was removed in 1979 after a washout four years prior. On July 14, 2010, the township of Verona announced that it was honoring the old freight shed at the Verona station, the last standing structure of the railroad. The project of naming it a historic landmark in Verona, the first of many proposed by the Verona Landmarks Preservation Commission. Proposals include moving the structure to a more accessible place in Verona or turning the shed into a one-room museum.

In the early 20th century, Verona was serviced by a trolley line which operated on Bloomfield Avenue. The tracks still lie underneath the roadway, and are visible when the roadway is under construction.

Verona is 14.3 miles (23.0 km) from Newark Liberty International Airport in Newark / Elizabeth, and almost twice as far from John F. Kennedy International Airport and LaGuardia Airport.

== Local media ==
=== Newspaper ===
Verona is served by two weekly newspapers: The Verona-Cedar Grove Times and the Verona Observer. The Star-Ledger, the largest newspaper in New Jersey, covers major news stories that occur in Verona.

=== Internet ===
Local news is covered by the Verona-Cedar Grove Times, www.myveronanj.com, www.verona.patch.com, and by the official township website.

=== Radio ===
Verona falls in the New York Market, as well as the Morristown Market.

=== Television ===
Verona Cable television is served by Comcast of New Jersey. However, in 2007, Verizon introduced its Verizon FiOS service to the township. Comcast Channel 35 & Verizon FiOS Channel 24 is Verona Television (VTV) a Government-access television (GATV) channel that runs council meetings, school board meetings and community functions, as well as any other Verona-related Public-access television videos submitted by the residents. VTV is maintained by the Verona Public Library.

== Community services ==
- The Verona Fire Department is one of the largest fully volunteer fire departments in Essex County, staffed by over 60 firefighters. They have two stations, three engines, one ladder truck, one reserve engine, one brush truck, one utility truck, two command vehicles, and a heavy rescue. The department, founded in 1909 shortly after Verona was created, celebrated its 100th year of service in 2009.
- The Verona Rescue Squad (volunteer) has three ambulances, two EMS bikes, one first responder vehicle and one command vehicle in one station on Church Street. Formed in 1927 it is one of the oldest EMS organizations in the state. Boasting over 120 members it is one of the largest volunteer EMS agencies in the area.
- The main street in Verona is Bloomfield Avenue, where the Town Hall, Library, Middle School, and many shops, restaurants, and businesses are located.
- During the American Revolutionary War, George Washington and his troops used Eagle Rock Reservation as one of a chain of observation posts to monitor British troop movements.
- The Essex Mountain Sanatorium opened in 1902 as the Newark City Home for Girls. With tuberculosis spreading through Newark, the site was converted into a sanatorium in 1907, against the wishes of local residents. Its location at the highest point in Essex County was believed to be beneficial and the facility was known for its high recovery rate before it closed in 1977.

== Notable people ==
People who were born in, residents of, or otherwise closely associated with Verona include:

- Tommy Albelin (born 1964), NHL defenseman for New Jersey Devils and coach of De Paul High School hockey team
- Kevin Bannon (born 1957), former men's college basketball head coach who was the Rutgers Scarlet Knights men's basketball team's head coach from 1997 through 2001
- Leila T. Bauman, painter
- John C. Bogle (1929–2019), founder of The Vanguard Group
- Joop Boutmy (1894-1972), Dutch amateur footballer, Olympic bronze medalist at the 1912 Summer Olympics in Stockholm.
- Bill Bradley (born 1943), Olympic gold medalist at the 1964 Summer Olympics, professional basketball player for the New York Knicks, member of the Basketball Hall of Fame, US Senator from New Jersey, and 2000 Presidential hopeful
- Lorinda Cherry (1944–2022), computer scientist and programmer who spent much of her career at Bell Labs
- Fillmore Condit (1855–1939), inventor, temperance activist and local politician
- Marion Crecco (1930–2015), member of the New Jersey General Assembly from 1986 to 2002
- Jay Curtis (1950–2018), author, producer, writer, director and actor, who co-directed 75-0: The Documentary, about a 1966 loss in a game of football by a score of 75–0 to Madison High School, part of a 32-game losing streak
- Peter David (born 1956), science fiction and fantasy author who has used Verona as location in his fiction, such as location of villain Morgan le Fay in his first novel, Knight Life
- Dan DePalma (born 1989), wide receiver who has played for the Saskatchewan Roughriders of the Canadian Football League
- Mary Dunleavy (born 1966), operatic soprano
- Anthony Fasano (born 1984), tight end for the Tennessee Titans
- David Festa (born 2000), professional baseball pitcher for the Minnesota Twins
- Geirry Garccia (1952–2010), animator, painter and filmmaker recognized as a "brainchild" of Filipino animation
- Jed Graef (born 1942), swimmer, gold medalist in 200m backstroke at 1964 Summer Olympics in Tokyo
- Barbara J. Griffiths (born 1949), diplomat who was the United States Ambassador to Iceland from 1999 to 2002
- Fred Hill Jr. (born 1959), coached Rutgers Scarlet Knights men's basketball team
- Fred Hill Sr. (1934–2019), former head coach of the Rutgers Scarlet Knights baseball team
- Philip E. Hoffman (1908–1993), lawyer who served as national president of the American Jewish Committee and as American Ambassador to the United Nations Human Rights Council
- Fred Krupp, president of the Environmental Defense Fund, spent childhood in Verona
- Archie Lochhead (1892–1971), first director of the Exchange Stabilization Fund and president of the Universal Trading Corporation
- John MacLean (born 1964), player and assistant coach for NHL's New Jersey Devils
- Phyllis Mangina (born 1959), college basketball coach who is currently an assistant women's basketball coach at Saint Peter's
- Elmer Matthews (1927–2015), lawyer and politician who served three terms in the New Jersey General Assembly
- Nicole McLaughlin, artist and designer, best known for upcycled fashion pieces
- Jay Mohr (born 1970), actor, comedian and radio personality
- Jon Okafor (born 1989), professional soccer midfielder
- Eugénie Olson, novelist and editor
- Henry Orenstein (1923–2021), professional poker player, helped push Hasbro to produce Transformers
- Kal Parekh, film and television actor who played the role of Sanjeev, an Indian-American flight engineer in the ABC television series, Pan Am, set in the 1960s
- Kenneth Posner, lighting designer for such Broadway shows as Wicked, Legally Blonde, The Pirate Queen, and The Coast of Utopia, the latter of which won him a Tony award
- Brian Rafalski (born 1973), hockey player, New Jersey Devils defenseman
- Saul Robbins (1922–2010), toy manufacturer, co-founder of Remco
- John Roosma (1900–1983), captain of Ernest Blood's "Wonder Teams" who became first college player to total 1,000 points for his career while at United States Military Academy
- Joel Rosenblatt, musician best known as the longtime drummer for the jazz-fusion band Spyro Gyra
- David M. Satz Jr. (1926–2009), lawyer who served as U.S. Attorney for District of New Jersey from 1961 to 1969
- Brenda Shaughnessy (born 1970), poet
- Donald J. Strait (1918–2015), flying ace in the 356th Fighter Group during World War II and a career officer in the United States Air Force
- Craig Morgan Teicher (born 1979), author, poet and literary critic whose poetry collection, The Trembling Answers, won the Lenore Marshall Poetry Prize in 2018
- Rod Trafford (born 1978), former NFL tight end who played for the Buffalo Bills and the New England Patriots
- Bruce Wands (1949–2022), educator, author, artist, and musician, with a specific interest in digital art
- Chris Wylde (born 1976), actor and comedian

== In popular culture ==
- The HBO crime drama The Sopranos was set in the area, and the storyline often included scenes filmed in Verona. Livia Soprano's house is in Verona in the series pilot, and a Verona Rescue Squad ambulance is seen when she dies in the episode "Proshai, Livushka". In the episode "Cold Cuts", it's established that Bobby Baccalieri and Janice Soprano live in Verona.
- The 1987 horror movie Doom Asylum was filmed at the now demolished Essex Mountain Sanatorium.
- Pizza My Heart, an ABC Family movie, is a contemporary retelling of Romeo and Juliet, that is set in Verona (New Jersey, not Italy). Although the storyline is set in Verona, it was actually filmed in New Orleans, Louisiana.
- The original, unaired pilot of the television show Strangers With Candy, "Retardation: A Celebration", was filmed at Verona High School. The VHS signboard is also used in almost every episode thereafter to display various witticisms, although the name has been changed to that of the school in the show, Flatpoint High School.
- Pearl, the hairdresser in "The Saturdays" by Elizabeth Enright (1941), says she ran away from her abusive stepmother in Verona and went to New York City with her brother Perry.
- Filming for scenes in the Adam Sandler movie Happy Gilmore 2 took place at Verona Town Hall.
