= Allbirds =

American footwear and apparel company

Allbirds, Inc.

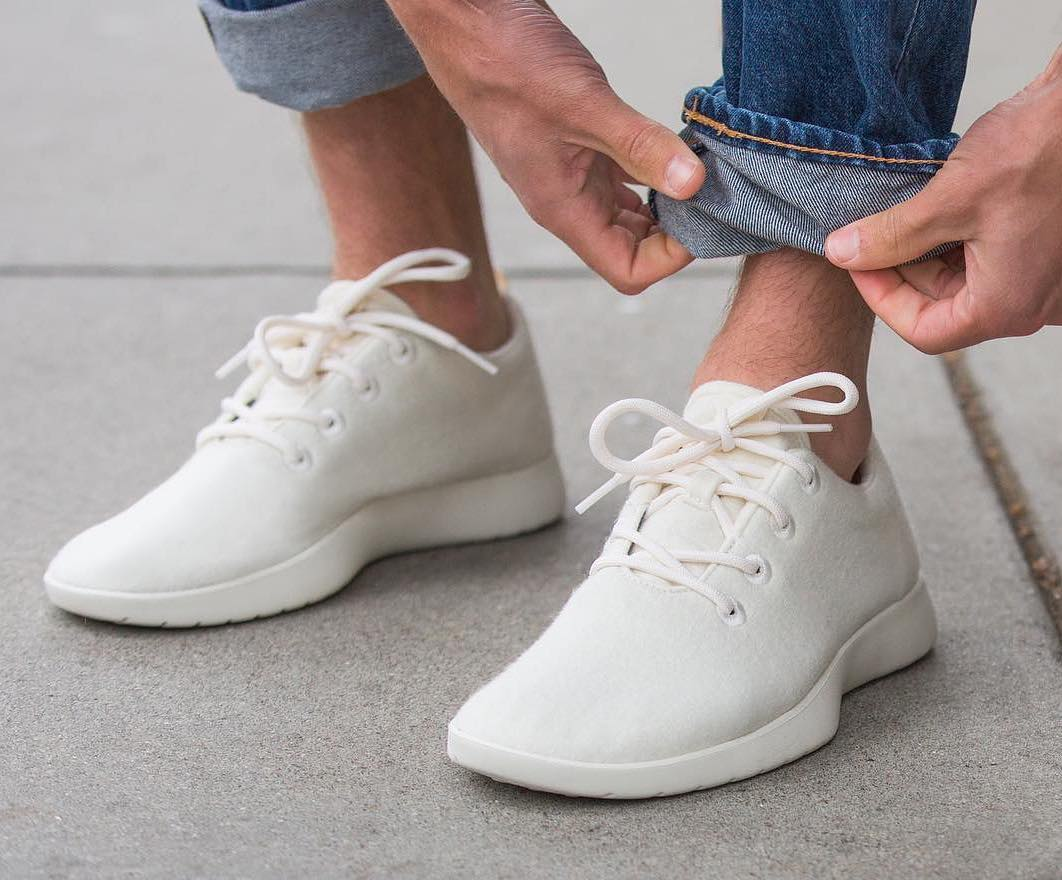
- White Wool Runners
- Industry: Footwear
- Founded: 2015; 11 years ago
- Founders: Tim Brown; Joey Zwillinger
- Fate: purchased by American Exchange Group
- Headquarters: San Francisco, California, US
- Key people: Nadia Carlsten (CEO); Ann Mitchell (CFO)
- Revenue: ▼US$189.8 million (2024)
- Net income: ▲US$−97.6 million (2024)
- Total assets: ▼US$188.9 million (2024)
- Total equity: ▼US$101.7 million (2024)
- Number of employees: ▼542 (2024); 927 (2023)
- Website: allbirds.com

Allbirds is an American footwear and apparel brand that was co-founded in 2015 by Tim Brown and Joey Zwillinger. It is known for their minimalist designs, association with environmental, social, and governance (ESG) principles, and Silicon Valley. Its business model has primarily relied on direct-to-consumer commerce through its website and brick and mortar stores, although its physical retail has been closed.

Allbirds was founded through an initial fundraising of US$119,000 on Kickstarter and based its corporate identity on sustainability. Since the 2020s, the company has been criticized by legal scholars for greenwashing after a case about their reporting of carbon offsets was dismissed.

During the late 2010s, the brand's shoes became popular among tech workers in major US cities, particularly in Silicon Valley.

Allbirds went public on November 3, 2021, but experienced poor sales soon afterwards; executive turnover followed the company through the end of 2024. On April 8, 2024, the company received a non-compliance notice from Nasdaq for performing below $1 for over 30 consecutive days.

On March 30, 2026, Allbirds announced that it was selling its shoe business, trademarks and all assets and liabilities to American Exchange Group for $39 million. Two weeks later, the company announced it would be pivoting to providing computing infrastructure for artificial intelligence and renaming itself Smartbird.

== History ==
=== 2014–2020: Founding ===
Tim Brown, co-founder of Allbirds, first began making shoes for his friends while enrolled in business school. In 2014, amidst declining demand for Merino wool in New Zealand due to the rise of recycled polypropylene and a lack of industry representation, he secured a grant from New Zealand's wool industry. Brown launched his idea on Kickstarter, raising $119,000 in five days. After the 2014 Kickstarter launch, he began to work with Joey Zwillinger in 2015, a biotechology engineer who had sold algae fuel. They then launched Allbirds' Wool Runner in March 2016. The name "Allbirds" references New Zealand's lack of native land mammals, making it a land of "all birds".

The company began with the Wool Runners casual sneakers. During its first year in business, Allbirds raised $7.25M from investors who included Maveron and Lerer Hippeau Ventures. Articles in publications such as Time and The New York Times were described as the company "having a good publicist" by Jordyn Holman and Matthew Townsend of Bloomberg News.

By the end of 2017, Allbirds expanded across the United States and into South Korea and Australia. In October 2018, after previous fundraisers, the company raised $50M in Series C funding, bringing the company's total valuation to $1.4B. Allbirds expanded into other footwear (including running shoes and flip-flops) and athleisure clothing in collaboration with Outdoor Voices and Nordstrom. Further collaborations were coordinated with Adidas and independent designers such as Nicole McLaughlin through 2021.

The company began operating brick-and-mortar stores in the United States in 2017. Allbirds opened its first store in the United Kingdom on October 17, 2018, in London's Covent Garden.

By 2020, the company had raised $100M in Series E funding and had 21 retail stores worldwide. From 2016 to 2021, before going public, Allbirds raised over $200M in funding rounds alone.

=== 2021–present: Public offering and AI pivot ===
Allbirds went public on the Nasdaq on November 3, 2021, with the ticker symbol BIRD at a price of $12–14. That year, the company removed a line that it was "the first 'sustainable' IPO" from its listing after pressure from the Securities and Exchange Commission (SEC). A month before the IPO, Allbirds reduced its references to "sustainability principles and objectives" by half. The company lost $25.9M against $219M of revenue the previous year, which Zwillinger said was in pursuit of a sustainable business model. Allbirds leaned further into its brand as sustainable by collaborating with Adidas to create a sneaker "that promises to have almost no carbon footprint" and by focusing on environmental impact in its advertising.

According to a GlobalData consumer panel, the company began a decline in annual sales by 2022 as its brand was seen as part of 2010s Silicon Valley attire and its shoes' lack of durability became better known. Other brands, such as Atoms and Veja, were claimed to be taking some of Allbirds' market share as early as 2020 in a Wall Street Journal article by Jacob Gallagher. The 2022 release of the Tree Flyer ended a period of experimentation with the company's offerings, including leggings, jackets, and dresses, which were unpopular with its customer base. Suzanne Kapner of The Wall Street Journal reported that "Other types of apparel that Allbirds introduced such as $250 puffer jackets and $88 dresses, also made from merino wool, didn't attract customers and had to be discounted. The company has since discontinued its leggings and other performance clothing and liquidated unsold apparel at a cost of roughly $13 million." The Financial Times' Lauren Indvik criticized Allbirds' new clothes, such as cardigans and other sweaters, as overly simple.

Complaints about the shoes' lack of durability also increased, and division between the company's co-CEOs about consumer-audience vision emerged. Brown believed that younger customers looking for fashionable items would drive sales, which conflicted with Zwillinger's view that the shoes themselves were the novelty consumers looked to. Zwillinger reflected on the poor sales of products such as the Tree Flyers running shoes in relation to its price of $160, saying "consumers weren't ready to shell out $160 for a technical running performance product from us, given that's not the ethos [of our] DNA." The co-founders then adopted formalized, separate roles, with Zwillinger transitioning to chief executive officer while Brown became chief innovation officer. The company then undertook a transformation plan to adhere to its original product lines while taking cost-saving measures along its supply chain. To recover from the loss in sales and investor confidence, the company began to sell its products at big-box, brick and mortar Nordstrom and Dick's Sporting Goods stores between April and June 2022.

However, the company was sued by its shareholders in May 2023 amidst declining sales. The lawsuit was filed as Allbirds tried to diversify from footwear to other products, a strategy with lower core consumer interest. The shareholders alleged that Allbirds' strategy was misleading, leading investors to buy shares at artificially-inflated prices and constituting securities fraud. Judge Araceli Martínez-Olguín dismissed the case without prejudice in May 2024, and the plaintiffs filed an amended complaint which the company again sought to dismiss on grounds which included lack of standing.

By the fourth quarter of 2023, Allbirds had a net-revenue decrease of 14.5 percent since the fourth quarter of 2022. The group of companies with which Allbirds went public, including Casper Sleep and Warby Parker, was noted by Bloomberg News' Olivia Rockeman as all having struggled as public companies. Rockeman placed Allbirds among other companies using online commerce who were shifting from independent sales platforms to aggregate retail platforms such as Amazon for increased visibility.

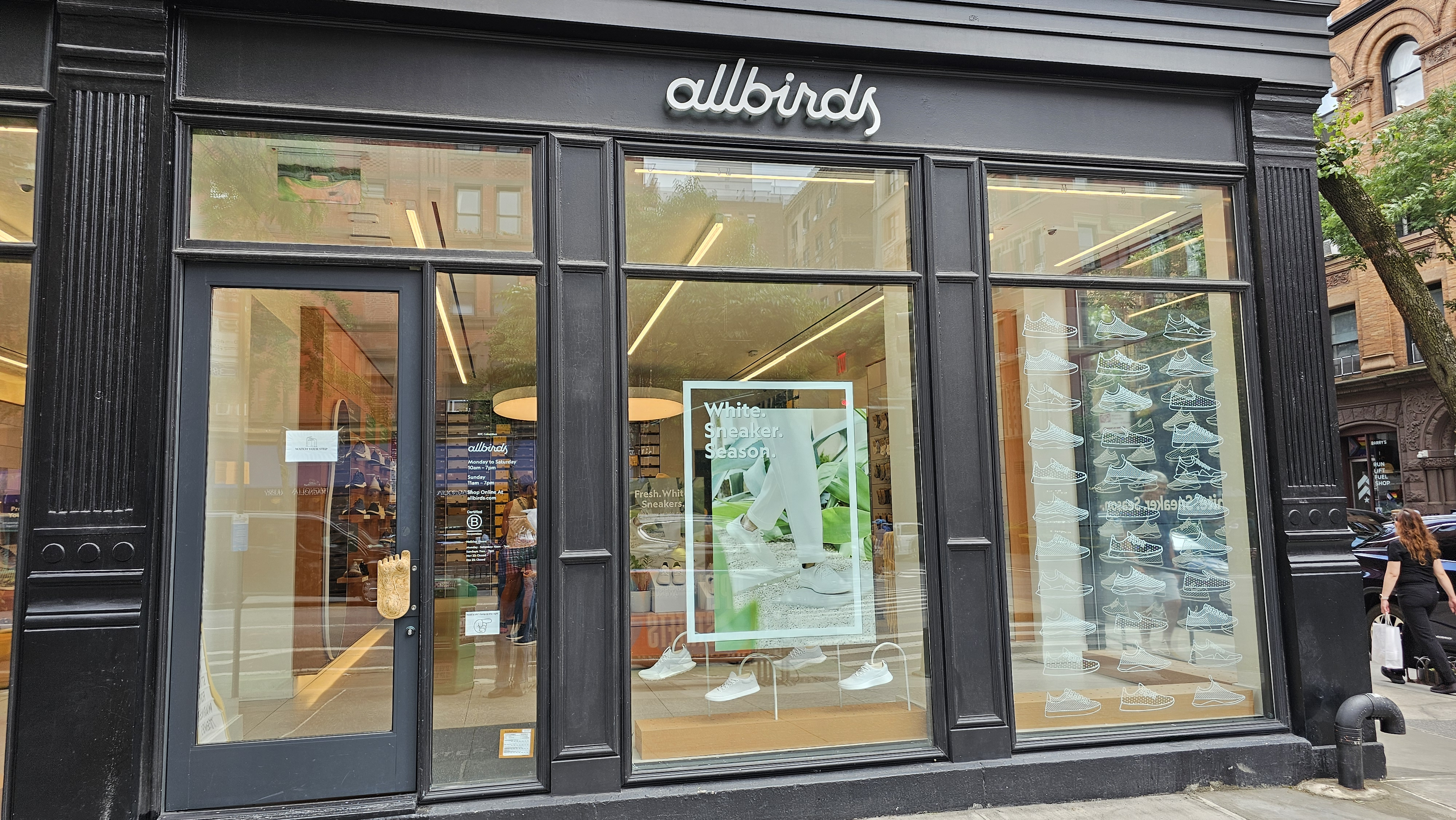

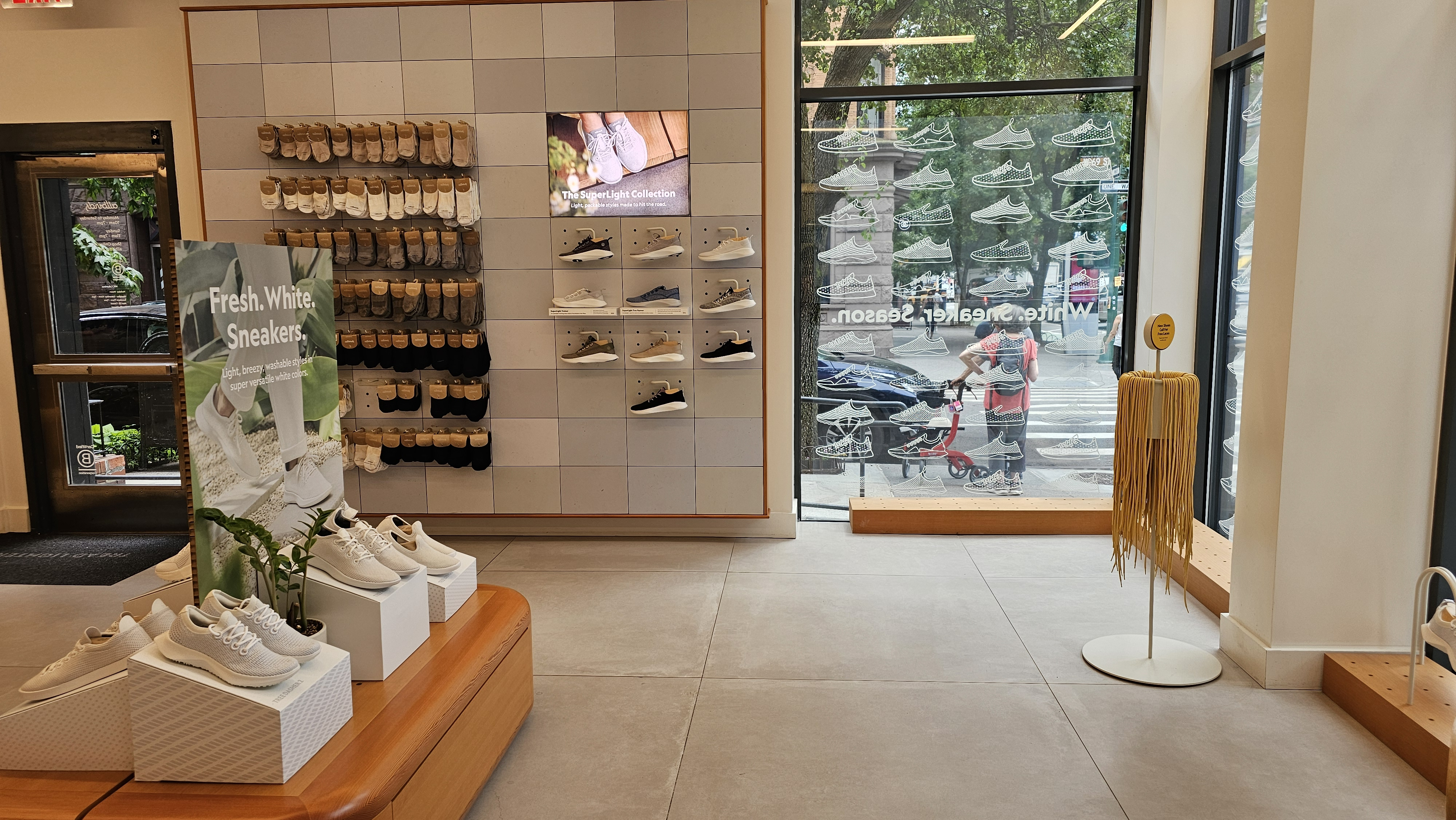
Exterior and interior of a store on Columbus Avenue, New York.

On March 12, 2024, Zwillinger was replaced by former Allbirds chief operating officer Joe Vernachio as CEO. Vernachio outlined plans to focus on already-successful products rather than experimenting with new ones, and said that the company would rely on its retail partners. Zwillinger remained on the board of directors. Earlier that year, the company promoted Kelly Olmstead to chief marketing officer and recruited Adrian Nyman as chief design officer. Chief financial officer Mike Bufano was succeeded by Annie Mitchell on April 24, 2023.

On April 8, 2024, Allbirds received a non-compliance notice from Nasdaq because its share price was $1 for 30 consecutive days. Through August of that year, the company discussed a reverse stock split to maintain its listing with investors. Allbirds underwent a 1-for-20 consolidation on September 4, 2024; its stock price was $9.69 the next day and $13.79 after a week.

The company began to downsize its plans to open more physical stores in countries such as Germany at this time. On January 28, 2026, Allbirds announced it would close all full-price stores in the United States by the end of February 2026, maintaining only 4 stores across the United States and the United Kingdom. The company also projected a decrease in net revenue from $165 million–$180 million to $161 million–$165 million for 2025. On March 30, 2026, Allbirds announced it would sell its assets and liabilities to American Exchange Group. American Exchange paid $39 million for the intellectual property, brand, customer relationships, and all remaining inventory. The inventory was worth $43 million at the time of the acquisition.

On April 15, 2026, Allbirds announced that the company was pivoting to providing cloud infrastructure for artificial intelligence, and was renaming itself to "NewBird AI". This boosted its market cap from $21 million on 14 April to $148 million on 15 April following the announcement.

In May 2026, Allbirds sold its footwear assets to American Exchange Group for $39 million. The company rebranded yet again in June 2026, announcing that it was changing its name to "Smartbird" and appointing Nadia Carlsten as chairman and CEO.

== Corporate affairs ==
=== Brand impersonation ===
Allbirds sued Steve Madden in December 2017, alleging that the company's Traveler shoes looked nearly identical to its Wool Runners and infringed Allbirds' trade dress. After settling the case in the Northern District of California, Allbirds brought a similar lawsuit in the same court against Austrian footwear maker Giesswein Walkwaren.

In November 2019, Zwillinger accused Amazon's shoe line, 206 Collective, of producing a look-alike of the Wool Runner design for $60 less. The company did not bring Amazon to court, which Zwillinger called "risky" in reference to Amazon's large legal teams. Later that week, Zwillinger and Brown wrote a Medium article inviting Amazon to use some of its materials to "jointly make a major dent in the fight against climate change." The instance with Amazon was cited as an example of the company's willingness to lose money in the name of sustainability by reporter Sasha Rogelberg. In an article for The Fashion Law, both the case against Walkwaren and the instance of Amazon's shoes were suggested to not be overtly violating Allbirds' trade dress, stating that "it is worth noting that there are, in fact, notable design differences between the various brands sneakers."

=== Sustainability and manufacturing ===
A number of observers have cited Allbirds as a sustainable brand. The company is a certified B Corporation, and uses sustainable materials such as merino wool and eucalyptus in production. Other shoe components, such as laces and insoles, are made from recycled plastic bottles, castor beans, plant starch, wood pulp, and Tencel. In 2018, shoes were manufactured in Shenzhen, China. In conversation with Ryan Gellert of Patagonia, Zwillinger said that Allbirds convinced the Footwear Distributor Retailers of America to adopt a carbon price: an informal tax on goods that produce carbon emissions that would be put into ESG efforts such as sustainability research.

== Reception ==
=== Construction and durability ===
Allbirds uses SweetFoam, a material made of recycled sugarcane, instead of the petroleum-based industry standard ethylene-vinyl acetate for the soles of its shoes. The company's production of sugarcane is certified by the nonprofit environmental-verification organization Proforest as ensuring environmental security. Sugarcane sourced for SweetFoam is acquired from Brazil and produced by Braskem as a byproduct of ethanol production. Biofabricated leather produced by Modern Meadow is used for the 2026 collection of "Terralux" sneakers.

Praised by Time as one of the best inventions of 2018 for its carbon reduction, Runner's World's Jeff Dengate wrote reviews of the Tree Dasher 2 and Tree Flyer in 2022 and 2023. Dengate liked the shoes' environmental goals and casual fit, but criticized their soles, grip, and weight. Of the Tree Flyer, Dengate claimed they were "slightly lighter and bouncier than the Dasher 2, thanks to a new foam made from castor bean oil" (improving its usability for running), but found the shoe's cushioning and heel-stitching worse than traditional running shoes. Dengate called the Dasher 2 too heavy, although it was 0.3 ounces (8.5 g) lighter than the Dasher.

=== Silicon Valley and fashion ===
The Wall Street Journal and The New York Times reported that Allbirds initially became popular among tech-industry professionals, particularly in Silicon Valley. The brand's minimalist, logo-free design and eco-friendly wool fabric resonated with the tech community, leading to popular adoption of Allbirds as an unofficial uniform among American "tech bros." Some observers have used the shoes to critique Silicon Valley's influence on corporate culture in the United States. A New Yorker article by Rachel Syme said that the shoes "cannot really be categorized as ugly footwear, because the idea behind them is not proud unstylishness but technical perfection." Syme links the shoes to the increased presence of casual wear in the white-collar workforce, where sneakers have gained acceptance over traditional dress shoes. A white-collar worker might then signify their values and differentiate themselves from colleagues by engaging in conspicuous consumption, buying shoes with an environmental mission. New York Times critic Jon Caramanica called Allbirds shoes "studiously unstylish", connecting the shoes' utility and the occupations of their wearers by saying that they are "for people who poke around in the code on the websites they visit, and who would prefer not to think too hard about their footwear choices."

Journalism professor Myles Ethan Lascity describes the shoes' sustainable framing as "anti-fashion", referring to a style of dress that is indifferent to trends in fashion. Lascity ties Allbirds' anti-fashion identity to Uniqlo, which he said promotes itself as a technology brand rather than a clothing company. In Allbirds' case, the company frames itself as a sustainability brand rather than a shoe company.

Other observers, such as Ian Servantes of Inverse, critiqued the shoes for gentrifying the sneaker market historically associated with Black culture in the United States. Servantes said that the shoes' appeal to stereotypically affluent, white Silicon Valley workers lacks authenticity in the sneaker subculture.

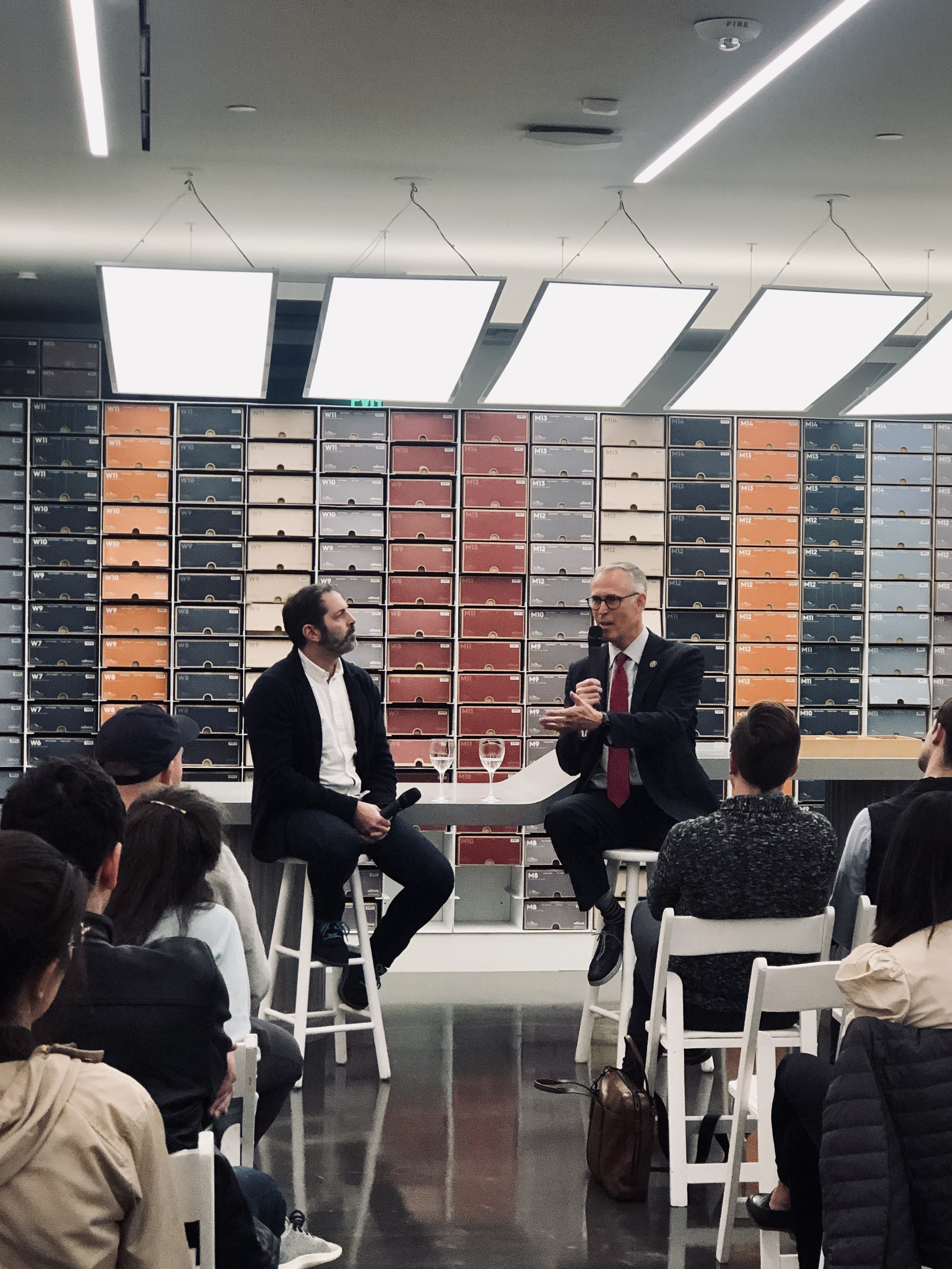
US Congressman Jared Huffman (right) and Joey Zwillinger (left) speaking at a store in Washington, DC in 2020.

=== Greenwashing ===
Legal analysts have criticized Allbirds in light of Dwyer v. Allbirds, Inc. for allegedly appearing environmentally friendly for promotional purposes while failing to deliver on sustainable promises. Allbirds was the subject of a 2021 federal lawsuit, Dwyer v. Allbirds, Inc., in the Southern District of New York accusing the company of misleading consumers about its sustainability practices by not mentioning the carbon impact of its wool sourcing. Allbirds used the Higg Index to measure its carbon impact on the level of individual products rather than the entire supply chain, omitting the impacts of shipping and production. Allbirds was accused of false advertising by using images of happy sheep in promotional materials, rather than images of production facilities. Citing an investigation by People for the Ethical Treatment of Animals, Dwyer further accused Allbirds of cruelty towards its sheep, claiming the advertisements of happy sheep were "empty welfare policies that do little to stop animal suffering". Judge Cathy Seibel dismissed the case in 2022 on the grounds that the company adheres to the Federal Trade Commission's Guides for the Use of Environmental Marketing Claims, and depictions of happy sheep in advertising were puffery.

In the University of Kentucky's Journal of Equine, Agriculture, & Natural Resources Law blog, Abigail Barford wrote that although demands for corporate transparency have increased, few standards have been implemented at the governmental level. Barford noted that ESG guidelines are often used in marketing an IPO, as she alleged Allbirds did during and after the Dwyer case.

Ciara Peacock of the West Virginia University College of Law writes about the case in a discussion of American courts' tendencies to give corporate carbon offsets and credits a high bar for legal criticism, noting that cases charging corporations with unrealistic use of carbon offsets (such as Dwyer) overwhelmingly end in motions to dismiss. In Dwyer, Peacock wrote that there is no consistent legal precedent for when a company should begin to measure carbon output; this allows corporations to publicize incomplete depictions of their supply chains. Fellow legal scholar Valerie J. Peterson said that Allbirds excludes wool manufacturing from its life-cycle assessments, which measure the environmental impact of a product or service from production to destruction. Christopher Marquis of Fast Company disagreed, crediting the company for maintaining near-term and transparent goals by contrasting them with other, more-opaque companies such as Delta Air Lines and Keurig.

After securing independent reviews as a certified B Corporation, an ESG rating from Sustainalytics, and a Sustainability Principles and Objectives Framework analysis from ISS ESG, Allbirds filed for S-1 registration with the SEC. Uniquely in IPO law, Allbirds was subject to SEC review; other bonds used to fund environmentally-safe projects have not had to. Alexander Coley of the Northwestern University Pritzker School of Law identifies this dynamic as a weakness and a strength of the securities-regulation industry. Amanda Schwaben of Case Western Reserve University School of Law said that Allbirds' framing as a public benefit company is a means of attracting investment with dubious returns. Other management analysts cite Allbirds' B Corporation ranking as an example of the private-sector creating its own incentives to maintain sustainable business practices. Democratic U.S. Congressman Jared Huffman of California's 2nd Congressional District held a conference with Zwillinger in 2020 where he criticized B Corp status and the 45Q tax credit, which grants a break to corporations that practice carbon capture, for being functionally ineffective.

=== Popular culture ===
In 2018, New Zealand Prime Minister Jacinda Ardern gave Australian Prime Minister Malcolm Turnbull a pair of Allbirds sneakers during an official visit to Australia. That year, actor Leonardo DiCaprio invested in the company, tweeting that Allbirds is “dedicated to creating a more sustainable future by developing new materials and serving as a model for the footwear industry.”

Former United States President Barack Obama has worn the shoes on a number of occasions, and a 2019 Esquire article reported that he wore a pair at a basketball game. After Obama wore the shoes at a podcast recording in 2020, Cam Wolf wrote an article for GQ criticizing the shoes as "Zoom Formal" and drew a parallel between him and his cabinet to Silicon Valley.

== See also ==
- Sustainable fashion
- Merino sheep
