= Cascale =

Alliance in apparel and consumer goods

Cascale, formerly the Sustainable Apparel Coalition (SAC), is a global, non-profit alliance in apparel and consumer goods. Cascale owns and develops the Higg Index.

== Overview ==

Cascale comprises over 300 members across brands, retailers, manufacturers, NGOs, and affiliates and is said to represent more than 40 percent of the industry. Membership has included H&M, Gap Inc., Nike, adidas, Puma, Patagonia, Mountain Equipment Co-op (MEC), Levi's, Hanesbrands, Marks & Spencer, Esprit, Columbia, Timberland and Loomstate. It seeks to lead the industry toward a shared vision of sustainability built upon a common metric for measuring sustainability performance called The Higg Index. Today, the Higg Index reports 24,000 users.

It has faced criticism and changes in recent years, especially in regards to the Higg Index. Amid the pandemic, in 2020, the nonprofit developed a new strategic plan titled "Evolution for Impact," which outlines three strategic pillars: combat climate change, decent work for all, and a nature-positive future.

== History ==
Outdoor brand Patagonia and retailer Walmart created the SAC in 2009 to find a unified way to measure sustainability performance in the industry. Adventurer and businessman Rick Ridgeway cofounded the SAC while working with Patagonia. The Higg Index includes the Higg Facility Environmental Module (FEM), Higg Facility Social & Labor Module (FSLM), Higg Brand & Retail Module (BRM), Higg Materials Sustainability Index (MSI), and Higg Product Module (PM).

In recent years, the SAC has evolved solely from its tools to programs like the 2030 Decarbonization Program or Manufacturer Climate Action Program (MCAP) to help the industry decarbonize. The programs align with a 45-percent emissions reduction pathway by 2030 to take charge of the industry's sizable contribution to climate change. The first version of the Higg Index was published in 2012, but the organization continues to make tool updates.

In June 2022, the Norwegian Consumer Authority (NCA) notified SAC that its transparency program was potentially "misleading" to consumers. The Higg MSI tools were also challenged for allegedly promoting use of synthetics. In response to the NCA inquiry, the SAC paused its consumer-labeling pilot and increased engagement with consumer groups. The organization also announced it would expedite an independent review of its tools. In December 2023, the SAC's then chief executive officer Amina Razvi left the organization after several years, citing a mutual decision with the board.

The nonprofit is influential in apparel, counting a number of spinoff organizations including technology partner Worldly (formerly Higg Co.), Apparel Impact Institute (Aii), and Social & Labor Convergence Project (SLCP). SAC and SLCP helped create The Converged Assessment Framework (CAF), a tool for measuring working conditions in facilities.

The SAC is also a founding member of the "apparel alliance," alongside Textile Exchange, Apparel Impact Institute (Aii), and Zero Discharge of Hazardous Chemicals (ZDHC). With the Global Fashion Agenda (GFA) and the Federation of European Sporting Goods, the SAC co-founded the Policy Hub in 2020 to propose sustainability policies. Policy Hub openly advocates for the Product Environmental Footprint (PEF).

In February 2024, the SAC rebranded as Cascale citing a new evolution for the organization.
