= Dwyer v. Allbirds Inc. =

Dwyer v. Allbirds, Inc.
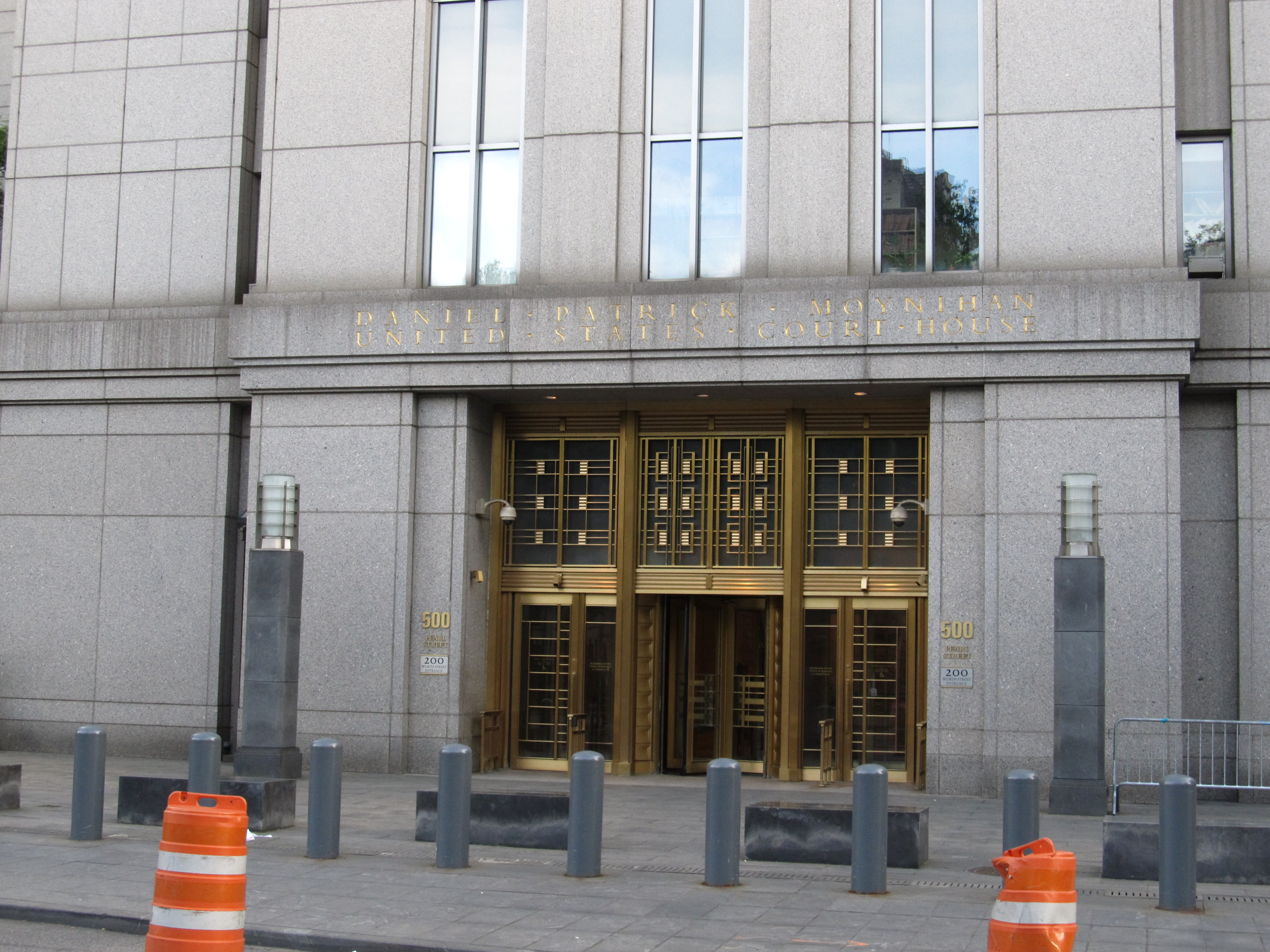
- Court: District Court Southern District of New York
- Decided: April 18, 2022

Court membership
- Judge sitting: Cathy Seibel
- Chief judge: Cathy Seibel

Dwyer v. Allbirds, Inc., No. 7:21-cv-05238 (S.D.N.Y. Apr. 18, 2022), is a U.S. District Court decision addressing claims of greenwashing under New York's consumer protection laws. The court dismissed the complaint, ruling that Allbirds' environmental marketing statements were not misleading and did not violate state law.

The case began when Patricia Dwyer filed a class action lawsuit against Allbirds, a footwear company that is purported to be environmentally friendly. Dwyer argued that Allbirds' advertising claims, such as their claim to have a "low carbon footprint" and the slogan "sustainability meets style," misrepresented the environmental impact of the company's products.

However, the court disagreed, concluding that Allbirds' marketing claims were not likely to mislead a reasonable consumer. The judge emphasized that generalized environmental statements do not constitute deceptive practices under New York law. The ruling clarified that companies could engage in sustainable marketing without violating protection standards as long as their claims are not materially false or misleading.

== Background ==
=== History of greenwashing and environmental marketing claims ===
Companies have adopted sustainability-focused branding strategies in response to a growing public concern over climate change and environmental damage. Terms like "eco-friendly", "carbon neutral", and "sustainable" have become marketing tools, and their use has begun causing concerns about misleading or exaggerated claims. The practice is now referred to as greenwashing.

In response, the Federal Trade Commission published the Green Guides in 1992 (last revised in 2012) to guide marketers on how to avoid misleading environmental advertising. These guidelines urge transparency and require that environmental benefit claims be substantiated with reliable scientific evidence.

Over the years, the use of environmental claims has expanded alongside consumer demand for ethically and sustainably produced goods. However, enforcement of these standards has remained limited, with most accountability driven through litigation and public scrutiny rather than regulatory penalties. In the absence of federal regulation specifically targeting greenwashing, plaintiffs have increasingly turned to state consumer protection laws to challenge allegedly deceptive sustainability claims. This legal trend has played a central role in high-profile cases like Dwyer v. Allbirds, where courts are being asked to determine whether modern marketing practices have crossed the line from aspirational branding into misleading advertising.

== Argument ==
Allbirds Inc. Logo

Plaintiff Patricia Dwyer alleged that Allbirds, Inc. engaged in deceptive and misleading advertising practices in violation of New York's General Business Law 349 and 350, as well as common-law theories including fraud, breach of express warranty, and unjust enrichment. Dwyer argued that Allbird's claims, such as their claim to use "sustainable wool" and have a "low carbon footprint", conveyed a false impression about the environmental impact and animal welfare practices involved in its supply chain.

Specifically, she asserted that Allbirds used incomplete life-cycle assessments (LCAs) that failed to account for factors like land use, water pollution, and methane emissions from sheep, thus inflating its sustainability image. Dwyer further claimed that Allbirds misled consumers by portraying sheep used in its products as being ethically and humanely treated, when in reality the wool industry often involves routine slaughter and mistreatment. The plaintiff filed a putative class action seeking damages and injunction relief, asserting that consumers were deceived into purchasing products based on these allegedly false representations.

== Lower courts ==
In Dwyer v. Allbirds, Inc., Judge Cathy Seibel of the U.S. District Court for the Southern District of New York dismissed all claims brought by the plaintiff, Patricia Dwyer. The case focused on whether Allbirds' advertising statements, which included the word "sustainable" and the phrase "our sheep live the good life," were misleading under New York's consumer protection laws.

The court ruled that these types of statements were too general and vague to be considered false or misleading. Judge Seibel explained that terms like "sustainable" are often seen as opinions or marketing language rather than factual promises. As a result, they are considered "puffery" and not something that the law usually treats as deceptive.

Seibel also found that Allbirds explained how it calculated its carbon footprint, and Dwyer did not show that the company's numbers were false or used in a misleading way. Without any clear errors or lies in the information Allbirds shared, the court stated there was no strong basis for a legal claim.

In addition, the court dismissed the plaintiff's other claims for fraud, breach of warranty, and unjust enrichment. These were based on the same facts and did not add anything new, so they were also thrown out.

== District Court decision ==
Although this case did not move beyond the district court, it still offers insight into how courts are handling lawsuits about environmental marketing. The decision adds to a growing number of cases where judges have said that broad or feel-good statements about sustainability usually do not count as false advertising, unless they are very specific and clearly untrue.

The court emphasized that it is not just about whether a claim is literally true, but also how an average shopper would understand it. General claims like "sustainably made" or "our sheep live the good life" are often seen as opinions or values, not promises that can be proven right or wrong, so they usually do not qualify as misleading under consumer protection laws.

Although this ruling did not come from a higher court, it touches on larger legal issues. If the case had gone to an appeals court, it might have raised deeper questions about how sustainability claims relate to free speech, how consumers interpret green marketing, and how the Federal Trade Commission's Green Guides apply.

Legal experts view the Dwyer v. Allbirds case as an example of where the law might be heading. As more companies use environmental and ethical claims in their branding, courts will likely continue to ask: Are these claims just part of the brand's image, or are they specific enough to be held legally accountable?

This case suggests that while companies can talk about sustainability, they should be careful not to make bold claims without clear evidence, especially if they use numbers or scientific-sounding language that consumers might take as fact.

== Significance ==
The Dwyer v. Allbirds case is significant for its clarification of how courts interpret sustainability and ethical marketing claims under consumer protection laws. By dismissing the lawsuit, the court affirmed that generalized or aspirational statements, such as "sustainably made" or "our sheep live the good life" are not likely to mislead a reasonable consumer and therefore cannot form the basis of a deceptive advertising claim under New York General Business Law. The ruling reinforces the idea that courts expect a higher level of specificity and factual grounding for environmental claims to be actionable.

Although the decision is not binding at the federal appeals level, legal experts see it as an important sign of how courts may handle future greenwashing lawsuits. it shows that judges are becoming more cautious about claims based on personal opinions or debates over methods. The case also points to a growing conflict between what consumers expect from companies on sustainability and the legal limits on how marketing can be regulated, an issue likely to gain more attention as environmental claims become more common in advertising.

== See also ==
- Climate change litigation
