= Mountain Equipment Company =

Canadian outdoor equipment retailer

MEC Mountain Equipment Company Ltd.

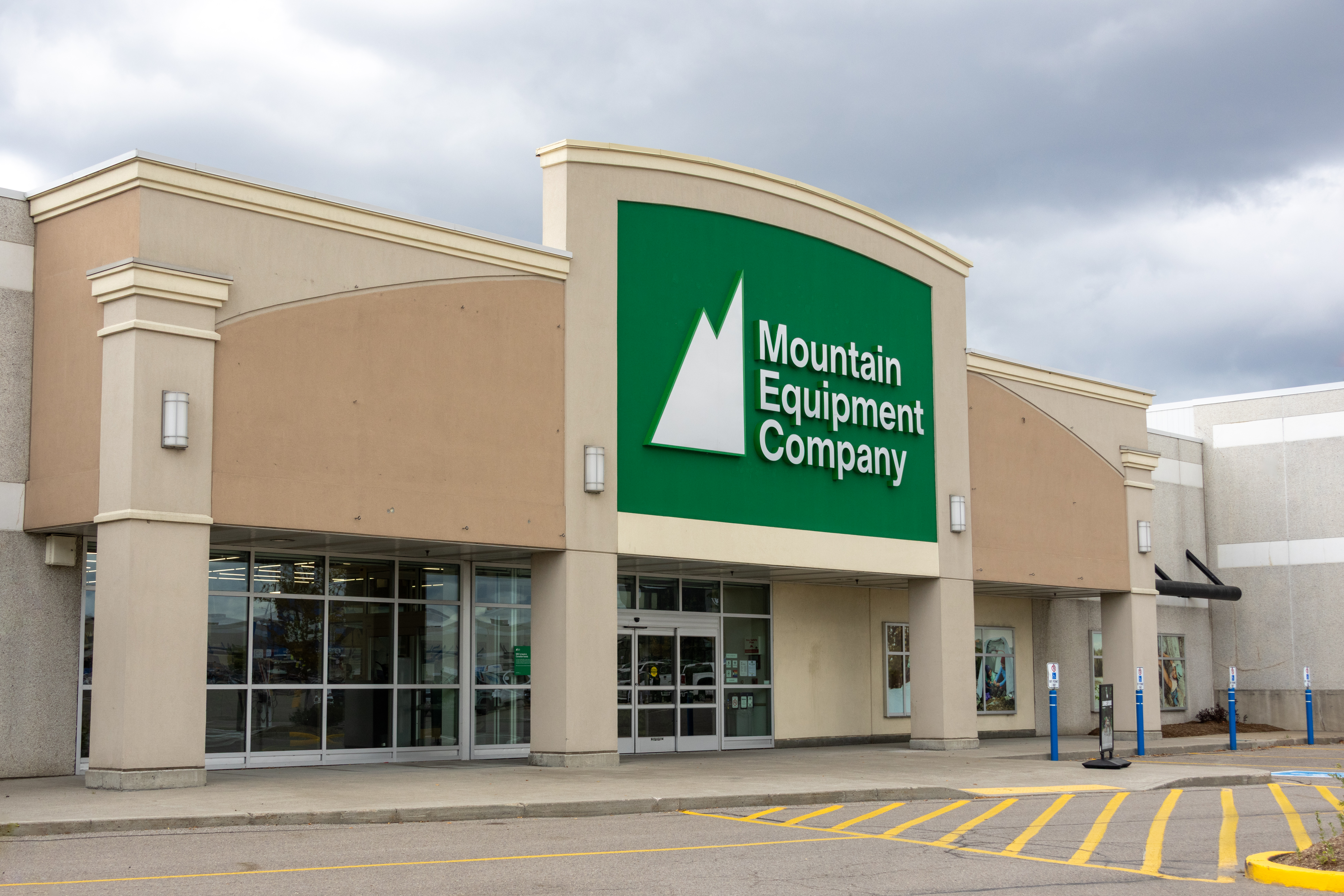
- A MEC store in Whitby, Ontario
- Company type: Privately held company
- Industry: Outdoor equipment
- Founded: October 30, 2020; 5 years ago
- Headquarters: Vancouver, British Columbia
- Number of locations: 21
- Key people: CEO: Peter Hlynsky
- Website: www.mec.ca

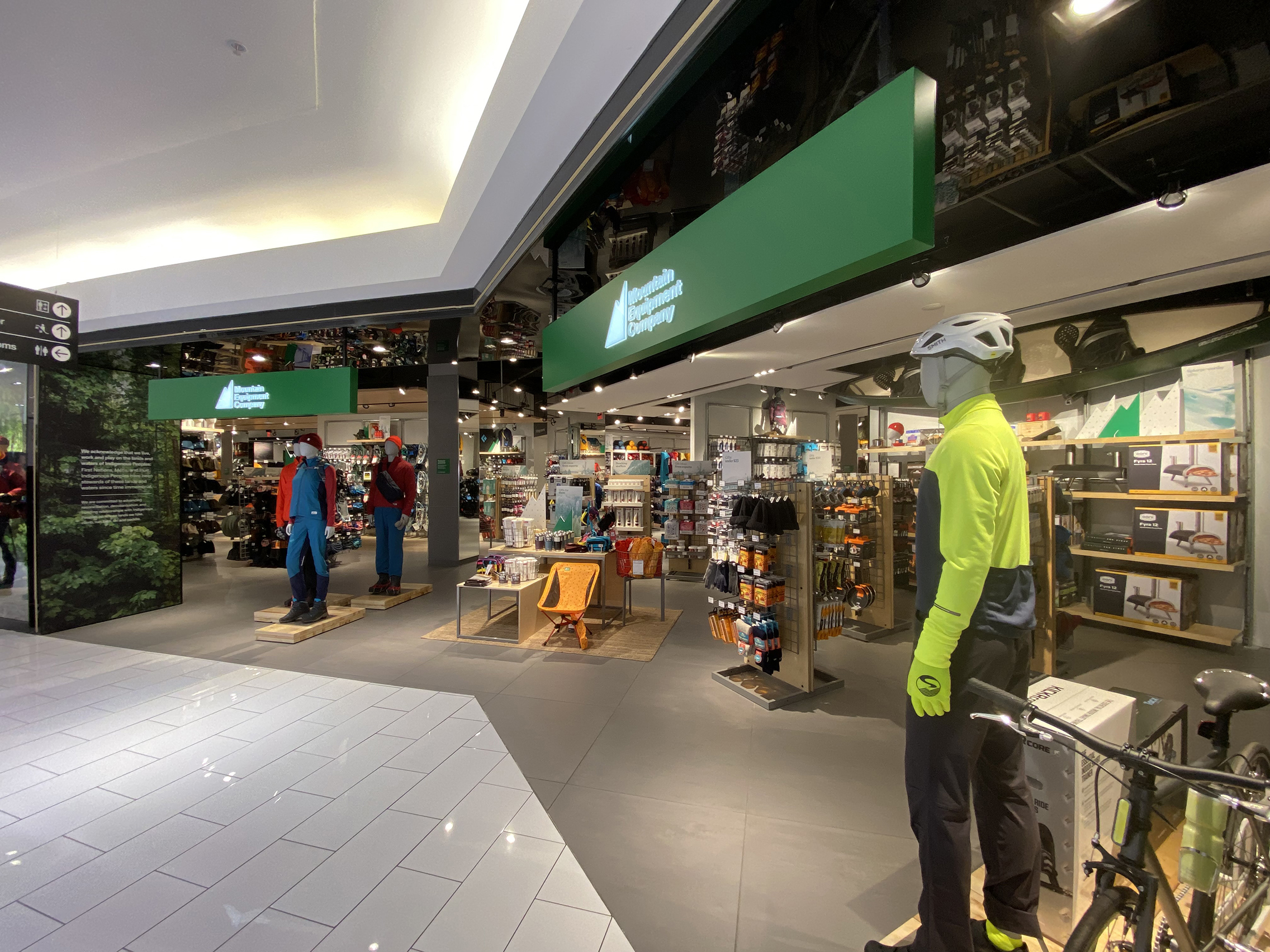
Mountain Equipment Company in Square One Shopping Centre, Mississauga, Ontario

Mountain Equipment Company, or MEC, is a chain of Canadian retail stores that sell outdoor recreation gear, formed from the assets of the defunct retail co-operative Mountain Equipment Co-op. It was formed by the American private equity firm Kingswood Capital Management, which acquired these assets in October 2020. In 2025, it was sold to a "group of Canadian investors", with Kingswood retaining a minority stake in the company.

== History ==
Kingswood, via a newly-formed subsidiary initially named MEC Canada Inc., assumed 21 stores from Mountain Equipment Co-op in late 2020. The business continued to operate under the brand MEC; the new company also assumed ownership of other trademarks such as the "Mountain Equipment Co-op" name, but could no longer accurately call the operation a co-op. The new management claims to have turned the money-losing co-op into a profitable venture in the first few months of operation, despite the COVID-19 pandemic that was in progress at the time.

Changes made included ending the practice of returning seasonal merchandise to the warehouse at the end of the season and instead using sales to clear it, including redesigning store manager bonuses to create incentives to promote this. The new company also moved out of its leased headquarters and into cheaper accommodations, as well as renegotiating store leases with landlords. About 100 head office staff were laid off. In 2021, the company also planned to close its warehouse in Brampton, Ontario and contract that function out to a third party provider.

Re-establishing the organization's creditworthiness with suppliers following the co-op's bankruptcy was an early priority.

The management also streamlined supply chains and production of the MEC branded products, a line that had been losing money in recent years. This included ending the practice of MEC buying its own fabric for contractor production, which in the opinion of the new management resulted in waste and excessive risk.

The new management moved immediately to address former co-op members who were angry that the co-op's assets had been sold without member consultation and also that the historic Canadian brand had been sold to a for-profit American company. Kingswood’s founder and managing partner, Alex Wolf, stated, "the reaction – which was pretty dramatic – we think is a testament to how strongly people feel about the brand and the desire for the brand to continue."

The new company actually expanded its workforce overall, with 1,284 employees at the time of the sale in October 2020 to 1,332 by April 2021.

Additional plans include reducing the number of product brands offered and the variety of merchandise, as well as focusing on both new and established outdoor enthusiasts. The e-commerce business was to be removed from the retail stores and was to sell some different products, in an effort to reduce shipping and inventory costs. The previous MEC "Rock Solid Guarantee" that allowed any returns for any reason will be modified and made more limited, as it was identified as having been abused by some former co-op members in the past.

A loyalty program to replace the former co-op membership is in planning stages. The company also plans to open new locations in the future.

In April 2021, The Globe and Mail reported the Ontario stores that had been forced to close due to the COVID-19 pandemic's second wave had reopened on 16 February 2021, with the Toronto stores' reopening delayed a week due to the restrictions imposed. Seven weeks after the stores were reopened a new round of lockdowns in Ontario due to a third COVID-19 wave resulted in more layoffs and closures. The Globe and Mail reported, "amid the most recent wave, eight stores have been forced to close and roughly 60 employees sent home". Eric Claus, MEC CEO and Chairman, stated that even while dealing with the COVID-19 imposed closures and restrictions, "in every single month [since the sale], we’ve made money".

By mid-2021, the retailer's corporate name had changed to "MEC Mountain Equipment Company Ltd.". In October 2021, the chain officially rebranded as Mountain Equipment Company, in the process restoring the "twin peaks" mountain logo that had been mostly retired by the co-op in 2013.

In October 2023, Chief Operating Officer Peter Hlynsky was named the new CEO, replacing Eric Claus.
