= Nicole McLaughlin =

American artist and designer

- Known for: Fashion
- Style: Avant-garde
- Website: nicolemclaughlin.com

Nicole McLaughlin is an American artist and designer best known for upcycled fashion pieces.

== Personal life ==
McLaughlin was born and raised in Verona, New Jersey, graduating in 2011 from Verona High School. She has a bachelor's degree in photography and digital art from East Stroudsburg University of Pennsylvania.

== Work ==
McLaughlin's work involves the reuse of materials for reconstructed clothing. She began creating reconstructed clothing as a hobby while working as a graphic designer at Reebok, using discarded samples from the company. She conducts workshops and collaborates with brands and institutions, including the Cooper Hewitt, Smithsonian Design Museum, where she teaches design students.

=== Collaborations and other ventures ===
Some of McLaughlin's footwear collaborations include projects with Merrell, Hoka, and Puma.

McLaughlin was named in the Forbes 30 Under 30 list for 2023.

In 2020, sustainable footwear company Allbirds announced a collaboration with McLaughlin under fashion house Market Studios. Mike Cherman of Market Studios introduced McLaughlin to Allbirds founder Tim Brown. The money raised through collaboration was donated to the mutual aid collective, The Okra Project, and the environmental group, Sunrise Movement.

In 2024, McLaughlin collaborated with Highsnobiety magazine to repurpose Samsonite backpacks into a jacket. The jacket features detachable sleeves and two backpack pouches on the front. McLaughlin described modularity as a core principle of her design philosophy.
