= Green guides =

Sustainability rule and incentive list

A green guide (or sustainability guide) is a set of rules and guidelines provided for the use of a general or selective population to achieve the goal of becoming more green or sustainable. The guide serves to direct individuals, agencies, companies, businesses, etc. to resources that can help them become more sustainable (or ‘green’), as sustainability becomes a more popular and growing lifestyle choice. Guides are available in many ways, but the most popular being through websites to avoid using paper. There has also been a surge of guides in university websites to encourage students towards a more sustainable way of life.

== History ==
The original “green guides” were created by the Federal Trade Commission (FTC). The Federal Trade Commission created these “green guides” to “help marketers avoid making environmental claims that are unfair or deceptive under Section 5 of the Federal Trade Commission Act”.

In order to guide consumers away from dishonest environmental claims, the FTC issued two consumer-facing brochures called “Eco-Speak: A User’s Guide to the Language of Recycling” and “Sorting out ‘Green’ Advertising Claims”. The FTC also issued a brochure for businesses called “Complying With the Environmental Marketing Guides”. This guide provides businesses with the complete guides and a review of green marketing claims. The Federal Trade Commission issued their first guide in 1992 and since then has updated them in 1996 and 1998. Most recently the Federal Trade Commission has proposed a revision of their guides in October 2010. Due to the proliferation of products claiming to be green in the marketplace in recent years the Federal Trade Commission began this third revision process early as the Commission held several workshop meetings open to the public to discuss green marketing issues. These workshops covered carbon offsets, “green” product packaging, building products, and textiles claiming to be green. Through this review process the Federal Trade Commission is able to gain feedback from the public as well as perform a cost-benefit analysis, determine the efficacy of their guides, and decide whether to maintain, modify, or discard the current set of guides and rules.

Even before the Federal Trade Commission created its first green guide in 1992 there were plenty of people interested in sustainability and the environment who wanted some sort of guidance when it came to living and purchasing more eco friendly. Especially in recent years with the growing environmental movement, a myriad of organizations and individuals have released their own guides to living sustainably or in other words their own “green guides.” For example, National Geographic, a magazine company whose slogan is “inspiring people to care about the planet since 1888,” first launched its National Geographic Green Guide in 2003. This magazine guide gave readers tips and examples on how to live a more sustainable and “greener” life. National Geographic discontinued the print version of their guide in January 2009, but it continues to run the guide on their webpage. There readers can read over guides on living more sustainably with their home and garden, travel and transport, food, and purchases. Also National Geographic provides readers with recent environmental news, “green living hot topics,” and interactive quizzes to determine how sustainably their living and what they can do to change.

Every day more and more people and organizations keep generating new ideas and novel innovations on how to live more sustainable lives. These fresh ideas act themselves as green guides as long as their information is spread, either by print or on the internet. For example, back in November 2007 Rebecca Kelley and Joy Hatch were just two friends who happened to be pregnant at the same time, but by sharing their ideals and interests of raising their children sustainably they created a blog called “The Green Baby Guide”. This blog created a guide for mothers interested in how they could make their child rearing process more environmentally friendly and sustainable. Eventually their community of interested mothers grew so large that they came out with a book in March 2010 called "The Eco-nomical Baby Guide: Down-to-Earth Ways for Parents to Save Money and the Planet". With more people wanting to become enlightened about sustainable living every day there is plenty of room for additional green guides to be produced causing the history of green guides to be changing and evolving all the time.

== Federal Trade Commission ==
The Federal Trade Commission green guide is a general guide made by the United States government. It uses examples of everyday ‘green items’. The articles are quite broad, and can be applied to almost every ‘green’ consumer product. The FTC issued its Green Guides, to help marketers avoid making environmental claims that are unfair or deceptive under Section 5 of the FTC Act. The Green Guides outline general principles that apply to all environmental marketing claims and then provide guidance on specific green claims, such as biodegradable, compostable, recyclable, recycled content, and ozone safe. The FTC issued the Guides in 1992, and updated them in 1996, 1998, and 2012. Currently, the FTC is making revisions to the guides to keep up with the times.

== National Geographic ==
The National Geographic website gives a variety of resources aimed primarily at individuals in their easy to comprehend green guide. Here, the website focuses on ways everyday people can help towards a sustainable world as well as changes they can make to live that world as well. With categories involving home and garden, travel, transportation, and food, National Geographic encompasses the areas people have the most control over in their life.

Under the home and garden, the site provides simple yet shocking facts about certain products and practices that one might not even think about in one's everyday home life. Also, the site provides alternatives to these practices as well as tips to make both your home and your garden sustainable.

The travel and transportation section also provides other tips as to how one would green up their traveling as well as provides destinations for travel. In this category, National Geographic, as per its name, also has some information on geotourism. Defined as "tourism that sustains or enhances the geographical character of place," this section gives information about places that one might decide to go on for travel.

With food, the site gives valuable information about food and the impact to the environment that it could have; moreover, the site educates readers as to up to date advances in technology that could prove more sustainable than past technologies when it comes to cultivation of food. Finally, there is a section on certain recipes that provides information to certain aspects of food preparation, as well as food itself, that proves harmful towards sustainability and the environment in general.

Adding to that, the website also provides a ‘buying guides’ option that educates people in the purchases they make and how that could affect the environment as well as their wallets. Under this option, the website provides tips and services as to products that everyday people might want to purchase. These tips encompass things like cost, what kinds of regulations one would have to understand for the product, pertinent information regarding the kind of product, as well as how the product itself and the kind you decide to buy impact the environment.

== Green Guide UK ==
“The Green Guide” is a version of a sustainable living guide that was created in the UK in 1997. This guide consists of an online database as well as a published print version. Not only is “the Green Guide” a guide to sustainable living, but it is also a directory that contains information about “products, services and organisations that help promote and encourage a sustainable lifestyle”.

The guide provides useful advice and tips, but it also contains lists of organizations and companies that can further inform and assist readers in their quests to live more sustainably. Since this guide is produced in the United Kingdom, the vast majority of the listings are of companies located in the United Kingdom, but it also contains over 350 international listings as well as information and tips that are applicable almost anywhere in the world.

“The Green Guide” is broken down into twelve chapters each dealing with different themes spanning a wide variety of lifestyles. Each one of these chapters is then further broken down into sections and subsections where the writers found appropriate. In total, the guide consists of 994 different sections and subsections all pertaining to different strategies, tips and information that can help readers live a more sustainable life. The twelve different chapters are as listed:

- 1. Food and Farming
- 2. Fashion and Beauty
- 3. Building, Home and Garden
- 4. Renewable Energy and Recycling
- 5. Health and Wellbeing
- 6. Children, Family, Community and Gifts
- 7. Transport and Travel
- 8. Leisure, Activities and Holidays
- 9. Money, Sustainable Business and CSR
- 10. Government, Campaigning and Change
- 11. Media, Arts, Events and Awards
- 12. Centres, Research, Education and Careers.

By June 14, 2010, the directory portion of “the Green Guide” had over 15,000 entries, however, only just over 10,000 are available to view online. This is because not all of the potential entries are accepted by “the Green Guide” due to the fact that they do not match the standards the guide has set. One of the major problems organizations like “the Green Guide” face is the issue of green washing. Green washing is the issue of companies attempting display themselves as environmentally friendly or green just to gain customers when in fact they are not at all green. This can be an enormous concern as companies like “the Green Guide” try their best to create guides full of truly sustainable companies

== Grassroots ==
In addition to published green guides, there are many grassroots green guides for the average, everyday consumer. These grassroots guides cover anything a consumer cannot find in any published green guides, such as green guides to weddings or even babies. The importance of amateur writers to create green guides is cooperative to the green guide movement itself as its sole purpose it to provide information for consumers.

Grassroots green guides can be written by anyone with any sort of knowledge in the subject they are writing about. Green Guides are sparse, so any help to further the movement is encouraged. It is the hope of the individuals who create these green guides to have available, over the internet, a publicly view able 'encyclopedia' or green guides based on the public's needs and desires.

== University and College Guides ==
According to the Princeton Review, these sixteen universities in the United States have gained the Green Honor Roll based on the criteria listed in the review:

- The percentage of food expenditures that go toward local, organic or otherwise environmentally preferable food
- The availability of programs that encourage alternatives to single passenger automobile use for students
- The presence of a formal committee with participation of the students devoted to advancing sustainability on campus
- The requirement of buildings to be LEED Silver certified or equivalent
- Overall waste diversion rate
- The availability of an environmental studies major, minor, or concentration
- If the school has an ‘environmental literacy’ requirement
- If the school has a publicly available greenhouse gas emission inventory and adopted a climate action plan consistent with 80% greenhouse gas reduction by 2050
- Percentage of energy consumption derived from renewable resources
- The employment of a dedicated full-time (or the equivalent) sustainability officer

The following list of schools have received a Green rating of 99, the highest grade possible given by the Princeton Review.

- American University, Washington, D.C.
- Arizona State University at the Tempe campus
- College of the Atlantic, Bar Harbor, Maine
- Dickinson College, Carlisle, Pennsylvania
- Georgia Institute of Technology, Atlanta, Georgia
- Harvard College, Cambridge, Massachusetts
- Northeastern University, Boston, Massachusetts
- Oregon State University, Corvallis, Oregon
- San Francisco State University
- State University of New York at Binghamton
- University of California, Santa Cruz, California
- University of Maine, Orono, Maine
- University of Washington, Seattle, Washington
- University of Wisconsin, Stevens Point, Wisconsin
- Virginia Tech, Blacksburg, Virginia
- Warren Wilson College, Asheville, North Carolina
