= Mountain Equipment Co-op =

Canadian co-operative formed to sell outdoor equipment

- Type: Cooperative
- Industry: Outdoor equipment
- Founded: 1971; 55 years ago in Vancouver, British Columbia
- Defunct: October 2020
- Fate: No longer operating; brand name and assets were acquired by Mountain Equipment Company
- Headquarters: Vancouver, British Columbia

Mountain Equipment Co-op (now called 1077 Holdings Co-operative) was a Canadian co-op that started the MEC outdoor gear retail brand. The MEC brand name, assets and store leases were purchased by the American private investment firm Kingswood Capital Management's subsidiary Mountain Equipment Company in October 2020. 1077 Holdings Co-operative remains active to deal with the remaining claims by creditors and will be wound up at some point in the future.

Mountain Equipment Co-op was formed as a Canadian consumers' co-operative to sell outdoor recreation gear and clothing exclusively to its members. Mountain Equipment Co-op was notable for its commitment to environmental protection and other causes. As a co-op, Mountain Equipment Co-op sold only to customers who held a lifetime membership, which was technically a share of the co-op. MEC (as a co-operative) was Canada's largest supplier of outdoor equipment. Following its founding in Vancouver, British Columbia in 1971, MEC expanded across Canada and grew to operate stores in 20 cities. Once catering to mountaineers and climbers, MEC targeted a broader, more urban clientele, having added more clothing as well as cycling and yoga supplies. At its peak MEC had over 5.4 million members in Canada and internationally.

Facing mounting financial losses in 2019 and during the COVID-19 pandemic in Canada, in September 2020, without consulting its membership, the board of directors of the co-operative entered into an agreement to sell its assets to Kingswood. Following the completion of the deal in late October, Kingswood began operating the retail assets as a for-profit business.

== Organization ==
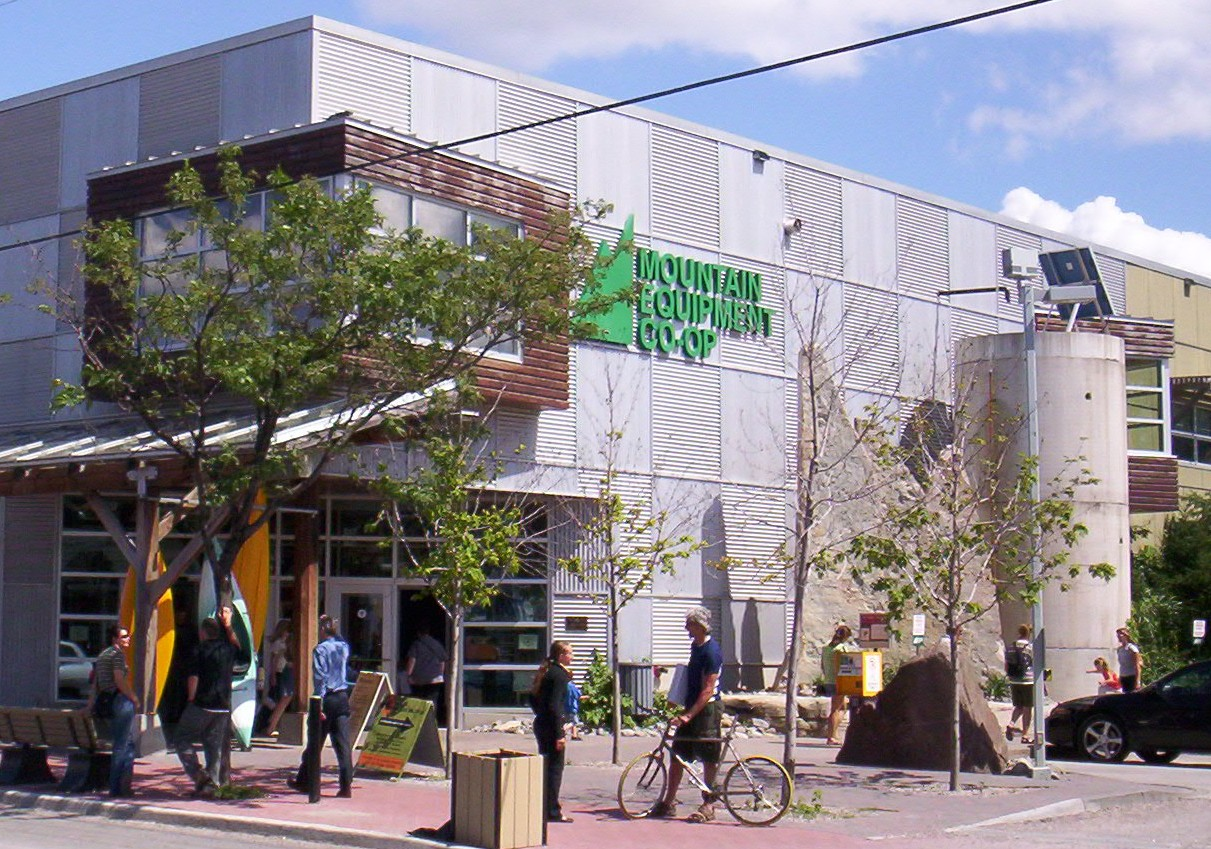
The former MEC store in Ottawa

MEC operated twenty-two retail stores and a "Corporate & Group Sales" store for large orders. Some MEC stores incorporated eco-friendly designs. The Ottawa and Winnipeg stores were the first and second retail buildings in Canada to comply with Canada's C2000 Green Building Standard, which acknowledges buildings that achieve energy consumption 50% less than similar conventional structures.

The organization designed and produced a significant proportion of its retail products and also carried other well-known brands. A significant proportion of the company's inventory was manufactured in Asia, with names and addresses of partner-factories made publicly available on the co-op's website. MECs' stated aim is to inspire and enable people to lead active, outdoor lifestyles. They accomplish this by selling outdoor gear, clothing and services. MEC's head office and telephone service centre were located in Vancouver. Its distribution centres were located in Brampton, Ontario and Surrey, British Columbia.

== Governance ==
Chris Strashok, the author of an academic study, remarked in 2011 that "currently there are 3.3 million member owners making MEC the fourth largest democratic entity in Canada, after the governments of Canada, Ontario and Québec." Each year, every member of MEC has the opportunity to vote in the elections for its board of directors, as well as on "special resolutions", through a variety of methods. Before the election period, an information package with platforms of candidates and information on resolutions is distributed. Election results are announced at the annual general meeting.

MEC is governed by a nine-member board of directors. Each year, three directors are elected to three-year terms.

MEC holds its annual general meeting in Vancouver, BC. At this meeting, the Chief Executive Officer and Committee members deliver their annual reports, and answer questions from co-op members. "Other resolutions" may also be brought forward and voted upon. The AGM is typically webcast and members can log in and ask questions. Typically, members recite their member numbers before speaking and these numbers are recorded in the official meeting transcript.

=== Co-op structure ===
Strashok remarked in 2011 that, "profits are either shared among member owners based on how much the member uses the co-operative or invested back into the co-operative to improve the services provided to the members, and to sustain the business. Because of this, MEC is financially conservative, growing slowly and taking few risks. This can be challenging when the business is moving through different stages of growth. It does, however, create space for creative solutions and capital remains local benefiting the communities in which MEC operates." While the democratic structure gave one vote to one member, the financial structure and "policies and legislation pertaining to business in Canada, such as how capital is classified, the classification of dividends versus patronage payments, and tax incentives for investing in co-operatives" were, as noted by Strashok, ill-studied by Canadian business schools. These profits were returned to members as the patronage dividend or patronage return that can be found in yearly financial statements.

For the purposes of governance and direction at the AGM the policy was one member, one vote, regardless of how much share capital had been earned by any particular member. Share redemptions were carried out, for example through gift cards, and may have required a policy affirmation. Thus MEC found a means of treating each member as equal, regardless of purchases and shares earned. In 2020 the 5.7 million members had a paid-up capital of $192 million, well above the $5 initiation fee per member. This capital was reinvested in things like stock of merchandise and expansion of the retail empire.

=== Purposes and objectives ===
The purposes of the Co-op were from the outset closely intertwined with its governance model. In 2008, the commonweal of the Co-op was measured by Ponto according to Anielski's Genuine Wealth model, while in 2011 Strashok produced a case study that focused on its promotion of sustainable development. The governance model was altered significantly from 2011, to change MEC's focus to a more traditional accounting and retail-based business model.

=== Environmental and social initiatives ===
MEC had undertaken initiatives in the field of social and environmental responsibility, including:

- MEC was the first Canadian retailer to publicly disclose its list of factories and their locations, and updates this list annually.
- In May 2007 MEC became a Bluesign member. MEC committed to the goal of sourcing 100% Bluesign approved fabrics by 2020. In 2019, 88% of MEC apparel and sleeping bag materials were Bluesign certified. Bluesign is a third party environmental, health and safety standard for the textiles industry.
- MEC committed to using 100% organic cotton for all MEC-branded apparel and sets yearly targets to increase its offering of products made from recycled materials.
- MEC promotes a variety of outdoor education opportunities to its members by an online calendar of events.
- In December 2007, MEC became the first retailer in Canada to stop selling water bottles and food containers containing bisphenol A, a chemical that is used to make some plastics and has been linked in some studies to increased incidence of cancer and other diseases.
- In 2008, MEC eliminated all single-use shopping bags from its stores.
- In 2010 MEC launched a new green building initiative called MEC GBS (Green Building Systems). The aim of the initiative was to ensure MEC leaders in building and operating environmentally-friendly facilities. Its Winnipeg, Longueuil, Burlington and North Vancouver stores, as well as its Montreal office received LEED Gold ratings. Its Winnipeg, Montreal and Ottawa stores also comply with C2000 standards (Natural Resources Canada's Advanced Commercial Buildings Program).
- In March 2018, MEC announced that it would no longer stock products made by Vista Outdoor, in response to the 2018 NRA boycott, in the wake of the Stoneman Douglas High School shooting, because some of Vista Outdoor's profits are derived from the production of assault weapons.

=== Business initiatives ===
The organization had engaged in several business initiatives:

- In 1997 MEC introduced a free of charge online gear swap where members can trade used outdoor gear.
- MEC's distribution centre in Surrey British Columbia was opened in the fall of 2007 and was the first "Green" LEED (Silver) accredited distribution centre in North America.
- In November 2008 MEC opened bicycle repair shops in Vancouver, Calgary, Toronto and Montreal stores. The Winnipeg and Burlington stores opened their repair shops in March 2009. As of September 2015, sixteen stores have bike servicing.
- In the summer of 2008 MEC launched a series of annual national paddling and biking expositions named "MEC Paddlefest" and "MEC Bikefest".

=== Leadership ===
==== CEO ====
- Bill Gibson 1992–2000
- Peter Robinson 2000–2007
- David Labistour 2007–2019
- Philippe Arrata 2019–20

==== Board chair ====
- Chris McNeil
- Anders Ourom
- Denise Lawson (2009–2012)
- Bill Gibson (2011–2014)
- Margie Parikh (2014–2016)
- Ellen Pekeles (2017–18)
- Judi Richardson

== History ==
In 1971, four members of the University of British Columbia Varsity Outdoor Club conceived the idea of a mountain climbing equipment co-op when a snowstorm stranded them on Mount Baker in Washington state. Prior to this they had been purchasing gear at REI in Seattle. Other Varsity Outdoor Club members joined the plan and MEC was formed. The organization was incorporated under the British Columbia Co-operative Associations Act, with a constitution that was originally written by co-founder Jim Byers.

=== 1972–2000 ===
The MEC's first physical store was opened in 1972 on West Hastings Street in Vancouver. By 1981, it had opened a store in Calgary and had 57,000 members. MEC established its third retail location in Toronto, in 1985. By 1992, MEC's sales had increased to more than $35-million and had 330,000 members. Hudson's Bay Company executive Bill Gibson was hired from outside the organization and within a few years he had opened stores in Ottawa and Edmonton.

=== 2000–2015 ===
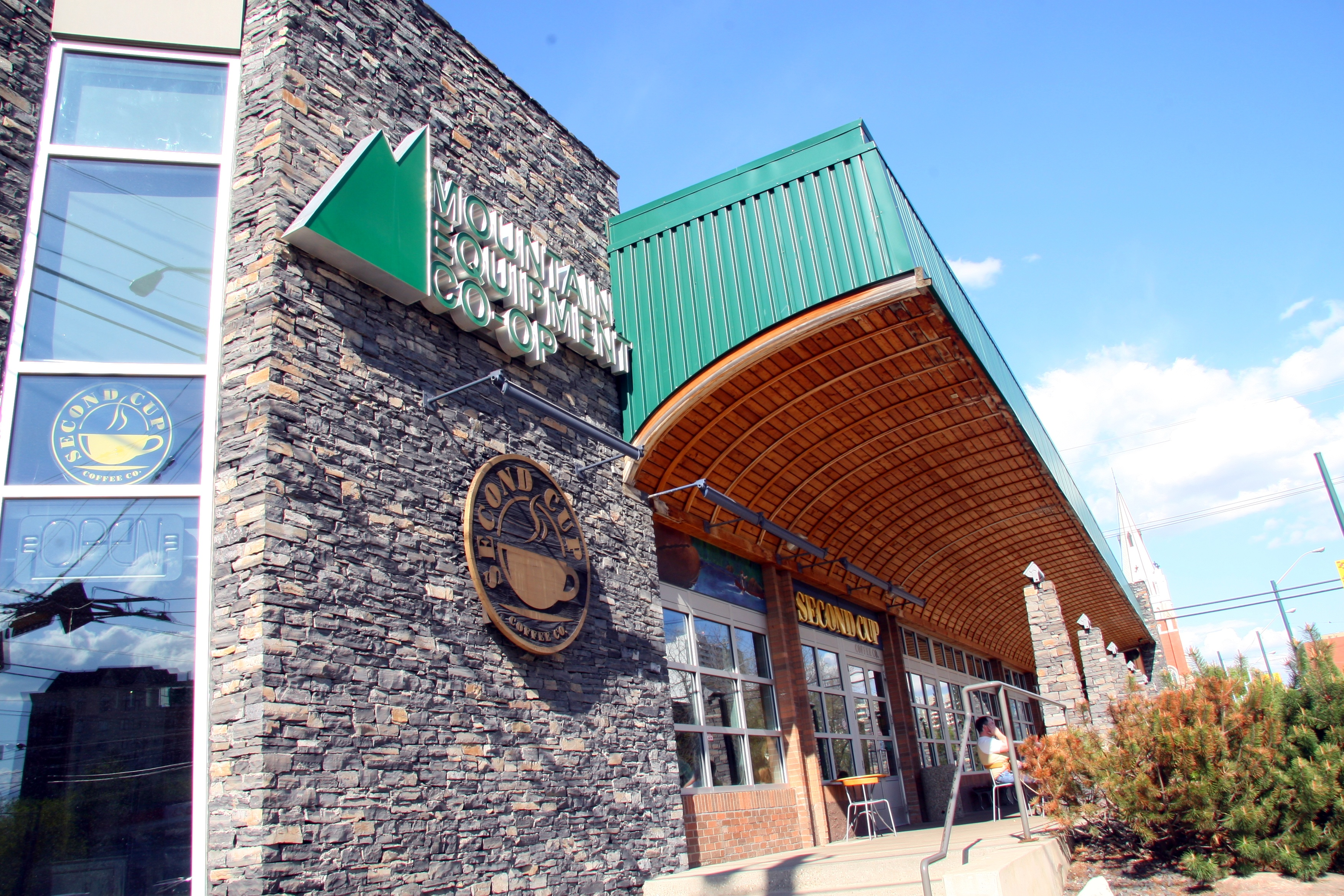
Former MEC store in Edmonton

Peter Robinson was CEO from 2000 to 2007, until he was replaced by David Labistour in 2007.

Gibson moved to the board in 2000 for a dozen years, which he chaired between 2009 and 2012.

Serratus Mountain Products Ltd. and "the following substantially inactive companies": 330204 British Columbia Ltd., 340070 British Columbia Ltd. and 1314625 Ontario Limited were as of December 29, 2002 wholly owned subsidiaries of MEC.

==== Festivals ====
In 2006 MEC began a national program of outdoor "festivals" in every city in Canada that the organization had a store. MEC Paddlefest was the first of these, followed in 2008 by MEC Bikefest, which was initially run in six cities and later expanded. MEC launched its third festival, MEC Snowfest, in all MEC store cities during the winter of 2011.

==== Expanded product lines ====
From 2009 to 2011 MEC expanded its traditional back-country products to include urban outdoor pursuits. Road running, bicycles and yoga apparel were introduced and became significant components of MEC's marketing focus.

In November 2009, MEC entered the bicycle retail market. This move was resisted by some suppliers of bicycle components, who refused to ship to MEC. One Quebec distributor ceased doing business with a bicycle manufacturer when that company decided to supply MEC. At that time, MEC had 11 retail outlets and about $265 million in sales. The CEO of MEC remarked that the industry had been given two years' notice about MEC's plans to enter the bicycle market. For its initial bicycles offered, MEC contracted with a Taiwanese manufacturer to build a bicycle line under MEC's own brand. MEC planned to sell $4 million worth of bicycles in its first year.

In November 2009 MEC began selling MEC-branded bikes in seven stores: Vancouver, Calgary, Winnipeg, Burlington, Toronto, Montreal and Longueuil. In 2015, MEC offered 58 different models including road bikes, mountain bikes, hybrid and urban bikes. Some models are designed specifically for women or children. In 2012 MEC also began selling a selection of Ghost Bikes, in late 2013 added Ridley Bikes who made the choice to bet on the success of MEC instead of existing distributor Live To Play Sports, and Intense Bicycles in early 2017.

==== Business model opposition ====
In November 2010, as the MEC petitioned North Vancouver for permission to re-zone a property for expansion of its retail operation there, Jayson Faulkner, a competitor who owned Escape Route, took issue with the income tax rules under which the MEC was able to "amass hundreds of millions of dollars in patronage dividends that were never taxed or paid out to members, thus creating a huge pool of cash to fund its dramatic expansion." Faulkner wrote that "MEC is able to generate working capital at 10x the rate of all its competitors... MEC is absolutely no different than any other very large corporation operating in Canada. They are an aggressive, predatory competitor who will do whatever it takes to ensure they continue to grow and eat up market share, which is already 70-80% in some product categories... They have in the past and present, undertaken decisions and policies that will aggressively protect their own interests. “Lead pipe” capitalism is alive and well at MEC." The petition succeeded.

==== Rebranding ====
In 2012, when MEC had 15 stores, its marketing name was changed from Mountain Equipment Co-op to just MEC, to reflect the changed focus of the organization.

On 18 June 2013, Mountain Equipment rebranded their logo, replacing the twin mountain peaks with a green square containing the text "MEC" in bold.

In 2013 the "earnings before patronage return and income taxes" was $10 million, and in 2014 was $8 million, on sales that year of $336 million; cost of sales was $226 million and cost of administration was $105 million.

==== Board governance changes ====
Over the four-year period to 2011–2015, the board of directors made it increasingly difficult for members lacking specific educational and experience qualifications to run for board membership. Former board chairman Anders Ourom, who had been a member of the MEC board for nine years, was even disqualified for election in 2012, as unqualified. Former board chairman Chris McNeil, who had served on the board for 20 years, said, "if there are too many people with sophisticated backgrounds, they will have a mindset or bias there because of the type of person you're asking for." MEC co-founder Jim Byers, observed, "they've become captured by the very retail structures that we fought against." Governance consultant Mark Latham said, "I don't think members' interests are well protected by the governance as it is now." By this time the board was able to disqualify board candidates and disregard member resolutions it disliked.

In 2013, "the board required that director candidates have board or senior management experience 'in a complex organization'. For the 2016 election, the board requires directors to have that experience 'in an organization of comparable complexity to MEC'." MEC CEO David Labistour said that pre-selection of board candidates "offers [the] membership an informed election" that is both transparent and "in line with the health of the organization." Concurrently, the board was given a hefty pay raise. In 2015, the chair made more than $58,000, as compared to 2011 when he was compensated $30,500.

Democratic remedies available to MEC members were curtailed during the same period. In 2013, "the board increased the number of signatures required to get a motion placed before the membership to 500 from five" It was noted that "now, even if a special resolution has the required number of signatures, the board can still refuse to put it on the ballot if two-thirds of directors are opposed."

In 2015, MEC had 18 stores and had sales of $336 million. Its product lineup was broadened to include "more mainstream items such as road running shoes and downhill skis", and it aimed to better serve a "younger, more multicultural and female" clientele. CEO Labistour observed that the values of the "white Anglo-Saxon male" were being obliterated and, to cope with the changed circumstances of the Canadian retail environment, he changed the mission of the organization. As of 2014 year end, subsidiary 1314625 Ontario Limited was "substantially inactive" according to the audit firm of KPMG.

=== 2015–2019 ===
A change in mission occurred while Bill Gibson was MEC's board chair, as the co-op incorporated urban pursuits like road running, cycling and yoga into the product line. By 2015, products also included downhill skis, snowboards and accessories. MEC had formerly focused on "self-propelled outdoor wilderness activities" and these new product lines made it a competitor in the urban sports retail market under CEO Labistour. MEC had positioned itself as a competitor to the Forzani Group and Walmart Canada, and this attracted complaints from retailers like Sporting Life, whose co-founder David Russell noted that as a co-op, MEC had considerable tax advantages.

In 2017, it was reported that 36% of the products sold by the MEC were its own brand. The organization had 22 retail stores and 2,450 employees. Kelowna, Laval, South Edmonton and North York had brand-new MEC stores and the store in London, Ontario had been relocated. The North York store was the third store in the Greater Toronto Area, while Kelowna was the first store added in the Okanagan. In 2016 the fiscal year was changed from end-December to end-February. The co-op planned to open a new store in Kitchener, and relocate the stores in Edmonton and Quebec City in the spring of 2017. Planning was also underway for a relocated Toronto store for the fall of 2018, a new Calgary South store in the fall of 2018, relocation of the Vancouver store and the opening of a new store in west Calgary for the fall of 2019.

On August 10, 2017, it was reported by the Corporate Registrar of BC that as of August 2, 1314625 Ontario Limited had been listed as an extraprovincial company having business as a foreign entity in BC.

=== 2020 financial difficulties and sale of assets ===
In November 2018, South African-born CEO David Labistour announced his plans to leave MEC, after 11 years as CEO. Between 2003 and 2008, he had been employed by the firm as "Chief Product Officer". Labistour grew the company's share ownership from 2.7 million members to 5.1 million members and opened 11 new retail locations. Ellen Pekeles was then chair of the Board of Directors.

In May 2019 the former chief financial officer at Best Buy Canada, Philippe Arrata, was appointed as CEO of MEC. Arrata had been an MEC board member between 2015 and 2018, and was also an adjunct professor at the University of British Columbia's Sauder School of Business.

In December 2019, MEC announced a net loss of $11.5 million for the fiscal year that had ended February 24, 2019, which included restructuring charges of $8.5 million. This compared to net earnings of $11.7 million a year earlier.

In May 2020 Steve Grant, a former MEC staff member and former member of the board of directors, along with other long-term members, accused the MEC board of rigging its own elections since 2012, to allow it to stack the board with its own preferred members. The board had amended its own rules to allow it to recommend candidates on the ballot that it wanted elected and exclude candidates it deemed unqualified.

As of September 14, 2020, MEC owed a syndicate of lenders $74 million. It had suffered losses and laid off 900 employees, in part because of the COVID-19 pandemic. MEC expected to owe $92.4 million by the end of November. Its year-end financial statement indicates that had "lost $11.487 million in 2019 on sales of $462 million", partly due to COVID-19. At that time, the co-op had 5 million members.

==== Sale of the co-op assets ====
On September 14, 2020, it was announced that MEC's assets, including the majority of its retail stores, would be acquired by private equity firm Kingswood Capital Management, LP in a deal under the federal Companies' Creditors Arrangement Act. Kingswood Capital Management plans to retain at least 17 of the 22 existing stores as well as up to 75% of the staff and operate the stores as a chain, using the existing MEC name and branding. Following the completion of the sale, the co-operative itself will continue to formally exist for the time being, but its retail activities will cease. The incoming CEO Eric Claus stated that it was "highly unlikely" that members would receive their $5 shares back. Staff cuts and closures of at least five locations are planned. The fate of a proposed location in Saskatoon was left unclear.

The decision to sell its assets to Kingswood was met with objection from some co-op members. The board of directors had not consulted MEC members about the sale nor even informed them about it. The board had also not consulted members on a possible rights issue deal, to make an internal offer to refloat the co-op. A petition was started on Change.org "calling on the MEC Board of Directors to cancel the deal, and hold immediate open, fair and democratic board elections". It had accumulated 73,600 signatures in its first four days. By September 26, 2020 the petition had exceeded 136,000 signatures.

In an official announcement on September 18, 2020 Judi Richardson, Chair of the MEC Board of Directors, addressed members, writing, "We recognize this has been an unsettling week for members. The sale of MEC's business, and the decision to move the business away from the co-operative model was, after all, a very difficult decision – but it was the right one. Facing a stark choice, we chose to preserve employment opportunities, a larger store presence, and a commitment to MEC's ethos rather than fold up the MEC tent for good." In explaining why there was no communication with members on the sale she indicated that the board had prioritized "preserving jobs and saving MEC from bankruptcy or liquidation. In short, we prioritized MEC's survival." She indicated that while under CCAA protection, "a member vote (or in the case of corporations, a shareholder vote) is not required" to sell the assets of the organization.

MEC founding board member Sara Golling said in a September 18, 2020 interview that she felt "grief and betrayal" at the sale of the co-op's assets to a private US investment firm. She stated, "MEC was a co-op, and one of the co-operative principles is democratic member control. The members were never consulted about this. We were never warned just how bad conditions were for MEC. We knew it was bad but we had rather hoped [the co-op] could survive this rough patch. We weren't given any voice at all in what happened. We were totally ignored by the board when perhaps we could have helped." When asked, "would you shop at MEC again? Golling replied, "At this point, I kind of doubt it. Why would I? I feel so disappointed. So betrayed."

On September 21, a group of shareholders announced that it had raised $50,000 through a GoFundMe campaign in order to be represented in the CCAA process by Victory Square Law Office of Vancouver, and in order "to hold an emergency members' meeting to replace the board of directors". Co-operatives and Mutuals Canada and the British Columbia Co-op Association asked government to "make sure legislation governing co-ops has been respected in the deal," and questioned the use of the CCAA in relation to the BC Co-operative Association Act.

On September 24, it was reported that Robert Wallis, the board member who chaired the special committee that sought from March 2020 a "strategic alternative" to its own management filed an affidavit in which the then-current board said that it considered "impractical to impossible" an early disclosure to shareholders of the difficulties encountered by the then-current board with their continued management of the retail business, which then included a subsidiary, 1314625 Ontario Limited. The then-current board found "negligible" the chance that shareholders might raise sufficient funds. The burn rate of the money-losing business was then approximately $1.6 million per week. The Wallis affidavit restated the losses for year 2018-2019 as $31.4 million as opposed to the $11.5 million previously published, and disclosed that $24.5 million had been lost in the 2019-2020 business year. The Wallis affidavit listed at great length the alternatives sought by the special committee, and stated that full and fair disclosure to shareholders as part of a rights issue "could have had a negative impact on MEC's business, including its relationships with suppliers and landlords and its search for new financing or for a buyer." The conduct of the special committee was influenced by the participation of a Financial Advisor (FTI Consulting) who were retained by the Royal Bank of Canada, who were lead banker in the lenders' consortium.

On September 22, the court-appointed monitor, Alvarez & Marsal Canada Inc, urged the BC Supreme Court to endorse the $110 million sale to Kingswood in a hearing that was scheduled to occur on September 28. The Globe and Mail reported that between February 23 and September 6, 2020, MEC had a net loss of $20.9 million on sales of $162.8 million. The financial advisor to the liquidation process "contacted 158 parties; nine of them ultimately signed a letter of intent contemplating an acquisition of most or all of the assets." MEC owned outright six of 22 retail locations: North York, North Vancouver, Ottawa, Burlington, Calgary and Winnipeg, which had a collective book value of $65.9 million. The Surrey distribution centre had a book value of $24.4 million.

On September 25 it was disclosed in the Save MEC Notice of Application for intervenor status that the stakeholding of the 5.7 million members amounted to $192 million, or an average of $33 per member, who represented 22% of the working-age population of Canada. On September 28, the current management responded in a court filing, which said they doubted the ability of Save MEC to address the significant "cash flow issues, noting that the proposed sources of potential funding don't involve concrete commitments or realistic options" and remarked that they feared "the proposed adjournment would put the deal (with Kingswood) in jeopardy."

== Store locations opened ==
MEC had expanded across Canada as follows:

- Vancouver (1972)
- Calgary (downtown) (1977)
- Toronto (downtown) (1985)

Gibson years

- Ottawa (1992)
- Edmonton (downtown) (1998)

Robinson years

- Halifax (2001)
- Winnipeg (2002)
- Montreal (2003)
- Quebec City (2004)
- North Vancouver (2004)
- Victoria (2006)

Labistour years

- Burlington (2008)
- Longueuil (2009)
- Barrie (2010)
- London, Ontario (2011)
- Langley (2013)
- Kelowna (2016)
- Laval (2016)
- Edmonton (South Edmonton Common) (2016)
- Toronto (North York) (2016)
- Kitchener (2017)
- Calgary (South) (2018)
