= Higg Index =

Apparel and footwear sustainability assessment standard

The Higg Index is a suite of tools to rate environmental and social sustainability throughout the supply chain. It was initially launched by the Sustainable Apparel Coalition in 2012. However, in 2024, the Sustainable Apparel Coalition rebranded as Cascale to reflect its expanded focus beyond the apparel sector and into other adjacent categories. The nonprofit consists of more than 300 fashion brands, retailers, manufacturers, academic institutions, affiliates, NGOs and governments. While initially formed to create standardized sustainability metrics, Cascale has since sharpened its focus to driving pre-competitive, collective action across three foundational pillars: "Combat Climate Change", "Decent Work for All", and a "Nature-Positive Future". This is outlined in its "Evolution for Impact" strategic plan, revised in 2023.

As of 2026, more than 45,000 facilities across 97 countries use the Higg Index tools through the Worldly platform. However, the Higg Index has been criticized by some for using poor data and a non-transparent approach resulting in potentially misleading information on which fiber is more sustainable.

== Overview ==
Worldly, a software company that develops supply chain management and sustainability reporting software operates as the platform for the Higg Index suite of tools, which Cascale develops and owns.Walmart and Patagonia founded Cascale (SAC) in 2009 with the goal of convening stakeholders across the industry on a pre-competitive basis to develop a common approach to measuring sustainability. The nonprofit's members include brands producing apparel or footwear; retailers; industry affiliates and trade associations; the U.S. Environmental Protection Agency, academic institutions and environmental nonprofits, among others.

The Higg Index provides a suite of five tools to assess sustainability throughout a product's entire life cycle, from materials to end-of-life. The metrics created Higg Index are limited to a company's internal use for the evaluation and improvement of environmental performance. As of 2012, plans for a future version included a scoring scale to communicate a product's sustainability to consumers and other stakeholders. As of 2023, the Higg Index Suite of Tools included the Higg Facility Environmental Module (FEM), Higg Facility Social & Labor Module (FSLM), Higg Brand & Retail Module (BRM), Higg Materials Sustainability Index (MSI), and Higg Product Module (PM). While Higg Index metrics support internal evaluation and improvement, they are not limited to only internal use. Assessment results can be shared with supply chain partners or publicly for greater transparency and to satisfy corporate sustainability reporting requirements, including mandatory disclosures under the EU's Corporate Sustainability Reporting Directive (CSRD) and Integrated Reporting (IR) frameworks that increasingly incorporate Higg data into Annual Reports (AR) and comprehensive sustainability communications.

== History ==
The Higg Index was adapted from two previously existing sustainability measurement standards: the Nike Apparel Environmental Design Tool and the 2007 Eco Index created by the Outdoor Industry Association, the European Outdoor Group and the Zero Waste Alliance. The Eco Index had been created by a group of outdoor companies including REI, MEC, Patagonia, Outdoor Research and others starting in 2007. Leaders of the group at this time included Kevin Myette, Greg Scott, Ammi Borenstein, Peter Girard, Nick Sterling and many others. After 2–3 years of independent work the Eco Index was adopted by the Outdoor Industry Association and ultimately became a core component of the Higg Index. The SAC was established as brands and retailers sought to self-regulate on environmental and sustainability issues. Version 1.0 of the Higg Index was made public in July 2012.

According to the Coalition's Executive Director in 2012, the name "Higg" was inspired by the Higgs Boson search. The name Higg also met other key criteria: it was short, easy to pronounce and was able to clear trademark registration in 120 countries.

In its first iteration, Higg Index metrics focus on environmental factors in the apparel supply chain. As of 2013, Metrics pertaining to footwear as well as labor and social sustainability were planned for a future release. On 11 December 2013, an updated version of the Higg Index was released.

In October 2015, the Sustainable Apparel Coalition announced the launch of the Social Labor and Convergence Project, which seeks to establish a uniform standard for auditing labor conditions and social impact in the apparel and footwear industries.

In August 2025, GreenStitch a climate tech company focused on fashion launched AI powered Higg Analyser to help Higg users to analyse gaps in their reporting and improve scores.

== Criticism ==
The Higg Index has been criticized for being based on poor data and using a non-transparent approach resulting in misleading information which fiber is more sustainable. The index is rating synthetics as the most sustainable choice. In a June 2022 statement in response to a New York Times article, former chief executive officer Amina Razvi said the assumption was “incorrect," adding the SAC's communication guidelines specifically "prohibit brands from making comparisons across material types.” Razvi told WWD the tools are "constantly in evolution," with the changes made based upon best available science, use, and feedback.

In June 2022, the Norwegian Consumer Authority notified the Sustainable Apparel Coalition, H&M and Norrøna that they concluded the consumer-facing part of the SAC's transparency program was potentially misleading to consumers. June 27, 2022 the Sustainable Apparel Coalition said that it will pause the use of consumer-facing Higg MSI labels globally.

Since the initial outreach from the NCA, and following the publication of a guidance document, the SAC stated it was "grateful for the collaboration and productive discussions" and that it was working through the non legally binding guidance. A representative from the NCA also took part in the SAC's 2022 Annual Meeting in Singapore, as panelists discussed the challenges and opportunities of eco-labelling. The theme of the event was Collective Action on Common Ground.

The organization has taken a proactive stance since the NCA's notice, as noted in its annual report. As another initiative, the organization launched its 2030 Decarbonization Program in 2022.

In March 2023, the SAC updated the Higg BRM which assesses sustainability performance across 11 key impact areas within three pillars: environmental, social, and governance better aligning with upcoming regulation. In November 2023, the SAC launched the updated Higg FEM 4.0 based on more than two years of collected feedback from members and a pilot with 400 users. SAC said the updates resulted in improved data precision, alignment with key industry standards, expanded environmental impacts, user-centric design, and audit efficiency.
