= Atoms (shoes) =

American footwear brand

- Company type: Private
- Industry: Footwear
- Founded: 2019
- Founders: Waqas Ali; Sidra Qasim
- Headquarters: Brooklyn Navy Yard, New York
- Website: atoms.com

Atoms is a privately held footwear brand, based in Brooklyn, New York, that designs, develops and sells footwear. Atoms offers quarter size shoes and allows customers to buy pairs of shoes in two different sizes.

== History ==
Atoms was founded by husband and wife Waqas Ali and Sidra Qasim in San Francisco. In 2012, they started their first footwear company as students at Forman Christian College University, Lahore named 'Markhor' (originally Hometown) in Pakistan, while working with craftsmen in their hometown of Basirpur in Okara, Pakistan. In 2015, the couple moved to Mountain View as part of Y Combinator's accelerator program. They were inspired by the challenges that most people still wear shoes that do not fit properly. The founders wanted to design a shoe that people would use every day. Atoms started selling via invite-only access on its website and built a waitlist of over 40,000 people before publicly launching on June 3, 2019.
